= Exploitation film =

Informal film genre

An exploitation film is a film that seeks commercial success by capitalizing on current trends, niche genres, or lurid content. Exploitation films often feature themes such as suggestive or explicit sex, sensational violence, drug use, nudity, gore, destruction, rebellion, mayhem, and the bizarre. While often associated with low-budget "B movies", some exploitation films have influenced popular culture, attracted critical attention, gained historical significance, and developed cult followings.

== History ==
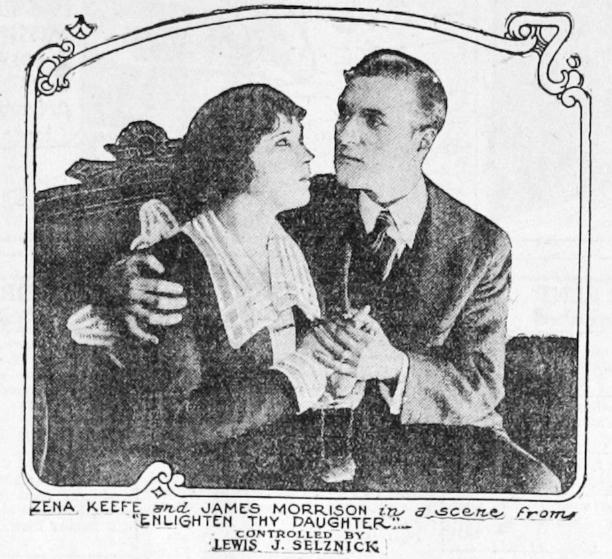
A publicity still for the silent film Enlighten Thy Daughter (1917), which claimed to alert about the perils of premarital sex. Such "sex hygiene" films are considered an early form of exploitation film.

Early forms of exploitation films first appeared in the 1920s, but their peak periods were mainly from the 1960s to the 1980s, with a few earlier and later outliers. Early exploitation films of the 1930s and 1940s were often disguised as "educational" but were really sensationalist. These were shown in traveling roadshows, skirting censorship under the guise of moral instruction. One of the film industry's early and most successful producers of exploitation films was Kroger Babb. Babb produced the 1945 film Mom and Dad, a sex hygiene film telling the story of a young girl's accidental pregnancy. According to a 1977 Washington Post article, Time claimed in 1949 that one in ten people had seen the film, and Babb used promotional tactics to "overwhelm a town with exploitation material, even pioneering the use of direct mail advertising, sending four-color heralds to every mailbox in town." The film was the third-highest grossing film of the 1940s in dollar value. The 1950s saw low-budget sci-fi, monster movies, and teen rebellion films. They were still tame by later standards, but laid the groundwork. The 1960s, with the collapse of the Production Code and the rise of grindhouses, became fertile ground for exploitation films, which introduced sex, gore, and shock value. The 1970s are widely considered the golden age of exploitation films, with independent producers thriving in grindhouse cinemas and drive-ins. In the early 1980s, the home video explosion gave exploitation filmmakers a new playground, with VHS allowing for direct-to-video content. The MPAA crackdown and increasing mainstream competition began to dull the edge mid-decade. Starting with the late 1980s, exploitation films started to fade or become self-aware.

The Motion Picture Association (MPA), founded in 1922 as the Motion Picture Producers and Distributors of America (MPPDA) and known as the Motion Picture Association of America (MPAA) from 1945 until September 2019, was established to protect the interests and image of the American film industry. In 1930, it introduced the Motion Picture Production Code – commonly known as the Hays Code – which imposed strict guidelines on film content. This code remained in effect until 1968, when it was replaced by a voluntary film rating system, administered by the Classification and Rating Administration (CARA). While the MPA collaborated with censorship boards and grassroots organizations to promote a "clean" image of Hollywood, exploitation filmmakers often operated outside this system. They embraced controversy, using it as free publicity, and relied on sensational content to attract audiences lost to television.

The definition of "exploitation" is flexible and often shaped by the viewer's perception as much as the film's actual content. Titillating and artistic elements frequently coexist; Many art films rejected by the Hays Code were screened in the same grindhouses as exploitation films. Exploitation films share a willingness to explore "disreputable" material, much like the transgressive works of European auteurs. Numerous films now regarded as classics contain levels of sex, violence, and shock once relegated to the realm of exploitation. Both art house and exploitation audiences are often united by their rejection of mainstream Hollywood conventions.

Since the 1990s, exploitation cinema has garnered increasing academic interest and is sometimes referred to as paracinema.

== Grindhouses and drive-ins ==
"Grindhouse", or "action house", is an American term for a theater that primarily showcased low-budget exploitation films aimed at adult audiences. These theaters gained peak popularity in the 1970s and early 1980s, particularly in New York City and other urban centers across North America. Historian David Church notes that the term "grindhouse" originates from the "grind policy" – a film programming strategy from the 1920s involving continuous showings at discounted prices that increased throughout the day. This approach contrasted sharply with the era's more traditional exhibition model, which featured fewer daily screenings and tiered ticket pricing based on seating, typically in large, studio-owned theaters. Grindhouses began to decline in the mid-1980s with the rise of home video.

A drive-in theater is an outdoor movie venue featuring a large screen, a projection booth, a concession stand, and a parking area where patrons can watch films from the comfort of their cars. These theaters evolved over time in both structure and technology. Initially, audio was delivered through speakers on the screen or individual wired speakers hooked to car windows, but this system was eventually replaced by microbroadcasting the film's soundtrack to car radios, offering better sound quality and eliminating the risk of damaging windows or cords. As drive-ins began to decline in popularity during the 1960s and 1970s, theater owners sought to attract audiences by screening low-cost exploitation films, dubbed "drive-in" films. Some producers even made films specifically for this market, and the constant demand for new content led to the theory that they would "grind out" films – an idea that may have influenced the term "grindhouse".

== Major subgenres ==
Exploitation films may adopt the subject matter and styling of regular film genres, particularly action, horror and thriller films, and their themes are sometimes influenced by other so-called exploitative media, such as pulp magazines. They often blur the distinctions between genres by containing elements of two or more genres at a time. Their subgenres are identifiable by the characteristics they use.

=== Automobile/auto racing films ===
Automobile films are films whose plots focus on, or prominently feature, cars and other automobiles. Some of these films focus specifically on auto racing. Such films were popular from the mid-1960s through the 1980s. They can be regarded as a subgenre of action film.

Notable films in this subgenre include The Great Race (1965), Grand Prix (1966), Duel (1971), Le Mans (1971), Vanishing Point (1971), Gone in 60 Seconds (1974), Death Race 2000 (1975), Smokey and the Bandit (1977), Mad Max (1979), The Cannonball Run (1981) and Pink Cadillac (1989). Some automobile-focused films combine the action and horror genres. Notable examples include The Car (1977), Maximum Overdrive (1986) and The Wraith (1986).

=== Blaxploitation films ===
In American cinema, Blaxploitation is the film subgenre of action movie derived from the exploitation film genre in the early 1970s, consequent to the combined cultural momentum of the Black civil rights movement, the black power movement, and the Black Panther Party, political and sociological circumstances that facilitated Black artists reclaiming their power over the Representation of the Black ethnic identity in the arts. The term blaxploitation is a portmanteau of the words Black and exploitation, coined by Junius Griffin, president of the Beverly Hills–Hollywood branch of the NAACP in 1972. In criticizing the Hollywood portrayal of the multiracial society of the US, Griffin said that the blaxploitation genre was "proliferating offenses" to and against the Black community, by perpetuating racist stereotypes of inherent criminality.

After the perceived cultural misrepresentation of Black people in the race films of the 1940s, the 1950s, and the 1960s, the Blaxploitation movie genre presented Black characters and Black communities as the protagonists and the places of the story, rather than as background or secondary characters in the story, such as the Magical negro or as the victims of criminals. To counter the racist misrepresentations of Blackness in the American movie business, UCLA financially assisted Black students to attend film school. The cultural emergence of the Blaxploitation subgenre was facilitated by the Hollywood movie studios adopting a permissive system of film ratings in 1968.

Initially, blaxploitation films were black cinema produced for the entertainment of Black people in the cities of the US, but the entertainment appeal of the Black characters and human stories extended into the mainstream cinema of corporate Hollywood. Recognizing the profitability of the financially inexpensive blaxploitation films, the corporate movie studios then produced blaxploitation movies specifically for the cultural sensibilities of mainstream viewers. Blaxploitation films were the first to feature soundtracks of funk and soul music.

The first and perhaps most iconic examples of blaxploitation were made in the 1970s. A prime example of the genre is Shaft (1971), directed by Gordon Parks and starring Richard Roundtree in the title role. Collaboration between director Jack Hill and actress Pam Grier gave birth to two of the most famous female-led blaxploitation films; Coffy (1973) and Foxy Brown (1974). The Wiz (1978) reimagines the classic children's novel The Wonderful Wizard of Oz by L. Frank Baum with an African American cast, starring singers Diana Ross and Michael Jackson in the lead roles. 1980s blaxploitation films include Action Jackson (1988) and the blaxploitation parody film I'm Gonna Git You Sucka (1988).

=== Cannibal films ===
Cannibal films, alternatively known as the cannibal boom films, are a subgenre of horror films made predominantly by Italian filmmakers during the 1970s and 1980s. This subgenre is a collection of graphically violent movies that usually depict cannibalism by primitive, Stone Age natives deep within the Asian or South American rainforests. While cannibalism is the uniting feature of these films, the general emphasis focuses on various forms of shocking, realistic and graphic violence, typically including torture, rape and genuine cruelty to animals. This subject matter was often used as the main advertising draw of cannibal films in combination with exaggerated or sensational claims regarding the films' reputations.

Ruggero Deodato's Cannibal Holocaust (1980) is often considered to be the best-known film of the genre due to the significant controversy surrounding its release, and is one of the few films of the genre to garner mainstream attention. Another famous film of the genre is Umberto Lenzi's Cannibal Ferox (1981).

=== Canuxploitation films ===
"Canuxploitation" is a neologism that was coined in 1999 by the magazine Broken Pencil, in the article "Canuxploitation! Goin' Down the Road with the Cannibal Girls that Ate Black Christmas. Your Complete Guide to the Canadian B-Movie", to refer to Canadian-made B-movies. Most mainstream critical analysis of this period in Canadian film history, however, refers to it as the "tax-shelter era".

The phenomenon emerged in 1974, when the government of Canada introduced new regulations to jumpstart the then-underdeveloped Canadian film industry, increasing the Capital Cost Allowance tax credit from 60 per cent to 100 per cent. While some important and noteworthy films were made under the program, and some film directors who cut their teeth in the "tax shelter" era emerged as among Canada's most important and influential filmmakers, the new regulations also had an entirely unforeseen side effect: a sudden rush of low-budget horror and genre films, intended as pure tax shelters since they were designed not to turn a conventional profit. Many of the films, in fact, were made by American filmmakers, whose projects had been rejected by the Hollywood studio system as not commercially viable, giving rise to the Hollywood North phenomenon. Variety dubbed the genre "maple syrup porno".

The period officially ended in 1982, when the Capital Cost Allowance was reduced to 50 per cent, although films that had entered production under the program continued to be released for another few years afterward. However, at least one Canadian film blog extends the "Canuxploitation" term to refer to any Canadian horror, thriller or science fiction film made up to the present day.

David Cronenberg stands out as the most important director of this era, with the horror/science fiction films Shivers (1975), Rabid (1977), The Brood (1979), Scanners (1981) and Videodrome (1983). Certain important Canuxploitation films were slashers, like Black Christmas (1974), Prom Night (1980), Terror Train (1980), Happy Birthday to Me (1981) and My Bloody Valentine (1981). Other Canuxploitation films include the teen comedies Meatballs (1979) and Porky's (1981), the supernatural horror film The Changeling (1980), and the action/thriller Class of 1984 (1982).

=== Chanbara films ===
Chanbara, meaning "sword fighting" films, denotes the Japanese film genre called samurai cinema in English and is roughly equivalent to Western and swashbuckler films. Chanbara is a sub-category of jidaigeki, which equates to period drama. While earlier samurai period pieces were more dramatic rather than action-based, samurai films produced after World War II have become more action-based, with darker and more violent characters. Historically, the genre is usually set during the Tokugawa era (1600–1868).

In the 1950s and the 1960s, famous Japanese directors like Akira Kurosawa, Kenji Mizoguchi, Hiroshi Inagaki, Masaki Kobayashi, Kaneto Shindo and Kihachi Okamoto made samurai-themed films. However, none of these films fall under the category of exploitation cinema. While some may contain violence, samurai action, or supernatural elements, they are all recognized as artistically significant works by acclaimed directors.

In the 1970s, a revisionist, non-traditional style of samurai film achieved some popularity in Japan. It became known as chanbara, an onomatopoeia describing the clash of swords. Chanbara features few of the stoic, formal sensibilities of earlier jidaigeki films – the new chanbara featured revenge-driven antihero protagonists, nudity, sex scenes, swordplay and blood. This new subgenre is mostly associated with 1970s samurai manga by Kazuo Koike.

The most famous films based on Koike's work are as follows: Lone Wolf and Cub: Sword of Vengeance (1972), directed by Kenji Misumi and starring Tomisaburo Wakayama, tells the story of Ogami Ittō, a wandering assassin for hire who is accompanied by his young son, Daigoro. It is the first in a series of six films in the Lone Wolf and Cub series. Shogun Assassin (1980), directed by Robert Houston, was edited and compiled from the first two films in the series. Lady Snowblood (1973), directed by Toshiya Fujita and starring Meiko Kaji, recounts the tale of Yuki, a woman who seeks vengeance upon three of the people who raped her mother and killed her half brother.

=== Eurospy films ===
Eurospy film (or Spaghetti spy film, when referring to Italian-produced films in the genre), is a genre of spy films produced in Europe, especially in Italy, France, and Spain, that either sincerely imitated or else parodied the British James Bond spy series feature films. The genre was an offshoot of the wider 1960s spy craze that had begun with James Bond in 1962 and had taken root across the Western world, lasting into the early-to-mid '70s in countries such as the UK. Britain participated in the Eurospy movement it had inspired, albeit spreading its output across lower-budget Eurospy-style copycat media and more serious productions with higher budgets than were typical of the genre.

Eurospy films are better categorized as "spy action" films because they emphasize stylized action, gadgets, and exotic locales over the psychological tension and realism typical of "spy thrillers" which are not action-oriented.

=== Giallo films ===
In Italian cinema, giallo is a genre of murder mystery fiction that often contains slasher, thriller, psychological horror, psychological thriller, sexploitation, and, less frequently, supernatural horror elements.

This particular style of Italian-produced murder mystery horror-thriller film usually blends the atmosphere and suspense of thriller fiction with elements of horror fiction and eroticism, and often involves a mysterious killer whose identity is not revealed until the final act of the film. The genre developed in the mid-to-late 1960s, peaked in popularity during the 1970s, and subsequently declined in commercial mainstream filmmaking over the next few decades, though examples continue to be produced. It was a predecessor to, and had significant influence on, the later slasher film genre.

The first notable examples of giallo were made by Mario Bava, which include Blood and Black Lace (1964) and A Bay of Blood (1971). However, the most famous examples were made by Dario Argento in the 1970s and 1980s, which include The Bird with the Crystal Plumage (1970), The Cat o' Nine Tails (1971), Four Flies on Grey Velvet (1971), Deep Red (1975), Tenebrae (1982), Phenomena (1985) and Opera (1987). Lucio Fulci is another famous director of giallo films, which include A Lizard in a Woman's Skin (1971), Don't Torture a Duckling (1972) and The New York Ripper (1982).

=== Hippie exploitation films ===
Hippie film is a subgenre of films with hippie characters, films which portray the hippie subculture, and films which promote the non-materialistic hippie counterculture values of peace, love, natural living, communal lifestyles, freedom, spiritual exploration, creativity, travel and pilgrimage, the quest for truth, changing the world for the better, consciousness, and a meaningful life.

Hippie films were an American phenomenon, and they were popular from the late 1960s to the late 1970s, with important examples including Easy Rider (1969), Woodstock (1970), Zabriskie Point (1970), Let's Scare Jessica to Death (1971), Fritz the Cat (1972), Jesus Christ Superstar (1973) and Hair (1979).

=== Hong Kong action films ===
==== 1970s: Kung fu films ====
The umbrella terms for Chinese martial arts are kung fu, kuoshu, and wushu. As a term, kung fu refers to any learning process that requires patience, effort, time, hard work, and practice. The largest and most famous style of kung fu is Shaolin kung fu, which combines Buddhist philosophy with martial arts. It developed at the Shaolin Temple over the course of its 1,500-year history. Kung fu film is a subgenre of the broader martial arts film genre. It reached its peak in Hong Kong during the 1970s. Through dubbing, these films also became popular in the United States and Europe, and many Hong Kong actors eventually rose to international stardom. Notable kung fu film actors include Bruce Lee, Gordon Liu and Jackie Chan.

Bruce Lee was an American and Hong Kong martial artist and actor. He was the first global Chinese film star. He studied Wing Chun under Ip Man and later founded Jeet Kune Do, a hybrid martial art of his own. In the 1970s, he played a pivotal role in popularizing martial arts films around the world. Lee is known for his roles in five feature-length films; The Big Boss (1971), Fist of Fury (1972), The Way of the Dragon (1972), Enter the Dragon (1973) and Game of Death (1978). The first three of these movies are Hong Kong productions, while the last two are Hong Kong/USA co-productions, with the last film being released five years after Lee's death in 1973 of cerebral edema at the age of 32. Lee's early death led to the emergence of the subgenre of Bruceploitation, when filmmakers from Hong Kong, Taiwan and South Korea cast Bruce Lee look-alike actors to star in imitation martial arts films, in order to exploit Lee's sudden international popularity.

After the death of Bruce Lee, the end of the 1970s also saw other important kung fu films, with Jackie Chan emerging as the next big martial arts talent. Snake in the Eagle's Shadow (1978) established Chan's slapstick kung fu comedy style, while also establishing the basic plot structure used in many martial arts films internationally since then. In the same year, Chan also starred in Drunken Master (1978), featuring much of the same crew as and bearing similarities in its story and style to the earlier film. Another important martial arts film from the same year is The 36th Chamber of Shaolin (1978), starring Gordon Liu.

==== 1980s: Martial arts action/comedy films ====
In the 1980s, Jackie Chan dominated the martial arts film scene, with films that moved away from traditional kung fu stories to contemporary, urban action/comedy stories with martial arts elements. Some of his films starred the "Three Dragons", which refers to the trio of Sammo Hung, Jackie Chan and Yuen Biao, all of whom trained at the China Drama Academy. These films include Project A (1983), Wheels on Meals (1984) and Dragons Forever (1988). Apart from these, Jackie Chan also starred as the solo protagonist in several notable films, which he also directed, including Police Story (1985) and Armour of God (1986).

==== 1980s: Gun fu/heroic bloodshed films ====
Gun fu is a term formed by combining the words "gun" and "kung fu", and it refers to a subgenre that blends firearms, melee weapons, and hand-to-hand combat. It can also be understood as a fusion of the kung fu film and the gangster film. Similarly, heroic bloodshed is a subgenre characterized by highly stylized, violent, and often bloody action sequences, while exploring themes such as masculinity, family, brotherhood, friendship, duty, honor, loyalty, betrayal, and redemption. The protagonist is typically a criminal with a strong moral code (rather than a purely villainous figure), such as a Triad member, hitman, assassin, or thief. They are often betrayed by their employers and may choose to protect a potential victim instead of carrying out an assignment. Another key character is an incorruptible, conscientious police officer. These films are often emotionally driven and frequently end on a tragic note. Key figures of the gun fu and heroic bloodshed subgenres are the director John Woo and the actor Chow Yun-fat, who collaborated on films like A Better Tomorrow (1986) and The Killer (1989).

==== 1980s: Wuxia films ====
Wuxia, literally meaning "martial arts and chivalry," refers to a genre of fantasy action films centered on martial artists in ancient China. The protagonist is typically a young, wandering man from a humble background who undergoes a difficult journey of growth and becomes a formidable warrior, sometimes even acquiring supernatural abilities. Guided by a code of chivalry, he is expected to fight for justice, righteousness, and the protection of the innocent. A notable wuxia film is A Chinese Ghost Story (1987), which was adapted from Pu Songling's short story collection Strange Tales from a Chinese Studio and which played a pivotal role in popularizing folklore-based ghost films in Hong Kong cinema.

=== Mockbusters ===
A mockbuster is a film created to exploit the publicity of another major motion picture with a similar title or subject. Mockbusters are often made with a low budget and quick production to maximize profits. "Mockbuster" is a portmanteau of the words "mock" and "blockbuster".

Unlike films produced to capitalize on the popularity of a recent release by adopting similar genre or storytelling elements, mockbusters are generally produced concurrently with upcoming films and released direct-to-video around the time the film they are inspired by is released. A mockbuster may be similar enough in title or packaging that consumers confuse it with the actual film it mimics; however, their producers maintain that they are simply offering additional products for consumers who want to watch more films in the same subgenres.

Mockbusters and ripoffs can be filmed and released outside of the original films' countries. Low-budget studios in foreign countries may produce illegitimate sequels to preexisting higher budgeted films series that began in other countries. Probably, the most famous example of this is the Italian film Zombi 2 (1979), which was an unofficial sequel to the American film Dawn of the Dead, released as Zombi in Italy (1978).

=== Monster movies & natural horror films ===
A monster movie is a film that focuses on one or more characters struggling to survive attacks by one or more antagonistic monsters. The monster is often created by a folly of mankind – an experiment gone wrong, the effects of radiation or the destruction of habitat. The monster is usually a villain but can be a metaphor of humankind's continuous destruction; for instance, a symbol of atomic warfare.

The first movies of this genre were generally giant monster movies. The American film King Kong (1933), the seminal example of the genre, features a giant gorilla. The decade most closely associated with the genre is the 1950s, when it was combined with nuclear paranoia. Them! (1954) features gigantic irradiated ants, and Tarantula! (1955) features a gigantic tarantula. Creature from the Black Lagoon (1954) is an exception, as instead of a giant monster, it features an aquatic humanoid. Again in the 1950s, Japanese film studio Toho started to produce kaiju films. Godzilla (1954), the first important example of this trend, features a gigantic dinosaur-like creature. Godzilla, King of the Monsters! (1956), a Japanese-American co-production, is a heavily re-edited American localization, or "Americanization", of the 1954 Japanese film. This film was responsible for introducing Godzilla to a worldwide audience.

After the 1950s, there was a shift from giant monster movies to movies featuring more or less normal-sized animals, which would perhaps be more accurately classified as natural horror films rather than monster movies. Important examples of this new trend from the 1960s to the 1980s include The Birds (1963; birds), Phase IV (1974; ants), Jaws (1975; shark), Orca (1977; orca), Piranha (1978; piranhas), Alligator (1980; alligator), White Dog (1982; dog), Cujo (1983; dog) and Monkey Shines (1988; monkey). However, King Kong (1976), a remake of the 1933 film, is a giant monster film just like the original.

Jaws (1975) also created its own subgenre of exploitation film, named sharksploitation. John Nubbin of Different Worlds characterised Gremlins (1984) as an exploitation film, contending that it traded on Steven Spielberg's name and reputation as a means of generating box-office success.

=== Nazi exploitation films ===
Nazi exploitation (also Nazisploitation) is a subgenre of exploitation film and sexploitation film that involves Nazis committing sex crimes, often as camp or prison overseers during World War II. Most follow the Women-in-prison film formula, only relocated to a concentration camp, extermination camp, or Nazi brothel, and with an added emphasis on sadism, gore, and degradation. European filmmakers, mostly in Italy, produced Nazi exploitation films. Globally exported to both cinema and VHS, the Nazi exploitation films were critically attacked and heavily censored, and the subgenre all but vanished by the end of the Seventies.

In Italy, these films are known as part of the "il sadiconazista" cycle, which were inspired by such art-house films as The Night Porter (1974) by Liliana Cavani and Salò, or the 120 Days of Sodom (1975) by Pier Paolo Pasolini.

=== Nunsploitation films ===
Nunsploitation is a subgenre of exploitation film which had its peak in Europe in the 1970s. These films typically involve Christian nuns living in convents during the Middle Ages. The main conflict of the story is usually of a religious or sexual nature, such as religious oppression or sexual suppression due to living in celibacy. The Inquisition is another common theme. These films, although often seen as pure exploitation films, often contain criticism against religion in general and the Catholic Church in particular. Indeed, some protagonist dialogue voiced feminist consciousness and rejection of their subordinated social role. Many of these films were made in countries where the Catholic Church is influential, such as Italy and Spain.

The most famous example of this subgenre is The Devils (1971). A dramatised historical account of the fall of Urbain Grandier, a 17th-century Roman Catholic priest accused of witchcraft after the possessions in Loudun, France, the plot also focuses on Sister Jeanne des Anges, a sexually repressed nun who incites the accusations.

=== Outlaw biker films ===
The outlaw biker film is a film genre that portrays its characters as motorcycle riding rebels. The characters are usually members of an outlaw motorcycle club. The genre really took off in the mid-1960s, after the Hells Angels motorcycle club became prominent in the media, in particular, after Hunter S. Thompson's book Hell's Angels (1967) was published.

The outlaw biker culture was first popularized in the Marlon Brando film The Wild One (1953), which tells a story based very loosely on actual events, the 1947 Hollister riot. Later, Peter Fonda, Dennis Hopper and Jack Nicholson teamed up on the classic "hippie biker" movie, Easy Rider (1969), the antithesis of the violent biker-gang genre. The biker gang ethos also featured strongly in the famed low budget Australian production Mad Max (1979), with the film spawning the real-life subculture of survival bikes. 1980s outlaw biker films include Streets of Fire (1984) and Akira (1988).

=== Ozploitation films ===
Ozploitation films are exploitation films – a category of low-budget horror, comedy, sexploitation and action films – made in Australia after the introduction of the R rating in 1971. The year also marked the beginnings of the Australian New Wave movement, and the Ozploitation style peaked within the same time frame (early 1970s to late 1980s). Ozploitation is often considered a smaller wave within the New Wave, covering a wide range of genres from sexploitation, biker films, horror and even martial arts.

The origin of the term "Ozploitation" is credited to the documentary Not Quite Hollywood: The Wild, Untold Story of Ozploitation!. This 2008 feature explores Ozploitation films made during the Australian New Wave. The film includes interviews with numerous figures involved in Ozploitation, as well as fans of the genre, including American director Quentin Tarantino, who coined the phrase "Aussiesploitation", which director Mark Hartley then shortened to "Ozploitation".

The most important Ozploitation films include the thrillers Wake in Fright (1971), Mad Max (1979) and Roadgames (1981).

=== Rape and revenge films ===
Rape and revenge is a subgenre characterized by a person or people exacting revenge for rape committed against them or others. Rape and revenge films are also commonly horror films, thriller films or vigilante films. Notable for their graphic depiction of violence, rape, torture and sexual imagery, rape and revenge films have attracted critical attention and controversy.

The subgenre has drawn praise from feminists such as Carol J. Clover, whose book Men, Women, and Chain Saws (1992) examines the implications of its reversals of cinema's traditional gender roles. Clover, who restricts her definition of the genre to movies in which a woman is raped and gains her own revenge, praises rape and revenge exploitation films for the way in which their protagonists fight their abuse directly, rather than preserve the status quo by depending on an unresponsive legal system, as in rape–themed movies from major studios such as The Accused (1988). Author Jacinda Read and others believe that rape and revenge should be categorized as a narrative structure rather than a true subgenre, because its plot can be found in films of many different genres, such as thrillers, dramas, westerns and art films.

Perhaps the original rape and revenge film is the Swedish film The Virgin Spring (1960), which is about a father's merciless response to the rape and murder of his young daughter. Kuroneko (1968) depicts the vengeful spirits, or onryō, of a woman and her daughter-in-law, who are raped and murdered by a band of samurai. The Last House on the Left (1972) was based on The Virgin Spring, and it tells the story of parents who seek vengeance against a group a violent fugitives who abducted, raped and brutally murdered their daughter. Lady Snowblood (1973) recounts the tale of a woman who seeks vengeance upon three people who raped her mother and killed her half brother. Thriller – A Cruel Picture (1973) tells the story of a mute young woman who is forced into heroin addiction and prostitution, and her subsequent revenge on the people responsible. I Spit on Your Grave (1978) tells the story of a fiction writer based in New York City who exacts revenge on her four tormentors who gang rape and leave her for dead. It is noted for its controversial depiction of extreme graphic violence, particularly the lengthy depictions of gang rape, that take up 30 minutes of its runtime. Ms .45 (1981) tells the story of a mute woman who becomes a spree killer after she is raped twice in one day when going home from work. Red Sonja (1985) tells the story of a woman who, after being raped, receives a divine gift and seeks revenge on her assailants.

=== Sexploitation films ===
A sexploitation film serves largely as a vehicle for the exhibition of non-explicit sexual situations and gratuitous nudity. The term soft-core is often used to designate non-explicit sexploitation films to differentiate them from hardcore content.

An early sexploitation film is the American film Glen or Glenda (1953), written and directed by and starring Ed Wood, which deals with cross-dressing and transvestism. This was followed by the Russ Meyer sexploitation films like Faster, Pussycat! Kill! Kill! (1965) and Beyond the Valley of the Dolls (1970).

=== Slasher films ===
A slasher film is a subgenre of horror films involving a killer or a group of killers stalking and murdering a group of people, usually by use of bladed or sharp tools. Critics cite the psychological horror films Peeping Tom (1960) and Psycho (1960) and the Italian giallo films as early influences.

The slasher subgenre saw its peak in the 1970s and the 1980s. The Canadian film Black Christmas (1974) is one of the earliest slasher films. The two most popular 1970s slashers are the American films The Texas Chain Saw Massacre (1974) and Halloween (1978), featuring the iconic killers Leatherface and Michael Myers respectively. Less popular 1970s slashers include the American films Alice, Sweet Alice (1976), The Town That Dreaded Sundown (1976) and Tourist Trap (1979).

The 1980s had a much higher number of slashers, mostly American productions. The three most popular 1980s slashers are the American films Friday the 13th (1980), A Nightmare on Elm Street (1984) and Child's Play (1988), featuring the iconic killers Jason Voorhees, Freddy Krueger and Chucky respectively. Less popular 1980s American slashers include Maniac (1980), The Burning (1981), The Funhouse (1981), The Prowler (1981), The House on Sorority Row (1982), The Slumber Party Massacre (1982), Sleepaway Camp (1983), Silent Night, Deadly Night (1984), April Fool's Day (1986), Maniac Cop (1988), Intruder (1989) and Shocker (1989). The 1980s also saw Canadian slashers like Prom Night (1980), Terror Train (1980), Happy Birthday to Me (1981) and My Bloody Valentine (1981). Although slashers are a mainly North American phenomenon, the 1980s also saw European slashers like the Spanish Pieces (1982), the Italian Stage Fright (1987) and the Dutch Amsterdamned (1988).

=== Spaghetti Western films ===
The spaghetti Western is a broad subgenre of Western films produced in Europe. It emerged in the mid-1960s in the wake of Sergio Leone's filmmaking style and international box-office success. The term was used by foreign critics because most of these Westerns were produced and directed by Italians.

The majority of the films in the spaghetti Western genre were international co-productions by Italy and Spain, and sometimes France, West Germany, Britain, Portugal, Greece, Yugoslavia, and the United States. Over six hundred European Westerns were made between 1960 and 1978, including nearly five hundred in Italy, which dominated the market. Most spaghetti Westerns filmed between 1964 and 1978 were made on low budgets, and shot at Cinecittà Studios and various locations around southern Italy and Spain.

Leone's films and other core spaghetti Westerns are often described as having eschewed, criticized or even "demythologized" many of the conventions of traditional U.S. Westerns. This was partly intentional, and partly the context of a different cultural background. In 1968, the wave of spaghetti Westerns reached its crest, comprising one-third of the Italian film production, only to collapse to one-tenth in 1969. Spaghetti Westerns have left their mark on popular culture, strongly influencing numerous works produced in and outside of Italy.

Sergio Leone is the most famous director of spaghetti Westerns. His Dollars Trilogy, starring Clint Eastwood as the Man with No Name, includes the films A Fistful of Dollars (1964), For a Few Dollars More (1965) and The Good, the Bad and the Ugly (1966). The series has become known for establishing the spaghetti Western genre, and inspiring the creation of many more spaghetti Western films. The three films are consistently listed among the best-rated Western films in history. Apart from these films, Leone also directed Once Upon a Time in the West (1968) and Duck, You Sucker! (1971). Apart from Leone, other notable spaghetti Western directors include Sergio Corbucci, who made the films Django (1966) and The Great Silence (1968), and Enzo Barboni, who made the films They Call Me Trinity (1970) and its sequel Trinity Is Still My Name (1971). Other notable spaghetti Westerns include Death Rides a Horse (1967) and My Name Is Nobody (1973).

=== Splatter films ===
A splatter film is a subgenre of horror films that deliberately focuses on graphic portrayals of gore and graphic violence. These films, usually through the use of special effects, display a fascination with the vulnerability of the human body and the theatricality of its mutilation. The term was popularized by John McCarty's 1981 book Splatter Movies, subtitled: Breaking The Last Taboo: A Critical Survey of the Wildly Demented Sub Genre of the Horror Film that Is Changing the Face of Film Realism Forever.

The first splatter film to popularize the subgenre was George A. Romero's Night of the Living Dead (1968), the director's attempt to replicate the atmosphere and gore of EC's horror comics on film. Initially derided by the American press as "appalling", it quickly became a national sensation, playing not just in drive-ins but at midnight showings in indoor theaters across the country. George A. Romero coined the term "splatter cinema" to describe his film Dawn of the Dead (1978).

Splatter films are often also body horror films, and such films were very popular in the 1980s. Important examples include Basket Case (1982), The Thing (1982), The Toxic Avenger (1984), Re-Animator (1985), The Fly (1986), Class of Nuke 'Em High (1986), From Beyond (1986), Hellraiser (1987), Street Trash (1987), Brain Damage (1988) and Society (1989).

=== Stoner films ===
Stoner film is a subgenre of comedy film based on marijuana themes, where recreational use often drives the plot, sometimes representing cannabis culture more broadly or intended for that audience.

Many stoner movies have certain elements and themes in common. The template involves protagonists who have marijuana, are attempting to find marijuana, or have some other task to complete. The protagonists are often two friends in a variation of the buddy film. Stoner films often involve evading authority figures who disapprove of the protagonists' marijuana usage, usually out of a greater lack of acceptance of their lifestyle of leisure and innocence. Authority figures are often law-enforcement agents, who are portrayed as comically inept, as well as parents, co-workers, friends, and security guards. Most serious moments in stoner films are intended ironically, often to parody overwrought counterparts in mainstream cinema. The comic story arcs often approach or fall over the line into slapstick.

The midnight movie scene in theaters of the 1970s revived the hectoring anti-drug propaganda film Reefer Madness (1938) as an ironic counterculture comedy. The duo Cheech & Chong established the archetypal "stoner" comedy throughout the 1970s, taking their antics to the big screen for Up in Smoke (1978), establishing the contemporary stoner film genre. Later examples of the subgenre include the high school comedies Fast Times at Ridgemont High (1982) and Class of Nuke 'Em High (1986).

=== Vansploitation films ===
Vansploitation is a term and film genre used to describe American independent films from the 1970s, in which a van or vans are the main key element to the plot, and feature comedic stories about young adults. The short-lived genre emerged in the United States during the early 1970s, exploiting the popularity of vans with young adults, and was very popular in the mid to late 1970s, but quickly fell off after the 1970s. Vansploitation films were originally made mostly for young audiences.

An example of vansploitation is Up in Smoke (1978), in which two stoner musicians unknowingly smuggle a van - made entirely of marijuana - from Mexico to Los Angeles.

=== Vetsploitation films ===
Vetsploitation is a film genre and term used to describe exploitation films in which a military veteran is the main element to the plot. Vetsploitation developed in the 1970s, as B movies featuring veterans who were vilified and became antiheroes.

In American cinema, vetsploitation films are often about Vietnam War veterans. They also often deal with post-traumatic stress disorder, which came into use in the 1970s, in large part due to the diagnoses of U.S. military veterans of the Vietnam War. Therefore, vetsploitation films are not war films; rather, they deal with the aftermath of the war. Important examples include Taxi Driver (1976), Rolling Thunder (1977), The Ninth Configuration (1980) and First Blood (1982).

=== Vigilante films ===
The vigilante film is a film genre in which the protagonist or protagonists engage in vigilante behavior, taking the law into their own hands. Vigilante films are usually revenge films in which the legal system fails protagonists, leading them to become vigilantes. They may be ordinary citizens who cannot find help within the system, or policemen who feel thwarted by the system.

In United States cinema, vigilante films gained prominence during the 1970s. The Los Angeles Times reported, "Vigilante vengeance was the cinematic theme of the 1970s, flourishing in the more respectable precincts of the new American cinema even as it fueled numerous exploitation flicks." These films were rooted in 1970s unease over government corruption, failure in the Vietnam War, and rising crime rates. They reflect the rising political trend of neoconservatism.

Important vigilante films made in the 1970s include Dirty Harry (1971), Coffy (1973), Death Wish (1974), Foxy Brown (1974), Taxi Driver (1976), Rolling Thunder (1977) and Mad Max (1979).

=== Zombie films ===
Zombies are fictional creatures usually portrayed as reanimated corpses or virally infected human beings. They are commonly portrayed as cannibalistic in nature. While zombie films generally fall into the horror genre, some cross over into other genres, such as action, comedy, science fiction, thriller, or romance. Distinct subgenres have evolved, such as the "zombie comedy" or the "zombie apocalypse".

Victor Halperin's White Zombie (1932) is often cited as the first zombie film. I Walked with a Zombie (1943), Plan 9 from Outer Space (1957) and The Last Man on Earth (1964) are other important early zombie films.

Inspired by the zombie of Haitian folklore, the modern zombie emerged in popular culture during the latter half of the twentieth century, with George A. Romero's seminal film Night of the Living Dead (1968). A decade later, Romero made Dawn of the Dead (1978), which was the most commercially successful zombie film at the time. The Italian film Zombi 2 (1979) by Lucio Fulci was an unofficial sequel to Dawn of the Dead, which was released in Italy under the title Zombi. Fulci's films in his Gates of Hell trilogy, namely City of the Living Dead (1980), The Beyond (1981) and The House by the Cemetery (1981) are also zombie films. Romero followed his previous two zombie films with Day of the Dead (1985). Other important zombie films from the 1980s are Re-Animator (1985), The Return of the Living Dead (1985), Night of the Creeps (1986) and The Serpent and the Rainbow (1988).

== Minor subgenres ==
- Argentine sex comedy: Sexual comedy films made in Argentina, which were popular in the 1970s and 1980s.
- Commedia sexy all'italiana: A subgenre of the Italian commedia all'italiana film genre, characterized typically by both abundant female nudity and comedy, and by the minimal weight given to social criticism that was instead basic in the commedia all'italiana main genre.
- Hong Kong Category III films: According to the Hong Kong motion picture rating system introduced in 1988, the restriction applicable to Category III films is thus defined: "No persons younger than 18 years of age are permitted to rent, purchase, or watch this film in the cinema."
- Luchador films: Mexican professional wrestling/action/science-fiction/horror films starring some of the most popular masked luchadores in Lucha Libre.
- Mexican sex comedy: A subgenre of comedy film in the Mexican cinema, with storylines typically combining sexploitation and Mexploitation.
- Mexploitation: A film genre of low-budget films that combine elements of an exploitation film and Mexican culture or portrayals of Mexican life within Mexico often dealing with crime, drug trafficking, money and sex.
- Mondo film: A subgenre of exploitative documentary films, many of which are made in a way to resemble a pseudo-documentary and usually depicting sensational topics, scenes, or situations.
- Narco pelicula: A sub-genre of Mexican cinema's action film and Mexploitation genres, which deals with movies about drug trafficking and drug cartels, usually but not exclusively fictitious ones.
- Nikkatsu Roman Porno films: A series of theatrical Japanese softcore pornographic films produced by the movie studio Nikkatsu from November, 1971, until May, 1988.
- Pink film: Japanese movies produced by independent studios that include nudity (hence 'pink') or deal with sexual content, which became popular in the mid-1960s and made up a large part of the Japanese domestic market through the mid-1980s.
- Pornochanchada: A genre of sex comedy films (chanchada means a kind of light comedy, a burlesque) produced in Brazil that was popular from the late 1960s through the 1970s.
- Rumberas film: A film genre that flourished in the Golden Age of Mexican cinema in the 1940s and 1950s, whose major stars were the so-called rumberas, dancers of Afro-Caribbean musical rhythms.
- Turksploitation: Turkish low-budget exploitation films that are either remakes of, or use unauthorized footage from, popular foreign films (particularly Hollywood movies) and television series, produced mainly in the 1970s and 1980s.
- Women-in-prison film: Films that feature imprisoned women who are subjected to sexual and physical abuse, typically by sadistic male or female prison wardens, guards and other inmates.

== Legacy ==
The style and aesthetic of exploitation films directly inspire some contemporary directors. Tim Burton has employed the imagery and camera work of movies including the 1957 film The Curse of Frankenstein into his own style, and his direction takes some inspiration from exploitation horror and science fiction films from the 1950s and 1970s. Tarantino is another director whose filmography pays homage to and adopts many characteristics of exploitation films by mixing style and genre, using motifs that evoke exploitation-era style and character design. Tarantino has cited Hong Kong martial arts films and blaxploitation as early influences in his career.

Low-budget horror films continue to be successful. The Terrifier films are a recent example of the slasher genre. Directed by Damien Leone, the first and second installments, released in 2016 and 2022, had respective budgets of $55,000 and $250,000. The third film, Terrifier 3, was released in October 2024 and had a budget of $2 million. Terrifier 3 grossed over $18 million in its opening weekend, topping the box office and overtaking Joker: Folie à Deux. It is the highest-grossing unrated film of all time.

== See also ==
- B movie
- Cult film
- Extreme cinema
- Midnight movie
- Transgressive art
- Video nasty
- Z movie
