= Not Quite Hollywood: The Wild, Untold Story of Ozploitation! =

2008 documentary film directed by Mark Hartley

- Promotional poster
- Directed by: Mark Hartley
- Written by: Mark Hartley
- Produced by: Michael Lynch; Craig Griffin
- Cinematography: Karl von Möller
- Edited by: Jamie Blanks; Sara Edwards; Mark Hartley
- Music by: Stephen Cummings; Billy Miller
- Production companies: Australian Film Finance Corporation; City Films Worldwide; Madman Entertainment; Film Victoria; Melbourne International Film Festival Premiere Fund; SBS independent
- Distributed by: Madman Films (Australia); Magnet Releasing (United States)
- Release date: 28 August 2008
- Running time: 103 minutes
- Countries: Australia; United States
- Language: English

Not Quite Hollywood: The Wild, Untold Story of Ozploitation! is a 2008 documentary film about the Australian New Wave of 1970s and 1980s low-budget cinema. The film was written and directed by Mark Hartley, who interviewed over eighty Australian, American and British actors, directors, screenwriters and producers, including Quentin Tarantino, Brian Trenchard-Smith, Jamie Lee Curtis, Dennis Hopper, George Lazenby, George Miller, Barry Humphries, Stacy Keach, Glory Annen, John D. Lamond, John Seale and Roger Ward.

Hartley spent several years writing a detailed research document, which served to some degree as a script for the film, about the New Wave era of Australian cinema. It focused on the commonly overlooked "Ozploitation" films—mainly filled with sex, horror and violence—which critics and film historians considered vulgar and offensive, often excluded from Australia's "official film history". Hartley approached Quentin Tarantino, a longtime "Ozploitation" fan who had dedicated his 2003 film Kill Bill to the exploitation genre, and Tarantino agreed to help get the project off the ground. Hartley then spent an additional five years interviewing subjects and editing the combined 250 hours of interviews and original stock footage into a 100-minute film.

Not Quite Hollywood, which premiered at the 2008 Melbourne International Film Festival, did not perform well at the box office upon its Australia-wide release, but garnered universally positive reviews from critics and a nomination for "Best Documentary" at the 2008 Australian Film Institute Awards.

== Synopsis ==
Not Quite Hollywood documents the revival of Australian cinema during the Australian New Wave of the 1970s and 1980s through B-movies including Alvin Purple, Barry McKenzie Holds His Own, Dead End Drive-In, Long Weekend, Mad Max, The Man from Hong Kong, Patrick, Razorback, Road Games, Stork and Turkey Shoot. From 1971 through to the late 1980s, Australian directors took advantage of the newly introduced R-rating which allowed more on-screen nudity, sex and violence for audiences restricted to age 18 and over. "Ozploitation"—writer-director Mark Hartley's own portmanteau of "Australian exploitation"—was a subgenre of the New Wave which accounted for the critically panned "gross-out comedies, sex romps, action and road movies, teen films, westerns, thrillers and horror films" of the era, commonly overlooked in Australia's "official film history". The film addresses three main categories of "Ozploitation" films: sex, horror and action.

== Production ==
"As a kid my parents and teachers insisted I see quality films like Picnic at Hanging Rock. Then I saw this movie Patrick, about a telekinetic coma victim, on commercial TV late one night and it thrilled, excited and downright scared me, just like the horror films made in the U.S. but with our voices, faces and places. I didn't know we could do that."

— Mark Hartley

As a child, Mark Hartley discovered many of the "Ozploitation" B-movies from the 1970s and '80s while watching late-night television, but was disappointed when they were completely overlooked in books he read detailing Australian cinema. After becoming an accomplished music video director, his interest in this era of Australian filmmaking grew and he spent years researching a potential documentary film. He was close to giving up on the project when he sent a 100-page draft of the script to American film director Quentin Tarantino, not expecting to receive a reply. Tarantino was a longtime fan of "Ozploitation" films and had even dedicated his film Kill Bill to Brian Trenchard-Smith's work. He replied the day after, telling Hartley that he would do whatever he could to get the film made. Hartley traveled to Los Angeles, California to meet with Tarantino, who agreed to sit for hours of interviews as one of the film's most prominent interviewees. Hartley spent the following five years interviewing other actors, directors, screenwriters and producers, collecting original stock footage, and then cutting the 100 hours of interviews and 150 hours of film footage down into a 100-minute film.

== Release ==
Not Quite Hollywood had its worldwide premiere at the Melbourne International Film Festival on 28 July 2008, and was screened at the Australian Centre for the Moving Image. Its Australia-wide release was a month later, on 28 August 2008, and it had its overseas premiere at the Toronto International Film Festival on 7 September 2008, where distribution rights were secured for the United Kingdom, Canada, France, Russia, Germany and Benelux. The film was also screened at the Austin, Sitges, Warsaw, Helsinki and Stockholm International Film Festivals in 2008, and featured at the London Film Festival on 25 October 2008.

The film did not perform well at the box office upon its Australian release, taking in a gross of A$108,330 on its first weekend but only $31,995 on its second weekend at a screen average of $681 on 47 screens.

== Reception ==
Overall, Not Quite Hollywood received positive reviews from critics. On the review aggregator website Rotten Tomatoes, 95% of 65 critics' reviews are positive, with an average rating of 7.5/10. The website's consensus reads: "A raucous, fast-paced celebration of the Ozploitation films that came out of Australia in the 1970s and 1980s." Margaret Pomeranz and David Stratton of At the Movies gave the film four and three and a half out of five stars respectively; Pomeranz commended Hartley for "the depth of his research and for creating a wildly entertaining film experience", and claimed that "for those of us who remember the films, Not Quite Hollywood is a blast". Sandra Hall, writing for The Sydney Morning Herald, gave the film three and a half out of five stars, believing that "Hartley's own film is much livelier than most of those he is out to celebrate". Jake Wilson of The Age similarly gave the film three and a half stars, but called the film "basically a feature-length advertisement for its subject", saying that it "moves far too rapidly to permit sustained analysis". The Courier-Mail's Des Partidge, who gave the film four and a half out of five stars, disagreed, saying that "Brisk editing means the history is lively and fun", and claimed in homage to The Castle, "Copies of Hartley's film should go straight to pool rooms all over Australia when it becomes available on DVD." while Leigh Paatsch wrote for the Herald Sun that "there is not a single instant where boredom can possibly intrude", dubbing the film "an incredibly energetic and merrily messed-up celebration of Australian B-movies".

English director Edgar Wright named Not Quite Hollywood his fourth favourite film of 2008, and called it "the best documentary ever."

Roadgames (Richard Franklin, Australia, 1981) features in Not Quite Hollywood: The Wild, Untold Story of Ozploitation!, with Jamie Lee Curtis in a publicity still.

=== Awards and nominations ===
Award	Category	Subject	Result
AACTA Award (51st Australian Film Institute Awards)	AFI Documentary Trailblazer	Mark Hartley	Won
AACTA Award (51st Australian Film Institute Awards)	Best Feature Length Documentary	Craig Griffin; Michael Lynch	Won
AACTA Award (51st Australian Film Institute Awards)	Best Editing in a Documentary	Jamie Blanks; Sara Edwards	Nominated
AFCA Awards	Best Documentary	Mark Hartley	Won
Warsaw International Film Festival	Best Documentary	Mark Hartley	Nominated

== Box office ==
Not Quite Hollywood: The Wild, Untold Story of Ozploitation! grossed only $186,986 at the box office in Australia.

== See also ==
- Cinema of Australia
- American Grindhouse, a 2010 documentary about American exploitation films
- Electric Boogaloo: The Wild, Untold Story of Cannon Films, a 2014 film by Hartley about Cannon Films
