= Road Games =

Road Games, roadgame, or variation, may refer to:

- Road game, a sports game where the specified team plays outside of their home venue
- Road Games (EP), a 1983 EP by Allan Holdsworth, and the title track
- Roadgame, a 1981 album by Art Pepper, and the title track
- Road Games (film), a 2015 British-French thriller film
- Roadgames, a 1981 Australian thriller film
  - Roadgames: Original Soundtrack Recording, soundtrack album for the film
- roadkill, game animals killed on the road
- car games, games played on long road trips
- dangerous driving, playing games on the road with a motor vehicle's driving

== See also ==
- Games Road, Cockfosters, London, England, UK; a street
- Road (disambiguation)
- Games (disambiguation)
