= Ludgrove Hall =

Coordinates: 51.65511°N 0.15867°W

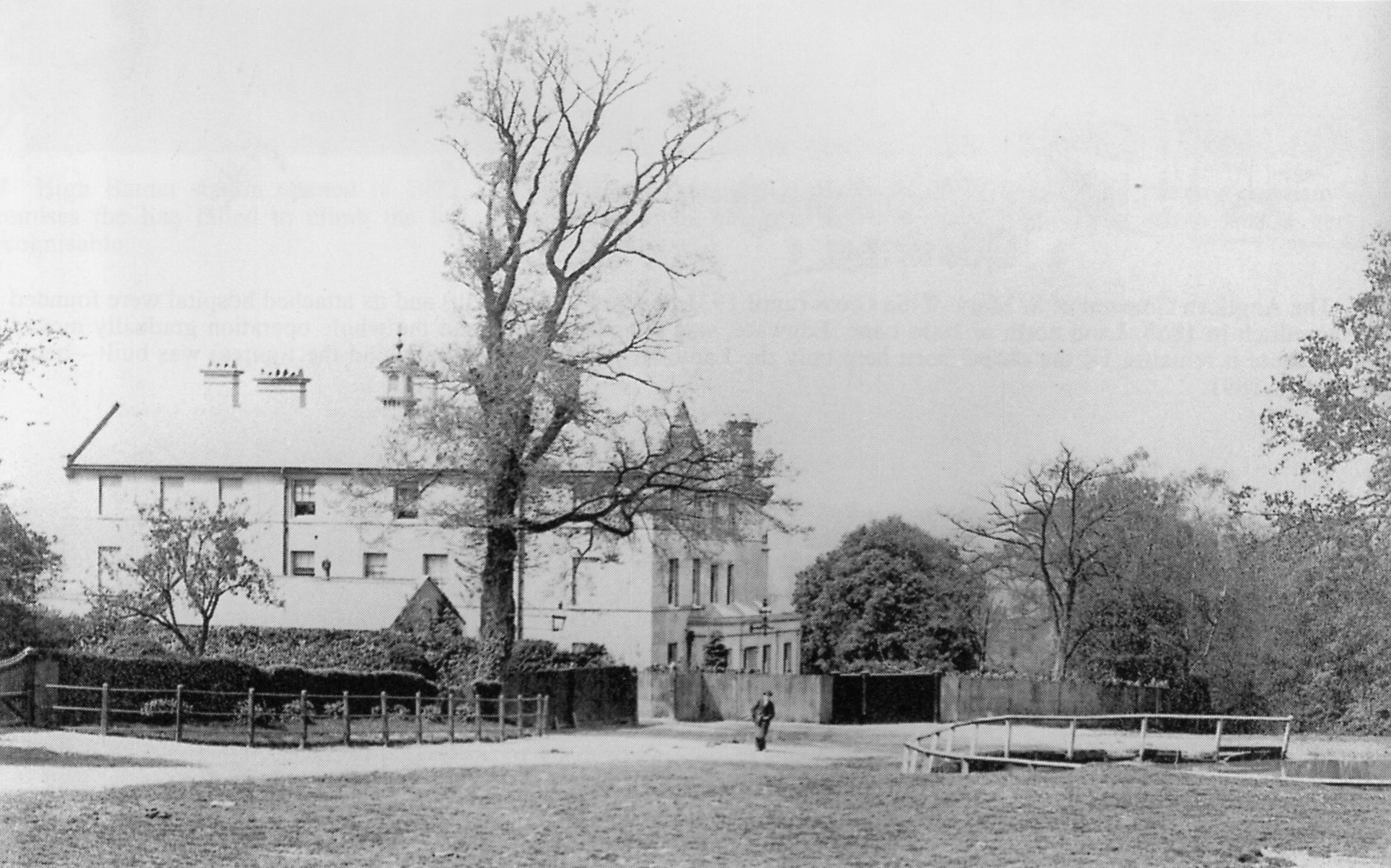
Ludgrove Hall c.1880

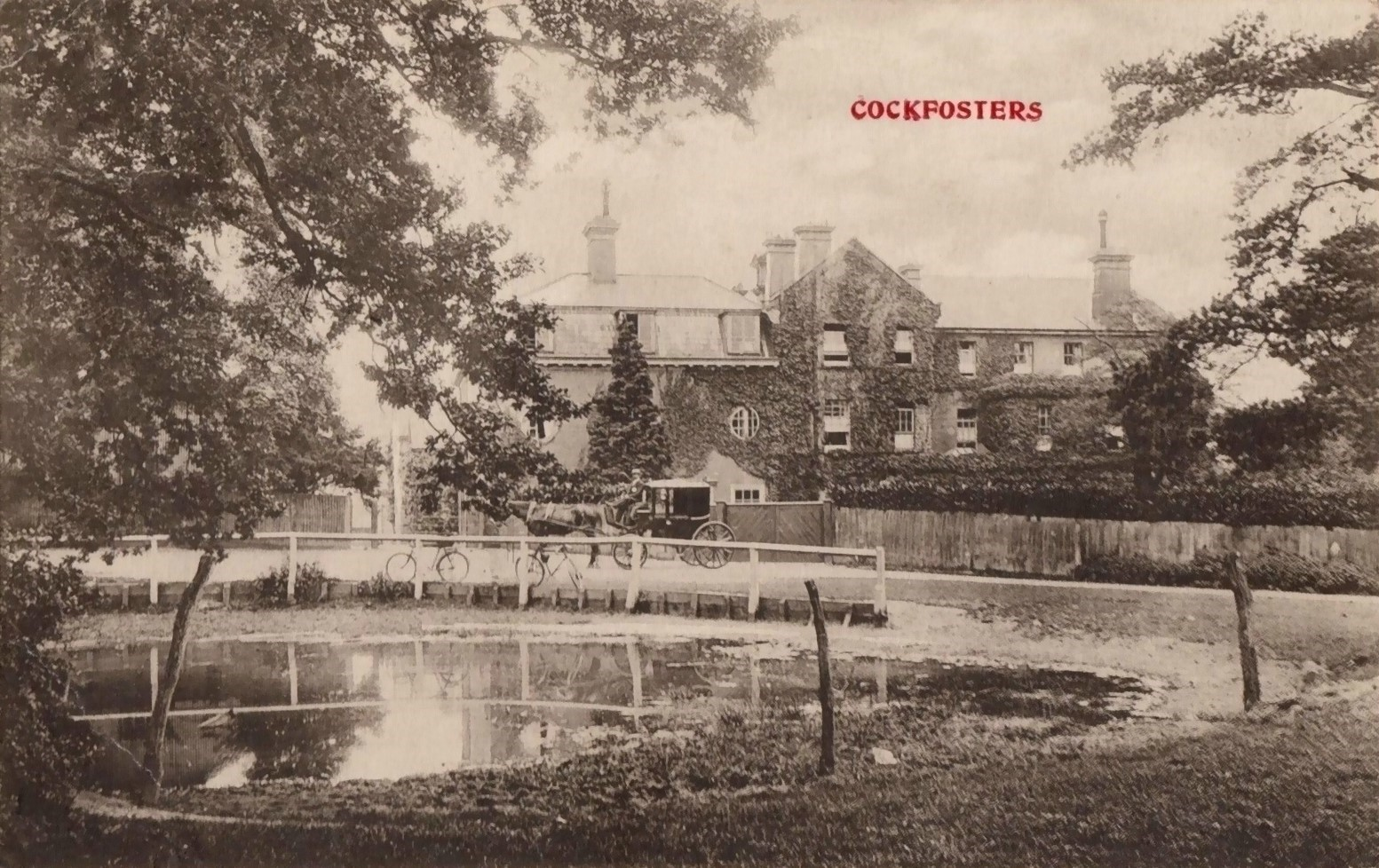
Ludgrove Hall on a postcard of around 1900

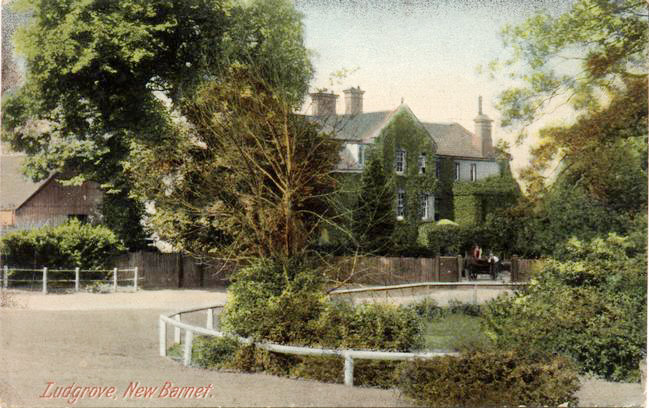
Ludgrove Hall

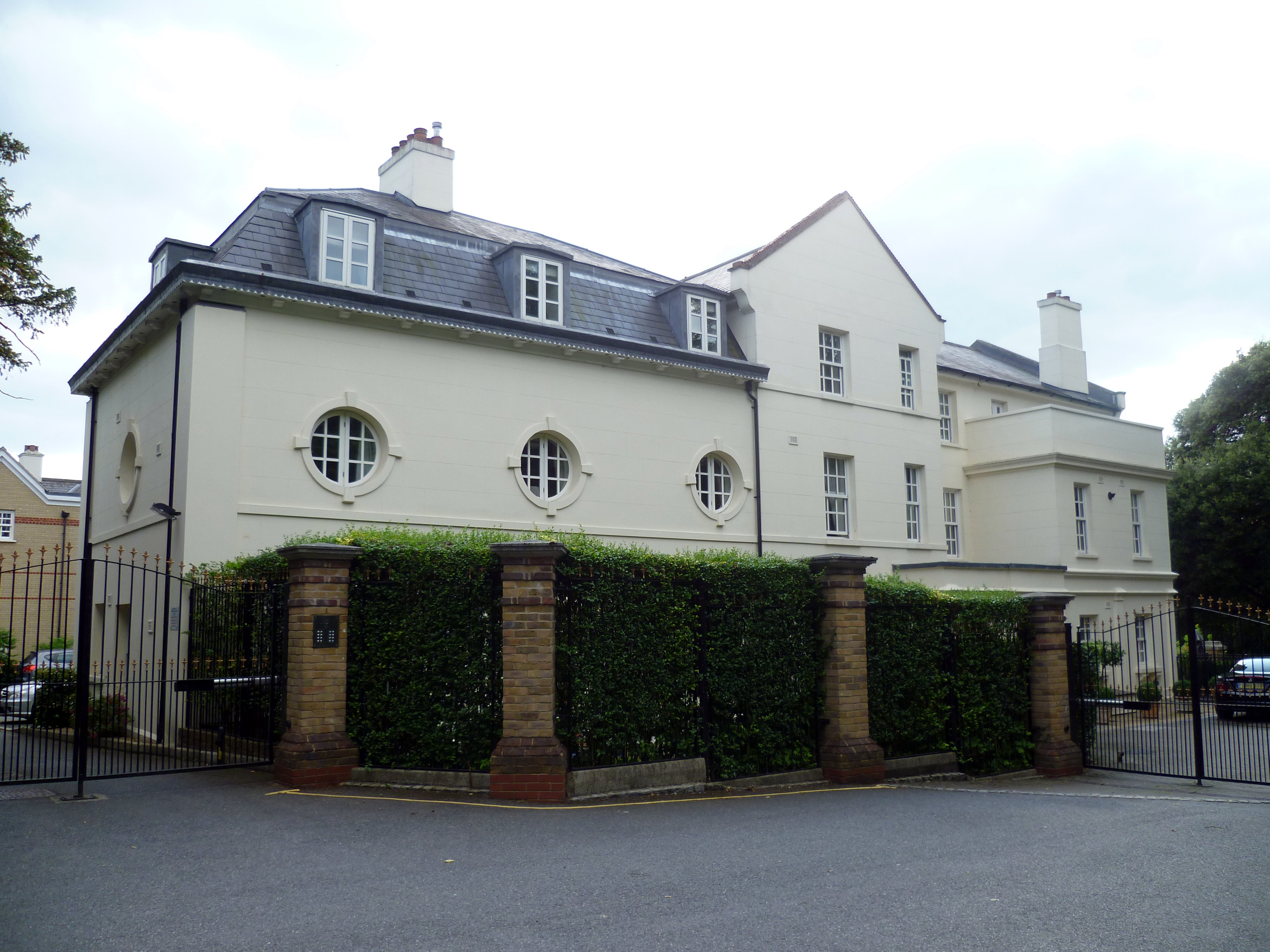
Ludgrove Hall in 2015.

Ludgrove Hall is an historic manor house in the parish of Monken Hadley, formerly within the county of Middlesex. Today the property has been overtaken by the suburbs of North London, and is situated on Games Road, Cockfosters, on the edge of Monken Hadley Common. It was originally a private home but then became Ludgrove School and has now been converted to flats. Additional buildings have since been constructed in the grounds.Following compulsory purchase it was used as residential accommodation for students at Trent Park College of Education in 1960s and 70s. This was later taken over by Middlesex University.

== Background ==
The Hall was built on land that was originally part of the Ludgrove (or Ludgraves) estate and it was known as Ludgrove Farm before 1422, in the original sense of the word "farm" denoting a form of tenure, not meaning an agricultural business. As the parish of Monken Hadley was a possession of Walden Abbey, following the Dissolution of the Monasteries the parish and its constituent estates were transferred to the Crown in 1542. Having been sold by the crown, the estate of Ludgrove was later owned by Sir Roger Wilbraham who in 1612 built almshouses in the village of Monken Hadley. It was once known as the Blue House and appears in that name on Francis Russell's 1776 map of Enfield Chase.

== The house ==
The current house dates from the 1830s and was the home of Francis Bevan until 1890 when Bevan moved to Trent Park following his father's death.

From 1892 the house was Ludgrove School, a boys preparatory school, until the school moved to Wokingham in 1937. The school was founded in 1892 by Arthur Dunn in north London. Dunn, a footballer, recruited a number of sportsmen to assist him as masters and was succeeded, on his premature death, by two England international football captains, G.O. Smith and William Oakley, who became joint headmasters. According to Nancy Clark, it was a "famous preparatory school for Eton" attended by young Royals and sons of the aristocracy. Pupils at Ludgrove Hall included Osbert Sitwell, John Dunville VC, and Prince Alexander of Yugoslavia. Ex-pupil Alistair Horne wrote an unflattering account of his time at the school in the 1930s in which he described "humbug, snobbery and rampant, unchecked bullying" which he thought was intended to toughen the boys up.

The house was built for redevelopment in 1939 but no action was taken due to the Second World War. It was compulsorily purchased in 1950. In the 1980s and 90s the building was used as accommodation and a conference centre for Middlesex Polytechnic, later Middlesex University.

Around 1999, the building was converted into apartments by St James Homes and detached houses built in the grounds.
