= Ludgrove =

Coordinates: 51°39′19″N 0°09′31″W

Ludgrove, or Ludgrave, or Ludgraves, was an estate and farm in Middlesex between Monken Hadley in the west and Cockfosters in the east in what is now north London. It was centered on Ludgrove Farm (the Blue House) near to Cockfosters.

== History ==
The Ludgrove estate may have derived its name from William Lyghtgrave who in 1423 conveyed it to William Somercotes, Thomas Frowke, and other parties. At that time it consisted of a messuage (probably the farm house near Cockfosters) and 120 acres of land, 80 of wood in Hadley. and 80 of meadow.

The land was transferred to the Crown in 1542.

At the start of the reign of Elizabeth I, Thomas Tyndale, later the member of Parliament for Marlborough, was living at Ludgrove when the estate was stated to have been formerly held by John Perte.

It was later owned by Sir Roger Wilbraham who built almshouses in nearby Monken Hadley in 1612.

Ludgrove Hall was built on the site of the farm in the 1830s and was the home of Francis Bevan and then Ludgrove School which has since moved to Wokingham.
