= Alan Barber =

English cricketer

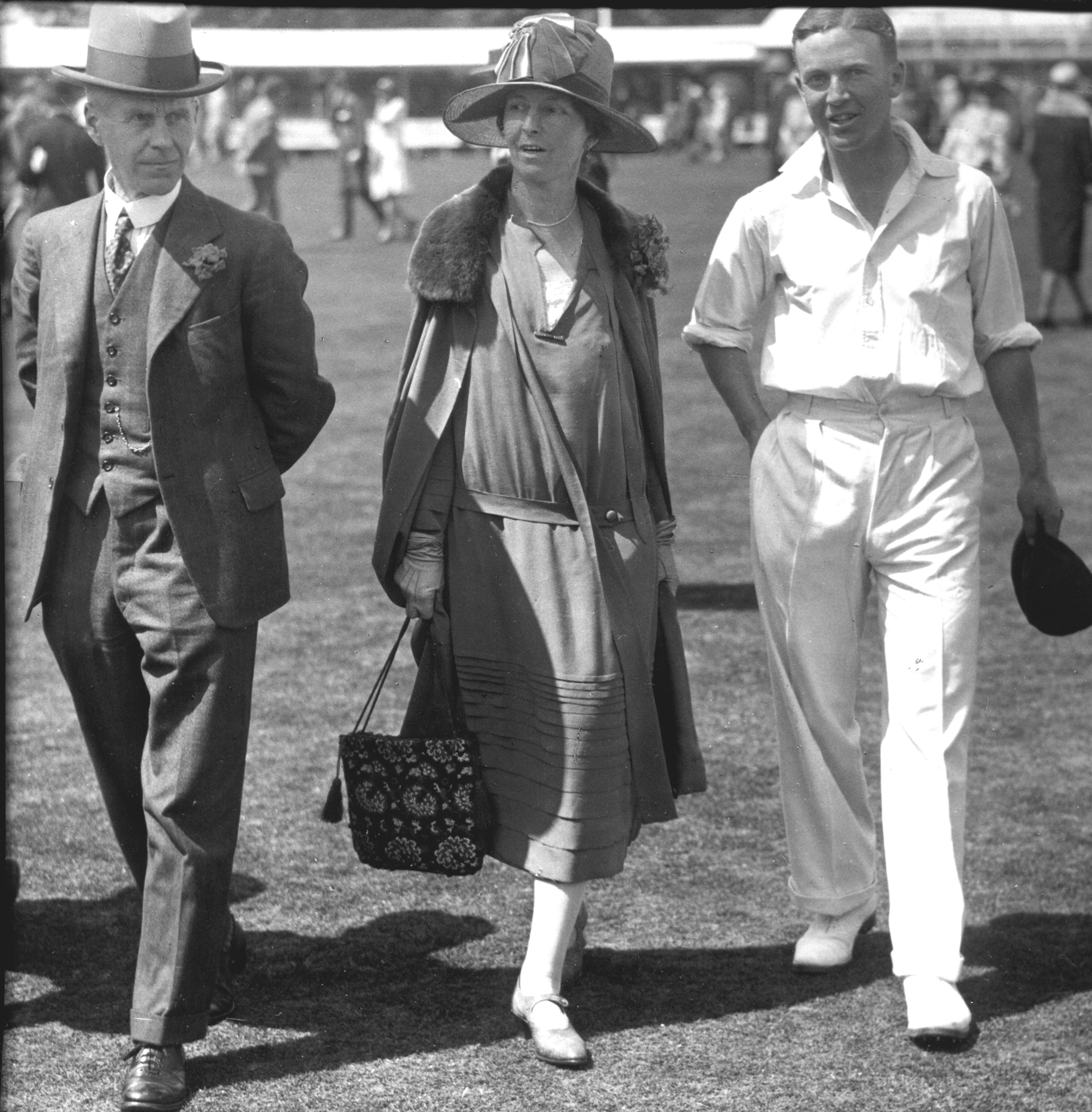
- Alan Barber (right) with his parents after a game as captain of Oxford University

Personal information
- Full name: Alan Theodore Barber
- Born: June 17, 1905; Ecclesall, Sheffield, Yorkshire, England
- Died: 10 March 1985 (aged 79); Ludgrove, Wokingham, Berkshire, England
- Batting: Right-handed

Domestic team information
- Years: Team
- 1927–1929: Oxford University
- 1929–1930: Yorkshire

Career statistics
Competition	First-class
Matches	70
Runs scored	2,261
Batting average	23.30
100s/50s	2/13
Top score	119
Balls bowled	6
Wickets	0
Bowling average	–
5 wickets in innings	–
10 wickets in match	–
Best bowling	–
Catches/stumpings	52/–
- Source: Cricinfo, 18 May 2020

Alan Theodore Barber (17 June 1905 – 10 March 1985) was an English amateur first-class cricketer, who played for Yorkshire County Cricket Club from 1929 to 1930. He also played for Oxford University, and appeared in a total of 70 first-class matches.

== Life and career ==
Barber was born in Ecclesall, Sheffield, Yorkshire, England, and educated at Shrewsbury School and The Queen's College, Oxford. He played in 27 cricket matches for Oxford University between 1927 and 1929, and in 42 for Yorkshire. Barber was captain of Oxford in 1929 and of Yorkshire in 1930, and was awarded his county cap the same season. He was a double blue in golf and cricket.

He scored two hundreds, both in 1929: 119 against Nottinghamshire for Oxford, and 100 for Yorkshire against an England XI a few weeks later. He scored 2,261 runs, at an average of 23.30, took 52 catches, and bowled one maiden over.

After one year as Yorkshire's captain, in which he brought order to the team and prepared the way for Yorkshire's dominance in the 1930s, Barber left cricket in his mid-twenties to pursue a career in teaching. He was headmaster of Ludgrove School from 1937 to 1973. He died, aged 79, in Ludgrove, Wokingham, Berkshire, England, in March 1985.
