= Thomas Tyndale =

16th-century English politician

Thomas Tyndale (1528/33 – 1571) was the member of the Parliament of England for Marlborough for the parliament of April 1554.

He was a nephew of William Tyndale, the Biblical translator. At the start of the reign of Elizabeth I, Tyndale was living at Ludgrove in Middlesex, on an estate formerly held by his brother-in-law John Perte.
