= Roadgames (soundtrack) =

Roadgames: Original Soundtrack Recording

Soundtrack album by Brian May
- Released: 1992 (1M1CD1014)
- Recorded: 1981
- Genre: Score
- Language: English
- Label: 1M1 Records
- Producer: Philip Powers

Brian May chronology
| SNAPSHOT | Roadgames: Original Soundtrack Recording | PATRICK |

Roadgames: Original Soundtrack Recording is the soundtrack album from the 1981 Australian film Roadgames.

== Album Information ==
This CD features music by the composer Brian May for Richard Franklin and Everett De Roche's films Roadgames and Patrick.

== Track List ==
Roadgames
1. Main Title / On the Road / The Icebox / It's the End of the World / No More Games
2. Hitch's theme / Morning Scene
3. The Chase
4. Quid Investigates / What's the Matter, Buddy?”
5. Quid Inspects Meat
6. Hallucinating
7. Final Pursuit
8. Collision / High Jump
9. Closing Titles
10. Hitch's theme

Patrick
11. Main Title
12. Matricide
13. The Flat
14. The Intruder
15. Room 15
16. You Can Feel
17. Bossa for Ed
18. Kathy's tune
19. The Trance
20. Patrick Power
21. Kathy's theme
22. The Strobe
23. Exit Matron
24. Kathy Looks for Ed
25. Dr Roget
26. The Needle
27. Kathy Returns
28. I'm Going Now
29. He's Dead
30. End Title

== Credits ==
Engineer - Roger Savage
Soundtrack album producer Philip Powers
Artwork - Alex Cotton
Mastering - Meredith Brooks
Booklet Notes - Richard Franklin, Director of Patrick and Roadgames
