= Gerard Lee Bevan =

- Born: 9 November 1869
- Died: 24 April 1936 (aged 66); Havana, Cuba
- Education: Eton College; Trinity College, Cambridge
- Occupation: Banker
- Spouse: 2, including Sophie Kenrick
- Parent: Francis Bevan
- Relatives: Silvanus Bevan (paternal great-great-grandfather); David Bevan (paternal great-grandfather); Robert Cooper Lee Bevan (paternal grandfather)

Gerard Lee Bevan (9 November 1869 – 24 April 1936) was a British financier, the man "most responsible for the entire City Equitable debacle", and "a daring and unprincipled scoundrel". In December 1922 he was convicted at the Old Bailey of fifteen charges of fraud and sentenced to seven years' penal servitude.

== Early life ==
Gerard Lee Bevan was born on 9 November 1869. He was the fourth son of Francis Bevan, chairman of Barclays Bank from 1896 to 1916.

He was educated at Eton and Trinity College, Cambridge.

== Career ==
Bevan became a stockbroker with Ellis & Co, an established and reputable City firm. He was successful and respected until his crash in the 1920s.

While chairman of the City Equitable Fire Insurance Co. In a major 1925 court case, Re City Equitable Fire Insurance Co, the company lost £1,200,000 (equivalent to £63,080,000 in 2025) in failure of investments and the large scale fraud of the chairman. The liquidator sued the other directors for negligence. The auditors were sued too, but the Court of Appeal held they were honest and exonerated by provisions in the company’s articles.

== Personal life ==
He married Sophie Kenrick, also from a wealthy family, Midlands industrialists related to the Chamberlains. They bought 21 Upper Grosvenor Street in Mayfair, London, and Bevan collected Chinese porcelain. He was also a "serial adulterer, treating glamorous mistresses ostentatiously".

He married twice, had issue and died in Havana, Cuba on 24 April 1936.
