= Re City Equitable Fire Insurance Co =

UK company law case

- Court: Court of Appeal of England and Wales
- Citations: [1925] Ch 407, 94 LJ Ch 445, [1925] B & CR 109, [1924] All ER Rep 485, 133 LT 520, 40 TLR 853

Case history
- Prior action: Romer J (in the High Court)

Court membership
- Judges sitting: Lord Pollock MR Warrington LJ and Sargant LJ

Keywords
- Duty of care

Re City Equitable Fire Insurance Co [1925] Ch 407 is a UK company law case concerning directors' duties, and in particular the duty of care. It is no longer good law, as it stipulated that a "subjective" standard of competence applied. Now under Companies Act 2006 section 174, and given the development of the common law in Re D'Jan of London Ltd, directors owe an objective standard of care based on what should reasonably be expected from someone in their position.

== Facts ==
The company lost £1,200,000 in failure of investments and the large scale fraud of the chairman, Gerard Lee Bevan, ‘a daring and unprincipled scoundrel’. The liquidator sued the other directors for negligence. The auditors were sued too, but the Court of Appeal held they were honest and exonerated by provisions in the company’s articles.

== Judgment ==
=== High Court ===
Romer J held that some of the directors did breach their duty of care. But they were not liable to reimburse, because an exclusion clause for negligence was valid. And even in absence of exclusion clauses, in his view, ‘for a director acting honestly himself to be held legally liable for negligence, in trusting the officers under him not to conceal from him what they ought to report to him appears to us to be laying too heavy a burden on honest businessmen.’ Though he felt ‘some difficulty’ with the distinction, negligence would need to be ‘gross’ to visit liability. The principles he set out as follows.

There are, in addition, one or two other general propositions that seem to be warranted by the reported cases: (1.) A director need not exhibit in the performance of his duties a greater degree of skill than may reasonably be expected from a person of his knowledge and experience. A director of a life insurance company, for instance, does not guarantee that he has the skill of an actuary or of a physician. In the words of Lindley M.R.: "If directors act within their powers, *429 if they act with such care as is reasonably to be expected from them, having regard to their knowledge and experience, and if they act honestly for the benefit of the company they represent, they discharge both their equitable as well as their legal duty to the company": see Lagunas Nitrate Co. v. Lagunas Syndicate. It is perhaps only another way of stating the same proposition to say that directors are not liable for mere errors of judgment. (2.) A director is not bound to give continuous attention to the affairs of his company. His duties are of an intermittent nature to be performed at periodical board meetings, and at meetings of any committee of the board upon which he happens to be placed. He is not, however, bound to attend all such meetings, though he ought to attend whenever, in the circumstances, he is reasonably able to do so. (3.) In respect of all duties that, having regard to the exigencies of business, and the articles of association, may properly be left to some other official, a director is, in the absence of grounds for suspicion, justified in trusting that official to perform such duties honestly. In the judgment of the Court of Appeal in In re National Bank of Wales, Ld, the following passage occurs in relation to a director who had been deceived by the manager, and managing director, as to matters within their own particular sphere of activity: "Was it his duty to test the accuracy or completeness of what he was told by the general manager and the managing director? This is a question on which opinions may differ, but we are not prepared to say that he failed in his legal duty. Business cannot be carried on upon principles of distrust. Men in responsible positions must be trusted by those above them, as well as by those below them, until there is reason to distrust them. We agree that care and prudence do not involve distrust; but for a director acting honestly himself to be held legally liable for negligence, in trusting the officers under him not to conceal from him what they ought to report to him, appears to us to be laying too heavy a burden on honest business men." That case went to the House of Lords, and is reported there under the name of Dovey v Cory Lord Davey, in the course of his speech to the House, made the following observations:

"I think the respondent was bound to give his attention to and exercise his judgment as a man of business on the matters which were brought before the board at the meetings which he attended, and it is not proved that he did not do so. But I think he was entitled to rely upon the judgment, information and advice, of the chairman and general manager, as to whose integrity, skill and competence he had no reason for suspicion. I agree with what was said by Sir George Jessel in Hallmark's Case, and by Chitty J. in In re Denham & Co. 84, that directors are not bound to examine entries in the company's books. It was the duty of the general manager and (possibly) of the chairman to go carefully through the returns from the branches, and to bring before the board any matter requiring their consideration; but the respondent was not, in my opinion, guilty of negligence in not examining them for himself, notwithstanding that they were laid on the table of the board for reference."

These are the general principles that I shall endeavour to apply in considering the question whether the directors of this company have been guilty of negligence.

=== Court of Appeal ===
Pollock MR Warrington LJ and Sargant LJ upheld Romer J's decision.

== See also ==
- UK company law
