= 21 Upper Grosvenor Street =

Townhouse in Mayfair, London

- Interactive map of the 21 Upper Grosvenor Street area

General information
- Type: Residential
- Architectural style: Edwardian Baroque
- Location: London, England
- Coordinates: 51°30′37″N 0°09′20″W
- Completed: 1732, refronted 1909

Design and construction
- Architects: Benjamin Denne, refronted by Ralph Knott and E. S. Collins

Listed Building – Grade II
- Official name: 21, UPPER GROSVENOR STREET W1
- Designated: 01 December 1987
- Reference no.: 1066191

21 Upper Grosvenor Street is a Grade II listed townhouse on Upper Grosvenor Street in the Mayfair area of London.

== History and description ==
The building was originally built in 1732 by mason Benjamin Denne and first occupied by Leonard Smelt by 1734. Various modifications were made to the building in the 18th and 19th centuries. Between 1908 and 1910, the house was refronted in Portland stone by Ralph Knott, architect of County Hall, and E. S. Collins for Gerard Bevan. It was completed in a baroque style, more architecturally adventurous than the similarly refronted neighbours to either side. Certain elements in particular were contentious with Eustace Balfour, the estate surveyor, but the design was eventually accepted by the Duke of Westminster. In 2020 the house was put up for sale with an asking price of £54.5 million.

== See also ==
- 26 Upper Brook Street
