= Francis Bevan =

British banker

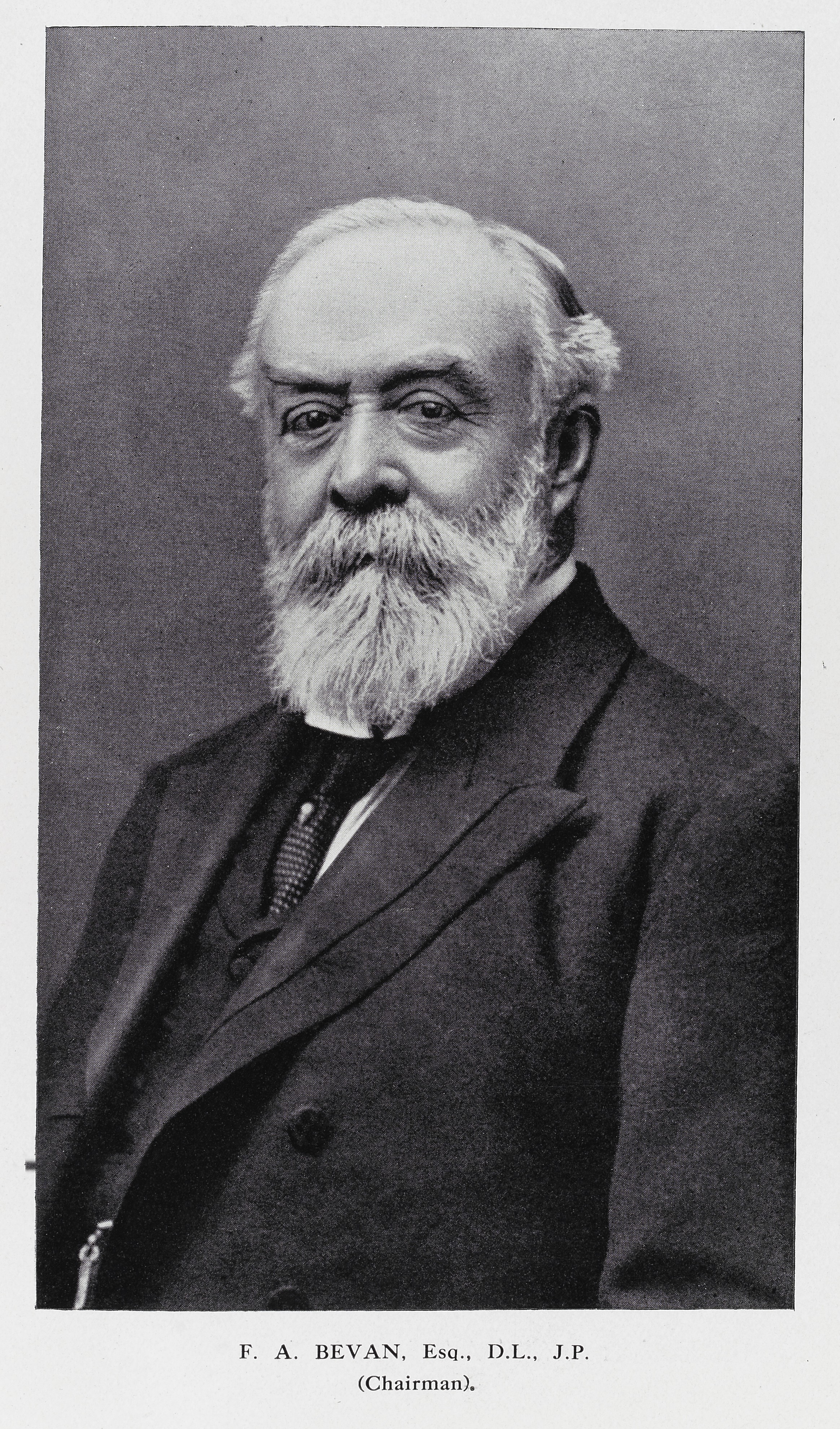
- Francis Bevan
- Born: 17 January 1840
- Died: 31 August 1919 (aged 79)
- Education: Harrow School
- Occupation: Banker
- Spouses: Elizabeth Marianne Russell; Constance Hogg; Maria Trotter
- Parent: Robert Cooper Lee Bevan

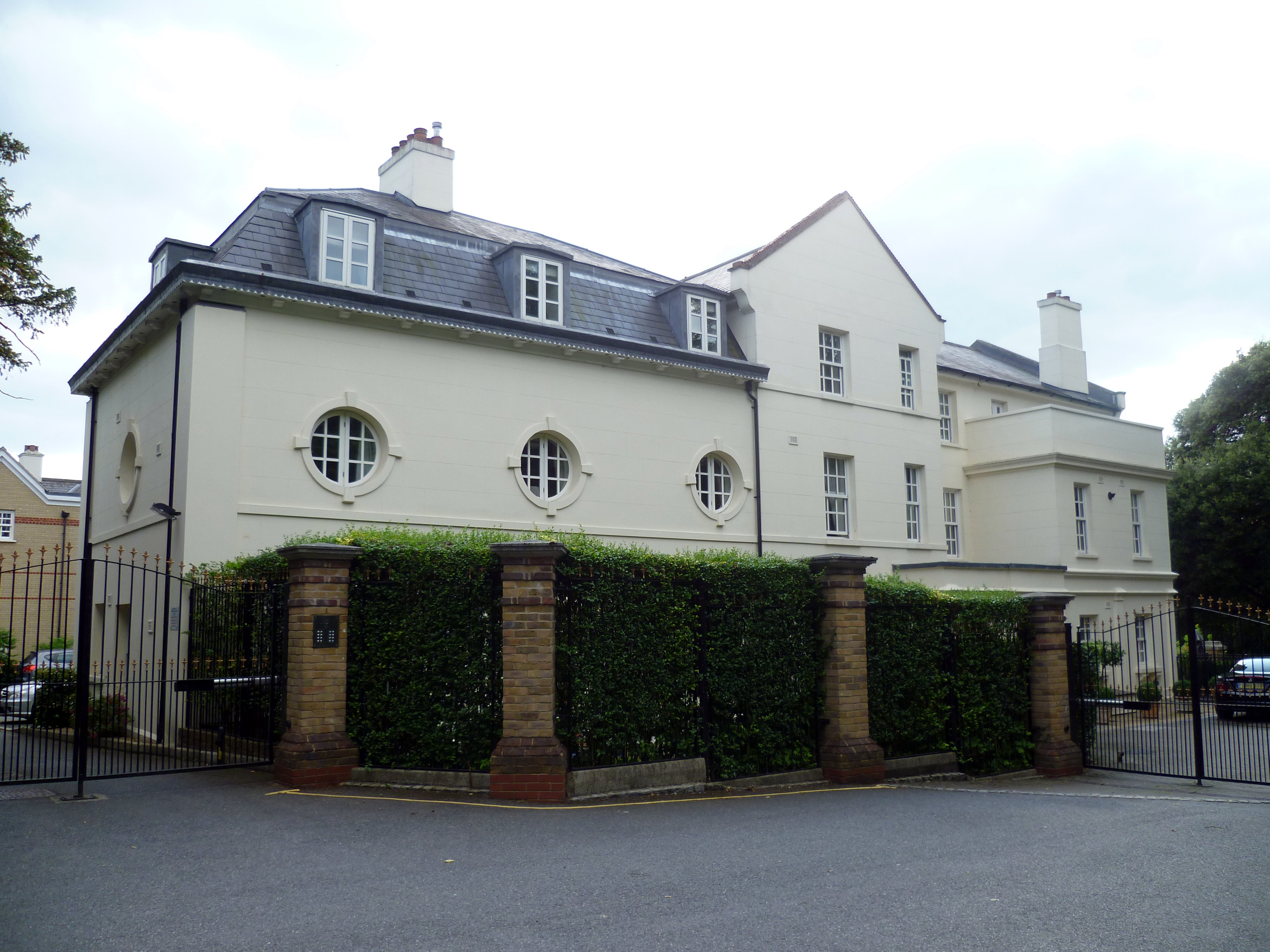
Ludgrove Hall, the former home of Bevan, later became Ludgrove School and has now been converted to flats.

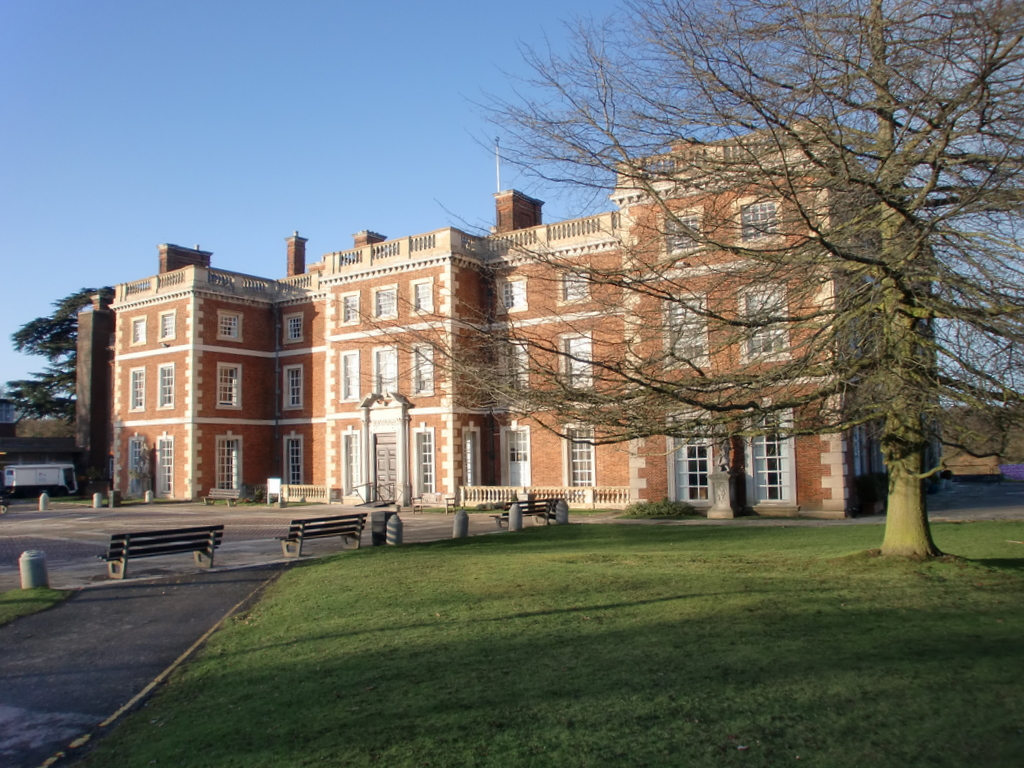
Trent Park

Francis (Frank) Augustus Bevan (17 January 1840 – 31 August 1919) was a British heir and banker. He served as the chairman of Barclays Bank, a British multi-national financial institution, serving from 1896 to 1916.

== Early life ==
Francis Augustus Bevan was born on 17 January 1840, the second son of Robert Cooper Lee Bevan (1809-1890). Bevan was educated at Harrow School, a private boarding school in north-west London.

== Career ==
He became a partner in Barclay, Bevan, Tritton and Co in 1859, and eventually succeeded his father as senior partner. In 1896, Barclays merged with a number of mostly private banks to become a joint stock enterprise. Bevan was the last senior partner of the private bank and the first chairman of the new bank, Barclay and Company Limited.

Under his leadership, Barclays became one of the Big Five UK banks. He remained a director until his death. He also served as Lord Lieutenant of the City of London, a JP, and as High Sheriff of Middlesex.

== Personal life ==
He was married and widowed three times.

On 22 July 1862, he married Elizabeth Marianne Russell, the daughter of the politician Lord Charles Russell and Isabella Clarisa Davies. On 19 April 1866, he married Constance Hogg, the daughter of the politician Sir James Hogg, 1st Baronet and Mary Claudine Swinton. In 1875, he married Maria Trotter.

Until 1890, he lived at Ludgrove Hall, Cockfosters. Following his father's death in 1890, he moved to nearby Trent Park.

He was the churchwarden of Christ Church, Cockfosters, the church founded by his father.

His third son, Raymond Francis Bevan, was a cleric, vicar of St Lawrence, Thanet from 1907 to 1921.

His fourth son, Gerard Lee Bevan, was a leading financier and infamous fraudster.

== Death ==
Bevan died on 31 August 1919.
