= William Oakley (footballer) =

English sportsperson (1873–1934)

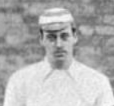
- Oakley with Corinthians in 1894

Personal information
- Date of birth: 27 April 1873
- Place of birth: Shrewsbury, England
- Date of death: 18 September 1934 (aged 61)
- Place of death: Carlisle, England
- Position: Full back

Youth career
- Shrewsbury School XI

Senior career*
Years	Team	Apps	(Gls)
1893–1896	Oxford University		
1894–1903	Corinthian	121	(1)
- Casuals

International career
1895–1901	England	16	(0)
- * Club domestic league appearances and goals

William John Oakley (27 April 1873 — 20 September 1934) was an English footballer who played as a full-back for the renowned amateur clubs, Corinthians and Casuals, and captained the England team once, in 1901. In 1895, he was also the British long jump champion.

== Early life and education ==
Born at 34 Castle Street, Shrewsbury, Shropshire, he was the eldest of five children of William Oakley, a brewer, and his wife Emilie Ann (nee Pike). Oakley was educated at Shrewsbury School, which he attended from 1884 to 1892 and Christ Church, Oxford, graduating to Master of Arts (M.A.). Oakley played football for his school from 1887 to 1892, becoming captain of his side; rowed for his school from 1890 to 1892, and was senior whip (1890) and huntsman (1891) of the Shrewsbury School Hunt (in fact a cross country running club).

After going up to Oxford, Oakley became President of the Oxford University Athletics Club in 1895, representing the university in long jump and 120 yard hurdles, in addition to weights and hammer throwing in 1896. He was a Blue in football annually from 1893 to 1896. He won the AAA Championships long jump title at the 1895 AAA Championships.

== Club career ==
Oakley played, in total, 121 games for Corinthian FC, in which he scored just 1 goal. Playing games against all the great professional sides of the era, Oakley was an assured defender whose peak years for the club were the 1898/99 season and the 1899/1900 season, during which he rarely missed a match. He would then play for Casuals F.C.

== International career ==
Oakley made his England debut in a 1–1 draw against Wales during the 1894–95 British Home Championship. He would go on to win a total of 16 England caps between 1895 and 1901, and won his only game as captain against Ireland in the 1900–01 British Home Championship, England winning 3–0.

== Cricket ==
Oakley also played cricket at club level for Shrewsbury and appeared at county level for Shropshire in one match in 1900 when he made 20 runs.

== Personal life ==
He was a close friend of the England centre forward G. O. Smith, with whom he served as joint secretary of the Corinthians from 1898 to 1902 and worked as a schoolmaster, and eventually as joint headmaster from 1901 to 1934, of Ludgrove School after retiring from football.

Oakley retired from teaching earlier in 1934 and at the time of his death had purchased a house in Church Stretton, Shropshire, to which he was moving.

He died from a fractured skull at Cumberland Infirmary, Carlisle, Cumberland, in September 1934 aged 61 following injuries sustained in a road accident when driving home after a holiday in Scotland. He was unmarried.

His funeral took place on 21 September 1934 at St Mary's Church, Shrewsbury, followed by interment at Shrewsbury General Cemetery.

Preceded by G. O. Smith	England football captain 1901	Succeeded by Ernest Needham
