= Games Road =

Road in Cockfosters, London

Coordinates: 51.6550°N 0.1557°W

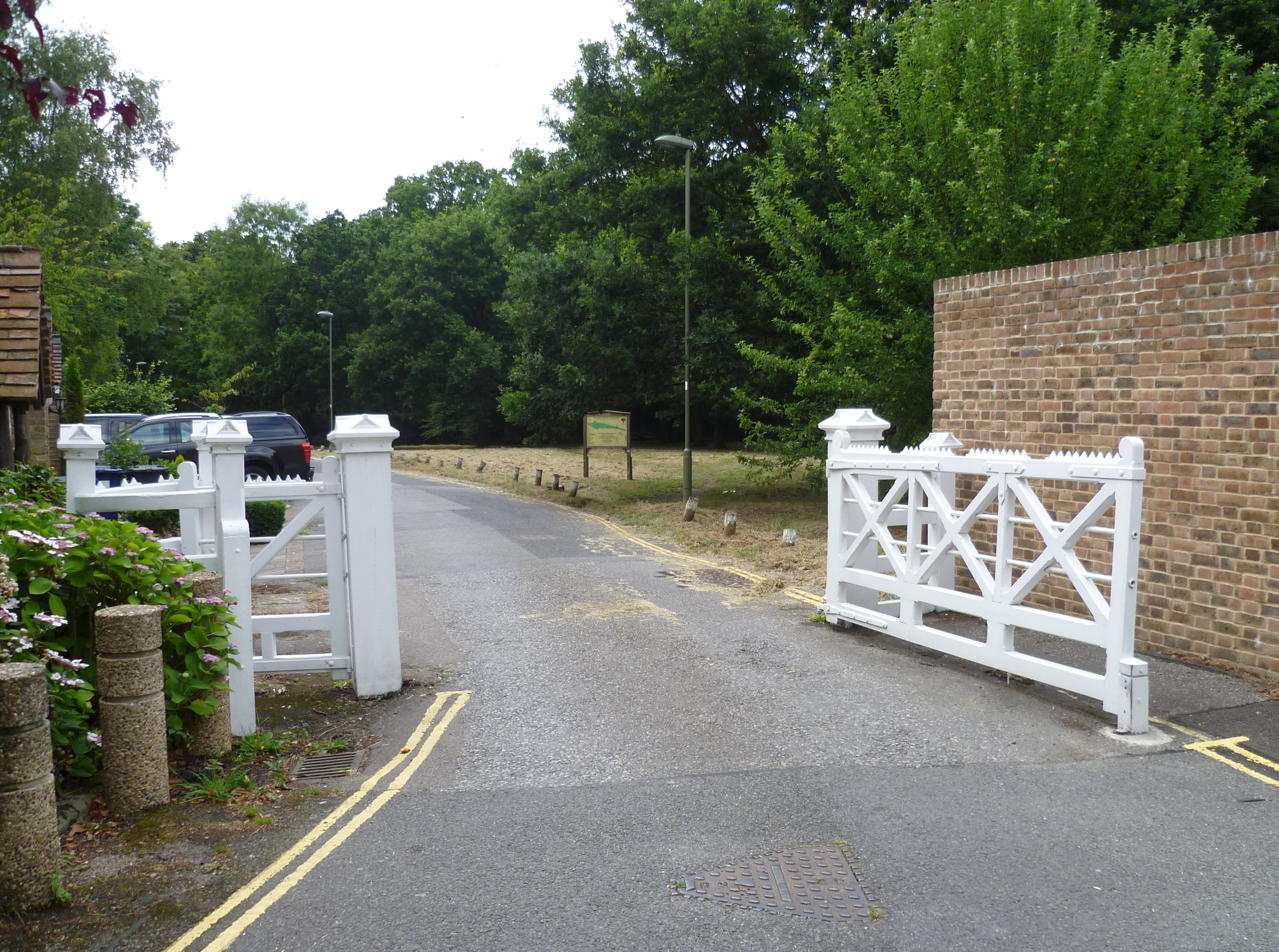
Monken Hadley Common gates at Games Road

Games Road is a road in Cockfosters, Greater London, that runs from Chalk Road in the east into Monken Hadley Common in the west. The road falls into the Monken Hadley Conservation Area.

== History and character ==
The road was originally part of an ancient bridleway that ran from Cockfosters to Monken Hadley. Gates halfway down Games Road mark the transition from public road to land that is part of the Common and Games Road continues westwards onto the common as a single track tarmacked way, the border of the Common being marked by white posts. The gates are grade II listed by Historic England.

== Buildings ==
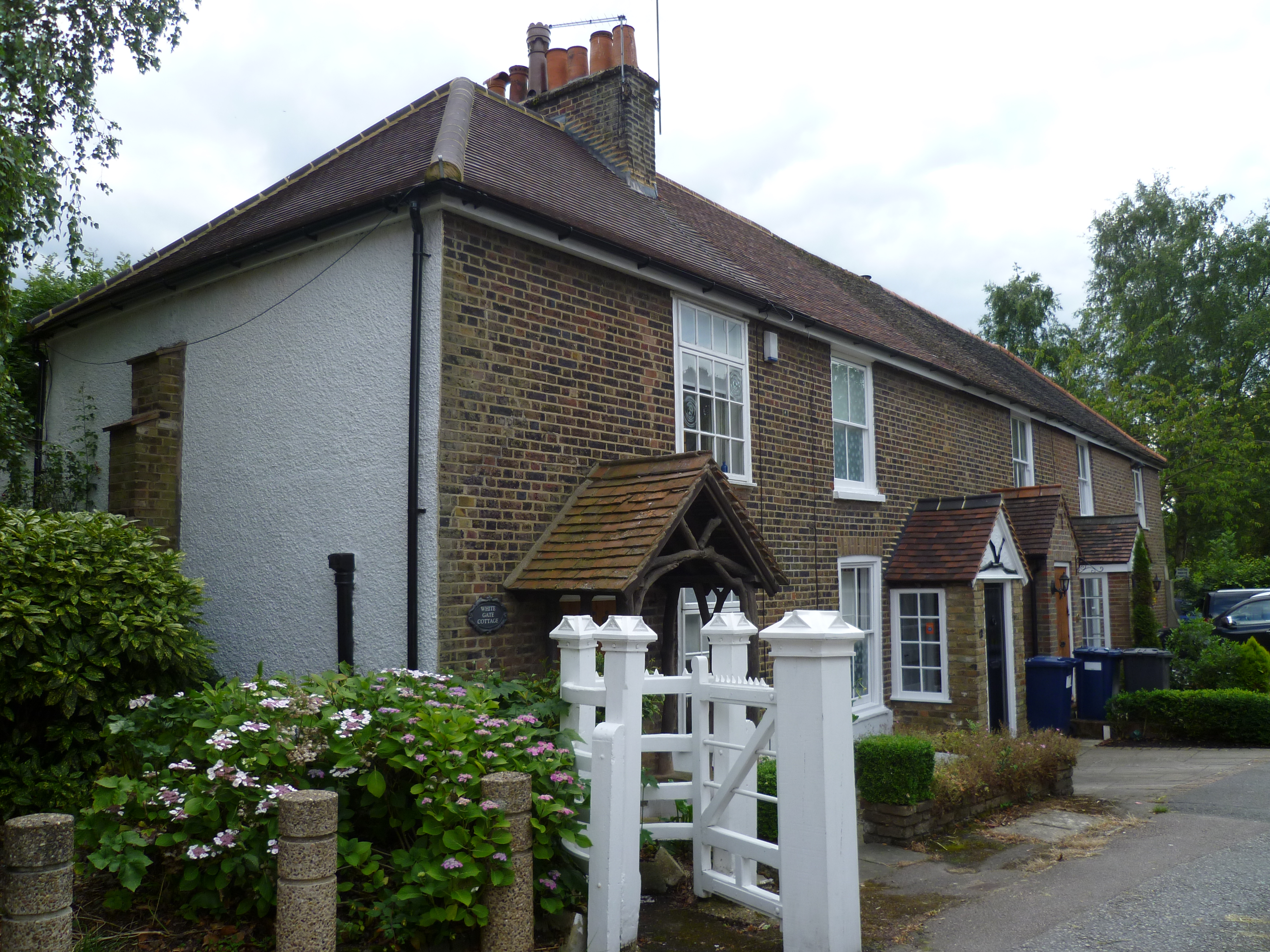
The locally listed cottages in Games Road.

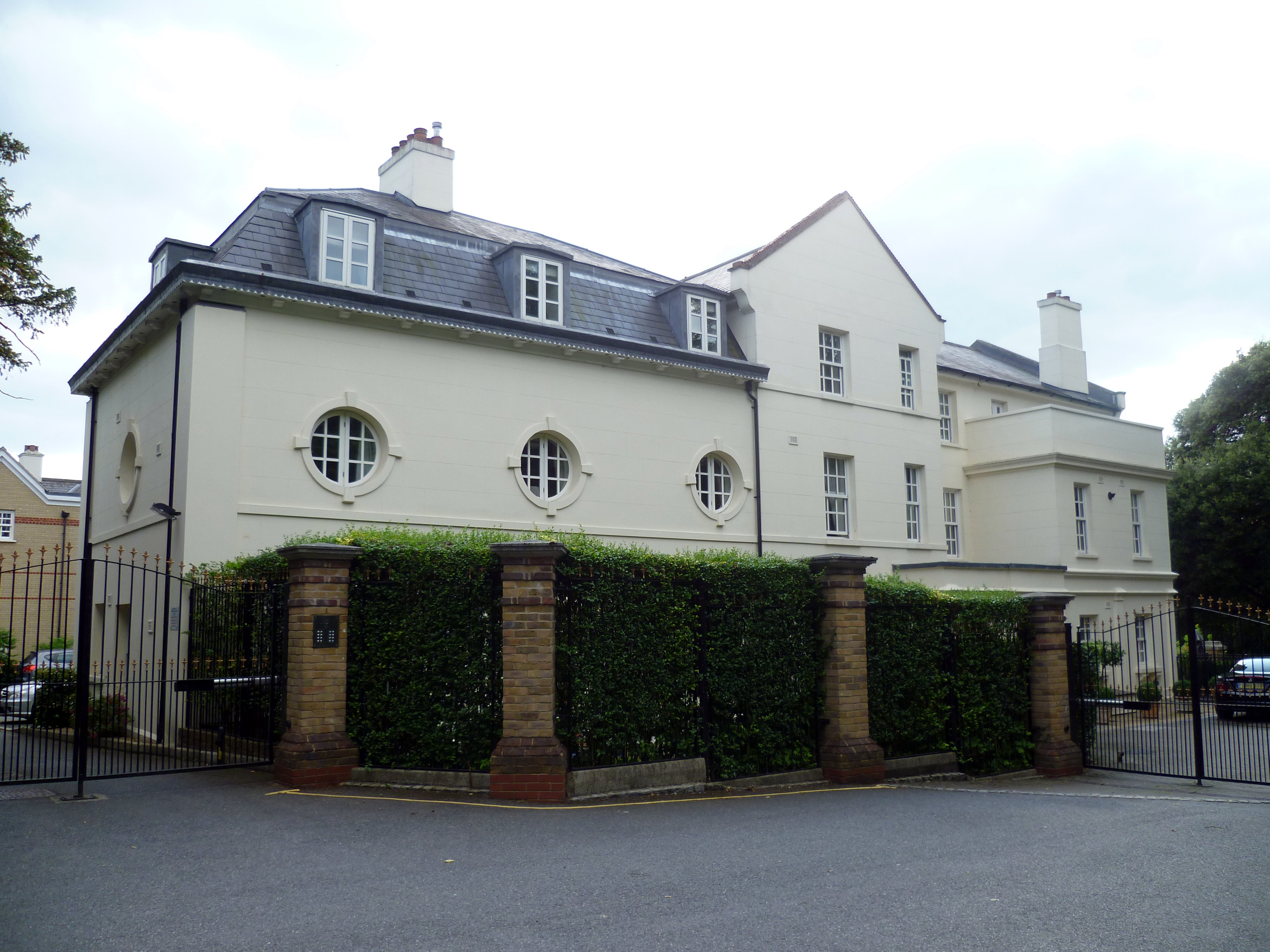
Ludgrove Hall at the western end of Games Road

Three cottages (1750) adjacent to the white gates are locally listed with the London Borough of Barnet.

Ludgrove Hall, a former private home, then a school, now flats, is located at the western end of Games Road on the south side.

== Pathways ==
In addition to pathways on the Common, the London Loop passes along Games Road.
