= Ludgrove School =

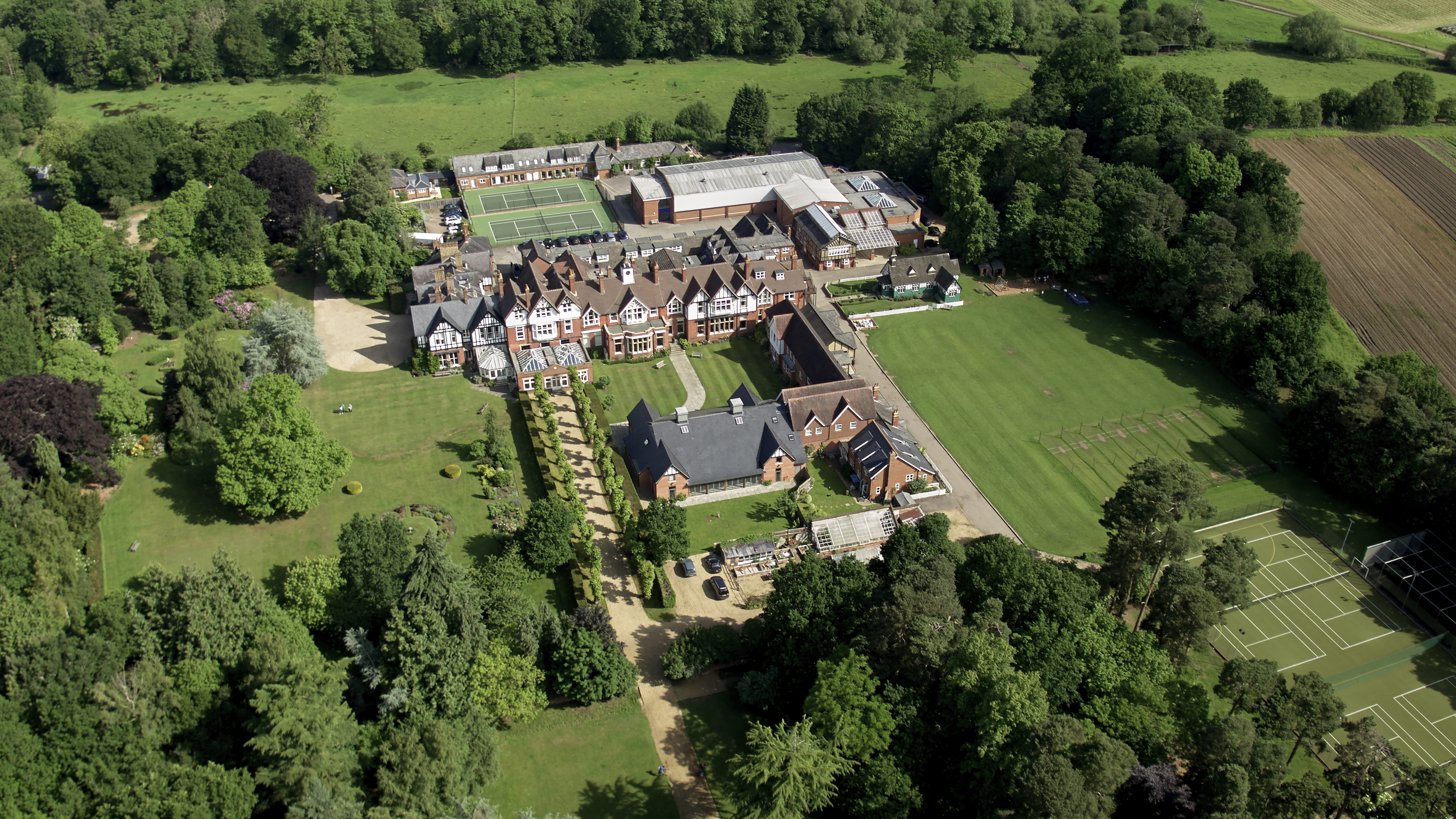
- Ludgrove School badge Aerial view of Ludgrove School

Location
- Ludgrove; Wokingham, Berkshire, RG40 3AB; England; 51.400°N 0.826°W

Information
- Type: Private preparatory boarding school
- Motto: Whatever Thy Hand findeth to do, do it with all thy might.(Ecclesiastes 9:10 )
- Religious affiliation: Church of England
- Established: 1892
- Founder: Arthur Dunn
- Department for Education URN: 110138 Tables
- Chairman of the governors: Philip Edey
- Headmaster: Simon Barber
- Staff: 50
- Gender: Boys
- Age: 8 to 13
- Enrolment: 200
- Houses: Jellicoe, Kitchener, Haig, Drake, Wellington, Nelson
- Colours: Blue and white
- Former pupils: Old Ludgrovians
- Website: http://www.ludgrove.net/

Ludgrove School is an 8–13 private boys' preparatory boarding school in Wokingham, England. Ludgrove was founded in 1892 at Ludgrove Hall in Middlesex by the Old Etonian sportsman Arthur Dunn. Dunn had been employed as a master at Elstree School, which sent boys mainly to Harrow, and intended to nurture a school that focused on preparing boys to enter Eton. His educational philosophy was atypical by the standards of the time: discipline was applied with a lighter touch, and masters were neither discouraged from mixing with pupils outside the classroom, nor from being on familiar terms with the headmaster.

Growing quickly thanks to the circle of friends Dunn had gathered in the course of his football and cricket career, Ludgrove soon became associated with families from the British aristocracy and landed gentry. Since 1937 it has been based at a site near Wokingham in Berkshire, having taken over the former buildings of Wixenford School.

== History ==
=== 1892–1937 ===
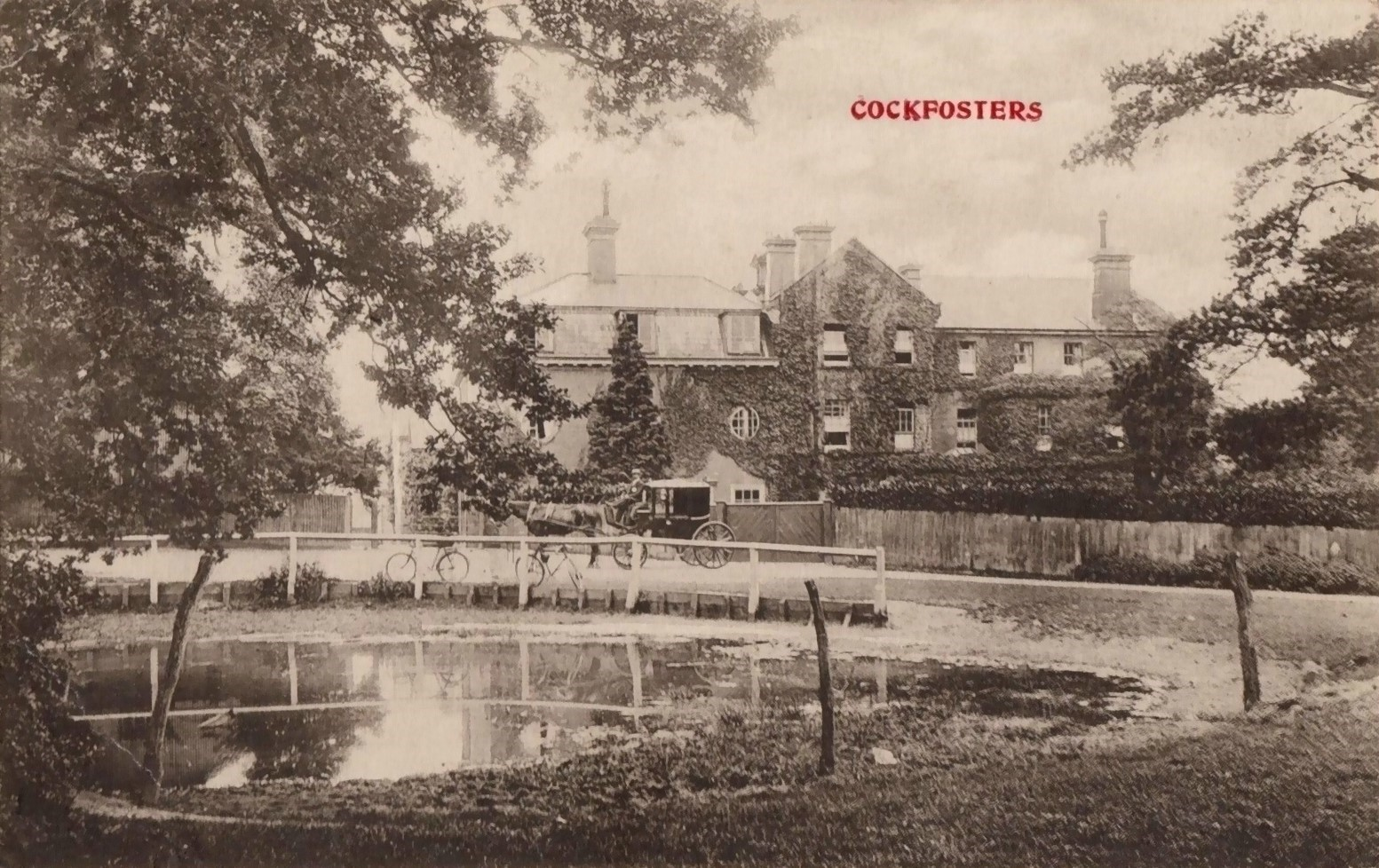
Ludgrove Hall

Ludgrove School was established in 1892 at Ludgrove Hall by former footballer Arthur Dunn. Dunn believed the atmosphere of a prep school should be pleasant rather than repressive, which largely contrasted with the nature of other prep schools of the time. A sport enthusiast, Dunn tended to recruit teachers who were scholar-athletes like himself. Dying prematurely of a heart attack in 1902, he was succeeded by two joint headmasters, G.O. Smith and William Oakley, both former captains of the England national football team, who ran the school as a partnership until Smith retired in 1922.

On the prevalence of bullying at Ludgrove in the first decades of its existence, recollections of old boys differed. Alistair Horne described it as "rampant", while Roland Pym and Andrew Cavendish, 11th Duke of Devonshire claimed not to recall any. The 1930s were a difficult period for Ludgrove and the school struggled to remain solvent. Apart from the effects of the Great Depression, the previous two decades had seen a declining birth rate, which now led prep schools to compete for fewer potential pupils at a time when parents were already trying to save money. During this period many schools either closed or amalgamated. Meanwhile, the location of Ludgrove School could no longer be described as rural due to the ongoing spread of London. Not wishing to be a "suburban establishment", headmaster Frank Henley purchased the site of Wixenford School, a fast declining institution which then closed. Henley immediately retired after the move was completed, and the leadership passed to Alan Barber and Tim Shaw.

=== 1937–1973 ===
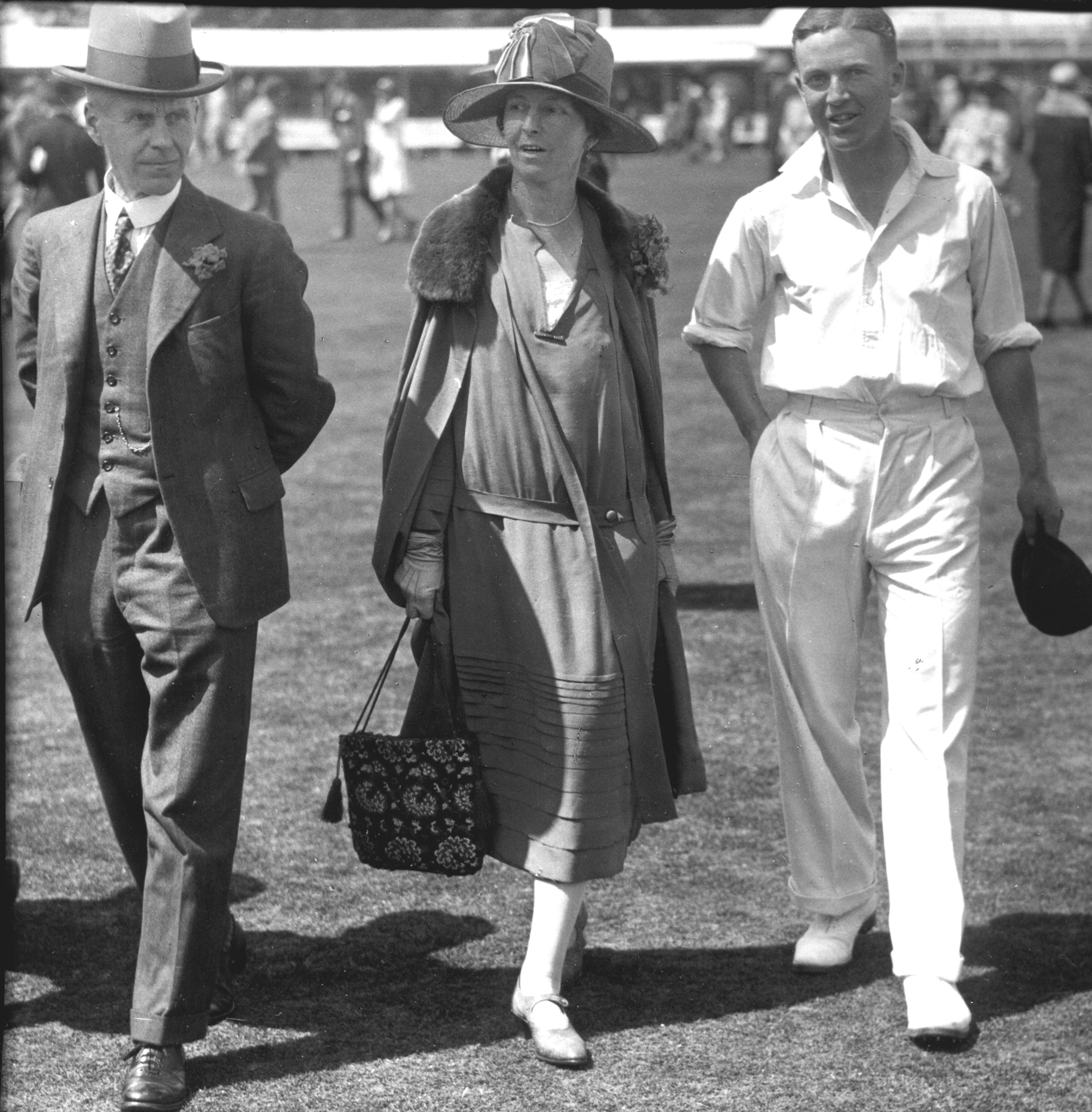
Alan Barber (right)

With the outbreak of war, Ludgrove nearly relocated to McGill University in Canada, but this was abandoned at the last minute due to transport and finance problems. Instead, Ludgrove stayed put and school life was relatively untouched, bar an unsurprising shortage of teachers and a restricted menu. Under the Barber-Shaw regime there was a strong emphasis on the games field and the winning of scholarships was never a central aim, though boys reliably passed Common Entrance, with most entering Eton. Corporal punishment was present, but discipline "not invariably enforced" by the cane.

Although Ludgrove had never refused entry to any boy whose parents could pay their way, an "aura of wealth and privilege" surrounded the school during the middle decades of the 20th century. This image of Ludgrove as a fashionable school had taken root from its earliest days, with many titled families sending their sons, who would grow up to send their sons in turn. Of the boys at the school in 1900, no fewer than ten had descendants there in 2003.

In 1968 Shaw retired, leaving Barber in charge, who stepped down himself in 1973; his son Gerald and Nichol Marston succeeding him.

=== 1973–2004 ===
By the start of the 1973–1974 academic year there was a record number of boys in the school, 128 in total, yet a sense of decline was apparent. Buildings were decaying, facilities were increasingly regarded as outdated and the school was in deficit, with many accounts overdue or unpaid. The "forward order book" of future entrants was also noticeably thinner than earlier years. On top of these issues, Eton and other public schools were growing critical of Ludgrove over its modest academic achievements. In response, Barber and Marston had the structure of the school repaired and began placing greater emphasis on academic performance. While sport continued to play a part in the culture of the school, the "centre of gravity" shifted from field to classroom. It was no longer taken for granted that boys would pass into their preferred school, and more was asked of both staff and students.

Pastoral life also changed and there was a stronger focus on providing a happy environment for pupils, as opposed to a spartan, "stiff upper lip" environment. In the mid-70s corporal punishment was abruptly abandoned when Gerald Barber misplaced his cane and decided from then on he would not continue to enforce it. The profile of the school was raised further with the enrolling of Prince William in 1990 and Prince Harry in 1992, which resulted in the presence of personal protection officers operating discreetly on site.

=== Contemporary ===
In July 2004, Marston retired. In 2008, Gerald Barber followed him and the new leadership was another partnership, this time composed of Sid Inglis and Barber's son Simon. In July 2013, Inglis left the school to take up a headship at Elstree School, leaving Simon Barber in sole charge.

== Profile ==
Class sizes are small, with an average of 12. It is one of only a few single-sex boarding-only prep schools that remain in England — most competitors in Berkshire are primarily geared towards day pupils. Admission is determined on a "first come first served basis" and it is possible to put a boy down for entry immediately after birth. Ludgrove is accredited by the Royal National Children's SpringBoard Foundation, and as of 2021, 6 per cent of boys were on means-tested bursaries ranging up to 100 per cent of fees. Cricket is regarded as the biggest sport, although football is also very popular. Most staff live on-site.

Occupying 130 acres of grounds, Ludgrove is one of the last remaining prep schools in England to provide full fortnightly boarding. With its extensive sports facilities, which feature a nine-hole golf course, swimming pool, tennis courts, and 11 pitches, school life is reportedly predicated on a link between sporting activity and positive academic performance. Most leavers depart for either Eton, Harrow, Radley, or Winchester. Alumni, known as Old Ludgrovians, include among others, the Prince of Wales, the Duke of Sussex, British politician and Prime Minister Alec Douglas-Home, historian Alistair Horne, investigative journalist Paul Foot, and adventurer Bear Grylls.

Facilities include an all-weather AstroTurf pitch; nine-hole golf course, hard tennis courts, 20-metre indoor pool, squash courts, and Eton fives courts. In June 2021 the school welcomed back former pupil Bear Grylls to officially open the new £2.5m Exploration Centre.

== Former pupils ==
- Derick Heathcoat-Amory, 1st Viscount Amory
- Alec Douglas-Home
- Humphrey Gibbs
- Bear Grylls
- Prince Edward, Duke of Kent
- Oliver Leese
- Shane Leslie
- Robert R. McCormick
- Simon Sebag-Montefiore
- Robin Shaw
- Osbert Sitwell
- David Tredinnick
- The Prince of Wales
- Charles Wellesley, 9th Duke of Wellington
- Jamie Blackett

== Notable masters ==
- Alan Barber (1905–1985), Yorkshire cricket captain, headmaster
- Arthur Dunn (1861–1902), founder of the school
- William Oakley (1873–1934), England football captain, joint headmaster
- Cecil Sharp (1859–1924), founding father of the English folk music revival, part-time music master 1893–1910
- G. O. Smith (1872–1943), England football captain and centre-forward, joint headmaster
- Robin Milford (1903–1959), composer, part-time music master
