= List of Australian films of the 1970s =

This is a list of Australian films of the 1970s. For a complete alphabetical list, see Category:Australian films.

== 1970 ==
- List of Australian films of 1970

== 1971 ==
- List of Australian films of 1971

== 1972 ==
- List of Australian films of 1972

== 1973 ==
- List of Australian films of 1973

== 1974 ==
- List of Australian films of 1974

== 1975 ==
- List of Australian films of 1975

== 1976 ==
- List of Australian films of 1976

== 1977 ==
- List of Australian films of 1977

== 1978 ==
- List of Australian films of 1978

== 1979 ==
- List of Australian films of 1979
