= List of Australian films of the 1980s =

This is a chronological list of Australian films by decade and year for years 1980s. For a complete alphabetical list, see Category:Australian films.

A list of films produced in Australia by year during the 1980s, in the List of Australian films.

== 1980 ==
- List of Australian films of 1980

== 1981 ==
- List of Australian films of 1981

== 1982 ==
- List of Australian films of 1982

== 1983 ==
- List of Australian films of 1983

== 1984 ==
- List of Australian films of 1984

== 1985 ==
- List of Australian films of 1985

== 1986 ==
- List of Australian films of 1986

== 1987 ==
- List of Australian films of 1987

== 1988 ==
- List of Australian films of 1988

== 1989 ==
- List of Australian films of 1989
