= Roadgames =

1981 Australian film

- Original Australian one-sheet
- Directed by: Richard Franklin
- Screenplay by: Everett De Roche
- Story by: Everett De Roche; Richard Franklin
- Produced by: Richard Franklin
- Starring: Stacy Keach; Jamie Lee Curtis; Marion Edward
- Cinematography: Vincent Monton
- Edited by: Edward McQueen-Mason
- Music by: Brian May
- Production companies: Essaness Pictures; Australian Film Commission; Victorian Film Corporation; Western Australian Film Council; GUO Film Distributors; Quest Films
- Distributed by: GUO Film Distributors
- Release dates: 27 February 1981 (United States); 3 July 1981 (Australia)
- Running time: 101 minutes
- Country: Australia
- Language: English
- Budget: A$1.75 million
- Box office: A$100,000

Roadgames (stylised as Road Games) is a 1981 Australian thriller film directed by Richard Franklin and starring Stacy Keach and Jamie Lee Curtis. It follows an American truck driver travelling across Australia who, with the help of a hitchhiker, seeks to track down a serial killer who is butchering women and dumping their dismembered bodies along desolate highways.

== Plot ==
In rural Australia, expatriate American truck driver Patrick Quid pulls into a motel for the night. There, a man in a green van checks in with a female hitchhiker, whom Quid had passed by because of trucking company policy. In their motel room, the hitchhiker strums a guitar while the man unpacks a new guitar string and forms it into a noose. He winds the string around his gloved hands and uses it to garrote the woman.

Quid wakes the next morning in his truck. His pet dingo sniffs at the garbage outside the motel, and Quid notices the van driver watching from the room's window as the garbage truck picks up the bags. Quid loads the refrigerated trailer with pork carcases, setting off for Perth on the Eyre Highway. On the road he passes a nagging wife and her family and a cautious man hauling a sailboat. He repeatedly passes a female hitchhiker, Pamela Rushworth, whom he does not pick up.

The wife, Frita, creates a roadblock by streaming toilet paper across the highway. Quid stops and she climbs into his cab and orders Quid to catch up with her husband, who left her at the side of the road. They play 20 Questions to pass the time. Frita mentions a woman's murder, and his nonchalant answers disturb her. She suspects he might be the serial killer from the news.

Quid stops the truck after seeing the green van parked along the road. Its driver has trash bags and an esky (cooler); he appears to be burying the bags. When the van driver notices Quid watching him through binoculars, he abandons his work and drives away. Later, at a roadhouse, the van driver assaults Quid's dingo, who Quid rescues. Quid gives chase but is hindered by the slow-driving boat owner, who refuses to let him pass. Eventually, Quid smashes the boat that swings to block as he passes, but the van is too far off to catch.

Quid picks up the repeatedly encountered hitchhiker, Pamela Rushworth, the daughter of an American diplomat. Quid urges Pamela to let her father know she is alright. At a service station, they notice the van parked near the restroom. Seeing that someone is in the toilet stall, Quid thinks he has the killer cornered and leaves Pamela to investigate the van. While reaching for the esky inside the van, Pamela encounters the driver, sleeping on the floor. In the restroom, a biker emerges from the stall. Quid rushes outside to see the van is gone.

When Quid catches up to the van, he believes Pamela is chatting happily in the passenger seat. Later that night, Quid notices the van parked off the side of the road and pulls over to investigate. He hears a man and a woman giggling in the bushes nearby and mistakenly assumes that Pamela and the van driver are having sex. He breaks into the van and finds that the esky only contains food.

Arriving at the outskirts of Perth, Quid reports to the weigh station and spots the van. He follows it through the streets of Perth, trailed by the police. Eventually the van reaches a dead end and Quid's truck becomes stuck in the narrow alleys. The van driver approaches Quid's truck and attempts to strangle him with a garrotte, but Quid disarms him. When Quid starts to strangle the van driver with the garrotte, the police arrive and assume Quid is the killer. Upon freeing a gagged and bound Pamela from the van, the police realise Quid is innocent and catch Pamela's captor while he is trying to escape through the crowd. Pamela scolds Quid for abandoning her, necessitating her appeasement of the dangerous van driver who caught her searching his van.

After delivering the meat shipment, Quid relates to Pamela that after he found his trailer door open and discovered the load weight some kilos over, he had presumed the van driver had killed her and disposed of her inside his trailer. At the meat facility, a woman cleaning out the trailer is brushed by a guitar string hanging from the ceiling. When she tugs at it, a human head falls into her soap bucket.

== Cast ==
- Stacy Keach as Pat Quid
- Jamie Lee Curtis as Hitch (Pamela Rushworth)
- Marion Edward as Frita
- Grant Page as Smith or Jones
- Alan Hopgood as Lester
- "Killer" as the dingo "Boswell"

== Production ==
=== Development ===
While making the film Patrick, Richard Franklin gave Everett De Roche a copy of Rear Window as an example of how he wanted the script typed. De Roche loved the content of the script and expressed his desire to write a film with a similar plot but set on a moving vehicle. He developed the idea with Franklin in Fiji, where the latter was co-producing The Blue Lagoon (1980). De Roche wrote the first draft of Roadgames over a period of 8 days in a hotel, with Franklin visiting periodically during breaks in the production of Blue Lagoon.

De Roche had written an episode of the TV series Truckies (1978) called "Road Games". Its truckie characters became concerned about a strange man following two small children on a bus. It aired on 4 September 1978 and was directed by Michael Ludbrook.

=== Casting ===
Franklin wanted to cast Sean Connery in the lead, but was unable to afford his salary, and the role went to Stacy Keach instead.

Australian actress Lisa Peers was cast to play opposite him, but the US distributors insisted on an American co-star, so Franklin cast Jamie Lee Curtis. The film ran into trouble with Actors Equity when the Melbourne branch of the union approved the importation of Curtis, but the Sydney branch opposed it. "We found ourselves as the ping-pong ball in a game of politics between Melbourne and Sydney, and it nearly resulted in the film closing down," said Franklin. Franklin later acknowledged wishing he had increased the size of Curtis' part to take more advantage of her.

=== Filming ===
Shot on location in the Nullarbor Plain and in Melbourne, the budget of $1.75 million was the highest ever for an Australian film at that time.

== Release ==
Avco Embassy Pictures paid $500,000 for all distribution rights outside Australia, and the balance came from the Greater Union, the Australian Film Commission, the Victorian Film Corporation, and the Western Australian Film Council. Avco Embassy released the film in the United States on 27 February 1981, screening it in smaller markets in Arizona and California.

The film had its Australian release in Melbourne on 3 July 1981.

=== Home media ===
The film was first released on VHS in Australia by Star Video in the early 1980s. In the US, the first VHS release was handled by Embassy Home Entertainment and later in the 1990s by Nelson Entertainment. Roadgames was first released on DVD in the United States on 10 June 2003 by Anchor Bay Entertainment, this release has long gone out of print with copies running at $85 on Amazon.com. In Australia, Umbrella Entertainment released a special edition DVD in 2004 – this DVD is also no-longer in print. In April 2016, it was announced that Umbrella would release a new 4k restoration of the film for the first time on Blu-ray disc. Scream Factory released it on Blu-ray in a special edition form on 12 November 2019. A 4K Ultra HD Blu-ray release was announced by Kino Lorber on 11 August 2024.

== Reception ==
=== Box office ===
Roadgames was a box office bomb in Australia upon its 1981 release. It was released theatrically in the United States in November 1981, and similarly did not perform as well as originally expected, which Franklin blamed on its marketing as a slasher film. However, it did lead to Franklin landing the job of directing Psycho II in 1983.

=== Critical response ===
On Rotten Tomatoes, the film has an approval rating of 92% based on 12 reviews, with an average rating of 7.90/10. On Metacritic the film has a score of 71 out of 100, based on 6 critics, indicating "generally favorable reviews". Variety gave the film a positive review, calling it "an above-average suspenser." The New York Times, however, gave the film a middling review, saying: "Although Road Games was made in Australia, the Outback might as well be the New Jersey Turnpike." Time Out gave the film a positive review, saying: "It's precisely its pretensions which make this a surprisingly agreeable cross of angst-ridden '70s road movie with Hitchcockian thriller... Effective as a string of cinematic shocks, the movie manages a good number of coups, with its cargo of raw meat, use of Jamie Lee's association with endless knife-flicks, and the ever-so-slightly surreal placing of figures in a vast landscape, making for an endearing horror pic." Leonard Maltin described it as an "adequate thriller" and rated the film 21/2-stars-out-of-4.

=== Accolades ===
Award/association	Year	Category	Recipient(s) and nominee(s)	Result	Ref.
AACTA Awards (1981 AFI Awards)	Best Supporting Actress	Marion Edward	Nominated		
AACTA Awards (1981 AFI Awards)	Best Cinematography	Vincent Monton	Nominated		
AACTA Awards (1981 AFI Awards)	Best Editing	Edward McQueen-Mason	Nominated		
AACTA Awards (1981 AFI Awards)	Best Original Music Score	Brian May	Nominated		
Saturn Awards	1982	Best International Film		Nominated	
Saturn Awards	2004	Best DVD Classic Film Release		Nominated	

=== Legacy ===
The film has been cited by Quentin Tarantino as one of his favourite films, and also served as influence in Australian director Greg McLean's debut feature, Wolf Creek (2005).

== See also ==
- Cinema of Australia

== Sources ==
- Stratton, David (1990). The Avocado Plantation: Boom and Bust in the Australian Film Industry. Pan MacMillan. ISBN 978-0-73290-250-6.
