= Antony I. Ginnane =

Australian film producer

Antony I. "Tony" Ginnane is an Australian film producer, best known for his work in the exploitation genre. He was head of the Screen Producers Association of Australia from 2008 to 2011.

== Early life and education ==
Antony I. Ginnane, known as Tony Ginnane, studied law at Melbourne University where he was involved in the Film Society, and published a film magazine, Film Chronicle. He wrote, produced, and directed a low-budget feature, Sympathy in Summer (1971), during this time.

== Filmmaking career ==
Ginnane has been described as "Australia's Roger Corman", or Australia's equivalent to Robert Lippert.

In 1970 he established a small distribution company, Studio Films, in Melbourne which imported several art house and exploitation films, and began attending Cannes Film Festival regularly. Among the films he distributed in Australia were Wind from the East and The Vampire Happening.

=== Producing ===
==== Australia ====
In the mid 1970s Ginnane decided to enter the production field. He attempted to set up a Roger Corman-type "nurses" film which he would produce and direct, and then a crime drama set against the background of the massage parlour business called Sexy Little Me, but was unable to find the money. However he could raise $50,000 for a sex film. For director he hired Richard Franklin, with whom Ginnane had worked with on the overseas marketing for The True Story of Eskimo Nell; Ross Dimsey wrote the script. The result, Fantasm (1976) was shot mostly in the US with a number of American actors with experience in pornographic films.

Fantasm was very profitable, and led to a sequel, Fantasm Comes Again (1977), directed by Colin Eggleston; it did less well at the box office. Ginnane also moved into family films with Blue Fire Lady (1977), directed by Ross Dimsey and starring Cathryn Harrison.

Ginnane went into thrillers with Patrick (1978), directed by Franklin from a script by Everett De Roche, starring an imported Susan Penhaligon. It was not that popular at the Australian box office but sold extremely well internationally.

Ginnane stayed in the thriller genre with Snapshot (1979), written by de Roche, the first feature directed by Simon Wincer and first leading role for Sigrid Thornton. He went into vampire films with Thirst (1979), the directorial debut of Rod Hardy, and featuring an imported Henry Silva and David Hemmings in the cast.

Ginnane was reunited with de Roche and Winder on Harlequin (1980) a modern-day retelling of the Rasputin story featuring Robert Powell, Hemmings, and Broderick Crawford. The film was seemingly designed so as to appear it was not shot in Australian, which, along with the three imported actors, led to Ginnane receiving much criticism, especially as the film was partly financed with money from the Australian tax payer. The movie was very successful internationally.

Ginnane imported three foreign actors, Powell, Jenny Agutter and Joseph Cotten, for The Survivor (1981), directed by Hemmings, which was a commercial disappointment.

==== New Zealand ====
Ginnane wanted to make his next film, The Race for the Yankee Zephyr (1981), written by De Roche, with foreign leads. Australia's Actors Equity objected, so Ginnane decided to make it in New Zealand. It was directed by Hemmings and starred George Peppard, Ken Wahl, Donald Pleasence and Lesley Ann Downe. The Hemdale Film Corporation helped finance.

Ginnane stayed in New Zealand to make Strange Behavior (1982), directed by Michael Laughlin and co-written by Bill Condon, with American leads Michael Murphy and Louise Fletcher; Hemdale co financed this one too. He also made Prisoners (1981) with Tatum O'Neal.

Ginnane returned to Australia to produce Turkey Shoot (1982) directed by Brian Trenchard-Smith with Steve Railsback and Olivia Hussey. He went back to New Zealand to make Second Time Lucky (1984); Mesmerized (1985) from director Laughlin with Jodie Foster and John Lithgow. In Australia he produced the mini series Great Expectations: The Untold Story (1987).

==== Other countries ====
In the late 1980s Ginnane started making movies in the Philippines, including Killer Instinct (1987); Whiteforce (1988); Savage Justice (1988); The Siege of Firebase Gloria (1989), directed by Trenchard-Smith; A Case of Honor (1990), directed by Eddie Romero; Driving Force (1990) and Demonstone (1990), both directed by Andrew Prowse.

Ginnane relocated to Canada, where his films included No Contest (1995) starring Andrew Dice Clay; Screamers (1995), one of his most highly regarded films; Men with Guns (1997); Captive (1998); The Truth About Juliet (1998); Reluctant Angel (1998); Black Light (1998); Reaper (2000), Sweet Revenge (2001), and The Risen (2005).

In New Zealand he made Bonjour Timothy (1995), The Whole of the Moon (1997) and Lawless: Beyond Justice (2001), and Lawless: Dead Evidence (2001).

Back in Australia he made a children's film Sally Marshall Is Not an Alien (1998) directed by Mario Andreacchio, with Canadian money.

He helped finance a documentary about Broken Hill, The Big Red, released in 2005.

Blind Heat (2000) was a US-Mexican co production and The Hit (2001) was made in Lithuania, directed by Vincent Monton.

Ginnane helped finance a series of ultra-low-budget features, including Look @ Me (2005); Ten Dead Men (2006), shot in the UK.

==== Later credits ====
Ginnane's later credits include Screamers: The Hunting (2009); Arctic Blast (2010), shot in Australia, and directed by Trenchard-Smith; Surviving Georgia (2011); Metal Tornado (2011); and Last Dance (2012), in Australia.

He produced two remakes of his earlier films, Patrick (2013), directed by Mark Hartley, and Turkey Shoot (2014). He helped produce the TV series Pulse (2017) and the film Bad Blood (2017).

=== Executive producer ===
In the late 1980s Ginnane worked mostly as an executive producer, being more involved in raising finance than organising physical production.

In 1987 his company, International Film Management Limited, combined with Hemdale to produce a number of movies to form a joint venture Hemdale Ginnane Australia. Hemdale later encountered a series of financial difficulties as did Goldfarb, another company with which Ginnane was associated.

Ginnane's credits include Dark Age (1987), a killer crocodile film that was a co-production with RKO which was never released theatrically; High Tide (1987) directed by Gillian Armstrong; Slate, Wyn & Me (1987); The Tale of Ruby Rose (1987), shot in Tasmania; The Lighthorsemen (1987), a $10 million World War One epic about the Battle of Beersheba directed by Wincer; The Time Guardian (1987), a science fiction epic starring Tom Burlinson that was a financial disaster; Initiation (1987), a horror film; Incident at Raven's Gate (1988), directed by Rolf de Heer; The Everlasting Secret Family (1988) directed by Michael Thornhill; The Dreaming (1988), directed by Mario Andreacchio; Grievous Bodily Harm (1988), directed by Mark Joffe; Boundaries of the Heart (1988); Mull (1989) directed by McLennan, which won awards; Minnamurra (1989); and Fatal Sky (1990). He made another mini series Emma: Queen of the South Seas (1988).

== Other activities ==
Ginnane was head of the Screen Producers Association of Australia from 2008 to 2011. He was credited with promoting their Producer Distributor Film Fund, which provided a funding base for films with a budget of A$7–30 million dollars.

== CD ==
A CD of themes from 14 of his films was produced in 2008 by Philip Powers and released by 1M1 Records, titled The Antony I. Ginnane Collection: Classic Australian Film Scores of the 70s and 80s.

== Selected filmography ==
- Sympathy in Summer (1971) - director, writer
- Fantasm (1976) - producer, writer
- Fantasm Comes Again (1977) - producer, actor
- Blue Fire Lady (1977) - producer
- Patrick (1978) - producer
- Snapshot (1979) - producer
- Thirst (1979) - producer
- Harlequin (1980) - producer
- The Survivor (1981) - producer
- Strange Behavior (1981) - producer
- Race for the Yankee Zephyr (1981) - producer
- Turkey Shoot (1982) - producer
- Prisoners (1982, unreleased) - producer
- Second Time Lucky (1984) - producer
- Mesmerised (1985) - producer
- Great Expectations: The Untold Story (1986) (mini series) - producer
- Dark Age (1987) - executive producer
- The Lighthorsemen (1987) - executive producer
- The Time Guardian (1987) - executive producer
- Incident at Raven's Gate (1988) - executive producer
- Grievous Bodily Harm (1988) - executive producer
- Mull (1989) - executive producer
- Minnamurra (1989) - producer
- The Siege of Firebase Gloria (1989) - executive producer
- Fatal Sky (1990) - producer
- Screamers (1995) - supervising producer
- Sally Marshall Is Not an Alien (1999) - executive producer
- Ten Dead Men (2008) - executive producer
- Arctic Blast (2010) - producer
- Metal Tornado (2011) (TV movie) - producer
- Last Dance (2012) - producer
- Patrick (2013) - producer
- Turkey Shoot (2014) - producer, actor
- Pulse (2017) - producer
- Bad Blood (2017) - producer
- Never Too Late (2020) - producer
- Girl at the Window (2022) - producer
- Stonerunner (TBA) - producer
