= Rainbeaux Smith =

American actress

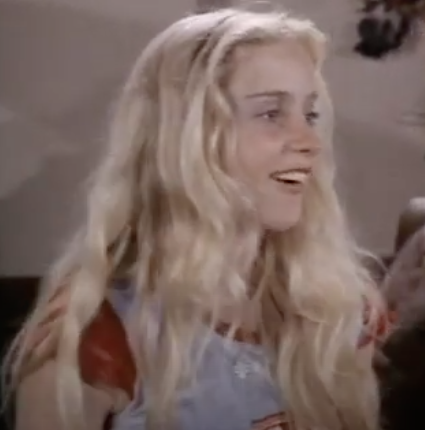
- Smith in Revenge of the Cheerleaders (1976)
- Born: Cheryl Lynn Smith; June 6, 1955; Los Angeles, California, U.S.
- Died: October 25, 2002 (aged 47); Los Angeles, California, U.S.
- Other names: Cheryl Rainbeaux; Cheryl RX Smith; Cheryl Rainbeaux Smith; Rainbeaux Smith
- Occupations: Actress; musician
- Years active: 1971–1983
- Agent: David-Rifkin Agency

Cheryl Lynn "Rainbeaux" Smith (June 6, 1955 – October 25, 2002) was an American actress and musician who appeared in a number of mainstream features, as well as exploitation and horror films throughout the 1970s and 1980s. Many of these films have become cult classics.

== Early life ==
Cheryl Lynn Smith was born on June 6, 1955 in Los Angeles to Ronald (Ron) V. Smith (1912–2005) and Jayne Bradley Willhite Smith (1916–1994). Smith's father was a brick mason, and her mother performed in vaudeville as a dancer on the Orpheum circuit and later taught ballet. After the divorce of her parents in 1964, Smith and her mother moved to a home located one block south of the Sunset Strip in Hollywood. Smith attended Bancroft Junior High School and Fairfax High School, with classmates Danny Sugerman and Brett Smiley. Smith's best friend in her early teens was Susan Snyder, whom she nicknamed "Snot" and who married Robert Carradine.

She quit school in order to pursue her dream of acting in films. Her first love was Ethan Margalith; they lived together during 1972 and 1973, and he went on to found Starving Students Moving Company with Darryl Marshak, who later represented Leonardo DiCaprio.

== Career ==
Smith's first film appearance was in avant-garde filmmaker Leland Auslander's short The Birth of Aphrodite (1971), after a friend of her mother suggested her for the role. The Birth of Aphrodite won the Silver Phoenix for Best Experimental Film award at the 1971 Atlanta International Film Festival, the CINE Golden Eagle, and was screened in competition for the Short Film Palme d'Or award at the 1972 Cannes Film Festival. Jay Lovins later included The Birth of Aphrodite in an anthology of noteworthy short films that were screened at various film festivals titled Threshold 9 Illusions (1972). In 1973, Smith made her starring debut as the lead in Richard Blackburn's cult-horror film Lemora.

In 1974, four films were released featuring Smith, three of which are now considered cult classics: Caged Heat (featuring the directorial debut of Jonathan Demme); Video Vixens; Brian DePalma's Phantom of the Paradise; and The Swinging Cheerleaders (directed by exploitation filmmaker Jack Hill). Smith was in the early stages of pregnancy while shooting The Swinging Cheerleaders, and in September 1974, she gave birth to her son Justin Sterling (fashion model, musician, and DJ), whose father is rock and jazz guitarist John Sterling.

Smith returned to the screen in 1975 with a supporting role in the film adaptation of Raymond Chandler's novel Farewell, My Lovely, starring Robert Mitchum as Phillip Marlowe, in which Smith was shown in a violent bedroom scene opposite a then near-unknown Sylvester Stallone. The year of 1976 saw the release of six films where she had minor or supporting roles. One of those films, Richard Lerner's Revenge of the Cheerleaders had been shot in 1974 when Smith was eight months pregnant. Also included in her 1976 releases are the blaxpoitation classic Drum, Rene Daalder's cult classic Massacre at Central High, and Slumber Party '57.

In 1977, Smith was featured in a mixture of low budget B movies such as The Incredible Melting Man (which also featured director Jonathan Demme in a rare acting role) and Robert Aldrich's adaptation of The Choirboys. She also played the titular character in Michael Pataki's Cinderella (1977), with co-star and childhood friend Brett Smiley. Cinderella was produced by Charles Band (founder of Full Moon Features), and this film marked the first of three collaborations between Smith and Band. Also in 1977, Australian exploitation filmmakers Anthony Ginnane and Ross Dimsey (who had worked with Smith on the Ozploitation movie Fantasm Comes Again) announced that she would star in their upcoming film Body Count, an adaptation of the novel Reservation Cowboys, but the film never was made.

1978 was a transitional year for Smith, as she balanced acting with a music career. In the late 1970s, Smith began a career in music as a drummer, vocalist, and songwriter, and she fronted the all-girl rock group named L.A. Girls. While shooting John Byrum's film Heart Beat (1980)—based on Carolyn Cassady's autobiography—in San Francisco, she was asked to join the Runaways after Sandy West and Lita Ford quit the group while the film We're All Crazy Now was in pre-production. An impromptu group was created on the spot, casting Smith through her counsel Stann Findelle and Runaways manager Toby Mamis. The group was fronted by Joan Jett, with Smith on the drums as "Sandy".

We're All Crazy Now was a failed production, with only a few musical numbers and scenes being shot before the production was halted due to Jett's health issues. These completed scenes were edited into the 1984 movie Du-Beat-E-O. Smith briefly continued playing drums for Jett after the Runaways' break-up and provided backing vocals for Jett's first solo album. 1978 also marked Smith's appearances in Charles Band's cult classic Laserblast and Cheech and Chong's box-office hit Up in Smoke, the latter directed by Lou Adler, record producer and co-owner of the Roxy Theatre.

In 1980, Smith returned to acting full-time while continuing to work in the music industry. She was among the performers who collaborated with record producer Jack Nitzsche on the original soundtrack for the William Friedkin film Cruising (1980). She also played drums in Phil Lee's band, and at that time, they were romantically involved. Her final two years acting in films included working for Demme in his Academy Award-winning film Melvin and Howard (1980) and with Cheech and Chong in their 1981 film Cheech and Chong's Nice Dreams. She also worked for the third and final time with Band in 1982's Parasite, which was shot in 3-D. Smith also was in Dead Men Don't Wear Plaid (1982), portraying Veronica Lake in a non-speaking role.

Smith contributed a spoken-word performance of her song "Sure" for producer and writer Harvey Kubernik's Voices of the Angels, a 1982 album of spoken word performances, which also featured writers Charles Bukowski and Danny Sugerman as well as musicians Karri Khrome and Chuck Dukowski. Due to substance-abuse problems, Smith left the film industry after shooting Independence Day (1983) and supported herself with work as a freelance graphic artist during the 1980s. Smith also had a modeling career and sat for photographers Ron Raffaelli and Jan Eric Deen as well as for numerous commercial fashion photographers located in Los Angeles during the 1970s and 1980s.

== Death ==
Smith died on October 25, 2002, due to complications from liver disease and hepatitis after suffering from Opioid Use Disorder (OUD) for two decades.

== Discography ==
Artist	Album	Year of release	Notes
Joan Jett	Bad Reputation	1980	backing vocals, credited as "Rainbow Smith"
Various artists	Cruising original soundtrack	1980	drums on "When I Close My Eyes I See Blood" by Madelynn Von Ritz
Various artists	Voices of the Angels	1982	"Sure", written by Smith
Various artists	The Sound of Hollywood Girls	1983	
Various artists	The Sound of Hollywood: du BEAT-e-o	1985	
Joan Jett	The First Sessions	2015	backing vocals

== Filmography ==
Year	Title	Role	Notes
1971	Evel Knievel	Girl Buying Ticket At Rodeo	uncredited
1971	The Birth of Aphrodite	Aphrodite	credited as Cheryl Smith
1973	Lemora	Lila Lee	
1974	Caged Heat	Lavelle	
1974	The Swinging Cheerleaders	Andrea	
1974	Video Vixens	'Twinkle Twat' Girl	alternative title: Black Socks
1974	Phantom of the Paradise	Groupie	
1975	Farewell, My Lovely	Doris	
1976	The Pom Pom Girls	Roxanne	alternative title: Palisades High
1976	Revenge of the Cheerleaders	Heather	alternative title: Caught with Their Pants Down
1976	Drum	Sophie Maxwell	
1976	Massacre at Central High	Mary	alternative title: Blackboard Massacre
1976	Slumber Party '57	Sherry	alternative title: Teenage Slumber Party
1976	Logan's Run	Screamer Party Girl (uncredited)	
1976	The Quest	Blonde Girl	episode 14: "The Seminole Negro Indian Scouts"
1977	Cinderella	Cinderella	alternative title: The Other Cinderella
1977	Boogievision	Naked Hippie Girl On Motorcycle	uncredited
1977	Game Show Models	Model In Yellow Negligee	uncredited
1977	The Incredible Melting Man	The Model	
1977	The Choirboys	Tammy	
1977	Fantasm Comes Again	Carol	segment: "Double Feature"
1978	The Driver	Fingers' Girlfriend	Scenes deleted
1978	Laserblast	Kathy Farley	
1978	Up in Smoke	Laughing Lady	
1979	We're All Crazy Now	Runaways Drummer Sandy West (Rainbeaux)	
1980	Melvin and Howard	Patient Ronnie	
1981	The Choice	Chris	television movie
1981	Nice Dreams	Blondie Group #1	credited as Cheryl RX Smith
1982	Hart to Hart	Woman	episode: "Harts Under Glass"
1982	Vice Squad	White Prostitute	
1982	Parasite	Captive Girl	
1982	Dead Men Don't Wear Plaid	Veronica Lake	uncredited
1983	Independence Day	Ginny	
1984	Du-Beat-E-O	Sandy	originally filmed in 1979 as We're All Crazy Now but never finished
