= Blue Fire Lady =

- Directed by: Ross Dimsey
- Written by: Bob Maumill
- Produced by: Antony I. Ginnane
- Starring: Cathryn Harrison; Mark Holden
- Cinematography: Vince Monton
- Music by: Mike Brady
- Production companies: Filmways Australasian Distributors; Australian International Film Corporation
- Distributed by: Filmways Australasian Distributors
- Release date: 9 December 1977
- Running time: 96 mins
- Country: Australia
- Language: English
- Budget: $231,000

Blue Fire Lady is a 1977 Australian film directed by Ross Dimsey and starring Cathryn Harrison and Mark Holden. It was a rare children's film from producer Antony I. Ginnane who was better known for his horror and sex films.

== Plot ==
Jenny Grey is a young girl who wants to be a competitive show rider but her father, Alan, doesn't approve, because his wife was killed in a riding accident. Jenny rides when she can and helps her neighbours deliver a foal. Alan sends Jenny to boarding school in Melbourne to forget the idea but she rides whenever she can.

When Jenny turns 18 she gets a job as a stable hand with the trainer Mr McIntyre at Caulfield racetrack, and takes a room in a boarding house run by the caring Mrs Gianini, who also rents a room to Barry, a university student and mechanic. Jenny loves her job but frowns on Mr McIntyre's seemingly uncaring treatment of his horses. He works and races a horse with a sore leg, and sends the old stable dog to be put down. Jenny adopts the dog, whom Mrs G nicknames "Mr Dog". A new horse arrives at the stables, a chestnut filly with a big blaze. The filly is the foal Jenny had helped birth and has been given the name Blue Fire Lady. Lady is vicious toward the other stablehands but loves Jenny, who kindly begins to train her for the races as her rider and strapper. Meanwhile, she develops a romance with Barry, her house-mate.

Blue Fire Lady's first race is a disaster for Jenny. She asked the jockey to treat the horse kindly, but Mr. McIntyre, who doesn't believe the filly has any potential, instructs him to whip her hard. Although Blue Fire Lady wins, she is traumatised and injured after the race. Jenny quits her job and later learns from a former stable colleague that Lady is too difficult to handle and will be sent to auction. Unbeknownst to Jenny, Barry drives out to see her estranged father and begs him to understand how much Jenny loves horses.

Jenny attempts to bid $100 at the auction but is outbid by a man from a knackery who wants horses for dog food. Jenny is heartbroken and cries by the stables. Barry finds her and comforts her, urging her to come outside. Confused, Jenny follows him, to see her father handing a check to the slaughter-man and Lady being loaded into a horse trailer. Her father smiles and hugs Jenny close, telling her he has bought Lady for her and he is sorry for not recognising her passion is for horses.

The film ends with a scene of Jenny and Blue Fire Lady competing in a show-jumping round, with her proud father and Barry watching on as she wins and accepts her trophy.

== Cast ==
- Cathryn Harrison as Jenny
- Mark Holden as Barry
- Peter Cummins as McIntyre
- Marion Edward as Mrs Gianini
- Lloyd Cunnington as Mr Grey
- Irene Hewitt as Mrs Bartlett
- Syd Conabere as Mr Bartlett
- Philip Barnard-Brown as Stephen
- Gary Waddell as Charlie
- John Wood as Gus
- John Ewart as Mr Peters
- Rollo Roylance as Reporter
- John Murphy as Vet
- Telford Jackson as Chief Stewart
- Roy Higgins as Kelvin Clegg
- Bill Collins as broadcaster
- Jack Mobbs as Postman
- Lisa Aldenhoven as Office Receptionist
- Liddy Clark as Betty

== Production ==
Bob Maumill brought the script to Antony I. Ginnane who decided to make it. Ross Dimsey, who had written some sex films for Ginnane and had directed children in television commercials, was hired as director.

The film was funded entirely by private sources, coming from Filmways, the Nine network, Channel Seven in Perth and some private investors. Shooting took place in and around Melbourne over five weeks in August and September 1977 with race scene shot at Caulfied.

== Release ==
The film enjoyed a reasonably successful run at the box office. By early 1979 Ginnane said the film had earned over $100,000 in foreign sales and he expected it would be profitable in a few more months.

== See also ==
- List of films about horses
