= Fantasm Comes Again =

- Australian film poster
- Directed by: Eric Ram
- Screenplay by: Robert Derriere
- Produced by: Antony I. Ginnane
- Starring: Uschi Digard; Rick Cassidy; Rainbeaux Smith; John C. Holmes; Serena; Angela Menzies-Wills; Bill Margold
- Cinematography: Vince Monton
- Edited by: Tony Patterson
- Music by: John Mol
- Production companies: Australian International Film Corporation; First Film Finance
- Distributed by: Filmways Australasian Distributors
- Release date: 26 December 1977
- Running time: 94 minutes
- Country: Australia
- Language: English
- Budget: $85,000

Fantasm Comes Again is a 1977 Australian softcore pornographic film. It is the sequel to Fantasm (1976) and was the first feature directed by Colin Eggleston.

== Plot ==
Journalist Libbie is taking over the "Dear Collette" sex advice column at her newspaper from veteran reporter Harry, who is retiring. Over the course of one night, Harry talks Libbie through a series of letters from their readers. They include:

- rape in a drive in theatre
- teacher-student sex in a gym
- lesbian seduction in a barn
- a suburban orgy
- incest
- sex in a pool
- sex in a library
- oral sex on the road
- a threesome in an elevator
- sex between monks and a nun.

== Cast ==
Wraparound Story

- Angela Menzies-Wills as Libbie
- Clive Hearne as Harry

Silence Please

- Tom Thumb as Harold
- Liz Wolfe as Rita
- Rosemarie Bern as Cindy
- Christine De Shaffer as First Reader
- Pat Benco as Second Reader (credited as Pat Manning)
- Martin Margulies as Third Reader

Workout

- Rick Cassidy as Mr. Bates
- Michael Barton as Miss Peabody

Double Feature

- Urias S. Cambridge as Bob
- Rainbeaux Smith as Carol
- Peter Kurzon as Ted
- Lois Owens as Alice
- Mike Stapp as Rapist

Going Up?

- Suzy A. Star as Penny
- Amanda Smith as Sally
- Herb Layne as Bill
- Rhonda Willcox as First Onlooker
- Eve Darling as Second Onlooker
- Sam Menning as Third Onlooker

Straw Dolls

- Uschi Digard as Leslie
- Dee Dee Levitt as Bianca
- Dee Cooper as Jake

The Good Old Gang at the Office

- Con Covert as Mr. Clark
- Lem Lary as Mr. Davis
- Brenda Fogarty as Miss Christie
- Bryant Rigby as Tony
- Elaine Collins as Miss Ford
- Helen O'Connell as Miss Carter
- Pat Benco as First Guest (credited as Pat Manning)
- Titus Moede as Second Guest
- P.J. Jackson as "Lollipop"
- Winston as "El Che"
- Candy Fox as "Yellow Rose"

The Kiss of Life

- Bill Margold as Tony
- Suzanne Walsh as Samantha
- Linda York as Jo
- Mary Johnson as Terri
- John C. Holmes as Stud
- Titus Moede as Moody

Family Reunion

- Al Ward as Uncle Fred
- Mary Gavin as Frances (credited as Candy Samples)
- Nancy Mann as Virginia
- Kodax as "Fluffy"

Overdrive

- Jesse Adams as Sterling
- Christine De Shaffer as Carol

True Confession

- Serena as Imogene
- Michael Karnitz as Joe
- Antony I. Ginnane as "Monk"

== Production ==
The linking scenes between the two journalists were shot in Australia, and the sex scenes were filmed over 12 days in Los Angeles by an Australian director and cinematographer, using American porn stars.

The budget was larger on the sequel in an attempt to attract a bigger audience; in contrast with the original, where only one of the ten stories was lip sync and the rest in voice over, all the stories in Fantasm Comes Again had lip sync dialogue. Ginnane later thought this was a mistake as it distracted from what was on screen.

== Reception ==
The film sold well around the world but was not as popular as Fantasm at the Australian box office. Ginnane blamed the fact by the time it was released there was a glut of sex films on the market and the delay caused by censorship hold ups. (In 1980 David Stratton called it "the most censored of the new Australian films.") By 1979 the film had not yet broken even but Ginnane was confident that would be the case.

Ginnane later said that he felt Colin Eggleston was just as competent a director as Richard Franklin but thought his sense of humour was different "and perhaps it didn't suit the material as well".
