= Race for the Yankee Zephyr =

1981 New Zealand suspense-action-thriller film by David Hemmings

- Australian film poster
- Directed by: David Hemmings
- Screenplay by: Everett De Roche
- Produced by: Antony I. Ginnane; John Barnett; David Hemmings
- Starring: Ken Wahl; Lesley Ann Warren; Donald Pleasence; George Peppard; Bruno Lawrence
- Cinematography: Vincent Monton
- Edited by: John Laing
- Music by: Brian May
- Production companies: Hemdale; Pact Productions; Fay Richwhite; First City Films; Gupta Film Services; Pellinto Investments; Drake Films; Endeavour Productions; FGH
- Distributed by: GUO Film Distributors (Australia); Endeavour Productions (New Zealand); Film Ventures International (US)
- Release date: 18 December 1981
- Running time: 108 minutes (Australia); 91 minutes (US)
- Countries: Australia; New Zealand; United States
- Language: English
- Budget: $6 million

Race for the Yankee Zephyr (also known as Treasure of the Yankee Zephyr) is a 1981 action adventure film directed and produced by David Hemmings, and starring Ken Wahl, Lesley Ann Warren, Donald Pleasence and George Peppard. It is a co-production between Australian, New Zealand, and American companies. It was released on 18 December 1981.

== Plot ==
Gibbie Gibson has discovered a World War II-era plane wreck in the Southern Alps of New Zealand. When his discovery becomes known Gibson, his daughter Sally and his lodger Barney Whitaker find trouble from a group of treasure hunters led by a Mister Theo Brown, who are intent on finding the cache of money they believe is on the wreck.

== Cast ==
- Ken Wahl as Barney Whitaker; a hunter who owns a helicopter and lives with Gibbie Gibson. He is the nemesis of Theo Brown who kidnaps Gibbie and Barney eventually falls in love with Gibbie's daughter Sally Gibson.
- Lesley Ann Warren as Sally Gibson; a receptionist who is the daughter of Gibbie Gibson. She is caught up between the war between Gibbie's lodger Barney Whitaker and his rival Theo Brown, but eventually falls in love with Barney.
- Donald Pleasence as Gibbie Gibson; a hunter and the lodge host of Barney Whitaker, he finds the plane wreck in the mountains and is the father of Sally Gibson and Gibbie is eventually taken prisoner by Theo and his henchmen.
- George Peppard as Theo Brown; a gangster who is the arch rival of Barney Whitaker. He kidnaps Barney's lodge host Gibbie Gibson, bent on finding the wreck.
- Bruno Lawrence as Barker; one of Brown's henchmen.
- Grant Tilly as the Collector; a civilian and owner of a local pawn shop.
- Robert Bruce as the Bartender
- Harry Rutherford-Jones as Harry

== Production ==
The film was an original story by writer Everett De Roche, who said he got the idea from a neighbour of his in Mount Isa. It was based on a true incident about the war-time disappearance of an American DC3 military aircraft carrying the payroll for the Pacific fleet which was later discovered off Cape York. Richard Franklin was originally attached as director, and Antony I. Ginnane produced.

The script was originally set in Queensland, Australia, but the producers wanted to import four overseas actors, and Actors Equity objected. De Roche re-wrote the film so it was set in New Zealand. Richard Franklin dropped out of the film because he was unhappy with the change in location, and David Hemmings, who was attached to the film as a producer, was appointed director. Ginnane was so annoyed with Equity that he made his next four films in New Zealand.

Funding was obtained privately.

=== Jetboat accident and dedication ===
Due to the misreading of a closing credit dedication to three names who died in connection with the film and while operating jetboats, it has been wrongly assumed (e.g. on IMDb etc.) that there was a triple fatality boating accident during filming on the Kawarau River in New Zealand. However, contemporary local news reports make clear that only one boat driver, Bill Clarke, drowned during a practice run, from which another passenger, Colin Robinson, survived that capsizing. However, 6 months later that survivor died in another jetboat crash on the same river, but unrelated to the film. Another film crew member in his twenties suffered a severe asthma attack during production in an isolated mountain location, but not during a stunt.

== Release ==
The film was one of the leaders of Soviet film distribution in 1983, when it was seen by 29 million Soviet viewers.

== Home media ==
The film was released on Blu-ray by Kino Lorber on December 2018.
