= Max Phipps =

Australian actor (1939–2000)

- Born: Maxwell John Phipps; 18 November 1939; Dubbo, New South Wales, Australia
- Died: 6 August 2000 (aged 60); Sydney, New South Wales, Australia
- Occupation: Actor

Maxwell John Phipps (18 November 1939 – 6 August 2000) was an Australian actor, director and singer known for a number of roles in theatre, films and television during the 1960s until the end of the 1990s.

Phipps' most notable roles included portraying Prime Minister Gough Whitlam in the six-hour television miniseries The Dismissal (1983).

== Biography ==
Phipps was born in Dubbo and grew up in Parkes.

He started his acting training in Sydney at the age of 21, at the Ensemble Theatre. There he appeared in such productions as Buffalo Skinner, Long Day's Journey into Night, Fortune and Men's Eyes, The Removalists and Rooted. In the Sydney Opera House's inaugural season he played Harry Bustle in What If You Died Tomorrow?. In London he reprised this role, as well as appearing in Don's Party. He played Dr Frank-N-Furter in The Rocky Horror Show in Melbourne in 1975–77.

His most notable screen roles included Bernie Dump in The Miraculous Mellops, The Toadie in Mad Max 2 (1981), Prime Minister Gough Whitlam in the television mini-series The Dismissal (1983), Sir Frank Packer in True Believers (1988), and Queensland Police Commissioner Terry Lewis in the Four Corners TV documentary drama Police State (1989), which helped to bring about investigations into corruption within that state's police force and political system. He was nominated for an AFI award for his role in Stir (1980). Other films included The Cars That Ate Paris (1974), Thirst (1979), Nightmares (1980), Dead Easy (1982), The Return of Captain Invincible (1983), Savage Islands (1983), which was released in the United States as Nate and Hayes, Sky Pirates (1986) and What the Moon Saw (1990). He appeared as Detective Inspector Mcallister in the Inspector Morse episode "The Promised Land" in 1991, which was set in Australia. Phipps also played the role of Edward "Dinosaur" Spence in the first season of the short lived Australian television series "FIRE" (1995) set in Queensland.

In the early to late 1990s he also briefly worked on the ill-fated video game Wizardry: Stones of Arnhem at DirectSoft which was being contracted out to them by Sirtech.

Phipps died from cancer in Sydney, on 6 August 2000, at the age of 60. He never married and was survived by his three siblings.

== Filmography ==
=== Film ===
Year	Title	Role	Type
1964	Split Level	Louis	TV movie
1969	You Can't See 'round Corners	Keith Grayson	Feature film
1974	The Tony Hancock Special	Hotel Clerk	TV movie
1974	The Cars That Ate Paris	Mulray	Feature film
1975	Polly Me Love		TV movie
1977	Benny Hill Down Under	Various roles	TV movie
1979	Temperament Unsuited	Supervisor	Short film
1979	Thirst	Mr. Hodge	Feature film
1980	Stir	Norton	Feature film
1980	Nightmares	George D'alberg	Feature film
1981	Mad Max 2	The Toadie	Feature film
1982	Dead Easy	Francis	Feature film
1983	The Return of Captain Invincible	Admiral	Feature film
1983	Savage Islands	Ben Pease	Feature film
1983	Who Killed Baby Azaria?	Mr. Baker QC	TV movie
1985	Emoh Ruo	Sam Tregado	Feature film
1986	Sky Pirates (aka Nate and Hayes)	Savage	Feature film
1986	The Blue Lightning	Brutus Cathcart	TV movie
1986	Body Business	Max	TV movie
1987	Dark Age	John Besser	Feature film
1989	Police State	Queensland Police Commissioner Terry Lewis	TV docudrama movie
1989	How Wonderful!	The Doctor	TV movie
1990	What the Moon Saw	Mr. Zachary	Feature film
1990	Sky Trackers	Doctor Giles	TV movie
1999	Without Warning	Mayberry	TV movie

=== Television ===
Year	Title	Role	Type
1964	The Stranger	Soshuniss Citizen	TV miniseries
1964	Consider Your Verdict		TV series, 1 episode
1969	Delta	Tony Spencer	TV series, 1 episode
1970	Woobinda, Animal Doctor		TV series, 1 episode
1971	The Thursday Creek Mob	Lieutenant Wigg	TV series
1971	Dynasty	Dr. Loftus	TV series, 1 episode
1972	Catwalk	Jack Wilson	TV series, 1 episode
1972	A Nice Day at the Office	Graeme 'Snow' Carter	TV series, 1 episode
1972	Boney	Morris Answorth	TV series, 1 episode
1972	Snake Gully with Dad and Dave	Harry Phealy	TV series, 1 episode
1972	Behind the Legend		TV series. 1 episode
1973	Ryan	Bradley	TV series, 1 episode
1975	Shannon's Mob	Patrick Ryan	TV series, 1 episode
1979	Glenview High		TV series, 1 episode
1980–81	Cop Shop	Glen Anderson / Harry Shelton / Clyde Hewitt / Robert Doyle	TV series, 7 episodes
1981	Holiday Island	Matthew Kramer	TV series, 2 episodes
1981	Bellamy	Evans	TV series, 1 episode
1982	Women of the Sun	Doug Cutler	TV miniseries, 1 episode
1983	The Dismissal	Prime Minister Gough Whitlam	TV miniseries, 3 episodes
1983	Carson's Law	Inspector Cullen	TV series, 2 episodes
1984	Special Squad	Arthur Lambert / Arthur	TV series, 2 episodes
1985	Zoo Family	Elephant Jim	TV series, 1 episode
1986	My Brother Tom	J.B.Strapp	TV miniseries, 1 episode
1988	True Believers	Sir Frank Packer	TV miniseries, 2 episodes
1988	Rafferty's Rules	Vern O'Connor	TV series, 1 episode
1989	Mission: Impossible	Rudensky	TV series, 1 episode
1989	This Man... This Woman	Barry Farmer	TV miniseries, 1 episode
1989	E Street	Joseph Parker	TV series, 2 episodes
1991	A Country Practice	Gordon Barlow / Gus Roach	TV series, 4 episodes
1991	Inspector Morse	Detective Inspector Glenn McAllister	TV series, episode "The Promised Land"
1991	Screen One	Ray	TV series, 1 episode
1991–92	The Miraculous Mellops	Bernie Dump	TV series, 20 episodes
1992	G.P.	Derek Harwood	TV series, 1 episode
1995	Fire	Edward 'Dinosaur' Spence	TV series, 13 episodes
1995	Snowy River: The McGregor Saga	Commissioner Henry Dengate	TV series, 1 episode
1996	Naked: Stories of Men	Leonard	TV series, 1 episode
1996	Halifax f.p.	Detective Inspector Derrida	TV series, 1 episode
1997	Bullpitt!	Archbishop	TV series, 1 episode
1998	Wildside	Sam Farmer	TV series, 1 episode
1998–99	All Saints	Joe Goretski	TV series, 2 episodes
1999	Big Sky	Ellison	TV series, 2 episodes
1999	Noah's Ark	Jezer	TV miniseries, 2 episodes
1999	Farscape	Pa'u Tuzak	TV series, 1 episode
