= Thirst (1979 film) =

- Theatrical film poster
- Directed by: Rod Hardy
- Screenplay by: John Pinkney
- Produced by: Antony I. Ginnane
- Starring: Chantal Contouri; Shirley Cameron; Max Phipps; Henry Silva; Rod Mullinar; David Hemmings
- Cinematography: Vince Monton
- Edited by: Philip Reid
- Music by: Brian May
- Production companies: F.G. Film Productions; New South Wales Film Corporation; Victorian Film Corporation
- Distributed by: GUO Film Distributors
- Release date: 28 September 1979
- Running time: 93 minutes
- Country: Australia
- Language: English
- Budget: $750,000

Thirst is a 1979 Australian horror film directed by Rod Hardy and starring Chantal Contouri, Max Phipps, and David Hemmings. It follows a woman who is kidnapped by a blood-drinking cult of modern vampires who believe her to be a descendant of Elizabeth Báthory. It has been described as a blend of vampire and science fiction genres, influenced by the 1973 film Soylent Green as well as drawing on the folklore of Elizabeth Báthory – one of several vampire films in the 1970s to do so.

The film was released in Australia in September 1979, and later was distributed in the United States by New Line Cinema in 1980.

== Plot ==
Unmarried professional Kate Davis is kidnapped by a shadowy organization known as 'The Brotherhood'. This organization believes her to be a direct descendant of Elizabeth Báthory and claim to be part of an ancient race that consumes blood in order to retain their youth and strength. They have taken her to a hospital-like compound where they clinically 'bleed' brainwashed and hypnotised humans and harvest and consume their blood. Kate is horrified by what she sees and refuses to join, or to take one of the Brotherhood as a mate. She manages to steal a truck and flee the compound but is re-captured.

Kate continues to be unreceptive to the Brotherhood and their practices, leading to them using hallucinogens to break down her resistance. Only one member, Dr. Fraser, is against this treatment as he believes that it will only result in losing her respect for them even if it's successful. Kate is brainwashed and initiated into the cult through a ceremony that involves her using fake metallic fangs to drink the blood of a sacrificial victim.

Once home, Kate acts as if she has seemingly forgotten all that happened, only for her to end up killing a woman in her apartment and drinking her blood. Once back at the compound, Kate is still resistant to drinking blood and taking the lives of other humans. In an attempt to make her comply, the Brotherhood kidnaps her lover Derek and brings him to the farm. Dr. Fraser helps him escape and seeks out Kate, seemingly in an attempt to reunite them. But it's revealed that he is also descended from a vampire lineage and seeks a union with her. He did save Derek from the farm, but only so he could drain Derek's blood and offer it to Kate. Initially angry at seeing Derek's drained body, Kate's will is finally broken and she submits to Dr. Fraser and the Brotherhood.

== Cast ==
- Chantal Contouri as Kate Davis
- Max Phipps as Mr. Hodge
- David Hemmings as Dr. Fraser
- Henry Silva as Dr. Gauss
- Shirley Cameron as Mrs. Barker
- Rod Mullinar as Derek
- Amanda Muggleton as Martha
- Christopher Milne as David
- Robert Thompson as Sean
- Lulu Pinkus as Nurse
- Walter Pym as Ditcher

== Production ==
=== Development ===
Producer Antony I. Ginnane followed his then-usual practice of hiring new directors from television by giving the job of directing to Rod Hardy.

=== Casting ===
Producer Ginnane had sought out Hemmings and American Henry Silva in supporting roles to bolster the film's popularity outside Australia. Donald Pleasence was originally considered for Silva's role, but the production could not afford to hire him due to his rising popularity after the success of Halloween (1978). Chantal Contouri was cast in the film based on her performance in Snapshot (1979).

David Hemmings accepted the role of Dr. Fraser, which Ginnane said he took as he was suffering financial difficulty at the time and needed to work.

=== Filming ===
The film was shot in Melbourne. The artists' colony of Montsalvat north of Melbourne was used as the cult's headquarters.

== Release ==
Thirst was released on 28 September 1979 in Australia. New Line Cinema acquired the film for U.S. distribution, giving it a test market release in New Orleans on 25 January 1980. On 7 March 1980, it screened at Filmex in Los Angeles, California in a midnight showing. It later opened regionally on 9 May 1980 in Lexington, Kentucky.

=== Home media ===
Synapse Films released Thirst on DVD in October 2008. In 2014, Severin Films released the film in a Blu-ray and DVD combination set. Indicator Films released the film on Blu-ray and 4K UHD Blu-ray in limited edition sets in both the United Kingdom and United States on 18 March 2025.

== Reception ==
=== Box office ===
The film performed poorly at the Australian box office, through Ginnane noted that it did perform slightly better than his previous feature, Snapshot, largely due to exhibition at drive-in theaters.

=== Critical response ===
The Sydney Morning Herald panned it as a "B-grade" vampire film, criticising the performance of Contouri as well as Hardy's direction as "bizarre" yet "singularly unthreatening." Critic Bill Warren, reviewing the film for its opening at the Filmex festival in Los Angeles, felt that "despite a novel premise and some good acting... the film is basically a failure because the central idea is rather silly."

The film was highly regarded by influential American film critic Leonard Maltin, who gave it three stars out of four.

On review aggregator Rotten Tomatoes the film holds a rare 100% fresh rating from 5 reviews.

== See also ==
- Cinema of Australia
- Vampire film

== Sources ==
- Ginnane, Antony I. (2025). Memories of Thirst. Thirst (Supplemental booklet for 4K UHD Blu-ray). Indicator Films. pp. 19–40.
- Maltin, Leonard (2004). Leonard Maltin's 2005 Movie Guide. New York City, New York: Signet. ISBN 978-0-451-21481-2.
- Murray, Scott; Caputo, Raffaele (1993). Australian Film 1978-1992: A Survey of Theatrical Features. Oxford, England: Oxford University Press. ISBN 978-0-195-53584-6.
- Silver, Alain; Ursini, James (1993). The Vampire Film: From Nosferatu to Bram Stoker's Dracula. New York City, New York: Limelight. ISBN 978-0-879-10170-1.
- Stratton, Dave (1980). The Last New Wave: The Australian Film Revival. Sydney, Australia: Angus & Robertson. ISBN 978-0-207-14146-1.
