= Briony Behets =

English-Australian actress

- Born: 21 July 1950 (age 76); London, England
- Education: Guildhall School of Music and Drama
- Occupations: Actress, weather reporter
- Years active: 1972–
- Spouse: Colin Eggleston

Briony Behets (born 21 July 1950)is an English-born Australian actress who initially found fame acting in television soap operas of the 1970s and 1980s.

She is known for her early roles in serials Birds in the Bush, Number 96, The Box, Bellbird, and Class of '75. Behets was also a weather presenter on ATV-10 Melbourne's news bulletins during the mid-1970s.

She received an AFI Award nomination for her role in The Trespassers (1976), and starred in telemovie Skin Deep in 1984.

Later roles include Eve Cambridge in Possession, Amanda Harris in Neighbours, which she reprised in 2025, Margaret Bennett in E Street, Diana Stevens in British soap opera Families, and Elizabeth Regnery in The Saddle Club.

== Early and personal life ==
Behets was born in London, United Kingdom in 1950. Her father worked as a civil engineer, which took him around the world and as a result much of Behets' childhood was spent in Germany and Sierra Leone before returning to England. At age 17 she was accepted into the Guildhall School of Music and Drama in London, studying there for three years. After completing the course, she travelled to the United States as part of a student exchange project, working there as a nightclub dancer.

After moving to Australia, Behets lived in Melbourne. She was an experienced horsewoman and owned several horses in Mornington.

== Career ==
Behets made a few appearances in stage plays while she was in college. She came to Australia, aged 19, to travel around the country. She firstly became a model, before securing a role in the comedy series Birds in the Bush in 1972.

Behet's subsequently enjoyed several high-profile television roles in Australia. She was an original cast member of soap opera Number 96, playing a heavily pregnant young wife Helen Eastwood in 1972. Who moves into the back of flats with her schoolteacher husband Mark, but then losers the baby after falling down a flight of stairs, after discovering her husband is having an affair with Rose from the deli. Behets felt she was "terrible" in the role, as she was inexperienced and did not know anything about having a baby.

She also appeared in a stage production of Don's Party as Sue, and a J. C. Williamson's production of Private Lives.

Behets was a member of the original cast of another adult soap The Box, as Judy Donovan, starting in 1974. The character was popular with viewers and Behets received a lot of fan mail from housewives and young men. After leaving The Box, she appeared for a short stint in Bellbird, before taking an ongoing role in the school-based teen soap Class of '75 as sports mistress Jorja Jones.

Behets was also a longtime weather presenter on ATV-10 Melbourne's news bulletins during the mid-1970s.

She had guest roles in numerous Australian drama series, including Homicide, Matlock Police, Bluey, Cop Shop, The Young Doctors, Boney, and Chopper Squad, also in the 1970s. In 1979, she portrayed Susan Rice, the unbalanced wife of a popular celebrity, in the women's prison soap opera Prisoner.

Behets' film roles include Night of Fear (1972), the joint lead with Judy Morris in The Trespassers (1976) for which she was nominated for the AFI Award for Best Actress in a Leading Role, Raw Deal (1977), Inside Looking Out (1977), and Long Weekend (1978). In 1984, she starred in the Nine Network telemovie Skin Deep, followed by a role in Cassandra in 1986.

Later TV guest roles included Prime Time, A Country Practice and The Flying Doctors in the 1980s. Later soap roles included appearances in Possession as the mother of a spoiled child actor, Neighbours as Amanda Harris, the mother of regular character Jane Harris (Annie Jones); and E Street as Margaret Bennett, Lisa Bennett's mother, for six months, in 1989.

Starting in 1990, Behets was a regular lead in the British Granada Television soap Families. She returned to Australia in 1992, to star in black comedy play It's Ralph at the Marian Street Theatre. She also had a guest lead in Chances as Dr Christine Marquette. In 1996, Behets guest starred in Season 12 of the American television series Murder, She Wrote, in an episode titled "Southern Double-Cross". The episode was set in Australia, but filmed in the United States.

In the 2000s, Behets guest starred in some US drama series such as JAG. She returned to Neighbours in July 2008, in another role as Kate Newton a romantic interest for Harold Bishop (Ian Smith). She had also appeared alongside Smith in Neighbours 21 years earlier in 1987, when she played Amanda Harris. She joined the regular cast of The Saddle Club during series three as the second actor to portray Mrs. Reg.

In April 2025, Behets reprised her role of Amanda Harris in Neighbours.

== Personal life ==
Behets was married to Australian writer and director Colin Eggleston. She starred in several of his movies including Long Weekend (1978) and Nightmares (1980).

== Filmography ==
=== Film ===
Year	Title	Role	Notes
1972	Night of Fear	Horse rider	Feature film
1974	Alvin Rides Again	Girl in Taxi	Feature film
1976	The Trespassers	Penny	Nominated – AACTA Award for Best Actress in a Leading Role
1977	Raw Deal	Alex's Lady	Feature film
1977	Inside Looking Out	Elizabeth	Feature film
1978	Long Weekend	Marcia	Feature film
1980	Nightmares	Angela	Feature film
1980	The Talking Bow Tie		Short film
1986	Cassandra	Helen	Feature film
1997	Allie & Me	Woman in salon	Feature film (US)
2008	Not Quite Hollywood: The Wild, Untold Story of Ozploitation!	Herself	Feature film documentary

=== Television ===
Year	Title	Role	Notes
1972	Number 96	Helen Eastwood	27 episodes
1972	Birds in the Bush	Tuesday	13 episodes
1973	Wicked City		TV film
1974	The Evil Touch	Miss Prentice	1 episode
1974	Matlock Police	Joyce Roberts	1 episode
1974–1975	The Box	Judy Donovan	207 episodes
1975	Homicide	Helen Green	1 episode
1975	Class of '75	Jorja Jones	98 episodes
1975–1976	Bellbird	Claire	152 episodes
1976	Bluey	Kate Wallace	Episode: "The First Bloody Day"
1976	Alvin Purple	Pam	Episode: "The Hustled"
1976	Power Without Glory	Celia	Miniseries, 1 episode
1976	Tandarra	Esther Grafton	Episode: "Come the Revolution"
1977	Young Ramsay	Guest role: Chrissie Thompson	Episode: "Yellow Dog"
1978	The Lion's Share	Janet Jackson	TV movie
1978; 1979; 1980	Cop Shop	Felicity Stafford / Julie Gaskin / Diana Elliot / Barbara Sauers / Janie Palmer	7 episodes
1979	Prisoner	Susan Rice	5 episodes
1979	Chopper Squad	Debbie James	1 episode
1979	Skyways	Pam McKinnon	1 episode
1980	Water Under the Bridge	Claire	Miniseries, 1 episode
1980	Romance in the Jurgular Vein		TV film
1981	The Young Doctors	Frances Taylor	15 episodes
1981	Bellamy	Sharon	Episode: "The Axe-Man Cometh"
1982	Winner Take All	Carol Catani	Miniseries, 10 episodes
1982	Holiday Island		1 episode
1984	Skin Deep	Barbara Ramsay	TV film
1984	A Country Practice	Dee Dee Cash	Episodes: "Elementary Miss Watson Parts 1 & 2"
1984	Special Squad	Rhonda Watson	Episode: "The Second Mr. Swift"
1985	Possession	Eve Cambridge	TV series
1986	Hunger	Mrs. Levey	TV film
1987; 2008; 2025	Neighbours	Amanda Harris / Kate Newton	13 episodes; ongoing
1989	The Flying Doctors	Jean Lambert	Episode: "All You Need Is Luck"
1989	The Heroes	Alice	Miniseries
1989	Living with the Law		
1989–1990	E Street	Margaret Bennett	25 episodes
1990	Flair	Samantha Harmon	Miniseries, 2 episodes
1990–1992	Families	Diana Stevens	10 episodes
1991	Chances	Dr. Christine Marquette	2 episodes: "Sexual Therapy", "Bodies and Soul"
1992	Bony		1 episode
1994	G.P.	Janet Ryan	Episode: "Something Old, Something New"
1996	Murder, She Wrote	Melba Drummond	Episode: "Southern Double-Cross"
2000	JAG	Jenny	2 episodes: "Boomerang Parts 1 & 2"
2002	Marshall Law	Sonia	Episode: "Life in the Raw"
2002	Guinevere Jones	Louise Rosen	26 episodes
2008–2009	The Saddle Club	Mrs. Reg / Elizabeth Regnery	26 episodes

=== Television (as self) ===
Year	Title	Role	Notes
	All About Faces	Contestant	TV series
1975	Pot of Gold	Celebrity Judge	TV series
1975–1976	Ten Eyewitness News Melbourne	Weather Presenter	News show

== Stage ==
Year	Title	Role	Notes
1972–1973	Don's Party	Susan	UNSW, Playhouse, Canberra, Warner Theatre, Adelaide, Russell Street Theatre, Melbourne, Theatre Royal, Hobart, Hunter Theatre, Newcastle, Playhouse, Perth & regional tour with MTC, NIDA & Old Tote Theatre Company & J. C. Williamson's
1976	Private Lives	Sibyl Chase	Comedy Theatre, Melbourne, Her Majesty's Theatre, Sydney with J. C. Williamson's
1992	It's Ralph	Claire	Marian Street Theatre, Sydney
