= Ron McLean (writer) =

- Born: 22 July 1944; Rose Bay, New South Wales Australia
- Died: 31 July 1983 (aged 39); Sydney, New South Wales, Australia
- Occupations: Screenwriter, producer, EP
- Years active: 1969-1984

Ron McLean (22 July 1944 – 31 July 1983) was an Australian screenwriter, producer and executive producer, best known for his work on TV, writing series and TV films, he wrote dramas, adventures and thrillers, he was perhaps best known for writing most of the episodes for Spyforce, which he helped create. He had a long collaboration with producer Roger Mirams.

== Biography ==
McLean was born in Rose Bay, New South Wales and was running a woman's shoe shop in Double Bay, Sydney, and had no background in the performing arts industry, when he read an article about a TV series being made in Australia, Riptide (1969). He sent them a couple of stories which the show liked and he taught himself how to adapt them into scripts. He wrote some episodes of Skippy the Bush Kangaroo and did sketches for The Mavis Bramston Show. He came much in demand in the early 1970s, writing a number of shows for Crawford Productions.

McLean met Roger Mirams when working on Woobinda, Animal Doctor. The two formed a production company, South Pacific Films, which made Spyforce.

McLean was also one of a team of four people who wrote children's books under the name of Mary Elliott.

In the early 1980s he set up Ron McLean Productions which produced Airhawk, The Little Feller and Outbreak of Hostilities. The company went into liquidation in 1982.

=== Personal life ===
McLean married Elizabeth, and together they have three daughters, Sara, Sallie, Samantha and son Steven.

He died suddenly from a heart attack in Sydney, aged 39, on 31 July 1983 (Note: one source states 1985, Austlit however gives 1983)

== Select credits ==
- Skippy the Bush Kangaroo (1969) (TV series) – writer
- Riptide (1969) (TV series) – writer
- The Mavis Bramston Show (TV series) – writer
- Good Morning Mr Doubleday (1969) (TV series) – writer
- Woobinda, Animal Doctor (1969–70) (TV series) – writer
- The Galloping Gourmet (TV series) – writer
- The Rovers (1969–70) (TV series) – writer, script editor
- Homicide (1970–71) (TV series) – writer – episodes include "The Cat", "Flash Johnny", "Juliet"
- Spyforce (1971–72) (TV series) – co-creator, associate producer, writer
- Barrier Reef (1972) (TV series) – writer
- Ryan (1973) (TV series) – writer
- Division Four (1973) (TV series) – writer
- Silent Number (1974–76) (TV series) – creator, writer, co-producer, director of episode
- Certain Women (TV series) – writer
- The Evil Touch (1974) (TV series) – writer
- Human Target (1974) (TV movie) – writer, producer
- Number 96 (TV series) – writer
- Delta (TV series) – writer
- Case for the Defence (1978) (TV series) – writer, co-producer
- Secret Doors (TV series) – writer
- King's Men (1976–79) (TV series) – creator, writer
- Glenview High (1977–79) (TV series) – writer, producer
- Night Nurse (1978) (TV movie) – writer
- Chopper Squad (1978) (TV series) – writer
- Prisoner: Cell Block H (1979) (TV series) – writer
- The Young Doctors (TV series) – writer
- Airhawk (1981) (a.k.a. Star of the North) (TV movie) – writer, co-producer
- Bellamy (1981) (TV series) – creator, writer
- Island Trader (1982) (TV movie) – writer
- Outbreak of Hostilities (1983) (TV movie) – writer, co-producer
- The Little Feller (1983) (TV movie) – writer, co-producer
- Innocent Prey (1984) – writer

== Books as "Mary Elliot" ==
- Clare Carson and the Sheep Duffers : Bush Nurse in the Australian Outback Hawthorn : Lloyd O'Neil, 1970
- Clare Carson and the Gold Rush : Bush Nurse in the Australian Outback Adelaide : Rigby, 1970
- Clare Carson at Wilga Junction : Bush Nurse in the Australian Outback, Adelaide : Rigby, 1970
- Clare Carson and the Runaways : Bush Nurse in the Australian Outback Adelaide : Rigby, 1970
