= The Trespassers =

- Directed by: John Duigan
- Written by: John Duigan
- Produced by: John Duigan
- Starring: Judy Morris
- Cinematography: Vince Monton
- Edited by: Tony Patterson
- Music by: Bruce Smeaton
- Production company: Vega Film Productions
- Distributed by: Filmways
- Release dates: 18 August 1976 (Melbourne); February 1979 (Sydney)
- Running time: 88 mins.
- Country: Australia
- Language: English
- Budget: AU $130,000

The Trespassers is a 1976 film directed by John Duigan and starring Judy Morris and Briony Behets.

== Premise ==
In 1970, political journalist Richard lives with Penny but is having an affair with actress Dee. The two women meet and become friends.

== Cast ==
- Judy Morris as Dee
- Briony Behets as Penny
- John Derum as Richard
- Hugh Keays-Byrne as Frank
- Peter Carmody as Ted
- Camilla Nicoll as Jenny
- Diana Greentree as Angela
- Max Gillies as Publisher
- Chris Haywood as Sandy
- Sydney Conabere as Harry
- John Frawley

== Production ==
$70,000 of the budget came from the Australian Film Commission. The film was shot in Melbourne and in south Gippsland in late winter of 1975.
