= Snapshot (1979 film) =

1979 film by Simon Wincer

- Australian film poster
- Directed by: Simon Wincer
- Written by: Chris De Roche; Everett De Roche
- Produced by: Antony I. Ginnane
- Starring: Chantal Contouri; Robert Bruning; Sigrid Thornton; Hugh Keays-Byrne; Denise Drysdale; Vincent Gil; Jon Sidney; Jacqui Gordon; Julia Blake
- Cinematography: Vince Monton
- Edited by: Philip Reid
- Music by: Brian May
- Production companies: Australian International Film Corporation; Filmways Australasian Distributors; F.G. Film Productions; Australian Film Commission; Victorian Film Corporation
- Distributed by: Filmways Australasian Distributors
- Release date: 1 June 1979
- Running time: 92 minutes
- Country: Australia
- Language: English
- Budget: $300,000 (est.)

Snapshot (also known as The Day After Halloween and One More Minute in the US) is a 1979 Australian thriller film directed by Simon Wincer in his feature film directorial debut. It stars Sigrid Thornton, Chantal Contouri and Robert Bruning. The film was shot on an estimated budget of $300,000.

== Plot ==
Angela, a young and naive hairdresser in Melbourne, dreams of saving enough money to live abroad. However, she is under the thumb of her overbearing, puritanical mother, who controls Angela's finances. One day, Angela is encouraged by one of her clients, a glamorous model named Madeline, to pursue print modeling. Angela reluctantly agrees and completes an outdoor photoshoot in which she poses topless, for a photographer named Linsey, for a perfume advert in a women's magazine.

After attending a party with Madeline, Angela returns home to find her mother has locked her out after finding about Angela's modeling. Her ex-boyfriend Daryl, an ice cream truck driver, arrives, and the two get into an argument; he wants to rekindle their relationship, but Angela has no interest. With nowhere to go, Angela returns to Linsey's home and he allows her to spend the night. Angela soon finds herself absorbed into the modeling world. She is subsequently approached by her mother, who requests Angela pay for medical bills accrued by her younger sister.

Angela visits Elmer, the wealthy owner of the modeling agency, at his mansion for a supposed barbecue. Once there, she finds she is the sole guest. Elmer regales Angela, telling he will be able to get her widespread exposure, even assuring her he can help her attain an acting career in Los Angeles. He convinces her to undress and begins to photograph her, but she senses she has been exploited and abruptly leaves.

Angela returns to the house she is sharing with Linsey and several other models, and is notified by her roommate Wendy that a man dropped off a bag of her belongings. When Angela goes to her bedroom, there appears to be somebody hiding under her bedcovers. Angela anxiously grabs some nearby scissors to defend herself, and then peels back her blanket to reveal a severed pig's head in her bed.

Later, Angela is offered a modeling job in Fiji. While packing to leave, she hears the tune of an ice cream truck and spots one outside her window. Fearing that Daryl is stalking her, she attempts to leave unnoticed, but is confronted by him outside. Angela flees on foot and travels to the agency but finds the offices apparently empty. Before she can leave, she is confronted by Elmer, who tries to force her to pose for him. Realizing Elmer is obsessed with her, Angela attempts to fight him off, but a struggle ensues in which she sets him on fire, burning him to death.

Daryl arrives at the agency and attempts to rescue Angela by knocking down the door, but is unable to. Angela then unlocks the room from the inside and runs headlong into Daryl. The pair evade the authorities and flee into an alleyway behind the building. Angela confronts Daryl about the pig's head left in her bed, but he responds with confusion, insisting he did not place it there. Suddenly, Madeline, driving Daryl's truck, collides with him, killing him instantly. A shocked Angela is hurried into the truck by Madeline, who tells her she will be late for her plane to Fiji.

== Cast ==
- Sigrid Thornton as Angela
- Julia Blake as Mrs Bailey, her mother
- Chantal Contouri as Madeline
- Robert Bruning as Elmer, wealthy creep married to Madeline
- Hugh Keays-Byrne as Linsey, photographer
- Denise Drysdale as Lily
- Vincent Gil as Daryl, "Mr Whippy" stalker
- Christine Amor as Paula
- Lulu Pinkus as Wendy
- Christopher Milne as Bachelor

== Production ==
Ginnane had originally intended to make a film after Patrick called Centrefold, based on a script by Chris Fitchett, and raised money for it. He showed it to television director Simon Wincer who only liked the fact the script was set in the modelling world and there was a Mr Whippy van. Ginnane then commissioned Everett De Roche to write a new screenplay. Wincer says he and De Roche re-wrote it in three weeks, and the film took eleven weeks from the first day of shooting until sitting down with the release print.

Sigrid Thornton was cast two days before shooting started.

"It was a very easy film to make and probably my most pleasant experience to date" said Ginnane in 1979. The budget was $100,000 less than for Patrick (1978).

Ginnane then took the film to the US where he sat down with an editor and cut 12 minutes out of the film. According to Wincer, these were mostly lighter scenes, and a moment where it is explained Elmer is married to Madeline. This meant Wincer was not happy with the final result although he says "for what it is, it is quite a good little film."

The musical soundtrack was produced for release by Brian May and Phillip Powers for the 1M1 Records label many years later on CD under its overseas title.

== Release ==
The film performed poorly at the Australian box office, only running a week in Melbourne, but sold very well overseas.

=== Home media ===
Snapshot was first released on DVD in the United States on 26 November 2002. A second release was made under the title The Day After Halloween via Scorpion Releasing on 24 July 2012 and was presented in its original aspect ratio of 2.35:1. It was given a Blu-ray release by Vinegar Syndrome under its original title on 29 August 2017 with special features including the Australian version presented in SD and extended interviews from Not Quite Hollywood.
