= Outbreak of Hostilities =

- Directed by: David Copping
- Written by: Ron McLean
- Produced by: Ron McLean; Colin Eggleston
- Starring: George Mallaby; Cornelia Frances
- Cinematography: Kevan Lind
- Edited by: Pippa Anderson
- Production company: Ron McLean Productions
- Release dates: 1981; 1985 (video)
- Country: Australia
- Language: English

Outbreak of Hostilities is a 1981 Australian film set prior to the beginning of World War II.

== Cast ==
- Scott Burgess as Bobby
- Colleen Fitzpatrick as Barbara
- Cornelia Frances as Miriam
- George Mallaby as Vince

== Production ==
The film was one of three low budget movies made by Ron McLean Productions, set up by Ron McLean in association with Colin Eggleston. Described as "a sort of rip-off of The Sullivans about a sensitive young man (Scott Burgess) having a fling with an older woman (Cornelia Frances!) on the eve of World War Two" the movie was partly filmed in Toowoon Bay at the holiday resort ‘Kim’s Camp’.
