= Visitors (2003 film) =

- Theatrical film poster
- Directed by: Richard Franklin
- Written by: Everett De Roche
- Produced by: Richard Franklin; Jennifer Hadden
- Starring: Radha Mitchell; Susannah York; Ray Barrett
- Cinematography: Ellery Ryan
- Edited by: David Pulbrook
- Music by: Nerida Tyson-Chew
- Production company: Bayside Pictures
- Distributed by: Beyond Films
- Release dates: 15 June 2003 (Commonwealth Film Festival); 27 November 2003 (Australia)
- Running time: 100 minutes
- Country: Australia
- Language: English
- Budget: nearly A$6 million
- Box office: $34,270 (Australia)

Visitors is a 2003 Australian psychological horror film directed by Richard Franklin (his final film), produced by Jennifer Hadden, and starring Radha Mitchell, Susannah York and Ray Barrett.

== Premise ==
The film deals with the feelings of a young woman sailing solo on a yacht around the world. The loneliness makes her start losing her sanity.

== Cast ==
- Radha Mitchell as Georgia Perry
- Dominic Purcell as Luke
- Tottie Goldsmith as Casey
- Susannah York as Carolyn Perry
- Ray Barrett as Bill Perry
- Che Timmins as Kai
- Christopher Kirby as Rob
- Phil Ceberano as Pirate Captain

== Production ==
Richard Franklin says he wanted to make a thriller along the lines of Patrick.

It all takes place in one room, essentially with one character, and a number of supernatural or otherworldly events. Not necessarily like Patrick, but it was actually what I said to Everett: "Can you give me something that all takes place in one room again?" And he said, well, could it be on a boat? And I said, okay.

== Reception ==
=== Box office ===
Visitors grossed $34,270 at the box office in Australia.

=== Critical response ===
JR Southall of Starburst called the acting "terrific".

== See also ==
- Cinema of Australia
