= Nightmares (1980 film) =

- Theatrical release poster
- Directed by: John D. Lamond
- Screenplay by: Colin Eggleston
- Story by: John D. Lamond; John-Michael Howson
- Produced by: John D. Lamond; Colin Eggleston
- Starring: Jenny Neumann; Gary Sweet; Nina Landis; Max Phipps; John-Michael Howson; Briony Behets; Maureen Edwards; Sue Jones; Jennie Lamond; Adele Lewin; Edmund Pegge; Peter Tulloch; Bryon Williams
- Cinematography: Garry Wapshott
- Edited by: Colin Eggleston
- Music by: Brian May
- Production companies: Bioscope; John Lamond Motion Picture Enterprises; Movityme
- Distributed by: Roadshow Entertainment
- Release date: 30 October 1980 (Australia)
- Running time: 82 minutes
- Country: Australia
- Language: English
- Budget: $200,000–$500,000
- Box office: $168,000 (Australia)

Nightmares (also known as Stage Fright) is a 1980 Australian slasher film, directed by John D. Lamond and was Gary Sweet's feature film debut.

== Plot ==
A young girl named Cathy tries to keep her mother from making out with a man while driving one day, and she inadvertently causes her mother's death in the ensuing crash. Sixteen years later, Cathy is now named Helen and has become a psychotic actress and is starring in an upcoming play called Comedy of Blood, where the actors are picked off one by one by an unseen assailant with a shard of glass.

== Cast ==
- Jenny Neumann as Cathy/Helen Selleck
  - Jennie Lamond as Young Cathy
- Gary Sweet as Terry Besanko
- Max Phipps as George D'alberg
- John Michael Howson as Bennett Collingwood
- Nina Landis as Judy
- Edmund Pegge as Bruce
- Briony Behets as Angela
- Sue Jones as Fay

== Production ==
The film was shot by Lamond immediately after Pacific Banana (late 1979—early 1980) and edited at the same time. Lamond:

Nightmares should have been a lot better. We used the Steadicam camera for the first time in Australia on that. It was all right, but it didn't have any story. The technique was all right. Brian May's music was great. It was dumped by the distributor. No-one tried, nobody did anything. But it should have been better. Because it was a real quickie. I had the chance to make a real quickie, they said if you don't take the money we'll give it to somebody else. That was back in the old tax regime. You had to get the money, make the film, be finished by a certain time, you couldn't take longer.

Lamond says it was John Michael Howson's idea to set the movie in a theatre.

The film features a bitchy theatre critic called Bennett Collingswood (played by John Michael Howson) who many observers felt was a veiled attack on Colin Bennett, film critic of The Age who was often critical of Australian films.

It was the first professional job for Gary Sweet who later called the film "terrible, diabolical" but says it got him thinking "acting was, you know, all right."
