= Dark Age (film) =

1987 horror adventure film by Arch Nicholson

- Theatrical film poster
- Directed by: Arch Nicholson
- Screenplay by: Sonia Borg
- Based on: Numunwari by Grahame Webb
- Produced by: Basil Appleby
- Starring: John Jarratt; Nikki Coghill; Max Phipps; Burnam Burnam; Gulpilil; Ray Meagher
- Cinematography: Andrew Lesnie
- Edited by: Adrian Carr
- Music by: Danny Beckerman
- Production companies: RKO Pictures; FGH; International Film Management
- Distributed by: Embassy Home Entertainment
- Release date: July 10, 1987
- Running time: 91 minutes
- Countries: Australia; United States
- Language: English
- Budget: A$4.8 million

Dark Age is a 1987 horror adventure film directed by Arch Nicholson, produced by Antony I. Ginnane and starring John Jarratt, Nikki Coghill, and Max Phipps. The film is an adaptation of the novel Numunwari by Australian conservationist Grahame Webb. The plot follows an Australian park ranger tasked with hunting Numunwari, a 25-foot crocodile sacred to the local Aboriginal people. The film was released on July 10, 1987.

== Plot ==
During a massive rainstorm, a trio of poachers head out into a local river in the Northern Territory to hunt crocodiles. Upon finding a massive, 7.6 metre/25-foot long saltwater crocodile, they attempt to shoot it. However, the reptile reacts tipping their boat over and attacking them. A sole survivor escapes—John Besser (Max Phipps).

The next day, ranger and herpetologist Steve Harris (John Jarratt), Oondabund (Burnum Burnum), the leader of a local Aboriginal community, and Adjaral (David Gulpilil) head out to check on the poachers and rescue Besser. Besser, however, vows revenge against the beast.

The beast subsequently attacks and murders an Aboriginal child. Harris is assigned by his boss Rex Garret (Ray Meagher) to kill the beast. However, Oondabund refuses to allow this, revealing to Harris that the beast—named Numunwari—is believed to be a mystical repository of the community's souls.

It then kills a thug at a local harbour. Harris leads a search for it, only to turn up nothing. Harris convinces Oondabund to help him hunt the beast, in exchange for capturing and releasing it upriver away from people in its original home. A reluctant Garret agrees.

Harris, Oondabund, and Adjaral set out hunting the beast along the river. Besser and one of his friends also set out to hunt the beast by trapping it in a net, intending to kill it. However, the beast is able to drag Besser into the water and bites off his arm.

Harris, Oondabund, and Adjaral are able to successfully capture the beast and bring it into the mainland. The trio set about transporting the beast in a truck and are unknowingly pursued by Besser and his friends and Harris's girlfriend, Cathy Pope (Nikki Coghill), who intends to warn the trio. They manage to arrive at the beast's home, only for Besser and company to arrive immediately after.

Besser attacks the beast with an axe as it flees into the river, while his friends engage Harris, Oondabund, Pope, and Adjaral in a gunfight. Oondabund is fatally wounded by one of Besser's men, but the others are able to fend them off. Besser loses track of Numunwari in the river and is ambushed by the beast and dragged underwater to his death. Sometime later, Adjaral feeds Oondabund's remains to the beast in accordance with their religion.

== Cast ==
- John Jarratt as Steve Harris
- Nikki Coghill as Cathy Pope
- Max Phipps as John Besser
- Burnam Burnam as Oondabund
- David Gulpilil as Adjaral
- Ray Meagher as Rex Garret
- Jeff Ashby as Mac Wilson
- Paul Bertram as Jackson

== Production ==
The film was part of a two-picture deal between executive producer Antony I. Ginnane and Hollywood studio RKO, which also included The Lighthorsemen. Shooting took place five weeks in Cairns and one week in Alice Springs, starting 22 April 1986.

The plot shares many similarities to Jaws and contains homage shots such as the shot involving a shooting star.

== Release ==
The movie was never seen in Australia theatrically and took a long time to be seen on DVD.

== Reception ==
Dennis Schwartz of Ozus' World Movie Reviews gave a positive review, calling the film "well-produced and acted, and an intelligent environmental adventure film results."

Quentin Tarantino spoke enthusiastically of the film in the documentary Not Quite Hollywood: The Wild, Untold Story of Ozploitation!, commenting "You could re-release Dark Age in 2,000 screenings and people would go see it." In 2009, Tarantino hosted a screening for it in Sydney.

Filmink later said "The phenomenal box office success of Jaws meant producers inevitably looked towards Australia’s deadly fauna as a source of inspiration... In hindsight, it’s actually weird that more films about killer animals weren’t made in the 10BA era."

== See also ==
- List of killer crocodile films
