= Brian May (Australian composer) =

Australian film composer (1934–1997)

- Born: 28 July 1934; Adelaide, South Australia, Australia
- Died: 25 April 1997 (aged 62) Melbourne, Victoria, Australia
- Genre: Film score
- Occupations: Composer, conductor
- Instruments: Piano, violin
- Years active: 1957–1997

Brian May (28 July 1934 – 25 April 1997) was an Australian film composer and conductor who was a prominent figure during the Australian New Wave. He is perhaps best known for his scores to Mad Max and Mad Max 2.

== Life and career ==
May was born in Adelaide on 28 July 1934. He trained at the Adelaide Elder Conservatorium as a pianist, violinist and conductor. He joined the ABC Adelaide in 1957 and was asked to form and conduct the ABC Adelaide Big Band, a full-blown ensemble that was rated as the best of the ABC state-based bands. He moved to Melbourne when he was 35 to arrange and conduct the ABC's Melbourne Show band. The Show Band made its radio debut on the First Network on 13 March 1969. Background music for Australian television had previously been taken from records. May changed this by writing and arranging the themes for television programmes, including Bellbird, Return to Eden, The Last Frontier, A Dangerous Life and Darling of the Gods.

A breakthrough for May was the drama series Rush, set on the 19th-century Victorian goldfields. The theme was composed by Australian George Dreyfus, but May's arrangement of the theme was recorded by the Show Band and quickly reached the top of the Australian charts, selling more than 100,000 copies. This type of success was usually reserved for pop groups such as Sherbert and Skyhooks. May also composed the theme to the highly successful Countdown television series launched by the Melbourne Show Band. He left the ABC in 1984 and his interests turned to film music. He composed more than 30 feature film scores, including Frog Dreaming, Cloak and Dagger, Mad Max, Mad Max 2, Freddy's Dead: The Final Nightmare, Dr. Giggles and one episode of Tales from the Crypt. May preferred to orchestrate his scores himself.

== Death and legacy ==
May died in Melbourne on 25 April 1997 at the age of 62. At the time of his death, May left his collection of music manuscripts to Queensland University of Technology. The manuscripts have since been preserved by the National Library of Australia.

His will established the Brian May Trust, a charitable testamentary trust, to provide a scholarship to promising Australian film composers to study film-scoring at the University of Southern California (USC). The Trustees have determined that the scholarship will be provided for tuition in film-scoring at the USC's Thornton School of Music in the course known as the 'Scoring for Motion Pictures and Television Graduate Certificate'. The Brian May Trust Scholarship was first awarded for the 2003–2004 academic year. The scholarship later relocated to New York University's Steinhardt School, but in 2024 the Trustees announced the return of the scholarship to USC's Thornton School of Music for the 2025–2026 academic year.

== Discography ==
=== Charting albums ===
List of albums, with Australian chart positions
Title	Album details	Peak chart positions
Title	Album details	AUS
Hits of the '70s (as Brian May and the A.B.C. Melbourne Show Band)	Released: 1975; Format: LP, Cassette; Label: Hammard (HAM 002)	47
The Great Big Band Hits of the 40s (as Brian May and the A.B.C. Melbourne Show Band)	Released: 1976; Format: LP, Cassette; Label: Hammard (HAM 010)	50
More Hits of the 70's (as Brian May and the A.B.C. Melbourne Show Band)	Released: 1977; Format: LP, Cassette; Label: Hammard (HAM 015)	86

== Filmography ==
- The True Story of Eskimo Nell (1975)
- Patrick (1978)
- Mad Max (1979)
- Snapshot (1979)
- Thirst (1979)
- Twenty Good Years (1979)
- Harlequin (1980)
- Nightmares (1980)
- The Last Outlaw (1980)
- Roadgames (1981)
- The Survivor (1981)
- Gallipoli (1981) (additional music)
- The Killing of Angel Street (1981)
- Race for the Yankee Zephyr (1981)
- Mad Max 2 (1981)
- Breakfast in Paris (1982)
- Turkey Shoot (1982)
- Kitty and the Bagman (1983)
- A Slice of Life (1983)
- Cloak & Dagger (1984)
- Innocent Prey (1984)
- Missing in Action 2: The Beginning (1985)
- Frog Dreaming (1986)
- Sky Pirates (1986)
- Death Before Dishonor (1987)
- Steel Dawn (1987)
- Bloodmoon (1990)
- Dead Sleep (1990)
- Freddy's Dead: The Final Nightmare (1991)
- Dr. Giggles (1992)
- Hurricane Smith (1992)
- Blind Side (1993)

== Awards ==
Mad Max won the Australian Film Institute Award for Best Original Score. May won many other awards, including the Golden Award from the Australian Performing Rights Association.

Year	Ceremony	Project	Category	Result
1979	Australian Film Institute Awards	Mad Max	Best Original Music Score	Won
1981	Australian Film Institute Awards	Roadgames	Best Original Music Score	Nominated
1982	Australian Film Institute Awards	Mad Max 2	Best Original Music Score	Nominated
1986	Australian Film Institute Awards	Frog Dreaming	Best Original Music Score	Nominated

=== ARIA Music Awards ===
The ARIA Music Awards is an annual awards ceremony that recognises excellence, innovation, and achievement across all genres of Australian music. They commenced in 1987.

Year	Nominee / work	Award	Result	Ref.
1991	Bloodmoon	Best Original Soundtrack, Cast or Show Album	Nominated	
