= The Little Feller =

- Directed by: Colin Eggleston
- Written by: Ron McLean
- Produced by: Ron McLean; Colin Eggleston
- Starring: Steve Bisley; Sally Conabere; Lorna Lesley
- Production companies: Queensland Film Corporation; Ron McLean Productions
- Release date: 1982
- Country: Australia
- Language: English

The Little Feller is a 1982 Australian film directed by Colin Eggleston.

== Plot ==
A woman Glenda becomes obsessed with her best friend Wendy's husband Frank and seeks to remove all obstacles between them, including his young son.

== Cast ==
- Steve Bisley as Frank Blair
- Sally Conabere as Glenda
- Lorna Lesley as Wendy Blair

== Production ==
Filming took place in Brisbane. Finance came in part from the Queensland Film Corporation.

== Reception ==
The Age said "the film never loses its air of predictability. It is a poorly scripted production."
