= Fatal Sky =

- Directed by: Frank Shields
- Written by: Anthony Able (David Webb Peoples)
- Based on: Story by Brian Williams
- Produced by: Antony I. Ginnane; Steven Strick
- Starring: Michael Nouri; Darlanne Fluegel; Maxwell Caulfield; Derren Nesbitt; Charles Durning
- Release date: 1990
- Running time: 88 minutes
- Countries: Australia; UK; US; Yugoslavia
- Language: English

Fatal Sky, also known as Project Alien, is a 1990 science fiction thriller film. During pre-production, the script had a number of other titles, including No Cause for Alarm, Deadfall and Vanished. It was written by David Webb Peoples, under the pseudonym "Anthony Able".

An Australian/UK/US/Yugoslavian co-production, the film was not theatrically released and went straight to video.

== Plot ==
The pilot of a military plane sees many lights in the sky, before crashing fatally. While military authorities try to quash the story, prominent journalists George Abbott and Jeff Milker decide to investigate, with the aid of a pilot named "Bird" McNamara. The area around the crash site is desolate, the mutilated bodies of animals are found and a mysterious disease begins to affect the local population.

== Cast ==
- Michael Nouri as Jeff Milker
- Maxwell Caulfield as George Abbott
- Darlanne Fluegel as "Bird" McNamara
- Derrin Nesbitt as Arthur Corbin
- Charles Durning as Colonel Clancey
- Ray Charleson as Dr Bannister
- Sebastian Allen as Beggs
- Ena Begovic as Mrs Sumner
- Janez Vajevec as Mr Sumner
