= Inside Looking Out (film) =

- Directed by: Paul Cox
- Written by: Paul Cox; Susan Holly Jones
- Produced by: Bernard Eddy
- Starring: Briony Behets
- Cinematography: Paul Cox
- Edited by: Paul Cox
- Production company: Illumination Films
- Release date: 24 November 1977
- Running time: 88 mins
- Country: Australia
- Language: English
- Budget: A$46,000

Inside Looking Out is a 1977 Australian film directed by Paul Cox. It was his second feature film.

== Plot ==
The marriage of Robert and Elizabeth is collapsing, both concentrating on their jobs (journalist, mother) rather than each other. The film looks at a week in their lives. Robert sleeps with their babysitter, Juliet, while Elizabeth talks with their friends, Marianne and Alex.

== Cast ==
- Briony Behets as Elizabeth
- Tony Llewellyn-Jones as Robert
- Norman Kaye as Alex
- Elke Neidhardt as Marianne
- Juliet Bacskai as Juliet
- Dani Eddy as Dani
- Jean Campbell as neighbour

== Production ==
Cox wanted to make a film that was less autobiographical than his previous work, so brought in a co-writer, Susan Holly-Jones. Tony Llewellyn-Jones and Bernard Eddy also contributed to the shooting script.

The movie was shot over three weeks on 35mm at the beginning of 1977 under the working title Two in the Family. The Creative Development Branch of the Australian Film Commission invested $33,000 with the rest coming from private investment, including Cox and Llewellyn-Jones.

== Release ==
The film screened at the Sydney and Melbourne Film Festivals in June 1977 before receiving a limited release.
