= Dimboola (1973 film) =

1973 Australian TV play

- Directed by: David Williamson; Ross Dimsey; Jack Hibberd
- Written by: Jack Hibberd
- Based on: Dimboola by Jack Hibberd
- Produced by: Ross Dimsey
- Starring: Bruce Spence; Peter Cummins
- Cinematography: Eric Lomas
- Edited by: Tim Lewis
- Music by: Lorraine Milne
- Production companies: Filmcore/A.P.G. Pram Factory Pictures Melbourne
- Release date: 1973
- Country: Australia
- Language: English

Dimboola is a 1973 TV play. It is a filmed recording of a performance of Jack Hibberd's play of the same name by the Australian Performing Group at The Pram Factory in Melbourne.

== Cast ==
- Bruce Spence as Morrie McAdam, the groom
- Fay Mokotow as Reen, the bride
- Wilfred Last as Darkie, the bride's father
- Rosslyn de Winter as June, the bride's mother
- Tim Robertson as Knocka, the groom's father
- Jan Friedl as Florrie, the groom's mother
- Charles Kemp as the Very Reverend Patrick O'Shea
- Robert Meldrum as Leonard Radish, reporter
- Evelyn Krape as Astrid, the flower girl
- Peter Cummins as Horrie McAdam, uncle of the groom
- Jude Kuring as Mavis McAdam, aunt of the groom
- Eileen Chapman as Aggie McAdam, spinster cousin
- Bill Garner as Dangles, the best man
- Kerry Dwyer as Shirl, the bridesmaid
- Jack Charles as Mutton
- Max Gillies as Bayonet

== Production ==
The film was shot during an actual performance at the Pram Factory, Carlton, Melbourne on the evening of 22 May 1973. It was later filmed as a 1979 feature, with Bruce Spence reprising his role as the groom.
