= Serena (actress) =

American former pornographic actress

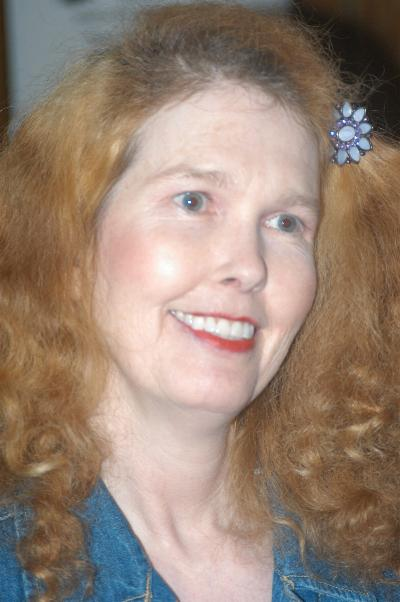
- Serena at the FOXE Awards in Los Angeles, February 2006
- Born: United States
- Other name: Serena Czarnecki
- Occupation: Pornographic film actress
- Website: serenaczarnecki.com

Serena is an American former pornographic film actress.

== Pornographic film career ==
Serena starred in over 110 pornographic films between 1975 and 1988, including Sweet Cakes (1976), Fantasm (1976), Fantasm Comes Again (1977), Sensual Encounters of Every Kind (1978), Honky Tonk Nights (1978), Dracula Sucks (aka Lust At First Bite) (1978), Summertime Blue (1979), Pleasure Palace (1979), Small Town Girls (1979) and Insatiable (1980).

Serena also made Accouplements pour voyeurs (1979), Le Droit de cuissage (1979) and Les Nymphomanes (shot 1979, released 1980) in France, and Glühende Haut (1979) and assorted loops in Germany.

Playboy magazine published an interview with Serena in 1978, together with other "top adult performers". In 1976, she appeared in the film Body of My Enemy, as Frida de Düsseldorf, an amazing stripper. In 1979, she appeared in the film Hardcore in an uncredited role. She has dated Warren Beatty.

Serena was inducted into the XRCO Hall of Fame as a "film pioneer".

== Magazine appearances ==
=== Pictorial ===
- High Society (USA) March 1991, "Porn Star Hall of Fame"
- High Society (USA) May 1986
- The Very Best of High Society (USA) 1986, Vol. 1, Iss. 4, pg. 81–86, "Serena: Brush Strokes"
- Eros Sex Stars (USA) February 1985, Vol. 1, Iss. 5, pg. 23–29, by: The POM Agency, "Her Highness Serena"
- Mr. February (USA) February 1984
- Expose! (USA) September 1983, Vol. 3, Iss. 7, pg. 46–53, by: n/a, "Serena"
- Erotic Film Guide (USA) July 1983, Vol. 1, Iss. 7, pg. 20–25, by: Sneed Hearn, "Serena & Jamie: together again"
- Eros (USA) May 1983
- High Society (USA) April 1983, by: Bruce Kennedy
- Mr. April (USA) April 1983
- High Society (USA) March 1983, by: Don Lau, "What Ever Happened to Serena?"
- Adult Cinema Review (USA) January 1983, Vol. 2, Iss. 7, pg. 38–51, "Serena's Scrapbook: Staying Saucy in Sausalito..."
- Harvey (USA) December 1981
- Velvet Talks (USA) August 1981
- Eros (USA) May 1981
- Playboy (USA) November 1980, Vol. 27, Iss. 11, pg. 180, by: Arthur Knight, "Sex In Cinema 1980"
- Club (USA) August 1980, by: Serge Jacques
- Cinema-X Review (USA) April 1980, Vol. 1, Iss. 4, pg. 49–53, by: Ted Snyder, "Serena"
- Playboy (USA) November 1979, Vol. 26, Iss. 11, pg. 180, by: Arthur Knight, "Sex In Cinema 1979"
- Playboy (USA) December 1978, Vol. 25, Iss. 12, pg. 245, by: Jim Harwood, "Sex Stars Of 1978"
- Mr. November (USA) November 1978
- Playboy (USA) July 1977, Vol. 24, Iss. 7, pg. 136, "The New Girls Of Porn"
- Pix (USA) June 1975, Vol. 1, Iss. 6

=== Cover photos ===
- Erotic Film Guide (USA) July 1983, Vol. 1, Iss. 7
- Eros (USA) May 1983
- Cinema-X Review (USA) April 1980, Vol. 1, Iss. 4
- Pix (USA) June 1975, Vol. 1, Iss. 6
- Beaver Fever (USA) 1975

== Selected publications ==
- Bright Lights, Lonely Nights - The Memories of Serena, Porn Star Pioneer of the 1970s (USA) 2014
- Backstage Girls (USA) 2018
- Poems From Mt. Tam (USA) 2019
- Polk Street (USA) 2021
- Stars In Our Eyes: An Unauthorized Biography (USA) 2021
- Songs Of Silence (USA) 2022

== Personal life ==
Serena lives in the San Francisco Bay Area where she works as a painter, writer, poet, and textile artist.
