= Ross Dimsey =

Australian writer, producer, director and film executive

Ross Dimsey (born 16 October 1943) is an Australian writer, producer, director and film executive.

Born in Melbourne, Dimsey worked in a variety of capacities in the film sector including head of the Victorian Film Corporation in the 1980s and the CEO of Film Queensland in the 1990s.

== Select credits ==
- Stork (1971) - assistant director
- Dimboola (1973) - directed feature version of play that was never released
- Libido (1973) - production manager, assistant director
- Alvin Rides Again (1974) - production manager, assistant director
- End Play (1975) - 2nd unit director, production manager
- Fantasm (1976) - writer
- Fantasm Comes Again (1977) - writer
- Blue Fire Lady (1977) - writer, director
- Final Cut (1980) - director
- Second Time Lucky (1984) - writer
- The Naked Country (1985) - producer, writer
- A Thousand Skies (1985) (mini-serires) - producer
- Kangaroo (1986) - producer, 2nd unit director
- Warm Nights on a Slow Moving Train (1987) - producer
- The Four Minute Mile (1988) (min-series) - executive producer
- Becca (1988) (TV movie) - executive producer
- This Man... This Woman (1989) (mini-series) - producer
- Inside Running (1989) (TV series) - producer
- Darlings of the Gods (1989) (mini series) - producer
- The Great Air Race (1990) (TV movie) - producer
- House Rules (1990) (TV series) - producer

=== Unmade films ===
- Body Count - announced in 1977 from the novel Reservation Cowboys by Forrest Redlich produced by Antony I. Ginnane but never made
