= Ryan (TV series) =

- Created by: Crawford Productions
- Starring: Rod Mullinar; Pamela Stephenson; Luigi Villani; Colin McEwan
- Music by: Garry Hardman
- Country of origin: Australia
- No. of seasons: 1
- No. of episodes: 39

Production
- Executive producer: Terry Stapleton
- Camera setup: Single-camera
- Running time: 60 minutes
- Production company: Crawford Productions

Original release
- Network: Seven Network
- Release: 25 May 1973 – 13 April 1974

Ryan is an Australian adventure television series screened by the Seven Network from 27 May 1973. The series was produced by Crawford Productions and had a run of 39 one-hour episodes.

== Synopsis ==
The series title relates to the character of Michael Ryan, a dashing private investigator played by Rod Mullinar. A few years prior Mullinar had briefly taken the lead role in similar Crawford's series Hunter (1967) in its closing episodes after the original lead actor Tony Ward left the show.

Ryan's secretary Julie King was played by New Zealand-born actor Pamela Stephenson, soon to leave for England and a successful television career. Some storylines were built around the character of Julie. Tony Angelini (Luigi Villani), a taxi driver and Ryan's regular informant and assistant was the third key player in every episode while Detective Cullen (Colin McEwan) was Ryan's main liaison with the police force. When McEwan appeared in an episode, he would be credited as one of the four main cast members.

== Production ==
Ryan was shot entirely on film and in colour with an eye to potential international sales. Hector Crawford told the Sydney Morning Herald that the show was 'probably the most significant breakthrough for us, and for the Australian television industry, since we first produced Homicide eight years ago.' An initial sale of 39 episodes to the Seven Network recouped only 55% of the series' relatively high production costs. An international sale was therefore crucial to the show's continued feasibility.

Australian television was still in the process of transitioning to colour broadcasting in 1973, while key international markets were already in colour and would more readily purchase a colour series. Though many Australian series shot their interior scenes on videotape in the studio using a multiple-camera setup with only outdoor scenes shot on film, many television studios were not yet equipped with colour equipment. This meant Ryan had to be shot entirely on film. In another concession to international marketability Mullinar was instructed to play the role using a Mid-Atlantic American accent.

One of Crawfords' directors, David Lee, designed a gun, in collaboration with Melbourne CIB ballistics, specifically for Mullinar to use in the show: 'a Colt with a 4-inch barrel.'

== Broadcast ==
=== Locally ===
Ryan premiered in May 1973, rating well in Brisbane and Adelaide, but failing in the crucial Melbourne and Sydney markets. A key reason for low ratings was that the Nine Network had moved the highly popular police drama Division 4 to a new night to compete with the much-hyped new series. Ryan was moved around the schedules in order to find an audience, but ratings remained mediocre. After the initial 39 episodes were in the can the Ryan crew were, in expectation of a second series, retained by Crawfords and put to work on Homicide - whose output was increased to two episodes a week - on that show's second weekly episode. This resulted in one cross-over episode, with the Ryan regular characters appearing in an episode of Homicide with the exception of Pamela Stephenson, who had opted to leave the series during the recess. Ultimately Ryan was not renewed by the Seven Network due to insufficient ratings. The Homicide production reverted to one episode a week. While some of the crew were rolled into the new Crawfords serial The Box. However, that show featured little outdoors filming so inevitably some of the Ryan crew were retrenched - the first time Crawfords had ever retrenched staff.

=== Internationally ===
Ryan debuted in Canada in September 1975, in the US eleven days later on 27 September 1975 and in the UK on the 6 July 1976.

== Cast ==
=== Main ===
- Rod Mullinar as Michael Ryan
- Pamela Stephenson as Julie King
- Luigi Villani as Tony Angelini
- Colin McEwan as Detective Sergeant Dan Cullen

== Episodes ==
No. overall	No. in season	Title	Directed by	Written by	Original release date
1	1	"Liz"	Simon Wincer	Morton S. Fine; Terry Stapleton	25 May 1973
2	2	"This Little Piggy Went to Pieces"	Andrew Swanson	Peter Schreck	1 June 1973
3	3	"Firing Squad"	Gary Conway	Colin Eggleston	8 June 1973
4	4	"Nut File"	Gary Conway	Neil Atkinson; Terry Stapleton	15 June 1973
5	5	"King's Bishop to Queen Three"	Gary Conway	Peter Schreck	22 June 1973
6	6	"Catalyst"	Gary Conway	Ron McLean	29 June 1973
7	7	"Death Watch"	Ian Bennett	Phil Freedman	6 July 1973
8	8	"Come the Liberation"	Simon Wincer	William Froug	13 July 1973
9	9	"Messenger Birds"	Ian Crawford; Andrew Swanson	James Wulf Simmonds	20 July 1973
10	10	"Tribe"	Simon Wincer	Dennis Paul; Peter Schreck	27 July 1973
11	11	"The Girl with the Golden Slippers"	Simon Wincer	David Boutland	3 August 1973
12	12	"Miss Ogilvie Repents"	Andrew Swanson	Dennis Paul	10 August 1973
13	13	"Man with a Mission"	Simon Wincer	James Wulf Simmonds	17 August 1973
14	14	"But When She Was Bad"	Gary Conway	David Boutland	24 August 1973
15	15	"Moon Monkey"	Gary Conway	Everett De Roche	31 August 1973
16	16	"Nobody's Perfect"	Ian Bennett	José Luis Bayonas	8 September 1973
17	17	"Person or Persons Unknown"	David Johnstone	David Boutland	15 September 1973
18	18	"Fibber the Dancing Galah"	Simon Wincer	Everett De Roche	22 September 1973
19	19	"Hamlet's Horse"	Simon Wincer	Dennis Paul	29 September 1973
20	20	"Where Thunder Sleeps"	Simon Wincer	Ian Jones	6 October 1973
21	21	"The Far Away Girl"	Simon Wincer	John Blair	13 October 1973
22	22	"Hickory Dickory Dock"	Ian Bennett	José Luis Bayonas	20 October 1973
23	23	"Pipeline"	Gary Conway	Michael Harvey	27 October 1973
24	24	"Three-Legged Duck"	Gary Conway	Everett De Roche	3 November 1973
25	25	"A Bag Full of Miracles"	Ian Bennett	José Luis Bayonas	10 November 1973
26	26	"Giant, Giant Had a Great Fall"	Simon Wincer	Neil Atkinson	17 November 1973
27	27	"Way Back"	Simon Wincer	Terry Stapleton	24 November 1973
28	28	"Negative Proof"	Gary Conway	John Edwards	1 December 1973
29	29	"A Little Something Special"	George Miller	William Froug	8 December 1973
30	30	"Red Alert"	Ian Bennett	John Blair	15 December 1973
31	31	"A Deep Dark Place"	Gary Conway	David Boutland	25 January 1974
32	32	"A Song for Julie"	Ian Bennett	Everett De Roche	1 February 1974
33	33	"The Man in Room 16"	Andrew Swanson	Ian Jones	18 February 1974
34	34	"Give Them the World"	Simon Wincer	David Boutland	2 March 1974
35	35	"Wild About Harry"	Simon Wincer	Ian Jones	9 March 1974
36	36	"King Hit"	Gary Conway	José Luis Bayonas	16 March 1974
37	37	"Goodbye Holly Beckett"	Ian Bennett	John Blair; Terry Stapleton	23 March 1974
38	38	"There's Going to Be a War"	Gary Conway	David Boutland	30 March 1974
39	39	"A Funny Thing Happened on the Way to the Altar"	Gary Conway	Neil Atkinson; Terry Stapleton	13 April 1974

== DVD release ==
The complete series was released on DVD in June 2018. It and other Crawford Productions series are available to international viewers from Eaton Films in the UK and Australia and New Zealand based buyers from Crawfords DVD. As well as the full run of 39 episodes, the DVD set includes the Homicide crossover episode "As Simple As ABZ".

Title	Format	Ep #	Discs	Region 2 (UK)	Region 4 (Australia)	Special features	Distributors
Ryan (Complete Collection)	DVD	39	10	June 2018	June 2018	HOMICIDE - Episode 408 featuring Ryan	Crawford Productions
