= Tim Elston =

Australian actor

Tim Elston is an Australian actor.

He was known for his acting roles on television as Detective Mitchell in Bellamy, Doctor Scott Collins in Prisoner and police sergeant Warren Bryant in Richmond Hill.
