= Sky Pirates =

- US home video poster
- Directed by: Colin Eggleston
- Written by: John D. Lamond
- Produced by: Michael Hirsh; John D. Lamond
- Starring: John Hargreaves; Meredith Phillips; Max Phipps
- Cinematography: Garry Wapshott
- Edited by: Michael Hirsh; John D. Lamond
- Music by: Brian May
- Production company: John Lamond Motion Pictures
- Distributed by: Roadshow Entertainment
- Release date: 16 January 1986
- Running time: 89 minutes
- Country: Australia
- Language: English
- Budget: AU$4.2 million
- Box office: AU $76,170 (Australia)

Sky Pirates (also known as Dakota Harris) is a 1986 Australian adventure film written and produced by John D. Lamond, and directed by Colin Eggleston. The film was inspired by Steven Spielberg's Raiders of the Lost Ark (1981), as well as borrowing liberally from The Philadelphia Experiment (1984), The Deer Hunter (1978), Dirty Harry (1971) and Mad Max (1979).

== Plot ==
In 1945, the Second World War is about to come to an end. Meanwhile, the Australian military has come across an ancient device which can be used to travel through time. It is imperative that the Allies have it and the Axis powers do not.

The experienced aviator lieutenant Harris gets assigned to transport the precious item to Washington, D.C. Reverend Mitchell, General Hackett and Major Savage are aboard the Douglas C-47 Skytrain transport. During the flight the power of the magic cargo makes the laws of nature fade, thereby causing a tremendous tempest which leaves Harris no other choice than to ditch the aircraft.

In rescue boats they discover a weird and misty area full of wrecked ships of different eras. Rev. Mitchell claims there was a connection to the so-called Philadelphia Experiment. Harris remains unimpressed and concentrates on the survival of his crew, even for the price of immolating the arcane freight against Savage's explicit orders.

Back home Savage has Harris sentenced for insubordination by a military court. Harris escapes and seeks to unveil the background of these occurrences. He beseeches Rev. Mitchell's daughter Melanie to team up with him. Together they strive to retrieve the lost magic item. They disclose and confound Savage's hidden agenda before they become a happy couple.

== Cast ==
- John Hargreaves as Lieutenant Harris
- Meredith Phillips as Melanie Mitchell
- Max Phipps as Major Savage
- Bill Hunter as O'Reilly
- Simon Chilvers as Rev. Mitchell
- Alex Scott as Gen. Hackett
- Adrian Wright as Valentine
- Peter Cummins as Col. Brien
- Tommy Dysart as Bartender
- Arron Wayne Cull (as Wayne Cull) as Logan
- Alex Menglet as Sullivan
- Nigel Bradshaw as Spencer
- Chris Gregory as Appleton
- John Murphy as Gus

== Production ==
Sky Pirates was able to utilise a number of warbirds that were found in Australia including CAC Mustangs, Douglas C-47 Skytrains, Grumman Mallards and North American B-25 Mitchells. Principal photography took place in Australia from May to June 1984. (Note: The second Douglas C-47DL (c/n 6051, s/n 41-38668), registered VH-DAS, that appeared in the film was actually submerged.)

== Soundtrack ==
The music in Sky Pirates was composed by Brian May, who also scored the first two Mad Max films. The soundtrack was produced, edited and mastered by Philip Powers four years later as part of his Australian film music archive project on the label oneMone Records. Sky Pirates: Original Soundtrack Recording was released on CD in 1989.

== Reception ==
Aviation film historian Simon Beck in The Aircraft Spotter's Film and Television Companion (2016) described Sky Pirates as "influenced by every Spielberg production made up to the mid-'80s."

Eleanor Mannikka in her review for AllMovie.com noted "A limp storyline refuses to go taut throughout this sci-fi adventure that patches together bits and pieces from its famous, multi-genre predecessors (the Indiana Jones series, The Deer Hunter, The Philadelphia Experiment, and others)".

Film historian Leonard Maltin, in Leonard Maltin's Movie Guide 2013 (2012), derided the "assorted nonsense" of Sky Pirates "Boring and confusing, but Hargreaves earns an A for effort."

Filmink magazine wrote "There's enough genuinely good stuff in here (Hargreaves, Max Phipps, Brian May's music score, Easter Island filming) to make you wish John Lamond had just stuck to producing and gotten in a writer to give it some shape."
