= Body Business =

- Based on: idea by John Michael Howson
- Written by: Michael Fisher; Ted Roberts
- Directed by: Colin Eggleston
- Starring: Carmen Duncan; Gary Sweet; Max Phipps
- Country of origin: Australia
- Original language: English

Production
- Producer: Stanley Walsh
- Running time: 2 x 2 hours
- Production company: PBL Productions
- Budget: $3 million

Original release
- Network: Nine Network
- Release: 9 May 1986

Body Business is a 1986 Australian TV mini-series directed by Colin Eggleston set against the background of the world of modelling.

== Premise ==
After nine years in New York, Patricia returns to Sydney to take control of the family company from her sister Victoria.

== Cast ==
- Jane Menelaus as Victoria
- Carmen Duncan as Cassie Fairchild
- Gary Day as Nick Christopher
- Gary Sweet as Brian Doyle
- Trisha Noble as Elisabeth
- Max Phipps as Max
- Mercia Deane-Johns as Judy
- Beth Buchanan as C
- Georgie Parker as Model in commercial
- Kelley Abbey as Dancer
