= Patrick (1978 film) =

- Theatrical release poster
- Directed by: Richard Franklin
- Screenplay by: Everett De Roche
- Produced by: Antony I. Ginnane; Richard Franklin
- Starring: Susan Penhaligon; Robert Helpmann; Rod Mullinar; Bruce Barry; Julia Blake; Helen Hemingway; María Mercedes; Walter Pym; Frank Wilson
- Cinematography: Donald McAlpine
- Edited by: Edward McQueen-Mason
- Music by: Brian May; Goblin (Italian Version)
- Production companies: Filmways Australasian Distributors; Australian International Film Corporation; Australian Film Commission; Victorian Film Corporation
- Distributed by: Filmways Australasian Distributors
- Release date: 1 October 1978 (Australia)
- Running time: 110 minutes
- Country: Australia
- Language: English
- Budget: $400,000

Patrick is a 1978 Australian science fiction horror film directed by Richard Franklin and written by Everett De Roche. The film popularized Ozploitation films in other territories. A remake was released in 2013.

== Plot ==
Three years after murdering his parents, Patrick (Thompson) lies in a coma at the Roget Clinic, a private hospital in Melbourne. Following a job interview with Matron Cassidy (Blake), the head of the hospital, Kathy Jacquard (Penhaligon) is taken on as Patrick's new nurse. The hospital's owner, Dr. Roget (Helpmann), explains Patrick's condition to Kathy and says he is being kept alive to explore the nature of life and death. He also says that another patient, Capt. Fraser (Pym), claims that Patrick "flies in and out of the window at night." Elsewhere, Kathy deals with her ex-husband Ed (Mullinar), from whom she recently separated.

Unbeknownst to the hospital staff, Patrick has psychokinetic powers and has the ability to travel out of his body. He demonstrates his ability by moving objects in Cassidy's presence and attempting to drown Brian Wright (Barry), a doctor who flirts with Kathy, at a pool party. When Kathy tries typing a memo in Patrick's room, he takes over her movements and causes her to write his name. Patrick seems to begin communicating with Kathy via spitting, but remains silent when she brings in Cassidy to show her. However, after Cassidy leaves the room, Kathy discovers that Patrick has written "SECRET" through the typewriter.

Kathy and Brian return to her apartment to find it ransacked. Kathy assumes Ed is responsible, but he denies any wrongdoing. Patrick again tries to communicate with Kathy, showing her which parts of his body he can feel; he sports an erection when she reaches his genitals. Cassidy catches Kathy but, while not sacking her, warns her to not entertain theories about Patrick's consciousness as she continues caring for him. Kathy returns to her apartment to find that Ed has cleaned up the mess and fixed her dinner. Ed handles a hot casserole dish and severely burns his hands, but says he didn't feel a thing.

One night, Patrick possesses Kathy while she is typing and uses her to communicate a lewd and threatening message. He also takes over the typewriter to write an algebra equation she doesn't recognize. Meanwhile, Ed drops by the hospital with a bouquet and is lured into the broken lift by Patrick, who traps him inside. Kathy realizes Patrick has psychic powers, but Brian is reluctant to take her claims seriously. When Brian makes an inquiry about examining Patrick, Cassidy sacks Kathy. After Roget subjects Patrick to electroconvulsive therapy, he uses the typewriter to tell Kathy that the hospital staff is trying to kill him.

Kathy and Brian sneak into the hospital at night to examine Patrick. While this happens, Patrick compels Cassidy to return to the hospital, but she relents in opening the door to his room while they subject him to strobe lights. After the two leave, Patrick possesses Cassidy and causes her to fatally electrocute herself in the basement, then turns his head to look at a frightened nurse. Kathy is questioned about the blackout and is present when Cassidy's body is discovered. She persuades the investigating officer, Detective Sergeant Grant (Wilson), to speak to Brian about Patrick's abilities, but both men dismiss her claims that Patrick murdered the matron.

Kathy realizes Ed is missing. She contacts Grant, who tells her that Ed's car was towed from outside the hospital. Meanwhile, Patrick uses his powers to attack Roget when he attempts to inject him with potassium chloride. Kathy confronts Patrick, who gives her the choice of either injecting him with the syringe or letting Ed die. Kathy reluctantly chooses to kill Patrick, who nearly causes her to take the syringe as well. Ed, who is released from the lift, arrives in the room and saves her at the last minute. Despite apparently flatlining, Patrick leaps from his bed and crashes into a cabinet in what Roget assumes is a motor reflex. However, after Kathy closes Patrick's eyes and leaves the room, he awakens again.

== Cast ==
- Susan Penhaligon as Kathie Jacquard
- Robert Helpmann as Dr. Roget
- Rod Mullinar as Ed Jacquard
- Robert Thompson as Patrick
- Bruce Barry as Dr. Brian Wright
- Julia Blake as Matron Cassidy
- Helen Hemingway as Sister Williams
- María Mercedes as Nurse Panicale
- Walter Pym as Capt. Fraser
- Frank Wilson as Det. Sgt. Grant
- John P. Boddie as the Multi-Colored Mice
- Martin Copping as Baby in Hospital (uncredited)

== Production ==
This was the second script Everett de Roche had ever written, following Long Weekend (1978). It had been around for a number of years before director Richard Franklin became attached. The two men had both worked for Crawford Productions although not together until then. De Roche says when Franklin became involved the script was "a rambling 250 pages" and Franklin taught him the elements of drama and suspense. He says the final scene of Patrick leaping out of his bed was inspired by trip to a carnival Franklin had made where a man in a gorilla suit burst out into the audience, causing everyone to scream. They then started working backwards from this scene.

Franklin brought in Antony I. Ginnane who raised finance. The Australian Film Commission and Victorian Film Corporation contributed about half the budget, with the rest obtained privately. Ginnane later said he thought De Roche's script was one of the best ever written in Australia.

Judy Morris was originally announced as star. However British film actor Susan Penhaligon was imported to play the lead, which Ginnane thought helped secure the film a sale in Britain.

Richard Franklin later recalled:

I'd done Eskimo Nell in the Australian idiom, and... my [American] friends didn't understand it. So I thought, well, I'll go to the other extreme and have everybody speaking Queen's English. And so I had everybody doing, not so much English accents as just speaking Queen's English.

Robert Helpmann broke his back during filming trying to lift up Robert Thompson in one scene.

=== Music ===
The musical score for Patrick was composed and conducted by Australian composer Brian May, who previously composed the music for Franklin's The True Story of Eskimo Nell and was produced by Philip Powers for release on CD with a few short cues of additional music not on the initial LP album. In Italy, the film was re-scored by progressive rock band Goblin.

== Reception ==
The film was considered a disappointment at the Australian box office but was highly successful internationally, selling to over 30 countries and performing well in the US. On the review aggregator website Rotten Tomatoes, 42% of 12 critics' reviews are positive, with an average rating of 5.50/10.

The Encyclopedia of Fantasy notes the similarity between the film's plot and that of the novel Tetrasomy Two by Oscar Rossiter (nom de plume of Dr. Vernon H.Skeels (1918-2007) ).

Franklin says he would refer to this film as "my first film. Even though there were one and a half films before it." However, he was unhappy with the American release of the film which was re-dubbed into American accents and recut.

Filmmaker Quentin Tarantino is a fan and borrowed from Patrick for a scene in Kill Bill where the bride is in her coma and spits on the orderly, mimicking Patrick. He relates the story in Mark Hartley's documentary Not Quite Hollywood.

=== Accolades ===
Award	Category	Subject	Result
AACTA Award (1978 Australian Film Institute Awards)	Best Film	Richard Franklin	Nominated
AACTA Award (1978 Australian Film Institute Awards)	Best Film	Antony I. Ginnane	Nominated
AACTA Award (1978 Australian Film Institute Awards)	Best Original Screenplay	Everett De Roche	Nominated
AACTA Award (1978 Australian Film Institute Awards)	Best Editing	Edward McQueen-Mason	Nominated
Avoriaz Fantastic Film Festival	Grand Prize	Richard Franklin	Won
Sitges Fantasy Film Festival Prize	Best Director	Richard Franklin	Won
Saturn Award	Best Foreign Film		Nominated

== Legacy ==
=== Sequel ===
In 1980, an unauthorized sequel entitled Patrick vive ancora (released in English as Patrick Still Lives and Patrick Is Still Alive) was released. The film followed a young boy named Patrick that was sent into a coma after a roadside accident. The film was billed as and is sometimes referred to as a direct sequel to the events of the 1978 film, but aside from the name and premise of a comatose person with psychic powers, the sequel is unrelated to the earlier film.

=== Remake ===
In February 2010, director Mark Hartley announced his intent to direct a remake of the 1978 film. The film, Patrick, was released on 27 July 2013 at the Melbourne International Film Festival and stars Jackson Gallagher as the titular Patrick. The film received positive reviews.

== See also ==
- Cinema of Australia
- The Medusa Touch a 1978 film starring Richard Burton.
