= Long Weekend (1978 film) =

1978 Australian psychological thriller film by Colin Eggleston

- Theatrical film poster
- Directed by: Colin Eggleston
- Screenplay by: Everett De Roche
- Produced by: Colin Eggleston
- Starring: John Hargreaves; Briony Behets
- Cinematography: Vincent Monton
- Edited by: Brian Kavanagh
- Music by: Michael Carlos
- Production company: Dugong Films
- Distributed by: Hoyts Distribution
- Release date: October 1978 (Sitges Film Festival)
- Running time: 92 minutes
- Country: Australia
- Language: English
- Budget: AU$425,000 or $270,000

Long Weekend is an Australian psychological thriller film shot in 1977 and first shown in 1978. The film was directed by Colin Eggleston and stars John Hargreaves and Briony Behets.

== Plot ==
Peter and Marcia, along with their dog Cricket, go for a weekend camping trip to a secluded beach. There is tension between the couple, and it appears that each may have a lover. Marcia is not keen on taking this trip but does so grudgingly. On the way there, Peter's discarded cigarette butt ignites a small fire, and he accidentally runs over and kills a kangaroo.

Once they have arrived and set up camp at the edge of a wooded area near the beach, the couple cause more environmental damage, including the theft and destruction of an eagle's egg, the killing of a dugong, what appears to be the killing of a throng of birds, and the needless partial chopping of trees.

Peter and Marcia bicker, and it is revealed that a crucial source of mutual resentment is an abortion she had following an affair with another man. As tensions rise between the self-absorbed and environmentally toxic couple, nature starts to strike back: first by an eagle and possum attacking Peter, and then through more insidious means. Marcia, desperate to get away, steals Peter's car and leaves him alone with night drawing in. Peter arms himself with a spear-gun which he fires blindly at a noise during his troubled night.

The next morning, Peter sees Marcia's dead body impaled by the spear, and finds his car abandoned in what appears to be a mesh of spider webs. He drives away, but eventually has to ditch the car when it gets stuck in mud. Peter stumbles upon the main road after hours of searching. He steps out to wave down a truck. But a sulphur-crested cockatoo attacks its driver, causing him to lose control, and the truck hits and kills Peter.

== Cast ==
- John Hargreaves – Peter
- Briony Behets – Marcia
- Mike McEwen – Truck Driver
- Roy Day – Old Man
- Michael Aitkens – Bartender
- Sue Kiss von Soly – City girl
- Lee Streater - Surfing Peter

== Production ==
The script was the first feature script written by Everett De Roche, an experienced Australian TV writer. He was inspired by a trip he took on an Easter weekend to an isolated beach in New South Wales:

I started LW as a way to avoid the TV-cop-show doldrums while still convincing myself I was "working". LW was a unique project because I began with no outline, no notes or research, very little idea as to where the story was going, and absolutely zero knowledge of screenplays. I simply started at page 1, scene 1, and made it up as I went. I had only a vague plan to write a kind of environmental horror story. My premise was that Mother Earth has her own auto-immune system, so when humans start behaving like cancer cells, She attacks. I also wanted to avoid a JAWS-like critter film. I wanted the LW beasties to all be benign-looking and not overtly aggressive.

De Roche wrote the script in ten days. He showed it to Colin Eggleston, who had worked with him at Crawfords, and Eggleston decided to make the movie. Funds were obtained from Film Victoria and the Australian Film Commission.

Shooting took place in March–April 1977 in Melbourne and near Bega in south-east New South Wales. A second unit in Tasmania captured scenes with Tasmanian devils and tiger quolls. The ending was originally different according to De Roche:

I wrote an enormously complicated sequence for near the end where the animals give Peter a second chance. They want him to wise up, and he is at the point of doing so when he hears a truck in the distance. He dashes off to the highway, and the animals decide there is no hope. Poetically, they leave it to another man to kill him.

However, this scene was too difficult to shoot because it involved animals and was cut.

== Release ==
The film premiered at the Sitges Film Festival in October 1978.

The film tied with Invasion of the Body Snatchers to win the Antennae II Award at the Avoriaz Fantastic Film Festival, won the Special Jury Award at 1978's Paris Film Festival and won Best Film, Prize of the International Critics' Jury for director Eggleston and Best Actor for Hargreaves.

It was not released theatrically in Australia until 1979, and was a commercial disappointment.

== Critical reception ==
AllMovie wrote, "Long Weekend is little more than an extended cautionary tale about the karmic foolishness of disrespecting nature. DVD Times praised the film, and also commented on its obscurity: "when an obviously well made and executed little thriller comes along, an exercise in controlled dread and eerie atmosphere that's really effective, you have to ponder the reasons why the vast majority passed on it. Early Australian cinema seems cursed in this category."

De Roche later expressed some dissatisfaction with the film:

Unfortunately, the bush comes across as a threat too early; it should have emerged as a threat only after the audience had sympathized with the animals. And I don’t think that sympathy is there. Long Weekend would have been much better if the audience had been told at the beginning that Peter and Marcia were going to die. This way, it wouldn’t have had to sympathize with them, and could have concerned itself solely with when this was going to happen. Such is the essence of suspense.

== Remake ==
In 2008, Australian director Jamie Blanks shot a remake of the film (alternately titled Nature's Grave). The film starred James Caviezel and Claudia Karvan.

== See also ==
- Cinema of Australia
