= Innocent Prey =

1991 Australian thriller film

- VHS artwork
- Directed by: Colin Eggleston
- Screenplay by: Ron McLean
- Story by: Colin Eggleston
- Produced by: Colin Eggleston
- Starring: P. J. Soles; Martin Balsam; Kit Taylor
- Cinematography: Vincent Monton
- Edited by: Pippa Anderson
- Music by: Brian May
- Production companies: Crystal Film Corporation; Premiere Pictures Corporation
- Distributed by: Intermedia Video
- Release date: 9 August 1991
- Running time: 86 minutes
- Country: Australia
- Language: English

Innocent Prey is a 1984 Australian slasher film directed by Colin Eggleston and starring P. J. Soles, Kit Taylor, and Grigor Taylor. It follows a woman in Dallas who is stalked by her former husband, a serial killer, after his escape from a psychiatric hospital. Though made in 1983, the film went unreleased in the United States until 1991.

== Plot ==
Cathy Willis, a Dallas businesswoman, welcomes her Australian friend, Gwen, who is on a brief layover while en route to her home in Sydney. That night, Cathy and Gwen have dinner together before Cathy drives Gwen back to the airport. Meanwhile Cathy's husband Joe is threatened by his investors over a fraudulent business deal. An enraged Joe visits a local bar where he propositions a prostitute for sex. Cathy tracks Joe to a nearby motel where, through a window, she witnesses him murder the prostitute with a straight razor. Cathy reports the crime to the police and Joe is committed to a psychiatric hospital.

Cathy puts her house up for sale with plans to relocate to Australia. One night, she learns that Joe has escaped from the psychiatric hospital; Joe arrives at the house and attacks her, but flees when police arrive. A police officer, Casey, is appointed to protect Cathy until Joe is apprehended, but Joe returns to the house that night and kills the officer, decapitating her. Cathy is saved by Sheriff Virgil Baker, but Joe manages to evade police.

Desperate for safety, Cathy flies from Dallas to Sydney. She moves into Gwen's home, a spacious Victorian property owned by the wealthy Phillip, who resides in a nearby guesthouse. Unbeknownst to the Gwen and Cathy, Phillip is a voyeur who spies on the daily goings-on in the residence via a network of covert security cameras. Phillip takes a liking to Cathy, and is jealous when Cathy begins dating Rick, a friend of Gwen's.

Back in the United States, a crazed Joe makes his way to San Francisco where he fakes his death and assumes a new identity before flying to Sydney, intending to kill Cathy. Meanwhile, Gwen apparently goes on a two-week trip away; Rick and Cathy are told by Phillip that he drove Gwen to the airport. Shortly after, Cathy learns she is pregnant with Joe's baby.

Later that night, while Cathy and Rick go out for dinner, Phillip witnesses Joe enter the house via the security cameras. When Cathy returns home, she is shocked to find Joe's corpse. After police remove the body, Phillip watches jealously from the cameras as Cathy and Phillip spend the night together. The next day, Cathy invites Phillip to join her and Rick for dinner. Before the dinner, Phillip lures Rick inside his surveillance room and locks him inside, affixing a high electric charge to the metal door, preventing Rick from leaving. On a video tape, Rick watches a snuff film Phillip made in which he electrocuted Gwen to death in the swimming pool.

Rick views the live cameras in the house, and witnesses Phillip telling Cathy that Rick is running late. Phillip and Cathy proceed to have dinner in Rick's absence, during which Phillip reveals his psychotic tendencies and obsession with Cathy, before admitting to having murdered Joe. At the same time, Ted, another friend of Cathy and Gwen, arrives but is unaware that the door he's about to open is rigged to electrocute anyone who touches it and is killed as a result. Meanwhile, Rick manages to escape from the surveillance room, but is significantly injured by the electric shock of the door. Phillip corners Cathy, but Rick saves her by pushing him over a balcony to his death.

Later, Cathy goes to retrieve Rick from the hospital after his recovery. As they prepare to leave, Rick is seen brandishing a straight razor, which he places in his bag.

== Cast ==
- P. J. Soles as Cathy Wills
- Kit Taylor as Joe
- Grigor Taylor as Rick
- John Warnock as Phillip
- Susan Stenmark as Gwen
- Richard Morgan as Ted
- Martin Balsam as Sheriff Virgil Baker
- Debi Sue Voorhees as a hooker

== Production ==
The film was shot in the summer of 1983 in Sydney, Australia and Dallas, Texas, under the title of Voyeur. Some filming took place at the Dallas Communications Center in Las Colinas, Texas.

It was the last credit for prolific Australian writer Ron McLean.

== Release ==
Innocent Prey was not released until 9 August 1991 when it was given a VHS release in the United States by Intermedia Video.

== Sources ==
- Murray, Scott, ed. (1996). Australia on the Small Screen 1970-1995. Oxford, England: Oxford University Press. ISBN 978-0-195-53949-3.
- Shelley, Peter (2012). Australian Horror Films, 1973-2010. Jefferson, North Carolina: McFarland & Company. ISBN 978-0-786-46167-7.
- Stratton, David (1990). The Avocado Plantation: Boom and Bust in the Australian Film Industry. Sydney, Australia: Pan Macmillan. ISBN 978-0-732-90250-6.
