= This Man... This Woman =

- Genre: Miniseries
- Written by: Terry Stapleton
- Directed by: Paul Moloney
- Starring: Robert Coleby; Catherine Wilkin; Tina Bursill; Ben Mendelsohn; Rachael Beck
- Country of origin: Australia
- Original language: English
- No. of episodes: 4

Production
- Producer: Graham Moore
- Editor: Ken Tyler
- Camera setup: Clive Sell
- Running time: 4 x 50 minutes

Original release
- Network: ABC
- Release: 24 May – 25 May 1989

This Man... This Woman is a 1989 miniseries about a man who loses his job and has an affair.

== Synopsis ==
Neil and Marion Clarke are a wealthy couple with a happy family, who seem to have it all. Then Neil is retrenched and they hit crisis mode as they are forced to navigate their changing relationship.

== Cast ==
- Robert Coleby as Neil Clarke
- Catherine Wilkin as Marion Clarke
- Tina Bursill as Liz Maddocks
- Ben Mendelsohn as Matthew Clarke
- Rachael Beck as Susan Clarke
- Andrew Ferguson as Danny Clarke
- Lucy Bayler as Kathy Robinson
- Max Phipps as Barry Farmer
- Ruth Yaffe as Betty
- Gabriella Clark as Veronica
- Helen Francis as Judy
- Suzanne Warner as Belinda
- John Gregg as Joe Laurence
- Warwick Moss as Ray
- Patsy Martin as Mrs Braithwaite
- Janet Andrewartha as Pat
- Ernie Grey as Dr Simmonds
- Alethea McGrath as Sheila
- Irini Pappas as Anna-Maria
- Richard Moss as Peter Goddard
- Andrew Spence as Warren Lang

== Production ==
The miniseries was produced by Crawford Productions and Australian Broadcasting Corporation.

== Release ==
The production was first televised in May 1989.

== Awards ==
The series won an award for Best Lighting (Clive Sell) and shared an award for Best Music (Peter Sullivan), both with the Television Society of Australia in 1989.
