= Mario Andreacchio =

Australian film producer/director

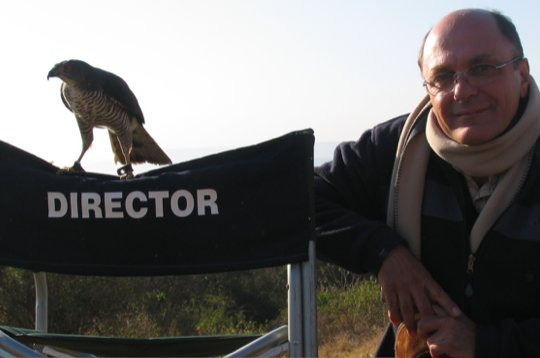
- Andreacchio on set in South Africa
- Born: Leigh Creek, South Australia, Australia
- Occupation(s): Film director, writer, producer

Mario Andreacchio is an Australian film producer/director.

== Early life and education ==
Mario Andreacchio was born in Leigh Creek, South Australia to Italian parents.

He graduated from Flinders University with a degree in Psychology and went on to train as a director at the Australian Film and Television School.

== Career ==
Andreacchio has directed feature films, television specials, telemovies, children's mini-series, and documentaries.

In 1988, he won an International Emmy Award in the Children and Young People category for Captain Johnno, an episode of the 1988 Touch the Sun TV series.

In 2007 Andreacchio founded a film production company, AMPCO Films Pty Ltd (Adelaide Motion Picture Company), based in the Adelaide suburb of Norwood. As of August 2024 the company is still registered. In 2008, AMPCO, Hong Kong company Salon Films, and Zhejiang Hengdian in China announced an agreement to co-produce three films at the Hengdian World Studios.

== Other activities ==
He has served on the boards of the Australian Film Finance Corporation and the South Australian Film Corporation.

== Partial filmography ==
- Fair Game (1986)
- The Dreaming (1988)
- Captain Johnno (1988)
- Sky Trackers (1994)
- Napoleon (1995)
- The Real Macaw (1998)
- Sally Marshall Is Not an Alien (1999)
- Young Blades (2001)
- Paradise Found (2003)
- Elephant Tales (2005)
- The Dragon Pearl (2011)
