= Sally Marshall Is Not an Alien =

- Directed by: Mario Andreacchio
- Written by: Robert Geoffrion
- Based on: Novel by Amanda McKay
- Produced by: Terry J. Charatsis; Micheline Charest
- Starring: Natalie Vansier
- Cinematography: Tony Clark
- Edited by: Jean-Marie Drot
- Music by: Christopher Dedrick
- Production companies: CINAR Corporation; Film Tonic
- Distributed by: United International Pictures
- Release date: 1 July 1999
- Running time: 90 minutes
- Country: Australia
- Language: English
- Box office: A$1,291,802 (Australia)

Sally Marshall Is Not an Alien is a 1999 family drama film starring Helen Neville, Natalie Vansier, and Thea Gumbert. It was released on July 1, 1999, in Australia.

== Plot ==
Pip Lawson, a space-obsessed 12-year-old, makes a bet with a local bully, Rhonnie Bronston, to prove that the Marshalls, an oddball family moving into the neighborhood, are not aliens. With her telescope on the line, Pip befriends her new neighbor, Sally Marshall, and works to win the bet.

As Sally becomes the new target for Rhonnie and her gang of friends, Pip quits the bet, still maintaining her original position. After reaffirming their friendship, Sally reveals that she and the rest of her family are, in fact, aliens. They leave Earth in a UFO as Pip watches on. The telescope is returned, and Pip becomes friends with the former bully and the other neighborhood children.

== Cast ==
- Helen Neville as Pip Lawson
- Natalie Vansier as Sally Marshall
- Thea Gumbert as Rhonnie Bronston
- Glenn McMillian as Ben Handleman
- Lachlan Hodgson as Nick Jessop
- Vince Poletto as Wayne Marshall
- Melissa Jafer as Granny Marshall
- Mac Teedie as Mr.Marshall
- Peter O'Brien as David Lawson
- Paul Gordon

== Reception ==
In David Stratton's Variety review he wrote: "A cautionary tale about the importance of welcoming strangers into your community, Sally Marshall Is Not An Alien rams home its timeless message. Aimed at a niche audience of prepubescent females, pic has opened across Australia for the school holidays, but modest results are to be expected. Down the track, however, it could become a perennial video attraction for its target audience."
