= Everett De Roche =

American screenwriter

- Born: 1946; Lincoln, Maine, United States
- Died: 2014 (aged 67–68)
- Occupation: Screenwriter
- Known for: Thrillers, horror

Everett De Roche (1946–2014) was an American-Australian screenwriter who worked extensively in the Australian film and TV industry. He was best known for his work in the thriller and horror genre, with such credits as Long Weekend, Patrick, and Roadgames.

== Early life ==
De Roche was born in Lincoln, Maine, and moved to San Diego with his family when he was six. De Roche emigrated to Australia with his wife when he was 22 in 1968, and worked as a journalist for the Queensland Health Education Council.

== Career ==
De Roche wanted to be a writer and wrote a spec script for Division Four. Nine months later he received a telegram inviting him to write for the show. From 1970-74 he was a staff writer at Crawford Productions, mainly working on police shows, then he freelanced.

In the late 70s and early 80s he established himself as the leading screenwriter of thrillers in Australia.

He often worked with director Richard Franklin who said of him:

Everett is a very inspirational writer... Everett gives one too much of everything and you don’t always know what to use. You start editing down and you end up with words and single lines of dialogue that were once scenes. That is maybe how this problem, as you see it, comes about. But that only has to do with Everett’s extraordinarily fertile imagination and his writing speed.

== Death ==
De Roche had cancer during the last three years of his life and died of the disease in 2014. He was survived by his wife, six daughters and several grandchildren.

== Select credits ==
- Patrick (1978)
- Long Weekend (1978)
- Snapshot (1979)
- Harlequin (1980)
- Roadgames (1981)
- Race for the Yankee Zephyr (1981)
- Razorback (1984)
- Fortress (1985)
- Frog Dreaming (1985)
- Link (1986)
- Windrider (1986)
- Stingers (TV series) (1998-2001)
- Visitors (2003)
- Storm Warning (2007)
- Long Weekend (2008)
- Nine Miles Down (2009)

=== Television ===
- Homicide
- Division 4
- Matlock Police
- Moon Monkey (1972)
- Fibber, the Dancing Galah (1972)
- Three-Legged Duck (1972)
- Ryan
- Bedlam (1973)
- Poppy and the Closet Junkie (1973)
- A Song for Julie (1973)
- Little Raver (1974)
- The Curse of the Bangerang (1975)
- My Bonnie My Bonny (1975)
- Scout's Honour (1975)
- Bluey (1976)
- Tandarra (1976)
- Solo One (1976)
- The Mooball Man (1976)
- The Hydra (1976)
- Chopper Squad (1978) – pilot
- Skyways (1979)
- Locusts and Wild Honey (1980)
- Special Squad (1984)
- All the Way (1988)
- Police Rescue (1989) – pilot
- Bony (1990) - TV movie
- The Flying Doctors (1991)
- Halfway Across the Galaxy and Turn Left (1992)
- R.F.D.S. (1993)
- Secrets (1993)
- Blue Heelers (1994)
- Snowy River: The McGregor Saga (1994–95)
- Flipper (1995)
- Ship to Shore (1993–96)
- Fire (1995–96)
- The Feds: Seduction (1993)
- Medivac (1996–97)
- Good Guys, Bad Guys (1997–98)
- Ocean Girl (1997)
- Thunderstone (1999)
- Stingers (1998–2001)
- Something in the Air (2000–01)
- Cybergirl (2001)
- The Saddle Club (2003)
- Parallax (2004) – 4 episodes
- Two Twisted (2006) – episode "A Date with Doctor D"
- K-9 (2009) – episode "Alien Avatar"

=== Unmade projects ===
- Firestorm (circa 1984) - film about bushfires in Mornington Peninsula that was to mark his directorial debut. The budget was given at $6 million.
- Breakwater (early 1990s) - a science fiction adventure story set around Half Moon Bay's hulk of the Cerberus with director Richard Franklin
- Making Noises (2010) - co-writer
- High Seas (2010) - a pirate film

== Recognition ==
During De Roche's career he received nominations for two AFI Awards; one for Best Adapted Screenplay for Razorback, and one for Best Original Screenplay for Patrick.

In 2014, De Roche was posthumously awarded the Dorothy Crawford Award for Outstanding Contribution to the Profession.
