= Colin Eggleston =

Australian writer & director

- Born: Colin Richard Francis Eggleston; 23 September 1941; Melbourne, Australia
- Died: 10 August 2002 (aged 60); Geneva, Switzerland
- Occupations: Director, producer, screenwriter
- Spouse(s): Dimity Reed; Briony Behets

Colin Richard Francis Eggleston (/ˈɛɡəlstən/; 23 September 1941, Melbourne – 10 August 2002, Geneva) was an Australian writer and director of TV and films.

== Career ==
Eggleston began his career making police dramas for Crawford Productions. He directed several episodes of Homicide in 1964 and The Long Arm in 1970. He also wrote episodes of Homicide from 1971 to 1972 and continued script-writing for series including Division 4 (1971–1974), Bluey (1977), Chopper Squad (1978) and Rush (1974). He continued to direct during this time, on episodes of Matlock Police (1973–1974) and Division 4 (1974).

Eggleston's first feature film was Fantasm Comes Again (1977), which he directed under the pseudonym 'Eric Ram'. He then directed 1978 horror film Long Weekend. The film won several film festival awards. In 1980, he wrote the script for Nightmares, one of his last.

Eggleston directed several episodes of Bellamy in 1981, before switching his primary focus to film. In 1982, he directed The Little Feller. He then wrote and directed the 1984 film Innocent Prey. In 1986, he directed three films – horror Cassandra, adventure film Sky Pirates and TV movie Body Business. Eggleston's last film was the 1987 comedy-horror TV movie Outback Vampires.

== Personal life and death ==
Eggleston was married twice, to Dimity Reed and Briony Behets, the latter of whom starred in two of his films, Long Weekend (1978) and Nightmares (1980).

Eggleston lived in Europe for several years. He had three children by his first marriage.

He died on 10 August 2002 in Geneva, Switzerland. He was 61.

== Filmography ==
=== Film ===
Year	Title	Role	Notes
1963	A Day in the Life of Robin Beckett		Short film
1977	Fantasm Comes Again	Director (as 'Eric Ram')	
1978	Long Weekend	Director	
1980	Nightmares	Writer / Producer	
1983	Innocent Prey	Writer / Director / Producer	
1983	Academy		
1986	Sky Pirates	Director	
1987	Cassandra	Writer / Director	

=== Television ===
Year	Title	Role	Notes
1964	Homicide	Director	
1967	Doctor Who		
1970	The Long Arm	Director	6 episodes
1971–1972	Homicide	Writer	2 episodes
1971–1973	Homicide	Script editor	15 episodes
1971-1974	Division 4	Writer	8 episodes
1972–1974	Division 4	Director	10 episodes
1972–1974	Matlock Police	Script editor	11 episodes
1973	Ryan	Writer	1 episode
1973–1974	Division 4	Script editor	2 episodes
1973–1974	Matlock Police	Director	5 episodes
1974	Rush	Writer	
1974	The Box	Writer	
1976	The Bluestone Boys	Writer	
1977	Bluey	Writer	2 episodes: "The Whole of Life", "The Changeling"
1977	The Sullivans	Writer	4 episodes
1978	The Lion's Share	Writer / Director	TV movie
1978	Chopper Squad	Writer	1 episode
1978	Cop Shop	Script editor	3 episodes
1978–1981	Cop Shop	Writer	19 episodes
1980–1982	Secret Valley	Director	4 episodes
1981	Bellamy	Director	4 episodes
1981	Airhawk	Producer	TV movie
1982	The Little Feller	Director	TV movie
1986	Body Business	Director	Miniseries
1987	Outback Vampires	Writer / Director	TV movie
