= Richard Franklin (director) =

Australian film director (1948–2007)

- Richard Franklin
- Born: 15 July 1948; Melbourne, Victoria, Australia
- Died: 11 July 2007 (aged 58); Melbourne, Victoria, Australia
- Other name: Richard Bruce
- Occupation: Film director
- Years active: 1975–2003

Richard Franklin (15 July 1948 – 11 July 2007) was an Australian film director.

== Early life and career ==
Franklin was born and grew up in Brighton, Melbourne, the son of Margaret Anne (Jacobson) and Rea Richard Franklin, an engineering company director. He was educated at Haileybury College. In the 1960s, Franklin was the drummer in the Melbourne band The Pink Finks, which also featured Ross Wilson and Ross Hannaford, later of Daddy Cool. The band released several singles, none of which had any significant chart success. Franklin chose a career in film rather than music. He studied film at The University of Southern California alongside other notable directors George Lucas, Robert Zemeckis and John Carpenter. Franklin was a devotee of Alfred Hitchcock (ever since he saw Psycho at the age of 12), and his attempt to arrange a screening of Hitchcock's Rope (1948) at USC produced a call from Hitchcock. Franklin invited Hitchcock to give a lecture at the university, and he became good friends with the director.

== Directing career ==
Franklin returned to Australia in the 1970s, when the country's film industry was experiencing a resurgence. He directed four episodes of the Australian police drama Homicide before directing the bawdy 1975 sex comedy feature The True Story of Eskimo Nell and the 1976 soft-core pornography feature Fantasm. Franklin's next film was the cult horror movie Patrick (1978), written by Everett De Roche, about a man in a coma who uses telekinesis to create murder and mayhem in a hospital. Franklin gave De Roche a copy of the screenplay of Alfred Hitchcock's Rear Window (1954), and De Roche suggested a movie with the plot of Rear Window taking place in a moving vehicle. The result was Roadgames (1981), directed by Franklin from a screenplay by De Roche. Filmed and set in Australia, and starring American actors Stacy Keach and Jamie Lee Curtis (the latter of whom Franklin met whilst visiting his one-time USC classmate John Carpenter on the set of The Fog), Roadgames was the most expensive Australian movie ever made at the time of its release in 1981. In 1981 Franklin was a guest at the Australian SF film convention, Cinecon (Sheraton Hotel, Melbourne) and appeared on a couple of panels with Guest of Honour Robert Bloch. Franklin would shortly direct a film loosely based on Bloch's novel Psycho II, though the film screenplay had little to do with Bloch's novel.

=== American films ===
After moving to Hollywood, Richard Franklin directed Psycho II (1983), the first sequel to Hitchcock's 1960 classic Psycho, with Anthony Perkins reprising the role of Norman Bates. The film was a financial success and received generally good reviews (it also led to a further two sequels, neither of which Franklin was involved with). Franklin then directed the 1984 spy/adventure movie Cloak & Dagger, starring Henry Thomas and Dabney Coleman. The film was a remake of The Window (1949), which was in turn based on the short story "The Boy Who Cried Murder" by Cornell Woolrich (Woolrich's short story "It Had to Be Murder" was adapted into Hitchcock's Rear Window, which was the inspiration for Franklin's Road Games).

Franklin was going to make The Lost Boys at one stage but his next film was Link (1986) a British horror movie (starring Elisabeth Shue and Terence Stamp) about a super-intelligent, murderous orangutan. The film reunited Franklin with screenwriter Everett De Roche.

Franklin was disillusioned with Hollywood after the experience of directing the 1991 action/thriller FX2: The Deadly Art of Illusion (starring Bryan Brown and Brian Dennehy).(why?)

=== Return to Australia ===
He returned to Australia where he filmed Hotel Sorrento (1995) and Brilliant Lies (1996). Franklin called these films

Very conscious attempts to prove that I could do what Australian filmmakers like Peter Weir and Bruce Beresford had done, which was make very classy arthouse types of films. Peter Weir was being offered material like Witness, that I would have loved to have directed, because he was perceived as an arthouse filmmaker. Whereas even in Hollywood I was perceived as a genre filmmaker, and not able to get these special elements that would win Oscars and the like.

=== Final years ===
Franklin's final film, Visitors, was shot in 2003. He lectured at Swinburne School of Film and Television in Australia until his death.

Richard Franklin died of prostate cancer on 11 July 2007, four days before his 59th birthday. The documentary film Not Quite Hollywood: The Wild, Untold Story of Ozploitation! (2008), for which Franklin was interviewed, was released after his death and was dedicated to him. Before his death, Franklin was set to be interviewed for The Psycho Legacy, a documentary that examined the Psycho franchise; however, the said interview with him was never filmed. Nevertheless, Franklin was enthusiastic about the documentary project and had wanted to do whatever he could to assist in its production.

Quentin Tarantino has cited Roadgames as his favourite Australian movie, and he screened Psycho II at the sixth Quentin Tarantino Film Festival (2005). Tarantino revealed in an interview that when he was a teenager, he wanted to write a book on genre filmmakers, and Richard Franklin was one of the directors he wanted to engage in conversation for it.

== Filmography ==
Year	Film	Director	Producer	Writer	Notes
1975	The True Story of Eskimo Nell	Yes	Yes	Yes	Also known as Dick Down Under
1976	Fantasm	Yes			Credited as "Richard Bruce"
1978	Patrick	Yes	Yes		Nominated – AACTA Award for Best Film
1980	The Blue Lagoon		Yes		Co-producer
1981	Roadgames	Yes	Yes	Yes	
1983	Psycho II	Yes			
1984	Cloak & Dagger	Yes			
1986	Link	Yes	Yes		
1991	F/X2	Yes			
1993	Running Delilah	Yes			Television film
1995	Hotel Sorrento	Yes	Yes	Yes	AACTA Award for Best Adapted Screenplay; Nominated – AACTA Award for Best Film; Nominated – AACTA Award for Best Direction; Nominated – Tokyo International Film Festival – Grand Prix
1996	Brilliant Lies	Yes	Yes	Yes	
1997	One Way Ticket	Yes			Television film
1999	Harry's War		Yes		
1999–2000	The Lost World	Yes			Television film pilot + four additional episodes
2000–2001	BeastMaster	Yes			5 episodes
2002	Flatland	Yes			2 episodes
2003	Visitors	Yes	Yes		
2007	Cut the Crap		Yes		Executive producer; Final project
