= Bellamy (TV series) =

- Genre: Police crime drama Action
- Created by: Ron McLean
- Starring: John Stanton; Tim Elston; James Condon; Brian Young; Tom Richards
- Theme music composer: Francis Monkman
- Opening theme: "Perpetual Motion"
- Country of origin: Australia
- Original language: English
- No. of seasons: 1
- No. of episodes: 26

Production
- Executive producer: Don Battye
- Producers: David Lee; Jan Bladier
- Production locations: Sydney, New South Wales
- Running time: 60 minutes
- Production company: Reg Grundy Organisation
- Budget: $2 million

Original release
- Network: Network Ten
- Release: 4 June – 18 December 1981

Bellamy is an Australian police action drama television series that originally aired on Network Ten for one season from 4 June 1981. It was created by Ron McLean and produced by the Reg Grundy Organisation.

== Synopsis ==
The series focused on a maverick cop named Steve Bellamy (John Stanton). His partner was Detective Mitchell (Tim Elston). Recurring characters in the series were the disapproving Daley (James Condon) who appeared in 21 episodes, the forensics technician Clem (Brian Young) who was in 15 of the episodes. Adam Garnett as Ginger, a street-wise child who befriended Bellamy, appeared in six early episodes but was phased-out of the series. Later in the run Tom Richards appeared as Detective Burns over five episodes. In the story Burns was ultimately revealed to be corrupt.

== Production ==
In February 1980, Network Ten announced that they had commissioned two new television dramas from the Grundy Organisation – Bellamy, originally billed as a private eye series, and Punishment, a prison series. They allocated a budget of $4 million for 26 one-hour episodes of both productions. At the time, it was "the largest single television deal negotiated in Australia". Further confirmation of the deal between Grundy and Ten to make the series with a $2 million budget was reported in November 1980. Executive producer Don Battye explained that every episode would focus on a self-contained plot, similar to Australian police dramas Homicide, Division 4 and Matlock Police. Actor John Stanton was cast in the lead role of Bellamy, who Battye described as "a very tough policeman, but a man of compassion." Filming for the two-hour pilot took place in Sydney during August and September 1980. Production on a further 25 episodes began in December, with Battye confirming that they would be broadcast in early 1981. The two-hour pilot episode was written by show creator Ron McLean and originally broadcast on 4 June 1981.

The series was noticeably more violent than previous Australian police series such as those made by Crawford Productions during the 1970s.

Bellamy attracted only mediocre ratings and was shifted around the schedules several times. The series was not renewed beyond the initial series of 26 one-hour episodes.

Despite not being the success that Grundy's and Ten hoped it would be, the series was replayed twice in syndication on the very network that originally screened it, the first of the reruns on Ten was during various late night time-slots on Mondays weekly during 1986 and then during the summer of 1989–1990 at 5am Saturday mornings weekly. Ten have not replayed the series since.

The series was aired in the United Kingdom on London ITV in 1984.

During the last few years, Bellamy had a select number of episodes to view on YouTube though in the last year or so the series is currently not available on any TV channel or streaming platform.

== Cast and characters ==
- John Stanton as Detective Sergeant Steve Bellamy
- Tim Elston as Detective Senior Constable Charles Mitchell
- James Condon as Detective Inspector Wallis Daley
- Brian Young as Clem, forensic expert
- Adam Garnett as Ginger
- Tom Richards as Detective Burns
- Sally Conabere as Jane Bellamy, wife of Steve Bellamy
