= Australian International Film Corporation =

Australian film production company

Australian International Film Corporation was an Australian film production company set up in 1977. It was a wholly owned subsidiary of Filmways Australia and one of the shareholders was producer Antony I. Ginnane.
