= Vincent Monton =

Australian cinematographer

Vincent Monton is an Australian cinematographer, writer and director. He made several films in the 1970s for Antony I. Ginnane.

== Select credits ==
- Fantasm Comes Again (1977) - cinematographer
- Newsfront (1978) - cinematographer
- Windrider (1986) - director
- Fatal Bond (1991) - director
- The Hit (2001) - director (Note: Cast included Maxwell Caulfield, Christine Elise, Joanna Pacula, Lucky Vanous; filmed in Lithuania.)
