= Helga Gill =

Women Suffrage Society Organiser

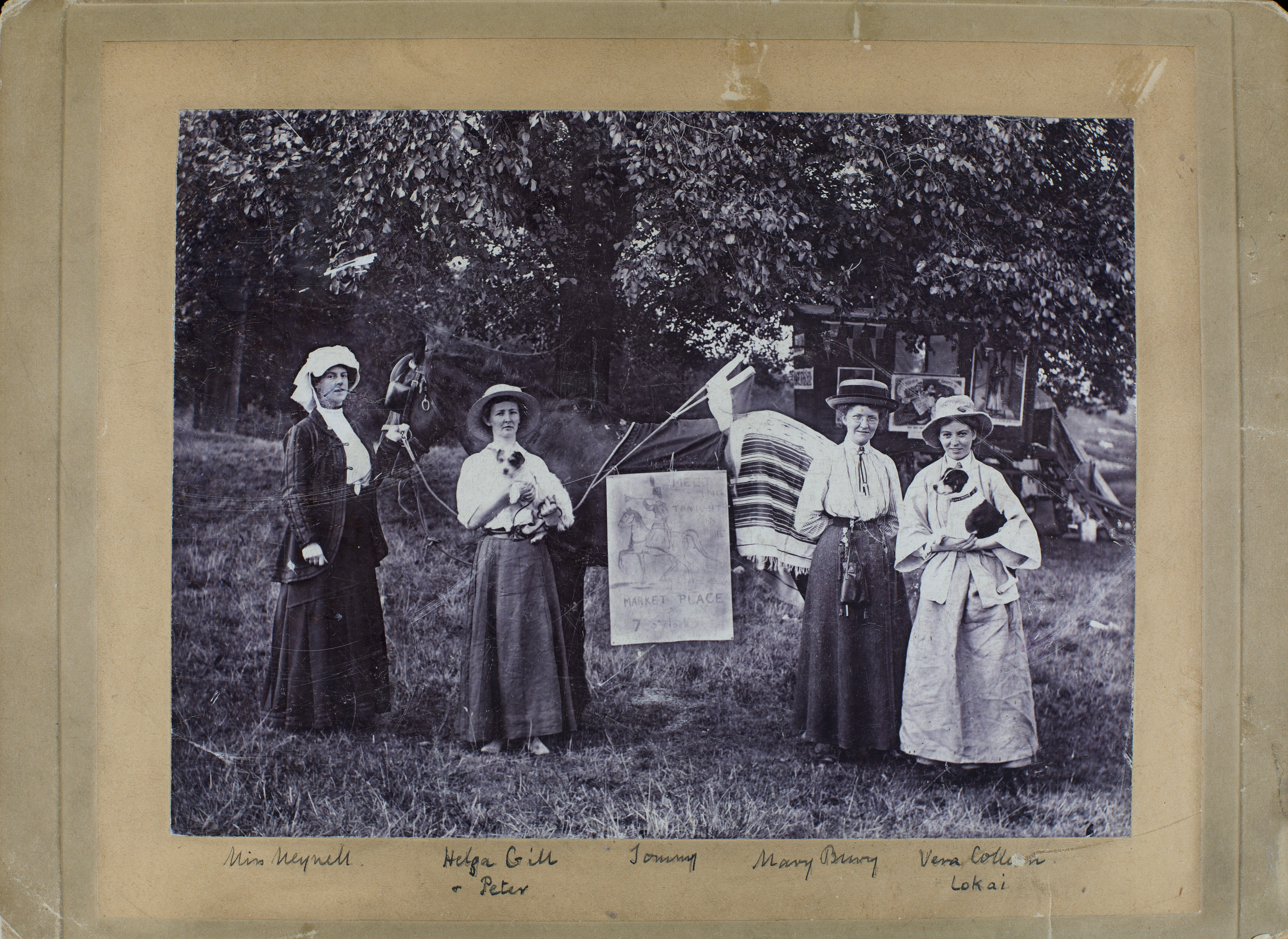
- Helga Gill pictured with Mary Bury, Vera Collison, and Miss Meynell on the first First Suffrage Caravan Tour through Leciester and Northamptonshire
- Born: 1885; Bergen, Norway
- Died: 1928 (aged 42–43)
- Occupation: NUWSS Organiser

Helga Gill (1885–1928) was a Norwegian-British suffragette. She was an organiser for the National Union of Women's Suffrage Societies and campaigned on behalf of Women's Suffrage across the UK.

== Early life ==
Helga Gill was born in 1885 in Bergen, Norway to parents were Johan Klerk Gill and Karen Marie Ottilia Gill. She was their oldest child and had five siblings. Her mother died when she was a child, and Helga helped raise her brothers and sisters.

== Work at NUWSS ==
Helga Gill initially visited the United Kingdom for a holiday. She made friends with members of the politically prominent Corbett family, Marie and her daughters Cecily and Margery. Gill was speaking at suffrage meetings and was the organiser of the NUWSS by 1909. Sissel Rosland has argued that she was a 'popular and busy campaigner' between 1909 and 1914. Newspaper reports show that she was critical of the militancy of the suffragettes, and frequently referenced her Norwegian origins in her speeches. Norway had given women partial suffrage in 1907, and so Gill's viewpoint of a voting woman was valued. By 1912 she was an Organiser for Oxford, Berks, and Bucks and was sent on a tour of Ireland by the NUWSS to promote women's suffrage.

== Work in World War I ==
When World War One broke out in 1914, Gill signed up to join the Scottish Women's Hospitals, a wartime project funded by the NUWSS. She was a part of the French Hospital Unit and left for France in December 1914, where she was based at Royaumont Abbey. Gill worked as an ambulance driver, transporting injured soldiers to the hospital. This was a dangerous role that carried the risk of being killed. This work took its toll on her health, and because of this she left France and worked at HM Factory Gretna for the remainder of the war.

== Personal life ==
Helga adopted a war orphan, John Gill. She was the only woman member of the British Legion, Danehill branch and also ran the Boy's Brigade and was a member of the Women's Institute.

== Later life and death ==
Helga Gill's health was permanently affected by her wartime service. She died suddenly as a result of a car crash on 16 November 1928, and was mourned both by the local community, in The Mid Sussex Times, and by suffrage periodical The Common Cause.

== Awards ==
As a result of her wartime work in France, she was awarded the British War Medal, Victory Medal, Croix de Guerre, and the Médaille des Épidémies.
