= Rebecca Gilling =

Australian former model and actress

- Born: 3 November 1953 (age 73); Castlecrag, Sydney, Australia
- Occupations: Actress, CEO,
- Years active: 1972-2009 (as actress)
- Notable work: Return to Eden as Stephanie Harper; The Young Doctors as Dr. Liz Kennedy
- Spouse: Tony Pringle (1985-2003)
- Children: 3
- Mother: Bridget Gilling
- Family: Cicely Corbett Fisher (grandmother); Charles Corbett (great grandfather); Marie Corbett (great-grandmother); Dame Margery Corbet Ashby (great-aunt)

Rebecca Gilling (born 3 November 1953) is an Australian former actress, and environmentalist, known for her roles in TV, soap operas and serials, most notably The Young Doctors and Return to Eden.

== Early life ==
Gilling was born in 1953 in Castlecrag, a suburb of Sydney, Australia. Of British descent, she is from a family that were heavily involved in politics. Her mother was prominent feminist Bridget Gilling, who was also a social worker. Her father was WWI navy servicemen Douglas Chambers. Her grandmother was notable suffragist Cicely Corbett Fisher. Whilst her great-grandparents were politicians for the Liberal Party (UK), her great-grandfather was Charles Corbett, who was married to suffragist Marie Corbett. Her great-aunt was suffragist, liberal and feminist Dame Margery Corbet Ashby.

== Career ==
Gilling made her theatre debut in 1972. She subsequently made her film debut in the 1974 outlaw biker Ozploitation classic Stone. She came to prominence the same year, in the Number 96 film (based on the series of the same name), as 'bad girl' flight attendant Diana Moore, even though she was not a member of the regular TV series cast. Her next acting role was in the Brian Trenchard-Smith action film The Man from Hong Kong (1975), which was released in the U.S. as The Dragon Flies.

Gilling went on to act in several television series. She played a regular role in Glenview High (1978–1979) as Robbie Dean and then appeared in The Young Doctors (1979–1981) as Liz Kennedy. Gilling later achieved international recognition in both the miniseries (1983) and subsequent series (1986) of Return to Eden, as protagonist Stephanie Harper.

She had smaller guest roles in the film The Naked Country (1985), TV series City West (1984), TV movies The Blue Lightning (1986), A Dangerous Life (1988) and Danger Down Under (1988), and miniseries The Paper Man (1990).

During the 1990s, she made a guest appearance on medical drama G.P. and was a presenter on the Nine Network lifestyle series Our House.

Gilling has been with the Australian not-for-profit environmental organisation, Planet Ark for over 20 years, and is a spokesperson for National Tree Day. She was appointed CEO of Planet Ark in 2022. Additionally, she has a Masters of Sustainability from Macquarie University and has studied horticulture.

== Filmography ==
=== Film ===
Year	Title	Role	Type
1974	Number 96	Diana Moore	Feature film
1974	Stone	Vanessa	Feature film
1975	The Man from Hong Kong	Angelica	Feature film
1985	The Naked Country	Mary Dillon	Feature film
1987	Feathers	Fran	Film short
1990	Heaven Tonight	Annie Dysart	Feature film
1994	The Raid	Narrator (voice)	Film documentary
2009	Not Quite Hollywood: The Wild, Untold Story of Ozploitation!	Herself	Feature film documentary

=== Television ===
Year	Title	Role	Type
1974	Silent Number	Futility Cragg	1 episode
1975	Armchair Cinema	Secretary	1 episode
1976	Chopper Squad	Georgia Batie	Pilot
1976	Secret Doors		TV movie
1978	Cop Shop	Carla Moore	2 episodes
1978-1979	Glenview High	Robbie Dean	39 episodes
1979–1981	The Young Doctors	Liz Kennedy	42 episodes
1981	Holiday Island	Trish McKenzie	Pilot series, 2 episodes
1982	A Country Practice	Robin Nichols	2 episodes
1983	Return to Eden	Stephanie Harper / Tara Welles	Miniseries, 3 episodes
1984	City West	Jean Cheney	7 episodes
1984	Carson's Law	Debra Grayson	1 episode
1985	Special Squad		1 episode
1985	Five Mile Creek	Miss Armstrong	1 episode
1986	Return to Eden	Stephanie Harper	22 episodes
1986	The Blue Lightning	Kate McQueen	TV movie
1987	Danger Down Under (aka Harris Down Under)	Sharon Harris	TV movie
1988	A Dangerous Life	Angie Fox	Miniseries, 2 episodes
1989	The Saint: Fear in Fun Park	Aileen	TV movie
1990	The Paper Man	Virginia Morgan	Mniseries
1993	G.P.	Jenna Clarke	1 episode
1997	Mystique of the Pearl	Narrator (voice)	TV documentary
2002	The Dragon Chronicles	Voice	Animated series

== Theatre ==
Year	Title	Role	Type
1972	The Star and the Branch		BOAMA, Speech and Drama Studio, Sydney
1974	The Little Prince	Geographer	Mechthild Harkness Speech and Drama Workshop, Sydney
1982	What the Butler Saw		Marian St Theatre, Sydney
1994–1995	False Accusations		
1995	The Mudlarks		
