= James Smillie =

Australian actor

- Born: 28 November 1944 (age 81); Glasgow, Scotland
- Other names: James Smillie; Jim Smillie; Jim Smilie
- Occupations: Actor, presenter
- Years active: 1963–present
- Known for: Return to Eden as Dr. Dan Marshall; Prisoner as Steve Wilson

James Smillie (born 28 November 1944), also credited variously as Jim Smillie and Jim Smilie, is a Scottish-Australian actor. He has worked in both Britain and Australia in film, extensively on stage, on television, and in radio broadcasting, voiceover and animation work.

== Early life ==
Smillie was born in Glasgow, Scotland. His parents emigrated to Australia in the early 1950s when Smillie was a child, where he grew up in Perth, in Western Australia. He began his career in entertainment at the age of 10, as a soprano singing with symphony orchestras. With no established drama schools in Perth, he developed his craft as a radio actor at the ABC, before acting with a university graduate company in productions of Hamlet and Mourning Becomes Electra. He then relocated to the east coast of Australia, where he began working as a newsreader, announcer and host at Channel 0 (which later became Network 10).

== Career ==
Although his family remained in Perth, Smillie returned to the United Kingdom in 1972, to appear in stage roles in London's West End. He has continued to divide his time between the UK and Australia throughout his career, working in television, film and stage productions, and as a voiceover artist.

=== Television and film ===
Smillie has appeared in numerous television shows. While still in Australia, he was one of the hosts of British children's series Crackerjack in 1966, with the scripts flown over from England. He also hosted his own series I Like Music in 1971.

After relocating to the UK to further his career, Smillie landed roles in Z-Cars and General Hospital and appeared in game show The Generation Game. He also played the recurring part of Mr. Spencer in 1976 children's series Jumbo Spencer. Out of necessity, Smillie returned to Australia in 1979 to ensure he retained his Australian citizenship. While there, he secured a thirteen week contract with prison soap opera Prisoner, playing one of his best known roles to date, lawyer Steve Wilson.

Following this, Smillie returned to England with his family to settle down and resume his career. He featured as Malcolm McCrae in 1980 children's miniseries The Latchkey Children, based on the award-winning novel by Eric Allen.

Then in 1983, Smillie was invited back to Australia, after being offered what became another of his most prominent roles – that of Doctor Dan Marshall in drama miniseries Return to Eden, a part he later reprised for the full series of the same name in 1985, reuniting with his Prisoner co-star Peta Toppano. The series ran for 22 episodes, but while successful internationally, it failed to make its mark in Australia.

Smilie has also guested in numerous television series in both the UK and Australia. His British guest credits include anthology show Thriller (1975), Scottish drama series The Mackinnons (1977) and police drama The Gentle Touch (1980). He appeared in sci-fi series Space: 1999 (1977), Red Dwarf (1991) and Highlander: The Series (1994). His Australian guest credits include children's series Adventure Island (1967), police dramas Cop Shop and Special Squad (both 1984) and later, Always Greener (2002). He had several individual guest roles in both Homicide and Division 4.

Smillie has also made numerous appearances in light entertainment shows, including Highway (with Sir Harry Secombe), six-part BBC comedy revue series Battle of the Sexes (1976) and The Barry Humphries Show (1977).

Smillie had a small role as a commentator in American drama film International Velvet, the 1978 sequel to National Velvet, alongside Christopher Plummer, Anthony Hopkins and Tatum O’Neal. He also had a small part in 1979 American action film Jaguar Lives!, opposite Christopher Lee and Donald Pleasence. In 1983, he appeared in made-for-TV movie Skin Deep, which featured Nicole Kidman in an early role.

Later, Smillie appeared in 2002 TV sports drama film The Junction Boys, alongside Tom Berenger and Ryan Kwanten. Two action adventure TV films followed, with Final Contract: Death on Delivery in 2005 and Good Girl, Bad Girl in 2006. More recently, he had parts in English-Italian romance film The Correspondence with Jeremy Irons, and historical sports drama Tommy's Honour with Sam Neill, both in 2016, before appearing in 2017 British drama Romans (aka Retaliation) alongside Orlando Bloom He then had a role in 2019 British black comedy adventure film Get Duked!.

=== Theatre ===
Smillie has appeared as a leading man on stage in both the UK and Australia. His early stage credits in Australia included playing Orin in Eugene O'Neill's Mourning Becomes Electra (1964), the title role in Tom Jones at the Perth Festival (1969), Edward Rutledge in a J. C. Williamson's touring production of 1776 (1971), and Chance Williams in Tennessee Williams's Sweet Bird of Youth (1972).

In 1972, Smillie landed his breakout stage role on London's West End, playing Tony in a staging of West Side Story. He went on to play leading men in a string of further West End productions; notably an Italian Lothario in Brian Clemens' whodunit Lover at Ambassadors Theatre and Nicos in Zorba, both in 1973. He appeared as Henry II in Thomas and The King at Her Majesty's Theatre in 1975 and Dr. Thomas Barnardo in Barnardo at the Royalty Theatre in 1980,

Smillie featured in a Royal Variety Performance in 1983, alongside the likes of Laurence Olivier, Michael Barrymore, Twiggy and Finola Hughes, which was hosted by Gene Kelly. The following year he played the role of Emile de Beque in South Pacific in Australia in 1984.

Returning to the UK after his Australian stint in Return to Eden, Smillie played the leading role of Georges in a 1987 production of La Cage aux Folles at the London Palladium, after Denis Quiley retired from the role. The story was centred around two middle-aged gay men raising a teenage son together, while running a club in St Tropez. However, three weeks after James made the role his own, the show closed, due to a slump in bookings caused by the AIDS scare of the 1980s.

Smillie played the role of Reverend James Mavor Morrell in a 1993 UK tour of George Bernard Shaw's Candida. In 1996, he portrayed Fred Graham in Kiss Me Kate for Royal Shakespeare Company, also landing the lead role of Captain von Trapp in The Sound of Music. Following a successful run as Mack Sennet in the 1996 London production of Mack & Mabel, Smilie recorded the part of Fred / Petruchio again in the full live production of Kiss Me, Kate for the BBC in London with the BBC Concert Orchestra.

1997 to 1998 saw Smillie touring in the UK Productions tour of 42nd Street, playing the lead role of producer Julian Marsh, a role he reprised once more from 1999 to 2000. He returned to Australia in 2001, to play Pastor Manders in Henrik Ibsen's Ghosts for Perth International Arts Festival. In 2003, he went on to play Charles in Stephen Sondheim's Putting It Together at the Library Theatre in Manchester. This was followed in 2004 with a touring production of Annie, in which he played Daddy Warbucks.

In 2015, Smillie was in a Lost Musicals production of Fanny at London's Sadler’s Wells Theatre, portraying Caesar. Most recently, he has appeared in stage productions at the Traverse Theatre, Òran Mór, and the Pitlochry Festival Theatre in Scotland.

=== Radio and voiceover ===
Smillie is a regular radio and concert broadcaster for the BBC, particularly on the series Friday Night is Music Night, presenting special occasions such as Sondheim on the South Bank, An Evening with Cole Porter at the Royal Festival Hall, and playing Pilate in Jesus Christ Superstar at the Barbican Centre.

Smillie is also a multi award-winning voiceover artist. He was the original voice of Sky, voicing programmes in the UK for over a decade and voiced the role of Justice Computer in British sci-fi series Red Dwarf.

Smillie has also performed voiceover for numerous advertisements, with brands including CNN, Netflix, Ford Capri, Securite Assurance, Papa John's, Amels Yachts, The Scottish Cup, Florida Aquarium, Star Dynasties, Turkish Space Agency, Suzuki, Fantasy Flight Films, Pixel Elixir, Funcom, Citibank, Aveleda Wines and Ardnamurchan Whisky, Phillips and The New York Times. He has voiced characters for videos games including Warhammer’s World of Tanks, Lord of the Rings, Goblin Stone, King Lot, Space Cows and Golden Toad. He has also provided voiceover for animations, and narrated documentaries, podcasts and audiobooks.

== Personal life ==
Smillie currently lives in Glasgow, in Scotland.

== Stage ==
Year	Production	Role	Venue / Co.	Ref
1963	The Duenna	Father Augustine / Maids, nuns, monks, masqueraders, servants	Old Dolphin Theatre, Perth with Bankside Theatre Productions	
1964	Hamlet		New Fortune Theatre, Perth with Bankside Theatre Productions for Perth Festival	
1964	Mourning Becomes Electra	Orin	Old Dolphin Theatre, Perth with GRADS Theatre Co	
1968	Razza-Ma-Tazz (and All That Jazz)	Constable Brian Buttons	Southland Auditorium, Melbourne	
1969	Tom Jones	Tom Jones	Perth Festival	
1971	1776	South Carolina – Edward Rutledge	Her Majesty's Theatre, Melbourne, Theatre Royal Sydney with J. C. Williamson's	
1972	Sweet Bird of Youth	Chance Wayne	Playhouse, Perth with National Theatre	
1972–1973	West Side Story	Tony	Bristol Hippodrome & London	
1973	Lover	Bruno Varella	UK tour	
1973	Zorba	Nicos	Greenwich Theatre, London	
1974	Saint Joan	Captain La Hire	New Theatre Oxford	
1975	Thomas and the King	Henry II	Her Majesty's Theatre, London	
1980	Barnardo	Dr. Thomas Barnardo	Royalty Theatre, London	
	Mother Courage and Her Children	Eilif		
1983	Royal Variety Performance	Performer	Theatre Royal, London	
1984	South Pacific	Emile de Beque	His Majesty's Theatre, Perth with National Theatre	
1987	La Cage au Folles	Georges	London Palladium	
1987	Kiss Me, Kate	Fred Graham	The Old Vic, London, Savoy Theatre, London with Royal Shakespeare Company	
1987	Mary Stuart	Musician	Assembly Hall, Edinburgh for Edinburgh International Festival	
1993	Candida	Reverend James Mavor Morrell	UK tour	
1996	Paradise Lost	Satan	St. George’s Cathedral, Perth	
1996	Mack & Mabel	Mack Sennet	London	
1996	The Sound of Music	Captain von Trapp	His Majesty's Theatre, Perth	
1996	Kiss Me, Kate	Fred Graham / Petruchio	BBC with BBC Concert Orchestra	
1996–1997; 1999–2000	42nd Street	Julian Marsh	Theatre Royal, Bath with UK Productions	
2001	Ghosts	Pastor Manders	Hole in Wall Theatre for Perth International Arts Festival	
2001	Mack & Mabel	Mack Sennet	State Theatre at Victorian Arts Centre with The Production Company	
2003	Putting It Together	Charles	Manchester Central Library	
2003	Anyone Can Whistle	Comptroller Schub	Bridewell Theatre, London with The Gryphon	
2004	Annie	Daddy Warbucks	UK tour	
	Too Far Gone	Aaron	Traverse Theatre, Edinburgh	
2012	White Christmas	General Waverley	Pitlochry Festival Theatre, Scotland	
2013	Marco Pantani: The Pirate	Grandfather	Òran Mór, Glasgow with A Play A Pie & a Pint	
2014	Don Quixote	Don Quixote	Òran Mór, Glasgow with A Play A Pie & a Pint	
2014	Miracle on 34th Street	Kris Kringle	Pitlochry Festival Theatre, Scotland	
2015	Fanny	Caesar	Sadlers Wells, London with Lost Musicals	
2026	Last Call	Roderick Usher	Camden People's Theatre, London for Camden Fringe Festival	

== Filmography ==
=== Television ===
Year	Title	Role	Notes	Ref
1965	Folk Cellar	Host	1 episode	
1966–1972	Homicide	Various roles	5 episodes	
1967	Adventure Island	Smilie Jim	1 episode	
1967	Crackerjack!	Host		
1969	Good Morning Mr Doubleday		1 episode	
1969–1973	Division 4	Various roles	8 episodes	
1970	Delta	Derek	1 episode	
1971	Dynasty	TV Interviewer	1 episode	
1971	The Magic of Music	Host		
1971	I Like Music	Host	13 episodes	
1972	Dead of Night	Keith Hopkirk	Episode: "Bedtime"	
1973	The World About Us	Narrator	Documentary series, episode: "The Tea and Sugar – A Story of the Nullarbor"	
1974	Dial M for Murder	Larry Peters	1 episode	
1974	Z-Cars	Roy Prentiss	1 episode	
1975	Thriller	Bob Mallory	1 episode	
1975	Wodehouse Playhouse	Police Sergeant	1 episode	
1975	Space: 1999	Baxter	1 episode	
1976	Jumbo Spencer	Mr. Spencer (credited as Jim Smillie)	3 episodes	
1976	Battle of the Sexes	Various roles (credited as James Smilie)	6 episodes	
1977	The Tomorrow People	Mike Harding	2 episodes	
1977	The Mackinnons	James Grant	2 episodes	
1977	The Barry Humphries Show	Singing Hussar	2 episodes	
1978	Life at Stake	Wayne Grant	1 episode	
1979	Prisoner (aka Prisoner: Cell Block H)	Steve Wilson	28 episodes	
1980	The Gentle Touch	Harry	1 episode	
1980	The Latchkey Children	Malcolm McCrae	Miniseries, 3 episodes	
1980	Metal Mickey	Manager	1 episode	
1981	Take a Letter, Mr. Jones	Dr. Norton (credited as James Smilie)	1 episode	
1983	Return to Eden	Dr. Dan Marshall (credited as Jim Smilie)	Miniseries, 3 episodes	
1984	Skin Deep	Cliff Hudson	TV film	
1984	Special Squad	Donaghue	Episode 9: "Same Time Friday"	
1984	Cop Shop		2 episodes	
1985	Return to Eden	Dr. Dan Marshall (credited as James Smillie)	22 episodes	
1988	1987 Laurence Olivier Awards		TV special	
1990	The Word	Mission	1 episode	
1991	Red Dwarf	Justice Computer (voice)	1 episode	
1991	4 Play	Maggot (voice)	1 episode	
1994	Highlander: The Series	John Bowers	Season 2, episode: "Legacy"	
1994	Red Dwarf: Smeg Ups	Justice Computer (voice)	Video	
2002	Always Greener	Frank (voiceover)	1 episode	
2002	The Junction Boys	Dwayne Hess	TV film	
2006	Final Contract: Death on Delivery		TV film	
2006	Good Girl, Bad Girl		TV film	
2021	Star Wars: Battlefront Fan Cast	Saesse Tiin	1 episode	
2022	Doctor Who: The Sixth Doctor Adventures	A.M (voice)	1 episode	
2025	The Long Winding Road	Narrator	TV Documentary	

=== Film ===
Year	Title	Role	Notes	Ref
1978	International Velvet	Commentator	Feature film	
1979	Jaguar Lives!	Reardon	Feature film	
1983	Abra Cadabra	Mr Pig (voice)	Animated film	
1993	Opéra imaginaire	Narrator	Animated film (English version)	
2016	The Correspondence (aka La corrispondenza)	Preside / Dean of Faculty	Feature film	
2016	Tommy's Honour	A.K.H. Boyd	Feature film	
2017	Romans (aka Retaliation)	The Priest (Jimmy)	Feature film	
2019	Get Duked! (aka Boyz in the Wood)	Duke #1	Feature film	
2020	Small Island Ghost	Narrator	Short film	
2023	The Man from Oghuz	Vazir Imran (voice)	Animated short film	
2024	The Pleasures of the Damned	Voice	Short film (in post-production)	

== Podcast series ==
Year	Title	Role	Notes	Ref
2020	Making the Cut: The (Mostly) True Story of a Retired Surgeon	Father / Mr Maingot / Education Dept Secretary / British Man 2		
2021	Worlds of Doctor Who: Special Releases: Lady Christina	John Flint	Season 2, 1 episode	
2021	Worlds of Doctor Who: Special Releases: Missy	Alfredo	Season 3, 1 episode	
2021	Beyond the Dark			
2023	Folktown	Narrator	4 episodes	
	Once Upon a Time in Zombieville	Voom Buckstop / Dr Smillie		
2024	The Fountainhead			

== Video games ==
Year	Title	Role	Notes	Ref
2010	World of Tanks		Video game	
2021	Spinning Spellbooks		Video game	
2021	Goblins of Elderstone		Video game	
2022	Vox Machinae	Hans	Video game	
2022	Star Dynasties		Video game	
2023	Age of the Witch	King Lot	Video game	
2023	Inkunilati		Video game	
2024	Goblin Stone	Narrator	Video game	
2024	Cygni: All Guns Blazing		Video game	
	The Lord of the Rings: Adventure Card Game		Video game	
	Space Cows		Video game	
	Golden Toad		Video game	

== Awards and nominations ==
Year	Category	Award	Work	Result	Ref
2019	British Podcast Awards	Gold Podcast Award	Once Upon a Time in Zombieville	Won	
2019	Vox Awards	Best Character Performance	The Lord of the Rings: Adventure Card Game	Nominated	
2020	One Voice Awards	Best Male Character Voice – Animation	It's Hip to Be Square	Nominated	
2020	One Voice Awards	Best Male Performance – Gaming	Space Cows	Nominated	
2020	One Voice Awards	Best Male Performance – Radio Drama	Once Upon a Time in Zombieville	Nominated	
2020	One Voice Awards	Best Male Performance – TV / Web Commercial	Citibank Australia – Charles the Bulldog	Nominated	
2020	One Voice Awards	Best Overall Performance – TV Promo	Scottish Cup Final	Nominated	
2021	Devgamm! Indie Game Awards	Best Narration	Goblin Stone	Won	
2021	One Voice Awards	Best Male Performance – Demo Reel	Character reel	Won	
2021	One Voice Awards	Best Male Character Performance – Animation	Goblin Stone	Nominated	
2021	One Voice Awards	Best Overall Performance – Corporate / Explainer	Aveleda	Nominated	
2021	One Voice Awards	Best Male Performance – Gaming	Spinning Spellbooks	Nominated	
2021	One Voice Awards	Best Male Performance – Radio Commercial	Royal Life Saving	Nominated	
2021	One Voice Awards	Best Male Performance – TV / Web Commercial	Best Cars in the World	Nominated	
2021	One Voice Awards	Best Male Performance – TV Documentary	The King on His Throne	Nominated	
2021	One Voice Awards	Best Overall Performance – TV Promo	Scottish Cup Final: Celtic Vs Hearts	Nominated	
2021	One Voice Awards	Male Voiceover Artist of the Year		Nominated	
2021	Vox Awards	Best Character Performance	Once Upon a Time in Zombieville	Won	
2022	One Voice Awards	Best Performance – TV Promo	4 Days to Save the World	Won	
2022	One Voice Awards	Male Voiceover Artist of the Year		Nominated	
2022	One Voice Awards	Best Male Performance – Gaming	Star Dynasties	Nominated	
2022	One Voice Awards	Best Performance – Radio Promo	Grimguard Tactics	Nominated	
2022	One Voice Awards	Best Male Performance – TV Documentary	TUA The Space Agency	Nominated	
2022	Vox Awards	Best Visual Advertising Campaign	Flibustier Paris – Rock Star	Won	
2022	Vox Awards	Judge's Choice Award	Flibustier Paris – Rock Star	Won	
2022	Vox Awards	Best Male Voice Performance – TV Promo		Won	
2022	Vox Awards	Best Use of Humour	The Ivy Collection	Nominated	
2022	Vox Awards	Best Character Performance	Goblins of Elderstone	Nominated	
2022	Vox Awards	Best Voiceover of the Year		Won	
2023	One Voice Awards	Best Male Performance – Gaming	Inkunilati	Won	
2023	One Voice Awards	Best Male Performance – Radio Commercial	Pet Food Warehouse – It's a Jungle Out There	Won	
2023	One Voice Awards	Male Voiceover Artist of the Year		Won	
2023	One Voice Awards	Best Overall Performance – Corporate / Explainer	Amels Yachting	Nominated	
2023	Vox Awards	Best Voiceover of the Year		Won	
2024	One Voice Awards	Best Overall Performance – TV Promo	CNN’s Call to Earth Day	Won	
2024	One Voice Awards	Male Voiceover Artist of the Year		Nominated	
2024	One Voice Awards	Best Male Performance – Audio (Drama)	The Fountainhead	Nominated	
2024	One Voice Awards	Best Male Performance – Radio Commercial	DHL	Nominated	
2024	Vox Awards	Best Human Performance in an Audio Drama / Podcast	The Fountainhead	Nominated	
2024	Vox Awards	Best Human Performance in an Animation	Akogun – Brutalizer of Gods	Nominated	
2024	Vox Awards	Best Male Voiceover of the Year		Nominated	
2025	One Voice Awards	Best Performance – Audiobook (Fiction)	The Wendigo	Won	
2025	One Voice Awards	Best Overall Performance – Corporate / Explainer	Blackout LivePlot XR	Nominated	
2025	One Voice Awards	Best Male Performance – Gaming	Cygni: All Guns Blazing	Nominated	
2025	One Voice Awards	Best Overall Performance – TV Documentary	The Long Winding Road	Nominated	
2025	One Voice Awards	Male Voiceover Artist of the Year		Nominated	
2026	One Voice Awards	Best Overall Performance – Corporate / Explainer	Cask 88 – Every Whisky Has a Story	Nominated	
2026	One Voice Awards	Outstanding Live Event Announcer	The 2025 European Congress on Evangelism – Gospel History in Europe	Nominated	
2026	One Voice Awards	Best Male Performance – TV / Web Commercial	Telia – iPhone 16 Pro	Nominated	
