= Bridget Gilling =

Australian feminist and social activist

- Born: Bridget Sabina Fisher; 1 January 1922; London, England, United Kingdom
- Died: 31 December 2009 (aged 86); Blue Mountains, New South Wales, Australia
- Occupation: Suffragist
- Spouse: Douglass Gilling
- Children: 4 including Rebecca Gilling
- Parent: Cicely Corbett Fisher (mother)
- Family: Charles Corbett (Grandfather); Marie Corbett (Grandmother); Margery Corbett Ashby (Aunty)

Bridget Sabina Gilling, (née Fisher) (1 January 1922 – 31 December 2009) was an English-born Australian feminist and social activist.

== Biography ==
Gilling was born in London, England in 1922 and raised in Sussex amid a politically active family. Her grandparents, Charles and Marie Corbett, were active in the British Liberal Party; her mother Cicely and aunt Dame Margery Corbett Ashby were prominent suffragists. Her father, Chalmers "Pat" Fisher, was an Irish Quaker who worked as a journalist and businessman.

Bridget spent a year in Geneva in the late 1930s before serving as a nurse with the Voluntary Aid Detachment during World War II. During this time she met Douglas Gilling, an Australian serving in the Royal Australian Navy; they were engaged three days after they met and married eleven days later, and they both moved to Australia in 1946.

The Gillings settled in Castlecrag, and had four children. Bridget graduated from the University of Sydney in social work in 1971, and was appointed to the Social Security Appeals Tribunal, the Mental Health Review Tribunal, and as an ombudsman in the New South Wales prison system. She was chair of the Australian Consumers Association board, and was also involved with the Prison Reform Council, the Australian Council of Social Service, the Women's Electoral Lobby, the Council for Civil Liberties, and Zero Population Growth. She was president of the Humanist Society and the Voluntary Euthanasia Society, and ran for several elections during the early 1970s as a member of the Australia Party. In 1975 she joined the Australian Labor Party, remaining an active member until her death.

Gilling received particular attention as a campaigner for birth control and abortion law reform. She was also involved in the campaign against the Hawke Government's Australia Card proposal in 1987, becoming a trustee of the Australian Privacy Foundation. She separated from her husband in the 1970s but they remained on good terms. She died at a nursing home in the Blue Mountains in 2009 and was survived by her ex-husband and their children, who included the actress Rebecca Gilling.
