= Catherine Hunt =

English politician and activist (1854–1948)

Dame Catherine Hunt DBE JP

Mayor of Colchester
- In office 1924–1925

Personal details
- Born: Catherine Reeve Hawkins; 22 December 1854 England
- Died: 18 October 1948 (aged 93)

Dame Catherine Reeve Hunt DBE JP (née Hawkins; 22 December 1854 – 18 October 1948) was an English politician and activist who was mayor of Colchester, Essex, in 1924–25.

Hunt was born in 1854, the daughter of Charles Henry Hawkins, of Maitlands, Colchester and Sarah Jane, daughter of John Bawtree, of Abberton, Essex. Her father was mayor of Colchester four times (1848–49, 1865–66, 1870–71, 1871–72). She married Dr Edgar Atlee Hunt, her aunt's widower, in 1896. Hunt and his first wife, Charlotte Mary Bawtree, were the grandparents of actress Elizabeth Inglis and great-grandparents of American actress Sigourney Weaver.

She was a member of Colchester's Town Council from 1918 to 1934, elected its first female alderman, and served as Colchester's second female mayor in 1924.

For many years she served as chairman of the Colchester branch of the Soldiers' and Sailors' Families Association and the Colchester Local War Pensions Committee. For these services she was appointed Dame Commander of the Order of the British Empire (DBE) in the 1920 civilian war honours.

== Footnotes ==
Political offices
Preceded by Catherine Alderton	Mayor of Colchester; 1924–25	Succeeded by Arthur Piper
Party political offices
Preceded by Eleanor Acland	President of the Women's Liberal Federation; 1931–1932	Succeeded by Margaret Wintringham
