= Run4Fun =

The Run4Fun (Colchester) is a 2.5 miles (4.0 km) fun run around Colchester Castle Park and attracts around 500 entries each year. Run4Fun entrants tend to come from local Colchester businesses and individuals. Between 2002 and 2008, Run4Fun has contributed almost £54,000 to the chosen charities of the Mayor of Colchester, averaging more than £8000 each year. All the money goes to the Mayor's chosen charities for that year.

== Run4Fun 2009 ==
The 2009 run is due to take place on Thursday 17 September in Colchester Castle Park. The run begins outside the Cricket Ground and goes up into the park, around Colchester Castle. Runners assemble at 6.00pm and the run is started by the Mayor at 6.15pm. Entry fees are £10 for Over 16s, £5 for 16 and under. There's also a 10% discount if you enter 10 or more runners. All the entry fees and sponsorship goes to the Mayor of Colchester's charities; administration fees are handled by the event's sponsor. The theme is the Wild West, and entry is handled by the run's sponsor, Birkett Long LLP, a local firm of solicitors.

== Prizes ==
The evening ends with a prize-giving, led by the Mayor of Colchester. Prizes are awarded for the Fastest Male, Fastest Female, Fastest Team, Top 3 under 12s, Best "Wild West" Fancy Dress and Largest Organisation Entry. All runners are also entered into a Grand Prize Draw to win a hamper of prizes from local shops and businesses.
