= Peta Toppano =

Australian actress, singer and dancer

- Born: Peita Margaret Toppano; 1951 (age 74–75); Finsbury Park, London, England, United Kingdom
- Other name: Pieta Toppano
- Occupations: Actress; singer; dancer
- Years active: 1968–2009
- Known for: The Young Doctors as Dr. Gail Henderson; Prisoner as Karen Travers; Return to Eden as Jilly Stewart; Home and Away as Helen Poulos
- Spouse: Barry Quin (m. 1979; div. 1989) Kerry Stokes (m. 1992; div. 1995)

Peita Margaret Toppano (born 1951) known as Peta Toppano is an English-born Australian former actress, singer and dancer. She is most widely known for her roles in television soap operas The Young Doctors as Dr. Gail Henderson, Prisoner, as Karen Travers, Return to Eden as Jilly Stewart, Heartbreak High as Stella Ioannou and briefly Home and Away as Helen Poulos.

== Early life ==
Toppano was born in Finsbury Park, London, England in 1951, and grew up in Cammeray, New South Wales. She is the daughter of Enzo Toppano, a child performer and musician of Italian descent and Margaret Joan "Peggy" (nee Mortimer) (1927-2003), an Australian vaudevillian, singer, dancer, actress, composer and lyricist, who married in 1950. She has two younger brothers, Lorenzo and Dean.

At 16, Toppano won a ballet scholarship to study in Cannes, Southern France. She returned to Australia to study drama at the Ensemble Theatre under director Hayes Gordon and. appeared in a J. C. Williamson production of Snow White and the Seven Dwarfs

== Career ==
=== Television and film ===
Toppano's television credits include Lena in Piccolo Mondo for SBS, in Prisoner, as original character Karen Travers (a role created for her by producer/writer Reg Watson); in All the Rivers Run, as Eunice Pyke; and in Fields of Fire, as Gina Agostini. Other appearances include Heartbreak High as Stella on Network Ten and in Bordertown for ABC Television as Diomira.

She also appeared in A Country Practice, G.P., E Street and The Flying Doctors. She played Kate in the ABC miniseries The Paper Man with Oliver Tobias, John Bach and Rebecca Gilling (her co-star from Return to Eden), and starred with John Waters and Cybill Shepherd in the 1991 miniseries Which Way Home. Toppano played a recast Jilly Stewart in Return to Eden and starred in Home and Away as Helen Poulos.

Film credits include Seeing Red, Harbour Beat and Echoes of Paradise, directed by Phillip Noyce. Toppano was nominated for an AFI Award for her work in Street Hero, directed by Michael Pattinson with Vince Colosimo. Other nominations include The Sydney Theatre Critic's Award for her performance in Danny and the Deep Blue Sea. Toppano received two Logie nominations for her work in Fields of Fire as Gina Agostini, and Uke in Water Under the Bridge.

=== Stage (drama and musicals) ===
Toppano she played Juanita in Sue Woolf’s multi-award-winning novel Leaning Towards Infinity in 1997, adapted for stage at the Ensemble Theatre.

While living in Perth, Toppano played Coral and later Gwen in Michael Gow’s Away, Ruth in Louis Nowra’s Così for the Black Swan Theatre Company and Blood Moon for Theatre West.

She starred in a one-woman play written by Heather Nimmo, directed by Leith Taylor called One Small Step. Toppano played Countess De Lage in The Women by Clare Boothe Luce with students from Theatre Nepean, directed by Mary-Ann Gifford.

She played Beth in Merrily We Roll Along for the Sydney Theatre Company.2025

Toppano played Fantine in Les Misérables for the Cameron Mackintosh organisation in Melbourne, Perth and Brisbane, Diana Morales in A Chorus Line for two years in Sydney and Melbourne. She played Sonia in They're Playing Our Song in the UK, and celebrated her 21st birthday in Godspell.

She played Claudia in the musical Nine, Eliza Doolittle (with Stuart Wagstaff) in My Fair Lady, Monica in I Love My Wife, Roberta in Danny and the Deep Blue Sea and Leonarda in Love and Magic in Mama's Kitchen at the Belvoir St Theatre directed by Teresa Crea.

== Personal life ==
Toppano was married aged 18 to musician Peter O'Toole, and to her Prisoner co-star Barry Quin (who portrayed Dr. Greg Miller) from 1979 to 1989, and subsequently TV executive and billionaire business mogul Kerry Stokes.

Toppano suffered from cancer in 1996 and had to undergo a hysterectomy

In 2005, now semi-retired from show-business she revealed she was working a regular $17 an hour job at David Jones at the china and crystal counter, she retired in 2009 but continued to work behind the scenes in community theatre.

== Filmography ==
=== Television ===
Year	Program	Role	Notes
1968	Homicide	Marika Lucas	Season 5, episode 20
1975	Class of '75	Gina Ferrari	
1976	Rush	Drusilla	Season 2, episode 3
1976	Alvin Purple	Angelica	Season 1, episode 13
1976	King's Men	Policewoman	Season 1, episode 6
1976	The Outsiders	Sally Gower	Season 1, episode 9
1976–1977	The Young Doctors	Dr. Gail Henderson	
1979	The Franky Doyle Story	Karen Travers	TV film
1979	Skyways	Sister Theresa	1 episode
1979–1980	Prisoner	Karen Travers	Seasons 1–2, 79 episodes
1980	Water Under the Bridge	Uke	Miniseries
1981	Sara Dane	Alison Barwell	Miniseries
1981	Bellamy	Meredith	Season 1, episode 16
1981	Holiday Island	Madeleine Powell	3 episodes
1982	MPSIB	Lisa Hesse	
1983	Carson's Law	Judith Taylor	2 episodes
1985	Return to Eden	Jilly Stewart	22 episodes
1987	The Flying Doctors	Carol Brett	1 episode
1987	Fields of Fire II	Gina	Miniseries, 3 episodes
1988	Fields of Fire III	Gina	Miniseries, 2 episodes
1988	Rafferty's Rules		1 episode
1989	E Street	Miki Fallon	
1989	G.P.	Anna Carrelli	10 episodes
1989	All the Rivers Run II	Eunice Pike	Miniseries
1990	The Paper Man	Kate Cromwell	Miniseries
1990	Harbour Beat	Mrs. De Santos	TV film
1991	Which Way Home	Annie	Miniseries
1991	A Country Practice	Colleen Nicholls	4 episodes
1991	Six Pack	Lena	Miniseries, 1 episode: "Piccolo Mondo"
1994	The Feds: Seduction	Brandy	TV film
1994	Heartbreak High	Stella Ioannou	20 episodes
1995	Bordertown	Diomira	Miniseries
1998	Never Tell Me Never	M.C.	TV film
2000	Above the Law	Mrs Giovanelli	1 episode
2000–2009	Home and Away	Helen Poulos	Seasons 14–15, 18 & 22, 13 episodes

=== Film ===
Year	Film	Role	Notes
1984	Street Hero	Vinnie's Mother	
1986	Echoes of Paradise (aka Shadows of the Peacock)	Judy	
1992	Seeing Red	Vivian	
2008	Footsteps in the Night	Mother	Short film

== Theatre ==
Year	Production	Role	Venue / Company
1968	Snow White and the Seven Dwarfs	Snow White	J. C. Williamson's
1972	Godspell		Ken Brodziac Productions
1976	A Very Good Year		
1976	Spats Back In Business at the Speakeasy		Dinner theatre
1976	In the Family Way		
1977–1978	A Chorus Line	Diana Morales	Sydney & Melbourne with Edgley International & J. C. Williamson's
1980	My Fair Lady	Eliza Doolittle	Delicado Production tour
1982	I Love My Wife	Monica	J. C. Williamson's
1983	They're Playing Our Song	Sonia	Canberra Theatre & UK tour
1985	You and the Night and the House Wine: the Party of a Lifetime		Rose's Nightclub, Sydney
1986–1987	Are You Lonesome Tonight?	Priscilla	Her Majesty's Theatre, Sydney, Festival Theatre, Adelaide
1987	Danny and the Deep Blue Sea	Roberta	Globe Theatre, Sydney
1987–1988	Nine	Claudia	Comedy Theatre, Melbourne, Festival Theatre, Adelaide, Lyric Theatre, Brisbane, Her Majesty's Theatre, Sydney with Nove Productions
1990–1991	Love Letters	Melissa Gardner	Playhouse, Melbourne, TN Complex, Brisbane
1990–1991	Les Misérables	Fantine	His Majesty's Theatre, Perth, Festival Theatre, Adelaide, Lyric Theatre, Brisbane with Cameron Mackintosh
1991	Love and Magic in Mamma's Kitchen	Leonarda	Belvoir St Theatre
1992	Away	Coral / Gwen	Hole in the Wall Theatre, Perth with STCWA
1992; 1994	One Small Step	Regina / various roles	Hole in the Wall Theatre, Perth with STCWA
1993	Blood Moon		Sydney Opera House & WA tour with Black Swan State Theatre Company & Theatre West
1993	The Girl's Gotta Eat		
1994	Falsettos		Sydney Opera House with STC for Sydney Festival
1995	Cosi	Ruth	Subiaco Theatre Centre, Perth with Black Swan State Theatre Company
1996	Merrily We Roll Along	Beth	University of Sydney with Sydney Theatre Company
1996	Elegance		Tilbury Hotel, Sydney
1997	The Women	Countess De Lage	Theatre Nepean, Sydney
1999	Leaning Towards Infinity	Juanita	Ensemble Theatre, Sydney
2001	The Women		Q Theatre, Penrith with Railway Street Theatre Company
