= Harbour Beat =

- Directed by: David Elfick
- Written by: Morris Gleitzman
- Based on: original idea by David Elfick
- Produced by: David Elfick; Irene Dobson
- Starring: John Hannah; Steven Vidler; Gary Day
- Cinematography: Ellery Ryan
- Production companies: Palm Beach Pictures; Zenith; Australian Film Finance Corporation
- Distributed by: Network 7
- Release date: 24 October 1990 (TV)
- Running time: 87 minutes
- Country: Australia
- Language: English
- Budget: $3.3 million

Harbour Beat is a 1990 Scottish-Australian crime drama film, written by Morris Gleitzman, which marked the directorial debut of David Elfick and the first film appearance of John Hannah.

== Plot ==
Detective Neal McBride (Hannah) get extradited down under after the rugged pursuit (and later arrest) of a local councillor ends with his suspension from the force. Upon his arrival in Australia, he is teamed up with Detective Lance Cooper (Vidler), and goes undercover in an attempt to crack a local property developer using a bent ex-cop to plant drugs on unsuspecting victims.

== Release ==
The film was never commercially released in cinemas, instead premiering on Network 7 in Australia on October 24, 1990, and later in the UK on February 8, 1991 on STV Central.

The film was also broadcast terrestrially in the United States, Germany and the Netherlands, as well as being released on VHS there. An Australian DVD release followed in 2018.

== Cast ==
- John Hannah as Detective Neal McBride
- Steve Vidler as Detective Lance Cooper
- Gary Day as Senior Detective Gavin Walker
- Bill Young as Sergeant Cimino
- Emily Simpson as Constable Mason
- Tony Poli as Andrew De Santos
- Angie Milliken as Simone
- Rhondda Findleton as Carol Walker
- Peta Toppano as Mrs De Santos

== Production ==
Set primarily in Sydney, with scenes also filmed on location in Glasgow, $1.4 million of the budget for the film came from the Film Finance Corporation.

== Soundtrack ==
The film's title theme was entitled "Hard to Beat", and was written and performed by Russell Morris.
