= The Blue Lightning =

- Directed by: Lee Philips
- Written by: William Kelly
- Produced by: Ross Matthews
- Starring: Sam Elliott; Rebecca Gilling; John Meillon; Robert Coleby; Max Phipps; Robert Culp; Jack Davis
- Production companies: Roadshow, Coote & Carroll
- Distributed by: Channel 7
- Release date: 1986
- Running time: 96 mins
- Country: Australia
- Language: English
- Budget: $2.55 million

The Blue Lightning is a 1986 Australian film directed by Lee Philips and starring Sam Elliott, Rebecca Gilling, John Meillon, Robert Coleby, Max Phipps, and Robert Culp. It was created for US network television and was filmed in Broken Hill, Sydney, the Blue Mountains and Camden.

== Plot ==
Easygoing San Francisco private detective Harold "Harry" Wingate gets a six-figure offer from millionaire Brutus Cathcart to travel to Australia and retrieve Cathcart's prized opal from former Irish Republican Army terrorist sharpshooter Lester McInally. With the help of an Aborigine rancher and revenge-minded widow Kate McQueen, Wingate battles McInally and his minions, who have taken over an entire outback town.

== Cast ==
- Sam Elliott as Harold 'Harry' Wingate
- Robert Culp as Lester McInally
- Jack Davis as Jahrgadu
- Peter Ford as Quentin McQueen
- Rebecca Gilling as Kate McQueen
- John Meillon as Dr William Giles
- Robert Coleby as Norman
- Max Phipps as Brutus Cathcart
- Ernie Dingo as Pekeri
- Garry Who as Mechanic
- Gary Waddell as Hennessey

== Reception ==
Bryan-College Station Eagle's Jim Butler writes "The Blue Lightning is nothing but two-hours of cartoon violence played without humor" Barbara Hooks in the Age "The first, and hopefully the last, movie for CBS network television to be filmed in Australia, it represents not so much a civilised exchange between the Australian and United States television industries as a cultural smash and grab raid." She finishes "No one expects American telemovies be "art house". But if Australians are involved in making them then they should at least avoid insulting the intelligence of Australian audiences." Commenting in the Sydney Morning Herald Richard Glover says "it was as bad as everybody said it was" and notes that Jack Davis was revoiced in the final production.
