= Opéra imaginaire =

- DVD cover showing a scene of the "Flower Duet" (from Lakmé) segment
- Narrated by: Ruggero De Pas / James Smillie
- Country of origin: France
- Original language: French

Production
- Animators: Ken Lidster; Monique Renault; Pascal Roulin; Jonathan Hills; Jimmy T. Murakami; Raimund Krumme; Stephen Palmer; Hilary Audus; Guionne Leroy; José Abel
- Running time: 51 minutes
- Production companies: Pascavision; Club d'Investissement Média; Institut national de l'audiovisuel (INA); Miramar Productions

Original release
- Release: 1993

Opéra imaginaire ("an opera for the imagination" in English) is a 1993 live-action animated musical anthology television film. It has been compared to films like Fantasia (1940) and Allegro non troppo (1976), and consists of 12 different segments which are based on different popular operas. It was nominated for best production at the CableACE Awards in 1994 and for an Annie Award for Best Animated Home Entertainment Production at the 23rd Annie Awards in 1995.

== Presentation ==
The presentation of Opera imaginaire is delivered by the narrator, who introduces the program as a celebration of 400 years of opera and presents a selection of his favorite works. This presentation mentions several notable figures and characters from the operatic repertoire, including the character Lakmé, the villain Baron Scarpia, and the opera Pagliacci, and also pays tribute to the Italian tenor Enrico Caruso. The narrator describes the settings as the fictional Opéra Imaginaire where the program takes place.

== Segments ==
The film begins with "Je crois entendre encore" (from Georges Bizet's opera Les pêcheurs de perles) playing, while screenshots from each of the 12 segments appear.

1. "Vesti la giubba", from Ruggero Leoncavallo's opera Pagliacci, sung by Enrico Caruso (in 1902) in the aria's introduction and Franco Corelli (in 1960) throughout the rest of it. A stop motion animation based on the opera with a dark comedy theme and the characters rendered as circus clowns. A "happier" ending is shown with the 2D-animated ghost of Nedda reconciling with a rather obese Canio after he had "accidentally" killed her. Directed by Ken Lidster.
2. "La donna è mobile", from Giuseppe Verdi's opera Rigoletto, sung by Nicolai Gedda. In the crimson heart of the wine in his glass, the (live-acted) Duke of Mantua embarks on a 2D fantasy in which he sees hand-drawn animated nude women based on those who come from famous paintings by French painters. Directed by Monique Renault.
3. "Avec la garde montante", from Bizet's opera Carmen, sung by Les Petits Chanteurs à la Croix de Bois with the Opéra National de Paris, and conducted by Rafael Frühbeck de Burgos in 1970. Carmen (live-acted) lays down her tarot cards which through CGI spring to life with the images the cards each depicting one of her choices from the opera: Don José, Escamillo, or Death. Directed by Pascal Roulin and Christophe Vallaux.
4. "Voi che sapete", from Wolfgang Amadeus Mozart's opera The Marriage of Figaro, sung by Suzanne Danco. A tribute to Cherubino's cross-dressing adventures, rendered through paper cut-out style animation against CGI backgrounds. Directed by Pascal Roulin.
5. "Un bel dì, vedremo", from Giacomo Puccini's opera Madama Butterfly, sung by Felicia Weathers. The story of Cio-Cio-San's tragedy is rendered through animation in the style of traditional Japanese watercolors. Directed by Jonathan Hills.
6. "Au fond du temple saint", also from Bizet's Les pêcheurs de perles, sung by Nicolai Gedda and Ernest Blanc. A wispy, black-and-white, rotoscoped animation depicting a condensed version of the opera's plot set to its famous aria. Directed by Jimmy T. Murakami.
7. "Bald prangt, den Morgen zu verkünden ... Du also bist mein Bräutigam", from Mozart's opera The Magic Flute, sung by Lucia Popp. A 2D-style CGI animated, geometrical version of the scene of Pamina's attempt at suicide and subsequent discovery of Tamino in the Temple of Ordeal, with all the characters' bodies rendered in geometrical shapes on an ever-shifting stage. Directed by Raimund Krumme.
8. "Questo è un nodo avviluppato", from Gioachino Rossini's opera La Cenerentola, sung in sextet in 1963 by Giulietta Simionato, Ugo Benelli, Sesto Bruscantini, Dora Carra, Miti Truccato Pace, and Paolo Montarsolo with the Orchestra of the Maggio Musicale Fiorentino, and conducted by Oliviero De Fabritiis. A sunny take on the opera and the Cinderella fairy tale through hand-drawn animation with the characters randomly assuming each other's identities, as well as those of characters from other fairy tales, including "Goldilocks and the Three Bears", "Little Red Riding Hood", and "The Three Little Pigs". Directed by Stephen Palmer.
9. "Le veau d'or", from Charles Gounod's opera Faust, sung by Nicolai Ghiaurov. A hand-drawn, sketchy rendition of the ill-fated romance between Faust and Marguerite as the booming voice of Mephistopheles, who manipulates them like puppets, sings throughout the sequence. Directed by Hilary Audus.
10. "Noi siamo zingarelle", from Verdi's opera La traviata, sung by the Chorus of the Accademia Nazionale di Santa Cecilia of Rome, and conducted by Francesco Molinari-Pradelli. An unrelated visual version of the opera with stop motion claymation sweets attempting to bring colour to a world made of white cake. Directed by Guionne Leroy.
11. "Flower Duet", from Léo Delibes's opera Lakmé, sung by Mady Mesplé and Danielle Millet with the Orchestre du Théâtre national de l'Opéra Comique, and conducted by Alain Lombard. A rendition of the opera in which Lakmé's arms and hands, through CGI, turn into various flora and fauna that are found in the jungles of India, including a tree, a cobra, a deer, a bird, a leopard, a woman's arm with bracelets, a rock, a human, a boat, a clump of reeds, and others, as Gérald (live-acted) meets Lakmé (live-acted) in the temple. Directed by Pascal Roulin.
12. "E lucevan le stelle", from Puccini's opera Tosca, sung by Carlo Bergonzi. An eerie hand-drawn animation depicting Cavaradossi's final hours of life observed by the angel of death and Baron Scarpia's attempted advance on Tosca. Directed by José Abel.

During the end credits, the film closes again with Bizet's "Je crois entendre encore", while the same screenshots from each of the 12 segments shown in the beginning reappear.

== Cast ==
- Ana Lucia Alves as Carmen
- Sébastien Chollet as Zurga
- Franco Corelli as Canio
- Alain de Greffe as Gerald
- Mehdi Manglunki as Nadir
- Bernard Marbaix as the Duke of Mantua
- Fundji Ngelessy as Lakmé
- Rubina Owadally as Leila
- Ruggero De Pas as Narrator (James Smillie in English dubbing)
