= Marie Corbett =

British suffragette

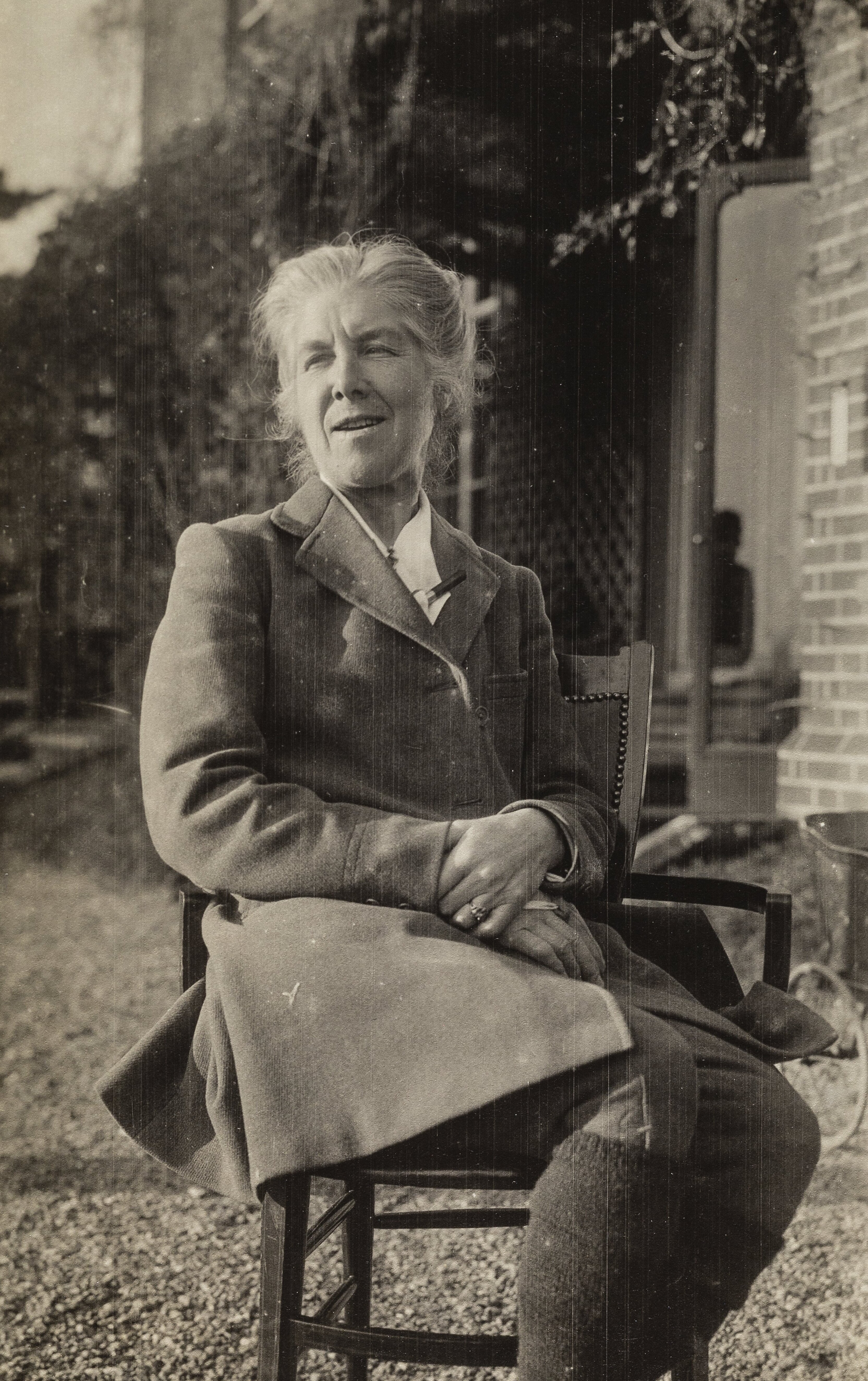
- Born: Marie Grey; 30 April 1859; Kensington, London, England, United Kingdom of Great Britain and Ireland
- Died: 28 March 1932 (aged 72)
- Occupations: Suffragist, Member of LG
- Spouse: Charles Corbett
- Children: Cicely Corbett Fisher; Margery Corbett Ashby
- Family: Bridget Gilling (grand-daughter)

Marie Corbett (née Gray; 30 April 1859 – 28 March 1932) was an English suffragist, local government worker and supporter of the Liberal Party.

== Biography ==
Born as Marie Gray in Kennington, London, the daughter of George and Eliza Gray from Tunbridge Wells. George Gray was a successful businessman who became rich through importing fruit and producing confectionery. He and his wife Eliza were strong supporters of the Liberal Party who championed many progressive causes.

In 1881, Marie Gray married Charles Corbett, a barrister. Corbett was later elected Liberal MP for East Grinstead sitting from 1906 until January 1910. They had two daughters and a son. Their daughters were Dame Margery Corbett Ashby, an international feminist campaigner and Liberal Parliamentary candidate, and Cicely Corbett Fisher, a suffragist and workers' rights activist.

== Politics ==
Marie Corbett shared her parents' and her husband's politics and was a stalwart member of the Women's Liberal Federation (WLF). She was a member of the Burgess Hill branch from 1905-09 and was sometime President of the Danehill and East Grinstead branch.

Charles Corbett strongly supported votes for women. He was a partisan in Parliament of the National Union of Women's Suffrage Societies and a vigorous campaigner outside. In 1913, he helped to form the East Grinstead branch of the Men's League for Women's Suffrage. Like her husband and her famous daughter, Marie Corbett was more radical on women's suffrage issues than the mainstream WLF. She was a friend of Louisa Martindale and close to other Liberal feminists.

In 1904, with Margery and her other daughter Cicely, she travelled to Berlin to attend an International Women's’ Suffrage conference and in 1907, again with Margery, she left the WLF to form the Liberal Women's Suffrage Group. The Corbett family's opinions and campaigning on the question of votes for women often attracted hostility in the traditionally conservative area of East Grinstead.

Marie and her two feminist daughters were among those such as Helen MacRae, Lilla Durham, and Mary Sackville who founded the East Grinstead Suffrage Society associated with the Women's Social and Political Union suffragettes and often made public speeches on the subject of women's rights in East Grinstead High Street. At one point, the group were pelted with rotten food on a parade in the town.

East Grinstead was traditionally a safe Conservative seat and the crowds were usually very hostile. A survey carried out in 1911 suggested that less than 20% of the women in East Grinstead supported women having the vote in parliamentary elections. This may have been one factor in Charles Corbett's loss of his seat in the January 1910 general election where the Tory candidate was said to have inflicted a crushing defeat. In 1908, Marie Corbett became honorary secretary of the Forward Suffrage Movement Within the Women's Liberal Federation, a group founded by Eva McLaren and Frances Heron Maxwell to concentrate the suffrage efforts of Liberal women inside the Liberal Party and through the WLF. As a delegate of this group she attended a congress in Budapest in 1913 organised by the International Women's Suffrage Alliance.

== Local government welfare work ==
Mrs Corbett championed poor relief. She was a member of the Uckfield Board of guardians for 36 years, one of the first women poor law guardians and was also recorded as being the first woman to serve as a Rural district councillor in Uckfield. As part of her work she saw to it that all children were removed from the Workhouse and placed with foster parents.

She was a founder of the Ashdown Forest Boarding-Out Committee for Poor Law Children. She also co-founded and was Secretary of the East Grinstead Women's Soroptimist Society.
