= Return to Eden =

Australian drama and soap opera television series

- Series title screen
- Genre: Soap opera Drama
- Created by: Michael Laurence
- Starring: Rebecca Gilling; James Reyne; Daniel Abineri; James Smillie; Peta Toppano; Daniel Abineri
- Composer: Brian May
- Country of origin: Australia
- Original language: English
- No. of episodes: Mini-series: 3 Weekly series: 22

Production
- Producers: Hal McElroy; Tim Sanders
- Production locations: Arnhem Land; Darling Downs; Great Barrier Reef; Jimbour Homestead; Sydney
- Running time: Mini-series: 3 × 90 minutes Weekly series: 22 × 45 minutes
- Production companies: Hanna-Barbera Australia; McElroy & McElroy; Eden Productions; Taft-Hardie
- Budget: AUS$2.75 million (mini-series); AUS$8 million (weekly series)

Original release
- Network: Network Ten; Syndication
- Release: 26 September – 28 September 1983 (Mini-series: Melbourne)
- Release: 27 September – 29 September 1983 (Mini-series: Sydney)
- Release: 10 February – 9 June 1986 (Weekly series: Sydney)
- Release: 13 February – 10 July 1986 (Weekly series: Melbourne)

Return to Eden is an Australian television drama series starring Rebecca Gilling, James Reyne, Wendy Hughes and James Smillie. It began as a three-part, six-hour mini-series shown on Network Ten on September 26-28 September 1983 in Melbourne, and 27–29 September 1983 in Sydney. Gilling and Smillie reprised their roles, with Peta Toppano replacing Hughes, for a 22-part weekly series that began airing on 10 February 1986 in Sydney and 13 February 1986 in Melbourne.

Return to Eden was created by Michael Laurence; it was an international success, particularly in Russia and France, where it has been shown 13 times.

== Mini-series (1983) ==
=== Synopsis ===
My name is Stephanie Harper, and this is Eden – here my father was king. On the day he died 17 years ago, I was 23, lonely and afraid. If I'd known then of the nightmare that lay ahead, I think I'd have chosen to die with him.

Stephanie Harper (Gilling) is a dull, frumpy 40-year-old heiress. Rich but insecure, and with two teenage children and two failed marriages behind her, she marries a handsome but unscrupulous younger man, tennis pro Greg Marsden (Reyne). Stephanie believes that she has found true love, but after the wedding, Greg promptly begins an affair with Stephanie's best friend Jilly Stewart (Hughes). Greg then plots to get rid of Stephanie and lay claim to her fortune. Whilst on their honeymoon, Greg pushes Stephanie into a crocodile-infested river, and he and Jilly watch as she is apparently mauled to death.

However, Stephanie miraculously survives and is later found washed up on the river bank by hermit Dave Welles (Bill Kerr). Dave nurses Stephanie back to health, but her face and body are horrifically scarred from the encounter with the crocodile. Dave gives her precious gems that he mined locally, so that she can use them to try to move on with her life. Stephanie sells the gems and goes to an island clinic where she meets Dr. Dan Marshall (Smillie), a brilliant plastic surgeon who uses his talents to repair her face and body. After months of operations and physical exercise, Stephanie has been transformed into a very beautiful woman. Using the new alias of Tara Welles, given to her by Dave, Stephanie returns to Sydney and becomes a glamorous supermodel who later appears on the cover of Vogue. Using her new identity and fortune, she plots her revenge on both Greg and Jilly and aims to take back what is rightfully hers, particularly her beloved family home Eden, a vast mansion estate in the Northern Territory.

=== Production ===
The mini-series was shot in Sydney, the Darling Downs, the Barrier Reef and Arnhem Land and had a budget of AUS$2.5 million. The Eden property itself was shot on location at Jimbour Homestead. American director Karen Arthur directed the mini-series.

=== Reception ===
The mini-series was a huge ratings success in Australia, earning a share of 42%.

== Weekly series (1986) ==
Such was the enormous success of the mini-series that Return to Eden returned as a regular weekly series. Produced in 1985 and screened on TV in 1986, the weekly series had a budget of AUS$8 million.

The events of the series take place seven years after the end of the original mini-series, with Stephanie now married to Dr. Dan Marshall and living at New Eden, a mansion in Sydney. Stephanie's children, Sarah and Dennis, both teenagers in the mini-series, are now adults, played by Nicki Paull and Peter Cousens. The opening episode featured Jilly's release from prison and the discovery that she is Stephanie's half-sister. Ongoing storylines dealt with her bitter jealousy and rivalry with Stephanie as she strives to take what she believes should rightfully be hers. The most prominent storyline was Stephanie's continued attempts to keep control of the family company, Harper Mining, which ruthless businessman Jake Sanders (Daniel Abineri) was trying to take away from her. It was revealed that Jake was in fact the brother of the late Greg Marsden, out to avenge his death. He eventually teamed up with Jilly to achieve his goal. Rebecca Gilling and James Smillie both reprised their roles from the original mini-series, while Peta Toppano replaced Wendy Hughes as Jilly Stewart, playing her as a glamorous, scheming "superbitch", much in the style of Dynasty's Alexis Colby.

=== Ending ===
The final episode screened in Australia concluded with a cliffhanger ending in anticipation of a second season. Closing scenes featured Dennis being knocked unconscious and kidnapped by an unseen assailant, meanwhile, upstairs at Stephanie's mansion while a party went on downstairs, Jilly pulls a gun on Stephanie in an attempt to kill her. Jake attempts to wrest the gun from Jilly but the gun goes off in the struggle, fatally wounding him and splattering Stephanie with his blood. Stephanie grabs the gun away from Jilly, while Jake careens down the hallway before falling down the stairs where he dies in full view of the shocked party guests. A horrified Stephanie, with blood on her face and clothes and still holding the gun in her hand, appears at the stairway. Jilly then descends the stairs, claiming to have seen Stephanie shoot him.

The show's ratings had not been high enough in Australia to justify a renewal so this cliffhanger was never initially resolved for Australian audiences. The actors playing Stephanie, Jilly and Dennis were later brought back to film a five-minute conclusion to the various unresolved storylines that was added to the end of the final episode in order to bring the series to a close. Dennis' abductor is revealed as Chris (Graham Harvey), his half-brother and Stephanie and Amahl's long-lost son, who abandons his plan to hold Dennis for ransom when he is told he would stand to inherit millions. Chris is revealed to have witnessed the shooting incident from the bedroom balcony at Eden, and taken photographs that prove Stephanie's innocence. Stephanie is released while Jilly is arrested for Jake's murder.

This new ending was never seen in the original Australian run and only included in the version of the last episode that was sold internationally. Network Ten repeated the series twice in the 1990s and at least one screening contained this revised ending.

== International distribution ==
=== United Kingdom ===
Return to Eden was screened on ITV and was a huge ratings hit during the summer of 1986 (the three-part mini-series had been screened in September 1984). The 1986 UK transmission also ended with the original cliffhanger, as did the 1989 repeat screening. However, the newer ending was screened many years later when the series was repeated on UK satellite television, primarily the now defunct Granada Plus, which showed it twice. It was shown again in the UK in 2010 by the satellite channel CBS Drama, which showed both the original 1983 mini-series and immediately followed this with the 1986 sequel series which included the revised ending.

=== India ===
Return to Eden was remade in India as the 1988 film Khoon Bhari Maang. It starred Rekha and was directed and produced by Rakesh Roshan. The film was a critical as well as box office success.

=== Indonesia ===
Return to Eden was broadcast by TVRI between 1987 and 1988. This series subsequently inspired local Indonesian producers to produce television series of a similar genre. During that period, production houses in Indonesia were still hesitant to produce television series, while only one television station was in operation at the time, namely TVRI.

=== Iraq ===
Return to Eden was broadcast by the National Television of Iraq (Channel 1) between 1989 and 1990, it had an Arabic subtitle added by the national TV of Iraq prior to broadcast.

=== South Korea ===
In 2014, the South Korean webseries Birth of a Beauty was made, adapting the story of Return to Eden (and Khoon Bhari Maang). The plot of a wife taking revenge on the husband who had tried to kill her was kept intact.

=== France ===
The mini-series and the weekly series were screened on TF1 under the title "La Vengeance aux deux visages" (Revenge with two faces) and are regularly rerun on French TV channels, or available on streaming service.

== Cast ==
Main cast (Opening credits)
Recurring guest star (3+ episodes)
Guest star (1–2 episodes)

Role	Miniseries	Weekly series
Starring
Stephanie Harper	Rebecca Gilling	Rebecca Gilling
Greg Marsden	James Reyne	
Jilly Stewart	Wendy Hughes	Peta Toppano
Dr. Dan Marshall	James Smillie	James Smillie
Jake Sanders		Daniel Abineri
Dennis Harper	Jayson Duncan	Peter Cousens
Cassie Jones		Megan Williams
Tom McCaster		Warren Blondell
Sarah Harper	Nicole Pyner	Nicki Paull
Angelo Vitale		Angelo D'Angelo
Bill McMaster	Peter Gwynne	Peter Gwynne
Guest starring
Joanna Randall	Olivia Hamnett	Olivia Hamnett
Philip Stewart	John Lee	John Lee
Dave Welles	Bill Kerr	Bill Kerr

=== Miniseries ===
The 1983 miniseries stars Rebecca Gilling as Stephanie Harper, a multi-millionairess who reemerges as the superstar model "Tara Welles", James Reyne as Greg Marsden, her younger husband, Wendy Hughes as Jilly Stewart, her best friend and James Smillie as Dr. Dan Marshall, her plastic surgeon.

Guest stars include Olivia Hamnett as Joanna Randall, head of modelling agency, Patricia Kennedy as Katy Basklain, Stephanie's housekeeper and maternal figure, Bill Kerr as Dave Welles, bushman who saves Stephanie, and Peter Gwynne as Bill McMaster, general manager of Harper Mining. Also appearing is Chris Haywood as Jason Peebles, John Lee as Philip Stewart, Jilly's husband, Jennifer Nairn-Smith as Lisa, Benita Collings as Estelle Rutherford and Sheila Kennelly as Lizzie.

=== Weekly series ===
Rebecca Gilling, James Smillie and Peter Gwynne return as Stephanie Harper, Dr. Dan Marshall and Bill McMaster in 1986 weekly series, with Peta Toppano taking over the role of Jilly. Stephanie's children Dennis and Sarah are now young adults and recast with Peter Cousens and Nicki Paull.

New characters include Daniel Abineri as Jake Sanders, Stephanie's business rival who is revealed as Greg's brother, Megan Williams as Cassie Jones, employee at Harper Mining, Warren Blondell as Tom McMaster, Bill's handsome son, and Angelo D'Angelo as Angelo Vitale, aspiring boxer and Dennis's friend.

Olivia Hamnett, John Lee and Bill Kerr return as Joanna Randall, Philip Stewart and Dave Welles. Recurring characters include Ann Brisk as Hilary, receptionist at Harper Mining, John Ley as Tony Taylor, Angelo's manager, Suzanne Roylance as Olive Down, Jilly's friend from prison, Rod Anderson as Anton Parker, Jake's lawyer, Barry Davies as Roberts, Stephanie's butler, Wendy Playfair as Rena McMaster, Bill's wife and Tom's mother, Robin Ramsay as Sheik Amahl, Stephanie's old friend and business partner, Saskia Post as Jessica Stewart, Philip's niece, Keith Aberdein as Johnno Ryan and Tamasin Ramsay as Princess Talitha, Amahl's sister.

== Home media ==
Both the original mini-series and the follow-up weekly series have been made available on DVD in Australia. Kaleidoscope Film has released the original 1983 mini-series as two "Region 0" discs. The picture quality of the discs is low, as it was reproduced from many generations of copies from the master. Bonus extras on the discs include interviews with Rebecca Gilling and James Reyne in 2001.

The 1986 series was released as a six-disc set in Australia by MRA Entertainment. The DVD boxset does not include the revised ending, leaving the last episode with the unresolved original cliffhanger.

The series has also been released on DVD in the Netherlands in a nine-disc set, which contains the revised ending.

In 2018 MediumRare released the original mini-series in a two disc boxset in Europe. The picture quality in this release is of higher quality than the previous release.

In January 2021, a new 10-disc DVD box set of the original 1983 mini-series and the 1986 sequel series was released in Australia & internationally by Via Vision. This release contains the revised ending. The picture quality of the 1986 TV series is an improvement over all previous releases of the series.

== Remake attempt ==
In 2012, the Nine Network announced it was planning to remake Return to Eden as a six-hour mini-series, however in March 2013 it was announced that the planned remake had been shelved for the time being due to financial reasons.

== Soundtrack ==
A soundtrack album for the series, featuring music composed by Brian May (not to be confused with the Queen guitarist) was released on vinyl during the show's original airing. It was reissued on compact disc on the Buy Soundtrax label in 2010.

Return To Eden CD track listing
No.	Title	Length
1.	"Main Titles/Return to Eden"
2.	"The Return to Eden"
3.	"Fire and Fight"
4.	"Problem for Dan and Steph"
5.	"Lord of All"
6.	"Big Business"
7.	"Jilly's Crack-Up"
8.	"Tara's Love Theme"
9.	"Harper's Mansion"
10.	"A Man Not A Boy"
11.	"Confrontation"
12.	"Croc Attack"
13.	"Steph Meets Jake"
14.	"Corporate Espionage"
15.	"Greg Returns"
16.	"Scheming Jilly"
17.	"Angelo's Theme"
18.	"Night Interludes"
19.	"Closing Titles"

Notes about the CD: Track 1 is actually the feature-length opening theme of Return to Eden the series, used in the first episode. Although Track 19 is labelled "Closing Titles", it is actually the series' regular opening theme music.
