= Catherine Alderton =

British politician (1869–1951)

Catherine Buchanan Alderton MBE JP
- Born: 1869
- Died: 9 November 1951 (aged 81–82)

Catherine Buchanan Alderton (1869 – 9 November 1951), was a British Liberal Party politician and suffragist. She was the first woman elected as Mayoress of Colchester.

== Background ==
Catherine Alderton was the daughter of the Reverend Thomas Robinson, minister of Lion Walk Congregational Church from 1886 to 1902. She was educated at Milton Mount College in Gravesend, Kent, an educational institution for the daughters of Congregational ministers. She qualified as a secondary school teacher and taught mathematics until 1897. She married, in 1897 Archibald William Alderton. They had one son.

== Politics ==
=== National political career ===
Alderton joined the Liberal Party. She was an active advocate of the campaign to give women the vote for parliamentary elections. She was a suffragist who believed in non-violent protest as advocated by the NUWSS. She opposed the actions of the suffragettes (WSPU) describing their tactics as "disgraceful and disreputable". In 1912 she became a national executive member of the Women's Liberal Federation. In 1913 she was a founding executive member of the Liberal Women's Suffrage Union. The organisation was created as a rallying point for women in the Liberal Party to press for votes for women. She opposed the decision of the NUWSS to extend their Elections Fighting Fund policy of campaigning against Liberal by-election candidates who supported votes for women. In 1920 she became Honorary Secretary of the national Women's Liberal Federation. After women were permitted to stand for parliament in 1918, Alderton considered standing herself. Colchester had been a Unionist seat since 1910. The constituency included more than just the borough of Colchester and was not thought to be a particularly good prospect for a Liberal.

She was deeply interested in improving labour conditions for the working class and especially women. Given that she was born in Scotland of Scottish parents, a seat in Scotland seemed appropriate. In October 1922, very much at the last minute, Alderton was adopted by Edinburgh South Liberal Association as their prospective parliamentary candidate. (There is some uncertainty about her exact affiliation. She was described at the time as an independent 'Asquith' Liberal, but subsequent Liberal Year Books described her as a 'Lloyd George' National Liberal.)

While in the 1922 campaign Labour and Liberal women declined to campaign for their parties against the UK's first female MP, the Conservative Nancy Astor, in her Plymouth Sutton constituency, one of Scotland's leading female Unionists, the Duchess of Atholl, campaigned for Alderton's opponent.

The Liberals had not won the seat since 1910 and at the 1920 Edinburgh South by-election the Unionist majority was still a reasonably comfortable 3,000. In another straight fight with a Unionist she encountered a swing against her and was out-polled by 2 to 1;

1922 General Election: Edinburgh South
Party	Candidate	Votes	%	±%
Unionist	Sir Samuel Chapman	14,843	66.7	+8.9
Liberal	Catherine Buchanan Alderton	7,408	33.3	−9.0
Majority		7,435	33.4	
Turnout		22,251	69.2	
Unionist hold		Swing	+9.0	

In 1923 she became Vice-Chairman of the Women's Liberal Federation. Upon becoming Mayor of Colchester, she decided not to contest public elections for the duration of her term. This meant that she decided not to run as a parliamentary candidate in the 1923 General Election. The following year when she served as Mayoress she also chose not contest the 1924 General Election. In March 1929, she was adopted as Liberal prospective parliamentary candidate for Hull North West. This made her the first woman to stand for parliament in Hull. The general election soon followed at which she came third, only managing to retain the Liberal vote from 1924;

1929 General Election: Hull North West
Party	Candidate	Votes	%	±%
Unionist	Albert Lambert Ward	14,764	41.6	−11.7
Labour	William Pickles	10,700	30.1	+11.9
Liberal	Catherine Buchanan Alderton	10,059	28.3	−0.2
Majority		4,064	11.5	−13.3
Turnout			79.1	−2.1
Unionist hold		Swing	-11.8	

However, it was felt that Alderton had done remarkably well at such short notice. In 1931 she was elected President of the National Women's Liberal Federation serving from 1931 to 1932. When the Liberal Party joined the National Government in 1931, there were few opportunities for Liberals to stand as candidates at the ensuing general election, and Alderton did not stand. In Colchester as in many other places, the Liberals decided not to oppose the sitting Conservative Oswald Lewis and Alderton went to the extent of publicly supporting him against his Labour challenger. Although she did not stand for parliament again she remained committed to supporting the Liberal Party, even after it left the National Government in 1933. She was the first woman to serve on the Executive Committee of the National Liberal Federation.

=== Local political career ===
In 1916 she was elected to Colchester Borough Council, the first woman to be elected to the town's council. She was appointed a Justice of the peace, serving as a Magistrate of the Borough of Colchester. In 1923 she was appointed Mayor of Colchester to serve for a year. She was the first woman to serve in this role. Colchester historians noted that this made her the most significant woman in the history of Colchester since Boudica (who led the destruction of Camulodunum — Colchester's predecessor — in AD 60). In 1924 she agreed to serve for a year as Mayoress to her widowed successor. In 1928 she shifted her interest in local government from Colchester to the Essex County Council being the first woman to be elected to that body. She served on the county council first as an elected member then much later as an Alderman. She was the first woman on the Committee of the Essex County Hospital. Her services to local government in Essex were recognised in January 1944 in the King's New Year Honours List, when she was awarded the MBE.

== Religion ==
Unsurprisingly, as a daughter of a Congregationalist Minister, she was herself a Congregationalist. She was President of the National Congregational Women's Guild of England and Wales from 1926 to 1928 and from 1928 to 1930. She was President of the National Sisterhood Movement in 1929, 1931–32 and 1934–35.

Political offices
Preceded by Percy Alan Sanders	Mayor of Colchester; 1923–24	Succeeded by Catherine Reeve Hunt
Party political offices
Preceded by Eleanor Acland	President of the Women's Liberal Federation; 1931–1932	Succeeded by Margaret Wintringham
