= Danger Down Under (film) =

- Written by: Reuben Leder
- Directed by: Russ Mayberry
- Starring: Rebecca Gilling; Lee Majors; Martin Vaughan
- Music by: Bruce Rowland
- Country of origin: Australia
- Original language: English

Production
- Producer: Jane Scott

Original release
- Network: Seven Network
- Release: 14 March 1988

Danger Down Under is a 1988 TV movie by director Russ Mayberry. It was a pilot film for the NBC network for an unmade TV series The Hawkesbury.

== Synopsis ==
Reed Harris (Lee Majors) is a successful American horse-breeder who has come to Australia on business and for one last chance to reconcile with his estranged wife Sharon and their sons.

== Cast ==
- Lee Majors as Reed Harris
- Rebecca Gilling as Sharon Harris
- Martin Vaughan as Ginger MdDowell
- Benita Collings as Dr Eileen Townsend
- Georgie Parker as Cabbie
