= Cicely Corbett Fisher =

British suffragist and workers' rights activist (1885–1959)

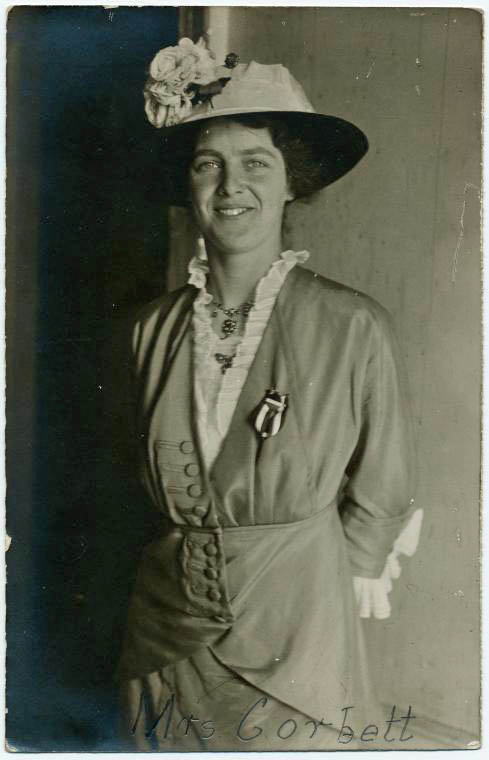
- Born: Cicely Corbett; 9 August 1885; Danehill, East Sussex, England, United Kingdom of Great Britain and Ireland
- Died: 20 January 1959 (aged 74); Danehill, Sussex, England, United Kingdom
- Education: Somerville College, Oxford
- Occupations: Suffragist and workers' rights activist
- Spouse: Chalmers Dempster Corbett Fisher (m. 1913)
- Children: Bridget Gilling (daughter)
- Parent(s): Charles Corbett (Father); Marie Corbett
- Family: Margery Corbett Ashby (sister)

Cicely Fisher (née Corbett; 9 August 1885 – 20 January 1959) was a British suffragist and workers' rights activist. She was one of the founders of the Liberal Women's Suffrage Group.

== Biography ==
Cicely Corbett was born in 1885 in Danehill, East Sussex, England to Charles Corbett, a Liberal Party politician and barrister, and Marie Corbett, a suffragist. Cicely and her older sister, Margery, were taught at home by their parents and another local woman. Both parents were outspoken supporters of women's rights, and at fifteen years of age, Cicely formed a society with her sister and their friends called the Younger Suffragists.

In 1904, she began studying modern history at Somerville College, Oxford, and there she became involved in the Oxford branch of the National Union of Women's Suffrage Societies. She and Margery left the Women's Liberal Federation due to their disappointment with the Liberal Party's commitment to women's suffrage and, with their mother, they established the Liberal Women's Suffrage Group.

After leaving university, Corbett began working for Clementina Black's organisation, the Women's Industrial Council, which campaigned for improvements in wages and conditions for working women. She also organised conferences on behalf of the National Anti-Sweating League to demand better working conditions in certain trades. She often organised speeches by exploited women workers and spoke out against child labour.

== Personal life ==
Cicily Corbett married Chalmers Dempster Corbett in 1913 (died 23 December 1952), who served with the British army with the 22nd Unit under the rank of lieutenant and then Captain and was a liberal journalist, after there marriage they both adopted the surname Corbett Fisher. They had a daughter, Bridget Gilling, in 1922, and frequently housed students and refugees in their Sussex home. In her later life, Corbett Fisher was an active member of the Labour Party and the Women's International League for Peace and Freedom before her death in 1959.

Between 1937 and 1939, Corbett owned MG K3004, which was driven on her behalf by H. Stuart-Wilton at Brooklands, Crystal Palace and Brighton Speed Trials.
