= The Paper Man (miniseries) =

- Written by: John Lonie; Keith Aberdein
- Directed by: Peter Fisk
- Starring: John Bach; Oliver Tobias; Rebecca Gilling
- Theme music composer: Chris Neal
- Country of origin: Australia
- Original language: English
- No. of episodes: 3 x 2 hours

Production
- Producer: Sue Masters

Original release
- Network: ABC
- Release: 5 September – 7 September 1990

The Paper Man is a 1990 Australian mini series about a fictitious media mogul.

== Cast ==
- John Bach as Philip Cromwell
- Oliver Tobias as Ian Harris
- Rebecca Gilling as Virginia Morgan
- Fred Parslow as Sir William Argyle
- Dennis Miller as George Slater
- Bob Baines as Barry Slater
- Barry Otto as Elliott Calder
- Peta Toppano as Kate Cromwell
- Olivia Hamnett as Irene Hampden
- Robert Taylor as Johnny Coates
- Paul Chubb as Clarry Bullock
- Michael Caton as Leonard Webb
- Richard Roxburgh as 'Gracie' Fields
- Vincent Ball as Sir Evan Mason
- Ray Barrett as Maurice Grim
- Angie Milliken as Joanna Morgan
- Gennie Nevinson as Alice Drummond
- John O'May as Victor Dove
- Pat Bishop as Marjorie Stack
