= Cygni: All Guns Blazing =

2024 video game

- Developer(s): KeelWorks
- Publisher(s): Konami
- Engine: Unreal Engine 4
- Platform(s): PlayStation 5; Windows; Xbox Series X/S
- Release: WW: August 6, 2024
- Genre(s): Scrolling shooter, bullet hell
- Mode(s): Single-player

Cygni: All Guns Blazing is a vertically scrolling bullet hell shooter developed by KeelWorks and published by Konami. Players fight waves of aliens in their spaceship via a twin-stick shooter control mechanism.

== Gameplay ==
Players control a spaceship and fight a horde of invading aliens. It is a scrolling shooter, but the continuous fire from the alien horde brings elements of bullet hell games. Players can shoot at up to a 30 degree angle using controls similar to twin-stick shooters. The players' ship has five points of shields. Each time the ship is hit, it loses a shield. More shields can be acquired as power-ups, and players can divert a point of shields to weapons, giving access to powerful rockets. Between levels, players can upgrade their ship.

== Development ==
KeelWorks, a Scottish company, previously worked on 3D animation. This is their first video game. Konami released Cygni: All Guns Blazing for Windows, PlayStation 5, and Xbox Series X/S on August 6, 2024.

== Reception ==
Cygni: All Guns Blazing received mixed reviews on Metacritic. PC Gamer compared it to the films of Michael Bay, leaving the reviewer feeling "like my senses had been jackhammered to sludge". They enjoyed the combat and praised its accessibility, though they said the number of power-ups can make some levels a bit too easy. Push Square praised the gameplay and "mind-blowing visuals" but said Cygni does not have much replay potential. In contrast, PCMag felt the ship upgrade system gave it replay value, though they found some of the upgrade options confusing, especially for newcomers. Overall, they praised the visuals and gameplay. The Guardian found it challenging but fun. Though they said it can be repetitive, they said its novel twists of the shoot 'em up formula would be fun for open-minded fans of the genre. Sports Illustrated said it is difficult for people who are not fans of the genre, but new players who invest enough time in it may find it addictive.
