= Eleanor Acland =

British Liberal Party politician

Eleanor Margaret Acland
- Born: Eleanor Margaret Cropper; February 28, 1878; Kendal, Westmorland, England
- Died: December 12, 1933 (aged 55); Exeter, Devon, England
- Other names: Eleanor Acland, Margaret Burneside
- Occupations: politician, novelist
- Known for: suffragist
- Spouse: Francis Dyke Acland (1905–1933)
- Children: Richard Acland, Geoffrey Acland, Cuthbert Henry Dyke Acland, Eleanor Edith Dyke Acland

Eleanor Margaret Acland, née Cropper (28 February 1878 – 12 December 1933) was a British Liberal Party politician, suffragist, and novelist. Until 1895 she was known as Eleanor Cropper, from 1895 to 1926 she was known as Eleanor Acland, and from 1926 to her death in 1933 she was known as Lady Acland. She served as president of the Women's Liberal Federation.

== Background ==
Francis Acland

Eleanor Margaret Cropper was born the daughter of Charles James Cropper (son of James Cropper) and Hon. Edith Emily Holland (daughter of Henry Holland, 1st Viscount Knutsford) in the Lake District. She was educated at St Leonards School. She then entered Somerville College, Oxford in 1898, graduating with a first-class degree in history in 1900. After graduating, she worked at the University Women’s Settlement in Birmingham. On 31 August 1905 she married Francis Dyke Acland, the son of a prominent Liberal Party baronet. They had three sons and one daughter. Francis Acland was to sit as a Liberal MP. Her eldest son Richard Acland also sat as a Liberal MP, and her son Geoffrey Acland also stood as a Liberal candidate. The other children were Cuthbert Henry Dyke Acland, who was High Sheriff of Westmorland, and Eleanor Edith Dyke Acland, who died in 1923 aged 10 in a road accident at the gates to their country house of Killerton in Devon.

During the First World War, Acland worked with Belgian refugees becoming a patron of the Chelsea Committee for Belgian Refugees and Committee Secretary of the Belgian Repatriation Fund for which she was awarded the Queen Elisabeth Medal. In 1926, when her husband succeeded to the family baronetcy, she became Lady Acland.

== Professional career ==
Eleanor Acland was an author of novels. She wrote In the Straits of Hope (1904) under the pseudonym of Margaret Burneside, a novel about artists in Chelsea, and Dark Side Out (1921), a multi-generational family saga. She also wrote two memoirs, Ellen Acland: The Story of a Joyful Life (1925), about her daughter, and Goodbye for the Present, published posthumously in 1935.

== Political career ==
Eleanor Acland was a passionate advocate of Votes for Women and was an active suffragist. She campaigned throughout England for women's suffrage, wrote about it in national newspapers and corresponded with politicians and activists on the subject including Christabel Pankhurst and Emmeline Pethick Lawrence. In 1912 she organised local Women's Liberal Associations to pass resolutions in support of the 1912 Conciliation Bill. In 1913 she founded the Liberal Women's Suffrage Union which campaigned to make sure that anti-suffrage parliamentary candidates were not selected for the Liberal Party.

In 1929 Lady Acland was elected President of the Women's Liberal Federation. She served a two-year term of office. In 1931 when Sir Herbert Samuel led the Liberal Party into the National Government, she supported him. She was one of the eight signatories to the 1931 Liberal Party Election Manifesto. She was Liberal candidate for the Exeter division of Devon at the 1931 General Election. No Liberal candidate had run at the previous general election in 1929, when the Conservative vote split between two candidates. In 1931 her intervention pushed the Labour candidate down to third place. However, in a UK-wide election in which the Conservatives polled well, she finished behind the Conservative candidate, who also supported the National Government. She did not stand for parliament again.

=== Electoral record ===
General Election 1931: Exeter
Party	Candidate	Votes	%	±%
Conservative	Arthur Conrad Reed	20,360	55.2	n/a
Liberal	Lady Eleanor Mary Acland	8,571	23.2	n/a
Labour	James Viner Delahaye	7,958	21.6	−6.2
Majority		11,789	32.0	n/a
Turnout			84.8	+2.9
Conservative hold		Swing	n/a	

Party political offices
Preceded by Margery Corbett Ashby	President of the Women's Liberal Federation; 1929–1931	Succeeded by Catherine Alderton
