= The Magic of Music =

Canadian children's classical music television program

- Genre: children's music
- Written by: Helmut Blume
- Presented by: Eugene Kash
- Country of origin: Canada
- Original language: English
- No. of seasons: 3

Production
- Running time: 30 minutes

Original release
- Network: CBC Television
- Release: 22 November 1955 – 24 June 1958

The Magic of Music is a Canadian children's classical music television program that aired on CBC Television from 1955 to 1958.

== Premise ==
This series taught classical music theory and history for children.

== Scheduling ==
This half-hour series was broadcast on Tuesday afternoons for three seasons: 22 November 1955 to 10 April 1956 (4:30 p.m., alternate weeks), 22 January to 16 April 1957 (5:00 p.m. weekly) and 1 April to 24 June 1958 (5:00 p.m. weekly).
