= List of mayors of Colchester =

The mayor of Colchester sits as non-political chairman of Colchester City Council and serves as the civic representative of the borough. The mayoralty is customarily awarded to the most senior councillor of one of the political groups

== Current mayor ==
The incumbent mayor of Colchester - from 27 May 2026 - is Cllr Andrew Ellis (Conservative)

== The role of mayor ==
The mayor is the chief citizen and represents the city throughout their year of office. The Mace, carried by the Town Serjeant on ceremonial occasions and into the council chamber, is the symbol of that authority.

The mayor sits as non-political chairman of the council. The mayoralty is customarily awarded to the most senior councillor of one of the political groups, who take it in turn. The nomination is only rarely challenged. The mayor serves for a year as deputy mayor, usually in the municipal year prior.

The annual ceremony of the installation of a new mayor takes place each May, following the city council elections. The mayor's election takes place at the first meeting of the newly formed council.

The council, officers and members of the public gather in the Moot Hall to welcome the incoming mayor who takes the oath administered by the Town Clerk.

== The mayor's parlour ==
The mayor's parlour is the Colchester Town Hall office where the mayor works, as well as the reception suite for visitors. The borough regalia (including The Mace), is also displayed there, and represents gifts to the town as well as items of the borough's heritage.

== The mayor's charities ==
Throughout their year in office, the mayor organises events to raise money for their charities ("The Mayor's Charities").

== List of Colchester mayors ==
=== Since 1836 ===
Mayors subsequent to the passing of the Municipal Corporation Act 1835.

==== 2000–present ====
- 2026/27 Andrew Ellis (Conservative)
- 2025/26 Mike Lilley (Labour and Co-op)
- 2024/25 Lesley Scott-Boutell (Liberal Democrat-turned-independent (Note: Lesley Scott-Boutell resigned from the Liberal Democrats a week after being elected mayor.))
- 2023/24 John Jowers (Conservative)
- 2022/23 Tim Young (Labour)
- 2020/22 Robert Davidson (Conservative) (from October 2020)
- 2019/20 Nick Cope (Liberal Democrat) (until October 2020)
- 2018/19 Peter Chillingworth (Conservative)
- 2017/18 Gerard Oxford (Highwoods Independent)
- 2016/17 Julie Young (Labour)
- 2015/16 Theresa Higgins (Liberal Democrats)
- 2014/15 John Elliott (Conservative)
- 2013/14 Colin Sykes (Liberal Democrat)
- 2012/13 Christopher Arnold (Conservative)
- 2011/12 Helen Chuah (Liberal Democrat)
- 2010/11 Sonia Lewis (Conservative)
- 2009/10 Henry Spyvee (Liberal Democrat)
- 2008/09 Margaret Fairley-Crowe (Conservative)
- 2008 Peter Crowe (Conservative) (died in office)
- 2007/08 Ray Gamble (Liberal Democrat)
- 2006/07 Richard H Gower (Conservative)
- 2005/06 Terry Sutton (Liberal Democrat)
- 2004/05 John Bouckley (Conservative)
- 2003/04 Chris Hall (Liberal Democrat)
- 2002/03 Nigel Chapman (Conservative)
- 2001/02 Mike Hogg (Liberal Democrat)
- 2000/01 Christopher Garnett (Conservative)

==== 1990–1999 ====
- 1999/2000 Martin Hunt (Liberal Democrat)
- 1998/99 David Cannon (Conservative)
- 1997/98 Jenny Stevens (Liberal Democrat)
- 1996/97 Wesley Sandford (Liberal Democrat)
- 1995/96 Mary Fairhead (Conservative)
- 1994/95 J Tony Webb (Tiptree Independent)
- 1993/94 Ivan Trusler (Liberal Democrat)
- 1992/93 Mary Frank (Labour)
- 1991/92 R Paul Spendlove (Conservative)
- 1990/91 Ken Cooke (Labour)

==== 1980–1989 ====
- 1989/90 John Sanderson (Conservative)
- 1988/89 Graham Bober (Labour)
- 1987/88 John Lampon (Conservative)
- 1986/87 Bob Russell (SDP), MP for Colchester, 1997-2015
- 1985/86 J Williams (Conservative)
- 1984/85 Janet Fulford (Conservative)
- 1983/84 John Bird (Labour)
- 1982/83 Eric L W James (Conservative)
- 1981/82 Roger Browning (Conservative)
- 1980/81 Frank Wilkin (Labour)

==== 1970–1979 ====
- 1979/80 Cyril Sargeant (Conservative)
- 1978/79 David Holt (Conservative)
- 1977/78 L Woodrow (Labour)
- 1976/77 Joyce Brooks (Conservative)
- 1975/76 W Ladbrook (Labour)
- 1974/75 James Jackson
- 1973/74 Arthur Parsonson (Conservative)
- 1972/73 Walter Buckingham (Labour)
- 1971/72 A Smith
- 1970/71 J Richard Wheeler (Conservative)

==== 1960–1969 ====
- 1969/70 R Hilham (Conservative)
- 1968/69 C Howe (Labour)
- 1967/68 Edward Duffield
- 1966/67 C Pell
- 1965/66 S Wooster
- 1964/65 W Willingham
- 1963/64 R Harrison
- 1962/63 W Porter
- 1961/62 D Panton
- 1960/61 I Brown

==== 1950–1959 ====
- 1959/60 A Kay
- 1958/59 May Cook
- 1957/58 C Wheeler (Conservative)
- 1956/57 C Child (Labour)
- 1955/56 Alexander Craig (Conservative)
- 1954/55 T Morris
- 1953/54 Kathleen Sanders (Conservative)
- 1952/53 W Lee (Labour)
- 1951/52 H Reid
- 1950/51 J Andrews

==== 1940–1949 ====
- 1949/50 P Warwick Bailey
- 1948/49 Leonard Dansie
- 1947/48 Leonard Dansie
- 1946/47 L Worsnop
- 1945/46 H Thompson
- 1944/45 Arthur Piper
- 1943/44 Maurice Pye
- 1942/43 Percy Sanders
- 1941/42 Percy Sanders
- 1940/41 Percy Sanders

==== 1930–1939 ====
- 1939/40 Percy Sanders
- 1938/39 H H Fisher
- 1937/38 Alec Blaxill
- 1936/37 G C Benham
- 1935/36 F MacDonald-Docker
- 1934/35 Arthur Cross
- 1933/34 William Gurney Benham
- 1932/33 Maurice Pye
- 1931/32 George Hazell
- 1930/31 William Harper

==== 1920–1929 ====
- 1929/30 C Jolly (Labour)
- 1928/29 John Russell
- 1927/28 Ernest Turner
- 1926/27 Charles Smallwood
- 1925/26 Arthur Piper
- 1924/25 Catherine Reeve Hunt
- 1923/24 Catherine Alderton (Liberal)
- 1922/23 Percy Alan Sanders
- 1921/22 Wasey Chopping
- 1920/21 Arthur Lucking

==== 1910–1919 ====
- 1919/20 Owen Ward
- 1918/19 George Wright
- 1917/18 Arthur Jarmin
- 1916/17 John Bailey
- 1915/16 Allen Aldridge
- 1914/15 W Coats Hutton
- 1913/14 Wilson Marriage
- 1912/13 W Coats Hutton
- 1911/12 Reginald Beard
- 1910/11 Frank Cant

==== 1900–1909 ====
- 1909/10 Alec Blaxill
- 1908/09 William Gurney Benham
- 1907/08 Wilson Marriage
- 1906/07 Walter Sparling
- 1905/06 Henry Goody
- 1904/05 Edwin Sanders
- 1903/04 Ernest Barritt
- 1902/03 Henry H Elwes (Conservative)
- 1901/02 Wilson Marriage (Liberal)
- 1900/01 C Egerton-Green

==== 1890–1899 ====
- 1899/1900 E Thompson Smith
- 1898/99 Edwin J Sanders
- 1897/98 James Noah Paxman, founder of Davey, Paxman and Co
- 1896/97 H G Egerton-Green
- 1895/96 James Wicks
- 1894/95 C E Egerton-Green
- 1893/94 Henry Goody
- 1892/93 William Gurney Benham
- 1891/92 Wilson Marriage
- 1890/91 Lent J Watts

==== 1880–1889 ====
- 1889/90 Asher Prior
- 1888/89 Edwin J Sanders
- 1887/88 James Noah Paxman, founder of Davey, Paxman and Co
- 1886/87 H G Egerton-Green
- 1885/86 Henry Laver
- 1884/85 H J Gurdon-Rebow
- 1884 J Harvey
- 1883/84 Alfred Francis
- 1882/83 J Harvey
- 1881/82 J Harvey
- 1880/81 Samuel Chaplin

==== 1870–1879 ====
- 1879/80 John Kent
- 1878/79 Thomas Moy
- 1877/78 Thomas Moy
- 1876/77 John Bishop
- 1875/76 P Papillon
- 1874/75 John Bishop
- 1873/74 Edward Round
- 1872/73 John Bishop
- 1871/72 Charles Hawkins
- 1870/71 Charles Hawkins

==== 1860–1869 ====
- 1869/70 John Bishop
- 1868/69 Francis Smythies
- 1867/68 John Bishop
- 1866/67 PO Papillon
- 1865/66 Charles Hawkins
- 1864/65 John Bishop
- 1863/64 John Bishop
- 1862/63 Edward Williams
- 1861/62 Henry Wolton
- 1860/61 Francis Smythies

==== 1850–1859 ====
- 1859/60 Edward Williams
- 1858/59 Arthur Laing
- 1857/58 Peter Duncan
- 1856/57 Henry Wolton
- 1855/56 Joseph Cooke
- 1854/55 Edward Williams
- 1853/54 Henry Wolton
- 1852/53 Francis Smythies
- 1851/52 Arthur Laing
- 1850/51 Joseph Cooke

==== 1840–1849 ====
- 1849/50 Edward Williams
- 1848/49 Charles Hawkins
- 1847/48 Henry Wolton
- 1846/47 William Bolton Smith
- 1845/46 Henry Wolton
- 1844/45 Henry Wolton
- 1843/44 Henry Vint
- 1842/43 Roger Nunn
- 1841/42 Henry Vint
- 1840/41 Thomas Turner

==== 1836–1839 ====
- 1839/40 Samuel Green Cooke
- 1838/39 George Bawtree
- 1837/38 Samuel Green Cooke
- 1836/37 John Chaplin
- 1836 George Savill

=== Pre-1835 ===
Mayors prior to the passing of the Municipal Corporation Act 1835.

==== 1830–1835 ====
- 1834 Roger Nunn
- 1833 Win. Smith
- 1832 Edward Clay
- 1831 William Sparling
- 1830 William Smith

==== 1820–1829 ====
- 1829 Edward Clay
- 1828 William Sparling
- 1827 John Clay
- 1826 Edward Clay
- 1825 John Clay
- 1824 Samuel Clay
- 1823 John Clay
- 1822 William Smith
- 1821 James Boggis
- 1820 John Clay

==== 1810–1819 ====
- 1819 Frincis Tillett Abell
- 1818 William Argent
- 1817 Edward Clay
- 1816 William Argent
- 1815 Edward Clay
- 1814 John King
- 1813 William Sparling
- 1813 William Smith
- 1812 John Bridge
- 1811 Francis Smythies
- 1810 Francis Tillett Abell

==== 1800–1809 ====
- 1809 William Smith
- 1808 Thomas Hedge
- 1807 Thomas Hedge
- 1806 William Smith
- 1805 William Sparling
- 1804 Thomas Hedge
- 1803 William Bunnell
- 1802 William Phillips
- 1801 Thomas Hedge
- 1800 William Smith

==== 1790–1799 ====
- 1799 Robert Hewes
- 1798 William Phillips
- 1797 Thomas Hedge
- 1796 William Mason
- 1795 William Bunnell
- 1794 William Phillips
- 1793 Newton Tills
- 1792 Nathaniel Barlow
- 1791 John Gibson
- 1790 William Swinborne

==== 1780–1789 ====
- 1789 Edmund Lilley
- 1788 Bezaliel Angier
- 1787 Edward Capstack
- 1786 William Argent
- 1785 Edmund Lilley
- 1784 Samuel Ennew
- 1783 William Seabor
- 1782 Stephen Betts
- 1781 John King
- 1780 Thomas Boggis

==== 1770–1779 ====
- 1779 Thomas Clamtree
- 1778 John King
- 1777 Thomas Clamtree
- 1776 Thomas Boggis
- 1775 Thomas Clamtree
- 1775 John King
- 1774 John Bakers
- 1773 Thomas Clamtree
- 1772 Thomas Clamtree
- 1772 Thomas Bayles
- 1771 Solomon Smith.
- 1770 John King

==== 1763–1769 ====
- 1769 Jordan Harris Lisle
- 1768 James Robjent
- 1767 Samuel Ennew
- 1766 Thomas Bayles
- 1765 Thomas Wilshire
- 1764 Henry Lodge
- 1763 Thomas Clamtree
- 1740 to 1763: there being no Charter in existence, no Mayor could be appointed.

==== 1730–1740 ====
- 1740 Jeremiah Daniell
- 1740 G. Wegg, junior
- 1739 John Blatch
- 1738 Joseph Duffield
- 1737 James Boys
- 1736 Thomas Carew
- 1735 John Blatch
- 1734 Joseph Duffield
- 1733 James Boys
- 1732 Thomas Carew
- 1731 John Blatch
- 1730 Joseph Duffield

==== 1720–1729 ====
- 1729 James Boys (or Boyce)
- 1728 John Blatch
- 1727 Ralph Creffield, junior
- 1726 Matthew Martin
- 1725 Jeremiah Daniell
- 1724 Peter Johnson
- 1723 Samuel Jarrold
- 1722 Edmund Raynham
- 1721 Arthur Winsley
- 1720 Jeremiah Daniell

==== 1710–1719 ====
- 1719 Thomas Grigson
- 1719 Nathaniel Lawrence, junior
- 1718 Robert Clark
- 1717 Thomas Grigson
- 1716 Sir Isaac Rebow, MP for Colchester 4 times between 1689 and 1722
- 1715 Peter Johnson
- 1714 George Clark
- 1713 James Lawrence
- 1712 Peter Johnson
- 1711 James Lawrence
- 1710 Nathaniel Lawrence, junior

==== 1700–1709 ====
- 1709 Samuel Angier
- 1709 Nathaniel Lawrence senior, MP for Colchester, 1685
- 1708 John Pepper
- 1707 George Clark
- 1706 James Lawrence
- 1705 John Rainham
- 1704 Nathaniel Lawrence, junior
- 1703 Samuel Angier
- 1702 Ralph Creffield, junior
- 1701 Samuel Fetherstone
- 1700 John Potter

==== 1690–1699 ====
- 1699 William Francis
- 1698 William Boys
- 1697 Ralph Creffield, junior
- 1696 Nathaniel Lawrence, junior
- 1696 John Seabrook
- 1695 John Beason
- 1694 William Moore
- 1693 Samuel Mott
- 1692 John Stileman
- 1691 John Seabrook
- 1690 Benjamin Cock

==== 1680–1689 ====
- 1689 John Potter
- 1688 John Milbank
- 1687 John Milbank
- 1687 Alexander Hindmers
- 1686 Samuel Mott
- 1685 William Flannar
- 1684 John Stilleman
- 1683 Nathaniel Lawrence, senior
- 1682 Thomas Greene
- 1681 William Moor
- 1680 Ralph Creffield

==== 1670–1679 ====
- 1679 Nathaniel Lawrence, senior
- 1678 John Rayner
- 1677 Ralph Creffield
- 1676 Thomas Greene
- 1675 Alexander Hinmers
- 1674 Henry Lambe
- 1673 Ralph Creffield
- 1672 Nathaniel Lawrence, senior
- 1671 John Rayner
- 1670 William Moor

==== 1660–1669 ====
- 1669 Henry Lambe
- 1668 Ralph Creffield
- 1667 Andrew Fromanteele
- 1666 William Flannar
- 1665 Thomas Talbot
- 1664 Thomas Wade
- 1663 William Moor
- 1662 Thomas Rennolds
- 1662 Henry Lambe
- 1661 John Milbank
- 1660 John Gale

==== 1650–1659 ====
- 1659 Thomas Peeke
- 1659 Jonn Radhams
- 1658 Henry Barrington
- 1657 Nicholas Beason
- 1656 John Vickers
- 1655 Thomas Lawrence
- 1654 Thomas Reynolds
- 1653 Thomas Peeke
- 1652 John Radhams
- 1651 Richard Greene
- 1650 John Furlie

==== 1640–1649 ====
- 1649 Thomas Wade
- 1648 Henry Barrington
- 1647 William Cooke
- 1646 John Langley
- 1645 Robert Buxton
- 1644 John Cox
- 1643 Thomas Lawrence
- 1642 Ralph Harrison
- 1641 Thomas Wade
- 1641 Henry Barrington
- 1640 Robert Talcott

==== 1635–1639 ====
- 1639 John Langley
- 1638 John Firlie (or Furley.)
- 1637 Henry Barrington
- 1636 Robert Buxton
- 1635 Daniel Cole
