= Women's Liberal Federation =

Organisation of the UK Liberal Party

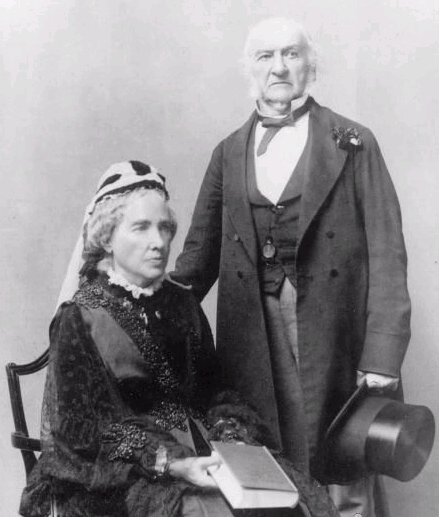
Catherine and William Gladstone

The Women's Liberal Federation was an organisation that was part of the Liberal Party in the United Kingdom.

== History ==
The Women's Liberal Federation (WLF) was formed on the initiative of Sophia Fry, who in 1886 called a meeting at her house of fifteen local Women's Liberal Associations. The establishment of a national organisation was agreed, and this occurred in 1887, when members of forty associations met in London. It was reported that the federation membership was about 6,000, but this grew rapidly, reaching 75,000 in 1892. By 1904 there were 494 affiliated associations and a membership of approximately 67,600. By 1907 there were 613 affiliated associations, and a membership of 83,000.

The federation's first president in 1887 was Catherine Gladstone. At the start of the twentieth century, the WLF had approximately 500 local branches and approximately 60,000 active members.

In 1892, the WLF split over whether to support women's suffrage. While Sophia Fry was personally in favour, she felt it was a divisive issue and should not become the policy of the group. As a result, when the policy was voted in, she left to become a founder of the rival Women's National Liberal Association, serving as its vice-president.

Active members of the Women's Liberal Federation were often related to Liberal Members of Parliament or Liberal MPs. This gave these women an advantage since they knew how to work their way around politics.

One such active member, related to a Liberal MP, was Violet Bonham Carter, a British politician, diarist and daughter of H. H. Asquith, the Prime Minister of the United Kingdom from 1908 to 1916.

Another active member was Megan Lloyd George, the daughter of David Lloyd George, Prime Minister of the United Kingdom from 1916 to 1922 and the last Liberal to hold the office. Megan Lloyd George, voted one of the 50 greatest Welsh women and men of all time, was a Welsh politician who became the first female Parliament Member or MP (Member of Parliament) for a Welsh Constituency, winning Anglesey for the Liberals in 1929. She subsequently became a Labour Member of Parliament, standing against the Liberals in 1957 and winning the seat in Carmarthen.

Margery Corbett-Ashby, daughter of the Liberal Party politician, Charles Corbett, was also involved with the WLF. In February 1977 she spoke to the historian, Brian Harrison, about her experiences as a member of the federation, and its role in the Liberal Party as part of the Suffrage Interviews project, titled Oral evidence on the suffragette and suffragist movements: the Brian Harrison interviews.

WLF members were often involved in other organisations or societies. Lady Carlisle supported a campaign that fought for the rights for women to vote. Members of the Women's Liberal Federation were a part of the National Union of Women's Suffrage Societies. However many members became dissatisfied with the Women's Suffrage Society because they apparently opposed the rights for women to vote. Lady Carlisle was the one who first brought up the topic of dissatisfaction.

== General politics ==
The Women's Liberal Federation was a subset of the Liberal political party in the United Kingdom, members had predominately progressive political views. The party collectively shared the same contemporary attitudes towards women in their society that the other women's suffrage movements and the Liberal party itself upheld.

They sought out to combat the prejudiced and outdated Victorian views still present at the time. It was still commonly believed that men and women took on different societal and personal roles, with men being active and productive members of society, while women were expected to become mothers and homemakers. While men were to be working in business or in political spheres, women were to be subservient to their husbands. It was believed that women were too emotional, irrational, and indecisive to uphold positions in government roles, and instead should focus on the family rather than a career. It was also often believed that women were inherently opposed to politics, so a woman's political views were to be represented by the man of the household's vote. The society of the time also strongly believed that the group of women campaigning for women's suffrage was an incredibly small minority. In turn, the Women's Liberal Federation actively worked to overcome these ideas and values upheld in the society.

These values also posed another issue for the women's suffrage movement and the Liberal government in the United Kingdom. From 1832 to 1884, the voting system in the United Kingdom was not very inclusive for women or for men. Before 1832, only around 8% of men had the right to vote, and after 1884, only around 60% of men had the right to vote. After 1884 and before 1918, the right to vote was based on a number of factors, ranging from someone's property value to their overall wealth. Not only did the suffragette movement seek to gain the right to vote themselves, but the Women's Liberal Federation also eventually began to attempt to rectify this voting system for all people, on the basis of men and women alike.

The Liberal government also worked alongside other women's suffrage groups to petition Parliament and create more inclusive bills and laws. These petitions for new laws and bills, however, were not the most well-received, as the governments of the time did not usually vote in favour of women's rights.

The Women's Liberal Federation also strongly believed in improving women's democratic rights in society. Throughout a 40 year period, numerous changes were made in the law that enacted more democratic rights for women. The United Kingdom suffrage movement, including the WLF, worked to make strides in ensuring these rights. Prior to the formation of the Women's Liberal Federation, the suffrage movement in the United Kingdom helped to form the Municipal Corporation (Elections) Act 1869, the Elementary Education Act 1870, the Public Health Act 1875, and the Married Women's Property Act 1882. After the creation of the WLF, the political party also helped to create the Local Government Act 1888 and the Qualification of Women (County and Borough Councils) Act 1907.

Other than working towards equality in the voting system and in the government, the Liberal government and the women's suffrage movement groups, including the Women's Liberal Federation, also focused on attempting to rectify some of the social issues present at the time. As a whole, the government and these groups were in favour of raising taxes for the general public as a way to fund workers' sickness and unemployment benefits. However, when they faced backlash and opposition to this potential bill, these suffragette campaigns aimed to work even harder and even stronger in order to gain success.

After 1916, the Liberal government began to work on political reformation after the war. Because of the war, many elements within the society had changed. Not only were men affected by these societal changes, but it quickly became apparent that women provided a large contribution to war efforts, including raising the women's employment rate over 10%, primarily in work forces otherwise dominated by men. The suffragette movement groups used this knowledge to remind the society that the war could not have been carried out without the help of these women. This information influenced the production of the Representation of the People Act 1918, which would grant nearly all men and women the right to vote under certain circumstances. Though this act was denied at first, 10 years later, in 1928, women finally gained the right to vote on the same basis as men.

Regardless, the WLF did succeed in one very important thing. The WLF were persistent in actually obtaining a bill to pass that gave women the right to vote. This bill was passed in June in the year 1914. Not only that, but the WLF also obtained the Cambridge Resolution to pass, which stated clearly that they as a whole would withdraw support from candidates who in any way did not support the adoption of the women's suffrage. Throughout their journey, the WLF had many roller coasters with increased and decreased in members leaving and joining the organization.

Until 1892, the group was divided between supporters of women's suffrage and those who stated that they were neutral on the matter. That year, William Gladstone wrote a letter opposing votes for women, and the group held a three day debate to establish a firm position. At the close of the debate, delegates votes to support suffrage; this led between 50 and 60 branches which did not support the policy to leave, consisting of 7,000 to 10,000 members. They formed the rival Women's National Liberal Association.

The Women's Liberal Federation took initiative in addressing many of the liberally leaning issues that the main branch of the Liberal Party neglected. The Women's Liberal Federation focused mainly on issues that more heavily impacted women and other non-voting populations. The goal of the Women's Liberal Federation was to put pressure on the main branch of the Liberal Party to support women's issues and give their support only to members of the party that were willing to support their agendas. The federation addressed many issues of the time, supporting the Women's Suffrage Movement, petitioning in favour of the Midwives Bill, backing the Infant Life Protection Bill, helping to establish the Anti-Vivisection Movement, and starting Anti-War initiatives against engagement in the Second Boer War.

During this era, the use of midwives in the birthing process was common, and a more accessible option for poor and rural individuals. However, the practice of being a midwife was not regulated by the British government. The Midwives Bill, published in 1891, proposed that anyone operating as a midwife needed to be recognised by the state and be licensed in the practice of midwifery, citing that "In other countries midwives were, as a rule, under state control, but here any woman might, call herself and practice as a midwife." The bill proposed that, in the interest of public safety, midwives and monthly nurses should be registered, formally assessed, and licensed by the state. The bill states that the midwives were often employed by lower-class families and that their role in poorer communities meant that, because they serviced higher-risk populations in the place of a medical man, there needed to be greater oversight in who was practicing midwifery. Likewise, the bill cited that, because midwives had more than one patient (mother and child), that they had a greater responsibility to their patients, and as such, needed more regulation for the benefit of the community at large.

Their many publications included The Protection of Child Life, published in October 1890. The publication, distributed by the Executive Committee of the Women's Liberal Federation, and prepared by Mrs. Broadly Reid, argues in favour of the enactment of The Infant Life Protection Bill and the Children's Life Insurance Bill. These bills were favoured by the Women's Liberal Federation because it was believed that they would assist in combating child cruelty, neglect, and infanticide. The publication states that “a large number of cases of cruelty to children have been brought before judges, magistrates, and coroners in all parts of the country”. The goal of the act was to prevent the neglect, abuse, and exploitation of children by advocating for the registration and inspection of baby farms as well as limit the acquisition of illegitimate children in hopes of preventing insurance fraud which was often perpetuated in these circumstances.

The Women's Liberal Federation played a part in the Anti-Vivisection Movement. Many members of the Women's Liberal Federation argued for Anti-Vivisection legislation, petitioning against cruelty towards animals and the use of animals in the fields of medicine and science. The National Anti-Vivisection Society was founded in 1875 and fought to limit the use of animals in scientific settings. "They believed with unfaltering faith that to torture animals was unjustifiable and immoral, and that the profession of the most lofty motives did not justify the committal of acts which were in themselves immoral."

From early on, the Women's Liberal Federation opposed the nation's engagement in the Second Boer War. From 1899 to 1902, groups such as the Women's Liberal Federation maintained pacifist ideals, opposing the war in the Transvaal Republic, citing "what it perceived to be a dangerous spirit of militarism and jingoism abroad in the land." The spirit of colonial ideals was burning bright in Britain, and members of the Women's Liberal Federation feared what war would do to the nation regardless of whether they won or lost. Likewise, the lack of voting rights that women had fanned the flame for taxpaying women who had no political say in matters of war. It was during this time that the Women's Liberal Federation solidified its stance on the suffrage movement and the enfranchisement of women.

As of 1905, the WLF's objectives included promoting just legislation for women, through the introduction of votes for women at local and parliamentary elections, on the same basis as men.

In 1908, the WLF invited David Lloyd George to speak at the Royal Albert Hall. The Women's Social and Political Union suspected that Lloyd George was going to make no promises and threatened to disrupt the meeting if he made no substantive commitment to giving votes to women. He did not and they did. Helen Ogston was notably assaulted as she was evicted. She tried to defend herself with a dog whip and caused a storm in the newspapers. Lloyd George refused to allow women in to his future public events.

In 1988, when the Liberal Party merged with the SDP to form the Liberal Democrats, the Women's Liberal Federation was wound up.

== Presidents of the Women's Liberal Federation ==
The WLF President was elected annually, and served for a one-year term.

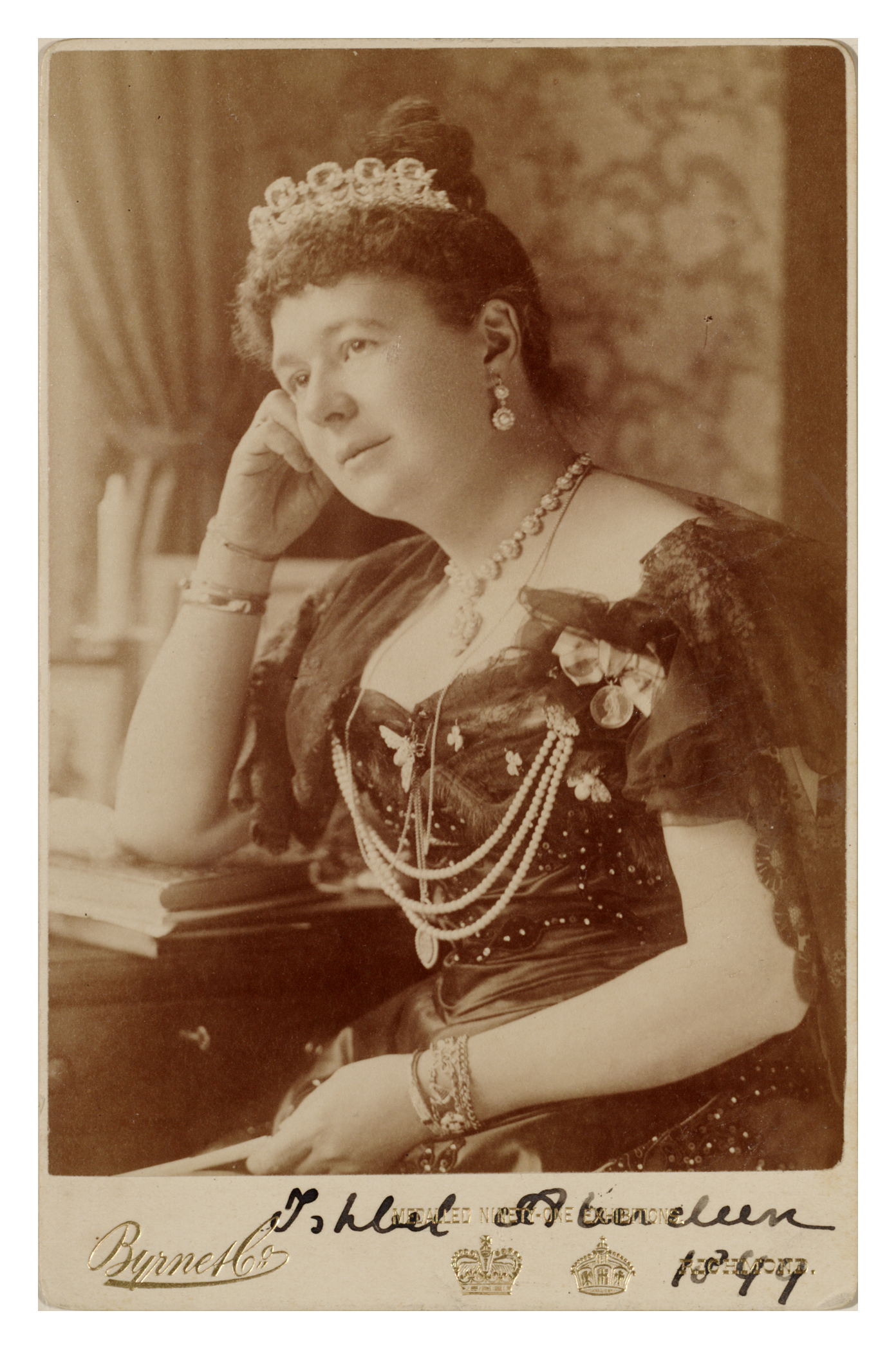
Isabel Aberdeen

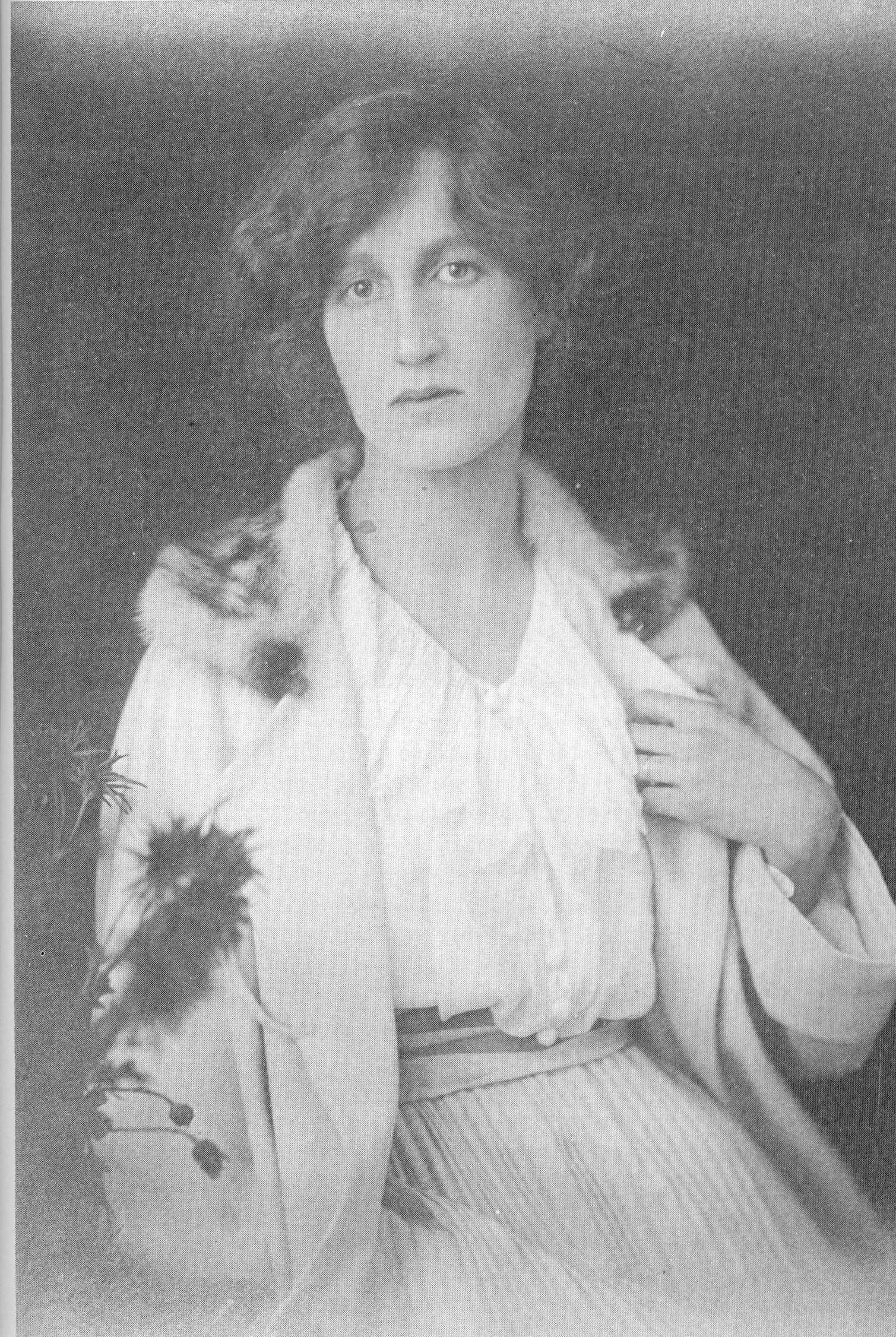
Violet Bonham-Carter

Margaret Wintringham

Margery Corbett Ashby

Alison Garland

From	To	Name
1887	1893	Catherine Gladstone
1893	1894	Ishbel Hamilton-Gordon
1894	1902	Rosalind Howard
1902	1906	Ishbel Hamilton-Gordon
1906	1915	Rosalind Howard
1915	1919	Laura McLaren
1919	1921	Hilda Runciman
1921	1923	The Viscountess Cowdray
1923	1925	Violet Bonham Carter
1925	1927	Margaret Wintringham
1927	1929	Margery Corbett Ashby
1929	1931	Lady Acland
1931	1932	Catherine Alderton
1932	1934	Margaret Wintringham
1934	1936	Alison Garland
1936	1938	Megan Lloyd George
1938	1939	Viscountess Dorothy Gladstone
1939	1945	Violet Bonham Carter
1945	1947	Megan Lloyd George
1947	1949	Eleanor Layton, Lady Layton
1949	1950	Ethel Strudwick
1950	1952	Doreen Gorsky
1952	1955	Malys Thompson
1955	19??	Sybil Mary Whitamore
1958	19??	Lady Ruth Abrahams
by 1961	1962	Heather Harvey
1962	1964 or later	Winifred Grubb
as of 1965	?	Audrey Malindine
by 1966	1968	Gaenor Heathcoat Amory
1968	1970	Stina Robson
1970	1972	Penelope Jessel
1972	1974	Joyce Rose
1974	1977	Baroness Seear
1977	1978	Nelia Penman
1978	19??	Meg Budd
197?	198?	Barbara Banks
198?	1983	Elizabeth Sidney
1983	1985	Laura Grimond
1986	1988	Christina Baron
