= Margery Corbett Ashby =

British activist (1882–1981)

Dame Margery Corbett Ashby DBE
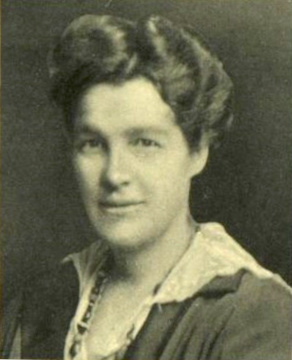
- Ashby in 1923

President of the Women's Liberal Federation
- In office 1928–1929
- Preceded by: Margaret Wintringham
- Succeeded by: Eleanor Acland

Personal details
- Born: Margery Irene Corbett; 19 April 1882 Danehill, East Sussex, England
- Died: 15 May 1981 (aged 99)
- Spouse: Brian Ashby (m. 1910)
- Children: Michael Ashby
- Occupation: Politician, activist

Dame Margery Irene Corbett Ashby, DBE (née Corbett; 19 April 1882 – 15 May 1981) was a British suffragist, Liberal politician, feminist and internationalist.

== Background ==
Margery Corbett was born at Danehill, East Sussex, the daughter of Charles Corbett, a barrister who was briefly Liberal MP for East Grinstead and Marie (Gray) Corbett, herself a Liberal feminist and local councillor in Uckfield. Margery was educated at home. Her governess was the feminist polymath Lina Eckenstein. Eckenstein was to become her friend and assisted with her work.

She passed the Classical tripos as a student at Newnham College, Cambridge; but the university did not at that time give degrees to female students. She married lawyer Brian Ashby in 1910. Their only child, a son, Michael Ashby (1914–2004), was a neurologist who gave evidence as an expert witness at the 1957 trial of suspected serial killer John Bodkin Adams.

== Political career ==
With her sister Cicely and friends, she founded the Younger Suffragists in 1901. After deciding against teaching, she was appointed Secretary of the National Union of Women's Suffrage Societies in 1907. She served as President of the International Woman Suffrage Alliance, later renamed to the International Alliance of Women for Suffrage and Equal Citizenship (IAW), from 1923 to 1946. During the preparation for a 1935 IAW conference in Istanbul, she lamented the fact women did not have the right to vote in Turkey. Reportedly, the President of Turkey at the time, Kemal Atatürk, heard about this, and shortly thereafter women gained the right to vote in Turkey.

She received an honorary LLD from Mount Holyoke College (USA) in 1937 in recognition of her international work. In 1942, she went on a government propaganda mission to Sweden.

Ashby was one of the seventeen women candidates to contest a parliamentary election at the first opportunity in the General Election of 1918. She stood for Birmingham Ladywood against Neville Chamberlain, the Unionist Coalition candidate. Her slogan was A soldier's wife for Ladywood. Although she came third behind Chamberlain and the Labour candidate J.W. Kneeshaw, she forced Chamberlain to address women's issues during his campaign, one of the few candidates who tried.

Her papers at the Women's Library at the LSE in London contain a selection of her affectionate letters to her husband who was still in France for the early stages of the campaign. Chamberlain kept his sisters up to date with the campaign and his letters are preserved in the Cadbury Research Library at the University of Birmingham. Together they provide a unique record of the candidates' contrasting views of the election campaign.

She contested Richmond, Surrey in 1922 and 1923, Watford in 1924, Hendon in 1929, Hemel Hempstead in 1935 and 1937. Finally, she stood as an independent Liberal with the backing of Radical Action at the 1944 Bury St Edmunds by-election.

== Archives ==
The archives of Margery Corbett Ashby are held at The Women's Library at the London School of Economics. Brian Harrison recorded 6 oral history interviews with Ashby, twice in May 1974, and again in April 1975, September 1976, November 1976 and February 1977, as part of the Suffrage Interviews project, titled Oral evidence on the suffragette and suffragist movements: the Brian Harrison interviews. The 1974 interviews recall her parents, the suffrage movement and her work with the NUWSS. In the 1975 interview Corbett-Ashby continues to talk about the NUWSS, as well as the formation of the Townswomen's Guild and her membership of the International Woman Suffrage Alliance. The interview in September 1976 provides details of her role in international women's organisations, before focusing, in November 1976, on the relationships between a number of different women's organisations, both internationally and in the UK. Finally in February 1977 Corbett-Ashby talks about her experiences with Liberalism and political campaigns. The collection also contains an interview with Ashby's son, Michael Ashby and daughter-in-law, Pamela Ashby, about her life.

== Posthumous recognition ==
Her name and picture (and those of 58 other women's suffrage supporters) are on the plinth of the statue of Millicent Fawcett in Parliament Square, London, unveiled in 2018.

== Electoral record ==
General Election 1918: Birmingham Ladywood
Party	Candidate	Votes	%	±%
Unionist	Neville Chamberlain	9,405	69.5	
Labour	John W. Kneeshaw	2,572	19.0	
Liberal	Margery Corbett Ashby	1,552	11.5	
Majority		6,833	50.5	
Turnout			40.6	
Unionist hold		Swing		

General Election 1922: Richmond (Surrey)
Party	Candidate	Votes	%	±%
Ind. Unionist	Harry Becker	12,075	50.6	
Unionist	Clifford Blackburn Edgar	6,032	25.3	
Liberal	Margery Corbett Ashby	5,765	24.1	
Majority		6,043	25.3	
Turnout			68.8	
Unionist hold		Swing		

General Election 1923: Richmond (Surrey)
Party	Candidate	Votes	%	±%
Unionist	Harry Becker	13,112	63.0	+12.4
Liberal	Margery Corbett Ashby	7,702	37.0	+12.9
Majority			26.0	+.07
Turnout			59.4	−9.4
Unionist hold		Swing		

General Election 1924: Watford
Party	Candidate	Votes	%	±%
Unionist	Dennis Herbert	15,271	54.7	
Labour	Herbert Henry Elvin	7,417	26.6	
Liberal	Margery Corbett Ashby	5,205	18.7	
Majority		7,854	28.1	
Turnout			73.1	
Unionist hold		Swing		

General Election 1929: Hendon
Party	Candidate	Votes	%	±%
Unionist	Philip Cunliffe-Lister	31,758	52.3	
Labour	Robert Lyons	15,434	25.5	
Liberal	Margery Corbett Ashby	13,449	22.2	
Majority		16,324	26.8	
Turnout			72.0	
Unionist hold		Swing		

General Election 1935: Hemel Hempstead
Party	Candidate	Votes	%	±%
Conservative	John Davidson	20,074	62.5	−4.7
Liberal	Margery Corbett Ashby	7,078	22.0	−2.6
Labour	Charles William James	4,951	15.4	+7.2
Majority		12,996	40.6	−2.0
Turnout			69.3	−7.9
Conservative hold		Swing	-1.1	

1937 Hemel Hempstead by-election
Party	Candidate	Votes	%	±%
Conservative	Frances Davidson	14,992	57.7	−4.8
Liberal	Margery Corbett Ashby	7,347	28.3	+6.3
Labour	Charles William James	3,651	14.0	−1.4
Majority		7,645	29.4	−11.2
Turnout			55.0	−14.3
Conservative hold		Swing	-5.6	

1944 Bury St Edmunds by-election
Party	Candidate	Votes	%	±%
Conservative	Edgar Keatinge	11,705	56.2	n/a
Independent Liberal	Margery Corbett Ashby	9,121	43.8	n/a
Majority		2,584	12.4	n/a
Turnout		20,828	50.8	n/a
Conservative hold		Swing	n/a	

Party political offices
Preceded by Margaret Wintringham	President of the Women's Liberal Federation; 1928–1929	Succeeded by Eleanor Acland
