= Charles Corbett =

British politician (1853–1935)

MP East Grinstead DIVISION of Sussex
- In office 1906–1910

Personal details
- Born: Charles Joseph Henry Corbett; 1853
- Died: 20 November 1935 (aged 81–82)
- Party: Liberal
- Education: New College, Oxford

Charles Joseph Henry Corbett, BCL (1853 – 20 November 1935) was a British Liberal Party politician in the radical tradition who was part of a prominent family who supported women's rights.

== Family ==
Corbett was a son of Charles Joseph Corbett a property developer of Thames Ditton. He married in 1881, Marie Gray, daughter of George Gray of Tunbridge Wells. She was an English suffragist, local government worker and supporter of the Liberal Party. They had one son and two daughters, Cicely and Margery, an international feminist campaigner and Liberal Parliamentary candidate.

== Legal career ==
He was educated at Marlborough College and New College, Oxford, and was subsequently called to the bar at the Middle Temple.

== Political career ==
=== Parliament ===
Corbett was a Liberal candidate in East Grinstead in the elections of 1895 and 1900, but was unsuccessful. He sat as Liberal MP for East Grinstead Division of Sussex from 1906–January 1910, having been elected in the Liberal landslide win of 1906, when he became the first and only Liberal to win the division. He was defeated at the January 1910 General Election.

Parliament of the United Kingdom
Preceded by George Goschen	Member of Parliament for East Grinstead; 1906–January 1910	Succeeded by Henry Cautley
Political offices
