= Danehill, East Sussex =

Village in East Sussex, England

Coordinates: 51.03°N 0.00°E

Danehill
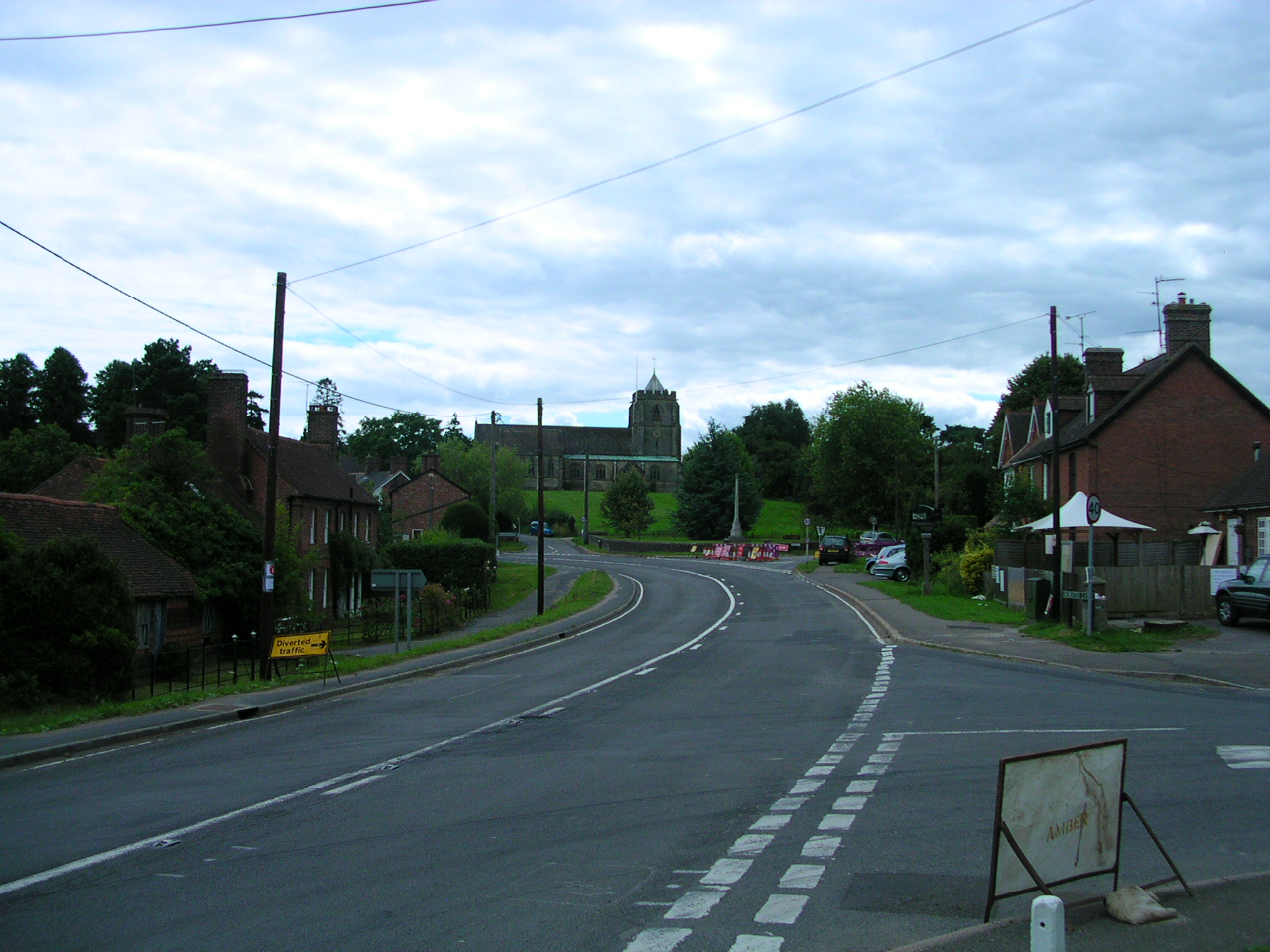
- Danehill village

- Location within East Sussex
- Area: 22.7 km^{2} (8.8 sq mi)
- Population: 1,957 (Parish-2011)
  - Density: 220/sq mi (85/km^{2})
- OS grid reference: TQ402275
  - London: 33 miles (53 km) N
- District: Wealden
- Shire county: East Sussex
- Region: South East
- Country: England
- Sovereign state: United Kingdom
- Post town: HAYWARDS HEATH
- Postcode district: RH17
- Dialling code: 01825
- Police: Sussex
- Fire: East Sussex
- Ambulance: South East Coast
- UK Parliament: East Grinstead and Uckfield

Danehill is a village in East Sussex, England.

== Religious sites ==
There are two Anglican churches in the parish: one at Danehill (dedicated to All Saints) and the other at Chelwood Gate.

== Education ==
There are two schools in the area: the state-run Danehill Church of England primary school and the independent Cumnor House prep school.

== Culture and community ==
The public houses are Coach and Horses (Danehill) and the Red Lion at Chelwood Gate. Musician Maurice Gibb lived in the village for some time.

The Ashdown Weekend is a village event, begun in 1973 and serving to make money for different organisations in the village.

A local author by the name of Sam Alexander, who grew up in Danehill, has written a fictional novel about the village. It is called 'The village that refused to die' and is available to buy on Amazon.

== History ==
The first written evidence of the village comes from 1265 and the first permanent houses from 1400. By 1660, the Red Round Inn became a stopping point for travellers between London and Lewes. After travellers continued to use Danehill's roads, the village decided to improve the roads which led to wealthy families moving into the area, such as John Baker Holroyd who moved into Sheffield Park in 1769 and was later to become the First Lord Sheffield.

== Governance ==
The lowest tier of government for Danehill is the Parish Council. The council has nine seats, for which eleven candidates stood in May 2007 with an elector turnout of 39.92%. A November 2007 single seat by-election was uncontested.

Wealden District Council is the next tier of government, for which Danehill is part of the Danehill/Fletching/Nutley ward, which had a population of 5,346 at the 2011 census. The ward returns two councillors. The ward was uncontested in the May 2007 election and two Conservative councillors were returned.

Danehill is represented at the East Sussex County Council as part of the Buxted Maresfield Ward. The May 2005 election returned the Conservative Councillor Anthony Reid.

The parliamentary constituency for Danehill is East Grinstead and Uckfield.

Before Brexit in 2020, the village was part of the South East England constituency in the European Parliament.

== Notable people ==
- Peter Butterworth, actor, buried in the village
- Janet Brown, actress, comedian, mimic and wife of Peter Butterworth
- Maurice Gibb, musician, lived in the village
- Robert Cecil, 1st Viscount Cecil of Chelwood, diplomat and Nobel Peace Prize winner, buried in the village
- Margery Corbett Ashby politician and activist
