= 1997 Australia Day Honours =

The 1997 Australia Day Honours are appointments to various orders and honours to recognise and reward good works by Australian citizens. The list was announced on 26 January 1997 by the Governor General of Australia, Sir William Deane.

The Australia Day Honours are the first of the two major annual honours lists, the first announced to coincide with Australia Day (26 January), with the other being the Queen's Birthday Honours, which are announced on the second Monday in June.

== Order of Australia ==
=== Companion (AC) ===
==== General Division ====
Recipient	Citation	Notes
Franco Belgiorno-Nettis, CBE AM	For service to the arts, to Australian business through the engineering and construction industry and to the community	
Dr Peter Charles Doherty	For service to scientific research, particularly the role of major histocompatibility complex proteins in cell mediated immunity	
The Honourable Justice William Montague Charles Gummow	For service to the law as a Justice of the High Court of Australia	
Sir (Alan) Charles Mackerras, CBE	For service to music as an operatic conductor and for the promotion of the international status of Australian music	

=== Officer (AO) ===
==== General Division ====
Recipient	Citation	Notes
Professor John Robert Booker	For service to geomechanical engineering, particularly through research, teaching and educational administration	
The Honourable Frederick Michael Chaney	For service to the Parliament of Australia and to the Aboriginal community through the establishment of the Aboriginal Legal Service and mediation with the National Native Title Tribunal	
Professor John Paul Coghlan	For service to scientific and medical research and the Howard Florey Institute of Experimental Physiology and Medicine, particularly in the field of endocrinology and to the arts	
Emeritus Professor John Louis Dillon	For service to education, particularly in the field of Agricultural economics and international development economics	
The Reverend Thomas Michael Doyle	For service to the Catholic Church and education, particularly as the chief executive director and chairperson of the Catholic Education Commission of Victoria	
Professor John Allan Eisman	For service to medical research, particularly in the field of metabolic bone disease and the prevention and treatment of osteoporosis	
Emeritus Professor Bryan Thomas Emmerson	For service to medicine and research in the fields of nephrology and rheumatology	
Dr Eric Lancelot French	For service to scientific research	
Lady Persia Elspbeth Galleghan, OBE	For service to the community, the arts and youth, particularly through philanthropy and personal support for many organisations including the Australia Red Cross Society, Australian Opera Foundation, Friends of the Sydney Symphony Orchestra and the Sydney City Mission	
The Honourable Eric Roger Goldsworthy	For service to politics, to the parliament of South Australia and to the community	
Hayes Gordon, OBE	For service to the arts, particularly the acting profession and the theatre and to the community	
Denis John Ives	For service to industrial development and restructuring policies, to industrial relations, and to public sector management and reform.	
Professor David Roy Lindsay	For service to agricultural science and to the wool industry in the fields of reproductive physiology and quantitative breeding behaviour of sheep, and to the community	
The Honourable Ian William Payne McCall	For service to the law, particularly as Chief Judge of the Family Court of Western Australia, to legal education and to the community	
Graeme William McGregor	For service to the accountancy profession, particularly in the improvement of the quality of Australian accounting and auditing standards, and to the community	
Dr Heather May Munro	For service to medicine in the field of obstetrics and gynaecology, and to the Royal Australian College of Obstetricians and Gynaecologists	
His Excellency The Honourable Kerry Walter Sibraa	For service to the Parliament of Australia, to international relations and to the community	
Hagen Heinz Stehr	For service to the commercial fishing industry and to education and training, particularly through the South Australian Fishing and Seafood Industry Skills Centre Inc.	
Professor Colin Martin Tatz	For service to the community through research into social and legal justice for people disadvantaged by their race, particularly the Aboriginal community, and to promoting the equal participation in community life of all Australians	
David Egmont Theile	For service to surgery, particularly through the Royal Australasian College of Surgeons	
Sir Ian (Graham) Turbott, CMG, CVO	For service to the community, education, and the arts, particularly through the University of Western Sydney and the Australian Cancer Foundation for Medical Research	
The Honourable George Henry Walters	For service to the law as a judge of the Supreme Court of South Australia, to legal education, and to the community	

=== Member (AM) ===
==== General Division ====
Recipient	Citation	Notes
Lynly Sheila Aitken	For service to the community, particularly to nursing and aged care	
Susan Marie Alberti	For services to the community through the Juvenile Diabetes Foundation of Australia	
Emeritus Professor Charlotte Morrison Anderson	For service to medicine in the field of paediatric gastroenterology, particularly through research in the areas of cystic fibrosis and coeliac disease	
Walter Edward David Bateman	For service to fishing, particularly through the preservation of fish habitats	
George Deas Brown	For service to the community, particularly through the Winston Churchill Fellows Association and the National Trust of Tasmania	
Barbara Buick	For service to women, particularly through EEO Tribunal in WA and to librarianship and publishing, particularly through the promotion of children's literature	
Professor Margaret Irene Bullock	For service in the field of physiotherapy, particularly as a research leader, academic and administrator	
Barbara Amy Cail	For service to business and management, particularly as an advocate for women as entrepreneurs in business	
Patricia Gloria Callaghan	For service to people with disabilities and to community organisations	
Alan John Cameron	For service to the law, to commerce and to public administration	
Brother Kelvin Brian John Canavan	For service to education as the Executive Director of Catholic Schools in the Archdiocese of Sydney	
Arthur Edward Carr	For service to the manufacturing industry, particularly in the design and export of furniture and to the community	
Leslie Anthony Cassar	For service to the travel industry and to the development of Maltese/Australian relations	
Roy McGregor Christie	For service to the law, particularly as Under-Secretary of the Crown Law Department Western Australia	
William Joseph Clancy	For service to the community and to health care through promoting education and research	
Dr Doreen Veronica Clark	For service to science, particularly chemical analysis through business and education and as President of the Royal Australian Chemical Institute	
Adele Cohen	For service to community health through the Diabetes Research Foundation, to the Jewish community and to the arts in Western Australia	
Francis Bertram Colquhoun	For service to aeronautical engineering, aviation and air transport industry	
Janet Viola Coombs	For service to women in law, particularly through the Women's Lawyers' Association and the St Thomas Moore Society	
Evelyn Mary Dill-Macky	For service to swimming as an Olympic team administrator and as President of Australian Swimming Inc.	
Garry Keith Downes	For service to the law as a barrister, educator and Executive Officer of many legal organisations, including President of the International Association of Lawyers	
George Colliver Dunstan	For service to paralympic sports and as Chef de Mission of the Australian team at the Paralympic Games, Atlanta 1996	
Dr Brian Eric Dwyer	For service to medicine, particularly in the fields of anaesthetics, pain management and palliative care	
Donald Frederick Ezekiel	For service to the optometric profession and to the development of the scleral contact lens	
Warren John Fahey	For service to Australian music and Australian folklore, particularly as a record producer, broadcaster, author, collector and performer	
Bruce Norman Fay	For service to children with disabilities, particularly through the Autistic Children's Association of QLD	
Paul Desmond Fitzgerald	For service to art, particularly as a portrait painter	
Eudo Carlile Fox	For service to engineering, particularly in the electrical and mechanical fields as a manufacturer and administrator	
Rayham Stanley Francis	For service to primary industry, particularly through the Grazier's Association of South East Queensland and rural industry training	
Professor Neil David Gallagher	For service to medicine, particularly as Director of the A W Morrow Department of Gastroenterology at Royal Prince Alfred Hospital	
Harry Christian Giese MBE	For service to the community, particularly as Chairman of the Menzies School of Health Research	
James Ramsay Giles	For service to the community as an advocate for multiculturalism in education and the arts, particularly through the Multicultural Education Co-ordinating Committee	
Professor Laurence Murray Gillin	For service to engineering and education, particularly in the area of continuing education programs for professional engineers.	
George Noel Gittoes	For service to art and international relations as an artist and photographer portraying the effects on the environment of war, international disasters and heavy industry	
Harold Gerald Goldstein, OBE	For service to the Jewish community particularly through the Sir Moses Montefiore Jewish home	
Professor Kenneth Leslie Goodwin	For service to literature, art administration and education	
Kenneth Maxwell Grenda	For service to the transport industry, particularly in the area of design and standards for buses and coaches	
Franklin Carrick Hadley	For service to the cotton industry, particularly through the Namoi Cotton Co-operative and Cotton Seed Distributors	
Harold Rupert Hallenstein	For service to the community as State Coroner for Victoria and through involvement with the Victorian Institute of Forensic Pathology	
Margaret Elizabeth Hamer	For service to the community, particularly as president of the Board of Management of the Queen Victoria Medical Centre	
Robin Byrne Hart	For service to the beef industry as a producer, administrator and exporter	
Professor David Victor Hawks	For service to community health in the fields of psychology and the prevention of alcohol and other drug related problems.	
Milan Hudecek	For service to people with disabilities through the invention of a laptop computer and other technology for use by people who are blind or partially sighted.	
Richard Francis Johnson	For service to motor sports particularly as a multiple winner of the Australian Touring Car Championship and the Bathurst 1000 and to the community through support of charitable organisations.	
Associate Professor Alan William Johnston	For service to people with visual impairment particularly in the field of optometric rehabilitation.	
Associate Professor Rodney Leonard Jory	For service to science education, particularly as Executive Director of the National Youth Science Forums and through the International Science Olympiads	
Professor Manfred Jurgensen	For service to literature as a novelist, poet and critic, and as founder of the journal Outrider	
David Simon Karpin	For service to business management and training education mining and the community	
Leonard Clifford Keynes	For services to veterans, particularly as President of the Western Australian Branch of the Returned and Services League.	
Geoffrey Moore King	For service to the book publishing industry and to the community	
Associate Professor Yean Leng Lim	For service to medicine and education, particularly in the field of cardiology	
Rabbi Ronald Lubofsky	For service to the Jewish community, particularly through the Victorian Council of Christians and Jews, and the Jewish Museum of Australia	
Barry John Mackinnon	For service to people with hearing impairment through the Disability Services Commission, the Speech and Hearing Centre for Deaf Children and the Deafness Council of Western Australia	
Doreen McCarthy	For service to nursing administration through the Royal Perth Hospital and Fremantle Hospital	
Patricia Margaret McNaughton	For service to the community of Newcastle through health, welfare and service organisations	
Dr Andre David Menash	For service to the chiropractic profession as a practitioner and educator	
Sister Noni Mitchell	For service to education, to health care and the Catholic Church, particularly as Worldwide Superior General of the Institute of the Blessed Virgin Mary, the Loreto Sisters	
Associate Professor Dennis William Gifford Moore	For service to information technology, particularly as head of the School of Computing Science at the Curtin University of Technology	
Harry Morgan	For service to primary industry through the apple and pear growing and exporting industries	
Frederick Halcomb Moylan	For service to the wool, mohair and cashmere industries, particularly through the marketing and promotion of textile products	
Liz Mullinar	For service to the performing arts and entertainment as a theatrical and film casting consultant, and to the community	
Dr Bruce Martin Munro	For service to the community, particularly the development of youth through the New South Wales Branch of the Scout Association of Australia, and to the Australian sugar industry	
Emeritus Professor Malcolm Eric Nairn	For service to tertiary education, particularly as Foundation Vice-Chancellor, Northern Territory University, and to veterinary science through the Australian Veterinary Association	
Neil David Noye	For service to local government and to the community of the Tasman Peninsula and for the provision of leadership and support to those affected by the Port Arthur tragedy	
Richard John Donald Oliver	For service to business and commerce through the insurance industry, particularly through the development of risk management strategies	
Andrew George Padgett	For service to the forestry industry and sustainable forest management, and to the promotion of innovations in environmentally sound forest harvesting, transport and replanting techniques	
Dr Vicki Pearson	For service to the community in the field of alcohol and drug rehabilitation through the development of innovative programmes to prevent drug-related deaths and to bring about a reduction in the incidence of HIV/AIDS	
Godfrey Eugene Priest	For service to veterans, particularly as president of the New South Wales branch of the Returned and Services League of Australia	
Eric Kevin Prince, ED	For service to the valuation and property profession through the Australian Institute of Valuers and Land Economists, and in the promotion of international valuation and appraisal standards	
Dr Lynette Maree Roberts	For service to the community and to health, particularly in the field of health promotion, cancer prevention awareness and lifestyle education	
Toni Fae Robinson	For service to local government and to the community as mayor of the rural city of Murray Bridge since 1989, and as an advocate for improved water resources management in the Murray-Darling River Basin	
Mary Eileen Salter	For service to the community as an advocate for the rights of deaf and hearing-impaired people	
Dr James Francis Scattini	For service to medicine and to health care through the provision of medical and surgical care in remote regions of the Northern Territory for over 30 years	
Herbert Ronald Shields	For service to land development and housing through the Urban Development Institute and the New South Wales Housing Industry Indicative Planning Council	
Jeffrey John William (Bill) Siganto	For service to tertiary education and vocational training, particularly as Chairman, Queensland Vocational Education, Training and Employment Commission since 1991, to the air conditioning industry and to the engineering profession	
Professor Peter Bryan Spradbrow	For service to veterinary science, particularly in the areas of veterinary education	
Professor Charles Thomas Stannage	For service to the community, particularly through promoting the study of history in the community and as a contributor to museum development in Australia	
Bruce William Stannard	For service to community, particularly in promoting community awareness of Australia’s maritime history through the Australian National Maritime Museum and the HM Bark Endeavour Project	
Gailene Patricia Stock-Norman	For service to ballet as director of the Australian Ballet School, and to furthering the quality of dance education and performance	
June Margaret Swales	For service to oncology and palliative care nursing and to the community in promoting cancer awareness and education	
Professor Ngoc Trang Thomas	For service to the community in the areas of aged care and ethnic affairs	
William Michael Chadwick Thomas	For service to medicine through the provision of surgical services in rural Western Australia	
Professor Barry Stephen Thornton	For service to education in the field of applied mathematics and computer science and in the promotion of research through the Foundation for Australian Resources	
Geoffrey Arthur Tombs	For service to gemmology through the Gemmological Association of Australia and the Jewellers and Allied Trades Valuers' Council	
Dr John Edward Vercoe	For service to the cattle industry through research into genetic factors affecting the efficiency of beef production in tropical environments	
Dr John Powell Waller, RFD, ED	For service to medicine and to medical administration as medical superintendent of the Mater Misericordiae Hospital since 1978 and through the Queensland branch of the Australian Medical Association and the Royal Australian College of Medical Administrators	
Dr Charles Harold Warman	For service to engineering and to the mining industry, particularly through the development of slurry pumps, and to the community	
Dr Ruth Hilary White	For service to nursing as a pioneer and leader in nursing education and health care, and to the community in the care of the disadvantaged and people with AIDS-related illnesses	
Barbara Elizabeth Worley	For service to the community, as an advocate for the development of sport for people with disabilities	
Dr James Edwin Wright	For service to medicine in the field of paediatric surgery medical education and health administration of the Newcastle area for over 30 years	

==== Military Division ====
Branch	Recipient	Citation	Notes
Navy	Captain Brian Lee Adams	For exceptional service to training and warfare development in a broad range of highly demanding postings and functional areas	
Navy	Captain Peter Graeme Habersberger RFD, RANR	For exceptional service to the Royal Australian Navy, particularly in the integration of members of the Australian Naval Reserve	
Navy	Lieutenant Paul John Whittaker	For exceptional service to the Royal Australian Navy, particularly as the Warrant Officer of the Navy	
Army	Lieutenant Colonel Mark Davey	For exceptional service to the Army in the field of logistics	
Army	Colonel David Keith Jamison	For exceptional service as the Director of Capital Procurement, Melbourne	
Army	Brigadier Raymond Leslie McCann OBE	For exceptional service in the field of defence facilities and army accommodation and works	
Army	Brigadier Paul Stacy O'Sullivan	For exceptional service to the army in the fields of operations and defence representation	
Army	Colonel Bruce Charles Whiting	For exceptional service to the Army in the field of logistics	
Air Force	Wing Commander Tony Kenneth Austin	For service to the aviation and general medicine in the Royal Australian Air Force and the US Air Force Air Combat	
Air Force	Wing Commander Anthony Elvin Kempnich	For exceptional service to C130 Hercules pilot training in the Royal Australian Air Force	

=== Medal (OAM) ===
==== General Division ====
Recipient	Citation	Notes
Elva Jessie Abrahams	For services to community health, particularly through the Drug and Alcohol Services Council of South Australia	
Nancy Mabel Adams	For service to the community in the Newcastle and Lake Macquarie area, particularly through the Girl Guides Association, the Scout Association, surf life-saving and the Australian Sports Medicine Federation	
Peter Houghton Ainsworth	For service to the Returned and Services League, Bush Nursing and ARC	
Pauline Fay Albon	For services to the community, particularly through the Australian Red Cross Society	
Meryl Lindsay Allworth	For service to the community of Holbrook	
Robert Cooper Allworth	For service to music as a composer and as an advocate of other Australian composers' works	
Stanley Alexander Ambrose	For service to mechanical engineering, through the development of Australian standards for safety in the pressure equipment industry	
Olga Patricia Anderson	For service to the community, particularly through the Coast Centre for Seniors, Soroptomist International and CanTeen	
Michelle Andrews	For service to sport as a gold medallist at the Atlanta Olympic Games, 1996	
Troy Andrews	For service to sport as a gold medallist at the Atlanta Paralympic Games, 1996	
Unity Andrews	For service to the support and care of widows of ex-servicemen through the St George Sutherland Widow's Club and the Jacaranda Club	
Alyson Annan	For service to sport as a gold medallist at the Atlanta Olympic Games, 1996	
Peter Thomas Arnott	For service to youth through the Wirraway Christian Youth Centre	
Julia Antonina Xenia Arnott	For service to youth through the Wirraway Christian Youth Centre	
Albert Ralph Arthur	For service to the community, particularly through the Winston Churchill Memorial Trust and Meals on Wheels	
Hazel St Barbe Atkinson	For service to people with disabilities and special needs, particularly to access to independent living	
Thomas Herbert Atterby	For service to agriculture and to the Fitzgerald/Jerramungup community	
Anthony Thomas Atwood	For service to the community, particularly through the Wentworth Falls Autumn Festival and other local organisations	
Bianca Baldassi	For service to the Italian community, particularly the frail and elderly through the Association of Senior Italian Citizen's Clubs of VIC and the Italian Pensioners Club of Northcote	
Donald Barber	For service to the community through fundraising projects and the support of health and aged care services	
John Barnett	For service to the community, particularly through the Epilepsy Association of South Australia	
Ruth Barratt	For service to the koala habitat of the Northern Rivers area, New South Wales through rescuing, caring for and financing the veterinary and other needs of sick koalas	
Neville William Bayfield	For service to the Royal Life Saving Society and to raising standard and awareness of life saving education	
Graham Louis Benjamin	For service to education as a teacher and administrator, particularly in relation to Aboriginal students	
Dr Vasilios Antonios Berdoukas	For service to paediatric medicine, particularly the diagnosis of haemoglobinopathies	
Peter Francis Bergin	For service to the community, particularly through the support of charitable organisations and the promotion of fund-raising events	
Frank Terence Berryman	For service to the community and scouting	
Hazel Maude Beswick	For service to the community and the aged	
Dr John Henry Winter Birrell, ISO	For service to medicine and the community through the introduction of measures to reduce alcohol related road trauma and as an advocate of child abuse as a significant social problem	
Fabian John Blattman	For service to sport as a gold medallist at the Atlanta Paralympic Games, 1996	
Rosslyn Lydia Mary Blay	For service to the Parramatta community, to business and to women, particularly through Soroptomist International.	
Robert Blythe	For service to sport as a gold medallist at the Atlanta Paralympic Games, 1996	
Robert Godier Bottom	For service to the community and to journalism through the investigation and reporting of organised crime in Australia	
Arthur Edgar Woodfield Bowley	For service to the community, particularly through music and fundraising projects	
Norman Braithwaite	For service to the community, particularly through the arts and local history	
Paul Noel Brandy	For service to the community, through improving Police/Aboriginal relations particularly as a member of the Aboriginal Friends Call Out Roster and the Aboriginal Police Liaison Sub Committee.	
Dawn Valerie Breden	For service to the welfare of veterans and their families	
Allen Maxwell Brice	For service to the community and veterans, particularly through the Honour Avenue Committee	
Alexander George Briggs	For service to the community through the Balwyn Returned and Services League, Canterbury Memorial Homes and the Balwyn Community Centre	
Donald Leonard Brodie	For service to the sport of athletics, particularly as a coach and to dog training as an instructor and founder of the Tracking and Rescue Dog Club of New South Wales	
Kirsty Margaret Brown	For service to the community through the Scout Association, particularly as leader and trainer	
Margaret Uriel Brown	For service to the community, particularly through the Canberra Youth Theatre and to motor sports	
Daphne Joyce Brown	For service to the community through St John Ambulance Australia	
Denis James Buckley	For service to four successive Governors of QLD as Lodgekeeper and Sergeant-at-Arms, and to the community through the Lyons Club and Cystic Fibrosis Association	
Kingsley Haldane Bugarin	For service to sport as a gold medallist at the Atlanta Paralympic Games, 1996	
Brendan John Burkett	For service to sport as a gold medallist at the Atlanta Paralympic Games, 1996	
Damien Alexander Burroughs	For service to sport as a gold medallist at the Atlanta Paralympic Games, 1996	
Brian Paul Caddy	For service to local government and to the community of the Riverland area of South Australia	
Joy Miriam Cairns	For service to people with disabilities	
Beryl Carey	For service to the community, particularly through the Wallamba District Show Society	
Melissa Paula Carlton	For service to sport as a gold medallist at the Atlanta Paralympic Games, 1996	
Patricia Margaret Carr	For service to occupational health and safety in the construction industry through the initiation and implementation of preventive and rehabilitation programmes	
Orfeo Cecconato	For services to sport as a gold medallist at the Atlanta Paralympic Games, 1996	
Margaret Alison Chambers	For services to the aged, particularly through the Harbison Memorial Retirement Village and to the community through church, school and welfare groups	
Jean Chambers	For services to the community and the education of girls through the organisation of fundraising projects	
Iris Irene Chappel	For service to the community, particularly in the areas of aged care, the delivery of health and welfare services and support for youth, church and women's groups	
Reuben Bernard Charles	For service to apiculture through the Tasmanian Beekeepers' Association, The Australian Apiarists' Association and the Tasmanian Honey Committee	
Margaret Alice Charles	For service to education, particularly in the area of speech and drama and to the community through Soroptomist International	
Joan May Cheetham	For service to the aged through the NSW Pensioner's and Superannuants' Federation	
Shirley Ruth Chiller	For service to women in sport, particularly through the Active Achievers Programme and the Australian Modern Pentathlon Union	
Dr Dorothy Laurel Pauline Chong	For service to the community and to medicine, particularly in the field of general practice and care for the aged	
Ruth Chong, MBE	For service to the community, particularly through charitable activities and the promotion of multiculturalism	
Josef Chromy	For service to business and industry, particularly the meat processing industry	
Barden Thomas Claffey	For service to the community through service clubs, sporting and church groups	
Francis Western Clark	For service to local government and the community, particularly through the Copmanhurst Shire Council, the Clarence River County Council and the Shires Association of New South Wales	
Anthony Laurence Clarke	For service to sport as a gold medallist at the Atlanta Paralympic Games, 1996	
Jessie Deakin Clarke	For service to community health and welfare	
Albert Joseph Briton Cliff	For service to the community through organisations including ex-service, church, women's senior citizens' and sporting clubs	
Damien Kevin Giuseppe Codognotto	For service to the Motorcycle Rider's Association of Australia toy drives, blood donation campaigns and road safety promotion	
David Edward Coldbeck	For service to the community through the Hamilton Regional Headquarters of the State Emergency Services, sporting and community groups	
Peter George Cominos	For service to the community, particularly through the Far North QLD Youth Assistance Fund and as a philanthropist and fundraiser	
Beverly Joyce Cook	For service to local government and to the community, particularly through school councils, health and welfare services	
Norma Kathleen Courtney	For service to the community, particularly rural women through the Country Women's Association	
Emeritus Professor Kenneth Russell Cox	For service to medical education and to the World Health Organisation through the Expert Committee on Human Resources for Health and the Regional Training Centre for Health personnel, Western Pacific Region	
Benjamin Richard Cox	For service to veterans	
Ian David Craig	For service to the sport of cricket as a player and administrator through the Sydney Cricket and Sports Ground Trust	
Constance Beatrice Craig	For service to people with visual impairment through transcribing textbooks and novels into Braille	
Colin Eric Crawford	For service to the community, particularly as a fundraiser for the NSW Spastic Centre, Rotary International and to sport	
Alva Jean Crebbin	For service to the community, particularly the ACT Cancer Society and the Hospice Palliative Care Society	
Harold Joseph Creek	For service to veterans and their families through the RSL and to the community through the 'Australia Remembers 1945-95' ceremonies	
Cecil Thomas Cripps	For service to the sport of cycling as a competitor and administrator	
Henry James Cummings	For service to the community through the Lions Club International, The White Cane Committee, the Safety House Project, Meals on Wheels and school committees	
Walter James Curran	For service to the trade union movement, particularly through initiating improvements in health and safety standards for the meat industry workers and to the support and development of the arts	
Commander Geoffrey Edwin Curran	For service to youth, particularly through the Naval Reserve Cadets in Western Australia	
Therese Catherine D'Arcy	For service to education as a speech and drama teacher and examiner	
Dur-e Najaf Dara	For service to the community and to promotional and fundraising activities for women's groups	
Joanne Mavis Dash	For service to the sport of netball	
Gemma Joan Dashwood	For service to sport as a gold medallist at the Atlanta Paralympic Games, 1996	
Neil Davidson	For service to Fire and Emergency Services in the Mandurah area, and the development of training programmes in high schools	
Francis Joseph Davidson	For service to the arts as an entertainer and to the support of charitable organisations	
Ernest Davis	For service to sports administration and coaching of surf lifesaving	
Constance Anne de Dassell	For service to the community through staging musical entertainments to raise funds for charitable organisations and sports clubs	
Ramon De Vere, MC	For service to the veterans, particularly through the Queensland branches of the Returned and Services League of Australian and the Vietnam Veterans’ Association	
Warwick Michael Mortimer Deacock	For service to conservation and the environment, particularly through the Chakola Wildlife Refuge, Kangaroo Valley	
Michael Constantine Diamond	For service to sport as a gold medallist at the Atlanta Olympic Games, 1996	
Lylah Melrose Diamond	For service to the people with disabilities, particularly in establishing work preparation schemes and facilitating independent living	
Dr John Grant Dickson	For service to medicine and to the community, particularly as a surgeon and educator in the field of otolaryngology	
Anthony Dieni	For service to the community through the St Paul's Drug Rehabilitation Centre for people with addictions to drugs and alcohol	
Louise Karen Dobson	For service to sport as a gold medallist at the Atlanta Olympic Games, 1996	
David John Dodds, CMG	For service to the community through sporting clubs, the Scouting movement and the Innisfail District Show Society	
Frances Evelyn Donnelly	For service to aged care and to veterans in Queensland, particularly through the Ex-Australian Army Medical Women's Service Association, the Council of Ex-Servicewomen's Association and the War Widow's Guild	
Mary Stewart Douglas, OBE	For service to veterans, particularly through the Royal Australian Army Corps Association and the 'Australia Remembers 1945-1995 celebrations	
Jeannette Dowda	For service to the community, particularly through the fundraising projects of the Royal North Shore Hospital Ladies' Committee	
Alexander Davidson Dustan	For service to the sport of cycling as a sports administrator for over 25 years	
Phillip Peter Dutton	For service to sport as a gold medallist at the Atlanta Olympic Games, 1996	
Leonard John Earley	For service to the community and local government, particularly through the Meander Valley and Deloraine Councils and the Local Government Association of Tasmania	
Jenifer Edna Eddy	For service to arts administration, through the management and promotion of opera and concert artists	
Evangelos Efstratiadis	For service to the Greek community and to veterans, particularly through the Greek Returned and Services League Sub-Branch	
Maisie Wishart Enders	For service to conservation through the care of injured, sick and orphaned native animals and birds	
Marjorie Lascelles Esler	For service to the community, particularly through the Cobram District Hospital and Meals on Wheels	
David Martin Evans	For service to sport as a gold medallist at the Atlanta Paralympic Games, 1996	
Stuart James Ewin	For service to sport as a gold medallist at the Atlanta Paralympic Games, 1996	
Janelle Cherie Falzon	For service to sport as a gold medallist at the Atlanta Paralympic Games, 1996	
Renita Maree Farrell	For service to sport as a gold medallist at the Atlanta Olympic Games, 1996	
Leonard Maxwell Fisher	For service to veterans through the Tasmanian Branch of the Totally and Permanently Incapacitated Soldier's Association	
David Hay Fraser	For service to the aged people by assisting residents in nursing homes in Canberra and as a narrator of audio books	
Jeffrey Douglas Fraser	For service to veterans through the Doncaster RSL Sub-Branch and the 'Australia Remembers 1945-1995' celebrations	
Walter Donald Frater	For service to the community, particularly as a member of the Sacred Heart Conference and Inverell Regional Council of the Society of St Vincent de Paul Society	
Ralph Arthur Freeman	For service to sport, particularly through Motorcycling Queensland and the community	
Andrew Balsillie Frizzell, OBE	For service to the surf life-saving movement, particularly through the establishment and promotion of the junior movement	
Catherine Adelaide Marcelle Frost	For service to the sport of lawn bowls at club, state and national levels and to the community	
William Robin Galvin	For service to tourism through Tourism Training Australia, the Tourism Council of Australia, the Tourism Taskforce and the Catering Institute of Australia	
Neil Arthur Galwey	For service to engineering and to energy research	
Rose May Jean Garside	For service to the community through the St George Anglican Parish, Reservoir, for over 40 years	
Mary Ellen Gibson	For service to the community through the Australian Red Cross Society, the local hospital's auxiliaries, the Legacy Widow's Club and the Combined Pensioner's Association	
Sonia Ann Gidley-King	For service to the community as founder and co-coordinator of the project 'Wrap With Love' involving 20,000 people knitting scrap wool into wraps for people in need in Australia and war devastated countries overseas	
Drew Cameron Ginn	For service to sport as a gold medallist at the Atlanta Olympic Games, 1996	
Joan Mary Giumelli	For service to education, particularly in the field of literacy development	
Joan Glennie	For service to the Newtown United Co-operative Building Association Limited since 1960 and to the Panania Corps of the Salvation Army	
Keith Norman Glover	For service to the community through the Royal Victorian Institute for the Blind, 3RPH (Radio Print Handicapped), the Masonic Homes for the Aged and the credit union movement	
Kerry Joan Golding	For service to sport as a gold medallist at the Atlanta Paralympic Games, 1996	
Nikola Gotovac	For service to the Serbian community	
David Ian Gould	For service to sport as a gold medallist at the Atlanta Paralympic Games, 1996	
Jack Merton Gowen	For service to the community and to the macadamia nut industry	
Charles John Grace	For service to veterans through the Umina and District Totally and Permanently Disabled Soldiers' Association	
Robert Douglas Grant	For service to community through the Cerebral Palsy Association of Western Australia	
Ernest Hedley Green	For service to the community, through sporting and service organisations including the fire brigade, school committees, the show society, the Parkes RSL Sub-Branch and the Australia Remembers 1945-95 Committee	
Dulcie Phyllis Hagan	For service to the community, particularly through the Australian Red Cross Society, the Maroondah Hospital and the Walmsley Residents’ Committee	
Mary Isa Hall	For service to people with disabilities as president of the Handihome Sunnybank Management Committee responsible for a permanent residence for people with severe disabilities	
Noel William Hall, ED	For service to veterans and to the community as president of both the 39th Battalion Association and Hawthorn Small Bore Club, as founder of the Victorian International Rifle Club and as an executive member of the Antique and Historic Arms Collectors’ Guild of Victoria	
Mary Galloway Handley	For service to music, particularly to opera in South Australia	
Jeffrey Lewis Hardy	For service to sport as a gold medallist at the Atlanta Paralympic Games, 1996	
Edward Roy Hargreaves	For service to conservation of Australian native orchids and to the Native Orchid Society of South Australia	
Councillor Ronald Frederick Harris	For service to the community, particularly through the Wagga Wagga City Council, and the Shire of Mitchell	
Dr Digby Ian Harris	For service to community health, particularly as an executive committee member of the Nhill and District Intellectually Handicapped Persons’ Welfare Association, the Cooinda Day Care Centre, the Avonlea Old Folks’ Home and the Nhill Hospital Board of Management	
Brian Harry Harvey	For service to sport as a gold medallist at the Atlanta Paralympic Games, 1996	
Juliet Haslam	For service to sport as a gold medallist at the Atlanta Olympic Games, 1996	
Roger Gerard Heagney	For service to church music as an organist, harpsichordist, composer, choir master and director of music at St Francis’ Church, Melbourne	
William Murray Heck	For service to primary industry as a sugarcane farmer/miller and as an executive member of the Australian Sugar Milling Council, and for service to the community	
Narelle Christine Henderson	For service to youth through the Thorneside Kids’ Club and the Redlands Referral and Assessment Programme, and to young people with disabilities	
Terence Hennessy	For service to the community through the Arthritis Foundation, the Nowra Music Club, the Nowra Returned and Services League Sub-Branch, the Historical Society and the Shoalhaven 'Australia Remembers 1945-95' Committee	
Gerard Benjamin Hewson	For service to sport as a gold medallist at the Atlanta Paralympic Games, 1996.	
John Whitefoorde Heyer	For service to the media as a pioneer of documentary film in Australia and as a film producer and film director	
Alan Robert Hicks	For service to tennis as a former state junior champion and as an executive member of club and state tennis organisations for 40 years	
Raymond Leslie Hill	For service to the community through the Citizens Advice Bureau, the Australia-Japan Society of Victoria, the Lions Club, the Scout Association and the Uniting Church World Mission	
Dr Allan Barry Hogan	For service to medicine in the Albury-Wodonga district for over 50 years and for service to the community	
Professor Brien Anthony Holden	For service to optometry, for contact lens research and education	
John Frederick Blake Hollonds	For service to the community through sporting organisations, the Graziers' Association, the State Emergency Service, the Scout Association and the Anglican Parish Council	
Clifford Henry Holloway	For service to the community as founder of a branch of the Catenian Association for Catholic professional and businessmen in Western Australia	
Peter David Homann	For service to sport as a gold medallist at the Atlanta Paralympic Games, 1996	
Squadron Leader Kenneth Moore Horler, (Ret'd)	For service to international relations as president of the Ranfurly Library Service (Australia) which prepares and ships over 100,000 books annually to promote literacy in developing countries	
Cecelia Wynette Horne	For service to community music as founder and director of the Waratah Girls' Choir and as a music educator	
Ronald Clive Hovey	For service to Australian Rules football as a player for and administrator of the Geelong Football Club	
Ronald McKenzie Howells	For service to surf lifesaving for over 50 years	
Maxwell Mountiford Hyde	For service to veterans as president of the Returned and Services League, Mascot Sub-Branch since 1965	
Jack Hyett	For service to conservation and the environment as an active member of the Bird Observers Club of Australia for 60 years and as the author of numerous publications on native fauna	
Ronald Keith Ireland	For service to the community through the Cairns Port Authority, the Cairns Regional Gallery Fundraising Appeal, the Far North Queensland Youth Assistance Fund, and to the automotive industry	
Jean Aileen Jans	For service to Aboriginal health and community services	
John Victor Johnson	For service to Vietnam Veterans and their families, particularly through 'Carry On' Victoria	
Dorothy Alleyn Nellie Johnson	For service to the community through the Combined Pensioners Association, the Senior Citizens Club and Meals on Wheels	
Emily Johnstone	For service to the community through the Legacy Laurel Club the War Widows' Guild and the Australian Red Cross Society	
Lachlan Stuart Jones	For service to sport as a gold medallist at the Atlanta Paralympic Games, 1996	
Derek Jones	For service to local government and to the community through the City Council, the Senior Citizens Welfare Association and Hospital and Health Services	
George William Mansel Jones	For service to community music as the conductor of the Toowoomba Choral Society senior and junior choirs for over 30 years	
June Jorgenson	For service to veterans through the Australian Legion of Ex-Servicemen and Women and the Women's Royal Australian Naval Service	
Janice Helen Joyce	For service to the United Graziers' Association, The Graziers' Association of South-Eastern Queensland and the Cattle Council of Queensland	
The Reverend Father John Kapetas	For service to the aged as chaplain and administrator of the Saint Basil Homes and through the establishment of an outreach care programme	
Henry Mervyn Kelly	For service to the community through the Port Adelaide Central Mission	
David William King	For service to people with physical disabilities, through the Northcott Society and the New South Wales Wheelchair Sports Association	
Dr Edward Phillip Kremer	For service to medicine and to the community	
Jaromir Jan Kusnik	For service to the arts through the Ceramic Study Group of Western Australia, and as a lecturer in ceramic chemistry and technology	
Edna Laing	For service to the arts and literature through the Creativity Centre, Brisbane	
Robert Hunter Fairbairn Landale	For service to the community through the Yanco Creek and Tributaries Advisory Council and the Deniliquin Council	
Ann Mary Larkins	For service to paediatric nursing, the aged and the community	
Alan Douglas Larsen	For service to the community, particularly through youth and sporting organisations	
Kathleen Annie Laurie	For service to the community, particularly the aged, through Twilight House Hostels for the Aged	
Betty Lawrie	For service to community health through the support of oncology after-care services in Geelong	
Clive Touzeau Le Page	For service to the community through involvement with the local council, church and sporting organisations	
Rosa Florence Lee	For service to the community of Balnarring and Hastings, particularly through the Country Women’s Association, the Senior Citizens Club and the Australian Red Cross Society	
Jean Dorothea Lehmann	For service to music as a violin teacher, examiner and adjudicator	
Linton Roy Lethlean	For service to the community through involvement in the restoration of the Royal Exhibition Building, Melbourne, and as Chairman of the Victorian Horticultural Export Council	
Lisa Christina Llorens	For service to sport as a gold medallist at the Atlanta Paralympic Games, 1996	
Arnold Dew Lockyer	For service to the community as a member of St John Ambulance South Australia for over 50 years	
Lesley Ann Lowth	For service to the community as local coordinator of the Queensland Cancer Fund’s Nurse of the Year campaign since 1974, and as chairman of the Ingham Branch	
Jessie Sheila Luckman	For service to the community and to music as a performer and broadcaster	
William Patrick Ludwig	For service to industrial relations through the Australian Workers’ Union	
Dr Rodney Hugh Lumer	For service to the arts through the promotion and publication of works by Australian playwrights	
Hamish Anderson MacDonald	For service to sport as a gold medallist at the Atlanta Paralympic Games, 1996	
Jack Hamilton Mack	For service to St Andrew’s Hospital and to the insurance industry	
Clement Francis MacMahon	For service to community health through cancer education programs and to adult education as principal of Sutherland Shire Evening College for 19 years	
Charles Douglas Macrae	For service to the Dorrigo district through numerous community and service organisations	
Ruth Mainsbridge	For service to the community and to education, through home economics at secondary and tertiary levels	
Clover Maitland	For service to sport as a gold medallist at the Atlanta Olympic Games, 1996	
Timothy Ian Maloney	For service to sport as a gold medallist at the Atlanta Paralympic Games, 1996	
Dorothy Jean Malouf	For service to the Central Council of Lantern Clubs and the Cronulla Lantern Club	
Richard Eric Mann	For service to sport and to youth as trainer of Goulburn Valley Schoolboys Football Association for 32 years, and as trainer of the Katandra Football Club for 40 years	
Russell Andrew Mark	For service to sport as a gold medallist at the Atlanta Olympic Games, 1996	
Karen Elizabeth Marsden	For service to sport as a gold medallist at the Atlanta Olympic Games, 1996	
Eunice May Marshall	For service to the community through the Girl Guides Association of Western Australia for over 50 years	
Merle Honor Marten	For service to the community through involvement and support for charities and community service organisations	
Dulcie Elizabeth Martin	For service to the community, particularly through the Coffs Harbour Australia Day Committee, the Friends of the North Coast Regional Botanic Gardens, the Museum Committee and the Historical Society	
Irene Emanuel Maskell	For service to the performing arts, to education and to youth	
Zoran Matic	For service to sport through the South Australian Soccer Federation and the Adelaide City Soccer Club	
Timothy Shaun Matthews	For service to sport as a gold medallist at the Atlanta Paralympic Games, 1996	
Cathy Ann Matthews	For service to the community, particularly in the area of support for the victims of abuse	
Dr Charles Prince Mattner	For service to community health, particularly in the area of general practice in the Woodside and Onkaparinga districts for over 30 years	
(Eileen) Marjorie Maughan, CBE	For service to the community, particularly through the Country Women's Association of Western Australia for over 60 years	
Marie Josephine Evans McCann	For service to the community through the Australian Church Women, the Melbourne University Alumni and the New South Wales Council for Children’s Film and Television	
Marion Betty McCarthy	For service to education through the Health in Schools Parent Reference Group, the Department for Education and Children’s Services and the Senior Secondary Assessment Board of South Australia	
Harold Mervyn McCowen	For service to the local community, particularly through the Tenterfield Shire Council, the New South Wales Farmers’ Association and the Bolivia Progress Association	
Stewart Alfred McDonald	For service to the community, particularly coordinating civic projects using community-based workers	
Colin Wellington McIntyre	For service to local government as a councillor on the Beaudesert Shire Council since 1976, and to the community as a visitor to the Palen Creek Correctional Centre, and as president of the Rathdowney Area Development and Historical Association for many years	
James Alexander Smith McKenzie	For service to the community and the arts as a painter and illustrator, particularly through the Eden Killer Whale Museum	
Gordon McNaughton	For service to surf-lifesaving at club, branch and state levels	
Walter Nicholas Miles	For service to the community and to veterans, particularly through the Doncaster Sub-Branch of the Returned and Services League and the Carry On Club	
Marjorie Miller	For service to the community as founder member and treasurer/financial adviser of the Wanneroo Employment Skills Training Network	
Peter James Minturn	For service to the community, particularly through the Hawkesbury State Emergency Service, and to local government as a councillor on the City of Hawkesbury Council	
Eugenia Mitrakas	For service to the Greek community through the Australian Greek Society for the Care of the Elderly since 1985, the Australian Greek Welfare Society and the Hellenic Studies Forum	
Kieran John Modra	For service to sport as a gold medallist at the Atlanta Paralympic Games, 1996	
Joan Bradley Moore	For service to the community, particularly as a pharmacist for over 50 years, and to the aged through the St Andrew’s Nursing Home “Olunda”	
Bernice Constant Moore	For service to children with disabilities at the Regency park School, and to the community through Meals On Wheels and Trees for Life	
Dorothy Faye Morgan	For service to the community of Rossmoyne and to the Palliative Care Unit, Hollywood Hospital and the Cottage Hospice, Shenton Park	
Jennifer Lyn Morris	For service to sport as a gold medallist at the Atlanta Olympic Games, 1996	
Nicholas Hugh Morris	For service to sport as a gold medallist at the Atlanta Paralympic Games, 1996	
Major Hilton Wilfred Morris	For service with the Guide Dogs for the Blind Association of Queensland	
Major Wilga Ruth Morris	For service to the community through the Salvation Army in rural Australia and the Northern Territory	
Dr John Egan Moulton	For service to surgery and medical education, particularly in relation to sports medicine through the New South Wales Institute of Sports Medicine at Concord Hospital	
Dr John Stuart Newlinds	For service to medicine in the field of obstetrics and gynaecology for over 40 years, and to the Medical Benevolent Association of New South Wales	
Mary Helen Newport	For service to the community through the National Catholic Media Office and the Newman Graduate Association, and for public service	
Donald Andrew Nicolson	For service to conservation and the environment as an advocate and practitioner of Landcare programmes, as a contributor to arid land ecology, and to the community	
William George Nixon	For service to local government in the City of Kingston, and to the community	
Julie Dawn Nykiel	For service to basketball as a player representing Australia on over 150 occasions, and to netball	
Melia Helen O'Donnell	For service to youth, particularly through the Girl Guides movement and Ascham School	
Elizabeth Groves O'Keefe	For service to the community, particularly through the St Patrick’s Festival Ball Committee, local charities and community organisations	
Hugh Ian O'Loan	For service to local government through the Mid-North Local Government Region Inc. and to the community	
Susan O'Neill	For service to sport as a gold medallist at the Atlanta Olympic Games, 1996	
Richard Alden Oliver	For service to sport as a gold medallist at the Atlanta Paralympic Games, 1996	
Geoffrey William Olsen	For service to the Dungog community through service, health and welfare organisations	
Kevin John Owens	For service to the community through welfare and sporting organisations including the Society of St Vincent de Paul and the Northern Metropolitan Football League	
Henry Nan Hung Pan	For service to the community, particularly through the Chinese Australian Services Society and the Elderly Australian Chinese Homes Co-Operative Ltd	
The Reverend Noel Roy Park	For service to the community, particularly as director of Lifeline in the Darling Downs and South West Queensland	
John Neil Parker	For service to local government	
Gordon Holroyd Parker	For service to veterans through the British Commonwealth Occupation Forces Japan Association	
David George Walter Parkinson	For service to local government through the Richmond River Shire Council, the Northern Regional Organisation of Councils and the North Eastern Local Government Association	
Peter Parr	For service to chess as a player, including six times Australian Olympic Captain, and as an administrator, tournament organiser, columnist and international arbiter	
Michael Pate	For service to the performing arts as an actor, producer and writer for the Australian film, radio and television industries	
Douglas Morley Patrick	For service to the community, particularly in the area of aged care and in the development of youth programmes	
Hugh Archibald Patterson	For service to the community through the Society of St Vincent de Paul for over 50 years as a prison, nursing home and hospital visitor	
Francis William Payne	For service to pharmacy through the New South Wales Pharmacy Board, the Pharmaceutical Society of Australia and the Australian Pharmacy Examining Council	
Noel Donald Pearce	For service to the community through executive membership of sporting organisations and various commemorative celebration committees	
Harold George Pearce	For service to the community through fundraising for and maintenance of the M.V. Centaur Memorial and the Walk of Remembrance, Point Danger	
Morley Asquith Fredrick Pereira	For service to the community through the Sri Lankan organisations in Victoria and the Council of Australian Sri Lankan organisations	
Nova Maree Peris-Kneebone	For service to sport as a gold medallist at the Atlanta Olympic Games, 1996	
John Morley Phillips, RFD, ED	For service to international relations as chairman of the Rotary Kokoda RSL Project Committee responsible for the provision of health facilities in Papua New Guinea	
Reginald Ernest Philpott	For service to veterans through the Blacktown, Epping and Kogarah Sub-Branches of the Returned and Services League	
William Beith Pierce	For service to music as an organist and choirmaster	
Teresa Hilda Poole	For service to sport as a gold medallist at the Atlanta Paralympic Games, 1996	
John Porter	For service to the furniture industry for over 30 years through the South Australian Guild of Furniture Manufacturers and the Confederation of Asian Chamber of Commerce and Industry Furniture Council	
Lisa Josephine Powell	For service to sport as a gold medallist at the Atlanta Olympic Games, 1996	
Katrina Maree Powell	For service to sport as a gold medallist at the Atlanta Olympic Games, 1996	
Dr Anthony Swee-Leong Pun	For service to the community, particularly through the Australian Chinese Association and the Australian Chinese Forum	
John David Andrew Punch	For service to the community through the Gold Coast Tourism Bureau, the Surfers Paradise Chamber of Commerce, the Real Estate Institute of Queensland and the Salvation Army	
Thomas Norman Quinn	For service to education, particularly in the field of vocational education and training as inaugural president of Group Training Australia	
Alwyn Darley Quoy	For service to the community as foundation president of the Kittyhawk Squadron’s Branch of the Royal Australian Air Force Association for over 40 years and as president of the 77 Squadron Association	
Sharon Margaret Rackham	For service to sport as a gold medallist at the Atlanta Paralympic Games, 1996	
Thomas Bentley Ransom	For service to the community through the Dorset Municipal Council and to the review of local government in Tasmania	
Robert Lindsay Rennick	For service to the community and to veterans, particularly through the Chincilla Returned and Services League Memorial Club	
Dr Keith Reye	For service to the community as a rural medical practitioner for over 50 years in North-West Queensland and the Shires of Kolan and Mount Perry	
Annie Reynolds	For service to the community, particularly through the Terrigal Senior Citizens and Community Centre, the Gosford District Hospital and the Terrigal-Wamberal Entertainment Group	
Eric Alexander Richardson	For service to the beef industry through the Cattleman’s Union, to local government and to the community	
Bruce John Gray Robertson	For service to the credit union movement, particularly the establishment of the Institute of Credit Union Directors and to the Esso Employees’ Credit Union, and the Association of New South Wales Credit Unions	
Danni Roche	For service to sport as a gold medallist at the Atlanta Olympic Games, 1996	
George Daniel Rose	For service to the Aboriginal community at Walgett, particularly through the Walgett Aboriginal Medical Service Co-operative, the Barwon Aboriginal Community Ltd and the Aboriginal Legal Service	
Irene Agnes Rose	For service to the community of Lake Macquarie, particularly through the Australia Day committee, the Clean Up Lake Macquarie committee, the Toronto Wetlands Group, and to children with visual impairments	
John Rowe	For service to the community through visiting and assisting patients in the psychiatric ward at Concord Repatriation General Hospital	
Richard Rozen	For service to chess and bridge and to the community, particularly through the Jewish Holocaust Museum and Research Centre	
Ellen Lola Russell	For service to the arts and to education in the areas of drama and theatrical production	
The Reverend Father John Ryan	For service to the Catholic Church and to the community as a priest of New South Wales, Victoria, Western Australia and Queensland for over 70 years	
Troy Sachs	For service to sport as a gold medallist at the Atlanta Paralympic Games, 1996	
Wendy Lynn Schaeffer	For service to sport as a gold medallist at the Atlanta Olympic Games, 1996	
Christopher Ian Scott	For service to sport as a gold medallist at the Atlanta Paralympic Games, 1996	
Sister Genevieve Secker	For service to people with disabilities and to the establishment of Ain Karim, an independent residential community	
David Thomas Selby	For service to sport as a gold medallist at the Atlanta Paralympic Games, 1996	
Udo Sellbach	For service to art as an artist, to the development of printmaking and to art education	
Thomas Otto Semsei	For service to business through marketing in the tyre industry.	
Pasquale Sergi	For service to people with disabilities through the Italian Affair Committee which raises funds for the Spastic Centre of New South Wales	
Ian Eric Seymour	For service to local government through the Muswellbrook Shire Council and the Local Government Association of New South Wales	
Heather Gladys Shakespeare	For service to the community through the Arthur Shakespeare Foundation for Scouting, Soroptomist International of Canberra, and involvement with other local organisations	
Ronald Hempton Sides	For service to the development of a new breed of sheep, the Elliottdale, which produces wool suitable for carpet manufacture	
Major Doreen Hilda Sigley	For service to the development of community health programmes and vocational training for women in three South African countries for over 25 years while serving with the Salvation Army	
Veronica Sladdin	For service to charity, the community and the Catholic Women’s League of South Australia for over 60 years.	
Kate Elizabeth Slatter	For service to sport as a gold medallist at the Atlanta Olympic Games, 1996	
Sandra Narelle Smith	For service to sport as gold medallist at the Atlanta Paralympic Games, 1996	
Elsie Joy Smith	For service to the community, particularly through local government and the promotion of tourism	
Dora Margaret Spencer	For service to community health through research work in the area of malaria entomology and mosquito-borne diseases	
Brigadier John Anthony Springhall, MBE RFD ED (ret’d)	For service to the community, particularly through St John Ambulance Australia, and to tropical veterinary science	
June Stacey	For service to women diagnosed with breast cancer and to the development of the Breast Cancer Support Service Volunteer Programme in Queensland	
David George Stafford	For service to junior rugby union football, and to sports administration	
Kate Starre	For service to sport as a gold medallist at the Atlanta Olympic Games, 1996	
Mavis Doreen Stevenson	For service to the community, particularly through the Country Women’s Association, ‘The Land’ cookery committee, the Australian Red Cross Society and the Albion Park Agricultural Horticultural and Industrial Show Society	
Megan Leanne Still	For service to sport as gold medallist at the Atlanta Olympic Games, 1996	
Betty Esther Stirton	For service to the community through St John Ambulance Australia for over 50 years and as chairman of the Community Care Branch	
Judith Stokes	For service to the Aboriginal community on Groote Eylandt as a missionary and linguist	
June Stone, BEM	For service to veterans, particularly through the Council of the Ex-Servicewomen’s Associations of New South Wales and the Royal Australian Air Force	
Geoffrey Kenneth Stonehouse	For service to veterans and the associations that represent them, and to the development of community awareness about young people with physical disabilities	
Allan Dean Stringer	For service to floriculture through promoting knowledge and appreciate of rose cultivation, and to community health as a member of the Board of Management of Modbury Hospital	
Helen Vivienne Strutt	For service to the Scout Association of Australia, New South Wales Branch, particularly in the formation of the Joey Scouts	
Ross Collin John Swayne	For service to the community through the Keep South Australia Beautiful and the Tidy Towns programmes	
Kathleen Jean Swift	For service to the Mount Isa branch of the Leukaemia Foundation, particularly through serving as secretary, treasurer and quest coordinator	
Kenneth John Graham Tandy	For service to the communities of Mudgeeraba and Springbrook through the School of Arts Memorial Hall, the Progress Association and the Lions Club	
Bradley James Thomas	For service to sport as a gold medallist at the Atlanta Paralympic Games, 1996	
Dr John Robert Thompson	For service to medicine and hospital administration through the Port Augusta Hospital for over 35 years	
Hugh Thomson	For service to the community of Warracknabeal and district for over 50 years in a wide range of activities, including serving on the Anzac Park Trust and the establishment of an aerodrome and aero club and the Australian Rules football club committee.	
Geoffrey Francis Trevor-Hunt	For service to veterans, particularly as National Secretary of the Vietnam Veterans’ Association of Australia	
Sydney John Trigellis-Smith	For service to military history as a researcher, author and publisher of several unit histories of campaigns of World War II	
Owen Hobart Tuckey	For service to the community of Mandurah through the Peel Inlet Management Authority and sporting and commercial organisations	
Kemarre Margaret Mary Turner	For service to the Aboriginal community of Central Australia, particularly through preserving language and culture, and interpreting	
William Russell Tyson	For service to the community through the support of many charities, including the Queensland Society for Crippled Children, the Aid and Recreation Association for the Disabled, the Endeavour Foundation and the New South Wales Blind and Deaf Society	
Albert Henry Ullin	For service to the promotion of children’s literature in Australia and overseas	
William Robert Watkins	For service to the community and to local government, through the Kapinnie Country Fire Service, sporting clubs, church and school committees	
Betty Mitchell Watson	For service to the development of Women’s Basketball in Australia, particularly as an administrator with the Australian Women’s Basketball Council and the Victorian Women’s Basketball Association	
Katrina Lea Webb	For service to sport as a gold medallist at the Atlanta Paralympic Games, 1996	
Belinda Joy Webster	For service to the music industry through the establishment of the record company ‘Tall Poppies’ which promotes the work of Australian composers and musicians	
Douglas Bruce Weller	For service to the community, particularly through the support and sponsorship of local charities and sporting groups for the past 30 years	
Bruce Wemyss	For service to community health through the support of oncology after-care services in Geelong	
Laurus Vant Westende	For service to the community and to business and commerce, particularly through the ACT Legislative Assembly, the ACT Chamber of Commerce and Industry, Rotary, and the National Gallery of Australia	
Edna Madge White	For service to the community through the Manning Senior Citizens Association, assisting with fund-raising projects	
Donald Victor Whitehouse	For service to education, particularly as the principal of Marsden State High School, and to the community	
Berniece Louise Whitson	For service to the community, particularly through sporting activities for young people at the Ulinga Park Complex	
Trevor Henry Wholohan	For service to cricket administration for over 40 years at club, district and state levels	
John Charles Wieland	For service to the community and to veterans, particularly through the Kogarah Sub-Branch of the Returned and Services League of Australia for over 40 years	
John Cecil Williams	For service to the community, particularly through the Naval Association of Australia	
Robert Ian Wilson	For service to the community and to local government, particularly as mayor of Parkes Shire Council since 1985	
Councillor Keith James Wilson	For service to the community of Whyalla and to local government, particularly as Whyalla City Council mayor, 1970-1973 and again since 1994	
Robert Wilson	For service to the community, particularly through the Australian Services Union since 1969	
Brigadier Colin David Francis Wilson, RFD, ED (Ret'd)	For service to the Australian Light Horse Association	
Herbert George Winders, MBE	For service to the Tweed Heads and district community through the initiation of fundraising projects by the Twin Towns Service Club to assist educational, sporting and community organisations	
Roy Charles Winsted	For service to the community for over 50 years, assisting organisations including the Mount Victoria Fire Brigade, the Queen Victoria Hospital Auxiliary and the Blue Mountains Food Services	
Amy Louise Winters	For service to sport as a gold medallist at the Atlanta Paralympic Games, 1996	
Todd Andrew Woodbridge	For service to sport as gold medallist at the Atlanta Olympic Games, 1996	
Mark Raymond Woodforde	For service to sport as gold medallist at the Atlanta Olympic Games, 1996	
Dorothy Margaret Godwin Woodger	For service to the community in the area of aged care as a volunteer at the Lady Gowrie Nursing Home, Gordon, for over 35 years	
Dr Gwendolyn Marion Woodroofe	For service to women through the ACT Association of the Australian Federation of University Women and UNICEF-ACT	
Philip Greatrex Woods	For service to the community through music for over 50 years, particularly the Wahroonga District Music Club and the Federated Music Clubs of Australia	
Mieczyslaw Zurek	For service to the Polish community through the Polish Sport, Recreation and Community Association	
Ronald Frank Zwar	For service to veterans, particularly through the Ex-Prisoners-of-War Association at State and Federal levels since 1946	

==== Military Division ====
Branch	Recipient	Citation	Notes
Navy	Lieutenant Victor Brian Jeffery	For meritorious service to the RAN in the field of public relations	
Navy	Captain David John Ramsay	For meritorious service to Naval Aviation leading to the formation of Commander Australian Naval Aviation	
Army	Warrant Officer Class One Peter Meredith Allen	For service to the Army, particularly at the Defence Centre Sydney	
Army	Warrant Officer One David Christopher Joseph Dockendor	For service to the Army, particularly the 5th/7th Battalion, Royal Australian Regiment	
Army	Warrant Officer Class One Thomas Law	For meritorious service to the Army and the Royal Australian Corps of Signals, particularly as the Regimental Sergeant Major of the 1st Signal Regiment	
Army	Warrant Officer Class One Joseph Jacques Michael Leckning	For meritorious service to the Army, Air Defence Branch, Royal Regiment of Australian Artillery and particularly as the Regimental Sergeant Major of 16th Air Defence Regiment	
Army	Warrant Officer Class One Stephen Kenneth Prigg	For meritorious service to the Australian Defence Force as Head of Physical Training, Army and Course Implementation Officer for the Defence Force Physical Training School, HMAS Cerberus	
Army	Warrant Officer Class Two Michael James Sugg	For meritorious service to the Army in the field of small arms training and development	
Air Force	Officer Cadet Dean Collins	For service to the Royal Australian Air Force in the field of avionics systems	
Air Force	Squadron Leader John Alexander Macartney	For meritorious service to the C130 Hercules aircraft maintenance in the Royal Australian Air Force	
Air Force	Squadron Leader Brian Charles O'Connell	For meritorious service to the Royal Australian Air Force as officer-in-charge of the pathology section at No 6 RAAF Hospital, Williamstown	
Air Force	Warrant Officer John Robert Wieringa	For meritorious service to the Royal Australian Air Force in the fields of technical and personnel management	
