= Mullinar =

Mullinar is a surname. Notable people with the surname include:

- Liz Mullinar (born 1945), British-Australian casting consultant
- Rod Mullinar (born 1942), Australian actor
