= The ABC of Love and Sex: Australia Style =

1978 film

- Directed by: John D. Lamond
- Written by: John D. Lamond; Alan Finney
- Produced by: John D. Lamond
- Starring: John-Michael Howson
- Narrated by: Sandy Gore; Michael Cole
- Edited by: Russell Hurley
- Production companies: ABC of Love and Sex Film Productions
- Distributed by: Roadshow; Umbrella Entertainment
- Release date: March 1978
- Running time: 85 minutes
- Country: Australia
- Language: English
- Budget: A$70,000
- Box office: A$447,000 (Australia)

The ABC of Love and Sex: Australia Style is a 1978 Australian documentary film that was released on 3 March 1978. The film presents an alphabetical exploration of human sexuality, combining anatomical and reproductive information with discussions of sexual behaviour, relationships and social attitudes. Its treatment is a broadly permissive approach to sexuality, presenting contemporary views on sexual freedom and personal fulfilment alongside more conventional sex education.

== Plot ==
The film opens with giant alphabet blocks, and a general introduction, then begins to move through the alphabet:

- "A" is for ANATOMY - discusses the external and obvious differences between males and females.
- "B" is for BIRTH - also mentions bed and breastfeeding. An interview with Swedish sexologist Maj-Briht Bergström-Walan is shown as well, regarding sex education.
- "C" is for CONTRACEPTION - includes discussion on the rhythm method and use of the pill, alongside diaphragms, IUDs, condoms and spermicidal cream.
- "D" is for DREAMS - Dr Alfred Kinsey is cited, alongside the role of the mind and erotic fantasies (e.g. sex in public places) in sexual fulfilment.
- "E" is for EROTIC - examines forms of erotica, such as films and literature are mentioned, as well as aphrodisiacs, alcohol, sensual massage, and lingerie. E is also for erogenous zones.
- "F" is for FUN - says that sex should be for enjoyment, play, intimacy, and bonding. Other keywords include food and freedom.
- "G" is for GENITALS - explains how size or performance issues are less important than intimacy.
- "H" is for HOMOSEXUAL - discusses how male and female homosexuality is "common" across cultures and races, although attitudes and tolerance levels vary widely.
- "I" is for INNOCENCE (IGNORANCE) - explains how virginity is the start phase for the sexual journey, and also mentions a common sexual double-standard regarding it. The importance of sex education is reintroduced.
- "J" is for JEALOUSY - speaks again of sexual double standards, and shows a "reverse" role-play of two women trying to pick up a man in a pub for a one-night stand.
- "K" is for KISS - discusses the different kinds and functions of kissing, and explains that the mouth is a primary erogenous zone.
- "L" is for LOVE - explains the difference between love-making and love as a feeling, and states the role of individual differences and preferences in creating shared enjoyable intimacy.
- "M" is for MASTURBATION - outlines the history of taboo against it, then states the natural, non-harmful, and beneficial nature of it for both sexes.
- "N" is for NATURAL (NORMAL) - again refers to the individual and cultural perception of what is seen as appropriate or permissive. It then returns to "M", for a vignette on masochism.
- "O" is for ORGASM! - states how this is a central sexual focus, and attention is placed on the need for women to achieve a better "parity" of orgasms too.
- "P" is for PORNOGRAPHY - enters the controversial debate about the effect pornography has in society, but states the lack of evidence of a harmful nature in adult for adult porn.
- "Q" (no vignette)
- "R" is for RAPE - mentions that, despite some male perceptions, rape is not a fantasy women seek or enjoy. The narrator states that it is a shocking crime, and victims need to be both understood and supported.
- "S" is for SEDUCTION - citing Casanova and Don Juan as examples, seduction is another way to keep sex-lives varied and active.
- "T" is for TEMPTATION - explains briefly how sex can be enhanced by allure.
- "U" is for UNDERSTANDING - describes briefly how to be flexible and patient in a loving relationship.
- "V" (no vignette)
- "W" is for WORDS - details how the right words can increase intimacy and bonding.
- "X" is for ExCELLENCE - states how perfection in a relationship is to be strived for, in both a physical and psychological way, within a true loving relationship.
- "Y" is for YOU - as one of the "most important letters", a review montage of previous clips is used to explain the centrality of the individual in sexual decision making.
- "Z" is for ... - the film ends with an animated scene reminding couples to explore, practice, and enjoy their sexuality.

== Production ==
Lamond had intended to follow up his highly successful Australia After Dark (1975) with Felicity, but that was delayed "and I got stuck into doing another cheapie. I knew there was a market for it and, like all of my films, I had a guaranteed release before the film was made." Unlike his first film, this one was shot in 35mm, and around 20% - the hardcore footage - was shot in Sweden. Modelmation Film Productions, based in Melbourne, did the animated closing sequence, and John-Michael Howson starred in the "orgy scene" in the M vignette.

The film encountered troubles with the censor who ended up demanding 3 minutes and 36 seconds be cut from it and stopping him from releasing certain advertisements. Lamond says this hurt his ability to promote the film with adequate lead time. In late 1978, Lamond said the film was in profit "on paper" but he had not received any money yet.

== Cast ==
- Sandy Gore as Narrator
- Brigitta Almström
- Robyn Bartley
- Bettina Borer
- Rose Marie Borg
- Ian Broadbent
- Leon Cosak
- Ian Crow
- Catherine Diós
- Elizabeth Featherstone
- Marie-Louise Fors
- Favio Giovangnoli
- Louise Hemmingway
- John Michael Howson
- Susan Hunter
- Nicholas Kislinsky
- Katie Morgan
- Brigid O'Donoughe
- Marilyn Rodgers
- Kenth Schönning
- Gillian Seamer
- Maud Sundling
- Peter Thompson
- Stephen Walsh

== Reception ==
Scott Murray was typical in his book on Australian Film: "What is notable this film, and others like it, is the joyousness it attributes to free sexuality, in all its forms. Though such films are viewed by many today as sexist and catering solely to male fantasies (a view contradicted by the ticket sales), films like The ABC of Love and Sex Australia Style were important in liberalising community attitudes to sexuality."
