= John D. Lamond =

Australian film director, producer and screenwriter

- Born: 1947; Melbourne, Victoria, Australia
- Died: 24 October 2018 (aged 71); Gold Coast, Queensland, Australia
- Occupations: Film director; producer; screenwriter

John D. Lamond (1947 – 24 October 2018) was an Australian film director, producer and screenwriter. He was best known for directing such films as Felicity, A Slice of Life, Breakfast in Paris and Nightmares.

Before becoming a director he worked in distribution for Roadshow.

He was featured in the documentary Not Quite Hollywood: The Wild, Untold Story of Ozploitation!

== Career ==
=== Early career ===
Lamond began working in the industry at Channel O in Melbourne in the props department. He later became a film editor and worked for several companies, mostly making TV ads at places such as Ajax Studios.

=== Distribution ===
In 1969 he moved into the feature film industry when he was hired by Terry Turtle to help with the roadshow release of This Year Jerusalem. After that he became involved in the release of The Naked Bunyip (1970), showing it around the country, which led to him performing a similar function on The Adventures of Barry McKenzie before Roadshow took over the release of the film.

Turtle then hired Lamond to handle the Australian release of Dynamite Chicken. He designed a poster of a nun in a compromising position which caused a great deal of controversy, earning the ire of then-Minister for Customs, Don Chipp, and got Lamond a job offer from the Roadshow organisation to work in distribution.

Lamond stayed with Roadshow for six months, working on the release of Alvin Purple and a number of other films, then he took a trip around the world with Byron Kennedy looking at various production and distribution set ups.

He produced a short documentary with Kennedy, The Devil in Evening Dress (1974), which was an early directorial effort from George Miller.

=== Australia After Dark and The ABC of Love and Sex ===
He came back keen to make his first film and made the documentary Australia After Dark (1975). The movie was very successful and for the next few years Lamond alternated between making films and working for Roadshow's publicity department, making trailers and radio and TV spots. He would go away for eight weeks to make the movie then promote it while also working at Roadshow. He did this for The ABC of Love and Sex: Australia Style but stopped it in 1977 when it became too time consuming and Lamond became a full-time filmmaker.

=== Feature films ===
Lamond's dramatic feature film debut was Felicity (1979), an erotic - some would say 'sexploitation' flick, that turned out to be popular worldwide. Lamond hoped to make a sequel, but could not raise the requisite financing.

He then did a sex comedy in the vein of the "Carry On" films, Pacific Banana (1980), written by Alan Hopgood. The intention was to launch a series but the film was not a financial success. It was partly funded by the South Australian Film Corporation – who were criticised in Parliament for financing a sexually explicit film.

Lamond moved into slasher films with Nightmare (1980). He made a romantic comedy, Breakfast in Paris (1982), then did another broad comedy with Hopgood, A Slice of Life (1983).

Lamond produced and edited an action adventure film, Sky Pirates (1985). He also helped provide the story for what became the melodrama Backstage (1988).

=== Asia ===
After Sky Pirates, Lamond stopped making movies in Australia and started making them in South East Asia. He later said.

It’s actually a lot of fun making a film overseas if you can get the money together. There’s no Film Commission trying to control your money, you know, if it’s made in Singapore “it has to be Singaporean”. It’s more of the real world... I don’t like unions, and I don’t like to not work on weekends. And I like one day off, but I don’t feel the necessity to finish at 5 or 6 at night. Two days off and have coffee breaks and all that sort of thing.

He produced The Sword of the Bushido (1990) with Richard Norton, wrote and directed North of Chiang Mai (1992) with Sam Bottoms, and True Files (shot in 1997, released in 2002), with Sam Bottoms. He produced Killing Time (24/7) (2006) in Thailand, directed by his son John Lamond Jr.

Lamond was the inspiration for "Warren Perso," a fictional Australian exploitation filmmaker played by Tony Martin in "The Last Aussie Auteur," a sketch in the second season of television's The Late Show. In his podcast series Sizzletown, Martin confirmed the connection between Lamond and Perso.

In 2012, Lamond announced plans to make several movies in Australia. However no films resulted.

Lamond died, aged 71, from Parkinson's disease on 24 October 2018 at a nursing home on the Gold Coast, Queensland.

== Select filmography ==
- Australia After Dark (1975) – writer, producer, director
- The ABC of Love and Sex: Australia Style (1978) – writer, producer, director
- Felicity (1979) – writer, producer, director
- Nightmares (1980) – writer, producer, director
- Pacific Banana (1981) – producer, director
- Breakfast in Paris (1982) – producer, director
- A Slice of Life (1983) – producer, director
- Sky Pirates (1985) – writer, producer
- Backstage (1988) – story
- The Sword of Bushido (1989) – producer
- North of Chiang Mai (1991) – writer, producer, director
- True Files (2002) – writer, producer, director
