= Felicity (film) =

1979 film by John D. Lamond

- Theatrical film poster
- Directed by: John D. Lamond
- Written by: Diane Lamond; John D. Lamond (both as Felicity Robinson)
- Produced by: Russell Hurley; John D. Lamond
- Starring: Glory Annen; Marilyn Rodgers; Joni Flynn; Christopher Milne; Jody Hanson
- Cinematography: Gary Wapscott
- Edited by: Russell Hurley
- Music by: Brian Potter
- Production company: Krystal Motion Picture Productions
- Distributed by: Roadshow; Umbrella Entertainment
- Release date: 5 July 1979
- Running time: 90–94 minutes
- Country: Australia
- Language: English
- Budget: AU$170,000
- Box office: AU$532,000 (Australia)

Felicity is a 1979 Australian sexploitation film starring Canadian actress Glory Annen and written and directed by John D. Lamond.

== Plot ==
Felicity Robinson is a teenager who studies at a remote Roman Catholic Church boarding school and who seeks indulgence in the popular erotic novels Story of O and Emmanuelle, and in a lesbian love affair with her friend Jenny. Her father arranges her holiday trip to Hong Kong where she will stay with a wealthy couple, Christine and Stephen. Christine organises a party to introduce Felicity to a friend of theirs, Andrew. After the party at the couple's mansion, Andrew takes Felicity for a ride in his car during which he pulls over and deflowers her. Christine also introduces her to libertine Me Ling. Me Ling initiates Felicity to new pleasures. However, Felicity eventually falls in love with Miles who saves her from a bunch of Chinese thugs.

== Cast ==
- Glory Annen as Felicity Robinson
- Chris Milne as Miles
- Joni Flynn as Me Ling
- Jody Hanson as Jenny
- Marilyn Rodgers as Christine
- Gordon Charles as Stephen
- John Michael Howson as Adrian, lingerie salesman
- David Bradshaw as Andrew
- Christine Calcutt as nun
- John D. Lamond as peeping tom gardener / man in cinema

== Production ==
Lamond wanted to make a film in the vein of those directed by Just Jaeckin such as Emmanuelle:

The French have always been able to make their films NOT be pornographic, they’d be erotic. They were classy – the most they could ever say was 'softcore'. And the way they did it, they made pretty images that looked like a Singapore Airlines TV commercial, they had nice fashion, good photography and nice music. And that way it dresses it up and makes it all chocolate boxy... I thought okay, the way to do that on a film budget is to go somewhere exotic. Make sure the people are pretty and they don’t have pimples. Don’t be sordid in any way, have pretty music and exotic locations, nice lighting and nice fashion. So even though it was a tiny film, we came up to Hong Kong and we got all the clothes tailor made for them, so that they fitted properly.

Lamond was also influenced by The World of Suzie Wong (1960), which prompted him to set it in Hong Kong. He intended to make it immediately after Australia After Dark but ended up making The ABC of Love and Sex: Australia Style first. Lamond claims that at one stage George Miller was going to direct but he wanted to take the film in a different direction.

Lamond secured investment from Roadshow Pictures, then tried to obtain funding from the government film bodies. They refused, although the AFC offered to loan him $40,000, but Lamond did not want to be beholden to them. He formed a unit trust and sold a hundred units at $1,250 each which people could buy in any number, and the movie was made entirely with private funds.

Glory Annen was a Canadian actress living in London who was cast in the lead role.

The film was shot in 1977. The Internet Movie Database cites the opening scenes as having been shot at Montsalvat, Eltham, while the train station scene was at Healesville. Other scenes were filmed in Hong Kong and in a studio at Nunawading in Melbourne; when a typhoon was approaching Hong Kong Lamond moved the unit to Lord Howe Island instead for a number of days. Lamond says it was shot in the same "Singapore Airlines style" as Emmanuelle, "No. 3 fog filters and so on. It gives the film a nice, respectable look.

In one scene the characters go to a movie where The ABC of Love and Sex: Australia Style is being shown. Lamond describes this as a "pure Roger Corman-style economic necessity."

== Box office ==
Felicity grossed $532,000 at the box office in Australia, perhaps $5,000,000 in 2020 dollars. According to Lamond it also sold widely around the world.

== Cancelled sequel ==
Lamond intended to make a sequel, Felicity in the Garden of Pleasures. It was budgeted at $230,000 and the South Australian Film Corporation decided to invest A$100,000. The corporation's director, John Morris, told the board "the film would be funny, commercial and R-rated". However the decision was much criticised and the SAFC withdrew their investment. No sequel was made.

== Edits ==
- In the UK, the British Board of Film Classification (BBFC) has classified three versions of the film: in 1979, the film was released for cinema with an "X" certificate, precursor of the "18" certificate, after unspecified cuts had been made; in 1991, it was passed uncut for video with an "18" certificate; in 2008, Severin Films released an uncensored Director's cut of the film on DVD. It was passed uncut with an "18" certificate.
- Prior to the Video Recordings Act 1984, the film was available uncertified on VHS video cassette.
- In 2004, Obsession Entertainment of North America issued a DVD in the NTSC format. The running time is quoted as 91 minutes. The star, Glory Annen, is not credited on the DVD cover. The UPC is 0-19485-05333-3.
- (Date Unknown) Fejui Media Corporation of Taiwan issued a DVD in the NTSC format. The running time is quoted as 90 minutes. The UPC is 4–716354–372439.
- In New Zealand, the film is rated R18 for explicit sex scenes.

== See also ==
- Cinema of Australia
