= Robotron Group =

Australian high technology company

Robotron Pty. Ltd.
- Company type: Private
- Industry: Electronics
- Genre: Technology
- Founded: 1983
- Founder: Milan Hudecek
- Headquarters: Melbourne, Australia
- Area served: Worldwide
- Products: Specialty Consumer and Professional Equipment
- Website: robogroup.com

Robotron Pty. Ltd. is an Australian research & development and manufacturing company of various specialty high-technology equipment. The company was founded in 1983 by Czech-born engineer Milan Hudecek. Its products include assistive technology equipment for the blind, such as reading machines, navigational and word-processing tools.

Hudecek's inspirational meetings with executives of various blind support and consumer organizations, discussing development of the Robotron equipment, for example, the Eureka A4 computers are described in various sources such as The Braille Monitor. The company also pioneered the development of speech synthesis products for non-European languages, for example Thai language 'Aria' computer.

The Robotron Rainbow and TR320 are reading machines for the blind.

In 1989, the company won the Australian Export Award.

In 1990, the company was awarded the annual Canadian Winston Gordon Award of Excellence in Accessible Technology in the field of blindness and visual impairment for their Eureka A4 device. The award "recognizes an individual or group who has made significant technological advances benefiting people with sight loss." The Eureka A4 attached to an early 1990s PC "to utilise screen orientated programs. It had sockets for telephone lines, a Braille keyboard, an inbuilt disk drive, speed and volume controls as well as outlets for data ports and headphones."

Stevie Wonder and Ray Charles both used Robotron equipment.

In 1991 the company founded a subsidiary called Rosetta Laboratories Pty. Ltd. (later renamed to Radixon Group Pty. Ltd.) to concentrate on development and marketing of specialty PC peripherals. One of its first products was the WiNRADiO PC card which provided the initial impetus for the development of the entire WiNRADiO range of PC-based radio receivers and accessories.
