= Rod Mullinar =

Australian actor

- Born: 1941 (age 84–85); Hereford, UK
- Occupation: Actor
- Years active: 1964-2020
- Known for: Hunter; Ryan
- Height: 1.87 m (6 ft 1 1/2 in)
- Spouse(s): Liz Mullinar (approx. 2 yrs); Penny Ramsey-Mullinar (dec. 2009)

Rodney Mullinar (born 1941) is a British Australian former actor, noted for his roles on Australian television.

== Early life ==
Mullinar was born in Hereford, Herefordshire, England in 1941 and emigrated to Australia in 1966, at the urging of an Australian friend in London, actor Bill Hunter. He relocated to Sydney with his first wife actress Liz Mullinar who was at that time also an actor but would soon become a well-known casting agent.

== Career ==
Mullinar appeared in theatre productions, firstly with the Australian Theatre for Young People and then with the Independent Theatre troupe in mid-1968 with whom he performed in the plays Wait Until Dark, Uncle Vanya, and Tango. He also had a major role in the controversial 1970 film The Set in which he plays Tony Brown, who has an affair with the film's protagonist, Paul, played by Sean McEuan. During the making of The Set, Mullinar, who was union shop steward for the film, was punched by another actor when Mullinar demanded to see his union card. The Sydney Morning Herald identified this actor as the female impersonator 'Kandy' Johnson, who was not a union member.

Mullinar took the leading role in Australian espionage drama Hunter late in the show's run in 1968, however he appeared in just eight episodes due to the cancellation of the series. He subsequently played the title role in television series Ryan (1973).

An article in the Sydney Morning Herald in 1969 claimed that, before migrating to Australia, Mullinar had a small role in the 1965 James Bond film Thunderball as well as appearing in the British TV series Z Cars and No Hiding Place. An article in the Melbourne Age in June 1972 also claimed that Mullinar was a graduate of London's Royal Academy of Dramatic Art and had appeared in the film Wake in Fright, the aforementioned Z Cars and Thunderball as well as Softly, Softly: Task Force (as this show began in 1969, this seems unlikely, but he may have been involved in its predecessor, Softly, Softly). It stated that Mullinar had been shortlisted for the role of Frank Banner in Division 4, which was ultimately given to Gerard Kennedy.

Mullinar's other credits include: Cop Shop, Bellbird, Homicide, Division 4, Matlock Police, Against the Wind, Breaker Morant, Prisoner, Five Mile Creek, All Saints, Stingers, Joanne Lees: Murder in the Outback, Reef Doctors, The Lost World, and The Doctor Blake Mysteries.

== Personal life ==
Mullinar's second wife was actress Penny Ramsey. During publicity for Ryan, Mullinar and Ramsey chose to make their relationship public - they had a young daughter at this stage but were not yet married - under threat of exposure by persons unspecified.

== Filmography ==
=== Film ===
Rod Mullinar film credits
Year	Title	Role	Ref.
1969	It Takes All Kinds	Policeman	
1970	The Set	Tony Brown	
1971	Stockade	Peter Lalor	
1974	The Wanderer	Unknown	
1975	Down the Wind	Reg	
1977	Raw Deal	Alex	
1978	The Pyjama Girl Case	Inspector Morris	
1978	Patrick	Ed Jacquard	
1979	Thirst	Derek	
1980	Breaker Morant	Major Charles Bolton	
1980	...Maybe This Time	Jack	
1981	The Coming	Unknown	
1982	Duet for Four	Ken Overland	
1982	Breakfast in Paris	Michaels Barnes	
1983	Now and Forever	Geoffrey Bates	
1987	The Surfer	Hagan	
1987	Echoes of Paradise	Terry	
1989	Dead Calm	Russell Bellows	
1989	The Humpty Dumpty Man	Stewart Brax	
2000	Muggers	Marcus Browning	
2013	Patrick	Morris	
2017	That's Not Me	Summer Street "Len"	

=== Television ===
Rod Mullinar television credits
Year	Title	Role	Notes	Ref.
Unknown	The Adventurers	Unknown		
1967	Contrabandits	Unknown	1 episode	
1967–1974	Homicide	(various)	8 episodes	
1968–1969	Hunter	Gil Martin / Ted Cook	11 episodes	
1969–1972	Division 4	Tony Todd / Ronny Raynor / Roger Downey / Brian Beetson / Tom Evans	5 episodes	
1971	Dynasty	Bob Campbell	1 episode	
1971–1972	Matlock Police	Jack Bowan / Lou Carter / Ward	3 episodes	
1972	Over There	Tom Bowden	1 episode	
1972	Boney	Frank Abbott	1 episode	
1973–1974	Ryan	Michael Ryan	Regular role	
1974	Rush	Jim Hill	1 episode	
1974–1975	Bellbird	Scott Leighton	Regular role	
1975	Quality of Mercy	Charlie	1 episode	
1977	Beyond Reasonable Doubt	Prosecutor	TV miniseries	
1977	Young Ramsay	George	1 episode	
1977	Bluey	Swanson	1 episode	
1978	The Geeks	Martin	TV movie	
1978	Run From the Morning	Spencer	6 episodes	
1978	Against the Wind	John MacCarthur	TV miniseries	
1978	Magee and the Lady	Tom	TV movie	
1978–1980	Cop Shop	Loan Shark / Rod Eastwood / Mitch Mitchell / Hal Kennedy / Patrick McCallum	13 episodes	
1979	Skyways	Geoff Blake	3 episodes	
1979	The Sullivans	Uncle Alf Donovan	Regular role	
1979	Taxi	Leslie Armitage	TV movie	
1979–1980	Prisoner	David Austin / Wayne Travers	12 episodes	
1980	Water Under the Bridge	Don Brandywine	TV miniseries	
1983	For the Term of His Natural Life	Lt. Maurice Frere	TV miniseries	
1983–1985	Five Mile Creek	Jack Taylor	Regular role	
1984	Eureka Stockade	Frederick Vern	TV miniseries	
1986	The Flying Doctors	Darcy Adams	1 episode	
1987	Walter Dixon's Wombat	Johnathon	TV movie	
1988	Rafferty's Rules	Harry Bertie	1 episode	
1989	Inside Running	Unknown		
1989	Mission: Impossible	Conrad Drago	2 episodes	
1989	The Magistrate	Ian Walters	TV miniseries	
1992	Boney	Selby	1 episode	
1992	The Fremantle Conspiracy	Unknown	TV miniseries	
1992	Cluedo	Frederick Stokes	1 episode	
1994	Newlyweds	Kirby Hacker	2 episodes	
1994	Halifax F.P.	Melvin Lazar	1 episode	
1997	Simone de Beauvoir's Babies	Mick	TV miniseries	
1998	All Saints	Professor Richard Craig	10 episodes	
1999, 2002	The Lost World	Bokra / Kayle/Zoth	2 episodes	
2000	Tales of the South Seas	Unknown	TV miniseries. Episode: "Blackbirding"	
2000	Shortland Street	Max Dubrovsky	2 episodes	
2000	On the Beach	Admiral Jack Cunnington	TV movie	
2001	Shock Jock	Basil Hannigan	13 episodes	
2001	BeastMaster	Chiuma	Episode: "The Prize"	
2001	Curse of the Talisman	Father Eccleston	TV movie	
2002	MDA	Dr. Nathan Tate	1 episode	
2003	Welcher & Welcher	Toby	TV miniseries	
2004	Stories from the Golf	Richard	1 episode	
2004	Stingers	Colin Burns	1 episode	
2007	Joanne Lees: Murder in the Outback	Judge	TV movie	
2007	City Homicide	Olivier Braxton	1 episode	
2007–2011	Dogstar	Chester (voice)	4 episodes	
2008	Very Small Business	Dick Denyer	2 episodes	
2008–2009	Satisfaction	Jimmy Buraston	3 episodes	
2009	Rush	Gavin	1 episode	
2011	Killing Time	Judge Hart	TV miniseries	
2012	Lowdown	Additional voices	1 episode	
2013	Reef Doctors	Sonny Ferrall	TV miniseries	
2014	The Flamin' Thongs	King Rerpsies	1 episode	
2015	The Doctor Blake Mysteries	Jock Clement	1 episode	
2015	Miss Fisher's Murder Mysteries	Wilbur Littleton	1 episode	
2016	Comedy Showroom: Bleak	'Gates of Hell' Narrator (voice)	TV movie	
2016	Dogstar: Christmas in Space	Commercial announcer	TV movie	
2017	House Husbands	William Mitchell	1 episode	
2017	Impossible Peace	Narrator		
2018–2019	True Story with Hamish & Andy	Narrator	Regular role	
2019	Utopia	Sunlink VO / Voice-Over	2 episodes	
2019	Secret Bridesmaids' Business	Dyson Novak	1 episode	
2019–2020	Bloom	Tommy Brydon	7 episodes	
