= Ken Goodwin (academic) =

Australian academic and author

Ken Leslie Goodwin (29 September 1934 – 12 July 2014) was an Australian academic and author.

Ken Goodwin was the first of his family to attend university. After obtaining a BA Hons. and a Dip. Ed. from the University of Sydney he taught at a New South Wales high school and Wagga Wagga Teachers' College. In 1959 he accepted a position as a lecturer in English in the Department of External Studies at The University of Queensland.

In the 1997 Australia Day Honours Goodwin was made a Member of the Order of Australia in recognition of his service to literature, art administration and education.

== Publications ==
His publications include:

- A history of Australian literature London : Macmillan, 1986.
- The Influence of Ezra Pound: Oxford University Press, 1966.
