= Breakfast in Paris =

- Film poster
- Directed by: John D. Lamond
- Written by: Morris Dalton
- Produced by: John D. Lamond
- Starring: Barbara Parkins; Rod Mullinar
- Production company: Breakfast in Paris Ltd
- Distributed by: Roadshow
- Release date: 1982
- Country: Australia
- Language: English
- Budget: $1 million
- Box office: A$42,000 (Australia)

Breakfast in Paris is a 1982 Australian romantic comedy.

== Plot ==
Fashion executive Jackie Wyatt discovers her boyfriend has been cheating on her. She flies to Paris and bumps into photographer Michael who she at first dislikes but grows to love.

== Cast ==
- Barbara Parkins as Jackie Wyatt
- Rod Mullinar as Michael Barnes
- Elspeth Ballantyne as Millie
- Christopher Milne as Craig

== Production ==
The film was shot in Melbourne and Paris. Parkins agreed to star in the film after Lamond showed her a clip of Rod Mullinar in Breaker Morant.

"It's an unashamedly lyrical love story, complete with a sentimental soundtrack by a 42-piece orchestra," said Lamond.
