= Hayes Gordon =

American-Australian actor

Hayes Gordon AO OBE
- Born: 25 February 1920; Boston, Massachusetts, United States
- Died: 19 October 1999 (aged 79); Sydney, Australia
- Occupations: Theatre actor, producer, and director; film actor; singer; drama teacher
- Spouse(s): Katrina Van Oss (div.); Helen Terry

Hayes Gordon (25 February 1920 – 19 October 1999) was an American-born actor, theatre entrepreneur, producer and director and acting teacher with a considerable career in Australia.

== Early life ==
Gordon was born on 25 February 1920, in Boston, Massachusetts growing up in the tenements there during the 1930s Depression.

An only child, Gordon helped support his parents financially by teaching at Peabody House, an organisation set up to provide education to poor children and keep them off the streets and out of trouble.

While at high school, Gordon performed in his first stage roles in amateur Gilbert and Sullivan productions. After he left high school, Gordon studied pharmacy, while performing variety broadcasts. At the age of 20, he presented his own weekly television series, Hayes Gordon Presents. He also entertained guests at a hotel in New Hampshire.

Gordon graduated from university with a Bachelor of Science, after which he went on to work as a control chemist at a food company in New York, and then on to a pharmacy. One day, a customer told him about an audition for a bass baritone. He soon went to work in the theatre and also undertook voice training.

== Career ==
=== United States ===
In 1942, Gordon joined chorus of the Paper Mill Playhouse in New Jersey, performing in vintage musicals, the first being the operetta Naughty Marietta. After a subsequent performance in The Desert Song, Gordon met its lyricist, Oscar Hammerstein, resulting in a small part in the 1943 premiere of Rodgers and Hammerstein's Oklahoma!

A few months later, in 1943 Gordon was drafted into the army. His first service assignment was Moss Hart's musical play Winged Victory, which toured nationally. He then set up a theatre education program for the company, while studying acting under Sanford Meisner at the Neighbourhood Playhouse.

Gordon continued to appear on Broadway in several musicals, including a 1946 revival of Show Boat, Brigadoon, Sleepy Hollow and the revues Small Wonder and Along Fifth Avenue. While working on Brigadoon, Gordon began taking acting lessons from Lee Strasberg, the pioneer of method acting. He also appeared in America's first television soap opera Fashion Story, had a radio show called 'Music in the Air', and worked in nightclubs.

In 1951, Gordon got caught up in Joe McCarthy's campaign, where member of the theatre industry were being scrutinised and named in 'Red Networks', a newsletter which specialised in naming alleged communists and sympathisers. After he refused to sign a loyalty oath declaring that he was not a communist, acting work dried up completely.

=== Australia ===
In 1952, Gordon traveled to Australia to star in J. C. Williamson's musical Kiss Me, Kate, until 1953. Upon finding out that Gordon had studied with Strasberg, fellow cast member Maggie Fitzgibbon convinced him to give some informal acting lessons. When the tour ended in 1953, Hayes remained in Australia to appear in other productions, including J. C. Williamson's Annie Get Your Gun and Oklahoma!. He also compered the long-running Ford Show variety radio series. From 1955, he played Hajj in Garnet H. Carroll's staging of Kismet, presented the original Late Show television series, and created the afternoon ‘advice’ series, Medico.

During this time, Gordon was asked to continue teaching J. C. Williamson's company members Strasberg's technique, ‘The Method’, which was based on the teachings of Stanislavsky. He also occasionally taught acting at Doris Fitton's Independent Theatre. Among Gordon's regular students was Lorraine Bayly. After studying with him for 18 months, Bayly and Gordon formed an acting troupe, together with several other students. Their first performance – a series of short plays by Tennessee Williams, was staged at Cammeray Children’s Library in 1958. Following the performance, they adopted the name 'Ensemble Theatre Company', on the premise that there would be no 'stars' of the troupe, only the ensemble. Gordon served as artistic director. The company included Reg Livermore, Jon Ewing and Clarissa Kaye, among others and took up residence above a cake shop in North Sydney.

After selling out shows, Gordon relocated the company to a derelict warehouse in Sydney's Kirribilli, which was purchased via fundraising and renovated via voluntary labour from the actors, cleaning bricks and laying down the bitumen and dyeing hessian sacks, while Gordon worked on the lighting system. The resulting Ensemble Theatre (Sydney’s first theatre-in-the round) opened in 1960, with a production of Mel Dinelli's The Man, starring Jon Ewing in the title role.

Productions of Orpheus Descending and The Drunkard followed, as did Australian plays. Gordon directed most of the company’s productions, while running the Ensemble’s drama school. Poetry readings, school presentations and film screenings were also held at the venue.

From 1966, Gordon directed a series of classic American musicals at Sydney's Menzies Hotel, including Oklahoma!, Kiss Me, Kate, Out of this World, Can-Can, Wonderful Town, Brigadoon and South Pacific. Performers included the likes of Lorrae Desmond, Judi Farr, Nancye Hayes, Rosina Raisbeck, Reg Evans and Denis Quilley.

In 1967, J. C. Williamson's persuaded Gordon to return to acting as Tevye in Fiddler on the Roof at Her Majesty's Theatre, Sydney. He stayed with the show for its three-year run and it became the most acclaimed role of his Australian career. After this, he performed in a 200th anniversary re-enactment of the landing of Captain Cook at Botany Bay, an event that was ultimately sabotaged by protesters.

In 1971, Gordon directed Who Killed Santa Claus? for Williamson’s, and in 1973 he directed The Royal Hunt of the Sun for the Christchurch Arts Festival. That same year, Ensemble’s drama school transferred to Pitt Street, followed by the Independent Theatre in North Sydney.

In 1977, Gordon published "Toward an Ethical Theatre". The following year, he returned to the stage to play Daddy Warbucks with the original Australian cast of Annie, in a touring production with J. C. Williamson's.

In 1983, Ensemble Theatre temporarily moved to the Sydney Opera House while a new larger theatre was built in Kirribilli. It opened in 1984 with a staging of The Prisoner of Second Avenue.

Gordon reprised his role as Tevye in a successful 1985/1986 revival of Fiddler on the Roof, for the Australian Opera. He handed over his role as Artistic Director of Ensemble Theatre to Sandra Bates in 1986.

Gordon’s final stage appearance was in Broadway Bound for Gary Penny Productions at the Sydney Opera House in 1988, while his last directorial credit was Jake's Women in 1993.

In 1992, Gordon published "A Compleat Compendium of Acting and Performing, in Two Parts", which outlined his Stanislavsky-influenced acting methods.

== Honours ==
- 1997: Officer of the Order of Australia (AO) in the Australia Day Honours, "In recognition of service to the arts, particularly the acting profession and the theatre and to the community"
- 1979: Officer of the Order of the British Empire (OBE) in the New Year's Honours, "In recognition of service to the performing arts".
- 1979: Honoured with a tribute on an episode of This is Your Life.
- 1999: Glugs Theatrical Awards named one of their awards the 'Hayes Gordon Memorial Award for Important Contribution to Theatre'.

== Personal life ==
Gordon married and divorced American music theatre performer Katrina Van Oss in the U.S. In 1972 he married former student Helen Terry, and had one daughter.

Gordon was a great friend and mentor to Australian actress Denise Roberts, who taught film and television at the Ensemble Studios for Hayes for over six years. In September 2000, Roberts established Screenwise, a Sydney-based film and television school for actors, where she began teaching the Hayes Gordon philosophy for screen acting.

== Death ==
Gordon died on 19 October 1999 in Sydney, at the age of 79. He was survived by his wife and daughter.

== Theatre ==
=== As actor ===
Year	Title	Role	Venue / Co.	Ref.
c.1942	Naughty Marietta		Paper Mill Playhouse, New Jersey	
c.1942	The Desert Song		Paper Mill Playhouse, New Jersey	
1943–1944	Winged Victory	Gordon Williams / Ensemble / Choral Group	44th Street Theatre, New York	
1943–1948	Oklahoma!	Sam / Singing Ensemble	St. James Theatre, New York	
1946–1947	Show Boat	Barker / Singer	Ziegfeld Theatre, New York	
1947–1948	Brigadoon	Singer / Sandy Dean	Ziegfeld Theatre, New York	
1948	Sleepy Hollow	Brom 'Bones' Van Brunt	St. James Theatre, New York	
1948–1949	Small Wonder	Clint La Rue / The Groom	Coronet Theatre, New York	
1949	Along Fifth Avenue	Ensemble / Singer / First Couple / Chris	Broadhurst Theatre, New York, Imperial Theatre, New York	
1952–1954	Kiss Me, Kate	Petruchio / Fred Graham	Australian tour with J. C. Williamson's	
1952–1953	Annie Get Your Gun	Frank Butler	Australian tour with J. C. Williamson's	
1953	Oklahoma!	Curly	His Majesty's Theatre, Perth with J. C. Williamson's	
1955–1956	Kismet	Hajj	Princess Theatre, Melbourne, Empire Theatre, Sydney with Garnet H. Carroll / J. C. Williamson's	
1967–1970	Fiddler on the Roof	Tevye	Australia & New Zealand tour with J. C. Williamson's	
1968	A Thousand and One Stars		Her Majesty's Theatre, Melbourne	
1978	Voice Prints		Ensemble Theatre, Sydney with The Saturday Centre	
1978–1980	Annie	Daddy Warbucks	Australian tour with J. C. Williamson's	
1984–1985	Fiddler on the Roof	Tevye	Australian tour with Australian Opera	
1986	Mavra / Hinund Zuruck / Il Prigioniero	Guest 16/4 with Myer Friedman	Opera Centre, Sydney with Opera Mode	
1988	Broadway Bound	Grandfather Ben	Sydney Opera House with Gary Penny Productions	

=== As director ===
Year	Title	Role	Venue / Co.	Ref.
1958	Variations on Similar Themes	Director	Cammeray Children's Library, Theatre Institute, Sydney with Ensemble Theatre	
1958–1960	The Man	Director	Theatre Institute, Sydney, Ensemble Theatre, Sydney	
1959–1960	Orpheus Descending	Director	Ensemble Theatre, Sydney	
1960	The Drunkard	Director	Ensemble Theatre, Sydney	
1961	Miss Lonelyhearts	Director	Ensemble Theatre, Sydney	
1961	The Seven Year Itch	Director	Ensemble Theatre, Sydney	
1961	The Buffalo Skinner	Director	Ensemble Theatre, Sydney	
1962	Five Finger Exercise	Director	Ensemble Theatre, Sydney	
1962	Billy Liar	Director	Ensemble Theatre, Sydney	
1963	Look Homeward, Angel	Director	Ensemble Theatre, Sydney	
1963	Between Two Thieves	Director	Ensemble Theatre, Sydney	
1963	Fairy Tales of New York	Director	Ensemble Theatre, Sydney	
1963	The Tiger / The Typists	Director	Ensemble Theatre, Sydney	
1963	The Physicists	Director	Ensemble Theatre, Sydney	
1964	The Thracian Horses	Director	Ensemble Theatre, Sydney	
1964	The Rehearsal	Director	Ensemble Theatre, Sydney	
1964	Cages: Snowangel / Epiphany	Director	Ensemble Theatre, Sydney	
1965	Invitation to a March	Director	Ensemble Theatre, Sydney	
1965	Baby Want a Kiss	Director	Ensemble Theatre, Sydney	
1965	Photo Finish	Director	Ensemble Theatre, Sydney	
1965	The Subject Was Roses	Director	Ensemble Theatre, Sydney	
1965	Semi-Detached	Director	Peninsula Playhouse, Sydney with Ensemble Theatre	
1966	Oklahoma!	Director	Menzies Hotel, Sydney	
1966	Brigadoon	Director	Menzies Hotel, Sydney	
1966	Burning Bright	Director	Ensemble Theatre, Sydney	
1966–1967	Where's Daddy?	Director	Ensemble Theatre, Sydney	
1967	Kiss Me, Kate	Director	Menzies Hotel, Sydney	
1967	Out of this World	Director	Menzies Hotel, Sydney	
1967	Can-Can	Director	Menzies Hotel, Sydney	
1967	Wonderful Town	Director	Menzies Hotel, Sydney	
1967	South Pacific	Director	Menzies Hotel, Sydney	
1967	The Owl and the Pussycat	Director	Ensemble Theatre, Sydney & NSW tour with Union Theatre Repertory Company	
1967	Slow Dance on the Killing Ground	Director	Ensemble Theatre, Sydney	
1967	All Things Bright and Beautiful	Director	Ensemble Theatre, Sydney	
1968	An Enemy of the People	Director	Ensemble Theatre, Sydney	
1969	The Real Inspector Hound	Director	Ensemble Theatre, Sydney	
1969	Postscript to a Promise	Director	Ensemble Theatre, Sydney	
1970	Re-Enactment of Cook's Landing at Kurnell	Director	Sydney	
1970	We Bombed in New Haven	Director	Ensemble Theatre, Sydney, Monash University, Melbourne, Playhouse, Canberra	
1971	Who Killed Santa Claus?	Director	Comedy Theatre, Melbourne, Phillip Theatre, Sydney with J. C. Williamson's	
1971	The Effect of Gamma Rays on Man-in-the-Moon Marigolds	Director	Ensemble Theatre, Sydney	
1971	Luther	Producer	Ensemble Theatre, Sydney	
1972	Same Difference	Director	Australian tour with Ensemble Theatre	
1972	Enter a Free Man	Director	Ensemble Theatre, Sydney	
1972	Summertree	Director	Ensemble Theatre, Sydney	
1973	The Royal Hunt of the Sun	Director	James Hay Theatre, Christchurch fir Christchurch Arts Festival	
1973	The Gingerbread Lady	Director	Ensemble Theatre, Sydney	
1974	Who's Who	Director	Ensemble Theatre, Sydney, Theatre 62, Adelaide	
1974	The Gentle Island	Director	Ensemble Theatre, Sydney	
1974	6 Rms Riv Vu	Director	Ensemble Theatre, Sydney	
1974–1975	Savages	Director	Ensemble Theatre, Sydney, Theatre Royal, Hobart	
1975	The Good Doctor	Director	Ensemble Theatre, Sydney, Playhouse, Canberra, Monash University, Melbourne	
1976	Comedians	Director	Ensemble Theatre, Sydney	
1976	California Suite	Director	Ensemble Theatre, Sydney	
1977	Medal of Honor Rag	Director	Ensemble Theatre, Sydney	
1977	Boy Meets Girl	Director	Ensemble Theatre, Sydney	
1977	A Marriage	Director	Ensemble Theatre, Sydney	
1977	The Prisoner of Second Avenue	Director	Ensemble Theatre, Sydney	
1978	Lamb of God	Director	Ensemble Theatre, Sydney	
1979	Chapter Two	Director	Ensemble Theatre, Sydney	
1980	No Room for Dreamers	Assistant Producer / Production Assistant / Lighting Designer	Ensemble Theatre, Sydney & UK tour	
1980	Cold Storage	Director	Ensemble Theatre, Sydney, National Theatre, Melbourne	
1980	Happy Family	Lighting Designer	Ensemble Theatre, Sydney	
1981	When in Rome	Director	Ensemble Theatre, Sydney	
1981	I Ought to Be in Pictures	Director / Lighting Designer	Ensemble Theatre, Sydney, Universal Theatre, Melbourne, Playhouse, Canberra	
1981	The Elephant Man	Director	Ensemble Theatre, Sydney	
1982	Old World	Director	Ensemble Theatre, Sydney	
1982	The Price	Director	Ensemble Theatre, Sydney	
1982; 1984	Mass Appeal	Director	Australian tour with Ensemble Theatre	
1983	Veronica's Room	Director	Ensemble Theatre, Sydney	
1983	All My Sons	Director	Sydney Opera House with Ensemble Theatre	
1984	Filumena	Director	Sydney Opera House with Ensemble Theatre	
1985	Tosca		Festival Theatre, Adelaide	
1985	Play Memory	Director	Ensemble Theatre, Sydney	
1985	Same Time, Next Year	Director	Ensemble Theatre, Sydney	
1986	Mavra / Hinund Zuruck / Il Prigioniero	Convenor	Opera Centre, Sydney with Opera Mode	
1986–1987	Barefoot in the Park	Director	Ensemble Theatre, Sydney	
1987	The Gingerbread Lady	Director	Theatre Royal, Hobart, Ensemble Theatre, Universal Theatre, Melbourne	
1989	The Star-Spangled Girl	Director	Ensemble Theatre, Sydney	
1993	Jake's Women	Director	Ensemble Theatre, Sydney	

== Filmography ==
=== Film ===
Year	Title	Role	Venue / Co.
1944	Hollywood Canteen	Serviceman (uncredited)	Feature film
1965	Revenge of a Shark Victim	Narrator	Short film
1975	Australia After Dark	Narrator	Documentary film
1982	The Dark Room	Self	Feature film
1983	The Return of Captain Invincible	Kirby	Feature film
1983	Abra Cadabra	B.L. Z'Bubb	Animated film
1986	Sky Pirates	Narrator	Feature film

=== Television ===
Year	Title	Role	Venue / Co.	Ref.
c.1940	Hayes Gordon Presents	Presenter		
1948	The Fashion Story		2 episodes	
1949	The Fifty-Fourth Street Revue	Self	2 episodes	
1957	The Late Show	Presenter		
1957	The George Wallace Show	Self	TV special	
1960	Design 218		TV documentary film	
1979	This Is Your Life	Self	1 episode	

== Radio ==
Year	Title	Role	Venue / Co.	Ref.
1940s	Music in the Air		Radio show, New York	
1956–1957	Ford Show	Compere	Radio series	

== Bibliography ==
Year	Title	Role	Ref.
1977	"Toward an Ethical Theatre"	Author	
1992	"A Compleat Compendium of Acting and Performing, in Two Parts"	Author	
