= Winradio =

WiNRADiO Communications
- Type: Private
- Industry: Communications
- Genre: Technology
- Founded: 1991
- Founder: Milan Hudecek
- Headquarters: Melbourne, Australia
- Area served: Worldwide
- Products: Radio communications products
- Website: winradio.com

Winradio (stylized WiNRADiO) is the brand name for the radio communication equipment and the name of the commercial division of Radixon Group in Melbourne, Australia, a subsidiary of Robotron Group. It includes computer-based radio receivers, software, antennas and accessories for software-defined radio.

This trading name was adopted as a result of market success of the company's first product, the "WinRadio Card". This was an ISA bus card which transformed a Windows-based computer into a wide-coverage communications receiver, making it possible to receive point-to-point communications (ham radio, utilities, police, space research, etc.) on an ordinary personal computer.

The company also acts as official distributor of the DRM (Digital Radio Mondiale) demodulator/decoder software, a result of the collaborative project between VT Merlin Communications, Fraunhofer Institute Integrierte Schaltungen (Integrated Circuits) and Coding Technologies.

Apart from general-purpose radio, some unusual applications of WiNRADiO receivers have been reported, such as in radio astronomy or search for extraterrestrial intelligence. The Adelaide Hills Radio Telescope (radio astronomy) uses WiNRADiO equipment and software .

WiNRADiO receivers are also reportedly applied in audio engineering for stage performances, in particular for spectrum analysis of wireless microphones.

Despite the Windows-affiliation implied by the name, the WiNRADiO receivers are also available for Macintosh. A set of Linux development tools for most WiNRADiO models ("LinRadio"), has also been developed and is available at www.linradio.com.
