= Down the Wind =

- Directed by: Scott Hicks; Kim McKenzie
- Written by: Kim McKenzie
- Produced by: Scott Hicks
- Starring: David Cameron; Penne Hackforth-Jones
- Cinematography: Gus Howard
- Edited by: Kim McKenzie
- Production company: Chrysalis Films
- Release date: 28 August 1975
- Running time: 64 minutes
- Country: Australia
- Language: English
- Budget: AU$22,000

Down the Wind is a 1975 Australian film which marked the directorial debut of Scott Hicks. He made it shortly after graduating from university.

== Plot ==
Photographer Simon Jess is given an assignment to shoot backgrounds in the Snowy Mountains.

== Cast ==
- David Cameron as Simon Jess
- Penne Hackforth-Jones as Sara
- Ross Thompson as Tom
- Christina Mackay as Tina
- Rod Mullinar as Reg

== Production ==
The film was the second of two joint projects between Hicks and Kim McKenzie. They had previously made The Wanderer (1974) together.

The budget was mostly provided by the Film, Television and Radio Board of the Australian Council.

== Release ==
Screenings of the film were minimal.
