= Water Under the Bridge (miniseries) =

- DVD cover
- Genre: mini-series
- Written by: Eleanor Witcombe; Michael Jenkins
- Directed by: Igor Auzins
- Starring: Robyn Nevin; David Cameron; Judy Davis; Rowena Wallace; Jacki Weaver; Rod Mullinar
- Country of origin: Australia
- Original language: English
- No. of episodes: 9

Production
- Running time: 60 minutes

Original release
- Release: 24 September 1980 – 1980

Water Under the Bridge is a 1980 miniseries based on the 1977 novel by Sumner Locke Elliott.

The novel was one of Elliott's most acclaimed.

The budget was $1.5 million.

== Cast ==
=== Main ===
- Robyn Nevin as Shasta
- David Cameron as Neil
- Judy Davis as Carrie Mazzini
- Rowena Wallace as Honor Mazzini
- Jacki Weaver as Maggie McGhee
- Linden Wilkinson as Ida Flag
- John Howard as Archie
- Rod Mullinar as Don Brandywine
- Anne Scott-Pendlebury as Mona

=== Recurring ===
- Anthony Hawkins as Mason (2 episodes)
- Arthur Dignam as Maynard Dickens (2 episodes)
- Christopher Milne as Ben Mazzini (4 episodes)
- Deidre Rubenstein as Lainey (3 episodes)
- Lesley Baker as Nurse Vickers (3 episodes)
- Peter Whitford as T.C. Shallicott (3 episodes)
- Ralph Cotterill as Mr Flagg (4 episodes)

=== Guests ===
- Briony Behets as Claire
- Frank Gallacher as Luigi Mazzini
- Graeme Blundell as Ralph
- John Clayton as Rev Scott
- Kerry Armstrong as Dora
- Lorna Lesley as Nurse Vickers
- Lulu Pinkus as Ann
- Peta Toppano as Uke
- Peter Cummins as Rumbolt
- Sean Scully as Pete
- Terry Gill as Rex
- Tommy Dysart as Hamish

== Premise ==
The story follows Neil Atkins, a man torn between his goals and the women surrounding him.

== Reception ==
The mini series, aired on Network 10, was considered a ratings disappointment.
