= A Slice of Life (1983 film) =

- Directed by: John D. Lamond
- Written by: Alan Hopgood
- Produced by: John D. Lamond
- Starring: Robin Nedwell; John Ewart; Juliet Jordan
- Cinematography: Ross Berryman
- Edited by: Jill Rice
- Music by: Brian May
- Production company: John Lamond Motion Picture Enterprises
- Release date: 1983
- Running time: 100 mins
- Country: Australia
- Language: English

A Slice of Life is a 1983 Australian comedy film about having a vasectomy directed by John D. Lamond and starring Robin Nedwell, John Ewart and Juliet Jordan.

== Plot ==
Toby Morris enters hospital to remove a cyst from his hand. He wakes up to find not only has the cyst been removed but he has been given a vasectomy. Toby develops a phobia against hospitals and becomes a Casanova. Then he finds that the vasectomy may not have worked after all.

== Selected cast ==
- Robin Nedwell as Toby
- John Ewart as Hughes
- Juliet Jordan as Wendy
- Jane Clifton as Fay
- Caz Lederman as Sally
- Dina Mann as Barbara
- Amanda Muggleton as Eva
- Julie Nihill as Pam
- Lulu Pinkus as Addy
- Alan Hopgood as Dr Williams
- Louise Siversen as Nurse

== Production ==
It was filmed in Melbourne from 11 January to 27 February 1982.

== Reception ==
The film was never released theatrically.
