= Milan Hudecek =

Czech-born Australian inventor and entrepreneur

- Born: 9 January 1954 (age 72)

Milan Hudecek AM (pron. who-de-check, born 9 January 1954) is a Czech-born Australian inventor and entrepreneur. He pioneered the fields of assistive technology for the blind (in particular computing for the blind) and radio communications (in particular software-defined radios). He is a Member of the Order of Australia, winner of the Winston Gordon Award for Technological Advancement in the Field of Blindness and Visual Impairment, and the Rolls-Royce & Qantas Award of Engineering Excellence.

== Professional career ==
Founder (1983) and managing director of the Melbourne based Australian Export Award-winning Robotron Group, Hudecek is credited with the invention of the world's first computer for the blind, the Eureka A4, and a number of other assistive products such as reading machines for the blind.

Hudecek is also the founder (1991) of the Australian company radixon Group (formerly Rosetta Laboratories), specializing in various radio communications equipment, in particular software-defined radio. The company's first product was "WiNRADiO" – a wide-band communications receiver on a PC card, the first such product of its kind. An article describing early WiNRADiO products appeared in 1998 in Wired magazine. Radixon Group now sells its computer-controlled radio communications receivers and associated hardware and software under the brand name WiNRADiO.

In the 1997 Australia Day Honours Hudecek was made a Member of the Order of Australia for his "service to people with disabilities through the invention of a laptop computer and other technology for use by people who are blind or partially sighted".
