= Christopher Milne =

Australian actor and writer

- Born: 24 May 1950 (age 76); Australia
- Education: Monash University
- Occupations: Actor, writer
- Known for: Water Under the Bridge (1980); Neighbours (1985; 1998)
- Spouse: Denise Drysdale (m. 1979; div. 1990)
- Children: 2

Christopher Milne (born 24 May 1950) is an Australian actor and writer who has scripted episodes of Prisoner and Neighbours, as well as appearing on the shows as a performer.

== Early life ==
Milne studied a Bachelor of Civil Engineering at Melbourne's Monash University. After graduating, he worked as an engineer for 18 months, before realising it wasn't for him. He then joined a theatre group and trained with a film and television school, before auditioning for various television roles. Between acting roles, he drove a taxi and picked potatoes for extra income.

== Career ==
Milne played Chris in the soap opera Bellbird from 1967 until 1977. He appeared in the 1979 vampire horror film Thirst and the 1979 sexploitation film Felicity.

He played Ben Mazzini in 1980 miniseries Water Under The Bridge, based on the Australian book of the same name, alongside Judy Davis.

Milne originated the character of Philip Martin on Neighbours in 1985, when the program aired on Network Seven, before Ian Rawlings took over the role in 1992. He returned to Neighbours in 1998, to play journalist Declan Hewitt.

Milne was a script editor for Crawford Productions, and wrote scripts for numerous episodes of Prisoner, Neighbours and Starting Out. He has written children's books (ages 6–13) for many years and his Naughty Stories for Good Boys and Girls (based on his two sons) is a winner of The Young Australians Best Book Award. He recorded 13 of the stories for the BBC in London.

== Personal life ==
Milne was married to television presenter Denise Drysdale for ten years, until their separation in 1989. Together, they had two sons, but ended their marriage when they realised they did not have much in common. They have a grandson. Milne subsequently remarried.

== Filmography ==
=== Film ===
Year	Work	Role	Notes
1978	Felicity	Miles	
1979	Snapshot	Book Marker	
1979	Thirst	David	
1980	Dead Man's Float (aka Smugglers Cove)	Thug 1	
1982	Breakfast in Paris	Craig	

=== Television ===
Year	Work	Role	Notes
1967–1977	Bellbird	Chris	Regular role
1974	Division 4	David Porter	1 episode
1978	The Sullivans	Billy	4 episodes
1978–1981	Cop Shop	Nick Williamson / Andrew Lawford / Max White / Bill Morris	10 episodes
1979	Skyways	Brent Clarke / Hank	2 episodes
1980	Water Under The Bridge	Ben Mazzini	Miniseries, 4 episodes
1981; 1984	Prisoner	Tony Morton / Barry Rockman	7 episodes
1983–1984	Carson's Law	John Slade / Matt Gilbert / Johnny Watkins / Bill Ponsford	5 episodes
1984	Special Squad	Sanders	1 episode
1985	The Henderson Kids	Stan	2 episodes
1985	Neighbours	Philip Martin	Recurring
1989	The Flying Doctors	Robert Morton	1 episode
1991	Chances	Bank Manager / Mr Crane	4 episodes
1994	Janus	Alan Tyrrell	1 episode
1994	Law of the Land	Minister	1 episode
1996	Blue Heelers	Patrick Munroe	1 episode
1996	Halifax f.p.	Harry	1 episode
1997	State Coroner	Bryce Hall	1 episode
1998	Neighbours	Declan Hewitt	Recurring
1998–2003	Stingers	Phillip Matthews / Brad Logan	2 episodes
2000	The Games	Bernard Milne	1 episode
2002	Something in the Air	Trent Bradley	1 episode
2008	Satisfaction	Funeral Celebrant	1 episode
2010	City Homicide	Jim Montague	1 episode
