= The Keepers (Australian TV series) =

Australian drama television series

- Genre: Drama; Crime
- Created by: Tracey Robertson; Nathan Mayfield
- Written by: John Reeves; Ian McFadyen; Catherine Millar
- Directed by: Noel Price; Kevin James Dobson
- Starring: Bill Hunter; David Cameron
- Composer: Greg Sneddon
- Country of origin: Australia
- Original language: English
- No. of series: 1
- No. of episodes: 9

Production
- Producer: Noel Price
- Running time: 50 minutes

Original release
- Network: ABC
- Release: 5 April – 31 May 1984

The Keepers is a 1984 Australian drama television series created by Noel Price and starring Bill Hunter and David Cameron as Fisheries and Wildlife officers.

== Synopsis ==
The series follows the personal and professional lives of two mismatched Fisheries and Wildlife officers, Jack Wolfe and his new assistant Rick Zammit.

== Production ==
Most of the series was shot on location in the Dandenong Ranges. The show's crew used multiple tricks to fake the killing of the wildlife that Fisheries and Wildlife officers want to protect including frozen ducks and a diseased deer that had been recently culled.

== Cast ==
- Bill Hunter as Jack Wolfe
- David Cameron as Rick Zammit
- Catherine Wilkin as Aggie French
- Vikki Blanche as Kim French
- Nina Landis as Miriam Woods

== Episodes ==
No.	Title	Written by	Original release date
1	"Probation"	John Reeves	5 April 1984
2	"Land of Plenty"	Unknown	12 April 1984
3	"Man's Best Friend"	Unknown	19 April 1984
4	"Fair Game"	Unknown	26 April 1984
5	"A Dying Breed"	Unknown	3 May 1984
6	"The Homecoming"	Unknown	10 May 1984
7	"Terms of Agreement"	Unknown	17 May 1984
8	"Taking the Bait"	Unknown	24 May 1984
9	"The Country Mouse"	Unknown	31 May 1984

== Reception ==
Garrie Hutchinson of The Age wrote "The good things are the performances of gruff Bill Hunter enthusiastic David Cameron and the calm Catherine Wilkin as Aggie, the den mother of animal and human alike. The storylines, and the writing in general, suffer because they have to be about some Big Issue." Barbara Hooks of The Age states "The Keepers is pleasantly diverting drama. competently scripted and performed and appealingly photographed. It's timely in its subject mater, informative but careful to avoid sermonising. I'll be tuning in for more." Brian Courtis, also from The Age finishes his review "So what made it so special? Superb performances from all in the cast. a tight and witty script, refreshing camera angles, Greg Sneddon's music ... and Noel Price, the man who put it together."

In The Sydney Morning Herald Jenny Tabakoff described it as "nice" saying "It's well acted, well scripted, socially aware but, despite a modicum of excitement, it makes pleasant rather than compelling viewing." The Sydney Morning Herald's Elizabeth Riddell was critical of the show calling Wolfe a bully and said the script was "developing into one long exercise in truculence and petulance?"
