= My First Wife =

- Promotional poster
- Directed by: Paul Cox
- Written by: Bob Ellis; Paul Cox
- Based on: story by Paul Cox
- Produced by: Paul Cox; Jane Ballantyne
- Starring: John Hargreaves; Wendy Hughes; David Cameron
- Cinematography: Yuri Sokol
- Edited by: Tim Lewis
- Music by: Ann Boyd; Renée Geyer
- Release date: 13 September 1984
- Running time: 96 minutes
- Country: Australia
- Language: English
- Budget: A$690,000
- Box office: A$413,199 (Australia)

My First Wife is a 1984 Australian drama film directed by Paul Cox. The film won several AFI Awards in 1984.

== Plot ==
John is a composer and radio presenter. His wife Helen tells him she is leaving him, having had an affair with one of his friends, Tim. Helen moves out with their daughter Lucy to her parents' house.

John becomes mororse and potentially violent. He sleeps with a work colleague, Hilary, and takes pills and wakes up in a psychiatric unit. Helen movies back in briefly but he tries to sleep with her when she does not want to and he hits her. Helen keeps seeing Tim. John abducts Lucy and the police do nothing. John returns Lucy to her mother.

During this John's father dies.

== Cast ==
- John Hargreaves as John
- Wendy Hughes as Helen
- Lucy Angwin as Lucy
- David Cameron as Tom
- Anna Maria Monticelli (Anna Jemison) as Hilary
- Betty Lucas as Helen's Mother
- Lucy Uralov as John's Mother
- Robin Lovejoy as John's father
- Charles 'Bud' Tingwell as Helen's Father
- Jon Finlayson as Bernard
- Julia Blake as Kirstin
- Dennis Miller as Public Bar Patron (uncredited)

== Production ==
The film was based on the breakdown of Cox's marriage. He started writing the script, showed it to Bob Ellis and the two men wrote the screenplay together. (Ellis says they spent a day and a half on it.)

Film Victoria invested $150,000 and loaned $120,000. The original budget was $700,000 but it was made for less.

The film was shot mostly at a house in Williamstown in Melbourne.

== Music ==
- Choir: Members of the Tudor Choristers directed by David Carolane
- Christoph Willibald Gluck: "Orpheus & Euridice".
- Berliner Symphoniker – Hermann Prey, Conductor – Horst Stein
- Joseph Haydn - "Paukenmesse", Bayerischen Rundfunks Symphony Orchestra & Chorus, Conductor – Rafael Kubelik, Polygram
- Ann Boyd - "As I crossed a Bridge of Dreams", "Cycle of love", Faber Music Ltd.
- Carl Orff - "Carmine Burana"
- Czech Philharmonic Orchestra & Chorus, Conducted by Vaclev Smetacek, Supraphon
- Rene Geyer - "Hot Minuets", Mushroom Records, Australia
- Frans Sussmayr - "Grandfather's Birthday Celebration", Hungarian Radio Children's Chorus, Budapest Symphony Orchestra, Conductor – Laszlo Csanyl

== Box office ==
My First Wife grossed $413,199 at the box office in Australia, which is equivalent to $1,049,525 in 2009 dollars.

== Awards ==
My First Wife won in 1984 AFI Awards in the Best Actor in a Lead Role (John Hargreaves), Best Director (Paul Cox), Best Original Screenplay (Paul Cox, Bob Ellis) categories and was nominated in 4 more categories (Best Film, Best Editor, Best Actress, Best Cinematographer). Paul Cox also won the 1986 Grand Prix award at Film Fest Gent in 1986.

== See also ==
- Cinema of Australia

== Notes ==
- Murray, Scott (1994). Australian Cinema. St.Leonards, NSW.: Allen & Unwin/AFC. p. 275. ISBN 1-86373-311-6.
