= David Cameron (Australian actor) =

Australian actor

- Occupation: Actor
- Years active: 1967-2016
- Notable work: The Keepers, Water Under the Bridge

David Cameron is an Australian actor and director.

Lead screen roles he has played are The Keepers as Rick Zammit, Water Under the Bridge as Neil Atkins, and Down the Wind as Simon Jess. Other roles include Russell Hardwick in The Sullivans and Tom in My First Wife.

Cameron has a long theatre career including the first Australia staging of The Rocky Horror Show (1968, Independent Theatre) A Whip Round for Percy Grainger (1982, Playbox Theatre), and The Common Pursuit (1987, Russell Street Theatre).

== Awards ==
- 1981 Sammy Awards
  - Best actor in a television series - Water Under the Bridge - won
- 1981 Penguin Award
  - Best sustained performance - Water Under the Bridge - won
- 1981 Logie Awards
  - Best actor in a TV mini-series - Water Under the Bridge - nominated
