= Naughty Stories for Good Boys and Girls (series) =

Short stories collections by Christopher Milne

- Author: Christopher Milne
- Genre: Children's
- Publisher: Milne Books
- Published: 1990s-2000s
- No. of books: 13

Naughty Stories for Good Boys and Girls (more commonly known simply as Naughty Stories) is a series of 13 books containing 4 short stories each about naughty children who learn a lesson at the end written by Christopher Milne. The stories are each around 5-10 pages long, and altogether, the 13 books have sold 550 000 copies worldwide. Christopher Milne was rejected by 16 Australian publishers and then went on to self-publish. The first book titled Naughty Stories for Good Boys and Girls won the Young Australian's Best Book Award in 1998.

== Series ==
There are 13 books in the series, each with 4 stories, making a total of 52 stories.

== Spinoffs ==
There are also spinoffs of Naughty Stories (released by the same author):

- The Naughty Nine
- Scary Stories
