= John Robert Booker =

Australian geomechanical engineer (1942–1998)

John Robert Booker (1942, Sydney–1998, Sydney) was an Australian theoretical geomechanic. He was an elected fellow of the Australian Academy of Science and Engineers Australia. He was an appointed Officer of the Order of Australia.
