= Garnet H. Carroll =

Australian actor, theatre owner and theatrical director and producer

Garnet H. Carroll (OBE)
- Born: Garnet Hannell Carroll; 4 December 1902; Singleton, New South Wales, Australia
- Died: 23 August 1964 (aged 62); South Yarra, Melbourne, Australian
- Occupations: Actor; Theatre owner; Theatre director; Theatre producer; Theatre Manager; Company Managing Director
- Known for: Carroll-Fuller Theatre Company Ltd.

Garnet Hannell Carroll, OBE (4 December 1902 – 23 August 1964) was an Australian actor, theatre owner and theatrical director and producer. He helped coloratura soprano Gertrude Johnson establish the Melbourne National Theatre.

== Early life ==
Carroll was born on 4 December 1902 in Singleton, New South Wales. His parents were dentist Roger Bebe Carroll and his wife Mildred Lorne (née Smith). Carroll attended Singleton Grammar School. He left home at age 14, only reuniting with his family in 1921 in East Maitland.

== Career ==
Having originally worked as a repairman, Carroll became a performer. He first came to professional prominence in touring with the company of Lionel Walsh in a production of musical comedy No, No, Nanette and upon the opening of the Empire Theatre in Sydney, he featured in the chorus line of the musical Sunny in 1927. The following year he played in another musical Rio Rita, in which he also served as stage manager.

In New Zealand he took up post as a theatre manager for Ben Fuller, and married Australian actress Catherine "Kitty" Stewart Elliott in on 11 April 1930.

From 1934 to 1935, he was the stage manager of a few operas directed by English director Charles Moore. In 1939, Carroll became the managing director of Fullers' Theatres which was rechristened Carroll Fuller Theatre Company in 1946. Carroll had many other holdings in theatre, including the Capital Theatre in Perth, the Stockton Theatre in Newcastle, and part of the Princess Theatre in Melbourne. He was instrumental in the establishment of the Elizabethan Theatre in Sydney which opened in July 1955; Carroll personally invited Sir Ralph Richardson and Dame Sybil Thorndike to its opening.

After World War II, Carroll introduced several acts to Australia, such as the Ballet Rambert (1947–48), the Shakespeare Memorial Theatre (1949), the Vienna Boys' Choir (1954), the Chinese Classical Theatre (1956) and the Sadler's Wells Opera Company (1960, 1962). Carroll also staged many new American musicals like The Most Happy Fella, The Sound of Music, The King and I, and Carousel, as well as Kismet, which he produced himself in 1954. Some of Carroll's stage productions, including West Side Story and The Diary of Anne Frank, were commercial failures.

Carroll was awarded the Order of the British Empire (OBE) in 1949.

== Personal life and death ==
Carroll was an Anglican. He was a member of the Victorian and the Green Room clubs, and spent his free time swimming and yachting. He also suffered from diabetes for over a decade and died of cardiovascular disease on 23 August 1964 in South Yarra, Melbourne, survived by his wife and their son.
