= Barbara Worley =

Australian sports administrator

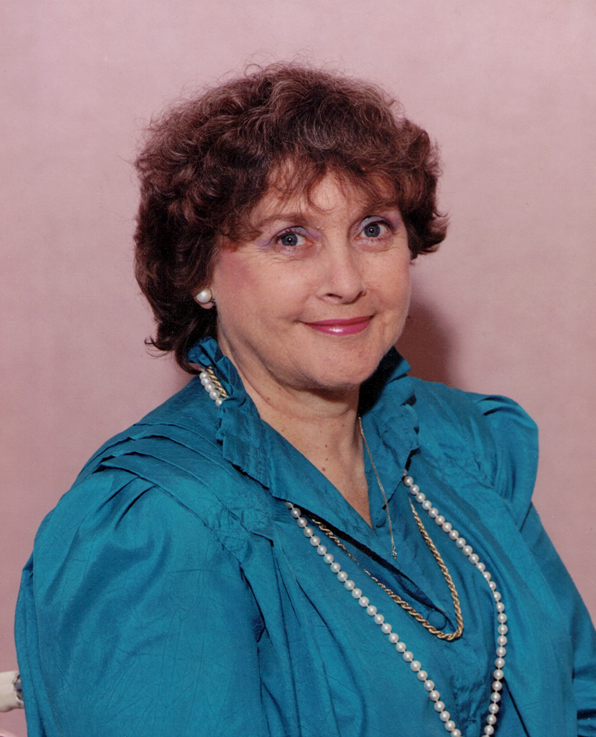
- Portrait of Barbara Worley

Personal information
- Nationality: Australia
- Born: 13 September 1934 Melbourne, Victoria, Australia
- Died: 1 May 2014 (aged 79) Adelaide, South Australia, Australia

Barbara Elizabeth Worley, AM (13 September 1934 – 1 May 2014) was an Australian sports administrator who played a leading role in the development of Paralympic sport in Australia particularly in terms of sport administration.

== Personal ==
She was born on 13 September 1934 in Melbourne, Victoria. In 1959, she married Don Worley and they moved to the United Kingdom. She returned to live in Adelaide, South Australia in 1963. In 1967, she was in a motor vehicle accident whilst travelling to Melbourne. The motor vehicle rolled over and her lap style seat belt crushed her. The accident left her with a broken spine. At the time of the accident, she was married to Don and they had three young boys. After the accident, she spent a year in Royal Adelaide Hospital. She became involved in sport as part of her rehabilitation. She died in Adelaide on 1 May 2014.

== Sports career ==
Worley's sporting achievements included winning gold and silver medals in table tennis at the 1974 Commonwealth Paraplegic Games in Dunedin, New Zealand. In 1976, she was the Australian Women's Wheelchair Table Tennis Champion.

In the 1980s she became involved in the administration of sport for people with a disability. In 1982, she was the first president of the Wheelchair Sports Association of South Australia. In 1988, she was President of the Australian Confederation of Sports for the Disabled. The Confederation was responsible for raising funds and organising the Australian team to the 1988 Seoul Paralyampics. The fundraising program raised just over $1 million. Worley and her husband Don were able to convince Hon Graham Richardson, Minister for Sport to cover the costs of the Australian Broadcasting Corporation(ABC) in filming the Games. Her husband Don began to film sport for the disabled in the early 1970s and the ABC's involvement came a few years later. In 1975, he filmed a documentary on the FESPIC Games. This is regarded as the start of the ABC's involvement in the sport for the disabled. Donald Worley's films were donated to the National Film and Sound Archive.

In 1989, she was appointed to the Australian Sports Commission's Board, a position that she held until 1992. Worley has also been a member of other board and committees including: Sport Arts & Recreation Council (SPARC), Disability Information and Resource Centre (DIRC), Sport, Art & Recreation Council for People with Disabilities and Australian Bicentennial Authority Consultative Committee on Recreation and Sport for the Disabled.

Worley has been employed special-needs consultant to Adelaide-based travel company Travelaffare. This role organised wheelchair-accessible holidays to overseas destinations.

== Recognition ==
Worley has received the following honours in recognition of her work for disability sport and sports administration:

- 1997 – Member of the Order of Australia (AM)
- 2000 – Australian Sports Medal
- 2001 – PARAQUAD SA Presidents Award
