= This Year Jerusalem =

- Directed by: Terry Turle
- Cinematography: Terry Turle
- Release date: March 1969
- Country: Australia
- Language: English

This Year Jerusalem is an Australian documentary film about Israel directed by Terry Turle.

The film was successfully screened at the Art Deco Palais Theatre in St Kilda, Melbourne. This inspired a number of other Australian filmmakers to hire theatres and screen their own movies.
