= Australia After Dark =

- Directed by: John D. Lamond
- Produced by: John D. Lamond
- Starring: Gina Allen
- Narrated by: Hayes Gordon
- Production companies: Hexagon Productions; AAD Films; John Lamond Motion Picture Enterprises
- Distributed by: Roadshow
- Release date: 1975
- Running time: 90 minute
- Country: Australia
- Language: English
- Budget: AU$50,000
- Box office: AU$1.25 million

Australia After Dark is a 1975 documentary directed by John D. Lamond. It was his first feature.

== Production ==
The film was inspired by such movies as Mondo Cane which Lamond deliberately copied:

I borrowed a 16mm print of it and ran it on a closed circuit cinema thing and stopped and started the projector and looked at it. It ran on a sort of cycle – pathos, humour, oddity, nudity. I thought okay, what I need to do is shoot about fifty sequences, cut it into something coherent and pacey, and made it on the same sort of thing. I’d have something sexy, then something odd, then something really way-out, then something light hearted. And always do it tongue in cheek, and not have any sequence in the film run longer than about two minutes. And anything sexy, I’ll make it way-out or pretty.

Hexagon Productions invested some money in the movie but the Australian Film Development Corporation did not. Lamond later re-shot some sequences after the initial shoot.

== Release ==
The film was shot on 16mm but was blown up to 35mm in Sweden by the firm that did Ingmar Bergman's Scenes from a Marriage which cost an extra $14,000. Lamond made twenty prints, showed it around Australia and the film was a big hit. Lamond:

I remember Terry Jackman, from Birch Carroll & Coyle, he said to me, “Your film’s a pile of shit, but it’ll make a lot of money for us.” He didn’t really mean that, but he DID really make a lot of money from it!

Lamond later explained why he thought the film was so successful:

It was different. Those were the days before colour television and anything that wasn't odd or sexy, was at least in colour. It was a local film and pretty controversial. Also, they didn't release it in sleazy skinflic houses, but in respectable cinemas like the Swanston in Melbourne and the Cinema City complex in Sydney. It had a fairly respectable campaign and we spent $17,500 promoting it.

In the 1970s, the film was also released in Britain, cut by the British Board of Film Classification to about 70 minutes, from the Australian prints, of 82 minutes for the R-rated version, and 90 minutes for the X-rated version.
