= Liz Mullinar =

British-Australian film casting consultant

- Born: Elizabeth Laura Hopkinson; 12 March 1945 (age 81); London, England, UK
- Occupation: Founder of Heal For Life Foundation
- Known for: Film casting consultant; co-founder of Advocate for Survivors of Child Abuse and Heal For Life Foundation; Member of the Order of Australia; Australian Centenary Medal Winner

Elizabeth Laura Mullinar (née Hopkinson) AM is a English-born Australian former film casting consultant.

She is one of the founders of Advocates for Survivors of Child Abuse (now Blue Knot Foundation) and is the Founder of the Heal For Life Foundation (formerly Mayumarri Healing Centre) and created the TREE (Trust, Release, Empower Educate) Model of Trauma Recovery. Mullinar is regarded as an expert in the field of trauma.

In 2019, she presented the TREE Model at the International Congress of Trauma and Attachment alongside other trauma experts including American psychiatrist Daniel J. Siegel, and British psychoanalyst Peter Fonagy OBE.

== Honours ==
She was made a Member of the Order of Australia (AM) in the 1997 Australia Day Honours for her services to the performing arts and entertainment as a theatrical and film casting consultant and to the community.

She was awarded the Australian Centenary Medal in 2001 for her services as co-founder and advocate for Advocates for Survivors of Child Abuse. In 2011, she was a State Finalist in the Australian of the Year Awards.

=== TED Talk ===
In 2011, Mullinar gave a TEDx Talk on treating the core problem of addiction and mental illness. The talk explains the link between trauma and mental illness and has had over 185,000 views.

== Career ==
=== Film casting director ===
Liz Mullinar was born Elizabeth Laura Hopkinson. She was a casting director in the Australian film industry for more than 25 years. She worked as a consultant in the early careers of actors including Nicole Kidman, Cate Blanchett, Portia De Rossi, and Geoffrey Rush Her company was responsible for casting such films as Picnic at Hanging Rock, Shine and Babe.

=== Founder, Advocate for Survivors of Child Abuse (Blue Knot Foundation) ===
After a visit to a hospital to visit her newborn niece, Mullinar experienced a "triggered response" which she states entailed weeks of illness and sleepless nights. With help from a professional, Mullinar states she recovered suppressed memories of being sexually abused as a child by a doctor. After this experience, Mullinar left her career in film and television to form the Australian Association for Recovered Memories in 1995. The organization later changed its name to We Remember, then Advocates for Survivors of Child Abuse. now known as the Blue Knot Foundation.

=== Founder, Heal For Life Foundation (Formerly Mayumarri Healing Centre) ===
In 1997, she co-founded The Mayumarri Healing Centre (now Heal For Life Foundation) with husband Rodney Phillips to provide a safe location where survivors of child abuse could recover from their ordeal. According to Mayumarri's financial records, the centre received more than $1 million between 2003 and 2005, of which nearly half was in the form of government grants.

In 1999, the organisation changed its name to the Heal For Life Foundation to better reflect the services provided. The centre promotes itself as providing affordable effective healing for survivors of all forms of childhood trauma. By this time, the centre had developed a specific model of trauma recovery (TREE) designed to help survivors heal from trauma by teaching them how to release emotions suppressed at the time of the trauma.

The TREE model of trauma recovery is based on recommendations from Phoenix Australia (formerly Australian Centre for Post Traumatic Mental Health), where the cornerstone of treatment involves confronting the traumatic memory.

Independent evaluation by Central Coast Research and Evaluation published on the Heal For Life website, found the program is able to achieve statistically significant improvements in participant mental health, social and emotional functioning, pain and vitality index scores. It also found these improvements were present 6 months and 4 years post-program, indicating the program achieves long-term results.

Currently, the organisation does not accept government funding for its programs.

=== Author ===
Mullinar has written three books. Breaking The Silence - Survivors of Child Abuse Speak Out, The Liz Mullinar Story, and Heal For Life: How to heal yourself from the pain of childhood trauma

== Controversy ==
Mullinar has faced controversy for her beliefs in recovered memories and the practice of satanic ritual abuse within the community. Richard Guilliatt, a journalist for The Australian and author of the book Talk of the Devil: Repressed Memory and the Ritual Abuse Witch-Hunt has been an outspoken critic of the validity of claims by survivors of child abuse, including Mullinar and her colleague in trauma advocacy, Dr Cathy Kezelman.

Some critics have accused Mullinar as contributing to a moral panic. due to her position on ritual abuse. However, the Royal Commission into Institutional Responses to Child Sexual Abuse revealed a significant issue with child sexual abuse within ritualistic institutions. According to research conducted by Central Coast Research and Evaluation, 6.3% of Mayumarri clients claimed to be victims of Ritual Abuse.

After speaking publicly about her ordeal as a child in response to an article by Richard Guilliatt, Mullinar received significant media attention. Initially, Mullinar believed her future in advocacy would be with the church and she completed her Bachelor of Theology with the intent to become an Anglican minister. She was rejected by the Anglican Archdiocese of Newcastle as an unsuitable candidate for ordination.

It was later reported by the Royal Commission in regards to the Anglican Archdiocese of Newcastle: "The cumulative effect of a number of systemic issues allowed a group of perpetrators to operate within the diocese for at least 30 years. The report found that systemic issues included a focus on protecting the reputation of the Church and its powerful and influential members. Abusive and predatory sexual relationships were misrepresented as consensual homosexual relationships."

Former guests and volunteer staff, as well as a former board member the Heal For Life, have called for an independent investigation into damaging practices. They include allegations of inadequate staff training, insufficient health professionals on staff, a high incidence of self-harm and false recovered memories of ritual abuse. No evidence of wrongdoing has been recorded by any regulatory body.

Mullinar remains an advocate for the use of peer support in Heal For Life's programs, which are supervised by registered psychologists. Peer support refers to the use of trained people with lived experience of the issues facing service users. International standards in trauma-informed practice confirm peer support is essential for trauma recovery.

Heal For Life is independently audited and has received accreditation through the Quality Innovation Performance Council, an organisation that provides third-party verification of service safety and quality based on governing standards in the Australian community sector.

Regarding recovered memories, she states that "Anyone who recovers memories, who has flashbacks, their child is telling the truth. The child at the age it happened to them is telling the truth of what happened to them. A therapist cannot create the truth…"

The Heal For Life website states that guests are to be believed and have their story validated as part of the services provided. Heal For Life has a policy that discourages guests from 'swapping stories' to prevent the risk of "vicarious trauma, re-traumatisation or the potential spread of memories".

== Bibliography ==
- Mullinar, Liz & Hopkinson, Simon (1997). The Liz Mullinar Story. Sydney: Hodder & Stoughton. ISBN 0-7336-0482-X.
- Mullinar, Liz (1997). Breaking The Silence - Survivors of Child Abuse Speak Out. Sydney: Hodder & Stoughton. ISBN 0733604838.
- Mullinar, Liz (2020). Heal For Life: How to heal yourself from the pain of childhood trauma. Sydney: Heal For Life Foundation. ISBN 9780648536505.
