= Aunty Jack Introduces Colour =

1975 Australian television special

- Directed by: Maurice Murphy
- Starring: Grahame Bond; Garry McDonald; Rory O'Donoghue
- Music by: Rory O'Donoghue
- Production company: Australian Broadcasting Corporation
- Distributed by: Australian Broadcasting Corporation
- Release date: 28 February 1975
- Running time: 5 minutes
- Country: Australia
- Language: English

"Aunty Jack Introduces Colour" is a one-off television special edition of The Aunty Jack Show, broadcast on ABC television on the night of 28 February 1975. It was created two years after The Aunty Jack Show finished, and featured the main character, Aunty Jack, played by Grahame Bond, even though she had been killed off in the last season in 1973. The episode was five minutes long and was the first show on ABC television to be broadcast in colour. (Note: Certain skits from the original two series were shot in colour, but were broadcast in black and white. Those colour episodes were included on later DVD releases.)

== Features ==
The special shows the three main characters trying to combat the invasion of television by the colour monster, but Aunty Jack (Grahame Bond), Thin Arthur (Rory O'Donoghue), and Kid Eager (Garry McDonald) are swallowed into the world of colour television, as colour wipes from the bottom to the top of the screen, converting the ABC television into colour. The characters attempt to resist, with Aunty Jack making a futile endeavour to fight the process with "colour remover".

The aspect ratio of the special was 4:3.

== Cast ==
- Aunty Jack - Grahame Bond
- Kid Eager - Garry McDonald
- Thin Arthur - Rory O'Donoghue

== Broadcast dates ==
The special started at three minutes to midnight, so that the episode would swipe to colour at midnight, beating all other Australian television stations, which changed to colour on 1 March 1975, although some sources incorrectly say that the episode was aired on 1 March.

The special was broadcast in Australia at 28 February 1975.

== See also ==
- Aunty Jack Sings Wollongong
- Farewell Aunty Jack
- Wollongong the Brave
