= Jesus Christ Superstar (Original Australian Cast Recording) =

1972 album

Cast recording by Original Australian Cast
- Released: 1972
- Genre: Rock
- Length: 58:36
- Label: MCA
- Producer: Patrick Flynn

Jesus Christ Superstar or Jesus Christ Superstar – Original Australian Cast Recording is an album released in late 1972 on MCA Records. Jesus Christ Superstar is a rock opera created by Tim Rice and Andrew Lloyd Webber in 1970. The earliest Australian version was staged from May 1972 to February 1974. This album features Trevor White (as Jesus), Jon English (as Judas) and Michele Fawdon (as Mary Magdalene). Together with other cast members, they performed vocals for a studio recording. It was produced by Patrick Flynn, the show's musical director and a conductor for Opera Australia. The album peaked at No. 17 on the Go-Set Albums Chart in June 1973, while it reached No. 13 on the Kent Music Report and remained on its charts for 54 weeks. It appeared in the top 100 on the 1974 End of Year Albums Chart. In May 1973, the album was awarded a gold record for sales of 50,000 albums.

The cast recording from the 1992 production won the Aria for Highest Selling Album and nominated for Best Original Soundtrack/Cast/Show Album.

== Stage show ==
=== Venue ===
Capitol Theatre, Sydney (1972–1973) followed by a season at the Palais Theatre, Melbourne and a tour of other cities and towns.

=== Dates ===
4 May 1972 – February 1974 – 700+ performances.

=== Production team ===
Production credits:

- Music by Andrew Lloyd Webber
- Book and lyrics by Tim Rice
- Producer: Harry M. Miller
- Director: Jim Sharman
- Executive Producer: Frederick J. Gibson
- Associate Executive Producer: Garry Van Egmond
- Stage Director Sandra McKenzie
- Stage Manager: Ken Gregory
- Scenic Design: Brian Thomson
- Musical Director: Patrick Flynn
- Associate Musical Director and Principal Conductor: Michael Carlos
- Costume Design: Rex Cramphorne
- Sound: John Morrison
- Dance Director: Keith Bain

=== Principal cast ===
Cast credits:

- Trevor White (Jesus)
- Jon English (Judas)
- Michele Fawdon (Mary Magdalene) 1972–73
- Marcia Hines (Mary Magdalene) 1973–74
- Arthur Dignam (Pontius Pilate) 1972–73
- Robin Ramsay (Pontius Pilate)
- Joseph Dicker (King Herod) Sydney 1972
- Reg Livermore (King Herod) Sydney 1973
- Jon Finlayson (King Herod) Sydney 1973
- John Allan (King Herod) Sydney 1974
- Doug Parkinson (King Herod) 1973–74
- Stevie Wright (Simon Zealotes)
- Peter North (Caiaphas)
- John Young (Annas)
- Brian Withers (Priest 1)
- Tom Dysart (Priest 2) 1972
- Peter Noble (Priest 2)
- Michael Caton (Priest 3) 1972
- Bill Binks (Priest 3)
- Rory O'Donoghue (Peter) 1972
- Wayne Matthews (Peter)
- Frank Howson, Bill Paton (Stage Attendants)

=== Supporting cast and chorus ===
Supporting cast and chorus credits:

- Pete Bergen
- Creenagh Bradstock
- Stephen Campbell
- Michael Caton
- Hele Cornish
- Jennie Cullen
- Denni
- Joe Dicker
- Beverly Evans
- Margaret Figucio
- Robyn Fisher
- Geoff Gilmour
- Margaret Goldie
- Nick Hill
- Phill Hobbins
- Gary Hoffman
- Shauna Jensen
- Paul Johnston
- Merryn Joseph
- George Kent
- Peter Kirby
- Nick Lush
- Peter Maloney
- Natalie Mosco
- Sharon Murphy
- Bjarne Ohlin
- Sue Robinson
- Shayna Stewart
- Bonnie Truex
- Kim Whitehead

=== Musicians ===
- Mike Wade – guitar, band leader
- Ken Firth – bass guitar
- Jamie McKinley – piano, acoustic guitar
- Greg Henson – drums
- Michael Carlos – organ, Moog synthesizer
- Mike Reed – guitar
- Steve Doran - Keyboards, Piano

=== Cast and production notes ===
- Like its contemporaries Godspell and Hair, Superstar was unusual for a stage musical at that time, and its rock-based score demanded a very different vocal "skill-set" from that required for traditional musical theatre performance - specifically, the songs were, in the main, firmly rooted in the rock idiom, the singers were backed by an augmented rock band, using concert-scale amplification, and all the performers were required to use microphones. As a result, many members of the 'original production' casts around the world were drawn from outside the theatre world, and most were 'unknowns' in theatrical terms, although many already had extensive experience in pop-rock field. Most of the original Australian cast were relative unknowns - Trevor White, Jon English, Marcia Hines, Stevie Wright and Rory O'Donoghue all came from the rock scene (indeed, Wright had been one of Australia's top pop stars in the 1960s) although Robin Ramsay, Reg Livermore and Michelle Fawdon were all very experienced theatre and TV actors who were also accomplished singers.
- Following extensive auditions and rehearsals, the production was previewed in Australia with a short season of concert performances in major cities, debuting at the Adelaide Festival in mid-March 1972, then moving to Perth, Melbourne, Launceston, Hobart and Brisbane before beginning its initial theatrical season at the Capitol Theatre, Sydney. The gala premiere was held on Thursday 4 May, with tickets costing AU$5.20
- Numerous performers and members of the production team had previously worked on the acclaimed original 1969-70 Australian stage production of Hair, including producer Harry M. Miller, director Jim Sharman, designer Brian Thompson, Superstar orchestra members Micheal Carlos and Ken Firth (from noted Sydney progressive band Tully), actor-singer Reg Livermore and singer Marcia Hines.
- Superstar quickly became a sell-out success, running for over 700 performances, and it earned lavish praise from critics and audiences alike, but it was initially greeted with strong resistance from ultra-conservative elements of Australia's Christian community, who considered it to be blasphemous. During the show's early run, there were repeated protests outside the theatre, and several more serious incidents – co-star English was heckled and jostled by protestors after being recognized on his way into the theatre, an audience member threw a quantity of large coins (Australian 20c pieces) at English during a performance, one of which struck his head and cut him, but in the most serious incident a protester threw a Molotov cocktail at White – although fortunately the wick fell out before it could explode.
- Like her colleague Robin Ramsay (see below), Melbourne-based actress and singer Michele Fawdon was one of the few lead cast members who came from a 'straight' theatrical background. Already an experienced and popular actress of stage and screen, she was a familiar face thanks to her numerous TV roles, including many appearances on ABC and numerous roles in the popular Crawford Productions' police procedurals such as Homicide. Michelle departed Superstar in 1973, and went on to a successful stage and screen career, winning an AFI Award for Best Actress in 1979 for her lead role in the film Cathy's Child.
- Fawdon's successor in the role of Mary Magdalene, Marcia Hines, who came to Australia in 1969 to perform in Hair, was the first black performer in the shows's history to be cast in the role. After Superstar she became one of Australia's most popular and successful female recording artists during the Seventies, and was crowned "Queen of Pop" three years running, 1976–78 by TV Week readers. She is now a judge on Australian Idol.
- English went on to great success, initially as a solo singer in the mid-70s, scoring a number of major Australian pop hits including "Turn the Page" and "Hollywood Seven". He also originated and starred in the stage musical Paris (based on Homer's Iliad), but, in parallel with his musical career, he also became a popular TV actor. He continued to perform regularly around Australia until his sudden death in 2016, following an operation for a heart ailment. Superstar band members Mike Wade (guitar) and Greg Henson (drums), were part of English's backing band.
- Wright had been the former lead singer of top 1960s Australian pop group The Easybeats) but his show-stopping turn as Simon Zealotes in Superstar was instrumental in reviving his flagging career. After leaving the show he briefly worked with fellow cast member O'Donoghue on a concert tour and a TV special based around the hit TV comedyThe Aunty Jack Show and he subsequently formed the short-lived band, Black Tank with fellow cast members Rory O'Donoghue (guitar, vocals) and Ken Firth (bass) before forming his own backing combo, The Stevie Wright Band. He topped the Australian charts in 1975 with the epic three-part single "Evie", and released two acclaimed rock albums (produced and mainly written by his former Easybeats bandmates Harry Vanda and Geoege Young) but his later career was sporadic, and was seriously hampered by persistent substance addiction, physical injury and mental health problems. Wright.
- Like Fawdon, Ramsay was one of the few cast members of the original production who was already a familiar face in Australia. An experienced and versatile actor, Ramsay gained national prominence in 1967 when he was cast in the ABC's hugely popular nightly rural serial Bellbird, in which he played the devious and conniving local stock-and-station agent Charlie Cousens. Ramsay's dramatic departure from the series, in which his character fell to his death from the top of a grain silo, was a major TV event and was reportedly one of the most-watched moments in Australian TV history up to that time. After Superstar he went on to long and successful career in stage, film and television (including a role in the cult 1970s rock musical film Oz, although it was his voice which became best known in the 1970s after he was chosen to intone the health warning message "Medical authorities warn that smoking is a health hazard", which by law accompanied all tobacco advertising on TV, cinema and radio at that time.
- Classically trained actor-singer-musician-composer O'Donoghue (Peter) already had wide experience on the Sydney pop scene and in university revues when he joined Superstar. He left the production during 1973 after his TV career took off, although for some time he was simultaneously working on both Superstar and the landmark Australian TV comedy series, The Aunty Jack Show. He also co-starred in its spin-off, Wollongong the Brave. He also co-wrote all the music for both series with his co-star, longtime collaborator and friend Grahame Bond. The duo also worked in radio, and wrote music for film, TV, the stage and advertising. In later life he became a respected music teacher and triathlete.
- Firth and other musicians for the stage version, Phil Eizenberg on guitar and William "Billy" Miller on vocals, formed The Ferrets in 1975. Also on the soundtrack album were former Levi Smith's Clefs and Tully members Michael Carlos and Greg Henson. Carlos, on organ, piano and synthesiser, was the musical director of the backing band, The Superstars, for the stage show and album, alongside Henson, Wade (ex-Climax), Jamie McKinley on piano and Bruce Worral on bass guitar (ex-Sherbet).
- John Young (now known as John Paul Young) who had the role of Annas, enjoyed enormous success in the mid-late 1970s as solo artist, releasing numerous hit albums and touring extensively with his renowned backing band, The Allstars. Like fellow cast member Stevie Wright, much of Young's later success was under the auspices to the famed songwriting-production duo of Harry Vanda and George Young (ex Easybeats). Young scored many Australian hits including the internationally acclaimed "Love is in the Air" and he continues to perform to the present.
- Another accomplished and experienced stage and TV performer prior to Superstar, Reg Livermore succeeded Joseph Dicker as Herod in 1973 and he won immediate acclaim for his flamboyant, irreverent, show-stopping performances and comical ad-libs. He subsequently won even greater acclaim for his powerhouse starring role as the transvestite alien scientist Dr. Frank-N-Furter in the original Australian stage production of The Rocky Horror Show (1974), after which he launched a very successful career performing his series of acclaimed one-man musical shows, including Betty Blokk Buster Follies, Wonder Woman and Sacred Cow, in which he was regularly musical backing by ex-members of the Superstar band, which was renamed The Baxter Funt Orchestra (who also backed singer Jeannie Lewis). Livermore also became a popular lifestyle TV presenter in the 80s and 90s. He remains one of the most popular and respected figures in Australian theatre, and continues to perform featured roles in major stage productions.

== Soundtracks ==
=== Performers ===
- Jon English
- Rory O'Donoghue
- Trevor White
- Michele Fawdon
- Peter North
- Robin Ramsay
- Stevie Wright
- John Young
- Original support cast and chorus

=== Track listing ===
All lyrics are written by Tim Rice; all music is composed by Andrew Lloyd Webber.

Jesus Christ Superstar (Original Australian Cast Recording)
No.	Title	Vocalist(s)	Length
1.	"Heaven on Their Minds"	Jon English	3:54
2.	"Everything's Alright"	Michele Fawdon, English, Trevor White, cast	4:07
3.	"Hosanna"	White	2:24
4.	"Simon Zealotes"	Stevie Wright, cast	3:31
5.	"Poor Jerusalem"	White	1:20
6.	"Pilate's Dream"	Robin Ramsay	2:03
7.	"The Temple"	White, cast	5:08
8.	"I Don’t Know How to Love Him"	Fawdon	4:39
9.	"The Last Supper"	White, English, cast	7:52
10.	"Gethsemane (I Only Want to Say)"	White	6:48
11.	"Could We Start Again Please"	Fawdon, Rory O'Donoghue	2:28
12.	"Trial Before Pilate"	Ramsay, Peter North, White, cast	6:46
13.	"Superstar"	English, cast	4:19
14.	"John 19:41"	instrumental	3:17
Total length:			58:36

=== Charts ===
Chart (1972)	Position
Australia (Kent Music Report)	13

== Australia Cast (1992 release) ==
Jesus Christ Superstar ('92 Australian Cast)

Studio album by John Farnham, Kate Ceberano and Jon Stevens
- Released: 6 July 1992
- Recorded: November 1991−March 1992
- Genres: Passion music, Progressive Rock
- Length: 62:56
- Label: Polygram Records Australia
- Producers: Tim Rice, Andrew Lloyd Webber

John Farnham chronology
Full House (1991)	Jesus Christ Superstar ('92 Australian Cast) (1992)	Then Again (1993)

Kate Ceberano chronology
Think About It! (1991)	Jesus Christ Superstar ('92 Australian Cast) (1992)	Open the Door - Live at Mietta's (1992)

Jon Stevens chronology
Jon Stevens (1982)	Jesus Christ Superstar ('92 Australian Cast) (1992)	Are U Satisfied (1993)

At the ARIA Music Awards of 1993, the album won the ARIA Award for Highest Selling Album and was nominated for Best Original Soundtrack, Cast or Show Album.

=== Performers ===
Cast

- John Farnham - Jesus
- Kate Ceberano - Mary Magdalene
- Jon Stevens - Judas
- Angry Anderson - Herod
- John Waters - Pontius Pilate
- Russell Morris - Simon Zealotes
- Guy Taylor - Annas
- David Gould - Caiaphas
- Musical Director - David Hirschfelder

=== Track listing ===
All lyrics are written by Tim Rice; all music is composed by Andrew Lloyd Webber.

Jesus Christ Superstar (1992 Australian Cast Recording Highlights)
No.	Title	Vocalist(s)	Length
1.	"Overture"		3:53
2.	"Heaven on their Minds"	Jon Stevens	4:28
3.	"What's the Buzz/Strange Thing Mystifying"	John Farnham, Kate Ceberano, Jon Stevens and Ensemble	4:14
4.	"Everything's Alright"	Kate Ceberano, Jon Stevens, John Farnham and Ensemble	4:46
5.	"Hosanna"	David Gould, John Farnham and Ensemble	2:10
6.	"Simon Zealotes/Poor Jerusalem"	Russell Morris, John Farnham and Ensemble	5:13
7.	"Pilate's Dream"	John Waters	1:38
8.	"The Temple"	John Farnham and Ensemble	4:37
9.	"Everythings Alright (Reprise)/I Don’t Know How to Love Him"	Kate Ceberano and John Farnham/Kate Ceberano	4:23
10.	"The Last Supper"	John Farnham, Jon Stevens and Ensemble	7:03
11.	"Gethsemane (I Only Want to Say)"	John Farnham	5:43
12.	"King Herod's Song"	Angry Anderson	3:16
13.	"Trial Before Pilate (Including the 39 Lashes)"	John Waters, David Gould, John Farnham and Ensemble	5:12
14.	"Superstar"	Jon Stevens and Ensemble	4:41
15.	"John 19:41"	instrumental	2:24

=== Chart performance ===
"Jesus Christ Superstar ('92 Australian Cast)" debuted at #1 in Australia and remained at #1 for 10 weeks.

Chart (1992)	Peak position
ARIA Albums Chart	1

Chart (1992)	Position
ARIA End of Year Albums Chart	1

=== Certifications ===
Region	Certification	Certified units/sales
Australia (ARIA)	4× Platinum	280,000^{^}
^{^} Shipments figures based on certification alone.

== 2018 live release ==
On 4 May 2018, Aztec Records released an audio 2-CD set of a complete performance of Jesus Christ Superstar, recorded live at the Capitol Theatre in Sydney in December 1973. Unlike the studio recording, which had been released as a single LP in 1972, this recording contains the entire score of the rock opera. By this point in the production several of the original featured cast had left and been succeeded by other performers - Hines had replaced Fawdon as Mary Magdelene, Livermore had replaced Dicker as Herod, Tony Rose had replaced Ramsay as Pilate, and Wayne Matthews had replaced O'Donoghue as Peter. The recording is also significant for capturing Livermore's last performance as Herod before leaving the production (to be replaced by Jon Finlayson).

The original 4-track source recording was made and preserved by cast member Peter Chambers, who performed various chorus roles during the run of the show, as well as understudying both White and English.
