= Rory O'Donoghue =

Australian actor and musician (1949–2017)

- Born: 13 May 1949; London, England
- Died: 13 December 2017 (aged 68); Sydney, New South Wales, Australia
- Citizenship: Australian
- Occupations: Actor; comedian; composer; musician
- Television: The Aunty Jack Show

Rory O'Donoghue (13 May 1949 – 13 December 2017) was an Australian actor, composer and musician, best known for playing the character "Thin Arthur" in the 1970s ABC Television sketch comedy series The Aunty Jack Show, and for playing the guitar solo on Kevin Johnson's biggest hit "Rock 'N' Roll (I Gave You the Best Years of My Life)". The Aunty Jack Show featured O'Donoghue's long-time creative partner Grahame Bond as the title character.

== Early life ==
Born in London, O'Donoghue came from a theatrical and musical family—his parents were both involved with opera. He moved to Australia and began playing guitar when he was seven years old, and was soon proficient enough to appear on the Coca-Cola Bottler's Club Radio Show playing skiffle music. He was also a professional child actor, scoring roles in Oliver! at twelve and then The Sound of Music a year or so later.

== Career ==
=== The Pogs and The Group ===
In his mid-teens O'Donoghue joined a band on lead guitar and vocals. They became known as The Pogs and became popular on the wealthy North Shore party circuit. The Pogs also played university architecture revues where they met Peter Best, who would help score them a record deal with Festival Records subsidiary label Leedon Records. Best wrote and produced the band's four singles with Leedon over 1966–67, the pick of which was the off-the-wall "The Pogs' Theme". The Pogs had a few lineup changes and gradually evolved into the psychedelic band Oak Apple Day who released one single on the Philips label in 1969 before breaking up in 1970.

In 1971 - just as his fame was burgeoning as part of a team with Grahame Bond - O'Donoghue was an occasional guest on the sitcom The Group playing a hippie musician called 'Rory'. O'Donoghue also composed and sang the show's music, including its closing theme.

=== Work with Grahame Bond ===
Rory met his lifelong creative partner Grahame Bond at age 17. In 1967, O'Donoghue was a cartographer, the two collaborated on the University of Sydney student theatre revue The Great Wall of Porridge, for which the 17-year-old O'Donoghue acted as musical director. It was a profitable success and was performed in a theatre off the University campus, with the funds reportedly paying for a parquetry floor in the Sydney University architecture students' common room.

Rory's work on the university revues led to many further collaborations with members of the revue team including writer-actor-musician Grahame Bond, writer Geoffrey Atherden, future producer-director Maurice Murphy and future film director Peter Weir. The success the Architecture Revues led to a professional stage revue for the PACT Theatre Company, Balloon Dubloon (1969) with Peter Weir, which in turn led to an invitation from festival director Sir Robert Helpmann to stage a revue, Drip Dry Dreams at the Adelaide Festival and Richbrooke. During 1970 this team created and performed the revue Filth at the Phillip St Revue, followed by Hamlet On Ice at the Nimrod Theatre. Bond's friendship with Weir led to him and Rory co-writing the music for Weir's segment of the three-part AFI Award-winning 1970 film Three To Go (in which Bond also had an acting role). Bond also provided the music and played a leading role in Weir's first film, the 1971 short feature Homesdale.

Grahame and Rory soon formed a close partnership and collaborated on numerous theatre, radio and TV projects. Their first joint TV credit was the Christmas-themed comedy-fantasy special Man on a Green Bike (1969). This was followed by the one-off TV comedy program Aunty Jack's Travelling Show (1971), which screened as an episode of the ABC's anthology series The Comedy Game. This episode led to the commissioning of a short series of six programs for the ABC under the aegis of producer Maurice Murphy. The immediate success of this series - the groundbreaking Australian sketch comedy The Aunty Jack Show (1972–73) - catapulted Bond and O'Donoghue to national prominence.

=== The Aunty Jack Show ===
In Season One, Grahame ("Aunty Jack") and Rory ("Thin Arthur") co-starred with actors Sandra MacGregor and John Derum (respectively playing the recurring characters "Flange Desire" and "Narrator Neville"). The four lead actors played the roles of Aunty Jack and her sidekicks in a series of sketches and link pieces, as well as playing many other unrelated characters. Derum left the show after Season 1 to pursue other work and he was replaced for Season 2 by actor-comedian-musician Garry McDonald ("Kid Eager"). McDonald subsequently enjoyed enormous solo success as Norman Gunston, an awkward and charmless regional TV presenter (created by series writer Wendy Skelcher) who made a brief first appearance in a Season 2 episode of Aunty Jack. In collaboration with writer Geoffrey Atherden, McDonald took the character to national stardom in Australia in the late 1970s.

Rory's biggest popular music success was the singer and co-composer (with Grahame) on the Aunty Jack Show closing theme, "Farewell Aunty Jack" which was released as a single (and Australia's first picture-disc) in 1974; it became an Australian No. 1 hit single for three weeks.

During this hectic period O'Donoghue collaborated on a string of ventures with Bond, both on and off-screen, and also worked on projects outside their long-running partnership. Concurrent with his work in Aunty Jack in 1972, O'Donoghue had a regular featured role (as the apostle Peter) in the original Australian stage production of Jesus Christ Superstar (1972) – a production he and Grahame also sent up in the Aunty Jack sketch "Tarzan Super-Ape" (a musical parody of 'Superstar' billed as a "five-minute origami rock opera"). He and Bond also formed an award-winning advertising partnership for which they jointly composed many successful jingles, including a popular animated advertisement for Kentucky Fried Chicken. Rory's other musical credits in this period included playing the lead guitar solo on the hit 1974 Kevin Johnson single "Rock 'N' Roll (I Gave You the Best Years of My Life)" and session contributions to an album by renowned jazz/folk performer Margret RoadKnight.

Bond and O'Donoghue co-starred and collaborated extensively on performance, sketch writing and music for The Aunty Jack Show and its various spin-offs. These included a mini-series of four 50-minute specials under the umbrella title Wollongong the Brave (1974), which explored the stories of some of the minor characters from Aunty Jack, including Norman Gunston. This was followed by the historical parody bushranger comedy series Flash Nick from Jindavik (1974). By the end of Season 2 Bond had tired of Aunty Jack and felt increasingly trapped by the character so he officially killed her off in the final Aunty Jack episode. However he, O'Donoghue and McDonald reunited to reprise their roles as Thin Arthur, Aunty Jack, and Kid Eager for a five-minute TV special Aunty Jack Introduces Colour, which was broadcast just before midnight on 1 March 1975, to mark the ABC's official transition to colour TV broadcasting.

In 2005 Rory and Grahame reunited and revived Aunty Jack and Thin Arthur for a short national tour to promote the release of the DVDs of The Aunty Jack Show and Wollongong The Brave. In 2006 the Aunty Jack Sings Wollongong album was remastered and reissued with bonus material as a 2-CD set.

=== Other television work ===
Later in 1975 the trio began work on their final series for the ABC, but the first episode of The Off Show (1975) was famously pulled from the ABC schedule just before it was due to go to air. According to Bond, an ABC executive objected so vehemently to the sketch "Leave It To Jesus" (a religiously-themed parody of the 1950s American sitcom Leave It to Beaver) that he reportedly seized the master tape of the episode and erased it just before it was scheduled to be broadcast. Ensuing controversy over the supposedly sacrilegious nature of the program soon led to the cancellation of the series. This marked the end of Bond and O'Donoghue's successful and influential tenure at ABC-TV, and their fruitful TV collaborations with producers Maurice Murphy and Ted Robinson, although the duo would later work with Murphy on his first film.

Grahame and Rory's unhappiness with their treatment by the ABC led to their estrangement from the network; after a final short-lived TV series - The Of Show (directed by Ric Birch of Olympic Ceremonies and other major event fame... a reworking of the ill-fated Off Show) the duo severed their relationship with the ABC for many years and Bond did not appear on the network again until the late 1980s. The tension between the parties was further exacerbated by persistent rumours that the ABC had erased all or major parts of the master tapes of the duo's various Aunty Jack-era projects. Although some material was known to have survived (including a one-hour special culled from the series for British TV) it was never re-screened - due to the large amount of original music they composed for these projects, Bond and O'Donoghue (as the copyright owners) for many years refused permission for the ABC to re-broadcast any of the surviving material.

It was not until the early 2000s, and the rediscovery of a trove of archival material from the Aunty Jack years, that Bond and O'Donoghue and the ABC effected a rapprochement, which led to the complete restoration of both The Aunty Jack Show and Wollongong the Brave and their subsequent release on DVD. Although these two programs were fully restored for DVD (including previously unseen colour footage), it is believed that the master tapes of Flash Nick From Jindavik did not survive and that some or all of the series was erased by the ABC in the late 1970s as part of an internal economy drive. Likewise it is believed that only fragments of The Off Show have survived.

=== Music and theatre ===
Following the success of The Aunty Jack Show, the team undertook a national concert tour on which they were backed by an all-star group that included members of the 'Superstar' house band, and guest vocalist Stevie Wright, former lead singer of The Easybeats, with whom O'Donoghue had worked in 'Superstar'. The short-lived 'supergroup' assembled for the tour also recorded a live-in-the-studio concert for the ABC entitled "Aunty Jack & The Gong in Bloody Concert!", which became the third episode of Wollongong the Brave, and the success of the single enabled Grahame, Rory, Garry and their backing musicians to record a successful comedy LP, Aunty Jack Sings Wollongong, which included musical excerpts originally recorded for the Aunty Jack shows, interspersed with newly recorded music and sketches. During 1975 the trio also collaborated for several months on a weekly free-form Sunday afternoon radio comedy program called "Nude Radio", which was broadcast on the ABC's newly established AM rock radio station Double Jay (2JJ), which at that point was only heard in Sydney and environs. Some off-air listener recordings of this show are known to exist but it is not known whether any official recordings of this program have survived.

Bond and O'Donoghue wrote the music for a pantomime Hamlet on Ice, which premiered at the Nimrod Theatre. Its 1975 revival was described as "a jest at Shakespeare's Hamlet and Australian manhood among other things".

During the late 1970s and early 1980s O'Donoghue continued to collaborate with Bond on their advertising work, and they enjoyed renewed success on the stage with another Shakespeare parody - the popular production Boys Own McBeth, a musical send-up of the Shakespeare play, set in a private boys' school, which toured nationally around Australia to considerable acclaim.

=== Other work ===
Rory composed the music for the TV movie Cass (1978), and the documentary short The Aluminium Age (1979). In 1980 he and Bond collaborated on the score for the Australian movie Fatty Finn, directed by their former ABC colleague Maurice Murphy, and for which Rory won the AFI Award for best music. In the late 1980s Rory composed and performed the theme and incidental music for the popular ABC-TV series Bush Tucker Man and in 1992 he wrote the music for the documentary Photographers of Australia: Dupain, Sievers, Moore.

In his later career, O'Donoghue moved into music teaching and enjoyed a long and distinguished career as a music teacher and band leader, working at several of Sydney's most prestigious private girls' schools, including Abbotsleigh.

On 18 November 2012, Rory performed a one-man show at Parramatta's Riverside Theatre. It was a collection of anecdotes and songs from his professional life. Attendees included his family and friends Graeme Bond and Doug Mulray.

== Sporting performances ==
Later in life, O'Donoghue participated in long-distance endurance events, particularly triathlon, including:

- Cairns Ironman, finishing in 2014 and 2015, with at least one DNF due to poor conditions (known PB 13:46 = 13h46m). In 2012 Rory pulled out 70 km into the bike leg due to hypothermia and in 2013 was a DNS due to a heavy headcold
- Sydney's Curl Curl parkrun, completing the 5k course at least 45 times between 2014 and 2017 (known PB of 23:03 on 12 September 2015)
- Huski Long Course triathlon in Huskisson, completing at least 5 times between 2008 and 2016 (known PB 5:50)
- Nepean Triathlon in Penrith, completing at least 7 times between 2004 and 2016 (known PB 2:10)
- Sydney Morning Herald Half Marathon, completing at least 5 times between 2008 and 2014 (known PB 1:44)
- the City To Surf 14 km fun run, completing at least 8 times between 2005 and 2014 (known PB 69:01)
- Canberra Ironman 70.3 completing at least 3 times between 2005 and 2012 (known PB 6:21)

He completed one 45 km Six Foot Track marathon in Katoomba NSW in 2007 in 6:52 and one Port Macquarie Ironman in 2009 in 14:08.

O'Donoghue proudly represented Australia in the World Duathlon Championships in Adelaide. On 17 October 2015 his result for the event was 1:19:53.

He was an enthusiastic participant in Abbotsleigh's senior school cross country races where teachers are encouraged to take part.

O'Donoghue was a member of the Warringah Triathlon Club from 2013 to 2017. He was renowned for performing at the annual awards night. His best performance in the club handicap points score was 23rd (of 158) in the 2014/15 season. He seldom rode with the WTC training group, preferring to ride his Cervélo on his bike trainer set up outside his house in Davidson and later in Manly.

== Death ==
On 15 December 2017, O'Donoghue's daughter Jessica announced on Facebook that he had died on 13 December. In a follow-up post the next day, she stated that he had been undergoing treatment for depression and mental illness, and had taken his own life in hospital. O'Donoghue's The Aunty Jack Show co-star Grahame Bond said none of the cast members knew about his illness for over 30 years.

== Awards ==
Bond and O'Donoghue won an Australian Film Institute award in 1981 for best movie score for the music of the film Fatty Finn. O'Donoghue also wrote music for advertisements.
