= News Free Zone =

Australian television series

- Genre: Comedy
- Created by: Maurice Murphy
- Starring: Grahame Bond
- Country of origin: Australia
- Original language: English
- No. of seasons: 1
- No. of episodes: 50

Production
- Running time: 30 minutes

Original release
- Release: 29 July 1985 – 1985

Related
- Aunty Jack Show

News Free Zone is a 1985 Australian TV comedy show starring Grahame Bond. It was the idea of Maurice Murphy.

== Premise ==
It was intended to be an entire evening's entertainment in one half hour with no news (shown at 6pm, the same time the three commercial networks showed their evening news). It screened daily.

The regular segments included:

- a sitcom called Australia Street about a sharehouse at 85 Australia Street with a different resident from each state
- a game show Neverending Story
- a one-person soap opera Party Line
- Kev Kevanagh's Kulture
- World Championship Acting
- Vintage Video which showed old sketches from Aunty Jack
- a reading at the end from The Book Of Wisdom
- Bond singing "Please Respect Me"

== Cast ==
- Grahame Bond as Kev Kevanagh
- Wendy Patching as Self
- Rory O'Donoghue
- Garry McDonald
- Robyn Moase
- John Derum
- John Bluthal
- Jude Kuring
- Neil Redfern
- Val Langford
- Sandra MacGregor
- Doug Scroope

== Production ==
Murphy says the program was based on his "absolute hatred of anything journalistic and philosophical" and an "absolute love of enjoyment and fun and the light side in life". He says it was based on his "personal attention span. Some programs have one minute of plot and 27 minutes of fill in. I've always wondered why we just didn't have the minute and forget about the other 27 minutes."

Apart from Grahame Bond, there are no well-known faces in the cast. "The aim is to try and develop a program that doesn't have to come off," said Murphy. "The idea is just to have I fun. I hope News Free Zone builds up new faces."

It was filmed in Adelaide. The series ran on every weekday for ten weeks.

== Reception ==
The show was the lead-in for the new ABC news program The National. Ratings were poor.
