= Aunty Jack Sings Wollongong =

Studio album by Aunty Jack
- Released: November 1974
- Recorded: 1974
- Genre: Comedy
- Length: 50:05
- Label: Warner Music Australia
- Producers: Grahame Bond, Rory O'Donoghue, Maurice Murphy

Aunty Jack Sings Wollongong is an Australian album released in November 1974 as a spin-off from the cult ABC Television show Aunty Jack. It contains a mixture of songs and sketches and, along with the single "Farewell Aunty Jack", is the only audio release from the Aunty Jack crew.

== Track listing ==
The album follows the format of the Aunty Jack show - sketches with the main characters Aunty Jack, Thin Arthur, Kid Eager and Flange Desire (although Flange is almost completely absent from the album sketches) interspersed with sketches with other characters. According to the album notes "The Album was conceived as an aural/visual experience; a TV Show on record; sound with pictures. From a day trip to Wollongong to Spider Farrelly's Bucks Party. Settle back, close your eyes and be transported to a day in the life of Aunty Jack with Thin Arthur and Kid Eager."

Side one starts off with a jokes dating back to the days of vinyl records. Aunty Jack gets "pronged" by the needle, Kid Eager falls down the hole in the centre of the album and Aunty Jack with Thin Arthur get chased by the needle. After the first song they wind up in Wollongong, in the Gong A Go Go club where Norman Gunston introduces the Farrelly Brothers, who sing I've Been Everywhere, except the only place they have been is Wollongong and Dapto. Norman Gunston spots Aunty Jack in the audience, and starts to introduce her, but Kid Eager jumps in instead with a dance. Aunty Jack steps in, and introduces her dance. Mervyn Whipple, Man of a Thousand Faces then jumps in with his omni directional sound effects act. The scene then shifts to a park bench with Neil and Errol who sing a song where they have to avoid rhymes. Eventually Neil makes a rhyme, and Errol is thus set free. The scene shifts again to Kev Kavanagh and the Kavemen at the Abattoirs Discothèque (which he pronounces "dis-COTH-e-kew"). Somehow after their song, we are back at the Gong a Go Go, where Norman Gunston thanks Kev for his act and takes us into Wollongong's national anthem "Wollongong The Brave". The cast join in, but find it hard to stop as someone (usually Norman Gunston) keeps the song going. Bit by bit everyone departs, leaving eventually only Norman, who refuses to end it, until it is pointed out everyone is going to the other side of the record. He still continues, and gets bombed.

Side two begins with Norman Gunston still singing "Wollongong The Brave", until Aunty Jack shuts him up, and the theme from Aunty Jack plays. We then are transported to Spider Farrelly's Bucks Party with his steel-worker mates - during their lunch break - who are entertained by the Ri Fol Tit Men. The duo sing three songs accompanied by a harpsichord until they are shouted off by the steel workers for their foul language (which is only of "poo, bum, wee" grade). The next act is the stripper, but it turns out to be Aunty Jack. Norman Gunston on the radio interrupts with one of his "What's On In Wollongong" segments, introducing the Farrelly Brothers who sing a Bush Ballad that sounds suspiciously more Hawaiian than Australian, due no doubt to the dangerous substance they inhaled. This is followed by Tarzan Super Ape, a rock opera in the style of Jesus Christ Superstar. Back at the steelworkers' canteen an ad is read for Fish Milk Shakes. The Farrelly Brothers return with some Country and Western Suburbs music. Aunty Jack and her band The Gongs sing a song with Flange Desire showing her limited skills in a keyboard solo. The now audibly drunk steelworkers stand, face Nor-North West, and watch the Aunty Jack show. As the final song ends, Aunty Jack et al. get squashed by the next record. Aunty Jack climbs up to intervene and winds up jamming with the legendary Japanese blues star Blind Josh Orange Drop Mitsubishi and his side-man harp player Muddy Mahawat.

Cover of the 2006 re-issue, featuring the main characters in an old fashioned lounge room with a fireplace and jukebox

=== Side One ===
1. "Rip Off" (Aunty Jack and Thin Arthur) – 2:57
2. "I've Been Everywhere" (The Farrelly Brothers) – 2:39
3. "The Kid Eager" (Kid Eager 'n' The Gong) – 1:40
4. "Doin' The Aunty Jack" (Aunty Jack 'n' The Gong) – 1:50
5. "Man Of 1000 Faces" (Mervyn Whipple & Sampson) – 0:46
6. "The Last Refrain" (Neil and Errol) – 3:14
7. "Veggie Queen" (Kev Kavanagh & the Kavemen) – 3:02
8. "Wollongong The Brave" (Norman & The Gunstonnettes) – 6:30

=== Side Two ===
1. "Wollongong The Brave (reprise)" (Norman Gunston) – 0:13
2. "Head Of The Pack" (Thin Arthur) – 0:57
3. "Spider's Bucks Lunch" (Len, Ron & Darryl) – 1:00
4. "Ri Fol Tit Men" (Ri Fol Tit Men) – 2:41
5. "Don't Take It Off" (Thin Arthur) – 0:26
6. "What's On In Wollongong" (Norman Gunston) – 0:28
7. "Snowy Aloha" (The 'Banjo' Farrelly Brothers) – 1:42
8. "Tarzan Super Ape" (an Origami Rock Opera) – 5:52
9. "Fish Milk Shakes" (Terry Dutton) – 0:52
10. "The Western Lady" (The Farrelly Brothers) – 1:59
11. "Aunty Jack 'N' The Box" (Aunty Jack 'n' The Gong) – 5:37
12. "Farewell Aunty Jack" (Thin Arthur & Aunty Jack) – 1:54
13. "Nagasaki Blues" (Blind Josh Orange Drop Mitsubishi & Muddy Mahawat, with Aunty Jack) – 3:21

"Head Of The Pack" was used as the opening theme music on the Aunty Jack show, and "Farewell, Aunty Jack" is taken from the closing credits.

"Farewell Aunty Jack" and "Doin' The Aunty Jack" are different versions than appear on the single.

"Tarzan Super Ape" was recorded for use in the Aunty Jack show, series one. John Derum normally played the character Narrator Neville, but left at the end of the first series, being replaced by Garry McDonald.

The original 1974 release is now a collector's item as it is highly difficult to find.

=== 2006 Re-Issue ===
In 2006, the album was re-released on compact disc, as a 2 disc set. Disc one is both sides of the original album, and disc two is a compilation of the Farewell Aunty Jack single, as well as songs used in the Aunty Jack series, Flash Nick From Jindavik, the Off Show, and News Free Zone.

1. "Farewell Aunty Jack" (single version)
2. "Doin' The Aunty Jack" (B-side to "Farewell Aunty Jack")
3. "Wollongong On The Mind"
4. "Pearl Pureheart"
5. "Be-Bop-a-Lula"
6. "A Football Opera"
7. "Dear Scarlett"
8. "Herman The Brave"
9. "Teenage Butcher"
10. "Do The Kev"
11. "La Kookaracha"
12. "Honalulu Lulu"
13. "Norman Gunston's Second Dream"
14. "You're Ugly"
15. "Flash Nick From Jindavik"
16. "Ride Riley Ride"
17. "Off Show Theme"
18. "Leave It To Jesus"
19. "Away In A Major"
20. "Budgie Pizza"
21. "Queen Of The Gong"
22. "Greenhouse Blues"
23. "News Free Zone"
24. "Please Respect Me"

"Leave It To Jesus" is the opening theme to the sketch of the same name, a lampoon of Leave It to Beaver, which was to appear on an early episode of The Off Show - before an ABC-TV executive erased it on the night before it was due to be broadcast. It was this incident that led to Bond and O'Donoghue ending their association with ABC-TV for several years.

"News Free Zone" was broadcast in 1985 on ABC-TV, intended to be an entire evening's entertainment in one half-hour with no news (shown at the same time the three commercial networks showed their evening news) - a sitcom (85 Australia Street), a game show (Neverending Story), and a soap opera (Party Line which always started with a voice over saying "A wise man once said..."), along with Kev Kevanagh's Kulture, and Vintage Video which showed old Aunty Jack sketches. The show ended each night with a reading from The Book Of Wisdom, usually a vague saying of doubtful value, before Bond sang "Please Respect Me". Bond and O'Donoghue recreate this at the end of the second disc.

== Charts ==
| Chart (1974/75) | Peak position |
|---|---|
| Australia (Kent Music Report) | 39 |

== Main Performers ==
- Grahame Bond - Aunty Jack, Farrelly Brother, Errol, Kev Kavanagh, Len, Ri Fol Tit man, Tarzan, Terry Dutton
- Rory O'Donoghue - Thin Arthur, Farrelly Brother, Neil, Ri Fol Tit man, Witch Doctor
- Garry McDonald - Kid Eager, Norman Gunston
- Maggie McKinney - Jane, Flange Desire
- John Derum - Bomba The Jungle Boy

== Credits ==
- Music produced by Graham Bond / Rory O'Donoghue
- Dialogue produce by Maurice Murphy
- Engineer Wahanui 'Wyn' Wynyard
- Studios United Sound
- Synthesisers supplied and built by Kim Ryrie (later of Fairlight)
- Union Delegate Spider Farrelly

"The album was recorded in 1974, sometime."

== See also ==
- The Aunty Jack Show
  - Aunty Jack Introduces Colour
  - Farewell Aunty Jack
  - Wollongong the Brave
