= The Pogs =

Australian beat music group

The Pogs or "Poggies" as they are sometimes referred to, were an Australian beat music group who were active from 1965 to 1967. They comprised Rory O'Donoghue (vocals, lead guitar), Rocco Bellantonio (rhythm guitar), Nino Bellantonio (bass guitar) and Paul Brownlow (drums).

== Band background ==
The band was popular on the wealthy North Shore party circuit in Sydney and also played university architecture revues. It was at one of these revues that they met songwriter producer Peter Best who helped score the band a recording deal with Festival Records subsidiary label Leedon Records. They recorded their debut single, Claret and Tears b/w Heidi, in mid-1966. Both sides were composed and produced by Best (as were the A and B sides of all four of the band's singles). None of the band's four singles made the charts however, and in 1967 they were dropped by Leedon. The Pogs did make one further curio however – "Aboriginal Referendum Jingle (Vote Yes for Aborigines)" a tune in support of the "Yes" vote for the 1967 Australian referendum, also penned by Best.

In 1967, the Pogs recruited organist Graeme Thompson and lost bassist Nino (who went on to further his architectural career). Thompson was then drafted into the Australian Army and was replaced by Bruce Hadden. Drummer Paul Brownlow also left to concentrate on his electrical business and he was replaced by Greg "Max" MacManus. The band also changed their name to Oak Apple Day (sometimes spelled Oakapple Day) and went into a more psychedelic rock direction, influenced by bands such as The Doors. Oak Apple Day continued performing in university revues, even touring with them professionally, and it was there that Rory O'Donoghue first collaborated with future Aunty Jack Show co-star Grahame Bond.

Oak Apple Day made one single, with the Philips Records label in 1969 – a cover of the Traffic song "No Name, No Face", No Number backed with an original number by Rocco Bellantonio (though credited to Laurie Baker on the single label) named Oceans of Fire. An intense, organ driven psychedelic, almost early progressive rock track with a particularly fine vocal performance by Rory O'Donoghue. O'Donoghue was also booked as a session singer for a single entitled "Moonshot" (released in July 1969, obviously to coincide with the Apollo 11 Moon landing), which was a crazy, fun, psychedelic workout replete with spacey sound effects and corny control tower instructions ("All systems A-OK!"... "Trajectory A-OK!"). The single was written by the duo Bannerman-Stokes on the RCA label under the name Oak Apple Day with The Deadly Pair and it has distinction of being one of the first 45 rpm singles in Australia to be issued in stereo. Stereo singles would not become commonplace in Australia until 1971.

Oak Apple Day broke up in 1970 and Rory went on to play jazz before joining The If who performed The Who’s rock opera Tommy at the Elizabethan Theatre in Sydney. He also worked on the musical Jesus Christ Superstar before once again hooking up with Grahame Bond to play “Thin Arthur” in the hit ABC TV comedy Aunty Jack. Running for two series in the early 1970s the show produced a couple of singles and an album including compositions from Peter Best.

== Discography ==
The Pogs:

- "Claret and Tears" / "Heidi" (Leedon LK-1372), June 1966
- "Now That It’s Over" / "Hey Miss Thompson" (Leedon LK-1494), October 1966
- "I’ll Never Love Again" / "The Pogs' Theme" (Leedon LK-1566), January 1967
- "Scenes From an Affair" / "Goodnight, But Not Goodbye" (Leedon LK-1838), August 1967
- "Oak Apple Day" (with the Deadly Pair):
- "Moonshot"/ "Let’s Do it on the Moon" (RCA 101864), July 1969

Oak Apple Day:

- "No Face, No Name, No Number" / "Oceans of Fire" (Philips BF-449), September 1969

All eight sides of the Pogs' singles (plus the Aboriginal Referendum jingle) are included on the compilation CD I Want, Need, Love You!: Garage-Beat Nuggets from the Festival Vaults (Playback Records: PBCD-001, 2016)
