= 15 Amore =

- DVD cover
- Directed by: Maurice Murphy
- Written by: Maurice Murphy
- Starring: Lisa Hensley; Steve Bastoni
- Release dates: September 1998 (Aspen Film Festival); 2000 (Australia)
- Country: Australia
- Language: English
- Box office: A$16,831 (Australia)

15 Amore is a 1998 Australian film directed by Maurice Murphy and starring Lisa Hensley and Steve Bastoni.

== Cast ==
- Lisa Hensley as Dorothy
- Steve Bastoni as Alfredo
- Domenic Galati as Joseph
- Tara Jakszewicz as Rachel
- Gertraud Ingeborg as Madame Guttman
- Rhiana Griffith as Mercia
- Joel Pieterse as Denis
- Nicholas Bryant as Brendan
- Bill Hunter as present-day Brendan (narrator)

== Plot ==
In WWII Australia, Dorothy and her three little children have a small farm in the Mount Macedon area of Victoria. Nothing has been heard of their father, Dorothy's husband, who was a soldier before the war and one of the first to volunteer.

Italian POWs Alfredo and Joseph are billeted with Dorothy, ostensibly as farmhands but treated more like family members or arms-length friends. As the film opens they are acting as ballboys while Dorothy practices tennis strokes. A pair of soldiers regularly check that the prisoners haven't escaped – a farcical procedure, as all four are happy with the status quo.

Domestic arrangements are overturned when Dorothy is expected to host a pair of Jewish German refugees: Frau Guttman and her shy daughter Rachel. The daughter is pleased to be there and eager to fit in, but the Frau, who is proud of her pre-war wealth and status, cannot reconcile herself to the place or the culture. Denis, the curly-haired son, around whom much of the action is centred, attempts to befriend her but is rebuffed.

There is a mutual attraction between Alfredo and Dorothy, and it grows steadily, but loyalty to their distant spouses holds them apart; meanwhile a secret romance develops between Joseph and Rachel, who may be below the age of consent. At the next visit of the Army officials, Frau Guttman makes vague accusations against the Italians: she may have witnessed some illicit sexual activity but refuses to give names. Eventually Alfredo defuses the situation by (falsely) confessing, thereby leaving open the possibility of Joseph's eventual return.

In the last scene, the war is over. The father returns as the Italians are taken away for repatriation. He is barely noticed, as Joseph and Alfredo are tearfully farewelled.

== Release ==
The film was screened at the Aspen Film Festival in September 1998.

== Accolades ==
The film received four nominations at the 2000 Australian Film Institute Awards, including for Best Actor for Steve Bastoni.
