= Farewell Aunty Jack =

Single by Grahame Bond

from the album Aunty Jack Sings Wollongong
- B-side: "Doin' the Aunty Jack"
- Released: December 1973
- Studio: ATA Studios, Sydney
- Genre: Pop
- Length: 3:24
- Label: Polydor
- Songwriters: Rory O'Donoghue; Grahame Bond
- Producers: Grahame Bond; Rory O'Donoghue

"Farewell Aunty Jack" is the closing theme to The Aunty Jack Show, played at the end of each episode. It was re-recorded and released as a hit single in late 1973 and spent 3 weeks at number one in the charts in Australia in February and March 1974.

The music was written by Rory O'Donoghue, who also did the singing as the character "Thin Arthur", whereas "Aunty Jack" (Grahame Bond) provided wise-cracks and other spoken commentary to the lyrics, addressed to the listener and the singer.

The single had Aunty Jack demanding that listeners listen to this song real close, because I tell you what, if you don't I'm gonna jump through your speakers and rip yer bloody arms off, whereas on the TV show, Aunty Jack threatened to jump through the television screen and rip yer bloody arms off, if viewers didn't watch the show the following week.

The 7" single was released on Polydor Records together with a 7" picture disc edition of the single, making this one of the first Australian 7" picture discs. This version has a listed play time of 3:24. The 'B' side recording was "Doin' the Aunty Jack", with a listed play time of 2:10.

== Charts ==
=== Weekly charts ===
Chart (1974)	Peak position
Australia (Kent Music Report)	1
New Zealand (Listener)	14

=== Year-end charts ===
Chart (1974)	Peak position
Australia (Kent Music Report)	6

== See also ==
- The Aunty Jack Show
  - Aunty Jack Introduces Colour
  - Aunty Jack Sings Wollongong
  - Wollongong the Brave
