= The Garry McDonald Show =

Television show

The Garry McDonald Show is a 1977 Australian sketch show for television. It was shot in Gore Hill, Sydney for the ABC. Its writers included Morris Gleitzman, Tim Gooding, Johanna Pigott (credited as Johanna Piggott), Angela Webber, Paul Leadon, David Poltorak, John Sweetensen, Peter Thorburn, Rob George and Steve J. Spears (credited as Steve Spears). John Eastway was the producer and director. Although publicity for the show initially promised it would run for ten episodes, only eight were screened.

Whereas McDonald's previous hit, The Norman Gunston Show was a satire of Australian media and light entertainment, The Garry McDonald Show was a showcase for McDonald's skills as a mimic, parodying popular television stars of the time such as Harry Butler, Graham Kennedy and Ugly Dave Gray, as well as creating comedic scenarios such as Marshall Marceau, a police procedural starring McDonald as Marcel Marceau. McDonald also appeared in some sketches as Mo McCackie: he had recently starred in the Nimrod theatre's production of Steve J. Spears' play Young Mo. Every episode began with McDonald addressing a studio audience as himself, with awkward and seemingly un- or under-rehearsed banter. While some segments were performed before the audience, many were pre-filmed outside the studio.

Although Norman Gunston was not prominent in The Garry McDonald Show, he does appear in some episodes, for instance 'Outer Suburbs Connection' in episode 2, an expose of ancient extraterrestrial influence in present-day Australia. He is also the musical guest at least twice – once with a rendition of 'I Go To Rio' and once with 'Love Me Tender'.

Many episodes had a 'straight' music segment, including non-comedic contributions by McDonald himself on harmonica; in episode 5, he contributes a harmonica solo to Cheetah's rendition of 'Help Is On Its Way'.

The show was ambitious and, it is to be assumed, expensive with a large cast and many elaborate sets. One running joke was that each episode began with the viewer seeing behind the scenes in the studio where amongst other performers never seen in the actual show, an elephant was waiting to appear. The elephant provided a punchline in the final episode when it proved to be the only cast member willing to celebrate with McDonald at the conclusion of the series.

Some featured performers, obscure at this time, would go on to distinction. Johanna Pigott, for instance, who not only wrote for but also acted in the series, would soon become a well-known songwriter and performer. She and Gooding created the 1984 hit series Sweet and Sour. A 12-year-old Amanda Brown is one of three ballerinas in the second episode.

The show did not resile from commentaries on race or religion. The third episode in the series included an extended sketch revolving around an indigenous superstar, 'Blind Boy Jacky Jacky', played by McDonald in blackface; it was arguably intended as a commentary on Aboriginal disadvantage. One writer for Melbourne's The Age described the segment as 'sickeningly racist and thoroughly humourless'.

The final episode of the show screened on 15 September 1977, with McDonald joking with the audience that it had been a career setback: 'I hope you'll all come back for my next ABC series. No-one's leaving the country before 1990 are they?'

== Cast ==
- Garry McDonald
- Jude Kuring
- Ron Blanchard
- Sue Walker
- Ric Hutton
- Anne-Louise Lambert (as Anne Lambert)
- Marianne Howard
- Kashel Robertson-Swann (as Kashell Robertson-Swann)
- Olga Yarad
- Chris Galletti
- David Whitford
