= Exchange Lifeguards =

1992 Australian film

- Directed by: Maurice Murphy
- Written by: Phillip Avalon
- Produced by: Phillip Avalon
- Starring: Christopher Atkins; Julian McMahon; Elliott Gould; Martin Cruden
- Cinematography: Martin McGrath
- Music by: John Capek
- Release date: 21 June 1992
- Country: Australia
- Language: English
- Budget: $1.6 million
- Box office: A$3,634 (Australia)

Exchange Lifeguards, known in the United States as Wet and Wild Summer!, is a 1992 Australian-American comedy film directed by Maurice Murphy and starring Christopher Atkins, Julian McMahon and Elliott Gould.

== Premise ==
A property developer wants to take over an Australian beach for a high rise resort. He sends his son to Australia to check out the situation, posing as an exchange lifeguard. He falls in love with a woman who owns the land his father needs for the development and finds himself sympathising with the locals.

== Cast ==
- Christopher Atkins as Bobby McCain
- Julian McMahon as Mick Dooley
- Rebecca Carlton as Julie Thomas
- Vanessa Steele as Charlene
- Elliott Gould as Mike McCain
- Richard Carter as Al Eastman
- Amanda Newman-Phillips as Kylie
- Christopher Pate as Richard Gray
- Lois Larimore as Donna McCain
- Brian M. Logan as Terry
- Mark Hembrow as Max
- Peter Gow as Tishi
- Anthony Lawrence as Clint Eastman
- Ann Brisk as Annie McCain
- Rick Hochman as himself

== Production ==
Avalon says that sales agent Dick Bateman suggested he write and produce a film set around the beach and lifeguards, with humour and a romance. Bateman said he would buy all rights for $1.5 million. Avalon wrote a script Gary Hamilton of Beyond agreed to help finance if Avalon could get Elliott Gould and Chris Atkins to star; Avalon succeeded in doing this and the film was made for $1.6 million.

== Reception ==
In her review of the film Marsha Porter describes the film as a "vulgar Aussie version of Frankie-and-Annette beach movies" and as "sexist, badly acted, and buffoonish".

== See also ==
- Cinema of Australia
