= Man on a Green Bike =

1969 television film

- Written by: Grahame Bond; Peter Weir
- Directed by: Robert L. Allnutt
- Starring: Grahame Bond; Geoff Malone; John Chance; James Dellit; Anna Nygh
- Music by: Grahame Bond; Rory O'Donoghue
- Country of origin: Australia
- Original language: English

Production
- Running time: 45 minutes

Original release
- Network: ABC
- Release: 28 December 1969

Man on a Green Bike is an Australian 45-minute television film written by and starring Grahame Bond and Peter Weir. It was directed by Robert L. Allnutt. It was screened once, on the ABC on 28 December 1969.

== Story ==
The film sees Mr. Maloon (Geoff Malone) travelling through a series of fantasy landscapes in which he encounters the mayors of three different towns. These are the mediaeval Ackley (the mayor played by Grahame Bond); Cadmium, which exists in the future (Cadmium's mayor is played by Weir) and Petal Lake, a community infused with a 1930s ambience, for which James Dellit plays the mayor. Mr. Maloon escapes from each town in turn and, in the end, each mayor leaves their town to pursue him on their bicycles. He escapes them on a motorcycle.

== Cast ==
- Grahame Bond as Debauchery / Mayor of Ackley
- John Chance as Announcer
- James Dellit as Hollywood / Mayor of Petal Lake
- Geoff Malone (as Geoffrey Malone) as Mr. Maloon
- Anna Nygh as The Woman (Nygh is also credited with choreography)
- Rory O'Donoghue as N/A
- Peter Weir as Technology / Mayor of Cadmium
