= The Aunty Jack Show =

1972–1973 Australian comedy TV series

- Kid Eager, Aunty Jack and Thin Arthur from the cassette cover of Aunty Jack Sings Wollongong (1974) (cassette version)
- Genre: Comedy
- Directed by: Maurice Murphy
- Starring: Grahame Bond; Rory O'Donoghue; Sandra McGregor; John Derum (1972); Garry McDonald (1973)
- Opening theme: "Head of the Pack" (performed by Rory O'Donoghue)
- Ending theme: "Farewell Aunty Jack" (performed by Rory O'Donoghue and Grahame Bond)
- Country of origin: Australia
- Original language: English
- No. of seasons: 2
- No. of episodes: 13 + 2 specials and a pilot

Original release
- Network: ABC
- Release: 15 November 1972 – 29 November 1973

The Aunty Jack Show is a Logie Award-winning Australian television comedy series that ran from 1972 to 1973. Produced by and broadcast on ABC-TV, the series attained an instant cult status that persists to the present day.

The lead character, Aunty Jack was a unique comic creation – obese, moustachioed and gravel-voiced, part trucker and part pantomime dame – who habitually solved any problem by knocking people unconscious or threatening to "rip yer bloody arms off". Visually, she was unmistakable, dressed in a huge, tent-like blue velvet dress, football socks, workboots, and a golden boxing glove on her right hand. She rode a Harley-Davidson motorcycle and referred to everyone as "me little lovelies" – when she was not uttering her familiar threat: "I'll rip yer bloody arms off!", a phrase which immediately passed into the vernacular. The character was devised and played by Grahame Bond and was partly inspired by his overbearing Uncle Jack, whom he had disliked as a child, his grandfather Ben Doyle, and Dot Strong, the ABC's last official tea lady.

== Background ==
Bond was already an accomplished writer, producer, comedian, singer, songwriter and guitarist by the time he graduated with an architecture degree from the University of Sydney. He cut his teeth writing and performing as a founder member and leading light of the university's legendary Architecture Revues from 1964 to 1969. It was here that he met and became friends with other Sydney students including scriptwriter Geoffrey Atherden, television and film director Maurice Murphy and Peter Weir, who would go on to become an internationally acclaimed film director. Through these stage revues Bond also met his longtime musical, writing and acting partner Rory O'Donoghue, who had begun his performing career playing The Artful Dodger in a Sydney production of the musical Oliver! as well as being the lead singer and guitarist in the Sydney rock bands the Pogs and Oakapple Day. O'Donoghue was 14 at the time he met Bond, when The Pogs were brought in to provide musical backing for one of the Architecture Revues.

After graduating, Bond and friends continued working together on a wide range of projects in radio, theatre, TV and film. He collaborated on several short films and stage pieces with Weir, and wrote and played in a number of stage comedies and revues. The success of Bond's work in the Architecture Revues led to a professional stage revue for the PACT Theatre Company, Balloon Dubloon (1969) with Weir, which in turn led to an invitation from festival director Sir Robert Helpmann to stage a revue, Drip Dry Dreams at the Adelaide Festival and Richbrooke.

Through Bob Allnutt, a staffer at the PACT Theatre Company who also worked for the ABC's Religious Affairs Department, Weir, Bond was one of a group of people commissioned to produce a TV special, Man on a Green Bike, a fantasy that examined three different views of Christmas; this screened on ABC-TV at the end of December 1969. The 50-minute film, which is Bond's first known TV appearance, was co-written by and starred Bond and Weir, with Geoff Malone, James Dellit, and Anna Nygh. The story concerned three men, once friends sharing many adventures, who are now mayors of three cities—medieval Ackley, the futuristic Cadmium, and Petal Lake, a community reminiscent of the 1930s. Into their midst comes the strange figure of Mr. Maloon, a man travelling on a heavily laden green bike, whose presence disturbs and embarrasses the mayors.

During 1970, Bond, Weir and co. created and performed the revue Filth at the Phillip St Revue, followed by Hamlet on Ice at the Nimrod Theatre. Bond's friendship with Weir led to him writing the music for the three-part AFI Award-winning 1970 film Three To Go (in which he also had a small acting role), for which Weir directed one segment. Bond also provided the music and played a leading role in Weir's first film, the 1971 short feature Homesdale.

== Origin ==
Aunty Jack was created for a proposed ABC Radio children's radio series, The Aunty Jack Show, commissioned by Paddy Conroy (former head of ABC TV and now cable channel manager). It was intended to replace the long-running children's radio series The Argonauts Club, which was about to be cancelled. The new series did not go to air because ABC executives felt that the Aunty Jack character and some of Bond's songs were "inappropriate" for young listeners.

The Aunty Jack character made her TV debut in Aunty Jack's Travelling Show, an episode of ABC-TV's The Comedy Game, broadcast in late 1971. It was originally to be called Aunty Jack's Travelling Abattoirs but ABC executives objected to the title. The program featured Bond, O'Donoghue and Derum, with Sharman Mellick and Kate Fitzpatrick in supporting roles.

This marked the start of a fruitful partnership between Bond, O'Donoghue and ABC writer, producer and director Maurice Murphy. They became the creative nucleus for a string of programs that strongly influenced TV comedy in Australia.

== Influences ==
Although frequently compared to Monty Python's Flying Circus, as the two teams evidently shared the same love of surreal humour, Aunty Jack had existed conceptually before Bond or other show creators had seen Monty Python. Indeed, Aunty Jack's television debut took place an hour and a half before the British show was first screened in Australia on 30 December 1971 (The "Aunty Jack's Travelling Show" episode of The Comedy Game was screened at 7:30 pm, Monty Python at 8:55 pm). The Goons have also been mentioned as an inspiration, but in Johnson and Smiedt's history of Australian comedy Boom Boom, Bond himself said that he had listened to The Goons only occasionally. He mentioned Australian radio star Jack Davey, Bob Dyer, the Mickey Mouse Club and The Steve Allen Show as early interests, but cited the surreal black humour of Joseph Heller's novel Catch-22 as a major comedic influence.

Peter Weir was also involved behind the scenes in the early days of the series. He had been part of the university revues they had done together in the 1960s, and had a small part in Homesdale and was credited as a writer on the Aunty Jack's Travelling Show and four episodes of the subsequent series. He gave up performing just before The Aunty Jack Show, saying in a later interview: "We were very much in the vein of Monty Python, and I saw them in England and they were so superior to what we did… that was it. I told my writing partner I wanted to focus on films, I sold him my sketches and that was it. It was very difficult because he had just gotten a TV deal."

Maurice Murphy was a pivotal figure in this fertile era of Australian television comedy—he oversaw Aunty Jack and its various spin-off series, and also acted as a vital buffer between the Aunty Jack creative team and the ABC's conservative management. Ted Robinson, then a young director, got his break working for Murphy on the second series of Aunty Jack. Robinson later took over Murphy's mantle in the 1980s, producing some of the best Australian TV comedy series of the period, including The Big Gig and The Gillies Report. Interviewed for Mouthing Off, a history of Australian comedy, Robinson enthusiastically sang Murphy's praises:

When I was brought in to work on the second series of The Aunty Jack Show, it was my first contact with television comedy, and I was amazed by the atmosphere of drive and energy that Maurice generated. He made it such an exciting time to be working in comedy because the creative climate under him was so open; nothing was considered too mad or bad or off-the-wall that it wouldn't be considered for broadcast. People like me were able to learn their craft 'on-air' in those days, which meant that we were able to make mistakes or even fail completely with programs and still have a job. Maurice encouraged us to take risks and experiment with comedy and I believe this resulted in some of the best and most innovative comedy ever seen on Australian television.

Aunty Jack's Travelling Show convinced the ABC to commission a short series, to be screened weekly. The Aunty Jack Show premiered on 16 November 1972 and became an immediate cult hit with younger audiences, although it was poorly received by critics. Some viewers found it too confronting, and according to Murphy, the ABC received hundreds of calls after the first episode, complaining about the violence, the "bad language" and especially about the drag aspect of the Aunty Jack character.

== Public reaction and cancellation ==
Flange Desire, Aunty Jack, Thin Arthur, and Narrator Neville in 1972

The adverse reaction was reportedly strong enough for the ABC to seriously consider taking the series off the air, but it is generally reported that impassioned pleas from the children of certain ABC executives saved the show from being cancelled. This would not be the team's last such run-in with management, however, and the tensions between the creative and bureaucratic elements in the ABC eventually came to a head with The Off Show in 1977.

Bond ended the show at the end of the second season by having Aunty Jack die of a heart attack, 'mortified' by the other cast members' 'dirty' language and content. Nevertheless, the cast was revived and returned for a special two years later to mark the inauguration of colour television in Australia on 1 March 1975. The special beat ABC's commercial rivals by beginning 3 minutes early, at 11:57 pm 28 February 1975 in black and white and then wiping to colour at midnight.

== Episodes ==
Two series of The Aunty Jack Show were made in 1972 and 1973 respectively. The first series comprised seven episodes, the second six episodes. There were also two specials, one aired 8 June 1973 before the second series began in October, and a second aired in 1975 and an unaired pilot, before the series started. Each episode was built around a central theme.

=== Pilot (1971) ===
No.	Episode titles	Original TV broadcast dates
1	Aunty Jack's Travelling Show	30 December 1971

=== Series one (1972) ===
Regular cast:

Grahame Bond – Aunty Jack
John Derum – Narrator Neville
Rory O'Donoghue – Thin Arthur
Sandra McGregor – Flange Desire

No.	Episode title	Additional cast	Original TV broadcast dates
1	Radio	Terry Camilleri, Kate Fitzpatrick, Sharman Mellick	16 November 1972
2	War	Paul Faranda, Greg Saunders	23 November 1972
3	Kulture	Carla Hoogeveen, Sharman Mellick	30 November 1972
4	Anonymous	Terry Camilleri, Chris Haywood, Carla Hoogeveen, Lex Marinos, Sharman Mellick	7 December 1972
5	Family	Chris Haywood, Carla Hoogeveen, Lex Marinos, Sharman Mellick	14 December 1972
6	Sex	James Bowles	21 December 1972
7	Horror	-	28 December 1972

=== Special (1973) ===
No.	Episode titles	Original TV broadcast dates
1	Aunty Jack Rox On	8 June 1973

=== Series two (1973) ===
Regular cast:

Grahame Bond – Aunty Jack/Kev Kavanagh
Garry McDonald – Kid Eager/Norman Gunston
Rory O'Donoghue – Thin Arthur
Sandra McGregor – Flange Desire

No.	Title	Length	Aspect ratio	Original release date
1	"The Channel Nine Show"	30 minutes	4:3	25 October 1973
The episode sees Channel 9 launching a new-look Aunty Jack Show, starring Kid Eager as Aunty Jack. Aunty Jack protests and takes back the show. Other skits include the Gong-fu skit, set in a Chinese Restaurant and a new segment 'What's on in Wollongong'. Additional cast Woman on Television – Jane Harders Policeman – Rob Steele Note The episode was released on the Aunty Jack Show Complete series 1 and 2 box set on DVD in 2006.
2	"The Iron Maiden Show"	30 minutes	4:3	1 November 1973
The episode sees Aunty Jack looking back on her past as Princess Jack, royalty in Wollongong, when 'things' kidnapped her parents, where she goes on search for them. Later in the episode, Kev Kavanagh is seen in London on a butcher's grant. Additional cast Dorothy Dix – Sheila Bradley Hilda – Shirley-Anne Kear Note The episode was released on the Aunty Jack Show Complete series 1 and 2 box set on DVD in 2006.
3	"The Golden Glove Show"	30 minutes	4:3	8 November 1973
The episode sees Aunty Jack back when she won her golden glove for the world heavy-weight boxing competition. Kid Eager discovers that the glove has magical powers and decides to steal it, whilst Flange Desire decides to marry Kid Eager for his money and so Aunty Jack and Thin Arthur engage him in a card game to make sure that the money goes to them instead. Additional cast Gloria Glee – Shirley-Anne Kear Note The episode was released on the Aunty Jack Show Complete series 1 and 2 box set on DVD in 2006.
4	"The Ear, Nose And Throat Show"	30 minutes	4:3	15 November 1973
The episode sees Aunty Jack attempting to get rid of her feminity. It is decided that her moustache needs to come off, but the gang can't remove it and so they shrink to remove the moustache, but end up being swallowed and take our tour of the inside of Aunty Jack. The episode also shows a short documentary on a five-year bus driving course. Note The episode was released on the Aunty Jack Show Complete series 1 and 2 box set on DVD in 2006.
5	"The Little Lovelies Show"	30 minutes	4:3	22 November 1973
The episode sees Aunty Jack haunted by her own ghost, using protection from the rest of the gang and a new fictional television show, New Faces, hosted by Norman Tavistock. The episode also features a daring football game starring Aunty Jack. Additional cast 2nd Aunty Jack – Lex Marinos Note The episode was released on the Aunty Jack Show Complete series 1 and 2 box set on DVD in 2006.
6	"The R-Certificate Show"	30 minutes	4:3	29 November 1973

=== Special (1975) ===
No.	Episode titles	Original TV broadcast dates
1	Aunty Jack Introduces Colour	28 February 1975

== Regulars ==
Aunty Jack alternated one-off sketches with segments featuring many regular and semi-regular characters. All episodes featured segments with Aunty Jack and her sidekicks – Flange Desire (Sandra McGregor), Thin Arthur (Rory O'Donoghue) and, in the first season the Narrator Neville (John Derum) who was replaced in the second season by Kid Eager (Garry McDonald), a parodic amalgam of characters like Dennis the Menace and Ginger Meggs. There were also semi-regular appearances by the folk-singing duo Errol and Neil (Grahame & Rory), and rock'n'roll butcher Kev Kavanagh (Bond), a character that he had introduced (as "Mr Kevin") in Peter Weir's Homesdale.

Derum left the show after Series 1, wishing to pursue other interests. Derum appeared in archival footage in the special, Aunty Jack Rox On, and was replaced in Series 2 by a new cast member, Garry McDonald, a talented young actor, comedian and musician, who had recently graduated from the National Institute of Dramatic Art. His main role was as Aunty Jack's new sidekick, the cheeky, gum-chewing, freckle-faced Kid Eager. In one episode McDonald premiered a new character, devised by a viewer: Wendy Skelcher had taken up a writing course and was inspired by the first episodes to write and submit scripts, which were welcomed by the team. This character featured only briefly in Aunty Jack, but became much more prominent in the spin-off Wollongong the Brave as the Wollongong media 'un-personality' Norman Gunston. The Gunston character also appeared on the Aunty Jack Sings Wollongong LP and starred in the Logie-winning Tonight Show parody, The Norman Gunston Show, which premiered in 1975.

Some of the sketches over the two series included the following:

- Tarzan Superape ("An origami rock opera"), which parodied Jesus Christ Superstar
- Dried Elephant Arrangements for Beginners, in which Aunty Jack visits Taronga Zoo to teach viewers the fine art of "elephanto reducioso" with the reluctant assistance of Colin the elephant
- Colonel Passionfruit, a campy military commander who led his squad of gay troops through a dangerous choreographed war with the help of The Pride of Erin Mine Avoidance Tactic #III
- Country and eastern singers, The Farrelly Brothers, who performed a unique version of Lucky Starr's "I've Been Everywhere" – but in this version the only places they had been were the NSW regional towns of Wollongong and Dapto (Bond's home town)
- Flat 1A 968 George St (a parody of popular 'sex and sin' soap opera Number 96) in which viewers were promised "lots of bottoms and lots of breasts" – at which point two actors are shown, clad in multiple plastic 'joke' bottoms and breasts.

== Feature film ==
A compilation of colour filmed segments from the first series was edited into an 85-minute feature The Very Best of The Aunty Jack Show which was screened at the 1973 Montreux Film Festival. It was not seen by Australian audiences until it was broadcast on ABC television on 26 January 1991.

== Legacy ==
The popularity of the series led to a one-off TV special, Aunty Jack Rox On with special guest Stevie Wright, a concert tour, a #1 hit single, "Farewell Aunty Jack" (a version of the closing theme of the series) and a best-selling album Aunty Jack Sings Wollongong, released in early 1974. "Farewell Aunty Jack" was released as a single in December 1973, reached Number 1 on the Australian charts a week later, where it stayed for 3 weeks. It was the first Australian single in picture-disc form to hit No.1 nationally, reputedly being the first disc of its kind in the world (although "Goondiwindi Grey" by Tex Morton in 1972 had also been issued in Australia as a picture disc too, but didn't hit the top spot nationally).

By the time Series 2 was underway Bond was already tired of Aunty Jack so he decided to kill her off in the final episode, "The R-Certificate Show" when, shocked by the gratuitous sex and nudity, Aunty Jack expires from a heart attack. Bond then departed for a much-needed holiday on Norfolk Island where, jointly inspired by the convict ruins and his holiday reading, Errol Flynn's My Wicked, Wicked Ways, he came up with the concept for a new series set in the bushranger days, which became Flash Nick from Jindivick.

The next outing for the classic Aunty Jack team was Wollongong the Brave (1974), a series of four one-hour specials that showcased favourite characters from the series. Episode 1 Aunty Jack'n'The Gong in Bloody Concert featured the core characters, augmented by a rock group. Episode 2 featured 'Country and Mediterranean' music group The Farelly Brothers and their singing sheep Jason; Episode 3 featured meat guru Kev Kavanagh and the final instalment Norman Gunston: The Golden Weeks eventually spawned The Norman Gunston Show in late 1975.

At 11:57 PM on Friday 28 February 1975, Aunty Jack, Thin Arthur, and Kid Eager introduced colour television broadcasting on ABC-TV, beating another channel's first colour program by deliberately starting three minutes early. The team's last major TV collaboration was the abortive comedy series The Off Show (1977) which was cancelled after only a few episodes following a controversial incident in which ABC executive Alan Batemen pulled the premiere episode from the schedule half an hour before it was due to air and then erased the tape, reportedly because he was offended by the Bill Harding religious parody sketch "Leave It To Jesus".

The character of Norman Gunston, originally created for a single sketch in the second series, was given his own series The Norman Gunston Show which ran from 1975 to 1983. After a faltering start, it became hugely popular and McDonald won the Gold Logie in 1976.

Bond, O'Donoghue, McDonald, MacGregor and Derum later appeared in News Free Zone, created by Murphy in 1985. Each episode included an Aunty Jack sketch in a section called Vintage Video. Bond also revived the character Kev Kevanagh.

Although fans long hoped that The Aunty Jack Show might be released on home video, it was more than thirty years after the show's first screening until this took place. Although there have been a number of reasons suggested, it is generally accepted that the major stumbling block was a long-running disagreement between Bond and the ABC, stemming from Bond and O'Donoghue's resentment over the presumed loss of several Aunty Jack episodes and the Off Show incident. Since Bond and O'Donoghue controlled the rights for all the original music featured in the series, their refusal to release them effectively kept the series from release until 2005.

For many years there were persistent rumours—fuelled by press statements from Bond himself—that some episodes had been lost or destroyed. This was given added credence by the fact that (like the BBC) the ABC had undertaken an "economy drive" in the late 1970s and early 1980s, during which (it has been reported) substantial portions of many shows were erased.

Although (according to Bond) the original master tapes for three episodes were erased, all the original film footage shot for the missing episodes had survived and with the assistance of the National Archives of Australia the footage was located and restored, enabling the missing episodes to be reconstructed. The long-awaited release of the complete Series 1 on DVD took place in December 2005, and the complete Series 2 followed in April 2006. Although the master videotapes were monochrome, and the main episodes are presented in this format on DVD, much of the footage for the series was filmed in colour and these are included as alternate scenes. The only episode in the entire Aunty Jack Show series not to be released on DVD was the 1973 special, 'Aunty Jack Rox On'.

In 2019, TV Week listed The Aunty Jack Show at #99 in its list of the 101 greatest Australian television shows of all time, which appeared in its monthly TV Week Close Up publication. The magazine said the character's aggressive attitude, her golden boxing glove and her "I'll rip yer bloody arms off" catchphrase quickly established her, and the show, as comedy icons.

== Stage show ==
Aunty Jack returned in early 2006 in a live stage show titled The Aunty Jack Show and Tell, starring Grahame Bond and Rory O'Donoghue. As well as Aunty Jack and Thin Arthur, the show featured the singing tramps Neil and Errol, Country and Eastern music exponents the Farrelly Brothers, the Ri Fol Tit Men and bodgie butcher and meat artist Kev Kavanagh.

== See also ==
- Aunty Jack Introduces Colour
- Aunty Jack Sings Wollongong
- Farewell Aunty Jack
- Wollongong the Brave
