= Jude Kuring =

Australian actress

- Born: Judith Kuring; Windsor, New South Wales, Australia
- Occupation: Actress
- Years active: 1968–95; 2003-2017
- Awards: Nominated, AFI Award Best Actress in a Supporting Role, for Maybe This Time (1980)

Judith Kuring is an Australian actress who appeared in theatre, film, and television during the late 1970s and early 80s. She remains best known for her stint as the recurring character of petty criminal Noeline Bourke in the soap opera Prisoner in 1979 until 1980.

== Early life and education ==
Judith Kuring, later known as Jude, was born in Windsor, New South Wales.

== Career ==
=== Stage ===
Kuring started her acting career in theatre in 1968. She joined the Australian Performing Group in Melbourne in the early 1970s, performing in a number of plays, variety shows and other stage productions. Along with Helen Garner and four other women, she devised and performed in the 1972 seminal performance at the Pram Factory, Betty Can Jump, which influenced feminist theatre and thought across Australia for the rest of the decade.

In 1981, alongside Chris Westwood, Kuring formed a women's group as a subgroup of APG, they had been discussing the lack of roles for women in local theatre, relegated to the "hooker with a heart" or mother, and began organising members at the Nimrod Theatre, they were given a 110.000 grant from Limited Life Project" which they utilised for play readings and a series of workshops and included a seminar on women, comedy and music.

=== Screen ===
Although making her first appearance on the police drama Homicide in 1971, Kuring would not begin television acting for another four years until being cast in a minor role in the 1975 television movie They Don't Clap Losers. During the next few years, she was seen on the television series Alvin Purple as well as playing various characters on comedy shows, including Wollongong the Brave.

In 1977, Kuring made her film debut in The Singer and the Dancer as Mrs Herbert, the nagging daughter of Mrs Bilson (Ruth Cracknell). Later that year, she appeared in her breakout role as Grace in the cult film Journey Among Women.

She had supporting roles in Newsfront and The Journalist.

She was subsequently cast as Noeline Bourke in the soap opera Prisoner.

Noeline was largely portrayed as a "bogan" thief and the head of a small family of petty thieves, Bourke was introduced to the series as an inmate emerging to fight Monica Ferguson (Lesley Baker) for position of "top dog" while Bea Smith (Val Lehman) is recovering in hospital. One of the subplots during the first and second seasons of the series focused on her criminal family, and in one episode, her dimwitted brother Col is killed by police during a hostage situation. Her character was released shortly after, however she was again caught breaking into a warehouse with her daughter Leanne and returned to Wentworth where she served another brief stint.

Taking time off from the series, Kuring appeared in the 1980 film Maybe This Time for which she was nominated for Best Actress in a Supporting Role by the Australian Film Institute.

Kuring reappeared on the series, her character being reintroduced shortly after the death of her daughter Leanne, who had been killed during a protest at the prison. After being accepted into the prison's work release program, she is coerced to help one of the employees, Kay White (Sandy Gore), by using her family to steal fabric from the factory. She is set up by White however and, with the work release canceled, she is transferred to Barnhurst (another prison) for her own protection.

After guest appearing on Waterloo Station in 1983, Kuring subsequently moved away from acting.

After a long tenure away from acting, Kuring once more returned to her former career in 2013 to play a prominent role in the movie Prisoner Queen, which centred on an obsessed fan of the Prisoner television series.

In 1995, Jude featured in the pilot of an LGBTQI+ sitcom called Buck House, playing the lead role of Phyllis Buck. Originally filmed before a live studio audience at the Australian Film, Television & Radio School, Buck House underwent considerable rewrites following its initial popularity. A new 8-episode series was created for streaming on the internet in 1997.

In 2013, she appeared in film The House Cleaner and in 2017 7 from Etheria.

== Filmography ==
=== Film ===
Year	Title	Role	Notes
1975	The Firm Man	Conservationist	Feature film
1975	They Don't Clap Losers		TV movie
1976	Summer of Secrets	Shop Assistant	Feature film
1977	The Singer and the Dancer	Mrs. Herbert	Feature film
1977	Journey Among Women	Grace	Feature film
1978	Newsfront	Geoff's Wife	Feature film
1979	Temperament Unsuited	Mr. Redmond	Short film
1979	The Journalist	Kate	Film
1989	Maybe This Time	Meredith	Feature film
2003	Prisoner Queen: Mindless Music and Mirror Balls	Mum	Feature Film
2013	The House Cleaner	Dame Judith	
2017	7 from Etheria	Agnes	Segment: "Little Lamb"

=== Television ===
Year	Title	Role	Notes
1971	Matlock Police	Reporter	TV series
1971/72	Homicide	Sister/Claudia Jones	TV series
1972	Division 4	Nurse/Miss West	TV series
1975	Wollongong the Brave	3 roles	TV miniseries
1976	Alvin Purple	Arlene	TV series
1977	The Of Show	Various characters	TV series
1979	The Garry McDonald Show	Various characters	TV series
1978-80	Prisoner	Noeline Burke	TV series
1983	Waterloo Station		TV series
1995	Buck House	Phyllis Buck	TV series
2023	Celebrity House Cleaner	Dame Judith	TV series

== Theatre ==
Year	Title	Role	Notes
1973	Dimboola: The Stage Play	Mavis McAdam, Aunt of the Groom	Stage play
