= Captain Bloody =

- a rock 'n' roll comedy
- Music: Grahame Bond
- Lyrics: Grahame Bond and Jim Burnett
- Book: Grahame Bond and Jim Burnett
- Productions: 1984–85 Australia

Captain Bloody is an Australian musical comedy by Grahame Bond and Jim Burnett.

It concerns a young gynaecologist, Eric Blood, whose closet fantasy is to be Errol Flynn. He finds out about a club, Heroes Anonymous, where people can live out their fantasies without hurting anyone, run by a man who thinks he is Winston Churchill.

Captain Bloody opened at the Footbridge Theatre in Sydney on 1 May 1984 and ran to 23 June 1984, produced by the Australian Elizabethan Theatre Trust and Dunsinane Enterprises. It then played a short season at the Canberra Theatre from 3–7 July 1984. The cast included Bond, Arky Michael, Elizabeth Lord, John O'Connell, Greg Stone and George Washingmachine. A Melbourne season played at the Princess Theatre from March 1985.

The Sydney Morning Herald described the musical as "a Boys Own adventure, slightly bent but harmless enough. It features snappy dance routines, excellent music, and jokes about police corruption and Young Liberals are kept to a tasteful minimum." Bond reflected that Captain Bloody "did well in Sydney but was savaged in Melbourne".
