= Maurice Murphy (director) =

Australian film and television director

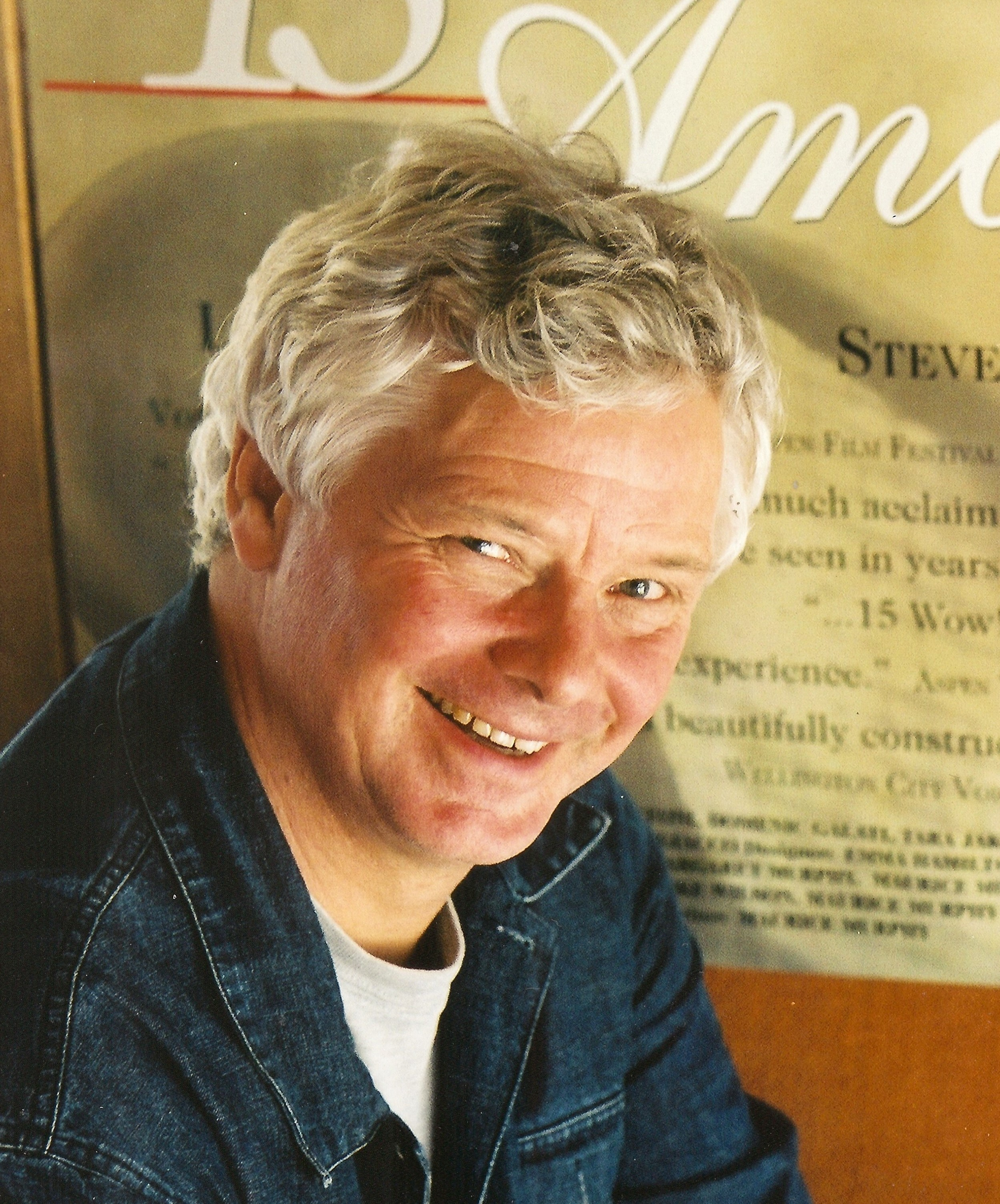
- Maurice Murphy at a screening of 15 Amore
- Born: Maurice Brendan Murphy; 1939 (age 86–87); Sydney, Australia
- Occupations: Film and television director; producer; writer; actor
- Years active: 1965–present

Maurice Brendan Murphy (born 1939 in Sydney) is an Australian film and television director, producer, writer and actor. He is best known for his influential work as a director of TV comedy programs for the Australian Broadcasting Corporation – most notably The Aunty Jack Show – and for his 1980 feature film adaptation of the Australian comic strip Fatty Finn.

After a month as a Melbourne University student, Murphy realised that his true calling was in the entertainment world. For the next three years, he financed his theatrical pursuits at The Little Theatre in South Yarra, by working at the Victorian Railways. In 1960, Murphy joined the Australian Broadcasting Commission (ABC) where he worked his way up to being a director: 'The ABC was a great training institute at that time, and a place which allowed me much creative freedom. I learned a great deal there'. His first big break was in 1967 with the big budget 20-episode variety series, I'm Alright Now, with Reg Livermore. In 1973, Murphy became Head of Entertainment at the ABC.

== Influences ==
Murphy's show biz enthusiasm was well-developed long before his ABC years. As a young child he was enthralled by the physical comedy of the clowns at Wirth's Circus. Later at boarding school he discovered Abbott & Costello films, delighting in their vaudevillian routines. The cinema became an integral part of Murphy's school holidays with musicals, Bob Hope and Bing Crosby 'Road' movies and comedies his favourite genres and ones that would influence his future work.

Throughout his school years Murphy would regularly escape into the wonders of radio hit parades, spending countless hours analysing pop song structures and writing down lyrics. He applied these skills to television comedies. 'I worked out how the shows were structured. I wrote down the scenes. Sketched the sets. Analysed the placement of dialogue and the positions for its delivery. I noticed the similarity in patterning and timing between various shows. I really got to understand how TV comedy was staged', says Murphy.

== British comedy ==
Murphy spent 1968–1971 in England working at the BBC and London Weekend Television. He was mentored by Frank Muir and worked with many British comedy stars including Ronnie Barker, Tommy Cooper, Harry Corbett and Wendy Craig. He directed Doctor in the House, starring Robin Nedwell, which was the first non-American comedy series to be bought by US television.

In 1968 Murphy directed the 6-episode series of Complete and Utter History of Britain starring Michael Palin and Terry Jones. It was a highly original look at medieval history using television techniques to satirise the events. For instance, the Battle of Hastings was broadcast as a soccer match. The series is regarded as the precursor to Monty Python's Flying Circus and until 2004 it was believed that no copies of the series had survived.

== Australian comedy ==
On his return to Australia in 1972, Murphy helped to create the ground-breaking anarchistic comedy, The Aunty Jack Show, starring Grahame Bond, Rory O'Donoghue, John Derum and Sandra McGregor. He used some unorthodox methods to get the show to air. After the first episode was screened, the ABC received more than 1000 complaints and Murphy knew he had a winner.

A spin-off from The Aunty Jack Show was The Norman Gunston Show, a comic satire featuring an unsophisticated reporter from Wollongong. The Gunston character was devised by Wendy Skelcher and played by Garry McDonald. The series achieved considerable success and inspired several contemporary comedians. Norman Gunston has the distinction of being the only television character, as opposed to an actor known for playing a character, to win a Gold Logie, the premier Australian television accolade. In 1975, the first colour television to appear on Australian screens was a brilliant sketch devised by Murphy and Grahame Bond, in which a black and white Aunty Jack tried in vain to stop colour slowly seeping into the scene.

Murphy believes that comedy has a very important social role to play, and is also important for us individually. One of his recurrent themes is that the children within us are able to overcome the adult world with absurdist humour.

== Films ==
Murphy has written, directed or produced a number of independent feature films. His first films were ones for children, Fatty Finn and Doctors and Nurses, stories in which children were at odds with the adult world. Then a young adult satirical comedy with the emphasis on fun, Exchange Lifeguards (aka Wet and Wild Summer!) starring Julian McMahon, Christopher Atkins and Elliott Gould. More serious was his family tale of love in wartime, 15 Amore starring Lisa Hensley and Steve Bastoni. 15 Amore was voted the Audience Favourite Feature at the Aspen Filmfest in 1998 and was awarded the Crystal Palm Award at the Marco Island Film Festival in 2000.

More recently, the ethereal singing of the students of New Zealand's Toi Whakaari inspired Murphy to create a musical feature film, Zenolith, as a vehicle for their talents. He co-wrote the song lyrics with Lee Hatherly and secured the collaboration of New Zealand composer, Gareth Farr, and the Tasmanian Symphony Orchestra. In 2014, he wrote and directed a feature-length documentary about Queen Elizabeth II's 1953-1954 royal visit to New Zealand and Australia, When the Queen Came to Town.

== Ethos ==
Murphy has always enjoyed having fun with technology and pushing it to the limits, often with budgetary constraints. He believes such limitations inspire innovation. In 1965 he invented a way of reversing video tape to enable images to be run backwards. In 1990, Murphy made Let's Do Lunch, the first television series in the world to be filmed on Handicam.

Murphy's work is characterised by variety and diversity. He continues to challenge himself with new adventures and projects. He has recently written, produced and starred in several one-man stage shows.

In 2016 he was the consultant editor for The Mathematics Book, a coffee table book by Helen Prochazka created to make mathematics accessible for adults who would like to know more about the subject. Murphy and Prochazka have co-written the lyrics for a cycle of 14 mathematics songs that complements the book. The pop song poetry project was presented at the 2014 Bridges Organization conference in Seoul. The album was released in 2016, the music written and performed by Nic Courto and Craig M Wood.

Currently Murphy is also developing an opera about Sir Edmund Hillary and an animation feature film, Marsupia.

== Director ==
=== Television shows ===
- The Whole Show (2000) TV special
- Let's Do Lunch (1990) TV series (6 episodes)
- News Free Zone (1985) TV series (50 episodes)
- The Tea Ladies (1978) TV series (9 episodes)
- Freddy Starr Special (1978) TV special
- The Little Big Show (1978) TV special
- The Off Show (1977) TV series aka The Of Show (Australia) (9 episodes)
- Alvin Purple (1976) TV series (13 episodes)
- Flash Nick from Jindavick (1974–75) TV series (6 episodes)
- The Very Best of The Aunty Jack Show (1973) TV special
- Aunty Jack Rox On (1972) TV special
- Doctor in Charge (1972) TV series (6 episodes)
- A Nice Day at the Office (1972) (6 episodes)
- The Aunty Jack Show (1971–72) TV series (13 episodes)
- The Comedy Game (1971–73) TV series (14 episodes)
- Not Only… But Also (1971) TV special
- The Dudley Moore Trio (1971) TV special
- Six Dates with Barker (1970) TV series (6 episodes)
- Hark at Barker (1970) TV series (6 episodes)
- Doctor in the House (1969) TV series (9 episodes)
- Complete and Utter History of Britain (1969) TV series (6 episodes)
- I'm Alright Now (1967) TV series (20 episodes)

=== Feature films ===
- When the Queen Came to Town (documentary) (2014)
- Zenolith (2008)
- 15 Amore (1998)
- Wet and Wild Summer! (1992) aka "Exchange Lifeguards" (Australia)
- Doctors & Nurses (1981)
- Fatty Finn (1980)

=== Stage shows ===
- My Imaginary Family (2011)
- Maurice (2007)
- Aunty Jack Show and Tell (2006)
- Good Story (2003)
- Screenplay (2003)
- Razzle Dazzle (1975)
- Hamlet on Ice (1974)
- Aunty Jack and the Gong in Bloody Concert (1973)

== Producer ==
=== Television shows ===
- The Whole Show (2000) TV special
- I Do! I Do! (1997) TV series (13 episodes)
- Just Kidding (1994–95) TV series (75 episodes)
- Let's Do Lunch (1990) TV series (6 episodes)
- News Free Zone (1985) TV series (50 episodes)
- Freddy Starr Special (1978) TV special
- The Little Big Show (1978) TV special
- The Off Show (1977) TV series aka The of Show (Australia) (9 episodes)
- Alvin Purple (1976) TV series (13 episodes)
- Wollongong the Brave (1975) TV series (4 episodes)
- Flash Nick from Jindavick (1974–75) TV series (6 episodes)
- The Very Best of The Aunty Jack Show (1973) TV special
- Our Man in the Company (1973) TV series (10 episodes)
- The Comedy Game (1971–73) TV series (14 episodes)
- Aunty Jack Rox On (1972) TV special
- A Nice Day at the Office (1972) (6 episodes)
- The Aunty Jack Show (1971–72) TV series (13 episodes)
- Not Only… But Also (1971) TV special
- The Dudley Moore Trio (1971) TV special

=== Feature films ===
- Zenolith (2008)
- 15 Amore (1998)
- Doctors & Nurses (1981)

=== Stage shows ===
- Maurice (2007)
- Aunty Jack Show and Tell (2006)
- Good Story (2003)
- Screenplay (2003)
- Razzle Dazzle (1975)
- Hamlet on Ice (1974)
- Aunty Jack and the Gong in Bloody Concert (1973)

=== Radio ===
- Nude Radio (1974) Radio Show

== Writer ==
=== Television shows ===
- The Whole Show (2000) TV special
- Let's Do Lunch (1990) TV series (6 episodes)
- News Free Zone (1985) TV series (50 episodes)
- The Tea Ladies (1978) TV series (9 episodes)
- The Little Big Show (1978) TV special
- The Off Show (1977) TV series aka The of Show (Australia) (9 episodes)
- Alvin Purple (1976) TV series (13 episodes)
- Scattergood: Friend of All (1975) TV series
- Wollongong the Brave (1975) TV series (4 episodes)
- Flash Nick from Jindavick (1974–75) TV series (6 episodes)
- The Very Best of The Aunty Jack Show (1973) TV special
- The Comedy Game (1971–73) TV series (14 episodes)
- Aunty Jack Rox On (1972) TV special
- A Nice Day at the Office (1972) (6 episodes)
- The Aunty Jack Show (1971–72) TV series (13 episodes)
- Six Dates with Barker (1970) TV series (6 episodes)
- Hark at Barker (1970) TV series (6 episodes)
- I'm Alright Now (1967) TV series (20 episodes)

=== Feature films ===
- When the Queen Came to Town (documentary) (2014)
- Zenolith (2008)
- 15 Amore (1998)
- Channel Chaos (1984)
- Doctors & Nurses (1981)

=== Stage shows ===
- Maurice (2007)
- Aunty Jack Show and Tell (2006)
- Good Story (2003)
- Screenplay (2003)
- Aunty Jack and the Gong in Bloody Concert (1973)

=== Radio ===
- Nude Radio (1974) Radio Show

=== Book ===
- The Mathematics Book (2016), consultant editor

=== Songs ===
- Songs from The Mathematics Book (to be released in 2016)

== Actor ==
=== Television shows ===
- Benny Hill Down Under (1977) TV series – various roles
- Consider Your Verdict (1962) one episode Queen Versus Brooks (1962)

=== Stage shows ===
- Maurice (2007)
- Aunty Jack Show and Tell (2006)
- Good Story (2003)
- Screenplay (2003)
