= Boys Own McBeth =

1979 musical comedy

Boy's Own McBeth
- a really rotten tragedy
- Music: Grahame Bond
- Lyrics: Grahame Bond and Jim Burnett
- Book: Grahame Bond and Jim Burnett
- Productions: 1979 Australia; 1981 Los Angeles

Boy's Own McBeth is a musical comedy by Grahame Bond and Jim Burnett.

Set in Australia, it concerns Terry Shakespeare, a 42-year-old man who has been a student at the fictional Dunsinane Boys School for 36 years, deliberately failing rather than facing the outside world.

After a season at The Kirk Gallery in Sydney from July 1979, Boy's Own McBeth opened in a bigger production at the Paris Theatre in November 1979. It toured widely across Australia for two years.

A cast recording was released in 1979.

The production also played at the Westwood Playhouse in Los Angeles.
