= Ted Robinson (TV director) =

Australian television director

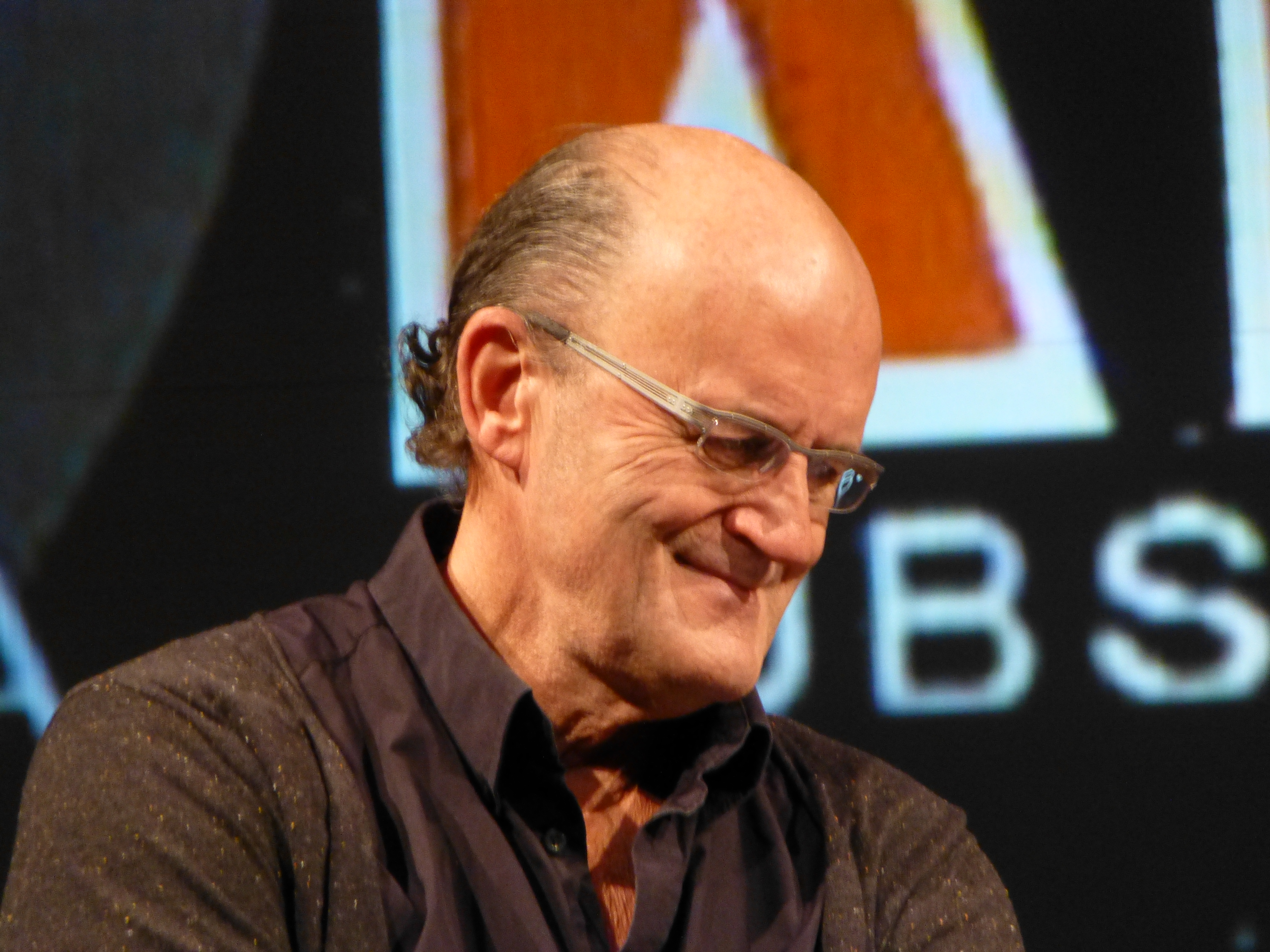
- Ted Robinson at the DAAS Kapital DVD launch in 2013
- Occupation(s): Television producer and director
- Employer: Australian Broadcasting Corporation

Ted Robinson is an Australian television producer and director, best known for his work as a director and producer of live TV comedy.

== Career ==
Ted Robinson began his TV career at the Australian Broadcasting Corporation, working on The Aunty Jack Show, under the tutelage of series director Maurice M. Murphy. His TV directorial debut was in 1973, with the ABC sitcom Our Man in the Company. In 1974 he took over from Murphy as director of the two Aunty Jack spinoff series, Wollongong the Brave and Flash Nick from Jindavik. During the late 1970s he also co-hosted a regular radio show on Double Jay (2JJ) in Sydney, with actor Lex Marinos.

Robinson went on to produce and/or direct many landmark comedy series (mainly for the ABC) from the 1980s to the present, including The Gillies Report, The Dingo Principle, The Big Gig, DAAS Kapital, Live and Sweaty, The Late Show, The Glass House, This Sporting Life, The Sideshow, Chandon Pictures, and Good News Week.

== Awards ==
Robinson won the Australian Film Institute Longford Life Achievement Award in 2003.

== Select credits ==
- After Marcuse (1985)
