= Grahame Bond =

Australian actor, writer, director, musician, architect and composer

Grahame Bond AM
- Born: Grahame John Bond; 21 November 1943 (age 82); Australia
- Education: University of Sydney
- Occupations: Actor; writer; director; musician; composer
- Known for: The Aunty Jack Show
- Spouse: Kate Parker
- Awards: AACTA Award for Best Original Music Score

Grahame John Bond AM (born 21 November 1943) is an Australian actor, writer, director, musician and composer, known primarily for his role as Aunty Jack.

== Early career ==
Bond began his career in entertainment at University of Sydney in the 1960s as a founding student member of the Sydney University Architecture Revue, which included his university friends, then architect Geoffrey Atherden (writer Mother and Son); director Peter Weir; composer Peter Best; and Rory O'Donoghue.

Bond graduated with a Bachelor of Architecture degree in 1967 and began tutoring in design at Sydney University in the late 1960s, although his performing career soon took over and he spent much of the next two decades writing and performing on TV, radio and the stage.

Following the success of the 1967 Sydney University Architecture Revue "The Great Wall of Porridge", Bond and others (including Atherden and Weir) were invited to stage a professional revue for Producers Authors Composers and Talent (now PACT Centre for Emerging Artists) and Sydney's Cellblock Theatre at the National Art School, called Balloon Dubloon which (at the request of festival director Sir Robert Helpmann) was also staged at the Adelaide Festival. In 1969, soon after Balloon Dubloon Bob Allnutt of the PACT Theatre Company — who was also working for the ABC's religious affairs department — commissioned Bond and Weir to make a one-hour special, Man on a Green Bike, which was Bond's first TV appearance.

In 1970 Bond wrote and performed in another successful comedy revue, Hamlet on Ice.

== Aunty Jack ==
In 1971, Peter Weir wrote and directed his first short feature film, a surreal black comedy called Homesdale with an ensemble cast that included rising actress Kate Fitzpatrick. In the film Bond played Mister Kevin, the first incarnation of the popular Aunty Jack Show character Kev Kavanagh. Soon after Homesdale Bond and Weir were asked to create a children's radio series for the ABC, to replace the long-running Argonauts Club. It was for this series that Bond created the gravel-voiced cross-dressing character Aunty Jack, who was based on an uncle whom he had disliked as a child.

In 1972 Bond, O'Donoghue, Weir and Atherden were commissioned by the new head of ABC TV comedy, Maurice Murphy, to create a new short sketch comedy series, The Aunty Jack Show, based around the Aunty Jack character; it premiered in early 1972 with Bond, O'Donoghue, Sandra McGregor, John Derum (Series 1) and Garry McDonald (Series 2) as the main performing team. Despite a rash of early complaints—notably about Aunty Jack's gender, her frequent use of the word "bloody" and her habit of punching everyone – The Aunty Jack Show soon found a loyal audience and became one of the most popular comedy series in ABC history.

As well as writing many sketches and co-writing all the original music with Rory O'Donoghue, Bond played many recurring and occasional characters including Aunty Jack, rock'n'roll butcher Kev Kavanagh and nervous folk singer Errol. Two series of Aunty Jack were made in 1972–73 and 1973–74 and in March 1975 Bond revived Aunty Jack for a special that launched colour TV broadcasting on the ABC. The Aunty Jack team also undertook a successful concert tour during 1974 and, boosted by the popularity of the show, the Aunty Jack theme song (Australia's first picture disc single) went to #1 on the Australian pop chart for 3 weeks, followed by a successful LP based on the show, Aunty Jack Sings Wollongong.

=== NSW retirement from politics ===
NSW Premier Sir Robert Askin's retirement from politics in 1975 was greeted on This Day Tonight by the cast of The Aunty Jack Show, with a reworded version of "Farewell, Aunty Jack":

Farewell Robin A,
We think you've had your day
Though you're four foot three
You don't do much for me
You're short, round and fat
A pudden in a hat,
There's a scream as you plummet away.

— Cast of The Aunty Jack Show, This Day Tonight (1975)

== Later career ==
Following Aunty Jack, Bond did considerable work in TV, radio and theatre. His TV credits include the Aunty Jack spinoffs Wollongong the Brave (1974), Flash Nick from Jindavick (1974) and the ill-fated The Off Show (1977). On radio, Bond, O'Donoghue and McDonald continued their partnership with the weekly comedy program Nude Radio, which aired on the ABC's newly established rock radio station 2JJ (Double Jay) in Sydney during 1975. Bond's theatrical credits include the popular Shakespearean parody Boys Own McBeth, which toured Australia and the United States in the late 1970s. In the 1980s he wrote and directed the comedy musical Captain Bloody for the Elizabethan Theatre Trust.

Although the series made him a star and Aunty Jack is now widely acknowledged as one of the milestones in Australian comedy, the Aunty Jack character became something of a burden for Bond; his TV career after Aunty Jack was also increasingly hampered by conflicts with conservative elements in the ABC, particularly after the departure of Maurice Murphy, who had consistently championed and protected Bond and his colleagues from management interference.

These problems culminated in a controversial incident in 1977 which led Bond and O'Donoghue to sever their association with ABC-TV. On the night of the first episode of Bond and O'Donoghue's new sketch series The Off Show, the ABC's newly appointed head of comedy Alan Bateman ordered the program to be pulled from the schedule half an hour before it was due to go to air, and he then destroyed the tape, reportedly because he was offended by a Bill Harding-penned religious parody sketch entitled "Leave It To Jesus". The remaining episodes of the series were subsequently screened as The Of Show. The only surviving artefact of the erased program is the theme song for the "Leave It To Jesus" sketch, which was released in 2006 as a bonus track on the CD reissue of Aunty Jack Sings Wollongong.

Although Bond returned to the ABC briefly in 1985 to host a short-lived comedy series, News Free Zone, his unhappiness over the presumed loss of several episodes of Aunty Jack, combined with The Off Show incident, effectively ended his relationship with the ABC. As a result, the ABC was for many years unable to release The Aunty Jack Show to home video because Bond and O'Donoghue refused to agree to the licensing of their music rights over the series. The missing episodes were found in the early 2000s, Bond and O'Donoghue reconciled with the ABC, and the complete, restored series of The Aunty Jack Show and Wollongong the Brave were released on DVD in 2005/2006.

In 1990, Bond opened his own advertising agency, Bond Strohfeldt, with clients including Daihatsu, Bridgestone, Virgin and Disney. He sold the business in 1996 in order to travel. His journeys included trekking in Nepal, canoeing in Kakadu, cycling from Hanoi to Saigon, and archaeological excavations in Jordan, Cyprus and Syria. In the early 2000s Bond filmed a documentary in Papua New Guinea titled The Big Chief.

In the 1990s Bond hosted the Channel Seven game show Whose House is it Anyway, and was a presenter on the popular Seven lifestyle series Better Homes and Gardens for six years.

Internationally, he is best known for his recurring role as The Ancient One in the first two seasons of the Beastmaster television series in 1999 and 2000. In 1977, he appeared as Aunty Jack on British television in Not The Aunty Jack Show for London Weekend Television.

On 30 March 2006 he and Rory O'Donoghue undertook a national tour of their new stage show The Aunty Jack Show and Tell, to promote the release of the Aunty Jack DVDs.

== Publication ==
In October 2011, Bond released his autobiography, Jack of All Trades Mistress of One.

== Honours ==
On 11 June 2012, Bond was named a Member of the Order of Australia for "service to the performing arts as an actor, writer and composer, and as a supporter of aspiring artists."

== Discography ==
=== Studio albums ===
List of albums, with selected chart positions
Title	Album details	Peak chart positions
Title	Album details	AUS
Aunty Jack Sings Wollongong	Released: November 1974; Format: LP; Label: Polydor (2907 012)	39

=== Singles ===
List of singles, with selected chart positions
Year	Title	Peak chart positions	Album
Year	Title	AUS	Album
1973	"Farewell Aunty Jack"	1	Aunty Jack Sings Wollongong
