= Wollongong the Brave =

1975 Australian TV series

- Genre: Comedy
- Written by: Grahame Bond; Bill Harding; Rory O'Donoghue; Jude Kuring; Tim Gooding; Peter Bicevskis
- Directed by: Ted Robinson
- Starring: Grahame Bond; Rory O'Donoghue; Garry McDonald
- Country of origin: Australia
- Original language: English
- No. of episodes: 4

Original release
- Network: ABC TV
- Release: 21 March – 8 December 1975

Aunty Jack's Wollongong the Brave is a collection of four comedy specials derived from the Australian television series, The Aunty Jack Show. The fourth and final episode was the precursor to The Norman Gunston Show. The episodes were filmed in 1974 and were aired during 1975. The mini-series was released to DVD by the ABC in March 2007.

== Episodes ==
1. "Norman Gunston – The Golden Weeks"
  Wollongong superstar Norman Gunston is kidnapped near the Bulli Pass while conducting a coach tour of South Coast drive-ins. After Norman's mysterious disappearance, a TV station recalls his life and times, and his mother, childhood sweetheart and others closest to him pay tribute, in a documentary about Gunston's rise to fame in "the biggest southern hemisphere in the world". (First screened: 21 March 1975)
2. "Kev Kavanagh – Beyond the Infinite"
  Kev Kavanagh, meat artist, Butcher laureate, international meat fashion designer and meaty author, turns filmmaker in Australia's most adventurous film epic The History of Man. Kev traces the history of Man from primitive wanderer to cosmic explorer, and discovers that behind every great man in history was a butcher. Kev searches the world for the "essence of truth and butchery" which has been handed down through time by the great butchers. Kev Kavanagh then returns to his suburban home after years away as Australia's most creative talent, and finds things are not what they seem to be. (First screened: 23 May 1975)
3. "Aunty Jack 'n' The Gong in Bloody Concert"
  This show, set in a comic book, was filmed during the 1974 national tour. "Kid Eager wonders about the powers of Aunty Jack and plots to steal the Golden Glove." Included the songs "Rip Off", "Head of the Pack", "Heavyweight Boxer", "Queen of the Gong", "Aunty Jack 'N' the Gong" and "Farewell Aunty Jack". (First screened: 1 December 1975)
4. "The Farrelly Brothers – Three Men, a Sheep and Their Music"
  The Farrelly Brothers (Ernest, Ernie and Enzo), having captured the hearts of the world with their unique blend of music and their hit song "Set Another One Up to the Bar", the trio goes back to where it all began—"Dapto International Airport". Also includes Norman Gunston and Aunty Jack. (First screened: 8 December 1975)

== See also ==
- The Aunty Jack Show
  - Aunty Jack Introduces Colour
  - Aunty Jack Sings Wollongong
  - Farewell Aunty Jack
