= Norman Gunston =

Australian TV character created by Garry McDonald

- First appearance: 1973 (The Aunty Jack Show)
- Last appearance: 1993 (The Norman Gunston Show)
- Created by: Wendy Skelcher and Garry McDonald
- Portrayed by: Garry McDonald

In-universe information
- Nickname: The Little Aussie Bleeder
- Occupation: Television Reporter
- Nationality: Australian, (from Wollongong, New South Wales)

Norman Gunston is a satirical TV character performed by Australian actor and comedian Garry McDonald. Norman Gunston was primarily well known in his native Australia and, to a lesser extent, the United States during the mid- to late 1970s. He was the only Gold Logie–winning fictional character on Australian television, with McDonald collecting the 1976 Gold Logie and the George Wallace Memorial Logie for Best New Talent in character.

== Early years ==
The Gunston character was originally conceived for a sketch by comedy writer Wendy Skelcher in the second series of the cult Australian TV comedy series The Aunty Jack Show in 1973. Cast member Garry McDonald portrayed Gunston as a dull and talentless local TV reporter from the industrial city of Wollongong – a locale that was the butt of many jokes throughout the series. McDonald later claimed that the Gunston character and his show were devised as a parody of an (unintentionally bad) late-night Sydney TV variety show of the early 1970s hosted by expatriate American club entertainer Tommy Leonetti. In 1975, when The Norman Gunston Show was established as a successful comedy program, McDonald said:

I think you can say that Garry McDonald created Norman Gunston, my writer, Bill Harding, filled Gunston out, and our director, John Eastway, put Gunston in the 'Tonight' show concept.

McDonald claimed he'd created the name 'Norman Gunston' from an air stewardess who'd told off David Frost in McDonald's presence, changing it from "Norma Gunston" to Norman Gunston. In 2022 McDonald admitted he'd misheard the name as Norma, and that in reality she was "Lorna Gunston".

The Gunston character made enough of an impression in Aunty Jack for him to be revived in a subsequent comedy mini-series made by the Aunty Jack team, Wollongong the Brave (1974), in which he starred in a satirical mock documentary Norman Gunston: The Golden Weeks. His segments as Norman in What's on in Wollongong became one of the most popular parts of the Aunty Jack Show, and Norman appeared on the Aunty Jack Sings Wollongong album along with McDonald's other character, Kid Eager.

== National fame ==
In his later and most famous incarnation, Gunston had evolved to become the unlikely host of his own national TV variety show, The Norman Gunston Show, which premiered with a live broadcast on ABC television on 18 May 1975. Dubbed "the little Aussie bleeder" (a play on the term "Aussie battler"), he satirised parochial Australian culture, media "personalities" and egocentric talk show hosts.

After a faltering start, the Norman Gunston Show rapidly gained a huge national audience and the series became the pre-eminent Australian TV comedy program of its day, with McDonald winning a Gold Logie and having several pop hits. He is, notably, the only Logie recipient who has received the award in the name of his character rather than in his own name.

The series producer director was John Eastway.

=== Format ===
The Gunston show was a subversive parody of the established variety "Tonight Show" format, centring on a weekly roster of celebrity guests who were 'interviewed' by Norman. Genuine musical performances by guest stars were countered by Norman's own unique interpretations of popular songs – he specialised in portraying his lyrics through mime and sign language and frequently punctuated the song with 'dramatic' interjections. Among his memorable performances were his histrionic rendition of the Tom Jones hit "Delilah", his charades-like version of "Send in the Clowns" and his heroic interpretation of the Liza Minnelli's theme-song "Liza with a Z", which Norman back-announced by guilelessly expressing surprise at the fact that few singers except "Miss Lisa Minnulli" had ever attempted the song. McDonald is in real life an accomplished blues harmonica player (he jammed with Frank Zappa in an interview recording during Zappa's second Australian tour) and many of Norman's musical performances were regularly punctuated by poorly executed and inappropriate harmonica playing, such as in his rendition of the Billy Joel signature tune "Piano Man".

Norman's distinctive interview "shtick" included several recurring features. He habitually presented himself as ill-prepared and under-researched, seeming largely ignorant of and/or uninterested in his guests' achievements, although he was always quick to exploit any chance that their celebrity status might enable him to achieve one of his ambitions, such as being chosen to star in a cigarette ad (which he eventually achieved with 'Dukes' Cigarettes), or winning a Gold Logie.

Norman would further undercut his guests' star status by linking any aspect of their lives and careers to the most mundane features of his own life; he also habitually employed malapropisms and made a particular feature of mis-pronouncing stars' names, or apparently mistaking them for someone else. In his debut show he repeatedly referred to wealthy Sydney socialite Lady Fairfax as "Mrs Lady Fairfax" and in a later show he introduced progressive union leader Jack Mundey as "Mister Jack Mondaay" – a satirical inversion of the Australian habit of pronouncing the morphograph '-day' as '-dee' in the days of the week (e.g. "Sat'dee" for "Saturday").

As the series developed McDonald and his team introduced additional live and pre-taped segments including:

- "Norman's Dreamtime" – a mock-fairytale segment in which Gunston regaled a group of increasingly bored children with readings from a book of iconic Australian fables, with titles such as "Why Underpants Ride Up"
- "Consumer Straight Talk" – helpful tips on alternative uses for everyday household items, which later evolved into the even more grandiose-sounding "Spaceship Southern Hemisphere"
- a weekly review of the show's ratings over previous weeks, with suggestions on how viewers and the studio audience might help them skyrocket; later in Series 1 this focused on Norman's increasingly desperate campaign to win the coveted Gold Logie – which is, ironically, exactly what transpired at the 1976 Logies.
- in Series 2 Gunston presented (but did not appear in) a 3-minute satirical 'micro-soap' called Checkout Chicks, which parodied current Australian TV soap operas and starred actresses well known for their appearances in such programs, including Number 96 stars Abigail and Philippa Baker, Class of 74 star Anne Louise Lambert, who went on to star in Picnic at Hanging Rock (in which McDonald also appeared in a 'straight' role).

Stage settings were defiantly downmarket and rooted in Australian suburbia and kitsch RSL club stylings – after being introduced, bemused guests were offered their choice of dubious delicacies (such as pineapple doughnuts or the infamous Chiko Roll) from Norman's hot food bar, before being invited to sit on his vinyl-clad "night-and-day" (an Australian term for sofa bed). Perhaps the most memorable example of this was his interview of Edward Woodward and Michele Dotrice, during which he performed his version of Othello 'for the rugby leagues clubs', which involved him squirting tomato sauce over a ventriloquists's dummy, reducing Woodward to helpless laughter.

Gunston's personal appearance satirised club performers and TV interviewers of the time – for the studio segments he wore an ill-fitting blue lurex tuxedo jacket (wrongly buttoned) and the fly on his (too short) trousers was habitually left undone, with the shirt-tail poking out through the zip. Gunston also adopted a deliberately bad comb over hairstyle to partially cover his balding head. One of his visual trademarks was the small pieces of tissue paper applied to his pasty white face to cover supposed shaving cuts. This comic device led to his memorable exchange with visiting American actress Sally Struthers – noting Norman's apparent shaving cuts, she kindly suggested that perhaps Gunston should use an electric razor; the nonplussed Norman replied "Uh, I do", at which point Struthers collapsed in a fit of laughter.

Gunston performed subversive TV interviews with many major celebrities – during a Wings press conference he quipped to Linda McCartney: 'That's funny, you don't look Japanese.' (referencing Yoko Ono); other famous victims included Mick Jagger, Warren Beatty, Charlton Heston, and Muhammad Ali. Perhaps Norman's most well known interview was with Keith Moon at Charlton stadium in 1976. Moon famously ended his brief encounter with Norman by tipping Vodka over his head and yelling "Piss off, you Australian slag".

McDonald was one of the pioneers of the satirical "ambush" interview technique, which was founded on his considerable improvisational acting skills and precise comic timing. The "Gunston Method" relied on the fact that, especially in the early days of the series, the Norman persona was still relatively unknown in his home country, and completely unknown outside Australia. Thus, he was successfully able to hide behind the guise of a fully rounded and highly plausible character who appears to be stupid in order to throw his otherwise media-savvy quarry off their guard. This caused various results, from hilarity (Sally Struthers and Cheech and Chong), to clever play-alongs like Muhammad Ali ("I'm punchy – what's your excuse?") to bewilderment (Warren Beatty), to complete outrage (Rudolf Nureyev, Michael Cole).

The Gunston technique has since been employed by many comedians. In both style and appearance, Paul Kaye's character Dennis Pennis was strongly reminiscent of Gunston. It later had a very successful revival thanks to the British satirist Sacha Baron Cohen through his characters Ali G, Borat and Brüno. Canadian comedian and actor Martin Short also employed a similar technique with his best-known character, the fawning, morbidly obese celebrity interviewer Jiminy Glick; another notable resemblance between Glick and Norman is the Glick show's "fairytale" segment "Lalawood Fables", which is very similar to the "Norman's Dreamtime" segments of the Gunston show, in which the host reads a satirical mock-fable (intercut with pre-produced vision) to a group of assembled children. The Australian satirical comedy team The Chaser have also frequently used the Gunston Method to ambush unwitting targets—examples include the Julian Morrow character the "Citizens' Infringment Officer", and the team's now-legendary stunt in which they managed to penetrate a tight security cordon around the APEC Forum, despite the fact that Chas Licciardello was masquerading as Osama bin Laden.

Gunston was immortalised in Australian political history when, on the morning of 11 November 1975, McDonald and his film crew found out that the Labor government led by Gough Whitlam had just been dismissed by the Governor-General Sir John Kerr. On hearing the news, McDonald and his crew raced from Sydney to Parliament House in Canberra, where they were able to film McDonald (as Gunston) briefly addressing the assembled crowd, only moments before Whitlam and the Governor-General's Official Secretary David Smith appeared for the reading of the now-famous proclamation announcing Whitlam's dismissal.

In 1976, the ABC aired a third season of The Norman Gunston Show. By this stage, increased production budgets afforded Gunston more opportunities for overseas interviews, including Malcolm Muggeridge, Michael Caine, John Sturges, Glenda Jackson, John Stonehouse, and Rudolph Nureyev. One memorable encounter with Frank Zappa ended with Zappa and Norman duetting respectively on guitar and harmonica in a spontaneous blues jam (McDonald is in fact a proficient harmonica player). As the jam concluded, McDonald threw in a witty musical quote from the well-known ABC news theme, a nod to Zappa's well-known proclivity for inserting musical quotes such as TV themes into his work.

In November 1976, a specially prepared 45-minute UK Gunston TV special was screened on BBC2 TV. Some of Gunston's guests on the show included Diana Dors and Tony Greig.

After the third and final ABC TV season finished in late 1976, Gunston was popular enough to approach commercial TV networks. In particular, the Seven Network showed interest in producing another Norman Gunston series. Because of McDonald's other commitments, the series did not commence production until early 1978.

Between July–September 1977, Norman Gunston was included in the 8-episode ABC TV series, The Garry McDonald Show. Other characters were also played by McDonald, including Harry Butler, and Mo McCackie.

== Channel Seven years ==
In 1978, the Australian Seven Network aired another Norman Gunston series, which continued over an 18-month period till 1979. Ten 60-minute episodes were produced by John Eastway and ATN7. Highlights of this series were also screened on UK Channel 4 TV from November to December 1982.

In February 1981, Channel 7 began airing a program called Gunston's Australia, which intended to show the Gunston character approaching the end of his shelf life. In a satirical reference to personalities like former ABC current affairs host Bill Peach, the series parodied the perennial Australian TV practice of hiring celebrities to host magazine-style programs after leaving the show that had brought them to fame. Wearing a safari jacket and shorts, Gunston travelled around outback Australia, interfering and adventuring in high and low places in his usual cack-handed manner. However, due to underwhelming feedback and ratings, the series was removed from weekly schedules after only two episodes in Sydney, and five episodes in Melbourne. The remainder of the series was shown sporadically over the next two years in Sydney, with the final two episodes being shown in November 1982. In Melbourne, the final three episodes were not shown until four years later, in mid-1985.

Despite this, the series was purchased by the UK's Channel Four and screened in full in February and March 1983.

In 1985, a 2-hour video was released titled, The Gunston Tapes. This was a compilation of interviews and comic sketches from the first, second and third 1975–1976 ABC TV series. McDonald also temporarily revived the Gunston character for the purpose of narrating the video.

In February and March 1993, McDonald briefly revived the Gunston character for the Channel 7 network. However, by the time the series premiered McDonald was suffering from severe depression, and his much-publicised nervous breakdown and abrupt departure saw the series prematurely terminated. A 3-set DVD compilation of the 1993 series was subsequently released in 2003.

During the late 1990s, Foxtel's The Comedy Channel repeated all but the premiere episode from the 1975–1976 ABC series. (A previously unaired pilot was screened in place of episode one, which is presumed lost.) This marked the first time the series had been aired since the late 1970s. The same episodes have been screened again, albeit in random order, from 2008 as part of the channel's Aussie Gold block hosted by Frank Woodley.

== Discography ==
=== Studio albums ===
List of albums, with selected chart positions
Title	Album details	Peak chart positions
Title	Album details	AUS
Norman Gunston	Released: November 1976; Format: LP; Label: Lamington (LAM-4338)	40
Nylon Degrees	Released: September 1978; Format: LP; Label: Mushroom Records (L 36700)	78

=== Singles ===
List of singles, with selected chart positions
Year	Title	Peak chart positions
Year	Title	AUS
1976	"Salute to ABBA"/"Hors D'oeuvre"	9
1977	"I Might Be a Punk (But I Love You Baby)"	57
1978	"Howzat"/"Delilah"	-
1980	"Kiss Army"/"Normdrum"	13
1984	"Join the Dots"	-
1992	"Amigos Para Siempre (Friends for Life)" (with Effie)	27

== Awards ==
=== ARIA Music Awards ===
The ARIA Music Awards is an annual awards ceremony held by the Australian Recording Industry Association. They commenced in 1987.

Year	Nominee / work	Award	Result	Ref.
1993	"Amigos Para Siempre"/"Venereal Girl (Tribute to Madonna)" (with Effie)	Best Comedy Release	Nominated	

== Program history ==
- 1973 The Aunty Jack Show (ABC TV – six black and white episodes)
- 1974 Wollongong the Brave (ABC TV)
- 1975 The Norman Gunston Show – season 1 (ABC TV – nine 30-minute colour episodes)
- 1975 The Norman Gunston Show – season 2 (ABC TV – eight 30-minute colour episodes)
- 1976 The Norman Gunston Show – season 3 (ABC TV – eight 30-minute colour episodes)
- 1976 The Norman Gunston Show (UK BBC TV one-off 60-minute special)
- 1977 The Garry McDonald Show (ABC TV – eight 30-minute colour episodes)
- 1978–79 The Norman Gunston Show (Seven Network – ten 60-minute episodes)
- 1981 Gunston's Australia (Seven Network 1981 – eight 30-minute episodes)
- 1993 The Norman Gunston Show (Seven Network – five 30-minute episodes)

== 1975 season 1 ABC TV episodes ==
Series 1 episode 1 (18 May 1975)

- Premier Norman Gunston Show episode filmed at ABN2 Gore Hill, Sydney TV studios. Norman Gunston interviews Mary Fairfax, Kerrie Biddell, and Rolf Harris.

Series 1 episode 2 (May 1975)

- Norman Gunston interviews Prince Leonard and Lord Davies from the Hutt River Province, Western Australia; Rick Morosi (Junie Morosi's brother); Colleen Hewett before her departure overseas; Mrs Phillis Johnson; and Edward Woodward. Norman's dreamtime segment. Gunston concludes the show by performing "Keep You Satisfied".

Series 1 episode 3 (June 1975)

- Norman Gunston interviews Stratford Johns; Chelsea Brown; Mrs Andrea (local talk back radio personality); and Fred Nile. Norman's dreamtime: "How Josyln Mathew got her spots". Consumer straight talk: Chewing gum special report. Gunston concludes the show by performing "If (They Made Me a King)".

Series 1 episode 4 (June 1975)

- Norman Gunston interviews Ray Barrett; Edith Dahl, and Jack Thompson. Australian rock group Skyhooks perform "Horror Movie". Norman's dreamtime segment: "Why underpants ride up". Consumer straight talk: Venus flytrap.

Series 1 episode 5 (June 1975)

- Norman Gunston interviews Jack Mundey; Paul Graham, Warren Beatty. Australian harmonica performing trio, The Horrie Dargie Trio, perform Theme From "Shaft" by Isaac Hayes. Paul Graeme wrestles alligator. Gunston performs "Sweet Caroline".

Series 1 episode 6 (June 1975)

- Norman Gunston interviews the Carlton Football team in their dressing room; Mike Willesee; Marcia Hines; and Dr. Bertram Wainer. Gunston reports on "The joys of funny business". Gunston concludes show by performing "Liza with a Z".

Series 1 episode 7 (July 1975)

- Norman Gunston interviews Al Grassby; Bobbi Sykes; Little Pattie; and Cheech & Chong. Norman's dreamtime segment: "The beach umbrella finds Mr. Right". Consumer straight talk segment. Gunston closes show by performing "I Got You Babe" with Little Pattie.

Series 1 episode 8 (July 1975)

- Norman Gunston interviews Michele Dotrice; Edward Woodward; Beatrice Faust, and Peter Wherrett. Consumer straight talk segment: super shopping trolley reviewed by Peter Wherrett. Gunston closes show by performing "Out of Sight, Out of Mind".

Series 1 episode 9 (July 1975)

- Norman Gunston interviews Gary Glitter. Norman Gunstan stands outside Parliament House Canberra. Gunston performs "Here Come the Jets". Gunston promotional film for "Something or Other" brand cigarette commercial. Norman's nymphette 1975 competition final. Consumer straight talk – Norman's last eight video tapes. ABC chairman, Professor Downing announces new Norman Gunston series due to commence in early September 1975. Gunston concludes show by performing "Tomorrow Belongs to Me".

== 1975 season 2 ABC TV Episodes ==
Season Two featured recurring sketch, "The Checkout Chicks". This sketch, a send-up of melodramatic soap operas set in a supermarket, mostly featured former cast members of the then-popular serial Number 96: Abigail, Vivienne Garrett, Candy Raymond, Philippa Baker, Judy Lynne, Anne Louise Lambert.

Series 2 episode 1 (September 1975)

- Norman Gunston interviews Joe Frazier; Muhammad Ali, Lady Fairfax; and Winifred Atwell. Special report on GI cordial nutrition. Norman's $400,000 slice of the good life competition. Gunston commences show with "Colour my World" and concludes with "Pinball Wizard".

Series 2 episode 2 (September 1975)

- Norman Gunston interviews Ray Charles; Junie Morosi; Peter Allen; and Telly Savalas. Episode one of Checkout Chicks. Spaceship Southern Hemisphere incorporating consumer straight talk. Gunston concludes show with "Send in the Clowns".

Series 2 episode 3 (September 1975)

- Norman Gunston interviews Australian rock group Ayers Rock; Denise Drysdale; and President Nixon's security guard. Special announcement to the nation regarding Norman's false girlfriend. Norman's dreamtime: "Why the orange juice gets swished around in that glass thing". Junior jaws kitchen tidy bin review.

Series 2 episode 4 (September 1975) (Note: this episode only exists in black and white)

- Norman Gunston interviews Hugh Hefner, Don Dunstan, and Barry Crocker.

Series 2 episode 5 (October 1975)

- Norman Gunston interviews Renée Geyer; Paul and Linda McCartney; Denny Laine; and radio talk-back priest Fr. Jim McLaren. Special report on keeping pets in units.

Series 2 episode 6 (October 1975)

- Norman Gunston interviews John Gorton; The Seekers; and Miss Australia 1975; Sally Struthers. Checkout chicks. Special report on LA smog verses Australia smog. Gunston concludes show by performing Vesti La Giubba.

Series 2 episode 7 (December 1975)

- Norman Gunston interviews Debra Byrne; Senator Albert Field; Michael Cole; and Vidal Sassoon. Norman Gunston appears on the steps of Parliament House with Gough Whitlam – 11 November 1975. Gunston concludes show with "Delilah".

Series 2 episode 8 (January 1976)

- Norman Gunston interviews Edith Head; and Frank Zappa. Norman's dreamtime: "Why Aunty Pat took the kittens to the vet". Norman look alike awards 1975. Gunston concludes show with "I who have nothing".

== 1976 season 3 ABC TV Episodes ==
Series 3 episode 1 (September 1976)

- Norman Gunston interviews Malcolm Muggeridge; Frank Hardie; The Ink Spots; and Rudolf Nureyev. Gunston reports on the 1976 Montreal Olympic Games. Gunston concludes show with ABBA melody.

Series 3 episode 2

- Norman Gunston interviews Julie Ismay, Miss Australia 1976; Michael Caine; Brenda Kristen; Tim Taylor; and Tony Greig (from BBC2 UK special). Norman attempts to speak with UK prime minister. Special report on Cambridge University life. Gunston concludes show with "A taste of water".

Series 3 episode 3

- Norman Gunston interviews Australian Olympic team; Diana Trask; Margaret Fulton; and John Stonehouse. Norman's dreamtime: "How the garden hose got where it is today". Special report on storing food under the house. Gunston concludes show with "Howzat".

Series 3 episode 4

- Norman Gunston interviews 1976 ABC chairman; Fred Daley; and Glenda Jackson. 1976 budget report. Royal marines song contest. Norman will do his best segment: "How hundreds and thousands are made". Report on farming in your own flat. Gunston concludes show with "Don't tell me what to say".

Series 3 episode 5

- Norman Gunston interviews Leyland Brothers; John Sturgess; Donald Smith; and Mary Whitehouse. Gunston concludes show with "Jailhouse Rock".

Series 3 episode 6

- Norman Gunston interviews Jack Brabham; and Malcolm Fraser. Gunston concludes show with "Piano Man".

Series 3 episode 7

- Norman Gunston interviews Caroline Jones; Delilah; and Diana Dors (from BBC2 UK special). Marathon telethon 1976. Norman's dreamtime: "How the shaving cream gets in a lather". Gunston concludes show with duet with Delilah.

Series 3 episode 8

- Norman Gunston interviews Vera Lynn, Margaret Thatcher, and George Davis. Keith Moon pours vodka bottle over Norman's head.

== BBC2 1976 Norman Gunston special ==
(19 November 1976)

- Michael Caine, Diana Dors, Tony Greig, Glenda Jackson, Malcolm Muggeridge, Diane Solomon.

== 1978–1979 ATN7-produced Episodes ==
Series 1 episode 1 (5 April 1978)

- Interviews: Henry Winkler, Phil Silvers, Charles Collinson, Billy Carter. Guests include: John Singleton, and Colleen Hewett.

Series 1 episode 2 (1978)

- Interviews: James Garner, James Franciscus, Robert Stack, Elke Sommer. Guests includes: Bob Simpson, Judy Connelly, 'Saturday Night Fever' take off.

Series 1 episode 3 (1978)

- Interviews: Dawn Fraser, Molly Meldrum, John Farnham and Martin Landau.

Series 1 episode 4 (11 October 1978)

Series 1 episode 5 (1978)

Series 2 episode 1 (1979)

Series 2 episode 2 (1979)

Series 2 episode 3 (29 August 1979)

Series 2 episode 4 (1979)

Series 2 episode 5 Xmas special (December 1979)

- Summary: Norman Gunston's Christmas special includes take off of Blondies' single "Heart of Glass"; interviews with Karen Black; Lee Marvin; hippies in Haight-Ashbury, San Francisco; Leif Garrett; Elliott Gould; Henry Winkler; Ed Asner; George Segal; Zsa Zsa Gabor; Ricky Schroder; the Bee Gees; Robert Stigwood. Also shows Norman Gunston doing songs "Use Your Hanky" and a take-off of the "Rocky" theme.

== Gunston's Australia 1981 ATN7-produced episodes ==
Series 1 episode 1 (19 February 1981 [Melbourne]; 25 February 1981 [Sydney])

- Summary: Norman tries to break into a top-secret Space Research Station - and tries a spot of bush-trekking.

Series 1 episode 2 (26 February 1981 [Melbourne]; 25 February 1981 [Sydney])

- Summary: Norman fails to interview his country's Prime Minister but he does meet a royal prince as he continues his zany investigation of his native land.

Series 1 episode 3 (5 March 1981 [Melbourne]; 21 March 1981 [Sydney])

- Summary: Our Norm tries a spot of sheep-shearing, goes mining for copper, gets involved with some lady mud-wrestlers, and irons his parachute.

Series 1 episode 4 (12 March 1981 [Melbourne]; 21 March 1981 [Sydney])

- Summary: Norman goes crop dusting - with a feather duster, flies to an oil rig for a holiday, attempts the world's land-speed record on foot, and makes an impassioned appeal for conservation.

Series 1 episode 5 (19 March 1981 [Melbourne]; 20 March 1982 [Sydney])

- Summary: Norman visits a fake ski-resort, tries to Climb Every Mountain, investigates an opal mine, watches toad racing and takes on cattle drovers in a cowboy epic.

Series 1 episode 6 (22 June 1985 [Melbourne]; 20 March 1982 [Sydney])

- Summary: Norm visits some Australian gold fields, oversees a cattle drive in lorries, investigates an inland lake with a difference - no water - and visits a house of ill-repute to get his ironing done.

Series 1 episode 7 (6 July 1985 [Melbourne]; 14 November 1982 [Sydney])

- Summary: Norman visits cyclone-torn Darwin, sings his version of the Banana Boat Song, fails to meet Lee Marvin, and tries some wine tasting.

Series 1 episode 8 (13 July 1985 [Melbourne]; 14 November 1982 [Sydney])

- Summary: Norman tries to attend the opening of Parliament, gets involved in a rodeo, interviews a mother ant and provides his own version of the song Grease.

== The Norman Gunston Show (1993) ==
(Seven Network – February to March 1993)

Episode 1

- Shirley MacLaine, Ian Botham, leader of the opposition Dr John Hewson, musical guest Girlfriend, Gunston sings "Achy Breaky Heart"

Episode 2

- Paul Mercurio, Billy Crystal, Julian Clary, musical guest Sonia Dada, Gunston sings "Simply Irresistible"

Episode 3

- Guns N' Roses, Lionel Richie, Laurie and Noeline Donaher, musical guest Mahotella Queens, Gunston sings "I Will Always Love You"

Episode 4 (hosted by Mary Coustas as Effie)

- Prime minister Paul Keating, Bryan Brown, actor Sam Neill, former prime minister Gough Whitlam, Warwick and Joanne Capper, Brian Austin Green, musical guests The Dukes

Episode 5 (hosted by Mary-Anne Fahey as "Kylie Mole")

- Jeff Fenech, Jane Flemming, Corbin Bernsen, Colonel Tom Parker, musical guest Peter Andre

Episode 6 (Top Gunston part 1)

- repackaged highlights from previous series

Episode 7 (Top Gunston part 2)

- repackaged highlights from previous series
