= Garry McDonald =

Australian actor, satirist and comedian

Garry McDonald AO
- Born: Garry George McDonald; 30 October 1948 (age 78); Bondi, New South Wales, Australia
- Education: National Institute of Dramatic Art (BFA)
- Occupations: Comedian; TV host; actor; satirist; activist
- Years active: 1967–present
- Known for: Character of Norman Gunston
- Spouse: Diane Craig (m. 1971)
- Awards: Gold Logie

Garry George McDonald AO (born 30 October 1948) is an Australian comedian, television host, actor, satirist and mental health activist. In a career spanning six decades he has had many theatre, television and film roles, and has been listed as a National Living Treasure. He is best known as the seemingly naive celebrity interviewer Norman Gunston, through whom he pioneered the "ambush interviewer" technique since followed by many others. He received a Gold Logie award for the television Norman Gunston Show in which he developed the character and is a Logie Hall of Fame inductee. He is also remembered for his role as the hapless Arthur Beare in the television sitcom Mother and Son, and numerous supporting roles in feature films.

Appointed an Officer of the Order of Australia in 2003 for service to the community in the mental health field and to the arts as an entertainer, he has been a board member of the Australian mental health organisation Beyond Blue.

== Early life ==
McDonald was born in the Sydney beachside suburb of Bondi in 1948. He was educated at Cranbrook School. During his time at Cranbrook, McDonald developed an interest in acting and, despite family objections, went on to study at the National Institute of Dramatic Art (NIDA), where he was awarded a Diploma in Acting in 1967.

== Career ==
=== Norman Gunston ===
It was while working on The Aunty Jack Show in 1973, that McDonald first performed the character for which he became best-known, the gauche and inept TV personality Norman Gunston. Gunston's first appearance was in a series of brief sketches which saw him reporting uncomfortably on a "sex-scandal drought" in Wollongong; a drought he eventually breaks by appearing naked on camera.

McDonald further developed the character in the Norman Gunston Show, for which he won a Gold Logie. Gunston's trademark look included a comb over, makeup to make his face deathbed white, and bits of tissue drying on shaving nicks. The series, which satirised many aspects of Australian culture and show business, was a mixture of live and pre-recorded interviews, awkward musical segments – excruciatingly sung by Gunston himself in the broadest "strine" accent – and continuing comedy sketches such as "Norman's Dreamtime" (in which Norman read stories to a group of children, such as "Why Underpants Ride Up").

Using Gunston's gormless personality as a cover to break down the defences of his "victims", McDonald pioneered the satirically provocative 'ambush interview' technique which was used to great effect in interviews with Paul McCartney, Muhammad Ali, Keith Moon, Leif Garrett, Sally Struthers and Elton John.

As Norman Gunston, McDonald also had a recording career, releasing a string of satirical pop parody records. Gunston's Top 40 hits included his interpretation of the Tom Jones classic "Delilah", the punk rock send-up "I Might Be A Punk But I Love You, Baby" and "KISS Army", a parody of the Kiss single "I Was Made For Loving You". He also appeared onstage with Frank Zappa & The Mothers of Invention at the Hordern Pavilion in Sydney on 20 January 1976, playing harmonica on "The Torture Never Stops". This performance was later released on the 2002 live album FZ:OZ.

=== Mother and Son ===
McDonald played Arthur Beare in the television series Mother and Son, starring alongside Ruth Cracknell over six seasons from 1984 until 1994. He won the 1994 Gold Logie for his role in the show.

=== Offspring ===
McDonald joined the cast of the drama series Offspring in 2012 (season 3) and was a series regular. He played Doctor Philip Noonan.

== Personal ==
Early in his career he met his wife, actress Diane Craig, during a production of Let's Get a Divorce. They married in 1971. They have two grown children and live in Berry on the New South Wales south coast.

Suffering from both depression and anxiety, McDonald talks openly about his condition. He is an ambassador and former board director of Beyond Blue, an Australian national depression initiative. He also serves as patron of the New South Wales branch of the Anxiety Disorders Foundation of Australia. McDonald is quoted in the press discussing a link between his own anxiety and that of his grandfather and mother.

McDonald's condition first came to the public's attention when he reached a crisis point after a short-lived attempt to revive the Gunston character in 1993. Then again in 1997, McDonald suffered a severe episode during the launch of a new series, Rip Snorters. McDonald's condition also caused him to withdraw from the 2003 production of Patrick Marber's Howard Katz.

== Filmography ==
=== Film ===
Year	Title	Role	Type
2016	The Light Between Oceans	William "Bill" Graysmark	Feature film
2012	Being Venice	Arthur	Feature film
2011	Burning Man	Dr Burgess	Feature film
2010	Don't Be Afraid of the Dark	Emerson Blackwood	Feature film
2009	A Model Daughter: The Killing of Caroline Byrne	Tony Byrne	TV film
2007	The King	Nicky Whitta	TV film
2006	BlackJack: Dead Memory	James	TV film
2006	Stepfather of the Bride	Ari	TV film
2005	Marti’s Party	Martin	Short film
2003	The Rage in Placid Lake	Doug Lake	Feature film
2002	Rabbit-Proof Fence	Mr. Neal	Feature film
2001	Moulin Rouge!	The Doctor	Feature film
2000	Mr. Accident	Kelvin Chevalier	Feature film
1990	Struck By Lightning	Ollie Rennie	Feature film
1987	Ghosts Can Do It	Max Falcon	Feature film
1987	The Place at the Coast	Dan Burroughs	Feature film
1985	Wills & Burke	Robert O'Hara Burke	Feature film
1985	Banduk	Mr Kool	TV film
1982	Molly	Jones	Feature film
1982	Ginger Meggs	John Meggs	Feature film
1982	The Pirate Movie	Sergeant/Inspector	Feature film
1977	The Picture Show Man	Lou	Feature film
1975	Games for Parents and Other Children		TV film
1975	Picnic at Hanging Rock	Constable Jones	Feature film
1974	Stone	Bike Mechanic	Feature film
1973	Avengers of the Reef	Updike's Aide	Feature film
1969	You Can't See 'round Corners	One of Terry's gang (uncredited)	Feature film
1967	The Quatermass Experiment (NIDA remake)		TV film

=== Television ===
Year	Title	Role	Type
TBA	Fear of Life	Self	Documentary
2022	The ABC Of	Self	TV series
2015–17	Stop Laughing This is Serious		TV series, 5 episodes
2012	Rake	Lawrence Fenton	TV series, 1 episode
2012	Offspring	Phillip Noonan	TV series, 33 episodes
2009	Talking Heads		TV series
2006	Two Twisted	Norm	TV series, 1 episode
2004	Enough Rope with Andrew Denton		TV series
2004	The Incredible Journey of Mary Bryant	Reverend Johnson	Miniseries, 2 episodes
2002	Bad Cop, Bad Cop	Howard Mayes	Miniseries, 1 episode
2001–20	Australian Story	Self / Norman Gunston	TV series, 5 episodes
2000	Love is a Four Letter Word	Tom Mattingly	TV series, 8 episodes
1999	All Saints	Dave Armstrong	TV series, 2 episodes
1999	Chuck Finn	Tony Rigatoni	TV series, 1 episode
1999	Halifax f.p.	Alex Goodson	TV series, Episode: Someone You Know
1998	Medivac	Ernie Sharp	TV series, 4 episodes
1996	Rip Snorters	Host	TV series
1996	Fallen Angels	Malcolm Lucas	TV series, 20 episodes
1996	Fire	Detective Mike Lucas	TV series, 2 episodes (Season 2)
1994	G.P.	Garry 'Gazza' Weller	TV series, 1 episode
1993	Woman in a Lampshade		
1992	The Other Side of Paradise	Johnson	Miniseries, 4 episodes
1991–93	Eggshells	Frank Rose	TV series
1989	A Funny Thing Happened to Australian Comedy	Self	TV special
1986	Counting from Six		
1985	News Free Zone		TV series
1985	Winners	Brooks	TV series, 1 episode
1984–94	Mother and Son	Arthur Beare	TV series, 42 episodes
1984	Five Mile Creek	Simon Galt	TV series, 1 episode
1984	Prime Time		TV series
1984	Onstage America	Norman Gunston / Self	TV series, 4 episodes
1982	Spring & Fall	Max Lawrence	TV series, 1 episode
1981	Gunston's Australia	Norman Gunston	TV series
1981	Jimmy Dancer		
1977	The Of Show	Various characters	TV series, 7 episodes
1977	The Garry McDonald Show	Self, Norman Gunston, Various	TV series, 8 episodes
1975–79	The Norman Gunston Show	Norman Gunston	TV series, 18 episodes
1975	Wollongong the Brave	Kid Eager	Miniseries, 4 episodes
1974–75	Matlock Police	Stan Smith, Sid Hawkins, Donny Skinner	TV series, 3 episodes
1974	Flash Nick from Jindavick	Captain Magpie	Miniseries, 4 episodes
1974	Division 4	Rev Gareth Davis	TV series, 1 episode
1974	Homicide	Davo	TV series, 1 episodes
1973	The Comedy Game		TV series, 2 episodes
1973	The Aunty Jack Show	Kid Eager / Norman Gunston	TV series, 8 episodes
1973	Over There		TV series, 2 episodes
1973	A Brace and a Bit		
1972	Snake Gully with Dad and Dave	Dave Rudd	TV series, 8 episodes
1968	Hunter	Ebeling	TV series, 1 episode
1967	You Can't See 'Round Corners	Young Man	TV series, 1 episode

== Theatre ==
Year	Title	Role	Type
2008–09	Guys and Dolls	Nathan Detroit	Princess Theatre & Capitol Theatre, Sydney
2010	Halpern and Johnson	Dennis Johnson	
2011	November		South Australian State Theatre Company
2011	Don's Party		
2010	The Grenade		
2006	The Give and Take		
2005	Two Brothers		
2004	Amigos	Stephen	Drama Theatre, Sydney Opera House
2002	Laughter on the 23rd Floor		
2001	Stones in His Pockets	Director	
2001	Up For Grabs		
1998	After the Ball		
1997	Little Shop of Horrors		
1997	Emerald City		
1994	Hotspur		
1987	Sugar Babies		
	Glengarry Glen Ross		
	Floating World		
	Uncle Vanya		
	Who's Afraid of Virginia Woolf?		

== Awards and honours ==
In 2003, McDonald was appointed an officer of the Order of Australia for service to the community by raising awareness of mental health issues and the effects of anxiety disorders and depression on sufferers and carers, and to the arts as an entertainer.

His popularity among Australians is reflected in his being listed, after public nomination and vote, as a National Living Treasure, someone who has made an outstanding contribution to Australian society in any field of human endeavour.

In 2015, he was a featured subject on the ABC documentary series Australian Story.

In 2020, he appeared on a stamp in the Australia Post Legends of Comedy series.

=== Awards ===
Year	Award	Category	Result	Work	Ref.
1976	Logie Award	New Talent	Won	The Norman Gunston Show	
1976	Logie Award	Gold Logie	Won	The Norman Gunston Show	
1991	Sydney Film Critics Award	Best Actor	Won	Struck by Lightning	
1994	Logie Award	Most Outstanding Actor	Won	Mother and Son	
1997	National Trust of Australia	National Living Treasure	Awarded	Garry McDonald	
1997	Logie Award	Hall of Fame	Won	Garry McDonald	
2004	Mo Award	Male Actor of the Year	Won	Garry McDonald	

== Art portraits ==
Two portraits of McDonald have won awards at the Archibald Prize. In 1999 a portrait by artist Deny Christian won the Packing Room Prize and, in 2006, Paul Jackson's All the world's a stage won the Peoples Choice Award. In 2016, yet another painting of McDonald was a finalist in the Archibald Prize by Kirsty Neilson entitled There's No Humour in Darkness.
