= Peter Weir filmography =

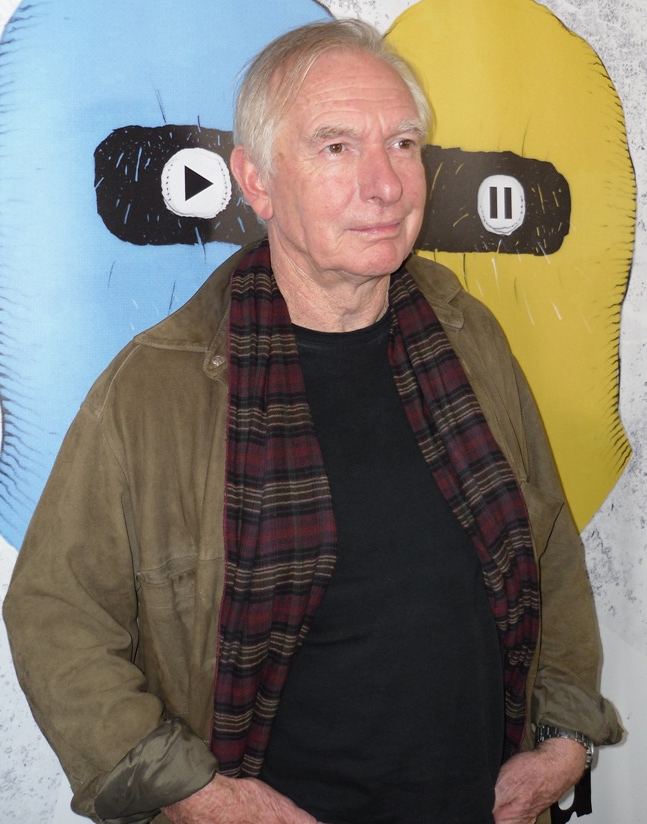
Weir in April 2011

Peter Weir is an Australian film director. He was a leading figure in the Australian New Wave cinema movement (1970–1990), with films such as the mystery drama Picnic at Hanging Rock (1975), the supernatural thriller The Last Wave (1977) and the historical drama Gallipoli (1981). The climax of Weir's early career was the $6 million multi-national production The Year of Living Dangerously (1983).

After the success of The Year of Living Dangerously, Weir directed a diverse group of American and international films covering most genres—many of them major box office hits—including Academy Award-nominated films such as the thriller Witness (1985), the drama Dead Poets Society (1989), the romantic comedy Green Card (1990), the social science fiction comedy-drama The Truman Show (1998) and the epic historical drama Master and Commander: The Far Side of the World (2003). For his work on these five films, Weir personally accrued six Academy Award nominations as either a director, writer or producer.

Since 2003, Weir's productivity has declined, having directed only one subsequent feature, the critically acclaimed box-office flop The Way Back (2010).

== Feature films ==
Year	Title	Director	Writer	Producer
1971	Homesdale	Yes	Yes	No
1974	The Cars That Ate Paris	Yes	Yes	No
1975	Picnic at Hanging Rock	Yes	No	No
1977	The Last Wave	Yes	Yes	No
1979	The Plumber	Yes	Yes	No
1981	Gallipoli	Yes	Yes	No
1982	The Year of Living Dangerously	Yes	Yes	No
1985	Witness	Yes	No	No
1986	The Mosquito Coast	Yes	No	No
1989	Dead Poets Society	Yes	No	No
1990	Green Card	Yes	Yes	Yes
1993	Fearless	Yes	No	No
1998	The Truman Show	Yes	No	No
2003	Master and Commander: The Far Side of the World	Yes	Yes	Yes
2010	The Way Back	Yes	Yes	Yes

== Short films ==
Year	Title	Director	Producer	Writer	Notes
1968	The Life and Times of the Reverend Buckshotte	Yes	Yes	No	
1968	Count Vim's Last Exercise	Yes	Yes	No	
1970	Stirring the Pool	Yes	No	No	
1971	Michael	Yes	No	Yes	Segment of 3 to Go
1972	The Field Day	Yes	No	No	
1972	The Computer Centre	Yes	No	No	
1972	The Billiard Room	Yes	No	No	
1972	Boat Building	Yes	No	No	
1975	Three Workshop Films	Yes	No	No	

== Documentary ==
Year	Title	Director	Producer	Notes
1973	Whatever Happened to Green Valley?	Yes	Yes	
1972	Incredible Floridas	Yes	No	Documentary short
1972	3 Directions in Australian Pop Music: Australian Colour Diary 43	Yes	No	Documentary short

== Television ==
Year	Title	Director	Producer	Writer	Notes
1968	Count Vim's Last Exercise	Yes	Yes	No	TV short
1969	Man on a Green Bike	Yes	Yes	No	TV movie
1971	The Comedy Game	No	No	Yes	Episode "Aunty Jack's Travelling Show"
1972-1973	The Aunty Jack Show	No	No	Yes	4 episodes
1973	The Very Best of 'The Aunty Jack Show'	No	No	Yes	TV special
1976	Luke's Kingdom	Yes	No	No	Episodes "The Dam and the Damned" and "A Man Worse Than Cormac"
1979	The Plumber	Yes	Yes	Yes	TV movie
