= List of awards and nominations received by Peter Weir =

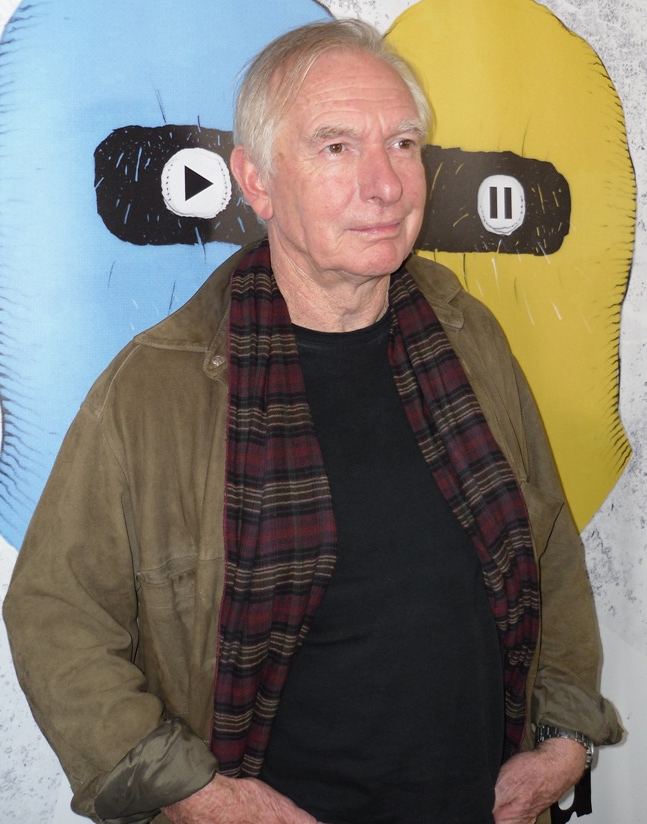
Weir in April 2011

This article presents the awards and nominations of Australian film director, film producer and writer Peter Weir. Weir has won 30 awards from 42 nominations.

== Academy Awards ==
Year	Nominated work	Category	Result
1986	Witness	Best Director	Nominated
1990	Dead Poets Society	Best Director	Nominated
1991	Green Card	Best Original Screenplay	Nominated
1999	The Truman Show	Best Director	Nominated
2004	Master and Commander: The Far Side of the World	Best Picture	Nominated
2004	Master and Commander: The Far Side of the World	Best Director	Nominated
2022	—	Honorary Award	Honoured

== British Academy Film Awards ==
Year	Nominated work	Category	Result
1986	Witness	Best Film	Nominated
1990	Dead Poets Society	Best Film	Nominated
1990	Dead Poets Society	Best Director	Nominated
1992	Green Card	Best Original Screenplay	Nominated
1999	The Truman Show	Best Director	Won
2004	Master and Commander: The Far Side of the World	Best Film	Nominated
2004	Master and Commander: The Far Side of the World	Best Director	Won

== Golden Globe Awards ==
Year	Nominated work	Category	Result
1982	Gallipoli	Best Foreign Language Film	Nominated
1986	Witness	Best Director	Nominated
1990	Dead Poets Society	Best Director	Nominated
1999	The Truman Show	Best Director	Nominated
2004	Master and Commander: The Far Side of the World	Best Director	Nominated
2004	Master and Commander: The Far Side of the World	Best Motion Picture – Drama	Nominated

== Australian Academy of Cinema and Television Arts ==
Year	Nominated work	Category	Result
1971	Homesdale	Best Director	Won
1975	Picnic at Hanging Rock	Best Director	Nominated
1977	The Last Wave	Best Director	Nominated
1981	Gallipoli	Best Director	Won
1982	The Year of Living Dangerously	Best Director	Nominated

== Saturn Awards ==
Year	Nominated work	Category	Result
1977	The Last Wave	Best Director	Nominated
1998	The Truman Show	Best Director	Nominated

== Other Awards ==
Year	Award	Category	Title	Result
1974	Chicago International Film Festival	Best Feature	The Cars That Ate Paris	Nominated
1976	Taormina Arte Award	Golden Charybdis	Picnic at Hanging Rock	Won
1978	Avoriaz Fantastic Film Festival	Special Jury Award	The Last Wave	Won
1981	Australian Film Institute	Best Director	Gallipoli	Won
1981	Venice Film Festival	Golden Lion	Gallipoli	Nominated
1983	Australian Film Institute	Best Director	The Year of Living Dangerously	Nominated
1983	Australian Film Institute	Best Adapted Screenplay	The Year of Living Dangerously	Nominated
1983	Australian Film Institute	Jury Award	The Year of Living Dangerously	Nominated
1983	Cannes Film Festival	Palme d'Or	The Year of Living Dangerously	Nominated
1984	Writers Guild of America	Best Drama	The Year of Living Dangerously	Nominated
1985	Hochi Film Festival	Best Foreign Film	Witness	Won
1986	Blue Ribbon Awards	Best Foreign Film	Witness	Won
1986	Directors Guild of America	Best Director	Witness	Nominated
1986	Kinema Junpo Awards	Best Foreign Film	Witness	Won
1990	Australian Film Institute	Raymond Longford Award	Dead Poets Society	Won
1990	David di Donatello Awards	Best Foreign Film	Dead Poets Society	Won
1990	David di Donatello Awards	Best Foreign Director	Dead Poets Society	Nominated
1990	Directors Guild of America	Best Director	Dead Poets Society	Nominated
1990	Italian National Syndicate of Film Journalists	Best Director	Dead Poets Society	Won
1990	Warsaw International Film Festival	Audience Award	Dead Poets Society	Won
1991	Writers Guild of America	Best Screenplay	Green Card	Nominated
1991	Argentinean Film Critics Association Awards	Best Foreign Film	Dead Poets Society	Nominated
1991	César Awards	Best Foreign Film	Dead Poets Society	Won
1991	Guild of German Art House Cinemas	Best Foreign Film	Dead Poets Society	Won
1994	Berlin International Film Festival	Gold Berlin Bear	Fearless	Nominated
1998	European Film Awards	Screen International Award	The Truman Show	Won
1998	Hamburg Film Festival	Guild Film Award		Won
1998	Valladolid International Film Festival	Golden Spike	The Truman Show	Nominated
1999	Australian Film Institute	Best Foreign Film	The Truman Show	Nominated
1999	Chicago Film Critics Association	Best Director	The Truman Show	Nominated
1999	Directors Guild of America	Best Director	The Truman Show	Nominated
1999	Florida Film Critics Circle	Best Director	The Truman Show	Won
1999	Fotogramas de Plata	Best Foreign Film	The Truman Show	Won
1999	Hugo Awards	Best Dramatic Presentation	The Truman Show	Won
1999	Italian National Syndicate of Film Journalists	Best Foreign Director	The Truman Show	Nominated
1999	London Film Critics' Circle	Director of the Year	The Truman Show	Won
1999	Online Film Critics Society Awards	Best Director	The Truman Show	Nominated
1999	Robert Festival	Best American Film	The Truman Show	Won
1999	Southeastern Film Critics Association	Best Director	The Truman Show	Nominated
2000	Taormina International Film Festival	Taormina Arte Award		Won
2001	Australian Directors Guild	Outstanding Achievement Award		Won
2001	Australian Screen Directors' Association	Outstanding Achievement Award		Won
2003	Britannia Awards	Artistic Excellence		Won
2003	Camerimage	Best Director		Won
2003	Washington DC Area Film Critics Association	Best Director	Master and Commander: The Far Side of the World	Nominated
2003	Washington DC Area Film Critics Association	Best Screenplay	Master and Commander: The Far Side of the World	Nominated
2004	Broadcast Film Critics Association	Passion in Film	Master and Commander: The Far Side of the World	Won
2004	Chicago Film Critics Association	Best Director	Master and Commander: The Far Side of the World	Won
2004	David di Donatello Awards	Best Foreign Film	Master and Commander: The Far Side of the World	Nominated
2004	Directors Guild of America	Best Director	Master and Commander: The Far Side of the World	Nominated
2004	Empire Awards	Best Director	Master and Commander: The Far Side of the World	Nominated
2004	London Film Critics' Circle	Screenwriter of the Year	Master and Commander: The Far Side of the World	Won
2004	London Film Critics' Circle	Director of the Year	Master and Commander: The Far Side of the World	Nominated
2004	PGA Awards	Outstanding Producer	Master and Commander: The Far Side of the World	Nominated
2004	Phoenix Film Critics Society	Best Director	Master and Commander: The Far Side of the World	Nominated
2004	Phoenix Film Critics Society	Best Screenplay	Master and Commander: The Far Side of the World	Nominated
2004	USC Scripter Award	USC Scripter Award	Master and Commander: The Far Side of the World	Nominated
2024	Venice Film Festival	Golden Lion for Lifetime Achievement		Honoured
