= Jenny Lovell =

Australian actress

- Occupations: Actress; theatre manager; producer; director
- Known for: Prisoner also known as Prisoner: Cell Block H
- Parent(s): Nigel Lovell (father), Patricia Lovell (mother)

Jenny Lovell is an Australian theatre, television and film actress, and drama teacher, probably best known for her stint as Jenny Hartley in 44 episodes in the television series Prisoner. She is the daughter of Sydney actor and producer Nigel Lovell and actor and producer Patricia Lovell.

Lovell made her film debut in Picnic at Hanging Rock in 1975 and also appeared in the film Gallipoli, small screen appearances including four episodes of the soap opera A Country Practice and the police drama Blue Heelers, and a role in the horror film Darkness Falls (2003). Lovell has performed internationally including at The Globe Theatre, London.

Lovell was the inaugural General Manager of Impro Melbourne, an improvisational theatre (improv) company founded in 1996 in Melbourne, Australia. During her time with the company, Lovell produced, directed and starred in various improv formats, including many seasons of competition in Theatresports, when it was hosted at the Theatre Works independent theatre in St Kilda, Melbourne.

== Filmography ==
Year	Title	Role	Notes
1975	Picnic at Hanging Rock	Blanche	
1981	Gallipoli	Waitress	
1982, 1984	A Country Practice	Pregnant Woman, Catherine	4 episodes
1985	Prisoner	Jenny Hartley	44 episodes
1985	I Can't Get Started	Debbie	
1990	The Money or the Gun		Episode: "The Year of the Patronising Bastard"
1996	Mercury	Bronwyn	Episode: "Biggest Thieves in Town"
1997	Good Guys, Bad Guys: Only the Young Die Good	Mrs. Maloney	Television film
1997–98	Blue Heelers	Gail Russell	4 episodes
2000	Halifax f.p.	Mrs. Anderson	Episode: "The Spider and the Fly"
2003	Darkness Falls	Nurse Alex	
2003	MDA	Mrs. Trantor	Episode: "A Closer Walk"
2009	Tomboys	Naomi's Mother	
2014	The Salsa Plays	Sue	Television film
2014	Bound by Blue	Penelope	
2019	Neighbours	Fiona Bennett	Episode: "Episode #1.8048" with Betty Bobbitt, Jane Clifton and Jentah Sobott
