= Patricia Lovell =

Australian film producer and actress

Patricia Lovell AM, MBE
- Patricia Lovell, appearing as Miss. Pat in the ABC children's series Mr. Squiggle
- Born: Patricia Anna Parr; 1929; Sydney, New South Wales, Australia
- Died: 26 January 2013 (aged 83)
- Other name: Miss Pat
- Occupations: Film producer, actress
- Family: Jenny Lovell (daughter), Nigel Lovell (husband, actor) (born;1916- died 2001, married 1956)

Patricia Anna Lovell AM MBE (née Parr; 1929 – 26 January 2013) was an Australian film producer and actress who received the Raymond Longford Award in 2004 from the Australian Film Institute (AFI). Her productions include 1975's Picnic at Hanging Rock, and Gallipoli, which received an AFI Award in 1982 as Best Film.

== Early life and career ==
Lovell was born in Sydney, New South Wales, in either Artarmon or Willoughby, the second child, and first daughter, of Letitia Evelyn (née Forsyth) (5 January 1906 – 21 April 1986) and Harold George Parr (1901 – 23 March 1970), an optometrist. During her childhood three of her five siblings died, including one who was quite ill at birth and died at 18 months, and her parents divorced. She attended Presbyterian Ladies' College, Armidale, but "didn't do well in the Leaving at all" and failed to get a university pass.

She began her career in radio at the Australian Broadcasting Commission (ABC) in the early 1950s, becoming a junior broadcaster in children's programs. That led to her joining the cast of the Children's Session. Despite the pressure of live television and having no formal training, she started making weekly appearances on ABC Children's TV, and in 1960 began her most fondly-remembered role as 'Miss Pat' (Note: A sobriquet given by her puppet costar, reminiscent of the famous English stage actress 'Mrs. Pat' (Campbell).) in ABC TV's children's television program Mr. Squiggle.

In 1964, Lovell became what she characterised as "one of the minor beauties" on the panel of Beauty and the Beast. When ATN-7's early morning Sydney Today show began in 1969 she and Bruce Webster were its co-presenters, and it was there as an interviewer that she met Peter Weir, the director with whom she would produce her two best-known films, Picnic at Hanging Rock and Gallipoli. In 1988, she and Mel Gibson formed a film production company "Lovell Gibson", but it was dissolved without making a film.

== Later career ==
Lovell worked as Head of Producing at the Australian Film, Television and Radio School (AFTRS) between 1996 and 2003.

== Personal life ==
Parr met her future husband, actor Nigel Lovell (1916–2001), through the Metropolitan Theatre in Sydney. He was a widower with a daughter. They married in 1956, and had two children, Simon Lovell, a helicopter pilot, and Jenny Lovell, an actor known for her role on the soap opera Prisoner (called Prisoner: Cell Block H in the UK and the USA). The couple eventually divorced.

Lovell died on 26 January 2013 from liver cancer, aged 83.

== Filmography ==
=== Film ===
- Picnic at Hanging Rock (1975)
- Break of Day (1976)
- Summerfield (1977)
- Gallipoli (1981)
- Monkey Grip (1982)
- The Perfectionist (1987)

=== Television ===
- Skippy the Bush Kangaroo
- Mr. Squiggle (1960) as Miss Pat
- Beauty and the Beast (1964) as one of the Beauties
- Sydney Today (1969) as Co-presenter
- Tosca: A Tale of Love and Torture (2000 TV documentary)

== Honours ==
Pat Lovell was appointed a Member of the Order of the British Empire (MBE) in the 1978 New Year's Honours. In the 1986 Queen's Birthday Honours she was appointed a Member of the Order of Australia (AM).
