= Max Pirkis =

British actor and film executive (born 1989)

- Born: 6 January 1989 (age 37); London, England, United Kingdom
- Occupation: Actor
- Years active: 2002–present
- Awards: Evening Standard British Film Award for Most Promising Newcomer 2003 Master and Commander: The Far Side of the World; Young Artist Award for Best Young Actor in an International Film 2003 Master and Commander: The Far Side of the World

Max Pirkis (born 6 January 1989) is an English actor and film executive. After appearing in two stage productions during the early 2000s, Pirkis made his film debut in Master and Commander: The Far Side of the World (2003). Pirkis received critical praise for his performance, winning the Evening Standard British Film Award for Most Promising Newcomer and the Young Artist Award for Best Young Actor in an International Film. In 2005, he was cast in the BBC/HBO television series Rome as Gaius Octavian, a role he held for two years.

After attending university, Pirkis transitioned to the business side of the film industry working as head of acquisitions and distribution at Embankment Films, and later as acquisitions partner at Architect.

== Early life and education ==
Pirkis was born in London on 6 January 1989. His mother is a publisher, and he has a sister. After being educated at Eton College, Pirkis began attending St Catharine's College, Cambridge, where he read Theology and was captain of the college's football team, in 2009.

== Career ==
=== Actor ===
==== Master and Commander ====
Pirkis started his acting in school plays while attending Eton, though he never took them seriously. Although unsure what he wanted to do with his life, Pirkis was cast for his first professional role in 2002, when he appeared in the successful film, Master and Commander: The Far Side of the World. The hire occurred after production staff visited Eton to hire boys for the ship's teenage crew. Pirkis attended a workshop and auditions as "a joke", ultimately securing the part of the 13-year-old, eventually one-armed midshipman Lord Blakeney of HMS Surprise. Director Peter Weir thought Pirkis "stood out very early on, but not to the extent that you see in the film. That was a complete surprise." According to Pirkis, he was at first "nervous" about acting with Russell Crowe, but changed his mind when he realised that Crowe was "a pretty normal guy."

"Pirkis shows maturity beyond his years and makes you believe that he could lead sailors into battle despite his young age. He seems like what you'd expect Aubrey to be like as a boy."

— Scott Chitwood on Pirkis' performance in Master and Commander.

One of four teenage actors chosen for the film, Pirkis began researching the history of the Royal Navy and the Napoleonic Wars to prepare himself for the role, before ultimately spending six months shooting the film. Weir soon discovered that Pirkis had "an old actor's soul in his body," and consequently gave him more acting challenges. Because his character loses an arm, Pirkis wore a prosthetic stump on set; tucking his real arm to the side, he practised how to write and eat using only his left arm. Pirkis completed the amputation scene in two takes, thinking of the death of a family friend for inspiration.

Soon after being cast in Master and Commander, Pirkis was contracted to be represented by Hollywood talent agency ICM. The income he earned for the film was placed into a bank, making him wait until he turned eighteen. For his role, Pirkis received critical acclaim and won the Evening Standard British Film Award for Most Promising Newcomer and the Young Artist Award for Best International Performance by a Young Actor at the 25th Young Artist Awards. Pirkis was also nominated for Best Performance by a Youth in a Lead or Supporting Role – Male at the 4th Phoenix Film Critics Society Awards. Jeremiah Kipp of Slant Magazine praised Pirkis, writing that he "makes a winning impression as midshipman Lord Blakeney, a pugnacious one-armed lad who imitates the masculine bravado of Crowe and the bookish reserve of Bettany."

==== Rome ====
In 2005, Pirkis made his television debut. Until 2007, Pirkis played Gaius Octavian (later to become Caesar Augustus) in the BBC/HBO television series Rome. Many critics highlighted Pirkis and his character for praise. At the beginning of the first season, The Washington Post columnist Tom Shales remarked: "Played both knowingly and innocently by Max Pirkis, he gives the audience something it desperately needs... a character to root for, or at least care about." During the second series, Pirkis was replaced by Simon Woods in order for the show to depict an older version of the character.

=== Post-acting ===
==== Embankment Films ====
Pirkis joined Embankment Films in 2013. In February 2016, Pirkis was appointed head of acquisitions and distribution.

==== Architect ====
In 2023, Pirkis co-founded Architect, a film sales and financing company. As of September 2026, Pirkis was partner of acquisitions.

== Filmography ==
Year(s)	Film	Role
2003	Master and Commander: The Far Side of the World	Lord Blakeney, Midshipman
2005–2007	Rome	Gaius Octavian
2014	The Quiet Ones	David Q
2014	Flying Home	Jason

== See also ==
- List of Old Etonians born in the 20th century
- List of accolades received by Master and Commander: The Far Side of the World
