= Geoff Malone =

Australian architect (1943–2022)

Geoffrey T. Malone (1943 – 17 February 2022) was an Australian architect who was based in Singapore and the founder of the Singapore International Film Festival.

== Early life ==
Malone was born in Australia in 1943.

== Career ==
Prior to moving to Singapore, he acted in the Peter Weir films Homesdale and The Cars That Ate Paris.

Malone designed Crystal Court on River Valley Road, which was completed in 1983, as well as the Palisades condominium, which was completed in 1985. He designed several cinemas, including Yishun 10, the renovated Savoy Cinema and the renovated Republic Theatre.

After visiting the 1986 Mill Valley Film Festival, he had the idea of establishing a film festival in Singapore. He and Mill Valley Film Festival board member L. Leland Whitney founded the Singapore International Film Festival in 1987. He was also a committee member of the Singapore Film Society.

== Personal life and death ==
Malone was married and had a son and a daughter.

He died on 17 February 2022 after a long illness.
