= List of accolades received by Master and Commander: The Far Side of the World =

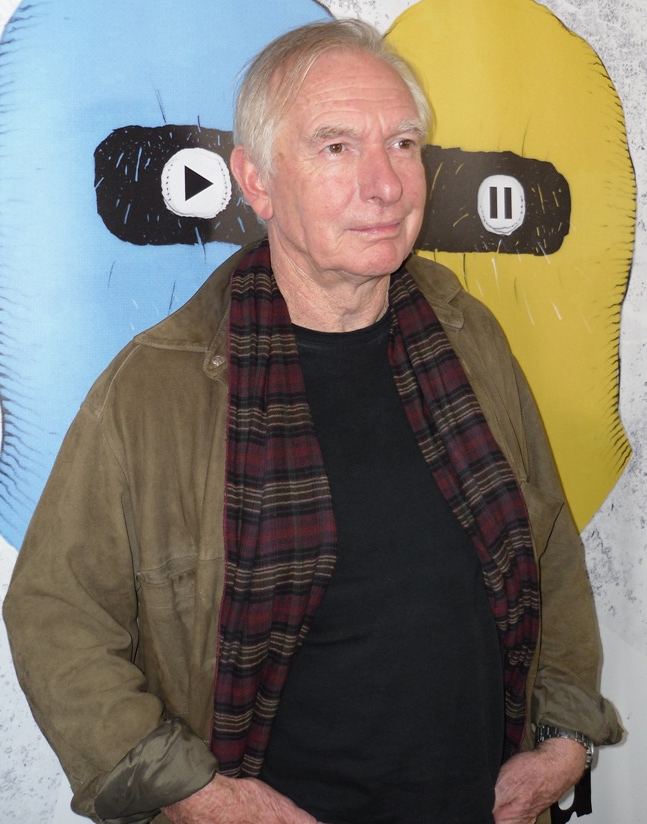
- Peter Weir received over ten nominations for his direction of Master and Commander.
Awards & nominations
| Award | Won | Nominated |
| Academy Award | 2 | 10 |
| American Film Institute Award | 1 | 1 |
| American Society of Cinematographers | 0 | 1 |
| ASCAP Film and Television Music Award | 1 | 1 |
| British Academy Film Award | 4 | 8 |
| Broadcast Film Critics Association Award | 0 | 3 |
| Camerimage | 1 | 2 |
| Chicago Film Critics Association Award | 0 | 2 |
| Cinema Audio Society Award | 1 | 1 |
| David di Donatello Award | 0 | 1 |
| Directors Guild of America Award | 0 | 1 |
| Eddie Award | 0 | 1 |
| Empire Award | 0 | 2 |
| Evening Standard British Film Award | 2 | 2 |
| Film Critics Circle of Australia Award | 0 | 1 |
| Golden Globe Award | 0 | 3 |
| Hollywood Makeup Artist and Hair Stylist Guild Award | 0 | 1 |
| Critics' Circle Film Award | 3 | 6 |
| Golden Reel Awards | 0 | 2 |
| National Board of Review Awards | 1 | 1 |
| National Society of Film Critics Award | 1 | 1 |
| Online Film Critics Society Award | 0 | 3 |
| PGA Award | 0 | 1 |
| Satellite Award | 2 | 7 |
| Screen Music Awards | 1 | 2 |
| USC Scripter Award | 0 | 1 |
| Visual Effects Society Award | 1 | 2 |
| Washington DC Area Film Critics Association Award | 0 | 4 |
| World Soundtrack Award | 0 | 1 |
| Young Artist Award | 1 | 2 |
- Total number of wins and nominations
| Totals | 22 | 74 |
- References

Master and Commander: The Far Side of the World is a 2003 adventure film directed by Peter Weir. He and screenwriter John Collee based the film on several novels in the Aubrey–Maturin series written by Patrick O'Brian. Russell Crowe and Paul Bettany starred in the film, alongside a large ensemble cast. A Samuel Goldwyn Films production, Master and Commander had three American distributors, 20th Century Fox, Miramax Films, and Universal Studios. Fox released the adaptation in North America, while Miramax and Universal served as its distributors overseas. It was released in US theaters on 14 November 2003, where it earned $25.7 million on its opening weekend, debuting in second place behind Elf. Since then, Master and Commander reached a US box office total of more than $93.9 million and after its release in foreign countries over the following few months, its worldwide gross ended at around $212 million. The movie was well received by film critics, with an approval rating of 85 percent on review aggregator website Rotten Tomatoes.

Master and Commander garnered various awards and nominations following its release, ranging from recognition of the film itself to its direction, screenwriting, cinematography, and other technical categories. Performances by the cast were also honored, mainly Crowe for Best Actor, Bettany for Best Supporting Actor, and Max Pirkis for Best Young Actor. The adaptation received ten Academy Award nominations but only won in two categories for Best Cinematography and Best Sound Editing; in a ceremony otherwise dominated by The Lord of the Rings: The Return of the King (which won every award it received a nomination for), these were the only two of the ten Master and Commander categories where Return of the King failed to earn a nomination. At the 57th British Academy Film Awards, Master and Commander received eight nominations, ultimately winning in four of them, including the David Lean Award for Achievement in Directing. Weir's direction received a total of eleven nominations, while he and Collee's screenwriting earned four. The overall film received twelve nominations, coming away with accolades at the American Film Institute Awards, London Film Critics Circle Awards, and National Board of Review Awards. The Golden Globes Awards and Broadcast Film Critics Association Awards each saw the movie earn three nominations but leave empty-handed.

Russell Boyd's cinematography was recognized at eight different award ceremonies; in his first Academy Award nomination, he won the Award for Best Cinematography. Iva Davies, Christopher Gordon, and Richard Tognetti's film score won two out of its four nominations. In addition, Master and Commander was included in a number of lists detailing the best films of the year, including The Wall Street Journal, Slate, and Time Magazine, among others. Writing staff at The Daily Telegraph, The Sunday Times and other media called the film one of the decade's best. Overall, the film won twenty-two awards out of eighty nominations.

== Awards and nominations ==
| Award | Date of ceremony | Category | Recipients and nominees | Result |
|---|---|---|---|---|
| Academy Awards | 29 February 2004 | Best Picture | Samuel Goldwyn, Jr., Peter Weir and Duncan Henderson | Nominated |
| Academy Awards | 29 February 2004 | Best Director | Peter Weir | Nominated |
| Academy Awards | 29 February 2004 | Best Art Direction | Art Direction: William Sandell; Set Decoration: Robert Gould | Nominated |
| Academy Awards | 29 February 2004 | Best Cinematography | Russell Boyd | Won |
| Academy Awards | 29 February 2004 | Best Costume Design | Wendy Stites | Nominated |
| Academy Awards | 29 February 2004 | Best Film Editing | Lee Smith | Nominated |
| Academy Awards | 29 February 2004 | Best Makeup | Edouard Henriques III and Yolanda Toussieng | Nominated |
| Academy Awards | 29 February 2004 | Best Sound Editing | Richard King | Won |
| Academy Awards | 29 February 2004 | Best Sound Mixing | Paul Massey, Doug Hemphill and Art Rochester | Nominated |
| Academy Awards | 29 February 2004 | Best Visual Effects | Dan Sudick, Stefen Fangmeier, Nathan McGuinness and Robert Stromberg | Nominated |
| American Film Institute Awards | December 2003 | Ten Best Pictures Of The Year | Master and Commander: The Far Side of the World | Won |
| American Society of Cinematographers | 8 February 2004 | Outstanding Achievement in Cinematography in Theatrical Releases | Russell Boyd | Nominated |
| ASCAP Film and Television Music Awards | 21 April 2004 | Top Box Office Films | Iva Davies, Christopher Gordon, Richard Tognetti | Won |
| British Academy Film Awards | 15 February 2004 | Best Film | Samuel Goldwyn Jr., Peter Weir, Duncan Henderson | Nominated |
| British Academy Film Awards | 15 February 2004 | David Lean Award for Achievement in Directing | Peter Weir | Won |
| British Academy Film Awards | 15 February 2004 | Best Actor in a Supporting Role | Paul Bettany | Nominated |
| British Academy Film Awards | 15 February 2004 | Best Cinematography | Russell Boyd | Nominated |
| British Academy Film Awards | 15 February 2004 | Best Costume Design | Wendy Stites | Won |
| British Academy Film Awards | 15 February 2004 | Best Production Design | William Sandell | Won |
| British Academy Film Awards | 15 February 2004 | Best Sound | Richard King, Doug Hemphill, Paul Massey, Art Rochester | Won |
| British Academy Film Awards | 15 February 2004 | Best Special Visual Effects | Stefen Fangmeier, Nathan McGuinness, Robert Stromberg, Daniel Sudick | Nominated |
| Broadcast Film Critics Association Awards | 10 January 2004 | Best Film | William Sandell | Nominated |
| Broadcast Film Critics Association Awards | 10 January 2004 | Best Actor | Russell Crowe | Nominated |
| Broadcast Film Critics Association Awards | 10 January 2004 | Best Supporting Actor | Paul Bettany | Nominated |
| Chicago Film Critics Association Awards | 21 January 2004 | Best Director | Peter Weir | Nominated |
| Chicago Film Critics Association Awards | 21 January 2004 | Best Cinematography | Russell Boyd | Nominated |
| Cinema Audio Society Awards | 21 February 2004 | Outstanding Achievement in Sound Mixing for Motion Pictures | Paul Massey, Doug Hemphill, Art Rochester | Won |
| David di Donatello Awards | 14 April 2004 | Best Foreign Film | Peter Weir | Nominated |
| Directors Guild of America Awards | 7 February 2004 | Outstanding Directing – Feature Film | Peter Weir | Nominated |
| Eddie Awards | 15 February 2004 | Best Edited Feature Film – Dramatic | Lee Smith | Nominated |
| Empire Awards | 4 February 2004 | Best Director | Peter Weir | Nominated |
| Empire Awards | 4 February 2004 | Sony Ericsson Scene of the Year | Opening battle | Nominated |
| Evening Standard British Film Awards | 1 February 2004 | Best Actor | Paul Bettany | Won |
| Evening Standard British Film Awards | 1 February 2004 | Most Promising Newcomer | Max Pirkis | Won |
| Film Critics Circle of Australia Awards | 7 November 2004 | Best Foreign Film – English Language | Master and Commander: The Far Side of the World | Nominated |
| Golden Globe Awards | 25 January 2004 | Best Motion Picture – Drama | Master and Commander: The Far Side of the World | Nominated |
| Golden Globe Awards | 25 January 2004 | Best Director | Peter Weir | Nominated |
| Golden Globe Awards | 25 January 2004 | Best Actor – Motion Picture Drama | Russell Crowe | Nominated |
| Golden Reel Awards | 28 February 2004 | Best Sound Editing in Domestic Features – Dialogue & ADR | Richard King, R.J. Kizer, Hugo Weng, Michael Magill, Laura Graham, Donald Sylvester, John A. Larsen, Susan Dawes | Nominated |
| Golden Reel Awards | 28 February 2004 | Best Sound Editing in Domestic Features – Sound Effects & Foley | Richard King, Christopher Flick, Michael W. Mitchell, Hamilton Sterling | Won |
| International Film Festival of the Art of Cinematography | 6 December 2003 | Golden Frog | Russell Boyd | Nominated |
| International Film Festival of the Art of Cinematography | 6 December 2003 | Special Award for Duo Cinematographer – Director | Russell Boyd, Peter Weir | Won |
| Hollywood Makeup Artist and Hair Stylist Guild Awards | 17 January 2004 | Best Period Hair Styling – Feature | Yolanda Toussieng, Kim Santantonio, Barbara Lorenz | Nominated |
| London Critics' Circle Film Awards | 12 February 2004 | Film of the Year | Master and Commander: The Far Side of the World | Won |
| London Critics' Circle Film Awards | 12 February 2004 | Director of the Year | Peter Weir | Nominated |
| London Critics' Circle Film Awards | 12 February 2004 | Actor of the Year | Russell Crowe | Nominated |
| London Critics' Circle Film Awards | 12 February 2004 | Screenwriter of the Year | Peter Weir, John Collee | Won |
| London Critics' Circle Film Awards | 12 February 2004 | British Actor of the Year | Paul Bettany | Won |
| London Critics' Circle Film Awards | 12 February 2004 | British Supporting Actor of the Year | David Threlfall | Nominated |
| National Board of Review Awards | 3 December 2003 | Top Ten Films | Master and Commander: The Far Side of the World | Won |
| National Society of Film Critics Awards | 3 January 2003 | Best Cinematography | Russell Boyd | Won |
| Online Film Critics Society Awards | 5 January 2004 | Best Art Direction | Master and Commander: The Far Side of the World | Nominated |
| Online Film Critics Society Awards | 5 January 2004 | Best Sound | Master and Commander: The Far Side of the World | Nominated |
| Online Film Critics Society Awards | 5 January 2004 | Best Visual Effects | Master and Commander: The Far Side of the World | Nominated |
| PGA Awards | 17 January 2004 | Motion Picture Producer of the Year Award | Samuel Goldwyn Jr., Duncan Henderson, Peter Weir | Nominated |
| Satellite Awards | 23 January 2004 | Best Film – Drama | Master and Commander: The Far Side of the World | Nominated |
| Satellite Awards | 23 January 2004 | Best Art Direction and Production Design | William Sandell, Robert Gould | Nominated |
| Satellite Awards | 23 January 2004 | Best Cinematography | Russell Boyd, Sandi Sissel | Nominated |
| Satellite Awards | 23 January 2004 | Best Costume Design | Wendy Stites | Nominated |
| Satellite Awards | 23 January 2004 | Best Editing | Lee Smith | Nominated |
| Satellite Awards | 23 January 2004 | Best Sound | Richard King, Paul Massey, Doug Hemphill, Art Rochester | Won |
| Satellite Awards | 23 January 2004 | Best Visual Effects | Stefen Fangmeier, Nathan McGuinness, Robert Stromberg, Daniel Sudick | Won |
| Screen Music Awards | 24 May 2004 | Best Feature Film Score | Iva Davies, Christopher Gordon, Richard Tognetti | Nominated |
| Screen Music Awards | 24 May 2004 | Best Soundtrack Album | Iva Davies, Christopher Gordon, Richard Tognetti | Won |
| USC Scripter Awards | 15 February 2004 | USC Scripter Award | Peter Weir, John Collee, Patrick O'Brian | Nominated |
| Visual Effects Society Awards | 18 February 2004 | Outstanding Compositing in a Motion Picture | Philip R. Brennan – "Storm" | Won |
| Visual Effects Society Awards | 18 February 2004 | Outstanding Supporting Visual Effects in a Motion Picture | Stefen Fangmeier, Nathan McGuinness, Robert Stromberg, Brooke Breton | Nominated |
| Washington DC Area Film Critics Association Awards | 19 December 2003 | Best Film | Master and Commander: The Far Side of the World | Nominated |
| Washington DC Area Film Critics Association Awards | 19 December 2003 | Best Director | Peter Weir | Nominated |
| Washington DC Area Film Critics Association Awards | 19 December 2003 | Best Adapted Screenplay | Peter Weir, John Collee | Nominated |
| Washington DC Area Film Critics Association Awards | 19 December 2003 | Best Ensemble | Master and Commander: The Far Side of the World | Nominated |
| World Soundtrack Awards | 9 October 2004 | Discovery of the Year | Iva Davies, Christopher Gordon, Richard Tognetti | Nominated |
| Young Artist Awards | 8 May 2004 | Best Family Feature Film – Drama | Master and Commander: The Far Side of the World | Nominated |
| Young Artist Awards | 8 May 2004 | Best Young Actor in an International Film | Max Pirkis | Won |

== See also ==
- 2003 in film
