= Green Card (film) =

1990 film by Peter Weir

- Theatrical release poster
- Directed by: Peter Weir
- Written by: Peter Weir
- Produced by: Peter Weir
- Starring: Gérard Depardieu; Andie MacDowell
- Cinematography: Geoffrey Simpson
- Edited by: William M. Anderson
- Music by: Hans Zimmer
- Production companies: Australian Film Finance Corporation; Lam Ping
- Distributed by: Buena Vista Pictures Distribution (United States) (Note: Distributed under the Touchstone Pictures banner.); Roadshow Entertainment (Australia and New Zealand); UGC Distribution (France)
- Release dates: 23 December 1990 (New York and Los Angeles); 31 January 1991 (Australia); 1 February 1991 (United States); 20 February 1991 (France)
- Running time: 107 minutes
- Countries: United States; Australia; France
- Language: English
- Budget: $12.5 million
- Box office: $38 million (US/Australia)

Green Card is a 1990 American romantic comedy film written, produced, and directed by Peter Weir and starring Gérard Depardieu and Andie MacDowell.

The screenplay focuses on an American woman who enters into a marriage of convenience with a Frenchman so he can obtain permanent residence (green card) and remain in the United States.

Depardieu won the Golden Globe Award for Best Actor. The film won the Golden Globe for Best Motion Picture – Musical or Comedy, and was nominated for an Oscar for Best Original Screenplay.

== Plot ==
Brontë Parrish, a horticulturalist and an environmentalist, enters into a Green Card marriage with Georges Fauré, an undocumented immigrant from France, so he may stay in the United States. In turn, Brontë uses her fake marriage credentials to rent the apartment of her dreams. After moving in, and in order to explain her spouse's absence, she tells the doorman and neighbors he is conducting musical research in Africa.

Contacted by the Immigration and Naturalization Service for an interview to determine if her marriage is legitimate, Brontë tracks down Georges, who is working as a waiter. Although the two have little time to get their facts straight, the agents who question them appear to be satisfied with their answers. But when one of the agents asks to use the bathroom and Georges directs him to a closet, their suspicions are aroused, and they schedule a full, formal interview to be conducted two days later at their office.

Advised by her attorney that she could face criminal charges if their deception is uncovered, Brontë reluctantly invites Georges to move in with her. They try to learn about each other's past and their quirks and habits but quickly find they can barely tolerate each other. Georges is a fiery-tempered selfish slob and smoker who prefers red meat to vegetarian food, while Brontë is shown as uptight and cold, obsessed with her plants and wrapped up in environmental issues.

Meanwhile, the parents of Lauren Adler, Brontë's best friend, plan to leave New York City and consider donating their trees and plants to the Green Guerrillas, a group overseeing the development of inner-city gardens. Brontë is invited to a dinner party to discuss the issue and discovers Georges is there, having been asked by Lauren. He so impresses the Adlers with an impressionistic piano piece, set to a poem about children and trees, that they agree to donate their plants to the Green Guerrillas. When Brontë's parents later arrive at the apartment for an unannounced visit, Georges pretends to be the handyman.

When Brontë's boyfriend Phil returns from a trip, Georges reveals that he is married to her. Brontë angrily kicks Georges out, but the pair nonetheless appear at the immigration interview the next day. The two are questioned separately, and when Georges is caught out by the interviewer, he confesses the marriage is a sham. He agrees to deportation but insists Brontë not be charged for her role in the charade. He lets Brontë believe the interview was a success and the two go their separate ways.

A few days later, Georges invites Brontë to join him at the cafe where they first met. When she notices one of the immigration agents is waiting outside, she realizes Georges is being deported and tries to stop him from being sent away as they've both realized they are in love with each other.

Georges promises to write every day asking the same question "When are you coming, chérie?", a line he had also used when describing their fabricated courtship to the INS. Just before he leaves with the immigration agent, Brontë asks if he still has their wedding rings; he pulls them out of his pocket and they quickly exchange rings again, laughing and kissing. Then Georges departs with the agent as Brontë watches from the sidewalk.

== Cast ==
- Gérard Depardieu as Georges Fauré
- Andie MacDowell as Brontë Parrish
- Bebe Neuwirth as Lauren Adler
- Gregg Edelman as Phil
- Robert Prosky as Brontë's Lawyer
- Mary Louise Wilson as Mrs. Sheehan
- Lois Smith as Brontë's Mother
- John Spencer as Harry
- Ann Dowd as Peggy
- Larry Wright as Larry Wright, The Bucket Drummer
- Ethan Phillips as INS Agent Gorsky

== Production ==
Peter Weir wrote the script, an original, specifically as a vehicle for Gérard Depardieu to introduce him to a wide English-speaking audience. The film had a similar theme and plot to The Paper Wedding (French: Les noces de papier), a 1989 made for television Canadian film directed by Michel Brault, which was subsequently entered into the 40th Berlin International Film Festival.

Partial funding for the film was provided by the Film Finance Corporation Australia and Union Générale Cinématographique. Although the film was set in America and did not feature Australian actors, the fact it was written, directed, filmed, designed and edited by an Australian enabled it to receive funding from the Australian government. This was $3.8 million from the FFC.

== Music ==
=== Original soundtrack ===
Green Card: Original Motion Picture Soundtrack

Soundtrack album by Hans Zimmer
- Released: 22 January 1991
- Recorded: 1990 at Rhino Studios, Sydney, Australia
- Genres: Film score, instrumental pop, new-age, soft rock, world, classical
- Length: 44:56
- Label: Varèse Sarabande
- Producers: Hans Zimmer, Peter Weir

Green Card: Original Motion Picture Soundtrack was released on 22 January 1991 on Varèse Sarabande.

Some of the music like "River", "Watermark", and "Storms in Africa" by Enya, "Holdin' On" by Soul II Soul, "Oyin Momo Ado" by Babatunde Olatunji and "Surfin' Safari" by The Beach Boys are heard in the movie, but not included in the soundtrack.

==== Track listing ====
1. "Street Drums" (Larry Wright) (1:29)
2. "Instinct" (3:33)
3. "Restless Elephant" (2:55)
4. "Cafe Afrika" (2:59)
5. "Greenhouse" (3:15)
6. "Moonlight" (1:24)
7. "9AM Central Park" (1:48)
8. "Clarinet Concerto in a Major: Adagio" (W.A. Mozart) (8:38)
9. "Silence" (4:38)
10. "Instinct II" (3:09)
11. "Asking You" (1:45)
12. "Pour Bronté" (6:19)
13. "Eyes on the Prize" (The Emmaus Group Singers) (3:04)

== Reception ==
=== Critical response ===
On Rotten Tomatoes the film holds a 59% approval rating based on 32 reviews, with an average rating of 5.5/10. On Metacritic, the film has a weighted average score of 58 out of 100, based on 17 critics, indicating "mixed or average" reviews. Audiences polled by CinemaScore gave the film an average grade of "A" on an A+ to F scale.

Janet Maslin of The New York Times called it "as breezily escapist as a film this facile can be" and added, "Ms. MacDowell ... has a lovely, demure ease that makes George's appreciative gaze quite understandable. Mr. Depardieu, in the role that gets him into a New York Yankees cap, proves that he is nothing if not a sport ... He comes to life most fully when he lapses into French or is otherwise momentarily freed from the story's constraints." Roger Ebert of the Chicago Sun-Times observed the film "is not blindingly brilliant, and is not an example of the very best work of the director who made The Year of Living Dangerously or the actor who starred in Cyrano de Bergerac. But it is a sound, entertaining work of craftsmanship, a love story between two people whose meet is not as cute as it might have been."

Peter Travers of Rolling Stone called the film a "captivating romantic bonbon" and added, "Don't look for the originality and grit that distinguished Weir's Australian films Picnic at Hanging Rock and Gallipoli, Green Card has all the heft of a potato chip. But Depardieu's charm recognizes no language barriers, and MacDowell, the revelation of Sex, Lies, and Videotape, proves a fine, sexy foil." Rita Kempley of The Washington Post said, "Like Ghost and Pretty Woman, this romance is blissfully dependent on our staying good and starry-eyed, seduced by the charisma of the leads. And we do, despite its lackadaisical pace and disappointing ending."

Variety said, "Although a thin premise endangers its credibility at times, Green Card is a genial, nicely played romance." Time Out London stated "Weir's first romantic comedy boasts a central relationship which is tentative and hopeful, a mood beautifully realised by Depardieu (venturing into new territory with a major English-speaking role). Complemented by the refined MacDowell, his gracious, generous performance is never dominating, and their exchanges offer unexpected pleasures. In terms of the genre's conventions, Weir likens this film to 'a light meal.' It's one to savour." Channel 4 said, "Weir's film has its fair share of cute moments as the opposites slowly begin to attract, but this is largely over rated stuff, which proved curiously popular with critics on its release. Depardieu does his obnoxious-yet-strangely-lovable act with ease; however, the romantic comedy fixture MacDowell is less convincing."

=== Box office ===
Green Card grossed $29.9 million in the United States and Canada. In Australia, it was the highest-grossing local film with a gross of A$10,585,060 (US$8 million).

=== Accolades ===
Award	Category	Nominee(s)	Result
Academy Awards	Best Screenplay – Written Directly for the Screen	Peter Weir	Nominated
British Academy Film Awards	Best Original Screenplay	Peter Weir	Nominated
Golden Globe Awards	Best Motion Picture – Musical or Comedy		Won
Golden Globe Awards	Best Actor in a Motion Picture – Musical or Comedy	Gérard Depardieu	Won
Golden Globe Awards	Best Actress in a Motion Picture – Musical or Comedy	Andie MacDowell	Nominated
London Film Critics' Circle Awards	Actor of the Year	Gérard Depardieu	Won
Writers Guild of America Awards	Best Screenplay – Written Directly for the Screen	Peter Weir	Nominated

== Home media release ==
Touchstone released the film on VHS on 12 June 1991 and Touchstone Home Entertainment released the film on Region 1 DVD on 4 March 2003. It is in anamorphic widescreen format with audio tracks in English and French.

Green Card was released on DVD by Umbrella Entertainment in February 2004. The DVD is compatible with all region codes and includes special features such as the original theatrical trailer, Umbrella Entertainment trailers, and interviews with Peter Weir, Gérard Depardieu and Andie MacDowell.

== See also ==
- Cinema of Australia
- Hold Back the Dawn (earlier film with a similar theme)
