= Larry Wright (street drummer) =

American drummer

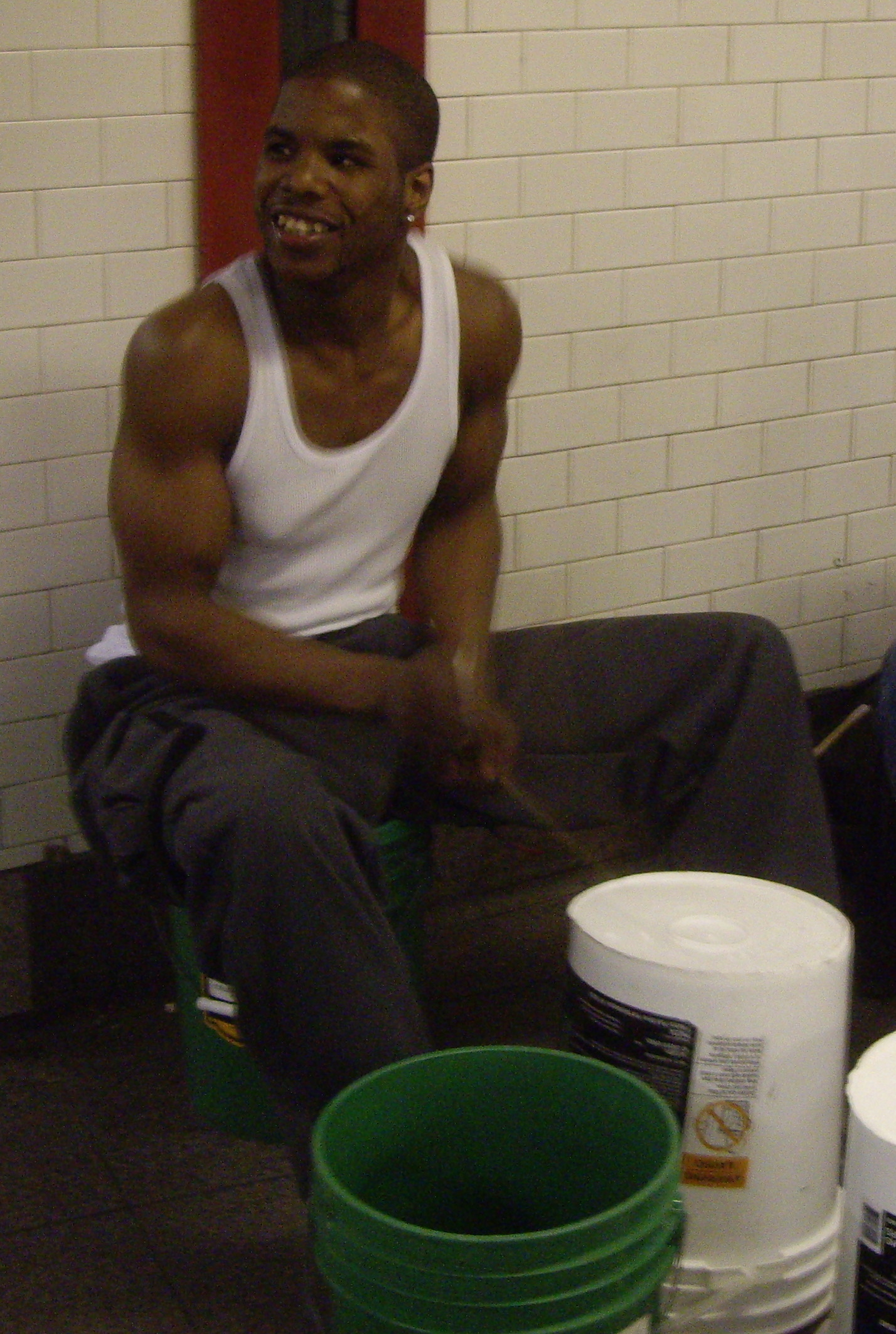

Background information
- Born: c. 1975
- Origin: Bronx, New York, United States
- Instrument: Drums

Larry Wright (born c. 1975) is a well-known New York City street performer. He is credited as the first major drummer to use five gallon plastic buckets instead of a normal drum kit. He uses his foot to lift the bucket changing the sound patterns.

He has appeared in commercials, Mariah Carey's "Someday" video, Bring in 'da Noise, Bring in 'da Funk as well as the movie Green Card. In 2011 he appeared in the film The Yellow Card directed by Enrique Pedráza Botero. It is a short documentary based on subway performers in New York City, where Larry Wright and his wife Sonia Wright are one of the main acts in the film as they play their music and are being interviewed. He is listed among the musicians performing on Ritual Beating System by Bahia Black, a 1992 CD produced by Bill Laswell. The CD features a track, "Uma Viagen Del Baldes de Larry Wright" (translation: A journey of the buckets of Larry Wright), which he co-wrote with Carlinhos Brown. There is an independent movie about him as a high school student.

He has played since he was five years old, and met his wife while playing in the New York City Subway.

In 1990, at age fifteen, Wright performed a New Year’s Eve concert with John Lurie in Germany.

His favorite drummers are Eyeon, Tito Puente, Max Roach, and Buddy Rich. He and his wife can typically be found at the Union Square, Penn Station, Port Authority, and 59th and Lexington subway stations.

A more recent interview with Larry and his wife Sonia appears in Issue Four of The Drummer's Journal.
