= GV Yishun =

Multiplex cinema in Yishun, Singapore

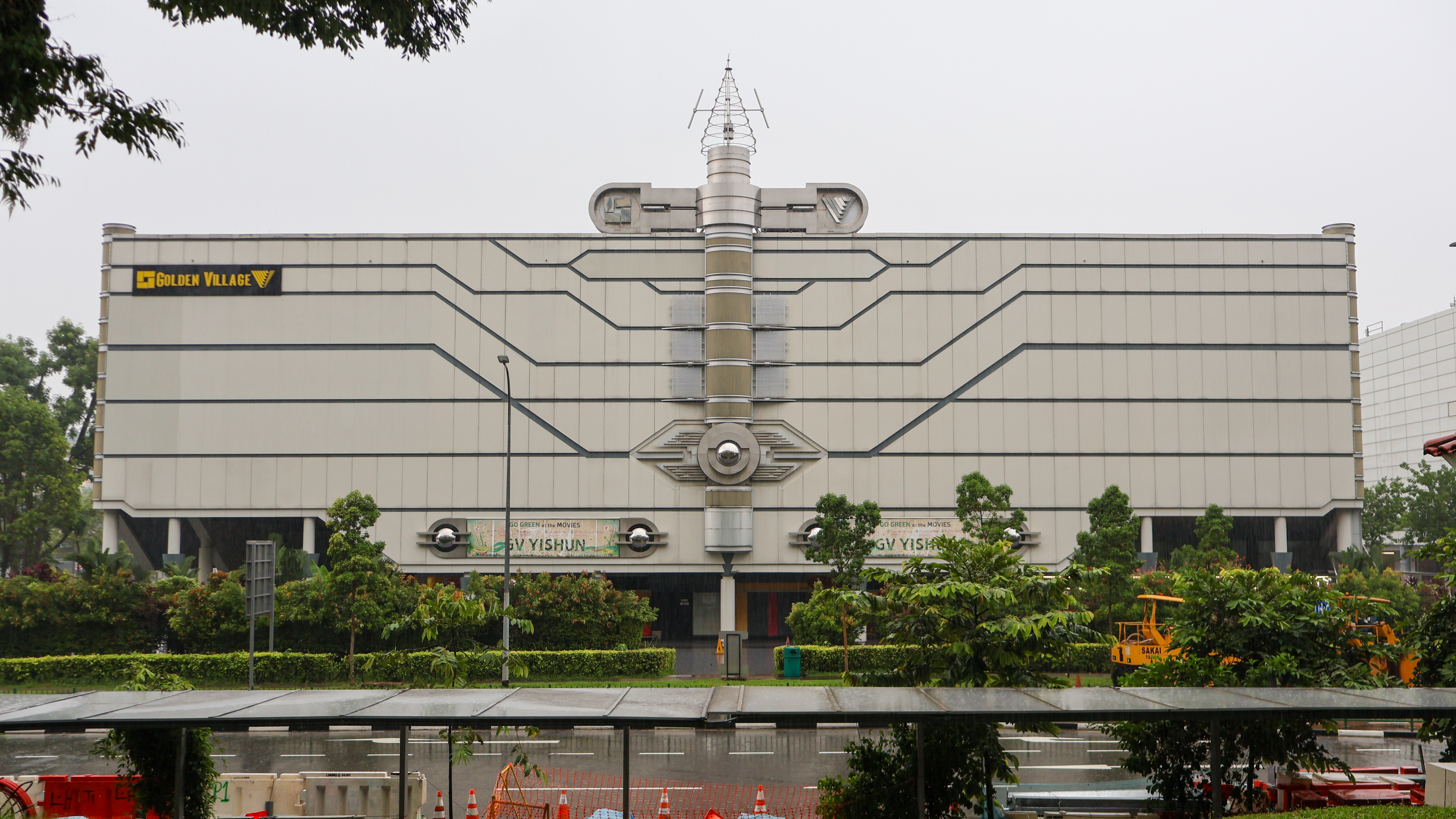
- Exterior of GV Yishun in 2025

- Location within Singapore
- Former names: Yishun 10
- Address: 51 Yishun Central 1, Singapore 768794
- Location: Yishun, Singapore
- Coordinates: 1°25′47.6″N 103°50′11.1″E
- Owner: Golden Village
- Operator: Golden Village
- Capacity: 2552
- Type: multiplex
- Public transit: NS13 Yishun

Construction
- Built: December 1990; 35 years ago
- Opened: 28 May 1992; 34 years ago
- Renovated: August 2010 – November 2010
- Cost: S$37 million
- Architect: Geoff Malone
- Builder: Sembawang Construction

Website
- www.gv.com.sg

Golden Village Yishun (GV Yishun), formerly Yishun 10, is a multiplex cinema located in Yishun, Singapore. Operated by Golden Village, it was the first multiplex in Singapore. GV Yishun features postmodern architecture with stripes.

Prior to the cinema's existence, Yishun in the 1980s did not have a proper town centre for activities such as going to the cinemas. Several plots of land in Yishun were put up for sale for the private sector in September 1990 by the government, which included a plot for a cinema. Golden Harvest, along with the Village Roadshow Corporation, announced in November intentions to build a multiplex in Singapore. Golden Harvest and Village Roadshow won the bid, with Golden Village established by the two companies to operate the multiple. Works already began by December, with Yishun 10 starting operations on 28 May 1992. In August 2010, the cinema underwent a three-month renovation. The renovations were completed in November and the multiplex was renamed to Golden Village Yishun.

GV Yishun has 10 cinemas, all of which have different capacities. Yishun 10 also introduced several new features for cinemas when it first opened: a computerised ticketing system and facilities for the handicapped. The multiplex's exterior was noted for being lit with bright neon colours when it opened, though was switched to a muted grey colour scheme following the renovation.

== History ==
During the 1980s, the Yishun new town did not have a proper town centre for amenities such as borrowing books or going to the cinemas, resulting in many residents having to go nearby Ang Mo Kio for such amenities. The Housing and Development Board (HDB) put up several several plots of land, including a 3,635 square metres (4,347 sq yd) site in Yishun for a cinema complex, on sale in September 1989, the first instance of a HDB land sale to the private sector. In November, Raymond Chow of Golden Harvest announced that he bidded for two plots of land along with the Village Roadshow Corporation in a joint venture called Golden Village. If the bids were successful, then he would establish the first multiplex in Singapore. Chow, along with his partner, claimed that the bid would be successful due to "extensive market research". Several other cinema companies also bidded for the site. When Raymond Chow was later asked by The New Paper on why he chose to bid for the plots of land in a 1991 interview, Chow cited the sites' proximity to public transport facilities and Yishun's growing development.

External media
- Artist's impression of Yishun 10
- Jackie Chan at the construction site of Yishun 10
- Crowd at Yishun' 10's opening

Golden Harvest received approval from the government to construct the proposed multiplex on a 2,926 square metres (3,499 sq yd) site, which along with a similar project in Tampines, would cost S$75.8 million (1990) (US$41.82 million), or HK$320 million. Sembawang Construction was appointed in December to build the multiplex, by which works on the cinema had already begun. The cinema was expected for completion by next December. By September, the cinema, now given the name of Yishun 10, was expected to be completed by next January. In the same month, kongfu actor Jackie Chan visited the Yishun 10's construction site to officiate the last phase of construction. By November 1991, the multiplex was expected to open by early next year. As announced on 23 May 1992, Yishun 10 opened on 28 May 1992.

In June 2010, it was announced by Golden Village that Yishun 10 would undergo renovations from August to November. The renovations were completed and the multiplex was reopened as Golden Village Yishun (GV) in November, which was Golden Village first "green" cinema complex.

Yishun 10 was purchased by Frasers Property in 2025 for S$48 million. As of 2026, Yishun 10 is expected to be redeveloped for mixed residential and commercial use.

== Details ==
GV Yishun is a four-storey multiplex cinema. Located in Yishun, it is operated by Golden Village. The multiplex has 10 cinemas, all of which have different capacities. At the time of its opening, GV Yishun had features that were considered by news outlets to be "new": facilities for the handicapped and a computerised ticketing system. Such features included a motorised pulley system for stairs and dedicated spaces in the cinema for the former. The computerised ticketing system allocated seats to customers based on the "best" seats available, though they were still able to choose their own seat. Yishun 10 also introduced the "Smart card", a value-stored card for watching movies. It is regarded by news outlets as the first multiplex in Singapore. (Note: It was noted by The Straits Times that Singaporeans considered a multiplex to be "a complex with a few small modern cinemas, shops, restaurants and other recreational activities".)

The multiplex was built in the post-modernist architecture style by Geoff Malone, the founder of the Singapore Film Festival. According to Malone, he was instructed to design the building similar to "a rocket ship which had landed in Yishun from outer space", which was effectuated with metal-cladded exterior and red stripes. The entrances to the building were located on diagonally opposite corners. The first and second floors house GV Yishun's atrium – the first floor has restaurants and is adorned with multicoloured, science fiction-styled lights while the second floor has a foyer. The building initially had a colour scheme of red, white, silver, and hints of other primary colours. Architect professor Robert Powell compared GV Yishun's former exterior to the Kirin Building in Osaka, Japan, designed by Shin Takamatsu. Powell noted that unlike the Kirin building's monochromatic exterior, GV Yishun adopted a more colourful exterior to evoke "the excitement and magic of 'a night at the movies'". However, following the 2010 renovation, the exterior was modified to be muted grey. The building was originally planned to have a blue and silver colour scheme, though was changed as blue is a colour associated with funerals in Chinese culture. The building adorned blue, orange, and red neon lights at night.
