= Whatever Happened to Green Valley? =

- Directed by: Peter Weir
- Written by: Peter Weir
- Produced by: Anthony Buckley
- Distributed by: Film Australia
- Release date: 1973
- Country: Australia
- Language: English

Whatever Happened to Green Valley? is a 1973 Australian documentary directed by Peter Weir.
