= Ivar Kants =

Australian actor

- Born: 19 July 1949 (age 77); Adelaide, South Australia, Australia
- Occupation: Actor
- Years active: 1967–present
- Spouse: Jenny Kants (m. 1970)
- Children: 4

Ivar Kants (born 19 July 1949), commonly credited as Ivor Kants or Ivar Kanz, is an Australian actor who has played numerous roles in film, television and theatre.

== Early life ==
Kants was born in Adelaide, South Australia. Both his parents were originally from Latvia, but they immigrated to Australia before he was born. Kants left home at 19 to enrol in National Institute of Dramatic Art (NIDA) in Sydney, and graduated with a degree in performing arts (acting) in 1970.

== Career ==
=== Film and television ===
Kants has appeared in many soap operas and TV drama series, including A Country Practice, G.P., All Saints, Water Rats, and Blue Heelers. He portrayed the role of Ken Garrett in the soap opera The Restless Years (1979) and starred as Father Menotti, a caring inner-city parish priest in the 1980–81 TV series Menotti.

A more prominent role was as school principal Barry Hyde, a regular in Home and Away. He has also appeared in Neighbours, Heartbreak High and in the TV movieThe Plumber.

His ability to tell a story is supported by the many narrations he has recorded for SBS and the ABC. He narrated the Hairy Maclary audiobook series released by ABC for Kids.

=== Theatre ===
In addition to his on-screen work, Kants has also had an active theatre career, with his many roles in Shakespeare plays colouring his vocal work.

== Personal life ==
Kants has been married to Jenny Kants since 1970. They have four children, including his daughter Sarah Kants (born 1974), who is also an actress.

== Filmography ==
=== Films ===
Year	Title	Role	Notes
1976	The Understudy	-	TV movie
1977	Ballantyne's Mission	-	TV movie
1978	Puzzle	Detective Constable Gilbert	TV movie
1979	Dawn!	Len	Movie
1979	The Plumber	Max	TV movie
1979	Barnaby and Me	Boris	TV movie
1982	Brothers	Kevin Wild	Movie
1983	The Dean Case	-	TV movie
1983	Moving Out	Mr Clarke	Movie
1984	The Secret Discovery of Australia	Mendonca	TV movie
1984	Silver City	Julian	Movie
1985	The Naked Country	Sgt Neil Adams	Movie
1985	Jenny Kissed Me	Lindsay Fenton	Movie
1986	The Three Musketeers	D'Artagnan (voice)	TV movie
1986	Twelfth Night	Orsino	Movie
1987	Gallagher's Travels	Gallagher	Movie
1989	The Edge of Power	Peter Mueller	Movie
1989	Cassidy	Seger	TV movie
1993	You and Me and Uncle Bob	Mick	Movie
1993	My Cage	Edmunds Bērzs	Movie
1995	Return to Sandakan	Narrator	Documentary
2002	Counterstrike	Crewman	TV movie
2015	F Meat	Fielding	Short film

=== Television ===
Year	Title	Role	Notes
1973-1976	Certain Women	Michael Fraser	TV series
1975	Shannon's Mob	Tarovic	Episode: Without Incident
1976	Homicide	Luke	Episode: Leader of the Pack
1976	The Outsiders	Franz Benson	Episode: Change of Image
1977	Bluey	Roger Stevens	Episode: Lonely Ordeal
1977	The Restless Years	Ken Garrett	TV series
1978	Glenview High	Roger	2 episodes: Birdcage, The Sect
1979	Chopper Squad	James	Episode: The Big Trip
1979	Doctor Down Under	Dr. Bailey	Episode: The Name of the Game
1980-1981	Menotti	Father Jack Menotti	TV series
1980-1981	Cop Shop	Sgt. Roger Sutherland, Richard Evan Walters	4 episodes
1981	Bellamy	Ogden	Episode: The Bank You Can Trust
1982	Runaway Island	Hendrik	TV series
1982, 1988, 1993	A Country Practice	Tom Hartley, Ron Greenway, Jonathan Fletcher	6 episodes
1983	Carson's Law	Steve Coutts	2 episodes: The Bolshevik, Picking up the Pieces
1984-1985	Special Squad	Scalese	2 episodes: Ghosts, Business as Usual
1986	Prime Time	-	TV series
1987	The Flying Doctors	Tony Symonds	4 episodes
1988	Rafferty's Rules	Father Phelan	Episode: Confessions
1988	The Last Resort	-	TV series
1988-1989	Mission: Impossible	Von Schau, Father Thomas Vallis	2 episodes: The Legacy, Command Performance
1992	Six Pack	Ben	Episode: Loveless
1993	G.P.	Morris Stevens	Episode: Drowning Not Waving
1994	Escape from Jupiter	Karl	TV mini series
1994	Neighbours	Dave Gottlieb	18 episodes
1994-1997	Heartbreak High	Roberto Bordino	TV series
1994, 2002	Blue Heelers	Terry Kennedy, Simon Curtis	3 episodes
1998	Murder Call	Hugo Riccadelli	Season 2, Episode 17: Blowing the Whistle
1999	Water Rats	Geoff Cooper	Episode: Dangerous Encounters
2001	All Saints	Dr. Richard Bird	5 episodes
2001-2002	Beastmaster	Ramah, Slythius	9 episodes
2002	The Lost World	Warbek the Druid	Episode: Warbek the Druid
2002	Farscape	Gaashah	Episode: A Perfect Murder
2004-2006	Home and Away	Barry Hyde	TV series
2018	Harrow	Michael Wagner	Episode: Lex Talionis
2026	Heartbreak High	Principal McMahon	Recurring role

== Stage ==
Year	Title	Role	Notes
1967	The Choephori (The Libation Bearers)	Chorus member	University of NSW
1968	A Midsummer Night's Dream		Theatre 62, Adelaide
1969	The Night of the Iguana	Reverend Shannon	NIDA Theatre
1969	The Glass Menagerie	Tom Wingfield	NIDA Theatre
1970	A Midsummer Night's Dream		University of NSW with Old Tote Theatre
1970	Blood Wedding		University of NSW with Old Tote Theatre
1971	Cloak, Crown and Dagger	Macbeth	Queensland secondary schools tour
1971	Julius Caesar Meet Mr Brutus	Caesar	Queensland secondary schools tour
1971	The Wind in the Sassafras Trees	Wayne Nelson	SGIO Theatre, Brisbane with Queensland Theatre Company
1971	The Legend of King O'Malley		New South Wales, The Playhouse, Canberra, SGIO Theatre, Brisbane with Queensland Theatre Company
1972	Lock Up Your Daughters	Ramble	SGIO Theatre, Brisbane with Queensland Theatre Company
1972	Heidi (a children's musical)		La Boite Theatre
1972	Assault with a Deadly Weapon	Curtis	SGIO Theatre, Brisbane with Queensland Theatre Company
1972	The Schoolmistress	Jack Mallory	Queensland Theatre Company
1972	Twelfth Night	Orsino	SGIO Theatre, Brisbane with Queensland Theatre Company
1972	The Ruling Class	Dinsdale Gurney	SGIO Theatre, Brisbane with Queensland Theatre Company
1972	The Taming of the Shrew	Lucentio	Old Tote Theatre Company
1973	'Tis Pity She's a Whore	Giovanni	Old Tote Theatre Company
1973	Arsenic and Old Lace	Officer Klien	Old Tote Theatre Company
1973	Kabul	Akbar Khan	Old Tote Theatre Company
1973	Lysistrata	Manes	Old Tote Theatre Company
1973	Richard II	Lord Aumerle	Old Tote Theatre Company
1973	The Threepenny Opera	Hook-finger Jake	Sydney Opera House with Old Tote Theatre Company
1974	Ruzzante Returns from the Wars		University of NSW
1974	Love for Love	Buckram	Old Tote Theatre Company
1974	The Cradle of Hercules	Corporal Hurst	Sydney Opera House with Old Tote Theatre Company
1974	La Mandragola	Callimaco	Old Tote Theatre Company
1974	Three Men on a Horse	Jake	Sydney Opera House with Old Tote Theatre Company
1974	The Chapel Perilous	Judith / Sister Rosa / David / Saul	Sydney Opera House with Old Tote Theatre Company
1984	Love's Labour Lost	Ferdinand / King of Navarre	Old Tote Theatre Company
1974-75	Hotel Paradiso		University of NSW, Playhouse, Canberra
1975	Much Ado About Nothing	Don Pedro	Nimrod Theatre Company
1975	Richard III	Edward IV / Richmond	Nimrod Theatre Company
1976	All Good Men		Stables Theatre
1976	Mourning Becomes Electra	Orin	Sydney Opera House
1976	The Recruiting Officer	Mr Worthy	Nimrod Theatre Company
1976	The Duchess of Malfi	Antonio Bolgna	Nimrod Theatre Company
1977	Much Ado About Nothing	Don Pedro	Nimrod Theatre Company, Space Theatre, Adelaide
1978	King Lear	Edmund	SGIO Theatre, Brisbane with Queensland Theatre Company
1977-78	The Club	Geoff Hayward	Nimrod Theatre Company, Canberra Theatre, Theatre Royal, Sydney, Her Majesty's Theatre, Brisbane, Orange Civic Theatre
1978	Widowers' Houses	Dr Harry Trench	University of NSW with Old Tote Theatre Company
1979	Kookaburra	Steve Clare	ABC Radio, Sydney
1979	The Lady of the Camellias	Armand Duval	Sydney Opera House with Old Tote Theatre Company
1979-80	The Club	Geoff Hayward	St George Leagues Club, Dapto Leagues Club & The Old Vic, London with Nimrod Theatre Company
1981	Three Sisters	Vassily Vassilyevich Solyony	Nimrod Theatre Company
1981	The Revenger's Tragedy	Vindice	Playhouse, Adelaide with State Theatre Company of South Australia
1981	Tales from the Vienna Woods	Alfred	Nimrod Theatre Company
1982	The Circle		Theatre Royal, Sydney with Peerwill Productions
1985	Too Young for Ghosts	Edvards / Leichhardt	Sydney Theatre Company
1986	She Stoops to Conquer	Young Marlow	Seymour Centre with Nimrod Theatre Company
1986	Wild Honey	Voinitsov	Seymour Centre with Nimrod Theatre Company
1986	The Merchant of Venice	Bassanio	Seymour Centre with Nimrod Theatre Company
1988	Manning Clark's History of Australia: The Musical	Manning Clark / Rev. Marsden / Judge Barry.	Princess Theatre, Melbourne
1989	Director's Workshop	Macbeth / Malvolio	The Peter Summerton Foundation
1990	Moby Dick	Starbuck	Suncorp Theatre, Brisbane, Marian Street Theatre, Seymour Centre with Queensland Theatre Company
1990	Sydney to Stratford		Globe International
1991	Marina - Journey to the End	Sergei Efron & others	Marina Productions
1992	On Golden Pond	Bill Ray	Marian Street Theatre
1992	Other People's Money	William Coles	Ensemble Theatre
1993	The Little Prince	The Prince	Sunday Pictures
1993	The Seahorse	Harry	Ensemble Theatre
1996	Sail Away Shakespeare		The Solway Lass, Sydney
1996	A Midsummer Night's Dream		University of NSW
1996	Much Ado About Nothing	Don Pedro	Athenaeum Theatre, Sydney Opera House, Canberra Theatre with Bell Shakespeare
1997	The Seagull	Doctor Dorn	Belvoir Theatre Company
1997	The Winter's Tale	Polixenes	Bell Shakespeare
1998	The Herbal Bed	John Hall	Sydney Theatre Company
2000	A Midsummer Night's Dream	Theseus / Oberon	Geelong Performing Arts Centre, His Majesty's Theatre, Perth, Gold Coast Arts Centre, Princess Theatre, Launceston, Theatre Royal, Hobart, Athenaeum Theatre, Playhouse, Canberra, Sydney Opera House
2008	The Good German	Karl Vogel	Seymour Centre

== Accolades ==
Kants was nominated for Best Actor at the 1984 AFI Awards for Silver City.
