= Homesdale =

- Title card
- Directed by: Peter Weir
- Written by: Piers Davies; Peter Weir
- Produced by: Grahame Bond; Richard Brennan
- Starring: Geoff Malone; Kate Fitzpatrick
- Cinematography: Anthony Wallis
- Edited by: Wayne LeClos
- Music by: Rory O'Donoghue; Grahame Bond
- Release date: June 1971
- Running time: 52 minutes
- Country: Australia
- Language: English
- Budget: $3,000

Homesdale is a 1971 Australian film directed by Peter Weir. Homesdale is a black comedy about visitors at a guest house acting out their violent private fantasies and games under the control of the house staff.

== Plot ==
Several people gather at the Homesdale Hunting Lodge, including butcher/rock singer Mr. Kevin, war veteran Mr. Vaughan, and an octogenarian named Mr. Levy. All of them are increasingly tormented by Homesdale's staff, and are forced to participate in a series of death games in which the true character of the guests starts to emerge.

== Cast ==
- Geoff Malone as Mr. Malfry
- Grahame Bond as Mr. Kevin
- Kate Fitzpatrick as Miss Greenoak
- Barry Donnelly as Mr. Vaughan
- Doreen Warburton as Mrs. Sharpe
- James Lear as Mr. Levy
- James Dellit as Manager
- Kosta Akon as Chief Robert
- Richard Brennan as Robert 1
- Peter Weir as Robert 2
- Shirley Donald as Matron
- Phillip Noyce as Neville

== Production ==
The movie was influenced by horror films such as The Cat and the Canary. The budget was covered by a grant from the Experimental Film and Television Fund. The film was shot at Peter Weir's own home in Sydney in March 1971.

== Release ==
The film premiered at the Sydney Film Festival in June 1971 and won the Grand Prix AFI Award in November. It was screened in universities, schools, film societies, and occasionally commercial cinemas, as well as on the Seven Network.
