= Gallipoli (1981 film) =

1981 Australian film by Peter Weir

- Australian theatrical release poster
- Directed by: Peter Weir
- Screenplay by: David Williamson
- Story by: Peter Weir
- Produced by: Robert Stigwood; Patricia Lovell
- Starring: Mel Gibson; Mark Lee
- Cinematography: Russell Boyd
- Edited by: William Anderson
- Production companies: Associated R&R Films
- Distributed by: Roadshow Film Distributors (Australia); Paramount Pictures (International)
- Release dates: 7 August 1981 (Sydney); 13 August 1981 (Australia); 28 August 1981 (USA)
- Running time: 111 minutes
- Country: Australia
- Language: English
- Budget: A$2.8 million
- Box office: A$11.7 million (Australia) $5.7 million (US)

Gallipoli is a 1981 Australian war drama film directed by Peter Weir and produced by Patricia Lovell and Robert Stigwood, starring Mel Gibson and Mark Lee. The film revolves around several young men from Western Australia who enlist in the Australian Army during World War I. They are sent to the Gallipoli peninsula in the Ottoman Empire (modern-day Turkey), where they take part in the Gallipoli campaign. During the course of the film, the young men slowly lose their innocence about the purpose of war. The climax of the film occurs on the Anzac battlefield at Gallipoli, depicting the futile attack at the Battle of the Nek on 7 August 1915.

Gallipoli, which had a budget of $2.6 million, provides a faithful portrayal of life in Australia in the 1910s—reminiscent of Weir's 1975 film Picnic at Hanging Rock set in 1900—and captures the ideals and character of the Australians who joined up to fight, as well as the conditions they endured on the battlefield, although its portrayal of British forces has been criticised as inaccurate. It followed the Australian New Wave war film Breaker Morant (1980) and preceded the 5-part TV series Anzacs (1985), and The Lighthorsemen (1987). Themes of these films include the Australian identity, such as mateship and larrikinism, the loss of innocence in war, and the continued coming of age of the Australian nation and its soldiers (later called the Anzac spirit).

Gallipoli received heavy international promotion and distribution and helped to elevate the worldwide reputation of the Australian film industry and of later Australian New Wave films. The film also helped to launch the international career of actor Mel Gibson. Due to the Gallipoli battlefields becoming tourist destinations in the 21st century, the film is often shown at the hostels and hotels in Eceabat and Çanakkale on the Dardanelles. In the 20 to 1 episode "Great Aussie Films", Gallipoli was listed as Number 1.

== Plot ==
In Western Australia, May 1915, Archy Hamilton, an 18-year-old stockman and prize-winning sprinter, longs to enlist in the Australian Imperial Force (AIF). He is trained by his uncle Jack and idolises Harry Lasalles, the world champion over 100 yards. Archy wins a race with a bullying farmhand, Les McCann, Archy running bare-foot and Les riding his horse bareback.

Frank Dunne is an unemployed ex-railway labourer who has run out of money. He is an accomplished sprinter and hopes to win the prize money at the athletics carnival; he also bets a lot of money on himself winning. Archy and Uncle Jack journey to the athletics carnival. Frank is surprised when Archy defeats him, and is bitter at first and feels robbed of his bet. Eventually, Frank approaches Archy in a cafe after getting over his loss. Archy gives all the prize money he won at the race to Jack and tells him that he will not be coming home for he has decided to enlist. They both decide to travel to Perth and enlist there.

As Archy and Frank are penniless, they secretly hop on a freight train. As they awake the next morning, they discover the train had stopped at a remote desert station instead of Perth. The station attendant informs them that they could either wait a fortnight for the next train, or walk 50 miles across the dry lake bed to reach a location with a more frequent service. Archy immediately sets off while Frank chases behind trying to persuade him to stay, reminding him that they could die in the desert much as members of the Burke & Wills expedition did. With Archy's navigation skills, the pair eventually reach a cattle station in safety. Upon arriving in Perth, they arrange to stay with Frank's father, an Irish migrant. Due to Frank's Irish heritage and general cynicism, he has little desire to fight for the British Empire. Archy persuades him to try to enlist in the Australian Light Horse. Failing to ride a horse, Frank enlists in the infantry with three co-workers from the railway, Bill, Barney and Snowy. Many of the motivations for enlistment are revealed: wartime anti-German propaganda, a sense of adventure and the attraction of the uniform. All soldiers embark on a transport ship bound for Cairo. Frank and Archy are separated and embark on different troopships.

Some months later, Frank and his fellow soldiers train near the Pyramids and spend their free time in Cairo, drinking and visiting brothels. During a training exercise, Frank and Archy meet once again; Frank is able to transfer to the Light Horse, as they are now being sent to the Gallipoli peninsula as infantry. They arrive at Anzac Cove and endure several days of hardships and boredom in the trenches. Frank's infantry friends fight in the Battle of Lone Pine on 6 August. Afterwards, a traumatised Billy tells Frank what happened to the others, Barney has been killed and Snowy is in a hospital but in such bad condition that he is denied food and water. The following morning, Archy and Frank are ordered to take part in the charge at the Nek, a diversion in support of the British Landing at Suvla Bay. Archy is ordered by Major Barton to be the message runner. He declines the offer and recommends Frank for the role.

The Light Horse are to attack in three waves across a stretch of ground defended by Ottoman machine gunners. The first wave is to go at 4:30 a.m., after an artillery bombardment. Unfortunately, the commanders' watches are not synchronised and the bombardment ends too early. The brigade's commander, Colonel Robinson, insists the Anzac attack proceed; the first wave is cut down by the Ottomans within seconds. The second wave goes over, to a similar fate, Les among them. Major Barton wants to halt the attack to end the carnage, but the Colonel says that somebody told him Anzac marker flags were seen in the Turkish trenches, indicating that the attack was partially successful. The phone line goes dead, and Barton gives Frank a message to carry to Brigade HQ, but when he arrives, the Colonel insists the attack continue.

Lieutenant Gray, Major Barton's second-in-command, admits to Barton that he was the soldier who said that he saw marker flags, though he did not remember who told him. Frank suggests to the Major that he go over the Colonel's head to General Gardner. Frank hurries to Gardner's headquarters down on the beach. The General is informed that, at Suvla, the British landing party is brewing tea on the beach. He tells Frank that he is reconsidering the attack. Frank sprints back to convey this news, but the phone lines are repaired and Colonel Robinson orders the attack to continue. Barton joins his men in the attack, climbs out of the trench pistol in hand, and signals his men to charge. Archy joins the last wave and goes over the top. Frank arrives seconds too late and lets out a scream of anguish and despair. As Archy's companions are cut down by gunfire, he drops his rifle and runs as hard as he can. The final frame freezes on Archy being hit by bullets across his chest, head flung back, as if breaking the tape at the finish of a 100-yard sprint, and falling backwards.

== Cast ==
- Mark Lee as Archy Hamilton
- Mel Gibson as Frank Dunne
- Bill Kerr as Jack
- Harold Hopkins as Les McCann
- Charles Yunupingu as Zac
- Ron Graham as Wallace Hamilton
- Gerda Nicolson as Rose Hamilton
- Robert Grubb as Billy (Lewis)
- Tim McKenzie as Barney (Wilson)
- David Argue as Snowy (G. S. Wilkes)
- Steve Dodd as Billy Snakeskin
- Robyn Galwey as Mary
- Don Quin as Lionel
- Phyllis Burford as Laura
- Marjorie Irving as Gran
- Bill Hunter as Major Barton
- Diane Chamberlain as Mrs Barton
- Peter Ford as Lieutenant Gray
- Geoff Parry as Sergeant Sayers
- John Morris as Colonel Robinson
- Stan Green as Sergeant Major
- Max Wearing as Colonel White
- Jack Giddy as Athletics Official #2
- Paul Sonkkila
- David Williamson made a cameo as an Australian soldier playing a game of Australian rules football in Egypt.

== Themes ==
A theme of this film is loss of innocence and the coming of age of the Australian soldiers and of their country. An early scene in the film shows Uncle Jack reading from Rudyard Kipling's The Jungle Book about how Mowgli has reached manhood and now must leave the family of wolves that raised him. The actor Mel Gibson commented, "Gallipoli was the birth of a nation. It was the shattering of a dream for Australia. They had banded together to fight the Hun and died by the thousands in a dirty little trench war." In an examination of Gallipoli's legacy, SBS Movies notes "The soldiers of Gallipoli head to war because it is expected of them, just as Australia headed to war because, as part of the British Empire, it was expected of the nation.

== Production ==
Peter Weir had wanted to make a film about the Gallipoli campaign since visiting Gallipoli in 1976 and discovering an empty Eno bottle on the beach. He wrote an outline of the script and gave it to David Williamson to turn into a screenplay. The script went through many variations; the South Australian Film Corporation did not like an early draft and said they did not want to fund the film, which then had a proposed budget of A$4.5 million. In May 1979 Weir asked Patricia Lovell to produce the film. The script then began to focus on the story of two runners. Lovell managed to raise A$850,000, which was not enough to make the film.

=== Pre-production ===
On 1 May 1980 Rupert Murdoch and Robert Stigwood announced they were forming a film company, R&R Films, later known as Associated R&R Films. This was a joint venture between News Corporation and the Robert Stigwood Organisation. They pledged an investment total of A$10m in local productions, with Gallipoli being the first but the company did not produce any more films. Lovell approached them with the script, and they agreed to fund it provided the budget did not exceed $3 million. He later said the final budget was $2.8 million, or $2.4 million with the rest consisting of fees. This was the highest budget of an Australian film to date. Murdoch's father, Keith Murdoch, had been a journalist during World War I, and after visiting Gallipoli in September 1915 became an influential agitator against the conduct of the campaign by the British high command.

Francis O'Brien, the only American in the company, was appointed international president of the company, and became executive producer of the film. Ben Gannon returned from the U.S. in 1980 join the company as general manager, and was associate producer of the film. He spent two years with the company, which he later described as "very frustrating". R&R had intended to develop more Australian films, with Australian directors and writers, with the next project slated as a film based on Gabrielle Lord's novel Fortress. (Note: This apparently never came to pass, with Fortress (1985) made by Crawford Productions.)

The company was first registered with the Australian Securities & Investments Commission on 13 August 1980 as R&R Films Pty Ltd, and is still registered as of April 2022 with its address listed as News Corp Australia's Surry Hills headquarters.

=== Casting ===
Peter Weir cast Mel Gibson in the role of the cynical Frank Dunne, and newcomer Mark Lee was recruited to play the idealistic Archy Hamilton, after participating in a photo session for the director. Gibson described the film as "Not really a war movie. That's just the backdrop. It's really the story of two young men". Gibson explained the director's reasons for casting the two leads

I'd auditioned for an earlier film and he told me right up front, 'I'm not going to cast you for this part. You're not old enough. But thanks for coming in, I just wanted to meet you'. He told me he wanted me for Gallipoli a couple of years later because I wasn't the archetypal Australian. He had Mark Lee, the angelic-looking, ideal Australian kid, and he wanted something of a modern sensibility. He thought the audience needed someone to relate to of their own time.

=== Filming ===
Gallipoli was filmed primarily in South Australia. The cattle station scenes were shot in Beltana, the salt lake at Lake Torrens, and Adelaide railway station. The pyramid and bazaar scenes were filmed on location in Egypt. The farewell ball scene was not in the original script but was an idea of Weir's during shooting. It cost an extra $60,000 to make.

A large set recreating the Turkish Gallipoli peninsula was built on a stretch of coastline 30 miles (48 km) west of Port Lincoln. It has been known as Gallipoli beach ever since. With its legacy, an Anzac war memorial honouring those who fell in the Gallipoli campaign has been erected near the beach.

== Soundtrack ==
The original music was provided by Australian composer Brian May (who had also scored Mad Max). The film includes excerpts from Oxygène by French electronic music pioneer Jean Michel Jarre during running scenes. Quiet or sombre moments at Gallipoli, and the closing credits, feature the Adagio in G minor, by Tomaso Albinoni.

The film also features the Pearl Fishers' Duet by Georges Bizet playing on Major Barton's gramophone before the final attack, drawing a parallel between the bond shared by the ill-fated soldiers of the film and the fishermen in Bizet's opera.

A soundtrack album was not released.

== Release ==
The film was screened at the Variety Club of Australia in 1980 and at the 1981 Australian Film Institute. It was released in Australia on 13 August 1981 by Roadshow Film Distributors, in the United States on 28 August, by Paramount Pictures, and Cinema International Corporation handled the rest of international distribution. It was released in UK cinemas on 10 December 1981.

On 1 May 1981, the Australian Classification Review Board announced that the film would receive a PG certificate rating.

Film Comment wrote that "Paramount apparently lavished substantial print-ad spending in an effort to create a broad market for a specialized film that faltered beyond first-run -as did virtually every other 1981 film on which this strategy was used."

== Reception ==
The film has an approval rating of 91% based on 46 reviews at review aggregator site Rotten Tomatoes, with an average score of 8/10. The site's critical consensus states, "Peter Weir's devastating anti-war film features a low-key but emotionally wrenching performance from Mel Gibson as a young soldier fighting in one of World War I's most deadly and horrifying battles". Metacritic gives the film a score of 65 out of a possible 100 based on reviews by six critics, indicating generally favourable reviews. Almost 40 years on, the film is still well regarded by Australian critics with Guardian film critic, Luke Buckmaster, describing it as "one of the best loved and most quintessially 'Australian' films". Irrespective of the generally positive critical reception, the historical accuracy of the film still provokes historical cultural debates by commentators.

== Box office ==
Gallipoli proved to be a domestic success, grossing A$11.7 million at the Australian box office. Although the film was widely acclaimed by critics internationally, its box-office success outside Australia was modest. It earned US$5.7 million in the United States, where it was distributed in arthouse cinemas. In France, the film only attracted 39,227 spectators.

== Awards & nominations ==
The film was nominated for or won the following awards:

Award	Category	Subject	Result
AACTA Awards (1981 Australian Film Institute Awards)	Best Film	Robert Stigwood and Patricia Lovell	Won
AACTA Awards (1981 Australian Film Institute Awards)	Best Direction	Peter Weir	Won
AACTA Awards (1981 Australian Film Institute Awards)	Best Screenplay, Original or Adapted	David Williamson	Won
AACTA Awards (1981 Australian Film Institute Awards)	Best Actor	Mel Gibson	Won
AACTA Awards (1981 Australian Film Institute Awards)	Best Actor	Mark Lee	Nominated
AACTA Awards (1981 Australian Film Institute Awards)	Best Supporting Actor	Bill Hunter	Won
AACTA Awards (1981 Australian Film Institute Awards)	Best Supporting Actor	Bill Kerr	Nominated
AACTA Awards (1981 Australian Film Institute Awards)	Best Cinematography	Russell Boyd	Won
AACTA Awards (1981 Australian Film Institute Awards)	Best Costume Design	Terry Ryan and Wendy Stites	Nominated
AACTA Awards (1981 Australian Film Institute Awards)	Best Editing	William M. Anderson	Won
AACTA Awards (1981 Australian Film Institute Awards)	Best Production Design	Herbert Pinter and Wendy Stites	Nominated
AACTA Awards (1981 Australian Film Institute Awards)	Best Sound	Greg Bell, Don Connolly and Peter Fenton	Won
Australian Cinematographers Society	Cinematographer of the Year	Russell Boyd	Won
AWGIE Award	Feature Film - Original	David Williamson	Won
Golden Globe Award	Best Foreign Film		Nominated
National Board of Review	Top Ten Films		Won
Venice Film Festival	Golden Lion	Peter Weir	Nominated

== Home media ==
The film was first released in Australia on VHS in 1984.

In 2001 Gallipoli was released for the first time on DVD widescreen with two extra features, an interview with director Peter Weir and cinema trailer.

In 2005 a North American and 2006 (UK) Special Collector's Edition DVD was released with a different extra feature and includes a 63-minute documentary titled Entrenched: The Making of Gallipoli with interviews from the cast and crew and production.

A 2015 2-disc Commemorative Edition was released by 20th Century Fox Home Entertainment on DVD and for the first time, on Digital HD and Blu-ray exclusively in Australia.

== Historical accuracy ==
Gallipoli shows much of the conditions and events that soldiers endured in the Gallipoli theatre of war. Archy Hamilton's athlete character was inspired by a line from Australian war historian Charles Bean's Official History of Australia in the War of 1914–1918, describing Private Wilfred Harper of the 10th Light Horse during the forlorn Battle of the Nek, "Wilfred... was last seen running forward like a schoolboy in a foot-race, with all the speed he could compass". An officer, who wrote a letter to Harper's mother, stated "Wilfred I believe was one of the few who got at most twenty yards".

The most notable deviation of the film from the truth and the one for which it has been most criticised, is its portrayal of the chain of command at the Nek. Although he is seen wearing an AIF uniform, Colonel Robinson is often mistaken for an Englishman due to his accent. Colonel Robinson speaks with a clipped accent typical for an upper class Australian of the period. Colonel Robinson's character was based on the brigade major of the 3rd Brigade, Colonel John Antill, an Australian Boer War veteran. Very little British command and control was exercised at the Nek.

In his popular history Gallipoli, published in 2001, Les Carlyon agreed that the film unfairly portrays the British during the battle, with Carlyon laying the blame for the debacle squarely at the feet of Antill and 3rd Australian Light Horse Brigade commander, Brigadier-General Frederic Hughes, "The scale of the tragedy of the Nek was mostly the work of two Australian incompetents, Hughes and Antill". The film implies that the fictional and benevolent General Gardiner called off the attack, when in reality the attack petered out when half of the 4th wave charged without orders while the surviving regimental commander in the trenches, Lieutenant-Colonel Noel Brazier, attempted to get the attack called off.

Other critics, Carlyon included, have pointed out that the Australian attack at the Nek was a diversion for the New Zealand Expeditionary Force's attack at the Battle of Sari Bair, not the British landing at Suvla. The British were therefore not "drinking tea on the beach" while Australians died for them. Two companies of a British regiment, the Royal Welch Fusiliers, suffered many losses trying to support the Australian attack at the Nek once it was realised that the attack was in trouble.

Some have also criticised the film for its portrayal of British officers and their disdain for Australian discipline behind the lines. According to Robert Rhodes James, no evidence for any such disdain on the part of British commanders for their Australian troops exists.

== See also ==
- Cinema of Australia
- World War I in popular culture
- Landing at Anzac Cove
- Battle of the Nek
- Battle of Lone Pine
- Gallipoli (2005 film) - a documentary
- Chunuk Bair
