= Picnic at Hanging Rock (film) =

1975 film by Peter Weir

- Theatrical release poster
- Directed by: Peter Weir
- Screenplay by: Cliff Green
- Based on: Picnic at Hanging Rock by Joan Lindsay
- Produced by: Hal McElroy; Jim McElroy
- Starring: Rachel Roberts; Dominic Guard; Helen Morse; Vivean Gray; Jacki Weaver
- Cinematography: Russell Boyd
- Edited by: Max Lemon
- Music by: Gheorghe Zamfir; Bruce Smeaton
- Production companies: B.E.F. Film Distributors; South Australian Film Corporation; Australian Film Commission; McElroy & McElroy; Picnic Productions
- Distributed by: B.E.F. Film Distributors
- Release date: 8 August 1975
- Running time: 115 minutes
- Country: Australia
- Language: English
- Budget: A$443,000–480,000
- Box office: A$5.12 million (Australia)

Picnic at Hanging Rock is a 1975 Australian mystery film directed by Peter Weir from a screenplay by Cliff Green, based on the 1967 novel by Joan Lindsay. The film stars Rachel Roberts, Dominic Guard, Helen Morse, Vivean Gray and Jacki Weaver. The plot involves the disappearance of several schoolgirls and their teacher during a picnic at Hanging Rock, Victoria on Valentine's Day in 1900, and the subsequent effect on the local community.

Picnic at Hanging Rock was a commercial and critical success, and helped draw international attention to the then-emerging Australian New Wave of cinema. In 2011, Green called it "Australia's most loved movie". In 1996 it was voted the best Australian movie of all time in a poll by the Victorian Centenary of Cinema Committee and the NFSA.

== Plot ==
On Valentine's Day 1900, students from Appleyard College, a girls' private school in Victoria, Australia, embark on a picnic to Hanging Rock led by teachers Miss Greta McCraw and Mlle de Poitiers. Sara, a quiet child who arrived at the school from an orphanage and continues to suffer from the separation from her brother Bertie, is forced to stay behind. She remains at the school with teacher Miss Lumley and stern headmistress Mrs Appleyard.

At Hanging Rock, the students settle down to their picnic; the teachers worry about the time, as the only two available watches have both stopped at exactly noon. Miranda, Marion, Irma, and Edith ask permission to explore the area. As they head to the Rock they are observed by a young Englishman, Michael Fitzhubert, and his Australian friend, Albert Crundall. The girls begin climbing, and fall asleep under a strange influence. When they awaken, Miranda, Marion and Irma proceed in a trance into a crevice. Edith, distressed, watches them go before screaming and fleeing back down alone.

Mlle de Poitiers and the remaining students return to Appleyard College hours later than expected, having not found Miranda, Marion or Irma, and reporting that Miss McCraw has also gone missing. The police undertake their own search the next day without success. Edith provides a disjointed account in which she recalls seeing a strange red cloud and Miss McCraw running towards the Rock without her skirt on.

After having nightmares about the girls' disappearances, Michael returns to search for them with Albert’s assistance. He stays overnight at the Rock, and the next day discovers Irma unconscious in a crevice, barefoot and without corset or stockings. Michael staggers out and collapses. Alarmed by his overnight absence, Albert returns with the police and finds Michael unconscious. As he is carried to the carriage, Michael passes Albert a torn scrap of Irma’s dress. Albert goes back to the rock and locates Irma, who has no memory of what happened.

Miranda, Marion, and Miss McCraw remain missing; their unexplained disappearances cause a scandal, leading to girls being withdrawn from the school. News attention begins to intrude, and locals speculate about sexual motives, rape and murder. As the school's reputation and financial stability suffer, Mrs Appleyard informs Sara that her guardian has not contacted the College in months, that her tuition fees have not been paid, and that she is therefore no longer permitted to participate in extracurricular lessons. Sara spends much of her time in bed, mourning Miranda. Michael's dreams continue, with Miranda symbolized by the presence of a white swan.

Irma, physically recovered but still having no memory of the events on the day of the picnic, is to be sent back to Europe to join her parents. She visits the College during an exercise class to bid the rest of the students farewell, and is screamed at by classmates who believe her to be culpable and demand she tell them what happened. After Irma departs in tears, Mlle de Poitiers discovers that Miss Lumley has restrained Sara against a wall under the guise of improving her posture.

The night before the Easter vacation begins, Mrs Appleyard informs Sara that, as her fees remain unpaid, she must return to the orphanage. Mrs Appleyard falsely tells Mlle de Poitiers that Sara's guardian came to collect her and evades her attempts to ask whether Sara will be returning next term.

Albert recounts to Michael a vivid dream in which his sister Sara visited him: "'Goodbye, Bertie,' she says. 'l’ve come a long way to see ya, and now I must go.' And she went." Sara's dead body is discovered in a greenhouse adjacent to the school building, having fallen from above; a gardener rushes to Mrs Appleyard's office to report the tragedy and finds her sitting calmly at her desk wearing funeral attire. A voiceover reports that Mrs Appleyard, facing the collapse of her school and haunted by the disappearances and ensuing events, was later found dead at the base of Hanging Rock, having apparently fallen while climbing it. Accompanied by a flashback to the day of the picnic, the voiceover states that the disappearance of Miranda, Marion, and Miss McCraw remains an unsolved mystery that continues to haunt the local community.

== Cast ==
- Rachel Roberts as Mrs Appleyard
- Dominic Guard as Michael Fitzhubert
- Helen Morse as Mlle. de Poitiers
- Jacki Weaver as Minnie
- Anne-Louise Lambert as Miranda St. Clare
- Margaret Nelson as Sara Waybourne
- John Jarratt as Albert Crundall
- Wyn Roberts as Sergeant Bumpher
- Karen Robson as Irma Leopold
- Christine Schuler as Edith Horton
- Jane Vallis as Marion Quade
- Vivean Gray as Miss Greta McCraw
- Martin Vaughan as Ben Hussey
- Kirsty Child as Miss Lumley
- Frank Gunnell as Mr Whitehead
- Tony Llewellyn-Jones as Tom
- John Fegan as Doctor McKenzie
- Kay Taylor as Mrs Bumpher
- Peter Collingwood as Colonel Fitzhubert
- Garry McDonald as Constable Jones
- Olga Dickie as Mrs Fitzhubert
- Jenny Lovell as Blanche

== Production ==
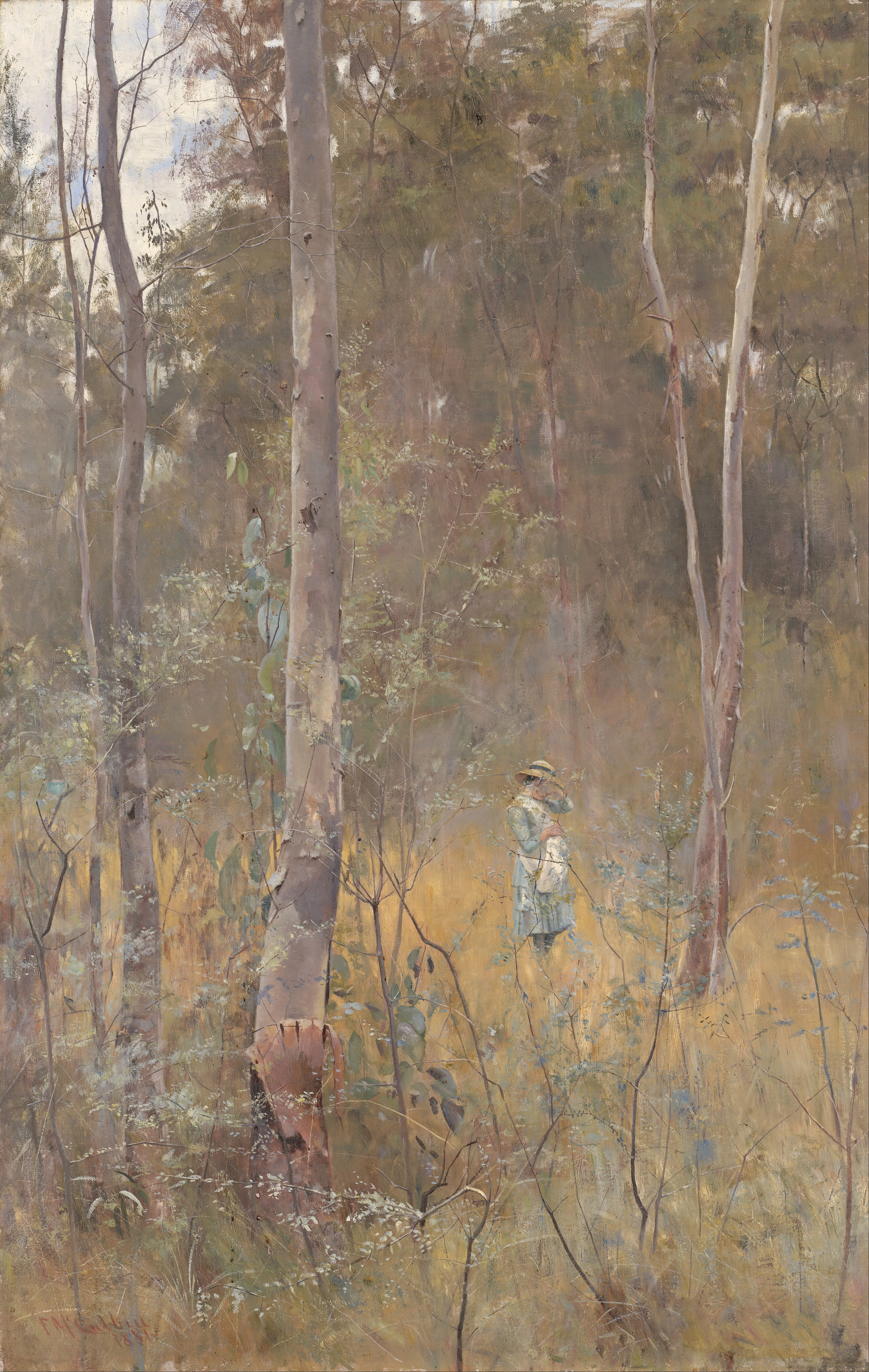
Works of Australian Impressionism, such as Frederick McCubbin's Lost (1886), inspired the film's themes and visual style.

Joan Lindsay's novel was published in 1967. Reading it four years later, Patricia Lovell thought it would make a good film. She did not originally think of producing it herself until Phillip Adams suggested she try it; she optioned the film rights in 1973, paying $100 for three months. She hired Peter Weir to direct on the basis of his film Homesdale, and Weir brought in Hal and Jim McElroy to help produce.

Screenwriter David Williamson originally was chosen to adapt the film, but was unavailable and recommended noted TV writer Cliff Green. Joan Lindsay had approval over who did the adaptation and she gave it to Green, whose first draft Lovell says was "excellent".

The finalised budget was A$440,000, coming from the Australian Film Development Corporation, British Empire Films and the South Australian Film Corporation. $3,000 came from private investors.

=== Filming ===
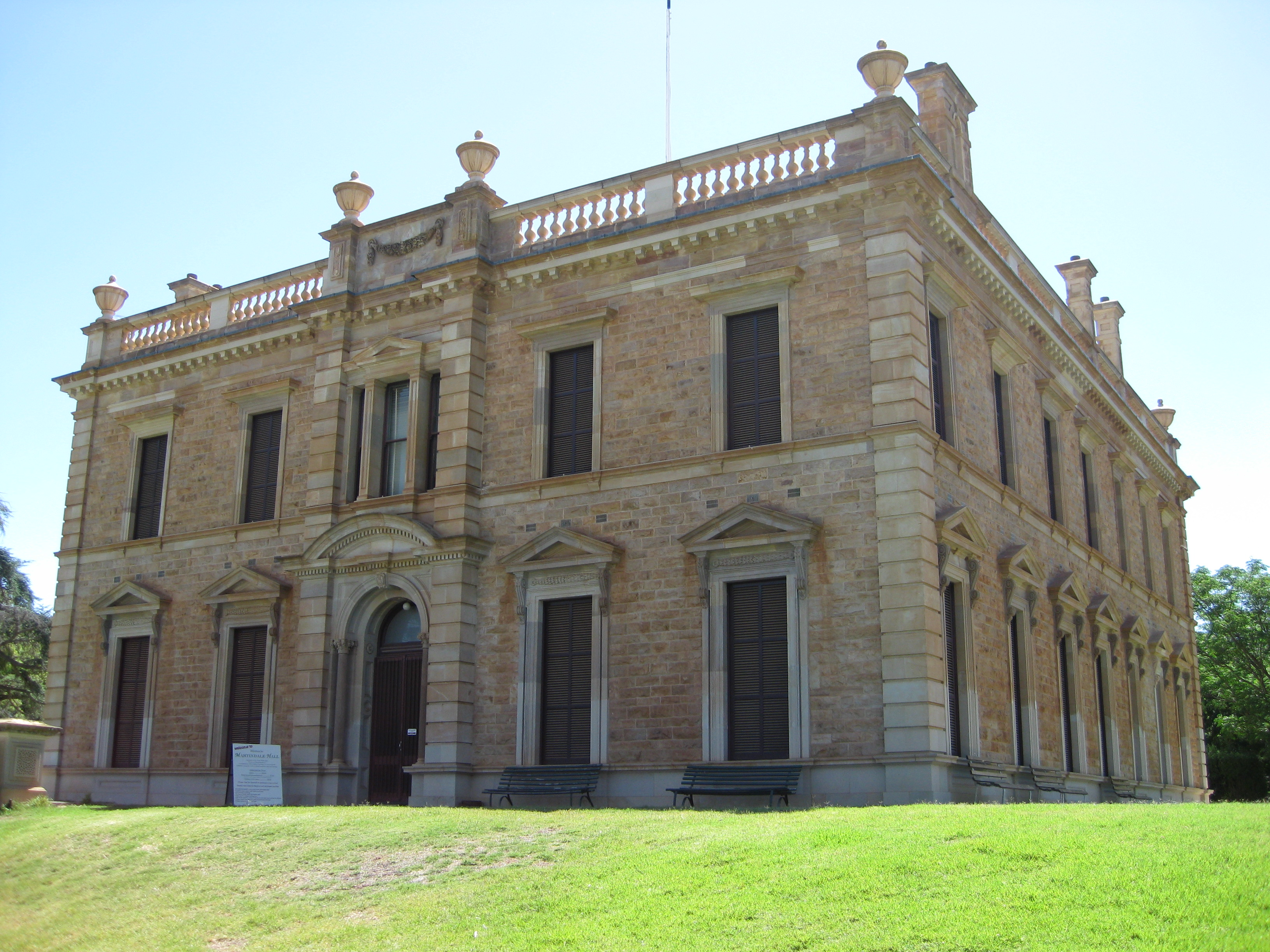
Martindale Hall (located near Mintaro in South Australia), was the location for Appleyard Hall, the school featured in the film.

Filming began in February 1975 with principal photography taking six weeks. Locations included Hanging Rock, Martindale Hall near Mintaro, South Australia, and at the studio of the South Australian Film Corporation in Adelaide.

The film's mise-en-scène and cinematography were strongly influenced by the work of the Heidelberg School of Australian impressionist painters, active in Victoria in the 1880s and 1890s. Leading Heidelberg School member Frederick McCubbin also lived in and often painted the Macedon Ranges, the setting and filming location of Picnic at Hanging Rock. To achieve the look of a Heidelberg School painting for the film, director Weir and director of cinematography Russell Boyd were inspired by the work of British photographer and film director David Hamilton, who had draped different types of veils over his camera lens to produce diffused and soft-focus images. Boyd created the ethereal, dreamy look of many scenes by placing simple bridal veil fabric of various thicknesses over his camera lens. The film was edited by Max Lemon.

Weir recalled that while many in the cast and crew took the film in a humorous and jocular manner when filming began, the mood changed once location work began on Hanging Rock:

There is just something about the area that is oppressive and depressing. Absolutely nothing unusual happened while we were there, but everyone was nervous while we were there, and we were all glad to get away at last.

=== Casting ===
Weir originally cast Ingrid Mason as Miranda, but realised after several weeks of rehearsals that it was "not working" and cast Anne-Louise Lambert. Mason was persuaded to remain in the production as a minor character, Rosamund, by producer Patricia Lovell. The role of Mrs Appleyard was originally to have been taken by Vivien Merchant; Merchant fell ill and Rachel Roberts was cast at short notice. Several of the schoolgirls' voices were dubbed in secret by professional voice actors, as Weir had cast the young actresses for their innocent appearance rather than their acting ability. The voice actors were not credited, although more than three decades later, actress Barbara Llewellyn revealed that she had provided the voice for all the dialogue of Edith (Christine Schuler, now Christine Lawrance).

=== Music ===
The main title music was derived from the traditional Romanian pan flute pieces "Doina: Sus Pe Culmea Dealului" and "Doina Lui Petru Unc", with Gheorghe Zamfir playing the pan flute and Marcel Cellier the organ. Australian composer Bruce Smeaton also provided several original compositions for the film.

Other classical additions included Bach's Prelude No. 1 in C from The Well-Tempered Clavier performed by pianist Jenő Jandó, the Romance movement from Mozart's Eine kleine Nachtmusik, the Andante cantabile movement from Tchaikovsky's String Quartet No. 1, Op. 11, and the Adagio un poco mosso from Beethoven's Piano Concerto No. 5 "Emperor" performed by István Antal with the Hungarian State Symphony Orchestra. Traditional British songs "God Save the Queen" and "Men of Harlech" also appear.

There is currently no official soundtrack commercially available. In 1976, CBS released a vinyl LP titled "A Theme from Picnic at Hanging Rock", a track of the same name and "Miranda's Theme". A 7" single was released in 1976 of the main theme performed by the Nolan-Buddle Quartet. The song peaked at number 15 on the Australian singles chart. An album Flute de Pan et Orgue (Music from Picnic at Hanging Rock) was released by Festival Records France.

== Theatrical release ==
The film premiered on 8 August 1975, at the Hindley Cinema Complex in Adelaide. It was well received by audiences and critics alike. By 1978 it had made more than $3 million in Australian cinemas. It eventually grossed $5,120,000 (equivalent to $40,863,759 in 2022) in box office sales in Australia.

In 1998, Weir removed seven minutes from the film for a theatrical re-release, creating a shorter 107-minute director's cut.

In 2025, the film was restored in 4K resolution and re-released theatrically for its 50th anniversary.

== Reception ==
Horror need not always be a long-fanged gentleman in evening clothes or a dismembered corpse or a doctor who keeps a brain in his gold fish bowl. It may be a warm sunny day, the innocence of girlhood and hints of unexplored sexuality that combine to produce a euphoria so intense it becomes transporting, a state beyond life or death. Such horror is unspeakable not because it is gruesome but because it remains outside the realm of things that can be easily defined or explained in conventional ways."

— Vincent Canby, writing about the film for The New York Times

Weir recalled that when the film was first screened in the United States, American audiences were disturbed by the fact that the mystery remained unsolved. According to Weir, "One distributor threw his coffee cup at the screen at the end of it, because he'd wasted two hours of his life—a mystery without a goddamn solution!" Critic Vincent Canby noted this reaction among audiences in a 1979 review of the film, in which he discussed the film's elements of artistic "Australian horror romance", albeit one without the cliches of a conventional horror film.

Despite this, the film was a critical success. American film critic Roger Ebert called it "a film of haunting mystery and buried sexual hysteria" and remarked that it "employs two of the hallmarks of modern Australian films: beautiful cinematography and stories about the chasm between settlers from Europe and the mysteries of their ancient new home." Richard Freedman of The Star-Ledger wrote: "it is so drenched in the sensuality of a time and way of life long passed that it is a sheer pleasure for weary 20th Century eyes to behold. Yet it has a unique sensibility of its own. By giving us the materials to fashion our own work of art, it performs a function given only to the highest art: it makes us think as it fills us with awe and wonder."

Joseph Bensou of the Daily Breeze praised Weir's direction, writing that "It's an arty film... And like the artist, Weir insists on layering colors and depth to his mystery ever so slowly and deliberately, adding a stroke of character here and a brush of suspense there." He also notes the "convincing" performances of the cast, especially Mrs Appleyard, "played with a touch of evil" by Rachel Roberts, and Sara Waybourne, "played effortlessly" by Margaret Nelson.

Cliff Green stated in interview that "Writing the film and later through its production, did I—or anyone else—predict that it would become Australia's most loved movie? We always knew it was going to be good—but that good? How could we?"

Picnic at Hanging Rock currently has an approval rating of 94% on Rotten Tomatoes based on 51 reviews, with an average rating of 8.5/10. The site's critical consensus reads: "Visually mesmerizing, Picnic at Hanging Rock is moody, unsettling, and enigmatic -- a masterpiece of Australian cinema and a major early triumph for director Peter Weir". Metacritic, another review aggregator, gives the film a score of 81/100 based on 15 critics, indicating "universal acclaim".

== Accolades ==
Award	Category	Subject	Result
AACTA Awards	Best Film	Hal and Jim McElroy	Nominated
AACTA Awards	Best Direction	Peter Weir	Nominated
AACTA Awards	Best Actress	Helen Morse	Nominated
AACTA Awards	Best Actor in a Supporting Role	Tony Llewellyn-Jones	Nominated
AACTA Awards	Best Screenplay	Cliff Green	Nominated
AACTA Awards	Best Cinematography	Russell Boyd	Nominated
British Academy Film Awards	Best Cinematography	Russell Boyd	Won
British Academy Film Awards	Best Costume Design	Judith Dorsman	Nominated
British Academy Film Awards	Best Soundtrack	Greg Bell and Dan Connelly	Nominated
British Society of Cinematographers	Best Cinematography	Russell Boyd	Nominated
Saturn Awards	Best Writing	Cliff Green	Nominated
Saturn Awards	Best Cinematography	Russell Boyd	Honored

== Home media ==
The director's cut was released on DVD in the US by The Criterion Collection on 3 November 1998. This release featured a new transfer of the film, a theatrical trailer and liner notes. The Criterion Collection released the director's cut on Blu-ray in the US on 17 June 2014, including a paperback copy of the novel and a number of featurettes.

In the UK, the film was released in a special 3-disc DVD set on 30 June 2008. This set included both the director's cut and the longer original cut, the feature-length documentary A Dream Within a Dream, deleted scenes, interviews with the filmmakers and the book's author Joan Lindsay, poster and still galleries. UK distributor Second Sight Films released the film on Blu-ray in the UK on 26 July 2010.

In Australia it was released on DVD by Umbrella Entertainment in August 2007, and re-released in a 2-disc Collector's Edition in May 2011. This edition includes special features including theatrical trailers, poster and still galleries, documentaries and interviews with cast, crew and Joan Lindsay. It was released on Blu-ray in Australia by Umbrella Entertainment on 12 May 2010, including the feature-length documentary A Dream Within a Dream, a 25-minute on-set documentary titled A Recollection: Hanging Rock 1900 and the theatrical trailer.

The film has since been released on 4K in various countries, including the US (by Criterion) and the UK.

== Legacy and influence ==
Picnic at Hanging Rock was voted the best Australian film of all time by members of the Australian Film Institute, industry guilds and unions, film critics and reviewers, academics and media teachers, and Kookaburra Card members of the National Film and Sound Archive (NFSA), in a 1996 poll organised by the Victorian Centenary of Cinema Committee and the NFSA.

In 2025 the film was restored for release into cinemas. Under Weir's supervision, a new 4K scan of the original 35mm negative from the NFSA was undertaken by The Grainery (US) and Fixafilm (Poland). Coincident with the release, Text Publishing issued a biography of Joan Lindsay by Brenda Niall, which describes the influence of Lindsay's experiences at school on the book, as well as the continuing cultural legacy of the book and film.

Director Sofia Coppola's films The Virgin Suicides and Marie Antoinette were heavily influenced by Picnic at Hanging Rock. Both films, like Picnic at Hanging Rock, deal extensively with themes of death and femininity as well as adolescent perceptions of love and sexuality.

American television writer Damon Lindelof said that the film was an influence on the second season of the television show The Leftovers.

Director Zach Cregger cited this film as an influence on Weapons, particularly its depiction of the unexplained disappearance and unusual behaviour of children. Cregger described the film as "eerie and haunting" and said that it was difficult for him not to think of it when considering Weapons.

== See also ==
- Picnic at Hanging Rock, a 2018 television adaptation of the novel
- List of films set around Valentine's Day
