= Peter Weir =

Australian filmmaker (born 1944)

Peter Weir AM
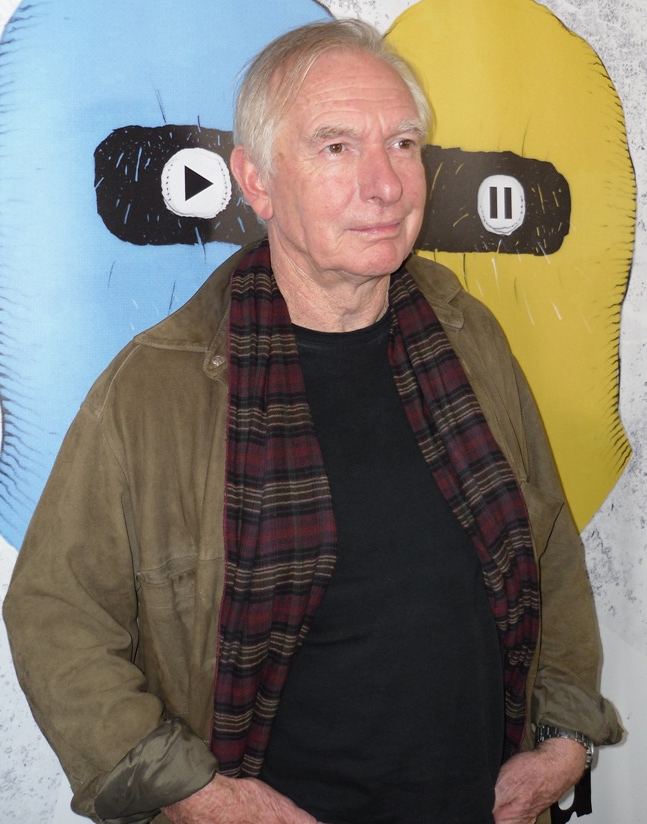
- Weir in 2011
- Born: Peter Lindsay Weir; 21 August 1944 (age 82); Sydney, New South Wales, Australia
- Other name: Peter L. Weir
- Education: University of Sydney
- Occupations: Film director; screenwriter; film producer
- Years active: 1967–2010
- Spouse: Wendy Stites (m. 1966)
- Children: 2

Signature
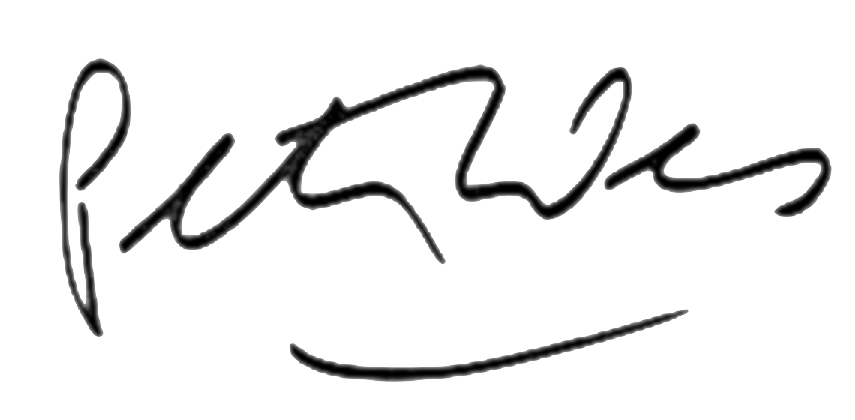

Peter Lindsay Weir AM (/wɪər/ WEER; born 21 August 1944) is an Australian retired film director, screenwriter, and producer. He directed films crossing various genres over forty years, such as Homesdale (1971), Picnic at Hanging Rock (1975), The Plumber (1979), Gallipoli (1981), The Year of Living Dangerously (1982), Witness (1985), The Mosquito Coast (1986), Dead Poets Society (1989), Fearless (1993), The Truman Show (1998), Master and Commander: The Far Side of the World (2003), and The Way Back (2010). He has received six Academy Award nominations and he has won two AACTA Award for Best Direction and two BAFTA Award for Best Direction. In 2022, he was awarded the Academy Honorary Award for his lifetime career achievement. In 2024, he received an honorary life-time achievement award at the Venice Film Festival (Golden Lion).

Early in his career as a director, Weir was a leading figure in the Australian New Wave cinema movement (1970–1990). Weir made his feature film debut with The Cars That Ate Paris (1974), and continued with the mystery drama Picnic at Hanging Rock (1975), the supernatural thriller The Last Wave (1977) and the historical drama Gallipoli (1981). Weir gained tremendous success with the multinational production The Year of Living Dangerously (1982).

After the success of The Year of Living Dangerously, Weir directed a diverse group of American and international films covering most genres—many of them major box office hits—including Academy Award–nominated films such as the thriller Witness (1985), the drama Dead Poets Society (1989), the romantic comedy Green Card (1990), the social science-fiction dramedy The Truman Show (1998) and the epic historical drama Master and Commander: The Far Side of the World (2003). His final feature before his retirement was The Way Back (2010).

== Early life and education ==
Peter Lindsay Weir was born in Sydney, in 1944, the son of Peggy (née Barnsley Sutton) and Lindsay Weir, a real estate agent. Weir attended The Scots College and Vaucluse Boys High School before studying arts and law at the University of Sydney. His interest in film was sparked by him meeting fellow students, including Phillip Noyce and the future members of the Sydney filmmaking collective Ubu Films.

== Career ==
=== 1960s ===
After leaving university in the mid-1960s, he joined Sydney television station ATN-7, where he worked as a production assistant on the groundbreaking satirical comedy program The Mavis Bramston Show. During this period, using station facilities, Weir made his first two experimental short films, Count Vim's Last Exercise and The Life and Flight of Reverend Buck Shotte. Count Vim's Last Exercise, which featured artist Harold Thornton, was released in 1968.

In 1969, the founders of Producers Authors Composers and Talent (now PACT Centre for Emerging Artists) attended a Sydney University Architecture Revue, with sets by Geoffrey Atherden and Grahame Bond. They invited Bond, Atherden, Weir, and Weir's friend, composer Peter Best, a chance to do a show at the National Art School. Sir Robert Helpmann saw the show and took it to the Adelaide Festival. Soon afterward Weir and Best were commissioned to write a Christmas special TV show for ABC Television titled Man on a Green Bike.

=== 1970s ===
Weir took a position with the Commonwealth Film Unit (later renamed Film Australia), for which he made several documentaries, as well as one fiction film, a section of the three-part, three-director feature film 3 to Go (1971), which won an AFI award. Another notable film in this period was the short rock music performance film Three Directions in Australian Pop Music (1972), which featured in-concert colour footage of three of the most significant Melbourne rock acts of the period, Spectrum, The Captain Matchbox Whoopee Band, and Wendy Saddington. Weir's last major work for the CFU concerned an underprivileged outer Sydney suburb, Whatever Happened to Green Valley (1973); here, residents were invited to make their own film segments.

Weir made his first major independent film, the short feature Homesdale (1971), an offbeat black comedy. It co-starred rising young actress Kate Fitzpatrick and musician and comedian Grahame Bond, who came to fame in 1972 as the star of The Aunty Jack Show; Weir also played a small role, but this was to be his last significant screen appearance.

Weir's first full-length feature film was the underground cult classic, The Cars That Ate Paris (1974), a low-budget black comedy about the inhabitants of a small country town who deliberately cause fatal car crashes and live off the proceeds. It was a minor success in cinemas but proved very popular on the then-thriving drive-in circuit. The plot had been inspired by a press report Weir had read about two young English women who had vanished while on a driving holiday in France. With this film, along with the earlier Homesdale, Weir set the basic thematic pattern which has persisted throughout his career: nearly all his feature films deal with people who face some form of crisis after finding themselves isolated from society in some way – either physically (Witness, The Mosquito Coast, The Truman Show, Master and Commander), socially/culturally (Picnic at Hanging Rock, The Last Wave, Dead Poets Society, Green Card), or psychologically (Fearless).

Weir's major breakthrough in Australia and internationally was the lush, atmospheric period mystery Picnic at Hanging Rock (1975), made with substantial backing from the state-funded South Australian Film Corporation and filmed on location in South Australia and rural Victoria. Based on the novel by Joan Lindsay and set at the turn of the 20th century, the film relates the purportedly "true" story of a group of students from an exclusive girls' school who mysteriously vanish from a school picnic on Valentine's Day 1900. Widely credited as a key work in the "Australian film renaissance" of the mid-1970s, Picnic was the first Australian film of its era to gain both critical praise and be given substantial international theatrical releases. It also helped launch the career of internationally renowned Australian cinematographer Russell Boyd. It was widely acclaimed by critics, many of whom praised it as a welcome antidote to the so-called "ocker film" genre, typified by The Adventures of Barry McKenzie and Alvin Purple.

Weir's next film, The Last Wave (1977), was a supernatural thriller about a man who begins to experience terrifying visions of an impending natural disaster. It starred American actor Richard Chamberlain, who was well known to Australian and world audiences as the eponymous physician in the popular Dr. Kildare TV series. He later starred in the major series The Thorn Birds, set in Australia. The Last Wave was a pensive, ambivalent work that expanded on themes from Picnic, exploring the interactions between the native Aboriginal and European cultures. It co-starred the Aboriginal actor David Gulpilil, whose performance won the Golden Ibex (Oscar equivalent) at the Tehran International Film Festival in 1977, but it was only a moderate commercial success at the time.

Between The Last Wave and his next feature, Weir wrote and directed the offbeat low-budget telemovie The Plumber (1979). It starred Australian actors Judy Morris and Ivar Kants and was filmed in three weeks. Inspired by an account told to him by friends, it is a black comedy about a woman whose life is disrupted by a subtly menacing plumber.

=== 1980s ===
Weir scored a major Australian hit and further international praise with his next film, the historical adventure-drama Gallipoli (1981). Scripted by the Australian playwright David Williamson, it is regarded as classic Australian cinema. Gallipoli was instrumental in making Mel Gibson (Mad Max) into a major star, although his co-star Mark Lee, who also received high praise for his role, has made relatively few screen appearances since.

The climax of Weir's early career was the $6 million multi-national production The Year of Living Dangerously (1982), again starring Gibson, playing opposite top Hollywood female lead Sigourney Weaver in a story about journalistic loyalty, idealism, love and ambition in the turmoil of Sukarno's Indonesia of 1965. It was an adaptation of the novel by Christopher Koch, which was based in part on the experiences of Koch's journalist brother Philip, the ABC's Jakarta correspondent and one of the few western journalists in the city during the 1965 attempted coup. The film also won Linda Hunt (who played a man in the film) an Oscar for Best Actress in a Supporting Role. The film was again produced by Hal and Jim McElroy, who had also produced Weir's first three films, The Cars That Ate Paris, Picnic at Hanging Rock and The Last Wave.

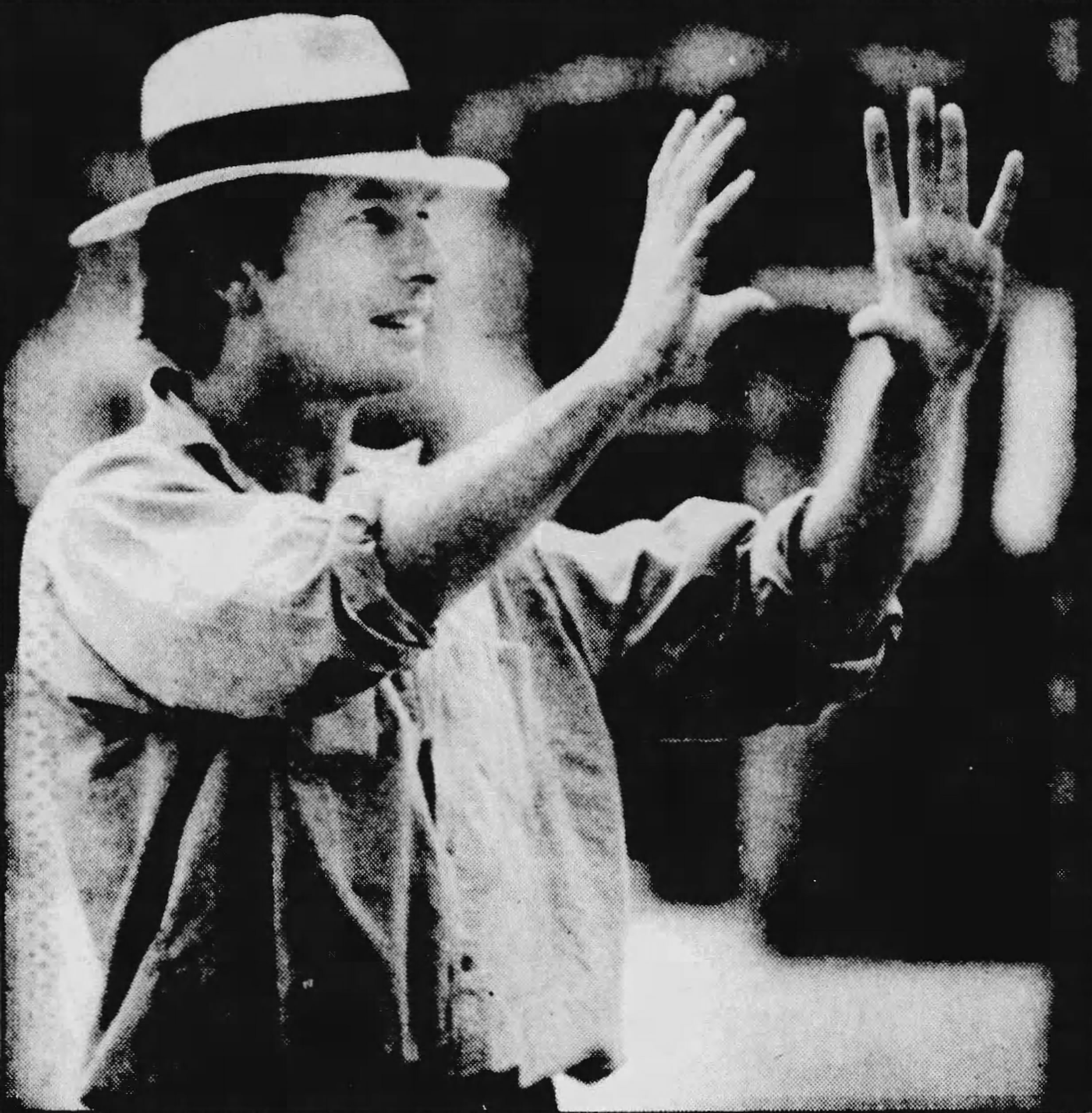
Weir on the set of Witness in 1984

Weir's first American film was the successful thriller Witness (1985), the first of two films he made with Harrison Ford, about a boy who sees the murder of an undercover police officer by corrupt coworkers and has to be hidden in his Amish community to protect him. Weir directed Ford in his only performance to receive an Academy Award nomination, while child star Lukas Haas also received wide praise for his debut film performance. Witness also earned Weir his first Academy Award nomination as Best Director, and was his first of several films to be nominated for an Academy Award for Best Picture—it later won two for Best Film Editing and Best Original Screenplay.

It was followed by the darker, less commercial The Mosquito Coast (1986), Paul Schrader's adaptation of Paul Theroux's novel.

Weir's next film, Dead Poets Society, was a major international success, with Weir again receiving credit for expanding the acting range of its Hollywood star. Robin Williams was mainly known for his anarchic stand-up comedy and his popular TV role as the wisecracking alien in Mork & Mindy; in this film he played an inspirational teacher in a dramatic story about conformity and rebellion at an exclusive New England prep school in the 1950s. The film was nominated for four Oscars, including Best Picture and Best Director for Weir. It won Best Original Screenplay and launched the acting careers of young actors Ethan Hawke and Robert Sean Leonard. It became a major box-office hit.

=== 1990s ===
Weir's first romantic comedy Green Card (1990) was another casting risk. Weir chose French screen icon Gérard Depardieu in the lead—Depardieu's first English-language role—and paired him with American actress Andie MacDowell. Green Card was a box-office hit but was regarded as less of a critical success, although it helped Depardieu's path to international fame. Weir received an Oscar nomination for his original screenplay.

Fearless (1993) returned to darker themes and starred Jeff Bridges as a man who believes he has become invincible after surviving a catastrophic air crash. Though well reviewed, particularly the performances of Bridges and Rosie Perez—who received an Oscar nomination for Best Supporting Actress—the film was less commercially successful than Weir's two preceding films. It was entered into the 44th Berlin International Film Festival.

After five years, Weir returned to direct his biggest success to date, The Truman Show (1998), a fantasy-satire of the media's control of life starring Jim Carrey. The Truman Show was both a box office and a critical success, receiving positive reviews and numerous awards, including three Academy Award nominations: Andrew Niccol for Best Original Screenplay, Ed Harris for Best Actor in a Supporting Role, and Weir himself for Best Director. In addition to the Academy Award nominations, the film won the 1999 Hugo Award for Best Dramatic Presentation.

=== 2000s ===
In 2003, Weir returned to period dramas with Master and Commander: The Far Side of the World, starring Russell Crowe. A screen adaptation from various episodes in Patrick O'Brian's blockbuster adventure series set during the Napoleonic Wars, the film was well received by critics, but only mildly successful with mainstream audiences. The film was nominated for Best Picture and won two Oscars—for frequent collaborator Russell Boyd's cinematography and for sound effects editing. While it underperformed at the North American box office and grossed $93 million, it had grossed slightly better overseas, gleaning an additional $118 million.

Weir had developed several other projects in the 2000s that never came to fruition, including an adaptation of Jasper Maskelyne's biography The War Magician with actor Tom Cruise, an adaptation of Robert Kurson's novel Shadow Divers, early development of a proposed Shantaram film starring Johnny Depp, and an adaptation of William Gibson's sci-fi novel Pattern Recognition.

=== 2010s ===
In 2010, Weir resurfaced with the historical epic The Way Back, about escapees from a Soviet gulag. The film, while generally well-received critically, was not a financial success.

In 2012, it was reported that Weir would direct his own adapted script of Jennifer Egan's gothic thriller The Keep the following year and shoot in Europe. Weir described the project as, "Basically, ... a studio-shoot movie." As the years passed, however, without an official announcement, he started to be described as "retired".

=== 2020s ===
Speaking in July 2022, speculating about Weir's unannounced retirement, Ethan Hawke said, "I think [Weir] lost interest in movies. He really enjoyed that work when he didn't have actors giving him a hard time. Russell Crowe and Johnny Depp broke him."

In November 2022, Weir received an Academy Honorary Award from the Academy of Motion Picture Arts and Sciences.

On the occasion of this award, he also gave his first interview in many years, to The Sydney Morning Herald. In the interview, he said Hawke's quote "must have been taken out of context. I find it puzzling." However, Weir confirmed his retirement, saying that "for film directors, like volcanoes, there are three major stages: active, dormant and extinct. I think I've reached the latter! Another generation is out there calling 'action' and 'cut' and good luck to them." He stated that he has enjoyed visiting ancient ruins and battlefields and diving on the WWII shipwrecks of the Truk Lagoon during his retirement.

In September 2024, Weir received the Golden Lion for Lifetime Achievement at the 81st Venice International Film Festival.

== Personal life ==
On 14 June 1982, Weir was appointed a Member of the Order of Australia (AM) for his service to the film industry.

== Filmography ==
Directed features
Year	Title	Distributor
1971	Homesdale	
1974	The Cars That Ate Paris	British Empire Films
1975	Picnic at Hanging Rock	British Empire Films
1977	The Last Wave	United Artists
1979	The Plumber	
1981	Gallipoli	Village Roadshow / Paramount Pictures
1982	The Year of Living Dangerously	United International Pictures / MGM/UA Entertainment Company
1985	Witness	Paramount Pictures
1986	The Mosquito Coast	Warner Bros.
1989	Dead Poets Society	Buena Vista Pictures
1990	Green Card	Buena Vista Pictures
1993	Fearless	Warner Bros.
1998	The Truman Show	Paramount Pictures
2003	Master and Commander: The Far Side of the World	20th Century Fox
2010	The Way Back	Newmarket Films / Exclusive Film Distribution / Meteor Pictures

== Awards and nominations ==
Year	Title	Academy Awards		BAFTA Awards		Golden Globe Awards	
Year	Title	Nominations	Wins	Nominations	Wins	Nominations	Wins
1975	Picnic at Hanging Rock			3	1		
1981	Gallipoli					1	
1982	The Year of Living Dangerously	1	1			1	
1985	Witness	8	2	7	1	6	
1986	The Mosquito Coast					2	
1989	Dead Poets Society	4	1	6	2	4	
1990	Green Card	1		1		3	2
1993	Fearless	1				1	
1998	The Truman Show	3		7	3	6	3
2003	Master and Commander: The Far Side of the World	10	2	8	4	3	
2010	The Way Back	1					
Total		29	6	32	11	27	5

Directed Academy Award Performances

Year	Performer	Film	Result
Academy Award for Best Actor
1985	Harrison Ford	Witness	Nominated
1989	Robin Williams	Dead Poets Society	Nominated
Academy Award for Best Supporting Actor
1998	Ed Harris	The Truman Show	Nominated
Academy Award for Best Supporting Actress
1982	Linda Hunt	The Year of Living Dangerously	Won
1993	Rosie Perez	Fearless	Nominated

Awards and achievements
Preceded by Baz Luhrmann for Romeo + Juliet	BAFTA Award for Best Direction; 1998 for The Truman Show	Succeeded by Pedro Almodóvar for All About My Mother
Preceded by Roman Polanski for The Pianist	BAFTA Award for Best Direction; 2003 for Master and Commander: The Far Side of the World	Succeeded by Mike Leigh for Vera Drake
