= Alcoholic Beverage Control =

Alcoholic Beverage Control or Alcoholic Beverage Commission (ABC), or variants thereof, typically refer to a U.S. state's regulatory control over the wholesaling or retailing of some or all categories of alcoholic beverages. In alcoholic beverage control states, the state has a monopoly over some or all such sales. Examples of state agencies that oversee such arrangements include:

Listed alphabetically by state or territory

- Alabama Alcoholic Beverage Control Board
- Arkansas Alcoholic Beverage Control Division
- California Department of Alcoholic Beverage Control
  - California Alcoholic Beverage Control Appeals Board
- Alcoholic Beverage and Cannabis Administration (District of Columbia)
- Idaho Alcoholic Beverage Control
- Iowa Alcoholic Beverages Division
- Kansas Division of Alcoholic Beverage Control
- Kentucky Office of Alcoholic Beverage Control
- Massachusetts Alcoholic Beverage Control Commission
- Michigan Liquor Control Commission
- Mississippi Office of Alcoholic Beverage Control
- New Hampshire Liquor Commission
- New Jersey Division of Alcoholic Beverage Control
- North Carolina Alcoholic Beverage Control Commission
- Oregon Liquor and Cannabis Commission
- Tennessee Alcoholic Beverage Commission
- Texas Alcoholic Beverage Commission
- Utah Department of Alcoholic Beverage Services
- Virginia Alcoholic Beverage Control Board
  - Virginia Alcoholic Beverage Control Authority
- West Virginia Alcohol Beverage Control Administration

== See also ==
- List of alcohol laws of the United States
