= 1975 in Australia =

- Monarch: Elizabeth II
- Governor-General: Sir John Kerr
- Prime minister: Gough Whitlam, then Malcolm Fraser
- Population: 13,722,571
- Australian of the Year: John Cornforth and Alan Stretton
- Elections: SA, Federal

The following lists events that happened during 1975 in Australia.

- Decades: 1950s; 1960s; 1970s; 1980s; 1990s
- See also: 1975 in Australian television; 1975 in Australian literature; Other events of 1975; Federal election; Timeline of Australian history

== Incumbents ==
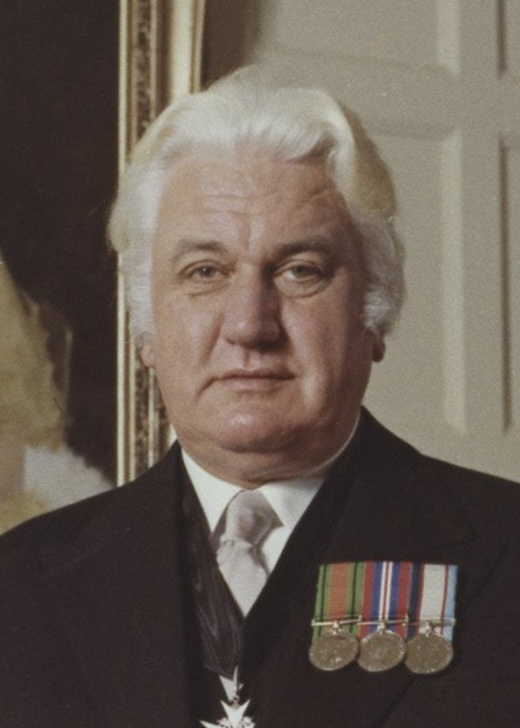
Sir John Kerr

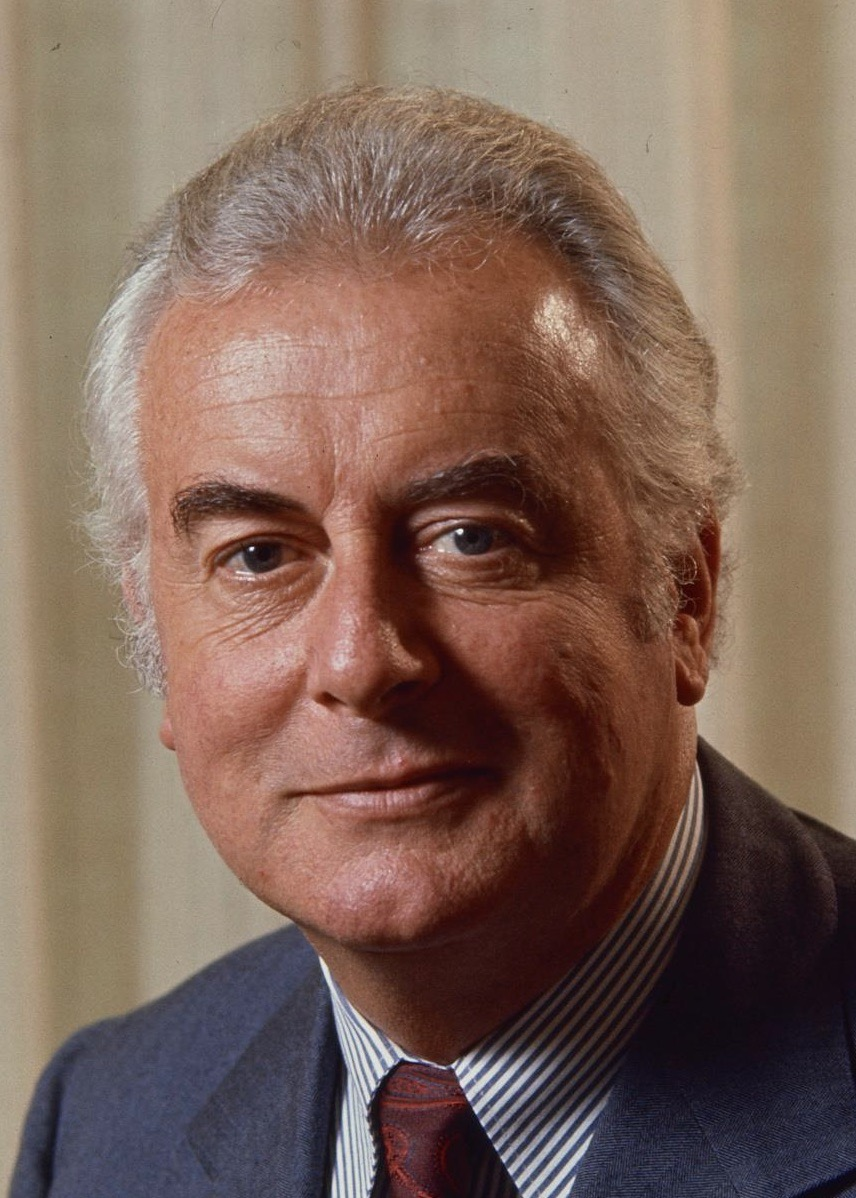
Gough Whitlam

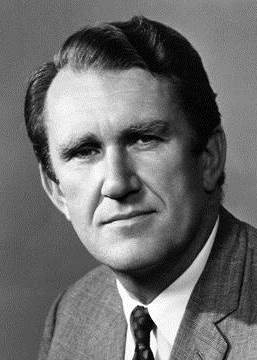
Malcolm Fraser

- Monarch – Elizabeth II
- Governor-General – Sir John Kerr
- Prime Minister – Gough Whitlam (until 11 November), then Malcolm Fraser
  - Deputy Prime Minister – Jim Cairns (until 2 July), then Frank Crean (until 11 November), then Doug Anthony
  - Opposition Leader – Billy Snedden (until 21 March), then Malcolm Fraser (until 11 November), then Gough Whitlam
- Chief Justice – Sir Garfield Barwick

=== State and territory leaders ===
- Premier of New South Wales – Sir Robert Askin (until 3 January), then Tom Lewis
  - Opposition Leader – Neville Wran
- Premier of Queensland – Joh Bjelke-Petersen
  - Opposition Leader – Tom Burns
- Premier of South Australia – Don Dunstan
  - Opposition Leader – Bruce Eastick (until 24 July), then David Tonkin
- Premier of Tasmania – Eric Reece (until 31 March), then Bill Neilson
  - Opposition Leader – Max Bingham
- Premier of Victoria – Rupert Hamer
  - Opposition Leader – Clyde Holding
- Premier of Western Australia – Sir Charles Court
  - Opposition Leader – John Tonkin
- Majority Leader of the Northern Territory – Goff Letts

=== Governors and administrators ===
- Governor of New South Wales – Sir Roden Cutler
- Governor of Queensland – Sir Colin Hannah
- Governor of South Australia – Sir Mark Oliphant
- Governor of Tasmania – Sir Stanley Burbury
- Governor of Victoria – Sir Henry Winneke
- Governor of Western Australia – Sir Hughie Edwards (until 2 April), then Sir Wallace Kyle (from 24 November)
- Administrator of Norfolk Island – Edward Pickerd (until 31 August), then Charles Buffett
- Administrator of the Northern Territory – Jock Nelson (until 12 November)
- High Commissioner of Papua New Guinea – Tom Critchley (until 16 September)

== Events ==
=== January ===
- 1–31 January – Bushfires burn in various parts of New South Wales and Victoria.
- 1 January –
  - In the aftermath of Cyclone Tracy, Northern Territory administrator Jock Nelson criticises Major General Alan Stretton's plan to recommend that emergency directors be given absolute authority in areas affected by disasters. Nelsen is supported by NT police commissioner William McLaren and Darwin mayor Harold Brennan.
  - Davis Hughes, Kenneth McCaw, William Tyree, Oliver Gillard, William Shearer, William Philip, Thomas Webb, Theodor Bray, James Foots, Douglas Tooth and John Parker are awarded the title of knight bachelor in the 1975 New Year Honours.
- 2 January – As Darwin begins to be rebuilt following Cyclone Tracy, Anglican bishop Ian Shevill writes an opinion piece for The Sydney Morning Herald in which he questions the viability of rebuilding the city in an area that is likely to experience future natural disasters.
- 3 January – New South Wales premier Sir Robert Askin retires from politics and is succeeded by Tom Lewis.
- 5 January – The Tasman Bridge disaster occurs in Hobart when the Tasman Bridge is struck by the ore carrier MV Lake Illawarra. The bridge partially collapses onto the vessel, which sinks. Seven crew and five motorists are killed.
- 6 January – Prime Minister Gough Whitlam meets with his French counterpart Jacques Chirac in Paris, but confirms Australia would offer no apologies for its opposition to the 1971–74 French nuclear tests in the Pacific.
- 7 January – An Executive Council Minute authorising the raising of a "temporary loan" of US$4,000 million for 20 years is reversed before it becomes public knowledge. The move to bypass the Loans Council – to become known as the "Loans Affair" – had been initiated a month earlier by several labor ministers without consulting cabinet.
- 8–29 January – New South Wales experiences a three-week period of unreliable electricity supply after "militant" unionists impose bans on Electricity Commission employees maintaining power stations across the state during an ongoing pay dispute. The New South Wales government are forced to implement measures such as industrial zoning, a three-day week and a ban on electricity for non-essential industry in Sydney. The crisis is finally resolved at a stopwork meeting held at the Gosford Showground on 29 January.
- 13 January – Music conductor Sir Bernard Heinze is announced as 1974's Australian of the Year.
- 14 January – A major fire occurs in the Sydney CBD. For over five hours, fire brigades battle to control the blaze at Cost Less Imports in the four-storey Angus & Robertson building at 89 Castleagh Street. Thousands of people are evacuated and nearby shops are closed as the fire engulfs the building. Approximately 20 fire fighters are treated by ambulance officers after being overcome by smoke.
- 19 January – Sydney's 2JJ, the ABC's new youth station and the predecessor of Triple J, commences broadcasting.
- 20 January – A four-year-old boy is killed when he is hit by a motorcycle after a member of the Astro Daredevil team performs a stunt in the grounds of a hotel on the Gold Coast. The rider is ultimately acquitted of a charge of unlawfully killing the boy when a criminal court jury is directed in September 1976 to find him not guilty due to insufficient evidence.
- 26 January – The Workers Party is launched at a banquet at the Sydney Opera House where Lang Hancock is the guest of honour. The party is libertarian in principle, demanding less government intervention, as well as being virulently anti-Socialist. The name is subsequently changed to the Progress Party in 1977.

=== February ===
- 1 February – Having commenced broadcasting in December 1974, Australia's first FM radio station 2MBS is officially launched in Sydney by prime minister Gough Whitlam and premier Tom Lewis.
- 3 February –
  - Two RAAF jets on a training flight off the New South Wales North Coast receive a distress signal, which lead them to two sailors stranded in a liferaft who had survived the sinking of their eight-metre sloop the night before. The sailors are eventually retrieved by a 15,000-tonne tanker that was located approximately 20 kilometres away.
  - Eleven 12-year-old students and their 22-year-old teacher were injured when a gas line explodes in a science laboratory at Busby High School in the Sydney suburb of Green Valley.
- 7 February –
  - An 11-year-old boy dies after being attacked by a shark at Point Sinclair in South Australia.
  - During a statewide 24-hour strike by the Queensland Municipal Officers Association, Toowoomba City Council mayor Nell Robinson famously sits at a small table in the foyer of City Hall and handles all administrative duties, including the collection of fines and rates.
- 8 February – Off duty police officers are stationed at the home of Lang Hancock in the Perth suburb of Dalkeith with strict security checks being performed as he holds a 21st birthday party for his daughter Gina.
- 9 February – Lionel Murphy resigns to become a High Court judge (a move for which Garfield Barwick's appointment had set a precedent).
- 11 February – New South Wales Premier Tom Lewis decides to replace Lionel Murphy in the Senate with a non-Labor nominee. Cabinet unanimously endorses his decision with Albury's 77-year-old mayor, Cleaver Bunton selected, thus reducing Labor to 28 in the Senate. The move is seen as breaking constitutional convention and was against the advice of senior Liberals and most Premiers.
- 13 February – The federal minister for the Northern Territory Rex Patterson announces that the Darwin Relief Fund has approved immediate payments of $10,000 for the widows of Cyclone Tracy, while each child under 16 will receive $1000. Payments of $5,000 had also been approved to families where the wife had been killed in the cyclone and an additional $2,500 approved for each child killed.
- 24 February – On the final day of the three-day state Labor conference in Launceston, Tasmanian premier Eric Reece announces his resignation. The announcement came after a vote in which Labor ruled that people aged 65 or over could not be endorsed as an ALP candidate at the next state election, likely voiding Reece's eligibility. However, four hours later Reece announces he has changed his mind after delegates unanimously passed a vote of confidence in Reece and ask him to stay until the end of his term.
- 27 February – Prime Minister Gough Whitlam's failure to support Speaker Jim Cope in a ruling involving Clyde Cameron led to the Speaker's resignation and his replacement by Gordon Scholes. Cope had been having difficulty with the Opposition's increasing larrikinism.

=== March ===
- 12 March – Chargé d'affaires Graeme Lewis is killed when the Air Vietnam Douglas C-54 he was a passenger on crashed during a flight between Vientiane and Saigon, killing all on board.
- 13 March – Four American businessmen and their Australian pilot are killed instantly when the Cessna 310 they were onboard crashed on Fitzroy Station in the Northern Territory, between Katherine and Kununurra. All four businessmen were representatives of subsidiaries of the Standard Oil Company.
- 14 March – ABC Radio producer Peter Whitlock who had been working in Thailand becomes trapped in the South Vietnamese city of Buôn Ma Thuột when it comes under heavy attack from communist forces.
- 16 March – A young child is stabbed twice in the back by a man as she played in a park in the Sydney suburb of Newtown. She is taken to Royal Prince Alfred Hospital in a stable condition.
- 18 March –
  - The Victorian Government appoints the Beach Board of Inquiry to report on allegations of misconduct against the police force.
  - Tasmanian premier Eric Reece again announces his resignation. The announcement comes after Reece initially announced his resignation at the state Labor conference in Launceston in February before changing his mind four hours later. Reece now confirms he will leave the role at the end of March to be succeeded by Bill Neilson.
  - It's reported 47 women are to lose their jobs at Thomas Nationwide Transport as the company plans to outsource its computer work to Singapore. Chairman of TNT Sir Peter Abeles defends the move and claims the company had attempted to find new jobs for the women but none of them had accepted any new positions.
  - The Department of Foreign Affairs asks the ambassador of Australia to North Vietnam David Wilson to make official enquires about missing ABC Radio producer Peter Whitlock who is believed to be under house arrest in Buôn Ma Thuột in South Vietnam, which was overrun by Viet Cong troops earlier in the month.
  - Federal transport minister Charles Jones confirms Concorde will be allowed into Australia for at least three proving flights in either July or August.
- 19 March – 20-year-old bank teller William Rice is shot dead during an armed robbery at an ANZ Bank branch in the Sydney suburb of Bondi. In April 1977, Gary Findlay pleads guilty to murdering Rice and to also having wounded 72-year-old Thomas Edward Douglas Watson with intent to murder two days earlier. Findlay is sentenced to two terms of life imprisonment. Findlay was on parole when the offences were committed, having been sentenced in 1970 to 10 years in jail on each of three counts of armed robbery but was released on parole in November 1973.
- 20 March –
  - Deputy prime minister Jim Cairns, Minister for Agriculture Ken Wriedt and Iranian government ministers jointly announce that Australia and Iran had negotiated to strengthen economic ties, with Australia agreeing to sell uranium to Iran "under favourable conditions" while Iran agrees to joint ventures in mining and agriculture
  - Charmain Brent confirms she is filing for divorce from her husband Ronald Biggs. Brent has remained in Australia with their two sons while Biggs is now living in Brazil with his girlfriend and their seven-month-old son.
- 21 March – The 1975 Liberal Party of Australia leadership spill occurs which sees Malcolm Fraser replace Billy Snedden as the leader of the Liberal Party, winning the party room ballot 37:27. Phillip Lynch retains the deputy leadership.
- 22 March – Husband and wife Noel and Sophia Weckert are both murdered between Mackay and Rockhampton while travelling Queensland's Bruce Highway en route from Townsville to Emu Park. In March 1976, Raymond John Wylie is found guilty of Noel Weckert's murder and sentenced to life imprisonment while Maxwell John Harper and Janice Christine Anne Payne are found guilty of manslaughter and sentenced to seven years hard labour. In February 1977, Wylie and Harper are both found guilty of Sophia Weckert's murder and sentenced to life imprisonment while Payne is sentenced to 10 years jail for manslaughter.
- 26 March – 47-year-old Reginald Edward Issacs is found guilty of abducting, sexually assaulting and murdering 9-year-old Gregory Paul Cowie in the Wombat State Forest on 13 September 1974. Justice Gowans sentences pronounces the statuary death sentence.
- 30 March – Two men, aged 21 and 18, are killed when they are struck by lightning on a property near Ilford, New South Wales during a rabbit shooting trip. A 17-year-old boy was seriously injured in the strike and was taken to hospital in Mudgee.

=== April ===
- 3 April – Prime minister Gough Whitlam launches a public appeal for the Australian Council for Overseas Aid to help raise money for refugees from Vietnam and Indo-China, confirming the Australian Government would commit $50,000 to the cause. The Federal Government also confirms around 500 orphans from Vietnam would soon arrive in Australia. A total of 226 families have already having been approved to adopt the orphans, with 270 adoptions applications in progress.
- 8 April – After 21 hours of bitter debate in the Victorian Legislative Assembly, a Bill to abolish the death penalty is passed 36:30, with 5 abstentions. To this end, Labor Council leader John Galbally had brought in 21 private members Bills in some 15 years. The abolition Bill must now pass the Legislative Council where lengthy debate and an even closer vote is expected.
- 11 April – Approximately 10,000 Water and Sewerage Employees Union members employed by the Sydney Water Board stop work and commence an indefinite strike as they demand a new industrial award conditions including a wage increase, permanency for employees after one year of service, free time for migrants to learn English and free work clothes after three months service. Due to the strike, untreated sewage is permitted to flow into the sea from pumping stations at Cronulla, Malabar, Bondi and North Head.
- 17 April – Senator Don Willesee announces the Australian Government will recognise the Royal Government of National Union of Cambodia following the Fall of Phnom Penh when Cambodian Government troops surrender to the Khmer Rouge.
- 18 April – The residents of Darwin are given clearance to commence rebuilding their homes after the city was devastated by Cyclone Tracy with chairman of the Reconstruction Commission Tony Powell confirming the draft building code submitted to the interim commission under Leslie Thiess had been adopted by the Darwin Reconstruction Commission.
- 19 April – The PRG fails to provide information about the whereabouts or the state of health of ABC Radio producer Peter Whitlock who became trapped in Buôn Ma Thuột when it fell to communist forces during the Battle of Ban Me Thuot more than a month ago. When asked about Whitlock at his weekly press conference, Colonel Vo Dong Giang stated: "I am not aware of the concrete factors, that is why I regret I cannot answer you in a concrete way."
- 23 April –
  - The Victorian Legislative Council votes to abolish the Death penalty in a 20–13 vote. All 9 labor members in the legislative council, 11 liberal members voted in favor. 7 liberals and all 6 Country voted against.
  - Princess Anne and Captain Mark Phillips arrive in Australia to commence a two-week royal tour of the country, beginning in Sydney and then continuing in South Australia, the Northern Territory and Western Australia.
  - Prime minister Gough Whitlam and his wife Margaret leave Australia on a chartered Qantas Boeing 707 for an 18-day overseas trip which will include scheduled meetings with leaders in Peru, attending the 1975 Commonwealth Heads of Government Meeting in Kingston, Jamaica and meeting with United States president Gerald Ford in Washington, D.C.
- 24 April – Minister for Overseas Trade Frank Crean and Minister for Agriculture Senator Ken Wriedt announce that the Japanese Government has advised Australia that in June, Japan will re-open imports of Australian beef and veal which have been banned since an embargo took effect in early 1974.
- 25 April –
  - The 60th anniversary of the Landing at Anzac Cove is commemorated at Anzac Day services around Australia.
  - The Australian Embassy in South Vietnam is closed and staff evacuated prior to the Fall of Saigon.

=== May ===
- 1 May – Following an 11-day trial, 41-year-old Alwyn Theodore Kleinig is sentenced in the Central Criminal Court to life imprisonment for the murder of Francis David Pye who died when the main homestead on Pye's property was destroyed by fire at Collie near Gilgandra, New South Wales on 18 April 1973.
- 2 May –
  - James Ryan O'Neill is charged in Tasmania's Bellerive Court with murdering 9-year-old Ricky John Smith in February 1975 and then murdering 9-year-old Bruce Colin Wilson in April 1975. O'Neill pleads not guilty to murdering the boys. However, at a trial in November 1975, O'Neill is tried and convicted of Smith's murder and sentenced to life imprisonment. Despite being charged with Wilson's murder which he purportedly confessed to in a police interview, he was not tried due to a prosecution policy in Tasmania stipulating that persons charged with multiple murders could only be tried on one of the charges.
  - Qantas announces it has doubled the size of no smoking areas on its aircraft, so that one-third of all seats will be designated no-smoking zones.
- 4 May – Several people are injured during a violent clash between pro-Palestinian supporters and pro-Israel supporters outside the Australian Union of Students headquarters in Melbourne.
- 5 May – After the local council struggles to find an effective way to remove thousands of starlings which are roosting in the city of Wagga Wagga, a group of men consisting of local police officers and gun club members commence several days of an RSPCA-approved mass shooting of the birds. Approximately 150 birds are killed on the first day of shooting, while around another 600 are killed during the second day.
- 8 May – New South Wales police minister John Waddy announces a new scheme in which police officers at school crossings are replaced by dedicated lollypop men and women had been approved following a successful three-month trial. Approximately 70 police officer are to re-deployed to other duties while Waddy says he expects the crossing supervisors to mainly consist of pensioners and housewives. The lollypop men and women will be paid $30 each week.
- 9 May – All 17 crew members are rescued from the cargo ship "Tropic Queen" after it sinks north-west of Port Hedland, Western Australia.
- 10 May – A three-year-old girl is raped and murdered in her own bedroom the Brisbane suburb of Cribb Island. 30-year-old Robert Douglas Skilton is convicted of her murder and sentenced on 3 October 1975 to life imprisonment. In 1988, he was assessed as not being suitable for parole. He died of natural causes at the Wolston Correctional Centre on 28 April 2018.
- 12 May –
  - After a protracted period of industrial action and negotiations lasting 32 days, a meeting is held involving all parties concerned where striking Sydney Water Board employees vote overwhelmingly to end their 32-day strike.
  - Melbourne's new ABC public access radio station 3ZZ goes to air for the first time.
- 13 May –
  - The Federal Opposition attempts to censure prime minister Gough Whitlam for allegedly misleading parliament for comments he made in a statement on 9 April. The censure motion is defeated in the House of Representatives 69–63. In the senate, a censure motion against Foreign Affairs minister Senator Don Willesee was defeated after the vote was tied 28-all, with Liberal Movement leader Steele Hall and independent senator Cleaver Bunton voting with the government.
  - A 61-year-old train driver and a 38-year-old railways inspector are killed when the Northern Tablelands Express collides with a semi-trailer carrying 290 sheep on a level crossing near Gunnedah, New South Wales. Four passengers aboard the train also suffer minor injuries but the 34-year-old truck driver and his two young children were unhurt. Around 50 sheep were also killed.
- 15 May –
  - Ray McPharlin announces the Country Party of Western Australia has withdrawn from the coalition government it had formed with Western Australian Liberal Party due a series of policy differences on rural issues, forcing premier Charles Court to govern with a minority government.
  - A 49-year-old Sydney former newsagent is convicted by a jury on six charges of selling obscene and indecent publications. He had pleaded not guilty to selling copies of Bitch and Venus to two vice squad detectives on 29 March 1974. He is fined a total of $500.
- 18 May – Following the Country Party of Western Australia's split from the coalition government, the leader and deputy leader of the party Ray McPharlin and Matt Stephens both resign and are succeeded by Dick Old and Peter Jones respectively.
- 19 May – Despite being transported to Hobart from Sydney, it's confirmed that the 62-year-old ferry Lady Ferguson will need to be scrapped after being found to have a rotten timber hull. Parts from Lady Ferguson will be salvaged and used in another former Sydney ferry, Kosciusko.
- 20 May – The loans affair continues with the Executive Council revoking the approval it had given on 28 January for a US$2,000 million overseas loan. Henceforth, all negotiations are to be conducted through the Treasury.
- 29 May – A taxi driver who refused to carry a cigarette smoking passenger faces a Brisbane magistrate charged with a summons complaint of breaching a section of Queensland Transport's regulations in his refusal to carry the passenger. After pleading not guilty, and evidence presented by health experts, the magistrate dismisses the charge, and orders the complainant to pay $150 in costs.
- 30 May – Western Australian premier Charles Court announces that the Country Party has reformed the coalition government with the Western Australian Liberal Party.

=== June ===
- 2 June – After a six-day trial, 37-year-old Bowral labourer Kenneth William Johnston is found guilty by a jury and sentenced to life imprisonment for the murder of 13-year-old Bowral High School student Michelle Tracy Allport at Mittagong on 1 November 1974. Despite being eligible for parole from November 1993, the State Parole Authority declines to release Johnston to parole and he remains in the Long Bay Correctional Centre until his death at the age of 79 on 29 October 2017.
- 5 June – Lance Barnard's resignation to become Ambassador to Sweden leads to a reorganisation of the Federal Ministry. Social Security Minister Bill Hayden (Ipswich) replaces Jim Cairns as Treasurer, and Cameron is demoted from the Labour and Immigration Ministry to Science and Consumer Affairs (amid his own and union protests).
- 9 June – Sydney's first ethnic radio station 2EA goes to air for the first time, with the station's transmissions commencing with an address by Al Grassby who speaks in Greek.
- 11 June – Australian officials confirm Tamworth medical practitioner Dr Douglas Hill, who was in Ethiopia working as a doctor for the Society of International Missionaries to help famine victims was stabbed to death by a tribesman on 4 June.
- 15 June – The South Australian Australian Labor Party conference gives Prime Minister Gough Whitlam a mixed reception. The Australian Workers' Union, in particular, is offended by his recent demotion of Clyde Cameron, for decades a leading figure in South Australia's Labor and Industrial Affairs.
- 20 June – A 38-year-old shearing contractor who had been arrested on a charge of drunkenness is burnt to death in a fire in a police cell in Charleville, Queensland. The police officer on night duty attempts to rescue the man but is forced back by the flames. Four other prisoners in adjoining cells are rescued.
- 27 June – Former Balmain Tigers rugby league player Kevin Yow Yeh dies in a police cell in Mackay, Queensland.
- 28 June –
  - 12-year-old Terry Floyd disappears and is believed to have been abducted as he hitchhiked on Victoria's Pyrenees Highway between Maryborough and Avoca after playing in a local football match.
  - The 1975 Bass by-election is held. Malcolm Fraser and Gough Whitlam campaign against each other for the first time as leaders. A swing of about 16% against the Australian Labor Party gives the seat to the Liberal candidate Kevin Newman, and the Opposition sees this as the green light for its strategy of forcing a second premature election.
- 30 June – Queensland Senator Bert Milliner dies, leaving a Senate vacancy. The filling of this vacancy and the controversy surrounding it becomes one of the key events of the 1975 Australian constitutional crisis.

=== July ===
- 1 July –
  - 19-year-old American woman Julie Garciacelay, living in Australia and employed as a library assistant at Southdown Press, disappears in Melbourne. As of 2024, the case remains unsolved with Victoria Police reopening the case in 2003.
  - Medibank is introduced, Australia Post and Telecom are formed from the Postmaster-General's Department.
- 2 July –
  - Prime Minister Gough Whitlam has Jim Cairns' commission as Environment Minister terminated for misleading Parliament. Cairns had denied having written a secret letter to a loans broker in March, but a signed letter was produced in June.
  - Approximately 100 University of Sydney students break into the office of vice-chancellor Bruce Williams to participate in a three-hour occupation, during which time they drank his alcoholic beverages and wore his academic robes.
- 3 July – A school bus carrying 39 children collides with a cement truck in the Melbourne suburb of Thornbuy, near Thornbury High School.
- 4 July – Sydney newspaper publisher Juanita Nielsen disappears from her Kings Cross home where she published attacks on inner-city development. Edward Trigg and Shayne Martin-Simmonds are later found guilty of conspiring to abduct her. In 2021, New South Police announce a $1 million reward for anyone who provides information relating to Neilsen's suspected murder.
- 6 July –
  - Two men are killed and 14 others injured when a tour bus crashed down the side of Alpine Way at Dead Horse Gap near Thredbo. The bus was chartered for a 14-day trip to the Snowy Mountains. Two 19-year-old nurses who were on the bus are credited with raising the alarm and tending to the injured, with one running four kilometres to the Thredbo Chalet to seek help.
  - Senator Michael Townley is uninjured when the aircraft he was piloting crashed after it failed to take off at Grovedale, Victoria. His two passengers are also uninjured.
- 7 July – Historical documents from 1881 and a collection of coins minted in 1881 are discovered by Sydney City Council workers upon removing the foundation block of the Queen Victoria statue in Queen's Square. The artefacts were placed under the statue when Prince Edward (later King Edward VII) laid the foundation stone at its original location at Hyde Park, Sydney on 2 August 1881. The statue moved to Queen's Square in 1908, when additional documents were added to the original 1881 items.
- 12 July – The 1975 South Australian state election is held, which is narrowly won by the incumbent Labor Party government led by premier Don Dunstan narrowly defeating the Liberal Party led by opposition leader Bruce Eastick.
- 23 July – Staff at the ABC's 2JJ intentionally take the station off the air for two hours due to a stop work meeting with staff protesting over the Australian Broadcasting Control Board's allocation of a relatively weak transmission for the station, with listeners in large areas of Sydney receiving poor reception.
- 25 July – Following the party's defeat at the state election, David Tonkin successfully contests the leadership of the South Australian Liberal Party, defeating Bruce Eastick.
- 26 July – A car bomb explodes outside Football Park in the Adelaide suburb of West Lakes, killing 43-year-old Billy Shuttleworth. 31-year-old Roger Michael O'Sullivan and 25-year-old George Valentine Mackie are both charged with Shuttleworth's murder. They are both sentenced on 31 October 1975 to death after a Supreme Court jury find them both guilty of having murdered Shuttleworth. The sentences were commuted to life imprisonment under government policy at the time. Both men unsuccessfully appealed their convictions.
- 28 July – It's confirmed Australian political advisor Eric Joseph Wright, a mentor to Papuan separatist Josephine Abaijah has been ordered to leave Papua New Guinea by foreign relations minister Albert Maori Kiki.
- 29 July –
  - After a two-hour hearing, the South Australian Parole Board grants convicted murderer Rupert Max Stuart parole. Stuart was sentenced to be hanged in 1959 for the murder of 9 year-old Mary Olive Hattam at Thevenard on 21 December 1958 but the sentence was commuted to life imprisonment following the Royal Commission in regard to Rupert Max Stuart.
  - During a television interview, president of the ACTU and the ALP, Bob Hawke pledges to give up drinking if he is successful in entering Federal Parliament and becomes the leader of the Australian Labor Party.
  - A Sydney restaurant proprietor was fined $20 after being charged under the Dog Act for refusing to permit a man onto his premises while accompanied by a guide dog on 28 April 1975. The restaurant proprietor, who failed to appear in court, was also ordered to pay $80 in professional fees and $20 for witness expenses as well as $6 in court costs.

=== August ===
- 1 August –
  - The body of missing 18-year-old Brisbane woman Catherine Pamela Graham is found beside the Flinders Highway at Oak Valley 24 kilometres south of Townsville. As of 2025, Graham's murder remains unsolved with police reopening the case in 2009 and offering a $250,000 reward in 2019 for information.
  - Minister for Northern Australia Rex Patterson says he feels complaints about the behaviour of those aboard the Patris were exaggerated after an impromptu meeting with some of the ship's residents. The ship is anchored in Darwin Harbour and being used for emergency accommodation following Cyclone Tracy. Some of those on board wrote to senior politicians and complained of drunkenness, attempted suicides, filthy conditions, offensive behaviour, violence and blocked plumbing. Despite Patterson's comments, an investigation into conditions aboard is ordered.
- 2 August – The ALP national executive votes to expel Tasmanian Trades & Labor Council secretary Brian Harradine from the Australian Labor Party.
- 3 August - Federal minister for transport Charles Jones announces that Qantas chairman Sir Donald Anderson is retiring due to ill health, but would remain on the Qantas board as a part-time director. Vice-chairman of Qantas Robert Law-Smith is appointed acting chairman.
- 4 August –
  - Three years after a prototype aircraft visited Australia, a $46 million Concorde aircraft piloted by Brian Trubshaw arrives at Melbourne Airport for a week-long schedule of endurance flights between Singapore and Australia. The Concorde's arrival coincides with the release of a 56-page draft document examining the environmental impact of its Australian operations. Vice-chairman of British Aircraft Corporation's commercial aircraft division Sir Geoffrey Tuttle also provides assurances that there would be no attempt to sell the Concorde to Qantas.
  - A pilot and his two passengers are killed when the five-seater twin-engine Cessna they were aboard crashes just after takeoff at Karratha Airport.
  - An Australian woman and her three children are taken hostage by the Japanese Red Army in the 1975 AIA building hostage crisis in Kuala Lumpur, along with 46 others including the woman's American husband.
- 8 August – A 25-member surgical team led by paediatric surgeon Peter Jones commence a three-hour operation to separate conjoined twins Yew Sun Foo and Yew Tsar Foo at Melbourne's Royal Children's Hospital. The operation concludes in the early hours of 9 August and is a success. The condition of the twins gradually improves and they are discharged from hospital on 9 September 1975.
- 11 August –
  - An English deckhand is sentenced to six year's jail for raping a 28-year-old Queensland woman on the P&O ocean liner Oronsay on 14 March 1975 while it was berthed in Pyrmont.
  - Lord Mayor of Sydney, Nicholas Shehadie announces he will not be standing for re-election. A new mayor will be formally elected at a special council meeting on 26 September 1975 but Shehadie says he will see out the remainder of his term as alderman which expires in two years.
- 13 August – The Anglican Commission of Inquiry into the Ocult recommends the Trade Practices Act be invoked to prevent the sale of ouija boards and tarot cards at toy shops and newsagencies.
- 25 August – Six prisoners escape through the roof of a high security building at Morisset Hospital near Newcastle, New South Wales by scaling the walls using a ladder from a carpenter's truck. Police warn local residents to stay indoors while they searched the area for the prisoners, which include two convicted murderers and a convicted rapist. All prisoners are recaptured on 26 August.
- 26 August –
  - Federal minister for Defence Bill Morrison confirms in Federal Parliament that the Whitlam Government has decided to abolish the Cadets Corp at the end of the year - a decision which is widely criticised by parents, headmasters and the RSL. However, Morrison states it is an expensive scheme costing the Australian Army $9 million each year.
  - South Australian Minister for the Environment Glen Broomhill informs premier Don Dunstan he intends to resign from Cabinet in September citing personal and family reasons.
- 27 August – A 25-year-old New Zealand woman, employed as a tally clerk at Australian Iron & Steel's slab yard at Port Kembla, is crushed to death when she is pinned between two large steel slabs.
- 28 August – Attorney-General Kep Enderby announces Justice Elizabeth Evatt's appointment as the first Chief Judge of the Family Court of Australia.
- 31 August –
- Five children from two families are killed when the vehicle they were in plunges into the Molonglo River in Canberra.
- An official welcome by prime minister Gough Whitlam to 700 delegates at the Women and Politics Conference at Parliament House in Canberra is disrupted by approximately 50 Aboriginal women who chant slogans alleging racism in the "white feminist movement."

=== September ===
- 3 September –
  - Convention is breached when the Queensland Parliament rejects Australian Labor Party nominee Mal Colston to replace the deceased Senator Bert Milliner, choosing instead Pat Field (automatically expelled for having nominated against the endorsed candidate).
  - During the Women and Politics conference in Canberra, a member of the Darwin Women's Electoral Lobby alleges that police officers from southern states had raped local women during the aftermath of Cyclone Tracy. NSW police minister John Waddy rejects the allegations describing them as "a scurrilous attack on a great body of men."
- 4 September –
  - An RAAF Caribou aircraft with Red Cross insignia is hijacked in Portuguese Timor by a group of armed men who forced the crew to fly 48 refugees to Darwin.
  - Prime Minister Gough Whitlam and acting Attorney-General Jim McClelland strongly defend the appointment of Gail Wilenski, the wife of public servant Peter Wilenski, to the Public Service Board's new equal opportunities section.
- 5 September – Approximately 150 women march on the offices of The Canberra Times and occupy the editorial office of the newspaper demanding an opportunity to respond to a controversial editorial which was published on 2 September 1975. Some of the women shouted abuse at acting editor John Farquharson while standing on desks, chairs and filing cabinets.
- 6 September – A total of 46 people are injured in two separate bus crashes in New South Wales. In the first incident, nine people were injured when a bus was involved in a six-vehicle pile up on the Pacific Highway at Peats Ridge. In the second incident, a tourist bus plunged down an embankment while travelling on the Great Western Highway near Hartley with all 37 people on board sustaining injuries.
- 16 September – Papua New Guinea gains its independence from Australia. As HMAS Stalwart fires a 101-gun salute across Port Moresby Harbour, Papua New Guinea governor-general Sir John Guise makes the declaration in a radio address at 12:01am that Papua New Guinea is now an independent nation, ending 90 years of colonial rule under British, German and Australian administrations.
- 20 September – Thirteen miners are killed in an underground coal mine explosion at the Kianga coal mine near Moura, Queensland.
- 26 September – In a surprise announcement, prime minister Gough Whitlam announces he has appointed Justice Edward Woodward will be the new director-general of the Australian Security Intelligence Organisaation, replacing Peter Barbour who will become Consul-General of Australia in New York from October 1975.

=== October ===
- 1 October –
  - Senator Albert Field (now an Independent) is granted a month's leave of absence while his eligibility to take his seat is tested in the High Court of Australia, sitting as a Court of Disputed Returns. There has been doubting as to whether he resigned in the correct way from the Public Service at the time he was appointed.
  - Despite having pleaded not guilty, a 12-man jury finds 15-year-old Kevin Ernest Burgess guilty of murdering his 57-year-old grandmother, Betty Jones, at her home in the Sydney suburb of Cartwright on 28 March 1975. The boy is subsequently sentenced to 12 year's jail with a non-parole period of five years.
  - A 32-year-old army parachutist is killed when his parachute fails to deploy and plunges approximately 3,000 metres to his death near Williamtown RAAF base.
- 2 October – Elizabeth Reid resigns as prime minister Gough Whitlam's special adviser on women's affairs and as the convenor of the Australian National Advisory Committee for International Women's Year.
- 3 October –
  - A 12-year-old boy is rushed to Royal Prince Alfred Hospital after being shot in the head at Balmain High School. However, there are no suspicious circumstances.
  - A 41-year-old man is killed when he falls to his death while working on a construction site at the Newcastle Steelworks.
  - After a five-day hunger strike in Sydney's Martin Plaza, Hungarian man Ion Nicoara packs away his belongings after the Romanian consulate confirms they would support Nicoara's efforts to bring his son Stefan to Australia.
- 4 October –
  - Two 46-year-old men are killed when their boat sank off Kurnell when their 7-metre yacht is swamped and capsizes, while the sole survivor spends seven hours in the water before reaching the shore near the Kurnell Refinery.
  - Forty passengers are evacuated from an eight-carriage train at Sydney's Caringbah railway station and trains between Cronulla and Gymea diverted when a 35-year-old woman discovers what appears to be a bomb under a seat. Two soldiers and a scientific squad detective confirms there is no danger from the device which consists of six pieces of wood, cut to look like sticks of gelignite, wrapped in paper and connected to a battery and gauge mounted on a 12-inch square board.
  - Following an administrative shake-up, prime minister Gough Whitlam announces he has taken over personal responsibility for the Australian Security Intelligence Organisation, succeeding Kep Enderby.
  - Minister for Science and Consumer Affairs Clyde Cameron confirms an agreement has been reached to end the inclusion of imperial measurements in real estate advertising after 1 January 1976, following lengthy discussions between the Metric Conversion Board, newspaper groups and the real estate industry.
- 5 October –
  - Official figures are released for the month of September 1975 which indicate that for the first time since the Great Depression, unemployment figures rose to above 300,000 with over 304,000 Australians now out of work.
  - A Melbourne man is killed when the Thorp T-18 aircraft he was piloting crashed into powerlines while on his way for a fly in to celebrate the opening of a new airstrip at Bungowannah in Victoria.
- 8 October – Prime Minister Gough Whitlam denies in Parliament that any of his senior ministers were still involved in trying to raise overseas loans in defiance of the 20 May revocation. Press reports based on information from the loan intermediary, Tirath Khemlani, suggest that Rex Connor is still involved.
- 10 October – The High Court of Australia upholds the validity of the territorial Senators legislation. In any half-Senate election, four senators, plus replacements for Bunton and Field, would take their places in the Senate at once, thus giving Labor the chance to win back control there.
- 15 October – At a Brisbane Chamber of Commerce annual luncheon, Queensland Governor Sir Colin Hannah associates himself with the criticism of the Federal Government. In the ensuing row, Prime Minister Gough Whitlam persuades Queen Elizabeth II to revoke Hannah's dormant commission to act as Governor-General.
- 16 October – The Balibo Five are killed by Indonesian troops in Portuguese Timor.
- 28 October – Senator Don Willesee confirms the ABC's Peter Whitlock will be flown out of Hanoi later in the week, after receiving information from the United Nations High Commissioner for Refugees that a number of foreigners who had been detained by the North Vietnamese would be on the flight.
- 30 October – After being held captive by the Viet Cong for nearly eight months, the ABC's Peter Whitlock is freed by North Vietnam and flown to Thailand with 13 others.
- 31 October – A 39-year-old woman kills her son (aged 2) and two daughters (aged 4 and 11) and attempts to kill another son (aged 6) before killing herself in a murder-suicide in the Sydney suburb of Gymea.
- 1 to 31 October – Averaged over Victoria, this stands as the wettest month since at least 1900 with a statewide average rainfall of 154.53 millimetres or 6.08 inches.

=== November ===
- 2 November –
  - After being held captive by the Viet Cong for nearly eight months, the ABC's Peter Whitlock arrives back in Australia. Upon his arrival, he criticises some reporting that suggested he was on a spying or political mission when he was captured, stating: "I'm bitterly disappointed about it. Apart from everything else it could have harmed my professional standing with my colleagues. If anyone had the right to question my credentials, it was the North Vietnamese and they never once suggested that I was involved in anything sinister."
  - Four-year-old Peggy Clements is abducted from a car in Cobar, New South Wales prompting a widespread search. Investigating officers travel to Western Australia where they find the girl on a property near Marble Bar in January 1976. Kenneth Charles Stuart is charged and is found guilty by a jury in May 1976 of kidnapping, indecent assault and causing bodily harm. He is sentenced to a total of 14 years jail with a non-parole period of six years.
- 3 November – Lady Catherine Shaw, the 62-year-old wife of ambassador of Australia to the United States, Sir Patrick Shaw sustains a broken nose, a broken wrist and cuts when she attacked and robbed while walking near their home in Washington D.C. Following his wife's assault, Patrick Shaw condemned the judicial approach to people convicted of violent crime in the United States stating: "There seems to be very little deterrent... people who get picked up for this sort of crime get off with little more than a slap on the wrist." Secretary of State Henry Kissinger said he was "shocked" and "embarrassed" by the incident which is being investigated by the Executive Protection Service, police and the FBI.
- 11 November – The 1975 Australian constitutional crisis culminates with Governor-General Sir John Kerr dismissing the Whitlam government. Malcolm Fraser is installed as caretaker Prime Minister.
- 19 November –
  - Underworld figure Billy "The Texan" Longley is found guilty of murdering union secretary Pat Shannon on 17 October 1973 and sentenced to life imprisonment.
  - Two staff members of the Queensland Premier's department are injured when they open a letter-bomb addressed to Premier Joh Bjelke-Petersen.

=== December ===
- 6 December – The 1975 Wagga Wagga state by-election is held which is won by Joe Schipp, who succeeds Wal Fife whose resignation triggered the by-election.
- 8 December – 4ZZZ independent community radio station launches in Brisbane under its original callsign 4ZZ-FM.
- 9 December – New South Wales Country Party Leader Sir Charles Cutler retires and Deputy Leader Leon Punch replaces him with Tim Bruxner as his deputy.
- 13 December –
  - The 1975 Australian federal election is held. After a bitter campaign in which Labor tried to keep constitutional matters to the fore and the Coalition concentrated on inflation, unemployment and Labor's errors in office, the Fraser Government is confirmed in power, securing 54% of the vote, 91 of the 127 House seats, and 35 Senate seats.
  - The Victorian Government forms a committee to examine some of the recommendations from the Beach Board of Inquiry.
- 25 December – The Savoy Hotel fire occurs in which fifteen persons are killed in an arson attack at the Savoy Hotel in Kings Cross, New South Wales.

== Science and technology ==
- 17 October – John Cornforth shares the Nobel Prize for Chemistry

== Arts, entertainment and literature ==
=== January ===
- 17 January – Sam Fullbrook is announced as the winner of the 1974 Archibald Prize for his portrait of jockey Norman Stephens.
- 26 January – The third Australasian Country Music Awards are held in Tamworth. Joy McKean wins a golden guitar award for Best Australasian-recorded composition for "The Biggest Disappointment". Her husband Slim Dusty wins golden guitars for Best Australasian Country Music LP album for Australiana and for Best Male Vocal for "The Biggest Disappointment". Jean Stafford wins for Best Female Vocal for "What Kind Of Girl Do You Think I Am?" while Johnny Chester's "My Kind of Woman" is recognised with the award for Top Selling Australasian Country Music Track.

=== March ===
- 6 March – American actress Bette Davis arrives in Australia for An Informal Evening with Bette Davis which commences at the Sydney Opera House on 9 March before taking the show to Brisbane, Perth, Adelaide and Melbourne.
- 19 March –
  - American journalist and anchor of CBS Evening News, Walter Cronkite arrives in Australia as a guest of IBM to deliver lectures about developments in politics and economics, and to meet informally with prime minister Gough Whitlam.
  - Popular American family music group The Osmonds arrive in Australia for a series of concerts in Sydney, Melbourne and Brisbane.
- 20 March – The New South Wales state minister for culture, sport and recreation John Barraclough condemns the federal government for allowing rock musician Alice Cooper into Australia. Barraclough says Cooper's performances cannot be justified as "cultural" and describes the system of issuing entry permits into the country as needing an urgent overhaul.
- 24 March – Sponsored by Festival of Light Australia, American singer Pat Boone and his family arrive in Australia for a series of performances in major cities, including five performances at the Sydney Opera House, while also making special appearances at Christian rallies and open air services.

=== April ===
- 22 April – Ronald McKie is announced as the winner of the 1974 Miles Franklin Award for his novel The Mango Tree.

=== May ===
- 17 May – Internationally renowned ballet dancer Rudolf Nureyev arrives in Australia for a tour with the London Festival Ballet, for which he will produce and star in The Sleeping Beauty.

=== July ===
- 2 July – Gary Glitter arrives in Australia to attend a show by his group The Glitter Band at Sydney's Hordern Pavilion, but says he does not intend to sing himself due to a scheduled recording session in New York.
- 10 July – American comedian Bill Cosby arrives in Australia for a 10-day national tour and to host a celebrity tennis tournament for the Heart Foundation at Rushcutters Bay.
- 13 July – Lou Reed arrives in Australia for a national concert tour, which begins with a hostile press conference at Sydney Airport.
- 21 July –
  - For the third time, Sister Mary Brady wins the Portia Geach Memorial Award, having previously won the award in 1966 and 1971. This year's win is for a portrait of her friend Elizabeth Rooney.
  - American entertainer Danny Kaye arrives in Australia and prepares to conduct the Sydney Symphony Orchestra at a concert at the Sydney Opera House.
- 24 July – Despite pleading not guilty to having deposited litter in a public place, artist Ivan Durrant is fine $100 in the Melbourne City Court after dumping a dead cow on the forecourt at the National Gallery of Victoria, telling the court he had done so to enlighten people about killing. Durrant was also ordered to pay $157 in costs.

=== August ===
- 26 August – The Bay City Rollers arrive in Sydney for a promotional tour of Australia. However, the group avoided fans who had waited for them to appear at the airport by exiting through a private entrance to be driven directly to their hotel.

=== September ===
- September – Xavier Herbert's novel Poor Fellow My Country is released. In April 1976, the book is announced as the winner of the 1975 Miles Franklin Award.
- 4 September – British jazz musician Acker Bilk arrives in Australia to commence his fourth Australian tour.

=== October ===
- 3 October – Australian composer Malcolm Williamson is appointed Master of the Queen's Musick, succeeding Sir Arthur Bliss who died on 27 March 1975.
- 6 October –
  - For the first time since the second world war, a woman reads the news on ABC Radio when Margaret Throsby presents the 7pm and 10pm news bulletin on Sydney's 2BL.
  - American opera singer Anna Moffo arrives in Australia to perform in a varied program of operatic arias in Sydney between 12 October to 17 October. She holds a press conference where she discusses her controversial nude scenes in the 1969 film Una Storia d'Amore.
  - American country singer John Denver arrives in Australia for three scheduled concerts at Sydney's Hordern Pavilion but refuses to speak to waiting media.
- 10 October – After the ABC's standing committee on spoken English receives two letters from prime minister Gough Whitlam urging ABC announcers to pronounce the word kilometre as ki-lom-etre, the committee rules against Whitlam and confirms announcers should be pronouncing the word as kil-ometre. The chairman of the committee, professor of linguistics at Macquarie University Arthur Delbridge confirms kil-ometre had been favoured due to its consistency with other metric terms such as centimetre and millimetre.

=== November ===
- 21 November – Thea Astley wins The Age Book of the Year Award for her novel A Kindness Cup.

=== 1976 ===
- 23 January 1976 – John Bloomfield is announced as the winner of the 1975 Archibald Prize for his portrait of Tim Burstall. However, the validity of Bloomfield's entry is questioned with Bloomfield admitting he had never met Burstall despite the conditions of the competition specifying subjects are required to have been painted from life. The board of trustees of the Art Gallery of New South Wales ultimately rescind the 1975 Archibald Prize from John Bloomfield, determining his entry did not comply with the conditions that the portrait be painted from life. The trustees subsequently choose Kevin Connor as the 1975 Archibald Prize for his portrait of The Hon Sir Frank Kitto, KBE.

== Film ==
- 23 March – Sunday Too Far Away is awarded Best Film at the 1974-75 Australian Film Awards.
- 4 September – Petersen opens in London to positive reviews.
- October – Picnic at Hanging Rock, directed by Peter Weir, is released.

== Television ==
- 31 January – A special "Salute to Australia" edition of The Merv Griffin Show airs in the United States featuring Australian performers Helen Reddy, Peter Allen, Daphne Davis, Dita Cobb and The LeGarde Twins.
- 1 March – "Colour Day" arrives with the launch of full-time colour television broadcasting.
- 3 March – During a live Cedal hair products commercial on The Graham Kennedy Show, Kennedy interrupts to make "a sound like a crow", prompting criticism by the Broadcasting Control Board about the "general vulgarity and poor taste" of the show.
- 7 March – Ernie Sigley and Denise Drysdale from The Ernie Sigley Show both win Gold Logies at the Logie Awards of 1975 for being the most popular male and female personalities on Australian television.
- 19 March – The Broadcasting Control Board rules that Graham Kennedy be restricted to pre-recorded television appearances only, and only those that are approved by a station executive, prompting Kennedy to threaten legal action.
- 24 March – Wollongong mayor Frank Arkell demands an apology from the ABC over a comedy special entitled Wollongong the Brave which aired on ABC TV and included a sketch depicting migrants on leashes undergoing "assimilation training." Arkell claims the producers of the program displayed a "contemptuous arrogance in dealing with Wollongong."
- 17 April – After remarks in which he was critical of federal minister for the media Doug McClelland were edited out of his pre-recorded program, Graham Kennedy resigns from Channel 9.
- 2 July – The Australian Broadcasting Control Board announces that from February 1976, Australian television networks will be required to air an additional 30 hours of new Australian drama content each week under new revisions in the television points system.
- 3 October – Brisbane television journalists indicate they intend to lodge a complaint with the Australian Journalists Association regarding the conduct of prime minister Gough Whitlam's chief speech writer Graham Freudenberg during their attempts to interview Whitlam upon his visit to Brisbane to launch a book about T J Ryan, written by Denis Murphy.

== Sport ==
=== January ===
- 30 January – Western Australia wins the 1974–75 Sheffield Shield season finishing at the top of the table ahead of Queensland by five points.

=== February ===
- 2 February – A $100,000 "winner takes all" tennis match between Australia's Rod Laver and the United States' Jimmy Connors is held at Caesars Palace in Las Vegas, refereed by Pancho Gonzales. Connors wins 6-4, 6-2, 3-6, 7-5.

=== March ===
- 15 March – The Tommy Smith-trained Toy Show ridden by Kevin Langby wins the Golden Slipper Stakes at Rosehill Gardens Racecourse.
- 16 March – Australia is represented by twelve long-distance runners (eight men, four women) at the third IAAF World Cross Country Championships in Rabat, Morocco. Bill Scott is Australia's best finisher, claiming the 22nd spot (36:28.0) in the race over 12 kilometres.
- 31 March – Jean-Louis Ravelomanantsoa wins the Stawell Gift.

=== April ===
- 9 April – The British Boxing Board of Control warns Tony Mundine that he could be stripped of his Commonwealth middleweight title unless he agrees within nine days to fight Carlos Marks.
- 14 April – After a lengthy professional career which included winning the Australian Women's Amateur championship in 1957, golfer Burtta Cheney announces her retirement from the sport.

=== May ===
- 11 May – Czechoslovakia defeats Australia 3–0 in the 1975 Federation Cup held in Aix-en-Provence, France.
- 12 May – After discovering Australia's oldest living gold medalist, 77-year-old Mina Wylie could not afford to travel to the United States for her induction into the International Swimming Hall of Fame, a rushed fundraising effort is launched by New South Wales politician Neil Pickard who pledged $100 of his own money before donations from Lady Violet Braddon (widow of Sir Henry Braddon) and Sir Peter Abeles were also received. Enough money was eventually raised to enable Wylie to travel to the United States.

=== June ===
- 1 June – Australia defeat New Zealand 36-8 in the 1975 Rugby League World Cup match played at Brisbane's Lang Park.
- 10 June – A Rugby League World Cup match is played at Lang Park in Brisbane where Wales defeat England 12-7.
- 14 June – Australia defeat Wales 30-13 in the Rugby League World Cup match played at the Sydney Cricket Ground.
- 21 June - Australia defeat France 26-6 in the Rugby League World Cup match played at Brisbane's Lang Park.

=== July ===
- 4 July – Australian tennis player Evonne Cawley is defeated by Billie-Jean King 6-0, 6-1 in the women's singles at the 1975 Wimbledon Championships.
- 5 July – Upon hearing the full time siren, hundreds of children invade the Sydney Cricket Ground despite the rugby league match between Easts and Manly-Warringah not having concluded, forcing the referee, the touch judges, two police constables and the players to attempt to clear the playing area. The risk of injury to the children prompts the NSW minister for sport John Barraclough to appeal to the Sydney Cricket & Sports Ground Trust to ban children from running onto the field after matches.
- 6 July – A Bell helicopter is used to dry out the water logged playing areas at Belmore Sports Ground and Leichhardt Oval in Sydney which allowed two scheduled New South Wales Rugby League games to go ahead.
- 13 July – The Bill Cosby Pro-Celebrity Charity Tennis Event is held at White City Stadium at Rushcutters Bay to raise money for the National Heart Foundation of Australia. The event sees celebrities such as Bill Cosby, Barry Crocker, Don Lane, Bob Rogers, Mike Willesee, John Cootes, Jimmy Hannan and Tony Barber playing against professional tennis players such as Lesley Bowrey, Jan O'Neill and Mervyn Rose.

=== August ===
- 9 August – John Farrington wins his fourth men's national marathon title, clocking 2:17:20 in Point Cook.
- 19 August – The final day of the Third Test between Australia and England at Headingly is abandoned due to vandalism to the wicket overnight allegedly carried out by supporters of George Davis.
- 23 August:
  - Glenelg kick the all-time record score for a major Australian football competition, kicking 49.23 (317) to Central District's 11.13 (79). Fred Phillis kicked eighteen goals and Peter Carey eight.
  - Eastern Suburbs set a record NSWRL/ARL/NRL winning streak of their last nineteen home-and-away games before losing the major semi-final.
- 25 August – An Australian women's soccer team captained by Pat O'Connor are defeated by Thailand 3-2 in Hong Kong in a Group A match of the 1975 Asian Cup Ladies Football Tournament. The Australian team are a representative team consisting mostly of players from suburban Sydney club St George-Budapest, but were not official international players until they were controversially recognised in 2024 as the first Matildas which prompts anger and disappointment from former Matildas who describe the decision as disrespectful to the women who were formally chosen to represent Australia from 1978 onwards. The decision to elevate the 1975 team to official status also results in Tarita Yvonne Peters (who played under the name Stacey Tracy) becoming the first women's Indigenous player to represent Australia, a title which was previously held by Karen Menzies.
- 29 August – Australia defeat Singapore 3-0 in Hong Kong in their second Group A match of the 1975 Asian Cup Ladies Football Tournament.
- 31 August –
  - Western Australian jockey Raymond Oliver dies at Royal Perth Hospital from injuries sustained when five horses fell during a race at the Boulder Cup in Kalgoorlie, Western Australia. His son Damien Oliver is three years at the time of his father's death but subsequently has a successful career as a jockey which includes riding three Melbourne Cup winners.
  - Australia are defeated by New Zealand 3-2 in a knock-out semi-final of the 1975 Asian Cup Ladies Football Tournament in Hong Kong.

=== September ===
- 2 September – Australia defeat Malaysia 5-0 in the third place play-off of the 1975 Asian Cup Ladies Football Tournament in Hong Kong.
- 20 September – Minor premiers Eastern Suburbs set a record NSWRL Grand Final winning margin, beating St. George 38 points to nil. South Sydney finish in last position, claiming the wooden spoon.
- 27 September –
  - Australia defeat New Zealand 24-8 in the 1975 Rugby League World Cup match at Carlaw Park in Auckland.
  - North Melbourne become the last of the then-extant VFL clubs to win a premiership, beating Hawthorn 19.8 (122) to 9.13 (67) in the 1975 VFL Grand Final.

=== October ===
- 5 October –
  - Peter Brock and co-driver Brian Sampson win the 1975 Hardie Ferodo 1000 in their Holden Torana SL/R 5000 L34.
  - The fourth annual Spastic Centre charity match is held at Drummoyne Oval in Sydney which sees Ian Chappell's XI defeat Tony Greig's XI. Union leader Bob Hawke top scores, making 39 runs before being bowled out by Max Walker.
- 18 October – Cyril Beechey-trained Analight, a 33-1 outsider ridden by Pat Trotter, wins the Caulfield Cup at Caulfield Racecourse.
- 19 October – Australia defeats Wales 18-6 in the Rugby League World Cup match at St Helen's Rugby and Cricket Ground in Swansea, during which Ian Schubert scores a hat-trick of tries.
- 25 October – The Wally McEwan-trained Fury's Order, ridden by 17 year old apprentice jockey Brent Thomson wins the W. S. Cox Plate at Moonee Valley Racecourse in very wet conditions.
- 26 October – Australia defeat France 41-2 in the Rugby League World Cup match played at Stade Gilbert Brutus in Perpignan.

=== November ===
- 1 November – Australia are defeated by England 16-13 in the Rugby League World Cup match played at Central Park in Wigan.
- 2 November – American golfer Jack Nicklaus wins his fourth Australian Open championship with a three-stroke victory, posting a last round par of 72 for a total of 279.
- 4 November – The Bart Cummings-trained Think Big, ridden by Harry White, wins the Melbourne Cup.
- 12 November – Australia wins the 1975 Rugby League World Cup which concludes with a one-off challenge match between Australia and England at Headingley Rugby Stadium which Australia win, 25-0.

=== December ===
- 29 December – Rampage is declared the handicap winner of the Sydney to Hobart Yacht Race while Kialoa takes line honours.

== Births ==
- 2 January – Chris Cheney, singer-songwriter, guitarist and producer
- 17 January – Rob Stokes, politician and lawyer
- 19 January – Natalie Cook, beach volleyball player
- 4 February – Natalie Imbruglia, singer and actor
- 7 March – Leon Dunne, swimmer
- 13 March – Matt Sing, rugby league player
- 19 March – Matthew Richardson, footballer and sportscaster
- 19 April – Jason Gillespie, cricketer
- 13 May – Nathan Green, golfer
- 21 May – Anthony Mundine, rugby league footballer and boxer
- 27 May – Michael Hussey, cricketer
- 7 June – Leigh Colbert, footballer
- 9 June – Andrew Symonds, cricketer
- 23 June
  - Jane Jamieson, track and field athlete
  - Markus Zusak, novelist
- 2 July – Daniel Kowalski, swimmer
- 4 July – Scott Major, actor and director
- 5 July – Kip Gamblin, actor
- 7 July – Michael Voss, Australian footballer and coach
- 17 July – Loretta Harrop, triathlete
- 7 August
  - Megan Gale, model
  - David Matthew Hicks, prisoner at Guantánamo Bay, convicted of "providing material support for terrorism"
- 12 August – Taryn Woods, water polo player
- 21 August – Simon Katich, cricketer
- 25 August – Petria Thomas, swimmer
- 1 September – Natalie Bassingthwaighte, singer and actor
- 16 September – Shannon Noll, singer
- 18 September – Don Hany, actor
- 25 September – Scott Westcott, long-distance runner
- 28 September – Stuart Clark, cricketer
- 9 October – Mark Viduka, football (soccer) player
- 23 October – Phillip Gillespie, cricket umpire
- 31 October
  - Carla Boyd, basketball player
  - Jagan Hames, track and field athlete
- 18 December – SIA, Australian singer and songwriter

== Deaths ==
=== January ===
- 20 January – Bernard O'Reilly, writer (b. 1903)
- 21 January – Sir Aubrey Lewis, psychiatrist (b. 1900) (died in London)

=== February ===
- 12 February – Eric Strain, yachtsman (b. 1915)
- 14 February – Essie Ackland, singer (b. 1896)

=== March ===
- 27 March – Arthur Denning, academic (b. 1901)

=== April ===
- 10 April – Rudi Lemberg, biochemist (b. 1896)
- 12 April – Herbert Hake, cricketer and headmaster (b. 1894)
- 22 April – Sir Archie Michaelis, politician (b. 1889)
- 30 April –
  - Aubrey Abbott, politician and administrator of the Northern Territory (b. 1886)
  - Mabel Brookes, humanitarian (b. 1890)

=== May ===
- 10 May – Patrick Perry, navy officer (b. 1903)
- 25 May – Dominic McCarthy, army officer and Victoria Cross recipient

=== June ===
- 27 June – Kevin Yow Yeh, rugby league player (b. 1941)
- 30 June – Bert Milliner, Queensland politician (b. 1911)

=== July ===
- 4 July – Juanita Nielsen, urban conservationist and newspaper publisher (b. 1937)
- 5 July – Dick Ellis, intelligence officer (b. 1895) (died in England)
- 11 July – Desmonde Downing, set and costume designer (b. 1920)
- 18 July –
  - Sir Hector Clayton, politician (b. 1885)
  - Gilbert Percy Whitley, ichthyologist (b. 1903)

=== August ===
- 10 August – Neva Carr Glyn, actress (b. 1908)
- 14 August – Percy Cerutty, athletics coach (b. 1895)

=== September ===
- 27 September –
  - Leslie Beavis, army officer (b. 1895)
  - Maurice Fergusson, army officer (b. 1895)
  - Jack Lang, 23rd Premier of New South Wales (b. 1876)

=== October ===
- 2 October – Clyde Cameron, politician (b. 1897)
- 11 October – Arthur Shakespeare, newspaper journalist and editor(b. 1897)

=== November ===
- 3 November – Johnnie Wallace, rugby union player (b. 1900)
- 5 November – George Warfe, army officer (b. 1912)
- 6 November – Annette Kellerman, swimmer, actress, and author (b. 1887)
- 22 November – Sir Kevin Ellis, politician (b. 1908)
- 27 November – Joan Stevenson Abbott, World War II army hospital matron (b. 1899)
- 30 November – Sir Donald Anderson, former Qantas chairman and Department of Civil Aviation director-general (b. 1917)

=== December ===
- 27 December –
  - Sir Patrick Shaw, diplomat (b. 1913)
  - Bill Sheahan, politician (b. 1895)

== See also ==
- 1975 in Australian television
- List of Australian films of 1975
