= ABCB =

ABCB may refer to:

- Alcoholic Beverage Control Board (District of Columbia), an independent adjudicatory body of the District of Columbia
- Australian Broadcasting Control Board, an Australian government agency
- Australian Building Codes Board, an Australian government agency
- American Bottlers of Carbonated Beverages, an industry lobby organization
- Cafe ABCB, a locale in the manga/anime Kimagure Orange Road
- The ABCB rhyme scheme
