= List of Australian films of 1975 =

== 1975 ==
Title	Director	Cast	Genre	Notes
All The Old Men		Allan Penney, Ron Rodger, Marcus Cole	Short film	
Assault on Agathon	László Benedek		Adventure	IMDb
Australia After Dark	John Lamond	Narrator: Hayes Gordon, Gina Allen, Count Copernicus, Renee Lense, Eyvon Thomas, John-Michael Howson, Len Thomas, John Forrest, Kerry Norton	Erotica / Documentary Feature film	
The Box	Paul Eddy	Barrie Barkla, Fred Betts, Ken James, George Mallaby, Paul Karo, Belinda Giblin, Judy Nunn, Lois Ramsey, Robin Ramsay, Cornelia Frances, Graham Kennedy, Geraldine Turner, Tracy Mann	Comedy Feature film	IMDb
Crystal Voyager	David Elfick	George Greenough, Ritchie West, Nat Young	Sport / Documentary Feature film	IMDb
Don't Be Too Polite Girls	Martha Ansara	Mavis Rapp, Aileen Beaver, Michelle Rapp, Garry Rapp, Melbourne Women's Theatre Group	Documentay/Short film	
Double Dealer	Alan Dickes	Guy Peniston-Bird, David Callcot, Phil Avalon, Sharon Smith, Rosalind Richards, Bob Lee, Tony Fields, Michael Farcomini, Edward Leong, Frank Love, Lorna Lesley, Judy Mathews, Michele Napier	Drama TV film	
Down the Wind	Kevin McKenzie, Scott Hicks	David Cameron, Penne Hackforth-Jones, Ross Thompson, Christina Mackay, Rod Mullinar, Christine Schofield	Drama Feature film	IMDb
End Play	Tim Burstall	George Mallaby, John Waters, Ken Goodlet, Robert Hewett, Delvene Delaney, Charles Tingwell, Belinda Giblin, Adrian Wright, Kevin Miles	Mystery / Thriller Feature film	IMDb
The Firm Man	John Duigan	Peter Cummins, Eileen Chapman, Max Gillies, Don Gunner, Peter Carmody, Merle Keenan, Bruce Spence, Bethany Lee	Drama Feature film	IMDb
The Golden Cage	Ayten Kuyulu	Sayit Memisoflu, Kate Sheil, Cesar Rozerio, Ron Haddrick, Michele Fawdon, Anna Scott, David Elfick	Drama Feature film	IMDb
The Great Macarthy	David Baker	John Jarratt, Judy Morris, Kate Fitzpatrick, Sandra McGregor, Barry Humphries, John Frawley, Colin Croft, Chris Haywood, Colin Drake, Ron Fraser, Max Gillies, Dennis Miller, Lou Richards, Jack Dyer, Bruce Spence, Peter Cummins, Fred "Cul" Cullen, Maurice Fields, John Derum, David Atkins, Terry Norris, Frank Wilson	Comedy Feature film	IMDb
Homosexuality – a Film for Discussion	Barbara Creed		Documentary	IMDb
How Willingly You Sing	Gary Patterson		Drama Feature film	IMDb
Inn of the Damned	Terry Bourke	Judith Anderson, Michael Craig, Alex Cord, John Meillon, Lionel Long, Tony Bonner, Carla Hoogeveen, Phil Avalon	Horror / Thriller Feature film	IMDb
Ironbark Bill in 'The Champion Buckjumper'				IMDb
The Island				IMDb
The Lost Islands	Bill Hughes		feature film	
The Love Epidemic	Brian Trenchard Smith	Michael Laurence, Ros Speirs, Peter Reynolds, Grant Page, John Ewart, Barry Lovett, Jane Lister, Ken Doyle, Billy Thorpe	Documentary Feature film	IMDb
Made in Australia	Zbigniew (Peter) Friedrich		Feature film	
McManus M.P.B.	Cash-Harmon	Peter Sumner, Arna-Maria Winchester, Peter Gwynne, Serge Lazareff, Chantal Contouri, Alfred Sandor, Pamela Stephenson, John Benton	Drama / Mystery TV film / TV Pilot	
The Man from Hong Kong	Brian Trenchard-Smith, Jimmy Wang Yu	Jimmy Wang Yu, George Lazenby, Roger Ward, Hugh Keays-Byrne, Frank Thring, Ros Speirs, Rebecca Gilling, Bill Hunter, John Orcsik	Action	IMDb
Nuts, Bolts and Bedroom Springs	Gary Young			IMDb
The Olive Tree				IMDb
Paradise		Eric Oldfield, Tina Grenville, Michael Beecher, Ingrid Mason, Alan Wilson, Sheila Helpmann, George Haywood, Donald Dale. Peter Dair, William Evans, Leo Wockner	Drama / Thriller TV film / TV Pilot	aka Surfers Paradise Private Eye
Picnic at Hanging Rock	Peter Weir	Rachel Roberts, Dominic Guard, Helen Morse, Vivean Gray, Garry McDonald, Anne-Louise Lambert, Jacki Weaver, John Jarratt, Martin Vaughan, Kirsty Child, Margaret Nelson, Tony Llewellyn-Jones	Mystery Drama Feature film	IMDb
Plugg	Terry Bourke	Peter Thompson, Norman Yemm, Cheryl Rixon, Reg Gorman, Vynka Lee-Steere, Joseph Fürst, Edgar Metcalfe, Alan Cassell	Comedy Feature film	IMDb
Polly Me Love	Peter Maxwell	Jacki Weaver, Hugh Keays-Byrne, Scott Lambert, Max Phipps, Ted Ogden, Diana Davidson, Paula Duncan, Robert Bruning, Reg Gorman, Brian Doyle, Chris King, Jack Charles	Drama TV film	
Promised Woman	Tom Cowan	Yelena Zigon, Nikos Gerissimou, Jean-Claude Petit, Takis Emmanuel, Kate Fitzpatrick, Thea Sevastos, Gillian Armstrong	Drama Feature film	IMDb
Protected	Alessandro Cavadini		Documentary	IMDb
Pure Shit aka. Pure S...	Bert Deling	Sally McNee, Doc Smith, Gary Waddell, John Laurie, Helen Garner, Anne Heatherington, Carol Porter, Tim Robertson, Phil Motherwell, Max Gillies	Drama Feature film	IMDb
The Removalists	Tom Jeffrey	Peter Cummins, Martin Harris, John Hargreaves, Kate Fitzpatrick, Jacki Weaver, Chris Haywood	Drama Feature film	IMDb
Ride a Wild Pony	Don Chaffey	Michael Craig, John Meillon, Lorraine Bayly, Robert Bettles, Alfred Bell, Melissa Jaffer, Eva Griffith, Martin Vaughan, Peter Gwynne, Elizabeth Alexander	Family Feature film	IMDb
Scobie Malone	Terry Ohlsson	Jack Thompson, Judy Morris, James Condon, Shane Porteous, Joe Martin, Cul Cullen, Jacqueline Kott, Max Meldrum, Ken Goodlet	Thriller / Mystery Feature film	IMDb aka Murder At The Opera House
Sidecar Racers	Earl Bellamy	Ben Murphy, Wendy Hughes, John Clayton, Peter Graves, John Meillon, Serge Lazareff, Peter Gwynne, Arna-Maria Winchester, Patrick Ward	Action / Drama Feature film	IMDb
Smokes and Lollies	Gillian Armstrong			IMDb
Solo Flight	Ian Mills			IMDb
Sunday Too Far Away	Ken Hannam	Jack Thompson, Max Cullen, Robert Bruning, Peter Cummins, Ken Shorter, Sean Scully, Jerry Thomas, Reg Lye	Drama Feature film	IMDb
Symbol Boy				IMDb
That Lady from Peking				IMDb
The Tichborne Affair	Carl Schultz	Hugh Keays-Byrne, Aileen Britton, Sandra McGregor, Phillip Hinton, Kevin Miles, Brian Blain, Tony Wager, Neil Fitzpatrick, Peter Gwynne, Ken Goodlet, Tim Elliot, John Gaden, Melissa Jaffer, Les Foxcroft	Crime / Drama TV film	
The True Story of Eskimo Nell	Richard Franklin	Max Gillies, Serge Lazareff, Paul Lachon, Jerry Thomas, Kurt Beimel, Abigail, Kris McQuade, Elli Maclure, Grahame Bond, Ernie Bourne, Paddy Madden	Comedy / Western Feature film	IMDb
Tully	James Gatward	Anthony Valentine, Barbara Nielsen, Jack Thompson, Henri Szeps, Kevin Miles, John Stanton, William Redmond, Martin Phelan, Lyn James, Les Foxcroft, Michael Aitkens, Noeline Brown, Ken Goodlet, Phillip Ross, Edward Hepple, Richard Gilbert, Bob Hallett, Frankie Davidson, Ray Marshall, Tony Barry, Bruno Lawrence	Drama TV film	
Two-Way Mirror	Alan Coleman	Anne Charleston, Cornelia Frances, Peter Collingwood, Tristan Rogers, David Foster, Jill Forster, Phillip Ross, Vivienne Benson-Young, Julian Rockett, Ray Marshall, Lorna Lesley, Peter Hammond, Carol Lane, Sue Smithers, Stanley Walsh, Noel Brady, Babette Stephens, Julie Dawson, Roy Corbett, Ross Morton	TV film / TV Pilot	
We Are All Alone My Dear	Paul Cox	Jean May Campbell	Short	IMDb
We Should Call It a Living Room	Aleksander Danko		Short animation	IMDb

== See also ==
- 1975 in Australia
- 1975 in Australian television
