= 1975 in Australian television =

This is a list of Australian television-related events in 1975.

== Events ==
- 28 February – Television in Australia switches to full-time colour, marking the last day of Australian television in black and white. Colour transmission would launch officially on 1 March on Saturday at 12:00am. Seven Network, The 0-10 Network and ABC stayed on air all night for the occasion.
- 28 February – The ABC airs a spin-off television special of The Aunty Jack Show, called Aunty Jack Introduces Colour. It promotes the introduction of Australian television in colour.
- 1 March – "C-Day" in Australia; full-time colour broadcasting takes effect.
- 1 March – Australian music program Countdown arrives on to the scene with a bang by becoming the first program on ABC to be broadcast in colour with Johnny Farnham as the host. That episode was the show's real first episode, besides with the previous series lost.
- 1 March – British children's stop motion animated series The Wombles created by Elisabeth Beresford and narrated by Bernard Cribbins premieres on ABC.
- 21 March – The ABC broadcasts a collection of four comedy specials derived from The Aunty Jack Show titled Wollongong the Brave starting off with "Norman Gunston – The Golden Weeks".
- 12 May – American talk show host and singer Don Lane presents his very own talk show The Don Lane Show with Bert Newton as co host.
- 5 September – The 839th episode (also known as the infamous 'bomb-blast' episode) of the popular Australian soap opera Number 96, which wiped out four regular characters in a bid to reinstate the series' former top rating position, is shown on The 0-10 Network.
- 13 October – Australian news magazine program 11AM hosted by Roger Climpson debuts on Seven Network.
- 27 October - NTD returns to the air in Darwin, for the first time since Cyclone Tracy.
- 13 December – The Federal Election — barely a month after the controversial dismissal of the Whitlam government — gets coverage across all networks.
- TEN10 Sydney launches its first one-hour news service Eyewitness News.
- Graham Kennedy has been banned from making appearances on live television after his infamous "crow call" on The Graham Kennedy Show on Nine Network.

== Debuts ==
Program	Network	Debut date
Until Tomorrow	Seven Network	27 January
The Unisexers	Nine Network	9 February
Wollongong the Brave	ABC	21 March
The Don Lane Show	Nine Network	8 May
The Last of the Australians	Nine Network	2 August
Ben Hall	ABC	7 September
11AM	Seven Network	13 October
Shannon's Mob	Nine Network	27 October
Beat of the City	ABC	1975
Cash and Company	Seven Network	1975
This Is Your Life	Seven Network	1975
Pot of Gold	Channel 0	1975

=== New international programming ===
- 30 January – (United States) The Manhunter (Nine Network)
- 6 February – (United States) Little House on the Prairie (Nine Network)
- 10 February – (United States) The Rockford Files (Channel 0)
- 13 February – (United Kingdom) No, Honestly (Seven Network)
- 16 February – (United Kingdom) Some Mothers Do 'Ave 'Em (ABC)
- 17 February – (United States) Police Woman (Seven Network)
- 1 March – (United Kingdom) The Wombles (1973) (ABC)
- 3 March – (United Kingdom) Casanova '73 (ABC)
- 14 March – (United States) Hong Kong Phooey (Nine Network)
- 24 March – (United Kingdom) Softly, Softly: Task Force (ABV-2)
- 6 May – (United Kingdom) Carrie's War (ABC)
- 31 May – (United States) Valley of the Dinosaurs (Nine Network)
- 7 June – (United States) Shazam! (Channel 0)
- 21 June – (United States) Movin' On (Channel 0)
- 14 July – (United States) Dinah! (Nine Network)
- 30 August – (United States) Petrocelli (Nine Network)
- 7 September – (United Kingdom) It Ain't Half Hot Mum (ABC)
- 5 October – (United Kingdom) Moody and Pegg (ABC)
- 8 October – (United States) The New Adventures of Gilligan (Channel 0)
- 20 October – (United Kingdom) Bod (ABC)
- 3 November – (United States) Nakia (Nine Network)
- 3 November – (United States) Sigmund and the Sea Monsters (Nine Network)
- 4 November – (United Kingdom) Crystal Tipps and Alistair (ABC)
- 15 November – (United States) Paper Moon (Nine Network)

== Television shows ==
=== 1950s ===
- Mr. Squiggle and Friends (1959–1999).

=== 1960s ===
- Four Corners (1961–present).
- It's Academic (1968–1978)
- Division 4 (1969–1975)

=== 1970s ===
- Hey Hey It's Saturday (1971–1999, 2009–2010).
- Young Talent Time (1971–1988)
- Countdown (1974–1987).
- The Don Lane Show (1975–1983).

== Ending this year ==
Date	Show	Channel	Debut
28 February	The Unisexers	Nine Network	9 February 1975
17 April	The Graham Kennedy Show	Nine Network	19 September 1972
3 October	Until Tomorrow	Seven Network	27 January 1975
25 November	Division 4	Nine Network	11 March 1969
8 December	Wollongong the Brave	ABC	21 March 1975
1975	Ben Hall	ABC	7 September 1975
1975	Class of 74	Seven Network	18 March 1974
1975	Great Temptation	Seven Network	1970

== See also ==
- 1975 in Australia
- List of Australian films of 1975
