= Three-mile laws =

Three-mile laws refer to laws requiring all liquor stores, bars, and other liquor establishments to be built at least three miles (4.8 km) away from churches or schools. These laws were passed during the temperance movement in many southern and mid-western states during the 19th and early 20th centuries. Three-mile laws were normally passed at the local or county level, but some laws were passed by state governments. Some remote counties still enact the three-miles laws today.

== See also ==
- Alcoholic beverage control state
