= Tennessee Alcoholic Beverage Commission =

Agency of the U.S. state of Tennessee

- Abbreviation: TABC
- Formation: 1963
- Type: Public safety organization
- Headquarters: 500 James Robertson Pkwy Floor 3 Nashville, Tennessee 37243
- Executive Director: Russell Thomas
- East Tennessee Commission Member: David Tomita
- Middle Tennessee Commission Member: Ashleigh Roberts
- West Tennessee Commission Member: Tim Wirgau
- Main organ: Governing board of three appointed commissioners
- Website: www.tn.gov/abc.html/

The Tennessee Alcoholic Beverage Commission (TABC) is a Tennessee state government agency responsible for licensing or permitting participants in the alcoholic beverages industry in Tennessee. (Note: Tennessee is not an alcoholic beverage control state.) The agency is headquartered in Nashville, Tennessee. The agency has a three-member commission, consisting of one member each from West Tennessee, East Tennessee, and Middle Tennessee. As of July 2024, the executive director is Russell Thomas.

== Leadership ==
The agency is governed by a three-member commission appointed by the Governor of Tennessee, each member residing in a different Grand Division and serving a term concurrent with the governor’s term of office. The commission members are David Tomita for East Tennessee, Ashleigh Roberts for Middle Tennessee, and Tim Wirgau for West Tennessee.

== History ==
The Tennessee Alcoholic Beverage Commission was founded in 1963.
