= 1974–75 Sheffield Shield season =

Australian cricket tournament

- Cricket format: First-class
- Tournament format: Double round-robin
- Champions: Western Australia (5th title)
- Participants: 5
- Matches: 20
- Most runs: Rick McCosker (New South Wales) (898)
- Most wickets: Jim Higgs (Victoria) (39)

The 1974–75 Sheffield Shield season was the 73rd season of the Sheffield Shield, the domestic first-class cricket competition of Australia. Western Australia won its third Sheffield Shield championship in four seasons.

== Table ==
Team	Played	Won	Drawn	Lost	Batting points	Bowling points	Total Points
Western Australia	8	3	3	2	34	32	96
Queensland	8	4	2	2	16	35	91
Victoria	8	4	1	3	27	21	88
New South Wales	8	3	3	2	24	31	85
South Australia	8	1	1	6	15	28	53

== Statistics ==
=== Most Runs ===
Rick McCosker 898

=== Most Wickets ===
Jim Higgs 39
