= Kentucky Office of Alcoholic Beverage Control =

The Kentucky Office of Alcoholic Beverage Control is an agency of the government of the U.S. state of Kentucky, within the state's Department of Public Protection and Environmental and Public Protection Cabinet.

The department was created by the Kentucky General Assembly in 1944 by KRS 241.015 and 241.030. Its mission is to regulate the traffic in alcoholic beverages and enforce applicable laws and regulations. It also combats youth access to alcoholic beverages and tobacco products.

The ABC board comprises an executive director and chairman, a distilled spirits administrator, a malt beverage administrator, and a board secretary. As of February 2008, Norman E. Arflack is the office's executive director.
