= 1974–75 Australian bushfire season =

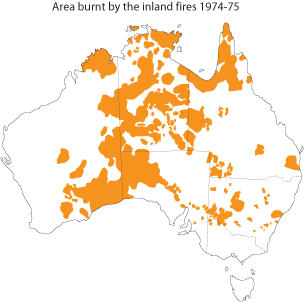
- The area burnt in the inland fires of 1974-1975
- Date: October 1974 – February 1975
- Location: New South Wales; Northern Territory; Queensland; South Australia; Western Australia; Victoria

Statistics
- Total area: 117 million hectares (290 million acres)

Impacts
- Deaths: 6
- Livestock lost: 57,000
- Structures destroyed: 10,200 kilometres (6,300 mi) of fencing

The 1974–75 Australian bushfire season is a series of bushfires, also known around the world as wildfires, that burned across Australia. Fires that summer burned up an estimated 117 million hectares (290 million acres; 1,170,000 square kilometres; 450,000 square miles). Approximately 15% of Australia's land mass suffered "extensive fire damage" including parts of New South Wales, the Northern Territory, Queensland, South Australia and Western Australia.

== Statistics ==
The fires killed six people, approximately 57,000 farm animals, farmers' crops, and destroyed nearly 10,200 kilometres (6,300 mi) of fencing.

The Australian Bureau of Statistics attributed the extent of the fires to "exceptionally heavy rainfall in the previous two years".

Stephen J. Pyne qualified the fire season as the most destructive event in terms of hectares burned among historical fires in Australia, but added that "the 1974/75 fires had almost no impact and much of the damage was found by satellite after the fact." Nonetheless, fire historian Danielle Clode notes that these fires remain significant for being the biggest bushfire event by area ever recorded. In 2011, retired Australian government scientist David Packham warned that "we are in for one big season" that could repeat the 1974 summer fires.

== Areas impacted ==
Australia, being a federation of States and territories, breaks up the 1974–1975 fires by state or region:

New South Wales

Six people killed. Area burned: 3.5 million hectares (8.6 million acres). 50,000 livestock lost, 10,170 kilometres (6,320 mi) of fencing destroyed. Bourke to Balranald, Cobar Shire, Moolah–Corinya—most of the Western Division. Lost crops, and widespread damage to infrastructure, including communications, roads and railways.

The Moolah-Corinya fire was "the largest fire ever contained by man in New South Wales without the help of the weather." It burned 1.166 million hectares (2.88 million acres) and its perimeter was over 1,000 kilometres (620 mi).

Northern Territory

Area burned: 45 million hectares (110 million acres). The fire reached Barkly Tableland, Victoria River district, near Newcastle Waters.

Queensland

The bushfire season was defined as October 1974 to February 1975. Area burned: 7.3 million hectares (18 million acres). 95 cattle, 6,850 sheep lost. Areas damaged: Thargomindah, Bulloo Shire, Boulia Urandangie, McKinlay Shire.

South Australia

Area burned: 15 million hectares (37 million acres). The areas affected were the north-west of the state (arid and semi-arid zones), and the Adelaide Hills.

Western Australia

Area burned: 29 million hectares (72 million acres) of fires, damaging east and north-east of Kalgoorlie.
