= Savoy Hotel fire =

Deadly 1975 hotel fire in Sydney, Australia

- Date: 25 December 1975
- Venue: Savoy Hotel
- Location: Kings Cross, Sydney, Australia; 33°52′25.1″S 151°13′24.6″E
- Type: Fire
- Deaths: 15
- Injuries: 25

The Savoy Hotel on Darlinghurst Road, Kings Cross, Sydney, Australia was set alight by a serial arsonist on 25 December 1975 with the loss of 15 lives. It was the deadliest hotel fire in Australia at that time.

== The fire ==
On 25 December 1975 the four story Savoy was packed with local workers and holiday makers. At 5:00 a.m., Reginald John Little, a 25-year-old cook and a petty thief stood at the rear entry door to the basement. He was angry.

He had an arrangement with his Leichardt-based lover Warren to have dinner and stay the night. Warren had stood him up.

As a guest of the hotel he had a key for the back door. Inside, to his right, was a stack of used newspapers. He lit them and went up to his room, number 33. The fire, starved of oxygen, smouldered for half an hour. The night watchman alerted by smoke opened the front door. This resulted in a backdraft with the fire racing to the ground and first floor.

The only internal egress points, the front and rear stairs were impassable due to the heat and smoke.

Out of the 60 guests in the hotel, 15 died, including 5 on the 3rd floor. Many people were found badly burned in their rooms or corridors, some charred beyond recognition.

== Perpetrator ==
Prior to the fire in 1975, Reginald Little had been convicted in other arson cases, including setting a shop on fire in New South Wales and setting a billiard table on fire at a club after he had been let go from a job.

Little was charged with four counts of murder and a fifth count of maliciously setting fire to a dwelling house knowing the caretaker was in residence. On each of the four murder counts the judge sentenced him (separately) to life imprisonment and ‘penal servitude’ for 14 years from 14 February 1976.

Little was at the low-security St Heliers prison farm where he served as a captain of a New South Wales country bush fire brigade. When there were no fires he did fire reduction work such as burn-offs. The fire control officer in charge had heard rumours that he was an arsonist, but did nothing to confirm this. He was ordered back in full-time custody when Corrective Services Commissioner Ron Woodham was informed in 1993.

He was released on parole from Silverwater jail on 12 May 2010, despite never having admitted to the crime.

== Related incident ==
The Savoy Hotel was owned by alleged crime boss Abe Saffron. He also owned the building next to it, then housing the Pink Panther strip club with upstairs a brothel called the Kingsdore Motel. In 1989 this building, then the Downunder Hostel, burned down with the loss of six lives. Saffron has been linked to seven other fires. There is no proof he orchestrated any of the rumoured fires.
