= Patrick Perry =

- Born: 14 February 1903; Oakey, Queensland
- Died: 10 May 1975 (aged 72); Indooroopilly, Queensland
- Military career
- Allegiance: Australia
- Branch: Royal Australian Navy
- Service years: 1921–1963
- Rank: Rear Admiral
- Conflicts: Second World War; Battle of the Coral Sea; Guadalcanal campaign
- Awards: Commander of the Order of the British Empire

Rear Admiral Patrick Perry, CBE (14 February 1903 – 10 May 1975) was a senior officer of the Royal Australian Navy (RAN). A paymaster officer, he served as secretary to successive heads of the RAN, retiring as Fourth Naval Member of the Naval Board and Chief of Supply in 1963.
