= Frank Love =

Australian rules footballer

Personal information
- Full name: Frank Love
- Born: 22 February 1888; Nhill, Victoria
- Died: 27 May 1969 (aged 81); Whyalla, South Australia
- Height: 188 cm (6 ft 2 in)
- Weight: 89 kg (196 lb)

Playing career^{1}
Years	Club	Games (Goals)
1910–14	Richmond	49 (0)
- ^{1} Playing statistics correct to the end of 1914.

Frank Love (22 February 1888 – 27 May 1969) was an Australian rules footballer who played with Richmond in the Victorian Football League (VFL).
