= The Graham Kennedy Show =

- Presented by: Graham Kennedy
- Country of origin: Australia
- Original language: English
- No. of seasons: 4

Production
- Executive producer: Don Silverman
- Running time: Approximately 60 minutes (inc. commercials)
- Production company: Screen Gems Australia

Original release
- Network: Nine Network
- Release: 19 September 1972 – 17 April 1975

The Graham Kennedy Show is an Australian variety and comedy tonight show, the best-known iteration of which debuted on 19 September 1972 on the Nine Network.

As early as 1960 there was a program of this name shown live in Melbourne on Friday nights in place of In Melbourne Tonight (IMT), which Kennedy typically hosted. The program was recorded to be shown in Brisbane, Adelaide and Sydney. It debuted on 12 February 1960 and lasted until the end of 1961 p.78 After this time, IMT continued with Kennedy as the most popular of many hosts.

On 23 December 1969, Kennedy quit as host of IMT due to exhaustion and rested for two years. In spite of his fame and fortune, he later described that period as "years of misery".

After specials on 15 November 1971 and 2 March 1972, he returned with this series produced by Bob Phillips and Peter Faiman. The concept, regular cast and crew were mainly recycled from the IMT days, with Brian Rangott leading the GTV band for live musical performances. As the series began pushing more permissive humour boundaries from 1973, it received a suitable for Adults Only (AO) superimposed viewer guidance at the beginning.

Kennedy sparked controversy after a "crow-call", which sounded like the word "fuck", was broadcast in March 1975. Forced to prerecord from that point on, he abruptly departed following GTV-9 management's censorship of the 16 April 1975 edition.

Episodes from March 1975 were transmitted in "living colour from Television City Melbourne" according to the opening and closing voiceovers. Following Kennedy's resignation, the final two April shows were hosted by Noel Ferrier and Daryl Somers.

== Crow call incident ==
On the show of 3 March 1975 (his first seen in colour), Kennedy imitated a crow, saying "faaaaaaark", during a live read of a Cedel hairspray advertisement by announcer Rosemary Margan. Kennedy later claimed the Adelaide network station immediately cut the live feed of that show. The Nine Network reportedly received hundreds of complaints, followed by a rash of newspaper headlines the next day. This led the Australian Broadcasting Control Board to request that Kennedy "show cause" why he should not be removed from the airwaves. Kennedy replied that he could not show cause, suggesting that the Board take action to limit his appearances, while hinting at legal action should they do so. Rather than removing him, the ABCB banned Kennedy from appearing live, forcing him to pre-record the show on videotape.

In 2002, in The Age newspaper, media writer Jonathan Green reported that the crow call segment was in fact pretaped and that the controversy was probably just a pretext for other issues. Rival Nine personality Ernie Sigley, who presented his own variety show on different nights to Kennedy, has claimed the real reason Kennedy was axed was that his ratings were so poor compared to Sigley's.

According to Age reporter Suzanne Carbone, the first known use of the expletive on Australian television was in the 1960s, when Nine Adelaide evening news presenter Kevin Crease said "fucking hell" during a mishap in a live advertisement on variety show Adelaide Tonight. Crease told The Age that "The audience fell off their chairs laughing" and that he was amazed no complaints were received and that although he feared he would be sacked, nothing happened.

During the February 1973 Logie Awards, American actor Michael Cole generated controversy after accepting an award from host Bert Newton, while apparently drunk, uttering the word "shit" in a short, incoherent acceptance speech. This was apparently the first time that profanity had been heard on Australian national television.

== Criticism of Doug McClelland ==
Having been forced to tape his shows "indefinitely" by the Australian Broadcasting Tribunal, the network took advantage of the pretaping to completely edit out Kennedy's scathing attack on Senator Doug McClelland, the then Minister for the Media, for his failure to support local content regulations for television on the 16 April 1975 edition.

According to Kennedy's biographer, Graeme Blundell, Kennedy resigned from Nine after this controversy, just six weeks after the "crow call" incident.

Kennedy's words which never made it to air were:

Good evening.

Little serious bit to start with: Senator Douglas McClelland, ahh, is really copping it in the press at the moment. All this week, every paper you pick up, there's a, there's a roast of the Senator.

And like most Australians, I hate to kick a man when he's down.

(audience laughter)

But in Doug McClelland's case, I happily make an exception.

(audience laughter)

He has failed, and he knows it too. Now, the public know it.

This misguided Minister took credit for a mythical boom in television production. Now, there is no boom.

Employment in television production is down this year, by over 30 percent, and that's a fact.

His point system has proved utterly ineffective, and I wonder if you can remember who that little blond-headed fellow was, who works on television, who originally pointed out that it wouldn't work.

(audience: Graham!)

That's right.

(audience laughter)

We are all suffering from the lack of local content at the moment. I'm being thrashed in the surveys because constantly being thrown at, up against me are shows like the Academy Awards, imported films, and cheap television series, all purchased for a few hundred dollars from the Yanks.

Now some of these - when I say a few hundred dollars, by the time it's amortised over the network, that's how much the program costs. Now we can't compete, umm, with the price of these shows.

We cannot: this is a, what is this, a six thousand dollar a night ... uhh, we can play Mrs. Miniver for, err, ninepence.

(audience laughter)

It's beneath my dignity to even go into the laughable and inane carryings-on of the Australian Broadcasting Control Board which the good Minister of the Crown, Senator Douglas McClelland, is in charge of, but I know I can speak for a lot of my colleagues in this industry, and several other industries in the entertainment field, when I demand, here, tonight, nationally, that Senator McClelland be dismissed from office; and I would suggest most strongly that the portfol... the portfolio itself be dropped.

That's all I want to say.

During a segment featuring guest Daryl Somers, Kennedy said that he'd let it be known that Somers would make a suitable replacement host "... should I be on my way". In the first commercial break, Kennedy addressed the opening comments off-air with the studio audience, wondering if the network would cut the remarks, and stating that if they did, he would repeat them live on the ABC current affairs program This Day Tonight. He made the same threat on-air during the "wheel" segment later in the episode, with he and Bert Newton both effectively repeating the opening remarks. Kennedy also remarked that McClelland was "not all that literate", and that "he has to go".

The opening segment was indeed edited out before the show went to air and Kennedy resigned in anger. He did not, however, follow through with the threat to repeat the comments on This Day Tonight, with an ABC spokesman later commenting that Kennedy had decided that it "would not be in his interests" to appear.

Australian content on television was a highly sensitive issue at this time. In the wake of the controversial McLean Report, the Whitlam government was taking major steps to open up the radio spectrum with the introduction of community broadcasting and the ABC's new rock station, 2JJ, but it had done nothing to address the low levels of local content on Australian television.

Aware of the media's crucial role in its own election in 1972, and understandably fearful of a backlash if it forced unpopular content quotas on the industry, the government steered well clear of any serious re-examination of the current structure and did little to increase levels of Australian content on television.

The proposal to increase local content had long been advocated local producers, writers and actors, but it was bitterly opposed by the networks, who relied on being able to buy large blocks of American programming at a fraction of what it would have cost to produce similar shows locally. The problem was compounded by the Whitlam government's far-reaching 1973 decision to reduce tariffs across the board by 25% in the first move towards today's highly successful "free trade" policies. The immediate result of the tariff reduction was that overseas programming became even cheaper. Also at this time, the networks were being targeted by the "TV - Make It Australian" campaign, which involved a number of prominent Australian actors and television personalities including Kennedy and several leading actors from the popular police shows made by Crawford Productions, notably Gerard Kennedy and Charles "Bud" Tingwell. The cancellation of all three major Crawford Productions police shows within months of each other during 1975 has been portrayed by Tingwell and others as an act of revenge by the networks for Crawford's active support for the campaign and the participation of its contract players. Following this logic, Blundell suggests that Kennedy too was a victim of the Nine television network's sensitivity about the local content issue. It has also been suggested that, with a federal election looming, Nine used the crow call incident as a pretext to remove the politically vocal Kennedy, who was known to support the ALP.

== Home media ==
Four episodes of The Graham Kennedy Show were released on DVD by Umbrella Entertainment in May 2013. The episodes feature rare uncut footage, including the complete edited McClelland remarks.

During Kennedy's 60th birthday special, Ray Martin visited the GTV-9 videotape archive shelves and purportedly held up the cassette case of the offending crow-call program. He reported it was marked "Never to be broadcast again."
