= Williamtown RAAF Base Group (heritage listing) =

RAAF Base Williamtown Buildings
- Location within New South Wales
- 32.7970°S 151.8361°E
- Location: Medowie Road, RAAF Base Williamtown, New South Wales, Australia

Commonwealth Heritage List
- Official name: Williamtown RAAF Base Group
- Type: Listed place (Historic)
- Designated: 22 June 2004
- Reference no.: 105639

The Williamtown RAAF Base Group is a heritage-listed group of Royal Australian Air Force (RAAF) buildings and other items at RAAF Base Williamtown in New South Wales, Australia. It was added to the Australian Commonwealth Heritage List on 22 June 2004.

== History ==
The area of the base, on coastal land, was first settled as grants probably initially used for pastoral grazing. Colonel Kenneth Snodgrass was granted 1,120 acres (453 ha) in 1840, preceded by William Harvey's grant of 640 acres (259 ha) in 1839.

In the 1880s Snodgrass's original grant was subdivided into small farms for dairy farming. William Harvey's grant had been broken up by the 1860s, also into small farms, at a time when the village area of Williamtown was first established. A school and post office had opened by 1868. By the 1920s the area had become part of the farm district supplying the Raymond Terrace Cooperative Dairy and Produce Company Ltd, set up in 1904.

RAAF Base Williamtown appears to have grown from the recognition by local authorities in 1938 that Newcastle needed additional airport facilities to relieve pressure on the field at District Park, Broadmeadow. The Willamtown site was selected by the Australian Government and surveyed in August 1939, for the construction of an emergency landing ground prior to the onset of the World War II. An overriding factor was the proximity of Newcastle's steel mills and coal mines. A Hunter Water pumping station was erected in the late 1930s as part of the Tomago Sandbeds Water Supply Scheme, with a separate second pumping station erected to service the base.

Work began in January 1940 with £22,000 being spent on construction as part of the Government of New South Wales Unemployment Relief Program. Four runways were completed by September 1940. From September 1940 new facilities included a guard house, staff garages, control tower, flight operations room, medical rooms, kitchen, mess, airmen's and flight sergeants' dormitories and a compound for the construction authorities. By mid-December 1940 a total of 62 buildings had been completed in the "camp area" in the south-east sector of the aerodrome. The RAAF did not take over the base until February 1941, although Lockheed Hudson bombers had been stationed there as a temporary base for anti-submarine operations.

The base was officially opened in February 1941, participating in the Empire Air Training Scheme as a mustering centre for airmen. Landscaping at this time included grassing over the parade ground and tree planting on Townsend Avenue. From September 1941 to February 1942 the base operated as No.2 Recruit Depot, with the aerodrome upgraded to provide for an operational base. In June 1941 5 bomb-dump buildings were erected and by October runways 1 and 3 (of 4) were extended. By November six aircraft dispersal bays had been constructed to the south of the site, each with two shelter hangars.

Following the entry of the United States of America into the War, use of the base was transferred to Southern Area Command (RAAF) in January 1942. Formal administration of the base was taken over by American forces from May 1942 to September 1942. With the departure of the Central Gunnery School, No. 4 Operational Training Unit was raised in October 1942. At its peak, the base had some 888 personnel including 115 from the Women's Auxiliary Australian Air Force (WAAAF). New lecture halls and test facilities, including gas chambers, were erected to complement the four Bellman hangars and five workshop hangars.

Following the end of the War in the Pacific in August 1945, the number of personnel was rapidly reduced. At the end of 1945 the RAAF had 317 mainland and regional airfields. Of these some 12 were considered of strategic importance; Butterworth, Cocos Island, Momote, Darwin, Learmonth, Williamtown, Townsville, Pearce, East Sale, Richmond and Amberley. Willamtown became the peacetime base for the RAAF fighter wing. In August 1946, RAAF Station Williamtown became the base of No. 78 (Fighter) Wing.

In November 1948 the School of Land/Air Warfare, a joint services training unit, was established at Williamtown. Two army units, the parachute and air portability training wings, were attached to the School. A parachute tower and armament range were provided. In 1958 the School was renamed the Air Support Unit. In 1976 a new purpose-built facility, for the renamed Australia Joint Warfare Establishment, was completed at Williamtown.

Between 1949 and 1951 involvement in the Korean War led to re-equipping with de Havilland Vampire jet fighter aircraft, with Williamtown the focus of RAAF training. Following the introduction of jet aircraft, the base was rebuilt from 1950 as funds became available. New works included a sealed, concrete runway 8,700 feet long at a cost of 750,000 pounds, the first to be constructed during post-war restructuring, and refueling facilities, to accommodate Gloster Meteors and the Sabre jet fighters from 1955, replaced in 1967 by the new Dassault Mirage III. During the 1950s and 1960s works included a new Control Tower (1958–1961), a new parachute tower, new bomb dump buildings, a compound of 16 Nissen Huts, new two-storey brick quarters for non-married officers and a second series of brick sleeping quarters for 532 airmen. As late as 1955 there were still some airmen accommodated in tents. Between 1959 and 1964 a number of Bellman hangars were relocated to the base. In addition 21 brick married quarters and 17 prefabricated married quarters were provided, the first erected west of Medowie Road at the edge of the base. This reflected the policy that homes should be provided for 40% of the established posts at each RAAF base. A modern brick officer's mess, swimming pool, water treatment plant, airmen's mess, ration store, airmen's laundry, NCO accommodation and mess, a chapel and street lighting completed the modernisation program. In 1965 a four-year program resulted in the construction of 3 new hangars, extensions and a new armaments workshop.

In 1983 upgrade works commenced at RAAF Base Williamtown to support the new 75 F/A 18 aircraft, which replaced the Mirage by 1989. In 1988 RAAF Butterworth was downgraded, RAAF Base Williamtown becoming the new headquarters for the Tactical Fighter group. New facilities included headquarters buildings, hangars, workshops, stores, medical facilities and a base chapel.

From 1997 new Defence development initiatives, under the Defence Reform Program, have resulted in planned changes to the base.

The commercial operation south of the runways, implemented in the 1962–1994 period with the permission of the RAAF, was subsequently leased to the Newcastle Airport organisation in 1992.

== Description ==
RAAF Base Williamtown buildings are at located at RAAF Base Williamtown, Medowie Road. The site consists of a number of buildings and structures

=== From the 1939–1945 period ===
Buildings and structures from the 1939–1945 period include:

- Henderson Road and the road network for the original camp, comprising Eaton Road, Ford Road and Townsend Avenue west of McNamara Drive.
- parade ground
- Bellman hangars
- four underground fuel tanks
- dispersal taxiway associated with fuel tank
- sections of Runways 1 and 4
- sub station and emergency powerhouse
- tennis courts
- pump house

=== From the post-war period to c. 1964 ===
After World War II, the base evolved in response to the location of the World War II infrastructure and buildings and the extended main runway of the 1950s, which was the dominant alignment and feature of the site. Buildings and structures from post-World War II period to circa 1964 include:

- the main concrete runway, northern taxiways and hard standing area
- additional Bellman hangars
- explosives storage
- control tower
- stores
- armament preparation units
- original test butt
- first airmen's brick dormitory block
- officer's dormitories and the officers mess
- airmen's dormitory block
- brick married quarters

=== World War Two ===
In common with the former RAAF Base Fairbairn, Canberra, and other RAAF bases, the Williamtown facility was planned as a series of functional zones on a rectangular road grid, the parade ground forming a focus between the dormitory areas and messes and the workshops and hangars at the intersection of Townsend Avenue and Frost Street. Three prefabricated Bellman hangars are in their original location, defining the original aprons serving Runway No.1. Four underground fuel tanks have survived changes to the runway system as has a small section of the dispersal taxiway associated with a fuel tank and a short section of Runway 4 (1940). The alignments of Runways 1 and 4 are reflected in the intersection and alignment of Knox-Knight and Townsend Avenue.

The road network south of Ford Road and west of, and including, McNamara Drive identifies the early camp and operations structures and the major alignments of the early runway system. Characteristically, extant buildings from this period are aligned with the road layout, sub-station and emergency powerhouse, Bellman hangars with sufficient structures and services remaining to illustrate the separation of functions and the wartime functioning of the base. The tennis courts provided for the NCOs and officers and the community hall (located in Williamtown Village) have also survived. The pump house is located within the site, as is the Hunter Water pumping station of the late 1930s, although it is not owned by Defence.

The portable Bellman hangar, of which some 123 were made, was designed in England for quick dismantling and erection, and manufactured by Lysaghts of Newcastle. They were steel framed with a low-pitched roof covered with corrugated galvanised iron sheeting. The extension of the door supports beyond the shell of the building allowed maximum access to the usable spaces.

The community hall and pump house were erected in the prevailing timber framed weatherboard vernacular style, with corrugated galvanized iron hipped roofs. The community hall features gablets to the main roof.

=== Post War to c. 1964 (pre Mirage 1965) ===
The main concrete runway and northern taxiways defined the focus of operations and built on the underlying planning with the addition of relocated Bellman hangars and new bomb dumps. The steel framed control tower replaced the earlier tower. In addition workshops, stores, explosive storage areas and armament preparation units were added. The original test butt for the early jet fighter aircraft, was constructed in in-situ reinforced concrete.

The planning of sealed roads included Townsend, Henderson, Perrin and Knox-Knight Roads and the realigned Medowie Road. Henderson Road follows the original alignment of Medowie Road. The first airmen's brick dormitory block was erected in 1955 followed the alignments of the earlier road system. Noticeably, later dormitory buildings were arranged in a diagonal manner across the blocks. These included the officer's dormitory compound, the officers mess and airmen's brick dormitory blocks in the same area as the wartime camp. These units were erected to replace the hut style accommodation of the wartime and immediate post-war years.

Brick married quarters were the first new married quarters erected (before 1954). The cottages are simple rectangular units with gabled, tiled roofs and generous windows. The lounge rooms feature gable wall fireplaces and chimneys. The first airmen's brick dormitory block (1955), the transient airmen's sleeping quarters, is H-shaped in plan, and comprises two two-storey gabled, pitched roof blocks with tiled roofs joined by a single storey, linking block. The later two-storey accommodation blocks are also gabled but with colorbond roofing. The first airmen's brick dormitory block features simple timber sash windows, but has some stylistic content in the projecting entrance porch, characteristic of the late 1950s and early 1960s.

=== Comparison ===
The road network for the original camp, comprising Eaton Road, Ford Road and Townsend Avenue west of McNamara Drive, was completed by 1945. Typically, the alignment of wartime and early post war buildings, such as the first airmen's brick dormitory block, was dictated by the road layout. As an operational wartime base from 1939 to 1945 the provision of Bellman hangars (demountable, prefabricated structures) followed established patterns, also used at RAAF Base Amberley which was developed at the same time. The hangar group typically interfaced between workshops and administration and taxiways and runways.

Although individual bases, such as Fairbairn, Darwin, Amberley and Williamtown show differences in the degree of formal planning, they are organized on a similar functional basis, with the social hierarchy of the RAAF clearly reflected in the location, range and type of accommodation provided.

The post-war development of RAAF Base Williamtown reinforced the functional planning of the wartime years. Brick accommodation units used at RAAF Base Richmond from 1935 to 1937 were used as models for the two-storey airman's brick dormitory block erected in 1955. The use of prefabricated housing units stemmed from post-war shortages of materials, which impacted on both the Australian Government and the private sector. The early brick and tile houses (the married quarters) clearly follow designs prepared by the Australian Government and used in the late 1950s and early 1960s in Canberra.

=== Condition ===
As at July 2002, all buildings and structures, with the possible exception of redundant underground fuel tanks and early runway remnants, appeared to be maintained in good order.

=== Integrity ===
The evolving landscape of the base represents three periods:

- 1939–1945 World War II
- 1946–1964 post World War II and the early jet age
- 1965–1982 the Mirage jet fighter

As at July 2002, the fabric relating to each of these periods or phases remains essentially intact to document changes in the landscape, which continues to express the original planning and layout of the base during the period 1939–1945. In common with operational changes on other RAAF bases, the Bellman hangars have been modified by the addition of extensions and have in most cases been reclad externally, although the structural frames remain intact. Of the in situ hangars, from 1939 to 1945, Hangar 172 is the most intact retaining the original sliding door systems intact. The parade ground is now used for car parking and is also used for small storage buildings.

== Heritage listing ==
RAAF Base Williamtown buildings were listed on the Australian Commonwealth Heritage List on 22 June 2004 having satisfied the following criteria.

=== Criterion A: Processes ===
The evolving landscape of RAAF Base Williamtown, comprising Henderson Road, the road network of the 1939–1945 camp, 1939–1945 buildings and structures (substation and emergency powerhouse, underground fuel tanks, parade ground, tennis courts, Bellman hangars, and associated taxiways, sections of runways 1 and 4 and the pump house) and post-war structures and buildings (the main runway and northern taxiways and hardstanding, additional Bellman hangars, married quarters, the first airmen's dormitory block, stores, test butt, armament preparation units, explosives storage, airmen's dormitory blocks, officer's dormitories, and control tower) is important as the operational and training focus for Australia's jet fighter aircraft. These include the Vampire (1949–1955), Sabre (1955–1964), Mirage (1965–1982) and F/A 18 Hornet (1983–present). Australia's involvement in the Korean War (1949–1951) promoted the development of the base, which in 1945, following the World War II (1939–1945), had been one of ten mainland RAAF bases considered strategically important to Australia's defence, as peacetime base for the RAAF fighter wing. In 1988 RAAF Base Williamtown became the Headquarters for the Tactical Fighter Group.

The site was selected for the RAAF in August 1939, when the site was surveyed for an emergency landing ground, a significant factor in its selection being its proximity to Newcastle's steel mills and coal mines. The base is also significant for the use of limited resources through the Government of New South Wales Unemployment Relief Program and the completion of four runways in 1940. Officially opened in February 1941, the base is historically significant for its contribution to the Empire Air Training Scheme as No. 2 Recruit Depot and as No. 4 Operational Training Unit between 1942 and 1945.

The development of the base in the post-war years reinforced the importance of the peacetime role of RAAF Base Williamtown. This strategic role was reinforced in 1950 by the construction of the first concrete runway in Australia. The strategic role was also reflected in the construction of separate married quarters, reflecting the policy that homes should be provided for at least 40% of the established posts. New headquarters buildings and operational facilities, as well as accommodation for airmen and an equivalent investment in recreational facilities and messes, reinforced the strategic, peacetime role of RAAF Base Williamtown. The wartime and postwar development period 1939–1964, which saw the development of the underlying planning and the introduction of jet fighter aircraft, is the primary focus of this assessment.

==== Criterion B: Rarity ====
The main runway (1950) at RAAF Base Williamtown is of exceptional interest as the first concrete runway constructed in Australia, and as the dedicated operational focus of Australia's RAAF Fighter Wing. The Test Butts are of particular importance for their association with the early use of jet fighters by the RAAF.

==== Criterion D: Characteristic values ====
The street layout of the initial "camp area", including the grid pattern road layout, the alignment of Medowie Road (Henderson Road), Parade Ground, Bellman Hangars and the northern taxiway areas (including the alignment of runway 1 and part of the dispersal taxiway associated with runways 1 and 4) and the underground fuel tanks, are important in illustrating the principal functional characteristics of RAAF bases developed in the immediate pre-war years and the early years of the World War II. The Bellman hangars as a group, including in particular the World War 2 hangars, are important in illustrating the principal characteristics and uses of this wartime prefabricated hangar, which enabled the rapid development of RAAF facilities on many World War II RAAF bases. The married quarters and two storey accommodation blocks for officers and airmen (including officer's dormitories and the first airmen's brick dormitory block and officers' dormitory compound) are important in illustrating the approach to the provision of permanent, up-to-date brick housing from 1955, during the consolidation of the RAAF's peacetime role. Other buildings important in illustrating the principal characteristics of RAAF facilities developed in the 1950s and 1960s, including overall planning road layout and function, include the officers mess and the new workshops, stores and the armament preparation units.

==== Criterion G: Social value ====
RAAF base Williamtown is important to the RAAF and the wider community for its symbolic, cultural and social associations as Australia's dedicated RAAF fighter base.

==== Criterion I: Indigenous tradition ====
Indigenous and Natural values of national estate significance exist on this site.
