= Arkansas Alcoholic Beverage Control Division =

The Alcoholic Beverage Control Division is an Arkansas state government agency. The duties of the division include receiving applications for and issuing permits to manufacture, wholesale, retail and transport alcoholic beverages in Arkansas.

The agency also promulgates and adopts rules and regulations necessary to comply with alcoholic beverage control laws in the state, and also conducts hearings for the purpose of cancellation, suspension or revocation of any and all alcoholic beverage permits.
