= Mississippi Office of Alcoholic Beverage Control =

Agency of the U.S. state of Mississippi

The Mississippi Office of Alcoholic Beverage Control (MS ABC) is a Mississippi state government agency responsible for licensing or permitting participants in the alcoholic beverages industry in Mississippi. The agency is part of the Mississippi Department of Revenue. Mississippi is an alcoholic beverage control state, thus the state has a monopoly over the wholesaling or retailing of some or all categories of alcoholic beverages.

The agency was established in 1966, when the state ended its prohibition of liquor, which had been adopted in 1907 (beer was allowed starting in 1933). Mississippi was the first state to ratify the Eighteenth Amendment, which initiated Prohibition, and never ratified the Twenty-first Amendment, which ended Prohibition.

In Mississippi, sales of beer and light wine (not exceeding 10.3% and 6.25% alcohol by volume, respectively) are permitted in grocery stores. Otherwise, the state controls the sales of liquor and wine, for both wholesale and retail. As of 2017, this was implemented by "550 individually owned and operated package stores and 2,000 individually owned retail outlets."

In 2023, MS ABC contracted out operations of their aging warehouse to Ruan Transport Corporation. In January 2026 Ruan Transport Corporation closed the warehouse to conduct an inventory and to upgrade the management system, however, when the warehouse re-opened Ruan Transport Corporation found that the new system was incapable of managing the conveyer belts that the warehouse used. As of April 2026 the issue remains unresolved and a backlog of 200,000 orders exists.
