= Iowa Alcoholic Beverages Division =

Agency in the US state of Iowa

The Iowa Alcoholic Beverages Division is the alcoholic beverage control authority for the U.S. state of Iowa. Since March 8, 1934, it has regulated the traffic in, and maintained a monopoly on the wholesaling of, alcoholic beverages in the state, thus making Iowa an alcoholic beverage control state.

In fiscal year 2013, the Division generated over $119.5 million for the state of Iowa, representing nearly 2% of the state's total revenue. $89.1 million of that amount was gross profit from the direct sale of alcohol in Iowa, whereas liquor license fees brought in $14.7 million, the excise taxes on beer and wine brought in $13.9 million and $7.7 million respectively.

The Division facility is located in Ankeny. The Division has four bureaus: Administration, Financial Management, Spirits Distribution and Regulatory Affairs. It has 80 full-time employees.

A reorganization of the state's liquor control system took place in 1987, as 207 state retail liquor stores were closed, and 256 licensed private outlets replace them. As of July 1, 1987, 410 licensed private outlets sold liquor to retail customers and on-premises license holders, while the Division continued wholesaling liquor to the private stores.

On May 5, 2000, authority for tobacco enforcement was transferred to the Division, which created the Iowa Pledge Tobacco Education and Enforcement Program.

In 2013, the Division sold more than 4.95 million gallons of liquor, worth a total of $256 million.
