= District of Columbia Alcoholic Beverage and Cannabis Administration =

Alcoholic Beverage and Cannabis Administration
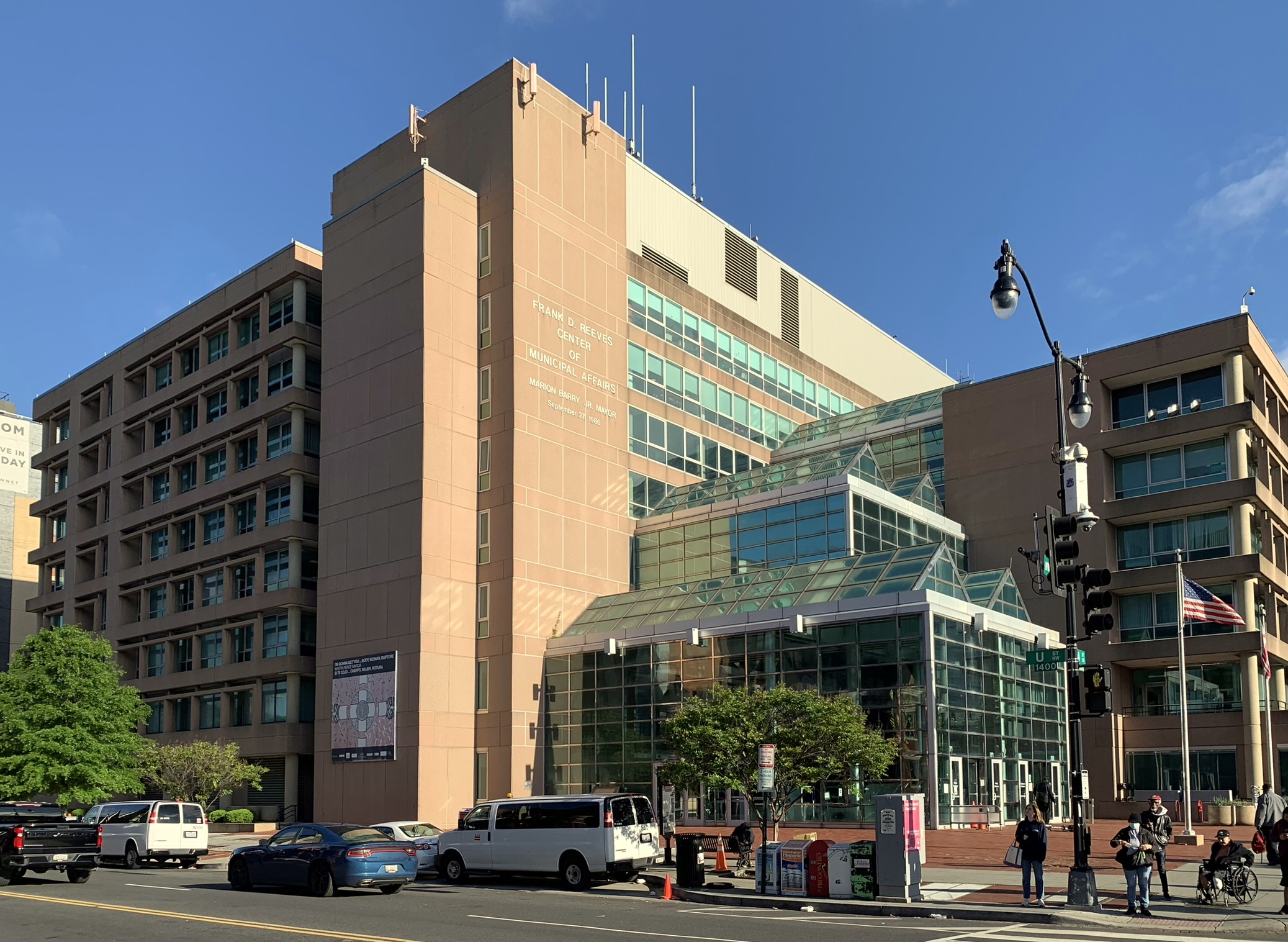
- The Alcoholic Beverage and Cannabis Administration is headquartered in the Frank D. Reeves Municipal Center

Department overview
- Jurisdiction: District of Columbia
- Headquarters: Frank D. Reeves Center of Municipal Affairs; 38.917538°N 77.032505°W
- Department executive: Fred Moosally, Director
- Website: abca.dc.gov

The Alcoholic Beverage and Cannabis Administration (ABCA) is an independent adjudicatory body of the District of Columbia, in the United States. It was formerly known by other names, including Alcoholic Beverage Control Board and Alcoholic Beverage Regulation Administration.

Under Title 25 of the D.C. Official Code, the entity is responsible for overseeing the District's regulatory authority for alcoholic beverage and cannabis, including hiring its director, conducting investigations, the licensing process, handling complaints, keeping of records, and referral of evidence of criminal misconduct to the proper authorities. As of July 2024, the director is Fred Moosally. An ABCA board is composed of seven members, appointed by the Mayor of the District of Columbia and confirmed by the Council of the District of Columbia; their terms are for four years.
