= Alcoholic beverage control state =

States in the United States that have a monopoly over alcohol

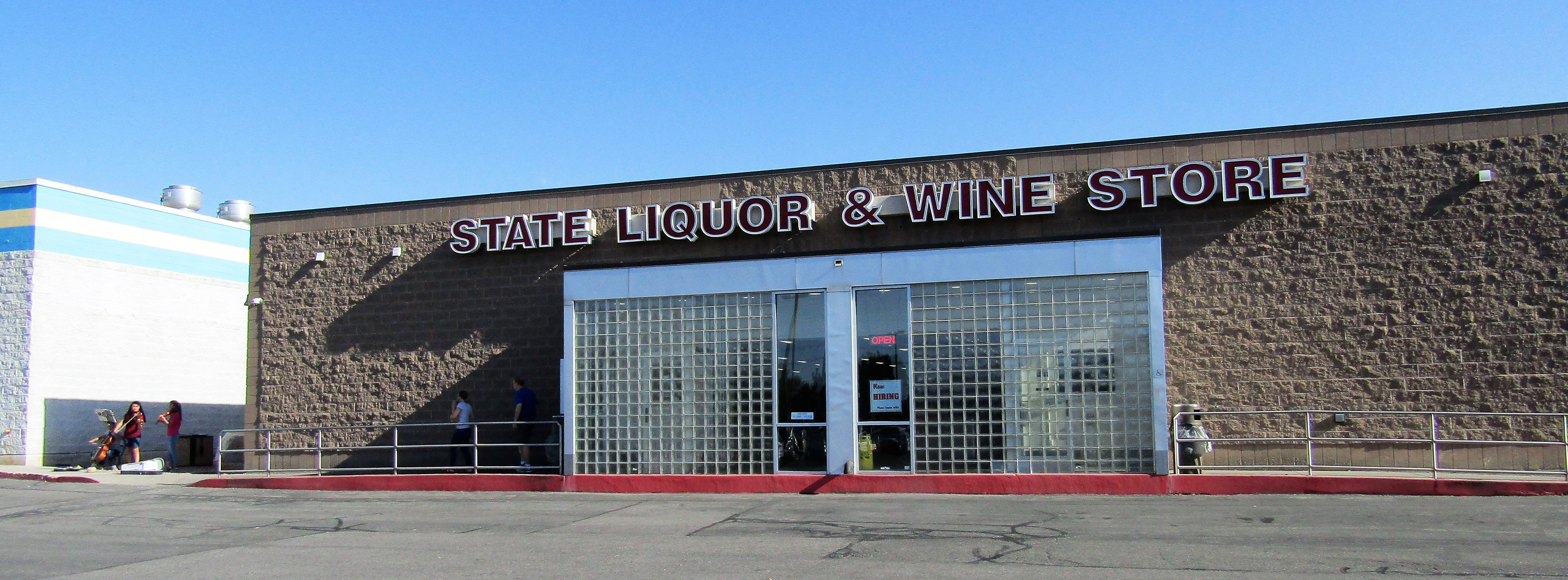
A state-operated liquor and wine store in Utah

Alcoholic beverage control states, generally called control states, less often ABC states, are 17 states in the United States that have state monopolies over the wholesaling or retailing of some or all categories of alcoholic beverages, such as beer, wine, and distilled spirits.

== History ==
At the beginning of the temperance movement in the United States, many states controlled where and when alcohol could be sold. Before this time, most alcoholic beverages for off-premises consumption were often sold just like any other item of commerce in stores or bars. Because of heavy lobbying by temperance groups in various states, most required off-premises beverages to be sold in dedicated stores (primarily called dispensaries) with controls over their location. To further enhance oversight of beverage sales, some states such as South Carolina operated state-run dispensaries. A national prohibition began in January 1920, following ratification of the Eighteenth Amendment in January 1919.

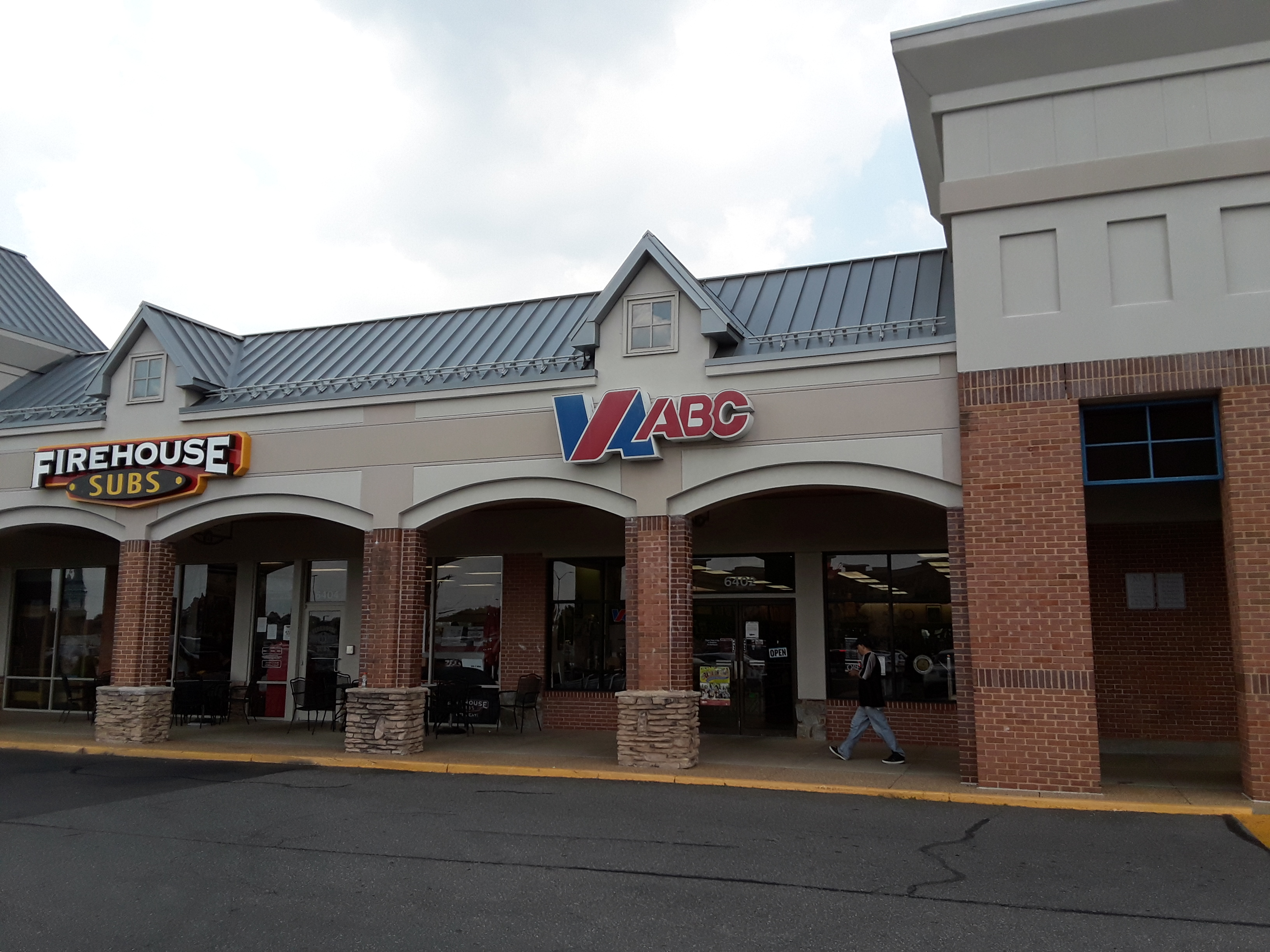
ABC store in Springfield, Virginia

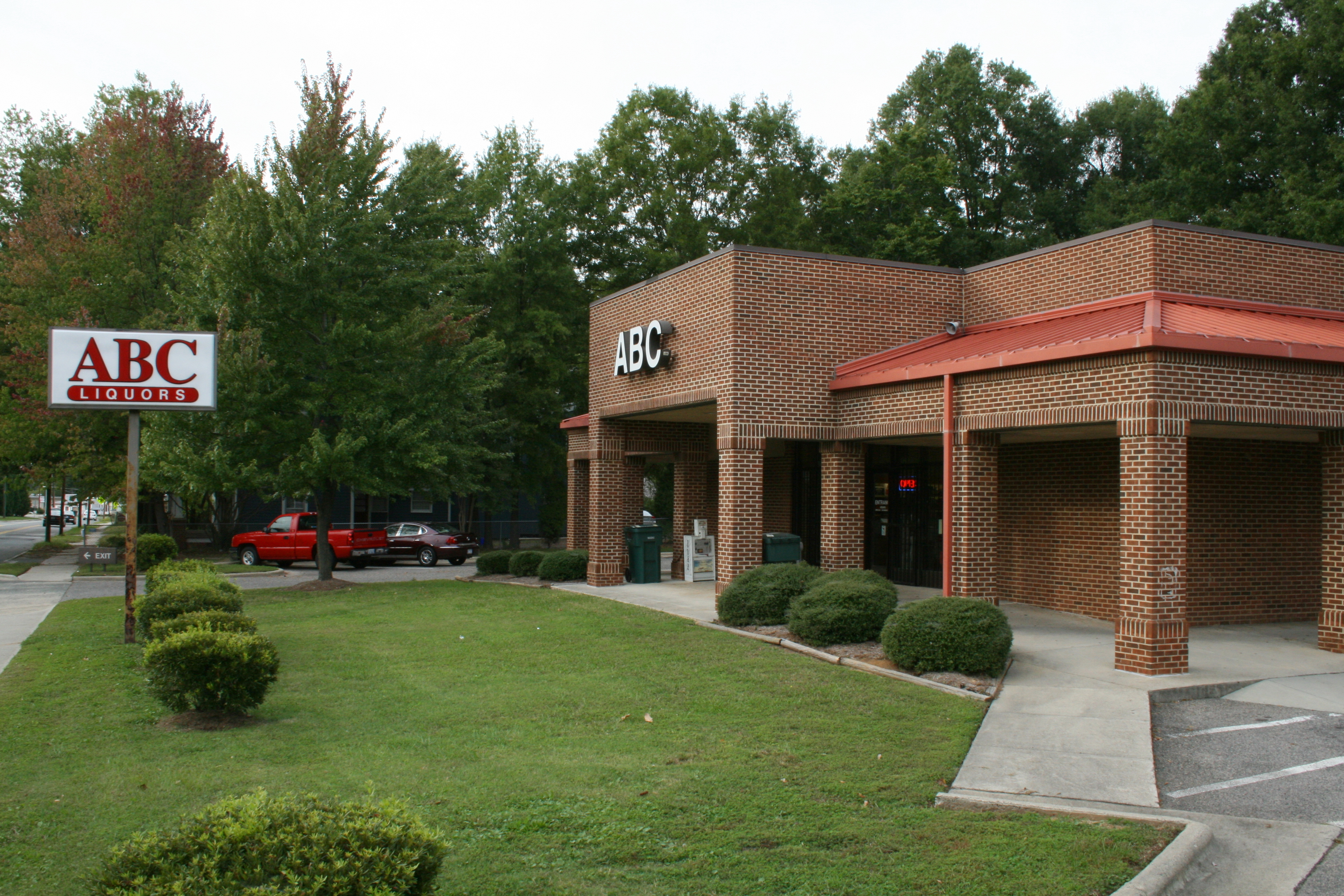
ABC store in Durham, North Carolina

Following ratification of the Twenty-first Amendment in 1933, resulting in the end of national prohibition, some states initially decided to continue their own prohibition against the production, distribution, and sale of alcoholic beverages within their borders. Other states decided to leave the issue to local jurisdictions, including counties and cities, a practice called local option.

States were also able to restrict the importation of "intoxicating liquors" into their territory under the provisions of the Twenty-first Amendment, which, while ending the Federal role in alcohol control, exempted liquor from the constitutional rule reserving the regulation of interstate commerce to the federal government. Thus, states that wished to continue prohibition could do so.

Among those states which chose not to maintain complete prohibition over alcoholic beverages, approximately one-third established government monopolies while the remaining two-thirds established private license systems. In its simplest terms, the license system allows private enterprises to buy and sell alcohol at state discretion. In actual effect, the license operates as a device of restraint and not merely a grant of privilege or freedom. In a constitutional sense, the license confers no property right and the exercise of its privilege is continuously contingent upon the holder's compliance with required conditions and the general discretion of the licensing authority.

The remaining states adopted the monopoly system of regulation, the more cautious of the two regulatory frameworks. As alluded to above, under the monopoly plan the government takes over the wholesale trade and conducts the retail sale of heavier alcoholic beverages through its own stores. That is, the state itself engages in the sale and distribution of alcoholic beverages. Most of these states have an Alcoholic Beverage Control (ABC) board—exact naming varies by state—and run liquor stores called "ABC stores" or "state stores". In all monopoly states, a parallel license system is used to regulate the sale and distribution of lighter alcoholic beverages such as beer and wine.

Beginning in the 1960s onward, many control states loosened their monopoly of beverage sales. States like West Virginia and Washington sold all of their state liquor stores to private owners, while others like Vermont permit private store owners to sell alcohol on behalf of the state for a commission.

== State listing ==
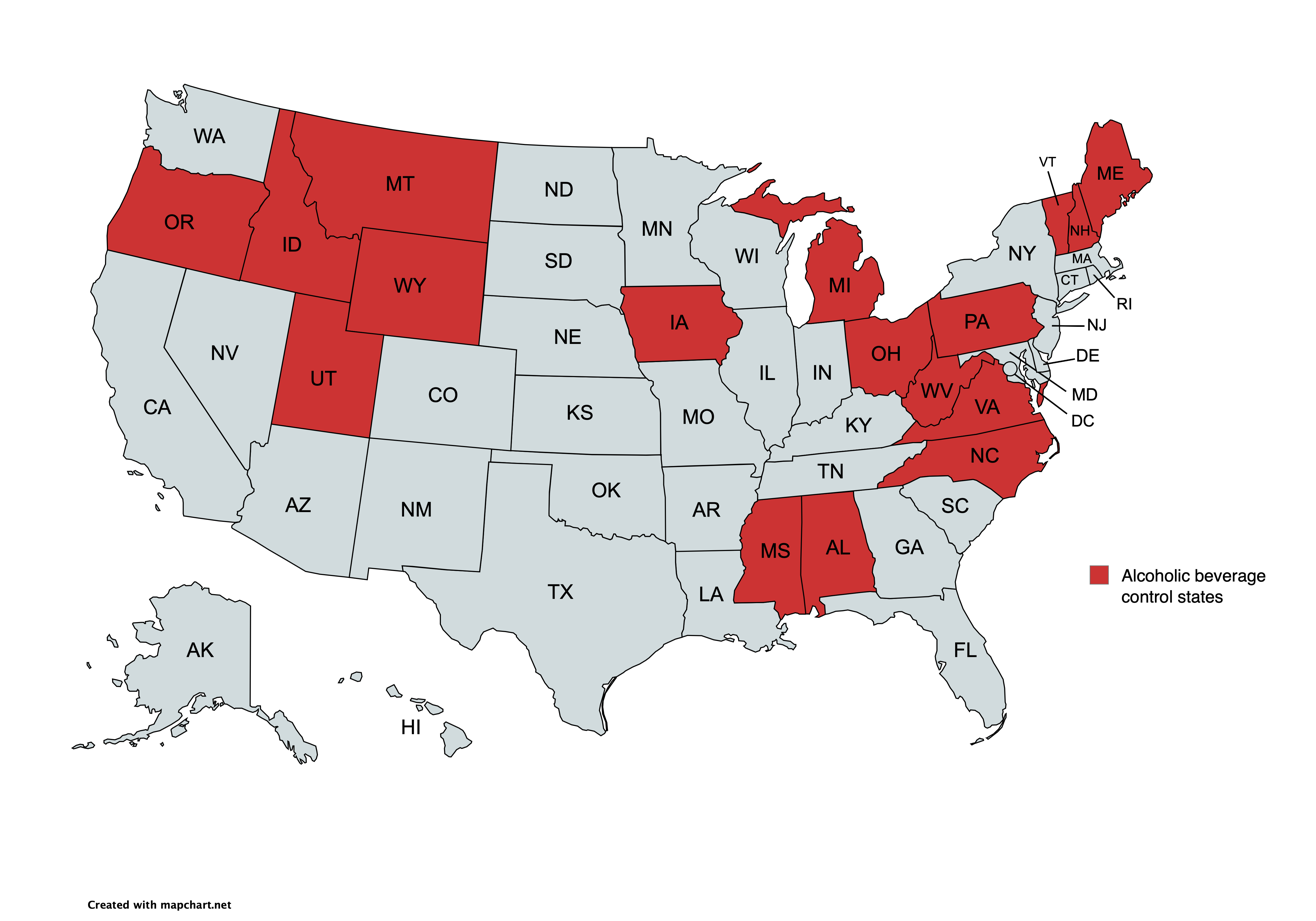
Map showing alcoholic beverage control states in the United States

The 17 control or monopoly states as of November 2019 are:

1. Alabama – Liquor stores are state-run or on-premises establishments with a special off-premises license, per the provisions of Title 28, Code of Ala. 1975, carried out by the Alabama Alcoholic Beverage Control Board.
2. Idaho – Maintains a monopoly over sales of beverages with greater than 16% ABV.
3. Iowa – All spirits are sold to privately owned retailers by the Iowa Alcoholic Beverages Division. Beer and wine can be sold by private license-holders.
4. Maine – Manages spirits and licenses private retail businesses such as grocery and convenience stores. It also wholesales to businesses, setting the retail and wholesale prices, and approves all spirits products sold in the state. Beer and wine are distributed and sold through the private sector.
5. Michigan – Does not operate retail outlets, but maintains a monopoly over wholesaling of distilled spirits only.
6. Mississippi – The Mississippi Office of Alcoholic Beverage Control (MS ABC) is tasked with regulating the legal and responsible dispensing of wines and spirits within Mississippi. Spirits below 7.5% ABV, wines below 6.25% ABV, and all beer products are distributed by privately owned companies. All retailers operating in Mississippi are privately owned and licensed by the state. Wines and spirits distributed by MS ABC can be sold at licensed off-premise accounts (liquor stores) and on-premise accounts (restaurants, bars, clubs, casinos, etc.). Beer, light-wine, and light-spirit products may be sold in groceries, convenience stores, and on-premise accounts but not in liquor stores.
7. Montana – State-contracted Agency Liquor Stores may also sell wine, mixed alcoholic beverages in the can (ready to drink-RTD) with spirits, along with businesses (bars and restaurants) that have been issued an annual license to sell. Privileges (such as sales for carryout or for consumption on the premises) and hours during which sales are allowed are dependent on the privileges of the license type. Beer and wine may be sold at supermarkets and convenience stores.
8. New Hampshire – Beer and wine can be sold at supermarkets and convenience stores. Liquor is sold only in state-run liquor stores and a small number of stores with a private Liquor Agency License.
9. North Carolina – Beer and wine can be sold in supermarkets and convenience stores. Other spirits must be sold in liquor stores owned by local ABC boards. The State ABC Commission controls wholesale distribution and oversees local ABC boards. Prices for bottles of liquor are specified by the North Carolina ABC Commission and are the same throughout the state. The price list is updated quarterly. Sales on certain liquors are held monthly, and all ABC outlets in the state use the same special pricing. Holiday or gift packages, typically released by distillers around Thanksgiving and Christmas, are sold at the same price as standard bottles of the enclosed liquor, regardless of the included accessories (flasks, rocks glasses, shot glasses, cocktail shakers, etc.)
10. Ohio – Contracts with private businesses to sell spirituous liquor (intoxicating liquor containing more than 21 percent alcohol by volume) on consignment. Contract Liquor Agencies may also sell beer, wine, mixed alcoholic beverages, and "low proof" alcohol, along with businesses (bars, restaurants, convenience stores, and gasoline/convenience store retailers) that have been issued an annual permit to sell. Privileges (such as sale for carryout only, or for consumption on the premises) and hours during which sales are allowed are dependent on the terms of the permit.
11. Oregon – Beer and wine can be sold in supermarkets and convenience stores. Other spirits must be sold in liquor stores operated and managed by state-appointed liquor agents who act as independent contractors under the supervision of the Oregon Liquor and Cannabis Commission.
12. Pennsylvania – All spirits are sold in Pennsylvania Liquor Control Board stores, known since the early 2010s as "Fine Wine & Good Spirits" (and, earlier, and still colloquially, as "State Stores"), which also sell other alcoholic beverages. Up to 3 litres (0.8 US gal) of wine may be purchased from hotel and restaurant licensees that obtain a permit allowing the sale of wine to-go. Malt beverages are sold in case lots by licensed beer retailers known as distributors, and in smaller quantities by licensed grocery stores, convenience stores, and on-premises establishments. The number of licenses to serve alcohol (including beer and wine) in restaurants is limited based on county populations.
13. Utah – All beverages over 4.0% ABW (5.0% ABV) are sold in state-run stores.
14. Vermont – Liquor stores are state-contracted and licensed.
15. Virginia – All distilled spirits are sold at state-run Virginia Alcoholic Beverage Control locations, commonly known as Virginia ABC stores. Virginia has ten "moist" counties that prohibit the sale of distilled spirits and thus do not have any ABC stores. Beer and wine are sold at licensed supermarkets and convenience stores. ABC stores also carry a small amount of local wine.
16. West Virginia – Does not operate retail outlets, but maintains a monopoly over wholesaling of distilled spirits only.
17. Wyoming – Does not operate retail outlets. Maintains monopoly on wholesale importation. Although licenses are issued by local licensing authorities, all liquor licenses must be approved by the state, and licenses are limited by population density.

=== Notes ===
About one-quarter of the United States population lives in control states.

Maryland as a whole is not a control state. Private liquor stores sell beer, wine, and spirits in most of the state, but under state law, Montgomery County uses a control model, operating 25 off-premise beer, wine, and liquor stores. These county stores are the only off-premise spirits outlets; however, beer and wine only stores are privately owned. Four grocery chain stores in the county have grandfathered alcohol licenses. The regulatory agency is Montgomery County Alcohol Beverage Services (ABS). Harford County had a system of county-run liquor dispensaries until a 1979 state law's abolition of the system was approved by a local referendum and took effect on September 1, 1981.Dorchester County was an alcohol control county until 2008, when the County Council voted to permanently close the county-owned liquor dispensaries, with subsequent change in the state law. Worcester County was an alcohol control county until July 2014, when the Maryland General Assembly abolished the Liquor Control Board by statute, replacing it with the Department of Liquor Control.

In Minnesota, a city with a population of 10,000 or less may choose to open a municipal liquor store while prohibiting private liquor stores. The city may maintain this monopoly even if its population grows. As of 2018, 190 cities in the state operate their own stores.

In California, the state constitution prohibits the state or any agency thereof from becoming a manufacturer or seller of alcoholic beverages.

== See also ==
- Alcohol laws of the United States by state
- Alcohol monopoly
- Three-tier system (alcohol distribution)
- Dry county
- Dry state
- Public department store
- Public grocery store
- Category:State alcohol agencies of the United States
