= Australian Broadcasting Control Board =

Former Australian government agency

The Australian Broadcasting Control Board was an Australian government agency formed in 1949 whose main roles were to regulate commercial radio and television broadcasting. It was also the introducer and regulator for FM broadcasting.

The agency held public hearings, issued commercial broadcasting licenses, and performed the technical planning for the national and commercial broadcasting networks. The Postmaster-General's Department was responsible for the engineering functions for the national transmitter facilities. Commercial broadcasters were responsible for their own construction and installation.

The Australian Broadcasting Tribunal took over the functions of the Australian Broadcasting Control Board in the 1970s.

The engineering function in some cases was handled by the National Transmission Authority, when the Postmaster-General's Department ceased being responsible for the national broadcasting service. The ABC always handled the studio section of the national network. The Australian Broadcasting Authority took over the functions of the Australian Broadcasting Tribunal.

On 1 July 2005, the Australian Broadcasting Authority and the Australian Communications Authority were merged to create a new agency, the Australian Communications and Media Authority.
