= AACTA Award for Best Film =

Australian film award

Best Film AACTA Award
- Awarded for: Best Australian film of the year
- Country: Australia
- Presented by: Australian Academy of Cinema and Television Arts (AACTA)
- First award: 1969
- Currently held by: Bring Her Back (2025)
- Website: www.aacta.org

The AACTA Award for Best Film is an award presented by the Australian Academy of Cinema and Television Arts (AACTA) at the annual AACTA Awards, which hand out accolades for achievements in feature film, television, documentaries, and short films. The inaugural award was presented in 1969 by the Australian Film Institute, becoming a competitive award in 1976. Since 2011 it has awarded by the Academy, established by the AFI in 2010.

From 2016 until 2020, the category adopted the name of its sponsor, Foxtel, as category name, being called AACTA Award for Best Film Presented by Foxtel.

== History ==
From 1969 to 2010, the category was presented by the Australian Film Institute (AFI), the Academy's parent organisation, at the annual Australian Film Institute Awards (known as the AFI Awards). When the AFI launched the Academy in 2011, it changed the annual ceremony to the AACTA Awards, with the current award being a continuum of the AFI Award for Best Film. From 2016 until 2020 it was named after its sponsor, and named "AACTA Award for Best Film Presented by Foxtel".

From 1969 to 1975, the award was presented as a gold, silver, bronze or grand prix prize, or in some years, a cash prize.

The first winner, Jack and Jill: A Postscript, was nominated in the "general" category of the 1969 awards, and received a silver prize. Because non-feature films dominated the Australian film industry at that time, the film was submitted in the general category. Despite this, it is considered the first winner by the Academy. From the 1976 Australian Film Awards, the award became competitive, and has been given as such since then.

== Eligibility ==
To be eligible, the film must be Australian; consist of a dramatised story of at least 70 minutes duration; and be publicly exhibited in a commercial cinema for a minimum of seven consecutive days, in at least two capital cities (one of which is Sydney or Melbourne). The producer of the film is considered the nominee, and is presented the award upon winning.

== Description ==
The AACTA Award for Best film is presented by AACTA, a non-profit organisation whose aim is to "identify, award, promote, and celebrate Australia's greatest achievements in film and television". The award is presented at the annual AACTA Awards, which hand out accolades for achievements in feature film, television, documentaries and short films.

== Winners and nominees ==
In the following table, the years listed correspond to the year of film release; the ceremonies are usually held the same year.^{[A]} Films in bold and in dark blue background have received a gold, silver, bronze or grand prix prize, or a cash prize; those in bold and in yellow background have won a regular competitive award. Films that are neither highlighted nor in bold are the nominees. When sorted chronologically, the table always lists the winning film first and then the other nominees.

Winner of a gold, silver or bronze prize (1969–1975)
Winner of a competitive award (1976–present)

Year	Film	Producer(s)
**AFI Awards**
**1960s**
**1969** (11th)	**Jack and Jill: A Postscript**^{[B]}	**Phillip Adams and Brian Robinson**
**1970s**
**1970** (12th)	**Three to Go: Michael**^{[C]}	**Gil Brealey**
**1971** (13th)	**Homesdale**^{[D]}	**Grahame Bond and Richard Brennan**
**1972** (14th)	**Stork**^{[E]}	**Tim Burstall**
**1973** (15th)	**27A**^{[F]}	**Haydn Keenan**
**1973** (15th)	**Libido: The Child**^{[F]}	**Christopher Muir and John B. Murray**
**1974–75** (16th and 17th)
**1974–75** (16th and 17th)	**Sunday Too Far Away**^{[G]}	**Gil Brealey and Matt Carroll**
**1974–75** (16th and 17th)	Petersen^{[H]}	Tim Burstall
**1974–75** (16th and 17th)	Between Wars^{[H]}	Michael Thornhill
**1976** (18th)
**1976** (18th)	**The Devil's Playground**	**Fred Schepisi**
**1976** (18th)	Caddie	Anthony Buckley
**1976** (18th)	Picnic at Hanging Rock	Hal and Jim McElroy
**1976** (18th)	Pure Shit	Bob Weis
**1977** (19th)
**1977** (19th)	**Storm Boy**	**Matt Carroll**
**1977** (19th)	Break of Day	Patricia Lovell
**1977** (19th)	Don's Party	Phillip Adams
**1977** (19th)	The Picture Show Man	Joan Long
**1978** (20th)
**1978** (20th)	**Newsfront**	**David Elfick**
**1978** (20th)	The Chant of Jimmie Blacksmith	Fred Schepisi
**1978** (20th)	Mouth to Mouth	John Duigan and Jon Sainken
**1978** (20th)	Patrick	Richard Franklin and Antony I. Ginnane
**1979** (21st)
**1979** (21st)	**My Brilliant Career**	**Margaret Fink**
**1979** (21st)	Cathy's Child	Pom Oliver and Errol Sullivan
**1979** (21st)	In Search of Anna	Esben Storm
**1979** (21st)	Mad Max	Byron Kennedy
**1980s**
**1980** (22nd)
**1980** (22nd)	**Breaker Morant**	**Matt Carroll**
**1980** (22nd)	Manganinnie	Gilda Baracchi
**1980** (22nd)	...Maybe This Time	Brian Kavanagh
**1980** (22nd)	Stir	Richard Brennan
**1981** (23rd)
**1981** (23rd)	**Gallipoli**	**Patricia Lovell and Robert Stigwood**
**1981** (23rd)	The Club	Matt Carroll
**1981** (23rd)	Winter of Our Dreams	Richard Mason
**1981** (23rd)	Wrong Side of the Road	Graeme Isaac and Ned Lander
**1982** (24th)
**1982** (24th)	**Lonely Hearts**	**John B. Murray**
**1982** (24th)	Goodbye Paradise	Jane Scott
**1982** (24th)	Monkey Grip	Patricia Lovell
**1982** (24th)	We of the Never Never	Greg Tepper and John B. Murray
**1983** (25th)
**1983** (25th)	**Careful, He Might Hear You**	**Jill Robb**
**1983** (25th)	Man of Flowers	Jane Ballantyne and Paul Cox
**1983** (25th)	Phar Lap	John Sexton
**1983** (25th)	The Year of Living Dangerously	Jim McElroy
**1984** (26th)
**1984** (26th)	**Annie's Coming Out**	**Don Murray**
**1984** (26th)	My First Wife	Jane Ballantyne and Paul Cox
**1984** (26th)	Silver City	Joan Long
**1984** (26th)	Strikebound	Miranda Bain, Richard Lowenstein and Timothy White
**1985** (27th)
**1985** (27th)	**Bliss**	**Anthony Buckley**
**1985** (27th)	Fran	David Rapsey
**1985** (27th)	A Street to Die	Bill Bennett
**1985** (27th)	Unfinished Business	Rebel Penfold-Russell
**1986** (28th)
**1986** (28th)	**Malcolm**	**Nadia Tass and David Parker**
**1986** (28th)	The Fringe Dwellers	Sue Milliken
**1986** (28th)	The More Things Change...	Jill Robb
**1986** (28th)	Short Changed	Ross Matthews
**1987** (29th)
**1987** (29th)	**The Year My Voice Broke**	**Terry Hayes, George Miller and Doug Mitchell**
**1987** (29th)	Ground Zero	Michael Pattinson
**1987** (29th)	High Tide	Sandra Levy
**1987** (29th)	The Tale of Ruby Rose	Bryce Menzies and Andrew Wiseman
**1988** (30th)
**1988** (30th)	**The Navigator: A Medieval Odyssey**	**David Elfick**
**1988** (30th)	Boulevard of Broken Dreams	Frank Howson
**1988** (30th)	Grievous Bodily Harm	Richard Brennan
**1988** (30th)	Mull	D. Howard Grigsby
**1989** (31st)
**1989** (31st)	**Evil Angels**	**Verity Lambert**
**1989** (31st)	Dead Calm	Terry Hayes, George Miller and Doug Mitchell
**1989** (31st)	Ghosts... of the Civil Dead	Evan English
**1989** (31st)	Island	Paul Cox and Santhana K. Naidu
**1990s**
**1990** (32nd)
**1990** (32nd)	**Flirting**	**Terry Hayes, George Miller and Doug Mitchell**
**1990** (32nd)	The Big Steal	Nadia Tass and David Parker
**1990** (32nd)	Blood Oath	Charles Waterstreet and Denis Whitburn
**1990** (32nd)	Struck by Lightning	Terry J. Charatsis and Trevor Farrant
**1991** (33rd)
**1991** (33rd)	**Proof**	**Lynda House**
**1991** (33rd)	Death in Brunswick	Timothy White
**1991** (33rd)	Dingo	Rolf de Heer, Giorgio Draskovic, Marie-Pascale Osterrieth and Marc Rosenberg
**1991** (33rd)	Spotswood	Richard Brennan and Timothy White
**1992** (34th)
**1992** (34th)	**Strictly Ballroom**	**Tristram Miall**
**1992** (34th)	Black Robe	Robert Lantos, Sue Milliken and Stéphane Reichel
**1992** (34th)	The Last Days of Chez Nous	Jan Chapman
**1992** (34th)	Romper Stomper	Ian Pringle and Daniel Scharf
**1993** (35th)
**1993** (35th)	**The Piano**	**Jan Chapman**
**1993** (35th)	The Heartbreak Kid	Ben Gannon
**1993** (35th)	Map of the Human Heart	Tim Bevan and Vincent Ward
**1993** (35th)	On My Own	Leo Pescarolo and Elisa Resegotti
**1994** (36th)
**1994** (36th)	**Muriel's Wedding**	**Lynda House and Jocelyn Moorhouse**
**1994** (36th)	The Adventures of Priscilla, Queen of the Desert	Al Clark and Michael Hamlyn
**1994** (36th)	Bad Boy Bubby	Rolf de Heer, Domenico Procacci and Giorgio Draskovic
**1994** (36th)	The Sum of Us	Hal McElroy
**1995** (37th)
**1995** (37th)	**Angel Baby**	**Jonathan Shteinman and Timothy White**
**1995** (37th)	All Men Are Liars	John Maynard
**1995** (37th)	Hotel Sorrento	Richard Franklin and Peter Fitzpatrick
**1995** (37th)	That Eye, the Sky	Hal McElroy
**1996** (37th)
**1996** (37th)	**Shine**	**Jane Scott**
**1996** (37th)	Children of the Revolution	Tristram Miall
**1996** (37th)	Love and Other Catastrophes	Helen Bandis, Stavros Kazantzidis and Yael Bergman
**1996** (37th)	Mr. Reliable	Hal McElroy
**1997** (39th)
**1997** (39th)	**Kiss or Kill**	**Bill Bennett**
**1997** (39th)	Blackrock	David Elfick, Rick Enright and Melanie Ritchie
**1997** (39th)	Doing Time for Patsy Cline	Chris Kennedy
**1997** (39th)	The Well	Sandra Levy
**1998** (40th)
**1998** (40th)	**The Interview**	**Bill Hughes**
**1998** (40th)	The Boys	Robert Connolly and John Maynard
**1998** (40th)	Head On	Jane Scott
**1998** (40th)	Radiance	Ned Lander and Andy Myer
**1999** (41st)
**1999** (41st)	**Two Hands**	**Marian Macgowan**
**1999** (41st)	Praise	Martha Coleman
**1999** (41st)	Siam Sunset	Max Dann and Andrew Knight
**1999** (41st)	Soft Fruit	Helen Bowden
**2000s**
**2000** (42nd)
**2000** (42nd)	**Looking for Alibrandi**	**Robyn Kershaw**
**2000** (42nd)	Better Than Sex	Frank Cox and Bruna Papandrea
**2000** (42nd)	Bootmen	Hilary Linstead
**2000** (42nd)	Chopper	Michele Bennett
**2001** (43rd)
**2001** (43rd)	**Lantana**	**Jan Chapman**
**2001** (43rd)	The Bank	John Maynard
**2001** (43rd)	The Dish	Santo Cilauro, Tom Gleisner, Michael Hirsh, Jane Kennedy and Rob Sitch
**2001** (43rd)	Moulin Rouge!	Baz Luhrmann, Fred Baron and Martin Brown
**2002** (44th)
**2002** (44th)	**Rabbit-Proof Fence**	**Phillip Noyce, Christine Olsen and John Winter**
**2002** (44th)	Australian Rules	Mark Lazarus
**2002** (44th)	Beneath Clouds	Teresa-Jayne Hanlon
**2002** (44th)	The Tracker	Julie Ryan and Rolf de Heer
**2003** (45th)
**2003** (45th)	**Japanese Story**	**Sue Maslin**
**2003** (45th)	Alexandra's Project	Rolf de Heer and Antonio Zeccola
**2003** (45th)	Gettin' Square	Martin Fabinyi, Timothy White and Trisha Lake
**2003** (45th)	The Rage in Placid Lake	Marian McGowan
**2004** (46th)
**2004** (46th)	**Somersault**	**Anthony Anderson**
**2004** (46th)	Love's Brother	Jane Scott
**2004** (46th)	The Old Man Who Read Love Stories	Julie Ryan
**2004** (46th)	Tom White	Daniel Scharf
**2005** (47th)
**2005** (47th)	**Look Both Ways**	**Bridget Ikin, Barbara Masel and Andrew Myer**
**2005** (47th)	Little Fish	Robert Mullis, Devesh Chetty and Kirk D'amico
**2005** (47th)	Oyster Farmer	Anthony Buckley and Piers Tempest
**2005** (47th)	The Proposition	Chris Brown, Jackie O'Sullivan, Chiara Menage and Cat Villiers
**2006** (48th)
**2006** (48th)	**Ten Canoes**	**Rolf de Heer and Julie Ryan**
**2006** (48th)	Candy	Margaret Fink and Emile Sherman
**2006** (48th)	Jindabyne	Philippa Bateman, Garry Charny and Catherine Jarman
**2006** (48th)	Kenny	Clayton Jacobson and Rohan Timlock
**2007** (49th)
**2007** (49th)	**Romulus, My Father**	**Robert Connolly and John Maynard**
**2007** (49th)	The Home Song Stories	Michael McMahon and Liz Watts
**2007** (49th)	Lucky Miles	Jo Dyer and Lesley Dyer
**2007** (49th)	Noise	Trevor Blainey
**2008** (50th)
**2008** (50th)	**The Black Balloon**	**Tristram Miall**
**2008** (50th)	The Jammed	Dee McLachlan and Andrea Buck
**2008** (50th)	The Square	Louise Smith
**2008** (50th)	Unfinished Sky	Cathy Overett and Anton Smit
**2009** (51st)
**2009** (51st)	**Samson and Delilah**	**Kath Shelper**
**2009** (51st)	Balibo	Anthony LaPaglia, John Maynard, Dominic Purcell and Rebecca Williamson
**2009** (51st)	Beautiful Kate	Bryan Brown, Leah Churchill-Brown
**2009** (51st)	Blessed	Al Clark, Barbara Gibbs, Phil Hunt, Marian Macgowan and Compton Ross
**2009** (51st)	Mao's Last Dancer	Jane Scott
**2009** (51st)	Mary and Max	Melanie Coombs
**2010s**
**2010** (52nd)
**2010** (52nd)	**Animal Kingdom**	**Liz Watts**
**2010** (52nd)	Beneath Hill 60	Bill Leimbach
**2010** (52nd)	Bran Nue Dae	Robyn Kershaw and Graeme Isaac
**2010** (52nd)	Bright Star	Jan Chapman and Caroline Hewitt
**2010** (52nd)	Tomorrow, When the War Began	Andrew Mason and Michael Boughen
**2010** (52nd)	The Tree	Sue Taylor and Yael Fogiel
**AACTA Awards**
**2011** (1st)
**2011** (1st)	**Red Dog**	**Nelson Woss and Julie Ryan**
**2011** (1st)	The Eye of the Storm	Antony Waddington, Gregory J. Read and Fred Schepisi
**2011** (1st)	The Hunter	Vincent Sheehan
**2011** (1st)	Mad Bastards	David Jowsey, Alan Pigram, Stephen Pigram and Brendan Fletcher
**2011** (1st)	Oranges and Sunshine	Camilla Bray, Emile Sherman and Iain Canning
**2011** (1st)	Snowtown	Anna McLeish and Sarah Shaw
**2012** (2nd)
**2012** (2nd)	**The Sapphires**	**Rosemary Blight and Kylie du Fresne**
**2012** (2nd)	Burning Man	Andy Paterson and Jonathan Teplitzky
**2012** (2nd)	Lore	Karsten Stöter, Liz Watts, Paul Welsh and Benny Drechsel
**2012** (2nd)	Wish You Were Here	Angie Fielder
**2013** (3rd)
**2013** (3rd)	**The Great Gatsby**	**Baz Luhrmann, Catherine Martin, Douglas Wick, Lucy Fisher and Catherine Knapman**
**2013** (3rd)	Dead Europe	Emile Sherman, Iain Canning and Liz Watts
**2013** (3rd)	Mystery Road	David Jowsey
**2013** (3rd)	The Rocket	Sylvia Wilczynski
**2013** (3rd)	Satellite Boy	David Jowsey, Julie Ryan and Catriona McKenzie
**2013** (3rd)	The Turning	Robert Connolly, Maggie Miles and The Turning Ensemble
**2014** (4th)
**2014** (4th)	**The Babadook**	**Kristina Ceyton and Kristian Molière**
**2014** (4th)	**The Water Diviner**	**Andrew Mason, Troy Lum and Keith Rodger**
**2014** (4th)	Charlie's Country	Nils Erik Nielsen, Peter Djigirr and Rolf de Heer
**2014** (4th)	Predestination	Paddy McDonald, Tim McGahan, Peter Spierig and Michael Spierig
**2014** (4th)	The Railway Man	Chris Brown, Andy Paterson and Bill Curbishley
**2014** (4th)	Tracks	Emile Sherman and Iain Canning
**2015** (5th)
**2015** (5th)	**Mad Max: Fury Road**	**Doug Mitchell, P. J. Voeten and George Miller**
**2015** (5th)	The Dressmaker	Sue Maslin
**2015** (5th)	Holding the Man	Kylie du Fresne
**2015** (5th)	Last Cab to Darwin	Greg Duffy, Lisa Duff and Jeremy Sims
**2015** (5th)	Paper Planes	Robert Connolly, Maggie Miles and Liz Kearney
**2016** (6th)
**2016** (6th)	**Hacksaw Ridge**	**Bill Mechanic, David Permut, Paul Currie and Bruce Davey**
**2016** (6th)	The Daughter	Jan Chapman and Nicole O’Donohue
**2016** (6th)	Girl Asleep	Jo Dyer
**2016** (6th)	Goldstone	David Jowsey and Greer Simpkin
**2016** (6th)	Tanna	Martin Butler, Bentley Dean and Carolyn Johnson
**2017** (7th)
**2017** (7th)	**Lion**	**Iain Canning, Angie Fielder and Emile Sherman**
**2017** (7th)	Ali's Wedding	Sheila Jayadev and Helen Panckhurst
**2017** (7th)	Berlin Syndrome	Polly Staniford
**2017** (7th)	Hounds of Love	Melissa Kelly
**2017** (7th)	Jasper Jones	David Jowsey and Vincent Sheehan
**2018** (8th)
**2018** (8th)	**Sweet Country**	**David Jowsey and Greer Simpkin**
**2018** (8th)	Boy Erased	Joel Edgerton, Steve Golin and Kerry Kohansky Roberts
**2018** (8th)	Breath	Simon Baker, Jamie Hilton and Mark Johnson
**2018** (8th)	Cargo	Russell Ackerman, Kristina Ceyton, Samantha Jennings and Mark Patterson
**2018** (8th)	Ladies in Black	Sue Milliken and Allanah Zitserman
**2019** (9th)
**2019** (9th)	**The Nightingale**	**Kristina Ceyton, Bruna Papandrea, Steve Hutensky and Jennifer Kent**
**2019** (9th)	Hotel Mumbai	Basil Iwanyk, Gary Hamilton, Julie Ryan and Jomon Thomas
**2019** (9th)	Judy and Punch	Michele Bennett, Nash Edgerton and Danny Gabai
**2019** (9th)	The King	Brad Pitt, Dede Gardner, Jeremy Kleiner, Liz Watts, David Michôd and Joel Edgerton
**2019** (9th)	Ride Like a Girl	Richard Keddie, Rachel Griffiths and Susie Montague
**2019** (9th)	Top End Wedding	Rosemary Blight, Kylie du Fresne and Kate Croser
**2020s**
**2020** (10th)
**2020** (10th)	**Babyteeth**	**Alex White**
**2020** (10th)	H is for Happiness	Julie Ryan, Tenille Kennedy and Lisa Hoppe
**2020** (10th)	I Am Woman	Rosemary Blight and Unjoo Moon
**2020** (10th)	The Invisible Man	Kylie du Fresne and Jason Blum
**2020** (10th)	Relic	Anna McLeish and Sarah Shaw
**2020** (10th)	True History of the Kelly Gang	Hal Vogel, Liz Watts, Justin Kurzel and Paul Ranford
**2021** (11th)
**2021** (11th)	**Nitram**	**Nick Batzias, Shaun Grant, Justin Kurzel and Virginia Whitwell**
**2021** (11th)	The Dry	Eric Bana, Robert Connolly, Steve Hutensky, Jodi Matterson and Bruna Papandrea
**2021** (11th)	The Furnace	Tenille Kennedy and Timothy White
**2021** (11th)	High Ground	Stephen Maxwell Johnson, David Jowsey, Witiyana Marika, Maggie Miles and Greer Simpkin
**2021** (11th)	Penguin Bloom	Emma Cooper, Steve Hutensky, Jodi Matterson, Bruna Papandrea and Naomi Watts
**2021** (11th)	Rams	Janelle Landers and Aidan O'Bryan
**2022** (12th)
**2022** (12th)	**Elvis**	**Baz Luhrmann, Catherine Martin, Gail Berman, Patrick McCormick and Schuyler Weiss**
**2022** (12th)	The Drover's Wife: The Legend of Molly Johnson	Bain Stewart, David Jowsey, Angela Littlejohn, Greer Simpkin and Leah Purcell
**2022** (12th)	Here Out West	Sheila Jayadev, Annabel Davis and Bree-Anne Sykes
**2022** (12th)	Sissy	Lisa Shaunessy, John De Margheriti, Jason Taylor and Bec Janek
**2022** (12th)	The Stranger	Rachel Gardner, Emile Sherman, Iain Canning, Joel Edgerton, Kerry Kohansky-Roberts and Kim Hodgert
**2022** (12th)	Three Thousand Years of Longing	Doug Mitchell and George Miller
**2023** (13th)
**2023** (13th)	**Talk to Me**	**Samantha Jennings and Kristina Ceyton**
**2023** (13th)	The New Boy	Kath Shelper, Andrew Upton, Cate Blanchett and Lorenzo de Maio
**2023** (13th)	Of an Age	Kristina Ceyton and Samantha Jennings
**2023** (13th)	The Royal Hotel	Liz Watts, Emile Sherman, Iain Canning and Kath Shelper
**2023** (13th)	Shayda	Vincent Sheehan and Noora Niasari
**2023** (13th)	Sweet As	Liz Kearney
**2024** (14th)
**2024** (14th)	**Better Man**	**Paul Currie, Michael Gracey, Coco Xiaolu Ma and Craig McMahon**
**2024** (14th)	Furiosa: A Mad Max Saga	Doug Mitchell and George Miller
**2024** (14th)	How to Make Gravy	Schuyler Weiss, Hamish Lewis, Nick Waterman, Meg Washington and Michael Brooks
**2024** (14th)	Late Night with the Devil	Mathew Govoni and Adam White
**2024** (14th)	Memoir of a Snail	Liz Kearney and Adam Elliot
**2024** (14th)	Runt	Jamie Hilton and Craig Silvey
**2025** (15th)
**2025** (15th)	**Bring Her Back**	**Samatha Jennings** **and Kristina Ceyton**
**2025** (15th)	Kangaroo	David Jowsey, Greer Simpkin, Angela Littlejohn, Rachel Clements and Trisha Morton-Thomas
**2025** (15th)	Lesbian Space Princess	Tom Phillips
**2025** (15th)	The Correspondent	Carmel Travers
**2025** (15th)	The Surfer	Leonara Darby, James Harris, Robert Connolly, James Grandison, Brunella Cocchiglia, Nathan Klingher and Nicolas Cage
**2025** (15th)	The Travellers	Michael Boughen, Matthew Street and Kelvin Munro

== Notes ==
A: From 1958–2010, the awards were held during the year of the films release. However, the 1974–75 awards was held in 1975 for films released in 1974 and 1975, and the first AACTA Awards were held in 2012 for films released in 2011.
B: Jack and Jill: A Postscript received a silver prize, and was nominated in the "general category" in 1969.
C: Three to Go: Michael received the Grand Prix award for the film in 1970.
D: Homesdale was the winner of the Grand Prix award in 1971, and was the last film to receive this prize.
E: Stork was awarded the Australian Film Development Corporation Award for the Best Fiction Film over 65 minutes, and was given a five-thousand dollar cash prize.
F^{1} ^{2} : Libido: The Child and 27A were joint recipients of the gold prize for fiction in 1973.
G: Sunday Too Far Away won the golden reel prize, and an additional A$5000, at the 1974–75 Awards.
H^{1} ^{2} : Although not considered to be nominees, Petersen and Between Wars won the silver and bronze prizes, respectively. They are not highlighted in dark blue, in order not to confuse the reader in regards to who the winner is, and in order of precedence gold was always the highest honour, followed by silver then bronze.
