= 1969 Australian Film Institute Awards =

Australian film awards ceremony in 1969

- Date: 2 December 1969
- Site: National Library Theatre; Canberra, Australian Capital Territory
- Hosted by: John Gorton

Highlights
- Best Film: Jack and Jill: A Postscript

The 1969 Australian Film Awards (known retroactively as the Australian Film Institute Awards) ceremony, presented by the Australian Film Institute (AFI), honoured the best feature and non-feature films of 1969, and took place on 2 December 1969 at National Library Theatre, in Canberra, Australian Capital Territory. Australian Prime Minister John Gorton hosted the ceremony. During the ceremony the Australian Film Institute presented two gold, nine silver and bronze prizes, four special awards and certificates for twelve honourable mentions.

Bullocky and The Die-Hard - The Legend of Lasseter's Lost Gold Reef both received gold prizes and Jack and Jill: A Postscript, which won a silver prize became the first feature film to ever win an award from the AFI.

When the Australian Film Institute established the Australian Academy of Cinema and Television Arts (AACTA) in 2011, the awards became known as the AACTA Awards.

== Ceremony ==
The ceremony was held on 2 December 1969, at the National Library Theatre, located in Canberra, Australian Capital Territory. It was hosted by the 19th Prime Minister of Australia, John Gorton. During the Ceremony Gorton made a speech, praising the Australian Film Institute (AFI) for "[...] conveying the more refined aspects of Australian life and for projecting an image of the nation as something other than 'avant-garde kangaroos or Ned Kelly's'". One hundred and fifty-four films were submitted for competition and the winning films were judged by a jury composed of film critics, Colin Bennett and Lindsey Browne, and film director David Bairstow. Of the submitted films, the jury noted that there was a "[...] continuing advance in professional competence across the spectrum of the 154 entries[...]" and that "Grand Prix material remains illusive in the competition - but perhaps not for long. Australian film talent is obviously gathering momentum."

== Winners ==
During the ceremony the Australian Film Institute handed out two Golden Reel awards, nine silver and bronze prizes and four special awards. Awards were given to films from eight categories which included documentaries, advertising, teaching, children's, public relations, experimental, travel and general. Recipients of the awards included Gil Brealey and Venture Films for their documentaries Bullocky and The Die-Hard Legend of Lasseter's Lost Golden Reef, which both received the Golden Reel prize. Silver prize winning film Jack and Jill: A Postscript was the first feature film to receive an award from the AFI, which went to Phillip Adams and Brian Robinson. It is also considered the first feature film to win in the Best Film category of the AACTA Awards. Special medallions were presented for technical achievements in optical effects, photography, editing and cinematography. Twelve films from the competition received a certificate of honourable mention.
Winners of the golden reel prize.
Winners of the silver prize.
Winners of the bronze prize.

=== Prizes ===
Jack and Jill: A Postscript is considered the first feature film to win an AFI award.

Category	Winners
Golden Reel Award	Bullocky – Gil Brealey (Documentary)
Golden Reel Award	The Die-Hard - The Legend of Lasseter's Lost Gold Reef – Venture Films (Documentary)
Silver Prize	Bar Room Brawl – Fontana Films (Advertising)
Silver Prize	Christian Television Association Day 1-Day 6 – Film House, Weatherhead and Stitt (Advertising)
Silver Prize	The Capricorn Contract – Film Centre (Public Relations)
Silver Prize	Dig A Million, Make A Million – Tom Haydon (Documentary)
Silver Prize	Jack and Jill: A Postscript – Phillip Adams, Brian Robinson (General)
Silver Prize	Lagged - The Story of a Convict – John and Henrietta Clark (Teaching)
Silver Prize	The Pictures That Moved – The Commonwealth Film Unit (General)
Silver Prize	The Theme of an Abstract – Adrian Heinze (General)
Silver Prize	Paradise in the Sun – John Gray (Travel)
Bronze Prize	After Proust (Experimental)
Bronze Prize	And Then There Was Glass (Public Relations)
Bronze Prize	Backdrop of a Play (Children's)
Bronze Prize	Bull Ant Warrior (Teaching)
Bronze Prize	The Hard Word (General)
Bronze Prize	The Echidna (Teaching)
Bronze Prize	New Technique (Advertising)
Bronze Prize	Sculpture Australia 69 (Documentary)
Bronze Prize	Walbiri Ritual at Gunadjari (Documentary)

=== Special awards ===
Category	Winners
Special Award for Optical Effects	* Popcorn
Silver Medallion for photography	* The Card Game
Bronze Medallion	* ... And So it Goes (for cinematography)
Bronze Medallion	* And Then There Was Glass (for editing)
Bronze Medallion	* The Hard Word (for cinematography)

=== Honourable mention ===
Category	Winners
Honourable mention	* Asian Assignment
Honourable mention	* Birth of a Monster
Honourable mention	* The Card Game
Honourable mention	* The Company of Officer Cadets
Honourable mention	* International Summer '68
Honourable mention	* Kleenex 200
Honourable mention	* Lenny
Honourable mention	* Living Gold
Honourable mention	* London Hats
Honourable mention	* The Mud Hut
Honourable mention	* New Lipton Jigglers
Honourable mention	* The World About Us-People Out of Time
