= Flashpoint (1972 film) =

- Directed by: Brian Hannant
- Written by: Brian Hannant; Harold Lander
- Produced by: Gil Brealey
- Starring: Serge Lazareff
- Cinematography: Kerry Brown
- Edited by: Wayne LeClos
- Production company: Film Australia
- Release date: 1972
- Running time: 56 minutes
- Country: Australia
- Language: English

Flashpoint is a 1972 Australian film.

== Plot ==
David moves to a mining town in northwest Australia. He befriends a veteran worked for the mining company, Foxy, and his wife Vicky. Vicky and David become friends, making Foxy jealous.

== Cast ==
- Serge Lazareff as David
- Wyn Roberts as Foxy
- Jan Kingsbury as Vicky
- Hu Pryce as Ben
- Kevin Leslie as Arthur
- Barry Donnelly as Andy
- Harry Lawrence as Jimmy
- Ben Gabriel as mine manager

== Production ==
Film Australia were inspired to make further drama productions following the success of Three to Go (1970). They originally planned to make two films with common characters and opening scenes about the separate experiences of a father and son – the father would be a tradesman cop gin with unemployment at middle age while the son faces a new job. The film about the father, written by Frank Moorhouse, was abandoned but the other film became Flashpoint.

Filming took place in the mining town of Newman approx 1200 km north of Perth in the Pilbara. Brian Hannant spent several weeks working among mining crews incognito, then developing a script with Frank Hardy and, later, British TV writer Harold Lander.

A subplot was written and shot where David had an affair with kindergarten teacher played by Kirrily Nolan. This was cut to keep the running time down.

== Release ==
The film was distributed widely through non-commercial libraries in Australia and screened on television in 1973.
