= Sunday in Melbourne =

- Produced by: Gil Brealey, Paul Olson
- Release date: 1958
- Running time: 22 min
- Country: Australia
- Language: English

Sunday in Melbourne is a 1958 Australian experimental documentary. It is a tongue-in-cheek look at a day in the life of the city of Melbourne. Sunday was chosen as that was the day the film makers had time off. It was filmed over a period of six months. The film won the 1958 Australian Film Institute Special Award for an Experimental Film.
