= Philip Hunt (disambiguation) =

Phil or Phil(l)ip Hunt may refer to:

- Phillip Hunt (born 1986), American football player
- Philip Hunt, politician
- Philip Hunt (priest) (1772–1838), English Anglican priest and antiquarian
- Phil Hunt (1884–1946), Australian rules footballer
