= Bullocky (film) =

Bullocky is a 1969 Australian short documentary film, in colour. It was directed by Richard Mitchell and produced by Gil Brealey for the Commonwealth Film Unit. The film depicts Vic Reaves, one of the few remaining 'bullockies', hauling timber in rural New South Wales.

Bullocky was a co-winner of the Golden Reel prize at the 1969 Australian Film Institute Awards.
