= Bullock cart =

Vehicle pulled by oxen

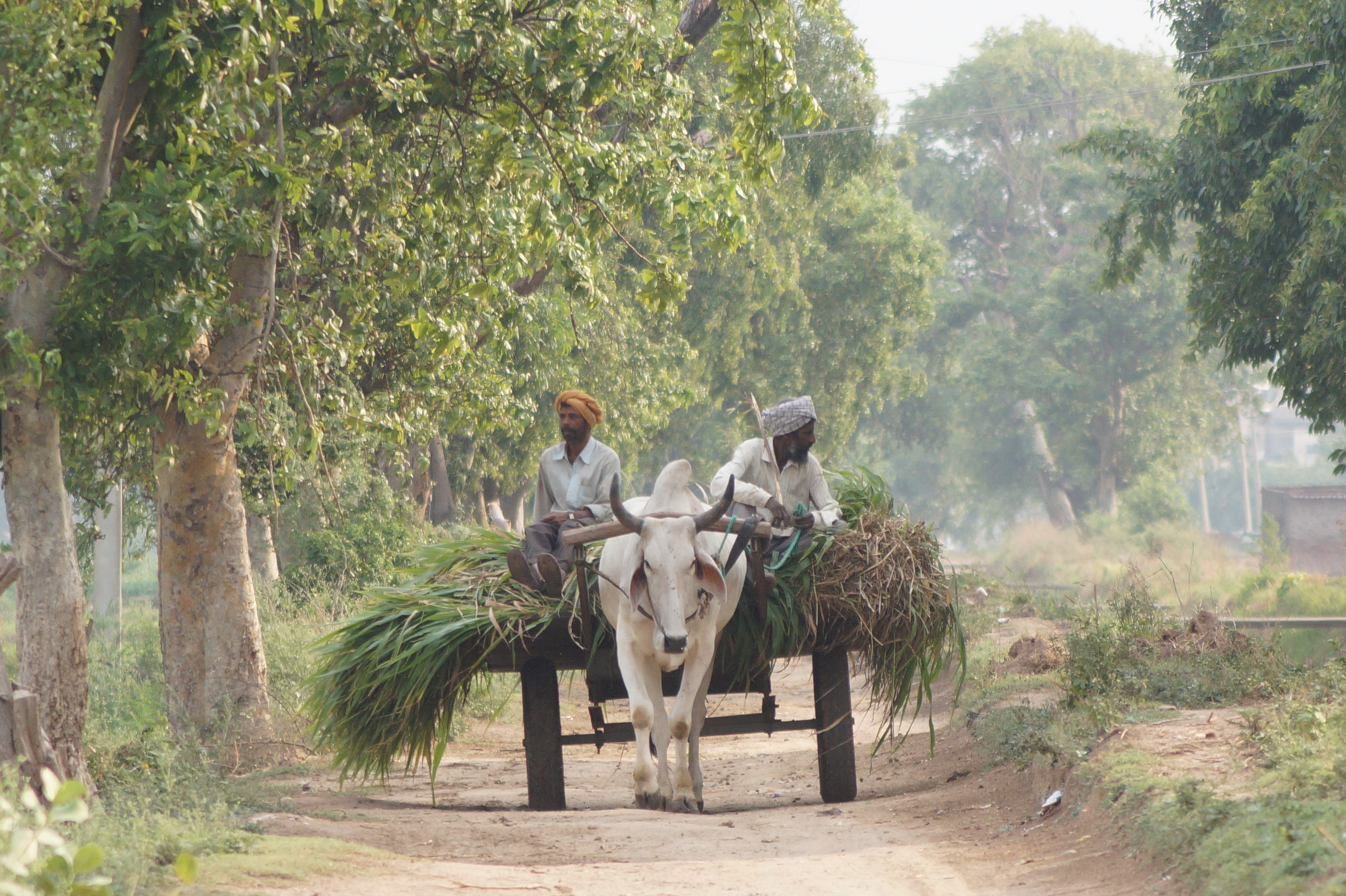
A bullock cart in Punjab, India

A bullock cart or ox cart (sometimes called a bullock carriage when carrying people in particular) is a two-wheeled or four-wheeled vehicle pulled by oxen. It is a means of transportation used since ancient times in many parts of the world. They are still used today where modern vehicles are too expensive or less suitable for the local infrastructure.

Used especially for carrying goods, the bullock cart is pulled by one or several oxen. The cart is attached to an ox team by a special chain attached to yokes, but a rope may also be used for one or two animals. The driver, and any other passengers, sit on the front of the cart, while load (if there is any) is placed in the back. Traditionally, the cargo has been agrarian goods and lumber.

== History ==
The first indications of the use of a wagon (cart tracks, incisions, model wheels) are dated to around 4400 BC. The oldest wooden wheels usable for transport were found in southern Russia and dated to 3325 ± 125 BC. Evidence of wheeled vehicles appears from the mid-4th millennium BC, between the North Sea and Mesopotamia. The earliest vehicles may have been ox carts.

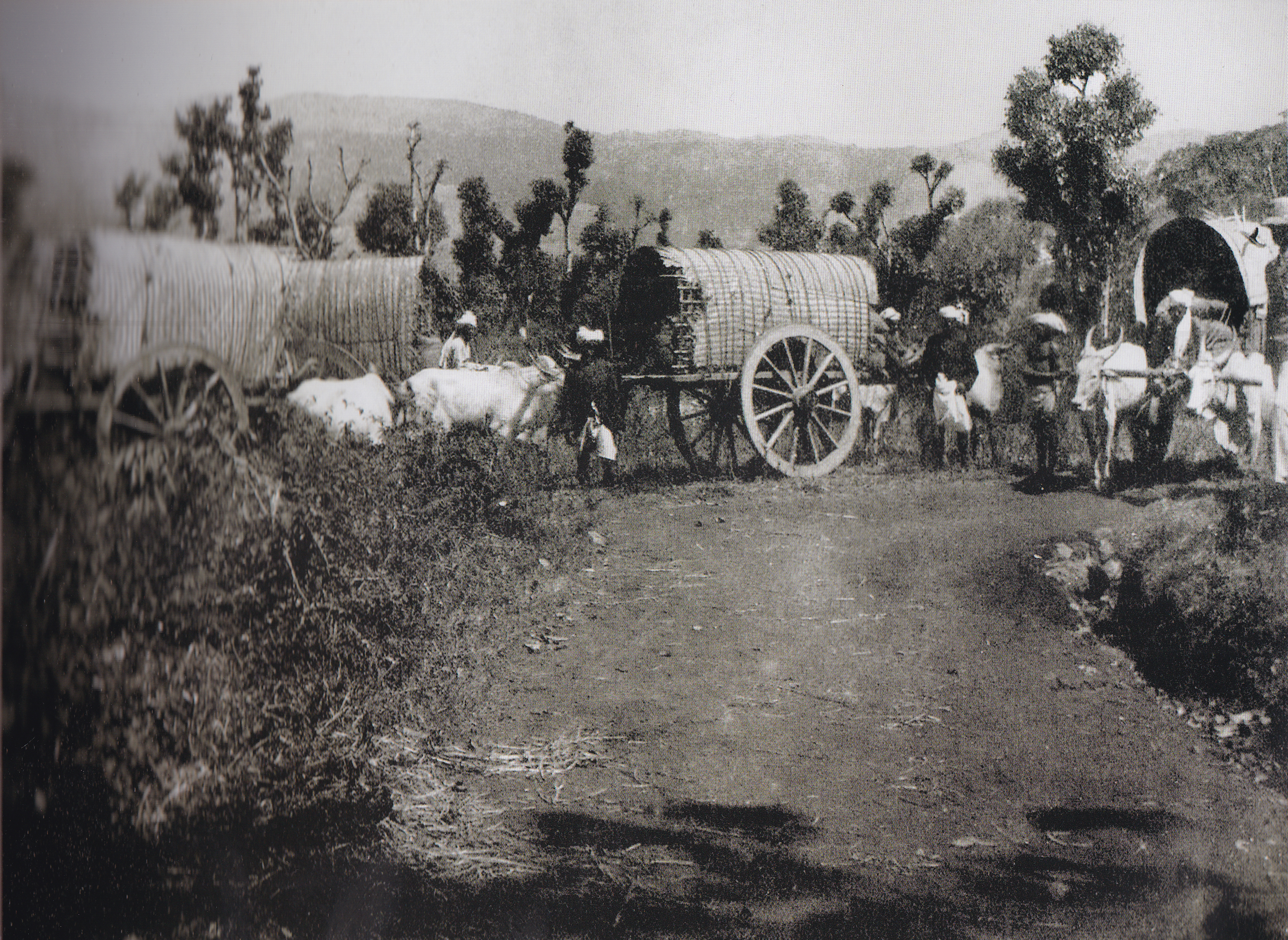
Indian people with their bullock carts c. the early 1900s.

== Australia ==
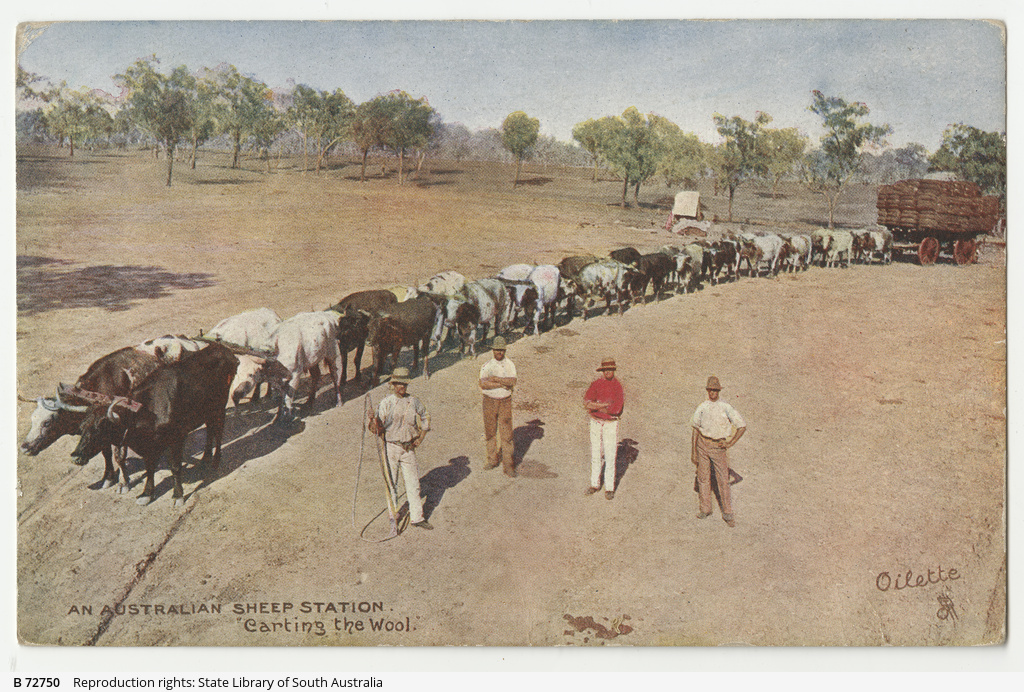
A colour postcard printed in England by Raphael Tuck & Sons, and featuring an "Oilette" image of a bullock team carting a load of wool. The card is titled: "An Australian Sheep Station. Carting the Wool."

In Australia, bullock carts were referred to as bullock drays if they had two wheels, and bullock wagons, if they had four wheels, and they were usually used for carrying large loads. There were also four-wheeled vehicles known as jinkers, which had no tray and were used to carry large tree logs or other large round objects, such as boilers. They were pulled by bullock teams, which could consist of 20 or more animals. The driver of a bullock team was known as a 'bullocky'.

Bullock teams were used extensively to transport produce from rural areas to major towns and ports. Because of Australia's size, these journeys often covered large distances and could take many days and even weeks.

== Costa Rica ==
In Costa Rica, ox carts (carretas in the Spanish language) were an important aspect of daily life and commerce, especially between 1850 and 1935, developing a unique construction and decoration tradition that is still being developed. Costa Rican parades and traditional celebrations often include a traditional ox cart parade.

In 1988, the traditional ox cart was declared as National Symbol of Work by the Costa Rican government.

In 2005, the "Oxherding and Oxcart Traditions in Costa Rica" were included in UNESCO's Representative List of the Intangible Cultural Heritage of Humanity.

== Indonesia ==
Ox cart with bajingan at Prambanan Temple Festival

In Indonesia, bullock carts are used in the rural parts of the country for transporting goods and people, but horse carts are more common. A bullock cart driver is known as a bajingan in Indonesian. In Javanese, the term bajingan holds dual meanings. While commonly used as a colloquial term for a scoundrel or rogue, it also denotes an oxcart coachman.

Historically, oxcarts symbolized prestige, often owned by respected figures within villages. However, with the advent of modern transportation, their practical use has largely diminished. Today, many oxcarts are preserved as collectibles, stored in barns by hobbyists who seek to maintain this traditional heritage.

== Malaysia ==
Bullock carts were widely used in Malaysia before the introduction of automobiles, and many are still used today. These included passenger vehicles, now used especially for tourists. Passenger carts are usually equipped with awnings for protection against sun and rain, and are often gaily decorated.

== North Korea ==
Bullock carts, called dalguji, are still extensively used in North Korea because of fuel shortages. It is one of the few countries where it is used for everyday transportation, both in agriculture and in the military.

== Gallery ==
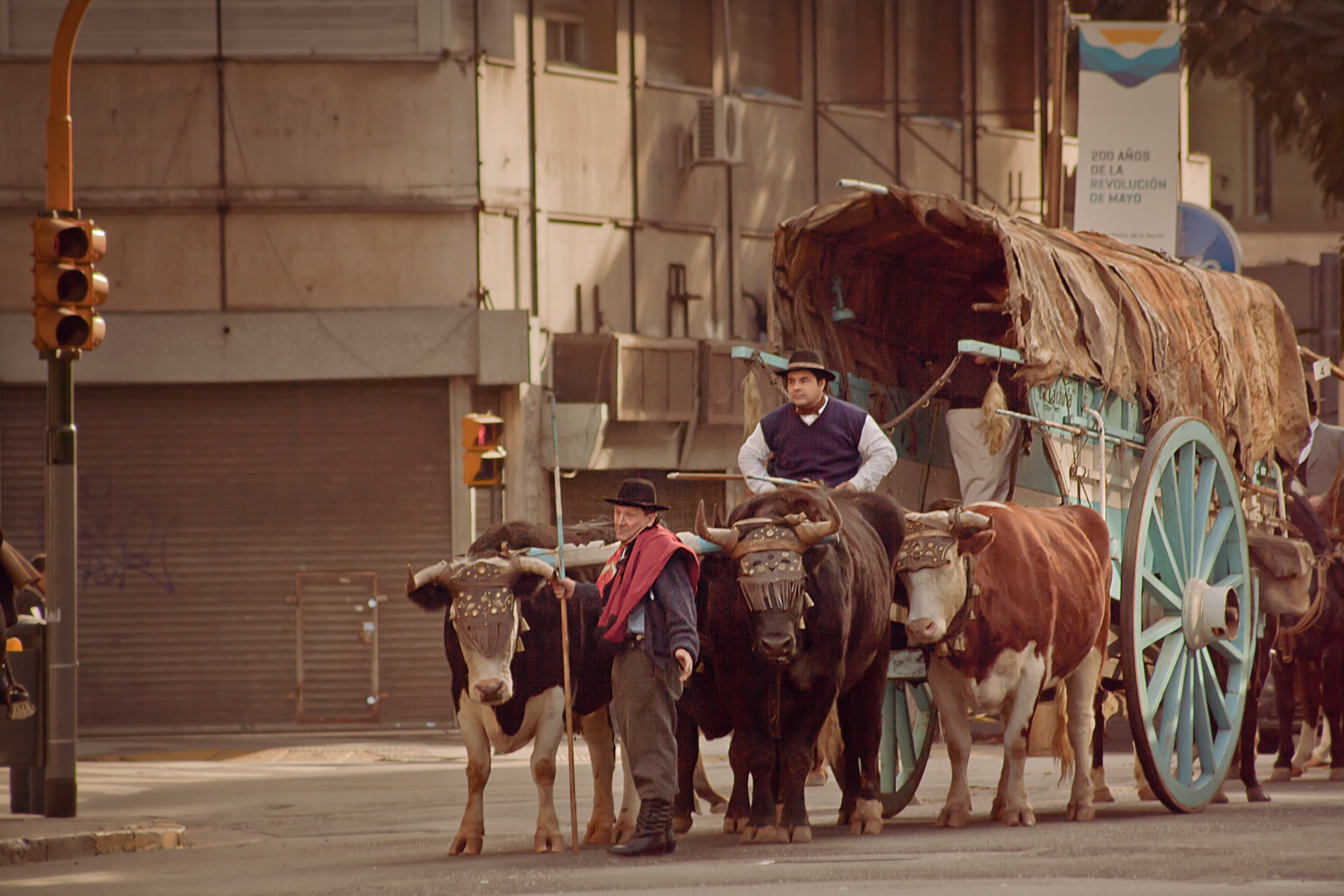
Gauchos with an ox-drawn cart in Argentina

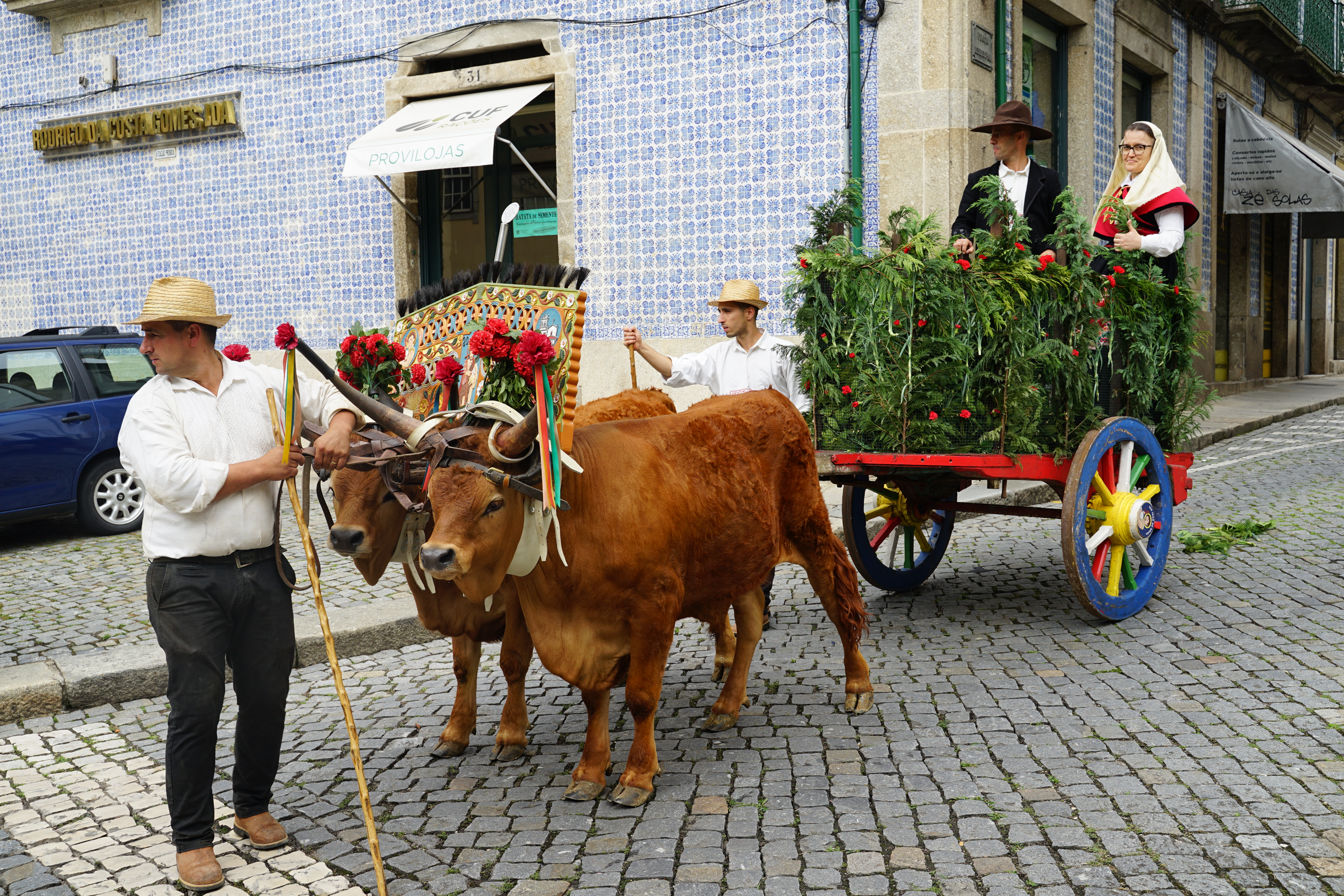
Cattle-drawn cart in Portugal

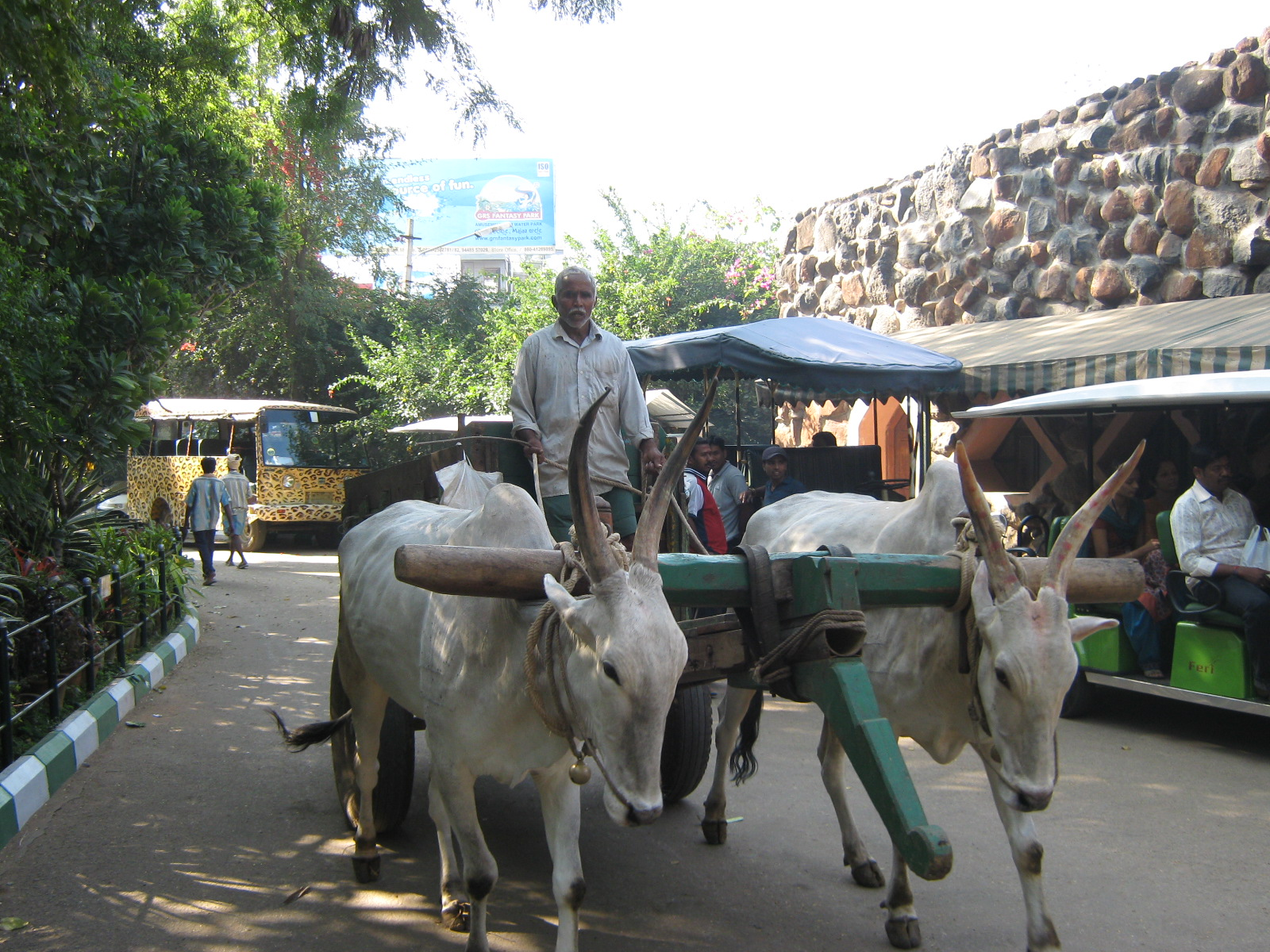
Bullock cart in Mysore Zoo, India

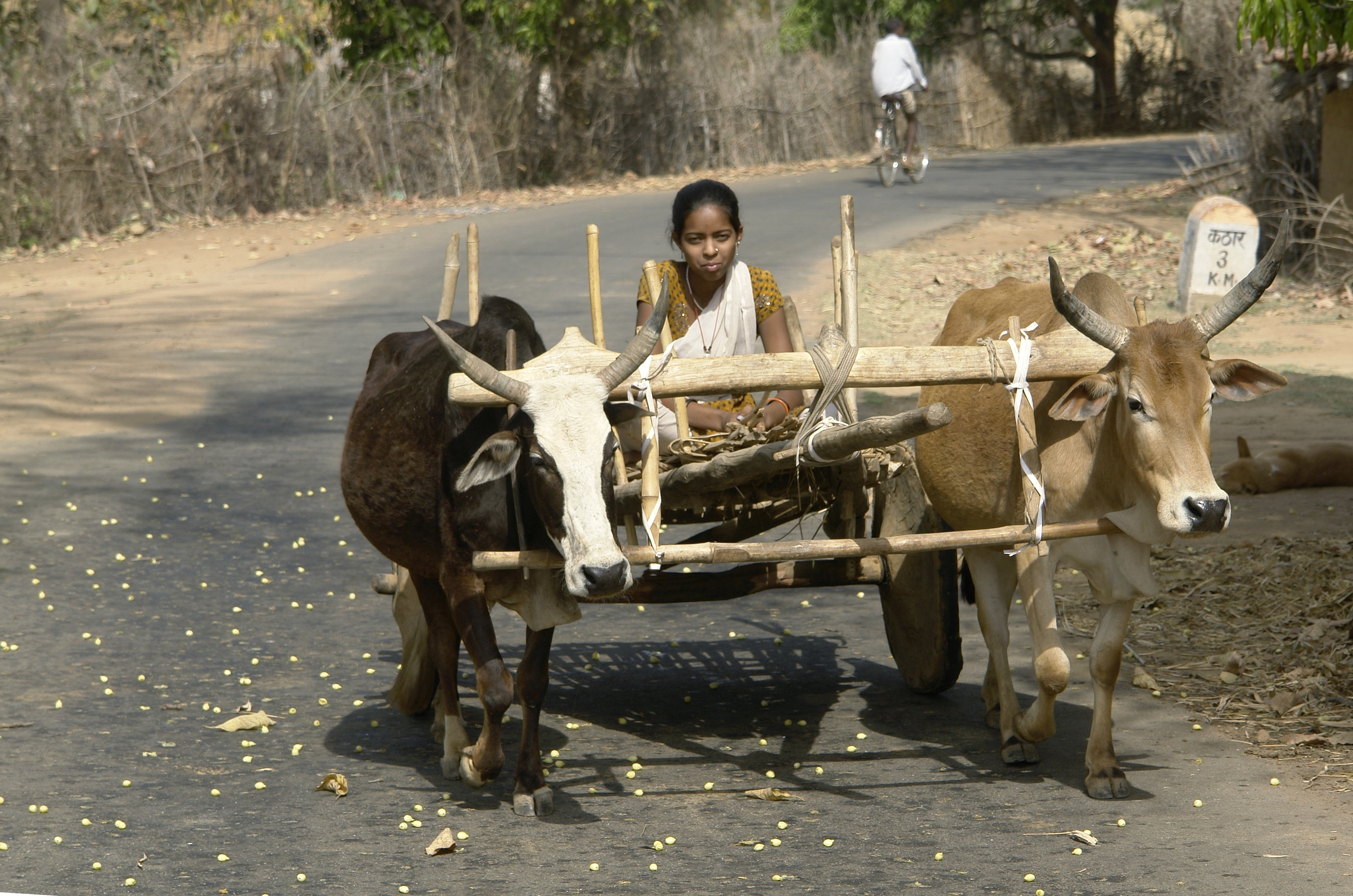
A bullock cart in India

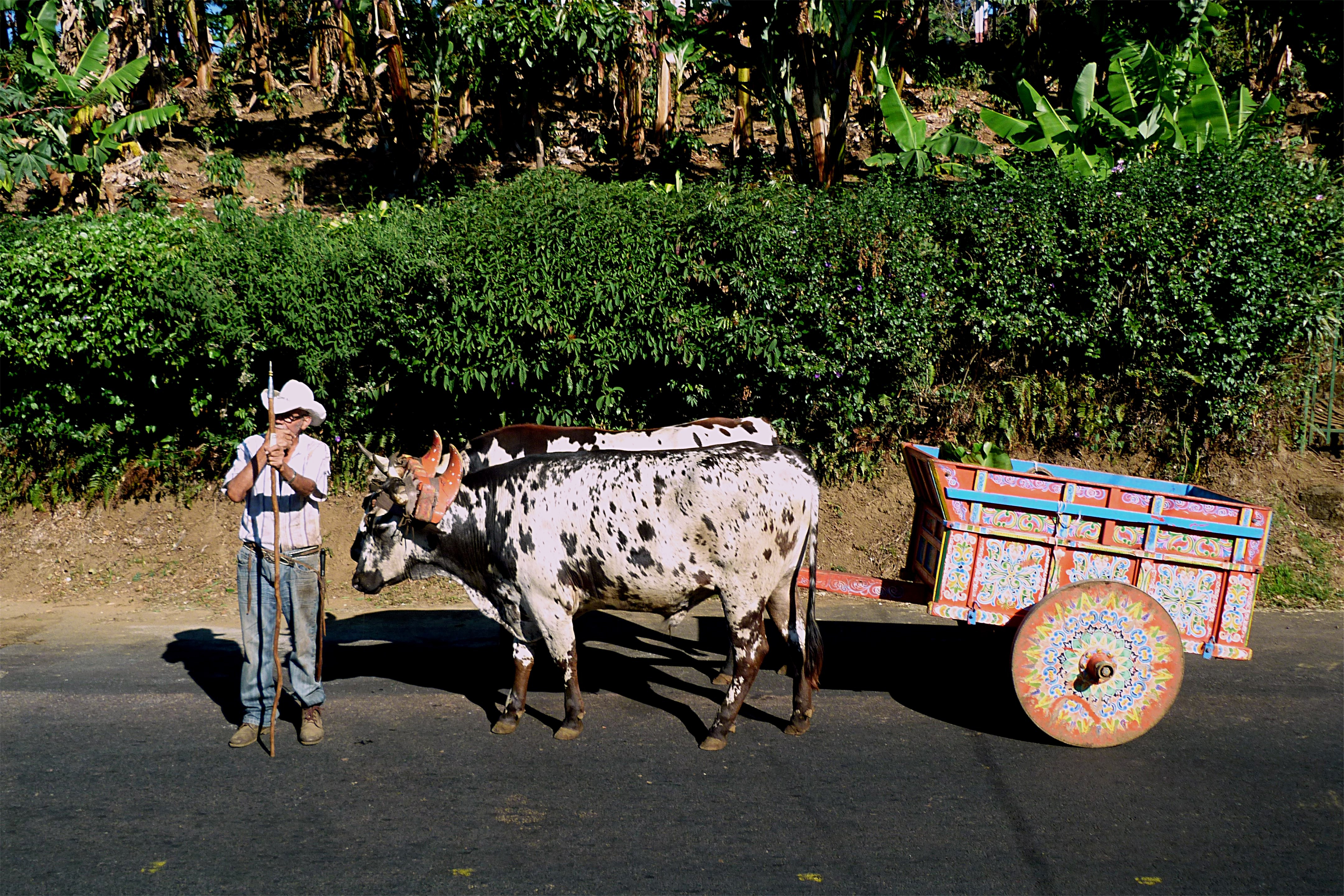
Typical oxcart decoration of Costa Rica

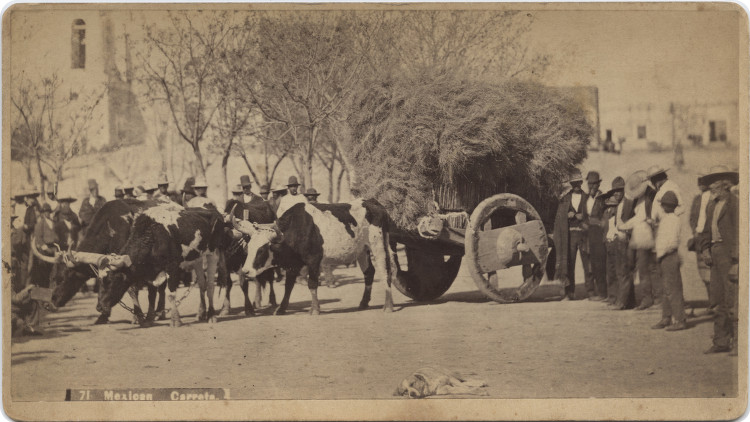
Mexican carreta in El Paso, Texas, circa 1885. Photo courtesy SMU

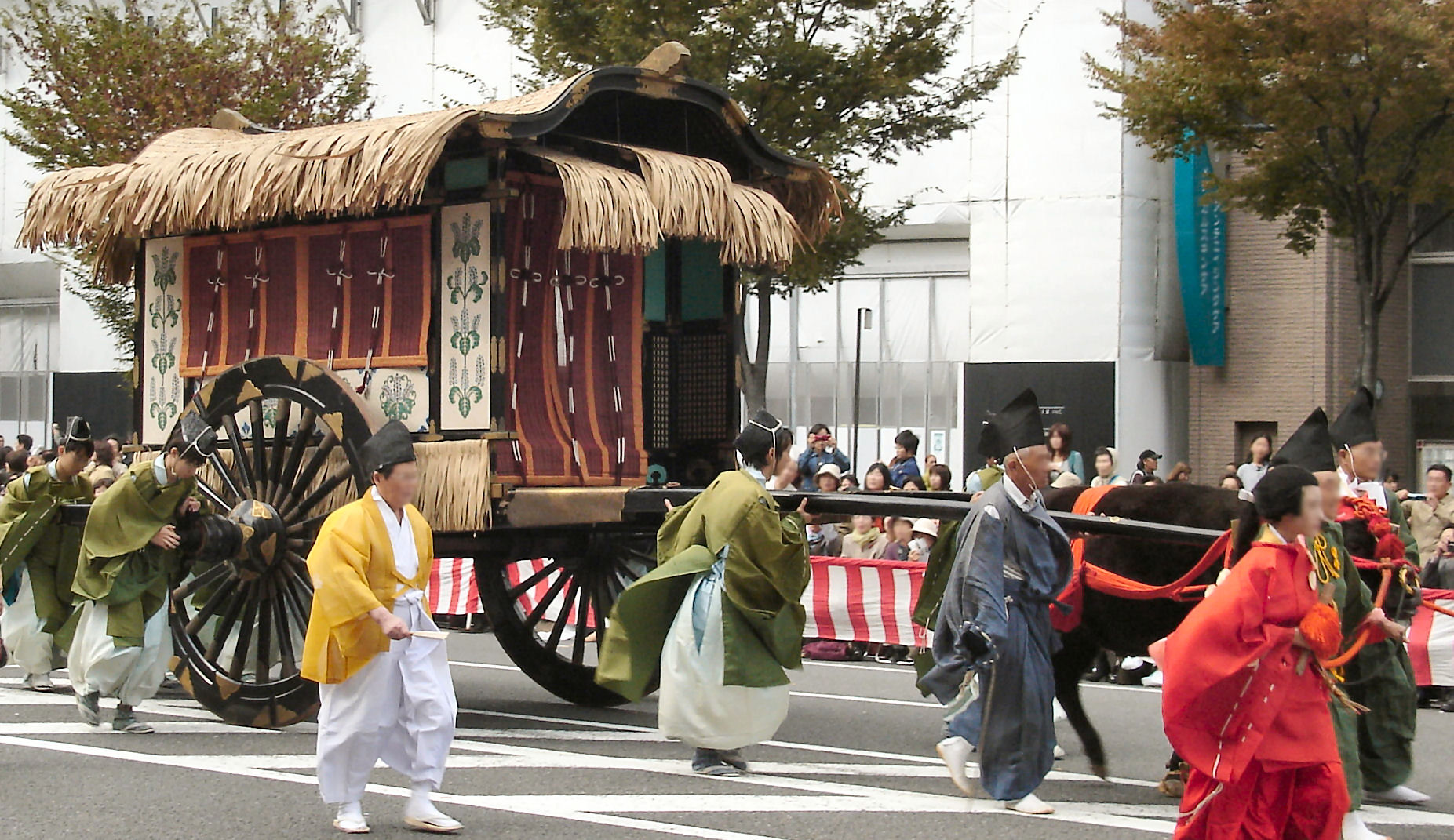
Reproduction Japanese aristocracy's bullock cart in Jidai Matsuri

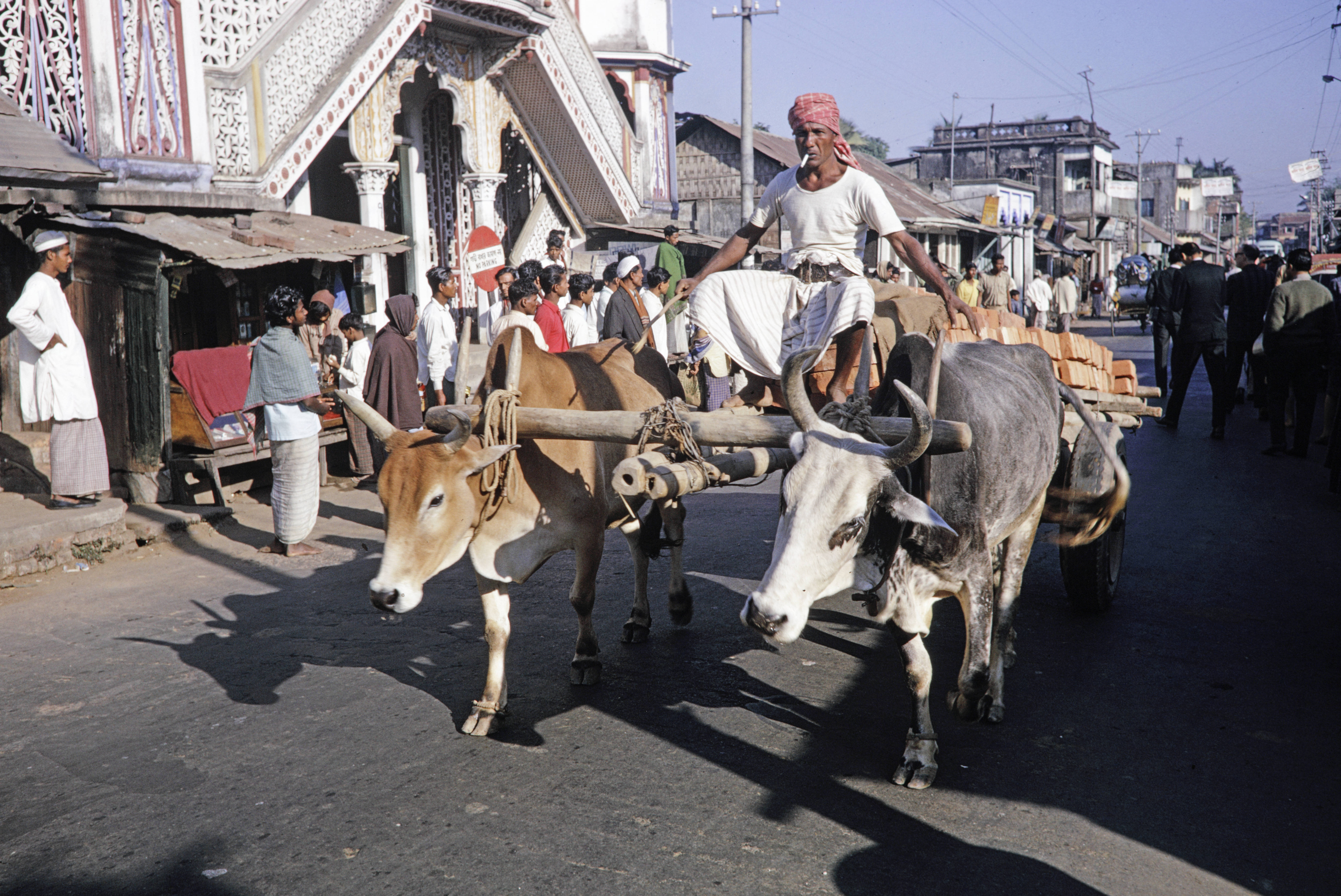
Oxen-drawn cart passing Chandanpura Mosque in Chittagong, Bangladesh

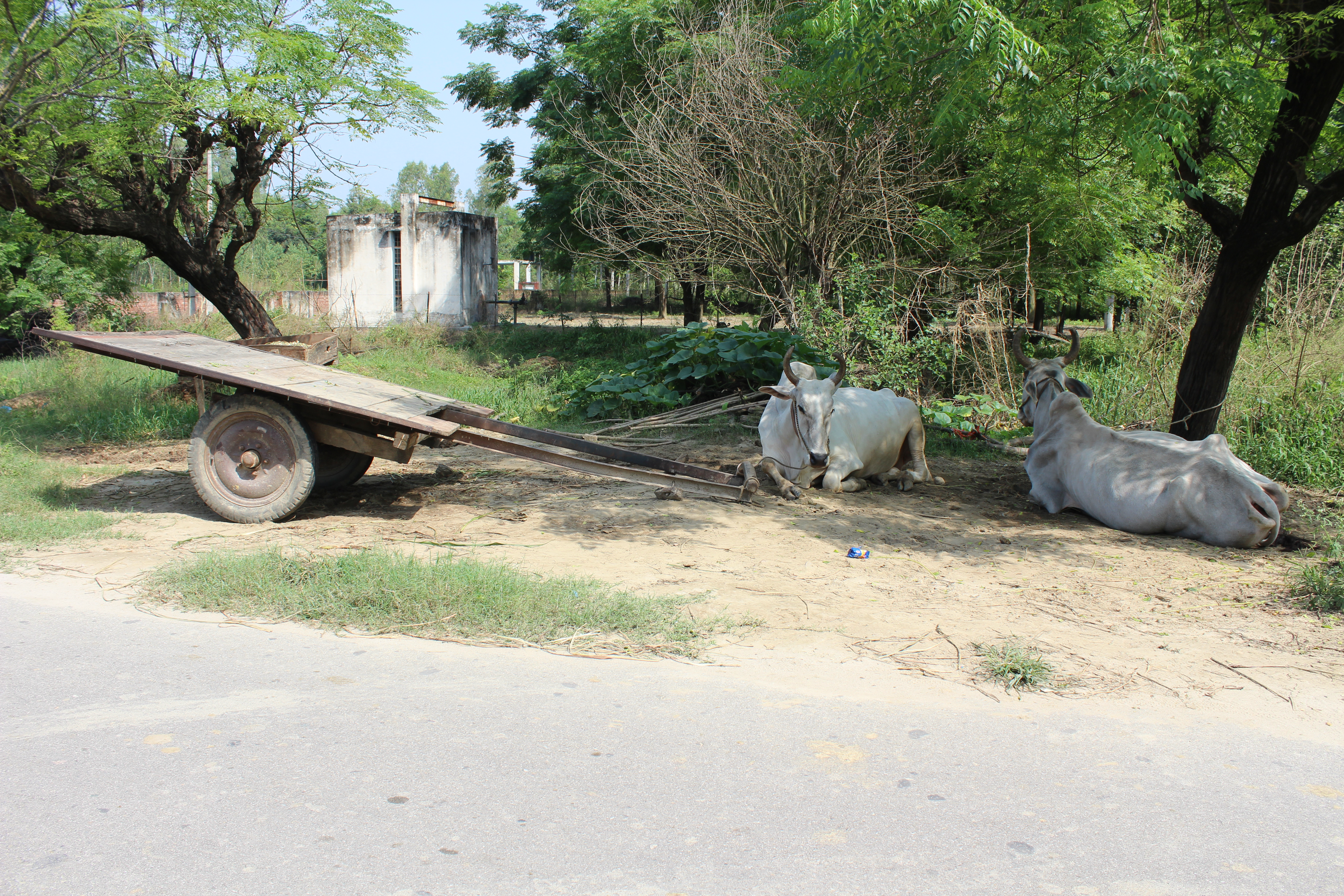
Bullock Cart in Punjab

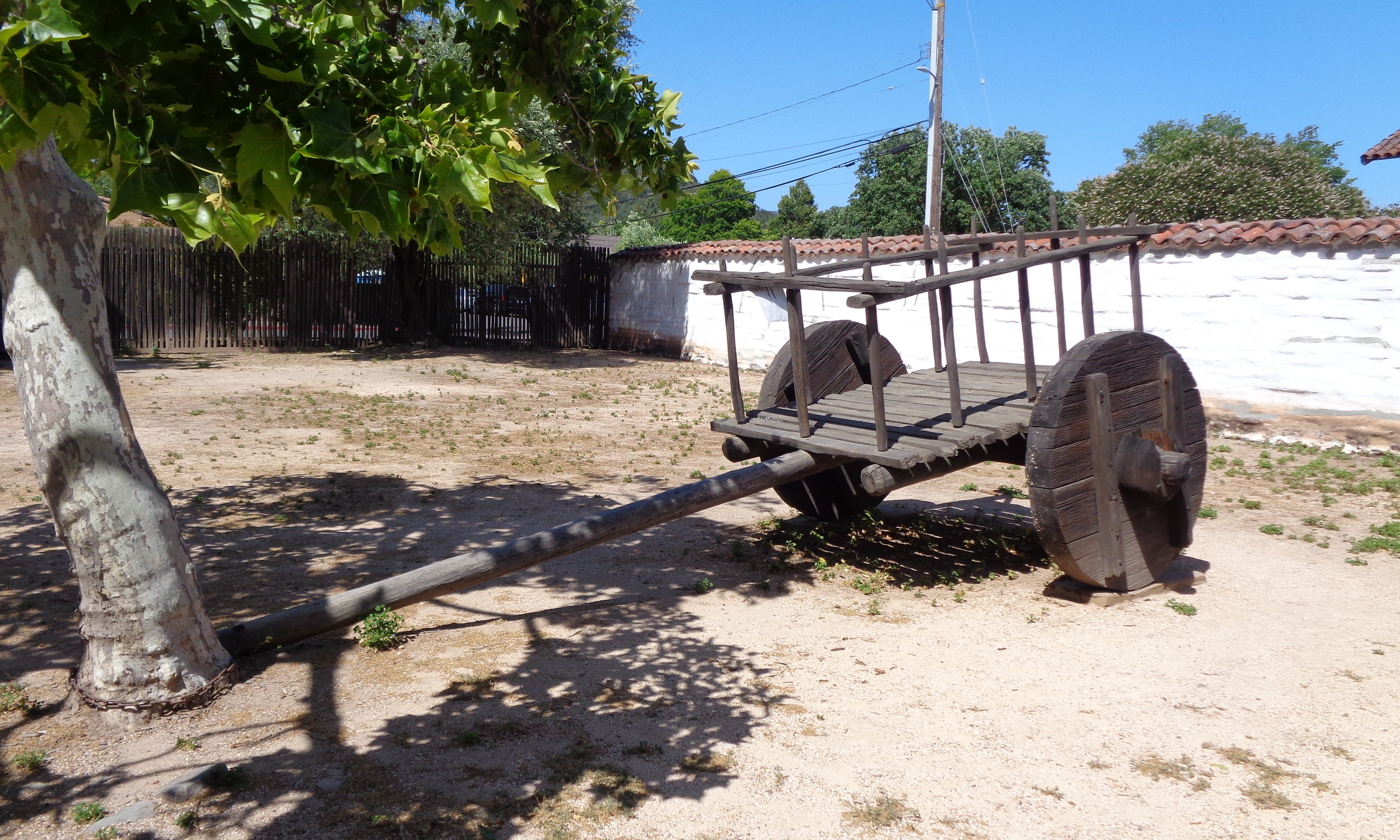
A bullock cart of 1836 in California

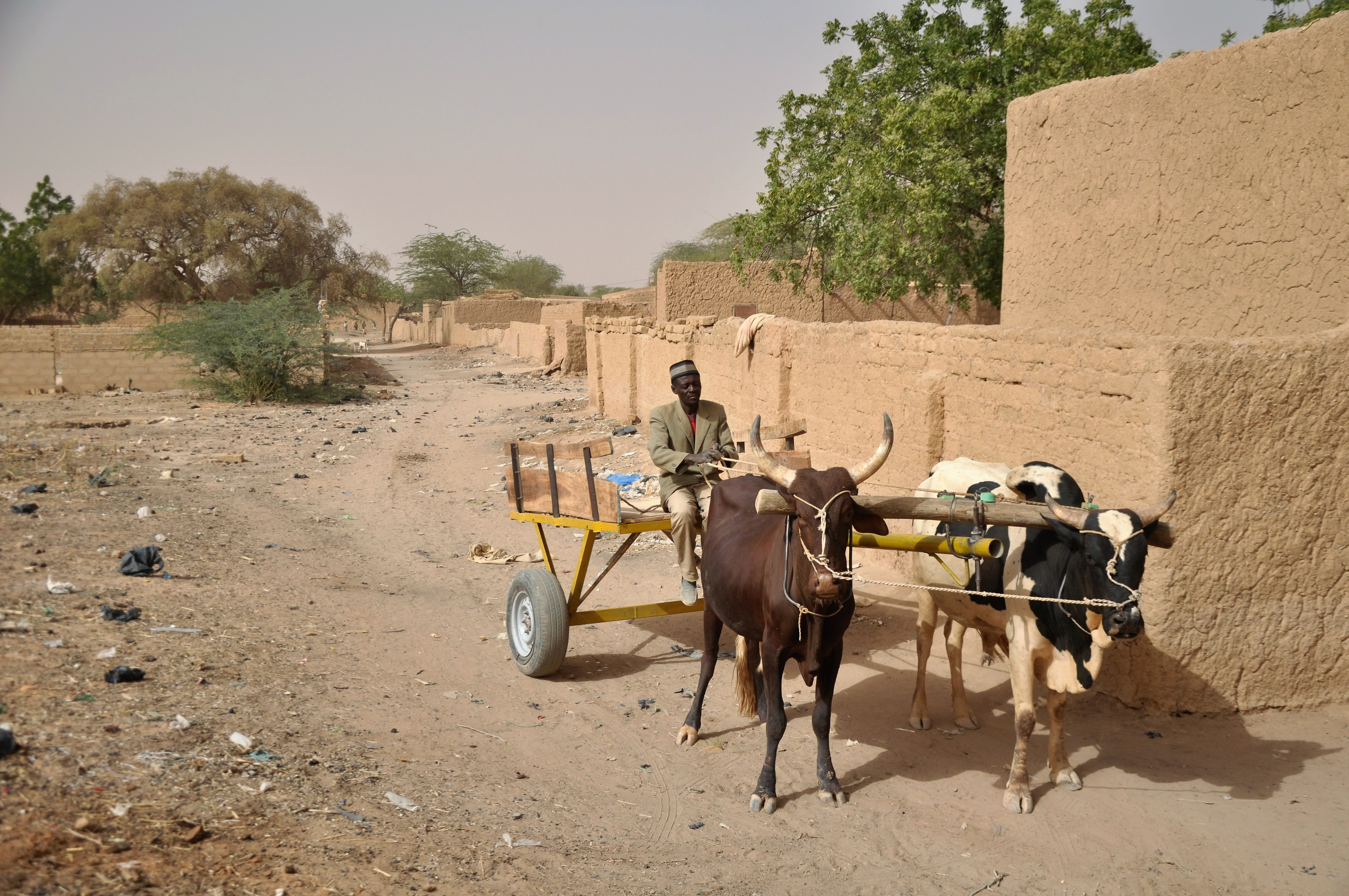
Ox-drawn cart in Filingué, Niger

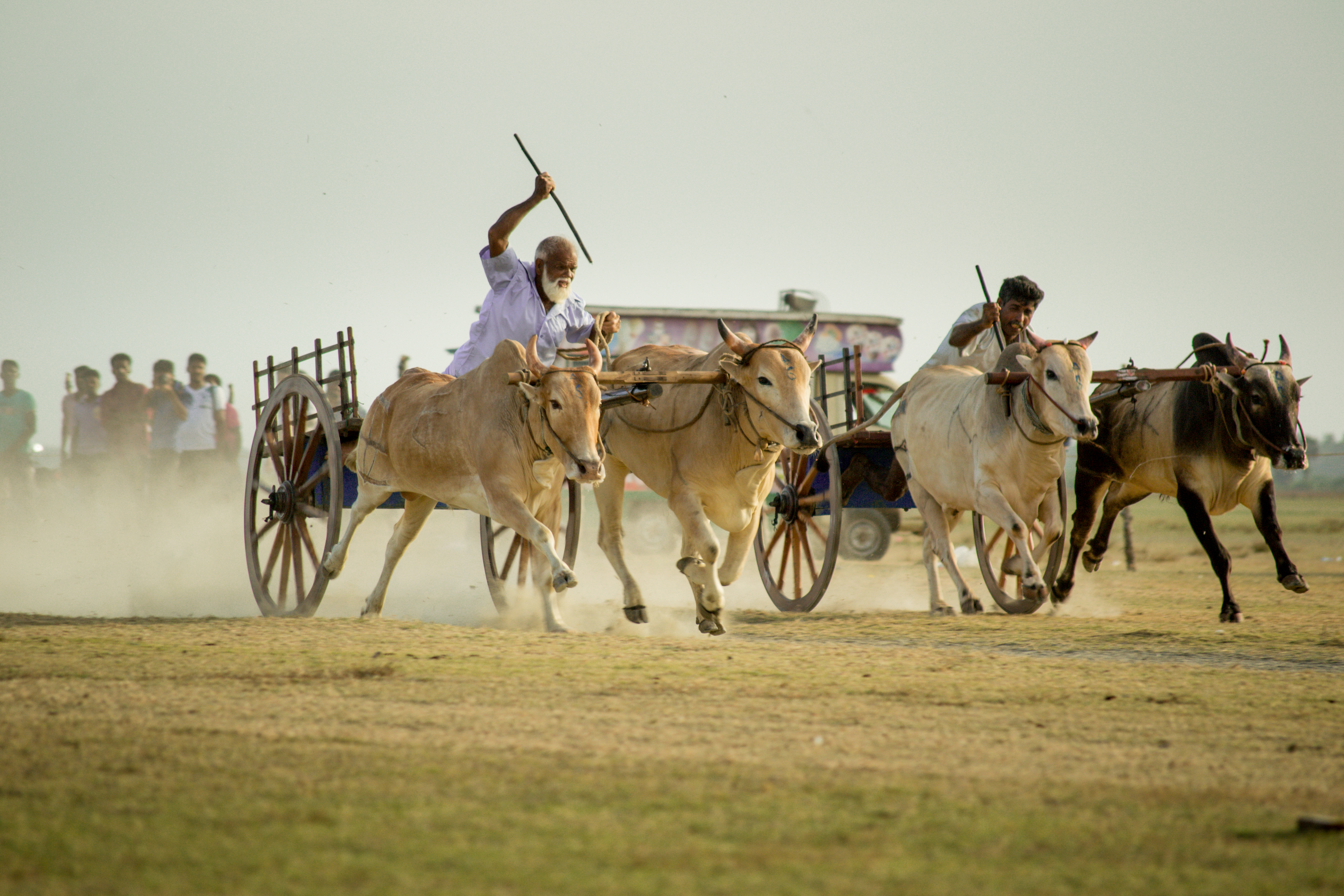
Bullock cart race in Jaffna, Sri Lanka

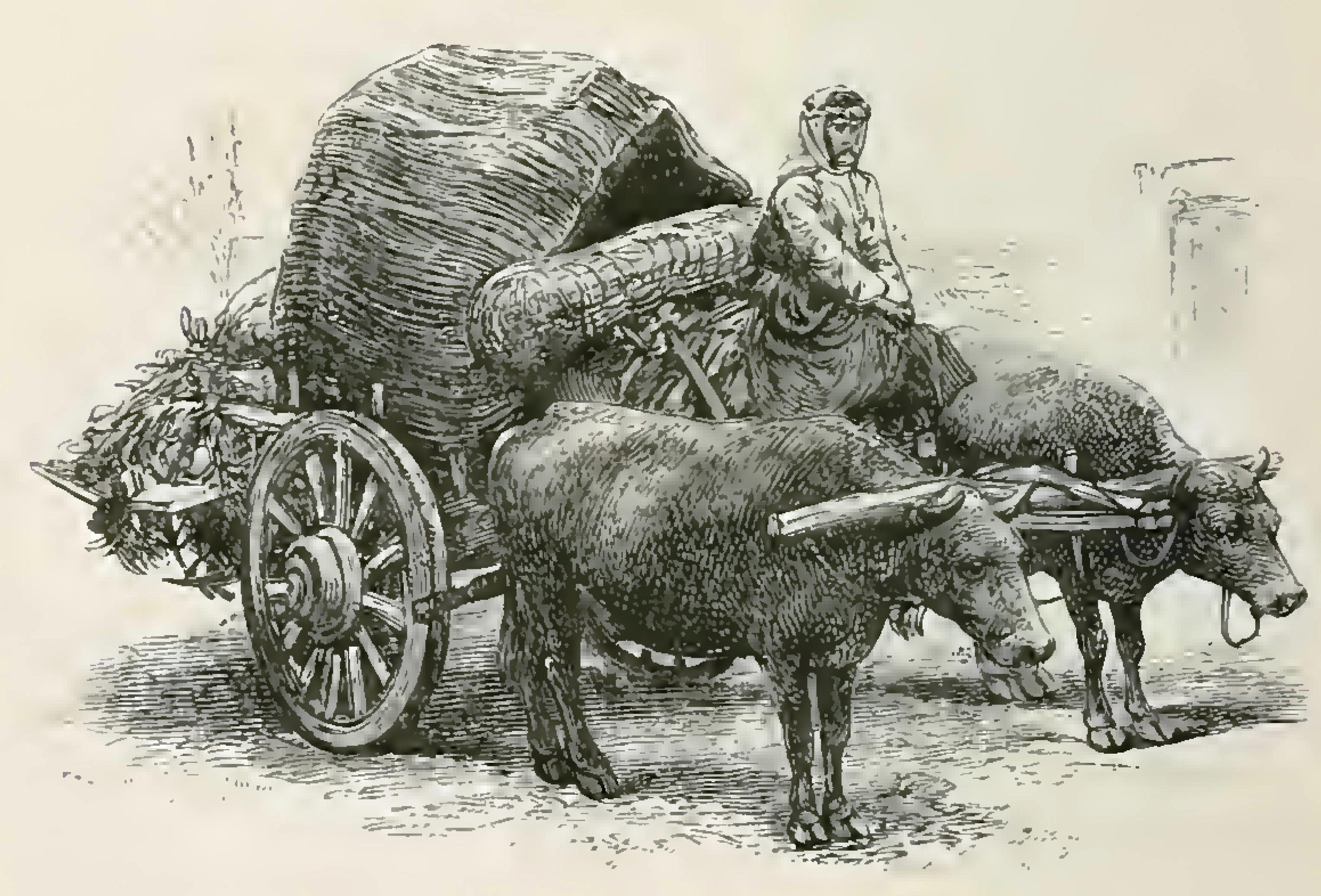
Ox-drawn cart in Georgia, circa 1883

A man with an ox cart in Mount Airy, North Carolina in the early 20th century

Ox cart with contemporary automobile in about 1907, Massachusetts

== See also ==
- Bullocky, Australian term for the driver of a bullock team
- Oxbow
- Ox-wagon
- Red River cart
