= Bullocky =

Driver of a bullock team

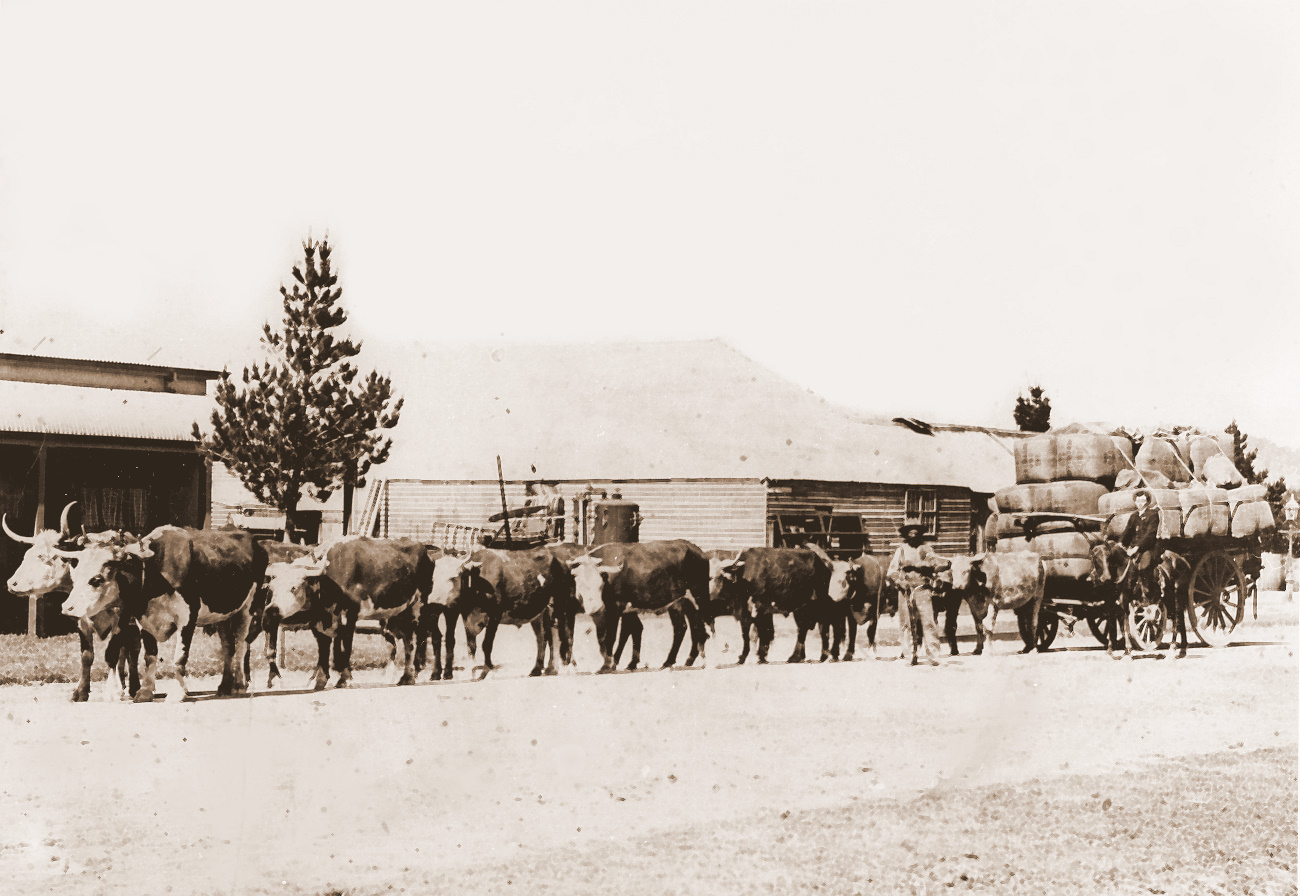
Bullock team hauling wool on a dray, Walcha, New South Wales

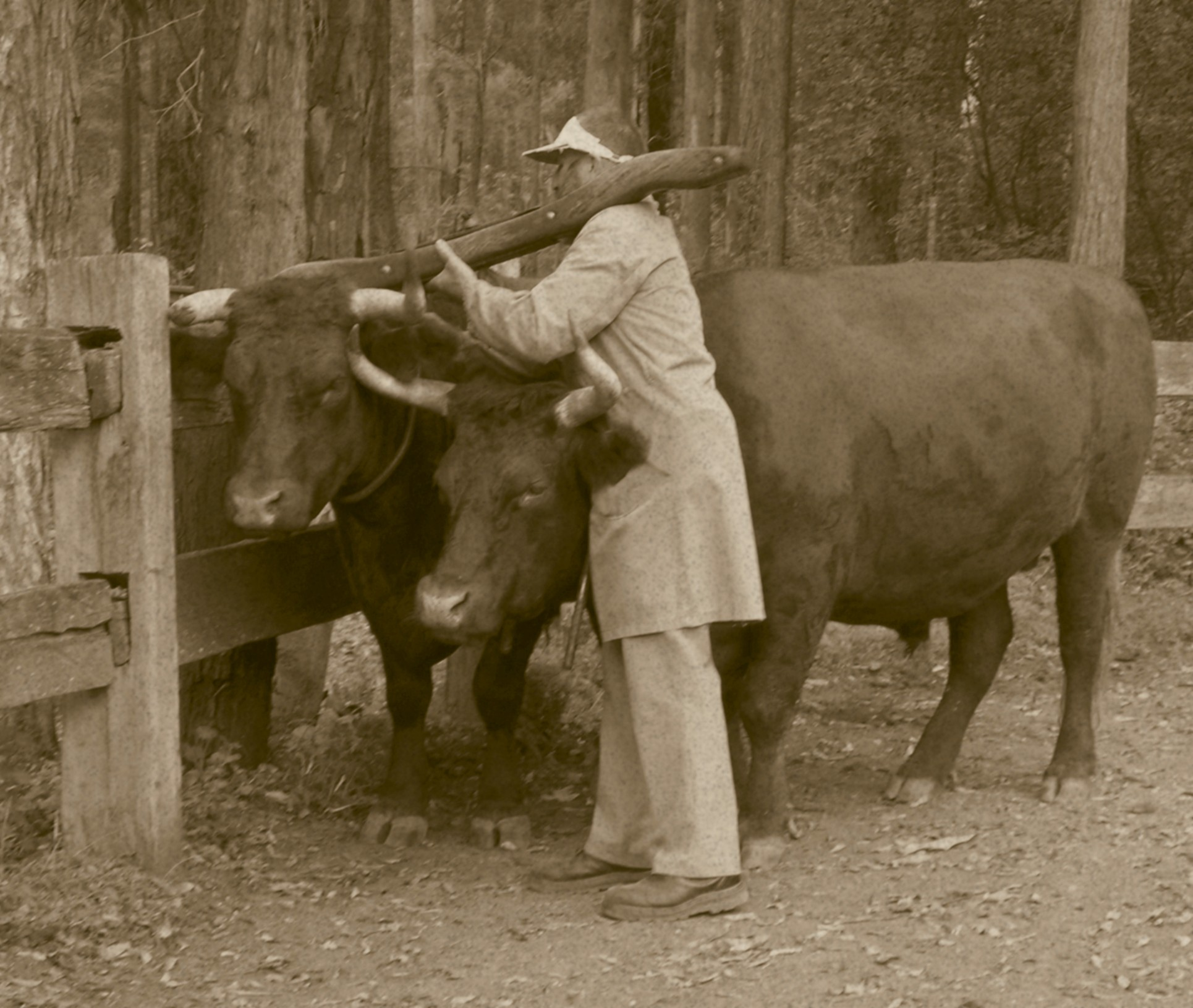
Yoking up the leaders of a bullock team.

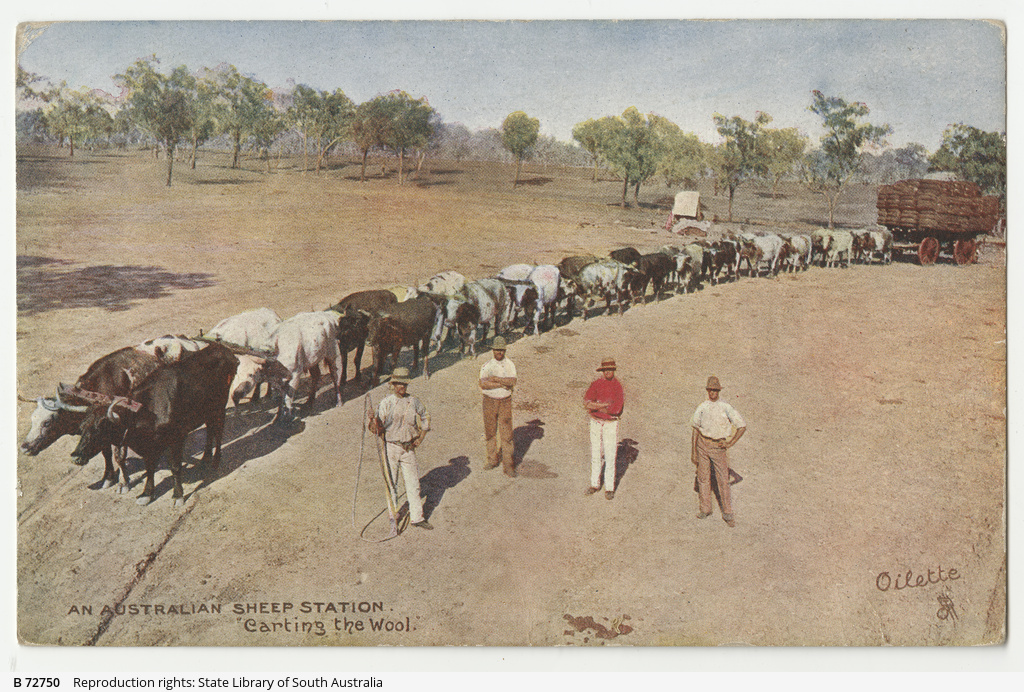
A colour postcard printed of a team of 26 bullocks carting a large load of wool ca. 1909.

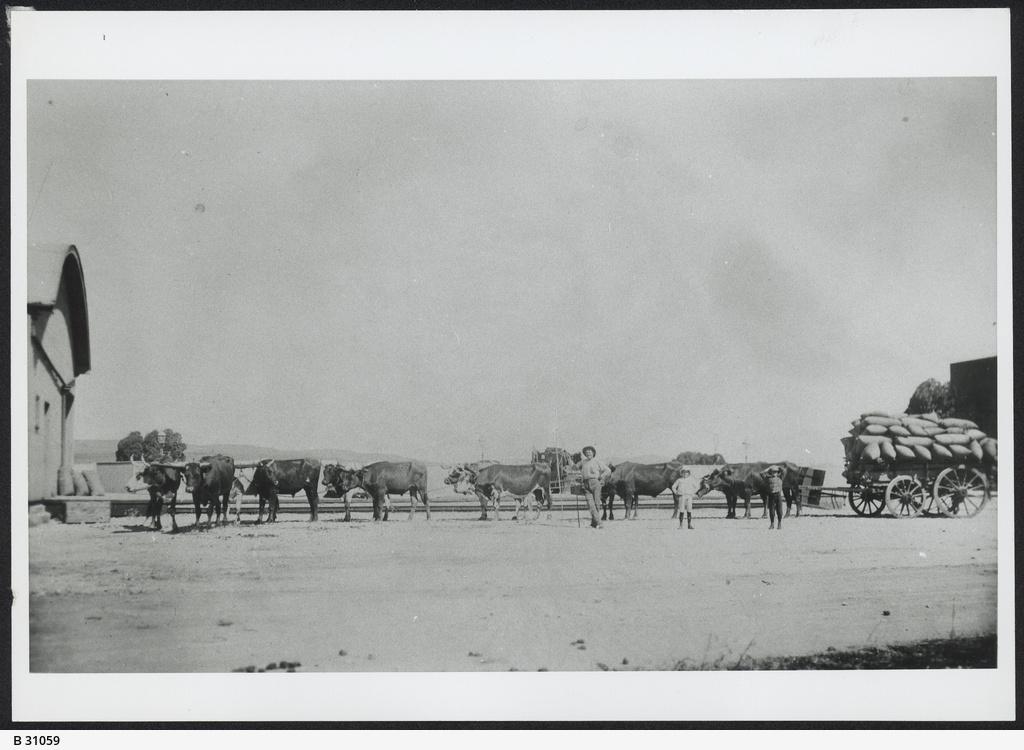
A bullock team at Farrell Flat, South Australia in 1911.

A bullocky is an Australian English term for the driver of a bullock team. The American term is bullwhacker. Bullock drivers were also known as teamsters or carriers.

== History ==
Bullock teams were in use in Sydney in 1795 when they were used for hauling building materials. The early explorers, Hume and Hovell in 1824 and Charles Sturt, later in 1828-9, also used bullock teams during their explorations.

Before the gold rushes in Australia, in the mid 19th century, bullock drays carried essential food and station supplies to isolated country areas. On return trips they transported wheat, wool, sugar cane, and timber by drays drawn by teams of draught animals (either bullocks or horses) to shipping ports before the advent of rail. They travelled constantly across the landscape, servicing the pastoral stations and settlements far from regional transport hubs and urban centres. Some of the larger stations maintained their own teams for local use when harvesting and transporting wool. Both bullock and horse wagons carried heavy loads of wool and wheat which was the main produce transported over long distances, plus chaff and hay. A bullock wagon could only travel approximately three miles an hour (depending on the load and terrain) therefore it was slower than a horse team.

Bullock drivers were typically skilled tough men who often faced extreme difficulties during their job. Bullockies were also colourful characters, often noted for their strong language. Some did not swear though, relying solely on gesture, talking and whip movements as persuasion for the team's job at hand. A typical bullocky wore a cabbage tree hat, a twill shirt of that period, moleskin trousers, blucher boots and carried a long bullock whip which in many instances he had made.

During the early years the bullock tracks were very rough with narrow, steep "pinches", plus dangerous river and creek crossings. Many roads still follow the tracks made by bullock teams as they negotiated their way up or down hills via a winding course to make haulage easier.

== Equipment and method ==
Bullocks were less excitable and more dependable when faced with difficulties than horses. Furthermore, bullocks were cheaper to purchase, equip and feed. Horses also required complex, expensive leather harness that frequently needed repair. Bullock gear was simple and the yokes were sometimes made by the bullocky from different kinds of timber.

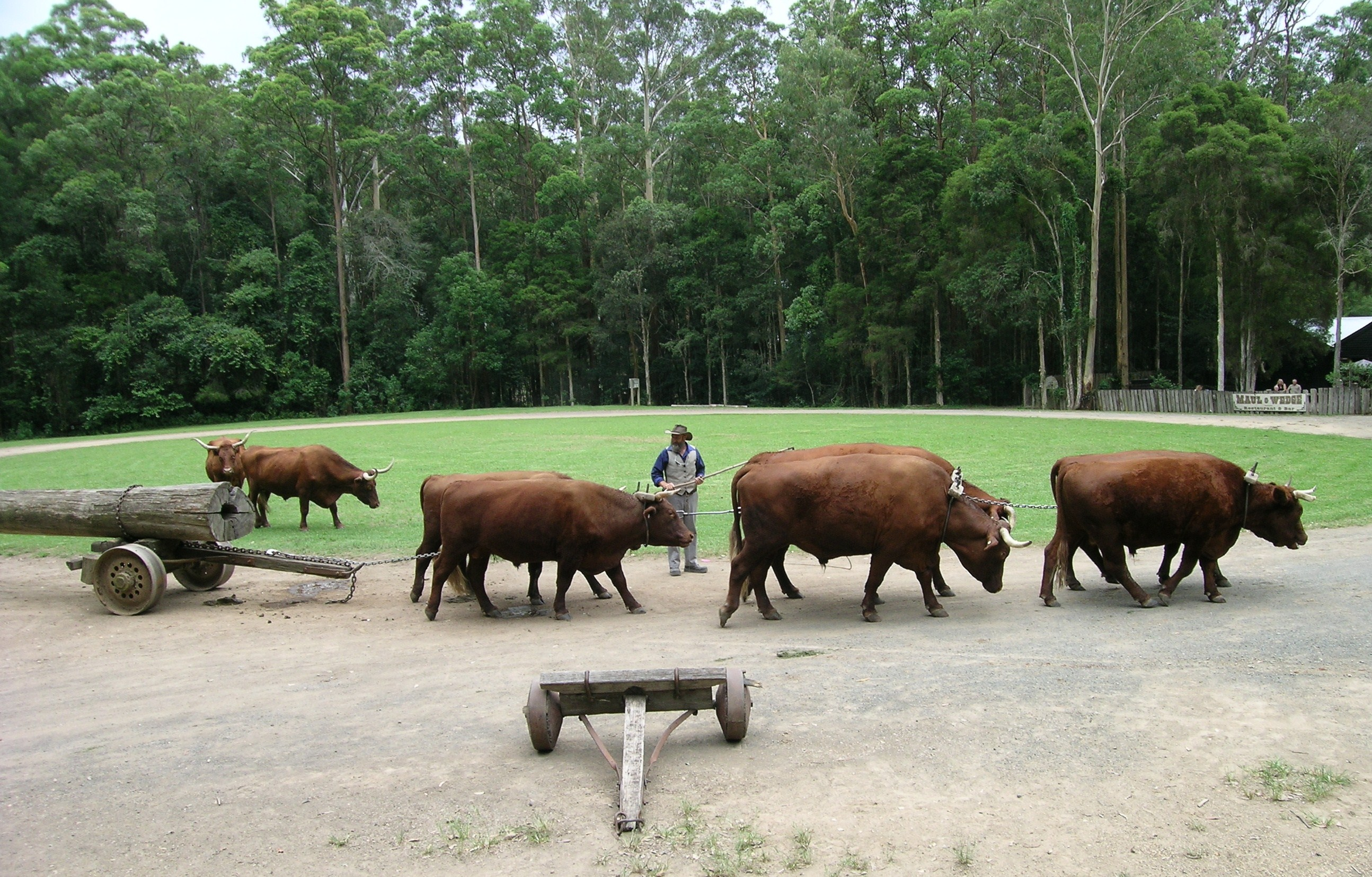
A bullock team hitched to two small jinkers (log conveyances) with a dolly in the foreground.

Bullockies often chose Devon cattle because they were plentiful, hardy, tractable and readily matched up the team, which was often a source of pride to the owners. Teams had to be educated to perform their respective tasks, too. The first part of a bullock's education began when the bullocky tied two young bullocks together with two heavy leather collars and a connecting chain. Thus connected they were turned out to graze and rest until they accepted the close presence of their partner. Untrained bullocks were then put in the centre of the team, where they were more easily controlled with the assistance and guidance of the "leaders" who were well trained to verbal commands. Pairs of bullocks were matched for size and yoked together using a wooden yoke secured to each bullock by a metal bow which was fixed in place by key on top of the yoke. Each pair was connected by a special chain, which ran from a central ring on each yoke to the next pair, thus coupling the team in tandem fashion. The "wheelers" or "polers" were the older, heavier, trained bullocks which were closest to the dray or jinker and helped to slow the load when necessary. Thus then was the team attached to the dray or jinker.

A bullocky walked on the nearside (left) of the bullocks for added control of the team and also because seating was not usually provided on the wagons and jinkers. The bullocky called each bullock by name to adjust its pace and effort. If the whip was needed it was flicked out in front of the bullock driver; then by the use of all his strength he swung it over his head, often twirling it several times before he cracked it or let fall upon the back of a bullock he might wish to reach. Sometimes the bullocky had an "offsider" (a type of an apprentice) who walked on the offside (right) of the team and also assisted the bullocky yoke up and care for the team. Many Australians who have never had contact with bullocky or a team still use the word "offsider’ as a synonym for an assistant, helper or learner.

A bullock whip had a stick handle that was cut from a spotted gum or another native tree and was approximately six or seven feet long. The long handled whip permitted the bullocky to control his bullocks while keeping a safe working distance from the danger of being run down by a large dray or jinker. The thong, often made of plaited greenhide, was 8 to 10 feet long and attached to the handle by a leather loop. These thongs, graduated in thickness from the handle down to the size of a lead pencil at the fall, which was about 2 ½ feet long. The bullockies often didn't use a cracker, but if they did it was knotted into the end of the fall.

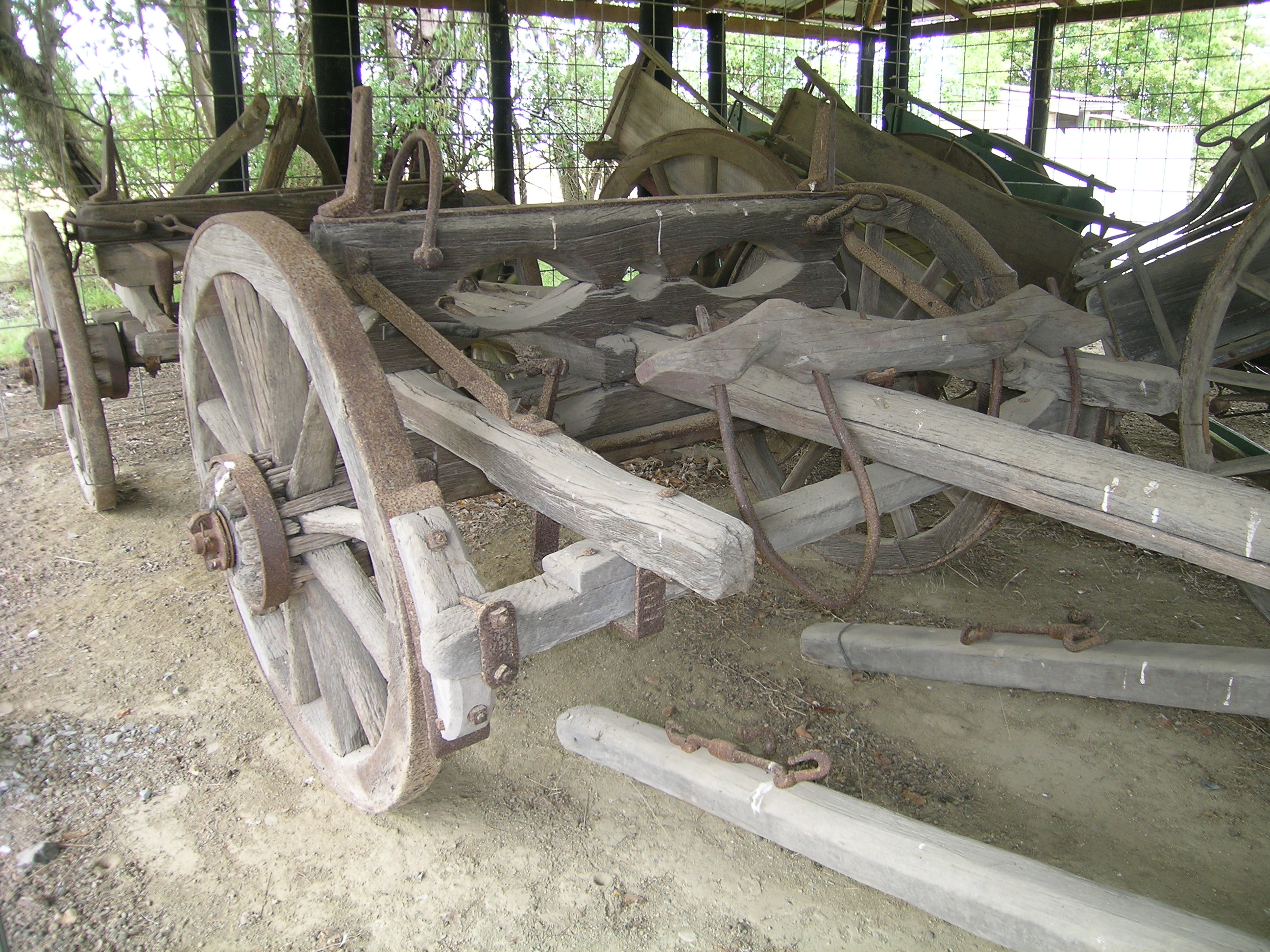
A four-wheeled jinker with a bullock yoke and bows resting on the pole.

Bullock teams also dragged the heavy logs from some very steep, rough country to be loaded onto a jinker for hauling to a saw mill. Teams of up to thirty bullocks hauled large flat-top wagons or jinkers fitted with a single pole instead of shafts. Timber jinkers were of a four-wheel type were capable of carrying large logs up to seven feet in diameter. The less common two wheeled jinkers bore and carried the front of log, leaving the end to trail along behind. Two jinkers could also be connected, with the back jinker linked by a log which would be chained to the front jinker. Jinkers were used in the transport of "Red Gold," Australian red cedar (Toona ciliata), and other logs to sawmills or to a river for further transport.

On steep hills bullock teams often required additional assistance to negotiate these inclines. This assistance was provided by hitching two or more teams together for the ascent. On steep descents logs or trees were dragged behind the dray, wagon or jinker to slow the load's descent and protect the team from injury. Shanties and villages grew to serve the needs of the road's users at the site of difficult range and river crossings where teams met.

Bullock teams were still used to drag logs from the forests to log dumps after the introduction of logging trucks. Nowadays they are mainly used for exhibition purposes.

== Early references ==
The following reference is from the newspaper The Australasian of 17 July 1869 (page 17): "Cornstalk and gumsucker are both of colonial growth, and so, I think, is… bullocky (a teamster)".

Percy Clarke's ‘New Chum’ in Australia (1886) has the following reference (page 137): "I knew a ‘bullockie’ (as these men are dubbed) who had a team of twelve beasts under his command which obeyed his every word and never received a word, which a ‘high-born ladie’ might not have listened to".

== Depictions in literature and popular culture ==
- "Bill the Bullock Driver" by Henry Kendall (poem, 1876)
- "The Teams" by Henry Lawson (poem, 1889)
- "An Old Master" by C. J. Dennis (poem, 1910)
- "Bullocky" by Judith Wright (poem, 1944)
- "Bill the Bullocky", a doggerel poem written anonymously under a pseudonym 'Bowyang York' in the late 1850s; the original inspiration for Dog on the Tuckerbox.
- Bullocky, a 1969 Australian short documentary film by the Commonwealth Film Unit

== See also ==
- Bullock cart
- Oxbow
- Ox-wagon
