= Matt Carroll (producer) =

Australian film & TV producer (born 1944)

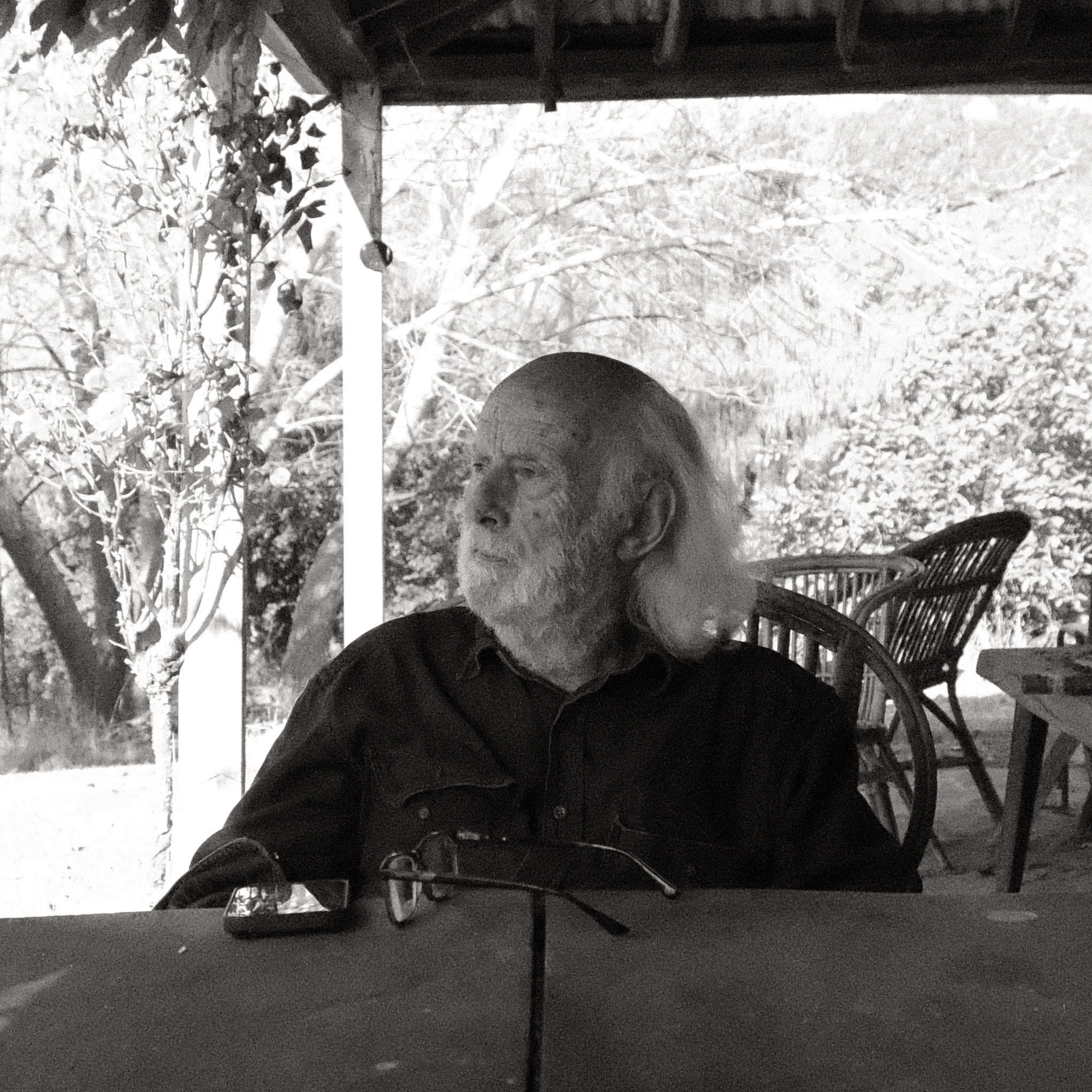
- Born: Matthew Carroll; 6 June 1944 (age 82); Sydney, New South Wales, Australia
- Education: University of New South Wales
- Occupations: Film and television producer

Matthew Carroll OBE (born 6 June 1944) is an Australian film and TV producer. He is best known for producing films since the early 1970s including Breaker Morant, Storm Boy and Sunday Too Far Away. Later, he went into television production, producing the television series G.P. for the Australian Broadcasting Corporation (ABC). He was a principal in the production house Roadshow, Coote and Carroll which produced television shows for Australian and international audiences.

== Background and early career ==
Carroll was born in 1944 in Sydney. Originally, he studied to be an architect at the University of New South Wales – where he met Jim Sharman, Brian Thomson and others – but became involved in television, working on Skippy and Spyforce while completing his degree.

He formed Kolossal Productions with Jim Sharman in 1972. The company produced Private Collection and Shirley Thompson vs. the Aliens neither of which achieved popular or critical success.

== Production career ==
Carroll joined the South Australian Film Corporation in 1973. His first significant role as producer was Sunday Too Far Away in 1975 produced with Gil Brealey. There were significant disagreements in post-production as several minutes were cut from the film, causing friction with director Ken Hannam. However, the finished film was a hit at the Cannes Film Festival, opened the Sydney Film Festival and won the Golden Reel at the 1974–75 Australian Film Awards.

Storm Boy, produced the next year, was another critical success. It was a popular children's film both in Australia and Britain and won a medal at the Moscow Film Festival in 1977 for Best Children's Film. Carroll produced Breaker Morant in 1980 which was another critical success. Carroll left the South Australian Film Corporation in 1983.

=== Roadshow Coote Carroll ===
In 1984, Carroll joined the television production company Roadshow Coote Carroll as managing director. It produced Australian television series and miniseries which were sold to Australian broadcasters and to international broadcasters in the UK, the Public Broadcasting Service or cable broadcasters and to European broadcasters.

He produced the 1988 miniseries True Believers written by Bob Ellis, a dramatisation of Australian political life between 1940 and 1954. It was a particular favourite of Paul Keating who stated in his 1993 victory speech: "This is a victory for the true believers, for those who kept the faith through difficult times".

In 1992 Carroll produced the film Turtle Beach, based on the 1981 Blanche d'Alpuget book of the same name. It caused controversy in Malaysia where the Government took exception to scenes of Malays executing refugees.

Between 1989 and 1996 he produced G.P. for the ABC, which was set in an inner-Sydney suburb, with locations shot mainly in the Newtown area. It was shown on Thames Television, Central Television and Border Television in the UK from 1992. Carroll was proud of its focus on social issues. The show won a Human Rights Award in 1989 for its portrayal of a young child dying of AIDS. During his time at Roadshow Coote Carroll, he was also involved in the development of the highly acclaimed Brides of Christ set in a Sydney convent during the 1960s.

=== Independent productions ===
Carroll set up as an independent producer in 1995. His first production was the 1996 film Diana & Me starring Toni Collette, which failed to break through commercially or critically. In 1999, he produced the first series of the science fiction series Farscape as well as the film Passion: The Story of Percy Grainger. In 2003, he produced The Postcard Bandit, which was nominated for Most Outstanding Miniseries or Telemovie in the Logie Awards of 2004.
