= 3 to Go =

1971 Australian anthology film

- Title card
- Directed by: Peter Weir ("Michael"); Brian Hannant ("Judy"); Oliver Howes ("Toula")
- Written by: Peter Weir ("Michael"); Brian Hannent; Bob Ellis ("Judy"); Oliver Howes ("Toula")
- Produced by: Gil Brealey
- Starring: Mathew Burton
- Cinematography: Kerry Brown
- Edited by: Wayne LeClos
- Music by: The Cleves ("Michael"); Grahame Bond ("Judy"); Rory O'Donoghue ("Toula")
- Production company: Commonwealth Film Unit
- Distributed by: British Empire Films
- Release date: 23 February 1971
- Running time: 89 minutes
- Country: Australia
- Languages: English; Greek ("Toula")
- Budget: A$50,000

3 to Go is an Australian portmanteau film consisting of three stories— Michael, Judy, and Toula—each presenting a young Australian at a moment of decision about their future. It was the Australian government controlled Commonwealth Film Unit's first fiction feature film. The film was first shown on Australian television in February 1971.

The film won the Silver Medallion at the Australian Film Institute Awards and one of the stories, Michael, written and directed by Peter Weir, won the 1971 AFI Grand Prix Award.

== Plot ==
Young people and their personal concerns are the main theme of the three segments.

=== Michael ===
A young man, Michael, faces a choice between his wealthy middle-class parents and their middle class wealthy lifestyle and a group of radicals. The episode starts with close-quarter battle scenes near Sydney Harbour, where radical Youth Quake rebels are fighting against soldiers. We then learn that this is only a film-sequence, and that everyday life is still normal, and meet Michael who is living with his parents, but working in the city. The scenes are intercut with an expert Youth Quake panel discussion (led by Neville Trantor), discussing topics such as sex and drugs. Trouble with Judy his girlfriend leads to a counterculture montage, and Michael becomes increasingly bored with his work routine and colleagues. At a pub, he befriends an actor from the film, Grahame, and Georgina his girlfriend, and begins to experience their freewheeling lifestyle. Family life becomes increasingly mundane as he begins to seek something more. He invites them to gatecrash Judy's 21st party, leading to trouble with his parents and a stronger sense of personal conflict.

=== Judy ===
Despite the opposition of her parents and her boyfriend, Judy, a 19-year-old country girl, wants to move to the big city and leave her small town behind. Judy finds life in Tamworth mundane. Her mother has concerns about her welfare, her unambitious country boyfriend Mike, and the daily routine. Her plan is to make her own life in Sydney, and she seeks advice from her work-friend Margie, and wishes her boyfriend was more like Margie's fiancé David. At the drive-in theater, showing a double-feature (Flaming Star and Garden of Evil), she informs Mike of her plans. He becomes disenchanted, failing to understand her motivations, and a few weeks later, after Judy searches for work in The Sydney Morning Herald, and with the help of her boss, the segment ends as she boards a train for Sydney and her new home is revealed: room 305.

=== Toula ===
In it, a young Greek woman falls for an Australian man despite the opposition of her conservative Greek parents and family. Toula lives in a row house in Sydney (within the Greek community) with her parents, grandmother, and younger brother Stavros, all of whom arrived in Australia 4.5 years ago. Toula and her best friend Assimina work at a clothes factory, and their families often meet and socialise together. Assimina has an Australian boyfriend, a university student named Rick, but she is unable to tell anyone except Toula about him—rumours however reach her brother Nick, which leads to a physical altercation in the house. Tension exists at Toula's house too, with Stavros, who is unemployed and listless, and his father's desire for him to go to university. As a community dance, she meets John—then the four go on a double-date to see Easy Rider in the theatre. Easter arrives, and the community celebrates a midnight mass with candles in the Greek Orthodox Cathedral of St. Sophia in Paddington, and the family head off home together.

== Cast ==
=== Michael ===
- Matthew Burton as Michael
- Grahame Bond as Grahame
- Peter Colville as Neville Trantor
- Georgina West as Georgina
- Betty Lucas as mother
- Judy McBurney as Judy

=== Judy ===
- Judy Morris as Judy
- Serge Lazareff as Mike
- Mary Ann Severne as Margaret
- Gary Day as David
- Penny Ramsey as Heather
- Wendy Playfair as Mother
- Brian Anderson as Father
- Cliff Neale as Mr Vickery

=== Toula ===
- Rita Ioannou as Toula
- Erica Crowne as Assimina
- Andrew Pappas as Stavros
- Joe Hasham as John
- Gabriel Battikha as Nick
- Ther Coulouris as father
- Ketty Coulouris as mother
- Yaya Laudeas as grandmother
- Lex Marinos as man at dance

== Production ==
Assistance was provided by the then Commonwealth Film Unit (now Screen Australia). Michael was filmed in late 1969 on in black and white 16mm but blown up to 35mm; the other two films were filmed in early 1970 on 35mm. The director of photography was Kerry Brown, and the producer Gil Brealey.

The sale to Australian television apparently recovered A$15,000 of the A$50,000 budget.

== Music ==
The music for Michael was written and played by the Cleves, a New Zealand band popular in Sydney at the time, and released in January 1970 as an EP called Music from Michael. Released by Festival Records, the tracks were:

- A1 – To-Day / Don't Turn Your Back / To-Day / Thirties / To-Day
- A2 – Merivale / Whispers
- B1 – Nowhere / Down on the Farm / Don't Turn Your Back

The music for Toula included "Mozart Chamber Music" edited by James McCarthy.

== Release ==
Three to Go was shown on ATN-7 and HSV-7 on 23 February 1971.

It was distributed by British Empire Films.

== Reception ==
Sydney Film Festival director David Stratton, in an unsolicited review published by Variety, called it "a large step towards a valid, wholly-indigenous, local film production". He felt that Michael was the least successful segment being "too trendy, frenetic and superficial" and that Toula was the best, being "moving and enlightening". The three segments in the trilogy had "relatively little thematic or stylistic connection", apart from what might be called an ulterior, "issue-based" motive to draw lessons about life in Australia, and a desire to patch together a feature film by using a portmanteau structure.
