= Sunday Too Far Away =

- DVD Cover
- Directed by: Ken Hannam
- Written by: John Dingwall
- Produced by: Gil Brealey; Matt Carroll
- Starring: Jack Thompson; Robert Bruning; Reg Lye; Max Cullen; Peter Cummins; John Ewart
- Cinematography: Geoff Burton
- Edited by: Rod Adamson
- Music by: Patrick Flynn
- Production company: South Australian Film Corporation
- Distributed by: Roadshow Film Distributors
- Release date: 15 June 1975
- Running time: 94 minutes
- Country: Australia
- Language: English
- Budget: A$300,000
- Box office: A$1.356 million (Australia)

Sunday Too Far Away is a 1975 Australian drama film directed by Ken Hannam. It belongs to the Australian Film Renaissance or the Australian New Wave, which occurred during that decade.

The film is set on a sheep station in the Australian outback in 1955 and its action concentrates on the shearers' reactions to a threat to their bonuses and the arrival of non-union labour.

Acclaimed for its understated realism of the work, camaraderie and general life of the shearer, Jack Thompson plays the knock-about Foley, a heavy drinking gun shearer (talented professional sheep shearer), and while he makes a play for the station owner's daughter Sheila (Lisa Peers), the film is a presentation of various aspects of Australian male culture and not a romance; the film's title itself is reputedly the lament of an Australian shearer's wife: "Friday night [he's] too tired; Saturday night too drunk; Sunday, too far away".

Sunday Too Far Away won three 1975 Australian Film Institute awards: Best Film, Best Actor in a Leading Role and Best Actor in a Supporting Role.

== Plot ==
In 1955, gun shearer Foley joins a new shearing team sharing a room with Old Garth, a once great shearer who is now a drunk. Foley and his team battle to get in a new cook, Old Garth dies and Foley befriends the grazier's daughter. Foley loses his status as top shearer to Arthur Black and blows most of his money gambling. The shearers go on strike and Foley and his team get involved in a brawl with non-union labour.

== Cast ==
- Jack Thompson as Foley
- Max Cullen as Tim King
- Robert Bruning as Tom West
- Jerry Thomas as Basher
- Peter Cummins as Arthur Black
- John Ewart as Ugly
- Sean Scully as Beresford
- Reg Lye as Old Garth
- Graham Smith as Jim the Learner
- Laurie Rankin as Old Station Hand
- Lisa Peers as Sheila
- Philip Ross as Mr Dawson
- Ken Shorter as Frankie Davis
- Gregory Apps as Michael Simpson
- John Hargreaves (uncredited)

== Production ==
The film was the first feature produced by the South Australian Film Corporation. They wanted to make a film about the Gallipoli campaign and considered a co-production with Crawford Productions. John Dingwall was signed to write it. However the film fell through when Crawfords fell out with the SAFC. Dingwall, still under contract to them, proposed instead a treatment called Shearers, based on his brother-in-law, who was a shearer. Matt Carroll at the SAFC was particularly enthusiastic and recruited Ken Hannam to direct. The original treatment concerned the 1956 shearer's strike. This ended up being condensed greatly.

Among the investors in the movie were the Australian Film Development Corporation.

Shooting began in May 1974 and took place near Port Augusta and Quorn in South Australia. It encountered rains and flood and was completed behind schedule in May.

The original cut of the film was over two hours. A number of scenes were reduced during post production, including the removal of Foley's romance with the grazier's daughter, and shifting Foley having a car crash from the end of the movie to the beginning. This caused a great deal of conflict between Ken Hannam, Gil Brearley and Matt Carroll.

== Release ==
Before being released, the film won four major prizes at the Australian Film Awards in March 1975 and was selected for screening in the Directors' Fortnight at Cannes Film Festival in May.

Sunday Too Far Away grossed $1,356,000 at the box office in Australia ($10.8 million in 2022 dollars). The film's success after Petersen confirmed Jack Thompson's status as the biggest movie star in Australian cinema at the time.

== See also ==
- Cinema of Australia
- South Australian Film Corporation
