= Jack and Jill: A Postscript =

- Directed by: Phillip Adams; Brian Robinson
- Written by: Phillip Adams; Brian Robinson
- Produced by: Phillip Adams; Brian Robinson
- Starring: Anthony Ward; Judy Leech
- Narrated by: Rosemary Adams; Jim Berinson
- Cinematography: Phillip Adams; Brian Robinson
- Edited by: Phillip Adams; Brian Robinson
- Music by: Peter Best
- Distributed by: Columbia Pictures
- Release date: 29 October 1970
- Running time: 67 mins
- Country: Australia
- Language: English
- Budget: $10,000 or $24,000

Jack and Jill: A Postscript is a 1970 Australian film.

== Plot ==
Jill, a kindergarten teacher who lives with her parents, meets Jack, a biker. The two fall in love but are unable to reconcile their differences, with tragic results.

== Cast ==
- Anthony Ward as Jack Anderson
- Judy Leech attas Gillian O'Keefe
- Lindsay How as Christopher
- Stanley Randall as Stan
- Jean Higgs as Mrs Whelan
- Phyllis Freeman as Mrs O'Keefe
- Alan Higgs as Mr O'Keefe
- Gerry Humphries as Gerry
- Bob Cornish as television announcer
- Gordon Rumph as minister
- Sylvia Threlfall as minister's wife
- Ray Watts as the singer

== Production ==
The script was originally devised in 1964 as a series of sketches where nursery rhymes provided commentary on modern suburbia. It took several years to film and shooting finished in mid 1969.

== Release ==
The film won a silver award at the 1969 Australian Film Awards and screened at a number of festivals. It was released commercially by Columbia Pictures.
