= The Die-Hard - The Legend of Lasseter's Lost Gold Reef =

- Directed by: David Crocker
- Written by: Ivan Smith; Jocelyn Smith
- Produced by: Don Philps; David Crocker
- Narrated by: James Mason
- Edited by: Tim Wellburn
- Music by: Richard Connolly
- Release date: 1969
- Running time: 46 min
- Country: Australia
- Language: English

The Die-Hard - The Legend of Lasseter's Lost Gold Reef, also referred to as The Die-Hard is a 1969 Australian documentary film directed by David Crocker and produced by Venture Films. It recreated Harold Lasseter's 1930 expedition searching for his reef of gold. The film won the 1969 Australian Film Institute Gold Award for Best Documentary and a Department of Interior Award. It was entered in the documentary section of the 1969 Cannes Film Festival.
