= Phil Hunt =

Australian rules footballer

Personal information
- Full name: Philip Richard Hunt
- Born: 10 January 1884; Moonta, South Australia
- Died: 9 June 1946 (aged 62); Bendigo, Victoria
- Original team: Bendigo

Playing career^{1}
Years	Club	Games (Goals)
1907	Melbourne	8 (0)
- ^{1} Playing statistics correct to the end of 1907.

Philip Richard Hunt (10 January 1884 – 9 June 1946) was an Australian rules footballer who played with Melbourne in the Victorian Football League (VFL).
