= Gil Brealey =

Gil Brealey AO
- Born: 9 April 1932; Melbourne, Victoria, Australia
- Died: 1 April 2018 (aged 85)
- Education: University of Melbourne
- Occupations: Film producer, director

Gilbert John Brealey AO (9 April 1932 – 1 April 2018) was an Australian television and film director, producer and writer.

Brealey was born in Melbourne, and studied at the University of Melbourne, where he made his first amateur films around the age of 20. He was a member of the Melbourne University film society and was a speaker at the Eisenstein Weekend organised by the WEA Film Study Group in October 1963. He began his directing career in television in the 1960s with the Australian Broadcasting Commission (later the Australian Broadcasting Corporation), where he worked for approximately eight years. His notable credits there include Australia's first science fiction TV series The Stranger (1964–65) and the 1965 TV miniseries adaptation of the George Johnston novel My Brother Jack. He wrote and directed a satire Say Bow Wow. He directed three films for the Intertel series on Japan, Israel, and Malta.

He had a brief exchange visit with Universal Pictures in 1968, and in 1969 head of production Richard Mason approached him to join the Commonwealth Film Unit (later Film Australia, now Screen Australia) as a documentary film producer. His credits include the AFI Award-winning documentary short Bullocky and the three-part 'omnibus' film Three To Go (1971), which includes segments by emerging directors Peter Weir and Brian Hannett.

In 1972 he was appointed founding director/chairman of the South Australian Film Corporation, a role he held until 1976. In this time Brealey co-produced the acclaimed Sunday Too Far Away (1975), the film that launched the career of actor Jack Thompson.

In 1976 Brealey was appointed Officer of the Order of Australia for his services to the Australian Film Industry.

In 1977, he completed a report on film production by the Tasmanian government, and was appointed founding chair of the Tasmanian Film Corporation. In this role he co-produced the film Manganinnie.

In 1984, Brealey directed Annie's Coming Out (released in America as Test of Love) for Film Australia. The movie won the 1984 Australian Film Institute awards for best film, best female actor, and best adapted screenplay.

In a career of 42 years in the Australian film industry he wrote, produced or directed one hundred productions and won the top prize at the AFI awards five times.

Brealey died on 1 April 2018, aged 85.

== Select credits ==
- Flashpoint (1972)
- Sunday Too Far Away (1975)
- Annie's Coming Out (1984)
