= List of Australian films of 1976 =

== 1976 ==
Title	Director	Cast	Genre	Notes
The Alternative	Paul Eddey	Wendy Hughes, Tony Bonner, Carla Hoogeveen, Peter Adams, Alwyn Kurts, Ken Goodlet, Betty Lucas, Don Reid, Anne Haddy	Drama TV film	
Arena	Eric Taylor	John Meillon, Ray Barrett, Chelsea Brown, John Ewart, Vincent Ball, Max Meldrum, David Nettheim, Brian Blain, Patrick Amer, Max Osbiston, Julie Hamilton	Drama ABC TV film / ABC TV pilot	
Barnaby and Me	Norman Panama	Sid Caesar, Juliet Mills, Sally Boyden, Hugh Keays-Byrne, Rangi Nichols, James Condon, Ivar Kants, Bruce Spence, Terry Bader, John Newcombe	Comedy / Drama ABC TV film US Co-production	
Barney	David S. Waddington	Brett Maxworthy, Sean Kramer, Lionel Long, Spike Milligan, Jack Allen, Robert Quilter, Mike Preston	Adventure / Family Feature film	IMDb aka Lost In The Wild
Betty Blokk-buster Follies	Peter Batey	Reg Livermore	Comedy / Musical	IMDb
Bluey	Graeme Arthur	Lucky Grills, Gerda Nicolson, John Diedrich, Victoria Quilter, Terry Gill, Richard Meikle, Briony Behets, Keith Eden, Paul Young, Gil Tucker, Max Bruch, Lew Luton, Judy McBurney, Leila Hayes, Bethany Lee, Billie Hammerberg, Mackie Smetana	Drama / Thriller TV film / TV Pilot to series (1976-1977)	
Break of Day	Kevin Hannam	Sara Kestleman, Andrew McFarlane, Ingrid Mason, Tony Barry, John Bell, Maurie Fields, Eileen Chapman, Dennis Olsen, Geraldine Turner	Drama Feature film	IMDb
The Bushranger	Federico Chentrens	Leonard Teale, Kate Fitzpatrick, John Hamblin, Kevin Wilson, Max Osbiston, Phillip Ross	Drama TV film	
Caddie	Donald Crombie	Helen Morse, Takis Emmanuel, Jack Thompson, Jacki Weaver, Melissa Jaffer, Ron Blanchard, Drew Forsythe, Kirrily Nolan, Lynette Curran, June Salter, John Ewart, John Gaden, Mary Mackay, Lucky Grills, Robyn Nevin, Pat Evison, Willie Fennell, Jack Allen, Vivienne Garrett	Drama / Romance Feature film	IMDb
Chopper Squad	Simon Wincer	Dennis Grosvenor, Robert Coleby, Eric Oldfield, Rebecca Gilling, Graham Rouse, Tony Hughes, Tony Bonner, Hugh Keays-Byrne, Terry Camilleri, Max Osbiston, Kevin Healey, Gordon Piper	Action / Adventure TV film / TV Pilot to series (1978-1979)	
Deathcheaters	Brian Trenchard Smith	John Hargreaves, Grant Page, Margaret Gerrard, Noel Ferrier, Wallas Eaton, Roger Ward, Ralph Cotterill, Judith Woodroofe	Action / Adventure Feature film	
The Devil's Playground	Fred Schepisi	Arthur Dignam, Nick Tate, Simon Burke, Charles McCallum, John Frawley, Jonathan Hardy, Gerry Duggan, Sheila Florance	Drama Feature film	IMDb
Do I Have to Kill My Child?	Donald Crombie	Jacki Weaver, Brendon Lunney, Betty Lucas, Willie Fennell, Cecily Poulson, John Orcsik, Lorna Leslie, Jeremy Letts	Short TV film	
Don's Party	Bruce Beresford	John Hargreaves, Jeanie Drynan, Ray Barrett, Graeme Blundell, Graham Kennedy, Pat Bishop, Clare Binney, Harold Hopkins, Veronica Lang	Comedy / Drama Feature film	IMDb, Entered into the 27th Berlin International Film Festival
Double Dealer	Allan Dickes	David Calcott, Phil Avalon, Guy Peniston-Bird, Tony Fields, Sharyn Smith, Michael Farcomini, Bob Lee, Edward Leong, Frank Love, Lorna Leslie, Judy Mathews, Michelle Napier, Harriet Whitehouse, Rick Teodo, Joe Watson, Suzanne Hunt, Mike Lyon, Rosalind Richards, John Bennet, Eric Reade, Michelle Carrol, Sue Church, Billy Dyer, Bob Burdock	TV film	
Eliza Fraser	Tim Burstall	Susannah York, Trevor Howard, Noel Ferrier, John Castle, John Waters, Abigail, Charles Tingwell, Gerard Kennedy, Arna-Maria Winchester	Drama Feature film	IMDb
End Play	Tim Burstall	George Mallaby, John Waters, Kevin Goodlet, Charles Tingwell, Belinda Giblin, Adrian Wright, Delvene Delaney, Robert Hewett, Kevin Miles	Mystery / Thriller Feature film	IMDb
Fantasm	Richard Bruce (alias for Richard Franklin)		Erotica Documentary Feature film	IMDb
The Fourth Wish	Don Chaffey	John Meillon, Robert Bettles, Robyn Nevin, Michael Craig, Fred "Cul" Cullen, Ron Haddrick, Brian Anderson, Judy Dick, Julie Dawson, Anne Haddy, Max Wearing, Don Crosby, Julie Hamilton, Brian James, Les Foxcroft, Vivean Gray	Drama Family Feature film	IMDb
Goodbye, Norma Jean				IMDb
The Haunting of Hewie Dowker	Simon Wincer	John Waters, Kate Fitzpatrick, Donald MacDonald, Camilla Rowntree, Fred "Cul" Cullen, Tim Elliot, Tony Barry, Ron Haddrick	Thriller / Mystery TV film / TV Pilot	
Is There Anybody There?	Peter Maxwell	George Lazenby, Wendy Hughes, Tina Grenville, Stuart Wagstaff, Chantal Contouri, Patrick Ward, Gordon McDougall, Joan Bruce, Enid Lorimer	Mystery / Thriller TV film	
Illuminations	Paul Cox	Gabriella Tresk, Elke Neidhardt, Tony Llewellyn-Jones, Norman Kaye, Alan Money, Athol Shmith, Tibor Markus, Sheila Florance	Drama Feature film	IMDb
Image of Death	Kevin Dobson	Cathy Paine, Cheryl Waters, Tony Bonner, Barry Pierce, Penne Hackforth-Jones, Sheila Helpmann, Max Meldrum	Mystery / Thriller TV film	IMDb
Jeremy and Teapot	Briann Kearney	Patrick Thompson, Brian Syron, Jack Thompson, Bunkie, Ann McCann, Beverly Thompson, Leona King, Peter Drury, Irene Walls, Jon Darling	Short fantasy	IMDb (Cinema Papers "Women in Film – Briann Kearney" Jan.Feb. 1982 : 36–37) Winner – Best Film – Tucson Women's Film & Video Festival USA 1986
Leisure				IMDb
Let the Balloon Go	Oliver Howes	Robert Bettles, Jan Kingsbury, Ben Gabriel, Bruce Spence, Ken Goodlet, Ray Barrett, Nigel Lovell, John Ewart	Family Feature film	IMDb
Mad Dog Morgan	Philippe Mora	Dennis Hopper, Jack Thompson, Bill Hunter, David Gulpilil, Frank Thring, Michael Pate, John Hargreaves, Graeme Blundell, Wallas Eaton, Liddy Clark, Peter Cummins, John Derum, Norman Kaye, Hugh Keays-Byrne	Action / Drama Feature film	IMDb
Murcheson Creek	Terry Bourke	Mark Edwards, Sandra Lee Paterson, Abigail, Gordon McDougall, Philippa Baker, Lew Luton, Rowena Wallace, Keith Lee, Cornelia Frances, Dennis Miller, Anne Lambert, John Orcsik, Toshiro Bourke Jnr, Alan Cinis, Robert Quilter, Judith Roberts, Ben Huber, Lara Huber, Roger Cox, Susan Fox	Mystery / Thriller TV film	
No Room to Run	Robert Michael Lewis	Richard Benjamin, Paula Prentiss, Barry Sullivan, Noel Ferrier, Ray Barrett, Anne Haddy, Fred "Cul" Cullen, Roger Ward	Drama / Thriller ABC TV film US-Co-production	
The Olive Tree	Edgar Metcalfe	John Adam, Alan Cassell, Faith Clayton, Jenny McNae, Leith Taylor, Robert van Mackelenburg, Richard Williams, Pat Skevington	Feature film	
Oz	Chris Löfvén	Joy Dunstan, Bruce Spence, Graham Matters, Bruce Spence, Michael Carman, Robin Ramsay, Gary Waddell, Paula Maxwell	Musical Feature film	IMDb
Queensland	John Ruane	John Flaus, Bob Karl, Alison Bird, Tom Broadbridge, Jack Mobbs, Gary Metcalf, Les Carter, Patricia Condon	Short Feature film	IMDb
Secret Doors		Beryl Cheers, Rebecca Gilling, Gerard Maguire, Edward Ogden, John Orcsik, Max Osbiston, Norman Yemm	Mystery / Thriller TV film	
Shay Gap				IMDb
Storm Boy	Henri Safran	Greg Rowe, Peter Cummins, David Gulpilil, Judy Dick, Tony Allison, Michael Moody, Graham Dow, Paul Smith	Drama	IMDb
The Stuntmen				IMDb
Stunt Rock	Brian Trenchard-Smith	Grant Page	Documentary Feature film	
Summer of Secrets	Jim Sharman	Arthur Dignam, Rufus Collins, Nell Campbell, Andrew Sharp, Kate Fitzpatrick, Jude Kuring		IMDb
Sunshine and Shadows: 70 Years of Australian Cinema				IMDb
Surrender in Paradise	Peter Cox	Errol O'Neill, Ross Gilbert, Rod Wissler, Bill Reynolds, Carolyn Howard, Jeff Blow, Harry Gibbs, Gaye Poole	Comedy Feature film	IMDb
Taggart's Treasure	Burt Topper	Don Reid, David Gulpilil, Rowena Wallace, Michael Duffield, Frank Wilson, Sandy Gore, Peter Williamson, Brian James	TV film US-Australian co-production	
The Trespassers	John Duigan	Judy Morris, Briony Behets, John Derum, Hugh Keays-Byrne, Peter Carmody, Chris Haywood, Max Gillies, John Orcsik, Syd Conabere, John Frawley	Drama / Romance Feature film	IMDb
Tubular Swells				IMDb
The Understudy	Eric Luithle	John McTernan, Jeanie Drynan, Don Barkham, Graham Pitts, Ivar Kants, Robin Bowering	Short film	
We Aim to Please	Robin Laurie, Margot Nash		Short	IMDb

== See also ==
- 1976 in Australia
- 1976 in Australian television
