= List of Australian films of 1978 =

== 1978 ==
Title	Director	Cast	Genre	Notes
The ABC of Love and Sex: Australia Style	John Lamond	Narrators: Sandy Gore, Michael Cole, Katie Morgan, Robyn Bartly, Leon Cossack, John Michael Howson,	Erotica / Documentary Feature film	
A Good Thing Going	Arch Nicholson	John Hargreaves, Veronica Lang, Chris Haywood, Tina Bursill, Sandra Lee Paterson, Lynne Porteous, Miles Buchanan, Simone Buchanan	Drama / Romance TV film	
At Uluru	Corinne Cantrill		Avant-Garde	IMDb
Because He's My Friend	Ralph Nelson	Keir Dullea, Karen Black, Jack Thompson, Don Reid, Tom Oliver, Barbara Stephens, Warwick Poulsen, Adam Gibson, Matthew O'Sullivan, Tony Wager, June Salter, Ray Meagher, Michael Long, Tom McCarthy, Kevin Howard, Barry Donnelly, Alan Faulkner, Ian Dyson, Hugh Logan, Will Barker	Drama TV film US Co-production	aka Love Under Pressure
Bit Part	Eric Taylor	John Meillon, Vincent Ball, Jennifer Claire, Noni Hazlehurst, Noel Trevarthen, Judy Nunn, Max Cullen, Wendy Playfair, Stuart Wagstaff	Drama ABC TV film	aka ABC Teleplay
Blue Fin	Carl Schultz	Hardy Krüger, Greg Rowe, John Jarratt, Liddy Clark, Elspeth Ballantyne, Hugh Keays-Byrne, Ralph Cotterill, John Frawley, Max Cullen	Adventure / Family / Drama Feature film	IMDb
The Chant of Jimmie Blacksmith	Fred Schepisi	Tommy Lewis, Angela Punch McGregor, Ray Barrett, Freddy Reynolds, Elizabeth Alexander, Bryan Brown, Jack Thompson, Ruth Cracknell	Drama Feature film	IMDb, 3 wins & 10 nominations. Entered into the 1978 Cannes Film Festival
Demolition	Kevin Dobson	John Waters, Fred Steele, Keith Lee, Vincent Ball, Belinda Giblin, Donald MacDonald, Wallas Eaton, Alexander Archdale, Tracey Lee, Mercia Deane-Johns	Drama / Thriller TV film	
Felicity	John Lamond	Glory Annen, Chris Milne, Joni Flynn, Jody Hanson, Marilyn Rodgers, John Michael Howson	Erotica / Adventure / Romance Feature film	
Hospitals Don't Burn Down	Brian Trenchard-Smith	Jeanie Drynan, Mark Edwards, Ray Marshall	Short Film	IMDb
In Search of Anna	Esben Storm	Richard Moir, Judy Morris, Chris Haywood, Bill Hunter, Gary Waddell, Ian Nimmo, Alex Taifer, Maurie Fields	Mystery / Drama Feature film	IMDb
The Irishman	Donald Crombie	Michael Craig, Robyn Nevin, Simon Burke, Gerard Kennedy, Lou Brown, Tony Barry, Vincent Ball, Tui Lorraine Bow, Andrew Maguire, Roger Ward, Bryan Brown	Drama / Romance Feature film	IMDb
The Island of Nevawuz	Paul Williams	Carole-Ann Aylett, Brian Hannan, Hardy Stow	Animation / Family	IMDb
Jenny	Jan Sharp			IMDb
The Last Tasmanian	Tom Haydon	Leo McKern, Jim Allen, Rhys Jones	Documentary / Drama / History	IMDb; Co-production with France
Letter to a Friend	Sonia Hofmann		Short	IMDb
Letters from Poland	Sophia Turkiewicz	Basia Bonkowski, Martin Vaughan, Jessica O'Donnell	Short	IMDb
Little Boy Lost	Terry Bourke	Lorna Lesley, John Jarratt, John Hargreaves, Tony Elliot, David Gulpilil, Tony Barry, Nathan Dawes, Les Foxcroft, Brian Anderson	Drama Feature film	IMDb
Long Weekend	Colin Eggleston	John Hargreaves, Briony Behets, Mike McEwen, Michael Aitkens, Roy Day, Sue Kiss von Soly	Horror / Mystery / Thriller Feature film	IMDb
Money Movers	Bruce Beresford	Terence Donovan, Tony Bonner, Ed Devereaux, Bryan Brown, Frank Wilson, Lucky Grills, Charles Tingwell, Alan Cassell, Allan Penney, Candy Raymond, Jeanie Drynan	Crime / Action / Thriller Feature film	IMDb
Mouth to Mouth	John Duigan	Kim Krejus, Sonia Peat, Ian Gilmour, Sergio Frazzetto, Michael Carman, Janice Hayes, Shona Stephens, Walter Pym	Drama Feature film	IMDb
Newsfront	Phillip Noyce	Bill Hunter, Wendy Hughes, Gerard Kennedy, Chris Haywood, Angela Punch, Bryan Brown, Drew Forsythe, John Ewart, John Clayton, Don Crosby, John Dease, Tony Barry, Lorna Lesley, Steve Bisley, Kit Taylor, Les Foxcroft, Bruce Spence, Mark Holden, Anne Haddy	Drama / History Feature film	IMDb
The Night, the Prowler	Jim Sharman	Ruth Cracknell, John Frawley, Kerry Walker, John Derum, Terry Camilleri, Paul Chubb, Alexander Archdale, Maggie Kirkpatrick	Drama / Thriller Feature film	IMDb
The Night Nurse	Igor Auzins	Davina Whitehouse, Kay Taylor, Gary Day, Kate Fitzpatrick, Max Meldrum, Ted Howell, Reg Gillam,	Horror / Thriller TV film	IMDb
Patrick	Richard Franklin	Susan Penhaligon, Robert Helpmann, Robert Thompson, Rod Mullinar, Bruce Barry, Julia Blake, Helen Hemingway, Frank Wilson, Maria Mercedes	Horror / Thriller Feature film	IMDb
Ripkin	Frank Arnold	Belinda Giblin, Olivia Hamnett, Robert Hughes, Keith Lee, Vince Martin, Garick Mather, David Nettheim	Thriller ABC TV film / Teleplay	Screened as 'Stuart Wagstaff's World Playhouse' series
The Scalp Merchant	Howard Rubie	John Waters, Elizabeth Alexander, Ron Haddrick, Cameron Mitchell, Ric Hutton, Margaret Nelson, Joan Sydney, Helen Hough	Drama / Thriller TV film	
Size 10	Sarah Gibson, Susan Lambert	Robyn Archer, Anny Bremner, Laurie Denton	Documentary / Short	IMDb
Solo	Tony Williams	Vincent Gil, Lisa Peers, Tony Williams, Martyn Sanderson, Perry Armstrong, Max Fernie, Jock Spence, Frances Edmond, Davina Whitehouse	Drama / Romance Feature Film, First Australia-New Zealand Co-production	IMDb
The Sound of Love	John Power	John Jarratt, Celia de Burgh, George Ogilvie, John Beynham, Maree D'Arcy, Rob George, Pamela George, Don Barker, Graham Duckett	Drama / Romance TV film	
Stunt Rock	Brian Trenchard-Smith	Grant Page, Monique van de Ven, Margaret Gerard	Action / Drama / Music	IMDb
Temperament Unsuited	Ken Cameron	Steve J. Spears, Robyn Nevin, Deborah Kennedy, Tony Sheldon, Victoria Nicholls	Short Film	IMDb
Third Person Plural	James Ricketson	Bryan Brown, Linden Wilkinson, Margaret Cameron, George Shevtsov, Elaine Hudson, Alex Kovacs	Drama Feature film	IMDb
Weekend of Shadows	Tom Jeffrey	John Waters, Wyn Roberts, Melissa Jaffer, Barbara West, Graeme Blundell, Bill Hunter, Graham Rouse, Keith Lee, Kit Taylor, Tony Barry, Les Foxcroft, Bryan Brown	Crime / Mystery Feature film	IMDb

== See also ==
- 1978 in Australia
- 1978 in Australian television
