= Kung Fu Killers =

- Directed by: Brian Trenchard-Smith
- Starring: Grant Page; Angela Mao; George Lazenby
- Release date: 1974
- Running time: 72 minutes
- Country: Australia
- Language: English
- Budget: A$13,000
- Box office: A$18,000

Kung Fu Killers is a 1974 Australian documentary directed by Brian Trenchard-Smith.

== Plot ==
Australian stuntman Grant Page travels to Hong Kong to find Bruce Lee's successor and looks at the cultural phenomenon that Asian martial arts has become in the West. He talks to actors such as Angela Mao, Stuart Whitman and George Lazenby – who were all making movies in Hong Kong at the time – and fights Carter Wong twice.

== Production ==
Brian Trenchard Smith had made a popular one hour documentary World of Kung Fu (1973) for Channel Seven, which enabled him to sell this sequel to Channel Nine. Earlier he also had made a documentary The Stuntmen with Grant Page and become his manager; Page was given the lead.

Kung Fu Killers was shot in Hong Kong and featured clips from Golden Harvest movies. This developed contacts that Trenchard Smith later used to make The Man from Hong Kong (1975). He sold the film to Channel Nine for $18,000. Trenchard-Smith later commented that his intentions with the film "were simple":

Commence the process of launching Grant Page to local audiences as an Australian personality with an [sic] unique gift. Have him trigger a lot of Asian action sequences, which were really entertaining. Come in on budget. Turn a profit... Viewed 35 years later, KFK is a long trailer for Asian Cinema masquerading as a Documentary Special. Somewhat scrappy and heavy-handed in places too. But now, with the advantage of 20/20 hindsight, it is a really interesting time capsule. Grant is engaging as ever, and the kung fu combats are lively. Nine made a spectacular promo, and were rewarded with ratings and repeats for a while, particularly in Adelaide, Grant's home town. Mission accomplished.
