= Andrew Airlie =

Scottish-born Canadian actor

- Born: September 18, 1961 (age 65); Glasgow, Scotland
- Occupation: Actor
- Years active: 1990–present

Andrew Airlie (born September 18, 1961) is a Scottish-born Canadian actor.

== Early life ==
Andrew Airlie was born in Glasgow, Scotland on September 18, 1961.

== Career ==
Airlie has starred in television series including Breaker High and his TV credits include guest starring in popular television shows such as Monk, Smallville, Stargate SG-1, The X-Files and Fringe. He had television regular roles as John Oliver, the protagonist Sam (Bret Harrison)'s father, on the series, Reaper, which aired from 2007 until 2009, and as Mission Control Commander Mike Goss on the series Defying Gravity in 2009.

Airlie's best-known film role was as Michael Corman in Final Destination 2. He portrays Carrick Grey, father of Christian Grey (Jamie Dornan), in the Fifty Shades of Grey films.

== Filmography ==
=== Film ===
Year	Title	Role	Notes
1990	The Freshman	Mall Patron #5	
1991	White Light	Police Artist	
1993	The Crush	Dr. Pollard	
1993	Look Who's Talking Now	Co-Pilot	
1994	Flinch	William	
1995	Hard Evidence	Adam Russell	
1995	Power of Attorney	Adams	
1996	Homeward Bound II: Lost in San Francisco	Tucker's Dad	
1996	Fear	Alex McDowell	
1996	Downhill Willie	Jack Murphy	
1998	Nightmare Street	Jim	
2001	The Safety of Objects	Bruce Jennings	
2002	Greenmail	Alan Clarke	
2002	Trapped	Holden	
2003	Final Destination 2	Michael Corman	
2003	Shattered Glass	Alec Shumpert	
2004	Going the Distance	Jerry	
2005	Fantastic Four	Compound Doctor	
2005	Neverwas	Head Editor	
2006	The Butterfly Effect 2	Ron Callahan	
2007	Normal	Dale Reichert	
2009	Case 39	Doctor	
2010	Dear Mr. Gacy	Professor Harris	
2011	Apollo 18	Mission Control (voice)	
2011	50/50	Dr. Ross	
2012	The Company You Keep	FBI Senior Agent	
2014	Big Eyes	Rich Man	
2015	Fifty Shades of Grey	Carrick Grey	
2017	Fifty Shades Darker	Carrick Grey	
2018	Fifty Shades Freed	Carrick Grey	

=== Television ===
Year	Title	Role	Notes
1991	The Hidden Room	Noah	Episode: "Little Nightmares, Little Dreams"
1991	The Commish	Tom Atkins	Episode: "No Greater Gift"
1992	Nightmare Cafe	Tennis Pro	Episode: "Dying Well Is the Best Revenge"
1993	Cobra	Robert "Scandal" Jackson Sr.	2 episodes
1993, 1996	The X-Files	Rob / Attorney	2 episodes
1993–1997	Hurricanes	Andy Stone (voice)	65 episodes
1994	Snowbound: The Jim and Jennifer Stolpa Story	Dr. Bonaldi	TV movie
1994	Lonesome Dove: The Series	Soldier	Episode: "Last Stand"
1994	The Odyssey	Steve	4 episodes
1994	Robin's Hoods	Assistant DA	Episode: "Boy Meets Girl"
1995	M.A.N.T.I.S.	Dr. Wallace Allen	Episode: "The Sea Wasp"
1995	Frostfire	Bruce Gorman	TV movie
1995	Hawkeye	Lt. Humphries	Episode: "The Traitor"
1995	Trust in Me	Dan	TV movie
1996	Abducted: A Father's Love	Derrick Coles	TV movie
1996	Dead Ahead	Dennis Chapman	TV movie
1996	The Limbic Region	Attorney	TV movie
1996	Two	Walter	Episode: "Black Ops"
1996	North of 60	Mike Ogden	Episode: "Fear of Flying"
1996	Kung Fu: The Legend Continues	Agent Patton	Episode: "A Shaolin Christmas"
1996, 1999	Jake and the Kid	Walter	2 episodes
1996–2002	The Outer Limits	Various	5 episodes
1997	Millenium	Dr. Willmore	Episode: "Lamentation"
1997	Doomsday Rock	Major Blaine D. Cooper	TV movie
1997	Extreme Dinosaurs	Additional voices	Episode: "Out of Time"
1997–1998	Breaker High	Captain Ballard	44 episodes
1997, 1999	Viper	Dr. Harmon / Charles Peterson	2 episodes
1998	Poltergeist: The Legacy	Edward Bishop	Episode: "The Light"
1998	Voyage of Terror	Michael	TV movie
1998	Psi Factor	John Valentine	Episode: "Heartland"
1998	Beauty	Joel	TV movie
1999	Total Recall 2070	Michael Leland	Episode: "Infiltration"
1999	Dead Man's Gun	Sean Hannigan	Episode: "The Good Chef"
1999	In the Blue Ground	Mike Ogden	TV movie
1999	As Time Runs Out	Doctor	TV movie
1999	Twice in a Lifetime	Detective David Hayes	Episode: "Quality of Mercy"
1999	Dear America: A Journey to the New World	Father	TV movie
1999–2000	First Wave	Dr. Reid / Dr. Bern Galloway	2 episodes
1999, 2002	Earth: Final Conflict	Sheriff Robert Hyland / Coach Bickwell	2 episodes
1999, 2004	Stargate SG-1	Kalen / Dr. Carmichael	2 episodes
2000	Deadlocked	Kent Hagen	TV movie
2000	Personally Yours	Stephen	TV movie
2000–2002	Mysterious Ways	Dr. McCutcheon	3 episodes
2000–2005	Da Vinci's Inquest	Lawyer / Arnie McLeod	3 episodes
2002	The Chris Isaak Show	Brad Petty	Episode: "Family Ties"
2002	Cold Squad	Premier Steed	2 episodes
2002	Wasted	Mr. Campbell	TV movie
2002	Much Ado About Whatever	John Ogilvy	2 episodes
2002	Breaking News	Senator Sandquist	Episode: "Spin Art"
2002	Monk	Shaun	Episode: "Mr. Monk Takes a Vacation"
2002	That Was Then	Tom Farrell	Episode: "The Thirty-Year Itch"
2002	Tom Stone	Malcolm	Episode: "Sunny Side of the Street"
2003	Just Cause	William Arden	Episode: "Death's Details"
2004	Gracie's Choice	Arlo Rasmussen	TV movie
2004	Jack	Michael	TV movie
2004	Bliss	John	Episode: "Badness"
2004	Smallville	Mr. Woodruff	Episode: "Memoria"
2004	Tru Calling	Dr. Frank Colvin	Episode: "D.O.A."
2004	The Days	Peter Daniels	Episode: "Day 1,412"
2004	House	Orange Man	Episode: "Pilot"
2004–2005	The 4400	Brian Moore	7 episodes
2005	The Dead Zone	Nathan Burke	Episode: "The Last Goodbye"
2005	The Hunt for the BTK Killer	Sheridan	TV movie
2005–2007	Intelligence	Don Frazer	8 episodes
2005, 2019	Supernatural	Larry Pike / Henry Whitman	2 episodes
2006	The L Word	Dr. Shapiro	2 episodes
2006	Saved	Dr. Daniel Lanier	8 episodes
2006	Eureka	Jason Anderson	Episode: "Before I Forget"
2006–2007	Whistler	Mitchell Douglas	8 episodes
2007	A Decent Proposal	John Bleekham	TV movie
2007–2009	Reaper	John Oliver	31 episodes
2008	Storm Cell	Travis	TV movie
2008	The Christmas Clause	Dave	TV movie
2009	Defying Gravity	Mike Goss	13 episodes
2009	Fringe	Dr. James Carson	Episode: "Of Human Action"
2010	Caprica	Cornell Gast	Episode: "Retribution"
2010	Hellcats	J. Gilmartin	2 episodes
2011	Collision Earth	Edward Rex	TV movie
2011	Gone	Therapist	TV movie
2011	Killer Mountain	Barton	TV movie
2011	Geek Charming	Alan Schoenfield	TV movie
2012	The Killing	Dr. Andrew Madigan	3 episodes
2012	Fairly Legal	Neal Mathews	Episode: "Borderline"
2012	The 12 Disasters of Christmas	Jude	TV movie
2012, 2014	The Haunting Hour	Dad	2 episodes
2013	She Made Them Do It	Bob Hopner	TV movie
2013	Once Upon a Time	George Darling	Episode: "Second Star to the Right"
2013	Motive	Jimmy Ramsay	Episode: "Ruthless"
2013	King & Maxwell	Doug Allen	Episode: "King's Ransom"
2013	Cedar Cove	Stan Lockhart	9 episodes
2013	Delete	Marcus Trumaine	2 episodes
2014	My Gal Sunday	President Richard Thompson	TV movie
2014	Arctic Air	Sergeant Waterhill	2 episodes
2014	Bates Motel	Mayor Rob Woodriff	Episode: "Plunge"
2014	Reign	Lord McKenzie	Episode: "Liege Lord"
2014	Intruders	Todd Crane	4 episodes
2015	A Gift of Miracles	Frank Miller	TV movie
2015	Mistresses	Father John	4 episodes
2015	The Fixer	Grant	4 episodes
2015–2016	The Romeo Section	Professor Wolfgang McGee	20 episodes
2017	Fargo	Marshal Red Vonnegut	Episode: "Who Rules the Land of Denial?"
2017	A Bramble House Christmas	Ken	TV movie
2017	The Good Doctor	Mr. Preston	Episode: "Sacrifice"
2018	Hailey Dean Mystery: 2+2=Murder	Chad Becker	TV movie
2018	Six	Aubrey Daniels	3 episodes
2018	Reunited at Christmas	Bill	TV movie
2018	Every Day Is Christmas	Jeff	TV movie
2019	Sailing Into Love	Joseph Richards	TV movie
2019	Holiday Hearts	Reed	TV movie
2021	Two Sentence Horror Stories	Arthur Spencer	Episode: "Imposter"
2021	Nancy Drew	Everett Hudson	3 episodes
2021	Aurora Teagarden Mysteries: Til Death Do Us Part	Charles	TV movie
2021	Christmas Takes Flight	Frank	TV movie
2021	Joy for Christmas	Edward	TV movie
2022	Chesapeake Shores	John Osterberg	3 episodes
2023	My Christmas Hero	Ted Ramsey	TV movie
2024	Hudson & Rex	Commander Edward Hudson	Episode: "Hudson and Son"

=== Video games ===
Year	Title	Role	Notes
1999	Mugen	Additional voices	
