= Escape Clause (disambiguation) =

An escape clause is part of a contract that allows a party to avoid having to perform the contract.

"Escape clause" may also refer to:

- "Escape Clause", a 1959 episode of The Twilight Zone
- "Escape Claus" (That's So Raven episode), 2003
- Escape Clause (film), a 1996 made-for-TV film directed by Brian Trenchard-Smith
- The Santa Clause 3: The Escape Clause, a 2006 Tim Allen movie
