= Tracy Billings =

Tracy Billings may refer to:

- Tracy Billings, character in The Hangover Part II
- Tracy Billings, character in Happy Face Murders
