= The Love Epidemic =

- Directed by: Brian Trenchard-Smith
- Written by: Brian Trenchard-Smith; Michael Laurence (comedy material)
- Produced by: Brian Trenchard-Smith
- Starring: Michael Laurence; Ros Spiers; Grant Page
- Narrated by: Derryck Barnes
- Cinematography: Russell Boyd; Greg Hunter; Stuart Fist; Ross Blake
- Edited by: Ronda MacGregor
- Production company: Hexagon Productions
- Distributed by: Roadshow Film Distributors
- Release date: 3 January 1975
- Running time: 83 minutes
- Country: Australia
- Language: English
- Budget: A$33,000
- Box office: A$367,000 (Aust)

The Love Epidemic is a 1975 Australian semi-documentary about venereal disease directed by Brian Trenchard-Smith. It incorporates clinical case studies and sex health instruction with comedy sketches.

It was shot on 16mm for $33,000 and blown up to 35mm for theatrical release.

== Cast ==
- Michael Laurence
- Ros Spiers
- Peter Reynolds
- Grant Page
- Tim Lynch
- John Ewart
- Barry Lovett
- Jane Lister
- Luda Apinys
- Ken Doyle
- Billy Thorpe and the Aztecs

== Release ==
In January 1975 two members of the cast, Luda Apinys and Ken Doyle, sought an injunction to have the film withdrawn on the grounds that it was a pornographic film and they had only agreed to make an educational one. Their attempt was unsuccessful.

The movie was rated "R". According to Trenchard-Smith the film "did okay... getting its money back and making a small profit."
