= Alice Through the Multiverse =

2016 novel by Brian Trenchard-Smith

Alice Through the Multiverse (The Headsman's Daughter)
- First edition
- Author: Brian Trenchard-Smith
- Cover artist: Elizabeth Bisegna; Kevin G. Summers (second edition)
- Language: English
- Genre: Science fiction, Political thriller
- Published: June 16, 2016; January 29, 2018 (second edition)
- Publisher: Self-published via CreateSpace
- Publication place: United States
- Media type: Print (paperback), e-book
- Pages: 246; 298 (second edition)
- ISBN: 978-1983540868
- OCLC: 967283259

Alice Through the Multiverse (titled The Headsman's Daughter in its first edition) is a 2016 science fiction political thriller novel by the filmmaker Brian Trenchard-Smith. It is his first work as a novelist. Described by the author as "a sardonic take on agitprop fiction exploring themes of political corruption, justice, destiny and timeless love, with a bit of metaphysics thrown in for good measure", it is based on The Executioner's Daughter, an unproduced screenplay that Trenchard-Smith began developing in 2003.

== Plot ==
Alice awakens in a psychiatric hospital believing she is the daughter of a 16th century executioner. Is she insane? Or has a portal in the multiverse opened to a past life, where Alice and her outlaw lover are hunted by a corrupt noble and his henchmen, who have their counterparts in her frightening new life? What is the agenda of the handsome young doctor who kidnaps her? Why will Security Agents kill to possess her? Are cosmic forces in play to change both past and future? Get ready for a ripping yarn; a time paradox roller coaster ride, blending thriller genres in a sardonic take on history, destiny, and timeless love. Join Alice as she is catapulted back and forth between deadly conspiracies beyond her understanding. But Alice is resourceful and brave...

— Author's summary

== Development and publication ==
=== Development ===
In 2003, while staying on campus at UCLA - where his wife Margaret was completing a doctorate in Byzantine history - Trenchard-Smith devised the premise of Alice Through the Multiverse on the basis of a dream he experienced, in which a medieval young woman fleeing from an execution found herself in a 21st-century psychiatric hospital. He continued to develop the story and characters between his daily swimming sessions at a campus pool, "scribbl[ing] bullet points on [his] hand as soon as [he] reached the locker room". After initially polishing these ideas through two novel chapters, he rewrote the project as a screenplay, titled The Executioner's Daughter.

The Executioner's Daughter was optioned twice for "good money", but could not enter production because Trenchard-Smith and the financiers were unable to find an established actress who could play the leading role of Alice and her 21st century counterpart, Jane, and thus gain the financial backing of a major studio. Reportedly, Scarlett Johansson and Keira Knightley were among those considered and contacted via their agents, but Trenchard-Smith believes that neither actress read the script, noting "To be fair, it may have seemed too wacky a premise for a new young star". To attract further attention to the project, as Trenchard-Smith's reputation had not yet been bolstered by the documentary Not Quite Hollywood: The Wild, Untold Story of Ozploitation! (2008), Christian Alvart signed on as director, and a further eleven drafts of the script were written to please a variety of distributors, but eventually the option expired, and the rights to the work reverted to the author by 2008.

Trenchard-Smith decided to rewrite The Executioner's Daughter as a novel, and sent drafts to various publishers, none of whom expressed interest. In 2015, he decided to self-publish the novel, and rewrote it again to build on the characterization and the story's political themes. To avoid confusion with a novel of the same name by Jane Hardstaff, he changed the book's title to The Headsman's Daughter. Despite attracting positive reviews from readers, the author felt that the book's cover art and title did not garner the attention of the young adult audience he was hoping to attract the story with, and that the ending was not satisfactory. Deciding to republish the story under the title Alice Through the Multiverse, he added an additional three chapters to the book, including a new ending which he devised with Margaret's help.

Acknowledging that Alice Through the Multiverse does not fit into a singular genre, Trenchard-Smith has said of the project's development:

I have called it a genre mash-up/movie homage in novel form, as if Game of Thrones met The Bourne Identity on Freaky Friday. I realize fiction in today's market is very niche-reader specific, particularly in self-publishing, and I am swimming against the tide by combining genres. But I could not keep Alice locked up in my head. She had to come out, so I hope people love her as I do. I would love to see it become a movie or TV franchise. Alice has more adventures in her.

=== Publication ===
The first edition of Alice Through the Multiverse, as The Headsman's Daughter, was published on June 16, 2016. To accompany its release, a trailer was created by BFX Imageworks, which had provided visual effects on four of Trenchard-Smith's previous films, featuring music by Penka Kouneva. The second edition was published on January 29, 2018.

== Reception ==
Writer Richard Christian Matheson, with whom Trenchard-Smith had worked with on the television series Chemistry, expressed his view that Alice Through the Multiverse "cliff-hangs madly with wild twists, wicked wit and red-blooded passion. The action is knock-out filmic and Trenchard-Smith has dazzling talent to burn".
