= Rosalind Speirs =

Australian actress

- Born: 1951 (age 74–75); Sydney, Australia
- Other name: Ros Speirs
- Occupations: Film and television actress
- Years active: 1974–1981
- Awards: Logie Award for Most Popular Australian Lead Actress; 1977 Power Without Glory

Rosalind Speirs (born 1951) is an Australian former film and television actress. She starred on several television series during the 1970s, including Silent Number, Heidi and the television miniseries Power Without Glory. It was her role as Nellie Moran, wife of the main character John West (Martin Vaughan), that earned her a Logie Award for "Most Popular Australian Lead Actress" in 1977. Speirs was also a guest star in a storyline of Prisoner in 1980.

== Career ==
Rosalind Speirs made her acting debut in the 1974 film Stone where she had a minor role as a prostitute. In her next film, The Man from Hong Kong (1975), she had a more substantial role playing the lead female Caroline Thorne. That same year, Speirs appeared in the exploitation documentary film The Love Epidemic (1975). She also began a successful career in television appearing on Silent Number and Power Without Glory. At the 1977 Logie Awards, she won a Logie Award for "Most Popular Australian Lead Actress" for her portrayal of Nellie Moran in Power Without Glory.

She also appeared on The Restless Years and Heidi, playing a recurring character Aunt Dete in the latter series. In 1980, Speirs was cast as Caroline Simpson in the series Prisoner. She portrayed a young woman who, with her mother Vivienne Williams (Bernadette Gibson), were charged with the murder of her alcoholic and abusive father. Although she appeared in the series for a brief time, her character was involved in a number of significant storylines. These included their initial introduction at the original halfway house and becoming romantically involved with prison officer Deputy Governor Jim Fletcher (Gerard Maguire). She eventually left the series to become an agent appearing in her final role in the horror film Alison's Birthday (1981).

== Filmography ==
=== Film ===
Year	Title	Role	Type
1974	Stone	Whore	Feature film
1975	The Love Epidemic	Various Characters	Feature film documentary
1975	The Man from Hong Kong	Caroline Thorne	Feature film
1979	Alison's Birthday	Maggie Carlyle	Feature film (released 1981)

=== Television ===
Year	Title	Role	Type
1974	This Love Affair	Guest role	TV series, 1 episode
1974-1975	Silent Number	Regular lead role: Pat Casey / Janet	TV series, 34 episodes
1976	Power Without Glory	Lead role: Nellie Moran / Nellie West	TV miniseries, 25 episodes
1977	19th Annual TV Week Logie Awards	Herself	TV special
1977	End of Summer	Lead role	ABC Teleplay
1977-1978	The Restless Years	Recurring role: Gillian Vaughan	TV series, 9 episodes
1978	Heidi	Recurring role: Aunt Dete	TV series (Switzerland / West Germany / Australia), 4 episodes
1980	Blankety Blanks	Herself & Martin Vaughan	TV series, 2 episodes
1980	Prisoner	Recurring role: Caroline Simpson	TV series, 26 episodes
1980	Cop Shop	Guest role: Jocelyn Knowles	TV series, 2 episodes
2004	The Man From Hong Kong: Jimmy Wang Yu In Australia	Caroline Thorne in The Man From Hong Kong	Video

== Theatre ==
Year	Title	Role	Type
1971	Murder in the Cathedral		NIDA Theatre, Sydney
1978	Spokesong	Daisy Bell	Ensemble Theatre, Sydney
1979	The Chairman	Veronica	Marian Street Theatre, Sydney
1979	Errol Flynn's Great Big Adventure Book For Boys	Lois	Stables Theatre, Sydney
