= Brent Jasmer =

American film, stage and television actor

- Education: American Academy of Dramatic Arts
- Occupation: Actor
- Spouse: Adrianne Richter
- Children: 2

Brent Jasmer is an American actor. He is best known for playing Sly Donovan in the American soap opera television series The Bold and the Beautiful.

== Life and career ==
Jasmer is adopted. He attended and graduated from the American Academy of Dramatic Arts. After graduating, he appeared in such stage plays as West Side Story, My Fair Lady and A Chorus Line. He began his screen career in 1989, appearing in the television film Protect and Surf. In the same year, he appeared in the film Hot Times at Montclair High.

Later in his career, from 1992 to 1996, Jasmer played Sly Donovan in the CBS soap opera television series The Bold and the Beautiful. He guest-starred in television programs including Caroline in the City, High Tide, Teen Angel and Team Knight Rider. He also appeared in films such as Leprechaun 4: In Space and An American Vampire Story.

Jasmer retired from acting in 1998, last appearing in the ABC sitcom television series The Drew Carey Show. Aside from acting, he performed as a vocalist.

== Personal life ==
In the 1990s, Jasmer married Adrianne Richter. They had two children.
