= Day of the Panther and Strike of the Panther =

Day of the Panther
- VHS cover
- Directed by: Brian Trenchard-Smith
- Screenplay by: Peter West
- Story by: Peter West; David Groom
- Additional dialogue by: Brian Trenchard-Smith
- Produced by: Damien Parer
- Starring: Edward John Stazak; John Stanton; Jim Richards; Michael Carman; Zale Daniel; Matthew Quartermaine
- Cinematography: Simon Akkerman
- Edited by: David Jaegar; Kerry Regan
- Music by: Gary Hardman; Brian Beamish
- Production companies: Virgo Productions; TVM Studios; The Mandemar Group; Danetan
- Distributed by: CIC-Taft Home Video
- Release date: 1988
- Running time: 84 minutes
- Country: Australia
- Language: English
- Budget: A$500,000

Strike of the Panther
- Directed by: Brian Trenchard-Smith
- Screenplay by: Peter West
- Additional dialogue by: Ranald Allan; Brian Trenchard-Smith
- Produced by: Damien Parer
- Starring: Edward John Stazak; John Stanton; Rowena Wallace; Jim Richards; Paris Jefferson; Zale Daniel; Matthew Quartermaine
- Cinematography: Simon Akkerman
- Edited by: Kerry Regan; David Jaegar
- Music by: Garry Hardman; Brian Beamish
- Production companies: Virgo Productions; TVM Studios; The Mandemar Group; Danetan
- Distributed by: CIC-Taft Home Video
- Release date: 1988
- Running time: 83 minutes
- Country: Australia
- Language: English
- Budget: A$500,000

Day of the Panther and Strike of the Panther are two 1988 Australian direct-to-video martial arts films directed by Brian Trenchard-Smith, starring Edward John Stazak as Jason Blade. The films were shot simultaneously and released consecutively.

The director described them as a "martial arts adolescent macho adventure, with as much credibly linked non-stop action as possible" starring a lead who is "attractive, has cat-like grace, and, as tends to happen a lot in my movies, gets his shirt off a lot, and has a good set of pectorals."

== Plot ==
=== Day of the Panther ===
Jason Blade and Linda Anderson uncover a Triad drug ring involving Jim Baxter. Linda is killed and Jason must infiltrate the drug ring to get revenge.

=== Strike of the Panther ===
Jason Blade rescues Julia, the daughter of prominent businessman David Summers, from a brothel in Dalkeith. Blade then forms the Crime Task Force to assist in the capture of Jim Baxter. Baxter kidnaps Gemma Anderson, Blade's girlfriend and wounds her father, William Anderson. Baxter seeks refuge in a deserted power station, wiring it with enough explosives to destroy half of Perth.

== Production ==
The films were created for the international video market and were intended to make a star of Australian martial artist Ed Staszak. They were made entirely with private finance. Production started in March 1987 in Perth and Fremantle, West Australia, under the direction of stunt co-ordinator Peter West. Four days into filming it was felt that a more experienced director was needed, so Brian Trenchard-Smith was brought in at two days' notice.

"It was the toughest rescue job I've ever done," said Trenchard Smith at the time. "The whole shoot was turned upside down."

Trenchard-Smith went straight into shooting a major fight sequence on his first day and made script changes as he went along, including putting in a new pre-credit sequence to establish the relationship between the characters. He also recast several actors, adding John Stanton to the cast. Trenchard Smith:

If you have to spend extra money replacing a director, then you should look at other elements that ought to be changed, otherwise you're just pouring good money after bad... To a certain extent directing the film was a little like directorial theatresports. I would get to a location to work with supporting actors I hadn't yet met to do a scene that had certain problems. I had to do a great deal of thinking on my feet and thinking fast, and still get four minutes of screen time in a day. I was shooting two pictures at once.

There were eight fight scenes in the first film and nine in the second. "While I've made it tough, I haven't made it unpleasant," said the director. "There's no dwelling on gore. People do bleed occasionally but they bleed politely."

Trenchard-Smith said that the film was aimed at the 13- to 20-year-old market:

The dedicated martial arts people are basically the adolescents who want to watch an invincible superhero who's incredibly fast with feet and hands. The audience is primarily male but there is a significant number of females. If the hero is attractive they won't mind watching him either, provided that the violent action is not too brutal.

The film was shot on 16mm and blown up to 35 mm for possible theatrical release before being released on video.

== Reception ==
Trenchard-Smith later claimed that the films sold around the world:

Because there is an audience in every country that will settle for a vaguely coherent story, cliched situations, but regular albeit low budget punch ups. The Panthers were not movies I would have developed this way even on such a low budget, but they were movies I was prepared to rescue to a basic level, so the investors could get their money back. Inevitably I was criticized for decisions I inherited rather than created. And time tends not to be kind to your efforts on fundamentally flawed material anyway. But if you also work as a film doctor between your own productions, that goes with the territory. The main thing is: from an economic standpoint – THE PATIENT LIVED!

A third film in the series, Escape of the Panther was planned but was not made.

Edward Stazak later starred in another Australian action film, Black Neon.
