= Wuthering Heights (1959 film) =

1959 film by Alan Burke

- Genre: romantic drama
- Based on: Wuthering Heights by Emily Brontë
- Screenplay by: Nigel Kneale
- Directed by: Alan Burke
- Starring: Lew Luton; Delia Williams
- Country of origin: Australia
- Original language: English

Production
- Running time: 100 mins
- Production company: ABC

Original release
- Network: ABV-2 (Melbourne)
- Release: 28 October 1959 (live, Sydney)
- Release: 9 December 1959 (taped, Melbourne)

Wuthering Heights is a 1959 Australian television play adapted from Emily Brontë's 1847 novel Wuthering Heights. It was directed by Alan Burke and based on a script by Nigel Kneale which had been adapted by the BBC in 1953 as a TV play starring Richard Todd. It was made at a time when Australian drama production was rare.

== Premise ==
Heathcliff, a gypsy orphan, is adopted by the Earnshaw family at Wuthering Heights on the Yorkshire Moors. He loves Cathy Earnshaw and is hated by her brother Hindley. Cathy rejects Heathcliff, so he leaves, and she marries Edgar Linton. Heathcliff returns years later, a wealthy man, and takes up residence as master of Wuthering Heights. He marries Edgar's sister Isabella in order to make Cathy jealous.

== Cast ==
- Lew Luton as Heathcliffe
- Delia Williams as Cathy Earnshaw
- Annette Andre as Isabella
- David Bluford
- Richard Davies as Hindley Earnshaw
- Geoffrey King
- Hugh Stewart
- Nancye Stewart as Ellen Dean
- Lou Vernon

== Production ==
The novel was a study text for many Australian high schools. The production was mostly broadcast live, but some segments were pre-filmed around Sydney. Lew Luton was a DJ and presenter of teen shows at the time. Luton said he used Method acting for his performance.

Brunette Annette Andre, who played Isabella, dyed her hair blonde so as to contrast with dark-haired Delia Williams, who played Cathy. "We worked very hard on it," recalled Andre.

== Reception ==
Wuthering Heights was one of three plays that Alan Burke directed that year, along with The Skin of Our Teeth and Misery Me. He said they all received "tiny ratings" and that Wuthering Heights "was too large for our television conditions, and things went wrong."

=== Critical ===
The TV critic for The Sydney Morning Herald thought the play was "straightforward enough in its story-telling and sufficiently wide-ranging in its techniques" but "hardly ever caught the necessary brooding Gothic spirit of the time, the place and the situation." He criticized Lew Luton as being too often "merely surly, when he should have been daemonic, and in general failed to reconcile his desire to work like a twentieth century actor." Other actors were praised, and Alan Burke's direction was called "carefully smooth; but there were moments when the spirit of the production was closer to Stella Gibbons than to Emily Brontë."

The reviewer for the Sydney The Sun-Herald thought it was "good TV in every respect... cast, acting, camera work and the smooth interpolation of film clips with the actual studio telecast" adding Delia Williams "played the part of the wayward, tempestuous Cathy to perfection" and said Luton was "excellent... although his make up and hairdo was rather unfortunately reminiscent of Marlon Brando's leather-jacketed cyclist in The Wild One." She also thought Richard Davies gave "one of the year's best TV acting jobs."

The reviewer for The Age said the play was disappointing and that "the atmosphere of bleakness and howling winds was not created with realism. Noises off were much too prevalent. The casting was not up to standard. . . . Luton showed a lack of understanding on the part of both actor and producer."

Neil Hutchison, head of drama at the ABC, called it “a rather uneven production… there were some good things about it, but Heathcliffe as played by Lew Luton was a very pale reflection of what Miss Brontë intended.”

== See also ==
- List of live television plays broadcast on Australian Broadcasting Corporation (1950s)
