= Leprechaun 3 =

- Promotional poster
- Directed by: Brian Trenchard-Smith
- Written by: David DuBos
- Based on: Characters by Mark Jones
- Produced by: Jeff Geoffray; Walter Josten; Henry Seggerman
- Starring: Warwick Davis; John Gatins; Lee Armstrong; Caroline Williams; John DeMita; Michael Callan
- Cinematography: David Lewis
- Edited by: Daniel Duncan
- Music by: Dennis Michael Tenney
- Production companies: Trimark Pictures; Blue Rider Productions
- Distributed by: Vidmark Entertainment
- Release date: June 27, 1995
- Running time: 90 minutes
- Country: United States
- Language: English
- Budget: $1.2 million

Leprechaun 3 (also known as Leprechaun 3: In Vegas) is a 1995 American horror comedy film written by David BuBos and directed by Brian Trenchard-Smith. It is the third in the Leprechaun film series. The film follows the leprechaun who begins a killing spree in Las Vegas. The film received negative reviews from critics.

The film was followed by Leprechaun 4: In Space (1997).

== Plot ==
At Las Vegas, a customer with missing body parts sells the leprechaun statue to pawn shop owner Gupta. The statue has a medallion around its neck, which Gupta removes, despite being warned against doing so. As Gupta examines a pot of gold coins found with the statue, the leprechaun, Lubdan, comes to life and attacks him. Seeing the medallion, Lubdan flees into the back of the shop with his pot of gold, dropping 1 of all coins in the process. Gupta sees a computer program on Irish folklore that says a leprechaun's coin will grant the holder one wish (for anything) and that its power resides in the gold. After realizing he missed 1 coin, Lubdan tricks Gupta into getting rid of the medallion, then beats him to death.

Meanwhile, Scott McCoy, a college student passing through Vegas, helps stranded motorist Tammy reach her job at the Lucky Shamrock Casino (following her vehicle's death on her). Scott convinces Tammy to sneak him into the casino, where he gambles away all his tuition money. On the advice of casino employee Loretta, Scott goes to the pawn shop to sell his watch and finds Gupta's corpse and the coin. Seeing the computer program and not realizing that the coin's nearby, Scott makes a nonchalant wish to be back at the casino on a winning streak; he is then teleported back to the casino, unknowingly escaping an attack by Lubdan, who knows that Scott has the coin.

At the casino, Scott finds himself winning big by playing roulette. Wanting to stop financial losses, the casino owner, Mitch, closes the table and gives Scott a free room at the hotel. Scott runs into Tammy, who advises him to go to his room and hide out there before the end of her shift. Loretta and the casino's resident magician, Fazio, conspire to steal Scott's winnings, and the coin. Fazio breaks into Scott's room, only able to steal the coin before fleeing. Scott is then attacked by Lubdan and throws him out a window, but not before some of Lubdan's blood gets into a wound on his arm.

Loretta takes the coin from Fazio, which is then stolen by Mitch, who makes a sarcastic wish to have sex with Tammy. Tammy's intelligence diminishes and, under the coin's spell, she declares her love for Mitch, and they go to his suite. As Tammy does a striptease dance, Loretta steals the coin back, breaking the spell on Tammy. She rejects Mitch's advances, and he fires her in return. After Tammy leaves the suite, Lubdan appears and tricks Mitch into watching a woman undressing on the TV. The woman then crawls out of the TV and straddles Mitch in bed, pinning him down. Lubdan then transforms the woman into a robot, electrocuting Mitch to death.

Scott begins showing traits of a leprechaun, with random cravings for potatoes and speaking with an Irish accent. He later runs into a distraught Tammy. They go up to Mitch's suite and find him dead, with Lubdan nearby. Scott and Tammy escape, but Scott's condition unfortunately worsens as he begins to physically become a ( Tall) leprechaun-human hybrid. They decide to go to the pawn shop, hoping to find answers and a cure.

Meanwhile, Loretta uses the coin to wish for the body of a young, sexy woman. She then shows her new body to Fazio, who steals the coin and flees. Lubdan then makes Loretta grow exponentially, to the point of violent gory explosion, by magically inflating her breasts, lips (which Lubdan claims will "get her some tips"), and buttocks.

In the pawn shop, Scott and Tammy find Lubdan's pot of gold. Lubdan attacks, but they escape. As Scott's condition worsens further, Tammy rushes him to a hospital for care. Lubdan takes Tammy hostage in the hospital's morgue, demanding to know where the coin is. Scott, now fully transformed, tells him that Fazio has it.

Using the coin, Fazio wishes to be the world's greatest magician. During Fazio's midnight show, Lubdan traps Fazio in a box prop. Thinking that it is a part of the show, the audience watches as Lubdan uses a chainsaw to cut Fazio's box in half. The crowd goes into a panic as Lubdan reveals Fazio's violently bisected corpse.

The audience flees in terror while Scott battles Lubdan and burns the pot of gold. Lubdan spontaneously combusts as a result, burning to death, while Scott reverts to his normal form. As Scott and Tammy leave the casino, she reveals that she found the coin. Though tempted to make a wish, Tammy decides that she is happy with what she has with Scott. They discard the coin and leave the casino together.

== Cast ==
- Warwick Davis as Lubdan The Leprechaun
- John Gatins as Scott McCoy
- Lee Armstrong as Tammy Larsen
- Caroline Williams as Loretta
- John DeMita as Fazio
- Michael Callan as Mitch
- Tom Dugan as Art
- Marcelo Tubert as Gupta
- Roger Hewlett as Tony
- Heidi Staley as The Fantasy Girl
- Merle Kennedy as Melissa "Mouse" Franklin (uncredited)
- Rod McCary as Father Bob (uncredited)
- Zoe Trilling as Shirley Finnerty (uncredited)
- Terry Lee Crisp as Elvis Presley Impersonator

== Production ==
After optioning a spec script of his own to Blue Rider Productions, screenwriter David DuBos was given an opportunity to pitch for Leprechaun 3. DuBos, who hadn't seen the previous two films, was only given the guideline of "Leprechaun in Las Vegas" for his pitch. DuBos won against six other writers and had to quickly put together a script due to an impending production start. Brian Trenchard-Smith, director of Night of the Demons 2, was selected to helm the film. Trimark Pictures had considered making the film the final entry in the series. The film was shot over the course of 14 days in Los Angeles, California, with only one day taking place in Las Vegas, Nevada.

== Release ==
Leprechaun 3 was released direct-to-video on June 27, 1995 by Vidmark Entertainment, and went on to become the highest selling independent direct-to-video film of 1995. The studio would release the film on DVD on February 27, 2001. The film was released on Blu-ray for the first time by Lionsgate Home Entertainment on September 30, 2014.

== Reception ==
The film holds a 17% approval rating on the review aggregator website Rotten Tomatoes, based on 6 reviews.

Actor Warwick Davis would later claim the film as his favorite of the series: "I think it tapped into the potential of bringing a comedic element to it all. And Brian Trenchard-Smith, who directed that one, is an incredible director. He manages to get so much out of so little money, and that was what was great about working with him. He really got the humor".

== See also ==
- List of films set in Las Vegas
