= The Stuntmen =

- Written by: Brian Trenchard-Smith
- Directed by: Brian Trenchard-Smith
- Starring: Grant Page
- Country of origin: Australia
- Original language: English

Production
- Running time: 50 minutes
- Production company: Trenchard Productions
- Budget: A$16,000

Original release
- Network: Nine Network
- Release: 1973

The Stuntmen is a one-hour documentary for Australian TV written and directed by Brian Trenchard-Smith.

It won Best Documentary at the 1973 Australian Film Awards.

It was through this film that Trenchard-Smith met Grant Page, who he put under a five-year contract and featured in a number of films. The film also acted as a "calling card" which enabled the director to get finance for The Man from Hong Kong (1975).
