= Atomic Dog (film) =

- Genre: Horror; Science Fiction; Thriller
- Written by: Miguel Tejada-Flores
- Directed by: Brian Trenchard-Smith
- Starring: Daniel Hugh Kelly; Isabella Hofmann; Cindy Pickett; Micah Gardener
- Music by: Peter Bernstein
- Country of origin: United States
- Original language: English

Production
- Producers: Ted Bauman; Mark H. Ovitz
- Cinematography: David Lewis
- Editor: Stephen R. Myers
- Running time: 95 min.
- Production company: Wilshire Court Productions

Original release
- Network: USA Network
- Release: January 14, 1998

Atomic Dog is a 1998 science fiction horror film directed by Brian Trenchard-Smith and starring Daniel Hugh Kelly and Cindy Pickett. The story tells of a dog who, after being exposed to radiation, begins the search to identify himself with a pack.

== Plot ==
At an industrial plant in Devil's Canyon, a worker secretly cares for a three-month-old puppy named Cerberus. When a radiation leak occurs in the plant's second reactor, the staff are evacuated. The worker tries to retrieve Cerberus but is prevented from re-entering the contaminated area, leaving the puppy behind.

One year later, Brad and Jennifer Yates move from Los Angeles to a nearby town with their teenage son Josh, young daughter Heather, and dog Trixie. Josh struggles to adjust and befriends several local teenagers, who take him to the abandoned plant and begin shooting at animals. They encounter the now fully grown Cerberus, a large dog that has survived near the radioactive facility. Josh refuses to join their hunt and returns home with Trixie.

Soon afterward, Trixie disappears after Cerberus approaches the Yates home. She later returns with two newborn puppies, Lobo and Scamp, but dies after giving birth. The family raises the puppies; Scamp becomes gentle and closely attached to Heather, while Lobo develops an unstable temperament. After hearing Cerberus howl nearby, Lobo attacks Brad. The family leaves both dogs overnight at a veterinary clinic for testing.

Cerberus breaks into the clinic, releases Lobo, and kills the veterinarian, apparently believing that his offspring is in danger. Because Lobo escapes, the authorities initially blame him for the killing. Josh asks the family's neighbor, biologist Janice Rifkin, to investigate. Examination of the veterinarian's wounds and biological samples indicates that the attacker was an unusually powerful dog with radiation-induced cellular mutations. Janice suspects that Cerberus fathered Trixie's puppies and that Lobo and Scamp inherited different mutations from him.

After Scamp tracks Cerberus into the woods, Heather approaches the animal without fear, and he does not harm her. Janice later tries to locate and tranquilize Cerberus, accompanied by Josh, who falsely claims that his parents gave permission. Instead, they find Lobo. The dog, now violently aggressive, attacks Janice and Josh, forcing Josh to kill him. Laboratory tests subsequently show that Lobo was not the animal that killed the veterinarian.

Cerberus then enters the Yates home in another attempt to reach Scamp. Janice concludes that his attacks are driven primarily by his desire to recover and protect his offspring, and that his intelligence has also been greatly enhanced by radiation. The following morning, Cerberus traps Scamp so that he cannot interfere and persuades Heather to follow him. When the family discovers her disappearance, Janice reasons that he has taken her to the abandoned plant, the place he considers safest.

Brad, Jennifer, Josh, and Janice enter the contaminated facility with Scamp and split up to search for Heather. During the search, Brad reconciles with Josh, admitting that his attempts to control him have damaged their relationship. Deep inside the plant, Heather becomes tired and injures her head, but Cerberus continues to protect her. The family eventually locates her by following her voice through the ventilation system.

As they prepare to leave, Cerberus blocks the adults from approaching Heather. She begs them not to shoot him, but during the confrontation, metal pipes suspended above the room begin to collapse. Cerberus leaps toward Heather and shields her with his body. Heather survives, while Cerberus is mortally injured. As he dies, she comforts him and realizes that his violent behavior was largely motivated by his efforts to find and defend his offspring. Afterward, the family buries Cerberus in the backyard beside Trixie.

== Production ==
Trenchard-Smith said that he got the job directing the film because of his experience handling animals on the Tarzán TV series.
