= End of Summer (1977 film) =

End of Summer is a 1977 Australian television film directed by Oscar Whitbread and written by Cliff Green. With a story concerning rural depression and a family leaving their farm, it was adapted from Green's earlier screenplay Moving On for the Commonwealth Film Unit.

It was first broadcast as part of the ABC's Stuart Wagstaff's World Playhouse series.

End of Summer received the 1978 Sammy Award for Best TV Play.

== Cast ==
- Tony Bonner
- Rosalind Speirs
- John Nash
- Syd Conabere
- Ivor Bowyer
- Penne Hackforth-Jones
