= Deathcheaters =

Deathcheater
- Australian film poster
- Directed by: Brian Trenchard-Smith
- Screenplay by: Michael Cove
- Story by: Brian Trenchard-Smith
- Produced by: Brian Trenchard-Smith
- Starring: John Hargreaves; Grant Page; Margaret Trenchard-Smith; Noel Ferrier; Judith Woodroffe; Ralph Cotterill; Roger Ward; Chris Haywood
- Cinematography: John Seale
- Edited by: Ron Williams
- Music by: Peter Martin
- Production companies: The Australian Film Commission; National Nine Network; Roadshow Film Distributors; D.L. Taffner; Trenchard Productions
- Distributed by: Roadshow Film Distributors
- Release date: 16 December 1976
- Running time: 96 minutes
- Country: Australia
- Language: English
- Budget: A$157,000
- Box office: A$30,000 (Australia)

Deathcheaters is a 1976 Australian action adventure film directed by Brian Trenchard-Smith and starring John Hargreaves and Grant Page.

== Plot ==
Steve and Rodney are two ex-Vietnam commandos who do stunt work for television. They are hired by the government to raid the island stronghold of a Filipino racketeer and secure papers from his safe. The two men make the raid and escape using a hang-glider.

== Cast ==
- John Hargreaves as Steve Hall
- Grant Page as Rodney Cann
- Margaret Trenchard-Smith (as Margaret Gerard) as Julia Hall
- Noel Ferrier as Mr Culpepper
- Judith Woodroffe as Gloria
- Ralph Cotterill as uncivil servant
- John Krumme as Anticore director
- Drew Forsythe as battle director
- Brian Trenchard-Smith as hit and run director
- Michael Aitkens as police driver
- Roger Ward as police sergeant
- Wallas Eaton as police sergeant
- Dale Aspin as lady car driver
- Peter Collingwood as Mr Langham
- Chris Haywood as butcher
- Ann Semler as Lina
- Max Aspin as bank robber
- David Bracks as bank robber
- Reg Evans as army sergeant
- Vincent Ball as naval intelligence officer

== Production ==
The film was funded by the Australian Film Commission, Channel 9 and D.L. Taffner. It was intended to be a pilot for a TV series that could be shown theatrically in Australia and sold to television outside.

It was shot in 16mm and blown up to 35mm for theatrical release. Trenchard Smith had worked with stuntman Grant Page several times and gave him his first lead role here. He also cast his wife, Margaret Gerard, as the female lead.

Trenchard Smith says the movie went $7,000 over budget.

== Release ==
The film performed disappointingly in Australia theatrically. It had a presale to Channel Nine for $50,000, overseas sales of $40,000 and local rentals of $30,000, so made $120,000. In 1979 Trenchard-Smith was still confident the film would be profitable.

(In 1977 Antony I. Ginnane claimed the film netted $130,000 in overseas sales.)

== Reception ==
On Rotten Tomatoes, Andrew L. Urban of Urban Cinefile positively commented "nobody in their right minds would do it again, not with real actors today not even with stuntmen. Unmissable!"

=== Accolades ===
Ron Williams was nominated for Best Editing at the 1977 Australian Film Institute Awards.
