= Voyage of Terror =

- Genre: Action; Drama; Thriller
- Written by: Mel Frohman
- Directed by: Brian Trenchard-Smith
- Starring: Lindsay Wagner; Michael Ironside; Martin Sheen; Brian Dennehy
- Music by: Brahm Wenger
- Country of origin: United States
- Original language: English

Production
- Executive producers: Tony Masucci; Lance H. Robbins
- Producers: Rosanne Milliken; James Shavick
- Cinematography: Gord Verheul
- Editors: Jeremy Presner; Garry M.B. Smith
- Running time: 89 minutes
- Production company: Shavick Entertainment

Original release
- Network: The Family Channel
- Release: June 20, 1998

Voyage of Terror is a 1998 American made-for-television action-thriller drama film directed by Brian Trenchard-Smith and starring Lindsay Wagner, Michael Ironside, Martin Sheen, and Brian Dennehy. The plot concerns a virus outbreak on a ship.

== Premise ==
A disease specialist is on a cruise ship with her daughter when a virus breaks out on board. While she communicates with Washington, the Chief Engineer plans a mutiny.

== Cast ==
- Lindsay Wagner as Dr. Stephanie Tauber
- Michael Ironside as McBride
- Martin Sheen as Henry Northcutt
- Horst Buchholz as Captain
- William B. Davis as Dr. Norman Ellisy
- Katharine Isabelle as Aly Tauber
- Nathaniel DeVeaux as James Coleman
- David Lewis as Ned Simon
- Steve Bacic as Alex Reid
- Andrew Airlie as Michael
- Brian Dennehy as U.S. President
- Roger A. Cross as Robert Fernandez
- Venus Terzo as Theresa Fernandez
- Aaron Pearl as Randy Haynes
- Gabrielle Miller as Paula Simon

== Production ==
The film was shot in early 1998. Lindsay Wagner described director Brian Trenchard-Smith as "amazing. I've never seen anybody work so fast, stay so calm, keep such a good attitude. Under these conditions, the feathers usually start flying."
