= The Boldest Job in the West =

1972 film by José Antonio de la Loma

- Directed by: José Antonio de la Loma
- Written by: José Antonio de la Loma
- Produced by: José María Carcasona; Juan Cristóbal Jiménez-Quesada; Pierre Kalfon
- Starring: Mark Edwards; Carmen Sevilla; Charly Bravo
- Cinematography: Hans Burmann; Antonio Millán
- Edited by: Teresa Alcocer
- Music by: Stelvio Cipriani
- Production companies: Action Film; Les Films Number One; Promofilms
- Release date: 1972
- Running time: 93 minutes
- Countries: France; Italy; Spain
- Language: Spanish

The Boldest Job in the West (Spanish: El más fabuloso golpe del Far-West) is a 1972 western film directed by José Antonio de la Loma and starring Mark Edwards, Carmen Sevilla and Charly Bravo. The film is a Spaghetti Western, co-produced by France, Italy and Spain. A gang plans to pull off a bank robbery without shedding blood, but their attempt quickly descends into a massacre.

== Cast ==
- Mark Edwards as Michigan
- Carmen Sevilla as Marion
- Charly Bravo as Poldo
- Patty Shepard as Lupe
- Piero Lulli as Jeremias
- Barbara Carroll as Sophia
- Frank Braña as Jess Calloway
- Yvan Verella as Budd
- Jaume Picas
- Poldo Bendandi
- Osvaldo Genazzani
- Mercedes Linter
- Fernando Bilbao
- J. Lintermans
- Juanito Santiago
- Fernando Sancho as Reyes
- Miquel Bordoy

== Bibliography ==
- Thomas Weisser. Spaghetti Westerns--the Good, the Bad and the Violent: A Comprehensive, Illustrated Filmography of 558 Eurowesterns and Their Personnel, 1961-1977. McFarland, 2005.
