= Absolute Deception =

- Film poster
- Directed by: Brian Trenchard-Smith
- Screenplay by: Peter Sullivan
- Story by: Jeffrey Schenck; Peter Sullivan
- Produced by: Dale Bradley; Kirk Shaw; Grant Bradley; Brian Trenchard-Smith
- Starring: Cuba Gooding Jr. Emmanuelle Vaugier
- Cinematography: Dan Macarthur
- Edited by: Asim Nuraney
- Music by: Michael Richard Plowman
- Production companies: Odyssey Media; Voltage Pictures
- Distributed by: Sony Pictures Home Entertainment
- Release date: July 17, 2013
- Running time: 92 minutes
- Countries: Australia; Canada; United States
- Language: English
- Budget: $2 million

Absolute Deception (also known as Deception) is a 2013 Australian/Canadian international co-production action-thriller film directed by Brian Trenchard-Smith and starring Cuba Gooding Jr. and Emmanuelle Vaugier. The film was released on direct-to-DVD in the United States on June 11, 2013.

== Premise ==
When a widowed reporter is informed by an FBI agent that her deceased husband has just been murdered, the two join forces to uncover a web of deceit that is shocking and more deadly than anyone could imagine.

== Cast ==
- Cuba Gooding Jr. as John Nelson
- Emmanuelle Vaugier as Rebecca Scott
- Evert McQueen as Inspector Hendricks
- Ty Hungerford as Archer
- Jeff Gannon as D.A. Cochran
- Brad McMurray as Thug #1
- Kelly Atkinson as Brigid Archer
- Sean Edward Frazer as Police Officer #1
- Troy MacKinder as Associate
- Raymond Massey as Coroner
- Rachel Morgan-McMurray as New Yorker
- Gulliver Page as Thug #2
- Candice Storey as Constable Jill Davis
- Sam White as Police Officer #2
- Togo Singano as Kelvin
- Brian Trenchard-Smith as Police Commissioner

== Production ==
The film was shot in Gold Coast, Queensland, Australia in 15 days with actors plus two days of shooting a car chase. Brian Trenchard-Smith has a cameo in the film as a Police Commissioner.

== Home media ==
A DVD version was released in Region 1 in the United States on June 11, 2013, it was distributed by Sony Pictures Home Entertainment.
