= John Fraser (film producer) =

Australian film producer

John Dennis Fraser (19 June 1930, in Petersham, NSW – 1 September 2010) was an Australian film producer and film presenter. He co-produced The Man from Hong Kong (1975) the first Australian-Hong Kong co-production and Dangerfreaks (1989).
