= Hospitals Don't Burn Down! =

1978 Australian film by Brian Trenchard-Smith

- Directed by: Brian Trenchard-Smith
- Written by: Anne Brooksbank; Chris McGill
- Produced by: Peter Johnson
- Starring: Jeanie Drynan; Mark Edwards; Ray Marshall; Ralph Cotterill; Ken Goodlet
- Cinematography: Ross Nichols
- Edited by: Bill Stacey
- Production companies: Film Australia; Department of Veterans' Affairs; Kingcroft Productions
- Distributed by: Film Australia
- Release date: 1978
- Running time: 24 minutes
- Country: Australia
- Language: English
- Budget: $90,000

Hospitals Don't Burn Down! is a 1978 pseudo-documentary short film directed by Brian Trenchard-Smith about a fire at a hospital.

== Cast ==
- Jeanie Drynan as Sister
- Mark Edwards
- Ray Marshall
- Ralph Cotterill
- Ken Goodlet

== Plot ==
A tossed cigarette from a patient causes fire to break out after midnight in a multi-storey hospital, cutting the top floors off from escape. It spreads quickly and despite the prompt action of the fire department, lack of fire safety training results in several fatalities.

== Production ==
The movie was widely screened around the world and won a number of prizes. Trenchard-Smith says it is one of the movies of which he is most proud:

[It] won all sorts of industrial safety awards all over the world, and was Australia's highest-selling industrial film for 25 years, used all over the world. We staged a fire, cutting a multi-story hospital in half, bursting from the laundry chute out onto one floor. And the film was designed to have a whole series of lessons to be learned in a lecture afterwards. There were alarming incidents of smoking-related fires in their hospitals. It actually became a fire-safety film worldwide. It's actually a film I’m proud to have made, and I made it for very little money, but I’m very pleased that I spent the four months that I did making that. I was told that one hospital changed their arrangements after seeing the film, and moved the non-ambulatory patients from the fourth floor to the ground floor, and several months later, the fourth floor caught fire.

6 months of research preceded the filming. 77 actors were used alongside real fire brigades and ambulances. The production (nicknamed The Towering Infirmary by the crew) was filmed at Concord Repatriation Hospital, Bethesda House, Marrickville and Royal Newcastle Hospital.
