= Leprechaun 4: In Space =

- VHS cover
- Directed by: Brian Trenchard-Smith
- Written by: Dennis Pratt
- Based on: Characters by Mark Jones
- Produced by: Jeff Geoffray; Walter Josten
- Starring: Warwick Davis; Rebekah Carlton; Brent Jasmer; Jessica Collins; Guy Siner
- Cinematography: David Lewis
- Edited by: Daniel Duncan
- Music by: Dennis Michael Tenney
- Production companies: Trimark Pictures; Blue Rider Productions
- Distributed by: Vidmark Entertainment
- Release dates: October 31, 1996 (Russia); February 25, 1997 (United States)
- Running time: 95 minutes
- Country: United States
- Language: English
- Budget: $1.6 million

Leprechaun 4: In Space is a 1996 American science fiction comedy horror film directed by Brian Trenchard-Smith and written by Dennis Pratt. Warwick Davis stars as the titular leprechaun, who terrorizes a Marine crew aboard a spaceship in order to retrieve a princess he intends to wed.

The film is the fourth installment in the Leprechaun series, preceded by Leprechaun 3 (1995) and followed by Leprechaun in the Hood (2000).

== Plot ==
In 2096, on a remote planet, the Leprechaun courts an alien princess named Zarina in a nefarious plot to become king of her home planet. The two agree to marry, with each partner secretly planning to kill the other after the wedding night in order to enjoy the marriage benefits (a peerage for the Leprechaun, the Leprechaun's gold and jewels for the princess) undisturbed.

A platoon of space marines arrive on the planet and kill the Leprechaun for interfering with mining operations. Lucky tries to steal gold but gets killed by the leprechaun's lightsaber. A grenade explodes, killing the leprechaun. Gloating over the victory, one of the marines, Kowalski, urinates on the Leprechaun's body. Unbeknownst to Kowalski, the Leprechaun's spirit travels up his urine stream and into his penis, where his presence manifests. The marines return to their ship with the injured Zarina, whom they plan to take back to her home world to establish positive diplomatic relations. The ship's commander, the cyborg Dr. Mittenhand, explains his plans to use Zarina's regenerative DNA to recreate his own body, which was mutilated in a failed experiment. Elsewhere on the ship, the Leprechaun violently emerges from Kowalski's penis after he is aroused during a sexual act. The marines hunt the Leprechaun, who outsmarts them and kills most of the crew in gruesome and absurd ways.

While pursuing Zarina, the Leprechaun injects Mittenhand with a mixture of Zarina's DNA and the remains of a blended scorpion and tarantula, before initiating the ship's self-destruct mechanism. A surviving marine, Sticks, rushes to the bridge to defuse the self-destruct, but is stopped by a password prompt. Mittenhand—now a grotesque monster calling himself "Mittenspider"—entangles Sticks in a giant web. Meanwhile, the other survivors confront the Leprechaun in the cargo bay, where they inadvertently cause him to transform into a giant after shooting him with Dr. Mittenhand's experimental growth ray.

The ship's biological officer, Tina Reeves, escapes to the bridge and rescues Sticks by spraying Mittenhand with liquid nitrogen and shooting him. The only other surviving marine, Books, opens the airlock so the giant Leprechaun is sucked into space and explodes. Books joins the others at the helm, and they deduce that the password is "Wizard", since Dr. Mittenhand previously compared himself to the Wizard of Oz. After stopping the self-destruct sequence, Books and Reeves kiss, while Sticks looks out the window to see the Leprechaun's giant hand giving him the finger.

== Cast ==
- Warwick Davis as Lubdan the Leprechaun
- Rebekah Carlton as Princess Zarina
- Brent Jasmer as Staff Sergeant "Books" Malloy
- Jessica Collins as Dr. Tina Reeves
- Guy Siner as Dr. Mittenhand / The Mittenspider
- Gary Grossman as Harold
- Joseph Slaven as Captain “Snake” Marcus
- Tim Colceri as Master Sergeant "Metal Head" Hooker
- Miguel A. Nunez Jr. as Private "Sticks"
- Debbe Dunning as Private Delores Costello
- Mike Cannizzo as Private Danny O'Grady
- Rick Peters as Private "Mooch"
- Geoff Meed as Private Kowalski
- Ladd York as Private "Lucky"

== Critical reception ==
This film holds a 44% approval rating on review aggregator website Rotten Tomatoes, based on 9 reviews, with an average rating of 4.6/10. The A.V. Club wrote that "the outer-space setting comes off as a desperate ploy to continue a horror series without having to pay any attention to continuity or the laws of reality". DVD Talk rated the film as 3 stars of 5 stars as "Recommended".
