= Happy Face Murders =

- Promotional poster
- Written by: John Pielmeier
- Directed by: Brian Trenchard-Smith
- Starring: Ann-Margret; Marg Helgenberger; Henry Thomas
- Music by: Peter Bernstein
- Country of origin: United States
- Original language: English

Production
- Executive producers: John Cosgrove; Terry Dunn Meurer
- Producers: Diane Jeanne; Ned Welsh
- Cinematography: Albert J. Dunk
- Editor: Bill Goddard
- Running time: 100 minutes
- Production company: Paramount Pictures

Original release
- Network: Showtime
- Release: September 5, 1999

Happy Face Murders is a 1999 American made-for-television crime drama film directed by Brian Trenchard-Smith. It is based on a real story.

It was shot in 21 days and is one of director Brian Trenchard-Smith's favourite films.

== Plot synopsis ==
Lorraine Petrovich frames her abusive lover killing a young intellectually disabled girl by creating details of the murder from clues she picks up from Detective Jennifer Powell. Powell works the case with law doctoral student Dylan McCarthy, whom she repeatedly calls "Doc", despite McCarthy not actually being a doctor yet. Lorraine implicates herself, resulting in her jail sentence, and then recants her testimony. No one believes her, until clues surface from the real killer, who leaves messages that he is still out there, has killed before, and will kill again, signing his victims with Happy Faces.

== Cast ==
- Ann-Margret as Lorraine Petrovich
- Marg Helgenberger as Jennifer Powell
- Henry Thomas as Dylan McCarthy
- Nicholas Campbell as Rusty Zuvic
- Rick Peters as Billy Lee Peterson
- David McIlwraith as Alan Sanford
- Bruce Gray as Ephraim Quince
- J. C. Mackenzie as Ed Baker
- Emily Hampshire as Tracy Billings
- Christina Collins as Nancy Severn
- Sean Dick as Charlie Severn
- Lynne Deragon as Virginia Billings
- Anthony J. Mifsud as Gary Martin (uncredited)

== Reception ==
David Nusair of Reel Film Reviews gave a positive review on Marg Helgenberger's performance, writing she "provides enough charm to make it worth a look."
