= Escape Clause (film) =

- Genre: Drama; Mystery; Thriller
- Written by: Danilo Bach
- Directed by: Brian Trenchard-Smith
- Starring: Andrew McCarthy; Paul Sorvino; Connie Britton; Kate McNeil
- Music by: Richard Marvin; Ken Thorne
- Country of origin: United States
- Original language: English

Production
- Producer: Danilo Bach
- Production location: Toronto
- Cinematography: Bert Tougas
- Editor: Bill Goddard
- Running time: 103 mins
- Production companies: MGM Television; Showtime Networks

Original release
- Network: Showtime
- Release: July 14, 1996

Escape Clause is a 1996 made-for-TV film directed by Brian Trenchard-Smith.

== Premise ==
The film is a murder mystery about an insurance agent/advertising executive (Andrew McCarthy) accused of his wife's murder. He claims that his wife had paid a hit-man/contract killer/assassin to eliminate him - but she is killed before he can discover the truth about the allegation.
