= Brian Trenchard-Smith =

English and Australian film director (born 1946)

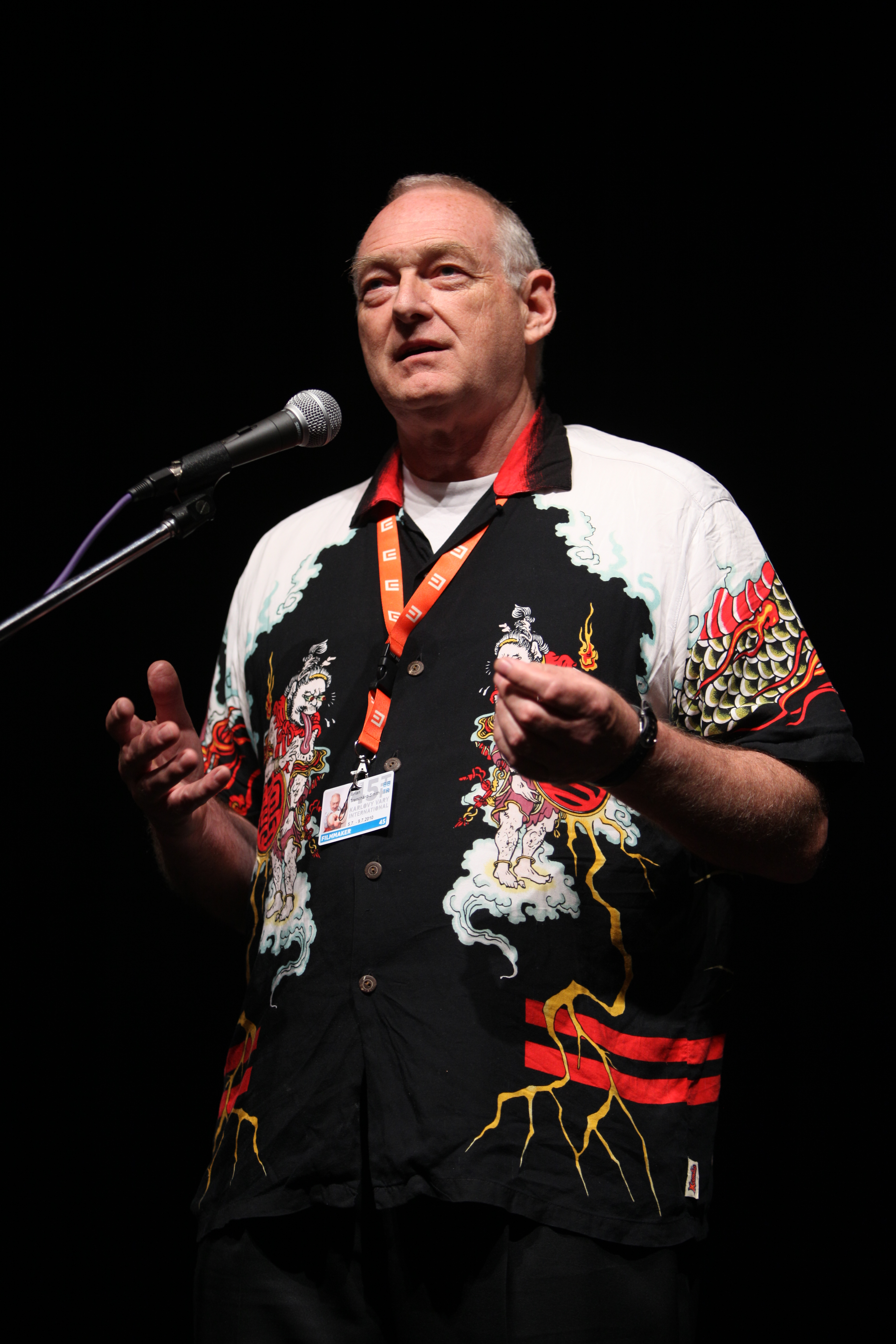
- Trenchard-Smith in 2010
- Born: Brian Medwin Trenchard-Smith; 1946 (age 79–80); England, United Kingdom
- Education: Wellington College
- Occupations: Film director, film producer, screenwriter, actor, author
- Years active: 1965—present
- Spouse: Margaret Enger (m. 1975)
- Children: 2

Brian Medwin Trenchard-Smith (born 1946) is an English and Australian filmmaker and author, known for his idiosyncratic and satirical low-budget genre films. His filmography covers action, science fiction, martial arts, dystopian fiction, comedy, war, family, thriller, romance and erotica, and his works tend to be cross-genre pieces.

After gaining experience as a writer and editor of film trailers, Trenchard-Smith made documentary films for Australian television, many of which focused on stunt performers and martial artists, including his frequent collaborator Grant Page. He made his directorial debut with The Man from Hong Kong (1975), the first film to be produced as an international co-production between Australia and Hong Kong. Many of Trenchard-Smith's films over the next decade became notable examples of the Ozploitation cycle, including Deathcheaters (1976), Stunt Rock (1978), Turkey Shoot (1982), BMX Bandits (1983), Frog Dreaming (1986) and Dead End Drive-In (1986).

Trenchard-Smith moved to Hollywood in 1990, and has since primarily directed made-for-television and direct-to-video films. His other notable works include The Siege of Firebase Gloria (1989), Night of the Demons 2 (1994), Leprechaun 3 (1995), Leprechaun 4: In Space (1996), Happy Face Murders (1999), Britannic (2000), Megiddo: The Omega Code 2 (2001), DC 9/11: Time of Crisis (2003), Aztec Rex (2007), Chemistry (2011), Absolute Deception (2013) and Drive Hard (2014). His debut novel, The Headsman's Daughter (later retitled Alice Through the Multiverse), was self-published in 2016. Several of Trenchard-Smith's films have garnered cult followings and have been subject to critical re-evaluation, and he has also been cited as one of Quentin Tarantino's favourite directors.

== Biography ==
=== Early life ===
Trenchard-Smith was born in England, the son of a senior officer of the Royal Air Force (RAF), and lived for a time in Libya, where his father was stationed. His family moved to RAF Odiham, Hampshire and he made his first film at the age of 15 on 8mm, a 2-minute short called The Duel. The following year he made the ten-minute The Chase about a lunatic who escapes from an asylum and chases a boy around the countryside with a bayonet.

He was commissioned to make a film about his school, Wellington College, for prospective parents. He showed this around once he left school, and it helped him get work as an editor's assistant and camera assistant with a French news company in London. However he was unable to get into the union so he moved to Australia in 1965 (his father was Australian).

=== Australian television and trailers ===
Trenchard-Smith worked at Channel Ten as an editor, doing news, documentaries and station promos. He moved over to Channel 9 to work as promotions director, then in 1968 he returned to England and went to work in London as a junior writer/producer of feature film trailers at the National Screen Service.

In 1970 he returned to Channel 9 as network promotions director, and made his directorial debut with a French TV special Christmas in Australia. He followed it with a series of other specials: Marty Feldman in Australia (1972), The Big Screen Scene (1972), For Valor (1972), Inside Alvin Purple (1972).

=== Documentary filmmaker ===
After two years at Channel 9 Trenchard Smith formed his own production company, Trenchard Productions, borrowed $16,000 and made a one-hour television special about stuntmen called The Stuntmen featuring Grant Page. This was a success.

Trenchard-Smith was going to Hong Kong to make an $8,000 documentary on Bruce Lee called The World of Kung Fu but arrived on the day Lee died. He turned the documentary into a tribute on Lee, and in the course of making it met Raymond Chow. Trenchard-Smith made another TV special, Kung Fu Killers (1974), featuring Page and George Lazenby. Throughout this decade Trenchard-Smith also worked cutting trailers.

Trenchard-Smith made the sex-orientated semi-documentary The Love Epidemic (1975) which was made for $33,000. It was theatrically released and made a small profit.

=== The Man from Hong Kong ===
Trenchard-Smith's Hong Kong connections enabled him to make his dramatic feature film debut with the action movie The Man from Hong Kong (1975), the first Australian-Hong Kong co production. Starring Jimmy Wang Yu, George Lazenby and Grant Page, the film was made for The Movie Company, a production company half owned by Trenchard-Smith and Greater Union, and Golden Harvest. The film sold well around the world and established Trenchard-Smith as an action director.

Trenchard Smith then made the TV documentary Danger Freaks for the Movie Company before Greater Union pulled out of the organisation and it was wound up.

Trenchard Smith then made another action feature film, Deathcheaters (1976), starring Grant Page, which performed disappointingly at the box office. He spent nine months on a proposed film that never got up, The Siege of Sydney (aka Pillage Squad).

However he then made a dramatised short, Hospitals Don't Burn Down!, which won a number of awards and was highly successful.

=== First American films ===
Trenchard-Smith then made a film in the US called Stunt Rock (1978) which he once called "probably the worst film I have made" although it has become a cult classic. It starred Grant Page and the US band Sorcery.

He followed this with Day of the Assassin (1979), where he replaced the original director just before filming began. He later said making the movie was one of his craziest directing experiences:

All directors, at some point in their career trajectory, find themselves hanging on to a runaway train; despite best efforts, things turn to custard on a daily basis. More often than not, The Movie from Hell is a co-production. Foreign locale, fast money, giant egos, high pressure schedule – all make a volatile witches’ brew, even before you factor in deep rooted national resentments.

=== 10BA era ===
Trenchard-Smith returned to cutting trailers for various Australian films. Producer Antony I. Ginnane hired him to cut together footage of films during production to raise additional finance. These included Harlequin and The Survivor. Ginnane then hired Trenchard-Smith to direct Turkey Shoot (1982).

His work on that film got him the job of rewriting and directing the children's film, BMX Bandits (1983), which starred Nicole Kidman. He was announced as director of Blowing Hot and Cold but did not make it in the end.

Trenchard-Smith began directing episodes of Australian TV shows such as Five Mile Creek. He was hired by the producers of Frog Dreaming (1985) to replace the original director during the shoot.

He followed it with a melodrama which he co-wrote, Jenny Kissed Me (1985), then another action film, Dead End Drive-In (1986). Neither was successful at the box office but the latter has developed a strong cult reputation.

Trenchard-Smith was hired for another "rescue operation" when the decision was made to sack the director of Day of the Panther (1987) during filming. This film was shot back to back with a sequel Strike of the Panther.

Trenchard-Smith did a straight-to-video thriller, Out of the Body (1988) then travelled to the Philippines to make a Vietnam War film, The Siege of Firebase Gloria (1989).

=== Move to Hollywood ===
In January 1990 Trenchard Smith moved to Hollywood. He has said that when he left Australia "I was possibly a medium-sized fish in one of cinema's smaller ponds" and when he arrived he "immediately became plankton." (In 2001 he wrote "I believe I have now evolved into a sardine. My career goal is to become a dolphin, playfully cruising through a variety of genres on adequate budgets.")

He established himself by attaching himself "to as much material as possible. Sling enough mud at the wall, something will stick." He also earned a reputation for reliability. "Deliver the goods, above and beyond creative and fiscal expectations. Mr Reliable is a popular guy. Specialise in the difficult. No task too great, no budget too small. Work breeds work, particularly if you leave your producers smiling rather than unhappy. Low-budget genre film making does not mean you have to check your personality at the door."

He returned to Australia to make Official Denial (1993) on the Gold Coast. Back in the US he did Night of the Demons 2 (1994) and Leprechaun 3 (1995). He went back to Australia to make Sahara (1995), then did Escape Clause (1996), Leprechaun 4: In Space (1996), Doomsday Rock (1997), Atomic Dog (1998), and Voyage of Terror (1998).

Trenchard-Smith made the true crime film Happy Face Murders (1999), which is one of his favourite movies. Trenchard-Smith says the 2000 Fox Family Channel movie Britannic was the best of the three disaster movies he made around this time. It got him the job directing Megiddo: The Omega Code 2.

In 2011, Trenchard Smith said his passion project is to do a revisionist history of Richard III.

=== Personal life ===
Since 1975, Trenchard-Smith has been married to Dr. Margaret Gerard Trenchard-Smith (née Enger), an American Byzantine historian and retired actress whom he had cast in Deathcheaters, Stunt Rock, Out of the Body and The Siege of Firebase Gloria. They have two sons, Eric and Alexander, and live in Oregon, where they own pet deer. His hobbies include history and épée fencing, for which he has held a lifelong passion.

== Career appraisal ==
Trenchard Smith once said this of his own films:

There is something you always get in a Trenchard-Smith movie: pace, a strong visual sense, and what the movie is actually about told to you very persuasively. Whatever I do, I'll still be applying a sense of pace: trying to find where the joke is and trying to make the film look a lot bigger than it cost.

He says his main advice for directing is:

Be a good leader, kind father, energetic brigade commander to your cast and crew; no one gives their best in an atmosphere of blame and fear, as happens on big star driven movies; humour is much more effective in team management; try to make your own enthusiasm for the project contagious to everybody. Then pick locations that have natural production value... Plan well. Shot list. Make every hour of shooting count.

His favourite among his own movies are The Man From Hong Kong, BMX Bandits, Dead End Drive In, The Siege Of Firebase Gloria, Night Of The Demons 2 and Happy Face Murders.

His main influences growing up were Alfred Hitchcock, Henry Hathaway, Anthony Mann, J. Lee Thompson, Robert Aldrich, Raoul Walsh, King Vidor and John Ford.

== List of works ==
=== Filmography ===
==== Film ====
Year	Title	Director	Writer	Producer
1975	The Man from Hong Kong	Yes	Yes	Uncredited
1976	Deathcheaters	Yes	Yes	Yes
1978	Stunt Rock	Yes	Yes	Uncredited
1979	Day of the Assassin	Yes	No	No
1982	Turkey Shoot	Yes	Uncredited	No
1983	BMX Bandits	Yes	Uncredited	No
1986	Frog Dreaming	Yes	No	No
1986	Jenny Kissed Me	Yes	No	No
1986	Dead End Drive-In	Yes	No	No
1988	Day of the Panther	Yes	Yes	No
1988	Strike of the Panther	Yes	Yes	No
1988	Out of the Body	Yes	No	No
1989	The Siege of Firebase Gloria	Yes	Yes	No
1994	Night of the Demons 2	Yes	No	No
1995	Leprechaun 3	Yes	No	No
1996	Leprechaun 4: In Space	Yes	No	No
2001	Megiddo: The Omega Code 2	Yes	No	No
2006	In Her Line of Fire	Yes	No	Yes
2009	Pimpin' Pee Wee	Yes	No	No
2010	Arctic Blast	Yes	No	No
2013	Absolute Deception	Yes	No	Yes
2014	Drive Hard	Yes	Yes	No

Documentary works

Year	Title	Director	Writer	Producer	Himself	Notes
1975	The Love Epidemic	Yes	Yes	Yes	No	Semi-documentary
1978	Hospitals Don't Burn Down!	Yes	No	No	Yes	Semi-documentary short film Roles: Doctor/Voice of Cleaner (uncredited)
1980	The Dangerous Summer	Yes	No	No	No	Short film
1989	Dangerfreaks	Yes	Yes	Yes	Yes	Compilation film

Acting roles

Year	Title	Role	Notes
1975	The Man from Hong Kong	Martial Arts Heavy	
1976	Deathcheaters	Hit & Run Director	
1978	Stunt Rock	Himself	Uncredited
1982	Turkey Shoot	Officer arresting Paul	Uncredited
2013	Absolute Deception	Police Commissioner	Uncredited

Other credits

Year	Title	Role
1977	The Last Wave	Promotional consultant
1982	Blood Tide	Co-producer and creative consultant
1990	Deathstone	Executive producer
1991	Delta Force 3: The Killing Game	Creative consultant
2000	Crash and Byrnes	Second unit director and creative consultant
2007	Ice Spiders	Creative consultant
2014	Turkey Shoot	Executive producer

==== Television ====
Documentary series

Year	Title	Director	Writer	Producer	Notes
1972	Marty Feldman in Australia	Yes	No	No	
1972	The Big Screen Scene	Yes	No	No	
1972	For Valor	Yes	No	No	
1973	The Stuntmen	Yes	Yes	Yes	
1973	The World of Kung Fu	Yes	Yes	Yes	
1973	Inside Alvin Purple	Yes	Yes	Yes	
1974	Kung Fu Killers	Yes	Yes	Yes	
1974	The Making of Stone	Yes	No	No	
1976	Danger Freaks	Yes	Yes	Yes	Miniseries; Also additional photography and self

TV series

Year	Title	Notes
1984–85	Five Mile Creek	2 episodes
1985	Special Squad	2 episodes
1989	Mission: Impossible	2 episodes
1991–92	Tarzán	10 episodes
1991–92	Silk Stalkings	5 episodes
1993	Time Trax	2 episodes
1994	High Tide	Episode "Sitting Ducks"
1995–97	Flipper	5 episodes
2000	The Others	Episode "Unnamed"
2009	Fusion	Webseries pilot
2011	Chemistry	7 episodes

TV movies

Year	Title	Director	Writer	Producer
1993	Official Denial	Yes	No	No
1995	Sahara	Yes	No	No
1995	The Last Bullet	No	Yes	No
1996	Escape Clause	Yes	No	No
1997	Doomsday Rock	Yes	No	No
1998	Atomic Dog	Yes	No	No
2002	Voyage of Terror	Yes	No	No
1999	Happy Face Murders	Yes	No	No
2000	Britannic	Yes	Yes	No
2002	Seconds to Spare	Yes	Yes	No
2002	Sightings: Heartland Ghost	Yes	No	No
2003	The Paradise Virus	Yes	No	Yes
2003	DC 9/11: Time of Crisis	Yes	No	No
2005	Phantom Below	Yes	No	Yes
2006	Long Lost Son	Yes	No	No
2007	Aztec Rex	Yes	No	No
2009	Malibu Shark Attack	No	No	Yes
2011	The Cabin	Yes	No	No

=== Bibliography ===
- Alice Through the Multiverse (2016, originally published as The Headsman's Daughter): ISBN 978-1983540868
- Adventures in the B Movie Trade (2020): ISBN 979-8674846086

=== Unrealized projects ===
- Bad Fruit (1976) – he was to be executive producer on this proposed $350,000 Keith Salvat project about people in Sydney in the early 1950s.
- Siege of Sydney (1977) – project written by Michael Cove which Trenchard-Smith wanted to make after Deathcheaters about ex-CIA operatives who plant a nuclear device on Pinchgut Island and demand $5 million. The intended budget was $450,000, and Trenchard-Smith raised $200,000 from Cinema International Corporation, but they pulled out after the box office failure of Black Sunday (1977)
- Time Warp (c. 1980) – a $20 million science fiction film for The Walt Disney Company which was to be made in 1982 but was put on the back burner after the disappointing performance of The Black Hole (1979)
- Blowing Hot and Cold (1984) – originally announced as director
- Avengers of the South Seas (1984) – $4.6 million action adventure to be set in South China seas to reunite him with the producer and writer of BMX Bandits
- Roadwars (circa 1987) – film about modern gladiators set in the near future from the producer and writer of BMX Bandits
- The Executioner's Daughter (2003) – a "time-twisting paranormal thriller" for which Trenchard-Smith wrote a screenplay that was twice optioned for considerable amounts of money, but could not enter pre-production when neither Scarlett Johansson nor Keira Knightley could be engaged to play the protagonist. The rights were sold back to him, and he rewrote the screenplay as a novel that was self-published in 2016 under the title of The Headsman's Daughter. A revised and expanded edition of the novel, Alice Through the Multiverse, was released in 2018.
- Weekend Warriors (2013) – thriller about a young soldier who must save his comrades and brother from his vengeful mentor, announced as an Australian/UK co-production between Trenchard-Smith's frequent colleague David Hannay and The Spice Factory. Although casting was announced to be underway in 2013, no further announcements have been made.
- Sword Point (2013) – sports drama about a Chinese gymnast who takes up fencing; the project was intended to be Trenchard-Smith's tribute to the sport. Although he and Stunt Rock producer Martin Fink shopped the film to several Chinese production companies to have the film made as an Australian/Chinese co-production, no further announcements have been made.

=== Trailers ===
Dring the late 60s and 1970s, Trenchard Smith was one of the leading makers of film trailers in England and Australia. Among the films whose trailers he edited are:

- US/UK movies: Landraiders, Crossplot, Mission: Impossible vs. the Mob, Once Upon a Time in the West, A Man Called Sledge, Destiny of a Spy, Run a Crooked Mile, Take a Girl Like You, The Last Grenade, The Virgin Soldiers, The File of the Golden Goose, Hell Boats, Frankenstein Must Be Destroyed, The Horror of Frankenstein, Moon Zero Two, The Vampire Lovers, Julius Caesar, Kill Them All and Come Back Alone, The Bellstone Fox, The Italian Job
- Australian movies: Libido, Sunstruck, Picnic at Hanging Rock, Mad Dog Morgan, The Love Epidemic, The Man from Hong Kong, Deathcheaters, Petersen, Break of Day, Summerfield, The Irishman, Snapshot, Thirst, The Survivor, The FJ Holden, The Journalist, The Last Wave, Money Movers, Blue Fin, Long Weekend, My Brilliant Career, In Search of Anna, The Fourth Wish, Stone

== Collaborations ==
Brian Trenchard-Smith had cast certain actors in more than one of his films.

	The Love Epidemic	Kung Fu Killers	The Man from Hong Kong	Deathcheaters	Stunt Rock	Turkey Shoot	BMX Bandits	Frog Dreaming	Dead End Drive-In	Jenny Kissed Me	Out of the Body	Day of the Panther	Strike of the Panther	The Siege of Firebase Gloria	Night of the Demons 2	Leprechaun 3	Sahara	Leprechaun 4: In Space	Happy Face Murders	Megiddo: The Omega Code 2	Absolute Deception
Angelo; D'Angelo							X mark										X mark				
Warwick; Davis																X mark		X mark			
John; DeMita																X mark				X mark	
R. Lee; Ermey														X mark						X mark	
John; Ewart	X mark							X mark													
Noel; Ferrier				X mark		X mark															
Paris; Jefferson												X mark	X mark								
George; Lazenby		X mark	X mark																		
John; Ley						X mark	X mark				X mark										
Grant; Page	X mark	X mark	X mark	X mark	X mark																
Rick; Peters															X mark			X mark	X mark		
Steve; Rackman				X mark		X mark															X mark
Jim; Richards												X mark	X mark								
John; Stanton												X mark	X mark								
Edward; Stazak												X mark	X mark								
Henry; Thomas								X mark											X mark		
Brian; Trenchard-Smith			X mark	X mark	X mark	X mark															X mark
Margaret; Trenchard-Smith				X mark	X mark						X mark			X mark							
Roger; Ward			X mark	X mark		X mark															
Tamsin; West								X mark		X mark											
Wilbur; Wilde									X mark	X mark											

== See also ==
- Not Quite Hollywood
- Brennan, Richard, 'Brian Trenchard-Smith', Cinema Papers, Dec-Jan 1979-80
- Jones, Brian, 'A Horse for all courses', Cinema Papers, March 1986 p 27-28
