= Doomsday Rock =

1997 science fiction TV movie

- Genre: Action; Sci-Fi; Thriller
- Written by: David Bourla; Michael Norell
- Directed by: Brian Trenchard-Smith
- Starring: Connie Sellecca; Ed Marinaro; Jessica Walter; William Devane
- Theme music composer: Sam Winans
- Country of origin: United States
- Original language: English

Production
- Executive producers: Stephen P. Jarchow; James Shavick
- Producers: Paul Colichman; Mark R. Harris; Rosanne Milliken
- Production location: Vancouver
- Cinematography: Rod Parkhurst
- Editors: Eric Hill; Stephen R. Myers
- Running time: 96 minutes

Original release
- Network: The Family Channel
- Release: August 24, 1997

Doomsday Rock is a 1997 made-for-TV science fiction film about an asteroid on a collision course with Earth. The film premiered on The Family Channel on August 24, 1997.

== Plot ==
Dr. Karl Sorenson, a noted astronomer, believes that an asteroid is on a collision course with Earth based on his study of an ancient civilization's prophetic timeline, but few other scientists believe him. Desperate, he leads a group of militant followers to take over a nuclear missile silo in order to use its missiles to destroy the asteroid.

== Cast ==
- William Devane as Dr. Karl Sorenson
- Connie Sellecca as Katherine
- Ed Marinaro as Paul, FBI Agent
- Jessica Walter as Secretary
- Roger Cross as Gibson
- Gary Jones as Gil Naspeth
- Rick Ravanello as Parks
- Jason Gray-Stanford as Sgt. Thompson
- Manoj Sood as Missile Commander
