= Chemistry (TV series) =

2011 American drama television series

- Genre: Thriller; Comedy drama
- Created by: Richard Christian Matheson; Norman Steinberg
- Written by: Richard Christian Matheson; Norman Steinberg
- Directed by: Mark Haber; Brian Trenchard-Smith; Michael Robison
- Starring: Ana Alexander; Jonathan Chase; Ragan Brooks; Jeremy Kent Jackson; Sally Kellerman; Chad Everett
- Composer: Eric Allaman
- Country of origin: United States
- Original language: English
- No. of seasons: 1
- No. of episodes: 13

Production
- Executive producers: Norman Steinberg; Richard Christian Matheson
- Production location: Los Angeles
- Camera setup: Film; Single-camera
- Running time: 26 minutes
- Production companies: Ostar Productions; HBO Entertainment

Original release
- Network: Cinemax
- Release: August 19 – November 18, 2011

Chemistry is an American drama–comedy television series that debuted on Cinemax on August 19, 2011. The last episode of its first season aired on November 18, 2011.

== Cast and characters ==
- Ana Alexander as Liz Campano: An LAPD policewoman and Michael's primary love interest. She was a painter and expressed her feelings through her art.
- Jonathan Chase as Michael Strathmore: A corporate lawyer. His affair with Liz risked both his profession and personal life.
- Ragan Brooks as Jocelyn Delacorte: Michael's fiancée. She eventually became aware of Michael's affair and left him on their third anniversary. She later returned and wanted a polyamorous relationship.
- Chad Everett as Vic Strathmore: Michael's late father and relationship adviser. He was married eight times, the last union to a car showroom model named Chantal, and felt his multiple divorces impacted Michael's views on relationships. Vic died in the series finale.
- Sally Kellerman as Lola: Liz's eccentric neighbor. She was an artist and claimed to have been intimate with Sigmund Freud and Pablo Picasso. She was seen exclusively in cut scenes.
- Jeremy Kent Jackson as Luther: Michael's colleague. Nearly everything that he mentioned had a sexual connotation.
- Asante Jones as Preston Hull: Liz's police partner. He was an aspiring author and joined the force to do research for a novel.
- Eric Pierpoint as Arthur Delacorte: Father of the Delacorte sisters and boss of Michael and Luther.
- Augie Duke as Pemmie Delacorte: Jocelyn's sister and paramour of Luther. She had a husband named Seth and was on parole for an undisclosed crime.
- Angel McCord as Merle.
- Jessica Clark as Chantal Strathmore: Vic's wife and Michael's stepmother.
- Morgan Fairchild as Michael's Mother: She appeared on the series finale to settle Vic's estate after his death.

== Episodes ==
No.	Title	Directed by	Written by	Original release date
1	"Upside Down"	Mark Haber	Richard Christian Matheson and Norman Steinberg	August 19, 2011
2	"A Kiss is Not a Kiss"	Mark Haber	Richard Christian Matheson and Norman Steinberg	August 26, 2011
3	"Smoke & Mirrors"	Mark Haber	Richard Christian Matheson and Norman Steinberg	September 9, 2011
4	"Montecito"	Mark Haber	Richard Christian Matheson and Norman Steinberg	September 16, 2011
5	"Flesh Wounds"	Brian Trenchard-Smith	Richard Christian Matheson and Norman Steinberg	September 23, 2011
6	"Downtime"	Brian Trenchard-Smith	Richard Christian Matheson and Norman Steinberg	September 30, 2011
7	"The Proposition"	Brian Trenchard-Smith	Richard Christian Matheson and Norman Steinberg	October 7, 2011
8	"Night on Bald Mountain"	Brian Trenchard-Smith	Richard Christian Matheson and Norman Steinberg	October 14, 2011
9	"Split"	Michael Robison	Richard Christian Matheson and Norman Steinberg	October 21, 2011
10	"Lust in Translation"	Michael Robison	Richard Christian Matheson and Norman Steinberg	October 28, 2011
11	"Intimacy"	Brian Trenchard-Smith	Richard Christian Matheson and Norman Steinberg	November 4, 2011
12	"In or Out: Part 1"	Brian Trenchard-Smith	Richard Christian Matheson and Norman Steinberg	November 11, 2011
13	"In or Out: Part 2"	Brian Trenchard-Smith	Richard Christian Matheson and Norman Steinberg	November 18, 2011

== Ratings ==
The episode "Downtime" which aired on September 30, 2011 garnered 0.242 million viewers, a 0.2 Household rating, and a 0.1 Adults 18–49 rating.
