= Lew Luton =

Australian actor, singer and presenter

Lew Luton (1933–2018) was an Australian actor, singer and presenter. He worked for ten years in Britain appearing on shows like Crossroads. He was a DJ and presenter of Teen Time when he got into acting. Annette Andre, who worked with him, recalled he was "strange, but we got on well."

== Select credits ==
- Wuthering Heights (1959)
- Whiplash ep - "The Actress" (1961)
- The Countess from Hong Kong (1967)
- Moon Zero Two (1969)
