= Murcheson Creek =

- Written by: Robert Caswell
- Directed by: Terry Bourke
- Starring: Mark Edwards; Sandra Lee; Abigail; Rowena Wallace; Cornelia Frances
- Music by: Sven Libaek
- Country of origin: Australia
- Original language: English

Production
- Producer: Ross Hawthorn
- Cinematography: Alan Grice
- Editor: Ron Williams
- Running time: 73 minutes
- Production company: Cash Harmon Productions

Original release
- Release: 18 June 1976 (Sydney)
- Release: 25 June 1976 (Melbourne)
- Release: 1 October 1976

Murcheson Creek is a 1976 Australian television film which was a feature-length pilot for an unmade TV series.

== Premise ==
A young Sydney doctor returns to his home town in the outback and discovers his father is dead. He takes over his family practice.

== Cast ==
- Mark Edwards as Dr. Andrew Murcheson
- Sandra Lee as Dr. Myfanwy McKenna
- Abigail as Donna Lewis
- Rowena Wallace as Karen Fields
- Dennis Miller
- Cornelia Frances
- Anne-Louise Lambert
- Gordon McDougall
- Philippa Baker
- John Orcsik
- Terry Bourke
- Gordon McDougall
