= The Man from Hong Kong =

1975 film by Brian Trenchard-Smith

- US film poster by Arnaldo Putzu
- Traditional Chinese: 直搗黃龍
- Simplified Chinese: 直捣黄龙
- Literal meaning: The Yellow Dragon's Direct Attack
- Hanyu Pinyin: Zhí Dǎo Huánglóng
- Jyutping: Zik6 Dou2 Wong4 Lung4
- Directed by: Brian Trenchard-Smith
- Written by: Brian Trenchard-Smith
- Produced by: Raymond Chow; John Fraser
- Starring: Jimmy Wang Yu; George Lazenby; Hugh Keays-Byrne; Roger Ward; Ros Speirs; Rebecca Gilling; Frank Thring
- Cinematography: Russell Boyd
- Edited by: Ron Williams; Peter Cheung
- Music by: Noel Quinlan
- Production companies: Golden Harvest; The Movie Company
- Distributed by: British Empire Films (Australia); Golden Harvest (Hong Kong); 20th Century-Fox (United States)
- Release dates: 31 July 1975 (Hong Kong); 5 September 1975 (Australia)
- Running time: 106 minutes
- Countries: Australia; Hong Kong
- Languages: English; Mandarin
- Budget: A$550,000
- Box office: A$1.07 million (Australia); HK$1.09 million (Hong Kong)

The Man from Hong Kong (Chinese: 直搗黃龍), originally released in the US as The Dragon Flies, is a 1975 action film written and directed by Brian Trenchard-Smith in his directorial debut and starring Jimmy Wang Yu and George Lazenby, with Hugh Keays-Byrne, Roger Ward, Rosalind Speirs, Rebecca Gilling, Sammo Hung, Grant Page and Frank Thring in supporting roles. The first film to be made as an international coproduction between Australia and Hong Kong, it serves as a satire of the James Bond and Dirty Harry franchises, combined with tropes of the concurrent chopsocky craze. Its plot follows Inspector Fang Sing Leng (Wang) of the RHKPF's Special Branch, who travels to Sydney to perform an extradition, only to find himself locked in battle with Jack Wilton (Lazenby), the city's most powerful crime lord.

Having gained experience as an editor of film trailers and director of television documentaries, Trenchard-Smith established a connection with Golden Harvest producers Raymond Chow and Andre Morgan while making two TV specials, The World of Kung Fu (1973) and Kung Fu Killers (1974). Originally conceived as a Bruce Lee vehicle, the film was reconfigured as Wang's English-language debut following Lee's death; much of the remaining cast and crew had previously worked on Trenchard-Smith's documentary films and on Sandy Harbutt's outlaw biker film Stone (1974). Its budget was jointly funded by Golden Harvest, Greater Union and the Australian Film Development Commission.

The Man from Hong Kong features multiple large-scale action scenes with elaborate, dangerous stunts. It includes a fight scene between Hung and Ward atop Uluru/Ayers Rock as the film's opening setpiece, several car chases devised by Stone's Peter Armstrong, hang-gliding sequences performed over Hong Kong and Sydney Harbour by Page — who would achieve further recognition as the stunt coordinator for Mad Max (1979) — and a climactic battle between Wang and Lazenby in which the latter is briefly set on fire, which caused injury to the actor's hand. The film's theme song, "Sky High" by Jigsaw, became a one-hit wonder during the latter half of 1975.

Although the film was released in a wide array of markets and turned a profit, The Man from Hong Kong was not the blockbuster Trenchard-Smith and the film's producers had hoped it would be upon its initial release; in Australia, its box office performance was limited as a result of its R rating. Later restored by the Australian National Film and Sound Archive, it has since garnered a cult following as one of the key films of the Ozploitation cycle and Trenchard-Smith's career, and was prominently featured in the documentary Not Quite Hollywood: The Wild, Untold Story of Ozploitation! (2008).

== Plot ==
While working undercover at Ayers Rock, Inspector Bob Taylor of the Australian Federal Narcotics Bureau confronts Win Chan, a Chinese drug courier, and his partner; Chan gives chase, leading to a fight on top of the site during which Taylor eventually bests him, while his partner is killed when his car crashes and explodes after being pursued by a police helicopter. Due to Chan's refusal to cooperate and inability to speak English, the Royal Hong Kong Police Force assigns one of its Special Branch's finest officers, Inspector Fang Sing Leng — who is not only a polyglot but also a deadly master of kung fu and sharpshooting — to assist Taylor and his partner, Sergeant Morrie Grosse, in extraditing him.

Prior to leaving for Sydney, Fang's exercises at the RHKPF's training school at Wong Chuk Hang are interrupted by the unexpected arrival of journalist Caroline Thorne via a hang-glider, which she flew while conducting research for an article. Although the kite is confiscated, Fang and Caroline flirt and share a tryst, after which Fang agrees to return the glider and rendezvous with her while he is in Sydney.

After meeting Taylor and Grosse, Fang — to Taylor's amusement and Grosse's outrage — brutally interrogates Chan. He learns that Chan works for Jack Wilton, an import/export businessman whose varied portfolio, including the operation of a martial arts school, is merely a smokescreen for his criminal activities; his wide array of legitimate and illegitimate interests effectively make him Sydney's most powerful man and near-impossible to arrest. Just before his trial, Chan is shot dead, prompting Fang to chase the sniper, John Grantley, through the streets of Paddington and into a Chinese restaurant. Their ensuing fight results in Grantley's death; Fang discovers that he was a martial arts instructor in Wilton's employ.

Despite Taylor and Grosse's warnings, Fang insists on confronting Wilton; a meeting with Willard, his chief secretary, proves fruitless. During his morning exercise, he recalls his promise to meet with Caroline after seeing a pigeon in-flight, which reminds him of her hang-gliding; she takes him as her guest to a party at Wilton's mansion. After a "demonstration" between Fang, Wilton and his thugs turns brutal, he is ordered to leave after Wilton trains a crossbow on him. Fang then infiltrates his martial arts school and is near-fatally injured in an extended fight with its staff and students. He hitches a ride with two university students, Angelica and her friend Mei Ling, who take him to the veterinary clinic of the former's father in the countryside of Bathurst. Fang romances Angelica as he is nursed back to health, but insists on returning to Sydney.

Angered by Fang's interference, Wilton has Willard trace his whereabouts from the licence plate of Angelica's van, and sends a squad of assassins after him as he and Angelica drive back to the city. A bomb planted on the van causes it to crash, killing Angelica. Enraged, Fang commandeers a Chrysler Valiant Charger and defeats the gangsters through a series of violent car chases. Learning of Fang's survival, Wilton barricades himself in the penthouse of his skyscraper headquarters.

With Caroline's help, Fang flies her glider over Sydney Harbour, landing on the roof of the skyscraper. Allowing a line of rope to reach the bottom of the building, he swings into the penthouse, where he battles and overpowers Wilton after his clothes and hand are burnt by his fireplace. Retrieving a bag of heroin from a nearby safe — which is heavily stocked with drugs and weapons — Fang tapes a grenade to Wilton's mouth and threatens to arm it unless he writes and signs a confession describing his crimes. Wilton does so, but Fang accidentally pulls the pin when he is distracted by one of Wilton's guards, prompting him to seal Wilton in the safe. He abseils to the ground, where he is met by Taylor and Grosse, presenting the drugs and confession to them as evidence. The grenade detonates the other bombs in the safe, killing Wilton and destroying the penthouse in a spectacular explosion. Finally won over by Fang's methods, Taylor and Grosse laugh in amazement.

== Cast ==
- Jimmy Wang Yu as Inspector Fang Sing Leng
  - Roy Chiao as Inspector Fang Sing Leng (voice, uncredited)
- George Lazenby as Jack Wilton
- Hugh Keays-Byrne as Sergeant Morrie Grosse
- Roger Ward as Inspector Bob Taylor
- Ros Speirs as Caroline Thorne
- Rebecca Gilling as Angelica Pearson
- Sammo Hung (as Hung Kam Po) as Win Chan
- Grant Page as John Grantley, Wilton's Assassin
- Frank Thring as Willard
- Deryck Barnes as Dr. Derek Pearson, Angelica's Father
- Ian Jamieson as Drug Courier
- Bill Hunter as Peterson, Martial Arts School Manager
- Elaine Wong as Mei Ling, Angelica's Friend
- John Orcsik as Charles, Caroline's Boyfriend
- Geoffrey Brown as Martial Arts Heavy
- Kevin Broadribb as Martial Arts Heavy
- Brian Trenchard-Smith as Martial Arts Heavy
- Peter Armstrong as Wilton's Bodyguard
- Rangi Nikora as Wilton's Bodyguard
- Bob Hicks as Wilton's Bodyguard
- Max Aspin as Wilton's Bodyguard
- Robert Fay as Wilton's Bodyguard
- Ruth Erica as Wilton's Target Girl
- Andre Morgan as Rooftop Guard (uncredited)
- Phillip Avalon as Taylor's Uluru Partner (uncredited)

=== Stunt team ===
- Peter Armstrong - Stunt Coordinator
- Grant Page - Stunt Coordinator
- Sammo Hung - Martial Arts Choreographer
- Rangi Nikora
- Sha Yuan-Pian
- Ian Jamieson
- Yin Yuan
- Bob Hicks
- Robert Chan
- Max Aspin
- To Wai-Wo
- Gerry Gauslaa
- Ke-Ming Lin
- Alan Walker

== Production ==
The first Australian/Hong Kong co-production was made during the height of the kung fu film craze and the Australian New Wave. According to some sources, Wang Yu directed parts of the film. Trenchard Smith says Wang was difficult to deal with and shooting was hard - "there was a great clash of personalities, coupled with the inevitable mutual distrust that occurs in a co-production where both sides think the other is trying to rip them off." However he says John Fraser of Greater Union was very supportive and encouraging. The film's team of producers also included the late David Hannay.

Trenchard-Smith received nine offers of co-production after the film's release.

The film was originally budgeted at $450,000 but increased when the producers wanted more action sequences and a hit song on the soundtrack. British band Jigsaw recorded "Sky High", which plays during the opening credits of the film. It went number one in several countries. Production funding came from Greater Union, Golden Harvest and the Australian Film Development Corporation. The film's production company, The Movie Company, was owned 50% by Trenchard-Smith and 50% by Greater Union.

Wang Yu was injured in a hang gliding sequence while Lazenby had severe burns on his hands during a fight scene.

== Music ==
The theme song, "Sky High", was composed and written by Clive Scott and Des Dyer and was performed by their band Jigsaw. Unlike the official single version, the film version of the hit song is notably different from its disco-pop as it features a more orchestral arrangement. The film's score was composed by Noel Quinlan.

Originally released on vinyl by Overseas Records exclusively in Japan in 1977, the score was eventually released on CD as a bonus feature of Umbrella Entertainment's 2021 "Ozploitation Classics" Blu-ray re-release of the film. The re-released score was mastered for CD by Jamie Blanks.

The Man From Hong Kong (Original Soundtrack)

Soundtrack album by Noel Quinlan
- Released: 1977 (original release); 8 December 2021 (re-release)
- Genres: Funk/Soul, Jazz, Stage & Screen
- Length: 52:24 (original release); 1:01:58 (re-release)
- Labels: Overseas Records (original release); Umbrella Entertainment (re-release)
- Producer: Noel Quinlan

=== Original tracklist ===
All tracks are written by Noel Quinlan, except where noted.

Side 1
No.	Title	Length
1.	"Sky High" (Clive Scott, Des Dyer)	3:53
2.	"The Carrier From Hong Kong"	4:23
3.	"Airport"	1:34
4.	"Foot Chase"	2:19
5.	"Wilton Building"	0:59
6.	"Party"	3:27
7.	"The Incursion"	7:07
8.	"Escape"	1:34

Side 2
No.	Title	Lead vocals	Length
1.	"Love Theme From Sky High Part 1"	Deena Webster Greene	3:23
2.	"Bomb On Car"		1:55
3.	"Love Theme From Sky High Part 2"		2:21
4.	"The Revenge (Car Chase)"		3:07
5.	"Kite In The Sky"		2:07
6.	"Roof Top"		3:10
7.	"The Last Moment Of "The Bad" Wilton"		6:46
8.	"Sky High (Reprise)" (Clive Scott, Des Dyer)		4:19

=== Re-release tracklist ===
All music is composed by Noel Quinlan, except where noted.

No.	Title	Lead vocals	Length
1.	"Rock Top Battle"		3:08
2.	"Chopper Chase"		4:02
3.	"Sky High [Opening Credits]" (Clive Scott, Des Dyer)		3:57
4.	"Airport"		1:39
5.	"Foot Chase"		2:15
6.	"Wilton Building"		1:01
7.	"Working Out"		1:59
8.	"Kite Slow"		1:08
9.	"Party"		3:37
10.	"The Incursion"		3:53
11.	"After Fight"		0:47
12.	"Escape"		1:37
13.	"Drinking Soup"		1:16
14.	"Maurie's Theme"		2:41
15.	"A Man Is A Man Is A Man [Part 1]"	Deena Webster Greene	2:35
16.	"A Man Is A Man Is A Man [Part 2]"	Deena Webster Greene	1:29
17.	"Bomb On Car"		1:36
18.	"Revenge"		2:57
19.	"Kite Fast"		2:06
20.	"Rooftop"		3:12
21.	"The Last Moment of Wilton"		6:39
22.	"Sky High [Closing Credits]" (Clive Scott, Des Dyer)		4:24
23.	"Power [Unused Title Track]"	Peter Nelson	3:43

== Release ==
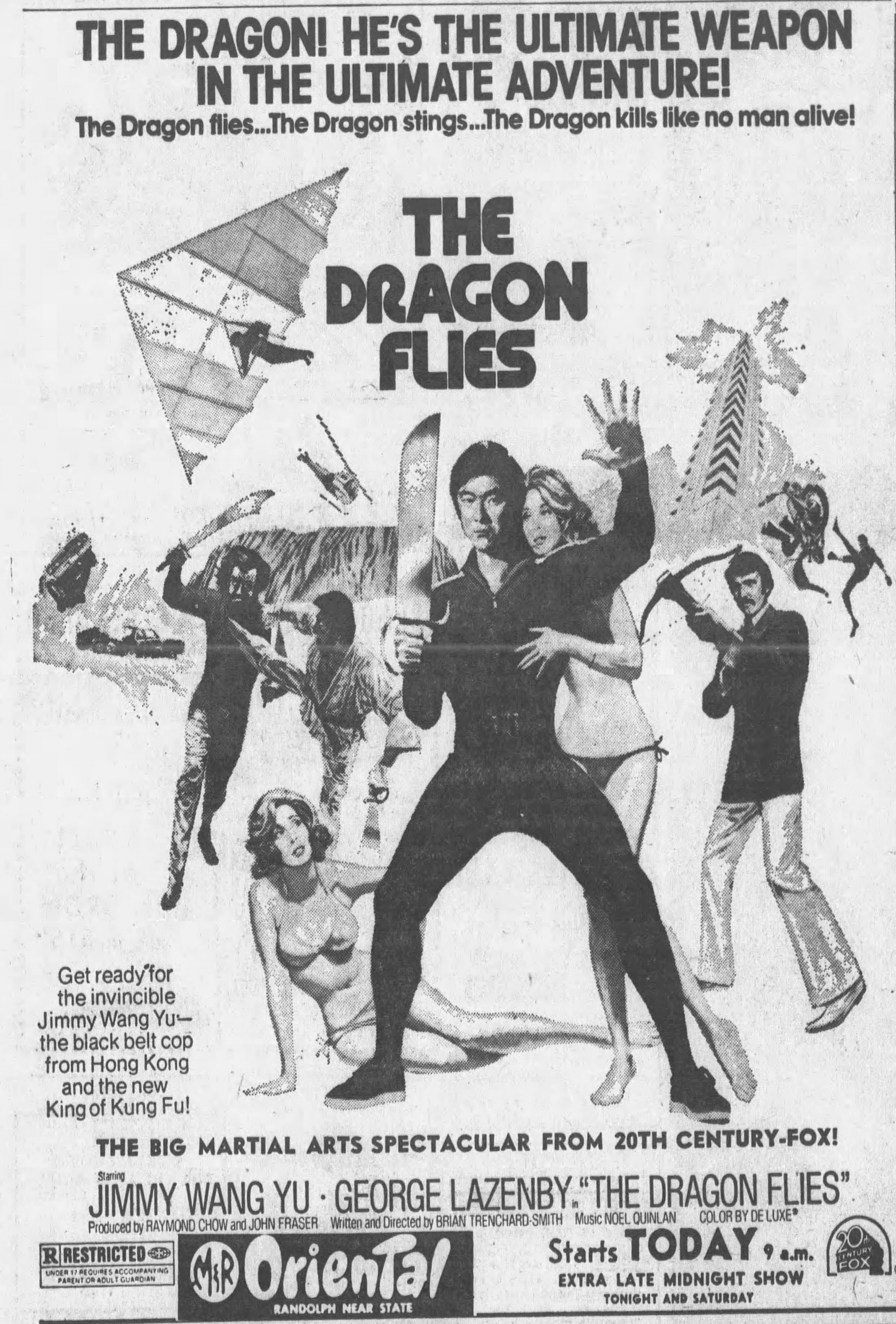
U.S. theatrical advertisement, 1975

At a screening of a restored print in Sydney, Trenchard-Smith said the film didn't do as well as was hoped due to its R adults only rating. However US rights were sold for $200,000 and at Cannes the film sold around the world for a minimum of $500,000 putting it in profit even before it had been released. 20th Century-Fox distributed the film in the United States.

The film was released in the US as The Dragon Flies.

== Reception ==
On review aggregator website Rotten Tomatoes, the film holds an approval rating of 100% based on 7 reviews, and an average rating of 7.5/10.

Andrew L. Urban from Urban Cinefile called it "one of the few Australian made kung fu action movies and is also notable for its cinematography by Russell Boyd, who went on to win the Oscar for his work on Master and Commander: The Far Side of the World.

The Los Angeles Times called it "a slick, shallow, well-photographed Australian-Chinese movie which has substituted do-it-yourself decapitation with mass demolition."

The Observer called it "a witless display of non-stop mayhem."

=== Accolades ===
Peter Cheung won the Golden Horse Film Festival Award for Best Film Editing.

== See also ==
- Cinema of Australia
