= Gordon McDougall =

Australian actor (1916–1991)

- McDougall as amateur inventor Les Whittaker wth wife Norma in Number 96
- Born: Gordon Sholto McDougall; 7 February 1916; Glasgow, Scotland
- Died: 18 May 1991 (aged 75); Sydney, New South Wales, Australia
- Occupation: Actor
- Years active: Stage/radio 1940– 2023, screen 1969-1987
- Spouse: Margaret Mackie

Gordon Sholto McDougall (born 7 February 1916 – 18 May 1991) was a Scottish-born Australian actor. He trained at the Glasgow Athenaeum (now known as The Royal Conservatoire of Scotland).

After immigrating to Australia, in 1951 he worked primarily in theatre in numerous productions as both an actor, producer and director, but became best known in TV soap opera Number 96, firstly as amateur inventor Les Whittaker, who was a comedy character opposite Sheila Kennelly, his character perished in the infamous bomb blast storyline, after ratings of the serial plumetted how ever realized that the decision was a mistake, and McDougall was subsequently brought back, albeit as the less successful character of Les's aristocratic brother Andrew Whittaker, the Lord McCraddenow.

== Career ==
=== Theatre and radio ===
McDougall started acting professionally in 1940 working in various facets of the entertainment industry, including radio and stage. He emigrated to Australia in 1951 and started his career on stage over all-in a long career he appeared in more than 50 theatre productions.

These theatre roles included Arthur Miller's Death of a Salesman, Cat Among the Pigeons, Habeas Corpus, musicals 1776 and Promises, Promises. He played in Shakespeare's Twelfth Night and Much Ado About Nothing for the Nimrod Theatre.

=== Television ===
McDougall appeared in the ABC adaptation of Hesba Fay Brinsmead's Pastures of the Blue Crane in 1969.

In the late 1960s and early 1970s he had guest roles in Crawford Productions police procedurals Homicide and Division 4 and a regular role in 1972 comedy series A Nice Day at the Office which ran for seven episodes.

McDougall found his widest audience through his role of amateur inventor and hospital orderly Les Whittaker, husband to brassy barmaid Norma (Sheila Kennelly), in hit soap opera Number 96. Comedy characters Les and Norma joined the series early in its 1972–77 run and became very popular and along with most of the show's regular cast, McDougall reprised his role in the 1974 film version of the series.

After a fall in ratings in 1975 Les was killed off in a dramatic revamp of the series: the famous bomb storyline. It had been decided that Les's constant crazy inventions were becoming too silly, and that his death would open up the character of Norma to new romances and other storylines. The Number 96 producers soon realised that killing Les was a mistake, and McDougall was returned to the series in late 1976 as Les's long-lost brother, the aristocratic Lord Andrew McCraddenow. The new character did not work as well as Les had, and six months later both Andrew and Norma were written out of the series during another cast revamp.

Post-96 McDougall appeared in a small role in the film The Fourth Wish starring John Meillon and thriller The Killing of Angel Street and acted in other Australian television films and had guest roles in such drama television series as Chopper Squad, Prisoner and A Country Practice, and a guest part in sitcom Mother and Son.

== Filmography (selected) ==
=== Film ===
Title	Year	Role	Type
Ned Kelly	1970	Tarleton (uncredited)	Feature film
Chaser	1973		TV movie
Is There Anybody There?	1976	Cookson	TV movie
The Fourth Wish	1976	Policeman	Film
Born to Run	1977	Horace Weaver	TV movie
Number 96	1974	Les Whittaker	Feature film
The Killing of Angel Street	1981	Sir Arthur Wadham	Feature film

=== Television ===
Title	Year	Role	Type
Pastures of the Blue Crane	1969		TV miniseries
Riptide	1969	Sgt. Paul Stranes	TV series, 1 episode
Homicide	1966-70	Max Baker / Rev. Horton / Senior Detective Vince Reilly	TV series
The Rovers	1970	Ben Ashdown	TV series
The Long Arm	1970	Stubby	TV series
Mrs. Finnegan	1970	Supt Johnson	TV series
Division 4	1969-71	Bruce Clarke / Suttle / Bill Jenkins	TV series
The Group	1971	James McGregor	TV series, 1 episode
A Nice Day at the Office	1972	Claude Fogarty	TV series, 7 episodes
Number 96	1972-77	Les Whittaker / Andrew Whittaker (aka Lord McCradonow)	TV series, 133 episodes
Rush	1976	Doctor Newton	TV series
Solo One	1976	Jack Norton	TV series
The Emigrants	1976	Hostel Manager	TV miniseries
Murcheson Creek	1976		TV pilot
Chopper Squad	1978	Joe	TV series
Golden Soak	1979	Petersen	TV miniseries
The Magical World of Disney	1979	Horace Wever	TV series, 2 episodes
Love Thy Neighbour in Australia	1979	Vicar	TV series, 1 episode
The Best of Friends	1982	Doctor	TV series, 1 episode
Prisoner	1982	Dr. Braithwaite	TV series, 1 episode
Mother and Son	1983	Lionel	TV series, 1 episode
Winners	1985	Confessor	TV series
A Country Practice	1983 / 1986	Mr. Bradshaw / Shaun Barnes Snr.	TV series
Relative Merits	1987		TV miniseries

== Personal life and death ==
McDougall retired from acting in 1987.

He was married to Margaret Mackie and died in Sydney, Australia on 18 May 1991, aged 75.
