= Mark Edwards (actor) =

Australian actor

Mark Edwards (born 1942) is an Australian actor best known for his appearances in British horror films of the early 1970s.

He was cast as Cassio in a production of Othello at the Old Tote in 1965.

He studied in Bristol, England in the mid 1960s then moved to England and was in steady work. His best known credit was in Blood from the Mummy's Tomb.

Edwards moved back to Australia in the mid 1970s.

== Select filmography ==
=== Film ===
- Rusty Bugles (1965) (TV movie)
- The Recruiting Officer (1965)
- The Wednesday Play - All Out for Kangaroo Valley (1969) as Robert
- Cromwell (1970)
- Blood from the Mummy's Tomb (1971) as Tod Browning
- The Last Valley (1971)
- Tower of Evil (1972) as Adam
- The Boldest Job in the West (1972) as Michigan
- Diamonds on Wheels (TV movie, 1973) as Whiteman
- Terror in the Wax Museum (1973) as Sergeant Michael Hawks
- Murcheson Creek (1976) (TV movie) as Dr Andrew Murcheson
- Hospitals Don't Burn Down! (1978)
- Shimmering Light (1978) (TV movie)
- Roadhouse (1979) (TV movie)

=== Television ===
- Consider Your Verdict
- Adventures of the Seaspray (episode: A Strange Charter) (1967)
- ITV Playhouse (episode: Bon Voyage) (1968)
- The Mind of Mr. J.G. Reeder (episode: The Troupe) (1969)
- Counterstrike (episode: Backlash) (1969)
- ITV Sunday Night Theatre (1969) as Hester Lilly
- W. Somerset Maugham (episode: Virtue) (1970)
- A Family at War (1970)
- The Troubleshooters (episode: The Bent Bonanza) (1971)
- Love Story (episode: Sweet Sorrow) (1972)
- A Point in Time (1973)
- Arthur of the Britons (episode: People of the Plough) (1973)
- The Carnforth Practice (1974)
- La joven casada (1975)

== Theatre ==
- Coventry medieval mystery plays with the New England Theatre Centre
- Wuthering Heights for the Education Department
- Christ in the Concrete City
- How the West Was Lost (1964) by Barry Creyton
- Othello (1965) as Cassio (with Ron Haddrick) at Old Tote Theatre
- A Severed Head (1965)
- Wrong Side of the Moon
- Faithful in My Fashion
- Porgy and Bess
