= Michael Carman =

Australian actor

- Born: 10 November 1951 (age 75)
- Occupation: Actor
- Years active: 1967–present

Michael Carman (born 10 November 1951) is an Australian film, television, and theatre actor. He trained at St Martins Theatre from 1969 to 1971 and attended Swinburne Film and Television School from 1971 to 1974.

== Filmography ==
=== Film ===
Year	Title	Role	Type
	Sadisco	Dr Sadisco	
1975	The Box	Manhunt Film Crew Cameraman	Feature film
1975	Melanie and Me		Feature film
1975	The Devil in Evening Dress	Igor / Pallbearer / Stagehand	Documentary film
1976	Oz	Tin Man / Mechanic / Drummer	Feature film
1976	The Devil's Playground	Nigel Ryan	Feature film
1977	Raw Deal	Sir Frederick	Feature film
1978	The Chant of Jimmie Blacksmith	JC Thomas	Feature film
1978	Mouth to Mouth	Tony	Feature film
1980	Blood Money	Assistant Manager	Feature film
1981	The Bush Bunch: The Cliffhanger	Wireless Operator	Short film
1982	Desolation Angels	Bank Teller	Feature film
1983	The Body Corporate	David Wallace	TV movie
1984	Kindred Spirits	Photographer	TV movie
1984	Silver City	Policeman	Feature film
1986	The Blue Lightning	Robert's	TV movie
1987	Tudawali	Conroy	TV movie
1988	A Waltz Through the Hills	Sergeant Rawlings	Feature film
1988	Day of the Panther	Damien Zukor	Feature film
1990	Quigley Down Under	Deserter	Feature film
1990	Tea & Pictures	George Lambert	Short film
1993	Hercules Returns	Sir Michael Kent	Feature film
1993	Flynn (aka My Forgotten Man)	Young Errol actor	Feature film
1993	Seething Night		Short film
1995	The Feds: Suspect	Vice Principal	TV movie
2002	Crazy Richard	Narrator	Feature film
2003	The Wannabes	Jimmy King	Feature film
2003	Max's Dreaming		Feature film
2003	Roundabout	Policeman 2	Short film
2004	Strange Bedfellows	Laurie	Feature film
2005	The Extra	Loftus Green	Feature film
2008	Nim's Island	Ship's Captain	Feature film
2009	Personality Plus	Joel	Feature film
2011	Killer Elite	the Don	Feature film
2012	Jack Irish: Bad Debts	Eddie Dollery	TV movie
2012	The Mystery of a Hansom Cab	Malcolm Royston	TV movie
2015	Franky Fingers and the Apartment Upstairs	Franky Fingers	Short film
2016	Dogstar: Christmas in Space	Baba Ganoush / Uncle Phil / Uncle Bill / Gus / Comic Seller (voice)	Animated TV movie
2017	Arc Raider	Narrator	Short film
2018	Winchester	Frank	Feature film

=== Television ===
Year	Title	Role	Type
1967	Bellbird	Andy	TV series
1974	The Box	Director	TV series, 1 episode
1974–75	Division 4	Johnno Abbott / James Watts / Monk	TV series, 3 episodes
1974–75	Matlock Police	Vern Henderson / Sid Johnston	TV series, 2 episodes
1974–76	Homicide	James Clark / D24 Officer / David Prior / Vince Taylor	TV series, 4 episodes
1976	Tandarra	Adam Nash	TV miniseries, 1 episode
1978	Against the Wind	Redcoat	TV miniseries, 2 episodes
1978	The Truckies	Jeff	TV series, 12 episodes
1977–78	The Sullivans	Italian Prisoner / Mick the Toff	TV series, 6 episodes
1979	Twenty Good Years	Digger Farrell	TV series, 9 episodes
1980	Lawson's Mates	Dave Regan	TV series, 1 episode
1980	Sam's Luck	Dave Bristow	TV series, 6 episodes
1978–80	Cop Shop	Bert Fuller / Neville Cook / Simon Mitchell	TV series, 4 episodes
1981	Bellamy	Rossi	TV miniseries, 1 episode
1981	Holiday Island	Tony Brewster	TV series, 1 episode
1982	Sons and Daughters	Les Brown	TV series, 2 episodes
1980–83	Prisoner	Newsman / Reporter Gary	TV series, 3 episodes
1983	All the Rivers Run	Alby	TV miniseries, 2 episodes
1984	Carson's Law	Gregory / Aubrey St John	TV series, 2 episodes
1988	The Gerry Connolly Show	Various characters	TV series, 6 episodes
1990	Mission Impossible	Serapis	TV series, 1 episode
1990	Col'n Carpenter	Brent	TV series, 1 episode
1991	The Flying Doctors	Willie Ryan	TV series, 1 episode
1991	Chances	Roland Harvey	TV series, 1 episode
1993	Newlyweds	Johnny	TV series, 1 episode
1993	Phoenix	Morris Bannerman	TV series, 1 episode
1994–95	Frontline	Voiceover	TV series, 2 episodes
1996	Mercury	Nick Loder	TV miniseries, 2 episodes
1996	The Genie from Down Under	Customs Officer	TV series, 1 episode
1997	Get a Life	Dr Mark Latham	TV series
1997	Kangaroo Palace	Sandy's Father / BBC Academic	TV miniseries
1998	Good Guys Bad Guys	Marcie	TV series, 1 episode
1998	Totally Full Frontal	Additional Cast	TV series, 1 episode
1998	The Silver Brumby	Currawong / Wombat / Mopoke (voice)	Animated TV series, 1 episode
2000	Stingers	Devere	TV series, 1 episode
2000	The New Adventures of Ocean Girl	Galiel/ Laziah / Captain Sharkana	TV series, 10 episodes
2001	Blonde	Director H	TV miniseries, 2 episodes
1995–2005	Blue Heelers	Albie O'Connell / Robbie Prior	TV series, 9 episodes
2000	On the Beach	US anchorman	TV miniseries
2002–05	MDA	Mark Matthews	TV series, 30 episodes
2004–05	The Secret Life of Us	Jon Davis / John	TV series, 2 episodes
2008	City Homicide	Dermott Roach	TV series
1995–2009	Neighbours	Tony Hartman / 'Hot' Rod Falzon	TV series, 8 episodes
2010	Dead Gorgeous	Edwin Fingers	TV series, 1 episodes
2010	Wilfred	Roger Dalton	TV series, 1 episode
2011	Twentysomething	Resl Estate Agent	TV series, 1 episode
2007–11	Dogstar	Baba Ganoush / Uncle Phil / Uncle Bill / Gus / Comic Seller (voice)	TV series, 7 episodes
2013–14	Jar Dwellers SOS	Ring Master	TV series, 17 episodes
2017	Newton's Law	Hugo Spencer	TV miniseries, 1 episode
2019	Bad Mothers	Patrick Muller	TV miniseries, 2 episodes
2021	Clickbait	Bookstore Owner	TV miniseries, 1 episode

=== Video games ===
Year	Title	Role	Type
1996	The Dame Was Loaded	Jake	Video game (MS-DOS)
