= Wallas Eaton =

English actor (1917–1995)

- Born: 18 February 1917; Leicester, Leicestershire, England
- Died: 3 November 1995 (aged 78); Australia
- Other names: Wallace Eaton; Wallis Eaton
- Occupation: Actor

Wallas Eaton (18 February 1917 – 3 November 1995), sometimes credited as Wallace Eaton or Wallis Eaton, was an English film, radio, television and theatre actor. He is perhaps best remembered for his voice roles between 1949 and 1960 in the BBC radio-comedy serial Take It from Here.

== Early life ==
Eaton was born in Leicester, Leicestershire. He was educated at the Alderman Newton's School, and later would read History and English at Christ's College, Cambridge. Eaton joined the Army in 1940, and served with distinction during World War II, serving in the Fan Bay plotting room at Dover, which targeted enemy shipping in the Channel, and eventually becoming a major in charge of a searchlight battery.

== Career ==
His first stage appearance was at the Theatre Royal in his home town of Leicester in 1936. Three years later he made his London debut playing the small part of the Announcer in Auden and Isherwood's The Ascent of F6 at the Old Vic. The following year Eaton played the Second Priest in Eliot's Murder in the Cathedral in 1940 and he followed this with what was his first comedy role, in The Body Was Well Nourished by Sidney Gilliat and Frank Launder.

In 1944, he appeared in Shaw's Too True To Be Good at the Lyric Theatre, Hammersmith. Eaton enjoyed a series of good, if small, roles, appearing alongside Vivien Leigh at the Phoenix Theatre in 1945 in Thornton Wilder's The Skin of Our Teeth. In films, Eaton had a role in Caesar and Cleopatra (1945).

In addition to working on the long-running BBC radio comedy Take It from Here, Eaton appeared in more than twenty-five films and over fifty television productions. His debut for BBC Television was in Arthur Askey's top- rated series Before Your Very Eyes in 1952, and he had parts in the Frankie Howerd series Up Pompeii and The Rivals of Sherlock Holmes, and Michael Palin's and Terry Jones' 1969 The Complete and Utter History of Britain television comedy sketch show.

Eaton's favourite pastime was sailing, and he made a trip to Australia in 1975 to pursue his interest, after which he settled there permanently. He featured in the Australian soap The Young Doctors in 1979 as Roland Perry, a rich friend of principal character Ada Simmonds. He also made a few appearances in later episodes of the television drama serial A Country Practice.

== Death ==
He died in Australia on 3 November 1995, aged 78.

== Partial filmography ==
- Dual Alibi (1947) – Court Official (uncredited)
- A Man's Affair (1949) – Leonard
- Dark Interval (1950)
- Up for the Cup (1950) – Barrowboy
- Chelsea Story (1951) – Danny
- Adventure in the Hopfields (1954) – Junk Shop Owner
- Alive on Saturday (1957) – Garton
- Two-Way Stretch (1960) – Gate Warder (Night)
- Operation Cupid (1960) – Cecil
- This Sporting Life (1963) – Waiter
- Inspector Clouseau (1968) – Hoeffler
- Isadora (1968) – Archer
- Lock Up Your Daughters (1969) – Staff
- O Lucky Man! (1973) – John Stone (Coffee Factory) / Col. Steiger / Prison Warder / Meths Drinker / Film Executive
- Mad Dog Morgan (1976) – Macpherson
- Deathcheaters (1976) – 2nd Police Sergeant
- The Lost Islands (1976) – School headmaster Quilter
- The Last Wave (1977) – Morgue Doctor
- Save the Lady (1982) – Trotter
- Goodbye Paradise (1983) – Clyde
- Undercover (1984) – Mr. Breedlove
- Annie's Coming Out (1984) – Dr. Rowell
- The Pickwick Papers (1985) – Voice
- Kidnapped (1986) – Voice
- Outback (1989) – Grassmore
- Tanamera – Lion of Singapore (1989, miniseries)
