= Ralph Cotterill =

Australian actor (1932–2023)

- Born: 26 March 1932; Yorkshire, England
- Died: 7 May 2023 (aged 91); Cairns, Queensland, Australia
- Occupation: Actor

Ralph Cotterill (26 March 1932 – 7 May 2023) was an English-born Australian actor. Born in Yorkshire, Cotterill arrived in Australia in 1973 while touring with the Royal Shakespeare Company. He went on to have a long career in Australia, both on stage and screen.

== Filmography ==
=== Film ===
Year	Title	Role	Type
1974	Essington		TV movie
1976	Deathcheaters	Uncivil servant	Feature film
1977	Journey Among Women	Corporal Porteous	Feature film
1980	The Chain Reaction	Gray	Feature film
1981	Alison's Birthday	Brian Healey	Feature film
1981	The Survivor	Slater	Feature film
1982	Prisoners	Holmby	Feature film
1984	Where the Green Ants Dream	Fletcher	Feature film
1984	Starship (aka 2084 or Lorca and the Outlaws)	Captain Jewitt	Feature film
1985	Burke and Wills	Charley Gray	Feature film
1986	Shark's Paradise	Dr Baxter	TV movie
1987	Howling III	Professor Sharpe	Feature film
1987	The Lighthorsemen	General Friedrich Kress von Kressenstein	Feature film
1989	Sons of Steel	Karzoff	Feature film
1993	Bad Boy Bubby	Pop	Feature film
1995	The Beat Manifesto	Darcy	Short film
2005	The Proposition	Dr Bantrey	Feature film
2007	December Boys	Shellback	Feature film
2013	The Great Gatsby	Gatsby's father	Feature film (scenes cut)

=== Television ===
Year	Title	Role	Type
1972	Behind the Legend	Hal Gye	TV anthology series
1977	Beyond Reasonable Doubt	Prison Officer Lange	Documentary series
1981	Punishment	Russell Davis	TV series
	Five Mile Creek	Dr Gluck	TV series
1988	All the Way	Mr Bower	TV series
1992	Ultraman: Towards the Future	Captain Arthur Grant	TV series
2006	The Timeless Land	Finn	TV miniseries
