= Grant Page =

Australian stuntman (1939–2024)

- Born: Grantley John Page; August 6, 1939; Adelaide, South Australia, Australia
- Died: 14 March 2024 (aged 85); Kendall, New South Wales, Australia
- Occupation: Stuntman

Grantley John Page (August 6, 1939 – 14 March 2024) was an Australian stuntman who worked mostly during the 1970s and 1980s. Page was the stunt coordinator for the popular Australian action movies The Man from Hong Kong (1975) and Mad Max (1979), as well as other Australian and overseas films including the cult horror film Death Ship (1980). He starred in the 1970s Australian TV series Danger Freaks, which, while ostensibly a documentary of his professional work with various stunt performers, emphasized the spectacular visual results from these collaborations. Grant is featured in a cameo appearance in the Blur music video "M.O.R."

One of the things Grant Page is best remembered for is a failed stunt attempt on The Don Lane Show during a live broadcast on 6 September 1976 in which he attempted to jump over a moving car. He eventually tried the stunt again, this time successfully, on the same show in 1983.

Page played the killer in Roadgames (1981), which is the favourite Australian film of Quentin Tarantino.

Page starred, along with the band Sorcery, in the 1978 film Stunt Rock, which combined a fictional plotline about a female journalist who is intrigued by stuntman Page with stunts by Page and musical performances by Sorcery, a hard rock band who incorporated magic into their act.

Page died on 14 March 2024, at the age of 85, when a car that he was driving hit a tree.
