= Joe McCormick (actor) =

Australian actor, director and TV pioneer

Joe McCormick was an actor, director, and presenter. He was accidentally shot by a blank shotgun shell while filming an episode of Whiplash. McCormick went on to direct many episodes of outdoor filmed Australian children adventure series for Pacific Films in 1960s, including Olivia Newton-John's first musical.

He played the captain-father in the pilot of the Adventures of the Seaspray, which he also directed, but was replaced for the series run by Walter Brown.

== Filmography ==
=== Film ===
- On the Beach (1959) as Ackerman
- One Bright Day (TV film) (1959) as Julian Prescott
- Thunder on Sycamore Street (TV film) (1960)

=== Television ===
- Tuesday at One (1957) as Presenter
- The Joe McCormick Show (1959) as Presenter
- Whiplash (1960–61)
- Consider Your Verdict (1962)
- Time Out (1963)
- Barley Charlie (1964)
- Homicide (1966)

=== As director ===
- The Adventures of the Terrible Ten (1960) - (also writer)
- The Ten Again (1963)
- Adventures of the Seaspray (1965)
- Funny Things Happen Down Under (1965)
- The Magic Boomerang (1965–66)
