= Waka Attewell =

New Zealand cinematographer

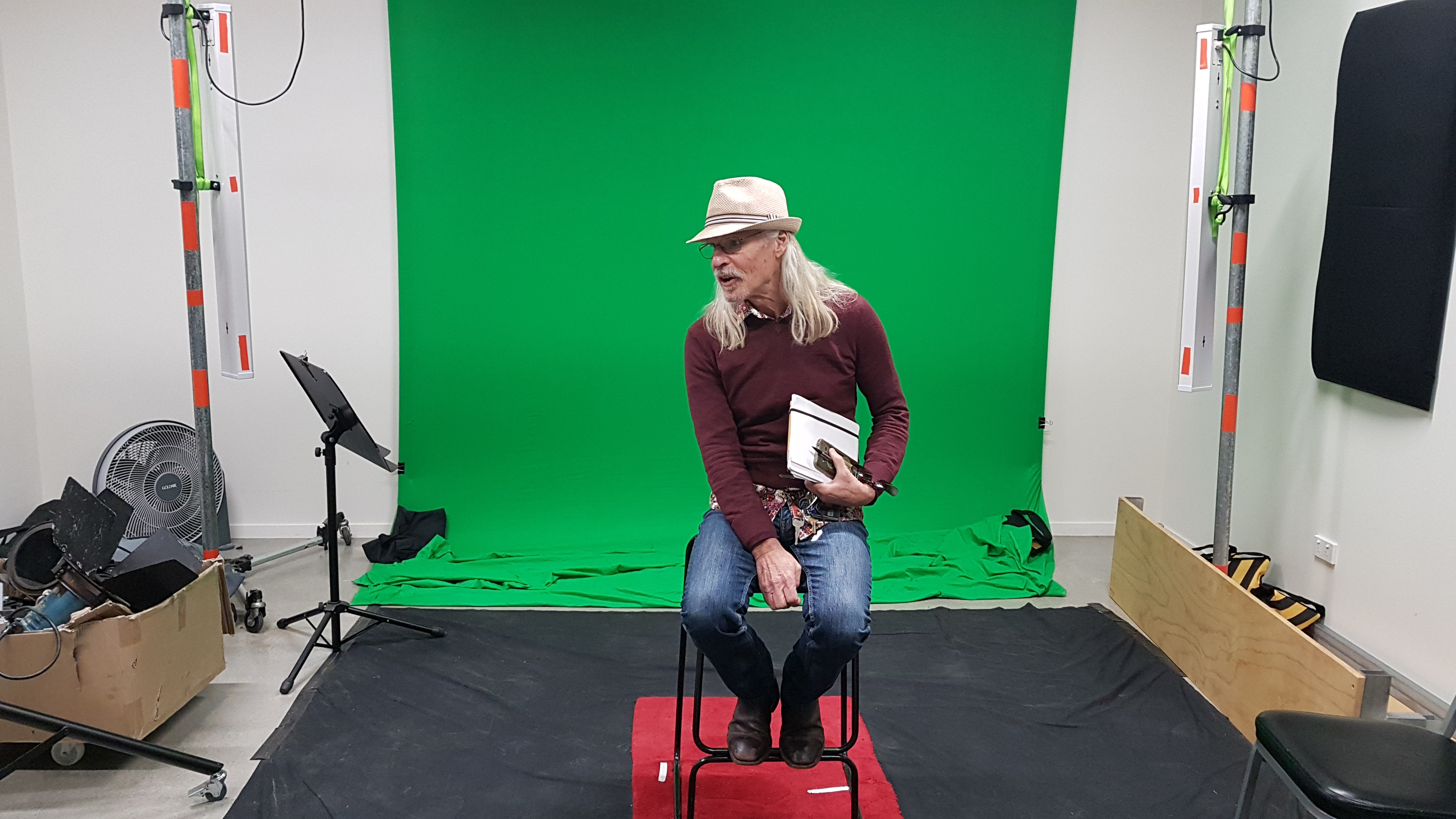
Waka Attewell on a site visit to a studio (2019)

Warrick 'Waka' Attewell is a New Zealand cinematographer who over a long career has worked on many notable film and television productions. He joined John O'Shea's Pacific Films early in his career where he worked on Tangata Whenua - the People of the Land (1974), directed by Barry Barclay, and written and presented by Michael King. Independently and through his production company Valhalla Films, Attewell has filmed and directed short films, features, documentary, music video's and commercials. Developing future film makers has been part of Attewell's career, teaching cinematography at various film schools in New Zealand. Attewell has also worked with many well known New Zealand personalities and entertainers including briefly with Billy T James on a commercial. Attewell was director of photography on the documentary about Billy T James called Billy T: Te Movie (2011) . Most recently Attewell was cinematographer and concept director on the Undertow (2019) television series screened on Māori Television in New Zealand.

== Awards and nominations ==
2017 Nominated for Best Cinematography (with Alun Bollinger), Rialto Channel New Zealand Film Awards (The Moas) for The Great Maiden's Blush

1996 Best Cinematography Award, NZ Film and TV Awards for Whole of the Moon

1999 Honourable Mention - Children's Short Film Competition, Oberhausen International Short Film Festival (Germany) for The Murder House

== List of works ==
Selected list of credits:

Hillary: Ocean to Sky (2019), original camera, original sound recordist: Director Michael Dillon

Blerta Revisited (2001), cinematographer: Director Geoff Murphy

Whole of the Moon (1997), cinematographer: Director Ian Mune, New Zealand

Te Rua (1991), cinematographer: Director Barry Barclay

Starlight Hotel (1987), cinematographer: Director Sam Pillsbury

All the Way Up There (1979), cinematographer: Director Gaylene Preston

From the Ocean to the Sky (1979), camera, sound recordist: Director Michael Dillon

Tangata Whenua - the People of the Land (1974), camera: Director Barry Barclay
