= Te Rua =

1991 New Zealand feature film

- Directed by: Barry Barclay
- Written by: Barry Barclay
- Produced by: John O'Shea
- Starring: Donna Akersten; Anne Chamberlain; Emilio De Marchi
- Cinematography: Warrick Attewell; Rory O'Shea
- Edited by: Dell King; Simon Reece
- Music by: Dalvanius Prime
- Production companies: Pacific Films; New Zealand Film Commission
- Release date: 1991
- Running time: 105 minutes
- Countries: New Zealand; Germany
- Language: English

Te Rua is a 1991 New Zealand-German drama film directed and written by Barry Barclay and produced by John O'Shea.

== Synopsis ==
An activist and a lawyer favour different approaches in getting stolen Māori carvings in a Berlin museum back home.

== Cast ==
- Donna Akersten as Fiona Gilbert
- Anne Chamberlain as Reporter
- Emilio De Marchi
- Hori Ahipene as Saul
- James Beaumont as TV Director
- Paki Cherrington as William Ropata
- Stuart Devenie as Hamish MacMillan
- Whetu Fala as Mereata Barnes
- Alice Fraser as Nurse
- Maria Fitzi as Hanna Lehmann
- Nissie Herewini as Nanny Matai
- Peter Kaa as Peter Huata
- Wi Kuki Kaa as Rewi
- Walter Kreye as Dr. Sattler
- Matiu Mareikura as Taki Ruru
- Günter Meisner as Prof. Biederstedt
- Dalvanius Prime as Self
- Vanessa Rare as Helen Marangai
- Tilly Reedy as Mere Marangai
- Jürgen Thormann as Dieter Goetz
- Nadja Reichardt
- Lisa Riecken

== Production ==
Producer John O'Shea was the founder of the independent film company Pacific Films.

== Reviews ==
- 1991 Variety.
- 1992 New Internationalist Reviews - Te Rua "...grapples with the global controversy of aboriginal artifacts being caged in the institutions of another culture..." .

== Awards and nominations ==
- 1992 New Zealand film and television awards nominated Best Performance in a Supporting Role - Vanessa Rare
