= Terence Bayler =

New Zealand actor (1930–2016)

- Born: 24 January 1930; Whanganui, New Zealand
- Died: 2 August 2016 (aged 86); London, England
- Education: Royal Academy of Dramatic Art
- Occupation: Actor
- Years active: 1952–2010

Terence Bayler (24 January 1930 – 2 August 2016) was a New Zealand film, television, and stage actor. His most memorable roles were in Monty Python's Life of Brian (1979) and Harry Potter and the Philosopher's Stone (2001).

== Biography ==
Bayler was born in Whanganui, the son of Amy (née Allomes) and Harold Bayler, a stagehand. His first film appearance was a starring role in New Zealand film Broken Barrier (1952). Bayler then spent the majority of his six-decade-long acting career in England, although he also appeared in 1981 New Zealand feature Pictures and BBC mini-series The Other Side of Paradise (1992), filmed partly in Rarotonga.

Broken Barrier was the only locally made feature shot in New Zealand during the 1950s. Bayler starred as a young journalist who falls in love with a Māori woman. The film won healthy audiences in his home territory. It was directed by Roger Mirams and John O'Shea – O'Shea went on to direct the only New Zealand feature films made in the 60s, drama Runaway and musical Don't Let it Get You.

Bayler was given stitches above an eye after he was injured in a sword fight with actor Jon Finch (playing Macbeth) during the shooting of Roman Polanski's 1971 adaptation of Shakespeare's Macbeth.

Bayler's associations with Monty Python date from 1975, when he appeared in Eric Idle's BBC TV series Rutland Weekend Television. This led to his appearance as Leggy Mountbatten, manager of fictional Beatles-parody band The Rutles, in American-made TV movie All You Need Is Cash (1978). Idle also cast him in his play Pass the Butler.

He had a small role as Mr. Gregory in Monty Python's Life of Brian (1979), and he appeared in two more of Python member Terry Gilliam's films, Time Bandits (1981) and Brazil (1985).

== Filmography ==
=== Film ===
Year	Title	Role	Notes
1952	Broken Barrier	Tom Sullivan	
1955	The Whiteoak Chronicles: The Building of Jalna	Robert Vaughan	TV film
1956	Alice's Adventures in Wonderland		TV film
1956	The Battle of the River Plate	Stoker – HMS Achilles	Uncredited
1961	Royal Foundation	Court Orderly	TV film
1963	The Hi-Jackers	Constable	
1970	Vile Bodies	The Major	TV film
1971	Macbeth	Macduff	
1974	Doctor Watson and the Darkwater Hall Mystery	Carlos	TV film
1976	The Snow Queen	Robber Captain	TV film
1976	The Hunchback of Notre Dame	Cardinal	TV film
1978	The Rutles: All You Need Is Cash	Leggy Mountbatten	TV film
1978	The Light Princess	Lord Chamberlain	TV film
1979	Monty Python's Life of Brian	Gregory	
1981	Time Bandits	Lucien	
1981	Pictures	John Rochfort	
1984	This Office Life	Penny	TV film
1985	Brazil	T.V. Commercial Presenter	
1987	Crystalstone	Policeman	
1993	The Remains of the Day	Trimmer	
2001	Harry Potter and the Philosopher's Stone	The Bloody Baron	
2008	Chemical Wedding	Professor Brent	

=== Television ===
Year	Title	Role	Notes
1959	Spy-Catcher		Episode: "The Gentle Gestapo Man"
1959	BBC Sunday Night Theatre	George Rawlings	Episode: "The Pohutukawa Tree"
1960	Probation Officer	First Policeman	1 episode
1960–1962	ITV Television Playhouse	Sergeant Gregory	2 episodes
1961	You Can't Win	Archie	Episode: "Professional Status"
1961	Hamlet	Player King	2 episodes
1961	BBC Sunday-Night Play	Jeremy Hopkirk	Episode: "The Big Noise"
1961	ITV Play of the Week	Checker	Episode: "Countdown at Woomera"
1963	Moonstrike	Bernard	2 episodes
1963	Compact	Raven	2 episodes
1963	Maigret	Marcel	Episode: "The Judge's House"
1964	ITV Play of the Week	Private Fletcher	Episode: "Jacko at War"
1966	Mystery and Imagination	Nemeth	Episode: "Carmilla"
1966	Doctor Who	Yendom	Episode: "The Return"
1969	Doctor Who	Major Barrington	Episode: "The War Games"
1969	The Very Merry Widow and How	Waiter	Episode: "How About It?"
1969	The Troubleshooters	David Neville	Episode: "Let's All Drop Out Together"
1969	W. Somerset Maugham	Jean-Pierre	Episode: "The Three Fat Women of Antibes"
1970	Ivanhoe	Chief Marshal	2 episodes
1970	As Good Cooks Go	P.C. Wilson	Episode: "Frying Squad"
1970	Play for Today	Stephen Calman	Episode: "The Lie"
1971	The Rivals of Sherlock Holmes	The Duke	Episode: "The Ripening Rubies"
1971	Play for Today	Duty Clerk	Episode: "Traitor"
1972	Stage 2	Director of the Madhouse	Episode: "Peer Gynt"
1973	The Regiment	General Sir Herbert Kitchener	Episode: "Ambush"
1973	Justice	James Lywood	Episode: "Covenant for Quiet Enjoyment"
1973	A Picture of Katherine Mansfield	Jonathan Trout	1 episode
1974	The Brothers	Anthony Bromley	Episode: "The Hammond Account"
1974	Special Branch	Security Man	Episode: "Double Exposure"
1975	The Venturers	Trevor Darcey	Episode: "The Leak"
1975	Upstairs, Downstairs	Darrow Morton	Episode: "Joke Over"
1976	Centre Play	Major Woods	Episode: "Commonwealth Season: New Zealand – Old Man March Is Dead"
1978	Law & Order	Michael Messick QC	Miniseries
1978	A Soft Touch	RSPCA Inspector	Episode: "The Toad Work"
1978	BBC2 Play of the Week	Surgeon	Episode: "The Vanishing Army"
1978	BBC2 Play of the Week	Baron	Episode: "Renoir, My Father"
1980	Play for Today	Surgeon	Episode: "The Vanishing Army"
1980	The Squad	Commander Fenton	2 episodes
1984	Horizon	LCC chairman	Episode: "The Intelligence Man"
1984	Murder Not Proven?	Craigie Aitchison KC	Episode: "A Big Romping Boy"
1985	Summer Season	Kania	Episode: "A Still Small Shout"
1986	Artists and Models	Leading Actor	Episode: "The Passing Show"
1986	All at No 20	Mr. Warren	2 episodes
1987	Ffizz	Giles	Episode: "Pulling Together"
1987	Pulaski	Priest	Episode: "And the Killer of Rose Amelia Bonner"
1988	Me and My Girl	Harry	Episode: "The Story of Foxy-Features and Melon-Head"
1989	London's Burning	Mr. Osbourne	1 episode
1990	Omnibus	Pissarro	Episode: "Van Gogh"
1990	She-Wolf of London	Sir Robert	Episode: "Can't Keep a Dead Man Down"
1991	Ashenden	Military Chief	Miniseries
1992	The Other Side of Paradise	Colonel Fawcett	Miniseries
1992	The Bill	Mr. Axell	Episode: "Finders Keepers"
1993	Eye of the Storm	Matthew Montliskeard	1 episode
1993	Lipstick on Your Collar	General	Miniseries
1995	Dangerfield	Howard	Episode: "The Call Girl"
1995	Strange but True?	Reconstruction Cast	Episode: "UFOs"
1997	Bodyguards	Government Minister	Episode: "A Choice of Evils"
2004	The Courtroom	Wilson Arbutnot	Episode: "Nudist Beach"
2005	Life Begins	Jack Russell	Episode: "Break for Love"
