= David Morgan (businessman) =

Australian businessman (born 1947)

David Morgan AO
- Born: David Raymond Morgan; March 1947 (age 79); Melbourne, Victoria, Australia
- Occupations: Former Managing Director, Executive Chairman and Chairman of J.C. Flowers & Co. in charge of Europe and Asia Pacific; Former CEO, Westpac Banking Corporation
- Spouse: Ros Kelly

David Raymond Morgan AO (born March 1947) is an Australian businessman. He was CEO of Westpac Banking Corporation, one of Australia's four major banks from 1999 to 2008. He was respectively Managing Director, Executive Chairman and Chairman of J.C. Flowers & Co. in charge of Europe and Asia Pacific 2009 to 2016.

Morgan was also Chairman of Chi-X (Australia), Deputy Chairman of NIBC Bank in the Netherlands and a member of the supervisory board of HSH Nordbank in Germany. He was Senior Advisor to the board of Shinsei Bank in Japan; a non-executive Director of One Savings Bank; and of Castle Trust in the UK; and of Chicago Board of Exchange (Australia).

He is currently Chairman of UDC Finance, a leading New Zealand finance company. He is a former Chairman of the Australian Bankers Association.

== Early life and education ==
As a child, Morgan was an actor on shows including The Magic Boomerang and The Adventures of the Terrible Ten. He was also featured in the film Funny Things Happen Down Under, appearing alongside Olivia Newton-John.

Morgan played professional Australian Rules Football in the Australian Capital Territory before being approached by the Richmond Football Club, where he only played a few games in the pre-season before moving to London.

In primary school, Morgan went to Lloyd Street. Morgan was educated at Malvern Grammar School and later Melbourne High School. He studied economics at La Trobe University (1st Class Honours, top of class), before studying at the London School of Economics where he received a Master of Science in economics (with Distinction, including the Ely Devons prize for top student) and a doctorate of philosophy (economics). He attended Harvard Business School's six-week Advanced Management Program. While at La Trobe, Morgan was foundation president of the Sports Union, foundation captain of the football team, and also captain of the university's first cricket team. He played for the All Australian Universities (1969) and All Australian Amateurs (1970) football teams and was picked in the opening Richmond Australian Football League side of 1972. He set a new goal kicking record of 176 goals playing for La Trobe University in the Panton Hills League (1969).

He is the author of the book Over Taxation by Inflation, published by the Institute of Economic Affairs in 1977.

Morgan also served on the Board of Financial Markets Foundation for Children, whose purpose was to promote the health and welfare of children in Australia. He endowed a $45,000 scholarship to his alma mater, the London School of Economics, and sponsored the Joan Sutherland Scholarship program.

A biography – David Morgan: An Extraordinary Life by journalist Oliver Brown was published in March 2019.

== Professional career ==
=== Early career (1970-1990) ===
Morgan's early professional experience was primarily in the government and the financial sectors, having worked both for the International Monetary Fund in Washington D.C. in the 1970s and the Australian Federal Treasury during the 1980s. Morgan reached the position of Senior Deputy Secretary of Treasury during the Hawke-Keating Federal Government, where he contributed to government economic policy reform, specifically supporting the floating of the Australian dollar as well as financial deregulation more generally.

=== Westpac (1990-2008) ===
He joined Westpac in 1990 as deputy managing director of Westpac Financial Services Group and was appointed to the position of chief general manager, Asia Pacific Group in October 1991. In November 1992 he was appointed to the position of group executive, Retail Banking Group. After running the Retail Bank for two years, Morgan was appointed to the position of group executive, Institutional and International Banking Group. In 1997, he was appointed to the board of Westpac and became executive director. He was appointed CEO in 1999. While David was CEO of Westpac, it was assessed as the global sustainability leader for the banking sector in the Dow Jones Sustainability Index from 2004 to 2007. In December 2006, he announced that he would not be seeking another term as CEO of Westpac, and in 2008 he retired from the position.

From 2008 to 2009 he was on the board of BHP Biliton.

=== J.C. Flowers & Co. ===
In 2009 Morgan was appointed managing director at J.C. Flowers & Co. in charge of Europe and Asia Pacific. He was previously a chairman of J.C. Flowers (Australia) Pty Limited as well as a global operating partner of J.C. Flowers & Co. LLC.

== Personal life ==
Morgan is married to Ros Kelly, a former Minister in the Australian Federal Governments of Bob Hawke and Paul Keating.

== Awards and honors ==
Morgan was made an Officer of the Order of Australia in the Australia Day Honours of 2009 for his service as a leader in the development of policies for the financial sector. These policies affected the regulation of financial institutions, corporate social responsibility, and economic reform.

In 2008, Morgan chaired The Future Direction for the Australian Economy at the Prime Minister's Australia 2020 Summit.

In 2014 he was selected to join an international advisory panel to provide input to the Australian Government Financial System Inquiry.

== See also ==
- List of Caulfield Grammar School people

== Notes ==
Business positions
Preceded by Robert L. Joss	Chief Executive Officer of Westpac Banking Corporation; 1999 – 2008	Succeeded by Gail Kelly
