= Tama Poata =

New Zealand writer, actor, and activist

Tama Te Kapua Poata (3 April 1936 – 9 November 2005) was a New Zealand writer, actor, humanitarian and activist. He was from the Māori tribe of Ngāti Porou. He was also known as 'Tom,' the transliteration of 'Tama.'

== Background ==
Poata was born on the East Coast of New Zealand's North Island. He was educated at Tokomaru Bay High School. He lived in Wellington during the 1960s where he worked for the Drivers' Union.

== Films ==
Poata wrote the screenplay for the feature film Ngati (1987), directed by Barry Barclay and produced by John O'Shea. Ngati was the first film written and directed by Māori, and is of historical and cultural significance in New Zealand.

== Actor ==
Poata played the role of 'Sam' in Wild Horses (1983) a New Zealand western directed by Derek Morton, produced by John Barnett and starring Bruno Lawrence.

== Human Rights ==
Poata was a founding member and the secretary of the Māori Organisation on Human Rights (MOOHR) which took part in protests for Māori rights and also opposed New Zealand's involvement in the Vietnam War.

He was instrumental in organising the historic 1975 Land March to the New Zealand Parliament in Wellington, voicing Māori indigenous land rights and protection of their culture. He was also active in the anti-apartheid movement in New Zealand against South Africa and is credited with having coined the name Halt All Racist Tours (HART) the organisation which led and mobilised anti-apartheid protests trying to stop the South African rugby union team touring in New Zealand.

Poata was a member of Māori activist group Ngā Tamatoa who amongst other things campaigned for the Māori language to be recognised and supported by the government, leading to the Māori Language Act in 1987. They also were part of the 1975 Land March, led by Whina Cooper.

== Awards ==
- Best Original Screenplay for Ngati: 1988 New Zealand Listener Film & Television Awards
