= Vincent Gil =

Australian actor (1939–2022)

- Born: 1939; Sydney, New South Wales, Australia
- Died: 21 August 2022 (aged 83)
- Occupation: Actor
- Years active: 1963–2022

Vincent Gil (1939 – 21 August 2022), also credited as Vince Gil (sometimes misspelled with double L), was an Australian film and television actor, Gil best known for his portrayal of the character Nightrider in the 1979 Mel Gibson film Mad Max.

== Other credits ==
Gil also appeared in Stone and had also starred in many Australian television shows, such as Matlock Police, Neighbours, A Country Practice and Prisoner, as well as acted in theatre roles from his debut in the industry in 1963 until 2007. He died on 21 August 2022, at the age of 83.

== Filmography ==
=== Film ===
Title	Year	Role
The Swagman episode of Wednesday Theatre (TV movie)	1965	Tony
Carmen (TV movie)	1968	Escamillo
You Can't See 'round Corners (film version)	1969	Lennie Ryan
Stone	1974	Doctor Death
Solo	1978	Paul Robinson
Run from the Morning	1978	Stackwell
Magee and the Lady	1978	Miller
Golden Soak	1979	Westrop
Mad Max	1979	Nightrider
Snapshot	1979	Daryl
The Timeless Land	1980	Cunningham
Daily at Dawn	1981	
And/Or = One	1982	Peter
Channel Chaos	1985	Drunk
Shark's Paradise	1986	Murphy
Incident at Raven's Gate	1988	Skinner
Sebastian and the Sparrow	1988	Mick, the Streetworker
Ghosts... of the Civil Dead	1988	Ruben
Evil Angels (aka 'A Cry in the Dark)	1988	Roff
Police Crop: The Winchester Conspiracy	1990	Snowy Shepherd
Resistance	1992	Bull
Body Melt	1993	Pud
Encounters	1993	Farmer Evans
Terra Nova	1998	Hugh
Mallboy	2001	Mad Frank
The Bank	2001	Sheriff
Razor Eaters	2003	Lonnie Evans
The Long Lunch	2003	Elbridge Nash
Ki-Kids: Policias & Chefs (video)	2008	Viajero
Conspiracy Theory 365	2012	Toecutter Durham
Three Thousand Years of Longing	2022	Old Merchant

=== Television ===
Title	Year	Role
You Can't See 'Round Corners (TV series)	1967	Terry Howlett
The Battlers (TV series)	1968	Wayne Small
You Can't See 'round Corners (film version)	1967	Terry Howlett
Riptide (TV series)	1969	3 roles
The Rovers (TV series)	1970	Biker/Bert
The Long Arm	1970	Bob Fitch
Number 96 (TV series)	1972	Cliff Stevens
Division 4 (TV series)	1969–72	7 character roles
Ryan (TV series)	1974	Merve
Matlock Police (TV series)	1971/74	Bernie/Albert Tresize
Homicide (TV series)	1966–76	12 character roles
Rush	1976	Griffiths/Brady
The Box (TV series)	1976	Trevor Kane
Bluey (TV series)	1976	Detective Lee Hacker
Chopper Squad (TV series)	1977–79	2 roles
Against the Wind (miniseries)	1978	Quartermaster Laycock
Kingswood Country (TV sitcom)	1980	Gus McKenzie
Cop Shop (TV series)	1978–81	Various
Secret Valley (TV series)	1980–82	Moose
The Sullivans (TV series)	1982	Peter
Carson's Law (TV series)	1984	Curly Machin
Special Squad (TV series)	1984	Blindman
The Henderson Kids (TV series)	1985	Eric
Prisoner (aka Prisoner Cell Block H) (TV series)	1981–86	Various
Nancy Wake (miniseries)	1987	Jules
Bodysurfer (TV miniseries)	1989	Gus
G.P. (TV series)	1991	Snowy
Seven Deadly Sins (miniseries)	1993	
A Country Practice (TV series)	1993	Laurie Morgan
Body Melt	1993	Pud
Blue Heelers (TV series)	1997	Griff Hachstra
Neighbours (TV series)	1995–2001	Running Rivers/Vernon Wells
Ki-Kids: Policias & Chefs (video)	2008	Viajero
City Homicide (TV series)	2011	Bert Robson
The Doctor Blake Mysteries (TV series)	2015	Clarence Porter
