= Leave All Fair =

1985 New Zealand film

- Directed by: John Reid
- Written by: Stanley Harper; Maurice Pons; Jean Betts; John Reid
- Produced by: John O'Shea
- Starring: John Gielgud; Jane Birkin
- Cinematography: Bernard Lutic
- Edited by: Ian John
- Music by: Stephen McCurdy
- Production company: Pacific Films
- Release date: 1985
- Running time: 90 min.
- Countries: New Zealand; France
- Language: English

Leave All Fair is a 1985 New Zealand-French Drama (film and television) film starring John Gielgud as John Middleton Murry the husband of Katherine Mansfield. He is presented as a sanctimonious exploiter of her memory, who ill-treated her during their association. Jane Birkin plays both Mansfield in flashbacks and the fictitious Marie Taylor who finds a letter from the dying Mansfield to Murry in his papers.

The theme was developed by New Zealand director Stanley Harper, but he was fired two weeks before shooting, and John Reid took over the project, introducing the "ghost" element and the two time frames. Shot in France at Moulin d'Ande and St Pierre du Vauvray with finance raised by Pacific Films, the film had to be finished before the 1984 cut-off date for New Zealand tax breaks.

== Plot ==
The film is set in France in 1956, 33 years after the death of Mansfield and a year before Murry's own death. Murry visits André de Sarry a (fictional) French publisher who is about to publish an edition of her collected letters and journals. Murry is presented as struggling with his conscience as he recalls the ill and alone Mansfield (seen in flashbacks), and decides to publish almost all of her work.

de Sarry's New Zealand partner Marie Taylor reads Mansfield's work and among Middleton Murry's papers finds a letter to him from the dying Mansfield. She confronts him as "another exploitative male" who makes a sanctimonious speech at the book launch. The letter from Mansfield says (rather ambiguously):

I should like him to publish as little as possible …He will understand that I desire to leave as few traces of my camping ground as possible .... All my manuscripts I leave entirely to you to do what you like with .... Please destroy all letters you do not wish to keep and all papers .... Have a clean sweep.... and leave all fair, will you.

== Cast ==
- John Gielgud as John Middleton Murry
- Jane Birkin as both Katherine Mansfield and Marie Taylor
- Féodor Atkine as André de Sarry
- Simon Ward as young John (John Jeune)
- Louba Guertchikoff as Lisa
- Maurice Chevit as Alain
- Mireille Alcantara as Violetta
- Leonard Pezzino as Alfredo

== Film reception ==
Helen Martin says the film is "beautifully shot in the European tradition" and it was described by the Guardian's Don Ranvaud at the London Film Festival as "arguably the best film to come out of New Zealand to date", but Tom McWilliams in Listener criticised the portrayal of Middleton Murry as it "simplifies the KM/Murry relationship into a cliché". David Stratton in Variety said it was "a sober, affecting experience".
