= Ngati =

- Directed by: Barry Barclay
- Written by: Tama Poata
- Produced by: John O'Shea
- Starring: Wi Kuki Kaa
- Cinematography: Rory O'Shea
- Edited by: Dell King
- Production company: New Zealand Film Commission
- Release date: 1987
- Running time: 92 minutes
- Country: New Zealand
- Languages: English; Maori

Ngati is a 1987 New Zealand feature film directed by Barry Barclay, written by Tama Poata and produced by John O'Shea.

== Production ==
Ngati is of historical and cultural significance in New Zealand as it is the first feature film written and directed by Māori. Producer John O'Shea, an icon in New Zealand's film industry, was the founder of independent film company Pacific Films. The film is set in 1948 in a small town on the east coast of New Zealand during the impending closure of a freezing works and the threat of unemployment for the local community. Ngati was screened as part of Cannes' Critics Week.

== Synopsis ==
Set in and around the fictional town of Kapua in 1948, Ngati is the story of a Māori community. The film comprises three narrative threads: a boy, Ropata, is dying of leukaemia; the return of a young Australian doctor, Greg, and his discovery that he has Māori heritage; and the fight to keep the local freezing works open. Unique in tone and quietly powerful in its storytelling, Ngati was Barry Barclay's first dramatic feature and the first feature to be written and directed by Māori. Ngati screened in Critics' Week at Cannes.

== Cast ==
- Tuta Ngarimu Tamati as Uncle Eru
- Iranui Haig as Nanna Huia
- Tawai Moana as Nanna Ngaropi
- Michael Tibble as Tione
- Oliver Jones as Ropata
- Wi Kuki Kaa as Iwi
- Ross Girven as Greg Shaw
- Judy McIntosh as Jenny Bennett
- Connie Pewhairangi as Sally
- Alice Fraser as Sam Bennett
- Norman Fletcher as Dr. Paul Bennett

== Awards ==
- Best Film, Taormina Film Festival, Italy
- Best Film, Best Original Screenplay (Tama Poata), Best Male Actor (Wi Kuki Kaa), Best Female Actor (Judy McIntosh) : 1988 New Zealand Listener Film & Television Awards
  - Nominations for Best Director (Barry Barclay), Best Male Film Performance (Ross Girven), Female in a Supporting Role (Alice Fraser and Connie Pehairangi), Male Performance in a Supporting Role (Paki Cherrington), Cinematography (Rory O'Shea), Production Design (Matt Murphy), Editor (Dell King) and Score (Dalvanius Prime).
