= Grasscutter =

Grasscutter may refer to:

- Atta (ant), a genus of ants
- Greater cane rat, a species of rodent
- Kusanagi no Tsurugi, a legendary Japanese sword
- Lawn mower, a device to cut grass
- The Grasscutter, a New Zealand Film
