= Mix Me a Person =

1962 British film by Leslie Norman

- Press campaign book cover
- Directed by: Leslie Norman
- Written by: Ian Dalrymple; Jack Trevor Story
- Produced by: Sergei Nolbandov; Victor Saville
- Starring: Donald Sinden; Anne Baxter; Adam Faith; Walter Brown; Carole Ann Ford; Antony Booth
- Cinematography: Ted Moore
- Edited by: Ernest Hosler
- Music by: Les Vandyke (aka John Worsley)
- Distributed by: British Lion Film Corporation
- Release date: August 1962
- Running time: 116 min.
- Country: United Kingdom
- Language: English

Mix Me a Person is a 1962 British crime drama film directed by Leslie Norman, starring Anne Baxter, Donald Sinden, Adam Faith, Walter Brown and Carole Ann Ford. It was written by Ian Dalrymple and Jack Trevor Story. A young London criminal is faced with being hanged for murdering a policeman. With even his defence counsel convinced of his guilt, a female psychiatrist tries to prove that the police and legal system have made a mistake.

== Plot ==
Phillip Bellamy, a leading barrister, tells his wife, psychiatrist Anne Dyson, about his most recent case defending a young man, Harry Jukes, who has apparently shot a policeman on a country road and been found by police still holding the gun. Bellamy is convinced of his guilt but Anne is less sure. Much of her practice is with troubled young people, and she feels there is more to the story than the police evidence.

Anne visits Harry in prison. He is depressed and distrustful but finally agrees to talk to her. Harry's story is that he took a Bentley Continental car to impress a girl, but when she went off with another boy, Harry decided to take the car for a spin before dumping it. Swerving to avoid another car, he burst a tyre, but could not find any tools in the boot to change the wheel. A policeman on a bicycle stopped to help. At the policeman's suggestion, Harry asked a couple in a car parked in the copse nearby for help, but disturbed at being caught in an illicit tryst, they refused and drove away. Harry next flagged down a lorry to ask to borrow a jack. The lorry stopped, but a passenger immediately produced a gun and shot the policeman. Harry managed to grab the gun from the killer as the lorry drove away. A few minutes later, a police car arrived and Harry was arrested.

Anne believes Harry's story and, having failed to persuade Bellamy of Harry's innocence, begins her own investigation, just as Harry is found guilty and sentenced to death by hanging. She visits Taplow, the owner of the stolen Bentley, and finds his account unconvincing. She also visits Harry's friends at their regular hangout, a café in Battersea, and they agree to help her. They give her items that support details of Harry's story, but this evidence is not accepted by the authorities. Two boys search for the couple in the parked car, while one boy, Dirty Neck, takes a job at Taplow's frozen food depot to do some investigating there. Taplow meanwhile is pressured by Terence, an IRA operative, to resume illegal gun dealing activities, although Taplow wants to wait until after Harry is hanged.

Harry's friends locate the courting couple, and they and Anne confront the couple in the park. The woman is ready to co-operate, but the man panics and in trying to get away crashes into a tree, killing himself and severely injuring his girlfriend, who then makes a useless statement. On the eve of Harry's execution, Dirty Neck informs Anne that something odd is happening at Taplow's warehouse. Anne goes there to investigate and is imprisoned by Terence in the cold store, but Taplow helps her escape, convincing the trigger-happy Terence not to shoot her. Anne calls the police who have actually been looking into the case again.

It transpires that an IRA outfit are planning to rob an arms lorry on its way between bases, with Taplow supplying a delivery lorry to carry the guns. A previous attempt had been aborted because of a policeman intervening and being shot dead, for which the innocent Harry was blamed and now stands convicted. The police intercept Taplow and Terence driving the lorry full of arms and both men are fatally shot, but Taplow manages to give police a deathbed statement clearing Harry. Harry is released from prison, and rejoins his mates at the cafe.

== Cast ==
- Anne Baxter as Doctor Anne Dyson
- Donald Sinden as Phillip Bellamy QC
- Adam Faith as Harry Jukes
- David Kernan as Socko
- Frank Jarvis as Nobby
- Peter Kriss as Dirty Neck
- Carole Ann Ford as Jenny
- Antony Booth as Gravy
- Topsy Jane as Mona
- Jack MacGowran as Terence, the IRA man
- Walter Brown as Max Taplow
- Glyn Houston as Sam
- Dilys Hamlett as Doris
- Meredith Edwards as Johnson
- Alfred Burke as Lumley
- Russell Napier as PC Jarrold
- Ed Devereaux as Superintendent Malley
- Ray Barrett as Inspector Wagstaffe
- Nigel Davenport as Jukes' stepfather

== Critical reception ==
The Monthly Film Bulletin wrote: "Basically the old race-against-time story, alternating visits to the condemned cell with sequences of amateur detection, Mix Me a Person has been done up contemporary – which roughly means that the nightclub of a few years ago has been replaced by guitars and espresso in Battersea. Director and scriptwriter, as so often happens, venture into this territory with only the most imprecise ideas of teenage talk. The unsettling effect extends to more familiar locales, and neither Donald Sinden, who gives an uncommonly irascible performance, nor Anne Baxter, saddled with lines of whose implausibility the actress seems all too well aware, can be called at ease. Connoisseurs may be divided between the charms of Dr. Dyson's visit to the Battersea café, or the teenagers' return call in Belgravia. Adam Faith likeably goes through the part of injured innocent; and the film tries – though how tentatively and ham-handedly – to show that it is with it by a night car ride, nouvelle vague style, and some 'realistic' police and prison detail."

Kine Weekly wrote: "Sociological stew containing more gristle than meat and clumsily flavoured by sex. ... Extravagant, nay, lurid ingredients are recklessly tossed into the melting pot, but defy both the cast and the director to cook up a satisfying, let alone wholesome, dish. And fancy giving Adam Faith an X certificate vehicle, thereby depriving the film of the patronage of his wide teenage public."

Disc wrote: "This is a serious film, or so it would have us believe. But the audience was in hysterics. It was without a doubt one of the funniest films I have seen for years. I enjoyed immensely, but not in the way I was intended to enjoy it. If this was meant to be the vehicle to carry Adam Faith into the class of the serious actor, then he must look again, and harder. He will have to exercise much more of his intelligence and his critical faculties before signing another picture contract."

Variety wrote: "Considering the all-round talent on hand, this one is a disappointment. Direction and thesping rarely rises above a flatfooted, cliche-ridden screenplay by Ian Dalrymple, with plenty dialog evoking undesired yock reaction. However, in their various ways, the three stars, Anne Baxter, Adam Faith and Donald Sinden, have names that could draw customers. "
