= Runaway Island (1982 film) =

- Directed by: Igor Auzins
- Starring: Miles Buchanan; Simone Buchanan; Hugh Keays-Byrne; Kate Fitzpatrick; Ron Haddrick
- Music by: Bob Young
- Country of origin: Australia
- Original language: English

Production
- Producer: Roger Mirams
- Cinematography: Ross Berryman
- Production company: The Grundy Organisation

Original release
- Network: Seven Network
- Release: 1982

Runaway Island is a 1982 Australian television film directed by Igor Auzins and starring Miles Buchanan, Simone Buchanan, Hugh Keays-Byrne, Kate Fitzpatrick, and Ron Haddrick. Set in the 1830s, it is about some wealthy children who form a gang with poor kids.

== Cast ==
- Miles Buchanan as Jamie McLeod
- Simone Buchanan as Jemma McLeod
- Beth Buchanan as Nancy
- Kate Fitzpatrick as Elene Costard
- Ric Hutton as Captain Corkle
- Ivar Kants as Hendrick
- Hugh Keays-Byrne as Lucas the Ratter
- Betty Lucas as The Hag
- Kerry McGuire as Molly McKenzie
- Drew Forsythe as Bloat
- Roger Ward as Pastor Braithwaite
- Michael Aitkens as Joe Dunn
- John Frawley as Rev. Symes
- Patrick Ward as Private Evans
- Alexander Archdale
- Michael Beecher
- Les Foxcroft
- Ron Haddrick
- Ray Meagher
