= Susanne Haworth =

Australian producer and actress

- Other names: Susanne Howarth; Susan Haworth; Sue Haworth
- Occupations: Producer, film and television actress
- Years active: 1964–67; 1976, 1980–99

Susanne Haworth is a retired Australian producer and film and television actress. She was a well-known child star during the 1960s, best known as Susan Wells in the children's adventure series Adventures of the Seaspray, but also had memorable guest appearances on Cop Shop, Prisoner Cell Block H and A Country Practice in her later career.

Haworth also became a successful television producer and was involved in the crime drama television series Phoenix, Secrets and Janus during the early-to mid 1990s and is the co-owner of Kuranya Pictures, a production company based in Bilgola, New South Wales, with Bill Hughes.

== Biography ==
Susanne Haworth made her acting debut in the 1964 television film A Season in Hell. She followed this with minor roles in a second television film, Rape of the Belt (1964), and a leading role in the musical comedy film Funny Things Happen Down Under (1965). From 1965–67, Haworth was a regular cast member in the children's adventure series Adventures of the Seaspray as Susan Wells. Haworth also made appearances on children's television series The Magic Boomerang and the crime drama Homicide during the mid-to late 1960s.

After the Adventures of the Seaspray ended, Haworth took a break from acting. She returned briefly in 1976 with guest appearances on the TV series of Alvin Purple and a one-season comedy series, Who Do You Think You Are? followed by a stint in Cop Shop in 1978. In 1980, she was cast in the cult soap opera Prisoner Cell Block H. She was initially introduced as a neighbour of Meg Jackson (Elspeth Ballantyne), the frustrated and overworked housewife Gail Summers, who is later sent to prison for child abuse. Following this, she made appearances on Holiday Island, Sons and Daughters, Taurus Rising and A Country Practice during the next two years.

In 1985, she was hired to design promos and recaps for the television miniseries A Fortunate Life. After her last acting role, Butterfly Island in 1987, she became interested in film production. In 1990, Haworth was the casting director and production assistant for the television film Jackaroo. She was also an assistant producer on the television series Phoenix, Secrets and Janus between 1992–95 and co-producer with Bill Hughes on the television film Fable in 1997.

In 2007, she co-wrote a children's book with Bob Randall entitled Stories from Country: My Pony Hooky and Other Tales. Many of these stories were partly based on traditional Aboriginal folk tales, as told by Bob Randall, from native tribes in The Red Centre and northern Australia.

== Filmography ==
=== Film ===
Year	Title	Role	Type
1965	Funny Things Happen Down Under	Teena (as Sue Haworth)	Feature film

=== Television ===
Year	Title	Role	Type
1964	A Season in Hell	Guest role: Isabelle (child)	ABC Teleplay
1964	A Sound of Trumpets	Daphne	Teleplay
1964	Rape of the Belt	Role unknown	TV film
1964;1967	Homicide	Guest role: Pam Reynolds / Prue Ellison (as Susan Haworth)	TV series, 2 episodes
1965	The Magic Boomerang	Recurring Guest role: Penny	TV series, 2 episodes
1966-1967	Adventures of the Seaspray	Regular role: Sue Wells / Susan Wilder	TV series, 33 episodes
1967	Australian Playhouse	Guest role	ABC TV series, 1 episode
1976	Who Do You Think You Are?	Guest role: Marcia	ABC TV series, 1 episode
1976	Alvin Purple	Guest role: Jeanie	ABC TV series, 1 episode
1978-1981	Cop Shop	Guest roles: Crystal Connors / Katrina Stamos / Sandra Carter	TV series, 17 episodes
1980	Prisoner	Recurring role: Gail Summers	TV series, 10 episodes
1981	Holiday Island	Guest role: Jane Daniels	TV series, 1 episode
1981	Homicide Squad aka The Squad	Policewoman Marcie Hayes	TV pilot
1982	Sons and Daughters	Recurring Guest role: Miss Brooks (as Susan Haworth)	TV series, 3 episodes
1982	A Country Practice	Guest roles: Gail / Susan Flett	TV series, 4 episodes
1982	Taurus Rising	Regular role: Jane Lindsay	TV series
1987	Butterfly Island	Regular role: Laura	TV series, 1 episode
1999	M.U.G.E.N	Voice	Video game
