= Barry Barclay =

New Zealand filmmaker (1944–2008)

- Born: 12 May 1944; Masterton, New Zealand
- Died: 19 February 2008 (aged 63)
- Occupation: Film director

Barry Ronald Barclay, MNZM (12 May 1944 – 19 February 2008) was a New Zealand filmmaker and writer of Māori (Ngāti Apa, Te Āti Haunui-a-Pāpārangi, Ngāti Hauiti) and Pākehā (European) descent.

== Background ==
Barclay was born in Masterton and raised on farms in the Wairarapa. He was educated at St Joseph's College, Masterton. He spent six years from the age of 15 in Redemptorist monasteries in Australia and carried out part of the training to be a Catholic priest in that order when he returned to New Zealand and embarked on a lengthy career in film, television and media. Later in life, he was based in Omapere, Hokianga, New Zealand before his death from a stroke at the age of 63.

== Films ==
His early radio career, then in film and television led to great recognition as a documentary maker in the 1970s and 1980s. His early experimental short documentaries Ashes, The Town That Lost a Miracle, and All That We Need led to an invitation to direct Tangata Whenua, a six-part television documentary series that presented the language, culture and politics of New Zealand's Maori people to a mainstream prime-time audience (in 1974) for the first time. The series was made in collaboration with producer John O'Shea of Pacific Films and historian and writer Michael King. Barclay wrote and directed The Neglected Miracle, a feature-length political documentary on the ownership of plant genetic resources. The project was shot over two years in eight countries.

After this success, Barclay left New Zealand for a time to live in Europe. He returned to make The Neglected Miracle, a documentary on the legal and societal challenges presented by assertions of ownership of genetic material, especially seed stocks, and an eponymous documentary on Indira Gandhi, then-Prime Minister of India. After these documentary projects, Barclay collaborated with screenwriter Tama Poata on the feature film, Ngati (1987), produced by John O'Shea. Ngati featured veteran Maori actor Wi Kuki Kaa in the lead role of 'Iwi.' The film was well received at several international film festivals, and attracted critical acclaim.

Barry's second feature film Te Rua (Pacific Films 1991), concerns an iwi's attempts to repatriate stolen carvings from a German museum back to their rightful place in Aotearoa. Te Rua was a German/New Zealand coproduction, and is acknowledged as a more complex and less successful film than Ngati. The issues raised in Te Rua – of 'ownership' versus 'guardianship' would form the basis of much of Barry's subsequent work.

From the 1990s on, Barclay completed The Feathers of Peace, a documentary about the peaceful response by the Moriori people to invasion of the Chatham Islands, as well as The Kaipara Affair, on the wide-ranging implications of dwindling fish populations and the effects from development in the Kaipara harbour.

His first book was Our Own Image (1990), about his film-making practices and the creation of Indigenous cinema. His second book, Mana Tuturu: Maori treasures and intellectual property rights (2005), makes proposals about Indigenous intellectual property rights. Barclay's book, Mana Tuturu, was listed in Books of Mana as one of the 180 most significant works of Māori-authored non-fiction.

== Recognition ==
In 2004, Barclay received an Arts Foundation of New Zealand Laureate Award.

In the 2007 Queen's Birthday Honours, Barclay was appointed a Member of the New Zealand Order of Merit, for services to film.

After his death, Barclay's body was returned to Whangaehu Marae near Whanganui on Wednesday, 20 February 2008. His tangi (funeral) was held on Saturday, 23 February 2008.

== Documentary on Barclay (2009) ==
A documentary on Barclay's life and work, Barry Barclay: The Camera on The Shore, (duration 102 minutes) directed by Graeme Tuckett and produced by Anne Keating, was completed in February 2009. It screened at international film festivals, and on Māori Television Service in 2009 and 2012.

== Filmography ==
As Director:

- The Kaipara Affair (2005)
- The Feathers of Peace (2000)
- Te Rua (1991)
- Ngati (1987)
- The Neglected Miracle (1985)
- Aku Mahi Whatu Maori (My Art of Maori Weaving) (1977)
- Ashes (1973)
- Autumn Fires (1975) TV
- Hunting Horns (1975) TV
- Indira Gandhi (1975) TV
- Tangata Whenua (1974) TV Series
- The Town That Lost a Miracle (1972) TV

As Writer:

- The Feathers of Peace (2000) (screenplay)
- Te Rua (1991)
- Aku Mahi Whatu Maori (My Art of Maori Weaving) (1977)

== Books ==
- Our Own Image (1990, Longman Paul, Auckland) ISBN 0-582-85832-1
- Mana Tuturu: Māori treasures and intellectual property rights (2005, Auckland University Press) ISBN 1-86940-350-9
