= The Death Train =

- Written by: Luis Bayonas
- Directed by: Igor Auzins
- Starring: Hugh Keays-Byrne; Max Meldrum
- Music by: Suzi Pointon
- Country of origin: Australia
- Original language: English

Production
- Producer: Robert Bruning
- Cinematography: Richard Wallace
- Editor: Ron Williams
- Running time: 96 minutes
- Production companies: Grundy Productions; Gemini Productions

Original release
- Release: 1 November 1978

The Death Train (alternately titled Death Train) is a 1978 Australian made-for-television horror thriller film directed by Igor Auzins, and starring Hugh Keays-Byrne and Max Meldrum.

It was produced by Robert Bruning's Gemini Productions.

== Plot ==
A dead man is discovered at the bottom of his garden. It appears he has been hit by a train even though no train has run along those tracks for years.

== Cast ==
- Hugh Keays-Byrne as Ted Morrow
- Ingrid Mason as Vera
- Max Meldrum as Johnny Loomis
- Ken Goodlet as Sergeant McMasters
- Brian Wenzel as Peter Murdoch
- Colin Taylor as Herbert Cook
- Terry Camilleri as Taxi Driver (uncredited)

== Production ==
The film was shot in Sydney. Shooting started September 1977.

== Reception ==
Don Groves of the Sydney Morning Herald said "Bruning has made some terrific thrillers, but this isn't one of them. After an intriguing opening, The Death Train simply runs off the rails... the script is given such tongue-in-cheek treatment, it's little more than a farce."

Charles Tatum from eFilmCritic rated the film a negative two out of five stars, criticizing the film's script, and editing.

Dave Sindelar from Fantastic Movie Musings and Ramblings gave the film a positive review, stating that the film's overall quirkiness (from its bizarre mystery, offbeat characters, and surreal humor) worked in its favor.
