= Runaway (1964 film) =

- Theatrical Poster
- Directed by: John O'Shea
- Written by: John Graham; John O'Shea
- Produced by: John O'Shea
- Starring: Colin Broadley; Nadja Regin
- Cinematography: Anthony Williams
- Music by: Robin Maconie
- Release date: November 1964
- Running time: 102 minutes
- Country: New Zealand
- Language: English

Runaway, also called Runaway Killer, is a 1964 New Zealand made thriller film and a road movie. John O’Shea of Pacific Films produced, directed and co-wrote it. Shot in black and white and released on 35 mm and also 16 mm, it was cut to 80 minutes and renamed Runaway Killer for release in Britain, although this lost continuity between scenes. The film stars Colin Broadley in the lead, and several New Zealanders who became famous in other fields; Kiri Te Kanawa, Barry Crump and Ray Columbus.

== Plot ==
High-flying but high-living accountant David Manning gets heavily into debt, loses his job and goes on the road. He is given a lift by the wealthy Laura, who fancies him and is jealous of Isobel, a young Maori woman they meet. After a fight he steals Laura's car and heads for the mountains of his childhood, meeting Diana on the inter-island ferry and pursued by police. They head up the glacier for a mountain pass. Diana falls, but Manning continues his hazardous journey up towards the pass.

== Cast ==
- Colin Broadley as David Manning
- Nadja Regin as Laura Kossovich
- Deidre McCarron as Diana
- Kiri Te Kanawa as Isobel Wharewera
- Selwyn Muru as Joe Wharewera
- Barry Crump as Clarrie
- Gil Cornwall as Tom Morton
- Sam Stevens as Tana
- Tanya Binning as Dorothy
- Doraine Green as Sandra
- Clyde Scott as Athol
- Rim D. Paul as Simon Rangi
- Alma Woods as Mrs Milligan
- William Johnstone as Alex Manning
- Murray Smith as Driscoll
- Mary Amoore as Helen Manning
- John Atha as Bellamy
- Kauri Toi as Mrs Wharewera
- Ray Columbus as Bandleader
