= The Long Arm (TV series) =

Australian television series

The Long Arm is an Australian television police series shown from April 1970, which ran for nineteen episodes.

== Synopsis ==
The series was produced in black-and-white by Ansett Television Films and made in-house by the Ten Network as part of an attempt to rival the popular police dramas produced for other commercial networks by Crawford Productions, such as Homicide and Division 4. The Long Arm was set in Melbourne, with segments shot in Sydney.

As a co-production between Channels 0 and Ten, it was able to marshal larger budgets and resources, allowing for original music and shooting fully on film rather than integrating videotape for interiors as was the Crawford practice at that time. The episodes were based on real-life cases (e.g. Ryan & Walker Christmas prison breakout), but it also attempted to introduce a soap opera appeal by examining the private lives of the detectives.

== Production history ==
The series was produced by Ron Beck and starred Robert Bruning, Sandy Harbutt, Lyndall Moor and Barbara Mason. Kenneth Goodlet and Tony Ward appeared in semi-regular roles. The series was criticised in the entertainment press for some excessively gory make-up on murder victims for its prime time slot. Six of the episodes were directed by Colin Eggleston.

Despite having top writers and guest actors, like Tony Morphett and Ron Randell, it failed to find an audience and media magnate Reg Ansett complained to his production crew about its lacklustre performance.

After it was abruptly cancelled, Sandy Harbutt adapted an episode he had written into his cult-favorite 1974 biker action film Stone. Noted Australian filmmaker Simon Wincer got his start as a second unit director on this series before being scooped up by Crawfords to work on the more successful show Matlock Police, which Ansett ordered as its replacement.

== Cast ==
=== Main ===
- Robert Bruning as Insp. Dallas Buchanan
- Sandy Harbutt as Det. Const. Kim Riverton
- Lyndall Moor as Trish Towns (credited in main titles as Lyndal)
- Barbara Mason as Veleen Towns

=== Recurring ===
- Kenneth Goodlet as Sergeant Ted Driscoll
- Tony Ward as Insp. Mike Hammond, N.S.W. Police

=== Guests ===
- Anne Charleston as Sybil Duckworth (1 episode)
- Barbara Stephens as Christine Martin / Miss Bream (2 episodes)
- Bill Hunter as Detective Sergeant Les Lee (1 episode)
- Brian Wenzel as Detective Sergeant Harrison (1 episode)
- Don Crosby as Harry Moss (1 episode)
- Gus Mercurio as Bud Weiser / Syd (2 episodes)
- Jeff Kevin as Tony (1 episode)
- John Ewart as Lenny (1 episode)
- Lesley Baker as The Nurse / Constable Brenda Davis (2 episodes)
- Marion Edward as Mollie Marker / Mrs Fleming (2 episodes)
- Maurie Fields as Gary Sutton (1 episode)
- Max Osbiston as Charlie Hall (1 episode)
- Michael Long as Nick (1 episode)
- Neva Carr Glyn as Ticket Seller (1 episode)
- Noeline Brown as Mrs Burton (1 episode)
- Owen Weingott as Dr Scarlo (1 episode)
- Patsy King as Naomi (1 episode)
- Redmond Phillips as Frank Tingley (1 episode)
- Ron Randell as Harvey Taunton-Neal (1 episode)
- Ron Shand as Zookeeper (1 episode) (as 'Ronie Shand')
- Ruth Cracknell as Mrs Stevens (1 episode)
- Serge Lazareff as Neville Martin (1 episode)
- Stewart Ginn as Wally Mills (1 episode)
- Terry Gill (1 episode)
- Tim Elliott as John Stevens
- Val Jellay as Landlady (1 episode)
- Vincent Gil as Bob Fitch (1 episode)
