= Hugh Keays-Byrne =

British-Australian actor (1947–2020)

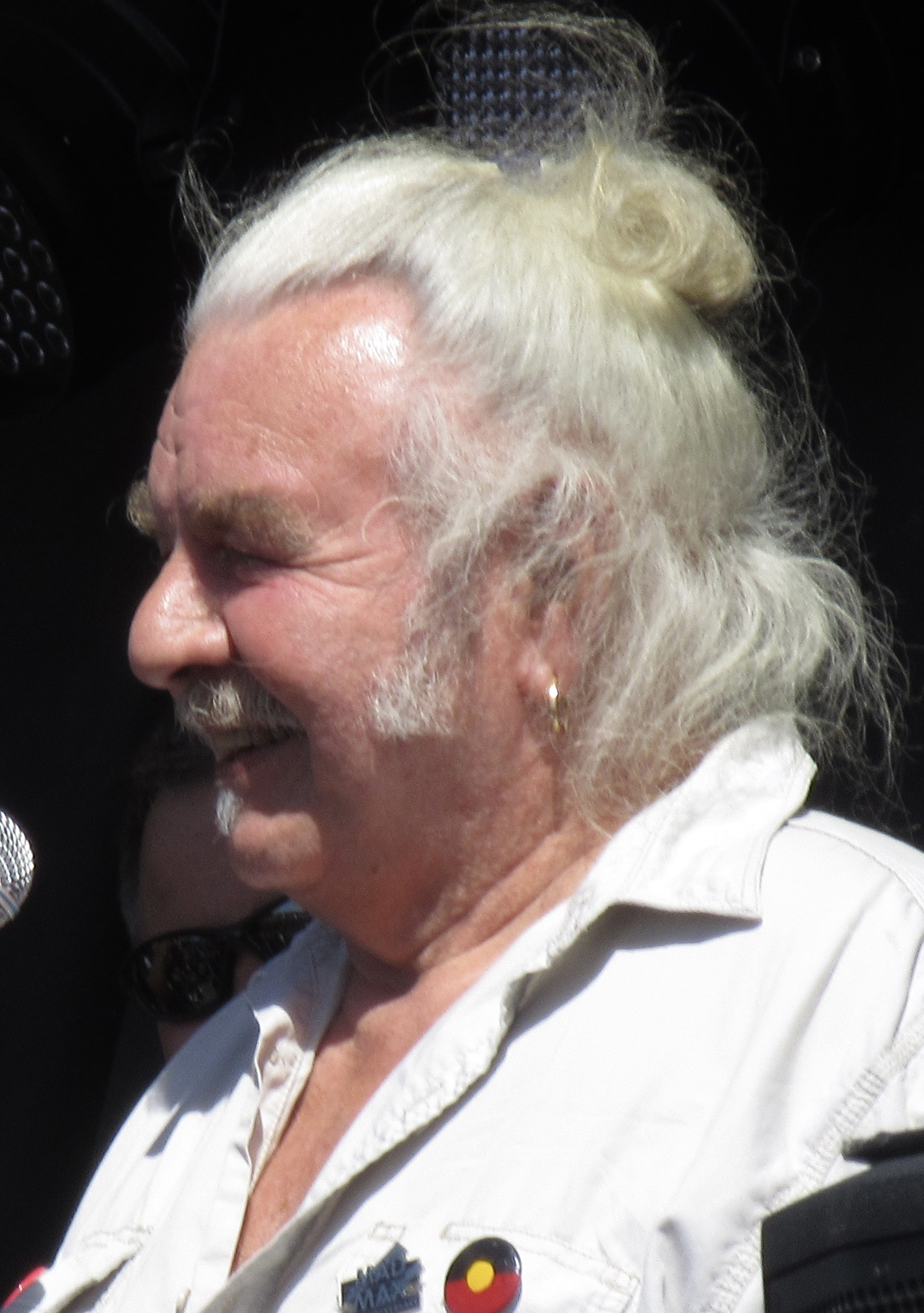
- Keays-Byrne in 2019
- Born: 18 May 1947; Srinagar, Jammu and Kashmir, British Raj
- Died: 2 December 2020 (aged 73); Gosford, New South Wales, Australia
- Citizenship: United Kingdom; Australia
- Occupations: Actor, film director
- Years active: 1967–2015
- Notable work: Toecutter in Mad Max; Immortan Joe in Mad Max: Fury Road

Hugh Keays-Byrne (18 May 1947 – 2 December 2020) was a British-Australian actor. He began his career on stage in his native England, where he was member of the Royal Shakespeare Company between 1968 and 1972. After emigrating to Australia in 1973, he established himself as a supporting actor in action and thriller films such as Stone and The Man from Hong Kong. His breakthrough film role was as the antagonist Toecutter in the original Mad Max. Decades later, he played another villain in the series, Immortan Joe in Mad Max: Fury Road.

Over the course of his career, Keays-Byrne was nominated for an AACTA Award and won a Logie Award for his performance in the television drama Rush. The 2024 prequel to Fury Road, Furiosa: A Mad Max Saga, is dedicated to his memory.

== Early life ==
Keays-Byrne was born in Srinagar, in the state of Jammu and Kashmir (part of the British Raj then, India now) to British parents; his family returned to Britain when India was partitioned. He was raised mainly in Surrey, and picked up an interest in acting after being spotted by a drama teacher at the comprehensive school he was attending. He got his first professional acting roles with a Theatre in Education troupe, and was mentored by Bernard Miles at the Mermaid Theatre in London.

== Career ==
Between 1968 and 1972, Keays-Byrne had parts in Royal Shakespeare Company productions including As You Like It, The Balcony, King Lear, Hamlet, Much Ado About Nothing, A Midsummer Night's Dream, The Tempest or The Enchanted Island, Doctor Faustus, The Man of Mode, Troilus and Cressida, Enemies, The Revenger's Tragedy, and Bartholomew Fair.

Keays-Byrne made his first television appearance in 1967 on the British television programme Boy Meets Girl. He was part of Peter Brook's production of A Midsummer Night's Dream with the Royal Shakespeare Company, which toured Australia in 1973. Keays-Byrne decided to remain in Australia after the tour ended. In 1974, he acted in the TV film Essington, then made his first film appearance in the motorcycle picture Stone. This was followed by supporting roles in films such as The Man from Hong Kong, Mad Dog Morgan, The Trespassers and Snapshot.

After his first starring role in the TV film Death Train, Keays-Byrne was cast as the violent gang leader Toecutter in Mad Max. Director George Miller had Keays-Byrne and the other actors for the gang traveled from Sydney to Melbourne in a group on motorcycles, as there was no money for airplane tickets. In an early international print of the film, Keays-Byrne was dubbed with a bad American accent, which Miller later regretted. Keays-Byrne then continued to act in post-apocalyptic and science fiction films such as The Chain Reaction, Strikebound, Starship and The Blood of Heroes.

In 1982, he directed the television film Madness of Two. In 1992, he made his feature directorial debut and acted in the film Resistance. He also appeared in TV miniseries adaptations of Moby Dick and Journey to the Center of the Earth.

Keays-Byrne played Grunchlk in the science fiction television series Farscape (1999–2003) and its conclusion Farscape: The Peacekeeper Wars. Miller also cast him as the Martian Manhunter in the planned 2009 film Justice League: Mortal.

Keays-Byrne returned to the Mad Max franchise in the 2015 film Mad Max: Fury Road as the main villain Immortan Joe. The film was nominated for ten Academy Awards, including Best Picture, winning six, and Keays-Byrne was nominated for the MTV Movie Award for Best Villain.

== Personal life ==
Keays-Byrne and his partner Christina were long-time residents of Lisarow. They were also part of the Macau Light Company, an artist collective based in Centennial Park. His hobbies included painting, poetry, and gardening.

== Death ==
Keays-Byrne died on 2 December 2020 at Gosford Hospital in NSW, at the age of 73. His death was announced by his friend, The Man from Hong Kong director Brian Trenchard-Smith.

The 2024 film Furiosa: A Mad Max Saga is dedicated to Keays-Byrne's memory.

Keays-Byrne’s funeral was held on 18 December 2020 at Palmdale Lawn Cemetery and Memorial Park in New South Wales, commencing at 12:30 pm in the Hillside Chapel. The private, non-religious service was attended by family, friends, and several recognisable figures from the entertainment industry. According to attendees, the atmosphere was celebratory, with many sharing fond memories and speaking warmly of his generosity, humour, and emotional depth. A montage of his on-screen roles was displayed on multiple screens throughout the chapel, reflecting his career and contributions to film.

== Filmography ==
=== Film ===
Year	Title	Role	Type
1974	Stone	Toad	
1975	The Man from Hong Kong	Morrie Grosse	
1976	Mad Dog Morgan	Simon	
1976	The Trespassers	Frank	
1978	Blue Fin	Stan	
1979	Mad Max	Toecutter	
1979	Snapshot	Linsey	
1980	The Chain Reaction	Eagle	
1982	Ginger Meggs	Captain Hook	
1983	Going Down	Bottom, the biker	
1984	Where the Green Ants Dream	Mining executive	
1984	Strikebound	Idris Williams	
1984	Lorca and the Outlaws	Danny	
1985	Burke & Wills	Ambrose Kyte	
1986	For Love Alone	Andrew Hawkins	
1986	Kangaroo	Kangaroo	
1987	Les Patterson Saves the World	Inspector Farouk	
1989	The Blood of Heroes	Lord Vlle	
1992	Resistance	Peter	
1999	Huntsman 5.1	Bain	
2011	Sleeping Beauty	Man 3	
2015	Mad Max: Fury Road	Immortan Joe	

=== Television ===
Year	Title	Role	Type
1967	Boy Meets Girl	Leslie	Episode: "A High-Pitched Buzz"
1967–1977	Bellbird		TV series
1974	Essington		TV film
1975	Ben Hall	John Piesley	4 episodes
1976	Polly Me Love		TV film
1976	The Outsiders	Doyle	Episode: "Ghost Town"
1976	Rush	Tim Thomas	Episode: "A Shilling a Day"
1977	Say You Want Me	Harry Kirby	TV film
1977	Death Train	Ted Morrow	TV film
1977	The Tichborne Affair	Tichborne	TV film
1977	Beyond Reasonable Doubt	Patterson	Episode: "Ronald Ryan Case"
1977	Chopper Squad	Syd Tasker	Episode: "Pilot"
1978	Barnaby and Me	Huggins	TV film
1980–1982	Secret Valley	William Whopper	6 episodes
1982	Runaway Island	Lucas the Ratter	TV film
1984	Five Mile Creek	Bill Curruthers	Episode: "Annie"
1987	Treasure Island	Voice	TV film
1990	Breaking Through		TV film
1988	Badlands 2005	Moondance	TV film
1988	Dadah Is Death	Hammed	TV film
1988	Joe Wilson	Bob Galletley	Episode: "No Regrets"
1995	Singapore Sling: Old Flames		TV film
1998	Moby Dick	Mr. Stubb	2 episodes
1999	Journey to the Center of the Earth	McNiff	2 episodes
2001	Farscape	Grunchlk	2 episodes
2004	Farscape: The Peacekeeper Wars	Grunchlk	TV miniseries

== Stage ==
Year	Title	Role	Type
1968	As You Like It	Unnamed parts	Royal Shakespeare Company
1968	King Lear	Unnamed parts	Royal Shakespeare Company
1968–1969	Much Ado About Nothing	Watch 3 / Unnamed parts	Aldwych Theatre & tour with Royal Shakespeare Company
1968–1969	Troilus and Cressida	Margarelon / Prologue (alt) / Unnamed parts	Aldwych Theatre & tour with Royal Shakespeare Company
1968–1970	Doctor Faustus	Sloth	Tour with Royal Shakespeare Company
1969	The Revenger's Tragedy	Spurio's Man	Aldwych Theatre with Royal Shakespeare Company
1969	Bartholomew Fair	Cupid (alt) / Puppy	Aldwych Theatre with Royal Shakespeare Company
1970	The Tempest or The Enchanted Island	Mariner / Master of a ship / Spirit	Royal Shakespeare Company
1970	Hamlet	Captain / Francisco / Player Mute	Royal Shakespeare Theatre with Royal Shakespeare Company
1970–1971	A Midsummer Night's Dream	Fairy / Cobweb	Royal Shakespeare Company
1971	Enemies	Yagodin	Aldwych Theatre with Royal Shakespeare Company
1971	The Balcony	Executioner	Aldwych Theatre & tour with Royal Shakespeare Company
1971	The Man of Mode	La Tour	Aldwych Theatre & tour with Royal Shakespeare Company
1973	A Midsummer Night's Dream	Snug	Australian national tour - Adelaide Festival Centre, Her Majesty's Theatre, Melbourne with Royal Shakespeare Company
1973–1974	The Marsh King's Daughter		Nimrod Theatre Company
1974	My Shadow and Me		Jane Street Theatre with NIDA & Australian Elizabethan Theatre Trust
1975	Of Mice and Men		Sydney Opera House & University of NSW with Old Tote Theatre Company
1976	A Streetcar Named Desire	Stanley Kowalski	Sydney Opera House with Old Tote Theatre Company
1977–1979	Treasure Island	Long John Silver	Rodd Island & Clark Island with Nimrod Theatre Company for Festival of Sydney
1978	Curse of the Starving Class	Weston	Nimrod Theatre Company with Nimrod Theatre Company
2009	Gethsemane		Belvoir Street Theatre

== Awards and nominations ==
Year	Award	Category	Subject	Result	Ref.
1977	Logie Award	Best Actor	Rush	Won	
1979	Australian Film Institute Award	Best Supporting Actor	Mad Max	Nominated	
2011	Alliance of Women Film Journalists	EDA Special Mention Award – Most Egregious Age Difference; Between the Leading Man and the Love Interest	Sleeping Beauty	Nominated	
2016	AFCA Award	Best Supporting Actor	Mad Max: Fury Road	Nominated	
2016	MTV Movie Award	Best Villain	Mad Max: Fury Road	Nominated	
