= Resistance (1992 film) =

- Directed by: Paul Elliott; Hugh Keays-Byrne
- Written by: Hugh Keays-Byrne; Christine Ferguson; Tim Burns; David Bracks; Brian Hannant; Paul Elliott (all writers is credited as The Macau Collective)
- Produced by: Christine Ferguson; Pauline Rosenberg; Jenny Day
- Starring: Lorna Lesley; Jennifer Claire
- Cinematography: Sally Bongers
- Edited by: Stewart Young
- Music by: Davood A. Tabrizi
- Production companies: Macau Light Film Corporation; Australian Film Finance Corporation; Wingar; Workers Power
- Release date: 1992
- Running time: 95 mins
- Country: Australia
- Language: English

Resistance is a 1992 Australian film set in the future in a military dictatorship.

== Plot ==
In a society on the brink of chaos, military forces are trying to ensure that farmworkers tend to the crops before they revolt, but one worker is shot dead by a soldier.

== Cast ==
- Lorna Lesley as Jean Skilling
- Jennifer Claire as Ruby
- Robert Noble as Jackal
- Gosia Dobrowolska as Mrs Wilson
- Vincent Gil as Bull
- Donal Gibson as Eric
- Hugh Keays-Byrne as Peter
- Tim Burns as Kyogle
- Jack Thompson as Mr. Wilson
- David Bracks as Mr Pickett
- Danny Adcock as James Dean
- Ben Gabriel as Quincy
- Arianthe Galani as Mother
- Harold Hopkins as Peach
- Kris McQuade as Ruth
