= Sandy Harbutt =

Australian film director (1941–2020)

- Born: 1941; Randwick, New South Wales, Australia
- Died: 21 November 2020 (aged 79); Wollongong, New South Wales, Australia
- Occupations: Actor, writer, director

Sandy Harbutt (1941 – 21 November 2020) was an Australian actor, writer and director, best known for the outlaw biker film, Stone (1974), starring his castmate Ken Shorter. Although it was very successful at the box office and became a cult classic, it was the only feature he ever directed. He was once married to actress Helen Morse.

== Early life and education ==
Harbutt was born in Randwick, New South Wales, and studied law before turning to advertising and then acting.

== Career ==
Harbutt worked extensively in theatre, particularly at Sydney's Ensemble Theatre. An early television appearance was with Shorter, as a pair of Bondi surfies who harass the Wells children in a 1967 color film episode of Adventures of the Seaspray. He had a regular role in the short lived 1970 Australian TV series The Long Arm.

After making Stone, he largely dropped out of screen acting, although he gave retrospective interviews for documentaries about the film and its place in the renaissance of Australian cinema.

== Death ==
Harbutt died 21 November 2020 at Wollongong Hospital, aged 79.

== Unmade projects ==
Harbutt only made one feature film. Among the projects he tried to make included:

- Strike about the Builders Labourers Federation
- a film adaptation of Drums of Mer by Ion Idriess
- The Reaper about a Nazi war criminal in Western Australia
- Action a look at the film industry through the eyes of a stuntman

In 2009 it was reported he was working on a bikie musical.

Producer David Hannay who worked with Harbutt on Stone said the most ’negative experience‘ he had as a filmmaker in a career of over three decades was failing to get finance for Harbutt to make another film:

Why have I failed? What is wrong with me? I have failed this person who is such an important part of my life, this person with enormous talent, this extraordinary human being, and I have failed him totally and absolutely. It really is the major low point in my life; if I really dwell on it, I get very angry.... I should have made a difference. Because I should have been able to make it happen. He is far more talented than 999 of the 1000 other people I know... You understand, of course, that he is his own producer. It is not a question of whether he would go to another producer. If he felt so inclined, he would. But, apart from anything else, Sandy needs somebody who is prepared to fold themselves into what he wants to do and be committed to that. That is something you would have to talk to him about.

== Filmography ==
=== Film ===
- The Runaway (1966)
- Color Me Dead (1969) as Chester
- Squeeze a Flower (1970) as Grape picker
- Crisis (1972)
- Stone (1974) as Undertaker

=== Television ===
- Skippy the Bush Kangaroo (1968, episode 48: Rockslide)
- The Long Arm (1970) as Det. Kim Riverton
