= Far East (film) =

- Directed by: John Duigan
- Written by: John Duigan
- Produced by: Richard Mason
- Starring: Bryan Brown; Helen Morse; John Bell
- Cinematography: Brian Probyn
- Edited by: Henry Dangar
- Music by: Sharon Calcraft
- Production company: Filmco
- Distributed by: Umbrella Entertainment; Village Roadshow
- Release date: 30 July 1982
- Running time: 102 minutes
- Country: Australia
- Language: English
- Budget: AU$1.3 million
- Box office: AU$1,972,000 (Australia)

Far East is a 1982 Australian drama film directed by John Duigan and starring Bryan Brown, Helen Morse and John Bell. Far East has many similarities to the 1942 classic Casablanca.

Filmink said it was "part of Australian cinema’s (brief as it turned out) interest in Asia in the early '80s".

== Plot ==
Journalist Peter Reeves (John Bell) takes his wife Jo (Helen Morse) to the Far East. There they meet Morgan Keefe (Bryan Brown), an expat Aussie who owns a sleazy bar/nightspot called "The Koala Klub". After renewing their romance, Jo seeks Morgan's help when her husband is persecuted by the military regime for his investigations.

== Cast ==
- Bryan Brown as Morgan Keefe
- Helen Morse as Jo Reeves
- John Bell as Peter Reeves
- Raina McKeon as Rosita Constanza
- Henry Duvall as Rodolfo De Cruz
- Sinan Leong as Nene
- Bill Hunter as Walker
- John Clayton as Tony Alsop
- Louise Pajo as Shirley
- Duc Sanh Lieu as Kip
- Anna Rowena as Julia

== Production ==
The original script was about an international business conference in the Philippines where members of the Philippines New Army surrounded them. However, the story would then drift to more of a Casablanca-type tale. Macao was used for eight days of location shooting.

== Awards ==
John Bell was nominated at the 1982 AFI Awards in the Best Actor in a Supporting Role category.

== Box office ==
Far East grossed $1,972,000 at the box office in Australia.

== Home media ==
Far East was released on DVD with a new print by Umbrella Entertainment in April 2012. The DVD is compatible with all region codes and includes special features such as the theatrical trailer and audio commentary with director John Duigan.

== See also ==
- Cinema of Australia
