= Funny Things Happen Down Under =

- Directed by: Joe McCormick
- Written by: John Sherman
- Produced by: Roger Mirams
- Starring: Olivia Newton-John; Bruce Barry; Ian Turpie; Susanne Haworth
- Cinematography: Roger Mirams
- Edited by: Lindsay Parker; Raymond Daley
- Music by: Horrie Dargie
- Production company: Pacific Films
- Distributed by: Pacific Films
- Release dates: August 1965 (New Zealand); 23 December 1966 (Australia)
- Running time: 90 mins
- Countries: Australia; New Zealand
- Language: English

Funny Things Happen Down Under is a 1965 Australian-New Zealand musical film directed by Joe McCormick. It stars Olivia Newton-John, Ian Turpie and Howard Morrison, and is best remembered today for being Newton-John's first film.

== Plot ==
The film centres around a barn that is used by a group of children as a meeting place for singing practice. When the owner of the property experiences financial difficulties and considers selling the barn, one of the children comes up with an idea to raise money. The children dye sheep on his property and market the coloured wool as a naturally occurring phenomenon.

The coloured wool soon becomes sought after by buyers all over the world. However, when it runs thin, the owner is still in danger of losing his barn. Two station hands, sympathetic to the plight of the children, decide to help by winning the remaining money in a sheep shearing contest.

== Cast ==
- Sue Haworth as Teena
- Ian Turpie as Lennie
- Bruce Barry as Frank
- Howard Morrison as Kingie
- Olivia Newton-John as Livvy
- William Hodge
- Kurt Beimel as Herr Kuhn
- Frank Rich as Mr. McIsaac
- John Gray
- The Terrible Ten (troupe of child actors)
- Frank Taylor as Policeman (uncredited)

== Production ==
The film was a spin-off of the Terrible Ten TV series. It was shot entirely in Victoria, on locations in and near Melbourne and in the studio of Pacific Films.

Olivia Newton-John and Ian Turpie were dating during filming.

== Reception ==
Erin Free from FilmInk magazine reviewed the film, saying: "It’s a cute, funny little flick, and Olivia Newton John’s wholesome but feisty persona gets its first solid workout in this characteristic effort from 1960s kids film and TV specialist Joe McCormick." She went on to say: "Funny Things is worth seeing, even if only for the campest dancing shearers in cinematic history."

A review in The Age read: "while nobody would claim Funny Things Happen Down Under as a children’s masterpiece, this little Australian color musical (screening from tomorrow at the Princess Theatre) makes generally delightful entertainment for them."

== See also ==
- Cinema of Australia
