= The Magic Boomerang =

Australian children's television series

- Genre: Children's television
- Created by: Roger Mirams
- Starring: David Morgan
- Country of origin: Australia
- Original language: English
- No. of seasons: 2
- No. of episodes: 45

Original release
- Network: ABC
- Release: 2 May 1965 – 1966

The Magic Boomerang is an Australian children's adventure series set in rural Australia. It was produced by Pacific Films and aired on the ABC in Australia.

== Synopsis ==
The show follows the adventures of a young boy who can stop time by throwing a magic boomerang.

== Cast ==
=== Main ===
==== Series 1 ====
- David Morgan as Tom Thumbleton
- Telford Jackson as Dan Thumbleton
- Penny Shelton as Gwen Thumbleton
- Rodney Pearlman as 'Wombat'

==== Series 2 ====
- Robert Brockman as Nugget Morris
- William Hodge as Charles Swinbourne
- Chris Christensen as Bluey
- Peter Aanensen as 'Tiger' Martin

=== Guests ===
- Fred Parslow
- Ian Turpie
- Kit Taylor
- Sheila Florance
- Simon Chilvers
- Susanne Haworth as Penny
- Terence Donovan

== International screenings ==
Episodes of The Magic Boomerang were also screened in Canada, United Kingdom, Italy Ireland and Zimbabwe.

== Remaining episodes ==
The National Film and Sound Archive holds 25 episodes, while the National Archives of Australia holds copies of all 45 episodes in their audio-visual collection.

== Episodes ==
=== Series 1 ===
No. overall	No. in series	Title	Original release date
1	1	"The Discovery"	2 May 1965
2	2	"Christmas Cracker"	9 May 1965
3	3	"A Visit From Grandma"	16 May 1965
4	4	"Wombat Finds A Friend"	23 May 1965
5	5	"The Hunter"	30 May 1965
6	6	"No Mail Today"	6 June 1965
7	7	"A Matter of Survival"	13 June 1965
8	8	"The Bushranger"	20 June 1965
9	9	"Ill Wind"	27 June 1965
10	10	"The Thief Who Believed in Magic"	5 July 1965
11	11	"Fire Trap"	12 July 1965
12	12	"The Hypnotist"	19 July 1965
13	13	"The Uncatchables"	26 July 1965
14	14	"North To Warralinga"	2 August 1965
15	15	"The Big Catch"	9 August 1965
16	16	"Moonlight Reef"	16 August 1965
17	17	"Aunt Matilda"	23 August 1965
18	18	"The Cattle Duffers"	30 August 1965
19	19	"The Saucer From Venus"	6 September 1965
20	20	"The Masked Man From Manangatang"	13 September 1965
21	21	"Moomba"	20 September 1965
22	22	"Gentleman Jackaroo"	27 September 1965
23	23	"Head of the River"	4 October 1965
24	24	"The Vanishing Spell"	11 October 1965
25	25	"The Stand-In"	18 October 1965
26	26	"Race Against Time"	25 October 1965
27	27	"The Auction"	1 November 1965
28	28	"A Lesson For Wombat"	8 November 1965
29	29	"Friend Or Foe"	15 November 1965
30	30	"The Good Turn"	Unknown (Note: This episode appears to have been skipped by the ABC due to a telecast of cricket)
31	31	"Pony Express"	29 November 1965
32	32	"The Last Lap"	6 December 1965
33	33	"Salt 'n' Pepper"	13 December 1965
34	34	"Mother's Day"	20 December 1965
35	35	"A Night at the Thumbleton's"	unknown
36	36	"My Friend Higgins"	unknown
37	37	"Stranger in Town"	unknown
38	38	"Mister Santa Claus"	17 January 1966
39	39	"The Messenger"	24 January 1966

=== Series 2 ===
No.	Title	Original release date	
40	1	"Bushranger's Gold"	unknown
41	2	"Buried Treasure"	unknown
42	3	"Luck of The Game"	13 June 1967
43	4	"Boys' Camp"	unknown
44	5	"Double Trouble"	unknown
45	6	"Hollermakers Bargain"	unknown

== See also ==
- List of Australian television series
- List of programs broadcast by ABC (Australian TV network)
