= Stone (1974 film) =

1974 Australian outlaw biker film

- Australian daybill film poster
- Directed by: Sandy Harbutt
- Screenplay by: Sandy Harbutt; Michael Robinson
- Produced by: Sandy Harbutt
- Starring: Ken Shorter; Helen Morse; Hugh Keays-Byrne; Sandy Harbutt; Vincent Gil
- Cinematography: Graham Lind
- Edited by: Ian Barry
- Music by: Billy Green
- Production company: Hedon Productions
- Distributed by: British Empire Films
- Release date: 28 June 1974
- Running time: 126 minutes (Theatrical); 99 minutes (Director's Cut)
- Country: Australia
- Language: English
- Budget: A$192,000
- Box office: $1.57 million

Stone is a 1974 Australian outlaw biker film written, directed and produced by Sandy Harbutt. It stars Ken Shorter and features Rebecca Gilling, Bill Hunter and Helen Morse. The film follows police officer Stone, who goes undercover with the outlaw motorcycle gang the Gravediggers to find out who is murdering their members one by one.

== Plot ==
When several members of the GraveDiggers outlaw motorcycle club are murdered, Sydney detective Stone (Ken Shorter) is sent to investigate. Led by the Undertaker (Sandy Harbutt), a Vietnam war veteran, the GraveDiggers allow Stone to pose as a gang member. Leaving behind society girlfriend Amanda (Helen Morse), Stone begins to identify with the Undertaker and his comrades Hooks (Roger Ward), Toad (Hugh Keays-Byrne), Dr Death (Vincent Gil), Captain Midnight (Bindi Williams), Septic (Dewey Hungerford) and Vanessa (Rebecca Gilling), the Undertaker’s girlfriend. Amid violent confrontations with the Black Hawks, a rival gang the GraveDiggers hold responsible, Stone uncovers a political conspiracy behind the killings. When the truth is revealed, Stone must choose between his job and his loyalty to the GraveDiggers.

== Cast ==
- Ken Shorter as Stone
- Sandy Harbutt as Undertaker
- Helen Morse as Amanda
- Hugh Keays-Byrne as Toad
- Vincent Gil as Dr. Death
- Bindi Williams as Captain Midnight
- James H. Bowles as Stinkfinger
- Rebecca Gilling as Vanessa
- Roger Ward as Hooks
- Lex Mitchell as Ballini
- Susan Lloyd as Tart
- Dewey Hungerford as Septic
- Slim de Grey as Inspector Hannigan
- Owen Weingott as Alder
- Michael Robinson as Pinball
- Ros Spiers as Whore
- Bill Hunter as Barman
- Billy Green as 69
- Deryck Barnes as Doctor Townes
- Harry Lawrence as Caretaker
- Garry McDonald as Mechanic
- Terry Bader as Hamburger
- Drew Forsythe as Fred
- Fred Scheiwiller as Ted
- Tony Allyn as Birdman
- Reg Evans as Solicitor
- Bruce McPherson as Go Down
- Jim Walsh as Bad Max
- John Ifkovitch as Zonk
- Rhod Walker as Chairman
- Ray Bennett as Sergeant Larson
- Neville Overall as Scrag
- Barry Butler as Buzzard
- Peter King as Ferret
- David Bracks as Boots
- Lachlan Jamieson as Hip
- Ros Talamini as Sunshine
- Victoria Anoux as Flossie
- Jane Gilling as Eurydice
- Margaret Ure as Jay
- Jude Matthews as Blue
- Eva Ifkovitch as Tiger
- Julie Edwards as Karma
- Karyn Love as Skunk
- Patrick Ward

== Production ==
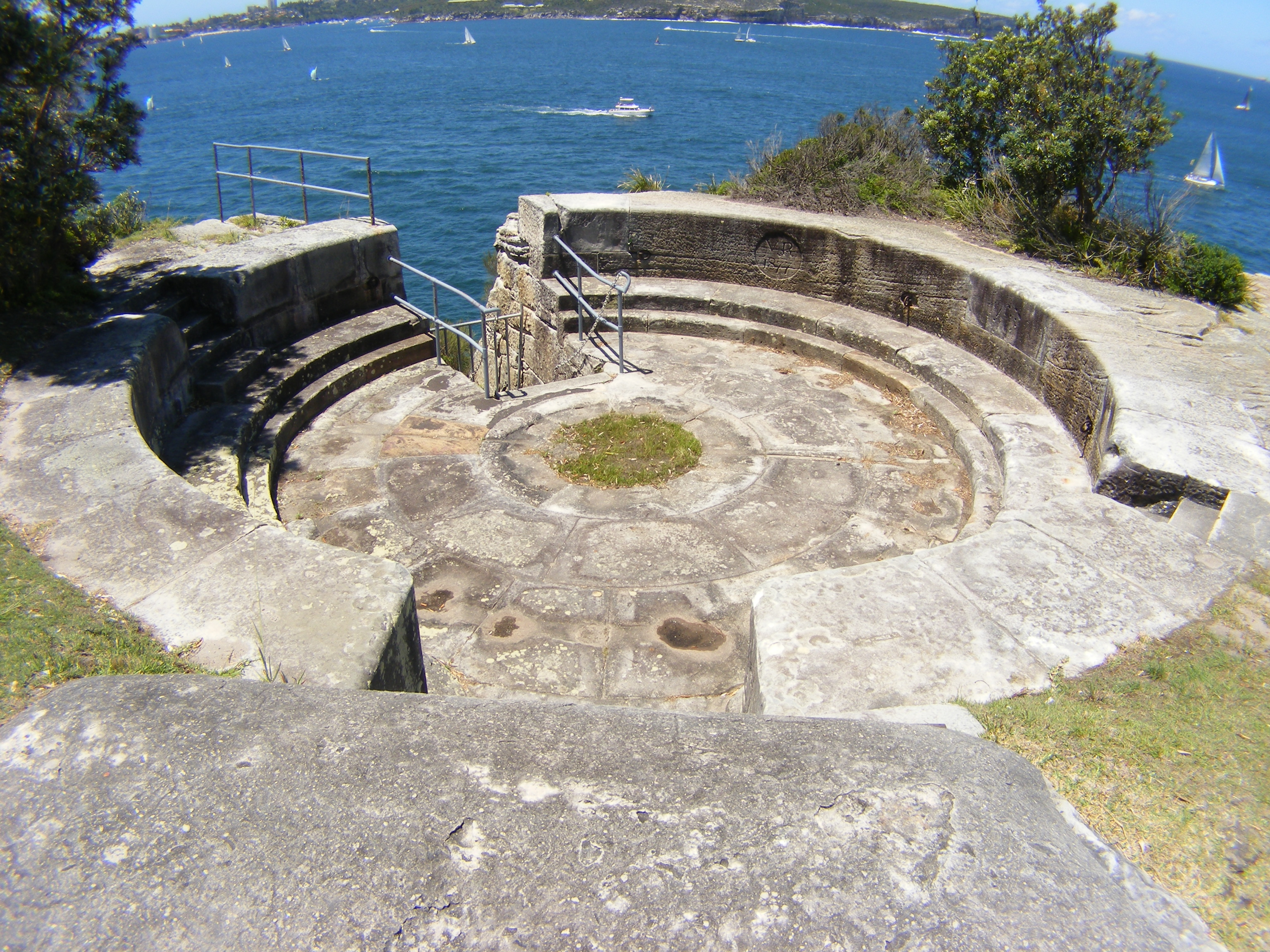
A gun emplacement at Middle Head on Sydney Harbour, used in one of the scenes in the movie. In the scene an under cover police officer (Stone) was initiated into the bikie gang

Sandy Harbutt got the idea in 1970 when he wrote a script for an episode of the TV police series The Long Arm in which he was appearing.

Filmink magazine said "The biker movie was the modern day Western of choice in the 1960s" but argued this was one of the few Australian films to "embrace it as a story option."

The Australian Film Development Corporation invested $154,000 in the film. The remainder of the budget and most of the technical facilities were provided by Ross Wood Productions in Sydney. The movie was shot in late 1973.

The Hells Angels club (Sydney) provided assistance during production.

== Release ==
Although Stone was given an "R" rating it grossed $1,572,000 at the box office in Australia, which is equivalent to $10,611,000 in 2009 dollars. It made a profit to its investors within 18 months.

== Charts ==
The soundtrack was released by Warner Bros. (600002)

Chart (1974)	Position
Australia (Kent Music Report)	89

=== Influence ===
Several of the cast went on to appear in Mad Max (1979), including Hugh Keays-Byrne, Roger Ward, Vincent Gil, David Bracks and Reg Evans.

== Stone Forever ==
Stone Forever
- Directed by: Richard Kuipers
- Produced by: Richard Kuipers
- Edited by: Andrea Lang
- Music by: Billy Green
- Production companies: Hedon Productions; Spectrum Films; SBS
- Distributed by: SBS
- Release date: 11 December 1999
- Running time: 63 minutes
- Country: Australia
- Language: English

Stone Forever is a 1999 documentary about Stone. Richard Kuipers was contacted by David Hannay and Sandy Harbutt to film a bike ride commemorating the film's 25th anniversary, which led to a full documentary about the impact of the film and the fate of the people who made it.
