= Locker Sixty-Nine =

1962 British film by Norman Harrison

- Theatrical release poster
- Directed by: Norman Harrison
- Written by: Richard Harris
- Based on: story by Edgar Wallace
- Produced by: Jack Greenwood
- Starring: Eddie Byrne; Paul Daneman; Walter Brown; Penelope Horner; Edward Underdown
- Cinematography: Bert Mason
- Edited by: Gordon Hales
- Music by: Bernard Ebbinghouse
- Production company: Merton Park Studios
- Distributed by: Anglo-Amalgamated Film Distributors (U.K.)
- Release date: 1962
- Running time: 56 minutes
- Country: United Kingdom
- Language: English

Locker Sixty-Nine (also known as Locker 69) is a 1962 British film directed by Norman Harrison and starring Eddie Byrne and Paul Daneman. It was written by Richard Harris based on a story by Edgar Wallace. It was an episode of the Edgar Wallace Mysteries series.

== Cast ==
- Eddie Byrne as Simon York
- Paul Daneman as Frank Griffiths
- Walter Brown as Craig
- Penelope Horner as Julie Denver
- Edward Underdown as Bennett Sanders
- Clarissa Stolz as Eva Terila
- John Carson as Miguel Terila
- John Glyn-Jones as Inspector Roon
- Edwin Richfield as Peters
- Alfred Burke as Davison
- Philip Latham as Dr. Trent
- Leonard Sachs as Spencer
- Larry Burns as doorkeeper
- Kenneth Thornett as constable (as Keneth Thornett)
- Norma Parnell as Maggie
- Valerie Van Ost as showgirl (uncredited)

== Critical reception ==
The Monthly Film Bulletin wrote: "The original story from which this script was taken is not one of Edgar Wallace's better known efforts, but it is a good example of the type of mystery writing at which he excelled, even if the 'gimmick' surprise is not, in fact, surprising. The plot depends stirely on the intricacies of its development, but all is smoothly done."

Kine Weekly wrote: "The entire cast thoroughly enters into the spirit of the extravagant malarky, and the director, too, sees that never a trick is missed ... The picture has both ingenuity and invention and contains all the tension and excitement of popular 'murder' mystery without producing the corpse. Eddie Byrne does an expert job as newshound Simon; Edward Underdown is a smooth Bennett: and Penelope Horner makes a glamorous and disarming Julie."
