= Adventures of the Seaspray =

Television series

- Genre: Adventure
- Starring: Walter Brown; Gary Gray; Susanne Haworth
- Composer: Eric Gross
- Country of origin: Australia
- Original language: English
- No. of episodes: 32 + 1 pilot

Production
- Producer: Roger Mirams
- Production companies: Pacific Films; Screen Gems

Original release
- Network: ABC Television
- Release: 27 March – 18 May 1967

Adventures of the Seaspray is a 1967 Australian adventure television series about a widower journalist who travels the Pacific with his children in a sailing boat. The series was broadcast in off-network syndication on American television in the late 1960s.

== Cast ==
=== Main / regular ===
- Walter Brown as Dan Wells, skipper of the 'Seaspray' (32 episodes)
- Gary Gray as Mike Wells, son (33 episodes)
- Susanne Haworth as Susan Wells, daughter
- Leone Lesinawai as Willyum (33 episodes)
- Rodney Pearlman as Noah Wells, son (9 episodes)

=== Guests ===
- Chips Rafferty (1 episode)
- Dennis Miller as Fred (1 episode)
- Ed Devereaux as Kippens (1 episode)
- John Gregg as Flying Officer Max Barker (1 episode)
- Ken Shorter as 2nd Youth (1 episode)
- Kit Taylor as Nathan (1 episode)
- Liza Goddard (1 episode)
- Lloyd Lamble as John Miller (1 episode)
- Lois Ramsey (1 episode)
- Mark Edwards (1 episode)
- Paul Stockman as Inspector Dales / Benjamin / Pirate (3 episodes)
- Sandy Harbutt as 1st Youth (1 episode)

== Background ==
Leone Lesinawai, who played Willyum in the series, was the owner of the Seaspray ship that was featured in the series. He leased the boat to the filming company and got the supporting part of Willyum. The Seaspray was located near Nadi (Fiji Islands) and was used for tourist cruises to neighbouring islands. According to South Sea Cruises (formerly Seaspray Cruises), the Seaspray is no longer active.
