= Pictures (film) =

1981 film

- Directed by: Michael Black
- Written by: Robert Lord; John O'Shea
- Starring: Kevin J. Wilson
- Cinematography: Rory O'Shea
- Release date: July 1981
- Running time: 87 minutes
- Country: New Zealand
- Language: English

Pictures is a 1981 New Zealand drama film directed by Michael Black. It was entered into the 12th Moscow International Film Festival.

== Cast ==
- Kevin J. Wilson as Alfred Burton
- Peter Vere-Jones as Walter Burton
- Helen Moulder as Lydia Burton
- Elizabeth Coulter as Helen Burton
- Terence Bayler as John Rochfort
- Matiu Mareikura as Ngatai
- Ron Lynn as President of the Geographical Society
- John Callen as Casey
- Ken Blackburn as James Gilchrist
