= Helen Morse =

Australian actress

- Born: 24 January 1947 (age 79); Harrow on the Hill, Middlesex, England
- Occupation: Actress
- Years active: 1965–present

Helen Morse (born 24 January 1947) is an English-born Australian actress who has appeared in films, on television and on stage. She won the AFI Award for Best Actress in a Leading Role for the 1976 film Caddie, and starred in the 1981 miniseries A Town Like Alice. Her other film appearances include Picnic at Hanging Rock (1975), Agatha (1979), Far East (1982) and The Eye of the Storm (2011).

== Early life and education ==
Morse was born in Harrow on the Hill, Middlesex, England, in 1947. She was the oldest of four children; her parents were a doctor and nurse. She moved to Australia in 1950 with her family. She attended school at Presbyterian Ladies' College in Burwood, Victoria, and graduated from the National Institute of Dramatic Art in 1965, and trained with Brian Syron in Sydney.

== Career ==
=== Film and television ===
Morse won the Australian Film Institute Award for Best Actress in a Leading Role for her performance in the 1976 film Caddie. Her notable screen performances also include roles in the film Picnic at Hanging Rock (1975) and the television miniseries A Town Like Alice.

Morse had roles on many television productions, including three episodes of The Doctor Blake Mysteries in 2014 (Series 2), 2015 (Series 3), and 2016 (Series 4).

=== Theatre ===
Since her early work with Jim Sharman in the 1960s and 70s – A Taste of Honey, Terror Australis, As You Like It, Morse has worked in over ninety theatre productions.

Morse has worked with many companies including Melbourne Theatre Company, Ensemble Theatre, The Independent, Nimrod Theatre Company, Marian Street Theatre, Sydney Theatre Company, Hunter Valley Theatre Company, Queensland Theatre Company, Harvest Theatre Company (South Australia) and the State Theatre Company of South Australia.

In 2002 and again in 2008, Morse played the role of Theodora Goodman in Adam Cook's adaptation of Patrick White's The Aunt's Story. Her 2004 performance as Nancy in Bryony Lavery's Frozen for the Melbourne Theatre Company earned her a Helpmann Award for Best Female Actor in a Play nomination. She has since been nominated for productions of John by Annie Baker (Melbourne Theatre Company), and Memorial by Alice Oswald (Brink Productions). In 2020, she won a Green Room Award for her performance in 33 Variations by Moisés Kaufman (Cameron Lukey and Neil Gooding Productions).

== Filmography ==
=== Film ===
Year	Title	Role	Type
1968	The Return of the Boomerang		Film short
1970	Adam's Woman	Maggie	Feature film
1974	Petersen	Jane / Charles' mistress	Feature film
1974	Stone	Amanda	Feature film
1975	Picnic at Hanging Rock	Mlle. de Poitiers	Feature film
1976	Caddie	Caddie Marsh	Feature film
1978	Tapak Dewata Java		Film short
1979	Agatha	Evelyn	Feature film
1979	The First Christmas	Voice	Film short
1982	Far East	Jo Reeves	Feature film
1984	Iris (aka Out of Time)	Iris / Sammie	Feature film
1997	The Bridge		Film short
2000	Lost	Mrs. Harris	Film short
2011	The Eye of the Storm	Lotte	Feature film
2015	Downriver	Mary	Feature film

=== Television ===
Year	Title	Role	Type
1966	Twelfth Night	Olivia	Teleplay
1966	The Runaway	Jenny	Teleplay
1966; 1967	Australian Playhouse	Beatrice / Patty Hutton	2 episodes: "No Dogs on Diamond Street" / "Sailor's Trousers"
1967	The Queen's Bishop		Teleplay
1967	You Can't See 'Round Corners	Karen	1 episode
1967	Contrabandits	Angela Carrol	1 episode
1967–1972	Homicide	Stella Lee / Joanne Edwards / Pamela Chandler	3 episodes
1968	The Great Barrier Reef	Narrator	Film documentary
1969	Love and War – Intersection		Teleplay
1969	Riptide	Joanna Decker	1 episode
1969–1974	Division 4	Mrs. Kirby / Angela Hughes / Penny Horton / Christine Marriott / Tina Findlay / Angela McGregor	6 episodes
1970	A Connecticut Yankee In King Arthur's Court	Voice	Animated TV movie
1970	Barrier Reef	Joan Norris	1 episode
1971	The Legend of Robin Hood	Voice	Animated TV movie
1971	Spyforce	Joan / Nurse	2 episodes: "The Escape"
1972	The Spoiler		1 episode
1972	Travels of Marco Polo	Princess Cocacin (voice)	Animated TV movie
1972	Crisis	Margie	TV pilot
1972	The Resistible Rise of Arturo Ui	Dockdaisy	Teleplay
1972	Matlock Police	Susan Williams	1 episode
1972	Quartet		Episode: "The Last Great Journey"
1972	The Kenneth Connor Show	Various characters	4 episodes
1973; 1974	Ryan	Shirley Green / Goldie Taylor	2 episodes
1974	Things that Go Bump in the Night	Kalie Ingham	1 episode
1974	Marion	Marion Richards	Miniseries, 4 episodes
1974	This Love Affair		Episode 11: "A Family Christmas"
1974	A Touch of Reverence		Miniseries
1975	Ivanhoe	Voice	Animated TV movie
1976	Luke's Kingdom	Kate	Miniseries, 13 episodes
1976	Power Without Glory		Miniseries
1976	Obsession – Kill Kaplan!		Teleplay
1979	The Sullivans	Dr Jessica Barrett	
1981	A Town Like Alice	Jean Paget	Miniseries, 3 episodes
1982	Logie Awards of 1982	Herself	TV special
1982	Silent Reach	Antonia Russell	Miniseries, 2 episodes
1983	Australian Movies to the World	Herself	TV special
1985	Sherlock Holmes and the Baskerville Curse	Beryl Stapleton (voice)	Animated TV movie
1985	The Adventures of Robin Hood	Maid Marion (voice)	Animated TV movie
1992	Bony		1 episode
1993	Review	Guest presenter	1 episode
1997	Night of the Bogongs	Narrator	Documentary
1999	Stone Forever	Herself	TV special
2000	Pozières	Herself	TV movie documentary
2002	Caddie on Location	Herself	Film documentary
2003	Love Letters from a War	Narrator	TV movie
2008	The Prime Minister is Missing	Narrator	TV documentary
2010	City Homicide	Penelope McVeigh	1 episode
2010	Mary McKillop: Soul of the Sunburnt Country	Mary McKillop (voice)	Video documentary
2012	The Mystery of a Hansom Cab	Mother Guttersnipe	TV movie
2014	Picnic at Hanging Rock: Everything Begins and Ends	Herself	Film documentary
2014, 2016	The Doctor Blake Mysteries	Agnes Clasby	3 episodes
2016	Molly	Grandmother	Miniseries, 2 episodes
2016	Barracuda	Margot Taylor	Miniseries, 2 episodes

== Theatre ==
=== As actor ===
Year	Title	Role	Venue / Company
1964	Extracts from Shakespeare	Celia in As You Like it and Jaquenetta in Love's Labour's Lost	UNSW
1964	Our Town	Mrs Gibbs	UNSW Old Tote Theatre, Sydney
1964	Two Programs of One Act Plays: Love and How to Cure It	Linda	UNSW Old Tote Theatre, Sydney
1964	Two Programs of Short Plays: The Chinese Wall / Hamlet	Mee Lan the Chinese princess / Ophelia	UNSW Old Tote Theatre, Sydney
1965	Uncle Ben	Hetty	UNSW
1965	A Series of Dance Pieces: Ballad of the Drover's Wife	Dance group	UNSW
1965	Othello		UNSW Old Tote Theatre, Sydney
1965	Down in the Valley / Leonard Teale & Andy Sundstrom	Jenny Parsons	UNSW Old Tote Theatre, Sydney
1965	The Plough and the Stars	Bessie Burgess	UNSW Old Tote Theatre, Sydney
1965	A Taste of Honey		Cell Block Theatre, Sydney
1965	The Business of Good Government		Assembly Hall, Sydney
1967	The Imaginary Invalid		UNSW Old Tote Theatre, Sydney
1967	A Lily In Little India		Independent Theatre, Sydney
1967	The School for Scandal		UNSW Old Tote Theatre, Sydney
1968	Terror Australis		Jane St Theatre, Sydney
1968	Private Lives		Hunter Theatre, The Junction, Palace Theatre, Sydney
1968	Present Laughter		Hunter Theatre, The Junction, Palace Theatre, Sydney
1969	Pygmalion		UNSW Parade Theatre, Sydney, Canberra Theatre Centre
1969	The Merchant of Venice		UNSW Parade Theatre, Sydney
1970	The Seagull		Scott Theatre, Adelaide
1970	What the Butler Saw		Phillip St Theatre, Sydney
1971	As You Like It	Celia	UNSW Parade Theatre, Sydney
1971	The Man of Mode		UNSW Parade Theatre, Sydney
1971	The Resistible Rise of Arturo Ui		UNSW Parade Theatre, Sydney, Canberra Theatre
1971	The Dutch Courtesan		UNSW Parade Theatre, Sydney
1971	The National Health or Nurse Norton's Affair		UNSW Parade Theatre, Sydney
1971	Lasseter		UNSW Parade Theatre, Sydney
1971	The Resistible Rise of Arturo Ui		UNSW Parade Theatre, Sydney
1972	Rooted		Nimrod Theatre, Sydney
1972–1973	Tom		Russell St Theatre, Sydney
1976	The Wolf	Vilma	UNSW Parade Theatre, Sydney
1977	The Time Is Not Yet Ripe	Doris	Sydney Opera House
1978	A Visit with the Family	Kit	Nimrod Theatre, Sydney
1979	Rain	Sadie Thompson	Ensemble Theatre, Sydney
1979	Not I	Mouth	Nimrod Theatre, Sydney
1979	Vicki Madison Clocks Out	Vicki Madison	Nimrod Theatre, Sydney
1980	Cyrano de Bergerac	Roxanne	Sydney Opera House
1982	Duet for One	Stephanie Abrahams	His Majesty's Theatre, Perth, Playhouse Adelaide, Marian St Theatre, Sydney, Newcastle Civic Theatre, Playhouse Canberra, Theatre Royal, Hobart, Melbourne Athenaeum, Theatre Royal Sydney
1985	Private Lives		Playhouse, Newcastle
1985	Blithe Spirit		Playhouse, Newcastle
1985	Pride and Prejudice		Queensland tour
1986	A Happy and Holy Occasion	Brenda	Playhouse, Newcastle
1986–1987	A Streetcar Named Desire	Blanche DuBois	His Majesty's Theatre, Perth, Playhouse, Melbourne, Her Majesty's Theatre Sydney
1987	Away		Shanghai
1987	Twelfth Night		Playhouse, Melbourne
1987	The Rivers of China	Katherine Mansfield	Wharf Theatre, Sydney, Playhouse Melbourne
1988	Europe by Michael Gow	Barbara	Australian national tour
1988	Hedda Gabler	Hedda	Playhouse, Melbourne
1989	The Cherry Orchard	Carlotta	Playhouse, Melbourne
1989–1990	The Recruiting Officer		Playhouse, Melbourne
1989–1990	Our Country's Good	Lizzie Morden	Playhouse, Melbourne, Playhouse Adelaide
1989–1990	Mrs Klein		Russell St Theatre, Melbourne, Marian St Theatre, Sydney
1990	The Tempest	Ariel	Playhouse, Melbourne
1990	Nothing Sacred		Playhouse, Melbourne
1990	Away	Coral	Malthouse Theatre, Melbourne
1991	The Crucible	Elizabeth Proctor	Playhouse, Melbourne
1991	The Marriage of Figaro		Playhouse, Melbourne
1991	On Our Selection		Playhouse, Melbourne
1992	A Midsummer Night's Dream		Playhouse, Adelaide
1992	'Tis Pity She's a Whore		Playhouse, Adelaide
1992–1993	Death and the Maiden		Wharf Theatre, Sydney, Russell St Theatre, Melbourne, Playhouse Perth, Space Theatre, Adelaide, Sydney Opera House with STC
1993	Under Milk Wood		Playhouse, Adelaide
1994	The Tin Soldier and The Paper Bag Princess	Narrator	Lyric Theatre, Brisbane
1995	Arcadia	Hannah	Playhouse, Melbourne, Playhouse Adelaide, Sydney Opera House, Theatre Royal, Hobart, Canberra Theatre, His Majesty's Theatre, Perth
1995–1996	Good Works by Nick Enright		Malthouse Theatre, Space Theatre, Adelaide, Wharf Theatre, Sydney
1997	A Little Night Music		Playhouse, Melbourne, Princess Theatre Melbourne, Theatre Royal Sydney
1998	The Woman in the Window by Alma De Groen		Fairfax Studio, Melbourne
2000	Keene / Taylor Theatre Project		Sydney Opera House
2001	The Twilight Series	Ensemble	Collins Street Baptist Church
2001	Kaddish		Span Gallery, Melbourne with Keene/Taylor Theatre Projects
2001–2002	The Aunt's Story	Theodora Goodman	Playhouse, Melbourne, Belvoir St Theatre, Sydney, Playhouse, Brisbane
2003–2004	Frozen	Nancy	Fairfax Studio, Melbourne, Wharf Theatre, Sydney with STC / MTC; Nominated for a Helpmann Award for Best Female Actor in a Play
2004	Hats Off! to Sondheim		National Theatre, Melbourne
2005	The Breath of Life		Glen Street Theatre, Tuggeranong Arts Centre, Jetty Memorial Theatre, Coffs Harbour, Ipswich Civic Hall, Sunshine Coast Events Centre, Queensland University of Technology, Dunstan Playhouse
2005	Ivanov		fortyfivedownstairs, Melbourne
2007	Beckett Poetry and Prose		Parade Theatre, Sydney
2007	Homer's Iliad		The Stork Hotel, Melbourne
2007	The Odyssey		The Stork Hotel, Melbourne
2007	Beyond Cuisine		fortyfivedownstairs, Melbourne
2008	Architektin		Dunstan Playhouse, Adelaide
2008	The Aunt's Story	Theodora Goodman	
2009	The Year of Magical Thinking	Joan Didion	The New Dolphin Theatre, Crawley, Albany Town Hall Theatre, Perth
2010	Duets for Lovers and Dreamers		fortyfivedownstairs, Melbourne
2011	Sundowner		Phee Broadway Theatre, Castlemaine
2012	Signs of Life		Western Australia tour & Sydney Opera House
2012	The Curtain		Southbank Theatre, Melbourne
2013	Sundowner		Australian national tour
2013	Brel	Singer	Space Theatre, Adelaide
2014	Once in Royal David's City		Belvoir Theatre, Sydney
2016	Wit		fortyfivedownstairs, Melbourne
2017	John by Annie Baker	Mertis Katherine Graven	Fairfax Studio, Melbourne with Melbourne Theatre Company; Nominated for a Helpmann Award for Best Female Actor in a Play
2017	Angels in America		fortyfivedownstairs, Melbourne
2018	Memorial by Alice Oswald		Dunstan Playhouse, Adelaide, Playhouse, Brisbane, Barbican Centre, London with Brink Productions; Nominated for a Helpmann Award for Best Female Actor in a Play
2019	33 Variations	Dr Ladenburger	Comedy Theatre, Melbourne; Won a Green Room Award
2020	Escaped Alone		Belvoir St, Sydney
2022	Escaped Alone & What If If Only	Mrs Jarrett / Fs	Southbank Theatre, Melbourne
	The Funniest Man in the World		Keene/Taylor Theatre Projects

=== As director ===
Year	Title	Role	Venue / Company
2000	National Playwrights Conference 2000 - The Workshop Program	Director	State Theatre Company Rehearsal Room, Adelaide, Scott Theatre, Adelaide

== Personal life ==
Morse was married from 1967 until 1976 to Australian actor and director Sandy Harbutt, who she met while starring in a stage production of A Taste of Honey in Newcastle. They also starred together in Stone.
