= One Bright Day (film) =

- Based on: play by Sigmund Miller
- Written by: Alan Seymour
- Directed by: Raymond Menmuir
- Country of origin: Australia
- Original language: English

Production
- Running time: 75 mins
- Production company: ABC

Original release
- Network: ABC
- Release: 7 October 1959
- Release: 30 December 1959 (Melbourne, taped)

One Bright Day is a 1958 Australian television play. It aired on the ABC and was directed by Ray Menmuir. It aired as part of Monday Night Theatre.

It was based on a US TV play by American Sidmund Miller. Alan Seymour adapted it.

== Plot ==
Julian Prescott is the president of a large chemical company. His business is almost ruined by his ambitious general manager, George Lawrence, who in the president's absence has changed the formula of a popular patent medicine produced by the company. The president is faced with a lawsuit by a man who claims the new formula drug caused the death of his son. The president's daughter Margot becomes involved.

== Cast ==
- Patricia Kerr as Margot Prescott
- Joe McCormick as Julian Prescott
- Kevin Sanders as George Lawrence, general manager
- Eric Gormley as Fred Newberry, an executive
- Julian Flett as a lawyer
- Georgie Sterling
- Nigel Lovell
- Eve Hardwick
- Carlotta Kalmar
- Laurier Lange
- John Llewellyn
- Al Thomas

== Production ==
The original play had been performed on stage in Melbourne in 1957.

It was the first TV play for many of the cast.

== Reception ==
The TV critic for the Sydney Morning Herald thought that "neither the writing nor the acting... allowed deep or gripping investigation of the play ' s essential issue whether it is better to be callous and stay rich, or to be decent and plunge down to poverty.... For the most part, the characters were being run by the plot, instead of themselves begetting the plot—which is mere yarn-spinning, and not drama."

== See also ==
- List of live television plays broadcast on Australian Broadcasting Corporation (1950s)
