= Judy McIntosh =

New Zealand actress

- Born: New Zealand
- Died: 2 December 2024 (aged 64)
- Occupation: Actress
- Notable work: Arriving Tuesday, Ngati

Judy McIntosh was a New Zealand actress. She won the 1987 GOFTA Award for Best Performance, Female, in a Leading Role - Film for Arriving Tuesday, the 1988 Listener Film and Television Award for Best Supporting Actress for Ngati and the 1995 New Zealand Film and Television Award for Best Supporting Actress for Marlin Bay.

McIntosh played the lead role of Monica in Arriving Tuesday. She starred in Ngati as Jenny, G.P. as Dr Nikki Tanner and The Grasscutter as Hanah Carpenter and she hosted Weekend on TVNZ.

Other screen roles include playing Constable Lois Higgs in Mortimer's Patch, Jessica Dunbar-Jones in Gloss, the Pevensie children's mother in The Chronicles of Narnia: The Lion, the Witch and the Wardrobe, Leslie's mother in Bridge to Terabithia, appearing in Ebbtide and the "Lust" episode of Seven Deadly Sins
