= Ebbtide =

1994 Australian thriller film

- Directed by: Craig Lahiff
- Written by: Bob Ellis; Peter Goldsworthy; Warwick Hind
- Produced by: Craig Lahiff; Paul Davies; Helen Leake
- Starring: Harry Hamlin; Judy McIntosh; John Waters
- Production company: Genesis Films
- Release date: 1994
- Running time: 94 minutes
- Country: Australia
- Language: English
- Budget: $2.6 million

Ebbtide is a 1994 Australian direct-to-video film.

== Cast ==
- Harry Hamlin as Jeff Warren
- Judy McIntosh as Ellen Fielding
- John Waters as Michael Suresch
- Lisa Hensley as Beth
- Frankie J. Holden as Ernie
- Susan Lyons as Alison
- John Gregg as Chalmers
- Kate Raison as Ann Blackmore
- Gerard Kennedy as Fredericks
- Nicki Paull as Katherine McGuire
- Edwin Hodgeman as Doctor
- Olivia Hamnett as Committal Judge
- Vince Martin as Jimmy Pollard

== Plot ==
Lawyer Jeff Warren takes over a compensation case after the sudden death of one of his partners.

== Production ==
Screenwriter Bob Ellis later claimed the original script "was a really terrific Chandleresque film noir that bears no resemblance to the eventual film." He asked to be credited as "Robert Ellis".

Author Peter Goldsworthy co-wrote the script.

Director Craig Lahiff:

Bob did a script and it was very difficult to raise money for it. It was more of a personal film. It had a particular style to it which might have been better if Bob had shot and directed. But in the end, because I'd spent a lot of money and time on it, we tried to give it a different approach and got another writer, Peter Goldsworthy.

The film was co-financed by the American Broadcasting Company. Lahiff:

They had a fair bit of script involvement and also casting, so I ended up with Harry Hamlin as lead. He wasn't my choice of actor, and while he was very good to get on with, it changed the feel of the film, whereas I would probably have done it in quite a different style and cast other people differently as well. It was just a matter of completing the film and doing the best I could and trying a few stylistic things.
