= The Morning After (The Avengers) =

- The Avengers episode
- Episode no.: Season 6 Episode 18
- Directed by: John Hough
- Written by: Brian Clemens (teleplay)
- Original air dates: 10 January 1969 (ATV, UK); 27 January 1969 (ABC, US); 29 January 1969 (Thames, UK)

Guest appearances
- Peter Barkworth; Joss Ackland; Brian Blessed

Episode chronology
← Previous "Killer"	Next → "The Curious Case of the Countless Clues"

"The Morning After" is the eighteenth episode of the sixth series of the 1960s cult British spy-fi television series The Avengers, starring Patrick Macnee and Linda Thorson. Its first broadcast was in the ATV region of the ITV network on Friday 10 January 1969. Thames Television, who commissioned this series of the show for ITV, broadcast it in its own region 19 days later on Wednesday 29 January. The episode was directed by John Hough, and written by Brian Clemens.

== Plot ==
Having cornered conman Jimmy Merlin in a suburban office, Steed and Tara prepare to take him in. However they fall victim to sleeping gas bombs Merlin had recently stolen - as does Merlin himself, who is unable to get away in time. When Steed and Merlin awake, they are baffled to find the town completely deserted. Leaving Tara to sleep it off, Steed - with the reluctant Merlin in tow - discovers a plot to hold the whole country to ransom.

== Cast ==
- Patrick Macnee as John Steed
- Linda Thorson as Tara King
- Peter Barkworth as Jimmy Merlin
- Joss Ackland as Brigadier Hansing
- Brian Blessed as Sergeant Hearn
- Penelope Horner as Jenny Firston
- Donald Douglas as Major Parsons
- Philip Dunbar as Yates
- Jonathan Scott as Cartney
- Nosher Powell as Ministry Guard

== Production ==
The towns of St. Albans, Watford and Old Hatfield were used as to represent the unnamed town in "The Morning After", the locations in which remain virtually unchanged since filming, with the exception of Old Hatfield's central area.
