= Penelope Horner =

British actress (born 1939)

- Born: 20 June 1939 (age 86); London, United Kingdom
- Occupation: Actress

Penelope "Penny" Horner (born 20 June 1939) is a British former film and television actress.

== Life and career ==
Penelope Horner began her acting career in 1956 in the British film comedy A Touch of the Sun. Other small roles followed in films such as A King in New York and The Nun's Story. In 1961, she played Anne Rider in the Edgar Wallace film The Daffodil Mystery as well as Julie Denver in Locker Sixty-Nine in 1962. During the 1960s and 1970s she became a regular face in some of the popular spy adventure series of the day, including The Saint, The Avengers and The Persuaders!. She starred alongside Jack Palance in the 1974 television adaptation of Dracula directed by Dan Curtis.

In the 1980s, Horner appeared as Sarah Hallam in the second and third season of the BBC soap opera Triangle. She retired in 1986.

Penelope married 2 times :

- David Korda (1962 - 1973)
- Rex Berry (1981 - ?)

== Partial filmography ==
=== Feature films ===
- 1959: The Treasure of San Teresa
- 1960: The Angry Silence
- 1961: The Devil's Daffodil
- 1961: The Horsemasters
- 1967: Half a Sixpence
- 1970: The Man Who Had Power Over Women
- 1977: Holocaust 2000
- 1984: Escape from El Diablo

=== Television ===
- 1961: Alcoa Presents: One Step Beyond (Episode: The Face)
- 1961: Boyd Q.C. (Episode: The Runabout)
- 1962: Edgar Wallace Mysteries - Locker Sixty-Nine
- 1964: Gideon's Way (Episode: The Big Fix)
- 1964: Detective (Series 2 Ep 13 The Golden Dart)
- 1965-1966: The Saint (3 episodes)
- 1969: The Avengers (Episode: The Morning After)
- 1971: The Persuaders! (Episode: Someone Waiting)
- 1974: Dracula
- 1974: Father Brown (Episode: The Quick One)
- 1975: Thriller (Episode: The Double Kill)
- 1976: Star Maidens (Episode: Escape to Paradise)
- 1982-1983: Triangle (52 episodes)
- 1986: Hell's Bells (6 episodes)
