= Igor Auzins =

Australian filmmaker

Igor Auzins (born 1949 in Melbourne) is an Australian filmmaker. He joined Crawford Productions in 1969, worked as a cameraman, and then a director. He made documentaries for the South Australian Film Corporation, TV commercials, tele movies and features.

== Select Credits ==
- Matlock Police (TV series) - camera operator
- Division 4 (1972-73) (TV series) - director
- Upstream, Downstream (1975) (short film)
- Homicide (1973–76) - won a Logie for his direction of episode "The Firework Man"
- The Outsiders (1976) - director Ghost Town
- The Big Backyard (1977) (short film) - director
- Upstream downstream (1977) (short) - director
- All at Sea (1977) (TV movie)
- Death Train (1977) (TV movie) - director
- The Night Nurse (1977) (TV movie) - director
- High Rolling (1977) - director
- Chopper Squad (1978) (TV series) - director
- Bailey's Bird (1979) (TV series) - director
- Water Under the Bridge (1980) (miniseries) - director
- A Country Practice (TV series) - director
- Runaway Island (1982) - director
- We of the Never Never (1982) - director
- Taurus Rising (1982) (Tv series) - director
- The Coolangatta Gold (1984) - director
