= Secret Valley =

Television series

- Created by: Terry Bourke; Roger Mirams
- Starring: Hugh Keays-Byrne; Max Cullen; Sheila Kennelly; Simone Buchanan; Miles Buchanan; Beth Buchanan; Kelly Dingwall; Marianne Howard; Alfred Bell; Rodney Bell; Marcia Britos
- Opening theme: "My Secret Valley" by Bob Young (music) and Roger Mirams (lyrics)
- Countries of origin: Australia; France; Spain
- No. of episodes: 26

Production
- Executive producer: Roger Mirams
- Running time: 30 minutes
- Production companies: Grundy Organisation; Telecip, S.A.; Televisión Española

Original release
- Network: ABC
- Release: 1980
- Network: TVE 2
- Release: 10 May – 1 November 1982

Secret Valley is a children's television adventure series created by Terry Bourke and Roger Mirams. It was produced by the Grundy Organisation from Australia in association with Telecip from France and Televisión Española (TVE) from Spain. It was first aired in 1980 on the ABC in Australia, and in 1982 on TVE 2 in Spain. It spawned a spin-off series in 1986 titled Professor Poopsnagle's Steam Zeppelin.

== Series synopsis ==
Secret Valley is a fictitious children's holiday camp in Bildarra which has been transformed from a run-down ghost town into a resort. The children who work and visit the camp often find themselves in battle against a gang of bad kids – Spider McGlurk and his gang from "Spider Cave". These battles usually feature flour bombs and other food-related missiles and everyone inevitably ends up in a big mess.

Spider McGlurk and his gang are not the biggest threat to the peace at Secret Valley. Secret Valley is also under threat of closure by the local council, and property developer William Whopper (also known as 'WW') played by Hugh Keays-Byrne.

It was produced by Roger Mirams who also produced the spin-off series Professor Poopsnagle's Steam Zeppelin in 1986, amongst other programs and series.

The 1980 pilot was directed by Howard Rubie and written by Terry Bourke. It was filmed in late 1979 with a budget of $100,000.

== Cast ==
- Hugh Keays-Byrne as William Whopper (WW)
- Max Cullen as Claude Cribbins
- Sheila Kennelly as Cecilia Cribbins
- Simone Buchanan as Simone
- Miles Buchanan as Miles
- Beth Buchanan as Beth
- Marianne Howard as Marianne
- Michael McGlinchey as Mike
- Kelly Dingwall as Spider McGlurk
- Tom Farley as Dan McCormack
- Marcia Britos as Rosa
- Rodney Bell as Snake
- Mark Spain as Beaver
- Brett Jankowiak as Piet
- David Manning as Lofty

== International screenings ==
The series was aired in New Zealand, Greece, Italy, the UK on ITV in the 1980s, and the Netherlands in 1982/1983 by KRO television. It was also broadcast by the Dutch TV station Kindernet in 1989/1990. It was also aired in South Africa in 1983 on the state-owned SABC and translated in Quebecois French for the state-owned francophone branch of the CBC.

== Production ==
The series was a co-production between the Grundy Organisation from Australia, Telecip from France, and Televisión Española from Spain. Some of the child actors in this show were real-life siblings – Beth, Miles and Simone Buchanan. The series was at Smokey Dawson's ranch in the Sydney suburb of Terrey Hills and also at the theme park El Caballo Blanco.

Roger Mirams originally intended to make a series called The Ghost Town Gang at Smoky Dawson's ranch at Ingleside, which had been used to film Luke's Kingdom and Lost Islands. However bushfires went through it, and there was no ghost town so the show became Secret Valley. Thirteen days after the fire, filming started again. Producer Mirams says the overall theme of Secret Valley is depicted through kids doing their own thing in what usually is an adult world.

== The theme song ==
The theme song "My Secret Valley" was sung to the tune of "Waltzing Matilda" and composed by Bob Young, with lyrics by series producer Roger Mirams (credited as David Phillips).

I had a dream I could ride across the mountaintops

Ride on the waves where the sea turns blue

Gum trees, some trees rise until they touch the sky

I know a place where it all comes true

Chorus:

I know a valley, I know a valley

My Secret Valley the world has to see

One place for children, welcome from around the world

Please come and share Secret Valley with me

Verse

Paris, London, Montreal and Amsterdam

So many friends that we want to know

From the hills of Spain to the city streets of Germany

I know a place where we all can go

Repeat chorus

== Episodes ==
1. Big plans
2. Secret weapon
3. Battle stations
4. The horse who could dance
5. The junkman
6. The ghost of Secret Valley
7. Save the bunyip
8. The monster
9. The marvelous magnetising machine
10. The runaway
11. Double trouble
12. The great mini bike race
13. Spanish gold
14. I spy
15. Secret Valley Bush Fire
16. Super scoop
17. Spider McGlurk Meets His Match
18. The Trojan Bull
19. A sticky situation
20. The worm turns
21. Lost in the bush
22. The pony express
23. The Bildara Bank Bust
24. The oily bird catches the worm
25. The secret valley goes to town
26. End of the rainbow
