= Roger Mirams =

New Zealand producer, director and cinematographer

- Born: Roger Eastgate Holden Mirams; 16 April 1918; Christchurch, New Zealand
- Died: 26 February 2004 (aged 85); Sydney, New South Wales, Australia
- Years active: 1931–2002
- Spouse: Irene
- Awards: Australian Film Institute Award Nomination Best Children's Television Drama Escape of the Artful Dodger 2002

Roger Eastgate Holden Mirams (16 April 1918 – 26 February 2004) was a New Zealand-born film producer and director, whose career extended over 60 years. Mirams co-directed and photographed Broken Barrier, the only local dramatic feature film made in New Zealand in the 1950s, and later won a reputation for the children's television series he produced in Australia.

== Biography ==
Mirams was born in the New Zealand city of Christchurch, New Zealand where he made his first film aged 13, When the Gangsters Came to Christchurch. It screened at a local cinema in 1931.

Mirams joined the New Zealand Army at the outbreak of World War II, working as a war correspondent and cameraman throughout the duration of the war, which saw him travel with the New Zealand Division throughout Italy and the Middle East. Following the end of the war, he travelled to Japan where he filmed a documentary about the war crimes trials that were held there. He then joined the New Zealand National Film Unit as a director and cameraman and later became the Movietone News representative for New Zealand.

In 1948 in New Zealand he formed Pacific Films with former ex-National Film Unit staffer Alun Falconer. With John O'Shea (director), who would later become a partner in the company, he co-directed relationship drama Broken Barrier – the first fictional feature film to be produced in New Zealand since 1940.

In 1956 Mirams founded an Australian branch of Pacific Films. He was involved in film production in Australia with James Stewart and fellow New Zealander Jim Davies. In 1966 he founded a new production company, Roger Mirams Productions. In 1977 he joined the Grundy Organisation.

Mirams had moved to Australia in 1956 to work on coverage of the 1956 Melbourne Olympic Games. He intended to work in any capacity that he could, but was lucky to secure exclusive film rights. As official Olympic cameraman, much of the filming of the games was his work. He decided to settle in Australia following the Olympics, and spent much of the rest of his career working in Sydney.

The first production by Pacific Films in Australia was a WWII docudrama telling the story of the men who worked as Coastwatchers during World War II. This is sometimes given as one of his inspirations for his later success, Spyforce. He then began to work on a series of children's television shows such as The Terrific Adventures of the Terrible Ten (1959), The Magic Boomerang (1965) and Funny Things Happen Down Under (1965) starring a young Olivia Newton-John. In 1966 Roger Mirams Productions created the successful effort Adventures of the Seaspray (1967), followed by Woobinda, Animal Doctor (1969).

After several years working on children's productions, Mirams decided to return to a more adult genre, and one he knew personally. Taking inspiration from his earlier work The Coastwatchers (1959), he began work on a WWII espionage drama with the working title Spycatchers. Paramount Pictures liked the idea, and offered to fund the project. In 1971, he began working on Spyforce with Ron McLean, and the series was a hit. A second series was produced in 1972.

Mirams returned to the children's genre of which he was so well acquainted with shows such as The Lost Islands (1976) and Secret Valley (1980), the latter of which was a big hit in Australia. In 1986, he produced a spin-off series from Secret Valley, entitled Professor Poopsnagle's Steam Zeppelin, which was successful in Australia and also in parts of Europe – most notably the United Kingdom, where it was shown three times between 1987 and 1998. He continued to make quality children's television into the 21st century, and fulfilled a lifelong dream to do a remake of Oliver Twist, when he made The Fate of the Artful Dodger in 2002. It was his last work before he died in 2004.

== Personal life ==
Mirams married Gwen Naylor in 1941; they had two daughters, and a son who died in a motorbike accident in 1990. He married Irene in 1986. He was the brother of New Zealand Chief Film Censor, Gordon Mirams.

Although he was a pioneer in Australasian TV projects, especially on location color films, which were successful internationally, Mirams was largely unrecognized by the industry during his lifetime, rarely being nominated for awards.

== Filmography ==
- When the Gangsters Came to Christchurch (1931)
- Broken Barrier (1952) with John O'Shea
- The Coastwatchers (1959)
- The Terrific Adventures of the Terrible Ten (1960)
- The Ten Again (1963)
- Funny Things Happen Down Under (1965)
- The Magic Boomerang (1965)
- Adventures of the Seaspray (1967)
- Woobinda, Animal Doctor (1969)
- Spyforce (1971–72)
- Silent Number (1973)
- The Lost Islands (1976)
- The Spiral Bureau (1976)
- Secret Valley (1980)
- The Squad (1981)
- Runaway Island (1982)
- Professor Poopsnagle and His Flying Zeppelin (1989)
- South Pacific Adventures (1990)
- Search for Treasure Island (1998)
- Escape of the Artful Dodger (2001)
- The Fate of the Artful Dodger (2002)

== References and notes ==
- Obituary in Dominion Post (Wellington) of 4 March 2004 (page B7)
