= Broken Barrier =

1952 New Zealand film

- Directed by: John O'Shea; Roger Mirams
- Written by: John O'Shea
- Produced by: John O'Shea; Roger Mirams
- Starring: Kay Ngarimu; Terence Bayler
- Narrated by: Guy Smith
- Cinematography: Bill Hopper
- Production company: Pacific Films
- Distributed by: NZ Film Archives
- Release date: 10 July 1952
- Running time: 69 minutes
- Country: New Zealand
- Language: English

Broken Barrier is a 1952 New Zealand film. It was directed and produced by John O'Shea (director) and Roger Mirams, and written by O'Shea. It starred Kay Ngarimu and Terence Bayler, and also featured Myra Hapi Smith, Bill Merito and George Ormond.

The film addresses mistrust and prejudice between Pākehā and Māori in New Zealand, portraying a romance between a Pākehā man and a Māori woman.

== Cast ==
- Kay Ngarimu as Rawi
- Terence Bayler as Tom Sullivan
- Myra Hapi as Kiri
- George Ormond as Alec
- Dorothy Tansley as Mrs. Sullivan
- F.W. French as Mr. Sullivan
- Lily Te Nahu as Maata
- Bill Merito as Johnny
- Carol Chapman
- Lloyd Morgan

== Plot ==
The film is about the relationship between Tom Sullivan, a Pākehā journalist, and Rawi, a Māori woman. Sullivan meets Rawi while researching articles on rural Māori life, and he stays for a time with Rawi's family. Rawi's family disapproves of her relationship with a Pākehā man, ending in a quarrel. Later, however, the two are re-united in the city, where Rawi goes to work as a nurse. The two resume their romance, but this time meet with opposition from Sullivan's family and friends, who do not wish him to be involved with a Māori woman. Sullivan eventually comes to agree with their views, and the couple separate once again. Sullivan has a change of heart, however, when he is saved from a fire by a Māori friend's sacrifice. Sullivan and Rawi are reunited.

== Production ==
The film was the first real attempt at a feature film to be produced in New Zealand since the end of World War II and was filmed on a shoestring budget, and as such was fairly rudimentary and naive, yet was also important at re-establishing the New Zealand film industry.
