= The Adventures of the Terrible Ten =

- Also known as: Ten Town; Terrific Adventures of the Terrible Ten
- Genre: Children's television
- Country of origin: Australia
- Original language: English
- No. of episodes: 52

Production
- Producer: Roger Mirams
- Running time: 10 minutes
- Production company: Pacific Films

Original release
- Network: GTV-9
- Release: 1959 – 1960

Related
- Funny Things Happen Down Under

The Terrific Adventures of the Terrible Ten, more commonly known as The Adventures of the Terrible Ten, was an Australian children's TV show originally titled Ten Town that ran from 1959 to 1960. The series was filmed in rural Victoria. Fifty-two 10-minute episodes were created for the original series. The original episodes were re-edited and, along with new footage, were released in 1962 as The Ten Again. The series was originally screened on GTV-9 but all repeats were aired by the Australian Broadcasting Corporation (ABC). It was also shown in the UK.

As the series developed, a gang of rival kids was introduced, at first led by a boy named Rex Jackson, then by "Spider" McGurk, and last by "Freckles" O'Foot. Sometimes adopting the title "El Supremo", O'Foot was an almost comic character and inspired loyalty in his followers.

In 1965 a colour feature film adaptation of the series entitled Funny Things Happen Down Under was released; it was the film debut of Olivia Newton-John.

== Episodes ==
Known Episodes
No. overall	No. in season	Title	Directed by	Written by	Original release date
1	1	"Terrible Ten Build a town."	?	?	1960
2	2	"Ten Town Fire Brigade"	?	?	1960
?	?	"Terrible Ten Help The Police"	?	John Sherman	1960
?	?	"The Great Submarine Mystery"	?	Jeffery Underhill	1960
?	?	"A horse named Joe (Part 1)"	Joe McCormick	?	1960
?	?	"A horse named Joe (Part 2)"	Joe McCormick	?	1960
