= The Grasscutter =

- Directed by: Ian Mune
- Written by: Roy Mitchell
- Produced by: Tom Finlayson
- Starring: Terence Cooper; Martin Maguire; Ian McElhinney
- Music by: Don McGlashan; Wayne Laird
- Production company: Central Independent Television
- Release date: 1988
- Running time: 102 minutes
- Country: New Zealand
- Language: English

The Grasscutter is a 1988 film directed by Ian Mune and written by Roy Mitchell. It stars Ian McElhinney as Brian Deeds with Frances Barber as his wife and Judy McIntosh as his mistress.

== Cast ==
- Ian McElhinney as Brian Deeds
- Marshall Napier as Det. Inspector Cross
- Judy McIntosh as Hanah Carpenter
- Martin Maguire as Billy
- Mitchell Manuel as Patu Beale
- Terence Cooper as Jack Macready
- Frances Barber as Claire Deeds
- Temuera Morrison as Det. Sergeant Harris

== Synopsis ==
A landscape architect (McElhinney) living in New Zealand finds that his past catches up with him. Ulster Volunteer Force (UVF) loyalists from Northern Ireland have discovered the new identity he was given after becoming a "supergrass" and come after him, drastically increasing New Zealand's violent crime rate in the process.

== Production ==
The film was a co-production between UK based Central Independent Television and an Auckland consortium headed by Tom Finalyson. It was shot in the south of New Zealand, in Dunedin and Queenstown.

== Reception ==
Helen Martin in New Zealand film, 1912-1996 wrote "The set-up is novel — this is the first New Zealand-set film to dramatise the Irish 'troubles' — but apart from the landscaper / informer double entendre there's not much new in this standard action thriller."

In the Sydney Morning Herald Alison Stewart gave it 2 1/2 stars and wrote "There's a wee bit of predictability to this film but, still, it's a reasonable night's viewing."

Colleen Reilly from Dominion Sunday Times said "An interesting one for New Zealand viewers was the constant attention brought to the differences between Northern Ireland and New Zealand"
