= Walter Brown (actor) =

New Zealand actor (1927–2013)

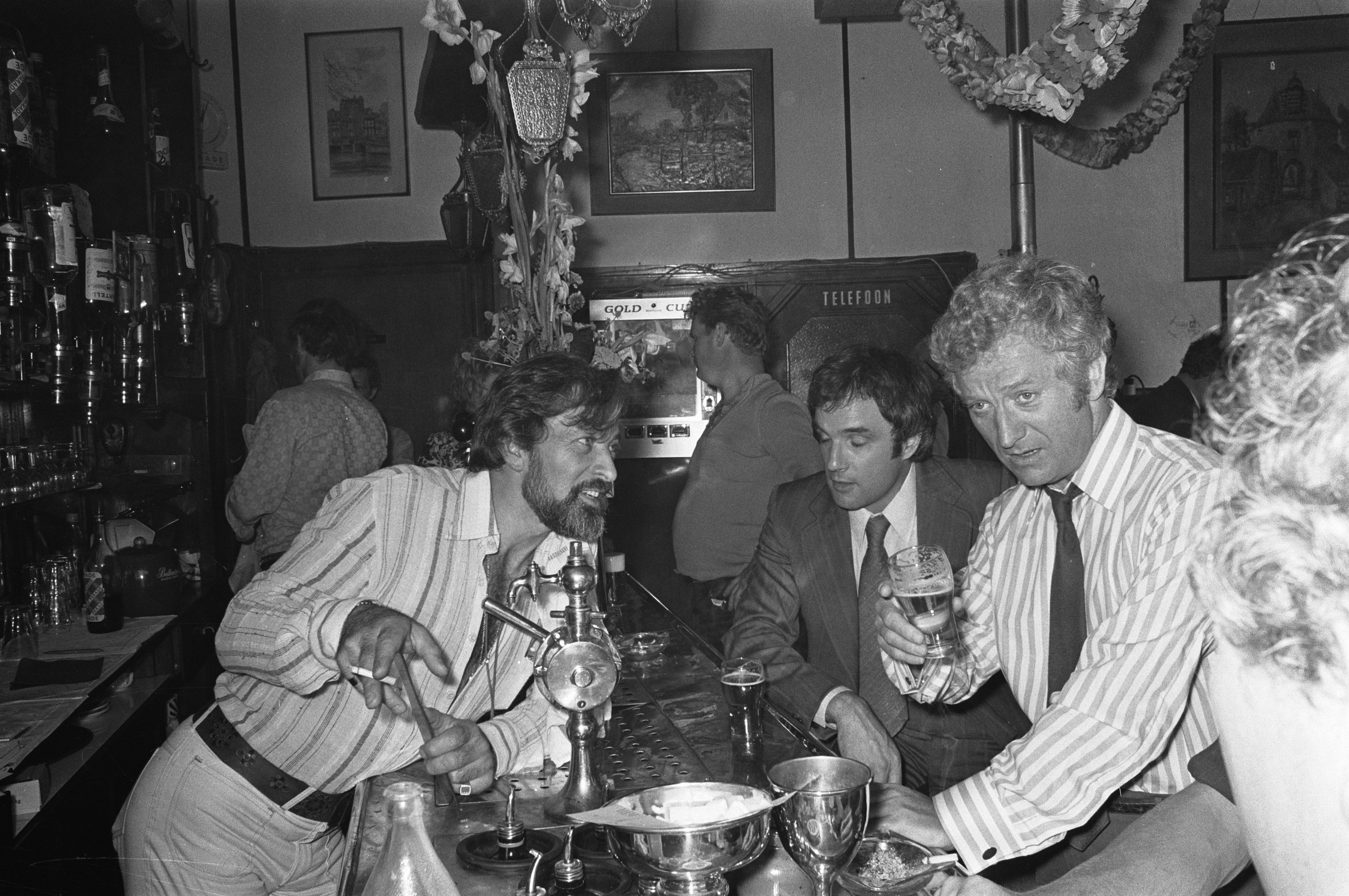
- Left to right: Walter Brown, Michael Latimer and Barry Foster (1972)
- Born: Ian Walter Brown; February 9, 1927; Auckland, New Zealand
- Died: October 31, 2013 (aged 86); Deloraine, Tasmania, Australia
- Occupation: Actor

Walter Brown (9 February 1927 – 31 October 2013) was a New Zealand film and television actor. He was born Ian Walter Brown in Auckland, New Zealand on 9 February 1927.

== Selected filmography ==
- Information Received (1961) - Vic Farlow
- The Frightened City (1961) - Billy Agnew
- Locker Sixty-Nine (1962) - Craig
- Mix Me a Person (1962) - Max Taplow
- Gideon's Way TV series episode "To Catch a Tiger" (1964) - John Borgman
- Two Letter Alibi (1962) - Mark Richards
- Devils of Darkness (1965) - Bruno
- The Brigand of Kandahar (1965) - Hitala
- Dracula: Prince of Darkness (1966) - Brother Mark
- Adventures of the Seaspray (1967, TV series, 33 episodes) - Dan Wells
- Some May Live (1967) - Maj. Matthews
- Shalako (1968) - Pete Wells
- The Best House in London (1969) - Mr. Barrett
- Farmer & Chase (1997) - Bank Police #1
- True Crime (1999) - Beechum Family Member (final film role)
