= John O'Shea (director) =

New Zealand filmmaker

John Dempsey O'Shea OBE (20 June 1920 – 8 July 2001) was a New Zealand independent filmmaker; he was a director, producer, writer and actor. He produced the only three feature films that were made in New Zealand between 1940 and 1970.

== Early life ==
New Plymouth is where O'Shea was born in 1920. His parents were both of Irish Catholic ancestry, his mother, Norah Frances Dempsey, was born in New Zealand and his father, John Joseph O’Shea, was from County Limerick, Ireland. He had three older siblings. He grew up in New Plymouth and Whanganui and then went to study in Wellington at Victoria University College where he got involved with a film society. He also studied at Christchurch Teachers' Training College, and in 1942 served in the New Zealand Army for two years during World War II with the ambulance corps in the Pacific and Italy.

== Career ==
He was active from 1940 to 1970, and in 1952 set up Pacific Films in Wellington with Roger Mirams. He produced numerous short films and the three New Zealand feature films made in that period: Broken Barrier (1952) with Roger Mirams, Runaway (1964), and Don't Let It Get You (1966) for which he is most remembered.

O'Shea was involved with the Tangata Whenua: People of the Land (1974) a six part television documentary series directed by New Zealand's first Māori screen director Barry Barclay. Other films he produced included are Pictures (1981), Among the Cinders (1983), Leave All Fair (1985) and Ngati (1987). He appeared in the spoof Forgotten Silver (1995).

Part of his legacy was the many people who Pacific Films gave valuable experiences to and went on to have notable careers such as Barry Barclay and Gaylene Preston. The tearooms at Pacific Films was described as "the venue for debate and argument with O'Shea promoting a lively, stimulating environment where success was measured in ideas, not seniority."

O'Shea was a lecturer, research historian, and assistant film censor and was a founding member of the New Zealand Film Archive in 1981.

== Awards ==
In the 1990 New Year Honours, O'Shea was appointed an Officer of the Order of the British Empire, for services to the film industry. Also in 1990 he was awarded the New Zealand 1990 Commemoration Medal for services to the film industry. In 1992 he received the New Zealand Film Commission Lifetime Achievement Award.

== Personal life ==
In 1946 O'Shea and Jean Cormie Douglas got married in Christchurch on 20 April, they settled in Wellington. They had three children together, Patrick, Rory and Kathy who all went on to work in the film industry.
