= Pacific Films =

New Zealand film production company

- Industry: Film
- Founded: 1948
- Founders: Alun Falconer; Roger Mirams
- Headquarters: Wellington, New Zealand
- Area served: New Zealand
- Products: Motion Pictures

Pacific Films is a film production company in New Zealand.

== History ==
The Pacific Film Unit was established in Wellington in 1948 by Alun Falconer and Roger Mirams, who were ex-National Film Unit staff. At that time, most films produced in New Zealand were documentaries made by the government's National Film Unit. John O'Shea joined in 1950. Falconer left to pursue a career in China and the company changed its name to Pacific Film Productions Ltd.

The first feature film was Broken Barrier (1952), which O'Shea produced and directed with Roger Mirams. In 1956, Mirams moved to Australia, and started a branch of the company in Sydney, though he later formed his own company, Roger Mirams Productions.

In 1960, the company had an office in Courtenay Place, Wellington, and was the New Zealand representative for British Movietone News and Fox Australian Movietone News. In 1969, the company had a staff of 15. The facility was in Kilbirnie, with the office in Lower Hutt, and the company also represented Hearst Metrotone News and BBC Television. Associated companies were Pacific Television Ltd. and Pacific Films Ltd.

John O'Shea was active from 1940 to 1970, and he produced numerous short films, as well as the three New Zealand feature films made in that period: Broken Barrier (1952) with Roger Mirams, Runaway (1964), and Don't Let It Get You (1966).

Pacific Films produced scores of road safety dramas, rugby tests, documentaries and commercials (O’Shea).
