= List of horror films of 1984 =

A list of horror films released in 1984.

| Title | Director(s) | Cast | Country | Notes | Ref. |
|---|---|---|---|---|---|
| Alapaap | Tata Esteban | William Martinez, Mark Gil, Michael De Mesa, Tanya Gomez | Philippines | | |
| The Barbaric Beast of Boggy Creek, Part II | Charles B. Pierce | Charles B. Pierce, Cindy Butler, Chuck Pierce | United States | Alternative title(s): Boggy Creek II; Boggy Creek II: And the Legend Continues | |
| Bloodsuckers from Outer Space | Glen Coburn | Thorn Meyes, Dennis Letts, Laura Ellis | United States | | |
| C.H.U.D. | Douglas Cheek | John Heard, Kim Greist, Daniel Stern | United States | | |
| Children of the Corn | Fritz Kiersch | Peter Horton, Linda Hamilton | United States | | |
| The Company of Wolves | Neil Jordan | Sarah Patterson, Angela Lansbury, David Warner (actor) | United Kingdom | | |
| Day of the Reaper | Tim Ritter | Cathy O'Hanlon, Patrick Foster | United States | | |
| Deadly Intruder | John McCauley | Danny Bonaduce, Stuart Whitman, Daniel Greene | United States | | |
| Disconnected | Gorman Bechard | Frances Raines, Mark Walker | United States | | |
| Don't Open Till Christmas | Edmund Purdom | Ricky Kennedy, Ray Marioni, Kelly Baker | United Kingdom | | |
| Fatal Games | Michael Elliot | Sally Kirkland, Lynn Banashek, Sean Masterson | United States | Alternative title(s): The Killing Touch; Olympic Nightmare | |
| Firestarter | Mark L. Lester | David Keith, Drew Barrymore, Heather Locklear | United States | | |
| Friday the 13th: The Final Chapter | Joseph Zito, Joe Hoffman | Crispin Glover, Kimberly Beck, Barbara Howard | United States | Fourth film of Friday the 13th franchise | |
| Gremlins | Joe Dante | Hoyt Axton, Zach Galligan, Corey Feldman | United States | First film of Gremlins franchise | |
| The Hills Have Eyes Part II | Wes Craven | Michael Berryman, Tamara Stafford, Kevin Spirtas | United States; United Kingdom | | |
| Hunters of the Night | Visa Mäkinen | Sari Sarmas, Reijo Kokko, Sirpa Taivainen | Finland | | |
| The Initiation | Larry Stewart | Vera Miles, Daphne Zuniga, James Read | United States | | |
| Innocent Prey | Colin Eggleston | P.J. Soles, Martin Balsam | Australia | | |
| Insane | Ben Yalung | Ace Vergel, Snooky Serna, Liza Lorena, Armida Siguion-Reyna, Angela Perez | Philippines | | |
| Invitation to Hell | Wes Craven | Robert Urich, Joanna Cassidy | United States | Television film | |
| Lovingly Yours, Helen: The Movie | Argel Joseph | Helen Vela, Ariosto Reyes Jr., Fred Montilla, Luz Fernandez, Ester Chavez, Joseph De Cordova, Dodong Gonzales, Cheche, Carmi Martin, Johnny Wilson, Alicia Alonzo, Ricky Davao, Princess Punzalan, Janice De Belen, Chiquito, Odette Khan, Rez Cortez, Jimmy Santos, Sheryl Cruz, Sheryl Cruz | Philippines | | |
| Monster Dog | Claudio Fragasso | Alice Cooper, Victoria Vera, Carlos Sanurio | Spain; United States | | |
| Murder Rock | Lucio Fulci | Olga Karlatos, Ray Lovelock, Claudio Cassinelli, Cosimo Cinieri, Giuseppe Mannajuolo | Italy | | |
| Night of the Comet | Thom Eberhardt | Kelli Maroney, Catherine Mary Stewart | United States | | |
| A Nightmare on Elm Street | Wes Craven | Robert Englund, Heather Langenkamp, John Saxon | United States | First film of A Nightmare on Elm Street franchise | |
| Purana Mandir | Shyam Ramsay, Tulsi Ramsay | Mohnish Bahl, Arti Gupta, Ajay Agarwal | India | | |
| Razorback | Russell Mulcahy | Gregory Harrison | Australia | | |
| Rocktober Blood | Beverly Sebastian | Tray Loren, Donna Scoggins | United States | | |
| Satan's Blade | L. Scott Castillo Jr. | Tom Bongiorno, Stephanie Leigh Steel, Thomas Cue | United States | | |
| Scream for Help | Michael Winner | Rachael Kelly, Marie Masters, David Allen Brooks | United Kingdom | | |
| The Sea Serpent | Amando de Ossorio | Timothy Bottoms, Taryn Power, León Klimovsky | Spain | | |
| Shadows Run Black | Howard Heard | Kevin Costner | United States | | |
| Shake, Rattle & Roll | Emmanuel Borlaza | Charito Solis, William Martinez, Janice de Belen, Rey Abellana, Joel Torre, Irma Alegre, Emily Loren, Arlene Muhlach, Mon Alvir, Peewee Quijano, Lito Gruet, Herbert Bautistashake-rattle-roll-am121838 | Philippines | | |
| Silent Madness | Simon Nuchtern | Belinda Montgomery, Viveca Lindfors, Katherine Kamhi | United States | | |
| Silent Night, Deadly Night | Charles E. Sellier Jr. | Lilyan Chauvin, Leo Geter, Linnea Quigley | United States | First film of Silent Night, Deadly Night film series | |
| Snake Sisters | Celso Ad. Castillo | Pepsi Paloma, Coca Nicolas, Sarsi Emmanuelle, Ernie Garcia | Philippines | | |
| Splatter University | Richard Haines | Francine Forbes, Cathy Lacommaro, Ric Randig | United States | | |
| Strangler vs. Strangler | Slobodan Sijan | Tasko Nacic, Nikola Simic, Srdjan Saper | Yugoslavia | | |
| The Tenant | Ronny Yu | Yun-Fat Chow, Sally Yeh, Melvin Wong | Hong Kong | | |
| The Toxic Avenger | Lloyd Kaufman, Michael Herz | Andrew Maranda, Mitch Cohen, Jennifer Prichard | United States | | |
| Terror in the Aisles | Andrew J. Kuehn | Donald Pleasence, Nancy Allen | United States | | |
| Veneno para las hadas | Carlos Enrique Taboada | Ana Patricia Rojo, Elsa María Gutiérrez | Mexico | | |

== Sources ==
- Albright, Brian (2012). Regional Horror Films, 1958-1990: A State-by-State Guide with Interviews. Jefferson, North Carolina: McFarland. ISBN 978-1-476-60042-0.
- Chibnall, Steve; Petley, Julian, eds. (2002). British Horror Cinema. New York City, New York: Routledge. ISBN 978-0-415-23003-2.
- Curti, Roberto (2019). Italian Gothic Horror Films: 1980–1989. Jefferson, North Carolina: McFarland. ISBN 978-1-476-67243-4.
- Hardy, Phil, ed. (1995). The Overlook Film Encyclopedia. Vol. 3. Overlook Press. ISBN 0-87951-624-0.
- Harper, Jim (2004). Legacy of Blood: A Comprehensive Guide to Slasher Movies. Manchester, England: Critical Vision. ISBN 978-1-900-48639-2.
- Heller-Nicholas, Alexandra (2011). Rape-Revenge Films: A Critical Study. McFarland. ISBN 978-0-7864-4961-3.
- Kay, Glenn (2012). Zombie Movies: The Ultimate Guide (2nd ed.). Chicago, Illinois: Chicago Review Press. ISBN 978-1-613-74425-3.
- Kerekes, David; Slater, David (2005). See No Evil: Banned Films and Video Controversy. London, England: Headpress. ISBN 978-1-900-48610-1.
- Muir, John Kenneth (2010). Horror Films of the 1980s. Jefferson, North Carolina: McFarland. ISBN 978-0-786-45501-0.
- Pitts, Michael R. (2013). Western Movies: A Guide to 5,105 Feature Films (2nd ed.). Jefferson, North Carolina: McFarland. ISBN 978-0-786-46372-5.
- Pratley, Gerald (2003). A Century of Canadian Cinema: Gerald Pratley's Feature Film Guide, 1900 to the Present. Toronto, Ontario: Lynx Images. ISBN 978-1-894-07321-9.
- Rockoff, Adam (2016) [2002]. Going to Pieces: The Rise and Fall of the Slasher Film, 1978–1986. Jefferson, North Carolina: McFarland. ISBN 978-0-786-49192-6.
- Shelley, Peter (2012). Australian Horror Films, 1973-2010. Jefferson, North Carolina: McFarland. ISBN 978-0-786-46167-7.
- Sipos, Thomas M. (2010). Horror Film Aesthetics: Creating the Visual Language of Fear. Jefferson, North Carolina: McFarland. ISBN 978-0-786-44972-9.
- Stanley, John (1988). Revenge of the Creature Features Movie Guide: An A to Z Encyclopedia to the Cinema of the Fantastic, or, Is There a Mad Doctor In the House?. Pacifica, California: Creatures at Large Press. ISBN 0-940064-04-9.
- Stine, Scott Aaron (2003). The Gorehound's Guide to Splatter Films of the 1980s. Jefferson, North Carolina: McFarland. ISBN 978-0-786-41532-8.
- Waller, Gregory Albert, ed. (1987). American Horrors: Essays on the Modern American Horror Film. Urbana, Illinois: University of Illinois Press. ISBN 978-0-252-01448-2.
- Young, R. G. (2000). The Encyclopedia of Fantastic Film: Ali Baba to Zombies. Hal Leonard Corporation. ISBN 1-55783-269-2.
