= Russian Winter (disambiguation) =

Russian Winter may refer to:

- Winter in Russia, meteorology
- "Russian Winter", military significance
- Titled works:
  - Songs:
    - On Krokus album Headhunter
    - On Bill Callahan album Sewn to the Sky
    - By the Canadian Northern Junk
    - By band London:
      - On album The Metal Years
      - On album Playa Del Rock
  - Novel (2010) by Daphne Kalotay
  - Russian Winter. Hoarfrost (painting) by Timke
- Russian Winter Meeting, annual track and field competition
