= The Single Girls =

1973 American film by Beverly Sebastian and Ferd Sebastian

- Theatrical release poster
- Directed by: Beverly Sebastian; Ferd Sebastian
- Written by: Beverly Sebastian (as "Ann Cawthorne")
- Story by: Ann Cawthorne
- Produced by: Beverly Sebastian; Ferd Sebastian
- Starring: Claudia Jennings; Greg Mullavey; Wayne C. Dvorak
- Cinematography: Ferd Sebastian
- Music by: Peter J. Elliott
- Production company: Sebastian Films Limited
- Distributed by: Dimension Pictures
- Release date: 28 March 1973
- Running time: 83 minutes
- Country: United States
- Language: English
- Budget: $45,000

The Single Girls (also known as Bloody Friday and Private School) is a 1973 American exploitation film directed by Beverly Sebastian and Ferd Sebastian, and starring Claudia Jennings, Jean Marie Ingels and Greg Mullavey.

Ferd Sebastian said ". . . it was like a lot of the people were in the 70s. Searching for love in all the wrong places. It was meant to be a light, sexy show with a murderer on the loose."

== Plot ==
A group of men and women travel to a Caribbean resort to discover themselves sexually, but unfortunately one of them has also discovered that they like to murder people, too.

== Cast ==
- Claudia Jennings as Allison
- Jean Marie Ingels as Phyllis
- Cheri Howell as Shannon (as Chéri Howell)
- Joan Prather as Lola
- Greg Mullavey as George
- Edward Blessington as Bud (as Ed Blessington)
- Victor Izay as Andrew
- Wayne C. Dvorak as Dr. Phillip Stevens (as Wayne Dvorek)
- Albert Popwell as Morris
- Jason Ledger as Blue
- Merci Montello as Cathy (as Mercy Rooney)
- Robyn Hilton as Denise

== Production ==
Ferd Sebastian said this was the first film he made with his wife that "we had a crew on. We added a sound man, boom man and a gaffer."

The film was shot in two main locations: interiors at the Westlake Inn, Westlake Village, with all other locations were at Paradise Cove, in Malibu.

== Soundtrack ==
The film features "Ms. America," co-written and performed by Bobby Hart of the Monkees fame.

== Trivia ==
This film was made before 'Gator Bait (1973), which also starred the 1970 Playboy "Playmate of the Year" Claudia Jennings. The Sebastians and Jennings became close friends while making The Single Girls and Jennings asked the Sebastians to write a film for her. That film was 'Gator Bait.

== See also ==
- List of American films of 1974
