= List of highest-grossing horror films =

The following page lists the highest-grossing horror films and highest-grossing horror film franchises at the box office. The figures have not been adjusted for inflation. The list generally does not include giant monster films, which are instead on the list of highest-grossing science fiction films.

== Highest-grossing horror films ==
† Background shading indicates films playing in the week commencing 20 November 2026 in theaters around the world.

Rank	Film	Year	Worldwide gross	Ref
1	It	2017	$719,766,009	
2	The Sixth Sense	1999	$672,806,292	
3	I Am Legend	2007	$585,532,684	
4	World War Z	2013	$540,007,876	
5	Obsession †	2026	$525,089,752	
6	The Conjuring: Last Rites	2025	$499,256,445	
7	Jaws	1975	$495,201,848	
8	It Chapter Two	2019	$473,123,154	
9	The Exorcist	1973	$430,872,776	
10	Resident Evil †	2026	$416,478,292	
11	Signs	2002	$408,250,578	
12	Prometheus	2012	$403,354,469	
13	Backrooms	2026	$400,383,733	
14	Sinners	2025	$371,568,759	
15	The Nun	2018	$366,082,797	
16	Hannibal	2001	$351,692,268	
17	Alien: Romulus	2024	$350,865,342	
18	A Quiet Place	2018	$340,955,294	
19	Black Swan	2010	$332,082,290	
20	The Conjuring 2	2016	$322,811,702	
21	The Conjuring	2013	$320,415,166	
22	Final Destination Bloodlines	2025	$317,854,739	
23	Resident Evil: The Final Chapter	2017	$314,101,190	
24	Annabelle: Creation	2017	$306,592,201	
25	Resident Evil: Afterlife	2010	$300,228,084	
26	Van Helsing	2004	$300,157,638	
27	A Quiet Place Part II	2020	$297,372,261	
28	Five Nights at Freddy's	2023	$297,144,130	
29	What Lies Beneath	2000	$291,420,351	
30	Split	2017	$278,754,594	
31	The Silence of the Lambs	1991	$275,726,716	
32	Weapons	2025	$270,072,492	
33	The Nun II	2023	$269,467,073	
34	A Quiet Place: Day One	2024	$261,907,653	
35	Halloween	2018	$259,939,869	
36	The Village	2004	$257,641,634	
37	Annabelle	2014	$257,589,952	
38	Us	2019	$256,071,218	
39	Get Out	2017	$255,751,443	
40	The Ring	2002	$249,348,933	
41	The Blair Witch Project	1999	$248,639,099	
42	Dark Shadows	2012	$245,564,215	
43	Alien: Covenant	2017	$240,892,187	
44	Resident Evil: Retribution	2012	$240,647,629	
45	Five Nights at Freddy's 2	2025	$239,502,619	
46	Annabelle Comes Home	2019	$231,252,591	
47	Constantine	2005	$230,912,116	
48	Interview with the Vampire	1994	$223,664,608	
49	Dracula Untold	2014	$220,241,723	
50	Smile	2022	$217,408,513	

== Highest-grossing film franchises ==
† Background shading indicates films playing in the week commencing 20 November 2026 in theaters around the world.

Highest-grossing horror film franchises and film series^{[§]}(The films in each franchise can be viewed by selecting "show")

Rank	Series	Total worldwide box office	No. of films	Average of films	Highest-grossing film

1	The Conjuring Universe	$2,903,037,098	11	$263,912,463	Last Rites ($499,156,445)
/ The Conjuring series / $1,348,914,363 / 4 / $337,228,591 / Last Rites ($499,156,445); 1 / Last Rites (2025) / $499,256,445; 2 / The Conjuring 2 (2016) / $322,811,702; 3 / The Conjuring (2013) / $320,415,166; 4 / The Devil Made Me Do It (2021) / $206,431,050
/ Annabelle series / $795,434,744 / 3 / $265,144,915 / Creation ($306,592,201); 1 / Creation (2017) / $306,592,201; 2 / Annabelle (2014) / $257,589,952; 3 / Comes Home (2019) / $231,252,591
/ The Nun series / $635,549,870 / 2 / $317,774,935 / The Nun ($366,082,797); 1 / The Nun (2018) / $366,082,797; 2 / The Nun II (2023) / $269,467,073
The Curse of La Llorona (2019) / $123,233,739
Wolves at the Door (2016) / $4,382

2
Alien
$1,995,371,782
9
$221,707,976
Prometheus ($403,354,469)

	Main series	$1,687,653,807	7	$241,093,401	Prometheus ($403,354,469)
1	Prometheus (2012)	$403,354,469			
2	Romulus (2024)	$350,865,342			
3	Covenant (2017)	$240,892,187			
4	Alien (1979)	$188,034,787			
5	Aliens (1986)	$183,316,455			
6	Resurrection (1997)	$161,376,069			
7	Alien 3 (1992)	$159,814,498			

	Alien vs. Predator	$307,717,975	2	$153,858,988	Alien vs. Predator ($177,427,090)
1	Alien vs. Predator (2004)	$177,427,090			
2	Requiem (2007)	$130,290,885			

3	Resident Evil †	$1,694,239,461	12	$141,186,622	Resident Evil (2026) ($409,816,199)
/ Original series / $1,237,978,176 / 6 / $206,329,696 / The Final Chapter ($314,101,190); 1 / The Final Chapter (2017) / $314,101,190; 2 / Afterlife (2010) / $300,228,084; 3 / Retribution (2012) / $240,647,629; 4 / Extinction (2007) / $149,871,103; 5 / Apocalypse (2004) / $129,342,769; 6 / Resident Evil (2002) / $103,787,401
Resident Evil (2026) † / $409,816,199
Welcome to Raccoon City (2021) / $41,914,915
/ Animated series / $4,110,900 / 4 / $1,027,725 / Damnation ($2,325,035); 1 / Damnation (2012) / $2,325,035; 2 / Vendetta (2017) / $1,203,792; 3 / Degeneration (2008) / $538,912; 4 / Death Island (2023) / $43,161

4	It	$1,177,366,042	2	$588,683,021	It ($704,242,888)
1	It (2017)	$704,242,888			
2	Chapter Two (2019)	$473,123,154			

5	Saw	$1,141,842,812	10	$114,184,281	Saw III ($164,874,275)
1	Saw III (2006)	$164,874,275			
2	Saw II (2005)	$152,925,093			
3	Saw IV (2007)	$139,352,633			
4	Saw 3D (2010)	$136,151,680			
5	Saw V (2008)	$118,209,778			
6	Saw X (2023)	$111,823,047			
7	Jigsaw (2017)	$104,223,315			
8	Saw (2004)	$103,911,669			
9	Saw VI (2009)	$69,752,402			
10	Spiral (2021)	$40,618,920			

6	Scream	$1,126,254,066	7	$160,893,438	Scream 7 ($213,835,967)
1	Scream 7 (2026)	$213,835,967			
2	Scream (1996)	$173,046,663			
3	Scream 2 (1997)	$172,363,301			
4	Scream VI (2023)	$169,063,850			
5	Scream 3 (2000)	$161,838,076			
6	Scream (2022)	$138,874,789			
7	Scream 4 (2011)	$97,231,420			

7	Final Destination	$983,938,704	6	$163,989,784	Bloodlines ($315,954,739)
1	Bloodlines (2025)	$315,954,739			
2	The Final Destination (2009)	$187,384,627			
3	Final Destination 5 (2011)	$157,887,643			
4	Final Destination 3 (2006)	$118,890,272			
5	Final Destination (2000)	$112,880,294			
6	Final Destination 2 (2003)	$90,941,129			

8
Predator
$935,444,330
7
$133,634,904
Badlands ($184,561,056)

	Main series	$627,726,355	5	$125,545,271	Badlands ($184,561,056)
1	Badlands (2025)	$184,561,056			
2	The Predator (2018)	$160,542,134			
3	Predators (2010)	$127,234,389			
4	Predator (1987)	$98,268,458			
5	Predator 2 (1990)	$57,120,318			

	Alien vs. Predator	$307,717,975	2	$153,858,988	Alien vs. Predator ($177,427,090)
1	Alien vs. Predator (2004)	$177,427,090			
2	Requiem (2007)	$130,290,885			

9	Hannibal	$927,409,175	5	$185,481,835	Hannibal ($351,692,268)
1	Hannibal (2001)	$351,692,268			
2	The Silence of the Lambs (1991)	$275,726,716			
3	Red Dragon (2002)	$209,196,298			
4	Hannibal Rising (2007)	$82,169,884			
5	Manhunter (1986)	$8,624,009			

10	Insidious †	$915,830,973	6	$152,638,496	The Red Door ($189,086,877)
1	The Red Door (2023)	$189,086,877			
2	The Last Key (2018)	$172,811,971			
3	Out of the Further (2026) †	$171,451,001			
4	Chapter 2 (2013)	$161,921,515			
5	Chapter 3 (2015)	$120,453,155			
6	Insidious (2011)	$100,106,454			

11	A Quiet Place	$900,235,208	3	$300,078,403	A Quiet Place ($340,955,294)
1	A Quiet Place (2018)	$340,955,294			
2	A Quiet Place Part II (2021)	$297,372,261			
3	Day One (2024)	$261,907,653			

12	Paranormal Activity	$891,360,880	6	$148,560,147	Paranormal Activity 3 ($207,039,844)
1	Paranormal Activity 3 (2011)	$207,039,844			
2	Paranormal Activity (2007)	$194,183,034			
3	Paranormal Activity 2 (2010)	$177,512,032			
4	Paranormal Activity 4 (2012)	$142,817,992			
5	The Marked Ones (2014)	$90,904,854			
6	The Ghost Dimension (2015)	$78,903,124			

13	Halloween	$886,099,414	13	$68,161,493	Halloween (2018) ($259,939,869)
1	Halloween (2018)	$259,939,869			
2	Kills (2021)	$133,423,964			
3	Ends (2022)	$105,400,796			
4	Halloween (2007)	$80,460,948			
5	20 Years Later (1998)	$75,041,738			
6	Halloween (1978)	$70,274,000			
7	Halloween II (2009)	$39,421,467			
8	Resurrection (2002)	$37,664,855			
9	Halloween II (1981)	$25,533,818			
10	The Return of Michael Myers (1988)	$17,768,757			
11	The Curse of Michael Myers (1995)	$15,126,948			
12	Season of the Witch (1982)	$14,400,000			
13	The Revenge of Michael Myers (1989)	$11,642,254			

14	Jaws	$843,970,292	4	$210,992,573	Jaws ($495,201,848)
1	Jaws (1975)	$495,201,848			
2	Jaws 2 (1978)	$208,900,376			
3	Jaws 3-D (1983)	$87,987,055			
4	The Revenge (1987)	$51,881,013			

15	The Exorcist	$716,005,754	6	$119,334,292	The Exorcist ($430,872,776)
1	The Exorcist (1973)	$430,872,776			
2	Believer (2023)	$136,998,069			
3	The Beginning (2004)	$78,110,021			
4	The Exorcist III (1990)	$39,024,251			
5	The Heretic (1977)	$30,749,142			
6	Dominion (2005)	$251,495			

16	The Ring	$654,610,579	11	$59,510,053	The Ring ($249,348,933)
/ American series (2002–2017) / $496,425,772 / 3 / $165,475,257 / The Ring ($249,348,933); 1 / The Ring (2002) / $249,348,933; 2 / The Ring Two (2005) / $163,995,949; 3 / Rings (2017) / $83,080,890
Japanese series (1998–2019) / $156,495,481 (Note: See The Ring (franchise) § Box office performance)
The Ring Virus (1999) / $1,689,326

17	I Am Legend	$589,532,684	2	$294,766,342	I Am Legend ($585,532,684)
1	I Am Legend (2007)	$585,532,684			
2	The Omega Man (1971)	$4,000,000			

18	The Purge	$533,051,095	5	$106,610,219	The First Purge ($136,211,978)
1	The First Purge (2018)	$136,211,978			
2	Election Year (2016)	$118,587,880			
3	Anarchy (2014)	$111,928,365			
4	The Purge (2013)	$89,328,627			
5	The Forever Purge (2021)	$76,994,245			

19	Five Nights at Freddy's	$531,092,035	2	$265,546,018	Five Nights at Freddy's ($291,589,416)
1	Five Nights at Freddy's (2023)	$291,589,416			
2	Five Nights at Freddy's 2 (2025)	$239,502,619			

20	A Nightmare on Elm Street	$545,221,132	9	$60,580,126	Freddy vs. Jason ($116,632,628)
1	Freddy vs. Jason (2003)	$116,632,628			
2	A Nightmare on Elm Street (2010)	$115,664,037			
3	A Nightmare on Elm Street (1984)	$112,000,000			
4	The Dream Master (1988)	$49,369,899			
5	Dream Warriors (1987)	$44,793,222			
6	Freddy's Dead: The Final Nightmare (1991)	$34,872,033			
7	Freddy's Revenge (1985)	$29,999,213			
8	The Dream Child (1989)	$22,168,359			
9	Wes Craven's New Nightmare (1994)	$19,721,741			

== Timeline of highest-grossing films ==
Year	Title	Record-setting gross	Ref
1930	Ingagi	$4,000,000	
1931	Frankenstein	$12,000,000	
1953	House of Wax	$23,750,000	
1960	Psycho	$32,192,459	
1968	Rosemary's Baby	$33,397,492	
1972	Psycho	$50,000,000	
1973	The Exorcist	$88,500,000	
1974	The Exorcist	$193,005,820	
1999	The Exorcist	$430,872,776	
1999	The Sixth Sense	$672,806,292	
2017	It	$704,242,888	

== Box office ticket sales ==
The following is a list of horror films which sold more than 25 million tickets at the worldwide box office.

Film	Year	Tickets (est.)	Territories included (Note: Box office territories for which the film's ticket sales data are currently known)	Ref
Jaws	1975	243,277,230	Worldwide	
The Exorcist	1973	214,900,000	Worldwide	
It	2017	137,100,000	Worldwide	
The Sixth Sense	1999	114,488,893	Americas, Europe, Australia, Japan, Korea	(Note: The Sixth Sense admissions: United States – 57,800,000; Argentina, Australia, Brazil – 10,495,647; Germany, Spain, Italy – 13,671,308; France – 7,800,000; Other European countries – 16,424,177; Japan – 7,500,000; South Korea (Seoul City) – 797,761)
It Chapter Two	2019	72,600,000	Worldwide	
Obsession †	2026	66,000,000	Worldwide	(Note: Obsession admissions: United States – 23,113,000; Brazil, France, Germany, Italy, Russia, Spain – 5,858,271; United Kingdom – 2,600,000; Mexico – 2,020,000; China – 868,687; Poland – 550,000; Turkey – 548,016; Saudi Arabia – 518,000; Argentina – 404,529; United Arab Emirates – 377,225; Greece – 255,719; Czech Republic – 160,235; Portugal – 147,230; Norway – 120,236; Romania – 98,716; Switzerland – 86,507; Hungary – 76,022; Finland – 66,155; Bulgaria – 49,725; Slovakia – 44,740)
I Am Legend	2007	65,480,980	USA, Brazil, Europe, Russia, Japan, Korea	(Note: I Am Legend admissions: United States – 37,759,000; Brazil and Russia – 3,591,683; France – 3,000,000; Other European countries – 15,070,072; Japan – 3,600,000; South Korea – 2,460,225)
The Conjuring 2	2016	64,200,000	Worldwide	
Signs	2002	61,795,921	USA, Europe, Brazil, Japan, South Korea	(Note: Signs admissions: United States – 39,440,000; France and Germany – 4,550,741; United Kingdom – 3,700,000; Other European countries – 8,302,186; Brazil – 2,709,138; Japan – 2,800,000; South Korea (Seoul City) – 293,856)
Resident Evil: The Final Chapter	2017	61,100,000	Worldwide	
Resident Evil †	2026	53,700,000	Worldwide	
Gremlins	1984	61,010,552	United States and Europe	
Annabelle Creation	2017	60,000,000	Worldwide	
House of Wax	1953	55,377,000	United States, France, Spain	
World War Z	2013	52,500,000	Worldwide	
Legend of Dinosaurs & Monster Birds	1977	49,400,000	Japan and Soviet Union	
Young Frankenstein	1974	45,647,300	United States and Canada	
The Conjuring: Last Rites	2025	42,800,000	Worldwide	
Psycho	1960	42,666,700	United States and Canada	
Annabelle Comes Home	2019	35,200,000	Worldwide	
Jaws 2	1978	34,718,800	United States and Canada	
The Amityville Horror	1979	34,435,100	United States and Canada	
Frankenstein	1931	34,000,000	United States and Canada	
Madhumati	1958	32,500,000	India	
Alien	1979	31,885,000	United States and Canada	
The Silence of the Lambs	1991	31,055,300	United States and Canada	
The Conjuring	2013	30,900,000	Worldwide	
Cat People	1942	30,000,000	Worldwide	
What Lies Beneath	2000	28,841,900	United States and Canada	
The Omen	1976	28,602,300	United States and Canada	
Rosemary's Baby	1968	28,470,288	United States and France	
Resident Evil: Retribution	2012	28,200,000	Worldwide	
Annabelle	2014	27,900,000	Worldwide	
The Blair Witch Project	1999	27,665,200	United States and Canada	
Poltergeist	1982	26,226,800	United States and Canada	
Interview with the Vampire	1994	25,127,600	United States and Canada	

== Highest-grossing films by year ==
Year	Film	Worldwide gross	Ref
1930	Ingagi	$4,000,000	
1931	Frankenstein	$12,007,423	
1932	Doctor X	$594,000	
1933	Mystery of the Wax Museum	$1,106,000	
1934	The Black Cat	$236,000	
1935	Bride of Frankenstein	$2,000,000	
1936	The Walking Dead	$300,000	
1937	?	?	
1938	?	?	
1939	?	?	
1940	The Invisible Man Returns	$815,000	
1941	Dr. Jekyll and Mr. Hyde	$2,300,000	
1942	Cat People	$8,000,000	
1943	Phantom of the Opera	$1,600,000	
1944	The Invisible Man's Revenge	$765,700	
1945	The Picture of Dorian Gray	$2,370,000	
1946	The Spiral Staircase	$2,800,000	
1947	?	?	
1948	Abbott and Costello Meet Frankenstein	$3,200,000	
1949	Abbott and Costello Meet the Killer, Boris Karloff	$1,850,000	
1950	?	?	
1951	The Thing from Another World	$1,950,000	
1952	The Black Castle	$1,300,000	
1953	House of Wax	$23,750,522	
1954	Them!	$2,200,000	
1955	It Came from Beneath the Sea	$1,700,000	
1956	Invasion of the Body Snatchers	$3,000,000	
1957	The Curse of Frankenstein	$8,000,000	
1958	Madhumati	$8,400,000	
1959	House on Haunted Hill	$2,500,000	
1960	Psycho	$50,000,000	
1961	The Pit and the Pendulum	$2,000,000	
1962	Bees Saal Baad	$6,300,000	
1963	The Birds	$11,436,929	
1964	Strait-Jacket	$2,195,195	
1965	Repulsion	$3,100,000	
1966	Queen of Blood	$17,300,000	
1967	Berserk!	$3,195,000	
1968	Rosemary's Baby	$33,397,492	
1969	Eye of the Cat	$1,200,000	
1970	House of Dark Shadows	$1,836,000	
1971	Willard	$14,545,941	
1972	The Last House on the Left	$3,100,000	
1973	The Exorcist	$430,872,776	
1974	Young Frankenstein	$86,438,832	
1975	Jaws	$495,201,848	
1976	The Omen	$60,922,980	
1977	Exorcist II: The Heretic	$30,749,142	
1978	Jaws 2	$208,900,376	
1979	Alien	$188,034,787	
1980	Friday the 13th	$59,800,000	
1981	An American Werewolf In London	$61,973,249	
1982	Poltergeist	$121,706,019	
1983	Jaws 3-D	$87,987,055	
1984	Gremlins	$153,642,180	
1985	Day of the Dead	$34,004,262	
1986	Aliens	$183,291,893	
1987	Predator	$98,268,458	
1988	A Nightmare on Elm Street 4: The Dream Master	$49,369,899	
1989	Pet Sematary	$57,469,467	
1990	Flatliners	$61,489,638	
1991	The Silence of the Lambs	$275,726,716	
1992	Bram Stoker's Dracula	$215,862,692	
1993	Jason Goes to Hell: The Final Friday	$15,935,068	
1994	Interview with the Vampire	$223,664,608	
1995	Species	$113,354,449	
1996	Scream	$173,046,663	
1997	Scream 2	$172,363,301	
1998	Blade	$131,237,688	
1999	The Sixth Sense	$672,806,292	
2000	What Lies Beneath	$291,420,351	
2001	Hannibal	$351,692,268	
2002	Signs	$408,250,578	
2003	Gothika	$141,591,324	
2004	The Grudge	$187,281,115	
2005	Constantine	$230,884,728	
2006	Saw III	$164,874,275	
2007	I Am Legend	$585,532,684	
2008	Cloverfield	$172,394,180	
2009	Paranormal Activity	$194,183,034	
2010	Black Swan	$332,082,290	
2011	Paranormal Activity 3	$207,039,844	
2012	Prometheus	$403,354,469	
2013	World War Z	$540,007,876	
2014	Annabelle	$257,589,952	
2015	Insidious: Chapter 3	$120,453,155	
2016	The Conjuring 2	$322,811,702	
2017	It	$704,242,888	
2018	The Nun	$366,050,119	
2019	It Chapter Two	$473,123,154	
2020	A Quiet Place Part II	$297,372,261	
2021	The Conjuring: The Devil Made Me Do It	$206,431,050	
2022	Smile	$217,408,513	
2023	Five Nights at Freddy's	$297,144,130	
2024	Alien: Romulus	$350,865,342	
2025	The Conjuring: Last Rites	$499,156,445	
2026	Obsession †	$525,089,752	

== See also ==
- Lists of highest-grossing films
  - List of highest-grossing R-rated films
- List of highest-grossing media franchises
