= Delta Fox =

- Directed by: Ferd Sebastian; Beverly Sebastian
- Written by: Ferd Sebastian; Beverly Sebastian
- Produced by: Ferd Sebatian; Beverly Sebastian
- Starring: Stuart Whitman
- Release date: 1979
- Running time: 93 mins
- Country: United States
- Language: English

Delta Fox is a 1979 American film from Beverly and Ferd Sebastian. The movie was made for cable.

In 1999, when Ferd Sebastian was asked by the online publication Mondo Stumpo (reposted November 25, 2007) how was he able to make action films like Delta Fox on ultra-low budgets with top actors, he stated, "We just used very small crews and [again] we do so much of the work ourselves. Also Beverly is the best producer and scheduler I have ever seen."

== Premise ==
Former Mafia bagman Delta Fox (Richard Lynch) is released from prison to help a government official (John Ireland) try to bring down a crooked tax lawyer (Stuart Whitman), but soon a hit is placed on him. During his escape, Fox kidnaps a young woman (Priscilla Barnes) who helps him get out of Florida and back to San Francisco.

== Cast ==
- Stuart Whitman
- John Ireland
- Richard Jaeckel
- Richard Lynch
- Priscilla Barnes
- Julius Harris
- Larry Gelman
- Newell Alexander
- Tracy Sebastian
- Damon Reicher
- Susan Holloway

John Ireland also starred in Ferd and Beverly Sebastian's On the Air Live with Captain Midnight with their son, Tracy Sebastian, who also starred his parents' earlier production, Flash and the Firecat.

The film's cinematographer was an uncredited Ronald Victor Garcia, later nominated for and winning several cinematography awards.

As with Misty Rowe launching a U.S television career on Hee-Haw after starring in The Hitchhikers, an earlier Sebastian film production, Priscilla Barnes later became a major television star on Three's Company.

== Reception ==
Shock Cinema said the film "gets off to a fast start but slows to an idle about the time the Fox pulls into Louisiana."

Michael Elliot, a pro-critic at Letterboxd, said "the film Delta Fox is basically a low-rent version of The Driver, [a 1978 action film by director Walter Hill starring Ryan O'Neal] which offers up a terrific cast."
