= 'Gator Bait II: Cajun Justice =

1988 film by Beverly Sebastion

- VHS cover
- Directed by: Beverly Sebastian; Ferd Sebastian
- Written by: Beverly Sebastian
- Produced by: Beverly Sebastian; Ferd Sebastian
- Starring: Jan MacKenzie; Jocelyn Boudreaux; Rocky Dugas; Keith Gros
- Music by: Julius Adams; Vernon Rodrique; George H. Hamilton
- Distributed by: Paramount Pictures
- Release date: 1988
- Running time: 95 minutes
- Country: United States
- Language: English

'Gator Bait II: Cajun Justice is a 1988 sequel to the 1974 film 'Gator Bait, written, produced and directed by Beverly Sebastian and Ferd Sebastian. It is their 12th film overall, followed by their final film, the motorcycle action-drama, Running Cool (1993).

The film was released 14 years after the first film, which starred the 1970 Playboy "Playmate of the Year," Claudia Jennings. The films stars Jan MacKenzie in her place, as Jennings died in a car accident in Malibu, California in 1979.

== Plot ==
A sweet city girl is initiated into the rugged ways of the Louisiana bayou by her good-natured Cajun husband "Big T," she ends up getting kidnapped and violated by Big T's chief rival, Leroy, and his swarthy, brutish family as part of an ongoing feud. She manages to escape and return armed with some Cajun justice.

== Cast ==
- Melissa Alleman as Bridesmaid
- Jocelyn Boudreaux as Bridesmaid
- Rocky Dugas as Emile
- Keith Gros as Abert
- Reyn Hubbard as Geke
- Sid Larrwiere as Drunk
- Jan MacKenzie as Angelique
- Randolph Parro as Cajun Gentleman
- Susan Serigny as Cajun Cook
- Jerry Armstrong as Joe Boy
- Betty Flemming as Cajun Woman
- Levita Gros as Bartender
- Brad Koepenick as Luke
- Tray Loren as Big T.
- Paul Muzzcat as Leroy
- Ben Sebastian as Elick
- Peter Torrito as Bestman

== Production ==
Ferd Sebastian told the online film magazine Mondo Stumpo during an interview (1999) that the reason he went back to make a sequel was Paramount Pictures requested one. "At that time [the first one] was the #1 grossing film in Europe and they wanted [another] one," said Sebastian. "So I made 'Gator Bait II. Claudia [Jennings] was dead, so I found a new actress: Jan Duncan, who later changed her name [professionally] to Jan MacKenzie, who later changed it to Jan Sebastian. She is my daughter-in-law [married to Ben Sebastian].

"She's not a professional wrestler [through she later worked as one]. I had a choice of getting a pro wrestler and teaching her to act or get an actress and teaching her to wrestle. I chose the latter [with Jan]," Ferd said of Jan. MacKenzie exhibited her wresting skilled learned in the Sebastian's American Angels: Baptism of Blood (1990).

Regarding his memories of Claudia Jennings, Sebastian told the online publication Hysteria Lives UK, "Claudia, Beverly and I all loved each other. It is as simple as that. Claudia became our best friend. 'Gator Bait was written for Claudia, she wanted to do a film with not a lot of dialog, so 'Gator Bait was it."

== Alternate Versions ==
The DVD "Director's Special Edition" by Panama Films contains added nudity and extends the rape scenes. The extras include "The Making of Gator Bait II" featurette (14:28), "Beverly Sebastian Today" featurette (8:56), and "A Message from Ferd Sebastian" featurette (9:00).

The film was also released in France under the title, Rednecks.
