= London Daze =

Studio album by Spiders & Snakes/London
- Released: 2000
- Genre: Glam rock
- Label: Cleopatra Records
- Producer: Dino Maddelone

Spiders & Snakes chronology
| Astropop (1997) | London Daze (2000) | Hollywood Ghosts (2005) |

London chronology
| Playa Del Rock (1990) | London Daze (2000) | The Metal Years (2008) |

London Daze is the sixth album by Spiders & Snakes, released by Cleopatra Records in 2000. The album features rerecordings of songs that were recorded or played by frontman Lizzie Grey's previous band London.

The album's most successful track was the rerecording of "Public Enemy #1", which was also recorded by Mötley Crüe and released on their debut album Too Fast For Love (1981). According to Grey, the track received "a great deal of airplay both domestically and international[ly]."

London Daze also includes three tracks from a 16-track demo recorded by London in 1980 featuring ex-Mott the Hoople vocalist Nigel Benjamin on vocals and Mötley Crüe bassist Nikki Sixx on bass.

== Track listing ==
=== Spiders & Snakes ===
1. "London Daze"
2. "Nonstop Rock" (London cover)
3. "Party in Hollywood" (London cover)
4. "Radio Stars" (London cover)
5. "Don't Know When to Stop"
6. "Public Enemy #1" (Mötley Crüe cover)
7. "Run, Run, Run" (Jo Jo Gunne cover)
8. "Elvis' TV"
9. "Rock and Roll Queen" (Mott the Hoople cover)
10. "2000 Rock & Roll"

=== London ===
11. "Nobody Loves You Like I Do"
12. "Straight From the Heart"
13. "Dream Girl"

== Band members ==
=== Spiders & Snakes ===
- Lizzie Grey - vocal, guitar
- Doug E. Sex - guitar
- Leigh Lawson - bass
- Timothy Jay - drums

=== London ===
- Nigel Benjamin - lead vocals
- Lizzie Grey - guitar
- Nikki Sixx - bass
- John St. John - keyboards
- Dane Rage - drums
