= The Metal Years =

The Metal Years may refer to:

- The Decline of Western Civilization Part II: The Metal Years, 1988 documentary film
- Career of Evil: The Metal Years, 1990 album by Blue Öyster Cult
- The Metal Years (album), 2008 album by band London, live recorded session that took place in 1989 right after their appearance in The Decline of Western Civilization Part II: The Metal Years
