= Spiders & Snakes =

Spiders & Snakes may refer to:

- Spiders & Snakes (song), by Jim Stafford
- Spiders & Snakes (band), a band
