= Rocktober Blood =

- Directed by: Beverly Sebastian
- Written by: Beverly Sebastian; Ferd Sebastian
- Produced by: Beverly Sebastian; Ferd Sebastian
- Starring: Tray Loren; Donna Scoggins; Cana Cockrell
- Distributed by: Vestron Video
- Release date: 1984
- Running time: 88 minutes
- Country: United States
- Language: English

Rocktober Blood is a 1984 horror film directed by Beverly Sebastian, starring Tray Loren, Donna Scoggins, and Cana Cockrell.

The film also stars the Los Angeles rock band Sorcery, as well as musician Nigel Benjamim, as actors and on the soundtrack.

The film was co-written by the late Ferd Sebastian, who died in March 2022.

Tray Loren, aka Tracy Sebastian, appeared in other Sebastian productions, such as 'Gator Bait, Flash and the Firecat, and On the Air Live with Captain Midnight. After his film career, Loren became a successful restaurateur on Florida's west coast.

== Plot ==
The film opens in a recording studio, where singer Billy "Eye" Harper is in a session with his band and his girlfriend, Lynn Starling, also a backup singer. After he finishes the recording, Billy and the rest of the band leave. Despite trying to record her own vocal tracks, Lynn is left to go to the Jacuzzi upstairs, after refusing Kevin, the recording engineer's, offer to join her.

Meanwhile, Billy returns to the studio and finds only Kevin and Mary, Kevin's assistant. In an enigmatic move, Billy kills Kevin by slitting his throat and impales Mary on a wall-mounted coat peg. When Lynn returns, she finds Billy smoking some drugs at the recording studio's control panel. Lynn is unaware that Billy has just killed both Kevin and Mary while she was gone. Once Lynn finds out, she is saved by some security guards.

Two years later, it is revealed that Billy was captured, tried, and executed. It is now the "Rocktober Blood Tour Press Party", and Lynn and the remaining band members are touring as "Headmistress". A VJ who interviews Lynn, asks several questions about the band's tour, as well as Billy's fall from grace, to which Lynn responds by stating that identifying Billy was "the hardest thing she ever had to do." A mysterious figure then appears in a Halloween "death" mask, and tells Lynn to meet with Chris, the band's manager, in the office. When she arrives in the office, she is cornered by Billy, in the same death mask, who leaves her curled up and crying on the floor. After that, Billy persistently stalks Lynn, killing people involved with her along the way, but hiding their bodies, to make others think she is crazy by claiming that Billy is after her.

Eventually, Honey convinces Lynn to dig up Billy's grave. They find out that Billy is dead, and Lynn assumes that she is hallucinating. The next night, Lynn and the band are getting ready for the show when Billy reappears and tells Lynn that he is really Billy's twin brother, John Harper, and that she identified the wrong man. John tells Lynn that the people he killed valued Billy more than him, even though he wrote the renowned songs himself. Then John chloroforms Lynn, and the show begins. A prop coffin rises on stage, and Lynn is revealed inside. John tells her that his plan is to kill her as the show's grand finale. When John removes his mask, however, security rushes in and attacks him with an electric guitar.

John manages to scream out the final lyrics to "I'm Back" before the credits roll.

== Reissue ==
On August 2, 2023, the movie review YouTube channel, Planet CHH, announced an official hard media blu-ray restoration by the boutique, film preservation and distribution shingle, Terror Vision. The previous, controversial, troubled hard media release of Rocktober Blood in 2016 was reported on June 8, 2016, by the YouTube channel, The Analog Archivist. As of February 2025, no additional information on the Terror Vision reissue is available.

== Cast ==
- Tray Loren as Billy "Eye" Harper/John Harper
- Donna Scoggins as Lynn Starling
- Kevin Eddy as Kevin
- Mary Well as Mary
- Cana Cockrell as Honey Bear
- Renee Hubbard as Donna Lewis
- Nigel Benjamin as Chris Keane
- Ben Sebastian as head of security

Headmistress Band

- Perry Morris - Drums
- Richard Taylor - Guitar
- Richie King - Bass
- Lon Cohen - Guitar

== Soundtrack and contributing artists' histories ==
Rocktober Blood (Original Motion Picture Soundtrack)

Soundtrack album by Various artists
- Released: 1984
- Studio: Record Plant, Los Angeles
- Genre: Heavy metal; hard rock
- Label: Sebastian International
- Producer: Ben Sebastian; Ferd Sebastian

The songs "Killer on the Loose," "I'm Back," "Rainbow Eyes" and "Watching You" on the soundtrack were recorded by the Los Angeles-based band Sorcery, who also play the part of the band Headmistress in the film.

On the tracks written and performed by Sorcery, Nigel Benjamin, formerly with the British rock band, Mott, and the L.A glam-rock band, London with Nikki Sixx, sang three songs: "Killer on the Loose," "I'm Back," and "Watching You." Sorcery also appeared in and performed music for the 1978 action film, Stunt Rock. As Wildcats, with David Glen Eisley on lead vocals, later of Giuffria, Sorcery's music appeared in Twice Dead (1988). Their other soundtrack appearances are Knock Knock (2018), Death Wish (2018), and Thankgiving (2023).

Susie Rose Major sang lead on "Rainbow Eyes"; her group, Facedown, provided "Touch Me," "High School Boys," "Watch Me Rock" and "Can't Kill Rock 'n Roll" to the soundtrack. Later in her career, Major provided guest-lead vocals to Quint. Fronted by ex-actor Robbie Rist, best known as "Cousin Oliver" from the early-1970s American TV-comedy series The Brady Bunch, Major's Quint songs appeared in the SyFy Channel's Sharknado film series. She also fronts the Aeromsith tribute band, Rag Dolls.

"Soul Searcher" was performed by Eyes. Eyes formed out of the ashes of Satyr with bassist Chuck Wright (ex-Rough Cutt, Quiet Riot, Greg Guiffria's House of Lords); Satyr without Wright became Eyes. In 1982, Eyes self-released a private press, four-song, 12-inch EP, Call. According to the Discogs database of audio recordings, the album is classified as "electronic," "new wave," and "synth-pop." The album was digitally reissued on January 24, 2025, to streaming platforms."Living for the Beat" from the EP was featured in "Ghost Pointe Blank" from the Paramount+ TV series, School Spirits (S2:E6).

Riba Meryl, who co-wrote "Rainbow Eyes" with Sorcery's Richard Taylor, became an actress and portrayed "Janis Joplin" in the speculative 1984 rock 'n' roll conspiracy flick Down on Us. She later co-wrote "Brand New Start" to a 1987 crime drama, The Jigsaw Murders. In addition to Down on Us, Meryl acted in the syndicated television series, Throb, and the film, Banzai Runner.

The Rocktober Blood soundtrack was re-released in September 2015 by Lunaris Records.

=== Track listing ===
Side one
No.	Title	Performed by	Length
1.	"I'm Back"	Sorcery feat. Nigel Benjamin	4:04
2.	"Rainbow Eyes"	Sorcery feat. Susie Rose Major	3:30
3.	"Killer On the Loose"	Sorcery feat. Nigel Benjamin	4:10
4.	"kcaB m'I"	Sorcery feat. Susie Rose Major	4:10
5.	"Watching You"	Sorcery feat. Nigel Benjamin	3:56

Side two
No.	Title	Performed by	Length
1.	"Watch Me Rock"	Facedown	3:41
2.	"Touch Me"	Facedown	3:13
3.	"High School Boys"	Facedown	4:27
4.	"Can't Kill Rock and Roll"	Facedown	3:25
5.	"Soul Searcher"	Eyes	4:00

=== Personnel ===
Sorcery

- Richard Taylor – lead guitar
- Lon Cohen – rhythm guitar
- Richie King – bass
- Perry Morris – drums

Facedown

- Susie Major – vocals
- Paul Bennette – guitars
- Michael Zionch – bass
- Barry Brant – drums

Eyes

- Nigel Benjamin – vocals
- Bob Steffan – guitars
- John Telsco – bass
- Pat Reagen – keyboards
- Richard Onri – drums

Production

- Ben Sebastian – production
- Ferd Sebastian – production, design
- Kevin Eddy – engineer
- Larry Brown – engineer
