= The Mutilator =

1984 American slasher film by Buddy Cooper

- Theatrical release poster
- Directed by: Buddy Cooper; John S. Douglass
- Written by: Buddy Cooper
- Produced by: Buddy Cooper
- Starring: Matt Mitler; Bill Hitchcock; Ruth Martinez; Connie Rogers; Morey Lampley; Frances Raines
- Cinematography: Peter Schnall
- Edited by: Stephen Mack
- Music by: George Michaels
- Production company: OK Productions
- Distributed by: Ocean King Releasing
- Release dates: January 6, 1984 (Raleigh, North Carolina); October 5, 1984 (Newport News); January 4, 1985 (New York City); September 27, 1985 (Los Angeles)
- Running time: 86 minutes
- Country: United States
- Language: English
- Budget: $1 million

The Mutilator (originally titled Fall Break) is a 1984 American slasher film written, directed and produced by Buddy Cooper, and co-directed by John S. Douglass. The plot follows a group of college students who travel to an island property during fall break and are stalked and murdered by one of the students' fathers.

== Plot ==
A mother prepares a cake for her husband Big Ed’s birthday. In the adjacent room, their son Ed attempts to clean his father’s hunting rifle to surprise him but accidentally fires it. The bullet passes through the wall, striking and killing Ed’s mother. Upon returning home, Big Ed discovers his wife's body, causing him to suffer a break from reality and beat a terrified Ed.

Years later, Ed, now in college, is asked by his father to close up the family's beachfront condominium in Atlantic Beach, North Carolina, primarily used by the latter as something of a clubhouse for himself and his hunting partners. Ed's friends, Linda, Mike, Ralph, Sue, and Pam, eager for something to do over fall break, accompany him. Unbeknownst to the group, Big Ed is waiting for them in the basement of the condominium and plans to kill his son. Ed and his friends soon arrive.

Over the course of the night, Big Ed murders Ed's friends one by one, drowning Linda in the pool, cutting Mike open with a boat motor, decapitating a police officer, impaling Ralph with a flounder gig, and gutting Sue with a large fishing gaff, storing their bodies in the condominium's basement.

When Ed and Pam stumble upon the remains of Big Ed's victims, they notice him approaching and hide. Ed is ultimately found by his father, who stabs him in the leg but is unable to kill him. Pam intervenes, stabbing Big Ed. Big Ed attacks the two again. Pam is able to start the car and use it to drive him into a concrete wall, cutting him in half.

As Big Ed lies dying, police arrive on the scene, and a deputy has his leg cut off by Big Ed before he succumbs to his injuries. The movie ends with Ed and Pam at the hospital, seemingly recovering from their ordeal.

== Cast ==
- Matt Mitler as Ed Jr.
  - Trace Cooper as Young Ed Jr.
- Ruth Martinez as Pam
- Bill Hitchcock as Ralph
- Connie Rogers as Sue
- Frances Raines as Linda
- Morey Lampley as Mike
- Jack Chatham as Ed Sr.
- Bennie Moore as Cop
- Pamela Weddle Cooper as Mother
- John Bode as Deputy at Wall

== Release ==
The film was originally titled Fall Break. According to writer and co-director Cooper, the MPAA originally wanted to assign the film an X-rating, which the filmmakers rejected due to its association with pornography. Contemporaneous newspaper reports show that The Mutilator screened in Raleigh, North Carolina, as Fall Break beginning January 6, 1984. By October 5, 1984 the title had changed to The Mutilator, opening under that title in Newport News, Virginia. In January 1985, the film opened in New York City, (Note: Publications such as New York Magazine list showtimes for the film beginning the weekend of Friday, January 4, 1985.) but when the distributor tried to book screenings in middle American theaters, they were unable to secure advertising or screenings because it did not have an R-rating. At this point, Cooper relented and edited the film to the MPAA's specifications. It was re-released theatrically later in the year in Los Angeles on September 27, 1985.

=== Home media ===
The Mutilator was released in 1985 on VHS, Betamax and LaserDisc by Vestron Video in both R-rated and unrated versions.

VIPCO released the film on DVD in the United Kingdom, although cut by seven seconds, and Dragon Entertainment released the film uncut in Germany. Director Buddy Cooper has stated that these releases are unauthorized.

Arrow Video announced that they would release the film on Blu-ray in both the U.K. and the U.S. on September 29, 2015, which would have marked the first legitimate high definition release in both territories. In November 2015, the company announced they had delayed the release after they found a fully uncut 35 mm print of the film held at the U.S. Library of Congress. It was released on February 16, 2016.

== Reception ==
=== Critical response ===
Patrick Goldstein of the Los Angeles Times criticized the film upon its theatrical release, deeming it "a dull, amateurish shocker whose most striking characteristic is its complete lack of any ideas, good or otherwise." Variety called it "a boring horror film, designed strictly for fans of explicit gore."

Jeremy Wheeler of AllMovie praised The Mutilator's level of gore but criticized every other aspect of it, noting, "With effects echoing early Tom Savini, the killings in The Mutilator are not only gratuitous, but sickeningly ingenious in that blood-red sort of way. It hearkens back to a time when the real stars of horror cinema were the effects, with each kill representing a new creative challenge for the makeup maestros. Yes, the acting is horrible and no, it does nothing to further the genre, but those should be the last reasons to catch this flick."

Similar sentiments are shared by Hysteria Lives! Oh, the Horror! stated that, despite the amateurishness of the production, The Mutilator is "one of those slashers that works despite itself," and "falls right in line with other slashers who unwittingly mix inanity and violence in a manner that impossibly works." TV Guide awarded the film one out of five stars, noting that the performances are "all substandard, even for this sort of trash."

In a retrospective, Chris Coffel of Bloody Disgusting praised the film, writing, "The Mutilator contains all the classic slasher tropes. A group of horny, drunk college kids head out for a booze filled weekend of sex. Instead of a cabin in the woods, they go to a condo on a beach. Despite this, the film has something very fresh and original to it." Film scholar Jim Harper notes in his book Legacy of Blood: A Comprehensive Guide to Slasher Movies, "Although not a gore classic, The Mutilator is bloodthirsty enough to keep gorehounds happy, and just interesting enough to keep hold of viewers through the slow parts."

== Sequel ==
On December 23, 2021, it was revealed a sequel was in development. Filming ended in June 2022. The film was accidentally released onto Amazon Prime Video in early August 2025, ahead of its original release date on September 2.

== Sources ==
- Albright, Brian (2012). Regional Horror Films, 1958–1990: A State-by-State Guide with Interviews. Jefferson, North Carolina: McFarland. ISBN 978-1-476-60042-0.
- Harper, Jim (2004). Legacy of Blood: A Comprehensive Guide to Slasher Movies. London: Critical Vision. ISBN 978-1-900-48639-2.
- Normanton, Peter (2012). The Mammoth Book of Slasher Movies.
