= Dominick Muzio =

American singer-songwriter

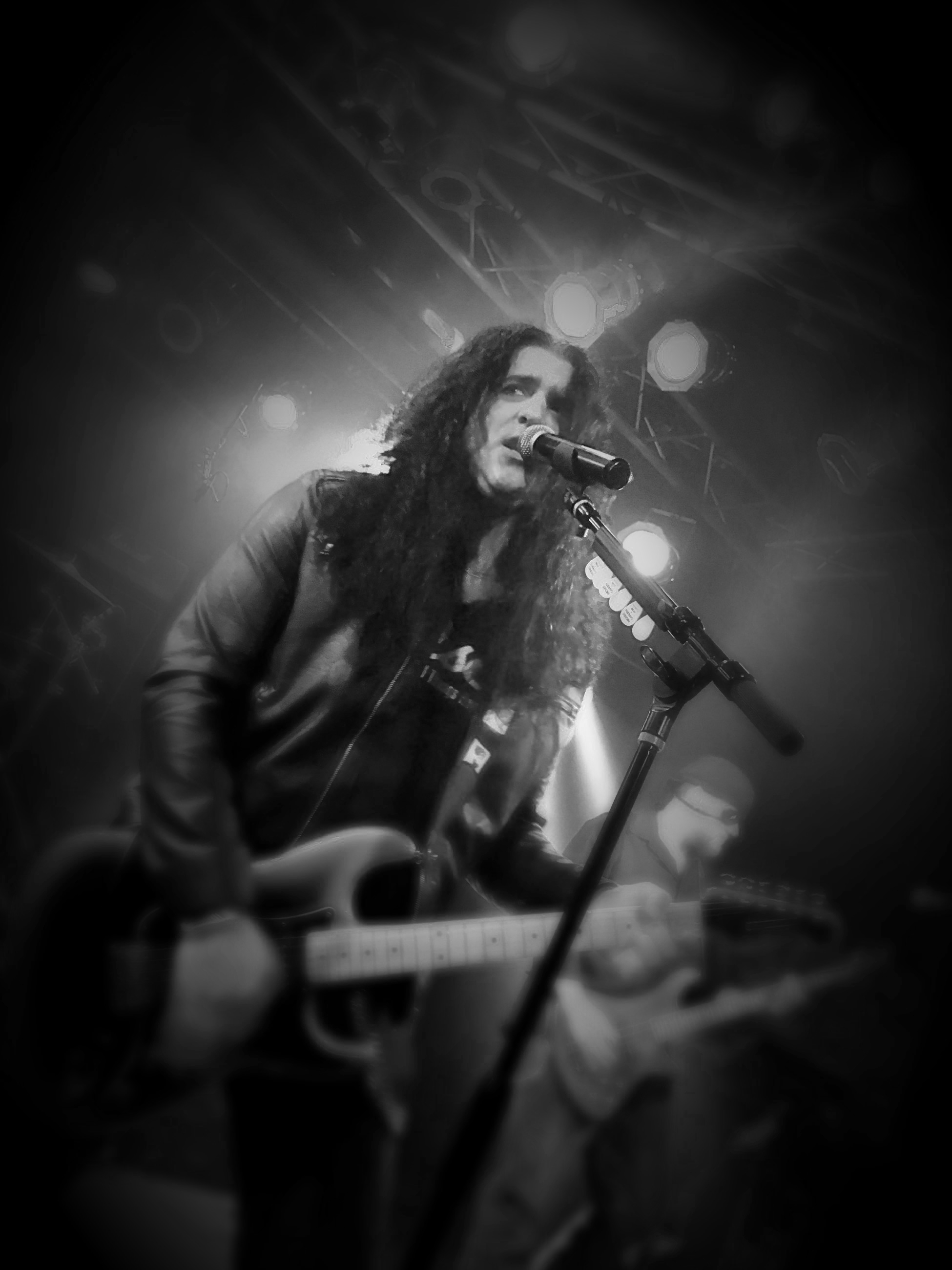
- Dominick Muzio performing with Wicked Garden at Count's Vamp'd in Las Vegas, NV, August 2016

Background information
- Born: Dominick Muzio; May 5, 1975 (age 51); Brooklyn, New York, U.S.
- Genres: Heavy metal, hard rock, grunge, Alternative
- Occupations: Singer-songwriter, musician, writer, actor
- Instruments: Vocals, guitar, bass guitar, drums, piano, keyboards, harmonica

Dominick Muzio (born May 5, 1975) is an American singer-songwriter, musician, writer, and actor. He was born in Brooklyn, New York.

== Career ==
Dominick began performing as 'Little Elvis' at the age of 5 in the Catskills resorts in upstate New York. By 1990, at age 15, he became the lead singer for New York City band Lynx. Lynx released one independent record with Big Mouth Records in 1991 which received heavy airplay in the east coast markets. Lynx played many sold out shows while on tour in the tri-state area with the likes of Type O Negative, Quiet riot, Ron "Bumblefoot" Thal (Guns N' Roses), and Ace Frehley and Peter Criss (Kiss); Frehley even expressed an interest in producing the band. Lynx often performed in front of up to 5,000 people, and Dominick quickly learned to control the crowd. This trait had many of the local fanzines name him "Best Frontman/Vocalist."

Lynx soon disbanded, and in 1993 Muzio formed Blues Messiah, releasing the single "Thick as a Brick." In 1995, he moved on to become the lead vocalist, songwriter, and guitarist for Hedonics. They released the CD "Original, Alternative, Mainstream, Sellout" on FDM Records in 1996, which featured three tracks produced by Ron "Bumblefoot" Thal. Hedonics had become very popular in the alternative/grunge scene and soon attracted attention from many major record labels, however but was unable to secure a deal due to a series of mergers, acquisitions and other turmoil in the music business.

The 1990s also found Dominick doing several music, acting, and voice over projects, including some for Sears, Kmart, and Radio Shack.

In the 2000s, Dominick performed vocals and guitar for an assortment of bands, including Flat Broke and Chemical Tribe. In 2007, Muzio appeared on the 2nd season of The World Series of Pop Culture on VH-1. He also published horror-themed short stories, including "Storage Space" in 2008.

He moved to Las Vegas in 2009, where he performed with many of the local bands. In 2013, he joined Wicked Garden as the lead vocalist and guitarist. The band is extremely popular within the local community. As a result of performing with Muscat's All Stars, which included Phil Lewis (L.A. Guns), Eric Stacy (Faster Pussycat), Les Warner (The Cult), Nadir D'Priest (London), and more, Muzio was invited to join London in 2016. Dominick has since put out a solo EP and now heads up a reworked version of Chemical Tribe which has an album coming out in 2026

Dominick co-hosted the ZrockR Live radio show. He has been a contributing writer for their magazine since 2015, interviewing many musicians, including Todd Kerns (Sin City Sinners, Slash, The Age of Electric, The Anti-Stars), Frank DiMino (Angel), Bobby Gustafson (Overkill), and Phil Lewis (L.A. Guns). Keeping his writing skills sharp, he writes the column "Going Wood: How to fail in the music business without really trying"

== Awards ==
Dominick was named "Sin City Shredder" by Sin City Presents Magazine in December 2016. In 2016, Wicked Garden, in which Muzio is the lead vocalist and guitarist, won Las Vegas Weekly's Readers' Choice Best Cover Band.The band won the award again in 2017.
