= Lizzie Grey =

American guitarist (1958–2019)

- Born: Stephen Perry; August 13, 1958; Los Angeles County, California, U.S.
- Died: August 5, 2019 (aged 60) Las Vegas, Nevada, U.S.
- Genres: Glam rock, glam metal, heavy metal, hard rock
- Occupation: Guitarist
- Years active: 1978–2019

Stephen M. Perry (August 13, 1958 – August 5, 2019), who used the stage name Lizzie Grey, was an American musician. He is perhaps best known for his membership as a guitarist in the heavy metal band London and for co-writing the Mötley Crüe song "Public Enemy #1". From 1990 until his death in 2019, he performed with the glam rock band Spiders & Snakes.

== Career ==
Perry was the guitarist for the band Sister with Blackie Lawless and Nikki Sixx in the mid-to-late 1970s. Thereafter he formed the band London with Nikki Sixx, drummer Dane Rage, keyboardist John St. John and lead vocalist Michael White. Followed shortly thereafter by lead vocalist Henri Valentine, who was later replaced by Nigel Benjamin, formerly of Mott. The band garnered a following of glam rock fans from the late 1970s, spearheaded by Rodney Bingenheimer and Kim Fowley. Differences arose between Nikki Sixx and Nigel Benjamin, and the band finally broke up. Grey and fellow London member Dane Rage went on to form the band Roxy Roller with female Canadian vocalist Leslie Knauer, also known from the bands Promises and Precious Metal, and Randy St. Clair. Roxy Roller, a "glitter pop" band released one single, a cover of Cole Porter's song "Anything Goes".

Shortly afterward there was a revision of the band London featuring vocalist Nadir D'Priest, which recorded internationally recognized albums and was featured in the movie The Decline of Western Civilization Part II: The Metal Years. This version of London continued until the late 1980s, when Lizzie decided to take over his own lead vocals, forming the band Ultra Pop which was heavily influenced by the band T-Rex, with Vince Votel, Ernie Machado and Chris Solberg. Ultra Pop changed its name to Spiders & Snakes in 1990 with the addition of drummer Timothy Jay.

Spiders & Snakes made several recordings beginning in the 1990s. In 2000, just after the release of the album London Daze, bassist Leigh Lawson died. During this brief split in the band membership, Lizzie explored musical endeavors with various bands in Arizona before returning to Los Angeles to carry on the legacy of Spiders & Snakes, until his retirement in 2017, where the band remains to this day with current members Chris Sheridan, Phil St. Vincent and Timothy Jay.

== Personal life ==
Grey's maternal uncle was radio commentator Wally George, and he was the cousin of actress Rebecca De Mornay.

On the morning of August 5, 2019, Grey died from Lewy Body disease after being diagnosed with it 11 years prior.

== Discography ==
=== London ===
- Non-Stop Rock (1985)
- Don't Cry Wolf (1986)

=== Ultra Pop ===
- Ultra Pop (1989)
- Adventures In Fantasy (1990)

=== Spiders & Snakes ===
- Arachnomania (1991)
- Arachno 2 (1992)
- 2000 Retro (1993)
- Oddities: The Glitter Years (1995)
- Astropop (1997)
- London Daze (2000)
- Hollywood Ghosts (2005)
- Melodrama (2007)
- Year of the Snake (2014)
