= Sister (American band) =

American heavy metal band

- Origin: Los Angeles, California, U.S.
- Genres: Heavy metal
- Years active: 1976–1978
- Spinoffs: London
- Past members: Blackie Lawless; Lizzie Grey; Nikki Sixx; Dane Rage

Sister was an American heavy metal band formed in Los Angeles in 1976. Though the band was only together for approximately two years and never achieved any measure of success, after its breakup ex-members Blackie Lawless and Nikki Sixx found international success with the bands W.A.S.P. and Mötley Crüe respectively. Lawless had previously played guitar with the New York Dolls as a substitute for Johnny Thunders for a handful of live commitments following his departure in 1975.

== Overview ==
Though the band never officially released any material, Sister has obtained some measure of notoriety for pioneering the fusion of occult symbology such as the pentagram with a theatrical heavy metal performance inspired by Alice Cooper. The band had the misfortune of existing in a time when heavy metal had yet to become commercially viable (though that would change significantly in the coming years) and personal differences caused the band to break up in 1978.

Upon the breakup of Sister, bassist Nikki Sixx and guitarist Lizzie Grey formed the band London, a band that Lawless would soon join as well. London has become well known for having several members in its ranks during its three-year existence who would go on to major success later in the 1980s, such as Sixx, Lawless, Izzy Stradlin, and Fred Coury. Future Guns N' Roses drummer Steven Adler auditioned for London but was turned down.

== Band members ==
Former members

- Blackie Lawless – vocals, rhythm guitar
- Randy Piper – guitar, vocals
- Joey Palermo – bass, vocals
- Jimy Image – drums
- Lizzie Grey – guitar
- Nikki Sixx – bass
- Dane Rage – drums

== Discography ==
1. Demo 1977
2. Demo 1979
