= Non-Stop Rock =

Studio album by London
- Released: September 28, 1985
- Recorded: Sound City Studios, Van Nuys, Los Angeles
- Genre: Glam metal
- Length: 31:14
- Label: Shrapnel
- Producer: London

London chronology
Non-Stop Rock (1985)	Don't Cry Wolf (1986)

Professional ratings
Review scores
Source	Rating
AllMusic	2/5 stars
Kerrang!	2/5 stars
Sounds	4/5 stars

Non-Stop Rock is the first studio album by the American glam metal band London, released in 1985 by Shrapnel Records.

The riff during the intro to the song "Radio Stars" is taken from the song "Too Fast for Love" by Mötley Crüe.

The album is slated for reissue in 2017.

== Track listing ==
Side one

1. "Dirty City" (Lizzie Grey, Nadir D'Priest, Brian West) - 2:39
2. "Non-Stop Rock" (Grey, D'Priest, Bobby Marks) - 3:39
3. "Werewolves in London" (Grey, D'Priest) - 4:36
4. "It's Rock & Roll" (Grey) - 3:59
5. "Stand Back" (Grey, Marks, D'Priest, West) - 2:37

Side two

6. "No Tell Motel" (Grey, West, D'Priest) - 3:13
7. "Party in Hollywood" (Grey, D'Priest) - 3:00
8. "Masters of the Airwaves" (Grey, D'Priest) - 4:00
9. "Radio Stars" (Grey) - 3:31

== Personnel ==
=== Band members ===
- Nadir D'Priest - vocals
- Lizzie Grey - guitars
- Brian West - bass
- Bobby Marks - drums

=== Additional Musicians ===
- Peter Szucs - keyboards on track 3
- Fred Coury - drums (on LP sleeve but did not play on the album)

=== Production ===
- Bret Newman - engineer, mixing on tracks 2, 3, 5, 7
- Steve Fontano - mixing
