= Breeders (1986 film) =

1986 film by Tim Kincaid

- Theatrical release poster
- Directed by: Tim Kincaid
- Written by: Tim Kincaid
- Produced by: Cynthia De Paula
- Starring: Teresa Farley; Lance Lewman; Frances Raines; Natalie O'Connell; Amy Brentano
- Cinematography: Arthur D. Marks
- Edited by: Barry Zetlin
- Music by: Don Great; Tom Milano
- Distributed by: Empire Pictures
- Release date: May 1, 1986
- Running time: 77 minutes
- Country: United States
- Language: English

Breeders is a 1986 science fiction erotic horror film directed by Tim Kincaid, and stars Teresa Farley, Lance Lewman and Frances Raines.

A remake was released in 1997 under both the same title and Deadly Instincts.

== Plot ==
When five Manhattan women, all virgins, are accosted under mysterious circumstances, the police think they have a twisted serial rapist on their hands. But as NYPD Detective Dale Androtti (Lance Lewman) and Dr. Gamble Pace (Teresa Farley) soon discover, the reality is much worse. Tracing the source of the attacks underground, they find an unstoppable alien presence that has infested an abandoned subway system and begun to reproduce itself by impregnating human women.

== Cast ==
- Teresa Yvon Farley as Dr. Gamble Pace
- Lance Lewman as Detective Dale Andriotti
- Frances Raines as Karinsa Marshall
- Natalie O'Connell as Donna
- Amy Brentano as Gail
- LeeAnne Baker as Kathleen
- Matt Mitler as Ted

== Release ==
The film was given a limited release theatrically in the United States by Empire Pictures in May 1986. It was subsequently released on VHS by Wizard Video.

The film was officially released on DVD by MGM in 2001.

== Production ==
Tim Kincaid first encountered Charles Band at the American Film Market and attempted to sell his independently produced film Bad Girls Dormitory. While Band ultimately passed on acquiring Bad Girls Dormitory, he did tell Kincaid to show him any future projects he was developing. Upon his return to New York, Kinccaid and his wife/producer Cynthia DePaula went over the various projects they'd developed and sent the material to Band who invited the two back to California with band acquiring Rapists from Outer Space (which would eventually become Breeders) and Mutant Hunt which would be shot back-to-back. According to Kincaid, both he and his wife worked to ensure the women in the film were properly compensated due to the amount of nudity required for the film and also worked to ensure they weren't brutalized on camera with most of the actual rape scenes being implied rather than explicit. The scenes depicting the underground lair of the monster were shot in the catacombs of the Brooklyn Bridge upon suggestion by make-up artist Ed French who'd done effects work for C.H.U.D. which had previously used the location. For the climax involving the women immersed in a pool of translucent slime, the production initially used gelatin, but once the disrobed actresses entered the pool it failed to obtain a gelatinous state. As Kincaid didn't want to risk harming the girls by introducing chemicals to assist the gelling process, Director of Photography Arthur D. Marks ran to the nearest supermarket and acquired 10 pounds of flour which did work in attaining the gelatinous state the production needed, but also caused the pool to take on an appearance and consistency similar to seminal fluid giving the scene sexual undertones that according to Kincaid were purely unintentional.

Breeders was the first film from Empire International Pictures to be distributed direct-to-video. Charles Band said as Empire continued to grow it became necessary to pick up outside productions in order to meet demand and admitted involvement in Breeders and other films of its ilk may have been a mistake in hindsight. Prior to working on Breeders, director Kincaid had been better known as a pornographic director.

== Reception ==
Critical reception for the film has been negative. TV Guide panned the film, criticizing the film's acting, dialogue, and effects. Valeriy Kolyadych from PopMatters gave the film 2/10 stars, calling it "unashamedly exploitative" and criticized the film's acting, dialogue, and finale.
