= 1950s in film =

The decade of the 1950s in film involved many significant films.

== Trends ==
Films of the 1950s were of a wide variety. As a result of the introduction of television, the studios and companies sought to put audiences back in theaters. They used more techniques in presenting their films through widescreen and big-approach methods, such as Cinemascope, VistaVision, and Cinerama, as well as gimmicks like 3-D film. Big production and spectacle films were perfect for this gained popularity, with the many historic and fantasy epics like The Robe (1953),The Story of Robin Hood and His Merrie Men (1952), The Ten Commandments (1956), The Seventh Voyage of Sinbad (1958), and Ben-Hur (1959). Other big-scoped films thrived internationally, too, such as Soviet fantasy director Aleksandr Ptushko's mythological epics Sadko, Ilya Muromets, and Sampo, and Japanese director Akira Kurosawa's historic Seven Samurai, Throne of Blood, and Rashomon. Toshiro Mifune, who starred in those Kurosawa films, also starred in the color spectacle Samurai Trilogy.

This spectacle approach, coupled with Cold War paranoia, a renewed interest in science from the atomic bomb, as well as increased interest in the mysteries of outer space and other forteana, lent itself well to what this film decade is best known for, science fiction. The science fiction genre began its golden age during this decade with such notable films as The Day the Earth Stood Still (1951), The Thing from Another World (1951), The War of the Worlds (1953), It Came from Outer Space (1953), Creature from the Black Lagoon (1954), Them! (1954), This Island Earth (1955), Earth vs. the Flying Saucers (1956), and Forbidden Planet (1956), as well as Japanese science fiction tokusatsu films. There were also Earth-based "sci-fi" subjects, including kaiju films such as the Godzilla series as well as 20,000 Leagues Under the Sea (1954) and When Worlds Collide (1951). Companies such as American International Pictures, Japan's Toho, and Britain's Hammer Film Productions were created to solely produce films of the fantastique genres.

The decade was equally adept at both character and realistic films. The highly noted actors James Stewart, John Wayne, and Marlon Brando were at the peak of their popularity. Stewart, starring in Winchester '73, and Wayne, starring in John Ford's Cavalry Trilogy and The Searchers, revitalized the western. Brando mastered versatile roles in films such as A Streetcar Named Desire, The Wild One (1953), Julius Caesar, On the Waterfront (1954), Guys and Dolls (1955), The Teahouse of the August Moon (1956), and Sayonara (1957).

Director Alfred Hitchcock was at the peak of his craft, with films such as Strangers on a Train (1951), Dial M for Murder (1954), Rear Window (1954), To Catch a Thief (1955), The Man Who Knew Too Much (1956), Vertigo (1958), and North by Northwest (1959), with James Stewart and Grace Kelly starring in three each.

In Latin America, the decade marked a generational shift. The Golden Age of Argentine cinema, which had dominated Spanish-language markets since the late 1930s, entered a terminal crisis when the military government that overthrew Perón in 1955 eliminated film subsidies and the studio system collapsed; by 1957, only fifteen national films were released, the lowest figure since the industry's founding. The creation of the National Institute of Cinematography in 1957 and the emergence of directors such as Leopoldo Torre Nilsson laid the groundwork for a new wave of filmmakers in the early 1960s. Meanwhile, the Golden Age of Mexican cinema reached its artistic and commercial peak, with directors such as Emilio Fernández and cinematographer Gabriel Figueroa gaining international recognition.

The Bengali Indian director Satyajit Ray, who began his career in the 1950s, was also at the peak of his career during this decade, with films such as The Apu Trilogy (1955–1959), Jalsaghar (1958), and Parash Pathar (1958).

== Lists of films ==
- 1950 in film
- 1951 in film
- 1952 in film
- 1953 in film
- 1954 in film
- 1955 in film
- 1956 in film
- 1957 in film
- 1958 in film
- 1959 in film

== See also ==
- Film, History of film, Lists of films

== External lists ==
- List of 1950s films at IMDb
- List of 1950s deaths at IMDb
- List of 1950s births at IMDb
