= AC/DC: Let There Be Rock =

1980 AC/DC concert film

- Theatrical release poster
- Directed by: Eric Dionysius; Eric Mistler
- Produced by: Eric Dionysius; Eric Mistler
- Starring: Bon Scott; Angus Young; Malcolm Young; Cliff Williams; Phil Rudd
- Cinematography: Jean-Francis Gondre
- Edited by: Mariette Lévy-Novion
- Music by: AC/DC
- Production companies: High Speed Productions; Sebastian International
- Distributed by: Warner Bros. Pictures
- Release dates: 1 September 1980 (United Kingdom and France); 14 September 1980 (United States); 31 December 1981 (Australia)
- Running time: 99 minutes
- Countries: United States; France
- Language: English

AC/DC: Let There Be Rock is a 1980 concert film featuring the Australian hard rock band AC/DC, released theatrically in September 1980 (and AC/DC's native Australia on New Year's Eve, 1981) and on videotape the same year.

== Overview ==
AC/DC: Let There Be Rock was filmed on 9 December 1979 at the Pavillon de Paris in Paris, France. It also contains interviews with members of the band, including vocalist Bon Scott, who died the following February.

During an interview with JA Kerswell of the UK publication, Hysteria Lives!, independent filmmaker Ferd Sebastian recalled, with his son Tracy's encouragement, he imported the French-made rock documentary about the Australian band, which played as a "midnight movie" in theaters across the United States.

"My first punk rock moment was going to see the AC/DC movie, Let There Be Rock," recalled Dave Grohl. "It was the first time I'd felt that energy; like, I just wanna fuckin' break something. I'm so excited that I'm losing my mind! It was dirty and sweaty. Fuckin' beautiful."

The film was rereleased as a Blu-ray/DVD double pack – with a collector's tin, concert pictures, a souvenir guitar pick, and a 32-page booklet – and as individual Blu-ray and DVD sets on 7 June 2011. Only 90,000 of the collectors' tins were made, each labeled with a number out of 90,000 on the base.

Though it shares a name with AC/DC's fourth studio album, Let There Be Rock, the movie includes songs from T.N.T., Powerage, and Highway to Hell. The movie's poster and videotape package featured cover art similar to that on the most widely distributed editions of the Let There Be Rock album.

In 1997, an expanded audio recording of the concert was released on CD as Let There Be Rock: The Movie – Live in Paris, on discs 2 and 3 of the Bonfire box set. In addition to the 13 tracks included in the movie, the CD contains the live version of "T.N.T." (which was played between "Rocker" and "Let There Be Rock").

== Track listing ==
1. "Live Wire" - 5:23 (1975)
2. "Shot Down in Flames" - 3:18 (1979)
3. "Hell Ain't a Bad Place to Be" - 3:54 (1977)
4. "Sin City" - 3:52 (1978)
5. "Walk All Over You" - 2:30 (1979)
6. "Bad Boy Boogie" - 11:08 (1977)
7. "The Jack" - 5:21 (1975)
8. "Highway to Hell" - 3:10 (1979)
9. "Girls Got Rhythm" - 3:09 (1979)
10. "High Voltage" - 5:27 (1975)
11. "Whole Lotta Rosie" - 4:41 (1977)
12. "Rocker" - 8:57 (1975)
13. "Let There Be Rock" - 7:17 (1977)

All songs composed by Angus Young, Malcolm Young, and Bon Scott.

== Personnel ==
- Bon Scott – lead vocals
- Angus Young – lead guitar
- Malcolm Young – rhythm guitar, backing vocals
- Cliff Williams – bass, backing vocals
- Phil Rudd – drums

== Crew ==
- Eric Dionysius – director, producer
- Eric Mistler – director, producer
- Jean-Francis Gondre – cinematography
- Mariette Lévy-Novion – film
- Martine Cuisinier – executive producer
- Mike Scarfe – sound (MHA Audio)
- Terry Lee – special effects (lightning)
- Klaus Blasquiz – visual effects (graphics)
- Jacques Dimier – visual effects (animation)

== Reception ==
The film drew mixed reviews from critics. Variety wrote that it was notable for being "shot, for the most part, from above or on the stage – as opposed to upwards, in the pit in front of the stage, as is the case with so many rock concert films. This gives the hard rock audience which goes repeatedly to Led Zeppelin or Pink Floyd concert films a chance to see rock from a new angle ... Visually, lead guitarist Angus Young, in his short pants and schoolboy's uniform, proves to be one of the most original and theatrical rock performers to come by in years. His crazy, careening dances across the stage are, along with the photography, the only elements that separate this production from so many other rock films." Richard Harrington of The Washington Post echoed Variety's review, writing that the film "offers few insights into the workings of the band, but then its aim is as true as it is low. Mercifully avoiding superfluous crowd shots, directors Eric Dionysius and Eric Mistler have come up with some distinctive camera angles. Most of the film is shot high on the lip of the stage (only a foot or two from the band) or from a high moving dolly that provides a new performance perspective – rock from the top."

Stephen Holden of The New York Times wrote a negative review of the film, calling it "a dull, cheaply made concert film that should appeal only to diehard fans of the hugely popular Australian rock quintet." Holden described the band members' responses in the interview segments as "almost invariably so garbled – apparently by drunkenness – as to be virtually unintelligible." Ed Naha of the New York Post also disliked the film, writing: "AC/DC is one of the most exciting hard rock bands around, although you'd never know it from this movie. Basically, it's a 'let's set up, let's drink, let's play, let's play some more' flick that never really tells you much about the band except that they seem high a lot and have a hard time keeping their pants up onstage ... The moviegoer is truly lucky if more than one figure is in focus in any given scene. The much hyped 'Wall of Sound' in-theater stereo system should have been tagged 'Wall of Noise' instead. The music comes off loud and muddy and the vocals are reduced to indecipherable whines." Journalist Mark Putterford called the film "a double-edged sword: on the one hand the live footage is excellent, showing AC/DC at very near their best; on the other, the off stage interviews with each member are at best amateurish, at worst downright embarrassing."

"A big rock 'n' roll moment for me as a teenager was going to see AC/DC's Let There Be Rock movie," Dave Grohl told Q. "That was the first time I heard music that made me want to break shit... After the first number in that movie, that was maybe the first moment in my life where I really felt like a punk. I just wanted to tear that movie theatre to shreds."

== Certifications ==
Region	Certification	Certified units/sales
United Kingdom (BPI)	Platinum	50,000^{^}
^{^} Shipments figures based on certification alone.
