= Don't Cry Wolf (album) =

Studio album by London
- Released: August 2, 1986
- Recorded: Monterey Studios, California
- Genre: Glam metal
- Length: 36:22
- Label: Metalhead
- Producer: Kim Fowley

London chronology
Non-Stop Rock (1985)	Don't Cry Wolf (1986)	Playa Del Rock (1990)

Professional ratings
Review scores
Source	Rating
Crash	4/6

Don't Cry Wolf was the second album by American hard rock band London, released in 1986.

The song "For Whom the Bell Tolls" was co-written by Blackie Lawless, he later recorded his own version with W.A.S.P., featured on the album The Headless Children.

"Oh! Darling" is a cover of The Beatles song.

The album was remastered and reissued in 2014.

== Track listing ==
1. "Drop the Bomb" (West, D'Priest)
2. "Set Me Free" (Grey, D'Priest)
3. "Hit and Run Lover" (Grey, D'Priest)
4. "Under the Gun" (West, D'Priest)
5. "Oh! Darling" (The Beatles cover)
6. "Fast as Light" (West, Grey, D'Priest)
7. "Put Out the Fire" (West, Grey, D'Priest)
8. "Killing Time" (Grey, D'Priest)
9. "We Want Everything" (West, Grey, D'Priest)
10. "For Whom the Bell Tolls" (Blackie Lawless, Grey, D'Priest)

== Band members ==
- Nadir D'Priest - vocals
- Lizzie Grey - guitar
- Brian West - bass
- Wailin' J. Morgan - drums

=== Additional Musicians ===
- David Carr - keyboards
