= Running Cool =

- Directed by: Ferd Sebastian; Beverly Sebastian
- Written by: Ferd Sebastian; Beverly Sebastian
- Produced by: Ferd Sebastian; Beverly Sebastian
- Release date: 1993
- Country: United States
- Language: English
- Budget: $2.5 million

Running Cool is a 1993 American film from Beverly Sebastian and Ferd Sebastian. It is their last feature film, and their 13th film overall, in a career that began in 1968 with I Need.

The film was shot in Citrus County, a community north of Tampa and northwest of Orlando, Florida. The budget was $2.5 million. Filming took place in 1991.

Ferd Sebastian explained to Victoria White of The Tampa Bay Times on April 16, 1993, that Running Cool was their most "messagey" movie, yet.

In 1999, Sebastian explained to the online publication Mondo Stumpo that most of the cast and background actors, all of the bikers were friends; however although many were Christians [the bikers], they were not part of his (then active) ministry. He explained to The Tampa Times that Running Cool could have been made anywhere. "Instead of wetlands, we could have saved redwoods [the goal of the bikers], but [Beverly and I] just love it down here [in their new, adopted home away from Los Angeles, in the Tampa/St. Petersburg, Florida, area].

== Plot ==
Bone and Bear, two rough and tough bikers, ride out from Sturgis to the marshes of South Carolina to help out their buddy, Ironbutt Garrett, whose land is being eyed by the money-grubbing, domineering Calvin Hogg.

== Cast ==
- Andrew Divoff as Bone
- Bubba Baker as Bear
- Paul Gleason as Calvin Hogg
- James Gammon as Ironbutt Garrett
- Dedee Pfeiffer as Michelle
- Tracy Sebastian as Blue Hogg (son of Calvin)
- Jan Duncan, aka Jan Sebastian, as Marnie

Andrew Divoff is best known for playing the evil Djinn/Nathaniel Demerest in the first two Wishmaster films, from 1997 and 1999.

James Gammon became best known to U.S. audiences for his role as the retired longshoreman Nick Bridges on the CBS television crime drama Nash Bridges, from 1996 to 2001.

Paul Gleason is beloved for his role as Vice Principal Richard Vernon in The Breakfast Club (1985).

== Trivia ==
Ferd Sebastian explained to The Tampa Times the filmmakers put out a call for 200 biker extras . . . and 2000 showed up. The bikers all donated their pay to aid construction of the Central Florida Zoo's Eagle habitat in honor of the Sebastians.
