= Spiders & Snakes (band) =

American rock band

- Also known as: Ultra Pop (1988–1990)
- Origin: Los Angeles, California, U.S.
- Genres: Glam metal, hard rock
- Years active: 1988–2001, 2003–present
- Labels: Cleopatra, CPR, Sansei
- Members: Tim Yasui; Phil St. Vincent; Chris Sheridan
- Past members: Lizzie Grey Vince Votel Chris "Cupcake" Taylor Leigh Lawson Doug E. Sex Joe Petro Steven Christal Johnny G Anthony Castillo
- Website: spidersandsnakes.com

Spiders & Snakes is a Los Angeles–based glam metal/hard rock band fronted by ex-London co-founder Lizzie Grey until his death, and by former London drummer Tim Yasui (aka Timothy Jay). The band draws heavily from British glam rock of the 1970s and performs regularly on the Sunset Strip in West Hollywood and throughout the Los Angeles club scene.

== History ==
When Lizzie Grey left London in 1988, he made a conscious decision to return to his roots in 1970s British glam rock. Grey began a project under the name Ultra Pop to pursue this end, recording the first album, Ultra Pop (1988), largely as a solo effort. Kerrang! magazine critic Malcolm Dome gave the self-titled Ultra Pop album a 5-"K" review in 1988, after which Grey formed a band and began to tour under the "Ultra Pop" name with members Vince Votel, Chris "Cupcake" Taylor, and Ernie Machado. According to drummer Tim Yasui, "Ultra Pop borrowed their stage image from a combination of Stanley Kubrick's Clockwork Orange film and the Rocky Horror Picture Show."

Grey hired ex-London drummer Tim Yasui (stage name Timothy Jay) in late 1990 to replace departing drummer Ernie Machado during the writing of a third album, and decided to change the name of the project to "Spiders & Snakes" to reflect the heavier sound that Yasui brought the band, as well as to quell confusion and fan dissatisfaction the name "Ultra Pop" was creating. The name "Spiders & Snakes" is taken from the song of the same name by country/western artist Jim Stafford.

Under the name Spiders & Snakes, the band released two EPs, Arachnomania (1991) and Arachno 2 (1992), followed by the full-length album 2000 Retro (1993). The album's single "Lost for Words" reached number one on the import singles charts in Denmark in 1994. Leigh Lawson was added as bassist to the touring lineup in 1993 in support of the 1993–1994 tour for 2000 Retro.

Oddities: The Glitter Years was produced by Kim Fowley and released in 1995. Astro Pop (1997) was produced by Flipside magazine contributor Martin McMartin and former The Humpers guitarist Mark "Anarchy" Lee, who together went for a fast, punk rock-influenced sound with minimal production. According to Yasui, the album has become a fan favorite "because it does have that punk edge." The band adopted a silver spaceman look with silver makeup for this phase of the group.

Spiders and Snakes' album London Daze (2000)

In 1999, Spiders & Snakes' version of "Public Enemy #1" was chosen for inclusion in their Cleopatra Records' electro tribute to Mötley Crüe entitled Shout At the Remix; Spiders & Snakes' version was remixed by the British gothic rock group Rosetta Stone for the album. "Public Enemy #1" was originally written by Grey and performed by London; the song was subsequently recorded by Mötley Crüe and released on their debut album Too Fast for Love (1981). Cleopatra Records then signed Spiders & Snakes to their Deadline imprint, where they released London Daze in 2000. London Daze features rerecordings of songs that were recorded or played by Grey's and Yasui's previous band London. The most successful track on the album was the rerecording of "Public Enemy #1". According to Grey, the track received "a great deal of airplay both domestically and international[ly]." The album also includes three tracks from a 16-track demo recorded by London in 1980 featuring ex-Mott the Hoople vocalist Nigel Benjamin on vocals and Mötley Crüe bassist Nikki Sixx on bass.

One month after the release of London Daze, the band's bass player, Leigh Lawson, died. The band canceled their 2000 tour, and hired a friend of Yasui's named Joe Petro to replace Lawson. Late in 2001, Yasui and Petro teamed up with Jeff Duncan of Armored Saint and Odin and Happenin' Harry of The Haptones to form a one-off group named Forever Say Die!. This group recorded a cover of Black Sabbath's "Sabbath Bloody Sabbath" for Cleopatra Records' tribute album Evil Lives: A True Metal Tribute to Metal Tribute to Black Sabbath.

Spiders & Snakes began working on new material in 2004, initially as a duo consisting of Grey and Yasui. The two began recording in 2005 to lay down a song written by Yasui about the Bill Clinton/Monica Lewinsky scandal entitled "Bill's Cigar", but ended up recording more songs with the remaining studio time. The two then continued writing and recording more songs until they had enough material for an eleven-song album. The album was released as Hollywood Ghosts in 2005, and included a bonus DVD of videos covering the band's career dating back to 1990. Hollywood Ghosts featured four songs with Yasui on vocals, marking the first time Yasui ever sang lead vocals for the band. The band then signed to Big M.F./Zain Records in Japan, who released Hollywood Ghosts to the Japanese market in 2006. Initially, Grey and Yasui were performing an acoustic duo, but put together a band to tour for the Hollywood Ghosts album. The band rehired guitarist Doug E. Sex from the London Daze lineup, and added bass player Phil St. Vincent on bass.

During the summer of 2006, Spiders & Snakes were featured in a TV commercial sponsored by the California Department of Conservation's recycling program centered around a song entitled "Who Threw the Bottle in the Trash?" that eventually aired during the Super Bowl that same year. In 2007, Spiders & Snakes signed with Corporate Punishment Records, and released Melodrama, which, according to the band's website, attempted "to create an album on an independent budget in the spirit of Bob Ezrin's earlier efforts with Kiss and Alice Cooper."

In 2014, Spiders & Snakes released an album entitled Year of the Snake, which was recorded in 2013–2014 during the Chinese calendar Year of the Snake. The album features a cover of Angel's "I Ain't Gonna Eat Out My Heart Anymore", and guest appearances by Billy Sherwood of Yes, Angelo Moore of Fishbone, Rik Fox of W.A.S.P. and Steeler, Ryo Okumoto of Spock's Beard, and Betsy of Bitch, amongst others. The album was released by Sansei Records on October 28 in the United States, and will be released in Europe and Asia on December 9 by RSK Entertainment.

On October 29, the band released a video for the single "Kawasaki City" from Year of the Snake. The song and the video document and recreate a particularly memorable night the band spent at a rock nightclub called "Groupie Dolls" in Kawasaki, Japan. The track features vocals and songwriting by Tim Yasui.

Spiders & Snakes performed at the Whisky a Go Go in West Hollywood, California, on December 18, 2014. This the official record release party for Year Of The Snake and also a commemorative celebration of the 25th anniversary of the band's formation.

Lizzie Grey died in August 2019.

== Band members ==
Current members

- Timothy Jay (aka Tim Yasui), drums (1991–2001, since 2003)
- Phil St. Vincent, bass (since 2005)
- Chris Sheridan, guitar (since 2011)

Former members

- Lizzie Grey, guitar, vocals (1991-2001, 2003-2019, died August 2019)
- Vince Votel, bass (1991–1993)
- Chris "Cupcake" Taylor, guitar (1991)
- Leigh Lawson, bass (1993–2000, died August 2000)
- Doug E. Sex, guitar (2000–2001, 2005–2006)
- Joe Petro, bass (2000–2001)
- Steven Christal, guitar (1992–1993)
- Johnny G, guitar (1995–1997)
- Anthony Castillo, guitar (1997–1999)

As Spiders & Snakes AZ (2002–2003)

- Lizzie Grey, guitar, vocals
- Johnny Neptune, guitar, keyboards, vocals
- Marty Haviik, bass, vocals
- Mark Bolen, drums

As Ultra Pop

- Lizzie Grey, guitar, vocals (1988–1990)
- Vince Votel, bass (1989–1990)
- Chris "Cupcake" Solberg, guitar (1989–1990)
- Ernie Machado, drums (1989–1990)

== Discography ==
=== As Spiders & Snakes ===
- Arachnomania (1991) (EP)
- Arachno 2 (1992) (EP)
- 2000 Retro (1993)
- Oddities: The Glitter Years (1995)
- Astropop (1997)
- London Daze (2000)
- Hollywood Ghosts (2005) (CD/DVD set)
- Melodrama (2007) (CD/DVD set)
- Greatest Hits (2011) (compilation album)
- Glam Rock (2014) (compilation album)
- Year of the Snake (2014)

==== Compilations ====
- All that Glitters (1997)
- Shout At The Remix (1999)
- Hollywood Rocks! The Audio Companion (2005)

=== As Ultra Pop ===
- Ultra Pop (1988)
- Adventures in Fantasy (1989)
