= American Angels: Baptism of Blood =

- VHS cover
- Directed by: Beverly Sebastian; Ferd Sebastian
- Written by: Beverly Sebastian; Ferd Sebastian; Ben Sebastian
- Produced by: Beverly Sebastian; Ferd Sebastian; Ben Sebastian
- Release date: 1990
- Country: United States
- Language: English

American Angels: Baptism of Blood is a 1990 American film from Beverly Sebastian and Ferd Sebastian about female wrestlers. The movie was made for direct-to-cable subscription channels and cross-marketed to home video by Paramount Pictures.

== Plot ==
Jan Sebastian, aka Jan MacKenzie from 'Gator Bait II, stars as Lisa. She desires to become a professional wrestler like her idol, Killer Kane, actually her grandfather who retired after killing someone in the ring.

As "Luscious Lisa," she joins The American Angels, a female wrestling team . . . and has a championship match with the "Magnificent Mimi," portrayed by professional American wrestler and actress, Mimi Lesseos.

== Cast ==
- Jan Sebastian
- Tray Loren
- Mimi Lesseos
- Trudy Adams
- Patricia Cavoti
- Sue Sexton
- Jean Kirkland
- Jeff Lundy
- Tiffany Million
- Debbie Gordon
- Julia Ann
- Amy Barcroft
- Lee Marshall

Mimi Lesseos and Jan MacKenzie were both part of the Gorgeous Ladies of Wrestling.

== Release ==
The film was released worldwide in 1990 in Finland, France, Germany, Portugal, and Spain under the American Angels title, sometimes without the “Baptism of Blood” suffix.

A DVD version was issued on November 15, 2016.

== Reception ==
Slam Wrestling website said "Look, if you want an R-rated skin flick, then this movie will do just fine for you. If, on the other hand, you’re looking for some solid wrestling content, then you can have that too. You just can’t get it without the skin."

Vern called it "genuine exploitation with raw acting and laughably gratuitous T&A business."
