= I Need (film) =

- Directed by: Ferd Sebastian
- Written by: Beverly Sebastian as "Ann Cawthorne"
- Produced by: Ferd Sebastsian; Beverly Sebastian
- Starring: Ceci Weathers
- Release date: 1967
- Running time: 83 minutes
- Country: United States
- Language: English
- Budget: $7,000

I Need (or I Need a Man) is a 1967 American drama film concerned with a young girl who becomes a schizophrenic nymphomaniac after a childhood rape. It was the first movie from Beverly Sebastian and Ferd Sebastian, who self financed it for $7,000 and filmed it around Houston. The Sebastians distributed the film themselves and managed to recoup their money, launching their careers.

== Cast ==
- Ceci Weathers as Ceci
- Tom Hunter as Alex
- Jay Froman as Murry
- Sylvia Froman as Mother

Prior to starring in I Need, Tom Hunter guest starred on the 1960s, U.S television series Flipper and Hawk, then Gunsmoke, after. Working mostly in European-made films, Hunter starred in The Vampire Happening (1971), The Human Factor (1975), and The Cassandra Crossing (1976).

== Production ==
The credited writer "Ann Cawthorne" was a pseudonym for Beverly Sebastian.

Ferd Sebastian later said "Like in most of our films we did all the work. But in that one, I mean all [films we do], there was only the two of us and the cast which was about 4 people."

== Release ==
Per the IMDb.com, the film was released in the U.S on December 28, 1967, the Netherlands on August 28, 1969, and France in August 1970.

== Reception ==
Ferd Sebastian said ". . . it is the only picture we ever made in black and white and that it was too artsy. . . . It has a little sex and it has a little of this but it's very artsy. It looks like a Fellini film or something."

The Sebastians said the film was not making money in cinemas until a distributor bought the film, and created a poster using a still from the movie where a woman looks like she is having sex, then added the log line "I need a man." This was a successful technique although the Sebastians recognised it misrepresented the film.

A 1993 article said the film had made several hundred thousand dollars.
