= Playa Del Rock =

Studio album by London
- Released: December 19, 1990
- Genre: Glam metal; hard rock
- Length: 41:28
- Label: Noise
- Producer: Richard Podolor

London chronology
Don't Cry Wolf (1986)	Playa Del Rock (1990)	London Daze (2000)

Playa Del Rock is the third studio album by American hard rock band London, released on December 19, 1990, by Noise Records. Some versions of this album was released under the band name D'Priest. Studio recording included appearances by Jimmy Greenspoon of Three Dog Night, Guy Babylon of Elton John as well as Richard Podolor, a/k/a Richie Allen on Mandolin.

"Hot Child in the City" is a Nick Gilder cover.

== Track listing ==
1. "Ride You Through the Night" - 4:23
2. "Russian Winter" - 3:09
3. "It's So Easy" - 5:06
4. "Miss You" - 6:17
5. "Money Honey" - 3:33
6. "Love Games" - 4:01
7. "Heart Beat (It's All Right)" - 4:26
8. "Hot Child in the City" - 3:26
9. "The Wall" - 5:26
10. "Been Around Before" - 3:41

== Personnel ==
Band members

- Nadir D'Priest - vocals
- Sean Lewis - guitar
- Brian West - bass
- Alan Krigger - drums
- Vincent Gilbert - Keyboards

Additional musicians

- Guy Babylon, Jimmy Greenspoon - keyboards
- Richie Allen (> producer) - mandolin

Production

- Richard Podolor - producer
- Bill Cooper - engineer
