= Disconnected (1984 film) =

1984 American film

- Promotional poster
- Directed by: Gorman Bechard
- Written by: Gorman Bechard; Virginia Gilroy
- Produced by: Gorman Bechard
- Starring: Frances Raines; Mark Walker; Carl Koch
- Cinematography: Gorman Bechard
- Edited by: Gorman Bechard
- Music by: Steve Asetta
- Production company: Generic Films
- Release date: May 11, 1984
- Running time: 82 minutes
- Country: United States
- Language: English
- Budget: $48,000

Disconnected is a 1984 American psychological slasher film produced and directed by Gorman Bechard, written by Bechard and Virginia Gilroy, and starring Frances Raines, Mark Walker, and Carl Koch. Its plot follows Alicia, a young video rental store clerk in a small Connecticut town who is tormented by bizarre, unearthly phone calls. Meanwhile, a string of violent serial killings are occurring amongst locals.

== Plot ==
Alicia is a young woman working as an employee at a video rental store in Waterbury, Connecticut. One afternoon, she is met outside her apartment by an elderly man dressed in black who asks to use her phone. She obliges, but finds after the two enter her apartment that the man has strangely disappeared. While out for drinks later, Alicia recounts the bizarre incident to her boyfriend, Mike, a local disc jockey, and her glamorous twin sister, Barbara Ann—both dismiss it as a strange coincidence. Meanwhile, a serial killer is murdering young women in the town, and the crimes are being investigated by Detective Tremaglio.

While working at the video store one afternoon, Alicia is met by an awkward young man, Franklin, who peruses the store, despite telling her he does not own a video player. He attempts to make conversation with Alicia before leaving. He returns the next day and asks Alicia out on a date, but she politely declines. Later that night, Alicia receives several bizarre phone calls in which she hears Mike and Barbara Ann discussing the romantic affair they are having, apparently unaware they are being listened to. Alicia subsequently has several nightmares within nightmares in which Mike and Barbara Ann come to her apartment and murder her.

The next day, Alicia phones Franklin and tells him she would like to go on a date with him after all. He obliges, though he says it will have to wait as he is busy; unbeknownst to Alicia, he is lying in bed with a woman's bloody corpse. After their phone call ends, Franklin has sex with the dead woman's body. Several days later, Alicia and Franklin go on a date to see a movie. At the theater, they run into Barbara Ann, who is also on a date. Alicia, having to work early in the morning, ends her date with Franklin and returns home. Meanwhile, Franklin visits a local bar where he meets another woman and brings her to his house. The two have sex before he eviscerates her with a switchblade.

Alicia continues to be tormented by strange phone calls, some of which emit unearthly sounds. Despite changing her phone number, the calls continue. Alicia goes to Franklin's for a dinner date, after which the two have sex. In the morning, Franklin prepares to murder Alicia, but finds she has already left for work. The next day, Barbara Ann visits Franklin at his home and seduces him. After she performs oral sex on Franklin, he murders her. Alicia stops by the next morning to visit Franklin, and finds Barbara Ann's body before being confronted by Franklin. Her screams are heard from Tremaglio, who happens to be patrolling the neighborhood. As Franklin declares that he is not the serial killer, he is shot and killed by Tremaglio and his partner.

Distraught, Alicia returns to her apartment where she continues to be bothered by the recurring phone calls, and enters a depressive state. She is further horrified when she hears on the radio that another female murder victim has been found in town, suggesting Franklin may not have been the primary serial killer. Alicia's mental state continues to rapidly decline. She accepts Mike's repeated requests for a date, and the two begin seeing each other again. After dropping Alicia off from an evening date, Mike makes a call from a pay phone. In her apartment, Alicia receives yet another demented call. She proceeds to destroy her phone in a fit of rage, but the ominous sounds persist as blood pours from the phone receiver. In the morning, the elderly man whom Alicia let into her home several weeks prior is seen emerging from her apartment.

== Cast ==
- Frances Raines as Alicia Michaels / Barbara Ann Michaels
- Mark Walker as Franklin
- Carl Koch as Mike
- Professor Morono as Joey
- William A. Roberts as Old Man
- Carmine Capobianco as Tremaglio
- Ben Page as O'Donovan
- Donna Derouin as Girl Franklin Takes Home
- Stefan Rybak as Charles Keaton
- Gorman Bechard as Niles

== Themes ==
Journalist Matt Damsker likens Disconnected to a "demonic slasher film," featuring both slasher and supernatural horror elements.

== Production ==
=== Filming ===
Disconnected was shot on location in Waterbury, Connecticut in the fall of 1983 on a budget of around $48,000.

=== Music ===
The film features a soundtrack of several 1980s new wave and rock bands, including "Talking to a Stranger" and "Scream Who" by Hunters & Collectors; "Complicated Game" by XTC; and "Chizoola" by Haysi Fantayzee. Notably, a 19-year-old Jon Brion, who was a member of The Excerpts at the time, had his first role in the film. Brion is one of the band members performing at the initial bar scene. The band contributed the songs "You Don't Love Me," "Death in Small Doses," and "I Only Dream in Color."

== Release ==
=== Critical response ===
Variety gave the film a middling review, describing it as "a low-budget horror film made by locals in Waterbury, Connecticut, which tries to surmount the clichés of the genre, but emerges as a routine picture."

Brian Collins of Birth.Movies.Death. wrote that the film "borrows some language from the slasher textbook, but it's also got supernatural elements, police procedural scenes (including a bizarre series of interviews where Capobianco's character talks directly to the camera, usually to fill in gaps in the plot), and a minor psychological thriller flair."

=== Home media ===
Disconnected was released on VHS in the United States in 1986 by Active Home Video. Under a sub-licensing arrangement, Video Treasures re-released the VHS in 1989.

On November 24, 2017, Disconnected was given a limited edition release on Blu-ray by Vinegar Syndrome, numbered at 2,000 units.

== Sources ==
- Albright, Brian (2012). Regional Horror Films, 1958-1990: A State-by-State Guide with Interviews. Jefferson, North Carolina: McFarland & Company. ISBN 978-1-476-60042-0.
