= Frances Raines =

American actress (born 1962)

- Born: July 17, 1962 (age 63); Reno, Nevada, U.S.
- Occupation: Actress
- Years active: 1984–1987 2013-present
- Relatives: Claude Raines (great-uncle)

Frances Raines (born July 17, 1962) is an American actress who appeared in a number of horror and exploitation films throughout the 1980s, most notably Buddy Cooper's The Mutilator as Linda, and three directed by Tim Kincaid. Raines is also the grandniece of Claude Raines, of Casablanca and The Invisible Man fame.

== Filmography ==
Year	Title	Role	Notes	Ref.
1984	Disconnected	Alicia / Barbara Ann		
1984	Model Behavior	Lily White Girl		
1985	The Mutilator	Linda		
1986	Bad Girls Dormitory	Barb		
1986	Ryder P.I.	Valerie		
1986	Breeders	Karinsa		
1987	Riot on 42nd St.	Barbara		
