= On the Air Live with Captain Midnight =

1979 American film by Beverly Sebastian and Ferd Sebastian

- Directed by: Beverly Sebastian; Ferd Sebastian
- Written by: Ferd Sebastian; Beverly Sebastian
- Produced by: Ferd Sebastian; Beverly Sebastian; Ben Sebastian; Cary Glieberman
- Starring: Tracy Sebastian; John Ireland; Dena Dietrich; Ted Gehring
- Cinematography: Nicholas Josef von Sternberg
- Edited by: Beth Bergeron; Dwight Rasmussen
- Music by: Bob Feldman; E. Baker Scott
- Release date: 1979
- Running time: 83 minutes
- Country: United States
- Language: English

On the Air Live with Captain Midnight is a 1979 American comedy-drama film directed by Beverly Sebastian and Ferd Sebastian with Tracy Sebastian as Marvin Ziegler, also known as Captain Midnight (not to be confused with the Captain Midnight serial character from the 1930s and 1940s), who runs his own pirate radio station and becomes an underground cult hit. As "Tray Loren," Tracy Sebastian also starred in the Sebastians' Rocktober Blood.

The film was released in 1979 although it was filmed in 1977. The film is about a teenager who has a mobile broadcast transmitter in his van that allows him to take over the airwaves as a renegade disc jockey. Veteran Los Angeles DJ Jim Ladd co-stars in the film as a disc jockey.

== In popular culture ==
Drawing upon the pirate radio themes in the film, the protagonist's name was later used in the 1986 Captain Midnight pirate satellite broadcast on HBO protesting scrambling equipment and high fees.
