= Stunt Rock =

- US film poster
- Directed by: Brian Trenchard-Smith
- Screenplay by: Paul-Michel Mielche Jr.; Brian Trenchard-Smith
- Produced by: Martin Fink
- Starring: Grant Page; Monique van de Ven; Margaret Trenchard-Smith; Sorcery
- Cinematography: Robert Primes (as Bob Carras)
- Edited by: Earl Watson; Robert H. Money; Beth Bergeron
- Music by: Sorcery
- Production companies: Intertamar; Trenchard Productions
- Distributed by: GUO Film Distributors (Australia); Concorde Film (Netherlands); Film Ventures International (US)
- Release date: June 30, 1978 (Netherlands)
- Running time: 86 minutes
- Countries: Australia; Netherlands; United States
- Language: English
- Budget: $450,000
- Box office: AU$54,000 (Australia)

Stunt Rock is a 1978 Australian mockumentary musical action film directed by Brian Trenchard-Smith and starring Grant Page.

== Plot ==
Australian stuntman Grant Page accepts a job on an American television series and travels to Los Angeles, where he reunites with his cousin, Sorcery band member Curtis Hyde. Hyde performs with a heavy metal band called Sorcery, playing the part of The Prince of Darkness who is locked in cosmic combat with the King of the Wizards. While the band plays out the story with its signature brand of theatrical but muscular hard rock, Page's first stunt for the cameras goes awry and he is hospitalized, but defies his doctors by escaping out a fifth story window to get back to the set. Such reckless behavior attracts the attention of newspaper reporter Lois, who is writing an article about the career-obsessed, and co-star Monique van de Ven, who both gravitate towards the stuntman's professional fearlessness. Together they attend Sorcery concerts, enjoy Hollywood parties with the band and explore the nature of extreme living.

== Cast ==
- Grant Page as himself
- Monique van de Ven as herself
- Margaret Trenchard-Smith (as Margaret Gerard) as Lois Wills
- Sorcery as themselves:
  - Paul Haynes – King of the Wizards
  - Curtis Hyde – Prince of Darkness
  - Greg Magie – Lead Singer
  - Smokey Huff – Lead Guitar
  - Richie King – Bass Guitar
  - Perry Morris – Drums
  - Doug Loch – Keyboards
- Richard Blackburn as Agent
- Ron Raley as TV Director
- Chris Chalen as Escapologist
- Barbra Paskin as herself
- Yana Nirvana as Assistant Director
- Phil Hartman as Monique's Assistant

== Production ==
Trenchard-Smith says he was in the shower in December 1977 when the concept of the film came to him. "Famous stuntman meets famous rock group - much stunt, much rock: the kids will go bananas! Eureka!" He wrote a six-page outline in half an hour, motivated in part by a desire to launch Grant Page as an international star. He sent the outline to a European distributor who had bought Trenchard-Smith's previous film, Deathcheaters, and who agreed to finance provided the film could be made in six months.

Trenchard-Smith hurriedly went to America to look for a band. Foreigner was interested but were on a tour and would not be back in time. Trenchard-Smith luckily found the Los Angeles–based band Sorcery. Sorcery was signed to do the picture in Dec. 1977, and signed with EMI Records in January 1978. The soundtrack album was recorded at the Warner Bros. Burbank CA. studios in March 1978. It was produced by Jimmy Haskell, and released on EMI records in the summer of 1978.

The director says he also had to rewrite the script to incorporate a Dutch actress for the Dutch market, and the making of the film was intensely political and happened in far too quick period of time. "It was a film that went from six page treatment to stereo answer print in 4 1/2 months. That is no way to make a feature and, when you see the film, you will answer why."

Stunt Rock includes footage from other films in which Grant Page had appeared, such as Mad Dog Morgan (1976).

== Reception ==
In 1980 Trenchard-Smith said in an interview that the film had "sold very well, even though it is probably the worst film I have made. Such is life. All I can say to other filmmakers is never let yourself be pressured into making a deal rather than a film, which is what happened to me. However his opinion seemed to soften and in 2010 he said the film "holds a special place for me".

Stunt Rock disappeared from theaters shortly after its 1982 re-release under the title Sorcery (an attempt to lure Sword and Sorcery fans into seeing the film), and was not seen by the general public for nearly 15 years. In 1997, a DVD of the film was released and distributed via the World Wide Web. As sales of that DVD increased, clips of the film began appearing on the Internet, uploaded primarily by Sorcery (Band) fans. As time passed, more people began to discover the film for the first time. That created the interest that motivated the company Code-Red to re-issue the film on DVD in 2009. The 2-DVD package includes interviews with the film's producer Martin Fink, director Brian Trenchard-Smith, Richard Blackburn (who plays Monique's agent and had previously directed the 1973 film Lemora), plus interviews with Sorcery band members Richard Taylor (guitarist) and Perry Morris (drummer).

In 2006, Trenchard-Smith tracked down a reel that was buried in someone's garage. The film has been restored and has been shown in a number of theaters around the world since then.
