= Sorcery (band) =

American Heavy Metal band

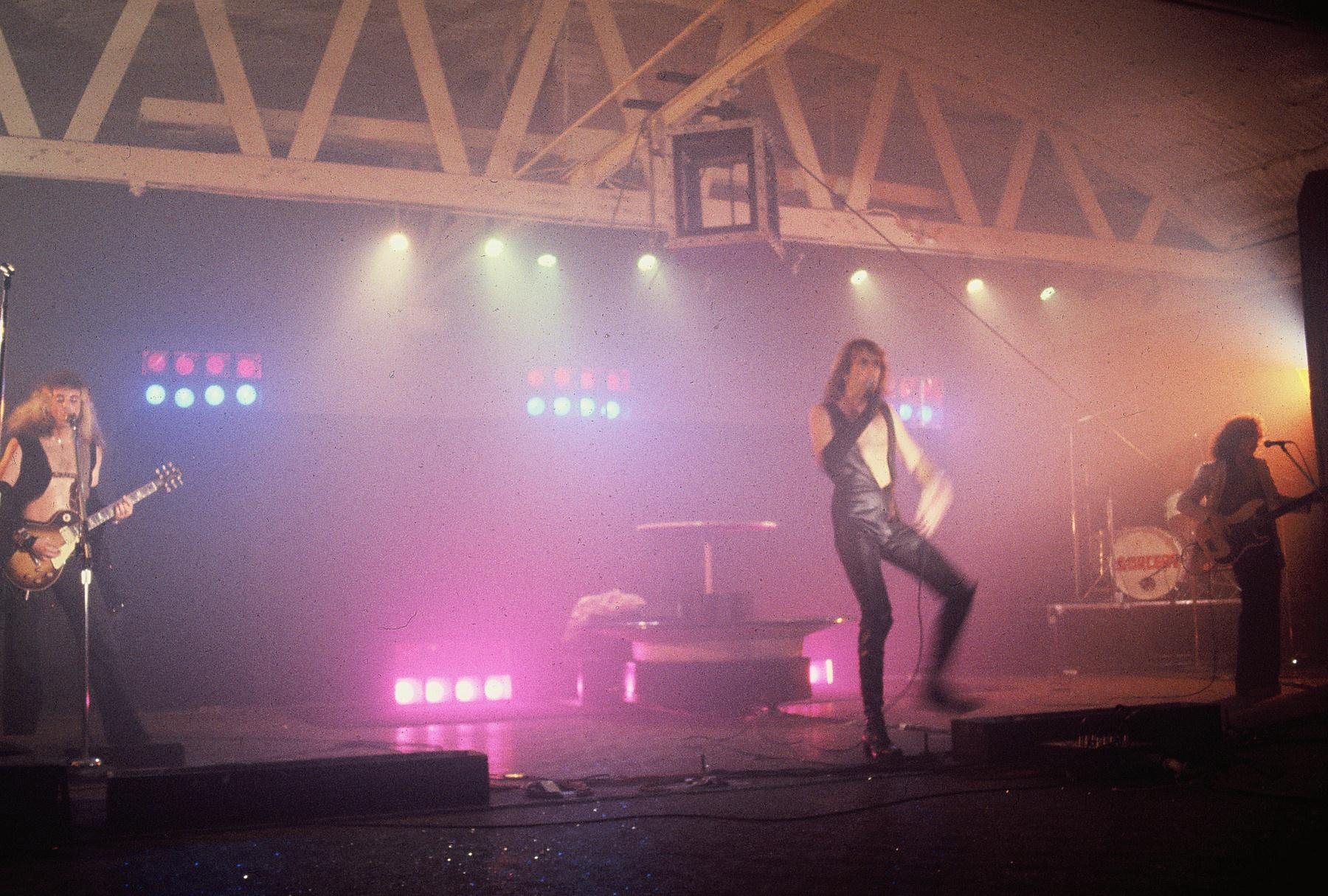
- Sorcery in Concert

Background information
- Origin: Hollywood, California, U.S.
- Genres: Hard rock, heavy metal
- Years active: 1975–1987, 2021-Present
- Labels: EMI Records, Groovy (Holland), Moving Image Entertainment Italy, Lunaris Records (2016) USA Sebastion Int'l Records RidingEasy Records
- Members: Richard "Smokey" Taylor; Richie King
- Past members: Perry Morris; Greg Magie; David Glen Eisley; Nigel Benjamin

Sorcery is an American hard rock band from Hollywood, California, United States.

== Background ==
Sorcery is a musical theatrical group from Los Angeles formed in 1975 by guitarist Richard 'Smokey' Taylor, bassist Richie King and vocalist Greg Magie. Known for their music and elaborate stage show consisting of a Heavy Metal band and two magicians who incorporated the use of magic illusions in the on-stage battle where Merlin takes on Satan.

Sorcery also appeared on Dick Clark TV specials. In 1982, they appeared on Dick Clark's 90-minute TV special, A Rockin Halloween. Other artists on this show included Devo, Eddie Money, Jermaine Jackson, and Toni Basil and hosted by Fred Travalena. In 1983 they again appeared on Dick Clark's Halloween TV special, "A Magical Musical Halloween" along with Kim Carnes, INXS, Sparks, Billy Joel, and Jeffrey Osborne. Hosted by master magician Harry Blackstone Jr. They also provided the bumper music for both specials.

In the summer of 1983, while they were recording and filming the Dick Clark special,Taylor, King and Morris were signed to do the "Rocktober Blood" movie project with filming and recording to start in September 1983. They would have on-screen parts playing the part of the fictitious "Headmistress" band and also provide the "A" side of the film's soundtrack album. They were members of S.A.G., (Screen Actors Guild,) AFTRA (American Federation of Television and Radio Artists), and the American Federation of Musicians, (AFM/AFofM) in Hollywood, California.

== History ==
=== 1970s ===
The band played at the Hollywood (Los Angeles) clubs Whisky a Go Go and the Starwood during 1976 and 1977. They headlined every one of those shows. After a 1977 show at the Starwood club in Hollywood, they were approached by William Nelson, from "Orr Management", and presented with a management offer with his company. They signed with his company, Orr Management in June 1977.

In September 1977, Arnie Frank, from the Jon Peters agency in Beverly Hills CA., called Sorcery's manager, William Nelson, regarding a movie project he was working on, ultimately entitled Stunt Rock. The executive producer for the film was Herman Ilmer, from the Bassart-Group in Holland, and it was produced by U.S. movie producer, Martin Fink. The deal was for the band to appear in the picture, and provided the movie's soundtrack. The film was being directed by Australian director, Brian Trenchard-Smith, and it starred Australian Stuntman Grant Page and the Dutch actress Monique van de Ven. The band would have a co-starring role as well. The picture was shot in Los Angeles in early 1978. The soundtrack album was recorded at the Warner Bros. Burbank studio's in March 1978 and produced by Sorcery. The film was released in Europe in the fall of 1978. For the U.S. and Canadian markets, Allied Artists bought the distribution rights. Three months prior to the release date, Allied filed Bankruptcy in New York. The distribution rights for the picture were then placed in 1980, with Film Ventures International who released the picture in the U.S. and Canadian markets.

=== 1980s ===
In 1981, Sorcery was signed to its second Management contract with Al Anthony. Anthony immediately booked them in Las Vegas, with "Starwood Productions" owner Beryl Cohen, to headline at the "Aladdin Theater for the Performing Arts", in Las Vegas for an October 31, Halloween Concert. That show was also co-hosted by a local Rock Radio station, "KENO FM-92". With the help of FM-92 radio station promotion, and local television ads, that concert sold-out in a matter of hours. After selling out the first show, Sorcery was asked to headline a second show the following weekend.

In 1982, Sorcery released the "Sorcery 2" album after Sorcery is contacted by the Dick Clark company's producer, Larry Klein, who signs Sorcery to appear on a 90-minute Dick Clark Halloween TV special, A Rocking Halloween. Other artists on this show were Billy Joel, DEVO, Jermaine Jackson, Toni Basil, William Shatner, and host Fred Travalena.

In 1983, Sorcery was asked back to do Dick Clark's second-anniversary Halloween TV special, A Magical Musical Halloween. This show featured, Sorcery, INXS, Jeffrey Osborne, Sparks, Eddie Money, and Kim Carnes. Hosted by master magician, Harry Blackstone Jr.

In the summer of 1983, Sorcery met with Rocktober Blood movie producers, Ferd and Beverly Sebastian. The results of that meeting, Sorcery band members, Richard Taylor, Richie King and Perry Morris sign with "Sebastian Productions", to do the motion picture, Rocktober Blood. They would play the part of the fictitious "Headmistress band" in the film. They also would provide the "A" side of the film's soundtrack album. The Rocktober Blood movie soundtrack album was recorded in part at the "Baby-O" studios on Sunset Blvd. in Hollywood, California.

The movie Rocktober Blood soundtrack album and movie were released in 1984.

=== 2000s-present ===
The Sorcery Live album was released in 2000.

In 2009, Code Red released a new DVD of the film Stunt Rock. A two-disc set includes interviews with the film's producer Martin Fink, Director, Brian Trenchard-Smith and Sorcery band members, Richard Taylor and Perry Morris.

In 2015, "Talking to the Devil" from the 1978 Stunt Rock soundtrack album was placed in Eli Roth's film Knock Knock.

In September 2016, the Rocktober Blood movie and soundtrack were re-released on Lunaris Records.

In January 2017, Stunt Rock film was re-released in various markets.

In March 2018, Sorcery's track, "Sacrifice" (From their 1978/Stunt Rock movie soundtrack LP) was placed in the film Death Wish.

In 2021, Sorcery members Taylor and King signed a Recording Contract with RidingEasy Records to reissue the original Stunt Rock soundtrack album. The digital release will be in the summer of 2022. The vinyl release was in early 2023 and is an authentic reissue right down to the bi-fold album cover.

In 2023, the Sorcery song Whales is featured on the RidingEasy Records release Scrap Metal 2. Sorcery 2 was also reissued. The 2023 Eli Roth movie Thanksgiving also featured three Sorcery songs, including a never before released instrumental track called "The Bats Are Flying." RidingEasy Records releases the Sorcery EP "Rocktober Blood".

In 2024 the Sorcery EP "Sorcery Instrumentals", the Sorcery album "Metallum Fortis" and the Sorcery album "Sinister Love Songs" are released. All of these feature new music by Sorcery. Also in 2024, "Sorcery Live" is remastered and released on all digital Platforms.

In 2025 Sorcery releases the EP "Return Of The Wizards Council". Songs on the EP are a sequel to the first Sorcery album "Stunt Rock".

== Members ==
=== Current ===
- Richard Taylor – Vocals, Guitars, Drums (1975–present)
- Richie King – Bass (1975– present)

=== Former ===
- Greg Magie – Vocals (1975–1979) (RIP)
- Perry (Pere') Morris – Drums (1976–1987) (RIP)
- David Glen Eisley – Vocals (1980–1982)
- Nigel Benjamin - Vocal (1983) (RIP)

=== Guest musicians ===
- Joe Porcaro – Percussion (Stunt Rock LP 1978)
- Doug Loch – Keyboards (1978)
- Steve Hendren – Keyboards (1982)
- Lon Cohen – Guitar (1983)

=== Magicians ===
- Richard Taylor played The Prince of Darkness
- David Eisley played Merlin
- Paul Haynes played Merlin
- Curtis James Hyde played The Prince of Darkness (RIP)

== Discography ==
- Stunt Rock: Movie Soundtrack (1978)
- Sorcery 2 (1982)
- Rocktober Blood (Band appears in film and on the soundtrack) (1984)
- Sorcery Live (2000)
- Rocktober Blood Soundtrack remastered and reissued (2016)
- Stunt Rock: Movie Soundtrack remastered and reissued (2022)
- Sorcery 2 remastered and released on all digital platforms (2023)
- Rocktober Blood soundtrack released as an EP on all digital platforms (2023)
- The Bats Are Flying from the Eli Roth movie Thanksgiving released as a digital single (2024)
- Sorcery Instrumentals released as an EP on all digital platforms (2024)
- Metallum Fortis album released on all digital platforms (2024)
- Sinister Love Songs album released on all digital platforms (2024)
- Sorcery Live is remastered and released on all digital Platforms (2024)

== Filmography ==
- Stunt Rock (1978) Starring Grant Page, Sorcery
- Rocktober Blood (1984)
- Twice Dead (1988)
- Knock Knock (2015)
- Death Wish (2018)
- Thanksgiving (2023)

== Band members history ==
Sorcery's guitarist, Smokey Huff, (AKA Richard "Smokey" Taylor) is from Dallas, Texas. Taylor relocated to Los Angeles in his early twenties to pursue his career in music. He played with members of Frank Zappa's Mothers of Invention, Rare Earth, Vanilla Fudge, Legs Diamond, Nazz and many others before starting Sorcery. Besides playing guitar for the band, he also sang and played keyboards on their albums. He is the primary songwriter for Sorcery. Although he has a vast collection of guitars, Taylor preferred playing his Gibson Les Pauls for the first two years with the band, and then built a custom Stratocaster that he used for Sorcery's studio work. He now uses Gibson, Fender and Kramer guitars. Taylor was endorsed by Hamer Guitars, Mosrite Guitars, Ampeg Amps, Travis Bean Guitars and B.C.Rich Guitars. He & King still actively record and have current music and videos online.

Sorcery's bass player Richie King, is from Sherman Oaks. King played on all the Sorcery albums. King connected with both Taylor and Magie in August 1975. King plays early Pre CBS Fender Precision bass guitars in the studio and on stage. King's stage amp set up was two Early Ampeg SVT amps, with 16X10" speakers, 2X15" speakers and 2X18" speakers. He was later endorsed by B.C. Rich guitar company. The B.C. Rich guitar company made the first custom built Stealth bass guitar (featured on the cover of Vintage Guitar magazine, see November 2008) in King's honor, as they were fans of his bass playing and Sorcery.

Sorcery's drummer Perry (Pere') Morris, was from Sherman Oaks, California. He played on all of Sorcery's early albums. He was a Local 47 Musicians Union member in Hollywood California. Morris also handled the business for the band. Utilizing his business background and industry contacts, he booked all the Hollywood "Whiskey", "Roxy" and "Starwood" and other shows for the band. Morris then secured a Management Company for the Sorcery group, with William Nelson, owner of "ORR" management, in Beverly Hills. William Nelson obtained the Stunt Rock movie and record deal for the band. Morris booked the band for the two Dick Clark TV special shows (1982 and 1983) for Sorcery, and in 1983 he made the Rocktober Blood movie deal for the band. Morris died in March 2020.

Sorcery band members Taylor, King and Morris also appear in the 1984 film Rocktober Blood as the "Headmistress" Band. They also are the musicians that wrote and recorded the majority of that film's soundtrack LP in 1984.
