= The Metal Years (album) =

Studio album by London
- Released: 2008
- Genre: Glam metal, heavy metal
- Label: Cleopatra Records
- Producer: Richie Podolor

London chronology
London Daze (2000)	The Metal Years (2008)

The Metal Years is the fourth album by London, released in 2008. It is actually a live recorded session that took place in 1989 right after their appearance in The Decline of Western Civilization Part II: The Metal Years.

The vinyl version of this album is a limited edition, with only 200 copies made.

== Track listing ==
1. "Night Rights"
2. "Can You Feel the Fire"
3. "Miss You"
4. "Ride You Through the Night"
5. "The Wall"
6. "Heartbeat"
7. "Ride Away"
8. "Spanish Harlem"
9. "Here It Comes"
10. "Oh! Darling" (The Beatles cover)
11. "Waiting"
12. "Love Games"
13. "Time Is Money"
14. "Break Out"
15. "Russian Winter"
16. "Shout at the Devil" (Mötley Crüe cover)

== Band members ==
- Nadir D'Priest - vocals
- Sean Lewis - guitar
- Brian West - bass
- Tim Yasui - drums
