= 'Gator Bait =

1974 film by Beverly Sebastian

- Theatrical release poster
- Directed by: Beverly Sebastian, Ferd Sebastian
- Written by: Beverly Sebastion
- Produced by: Beverly Sebastian, Ferd Sebastian
- Starring: Claudia Jennings
- Edited by: Ron Johnson
- Music by: Ferd Sebastian
- Production company: Sebastian International Pictures
- Distributed by: Sebastian International Pictures; Dimension Pictures
- Release date: 11 October 1973
- Running time: 88 minutes
- Country: United States
- Language: English
- Budget: $150,000

'Gator Bait (U.K. title: Swamp Bait) is a 1973 film written, produced, and directed by Beverly Sebastian and Ferd Sebastian.

The film starred former Playboy "Playmate of the Year" Claudia Jennings. It was followed by the sequel 'Gator Bait II: Cajun Justice.

== Plot ==
The film follows a barefoot poacher named Desiree Thibodeau who lives deep in the swampland. Ben Bracken and Deputy Billy Boy find Desiree trapping alligators and chase her, looking to rape her. Desiree outsmarts the two men. During the chase, however, Billy Boy accidentally shoots Ben. Billy Boy tells his father, Sheriff Joe Bob Thomas, that Desiree was the shooter. Sheriff Thomas and his son join a search party who is also looking for Desiree and attack her family. Desiree exacts her revenge against the attackers.

== Cast ==
- Claudia Jennings as Desiree Thibodeau
- Douglas Dirkson as Leroy Bracken
- Bill Thurman as Sheriff Joe Bob Thomas
- Ben Sebastion as Ben Bracken
- Tracy Sebastion as Big T.
- Sam Gilman as T.J. Bracken
- Clyde Ventura as Deputy - Billy Boy
- Don Baldwin as Pete Bracken
- Janit Baldwin as Julie
- Vocals by Lee Darin

Character actor Bill Thurman is best known for his work with writer-director Larry Buchanan on films such as Zontar, the Thing from Venus (1966) and Curse of the Swamp Creature (1966). He appeared in the major studio, mainstream films The Last Picture Show (1971) for Peter Bogdanovich, and The Sugarland Express (1974) for Steven Speilberg, that director's first theatrical feature.

Sam Gilman, a close friend of Marlon Brando, appeared alongside the actor in the Brando vehicle, One Eyed Jacks (1961).

== Production ==
Ferd Sebastian said the film was written as a vehicle for Claudia Jennings, with whom they had worked on The Single Girls. "She wanted to do a film with not a lot of dialog, so Gator Bait was it," said Sebastian. "As I really like to work with the Cajun people. We all piled into our motorhome and left LA... We were headed for the swamps, Myself, Bev, Claudia, our two boys a dog and a pregnant cat. It was by far the most fun shoot I have ever been on."

According to a contemporary article, the Sebastians wrote the film for Jennings but she was unavailable for filming. They shot the movie for a week on location trying to find another actress, but then Jennings became available. "I would never have been satisfied with anyone else," said Beverly Sebastian.

The film was shot over three months mostly in Uncertain, Texas, near Caddo Lake and off the bayous at Red River between Shreveport and Natichotes. "We were down there with all the floods and had our locations wiped out every day," said Jennings.

== Reception ==
The film made its world debut at the Rose Garden Drive In in Tyler.

According to a co producer on the film "Within a couple of weeks, we made a half million dollars on it. After 18 months, we made $15 million."

"We know our audience," said Ferd. "Our movies have a plot that goes A-B-C. Nothing complicated just a lot of action and a story I can understand, that you can understand and that the guy who dropped out of school in the ninth grade can get something out of."

== See also ==
- List of American films of 1974
