= Beverly Sebastian =

American film director

- Born: United States
- Occupation: Film director

Ferd Sebastian
- Born: 25 July 1933; Travis County, Texas, United States
- Died: 27 March 2022 (aged 88)
- Occupation: Film director

Beverly Sebastian and Ferd Sebastian are American film directors, producers and writers, whose independent films in the 1970s and 1980s were predominantly exploitation pictures similar to the work of Roger Corman and other directors in the 1960s at independent studios like American International Pictures.

The Sebastians were a working couple who collaborated on most aspects of filmmaking together. In an April 1999 interview with Ferd Sebastian by Andrew Leavold for the publication Mondo Stumpo, Ferd stated Beverly was 18 and he was 19 when they met at a Houston, Texas, roller skating rink. They ran away and got married 10 days after they met and remained married for 70 years. They got their start in the industry by producing television commercials that utilized Ferd's photography skills.

During an interview with JA Kerswell of the UK publication, Hysteria Lives!, Ferd Sebastian recalled, with his son Tracy's encouragement, he imported the French-made rock documentary about the Australian band AC/DC, AC/DC: Let There Be Rock, which played as a "midnight movie" in theaters across the United States.

After directing Running Cool in 1993, she and her husband retired to Florida. As of 2012, Sebastian runs The Greyhound Foundation which saves Greyhound dogs retired from racing, gives them medical assistance, and trains them with prisoners. Beverly Sebastian explained to the Ocala StarBanner that the foundation hosts events in conjunction with prison ministries and biker clubs, such as the Hawgs and Dawgs Love Run.

== Director and writer filmography ==
- Running Cool (1993)
- American Angels: Baptism of Blood (1989)
- 'Gator Bait II: Cajun Justice (1988)
- Rocktober Blood (1984)
- On the Air Live with Captain Midnight (1979)
- Delta Fox (1979)
- Flash and the Firecat (1975)
- 'Gator Bait (1974)
- The Single Girls (1974)
- The Hitchhikers (1972)
- Red, White and Blue (1971)
- The Love Clinic (1969)
- I Need (1968)
