= 1976 in Australia =

- Monarch: Elizabeth II
- Governor-General: Sir John Kerr
- Prime minister: Malcolm Fraser
- Population: 13,892,995
- Australian of the Year: Weary Dunlop
- Elections: VIC, NSW, TAS

The following lists events that happened during 1976 in Australia.

- Decades: 1950s; 1960s; 1970s; 1980s; 1990s
- See also: 1976 in Australian television; 1976 in Australian literature; Other events of 1976; Timeline of Australian history

== Incumbents ==
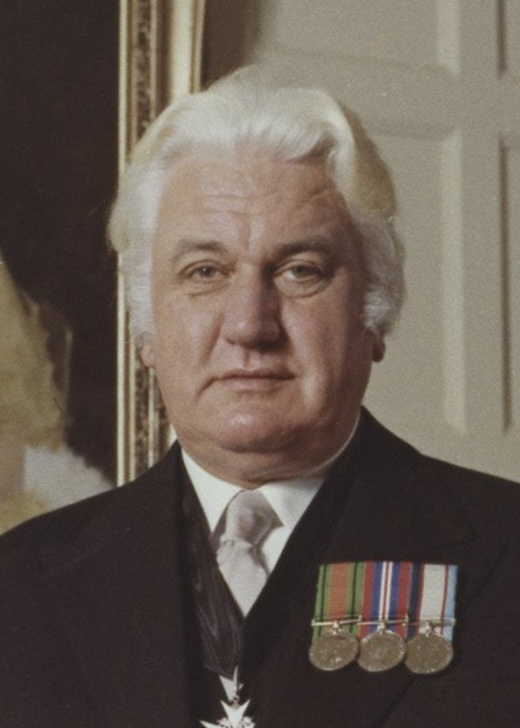
Sir John Kerr

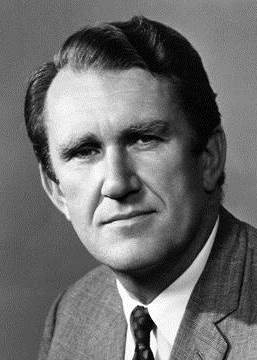
Malcolm Fraser

- Monarch – Elizabeth II
- Governor-General – Sir John Kerr
- Prime Minister – Malcolm Fraser
  - Deputy Prime Minister – Doug Anthony
  - Opposition Leader – Gough Whitlam
- Chief Justice – Sir Garfield Barwick

=== State and territory leaders ===
- Premier of New South Wales – Tom Lewis (until 23 January), then Sir Eric Willis (until 14 May), then Neville Wran
  - Opposition Leader – Neville Wran (until 14 May), then Sir Eric Willis
- Premier of Queensland – Joh Bjelke-Petersen
  - Opposition Leader – Tom Burns
- Premier of South Australia – Don Dunstan
  - Opposition Leader – David Tonkin
- Premier of Tasmania – Bill Neilson
  - Opposition Leader – Max Bingham
- Premier of Victoria – Rupert Hamer
  - Opposition Leader – Clyde Holding
- Premier of Western Australia – Sir Charles Court
  - Opposition Leader – John Tonkin (until 15 April), then Colin Jamieson
- Majority Leader of the Northern Territory – Goff Letts

=== Governors and administrators ===
- Governor of New South Wales – Sir Roden Cutler
- Governor of Queensland – Sir Colin Hannah
- Governor of South Australia – Sir Mark Oliphant (until 30 November), then Sir Douglas Nicholls
- Governor of Tasmania – Sir Stanley Burbury
- Governor of Victoria – Sir Henry Winneke
- Governor of Western Australia – Sir Wallace Kyle
- Administrator of Norfolk Island – Charles Buffett (until 31 May), then Edward Pickerd (until 4 September), then Desmond O'Leary

== Events ==
=== January ===
- 1 January –
  - The Australian Journalists Association's Queensland president Quentin Dempster says he intends to complain to state police minister Max Hodges about the conduct of Queensland police officers, alleging that they had coshed, elbowed and thumped journalists covering New Year's Eve on the Gold Coast, despite identifying themselves and showing their police press passes signed by commissioner Ray Whitrod. Hodges subsequently apologises on behalf of the Queensland Police Force, which Dempster accepts on behalf of AJA members.
  - Kenneth Nash, one of the key figures in the Bogle-Chandler case from 1963, is found shot dead near his home in the Sydney suburb of Chatswood.
- 2 January – An Italian family's rental yacht is sliced in two on Sydney Harbour when it collides with 2,539-ton Japanese ship Kaiyo Maru. 45-year-old Alitalia pilot George Morelli, his wife, their 16-year-old son and 12-year-old daughter all survive and escape with just minor injuries.
- 3 January –
  - New South Wales Police conduct three early morning raids on homes in the Sydney suburbs of Edgecliff, Randwick and Bellevue Hill and seize more than $100,000 worth of heroin.
  - A 22-year-old Australian man is killed when he slips and falls while climbing Mount Cook in New Zealand's Southern Alps.
  - A 44-year-old inmate at Melbourne's Pentridge Prison is seriously injured when he opens a box, booby-trapped with a bomb.
- 5 January –
  - The Family Law Act comes into effect as Elizabeth Evatt is sworn in as first Chief Justice of the Family Court of Australia.
  - Peko-Wallsend announces that 210 employees of their Mount Morgan Mine in Queensland will be retrenched due to depressed copper prices and dwindling ore reserves.
- 6 January –
  - A delegation of four United States congressmen led by Senator Ernest Hollings meets with prime minister Malcolm Fraser, foreign minister Andrew Peacock and opposition leader Gough Whitlam. Discussions include the development of the Diego Garcia military base in the Indian Ocean.
  - The body of a woman tied to an anchor with a nylon rope is found floating in Sydney Harbour. A post-mortem examination reveals she had been shot in the back of the head. She is identified as 24-year-old Maria Anne Hisshion who was last seen on 24 December 1975. Hisshion is later revealed to have been a suspected drug courier linked to the Mr. Asia drug syndicate.
- 9 January – The body of missing 48-year-old St Marys woman Coral Elaine Reeves is discovered in bushland at Marsden Park. She had been murdered on 4 January by a 48-year-old Bruce John Drawbridge while he was on weekend release from Silverwater Prison, having already been convicted and sentenced to life imprisonment after committing a double murder in 1959. Drawbridge is sentenced to life imprisonment for Reeves' murder.
- 10 January –
  - Three people drown in South Australia when their 14 ft dinghy capsizes near the mouth of the Murray River after their vessel's outboard motor fails causing the current to sweep it out into rough seas.
  - A large hailstorm hits the Queensland city of Toowoomba causing widespread damage, including to the roofs and windows of more than 100 homes. Seven people were treated by ambulance officers and two were taken to hospital with lacerations from flying glass.
- 12 January –
  - 8-year-old girl Eloise Worledge disappears from her home in the Melbourne suburb of Beaumaris, with police fearing she has been abducted.
  - Nobel Prize winning chemist John Cornforth is proclaimed as the Australian of the Year for 1975.
  - A 24-year-old coal miner is killed and four others injured during an underground gas explosion at the Nymboida Colliery, south-west of Grafton, New South Wales.
- 16 January – A freight train crashes into the rear of a passenger train at Glenbrook, killing an 84-year-old passenger and injuring ten others.
- 19 January – Tropical Cyclone David crosses the Central Queensland coast just north of St Lawrence, generating huge swells and causing extensive damage on Heron Island and in Yeppoon, particularly to infrastructure at Rosslyn Bay Harbour.
- 20 January –
  - In an apparent desire from within the party for stronger leadership, a spill motion was suddenly called for the leadership of the governing New South Wales Liberal Party. Sitting premier Tom Lewis opted not to contest the leadership ballot, with Sir Eric Willis elected to the position unopposed, making him the premier of New South Wales.
  - Four-year-old Peggy Clements is found alive on a remote property near Marble Bar, Western Australia after having been kidnapped from a car in Cobar, New South Wales eleven weeks prior. After being extradited to New South Wales, Kenneth Charles Stuart is charged and is found guilty by a jury of kidnapping, indecent assault and causing bodily harm. Stuart is sentenced to a total of 14 years in jail with a non-parole period of six years.
  - Supreme Court judge Gordon Samuels is appointed as chancellor of the University of New South Wales succeeding Sir Robert Webster.
- 26 January –
  - The 1976 Australia Day Honours are announced. Sir Bernard Heinze, Gordon Jackson, Peter Karmel, Ken Myer and Arthur Dale Trendall are made companions of the Order of Australia.
  - For the first time, Sydney's Australia Day ceremony is held outside Customs House at Circular Quay - the same location where Captain Arthur Phillip is believed to have first raised the British flag 188 years prior. A reproduction of the British flag of the time is raised followed by a three-gun salute.
- 27 January –
  - Gough Whitlam is comfortably re-elected as the leader of the Australian Labor Party despite being challenged for the leadership by Lionel Bowen and Frank Crean.
  - After 21 months in the role, Vince Gair is dismissed as ambassador of Australia to Ireland. Gair describes his dismissal as unfair and says had been given no reason for his sacking, and considered he had been a conscientious ambassador.
- 31 January – The Prime Minister Malcolm Fraser states that no "soft options" were left to get Australia out of its economic difficulties. In a major statement backing his Government's surprise opposition to wage indexations, he said it was a matter of wage increase or jobs.

=== February ===
- 1 February –
  - Five people are killed when two light planes collide above Parafield Airport, 16 km north of Adelaide.
  - Nick Parkinson is announced as ambassador of Australia to the United States.
  - James W. Hargrove is confirmed as the new ambassador of the United States to Australia.
- 6 February – 34-year-old Patricia O'Shane becomes Australia's first Aboriginal barrister.
- 9 February – Victorian Premier Rupert Hamer announces a 20 March date for the 1976 Victorian state election, saying it is the most convenient date because of the Premiers' Conferences due to be held in Canberra in late April and June.
- 10 February – Two RAAF helicopters rescue 54 passengers and 22 crew members who had been trapped aboard The Ghan passenger train which had been stranded for four days between the flooded Alberga and Finke Rivers near Oodnadatta in South Australia.
- 14 February – The 1976 Orange state by-election is held, which is won by the Country Party's Garry West.
- 16 February –A jury finds 56-year-old Norma Allison Pinker guilty of murdering her 49-year-old de facto husband Richard Bruce Abson, making her the first Victorian woman in ten years to be convicted of murder. Pinker is sentenced to life but unsuccessfully appeals the sentence. She had previously been acquitted for murdering her first husband in 1965, after claiming self defence.
- 22 February – Widespread damage occurs in the Queensland city of Bundaberg when Severe Cyclone Beth crosses the coast.
- 26 February – The Australian newspaper publishes allegations that Labor leader Gough Whitlam had discussed an offer from the Iraqi Government of providing a $US500,000 contribution to Labor's federal election campaign. In the story, purportedly written by Rupert Murdoch under the byline of "special correspondent", it was alleged pro-Palestinian activist Bill Hartley proposed to national Labor secretary David Combe that funding could be obtained from the Middle East for the party's campaign. Whitlam denies the allegation that he met with two Iraqi officials in Sydney just prior to the 1975 federal election to discuss the offer and launches defamation proceedings against News Limited. However, national ALP president Bob Hawke confirms the Iraqi Government had offered to make the $500,000 contribution, but that the party had rejected it. Prime minister Malcolm Fraser orders an inquiry into the visit to Australia in December 1975 by the two Iraqi officials.
- 28 February – Three people, including a fire officer, are taken to hospital after inhaling fumes from an ammonia leak in Harris Street in the Sydney suburb of Broadway.
- 29 February – A pilot and his five passengers are killed in a light aircraft crash near Merimbula, New South Wales.

=== March ===
- 2 March – Cyclone Colin affects the south Queensland coast, forcing the suspension of shipping services into Brisbane and causing winds of up to 93 km an hour.
- 3 March – The key man in the Labor campaign fund allegations, French-born businessman Henry Fischer breaks his silence to deny accusations that the Iraqi Government had offered money to the Australian Labor Party for election expenses last December.
- 8 March – More than 500,000 people line Swanston Street and St Kilda Road in Melbourne to watch the city's annual Moomba Parade led by the King of Moomba for 1976, Barry Crocker.
- 10 March – State member for Clayfield John Murray resigns from the Queensland Parliament. Murray's resignation and the death of state member for Port Curtis Martin Hanson in February trigger two by-elections to be held in May 1976.
- 18 March – After another day of heavy withdrawals from building societies in Queensland, Federal Treasurer Phillip Lynch reassures investors that there is no reason why events in Queensland – where five building societies have been suspended – should affect other states.
- 20 March – The 1976 Victorian state election is held which sees the incumbent Liberal government led by premier Rupert Hamer returned with an increased majority.
- 27 March – Municipal elections are held in Queensland where Brisbane lord mayor Bryan Walsh is defeated and is succeeded by Frank Sleeman. On the Gold Coast, 80-year-old Bruce Small defeats incumbent mayor Robert Neumann.
- 30 March –
  - United States vice-president Nelson Rockefeller arrives in Australia with his wife Happy and stepdaughter Malinda to attend United States Bicentennial engagements in Canberra and Sydney. One person is arrested after police clash with 150 demonstrators in Canberra, protesting Rockefeller's visit.
  - The official residence of Francis Roberts Rush, the Roman Catholic Archbishop of Brisbane, is damaged by a bomb blast.
- 31 March – 17 people are arrested at after around 600 anti-Nelson Rockefeller demonstrators clash with police after gathering in the Sydney CBD while carrying flags, placards and banners while chanting slogans.

=== April ===
- 1 April – Nelson Rockefeller, his wife and step-daughter leave Australia, but not before waiting on the tarmac in Air Force 2 to greet Nancy Kissinger who was flying into Australia to attend United States Bicentennial events.
- 2 April – France undertakes another underground nuclear weapons test at Mururoa in the South Pacific, which is condemned by Australian Conservation Foundation president Geoff Mosley who describes France as showing a great lack of sensitivity to the rights of people living in the Pacific region.
- 15 April – Colin Jamieson becomes Western Australia's opposition leader, succeeding John Tonkin who retires after having served in state parliament for over 43 years.
- 16 April – The Victorian Government offers $10,000 for information relating to the murder of 80-year-old TPI pensioner Noel McCoy who was killed in his home in the Melbourne suburb of Rosanna.
- 25 April –
  - Anzac Day services are held throughout Australia. Approximately 4,000 people attended Sydney's dawn service while 15,000 watched the march where one man dies and 10 others collapse and require treatment for exhaustion. Approximately 25,000 ex-service personnel take part in the march which was led by two Boer War veterans.
  - President of the KOTA Party in East Timor Jose Martins alleges that the Balibo Five had been executed in October 1975 despite the Indonesian Government previously claimed that they had been accidentally killed in crossfire.

=== May ===
- 1 May –
  - The 1976 New South Wales state election is held. After a close contest, Neville Wran is eventually elected as Premier of New South Wales, defeating Eric Willis. Willis is re-elected as the Leader of the Liberal Party, and therefore becomes Leader of the Opposition.
  - The top floor of the Cecil Hotel in the Sydney suburb of Cronulla sustains serious damage when a fire forces more than 200 people to evacuate, with three men forced to jump from the top floor to escape the fire.
- 2 May – An Ansett Australia DC-9 aircraft carrying 34 passengers is forced to abort its takeoff from Cairns Airport when one of its engines bursts into flames.
- 3 May – At a Labour Day rally in Townsville, federal opposition leader Gough Whitlam accuses former defence minister, Liberal senator Shane Paltridge, who died in 1966, of accepting bribes from the Lockheed Corporation. Former prime minister Robert Menzies describes Whitlam's allegations against Paltridge as "deplorable" while Leader of the Senate Reg Withers described them as "scurrilous garbage."
- 5 May –
  - 19-year-old shop assistant Margaret Rosetta Rosewarne disappears while hitchhiking on Queensland's Gold Coast. Her body is found at West Burleigh on 21 May. Police link Rosewarne's murder with those of 19-year-old Gabrielle Janke and 16-year-old Michelle Riley who were both murdered while hitchhiking on the Gold Coast three years prior.
  - It's revealed 39-year-old Australian Army officer Rex Clark has won Iran's equivalent of the Victoria Cross while serving as a mercenary in the Middle East.
- 6 May – 18-year-old Gail Patricia Euston is murdered by her former partner Ricky Ondrae Schafferius near Woodford, Queensland.
- 8 May – Diane Cilento, actress and former wife of Sean Connery, pleads guilty in the Perth Court of Petty Sessions to attempting to take an amount of Australian currency out of the country, exceeding the legal limit of $200. Cilento was fined $100 and ordered to pay court costs after having admitted to carrying $4,920 in cash.
- 10 May –
  - A police sniper shoots and kills an armed man at the centre of a siege at a Rundle Street gun shop in the Adelaide CBD.
  - Approximately 150 demonstrators protesting against Malcolm Fraser attempt to disrupt sculptor Guy Boyd's book launch at Melbourne University.
  - Around 100 demonstrators waving placards and chanting slogans surged around the vehicle carrying Sir John Kerr after his arrival at Perth Airport for a nine-day tour of Western Australia.
  - Wollongong couple Marinus and Louise Berghuis are presented with the Righteous Among the Nations medal for hiding a Jewish family from the Nazis while living in Holland during World War II.
- 13 May –
  - At its 25th general assembly in Philadelphia, the International Press Institute condemns the Australian Government for their apparent lack of action regarding the fate of the Balibo Five in East Timor.
  - Sir Douglas Nicholls accepts an offer to become the new governor of South Australia, making him the first Aboriginal Australian to hold the position.
- 20 May – A pilot and three passengers are killed when their light plane crashes into a radio mast at the edge of Cooma–Polo Flat Airport, near Cooma, New South Wales while attempting to land in thick fog.
- 21 May – Labor MP Keith Johnson receives treatment at Canberra Community Hospital for severe cuts the face after being injured in a fight inside the parliament building while entertaining delegates in his office at 2:30am.
- 22 May – The home of New South Wales premier Neville Wran's former wife Marcia in the Sydney suburb of Darling Point is fire-bombed.
- 24 May – The Australian Railways Union organises a nationwide 24-hour rail strike following the dismissal of a shunting supervisor in Townsville who was following the ARU's ban on railway workers handling or transporting chemicals used for uranium mining at Mary Kathleen, Queensland.

=== June ===
- 1 June –
  - Prime Minister Malcolm Fraser sets out his foreign policy objectives in a statement to the House of Representatives. He expresses his concerns about the ambitions of the Soviet Union (evidenced by its intervention in Vietnam and Angola), the strength of Warsaw Pact forces confronting NATO and naval expansion in the Indian Ocean. He condemns 'undue world criticism' of the United States and emphasises the importance of Australia's relations with Japan and China, as well as stressing the importance of close relations with the ASEAN countries, especially Indonesia.
  - The Federal Government fails in another attempt to persuade Queensland Premier Joh Bjelke-Petersen that the Australian-Papua New Guinea border in Torres Strait should be moved south.
- 3 June – After being recognised in the last year's Queen's Birthday Honours when he was made a Companion of the Order of Australia, Nugget Coombs resigns from the Order of Australia in protest against the recent introduction of knighthoods into the Order.
- 4 June –
  - An off-duty Victoria Police officer is shot after he attempting to stop an armed robbery of an ANZ Bank in Melbourne by deliberately crashing his car into the front door. The officer attempts to tackle the two armed men with a jack handle which he retrieves from the boot but is shot during the struggle as the men escape to a waiting getaway car. The officer is taken to St Vincent's Hospital in a serious condition.
  - Joe Calcraft resigns as general president of the New South Wales Dairy Farmers' Association after holding the position for eight years.
- 5 June –
  - The Fraser Government and PNG Ministers finally decide that the inhabited Torres Strait islands would remain part of Australia, though the seabed boundary would move.
  - The skeletal remains of Carolyn Trevallyan-Grattan, the great-granddaughter of William Arnott, are discovered by a doctor who was clearing land several blocks from where she went missing in the Sydney suburb of Balgowlah in 1971. According to New South Wales Police, there are no suspicious circumstances surrounding her death.
- 8 June – Cabinet agrees to a series of changes in the law governing the establishment, operation, management and supervision of building societies, following a run on a number of building societies, the temporary suspension of five and then the collapse of two of them, the Great Australian and City Savings Permanent Building societies, with a joint deficiency of $3.7 million. The Cabinet creates a contingency fund, funded by a compulsory levy on all permanent building societies in Queensland.
- 9 June – Governor-General Sir John Kerr is targeted by approximately 400 demonstrators outside the Royal Commonwealth Society building in Melbourne. The Rolls-Royce carrying Kerr and his wife Anne was hit with eggs, rocks, smoke bombs and ink bombs. Several police officers receive minor injuries and a flight lieutenant working as an aide-de-camp was cut on the face when a protestor smashed one of the windows with a brick. Two demonstrators are arrested and charged with assault, resisting arrest and assaulting police.
- 10 June – Foreign affairs minister Andrew Peacock announces he has separated from his wife Susan after 13 years of marriage.
- 11 June – Three men, a woman and a child are killed when a single engine Cessna 210 crashes near Cloncurry in North West Queensland.
- 12 June –
  - A 28-year-old man, his 27-year-old wife and their six-week-old daughter are killed when a single engine Cessna 172 crashes near Mudgee, New South Wales. Their three other young children aged between 3 and 5 are injured in the crash.
  - The 1976 Queens Birthday Honours are announced. Former prime minister Robert Menzies receives the first knighthood to be conferred under the Order of Australia, and Bernard Mills is made a companion of the Order of Australia. There are also 26 Australians who are also conferred with knighthoods and damehoods under the traditional British 1976 Birthday Honours.
  - Senior Labor Party members are angered with Jack Egerton accepting a knighthood conferred under the traditional British system in the 1976 Birthday Honours, contradicting the ALP's policy endorsing the abolition of British titles.
  - The Rolls-Royce transporting Sir John Kerr and his wife Anne to the Royal Military College at Duntroon is egged outside the college gates. The 27-year-old research officer who threw the egg is charged with offensive behaviour. She is fined $10 and convicted in August 1976.
- 15 June – Prime Minister Malcolm Fraser and his wife Tamie arrive in Japan.
- 16 June – Australia and Japan sign the Basic Treaty of Friendship and Cooperation, confirming the important trade relations between the two nations.
- 17 June – It's confirmed armed guards have been escorting Australian diplomats in Mexico following a threat to kidnap 29-year-old diplomat Penelope Wensley.
- 21 June – A Bank of New South Wales branch manager is shot and killed in the Westfield Parramatta shopping centre while chasing a man suspected of an attempted break-in at the bank.
- 23 June –
  - Governor-General Sir John Kerr is again targeted by protestors with a demonstration in Melbourne turning violent as Kerr and his wife arrive at a Law Institute dinner. Protestors hurl marbles and stones at police horses, while also damaging vehicles as they arrive. Ten people are arrested and a protestor is taken to hospital with a fractured ankle after she falls when a taxi attempting to get through pushes her aside. The violence is condemned by both sides of politics.
  - In the New South Wales Supreme Court, Justice Bill Cantor approves a compensation settlement totalling $698,542 to be paid by The Distillers Company to eight children whose mothers had taken the company's product Distaval which contained thalidomide during their pregnancies when it was sold in 1960 and 1961. The company has now paid a total of $2.5 million to 25 Australian children in the past two years.
- 24 June – New South Wales police name New Zealander Philip Archibald Lynwood Western as the man they suspect of murdering the bank manager in the Westfield Shopping Centre on 21 June. Western is already charged with stealing more than $76,000 in a bank robbery on 9 December 1974 and more than $89,000 in another bank robbery on 29 December 1975. He appeared in court on those charges in January 1976 but was released on a $10,000 bail on 27 May 1976.
- 29 June –
  - Philip Western, being sought for questioning regarding the murder of bank manager Lyn Callaghan, is shot and killed by police at an Avoca Beach property after he fires on police. Corrupt NSW Police officer Roger Rogerson later claims he was the officer that killed Western. The deaths of Lyn Callaghan and Philip Western trigger a debate around New South Wales bail laws with premier Neville Wran indicating he will investigate how Western had been released on bail. State secretary of the Australian Bank Officials' Association also condemns the decision to release an armed bank robber such as Western on bail, describing it as "appalling."
  - ALP and ACTU president Bob Hawke addresses the National Press Club in Canberra. In a wide-ranging address, Hawke champions an end to Australia's Westminster system of government, criticises Malcolm Fraser's trip to Asia, calls on the ALP to drop their preoccupation with Sir John Kerr and describes John Curtin as Australia's greatest ever prime minister.
  - New South Wales State Cabinet decides to appoint a three-member board of review to inquire into the future of the Eastern Suburbs Railway.

=== July ===
- 1 July –
  - Now convinced his daughter Juanita Nielsen has been murdered, 72-year-old Neil Smith announces he is offering a private reward of $50,000 for information leading to the arrest and conviction of those responsible for his daughter's murder.
  - ACTU and ALP president Bob Hawke pledges to curb his use of coarse language should he be successful in his bid to enter federal parliament.
  - Random breath testing of motorists becomes legal in Victoria with police officers permitted to set up breath testing stations on or near any highway.
- 2 July – Following the murder at Westfield Parramatta of bank manager Lyn Callaghan by gunman Phillip Western who had been earlier released on bail despite having been charged with two bank robberies, New South Wales attorney general Frank Walker announces the state government would be calling for a review of relevant court procedures, stating the release of Western had exposed a "serious breakdown" of the bail system.
- 4 July –
  - With senator Ivor Greenwood still in a coma after his heart attack in May, prime minister Malcolm Fraser announces changes to the Federal Cabinet. Minister for Repatriation Kevin Newman will take over Greenwood's portfolio. Newman will be succeeded as Minister for Repatriation by senator Peter Durack. Margaret Guilfoyle will replace Greenwood in the inner cabinet - the first woman to be appointed to cabinet since Enid Lyons.
  - Minister for Posts and Telecommunications Eric Robinson announces Sir Henry Bland has been appointed as the new chairman of the Australian Broadcasting Commission, succeeding Richard Downing who had died in November 1975. Bland's three year term commences on 26 July.
- 5 July –
  - 24-year-old car saleswoman Susan Knight is murdered by 26-year-old Geoffrey Charles Hunt at Dromedary in Tasmania. Hunt pleads guilty to Knight's murder and on 28 September 1976 is sentenced to life imprisonment.
  - A special conference of Australia's federal unions is held at Sydney Trades Hall where it's voted to hold a 24-hour national strike in protest of the Fraser Government's refusal to amend its Medibank policy.
- 6 July – Gollin Holdings Ltd sells its 50% stake in the Biro Bic operations in Australia and New Zealand to Ansett Transport Industries Ltd.
- 9 July – 12-year-old Gary John Barkemeyer is sexually assaulted and murdered by 16-year-old Mark Gregory in the Sydney suburb of Glebe. After a two-day trial in March 1978, Gregory is sentenced to two terms of life imprisonment after a 12-man jury finds him guilty of Barkemeyer's murder, and that of 12-year-old Wayne Spencer Nixon who he murdered in Glebe on 30 January 1977.
- 10 July –
  - A 32-year-old woman is killed and 24 others injured when a six-carriage passenger train derails in the Melbourne suburb of Laverton just east of Laverton railway station. Acting transport minister Jock Granter orders an inquiry into the derailment.
  - Taronga Zoo's 25-year-old Indian elephant Joan dies from heart failure following a twice-postponed operation to have 18 centimetres of her tail docked. The tail had become infected after another elephant chewed on it.
- 11 July – Former prime minister and current federal opposition leader Gough Whitlam is awarded the Silver Plate of Honour by the Socialist International in recognition of "great and historic services to peace, democracy and socialism."
- 12 July –
  - Approximately more than two million workers take part in Australia's first national 24-hour strike which is held in protest of the Fraser Government's Medibank charges. The strike brings Australia's heavy industry and much of the country's transport sector to a standstill. However, it's also estimated 5.2 million Australian workers (mainly from the retail, commercial and public service sector) reject union calls to join the strike and still report for duty.
  - Graham Delbridge is elected as the new president of the Australian Council of Churches.
- 19 July – Bunbury woodchip bombing: environmental activists set three bombs at the export terminal in Bunbury, Western Australia, in an attempt to disrupt the woodchipping industry. Limited damage results as two of the three bombs fail to explode, while no injuries are reported.
- 21 July – New South Wales premier Neville Wran says his government is planning to make it compulsory for women to be available for jury duty, as part of a general tightening of the Jury Act making it more difficult for people to gain an exemption.
- 22 July – Prime Minister Malcolm Fraser arrives in the United States for an 8-day visit to North America. He is greeted in San Francisco by new chief of protocol Shirley Temple Black.
- 23 July – Prime Minister Malcolm Fraser meets with Queen Elizabeth II in Montreal where she resolves to travel to Australia in March 1977 as part of her Silver Jubilee where she and Prince Philip will tour all states and the Northern Territory, despite the threat of demonstrations against the Governor-General Sir John Kerr.
- 24 July –
  - A bomb explodes just after midnight at the Imperial Hotel in Moree, New South Wales causing extensive damage to the foyer area. Police charge a 38-year-old man and a 19-year-old man with having maliciously used an explosive substance.
  - A 7-year-old boy is stabbed in the neck and chest in a toilet block adjoining the Kippax Fair Shopping Centre in Canberra. He is found unconscious and bleeding heavily by a shopkeeper and taken to Canberra Hospital where he undergoes surgery. A 13-year-old boy is arrested and charged with malicious wounding and assault.
- 25 July –
  - Five protestors are arrested during another demonstration against Governor-General Sir John Kerr after 100 demonstrators gather outside St Stephen's Presbyterian Church in the Sydney CBD where Kerr is attending a thanksgiving service to mark the 75th anniversary of the union of the presbyterian churches of Australia and Tasmania. The church is vandalised with "Sack Kerr" graffiti which prompts Kerr's secretary David Smith to issue a rare statement on Kerr's behalf in which he expresses his "loathing" and "disgust" while condemning the vandalism.
  - Moshe Dayan addresses a crowd of 3,000 at Sydney Town Hall in the first of a series of lectures in Sydney, Canberra and Melbourne, having been invited to Australia by the Zionist Federation of Australia. Around 1,000 demonstrators from the Palestinian Liberation Organisation jeered his arrival at the venue.
- 26 July – Queensland's deputy premier and treasurer, Liberal Party leader Sir Gordon Chalk announces he will be retiring from politics on 12 August, taking premier Joh Bjelke-Petersen by surprise.
- 27 July –
  - Federal opposition leader Gough Whitlam and his wife Margaret survive the 1976 Tangshan earthquake during their visit to China. The Tientsin hotel they are staying in splits in two during the quake which measures at 7.6 on the Richter scale. Margaret Whitlam, who receives a severe gash to her leg when a mirror shatters, describes the event as "absolutely terrifying" while her husband says he was impressed by the lack of panic.
  - Newcastle City Council votes to rescind an invitation to Governor-General Sir John Kerr to open a new administration building and to attend a civic reception due to a "strongly expressed adverse reaction" from local residents and a "wish to avoid likely embarrassment and incidents". Lord Mayor Joy Cummings who did not vote for Kerr to open the building said the council had been put in "a shameful position of inviting the Governor-General and then disinviting him."
  - A 2½ year old boy survives falling 60 metres from a cliff at Clifton, New South Wales.
- 29 July –
  - In Brisbane, a police inspector hits a girl on the head with a baton during protests by university students through city streets, sparking calls for an inquiry into police powers.
  - Papua New Guinea prime minister Michael Somare personally orders the deportation of a 34-year-old Townsville man. According to Somare, he had ordered the man to "pack his bags and go back to his own country" following an incident in which the man, a manager an earthmoving company, told a local worker not to arrive at work "dressed like Michael Somare" after his lap-lap became entangled causing a wheelbarrow of cement to overturn.
- 30 July –
  - Four men are killed when the single-engined Cessna 182 they were in crashes near Griffith, New South Wales while en route from Deniliquin to Narromine.
  - The body of 44-year-old taxi driver Cornelius van de Pavoort is found locked in the boot of his taxi in the Melbourne suburb of Coburg. A jury subsequently finds 22-year-old Steven Jeffrey Collins guilty of van de Pavoort's murder and he is sentenced to life imprisonment.
- 31 July – After 22 years in the New South Wales state parliament, 67-year-old former NSW Liberal Party leader Mac Hewitt retires.

=== August ===
- 1 August –
  - The 483-page report of the Royal Commission on Australian Government Administration is released, recommending overturning the centralised system of decision-making in the Commonwealth Public Service and allowing much greater sharing of power between officers and departments. The report is the product of two years of work.
  - 29 Australians are evacuated from Peking, China following the 1976 Tangshan earthquake as Chinese authorities warn of the possibility of a new powerful earthquake.
- 2 August –
  - Defence Minister James Killen rejects allegations made by former Deputy Prime Minister Jim Cairns that Australian soldiers were responsible for the alleged massacre of 27 people in Vietnam in July 1970.
  - New South Wales Premier Neville Wran calls for the abolition of the New South Wales bank holiday.
- 5 August – New allegations are made on ABC TV's This Day Tonight claiming that Australian servicemen killed unarmed civilians in Vietnam.
- 10 August –
  - The New South Wales Government guarantees an extra $15 million for the Sydney Water Board to create 750 more jobs the 1976–77 financial year in an effort to relieve increasing unemployment in the state.
  - Max Hodges is removed from the position of Queensland Police Minister due to his unresolved disagreements with the Queensland Police Union. He is replaced by Tom Newberry.
- 17 August – The 1976 Australian federal budget is handed down by the Treasurer of Australia Phillip Lynch. It predicts a deficit of $2,608 million and an inflation rate of 8–9% by mid-1977.

=== September ===
- 1 September –
  - 24-year-old convicted armed robber Stephen Leslie Shipley hides in a laundry van to escape from Parramatta Gaol where he is serving a 20-year sentence. He had previously escaped from Long Bay Gaol in 1974.
  - 22-year-old labourer John Barry Keading is sentenced to life imprisonment for murdering 29-year-old Brian Meldrum in a park in the Sydney suburb of Cremorne on 8 November 1974. Keading had pleaded not guilty and claimed he gave a confessional statement because police officers had threatened to bash him.
  - Cigarette and tobacco advertising banned on television and radio.
  - Geoff Cahill, the state secretary of the New South Wales Labor Party, resigns.
- 2 September – New South Wales premier Neville Wran rushes to Sydney radio station 2GB believing he could convince a man claiming to be prison escapee Stephen Shipley to surrender to police. The man claiming to be Shipley spoke with 2GB announcer Holgar Brockmann while another man claiming to be Shipley's friend spoke with Wran, and claimed they were calling from a payphone in Sydney's northern suburbs. New South Wales police later said they believed the phone calls to 2GB were a hoax.
- 3 September –
  - ACTU president Bob Hawke calls a meeting for 8 September in an attempt to resolve the industrial disputes which had disrupted the ports of Sydney and Melbourne.
  - Meanwhile, a defamation action brought against Sydney radio station 2GB by Hawke is settled out of court. Hawke had alleged he had been defamed in three breakfast news bulletins on 31 January 1975 which had caused damage to his reputation.
- 5 September – A father urges the New South Wales government not to release his 31-year-old son, convicted murderer Allan Raymond Bassett. With Bassett's life sentence about to be reviewed, his father writes a letter to state justice minister Ron Mulock appealing for his son's continued detention at Long Bay Gaol. Bassett was sentenced to life imprisonment in September 1966 for murdering Carolyn May Orphin in Wollongong on 11 June 1966.
- 7 September
  - Three men are killed when a single-engined Cessna 172 crashes into Lake Powlaphanga near Charters Towers, Queensland. A fourth man survives.
  - A two-year-old girl and her mother are injured when they are mauled by a lion at Bullen's African Lion Safari Park in the Melbourne suburb of Rockbank.
  - New South Wales premier Neville Wran announces Edwin Lusher will conduct an inquiry into legalising casinos within the state and says he believes the first legal casinos could be operating in the state in 1977. With the decision to legalise casinos already having been made, Lusher's role simply to recommend how to achieve their introduction.
  - The US Navy's nuclear warship USS Truxtun arrives in Melbourne.
- 10 September –
  - A 41-year-old Sydney doctor, his 44-year-old wife and his two sons, aged 18 and 16, as well as a 57-year-old Sydney man and his 54-year-old wife are all killed when a British Airways Trident collides with a Yugoslav Airlines DC-9 near Zagreb which kills all 176 people aboard both aircraft.
  - New South Wales police commissioner Frederick Hanson announces his retirement.
- 12 September – 84-year-old Sir Edward McTiernan retires after serving 46 years as a judge on the High Court of Australia.
- 13 September – Britain's Conservative Party leader Margaret Thatcher arrives in Australia for a nine-day visit to Australia on the invitation of Australia's Liberal Party.
- 30 September –
  - The Anglican Diocese of Melbourne becomes the first in Australia to support women being admitted into the priesthood when the diocesan synod votes in favour of allowing women to be ordained as priests.
  - Blue Hills, the ABC's long-running radio serial created by Gwen Meredith concludes after being broadcast nationally for 27 years.

=== October ===
- 1 October – Medibank Private is established following legislation passed allowing the Health Insurance Commission (HIC) to enter the private health insurance business.
- 16 October – Liberal candidate Tony Bourke wins the Lockyer by-election in Queensland, which was triggered by the retirement of Gordon Chalk.
- 20 October - The body of 76-year-old Matilde Dorothea Braun is discovered by relatives at her home in the Brisbane suburb of Banyo. A post-mortem examination reveals she has been raped and murdered.
- 26 October – An environmental inquiry makes recommendations to the Federal Government that all sand mining on Fraser Island should stop.
- 28 October – Justice Russell Walter Fox delivers his first report resulting from his inquiry into the proposed Ranger Uranium Mine in the Northern Territory.

=== November ===
- 4 November – A White Paper on defence is tabled in federal parliament by defence minister James Killen. This notes that Britain, Australia's traditional protector, is no longer a significant power east of Suez and that Australia's defence must become increasingly self-reliant.
- 5 November – In Brisbane, after a trial that lasted 126 days, a jury finds three men not guilty of official corruption charges. One was a serving policeman, the second the person who had allegedly been involved in trying to bribe him and the third a policeman who had retired. That last man, Jack Reginald Herbert, was later to admit his guilt during the Fitzgerald Inquiry for this and many similar crimes, and implicate Terry Lewis as an active member of "the joke".
- 10 November – The Fraser Island Report recommendations are accepted by the Federal Government but resisted by Queensland Premier Joh Bjelke-Petersen.
- 15 November – Ray Whitrod resigns as Queensland Police Commissioner, claiming he could no longer function under such a high level of government interference.
- 18 November – Prime Minister Malcolm Fraser announces that Treasury will be split into separate departments of Treasury and Finance.
- 28 November – Federal Cabinet agrees to a 17.5% devaluation of the Australian dollar (which brings it almost to parity with the American dollar) and the 'adoption of a flexibly administered exchange rate, along the lines of a "managed float".’ Financial institutions would be closely monitored to ensure that lending 'comes back from recent excessive and unsustainable levels', government expenditure would be reviewed once again and the strongest possible arguments for restraint would be put to the December quarter National Wage Case.

=== December ===
- 1 December – Sir Douglas Nicholls is officially sworn in as South Australia's new governor succeeding Sir Mark Oliphant.
- 4 December – The Royal Australian Navy's fleet of Grumman Tracker aircraft is destroyed by arson at Nowra, New South Wales.
- 16 December – The Aboriginal Land Rights (Northern Territory) Act is enacted.
- 17 December – Cabinet agrees to establish an Australian Human Rights Commission to deal with complaints of discrimination on the grounds of race or on other grounds prohibited by future Commonwealth laws. The Commission would review existing and future Commonwealth and state laws, and report on their consistency with the International Covenant on Civil and Political Rights to which Australia was a signatory but not a party.

=== Full date unknown ===
- Edward (Weary) Dunlop is announced as Australian of the Year
- Gascoigne Leather Furniture is founded in Perth, Western Australia.

== Arts, music and literature ==
=== January ===
- 10 January – Sherbet's manager Roger Davies announces the band's guitarist Clive Shakespeare had left the group to pursue his own interests.
- 11 January – The Average White Band arrives in Australia to begin a two-week national tour, commencing in Perth.
- 18 January –
  - The ABC's rock music station 2JJ celebrates their first anniversary with a family fun day in Sydney's Victoria Park which was attended by approximately 25,000 people.
  - Sir Frank Kitto is announced as the inaugural chair of the Australian Press Council.
- 21 January – Dame Joan Hammond resigns as artistic director of Victoria State Opera, due to her opposition to "the new idea of policy".
- 23 January – John Bloomfield is announced as the winner of the 1975 Archibald Prize for his picture of film director Tim Burstall.
- 24 January – The ABC's new radio network ABC-FM begins broadcasting in Sydney, Canberra, Melbourne and Adelaide with the station playing mostly classical music.
- 25 January – The 1976 Country Music Awards of Australia are held in Tamworth where Slim Dusty's Lights on the Hill wins Album of the Year. "Santa Never Made It into Darwin" by Bill and Boyd wins Song of the Year. Heather McKean and Rex Dallas are awarded female and male artists of the year respectively.

=== February ===
- 6 February – British group The Hollies arrive in Sydney to commence their fifth tour of Australia.
- 17 February – American singer Neil Diamond arrives in Australia for a series of concerts.
- 23 February – American singer Neil Diamond takes exception to the No Smoking signs during his concert at Sydney's Hordern Pavilion and invites the 5,000 concertgoers to light up cigarettes during his concert. Speaking in state parliament the next day, NSW Chief Secretary Peter Coleman confirms Diamond had breached safety regulations and said the concert promoters had been dismayed at Diamond's behaviour and that Hordern management was sending Diamond a letter advising him of the breach.
- 27 February –
  - It's announced that the 1975 Archibald Prize had been taken away from John Bloomfield, who is deemed to have been ineligible due to his portrait having been painted from a photo rather than still life. Kevin Connor is subsequently named as the 1975 Archibald Prize winner for his portrait of Frank Kitto.
  - American singer Melanie arrives in Australia prior to a concert at Sydney Town Hall.
  - Israeli singer Yafa Yarkoni arrives in Australia for a 10-day concert tour. Upon her arrival, she criticises the United States and the Soviet Union for creating political turmoil in the Middle East, saying she believed that Israel and Arab countries could find peace without superpower interference.

=== March ===
- 13 March – Shirley Bassey returns to Australia for another concert tour.
- 30 March – A photography exhibition by Lord Snowdon opens in Sydney which features over 200 selected studies from Snowden's career. There had been an incident at a preview of Snowdon's exhibition on 25 March where two journalists were physically ejected, accused of attempting to ask questions regarding Snowdon's separation from Princess Margaret.

=== April ===
- 11 April –
  - American cellist Charlotte Moorman uses 18 helium-filled baloons to float above the Sydney Opera House at heights between 10 and 15 metres while continuing to play the cello during the Australian-American Festival.
  - Queen commence a five-state tour of Australia with a concert at the Perth Entertainment Centre, as part of their international Night at the Opera Tour.
- 27 April – Xavier Herbert is announced as the winner of the 1975 Miles Franklin Award for his novel Poor Fellow My Country.

=== May ===
- May – Christina Stead's novel Miss Herbert (The Suburban Wife) is published in the United States.
- 2 May – The fourth annual Australian National Playwrights conference opens at the Australian National University in Canberra.
- 6 May – A letter written by actress June Salter is published in The Sydney Morning Herald in which she criticises Sydney's Hordern Pavilion after having seen Charles Aznavour perform at the venue, describing it as "a not-so-glorified cattle pavilion". After Salter's letter is published, the Royal Agricultural Society announces plans for a new $15 million entertainment centre to replace the Hordern Pavilion and will seek a low interest long term loan from the New South Wales Government.
- 10 May – Dr. Seuss arrives in Australia for a series of engagements in Sydney, Brisbane, Melbourne and Adelaide.
- 22 May – The Australian National Gallery in Canberra purchases a sculpture by Italian artist Amedeo Modigliani for $400,000.
- 27 May – Hero, a new rock opera commissioned by the Australian Opera Company and produced by Grahame Bond opens at Sydney's Seymour Centre, starring Ian Turpie.

=== June ===
- 1 June – Supertramp arrive in Australia for a nine-concert tour of Australia.
- 3 June - Max Merritt opens his Australian concert tour in Melbourne, commencing his first tour of his home country in five years.
- 8 June – The Australian Ballet's Sir Robert Helpmann adaption of The Merry Widow, choreographed by Ronald Hynd has its American premiere at the Kennedy Center in Washington D.C. Featuring guest artist Dame Margot Fonteyn, it's the first performance of a four-week American season (part of Australia's contribution to the United States Bicentenary) and is attended by dignitaries including United States vice president Nelson Rockefeller and Australia's federal minister for defence James Killen.
- 13 June – Australia Council CEO Jean Battersby wins the Henry Lawson Festival of Arts award for the best contribution to the arts.

=== July ===
- 2 July – American singer Dobie Gray arrives in Australia to perform at concerts in Sydney and Melbourne. At a media conference in Sydney he says as a black artist he is concerned about his upcoming five-week tour of South Africa due to the country's apartheid policy.
- 10 July – Daryl Braithwaite confirms Sherbet's manager Roger Davies has been negotiating an international recording contract in the UK, amid the success of the band's single "Howzat."
- 11 July – Pianist Roger Woodward resigns from his role as artistic director at Music Rostrum Australia Ltd citing his belief that the organisation, which was formed in 1973, was no longer working towards its original aims.
- 13 July – New South Wales premier Neville Wran condemns the New South Wales Police vice squad for inspecting works by artists such as Brett Whiteley, Donald Friend and Christopher Boock at an art exhibition in the Sydney suburb of Woollahra. After Wran complains to Assistant Police Commissioner Mervyn Wood for the "unnecessary intrusion into an art exhibition" he states that "the day is long since passed when some display of genitalia, eroticism or copulation is regarded by the average person as offensive."
- 21 July – American country singer Charley Pride arrives in Sydney to commence his second tour of Australia which begins in Canberra.
- 28 July –
  - Tenor Donald Smith annonces his resignation from The Australian Opera citing his lack of trust and faith in the organisation. Smith's son Robin Donald also criticises The Australian Opera. With the three-year option on his three-year contract not being taken up, Donald accuses management of singling him out due to the longstanding conflict with his father.
  - American entertainer Dinah Shore arrives in Australia for a seven-day visit, as a guest of the Australian Government and Melbourne's Australian-American Association. Accompanied by Tennessee Ernie Ford, Shore will record two 90-minute television specials at the Sydney Opera House.

=== August ===
- 2 August – Sir Zelman Cowen announces the Utah Foundation will donate $50,000 to The Australian Opera on the condition another $250,000 is raised from other means.
- 16 August – Attorney-General Bob Ellicott officially opens the East Asian and Pacific Copyright Seminar in Sydney, where he suggests that Aboriginal art, music and other forms of cultural expression should have better copyright protection, stating that "Aboriginal communities should be able to control and benefit directly from the commercial exploitation of their traditional designs".

=== September ===
- 3 September – Canberra's daily newspaper The Canberra Times celebrates its 50th anniversary.
- 12 September –
  - Marcia Hines is admitted to St Vincent's Hospital in Sydney suffering from bronchial pneumonia and asthma, after returning from a four-week trip to the United States.
  - Bulgarian violinist Stoika Milanova arrives in Sydney to commence a two-month concert tour managed by the ABC, which will include performing in Melbourne, Brisbane, Rockhampton, Mackay, Townsville and Cairns.
- 14 September – American rock and roll musician Chuck Berry arrives in Sydney to commence an Australian concert tour.
- 30 September – Ron Blair is commissioned by the Old Tote Theatre Company and J. C. Williamson Productions to write a stage play centred around the Dismissal.

=== October ===
- English comedian Dick Emery commences a national tour in Perth.

=== November ===
- November – Thomas Keneally's novel Season in Purgatory is published.
- 29 November – Hundreds of screaming girls clash with police at Sydney Airport as they attempt to catch a glimpse of touring Scottish pop group, the Bay City Rollers who were flying in from Brisbane.

=== 1977 ===
- 21 January 1977 – Brett Whiteley wins the 1976 Archibald Prize with Self Portrait in the Studio.
- 26 April 1977 – David Ireland's novel The Glass Canoe wins the 1976 Miles Franklin Award.

== Film ==
- 1 January – End Play starring George Mallaby and John Waters is released.
- 1 April – Caddie starring Helen Morse and Takis Emmanuel is released.
- 23 April – Three Australian films are entered into the 1976 Cannes Film Festival: Goodbye, Norma Jean (an American-Australian co-production), Fantasm and The Trespassers.
- 9 July – Mad Dog Morgan starring Dennis Hopper, Jack Thompson and David Gulpilil is released.
- 16 July –
  - The Australian Film Awards are held in Melbourne where The Devil's Playground wins five awards. The movie wins the award for best film, Fred Schepisi wins for best screenplay and for best direction while Nick Tate and Simon Burke share the award for best actor. The best actress award is won by Helen Morse for Caddie.
  - The Fourth Wish starring John Meillon and Robert Bettles is released.
- 29 July – Oz, an Australian re-imaging of The Wizard of Oz starring Joy Dunstan is released.
- 4 August – New South Wales Premier Neville Wran announces that the State Government will invest $120,000 in the film The Picture Show Man. To be produced by Joan Long, the film will be the state's first big investment in film making in many years.
- 18 August – The Trespassers starring Judy Morris is released.
- 10 November – Don's Party starring Ray Barrett and Candy Raymond premieres at the Queanbeyan Australian Film Festival.
- 19 November – Storm Boy starring Greg Rowe, Peter Cummins and David Gulpilil is released.
- 16 December –
  - Eliza Fraser starring Susannah York and Trevor Howard is released.
  - Deathcheaters starring John Hargreaves and Grant Page is released.
  - Let the Balloon Go starring Robert Bettles is released.
  - Children's movie Barney starring Brett Maxworthy and featuring Spike Milligan is released, marking Columbia Pictures' first Australian film investment in thirty years. The Sydney premiere of Barney is marred by an encounter between New South Wales police officers and a procession of horsemen who were travelling through the city centre to promote the film. The film's producer David Waddington said the incident occurred due to a communication breakdown.
- 31 December – Break of Day starring Sara Kestleman and Andrew McFarlane premieres.

== Television ==
=== February ===
- 10 February – Tandarra, a sequel to 1975's Cash and Company, debuts on the Seven Network.
- 28 February – Children's series The Lost Islands debuts on the 0-10 Network.

=== March ===
- 2 March – Beat of the City, ABC TV's eight-part serialisation of the Hesba Brinsmead's book debuts.
- 12 March – The Logie Awards of 1976 are held in Melbourne where fictional character Norman Gunstan (played by Garry McDonald) wins the Gold Logie for the Best Male Personality on Australian television, while Denise Drysdale wins the Gold Logie for Best Female Personality on Australian television.

=== April ===
- 12 April – The Australian Broadcasting Control Board releases the results from a survey which tested reactions to a controversial proposal by the Australian Association of National Advertisers that the ABC be permitted to carry advertising. A total of 61% of those surveyed opposed advertisements on ABC TV.

=== May ===
- 21 May – The final edition of No Man's Land goes to air with Channel 9 axing the live women's panel show hosted by Mickie de Stoop, Robyn Miller, Prue MacSween, Carole Browne and Jeanne Pratt. The axing follows the Australian Broadcasting Control Board's questioning of "unsuitable material" and "expressions" used on air by a university lecturer during a discussion on 4 May. De Stoop, the program's producer, takes responsibility for the axing stating: "I'm disappointed. I wish I could blame Channel 9, but it was my fault as producer; I let something go to air that should not have."

=== June ===
- 21 June – The first episode of ABC TV's 26-part adaption of Frank Hardy's controversial novel Power Without Glory debuts to positive feedback from ABC viewers.

=== July ===
- 6 July – It's announced Mike Willesee will be finishing as host of the Seven Network's This Is Your Life.
- 16 July – John Farnham commences hosting an Australian version of British talent show Opportunity Knocks for the Seven Network.
- 21 July – The Seven Network's new Crawfords-produced police series Bluey starring Lucky Grills debuts.
- 28 July – After having been on the air for seven years, The Inventors returns to ABC TV for another season.

=== August ===
- 2 August – Teen program Flashez hosted by Ray Burgess debuts.
- 13 August – The ABC postpones the scheduled debut of its new 13-part ABC TV comedy series Alvin Purple, with the program's executive producer Maurice Murphy accusing the ABC's new chairman Sir Henry Bland of censorship.
- 20 August – Alvin Purple finally debuts on ABC TV. Despite mixed feedback from ABC viewers, it's a ratings success.
- 26 August – Digby Wolfe is announced as the new host of This Is Your Life. Wolfe is signed on for 18 episodes, the first of which will air on the Seven Network on 9 September.

=== September ===
- 2 September – It's revealed ABC chairman Sir Henry Bland had been canvassing the ABC's commissioners regarding a proposal to take Alvin Purple off the air due to a large number of complaints about the show's content. ABC Staff Association president Ian Wynne describes any move against the show as "unwarranted political interference."
- 4 September – ABC chairman Sir Henry Bland issues a statement confirming Alvin Purple would be taken off the air until the next meeting of the Australian Broadcasting Commission on 16 September. This decision leads to weeks of public debate and discussion regarding censorship and political interference with ABC content. One of the ABC's commissioners Marius Webb describes Sir Henry Bland's decision to censor Alvin Purple made it look like he was "a hatchet man" for prime minister Malcolm Fraser. Acting general secretary of Actors' Equity Joan Evatt also describes Bland's decision as "outrageous and ludicrous."
- 10 September – ABC TV in New South Wales and the Australian Capital Territory is intentionally blacked out by ABC staff at 9:15pm who deliberately refuse to show a substitute program in place of the fourth episode of Alvin Purple. ABC chairman Sir Henry Bland criticises the decision, stating: "I'm extremely disappointed that people who profess to be responsible and to provide a public service should be so utterly irresponsible and idiotic."
- 16 September – Sir Henry Bland confirms he and the other ABC commissioners were in unanimous agreement that Alvin Purple should be allowed to return to the air, which averts planned industrial action by ABC staff.
- 21 September – The ABC TV sitcom Who Do You Think You Are? starring Barbara Stephens premieres.

=== October ===
- 2 October – ABC TV's Saturday night talent show Quest '76 debuts hosted by Peter Regan.
- 7 October – The inaugural Sammy Awards are held at the Sydney Opera House with Gary McDonald and Helen Morse winning the gold Sammy awards.
- 24 October – An Australian iteration of The Gong Show debuts on the 0-10 Network, hosted by Tim Evans with judges Jeanne Little, John Michael Howson and Frank Wilson.

=== November ===
- 8 November – The Young Doctors premieres on the Nine Network.
- 15 November – The Sullivans premieres on the Nine Network.
- 22 November – The Seven Network launches its new nightly current affairs program Willesee at Seven hosted by Mike Willesee in an attempt to rival the Nine Network's A Current Affair.

=== December ===
- 23 December – Bruce Gyngell is appointed as the inaugural chairman of the new Australian Broadcasting Tribunal, a regulatory authority overseeing Australian television standards.

== Sport ==
=== January ===
- 4 January –
  - Mark Edmondson wins the Men's singles title at the 1976 Australian Open defeating fellow Australian John Newcombe 6–7, 6–3, 7–6, 6–1.
  - Evonne Cawley wins the Women's singles title at the 1976 Australian Open, defeating Czechoslovakia's Renáta Tomanová 6–2, 6–2.

=== February ===
- 1 February – David Good wins the Tasmanian Open golf tournament.
- 5 February – Australia defeats the West Indies 5–1 in the cricket test series.
- 8 February – Upon arriving in Sydney for an awards presentation, American athlete Jesse Owens endorses a proposal for Sydney to host the 1988 Summer Olympics but says planning should commence now.
- 9 February – Geoff Hunt wins the 1976 Men's World Open Squash Championship in London.

=== March ===
- 1 March – South Australia secures a Sheffield Shield victory in the 1975-76 Sheffield Shield season, after defeating New South Wales at the Sydney Cricket Ground.
- 19 March – A promotions company reportedly loses $20,000 on a failed night of boxing at Sydney's Hordern Pavilion where Gus Mercurio referees two matches, in which Tony Mundine takes just 1 minute and 25 seconds to defeat American Karl Zurheide, while Blakeney Matthews scored a narrow 46-45 points win against American Ray Lunny III.

=== April ===
- 1 April – 22-year-old American boxer Chuck Wilburn suffers a brain hemorrhage after he is knocked out by Australia's Hector Thompson during a ten-round bout at an RSL club in the Sydney suburb of Blacktown. Wilburn dies on 6 April. Wilburn's death prompts a debate about the future of professional boxing in Australia.
- 3 April – The Bart Cummings-trained Vivarchi wins the Golden Slipper Stakes ridden by John Duggan.

=== May ===
- 15 May – The Fiji rugby union team's 1976 tour of Australia gets underway with a tour match at Sydney's Moore Park where Fiji are defeated by Sydney 12-4.

=== June ===
- 12 June – The first rugby union test between the Wallabies and Fiji is held at the Sydney Cricket Ground where Australia defeats the touring side, 22-6.
- 19 June – The second rugby union test between the Wallabies and Fiji is held at Ballymore in Brisbane where Fiji are defeated 21-9.
- 26 June – The third and final rugby union test between the Wallabies and Fiji is held at the Sydney Cricket Ground. Fiji is again defeated by Australia 27-17 but violent on-field brawls and a walk off by Fijian players makes for a controversial finish to the 1976 Fiji rugby union tour of Australia.

=== July ===
- 2 July – Australia's Evonne Cawley is defeated by American Chris Evert in the women's singles final 6–3, 4–6, 8–6 at the 1976 Wimbledon Championships.
- 4 July – Australian International Olympic Committee representative David McKenzie condemns the proposed restrictions on Taiwan's athletes at the 1976 Summer Olympics in Montreal, accusing Canada of breaching an undertaking it gave during their application to host the Games if it didn't permit Taiwanese athletes to compete as the Republic of China.
- 12 July – Australian swimmer Linda McGill is seriously injured in a car accident in Queensland.
- 15 July – Brisbane is announced as the host city for the 1982 Commonwealth Games.
- 17 July – As flag bearer, sprinter Raelene Boyle becomes the first woman to lead the Australian Olympic team out at an opening ceremony as the 1976 Summer Olympics commence in Montreal, Canada.
- 20 July – Stephen Holland wins bronze, and Australia's only swimming medal, at the 1976 Summer Olympics placing third in the men's 1500 metre freestyle final.
- 26 July – Australia wins their second medal of the 1976 Summer Olympics with the equestrian team consisting of Bill Roycroft, his son Wayne Roycroft, Merv Bennett and Denis Pigott winning bronze by placing third in the team eventing.
- 27 July –
  - John Bertrand wins bronze in the Finn sailing event at the 1976 Summer Olympics.
  - Ian Brown and Ian Ruff win bronze in the 470 sailing event at the 1976 Summer Olympics.
  - Citing Australia's refusal to allow teams from South Africa, Taiwan and Rhodesia to compete, the World Archery Federation votes against holding the 1977 World Archery Championships in Canberra. However, the championships are quickly handed back to Australia after it was discovered the 17-15 vote was invalid because three of the 35 delegates qualified to vote had abstained, which meant the vote hadn't reached the required "simple majority."
- 28 July – Raelene Boyle is automatically disqualified after two false starts in the semi-finals of the Women's 200 metres at the 1976 Summer Olympics, which ends her eight-year pursuit of an Olympic gold medal.
- 30 July –
  - The Australia men's national field hockey team are defeated by New Zealand in the gold medal match at the 1976 Summer Olympics. However, the result secures Australia's only silver medal and the highest ranked medal at the 1976 Summer Olympics. After winning the silver medal, Australian hockey captain Robert Haigh is selected to carry the Australian flag at the closing ceremony.
  - Five top-ranked white South African squash players arrive in Melbourne and go into hiding prior to competing in the inaugural Women's World Open Squash Championships in Brisbane in August, followed by the Australian titles in Sydney. The venues where the players will play in a series of warm up matches is being kept secret with officials fearing anti-apartheid demonstrations if details are known.
- 31 July – Victor Anderson wins the men's national marathon title, clocking 2:23:28.6 in Sydney.

=== August ===
- 1 August – For the first time since 1936, Australia finishes an Olympic Games without winning a gold medal. The team returns home from the 1976 Summer Olympics in Montreal with just five medals - one silver and four bronze. Australia's poor performance leads to much debate and discussion.
- 2 August – Prince Philip condemns the proposed government inquiry into Australia's performance at the Olympics, describing a potential inquest reviewing the team's performance as "deplorable" and "pathetic."

=== September ===
- 4 September – 68-year-old Don Bradman and 71-year-old Bill O'Reilly play in a cricket match in Bowral, New South Wales to assist the local cricket team in the reopening of their revamped oval.
- 18 September – Minor premiers Manly defeats Parramatta 13–10 in the NSWRFL Grand Final at the Sydney Cricket Ground, winning the 1976 NSWRFL season. Newtown finish in last position, claiming the wooden spoon.
- 25 September – Hawthorn defeat North Melbourne by 30 points in the 1976 VFL grand final.

=== October ===
- 2 October – The Tommy Smith-trained Great Lover wins the AJC Derby at Randwick, ridden by Kevin Langby.
- 3 October – Australia's Bob Morris and Britain's John Fitzpatrick claim victory in the 1976 Hardie-Ferodo 1000 at the Mount Panorama Circuit in Bathurst, New South Wales.
- 16 October – The Colin Hayes-trained How Now wins the Caulfield Cup, ridden by John Stocker.
- 23 October – The Geoff Murphy-trained Surround wins the Cox Plate, ridden by Peter Cook.
- 31 October – American Jack Nicklaus wins his fifth Australian Open golf championship defeating fellow American Curtis Strange.

=== November ===
- 2 November – Van der Hum ridden by Bob Skelton wins the Melbourne Cup.

=== December ===
- 29 December – Ballyhoo takes line honours and Piccolo wins on handicap in the Sydney to Hobart Yacht Race.

== Births ==
- 9 January – Amy Gillett (died 2005), cyclist
- 18 January – Damien Leith, singer
- 3 February – Isla Fisher, actress and author
- 13 February – Bree Walters, actress
- 17 February – Matthew Lappin, Australian rules footballer
- 19 February – Travis Denney, badminton player
- 20 February – Johanna Beisteiner, classical guitarist
- 24 February – Bradley McGee, cyclist
- 28 February – David Bradbury, politician
- 25 March – Naomi Young, synchronized swimmer
- 16 April – David Lyons, actor
- 28 April – Paul Cleary, middle-distance runner
- 27 May – Bianca Netzler, field hockey player
- 4 June – Kasey Chambers, singer
- 21 June – Nigel Lappin, Australian rules footballer
- 22 July – Liam Renton, radio, TV and podcast personality
- 6 August
  - Adam Ritson, rugby league player
  - Shaun Timmins, rugby league player
- 24 August - Alex O'Loughlin, actor
- 27 August – Mark Webber, Formula 1 driver
- 1 September – Marcos Ambrose, racing driver
- 7 September – Carmel Bakurski, field hockey defender
- 9 September – Mick Blue, adult entertainer
- 15 September – Brett Kimmorley, Rugby league footballer
- 7 November – Mark Philippoussis, tennis player
- 8 November – Brett Lee, cricketer
- 18 November – Matt Welsh, swimmer
- 28 November – Ryan Kwanten, actor and comedian
- 30 November – Gail Miller, water polo player
- 6 December – Paul Crake, racing cyclist
- 31 December – Craig Reucassel, comedian

== Deaths ==
=== January ===
- 2 January – George Enticknap, politician (b. 1894)
- 26 January – Alfred Jacobs, medical practitioner (b. 1897)

=== February ===
- 8 February – Gladys Moncrieff, singer (b. 1892)
- 20 February – Martin Hanson, politician (b. 1923)

=== March ===
- 7 March – Richard Dixon, Communist Party official (b. 1905)
- 24 March – David Fenbury, public servant (b. 1916)

=== April ===
- 12 April – Sir William Walkley, businessman (b. 1896)
- 20 April – Thomas Simpson Crawford, politician (b. 1875)
- 26 April – Colin Bednall, journalist and television executive (b. 1913)
- 29 April – Leslie Joseph Hooker, real estate entrepreneur (b. 1903)

=== May ===
- 12 May – Bettie Fisher, musician and theatre manager (b. c. 1939)
- 20 May – Bobby Pearce, rower (b. 1905)
- 21 May – Harold Blair, singer and activist (b. 1924)
- 26 May – Edgar Moon, tennis player (b. 1904)
- 31 May – Max Ruddock, politician (b. 1914)

=== June ===
- 15 June – Edward Holbrook Derrick, pathologist (b. 1898)
- 17 June – Richard Casey, Baron Casey, 16th Governor-General of Australia (b. 1890)
- 22 June – Jessie Robertson, radio broadcaster (b. 1909)
- 24 June – Winifred Burston, pianist (b. 1889)
- 27 June – Elsie Hall, pianist (b. 1877) (died in South Africa)

=== July ===
- 3 July – Joe Calcraft, politician (b. 1929)

=== August ===
- 10 August – Bert Oldfield, cricketer (b. 1894)

=== September ===
- 23 September – Eric Costa, politician (b. 1900)
- 28 September – Peter Crimmins, Australian rules footballer (Hawthorn) (b. 1943)

=== October ===
- 13 October – Ivor Greenwood, politician (b. 1926)
- 21 October – Ida Browne, geologist and palaeontologist (b. 1900)
- 23 October – Ian Mudie, poet and author (b. 1911)
- 29 October – John Keith McCarthy, public servant (b. 1905)

=== December ===
- 6 December – Raymond Hanson, composer (b. 1913)
- 16 December – Charles P. Mountford, anthropologist (b. 1890)
- 23 December – Frank Headlam, air force officer (b. 1914)

== See also ==
- 1976 in Australian television
- List of Australian films of 1976
