= 1977 in Australia =

- Monarch: Elizabeth II
- Governor-General: Sir John Kerr, then Sir Zelman Cowen
- Prime minister: Malcolm Fraser
- Population: 14,033,083
- Australian of the Year: Raigh Roe and Murray Tyrrell
- Elections: WA, Referendum, NT, SA, QLD, Federal

The following lists events that happened during 1977 in Australia.

- Decades: 1950s; 1960s; 1970s; 1980s; 1990s
- See also: 1977 in Australian television; 1977 in Australian literature; Other events of 1977; Federal election; Timeline of Australian history

== Incumbents ==
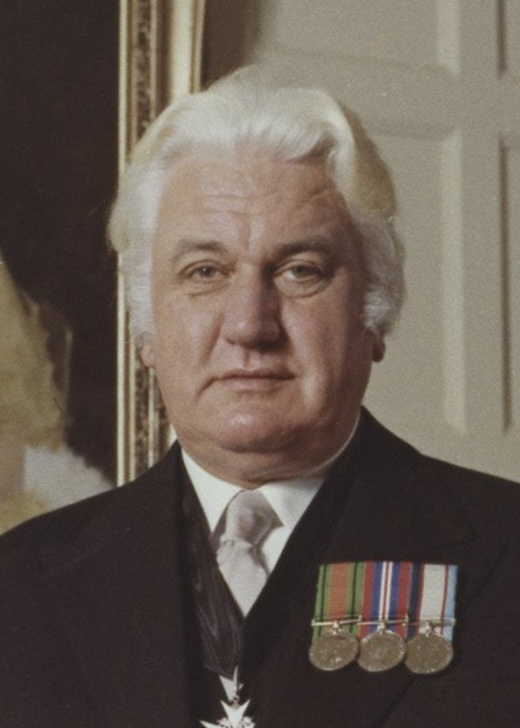
Sir John Kerr

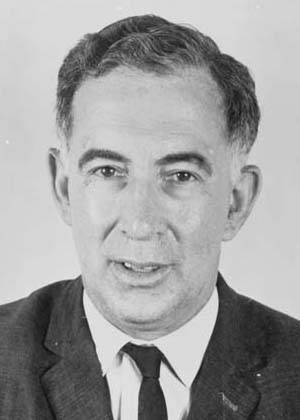
Sir Zelman Cowen

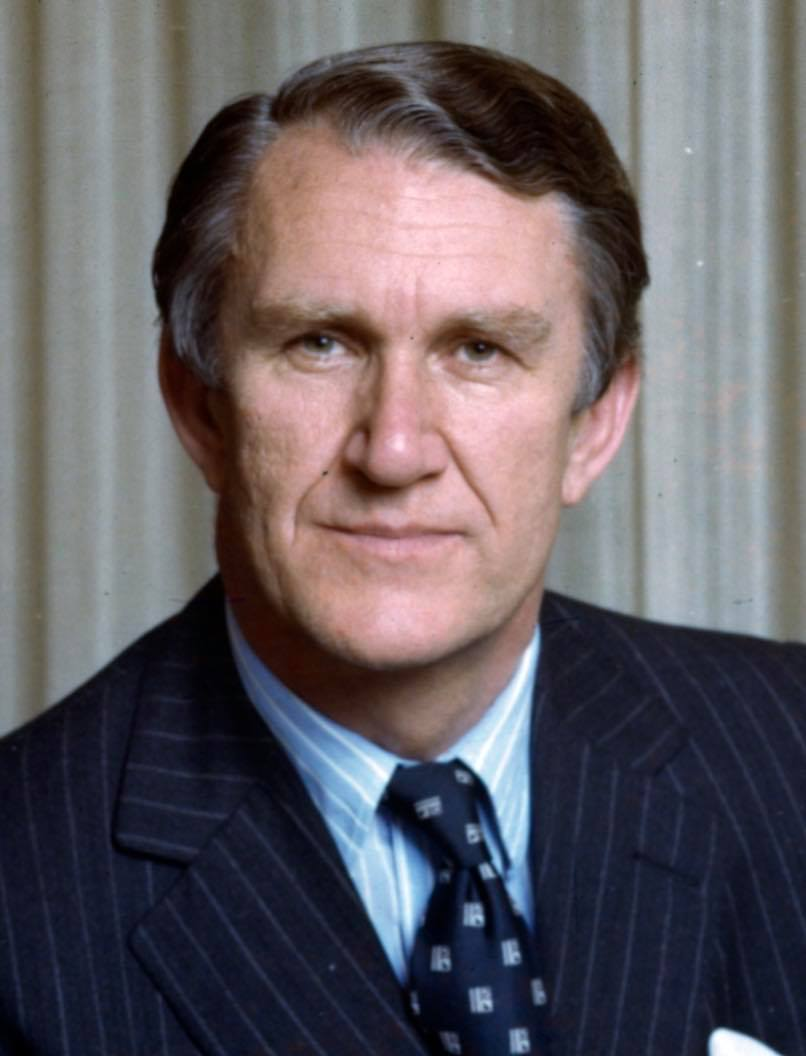
Malcolm Fraser

- Monarch – Elizabeth II
- Governor-General – Sir John Kerr (until 8 December), then Sir Zelman Cowen
- Prime Minister – Malcolm Fraser
  - Deputy Prime Minister – Doug Anthony
  - Opposition Leader – Gough Whitlam (until 22 December), then Bill Hayden
- Chief Justice – Sir Garfield Barwick

=== State and territory leaders ===
- Premier of New South Wales – Neville Wran
  - Opposition Leader – Sir Eric Willis (until 16 December), then Peter Coleman
- Premier of Queensland – Joh Bjelke-Petersen
  - Opposition Leader – Tom Burns
- Premier of South Australia – Don Dunstan
  - Opposition Leader – David Tonkin
- Premier of Tasmania – Bill Neilson (until 1 December), then Doug Lowe
  - Opposition Leader – Max Bingham
- Premier of Victoria – Rupert Hamer
  - Opposition Leader – Clyde Holding (until 29 June), then Frank Wilkes
- Premier of Western Australia – Sir Charles Court
  - Opposition Leader – Colin Jamieson
- Majority Leader of the Northern Territory – Goff Letts (until 12 August), then Paul Everingham
  - Opposition Leader – Jon Isaacs (from 21 September)

=== Governors and administrators ===
- Governor of New South Wales – Sir Roden Cutler
- Governor of Queensland – Sir Colin Hannah (until 20 March), then Sir James Ramsay (from 22 April)
- Governor of South Australia – Sir Douglas Nicholls (until 30 April), then Sir Keith Seaman (from 1 September)
- Governor of Tasmania – Sir Stanley Burbury
- Governor of Victoria – Sir Henry Winneke
- Governor of Western Australia – Sir Wallace Kyle
- Administrator of Norfolk Island – Desmond O'Leary

== Events ==
=== January ===
- 1 January – Six hikers who went missing in Lamington National Park on 27 December 1976 are found safe and well. They had been attempting to locate the site of the 1937 Airlines of Australia Stinson crash which occurred on 18 February 1937.
- 5 January – The Connellan air disaster takes place which is Australia's only aircraft suicide attack. Carried out by a disgruntled former employee of Connellan Airways, the attack claims the lives of five people including the pilot.
- 10 January – The Easey Street murders take place, in which two women were raped and stabbed to death in their home in the inner-Melbourne suburb of Collingwood. It was not until September 2024 that a suspect was arrested in Italy in relation to the murders.
- 18 January – Australia experiences its worst railway disaster at Granville, near Sydney, in which 83 people died.

=== February ===
- 1 February – The Federal Court of Australia began to exercise its jurisdiction.
- 6 February – Silver Jubilee of Elizabeth II's accession as Queen of Australia.
- 7 February – 418 refugees of the Vietnam War arrive in Melbourne. The refugees, from Vietnam, Cambodia and Laos, left refugee camps around Bangkok for the largest airlift of war victims from Thailand.
- 27 February – ABBA arrive in Australia for their live concert tour around the country starting at the Sydney Showground.

=== March ===
- 8 March:
  - The Federal Government holds a reception in Canberra for Queen Elizabeth II and Prince Philip, Duke of Edinburgh as they begin the Silver Jubilee tour of Australia.
  - The TAB announces the first-ever legal betting on VFL football, which came into operation on 2 April.
- 9 March — Queen Elizabeth II arrives in Brisbane as part of her Silver Jubilee goodwill tour.
- 13 March – ABBA In Australia tour concludes.
- 15 March:
  - The former Australian consul to Timor Jim Dunn prepares to testify to the United States Congress on Indonesian atrocities. The Indonesian Foreign Minister Adam Malik responds by threatening that his Government would allow "demonstrations and other mass actions" against the Australian Embassy to continue if further agitation against alleged Indonesian atrocities were allowed.
  - Foreign Minister Andrew Peacock presents a 24-page speech to Federal Parliament in which he outlines a new direction in foreign policies based on Australia's richness in a world of want. He says population and resources would be central future policies, as well as making attacks on Soviet Union military expansion.
  - Federal Cabinet approves an agreement with the United States for the construction of the controversial Omega navigation station at a predicted cost of $15 million.
- 31 March – The Conciliation and Arbitration Commission’s wage decision is handed down. The Commission indicates it would hold an inquiry into various aspects of wage fixation. The Commission introduces a $5.70 a week increase on prices, prompting Federal Treasurer Phillip Lynch to say that the decision would retard the fight against inflation.

=== April ===
- 13 April – The Premiers' Conference is held in Canberra where all governments commit to a three-month prices and wages freeze.

=== May ===
- 15 May – The Australian Democrats is launched by former Liberal MP Don Chipp at Melbourne Town Hall.
- 21 May – The 1977 Australian referendum is held. Questions on Senate casual vacancies, referendums and retirement of judges are passed. A question on simultaneous elections for the House of Representatives and the Senate fails. A plebiscite to decide Australia's national song is won by "Advance Australia Fair".
- 24 May:
  - United States president Jimmy Carter gives the Australian Government his personal assurance that US agencies (in particular the Central Intelligence Agency) were not engaged in improper activities in Australia, an issue that had resurfaced in the espionage trial of Christopher Boyce in the United States. Fraser included this information in a statement to the House of Representatives on 24 May.
  - John Howard tables a white paper on the future of the manufacturing industry in parliament. The paper noted that despite the growth of mining, manufacturing still employed more than 1.3 million people in 1975, of whom 0.5 million had been born overseas. Manufacturing depended substantially on tariff protection and other government assistance, as well as facing ever-increasing competition from other countries, particularly in Asia.

=== June ===
- 15 June – The Gleneagles Agreement is unanimously approved by the Commonwealth of Nations at a meeting at Gleneagles, Auchterarder, Scotland. Commonwealth Presidents and Prime Ministers agree, as part of their support for the international campaign against apartheid, to discourage contact and competition between their sportsmen and sporting organisations, teams or individuals from South Africa.
- 22 June:
  - The Uniting Church in Australia is formed following the union of the majority of Presbyterian, Methodist and Congregational Union churches in Australia.
  - Prime Minister Malcolm Fraser meets with United States president Jimmy Carter in Washington. Fraser is impressed by Carter 'as a decisive man' who would be 'setting American objectives in the great humanitarian issues'. Carter undertakes to consult Australia before any agreement was concluded with the Soviet Union on arms limitation in the Indian Ocean.

=== July ===
- 1 July – The Office of the Commonwealth Ombudsman is established.
- 15 July – Anti-drugs campaigner Donald Mackay disappears near Griffith, New South Wales. He is presumed to have been murdered.

=== August ===
- 7 August – At the Association of South-East Asian Nations meeting in Kuala Lumpur, prime minister Malcolm Fraser offers ASEAN leaders a package of increased bilateral aid of $250 million, as well as an extra $10 million for joint development projects, but claimed Australia could do nothing in its present economic circumstances to reduce trade barriers against their countries' products.
- 9 August – A board of inquiry into Housing Commission land deals is appointed by the Victorian Government with the power to investigate Cabinet decisions and to call Ministers to give evidence.
- 11 August – A 24-hour strike by postal staff at Melbourne's two biggest parcel centres stops more than 25,000 parcels being handled.
- 15 August – Cabinet decided that Australia would negotiate bilateral safeguards agreements with purchasers covering both present and future use of the uranium. Australia would seek an understanding with other exporters on the application and enforcement of safeguards, but this would not constitute a commercial cartel to control price or quantity.
- 16 August – Federal Treasurer Philip Lynch presents the 1977–78 budget, with a predicted deficit of $2.21 billion. It reduces personal income tax scales from seven to three (32 per cent, 46 per cent and 60 per cent) and also provides personal tax cuts to operate from 1 February 1978.
- 17 August – Federal Treasurer Phillip Lynch addresses the National Press Club of Australia and blames the Arbitration Commission for the lack of improvement in unemployment for its failure to restrain wages through its decisions.
- 21 August – Mail services returns to normal following the end of a national postal dispute.
- 23 August – Cabinet makes its final decisions on uranium mining in Australia, endorsing the main findings of the Fox inquiry unless there were 'compelling reasons' for departing from them. It was agreed that mining could proceed, subject to environmental controls and a stringent nuclear safeguards regime. The Ranger Uranium Mine could be developed without further environmental assessment, but the other two mines in the Alligator River region – Jabiluka and Koongarra – would not be approved for a considerable time. Cabinet also agreed on the staged establishment of Kakadu National Park, although the Ranger, Jabiluka and Koongarra uranium leases were to be excluded from it.
- 24 August – Australia's first 7-Eleven convenience store opens in the Melbourne suburb of Oakleigh.

=== September ===
- 4 September – The Queensland Government bans street marches and demonstrations.
- 6 September:
  - Victoria experiences a statewide 24-hour stoppage of train, tram and tramway bus services due to a strike by 20,000 public transport workers – the third strike in a month.
  - Federal Attorney-General Bob Ellicott quits the Fraser ministry after a row with Cabinet over the conspiracy case against former Labor Ministers. Senator Peter Durack is appointed in his place.
- 15 September:
  - The ACTU congress resolves to ban the mining and export of uranium from mid-November unless the Government agrees to hold a referendum on the issue. The referendum proposal is not favoured by the Australian Labor Party, most of whose parliamentary leaders are inclined to support mining.
  - The Indian High Commissioner Shri Jagdish Chand Ajmani's military attaché Colonel Iqbal Singh and his wife are attacked by a member of the Indian Ananda Marga sect.
- 17 September – The 1977 South Australian state election is held. The incumbent Australian Labor Party led by Don Dunstan is returned to power.

=== October ===
- 8 October – The Tasman Bridge in Hobart re-opens after repair to the damage sustained in the Tasman Bridge disaster when the bridge was struck by the bulk ore carrier MV Lake Illawarra on 5 January 1975.
- 19 October:
  - An employee of Air India’s Melbourne office is stabbed by a man who left a threatening letter, allegedly from the Ananda Marga-affiliated Universal Proutist Revolutionary Federation.
  - Cabinet decides to review the management of explosives by Commonwealth agencies and to provide 203 more Commonwealth police for diplomatic security work, while foreign missions in Australia are urged to upgrade their security.
- 27 October – Prime Minister Malcolm Fraser announces that the 1977 Australian federal election will be held on 10 December.

=== November ===
- 12 November – The 1977 Queensland state election is held, with the Liberal-National coalition led by Joh Bjelke-Petersen gaining their fourth successive victory.
- 18 November – Phillip Lynch resigns as the federal treasurer and is succeeded by John Howard.
- 30 November – The High Court of Australia rules in the case of Cridland v Federal Commissioner of Taxation that a group of university students avoiding tax by claiming to be farmers were acting legally under provisions of the Income Tax Assessment Act 1936.

=== December ===
- 1 December – Bill Neilson resigns as Premier of Tasmania to become Australia's agent-general in London and is succeeded by Doug Lowe.
- 8 December – Sir Zelman Cowen replaced Sir John Kerr as Governor-General of Australia.
- 10 December – The 1977 Australian federal election is held. Malcolm Fraser's Liberal/National Country coalition government is re-elected with a slightly reduced majority, defeating the Labor Party led by former Prime Minister Gough Whitlam.
- 22 December – Bill Hayden and Lionel Bowen replace Gough Whitlam and Tom Uren in the ALP leadership.

== Arts and literature ==
- 16 December 1977 – Kevin Connor wins the Archibald Prize with Robert Klippel.
- 26 April 1978 – Ruth Park's novel Swords and Crowns and Rings wins the 1977 Miles Franklin Award.

== Film ==
- 17 August – The Getting of Wisdom

== Television ==
- 3 April – When Countdown celebrated 100 episodes, host Molly Meldrum feels tired and emotional prompting regulars Daryl Braithwaite and John Paul Young to both step in and host the remainder of the show.
- Soap operas Bellbird, Number 96, and The Box, are all cancelled.
- 19 November – On Countdown, Molly Meldrum interviews Prince Charles.
- 28 November – The first episode of Cop Shop airs on the Seven Network.
- 6 December – The first episode of The Restless Years airs on the 0-10 Network.
- 22 December – The final episode of the 0-10 Network's long-running drama Number 96 airs for the final time in Melbourne (note: 11 August in Sydney), having first aired in 1972.
- 23 December – The final episode of ABC TV's long running drama Bellbird airs for the final time, having first aired in 1967.

== Sport ==
- 28 February – Western Australia win the 1976–77 Sheffield Shield season.
- 12 March – The Centenary Test commences between England and Australia at the Melbourne Cricket Ground.
- 20 March – Australia is represented by nine long-distance runners (all men), including Robert de Castella, at the fifth IAAF World Cross Country Championships in Düsseldorf, West Germany. Steve Austin is Australia's best finisher, claiming the 15th spot (38:26.0) in the race over 12,3 kilometres.
- 2 April – The National Soccer League kicks off, as the first league of any football code to become national with West Adelaide defeating Canberra City 3–1 in the opening game at Manuka Oval in Canberra.
- 7 May – Hawthorn set two VFL records when they kick 41 behinds and have a total of 66 scoring shots against St Kilda. These totals remain six ahead of the second-most behinds and scoring shots.
- 6 August – Robert Wallace wins the men's national marathon title, clocking 2:20:11.2 in Cressy, Tasmania.
- England defeat a weakened Australia team 3–0 in The Ashes test series
- 17 September – St. George and minor premiers Parramatta play a 9–9 draw after 100 minutes in the 1977 NSWRL Grand Final. It is the first Grand Final to be tied after 100 minutes including extra time. Newtown finish in last position, claiming their second straight wooden spoon.
- 24 September
  - St. George thrash Parramatta 22–0 in the 1977 NSWRL Grand Final replay.
  - North Melbourne and Collingwood play in the 1977 VFL grand final which becomes only the second VFL Grand Final draw in history.
- 1 October – North Melbourne defeat Collingwood in the 1977 Grand Final replay.
- 2 October – In motor racing Ford team-mates Allan Moffat and Colin Bond finish side by side to complete a 1–2 Formation Finish at the Bathurst 1000.
- 1 November – Gold and Black wins the Melbourne Cup.
- 29 December – Kialoa II wins the Sydney to Hobart Yacht Race.

== Births ==
- 1 January – Craig Reucassel, comedian and television host
- 2 January – Jai Rowell, politician
- 6 January – Shane Rigon, rugby league player
- 17 January – Leigh Whannell, actor, filmmaker
- 8 February – Barry Hall, footballer
- 14 February – Cadel Evans, cyclist
- 14 February- Jim Jefferies, comedian
- 21 February – Ben Ikin, rugby league player
- 24 February – Jason Akermanis, Australian Rules footballer
- 25 February – Joanne Banning, field hockey striker
- 1 March – Fiona Scott, politician
- 15 March – Adrian Burnside, baseball player
- 24 March – Darren Lockyer, Rugby league footballer
- 31 March – Garth Tander, racing driver
- 12 April – Sarah Monahan, actress
- 6 May – Chantelle Newbery, Olympic champion diver
- 10 May – Chas Licciardello, comedian
- 14 May – Ada Nicodemou, actress
- 24 May – Katie Noonan, new age musician/soprano (george)
- 7 June – Preston Campbell, rugby league player
- 11 June – Geoff Ogilvy, golfer
- 20 June – Aaron Moule, rugby league player
- 6 July – Con Blatsis, Australian footballer
- 10 July – Schapelle Corby, drug trafficker
- 12 July – Soa Palelei, mixed martial artist
- 26 July – Rebecca St. James, Australian-born Christian musician
- 6 August – Rebecca Maddern, journalist and television host
- 11 August – Byron Pickett, Australian Rules footballer
- 13 August – Michael Klim, swimmer
- 14 August – Justin Anlezark, shot putter
- 15 August – Anthony Rocca, Australian Rules footballer
- 25 August – Lawrence Leung, comedian, writer, and director
- 31 August – Craig Nicholls, rock musician and songwriter
- 1 September – Henry Collins, boxer
- 6 September – Peter Wakefield, boxer
- 23 October – Brad Haddin, cricketer
- 30 October – Charmian Faulkner, missing toddler
- 11 November – Ben Hollioake, Australian-born England cricketer (d. 2002)
- 16 November – Gigi Edgley, actress
- 6 December – Peta Gallagher, field hockey striker
- 30 December
  - Grant Balfour, Major League Baseball pitcher
  - Scott Lucas, Australian rules footballer

== Deaths ==
- 14 January – Peter Finch (born 1916), actor
- 18 April – Ernest Henry Woollacott (born 1888), minister, social welfare analyst and temperance advocate
- 23 April – John McDonald (born 1898), Premier of Victoria (1950–1952)
- 22 August – Rex Connor (born 1907), politician

== See also ==
- 1977 in Australian television
- List of Australian films of 1977
