= 1976 in Australian television =

This is a list of Australian television-related events in 1976.

== Events ==
- 1 January – Australian children's television series The Lost Islands screens on The 0-10 Network. Co-produced by The 0-10 Network and Paramount Pictures and distributed by CBS Television, the series had a modest following in Australia, but was sold well to oversea markets such as the UK, Canada, the United States, France, New Zealand, Israel, South Africa, West Germany, Italy, Sri Lanka and various parts of Europe, like The Netherlands.
- 9 February – Australian game show The Celebrity Game returns to The 0-10 Network with a brand new, revamped version. The original host of the series, Bert Newton, is replaced by English actor and singer Mike Preston.
- 15 April – Two American sitcoms, Welcome Back, Kotter and Barney Miller, both air on Seven Network on the same day.
- July – ABC, Seven Network and Nine Network have combined forces to provide the coverage of the Olympic Games from Montreal, Quebec. The opening and closing ceremonies are telecast live, with highlights packages screening each evening.
- 12 July – Australian wildlife series In the Wild presented by Harry Butler debuts on ABC.
- 2 August – A brand new Australian youth pop program called Flashez hosted by Ray Burgess and Mike Meade premieres on ABC.
- 2 August – Australian police drama Bluey debuts on Seven Network.
- 13 August – Australian sitcom Alvin Purple, based on the two sex movies, premieres on ABC.
- 3 September – Australian prison comedy series The Bluestone Boys makes it premiere on The 0-10 Network. The series only ran for a total of 26 episodes and was cancelled as it was not particularly successful.
- 5 November – Chopper Squad an Australian drama series premieres on The 0-10 Network.
- 8 November – A brand new Australia hospital drama from Grundy Organisation The Young Doctors screens on Nine Network. It was later broadcast in various different countries such as the UK, USA, France, Spain and Ireland.
- 15 November – Crawford Productions's brand new WWII Australian drama television series The Sullivans premieres on Nine Network.
- 25 November – Final episode of the Australian sitcom Alvin Purple is broadcast on the ABC.
- 26 November – RTS5A is launched, serving Loxton, Renmark and the Riverland in South Australia.
- November – Mike Walsh has announced that he will be moving his own daytime show from The 0-10 Network to Nine Network starting from early 1977.
- 1 December – Final episode of the Australian children's series The Lost Islands airs on The 0-10 Network.
- The 0-10 Network airs the final episode of its Australian police drama series Matlock Police.

== Debuts ==
Program	Network	Debut date
The Lost Islands	The 0-10 Network	1 January
The Celebrity Game	The 0-10 Network	9 February
Tandarra	Seven Network	10 February
Luke's Kingdom	Nine Network	7 April
In the Wild	ABC	12 July
The Inventors	ABC	28 July
Bluey	Seven Network	2 August
Flashez	ABC	2 August
Alvin Purple	ABC	13 August
The Bluestone Boys	The 0-10 Network	3 September
Chopper Squad	The 0-10 Network	5 November
The Young Doctors	Nine Network	8 November
Solo One	Seven Network	8 November
The Outsiders	ABC	9 November
The Sullivans	Nine Network	15 November
Ask the Leyland Brothers	Nine Network	1976
The Daryl and Ossie Cartoon Show	Nine Network	1976

=== New international programming ===
- 2 January – (Canada) Swiss Family Robinson (1974) (ABC)
- 22 January – (United States) S.W.A.T. (Nine Network)
- 9 February – (United States) Partridge Family 2200 A.D. (Seven Network)
- 9 February – (United States) The Invisible Man (1975) (Nine Network)
- 9 February – (United States) Starsky and Hutch (Nine Network)
- 17 February – (United States) Switch (The 0-10 Network)
- 25 March – (United Kingdom) Wodehouse Playhouse (ABC)
- 6 April – (United States) Chico and the Man (The 0-10 Network)
- 15 April – (United States) Welcome Back, Kotter (Seven Network)
- 15 April – (United States) Barney Miller (Seven Network)
- 26 April – (United States) Laverne and Shirley (Nine Network)
- 17 May – (United Kingdom) Doctor on the Go (Seven Network)
- 20 June/4 September – (United States) Westwind (20 June: The 0-10 Network - Melbourne, 4 September: The 0-10 Network - Sydney)
- 22 June – (United States) The Dumplings (The 0-10 Network)
- 22 June – (United States) The Bob Crane Show (The 0-10 Network)
- 15 July – (United States) Barbary Coast (The 0-10 Network)
- 24 July – (United States) Bert D'Angelo/Superstar (Seven Network)
- 2 August – (Canada) Lorne Greene's Last of the Wild (ABC)
- 3 August – (United Kingdom) Microbes and Men (ABC)
- 8 August – (United Kingdom) How Green Was My Valley (ABC)
- 8 September – (United Kingdom) The Liver Birds (ABC)
- 1 November – (Canada) The Hilarious House of Frightenstein (The 0-10 Network)
- 4 November – (United Kingdom) I Didn't Know You Cared (ABC)
- 7 November – (United States) Fay (Nine Network)
- 7 November – (United States) Three for the Road (The 0-10 Network)
- 9 November – (United Kingdom) Space: 1999 (Seven Network)
- 9 November – (United States) Wait Till Your Father Gets Home (Seven Network)
- 9 November – (United States) On the Rocks (Seven Network)
- 10 November – (United Kingdom) Carry on Laughing (Seven Network)
- 10 November – (United States) Doc (Seven Network)
- 10 November – (United Kingdom) Father Brown (Seven Network)
- 8 December – (United Kingdom) The Adventures of Sir Prancelot (ABC)
- 14 December – (United Kingdom) Notorious Woman (The 0-10 Network)
- 20 December – (United Kingdom) Days of Hope (ABC)
- 29 December – (United Kingdom) The Lotus Eaters (ABC)
- (United States) The New Scooby-Doo Movies (Nine Network)

== Television shows ==
=== 1950s ===
- Mr. Squiggle and Friends (1959–1999).

=== 1960s ===
- Four Corners (1961–present).
- It's Academic (1968–1978).

=== 1970s ===
- Super Flying Fun Show (1970–1979).
- Hey Hey It's Saturday (1971–1999, 2009–2010).
- Young Talent Time (1971–1988).
- Matlock Police (1971–1976).
- Spyforce (1971–1976).
- A Current Affair (1971–1978).
- Countdown (1974–1987).
- Rush (1974–1976).
- The Last of the Australians (1975–1976).
- The Don Lane Show (1975–1983).
- This Is Your Life (1975–1980).
- The Lost Islands (1976).
- Flashez (1976–1977).
- In the Wild (1976–1981).
- The Celebrity Game (1976–1977).
- Alvin Purple (1976).
- Bluey (1976–1977).

== Ending this year ==
Date	Show	Channel	Debut
4 February	Shannon's Mob	Nine Network	27 October 1975
21 September	Spyforce	Nine Network	8 August 1971
25 November	Alvin Purple	ABC	13 August 1976
1 December	The Lost Islands	The 0-10 Network	1 January 1976
26 December	Certain Women	ABC	14 February 1973
1976	The Last of the Australians	Nine Network	1975
1976	Matlock Police	The 0-10 Network	1971
1976	Rush	ABC	1974

== See also ==
- 1976 in Australia
- List of Australian films of 1976
