= 1978 in Australia =

- Monarch: Elizabeth II
- Governor-General: Sir Zelman Cowen
- Prime minister: Malcolm Fraser
- Population: 14,192,234
- Australian of the Year: Alan Bond and Galarrwuy Yunupingu
- Elections: NSW

The following lists events that happened during 1978 in Australia.

- Decades: 1950s; 1960s; 1970s; 1980s; 1990s
- See also: 1978 in Australian television; 1978 in Australian literature; Other events of 1978; Timeline of Australian history

== Incumbents ==
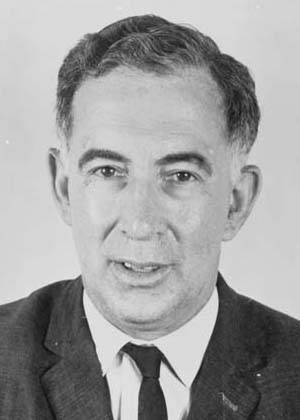
Sir Zelman Cowen

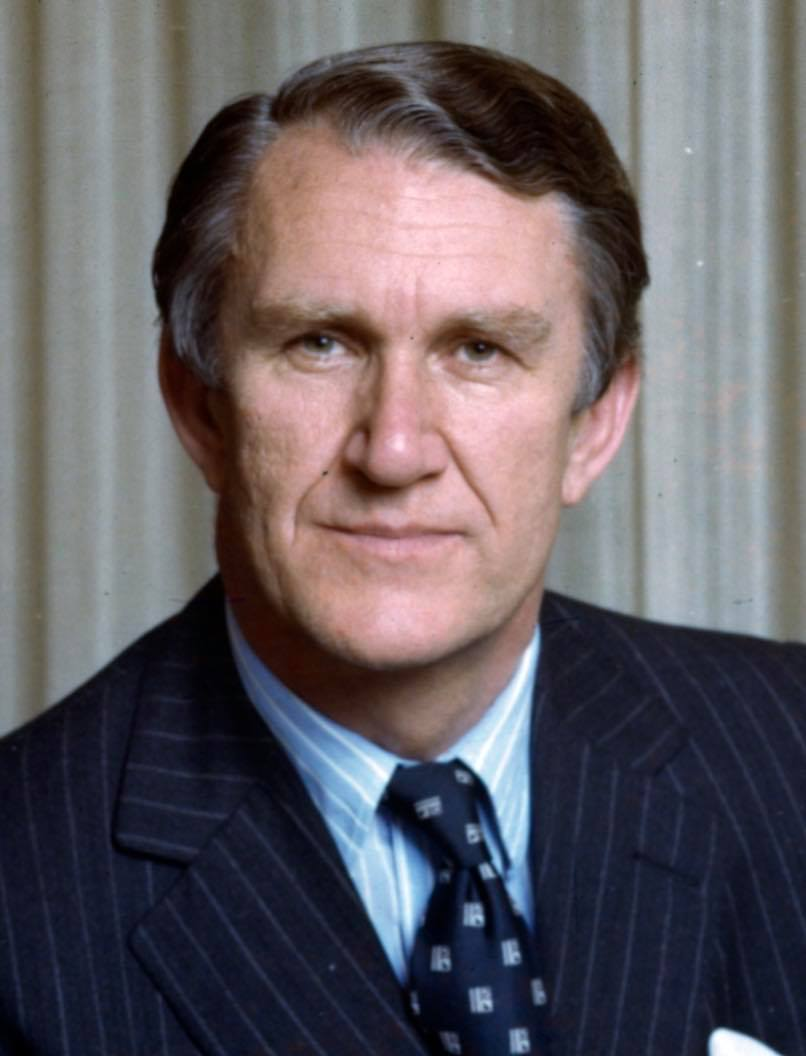
Malcolm Fraser

- Monarch – Elizabeth II
- Governor-General – Sir Zelman Cowen
- Prime Minister – Malcolm Fraser
  - Deputy Prime Minister – Doug Anthony
  - Opposition Leader – Bill Hayden
- Chief Justice – Sir Garfield Barwick

=== State and territory leaders ===
- Premier of New South Wales – Neville Wran
  - Opposition Leader – Peter Coleman (until 7 October), then John Mason
- Premier of Queensland – Joh Bjelke-Petersen
  - Opposition Leader – Tom Burns (until 28 November), then Ed Casey
- Premier of South Australia – Don Dunstan
  - Opposition Leader – David Tonkin
- Premier of Tasmania – Doug Lowe
  - Opposition Leader – Max Bingham
- Premier of Victoria – Rupert Hamer
  - Opposition Leader – Frank Wilkes
- Premier of Western Australia – Sir Charles Court
  - Opposition Leader – Colin Jamieson (until 21 February), then Ron Davies
- Majority Leader/Chief Minister of the Northern Territory – Paul Everingham
  - Opposition Leader – Jon Isaacs

=== Governors and administrators ===
- Governor of New South Wales – Sir Roden Cutler
- Governor of Queensland – Sir James Ramsay
- Governor of South Australia – Sir Keith Seaman
- Governor of Tasmania – Sir Stanley Burbury
- Governor of Victoria – Sir Henry Winneke
- Governor of Western Australia – Sir Wallace Kyle
- Administrator of Norfolk Island – Desmond O'Leary
- Administrator of the Northern Territory – John England (from 1 June)

== Events ==
=== January ===
- 1 January –
  - Another Vietnamese refugee boat arrives at night, from a camp off the Malaysian coast.
  - The Festival of Sydney begins.
  - A jail warder, Victor Sullivan is struck on the head by a prisoner at Parramatta Jail.
- 2 January – Senator Neville Bonner attacks the Queensland Government over delays in its housing reconstruction programme for Mornington Island, which was ravaged by Cyclone Ted more than a year ago.
- 3 January –
  - Bela Csidei, a prominent Sydney businessman, is alleged in the Darwin Magistrates' Court to have been involved in growing marijuana in the Northern Territory.
  - Acting Health Minister Mr McLeay reiterates the Federal Government's election promise to keep the Medibank levy and ceiling at the same level for the next six months.
  - Queensland Premier Joh Bjelke-Petersen announces that he will ask churches throughout Queensland to hold a day of prayer for rain, suggesting a date of 15 January.
- 4 January –
  - The Australian dollar is devalued from 89.4 to 89.2 due to a drop in the US dollar to bring the effect devaluation since November 1976 to 15.3%.
  - Acting Prime Minister Doug Anthony announces that the Federal Government knew that Arab nations operated a blacklist for more than 20 years and that some Australian companies were on it, but that the Government had never been told officially that certain companies were being boycotted.
- 5 January –
  - Corrective Services Commissioner, W. McGeechan, talks 120 maximum security prisoners back into their cells after a 5-hour protest sit-in at Parramatta jail.
  - Aboriginal Senator Neville Bonner makes a complaint to the Queensland State Licensing Commission about the Mount Isa hotel which refused him service on Boxing Day.
  - Immigration and Ethnic Affairs Minister Michael MacKellar reverses a department decision thereby allowing a Uruguayan woman to join her widowed brother, Ruben Molina, in Sydney.
- 18 January – New South Wales Premier Neville Wran meets with prison union officials about their demand that Bathurst Jail be reopened to relieve over crowding and staff shortages in other prisons.

=== February ===
- 13 February – Terrorism arrives in Australia for the very first time with the Sydney Hilton bombing killing 3 people and injuring 9 others.

=== March ===
- 14 March – Stephen Matthews, aged 20, swept from the Natural Bridge off Albany, by a King Wave. Rescued by whale ship, the Cheynes II. First recorded survival of someone swept into the sea at The Gap and Natural Bridge.
- 30 March – Commonwealth Police (Federal Police) begin arresting 180 Greek-Australians said to be involved in a conspiracy to defraud the Department of Social Security.

=== April ===
- 4 April – Cyclone Alby kills 5 people in Western Australia.

=== May ===
- 15 May –
  - Australia's longest-serving prime minister Robert Menzies dies.
  - Australia's first Timezone arcade opens in Perth.

=== June ===
- 24 June – The inaugural Sydney Gay and Lesbian Mardi Gras parade, a gay rights march is held in Oxford Street, Sydney to commemorate the 10th anniversary of the Stonewall Riots in New York.
- 25 June – Trudie Adams disappears from the Surf Life Saving Club in Newport, New South Wales.

=== July ===
- 1 July – The Northern Territory attains self-government; Majority Leader Paul Everingham becomes the inaugural Chief Minister.

=== August ===
- 25 August – Michelle Pope and Stephen Lapthorne disappear. Still missing as of 3 August 2015.

=== October ===
- 7 October – The ALP New South Wales state government of Neville Wran is re-elected with a massively increased majority, leading to his win being dubbed as a "Wranslide".
- 8 October – Australia's Ken Warby sets the world water speed record to 510 km/h (317.60 mph) at Blowering Dam, New South Wales.
- 21 October - Cessna pilot Frederick Valentich disappears while flying over Bass Strait.

=== November ===
- 21 November – Last day of commercial whaling in Australia. No sperm whales caught that day by the chaser ships (Cheynes II, III and IV) operated by the Cheynes Beach Whaling Company at Albany, Western Australia. The last whale caught by an Australian whaling company was the day before, 20 November.

== Arts and literature ==
- Brett Whiteley wins the Archibald Prize with Art, Life and the other thing.
- Jessica Anderson's novel Tirra Lirra By the River wins the Miles Franklin Award.
- Helen Garner becomes the first woman to win the National Book Council Award for her novel Monkey Grip, selected as Book of the Year.

== Film ==
- Blue Fin
- Little Boy Lost

== Sport ==
- 7 March – Western Australia wins the 1977–78 Sheffield Shield season.
- 6 May – Melbourne and St Kilda set a still-standing record VFL/AFL aggregate score of 52.33 (345).
- 1 July – Footscray kick a record VFL score of 33.15 (213) beating the previous record by three points. Kelvin Templeton and Ian Dunstan combine for 22 of the 33 goals.
- 6 August – James Langford wins the men's national marathon title, clocking 2:19:29 in Caboolture.
- 19 September – After a controversial NSWRFL finals series with two draws, Manly thrash Cronulla 16–0 to win their fourth premiership with Graham Eadie dominating. Newtown finish in last position, claiming their third straight and final wooden spoon before their departure from the premiership five years later.
- 30 September – Hawthorn 18.13 (121) defeats North Melbourne 15.13 (103) for its fourth VFL premiership.
- 7 November – Arwon wins the Melbourne Cup.
- 30 December – Apollo claims line honours in the Sydney to Hobart Yacht Race.

== Births ==
- 4 January – Paul Licuria, Australian rules footballer
- 14 January – James Mathison, TV host
- 25 January – Jason Johnson, Australian rules footballer
- 1 February – Tim Harding, singer (Hi 5)
- 2 February – Annabel Ellwood, tennis player
- 7 February – Frank Drmic, basketball player
- 8 February – Mick de Brenni, politician
- 16 February – Lance Thompson, rugby league player (d. 2018)
- 1 March – Gavin Woods, water polo player
- 14 March – Karyne Di Marco, hammer thrower
- 18 March – Brooke Hanson, swimmer
- 4 April – Sam Moran, singer (The Wiggles)
- 16 April – Matthew Lloyd, footballer and coach
- 2 June – Luke Williamson, rugby league player
- 30 June – Ben Cousins, AFL Footballer
- 8 August – Kate Ritchie, actress, radio & television personality
- 16 August – Ben Galea, rugby player
- 11 September – Ben Lee, singer-songwriter, guitarist and actor
- 18 September – Melanie Gibbons, politician
- 20 September – Scott Minto, rugby league player
- 22 September – Harry Kewell, soccer player
- 20 October – Michael Johns, Australian singer (d. 2014)
- 25 October – Matt Shirvington, track and field athlete
- November – Allyson McConnell, convicted killer who drowned her two children in Alberta, Canada
- 22 November – Steven King, plays with Geelong Football Club
- 2 December – Peter Moylan, baseball player
- Fiona McFarlane - author

== Deaths ==
- 9 January – Eddie Gilbert, (born 1905), Queensland cricketer
- 5 February – Frank McIver, (born 1904), soccer player and administrator
- 14 May – Sir Robert Menzies, (born 1894), Prime Minister of Australia
- 27 July – Bob Heffron, (born 1890), Premier of New South Wales
- 18 September – Dame Alice Berry, (born 1900), social activist
- 6 October – Johnny O'Keefe, (born 1935), rock and roll singer

== See also ==
- 1978 in Australian television
- List of Australian films of 1978
