= 1977 in Australian television =

This is a list of Australian television-related events in 1977.

== Events ==
- 21 January – Golden West Network is launched in Geraldton as GTW-11 and begins broadcasting. This completes the roll-out of regional commercial television across Australia.
- April – The ABC's long-running music program Countdown celebrates its 100th episode.
- April – The Seven Network successfully bids for exclusive Australian rights to televise the 1980 Olympic Games from Moscow. The network paid $1 million in the deal, outbidding rival offers from ABC and Nine Network.
- 1 April – British sitcom Fawlty Towers debuts on ABC.
- 26 May – Australian satirical radio and television sketch show The Naked Vicar Show premieres on Seven Network.
- October - Nine Network's wartime period soap opera, The Sullivans, premieres on British television when the ITV network begin showing it during daytime. It eventually becomes a regional programme, with each ITV contractor showing it as and when they wished. The most common timeslot used, however, was 12:30-13:00pm on Tuesday and Thursday. The series marks the first of several Australian soap operas to be broadcast by ITV, which continued until the early 00s.
- 5 December – The final episode of the Australian music series Flashez airs on ABC at 5:30pm.
- 6 December – The 0-10 Network screens Australian soap opera The Restless Years.
- 23 December – ABC televises the final episode of its Australian soap opera Bellbird.
- Seven Network televises the VFL Grand Final live to Melbourne for the first time.
- The Federal Government investigates a proposal to establish a domestic satellite system, enabling instant transmission of television and other communications across Australia and in particular to remote areas.
- Australian music series Flashez returns for a new series on ABC now airing at 5:30pm right after Sesame Street for most of the year.
- Gus the Snail (a character who was based on an executive producer who wanted to take over the ABC) makes his very first appearance on the long running Australian children's television series Mr. Squiggle and Friends.

== Debuts ==
Program	Network	Debut date
Blankety Blanks	The 0-10 Network	24 January
The Naked Vicar Show	Seven Network	26 May
Pig in a Poke	ABC	24 July
Kirby's Company	ABC	19 September
Glenview High	Seven Network	27 September
Young Ramsay	Seven Network	30 October
Bobby Dazzler	Seven Network	20 November
Cop Shop	Seven Network	28 November
The Restless Years	The 0-10 Network	6 December
Hotel Story	The 0-10 Network	27 December
The Toothbrush Family	Unknown	1977
Family Feud	Nine Network	1977

=== New international programming ===
- 25 January – (United States) Alice (The 0-10 Network)
- 27 January – (United States) Serpico (Seven Network)
- 31 January – (United States) Charlie's Angels (Nine Network)
- 2 February/23 June – (United States) The Gemini Man (2 February: Nine Network - Melbourne, 23 June: Nine Network - Sydney)
- 3 February – (United Kingdom) The Good Life (1975) (ABC)
- 4 February – (United States) Executive Suite (Seven Network)
- 5 February – (United States) Baa Baa Black Sheep (Nine Network)
- 8 February – (United Kingdom) George and Mildred (ABC)
- 14 February – (United Kingdom) Who Killed Lamb? (ABV-2)
- 16 February – (United Kingdom) The New Avengers (ABC)
- 18 February – (United Kingdom) Poldark (The 0-10 Network)
- 12 March – (United States) Holmes & Yoyo (Seven Network)
- 1 April – (United Kingdom) Fawlty Towers (ABC)
- 8 April – (United States) Jabberjaw (Nine Network)
- 15 May – (United Kingdom) Simon in the Land of Chalk Drawings (ABC)
- 28 May – (United States) Code R (The 0-10 Network)
- 17 July – (Italy) Tofffsy (ABC)
- 20 July – (United Kingdom) Roobarb (ABC)
- 29 July – (United States) / (United Kingdom) The Muppet Show (Seven Network)
- 6 August – (United States) One Day at a Time (Seven Network)
- 15 August – (United States) Seventh Avenue (Seven Network)
- 18 September – (United States) Wheelie and the Chopper Bunch (ABC)
- 31 October – (United States) Mr. T and Tina (The 0-10 Network)
- 8 November – (United States) The Andros Targets (The 0-10 Network)
- 9 November – (United States) Hunter (Seven Network)
- 10 November – (United States) The Jeffersons (The 0-10 Network)
- 12 November – (United States) Eight is Enough (Seven Network)
- 18 November – (New Zealand) Hunter's Gold (Seven Network)
- 1 December – (United Kingdom) Oh No, It's Selwyn Froggitt! (ABC)
- 3 December – (United States) The Secret of Isis (Nine Network)
- 5 December – (United States) Gibbsville (Seven Network)
- 7 December – (United States) Ball Four (The 0-10 Network)
- 27 December – (United Kingdom) Last of the Summer Wine (ABC)

== Television shows ==
=== 1950s ===
- Mr. Squiggle and Friends (1959–1999).

=== 1960s ===
- Four Corners (1961–present).
- It's Academic (1968–1978).

=== 1970s ===
- Hey Hey It's Saturday (1971–1999, 2009– 2010).
- Young Talent Time (1971–1988).
- A Current Affair (1971–1978).
- Countdown (1974–1987).
- The Don Lane Show (1975–1983).
- This Is Your Life (1975–1980).
- Flashez (1976–1977).
- In the Wild (1976–1981).
- Bluey (1976–1977).
- The Naked Vicar Show (1977–1978).
- Glenview High (1977–1979).

== Ending this year ==
Date	Show	Channel	Debut
18 January	Homicide	Seven Network	20 October 1964
1 February	The Outsiders	ABC	9 November 1976
25 April	Bluey	Seven Network	2 August 1976
11 August	Number 96	The 0-10 Network	13 March 1972
11 October	The Box	The 0-10 Network	11 February 1974
5 December	Flashez	ABC	2 August 1976
23 December	Bellbird	ABC	28 August 1967
1977	The Ernie Sigley Show	Nine Network	1974
1977	The Celebrity Game	The 0-10 Network	1976

== See also ==
- 1977 in Australia
- List of Australian films of 1977
