= Give 'Em Heaps =

Australian children's television show (1978)

- Genre: Teen magazine, comedy, variety
- Presented by: Ross Ryan, Mike Meade, Leo Bradney-George
- Country of origin: Australia
- Original language: English
- No. of seasons: 1
- No. of episodes: 26

Production
- Running time: 30 minutes

Original release
- Network: ABC
- Release: 29 August 1978 – 1979

Give 'Em Heaps is a ABC magazine style television program for teenagers in Australia. Debuting on 29 August 1978, it was fronted by Ross Ryan, Mike Meade (from Flashez) and Leo Bradney-George. The Canberra Times TV Guide listed it as "A fast-paced comedy and variety magazine for kids around the 10-year-old bracket with puppets, songs. jokes, pop music, animation and extracts from new movies." The 30 minute series ran for 26 episodes.
