= 1978 in Australian television =

This article is a summary of 1978 in Australian television.

== Events ==
- 20 March – Channel 0 launches its one-hour news service Eyewitness News with Bruce Mansfield as host.
- August – The ABC televises the 1978 Commonwealth Games from Edmonton, Alberta, Canada. The opening and closing ceremonies are televised live, with event highlights each day.
- 12 September – The very first major mini-series produced for Australian commercial television with a budget of over a million dollars Against the Wind is screen on Seven Network. It is also the first major Australian TV production to be broadcast in the United States.
- September – The Federal Government gives the go-ahead for the launch of a multicultural television service, to be operated by the Special Broadcasting Service (SBS), with the expectation of the new channel operating in Sydney and Melbourne by 1980.
- October – Channel 0 makes a request to the Federal Government for permission to change its broadcast frequency to Network Ten.
- 7 November – The 0-10 Network televises the Melbourne Cup to a national audience for the first time. The telecast is regarded as one of the largest national sports telecasts mounted to date.
- 64% of Melbourne and 70% of Sydney households now own colour TV sets, giving Australia one of the fastest changeovers to colour in the world.
- Graham Kennedy wins a Logie award for presenting Blankety Blanks.

== Debuts ==
Program	Network	Debut date
Eyewitness News	Channel 0	20 March
Catspaw	ABC	8 June
The Truckies	ABC	31 July
Against the Wind	Seven Network	12 September
The Daryl and Ossie Show	The 0-10 Network	11 September
The Tea Ladies	The 0-10 Network	12 October
Cuckoo in the Nest	Seven Network	22 December
Alexander Bunyip's Billabong	ABC	1978
Good Morning Sydney	TEN-10	1978
Case for the Defence	TEN-10	1978
Wayzgoose	ABC	1978

=== New international programming ===
- 2 January/29 November – (Canada) The Whiteoaks of Jalna (2 January: The 0-10 Network – Melbourne, 29 November: The 0-10 Network – Sydney)
- 19 January/4 July – (United States) Quincy, M.E. (19 January: Seven Network – Melbourne, 4 July: Seven Network – Sydney)
- 4 February – (United States) Far Out Space Nuts (The 0-10 Network)
- 6 February – (United States) Man from Atlantis (Seven Network)
- 8 February – (United Kingdom) The Fall and Rise of Reginald Perrin (ABC TV)
- 7 February – (United Kingdom) Robin's Nest (ABC TV)
- 8 February/21 February – (United States) The Love Boat (8 February: The 0-10 Network – TV movie, 21 February: Nine Network – TV series)
- 16 February – (United States) Kingston: Confidential (The 0-10 Network)
- 17 February – (United Kingdom) Open All Hours (ABC TV)
- 17 February – (United States) Big Hawaii (The 0-10 Network)
- 18 March – (United States) McDuff, the Talking Dog (Nine Network)
- 20 March – (United Kingdom) The Kids from 47A (ABC TV)
- 3 April – (United States) The New Adventures of Batman (The 0-10 Network)
- 3 April/7 November – (United Kingdom) Another Bouquet (3 April: Seven Network – Sydney, 7 November: Seven Network – Melbourne)
- 7 April – (United States) Soap (ABC TV)
- 10 April – (United States) Tarzan, Lord of the Jungle (The 0-10 Network)
- 1 May – (United Kingdom) Children of the Stones (ABC TV)
- 8 May – (United States) The Blue Knight (The 0-10 Network)
- 9 May – (United Kingdom) Miss Jones and Son (ABC TV)
- 9 May – (United States) Clue Club (Nine Network)
- 13 May – (United States) Uncle Croc's Block (Nine Network)
- 13 May – (United States) James at 15 (Seven Network)
- 18 May – (United Kingdom) Noddy (ABC TV)
- 30 May – (United Kingdom) Mr. Men (ABC TV)
- 5 June – (United Kingdom) Mind Your Language (Seven Network)
- 19 June – (United States) Nashville 99 (Seven Network)
- 21 June/19 July – (United States) Yabba Dabba Doo! The Happy World of Hanna-Barbera (21 June: Nine Network – Sydney, 19 July: Nine Network – Melbourne)
- 22 June – (United Kingdom) Rocky O'Rourke (ABC TV)
- 26 June – (United Kingdom) Chorlton and the Wheelies (ABC TV)
- 28 June – (United Kingdom) The Flockton Flyer (ABC TV)
- 28 June – (United Kingdom) Sailor (ABC TV)
- 6 July – (United States) Fantasy Island (Nine Network)
- 19 August – (United States) Bugs and Daffy's Carnival of the Animals (The 0-10 Network)
- 20 August – (United States) The Life and Times of Grizzly Adams (TV series) (The 0-10 Network)
- 28 August – (United Kingdom) Jamie and the Magic Torch (ABC TV)
- 2 September – (United States) Space Academy (The 0-10 Network)
- 9 September – (United States) The Skatebirds (Nine Network)
- 9 September – (United States) The Krofft Supershow (Nine Network)
- 11 September – (United States) The Red Hand Gang (The 0-10 Network)
- 13 October – (United States) Three's Company (ABC TV)
- 23 October – (United Kingdom) Who Pays the Ferryman? (ABC TV)
- 24 October – (United Kingdom) Armchair Thriller (ABC TV)
- 27 October – (United Kingdom) Flower Stories (ABC TV)
- 6 November – (United States) C.P.O. Sharkey (Nine Network)
- 7 November – (United States) Carter Country (Seven Network)
- 7 November – (United States) The Oregon Trail (Seven Network)
- 8 November – (United States) Rosetti and Ryan (Nine Network)
- 11 November – (United States) Future Cop (Nine Network)
- 30 November – (United States) Loves Me, Loves Me Not (Seven Network)
- 30 November – (United States) Sha Na Na (Seven Network)
- 7 December – (United Kingdom) Citizen Smith (ABC TV)
- 8 December – (United States) The McLean Stevenson Show (The 0-10 Network)
- 23 December – (United States) Good Heavens (Nine Network)
- (United States) CHiPS (Nine Network – Brisbane)
- (Japan) Kum-Kum (The 0-10 Network)
- (United States) Star Trek: The Animated Series (Nine Network)

== Television shows ==
=== 1950s ===
- Mr. Squiggle and Friends (1959–1999)

=== 1960s ===
- Four Corners (1961–present)

=== 1970s ===
- Hey Hey It's Saturday (1971–1999, 2009–2010)
- Young Talent Time (1971–1988)
- Countdown (1974–1987)
- The Don Lane Show (1975–1983)
- The Naked Vicar Show (1977–1978)

== Ending this year ==
Date	Show	Channel	Debut
3 March	Bobby Dazzler	Seven Network	20 November 1977
18 April	A Current Affair	Nine Network	22 November 1971
31 October	Against the Wind	Seven Network	12 September 1978
3 November	Blankety Blanks	The 0-10 Network	24 January 1977
1 December	This Day Tonight	ABC TV	1967
3 November 1978	The Daryl and Ossie Show	The 0-10 Network	11 September 1978
1978	It's Academic	Seven Network	1970
1978	The Naked Vicar Show	Seven Network	1977
1978	The Daryl and Ossie Cartoon Show	Nine Network	1977
1978	Pot of Gold	The 0-10 Network	1975

== Returning this year ==
- No shows returning this year.

== See also ==
- 1978 in Australia
- List of Australian films of 1978
