= Mike Meade (TV presenter) =

Australian television host

Mike Meade was an Australian TV presenter who appeared on Flashez, Give 'Em Heaps, ARVO and other Alexander Bunyip formats, and Now You See It.

Meade was born in Perth, circa 1951, where, after finishing school, he started working for Channel Nine as a cameraman. He moved up to floor manager and then made his screen debut working Claude, a dragon puppet. He relocated to Sydney, still as a floor manager for Nine. Meade as Claude appeared on ABC radio and then back onto TV on ABC's Target in the mid 70s. After helping out with auditions for a new show he became co-host of Flashez. He would continue on through other shows until hosting Now You See It in the 80s. Over this time he also wrote for the TV shows Give 'Em Heaps and Watch This Space, was in the bunyip suit as Alexander Bunyip and acted in Blinky Bill, Earthwatch and Mr Squiggle.
