= Liam Renton =

Australian radio presenter (born 1976)

- Born: Liam Bradley Renton; 22 July 1976 (age 50); Mundubbera, Queensland, Australia
- Presenting career
- Style: Host
- Country: Australia
- Website: directory.libsyn.com/shows/view/id/chrstmaspodding

Liam Bradley Renton is an Australian Radio, TV and Podcast personality. He currently is a presenter on 97.3 FM in Brisbane. Previously he was a newsreader on the kids TV show the Big Breakfast in the 1990s and formerly hosted the breakfast show on 96Five in Brisbane for over a decade. Liam also hosted the weekly countdown show "Australia's Hot 25 Countdown" heard on more than 500 Christian Stations throughout Australia.

== Early life ==
Renton was born in Mundubbera, Queensland and had a life saving operation at three weeks of age when he was unable to digest food. His father was a police officer for over 40 years and his mother ran a doctor's surgery. He attended Palmwoods State School from 1982 to 1988, and was house captain. He then went to the private school Immanuel Lutheran College from 89 to 93 and was a Prefect of the school. Renton was a member of the scouts and sang in numerous show choirs in his youth. He studied both business and journalism at SCIT and QUT in Brisbane.

== Career ==
=== Radio ===
Renton first started in radio on Rhema FM Sunshine Coast as one of their inaugural announcers. He then joined Sun FM and was paired up with radio legend Graham Webb as his on-air sidekick playing the Hits of the 1940s and 1950s. Renton then joined B105 as a Black thunder Pilot, until becoming a part of the "Jamie Dunn and the B105 Morning Crew" as their traffic reporter before moving on-air as an announcer. From there he was asked to join 96five in Brisbane as their first ever full-time night announcer. Star FM was then his on-air home for many years as the breakfast host in Griffith, Dubbo and Albury. Renton returned to 96five to anchor their breakfast show for a decade. . Liam was then poached by a rival radio station to head up the 97.3 FM Breakfast Show as Executive Producer taking the show to Number 1 in Brisbane. He is now heard as part of the on air line up on KIIS 97.3 FM

=== TV ===
Renton started his TV career as a reporter on Jam TV, an early morning kids show that played on Channel 7 Sunday mornings. He did stories on how to make a guitar, cricket bat and dance like a superstar. Renton joined the big time when selected to be a part of the kids TV show The Big Breakfast as the show's only newsreader. The show was edgy in its slot playing film clips, skating and surfing clips and cartoons. It bombed in the ratings and was eventually beaten by The Teletubbies. Renton then took the role as Tinky Winky, a role which he is still proud of today. He has also hosted the local community affairs show 360 on Bris 31 Digital for three years.

=== Podcasting ===
Renton hosts a popular Christmas Podcast called Christmas Podding. It is the only Christmas Podcast in Australia and was recently voted the 3rd Best Christmas Podcast on the Planet. The show runs all year and tackles the light hearted side of Christmas with topics, dilemmas, tips and tricks to help people enjoy Christmas without the hassle.

=== Author ===
Renton wrote and published his first book called "First Time Father" after the birth of his second child. A book filled with advice on what Dad's can expect when expecting for the first time. The book was a collection of stories, mistakes and issues he faced himself as a father for the first time, often using his own failings as content for his radio shows.

== See also ==
- 96Five
