= Quest (Australian TV series) =

Australian talent quest television show (1976–1978)

Quest is an ABC talent quest television program. Beginning in 1976 as Quest '76 it had 80 contestants competing in multiple performance categories over 8 heats and then into two finals. The show was hosted by Peter Regan and judges for the season were Ian Meldrum, Joe Latona, Brian May, Peter Rorke, Bryan Ashbridge and Dame Joan Hammond. Quest returned the next two years as Quest '77 and Quest '78.
