= Disappearance of Eloise Worledge =

Unsolved child abduction

Eloise Worledge
- Eloise Worledge, c. 1975
- Born: Eloise Anne Worledge; 8 October 1967
- Disappeared: 12 January 1976 (aged 8); Beaumaris, Victoria, Australia
- Status: Missing for 50 years, 9 months and 25 days
- Known for: Kidnapping victim and presumed murder victim
- Height: 4 ft 7 in (140 cm)
- Parents: Lindsay Worledge (father); Patsy Worledge (mother)

Eloise Anne Worledge (8 October 1967 – disappeared 12 January 1976) was an 8-year-old girl who was abducted from her home in Beaumaris, Victoria, Australia, on 12 January 1976. No one has ever been arrested in her abduction, which is now considered a cold case.

== Disappearance ==
Worledge's four-year-old brother raised the alarm when he noticed his sister was not in her room at 7:30 a.m. There was no sign of a struggle. He later told police that he had heard "robbers" who had kidnapped her – but was too scared to say anything because he thought they would take him too. He described hearing crackling noises that police believe to be consistent with steps on the sea-grass floor covering of Worledge's bedroom.

== Investigation and aftermath ==
Police believed that Worledge was lured from her bed by someone whom she knew and trusted, and had simply left the house via the front door, which had been left unlocked. Another possibility was that she may have been abducted by a prowler known to be in the area at the time.

A dark green car speeding down Scott Street at 2 a.m. was reported by a neighbour. Another neighbour reported seeing a green Holden station wagon she did not recognise parked near the Worledges' house. Around midnight, Ann Same, another neighbour, reported having seen a young man walking down the fenceline of the Worledge home, making her feel so uneasy that she crossed the street to avoid him. Around the same time, Molly Salts, a neighbour from further down the street, saw a young man jump the fence into the Worledge property after running in front of her car and across the street. At 2 a.m., Daphne Owen-Smith heard a child's cry and a car door slam; Ann Same reported also hearing this at the same time.

Bark from a tree outside Worledge's window was found on her bedroom floor. A small hole had been cut in the flyscreen of her window, but forensic tests revealed that it had been cut from the inside. Police believed the hole was too small to have been used by the abductor, and scientific evidence found it unlikely that Worledge was taken through her open bedroom window.

Both parents were initially treated as suspects. At the time of Worledge's disappearance both her parents had been having affairs and her father was believed to be depressed due to the looming divorce. He was to move out on the day Worledge had gone missing. Senior constable Nazaretian said in 2002 that Patsy Worledge told police at the time of her daughter's disappearance she felt that her husband "was involved in the disappearance as a means of prolonging the inevitable and as a way of spiting her".

On the night of Eloise's disappearance, her father had gone to bed over an hour and a half after her, and around an hour after his wife. He left the front door open because he was unaware Patsy had forgotten to close it. A passage light was left on in the hallway when the children went to bed each night, and was turned off by the last parent to bed, but it was stated by police that on that night "Lindsay Worledge did not turn off the passageway light". At around 4:45 a.m. the next morning, Patsy awoke to go to the toilet and noted that the light was off. It is almost certain Eloise had already been taken by this time.

Despite a very extensive search and a $10,000 reward (equivalent to $70,429 in 2022) posted in 1976, no trace of Worledge has ever been found. Homicide cold case detectives reinvestigated the case in 2001, but to no avail. Lindsay Worledge died in 2017. Patsy Worledge died in 2022.

In October 2023, Melbourne crime journalist John Silvester noted that Eloise's school, Beaumaris Primary School, became the subject of an inquiry into the activities of five paedophiles, former teachers. In the 1960s and 1970s, between fifty and one hundred children were allegedly molested, a fact unknown to police investigating the abduction of Eloise at the time.

== See also ==
- List of kidnappings
- List of people who disappeared
