= 1976 Fiji rugby union tour of Australia =

Summary
P	W	D	L
Total
13	5	0	8
Test match
3	0	0	3
Opponent
P	W	D	L
Australia
3	0	0	3

The 1976 Fiji rugby union tour of Australia was a series of matches played between May and June 1976 by the Fiji national rugby union team in Australia.

Three tests were played, all won by the Wallabies.

== Results ==
Scores and results list Fiji's points tally first.

Opposing Team	For	Against	Date	Venue	Status
Sydney	4	12	15 May 1976	Moore Park, Sydney	Tour match
Tasmania	48	8	19 May 1976	Oval, Queensborough	Tour match
Western Australia	47	3	22 May 1976	Perry Lakes, Perth	Tour match
South Australia	7	10	26 May 1976	Norwood Oval,	Tour match
Victoria	27	4	29 May 1976	Olympic Park, Melbourne	Tour match
New South Wales Country	11	13	1 June 1976	Wagga Wagga	Tour match
New South Wales	6	37	5 June 1976	Moore Park, Sydney	Tour match
A.C.T.	28	12	8 June 1976	Manuka Oval, Canberra	Tour match
Australia	6	22	12 June 1976	Cricket Ground, Sydney	Test match
Queensland	16	28	14 June 1976		Tour match
Australia	9	21	19 June 1976	Ballymore, Brisbane	Test match
Queensland Country	24	4	22 June 1976	Dalby	Tour match
Australia	17	27	26 June 1976	Cricket Ground, Sydney	Test match

== Matches ==
All times are local

15 May 1976
15:00

Sydney	12–4	Fiji

Sydney Sports Ground, Moore Park
Attendance: 12,200
Referee: Warwick Munro Cooney (Sydney)

22 May 1976

Western Australia	3–47	Fiji

Perry Lakes Stadium, Perth
Attendance: 7,000

29 May 1976

Victoria	4–27	Fiji

Olympic Park, Melbourne

8 Jun 1976

A.C.T.	12–28	Fiji

Manuka Oval, Manuka

12 Jun 1976

Australia	22–6	Fiji

Sydney Cricket Ground, Moore Park
Attendance: 14,299

14 Jun 1976

Queensland	16–28	Fiji

Ballymore Oval, Ballymore
Attendance: nearly 10,000

19 Jun 1976

Australia	21–9	Fiji

Ballymore Oval, Ballymore
Attendance: 12,000

22 Jun 1976
15:30

Queensland Country	4–24	Fiji

Dalby Sports Ground, Dalby
Referee: Colin Waldron (Sydney)

26 Jun 1976

Australia	27–17	Fiji

Sydney Cricket Ground, Moore Park
Attendance: 7,800
Referee: Warwick Munro Cooney

== Squad ==
- Seremaia Tui Cavuilati
- Wame Gavidi
- Peceli Kina
- Meli Kurisaru
- Ravuama Latilevu
- Dan Lobendahn
- Isoa Makutu
- Eroni Matalau
- Ameniasi Naituyaga
- Senitiki Nasave
- Watisoni Nasalo
- Jope Naucabalavu
- Tevita Rabuli
- Atonio Racika
- Lario Raitilava
- Viliame Ratudradra
- Tevita Rauga
- Josefa Rauto
- Josatiki Sovau
- Ilisomi Taoba
- Ilisikeli Tasere
- Josaia Taqiri
- Ilaitia Tuisese
- Jolame Veidrayaki
- Samisoni Viriviri
- Paula Waisake

== Management ==
- Manager: Dr Mesake Biumaiwai
- Assistant Manager/Coach: Michael Light
