= Ernest Henry Woollacott =

Australian Methodist minister (1888–1977)

Ernest Henry Woollacott (20 November 1888 – 18 April 1977) was an Australian Methodist minister, social welfare analyst and temperance advocate. Woollacott was born in Burra, South Australia and died in Marion, Adelaide, South Australia.
