= Alfred Jacobs =

Australian activist (1897–1976)

- Born: 11 July 1897
- Died: 26 January 1976 (aged 78)
- Occupations: Medical practitioner and campaigner for civil liberties and Aboriginal rights

Alfred Nailer Jacobs MM (11 July 1897 – 26 January 1976) was an Australian medical practitioner and campaigner for civil liberties and Aboriginal rights.

Jacobs was born at Surrey Hills in Melbourne to English-born warehouseman Henry Atwood Jacobs and Amy Lilian, née Scales. He attended Scotch College and the University of Melbourne but suspended his education during World War I to enlist in the Australian Imperial Force (5 January 1916), serving on the Western Front in the 15th Field Ambulance. He won the Military Medal for his actions on 29–30 September 1918 at Bellicourt, where he evacuated the wounded under heavy fire for thirty-six hours continuously. He completed his degree after the war, qualifying with a Bachelor of Medicine and a Bachelor of Surgery. He moved to Western Australia and took up a position on the staff of Fremantle Hospital.

On 6 January 1929 Jacobs married nurse Eva Ivy May Hurst in the chapel at Perth College. He worked at Harvey during the Depression and joined the Douglas Credit Party, of which he was vice-president in 1933. He ran unsuccessfully for the Senate in 1934 (for Social Credit) and for the Western Australian Legislative Council in 1944 (for Labor) and 1968 (as an independent). He jointly founded the Western Australian branch of the Australian Council for Civil Liberties and the rise of fascist ideologies drove him towards the left of the political spectrum; he was under surveillance from the Australian Security Intelligence Organisation.

Jacobs and his family moved to Narrogin in 1940, where he became involved in Aboriginal welfare. He was one of the founders of the Narrogin Native Welfare Committee in 1946, which campaigned for full citizenship rights and better opportunities for indigenous people. During this period Jacobs began to suffer from tuberculosis, and he was hospitalised in 1947, 1950, 1952 and 1955. He fought vigorously against Robert Menzies' attempt to ban the Communist Party, but denied involvement in the party itself; he occupied himself as a civil liberties and Aboriginal rights campaigner.

Jacobs died at Narrogin in 1976.
