= 1976–77 Sheffield Shield season =

Australian cricket tournament

- Cricket format: First-class
- Tournament format: Double round-robin
- Champions: Western Australia (6th title)
- Participants: 5
- Matches: 20
- Player of the series: Richie Robinson (Victoria)
- Most runs: David Hookes (South Australia) (788)
- Most wickets: Mick Malone (Western Australia) (40)

The 1976–77 Sheffield Shield season was the 75th season of the Sheffield Shield, the domestic first-class cricket competition of Australia. Western Australia won the championship.

== Table ==
Team	Played	Won	Tied	Drawn	Lost	Batting points	Bowling points	Win points	Total Points
Western Australia	8	6	0	2	0	39	39	60	138
South Australia	8	3	0	1	4	31	30	30	91
New South Wales	8	3	1	1	3	21	27	35	83
Victoria	8	3	0	3	2	19	33	30	82
Queensland	8	0	1	1	6	28	29	5	62

== Statistics ==
=== Most Runs ===
David Hookes 788

=== Most Wickets ===
Mick Malone 40
