= Alice Berry =

Australian activist (1900–1978)

Dame Alice Berry DBE
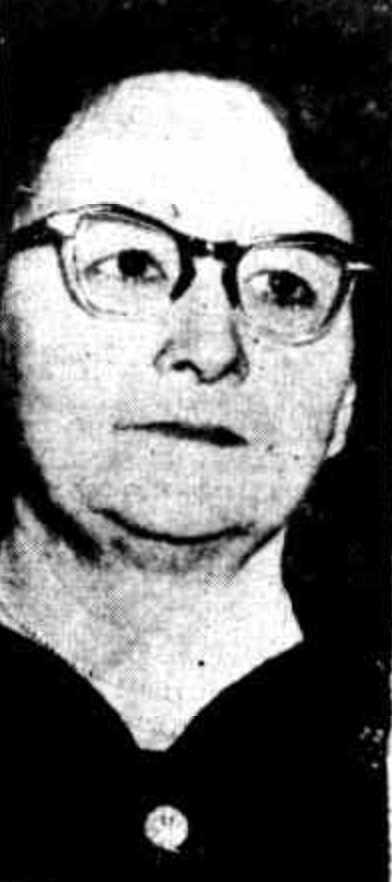
- Berry, c.1953
- Born: April 28, 1900; Sydney, Australia
- Died: September 18, 1978 (aged 78); Brisbane, Australia
- Other names: née McKenzie
- Occupation: Activist
- Spouse: Henry Berry (m. 1921)
- Children: 2

Dame Alice Miriam Berry DBE (née McKenzie; 28 April 1900, Sydney – 18 September 1978, Brisbane) was an Australian activist dedicated to finding ways to improve the lives of women and children in rural areas.

Born 28 April 1900 in Sydney, the eldest daughter of Charles Roy McKenzie, a native-born mining engineer, and his wife Matilda, née Abram, from New Zealand, she made a lasting contribution to the provision of services in country areas through her work in the Country Women's Association (CWA) in Queensland, and in the Associated Country Women of the World (ACWW).

Alice Berry worked tirelessly for projects dear to countrywomen, namely education, mothers' hostels, the aerial medical service and access to seaside cottages. Involved in other organizations, during World War II she worked for the Red Cross Society and the Australian Comforts Fund; she was also a commissioner of the Girl Guides' Association.

Survived by her daughters, Dame Alice died on 18 September 1978 at Royal Brisbane Hospital.

== Family ==
On 11 June 1921 she married Henry Berry, a woolclasser, grazier and merchant, at St Stephen's Presbyterian Church, Sydney. He had enlisted in the Australian Imperial Force in March 1916 and served in the 1st Light Horse Regiment in the Middle East. The couple had two daughters.

== Honours ==
In 1948 Berry was appointed State International Officer of the C.W.A. She served as Deputy-president (1951–52) of the State C.W.A. and president in 1953. Having led the Queensland delegation to the conference of the Associated Country Women of the World in Copenhagen in 1950, she did so again, to Toronto, Canada. There, in 1953, she was the first Australian to be elected president of the A.C.W.W. Re-elected unopposed in 1956, she served its six million members in twenty-seven countries for a further three years. During her term of office she twice toured the world to visit member nations. She returned to Queensland and was president (1961, 1962) of its C.W.A.

Berry was promoted from Officer (OBE) of the Order of the British Empire to Dame Commander (DBE) of the order on 1 January 1960 for "services to country women".

In 1962 she was elected national president of the CWA, and retired the next year. She worked on the State association's archives for ten years. In 1971 she was made a member of honour of the ACWW.
