= Gascoigne Leather Furniture =

Furniture manufacturer

- Trade name: Gascoigne Leather Centre
- Type: Private
- Industry: Furniture manufacturing
- Founded: Willetton, Western Australia (1976; 50 years ago)
- Founder: Kim Gascoigne
- Headquarters: 89-91 President Street, Kewdale, Western Australia, Australia
- Number of locations: 4
- Area served: Global
- Products: leather furniture
- Website: www.gascoigne.com.au

Gascoigne Leather Furniture was founded in Perth, Western Australia by Kim Gascoigne and Helen Gascoigne in 1976. Originally with 130 employees, Gascoigne Leather Furniture began operating out of a small factory in Willetton before relocating to a larger factory in Midvale several years later. In February 1999 the Midvale factory suffered $1.5 million worth of damage following an extensive fire started accidentally by two teenage employees.

In 2000, the company made the decision to begin manufacturing in Malaysia, with a factory controlled by Michael Gascoigne. The Malaysian factory is currently the company's primary manufacturer, with over 50% of Gascoigne Leather Furniture's products being manufactured by the Gascoigne Group. The company has also opened the first of five retail stores, Gascoigne Leather Centre in Osborne Park, Western Australia.

== Notable clients ==
Gascoigne Leather Furniture currently have over 260 retail clients across Australia, United Kingdom, Dubai, Singapore and France. They have supplied over 120,000 individual clients in Western Australia.

Amongst Gascoigne Leather Furniture's notable clients are Lady Diana and Prince Charles (for whom the company supplied a bespoke Chesterfield in 1981), John Howard during his 1996-2007 Prime Ministership, for whom the company supplied furniture for Kirribilli House, (one of two official residences of the Australian Prime Minister in Sydney, New South Wales). The company has also supplied custom made Chesterfield's for several Sultans and Prime Ministers in the Asian region.
