= Flashez =

Australian music television show (1976–1977)

Flashez is an ABC music television program hosted by Ray Burgess later being joined by co-host Mike Meade. The series began in August 1976 and ended on December 2 1977. It ran five days a week in an afternoon slot.
