= Denise Roberts =

Australian actress and director

- Education: Ensemble Theatre (2005); Australian Film, Television and Radio School (1998); Metro Screen (2003)
- Occupations: Actress, director, teacher
- Years active: 1980–present
- Known for: G.P. Packed to the Rafters

Denise Roberts, is an Australian actress, director, and founder of film and television acting school Screenwise in Sydney. She is known for her roles on TV in 1980s/90s medical drama G.P. and 2009 series Packed to the Rafters.

== Early life and education ==
Roberts became passionate about screen acting as a young child, but as screen acting schools did not exist at the time, she attended theatre school instead. Her mentor was Hayes Gordon, with whom she studied under for three years at Sydney's Ensemble Theatre, graduating in 2005.

In her later career, Roberts studied script editing (1996) and producing (1998) at Australian Film, Television and Radio School (AFTRS), followed by directing (2003) at Metro Screen.

== Career ==
Roberts has worked in theatre, film and television since 1980. She came to fame playing Julie Winters in the ABC TV medical drama G.P. for seven years, from 1989 to 1996. Her portrayal earned her nominations at the Logie Awards, the People's Choice Awards and the AACTA Awards, including an AACTA win for Best Lead Actress in a Television Drama. During her tenure on G.P., she also taught film and television for Hayes Gordon, at his Ensemble Studios.

Roberts was the creator and Associate Producer of the ABC's 1995 drama miniseries, Correlli, which gave Hugh Jackman his big Australian break. She also featured in two episodes.

In 1998, Roberts starred in Road to Nhill, which saw her nominated for a Film Critics Circle of Australia Best Supporting Actress award. The same year, the 10-minute, 16mm short thriller Stairwell (1998), which Roberts directed, was screened at the LA International Short Film Festival.

From 2001 to 2003, Roberts played town matriarch Isabelle Turnbull in Always Greener and had a starring role as university registrar Jessica Andrews in Roberts 7's HeadLand from 2005 to 2006. She played the role of Helen Jones in 2007 television film Joanne Lees: Murder in the Outback, a retelling of the real-life Peter Falconio case. That same year, she starred as Aunty Barbara in mockumentary feature film Razzle Dazzle: A Journey into Dance.

From 2009, Roberts played the recurring guest role of Bonnie Bright, the Scottish psychic sandwich lady in Channel 7's Packed to the Rafters, and again in 2012. She also played Faye in the feature film Subdivision, which premiered in August 2009. The following year, she played the regular role of Inspector Diane Pappas in the Nine Network police drama Cops L.A.C..

In 2013, Roberts featured in psychological thriller Nerve, alongside Gary Sweet, who played her character's husband. In 2014, she starred in television film Schapelle, playing Schapelle's mother Rosleigh Rose Corby, which saw her nominated for an AACTA Award for Best Supporting Actress, as well and a Silver Logie for Most Outstanding Actress in a Television Drama.

Further accolades followed with Best Supporting Actress nominations for Roberts' roles in 2015 film Nerve at the International World Film Festival, and 2016 thriller Concealed at the Sydney Indie Film Festival.

From 2020 to 2022, Roberts played the ongoing role of Bev Boyce in web series Grey Nomads.

Roberts' television guest credits are numerous, and have included A Country Practice, Sons and Daughters, Home and Away, Rafferty's Rules, E Street, Correlli, Snowy River: The McGregor Saga, Wildside, Pizza, All Saints, Underbelly: Razor, The Moodys, Wonderland, Five Bedrooms and God's Favorite Idiot – the latter opposite American actress Melissa McCarthy. Her other film credits include Going Sane (1987), The Dish (2000) and Opal Dream (2006).

Roberts' theatre performances include starring roles in the one-woman theatre shows Late Nite Catechism and Shirley Valentine. Further stage credits include The Vagina Monologues and Lovers at Versailles, the latter of which earned her a Chief Glugs Award at the 2004 Glugs Theatrical Awards Excellence Behind the Scenes. She also starred in Charitable Intent, which earned her a Sydney Theatre Critics Award nomination in 2006.

Roberts has also directed numerous theatre productions, including Lovers at Versailles at the Playhouse (Sydney Opera House) as well as Fully Committed, Educating Rita and The Oldest Profession all for Ensemble Theatre.

== Teaching ==
Roberts is the founder and principal director of Screenwise, a Sydney-based film and television school for actors, established in 2000.

Tutors at the school have included industry names such as Nicholas Hope, Terry Serio, Katherine Hicks, Gary Sweet, Susie Porter, Rachael Blake, Roxane Wilson, Jeremy Lindsay Taylor, Claire van der Boom, Felix Williamson, Maya Stange, Philip Quast, Peter Mochrie, Martin Dingle-Wall, Teo Gebert, Rhondda Findleton, Felicity Price, Alexandra Davies and director/producer Peter Andrikidis.

Successful actors who were former students include Chris Hemsworth, Isabel Lucas, Todd Lasance, Samantha Noble, Andy Whitfield and Tabrett Bethell.

== Awards ==
Year	Title	Award	Category	Result	Ref.
1991	G.P.	Logie Awards	Silver Logie for Most Outstanding Actress on Australian Television	Nominated	
1993	G.P.	People's Choice Awards	Most Popular Actress in a Television Drama series	Nominated	
1993	G.P. (episode: "Alone")	Australian Film Institute Awards	Best Performance by an Actress in a Leading Role in a Television Drama	Won	
1994	G.P.	Variety Club Television Drama Awards	Best Actress in a Television Drama	Won	
1994	G.P.	People's Choice Awards	Most Popular Actress in a Television Drama Series	Nominated	
1994	G.P.	Logie Awards	Silver Logie for Most Outstanding Actress on Australian Television	Nominated	
1998	Road to Nhill	Film Critics Circle of Australia	Best Supporting Actress	Nominated	
2004	Lovers at Versailles	Chief Glugs Award	Excellence Behind the Scenes	Won	
2006	Charitable Intent	Sydney Theatre Critics Awards	Best Actress in a Lead Role	Nominated	
2015	Nerve	International World Film Festival	Best Supporting Actress	Nominated	
2015	Schapelle	AACTA Awards	Best Guest or Supporting Actress in a Television Drama	Nominated	
2015	Schapelle	Logie Awards	Silver Logie for Most Outstanding Actress in a Television Drama	Nominated	
2016	Concealed	Sydney Indie Film Festival	Best Supporting Actress	Nominated	

== Film ==
=== As actor ===
Year	Title	Role	Notes
1985	The Boy Who Had Everything	Rita	Feature film
1986	For Love Alone	Mrs. Ashley	Feature film
1987	Going Sane	Mrs. Chubb	Feature film
1997	Road to Nhill	Gwen	Feature film
2000	The Dish	Bronwyn	Feature film
2003	Kangaroo Jack	Tansy	Feature film
2006	Opal Dream	Vera Dunkley	Feature film
2006	One Last Shot	Waitress	Short film
2007	Razzle Dazzle: A Journey into Dance	Barbara	Feature film (mockumentary)
2007	Boys Own Story	Aunt Eileen	Short film
2009	Subdivision	Faye	Feature film
2009	Benefit	Mother	Short film
2010	Dying Ice	Elder	Short film
2010	Anyone You Want	Jenny	
2012	Leech	Betty	Short film
2013	Nerve	Sally Livingston	Feature film
2014	The Half Dead	The See-er	Post-production
2015	Spirit of the Game	Sister Bingham	Feature film
2017	Concealed	Irene	Feature film
TBA	Shadow Wars	The See-er	Post-production
TBA	Juvenescence	Headmistress Audrey Hammersmith	Post-production

=== As producer / director / writer ===
Year	Title	Role	Notes	Ref.
1998	Stairwell	Director / Producer	Short film	
2005	So Darn Hot!	Producer	Short film	
2006	Well Baked	Producer	Short film	
2008	Under a Red Moon	Associate Producer	Feature film	
2009	The Mad Chase	Producer	Short film	
2010	The Rose	Producer	Short film	
2012	Contamination	Director	Short film	
2013	Good Neighbours	Director	Short film	
2015	After Party	Executive Producer	Short film	
2016	Shadowbox	Producer	Short film	
2016	Our Father	Producer	Short film	
2016	No Good Deed	Producer	Short film	
2016	In the Stars	Producer	Short film	
2016	Anything for Family	Producer	Short film	
2016	An Honest Way	Producer	Short film	
2016	A Gathering	Producer	Short film	
2025	Love Shack	Producer	Short film	
2025	Pet World: Team Building	Producer	Short film	
2025	Echo	Writer / Director/ Producer	Short film	

== Television ==
=== As actor ===
Year	Title	Role	Notes
1981	Bellamy	Bev	Episode: "Bet Your Life"
1984	A Halo for Athuan	Maizy	TV film
1985	A Country Practice	Patient / Kristine Cox	3 episodes: "Walk Tall: Parts 1 & 2", "Work Experience: Part 2"
1986	Hector's Bunyip	Gladys Glum	TV film
1986–1987	Sons and Daughters	Kidnapper	Episode: "1.799"
1986–1987	Sons and Daughters	Monica	Episode: "1.972"
1987	Two Friends	Jessie	TV film
1987	Rafferty's Rules	Mrs. Bridges	Episode: "Kids"
1988; 1989	Home and Away	Woman Customer	Season 1, episode 51
1988; 1989	Home and Away	Nola Dibble	Season 2, episode 258
1989	Fields of Fire III	Mrs. Anderson	Miniseries
1989; 1990	E Street	Myra	Season 1, episode 2-3
1989; 1990	E Street	Myra	Episode: "The Reverend & the Doctor?"
1989–1996	G.P.	Julie Winters	317 episodes
1992	Sinbad the Sailor	Voice	Animated TV film
1995	Correlli	Helen Buckley	2 episodes: "Solitary", "Lock-Down"
1996	The Man from Snowy River (aka Snowy River: The McGregor Saga)	Mary Kelly	Episode: "The Grand Opening"
1998; 2005	All Saints	Janice McGregor	Episode: "A Little Magic"
1998; 2005	All Saints	Margaret	Episode: "Funny Games"
1999	Wildside	Sheryl Cunningham	Episode: "2.19"
2000; 2003	Grass Roots	Evelyn Savage	Episode: "The Whole Year"
2000; 2003	Grass Roots	Christina	Episode: "Investigation"
2001	Water Rats	Meredith Dillon	Episode: "The Thin Edge"
2001	Pizza	Jackie / Mum Stanko	2 episodes: "Politically Incorrect Pizza", "Girlfriend Pizza"
2001; 2002	BackBerner	Beryl Todd	Episode: "3.4"
2001; 2002	BackBerner	Various	Episode: "1.134"
2001–2003	Always Greener	Isabelle Turnbull	50 episodes
2004	Home and Away	Valerie Squires	Season 17, 8 episodes
2005–2006	Headland	Jessica Andrews	26 episodes
2007	Joanne Lees: Murder in the Outback	Helen Jones	TV film
2009	East West 101	Janet Miller	Episode: "Men of Conscience"
2009; 2012	Packed to the Rafters	Bonnie Bright	3 episodes: "Having It All", "Look Into My Eyes", "Putting the House in Order"
2009; 2012	Packed to the Rafters	Bonnie Bright	Episode: "Sign of the Times"
2010	Cops L.A.C.	Detective Inspector Diane Pappas	13 episodes
2011	Underbelly: Razor	Alice Twiss	Miniseries, episode: "Jerusalem Revisited"
2011	Blood Brothers	Sue O'Farrell	TV film
2012	Mrs Biggs	Annie Pitcher	2 episodes: "1.3", "1.4"
2013	Cliffy	Molly	TV film
2013	Wonderland		Episode: "The Exes"
2014	Schapelle	Rosleigh Rose	TV film

=== As producer ===
Year	Title	Role	Notes	Ref.
1994	Correlli	Concept Creator / Associate Producer	Miniseries	

== Theatre ==
=== As actor ===
Year	Title	Role	Notes	Ref.
1983	The Bear	Mrs Popov	Ensemble Theatre, Sydney	
1984	A Kind of Alaska	Deborah	Ensemble Theatre, Sydney	
1985	When in Rome	Margaret	Ensemble Theatre, Sydney	
1986	The Shadow Box	Maggie	Ensemble Theatre, Sydney	
1987	Once a Catholic	Mother Thomas Aquinas	Ensemble Theatre, Sydney	
1988	Talk of the Devil	Mrs Maguire	Ensemble Theatre, Sydney	
1990	A Night with Robinson Crusoe	Julie	Ensemble Studios, Sydney for Festival of Sydney	
1992	The Slab Boys	Sadie	Crossroads Theatre, Sydney with O'Punksky's Theatre Company for Festival of Sydney	
1992	Man of the Moment	Sharon	York Theatre, Sydney with Ensemble Theatre	
1993	The Seahorse	Gertrude	Ensemble Studios, Sydney with Sydney Festival	
1994	The Rise and Fall of Little Voice	Sadie	Adelaide Festival with STC	
1999–2000	Shirley Valentine	Shirley Valentine	Ensemble Theatre, Sydney, Bridge Theatre, Sydney with STC / Blue Sky Ent	
1999–2000	Late Nite Catechism	Sister	Bridge Theatre, Sydney, IMB Theatre, Wollongong, Courtyard Studio, Canberra, North Adelaide Community Centre with Adrian Bohm Presents	
2000	Girls' Night Out	Aunty Ivy	Star City Showroom, Sydney with Jacobsen Entertainment	
2001–2003	The Vagina Monologues	Various roles	Ensemble Studios, Sydney, Valhalla Cinema, Sydney, Acton Street Theatre, Canberra with Adrian Bohm Presents	
2005	Shirley Valentine	Shirley Valentine	Civic Theatre, Newcastle with Rock City Productions	
2006	Charitable Intent	Amanda	Ensemble Theatre, Sydney	

=== As director ===
Year	Title	Role	Notes	Ref.
1996	Veronica's Room	Director	Ensemble Theatre, Sydney	
1997	RIP Ripper	Director	Rat Bag Theatre Company, Sydney	
1997	Educating Rita	Director	Ensemble Theatre, Sydney	
1999	Beautiful Thing	Director	Ensemble Theatre, Sydney	
2000	Wit	Associate Director	Ensemble Theatre, Sydney	
2001	The Oldest Profession	Director	Ensemble Theatre, Sydney	
2002–2003	Fully Committed	Director	Ensemble Studios, Sydney, Chapel Off Chapel, Melbourne	
2004	Lovers at Versailles	Director	Sydney Opera House	
2005	Shirley Valentine	Director	Civic Theatre, Newcastle with Rock City Productions	
2007	The Getaway	Director	Newtown Theatre, Sydney with Screenwise for Short+Sweet	

== Radio ==
Year	Title	Role	Notes	Ref.
1982	Counter Talk		Documentary drama	
1985	That's Democracy		Documentary drama	
1987	Managing the Schools (Education Department)		Documentary drama	
1989	History of Australia	Narrator	ABC (Educational)	
1989	The Passing of Catherine	Mrs Boyle	ABC	

== Publications ==
Year	Title	Role	Publisher	Ref.
1995	Get Your Act Together: The Actor's Advisory Manual	Author	Federation Press	
