= Concealed (film) =

2017 film

- Directed by: Shane T. Hall
- Written by: Shane T. Hall
- Produced by: Jacqui Fifer; Lyall Sumner; Jo McNulty
- Starring: Simon Lyndon; Paul Tassone; Joanne Priest; Yalin Ozucelik; Nadia Townsend
- Cinematography: Oliver Lawrance
- Edited by: Eleanor Infante
- Music by: Simon Whiteside
- Release date: 2017
- Running time: 86 minutes
- Country: Australia
- Language: English

Concealed is a 2017 Australian thriller film written and directed by Shane T. Hall.

== Plot ==
Max returns home to Australia to find his girlfriend Sallie has gone missing. He and his childhood friend Richard search for Sallie.

== Cast ==
- Simon Lyndon as Max
- Paul Tassone as Richard
- Joanne Priest as Jacky
- Yalin Ozucelik as Perry
- Nadia Townsend as Sallie
- Anthony Phelan as Joe
- Denise Roberts as Irene

== Reception ==
Leslie Felperin of the Guardian gave it 2 stars, writing "Sadly, it’s more of a mud pie of contemporary thriller tropes that don’t hold together for long." The Times's Kevin Maher's 2 star review was subtitled "This foolhardy film never feels like anything other than kitschy ‘let’s pretend’" Anton Bitel wrote in RealCrime Magazine "Accordingly, as this hybrid film, all at once fish-out-of-water thriller and domestic tragedy, constantly switches between these two modes, it generates considerable ambiguity, even mystery from its own mismatched, dysfunctional plotting – with everything hidden in plain sight".
