= Mary Moody (disambiguation) =

Mary Moody is an Australian author.

Mary Moody may also refer to:

- Mary Blair Moody (1837–1919), American physician
- Mary Moody Northen (1892–1986), née Mary Moody, American financier and philanthropist

== See also ==
- Mary Moody Emerson (1774–1863), American letter writer and diarist
