= Happy Hunting =

Happy Hunting may refer to:

- Happy Hunting (musical), a 1956 musical
- Happy Hunting (film), a 2016 American western horror film

== See also ==
- Happy hunting ground, a concept of the afterlife associated with Native Americans in the United States
