= Natalie McCurry =

Australian actress

- Born: Natalie Tania McCurry; 7 July 1966
- Died: 27 September 2014 (aged 48)
- Occupation: Actress
- Years active: 1986–2004
- Notable work: Dead End Drive-In (1986); Chances (1991)
- Partner: Sean Panambalana
- Children: 4

Natalie McCurry (7 July 1966 – 27 September 2014) was an Australian actress and beauty queen who was crowned Miss Australia in 1989.

== Career ==
Natalie McCurry was an original main cast member on Australian television series Chances, playing Rebecca Taylor for 71 episodes. She left in 1991, as many cast members were leaving due to increasing demands to do nude scenes. She also had guest roles in several television series including Sons and Daughters, Hey Dad..!, Time Trax, Flipper, Twisted Tales, Home and Away and All Saints.

McCurry played a lead role of Carmen in the Australian dystopian Ozploitation film Dead End Drive-In in 1986. Other film credits include the comedy Going Sane (1987), horror films Cassandra (1987) and Kadaicha (1988), erotic thriller Glass (1989), black comedy Mushrooms (1995) and romantic comedy/drama Oyster Farmer (2004). She also appeared in the television films Danger Down Under (1988) and Official Denial (1993).

== Personal life ==
McCurry was married to husband Sean, with whom she had four children.

In 1990, McCurry was injured, breaking her collarbone, after one of the cords broke while doing a promotional tandem bungee jump at Birkenhead Point in Sydney. This resulted in a temporary ban of the sport in New South Wales.

== Death ==
McCurry died from cancer, on 27 September 2014. Her funeral was held in Osborne Park, Western Australia.

== Filmography ==
=== Film ===
Year	Title	Role	Type
1986	Cassandra	Sally	Feature film
1986	Dead End Drive-In	Carmen	Feature film
1987	Going Sane	Young Girl	Feature film
1988	Kadaicha	Tracy Hocking	Feature film
1989	Glass	Alison Baumer	Feature film
1994	Mushrooms	Maureen	Feature film
2004	Oyster Farmer	Pearl's Mum	Feature film

=== Television ===
Year	Title	Role	Type
1986	A Country Practice	Celia Arnold	2 episodes, including "Ghosts"
1986	Sons and Daughters	Cheryl Harvey	TV series, 2 episodes
1987	Danger Down Under (aka Harris Down Under)	Katherine Dillingham	TV film US/Australia
1989	Hey Dad...!	Solva Elvirani	TV series, 1 episode
1991	Chances	Rebecca Taylor (as Natalie McCurrie)	TV series, 71 episodes
1993	Time Trax	Sergeant Nicole Nolan	TV series US/Australia, 1 episode
1993	Official Denial	Janine	TV film US/Australia
1995	Flipper	Deidre Cilione	TV series US/Australia, 1 episode
1996	Flipper	Rene Sipes	TV series US/Australia, 1 episode
1996	Twisted Tales	Tania	TV series, 1 episode 4: "Bonus Mileage"
1997	Home and Away	Julia Robson	TV series, 3 episodes
2003	All Saints	Irene Netterfield	TV series, 1 episode
