= Golden Fiddles =

- Genre: mini-series
- Written by: Sheila Sibley
- Directed by: Claude Fournier
- Starring: Kate Nelligan; John Bach; Rachel Friend; Cameron Daddo; David Reyne; Mouche Phillips
- Composers: George Dreyfus; William Ross
- Countries of origin: Australia; Canada
- Original language: English
- No. of episodes: 2

Production
- Producer: Stanley Walsh
- Running time: 2 x 2 hours

Original release
- Network: Nine Network
- Release: 18 August – 19 August 1991

Golden Fiddles is a 1994 Australian mini series based on the novel by Mary Grant Bruce. It was shot from 23 July to 16 September 1991 and was re-edited into a TV movie in 1994.

== Cast ==
- Kate Nelligan as Anne Balfour
- John Bach as Walter Balfour
- Rachel Friend as Kitty Balfour
- Cameron Daddo as Norman Balfour
- David Reyne as Jack Greville
- Justine Clarke as Liddy Powell
- Pippa Grandison as Elsa Balfour
- Hamish Fletcher as Bob Balfour
- David Whitney as Adrian Treherne
- Charles Mayer as Philippe Allard
- Edmund Pegge as Mr. Craig
- Penne Hackforth-Jones as Mrs. Craig
- Mouche Phillips as Daphne Craig
- Gil Tucker as Sam Briggs
- Oriana Panozzo as Mrs. Briggs
- Gerda Nicolson as Miss. Birrell
- Edwin Hodgeman as Abenisi
- Bud Tingwell as Narrator
