= David Hannay (producer) =

New Zealand Australian film producer

- Born: 23 June 1939; Wellington, New Zealand
- Died: 31 March 2014 (aged 74); Yetholme, New South Wales, Australia
- Education: Scots College
- Occupations: Film and television producer
- Spouse: Mary Moody

David Hannay (23 June 1939 – 31 March 2014) was a New Zealand Australian film and television producer. He worked with Greater Union and was an independent producer from 1977.

== Biography ==
Hannay was born in Wellington, New Zealand to Norman Hannay, an Entertainment Officer for the New Zealand Expeditionary Force in Rome and his wife Mary and attended Scots College.

His first job in the industry was as an extras casting assistant for film Summer of the Seventeenth Doll.

Hannay produced his first feature film The Set in 1968 and then moved to television and became head of production for "Gemini Productions" from 1970–73 and 1975–76.

In 1974 he was general manager for The Movie Company, a production subsidiary of Greater Union. From 1977 he was an independent producer and was involved in almost 50 film projects including cult classics Stone (1974) and The Man From Hong Kong (1975), Human Rights Australia Film Award winner Mapantsula (1998), Naomi Watts' first feature film Gross Misconduct (1993) and family film Hildegarde (2001) which starred Richard E. Grant and Tom Long.

Hannay was passionate about encouraging new talent as an educator and mentor, and across his career worked with many writers, producers and directors on their first feature films. In November 2012 Hannay established the Bathurst Film Factory co-operative to foster the filmmaker talent in the area.

He was diagnosed with cancer in March 2012, and died in March 2014. An obituary described him as "one of the pioneers of the modern Australian film industry, a passionate cinephile, mentor and loyal friend."

== Personal life ==
Hannay was married to fellow New Zealander Kathleen Bourke and they had one son (Antony Darton Hannay) before separating. Hannay then met Australian journalist Mary Moody and they had three children together (Miriam, Aaron and Ethan).

Hannay's brother Charles Hannah entered the film industry in 1984 after a successful career as an international corporate executive and restaurateur. David, Charles and sister Gillian are the children of theatre actress and writer Mary Stuart (Hannah) and theatre and radio actor-producer-director Norman Hannah.

== Select credits ==
- The Set (1970)
- Kung Fu Killers (1974) – Co-producer
- Stone (1974)
- The Man from Hong Kong (1975)
- Solo (1977)
- Alison's Birthday (1981)
- Early Frost (1982)- producer and post-production director
- Emma's War (1986)
- Death of a Soldier (1986)
- Comrades (1986) – Associate Producer
- Out of the Body (1988)
- To Make a Killing (1988)
- Kadaicha (1988)
- Mapantsula (1988)
- The Returning (1990)
- Gross Misconduct (1993)
- Shotgun Wedding (1993)
- Dead Funny (1994) – Producer
- Savage Play (1995) – Producer
- Dags (1998) – Executive Producer
- Cubbyhouse (2001)
- Hildegarde (2001) – Producer
- A Divided Heart (2005) – Producer
- Mortal Fools (2008) – Executive Producer
- Ten Dead Men (2008) – Executive Producer
- The Argues (2010) – Producer
- Once Around the Sun (2012) – Executive Producer

== Awards ==
- 1998 – Human Rights Australia Film Award for Mapantsula
- 1996 – Producers and Directors Guild of Australia Lifetime Achievement Award
- 1996 – Named Film Pioneer of the Year by The Society of Australian Cinema Pioneers 'for outstanding service to the Motion Picture Industry'
- 2002 – Screen Producers Association Maura Fay Award 'for service to the industry'
- 2007 – AFI Raymond Longford Award 'for lifetime achievement'
- 2008 – Australian Screen Sound Guild's Syd Butterworth Lifetime Achievement Award
- 2009 – Life membership of Screen Producers Association of Australia 'for long and outstanding service to the industry of Australian Screen Production'
- 2011 – National Film and Sound Archive's Ken G Hall Film Preservation Award 'for outstanding contribution to the art of the moving image and its preservation'

== Interviews ==
- David Hannay Interview at SoundCloud
- An Interview with David Hannay (Part 1) at A Girl and a Gun
- An Interview with David Hannay (Part 2) at A Girl and a Gun
- Mapantsula: David Hannay
- David Hannay talks about creating films
- David Hannay talks about funding
- The Argues Movie – The David Hannay Interview with Barry Crocker
- 2007 AFI Raymond Longford Award Presentation
- 2011 Ken G Hall Film Preservation Award Presentation

== In Memoriam ==
- Vale David Hannay at in Film
- The Late Great David Hannay at Special Broadcasting Service (SBS) Movies
- The Huge Heart of Horrible Hannay at Michael Burge
- RIP David Hannay at FilmLink
- Vale David Hannay at National Film and Sound Archive
- David Hannay 1939 – 2014 at NZ filem Commission
- Vale David Hannay at Innersence
- The Passing of the Light at Freelance Success
- RIP Australian Genre Producer David Hannay at Geek Syndicate
- In Memoriam: David Hannay dies at home at Screen Arts Hub
- RIP Australian Producer David Hannay
- RIP David Hannay
