= Brett Climo =

Australian actor, comedian (b. 1964)

- Born: 26 September 1964 (age 62); Sydney, New South Wales, Australia
- Occupation: Actor
- Years active: 1982–present
- Known for: Sons and Daughters; A Country Practice; The Flying Doctors; Blue Heelers; All Saints; A Place to Call Home
- Spouse: Michelle Louis (m. 1996)

Brett Leonard Climo (born 26 September 1964) is an Australian film, television and stage actor. He is best known for playing Peter Healy in the soap opera Sons and Daughters and George Bligh in a A Place to Call Home.

== Early life ==
Climo was born on 26 September 1964 to parents Nancy and Ray in Sydney, Australia. His father died of a stroke when he was three years old, and he was raised by his mother and grew up with two older sisters, Annette and Deanne in Sydney. His mother married his stepfather, David, when Climo was 11 years old.

== Career ==
Climo's first regular role was as Peter Healy in soap opera Sons and Daughters in 1983. He had several film roles and made guest appearances in shows such as Five Mile Creek, before his big break came in 1987 with the role of Ritchie in miniseries Vietnam alongside Nicole Kidman, after having previously appeared with her in the TV movies Chase Through the Night and Archer.

From 1987 to 1989, a regular role in the soap opera A Country Practice followed, playing Michael Langley. He had previously played guest roles in the series. He left A Country Practice (filmed in New South Wales) to join the cast of The Flying Doctors in Melbourne because he "wanted to set up a new life". He played Dr. David Ratcliffe and remained on the series until 1991.

In 1991, Climo had a recurring guest role as Danny Tanner on medical drama G.P. From 1994 to 1996, he played the character of Colin Mcgregor in the outback period adventure drama The Man from Snowy River (known overseas as Snowy River: The Mcgregor Saga). From 1997 to 1998, he played the recurring role of Robbie Doyle in police procedural series Blue Heelers. Beginning in 1998, he also had a recurring role as Dr Malcolm Pussle in long-running medical drama All Saints, through to 2003.

In 2000, Climo played Ray Sandler in children's series Eugénie Sandler P.I.. From 2008 to 2009 he played the regular role of Omar in children's series The Elephant Princess. He starred as Detective Inspector Paul Sheridan in the 2011 Underbelly TV movie, Tell Them Lucifer Was Here. In 2012, he appeared in another TV movie, the period mystery drama The Mystery of a Hansom Cab.

In 2013, Climo was cast as George Bligh, the romantic lead alongside Marta Dusseldorp in the 1950s dynasty drama, A Place to Call Home. He played the role until 2018.

Most recently Climo has played the recurring role of Mick Riley on murder mystery series Darby and Joan, opposite Bryan Brown and Greta Scacchi.

His guest appearances are numerous, on series including Rafferty’s Rules, Snowy, Pacific Drive, Halifax f.p., Murder Call, Water Rats, Stingers, Something in the Air, City Homicide, Cops L.A.C. and Fisk.

== Personal life ==
Climo is married to hospitality-training manager Michelle Louis, whom he met when he was 20 years old and they were housemates. Together they have a son.

== Filmography ==
=== Film ===
Year	Title	Role	Notes
1985	A Street to Die	Trevor	
1985	Relatives	Ross	
1986	Dead End Drive-In	Don	
1987	Going Sane	Matthew Brown	
1993	Body Melt	Brian Rand	
1995	Blackwater Trail	Father Michael	
1996	The Inner Sanctuary	Andrew	
2006	Lost and Found	McKenzie Morgan	
2009	Blessed	Michael	

=== Television ===
Year	Title	Role	Notes
1982	A Country Practice	Barry Hall	Episode: "Prisoner of the Valley: Parts 1 & 2"
1983	Sons and Daughters	Peter Healy	Main role
1983	Chase Through the Night	Ray	TV film
1984	A Country Practice	Sandy Hughes	Episode: "Horse of a Different Colour: Parts 1 & 2"
1984	Five Mile Creek	Brennan	Episode: "The Hangman's Noose"
1984	High Country	Alex Corbett	TV film
1985	A Fortunate Life	Terry	Episode: "Providence (1914–1916)"
1985	Archer	Dave Power	TV film
1986	I Own the Racecourse	Constable Eadie	TV film
1987	Vietnam	Ritchie	TV miniseries
1987	The Wicked	Bronco	TV film
1987	The Flying Doctors	Trevor Neilson	Episode: "The Hometown Hero"
1987–1989	A Country Practice	Michael Langley	Main role
1989–1991	The Flying Doctors	Dr. David Ratcliffe	Main role
1991	Embassy	Joshua	Episode: "Cherchez La Femme"
1991	G.P.	Danny Turner	Recurring role
1993	Snowy	Gordon King	Episode: "Mick's Café"
1994	Tracks of Glory	Jonathan Dodds	TV miniseries
1994–1996	The Man from Snowy River	Colin McGregor	Main role
1996	Pacific Drive	Shane Ritchie	TV soap opera
1996	Halifax f.p.	Danny	Episode: "Without Consent"
1997	Murder Call	Kim Kouros	Episode: "Black Friday"
1997–1998	Blue Heelers	Robbie Doyle	Recurring role
1998	All Saints	Bryan Taylor	Episode: "Happy Death Day"
1998	The Silver Brumby	Thowra (voice)	Episode: "Getting Together"
1999	Water Rats	Terry Spiro	Episode: "Santiago Rain"
1999	Close Contact	Chris Price	TV film
2000	Stingers	Dr. Gresham	Recurring role
2000	Eugénie Sandler P.I.	Ray Sandler	Main role
2001	Something in the Air	Steve Saks	3 episodes: "A Day in the Life of Mother and Wife", "Love Your Work", "Bulldust and Cow Pats"
2001–2003	All Saints	Dr. Malcolm Pussle	Recurring role
2002	The Angel Files	Nathan	Episode: "Pilot Movie"
2005	Little Oberon	Dr. Vivian Cage	TV film
2006	Penicillin: The Magic Bullet	Norman Heatley	TV film
2008–2009	The Elephant Princess	Omar	Main role (season 1)
2009	City Homicide	Victor Carling	Episode: "Stolen Sweets"
2010	Cops L.A.C.	Dave	Episode: "Ghost House"
2011	Underbelly Files: Tell Them Lucifer was Here	Det. Inspector Paul Sheridan	TV film
2011	Killing Time	David Ross QC	Episode: "1.6"
2012	Australia on Trial	John Plunkett	Episode: "Massacre at Myall Creek"
2012	The Mystery of a Hansom Cab	Oliver Whyte	TV film
2013–2018	A Place to Call Home	George Bligh	Main role
2024	Fisk	Sergeant McCabe	1 episode
2024	Darby and Joan	Mick Riley	Season 2

== Theatre ==
Year	Title	Role	Notes
1991	Hay Fever	Simon Bliss	Playhouse, Melbourne with MTC
1999	Fred	Detective Rose	Fairfax Studio, Melbourne with MTC
2000	Crazy Brave	Jim Morgan	Malthouse Theatre with Playbox Theatre Company
2002	The Lady in the Van		Sydney Opera House with STC
2003–2004	The Ishmael Club	Will Dyson	Trades Hall, Melbourne, Malthouse Theatre with Playbox Theatre Company
