= Zoe Sheridan =

Australian television presenter

- Born: 1978 (age 47–48); Adelaide, South Australia, Australia
- Occupations: television presenter; radio announcer; voice over artist
- Television: Challenger
- Children: 2
- Relatives: Hugh Sheridan (sibling)

Zoe Sheridan (born in Adelaide, 1978) is an Australian television presenter, radio announcer and voice over artist.

Sheridan was a co-host of the Hot 30 Countdown on Brisbane radio from 1995 to 1998. She moved to Sydney in 1998 for a regular slot on 2Day FM.

Sheridan's first major on-screen television role was hosting five series of the children's game show Challenger in the 1990s. She moved onto the Saturday night variety show Russell Gilbert Live in 2000, where she played songs to and from ad breaks and spoke about featured musical guests on the show. She was also one of the four co-hosts on the daytime chat show The Catch-Up (loosely based on the American program The View).

Sheridan is a noted advert voice-over artist and is the voice of the pay television channel Arena. She has also appeared on ads for Zoot Review and co-hosted a VH1 music show with David Campbell called Inside Track.

Sheridan is the sister of actor Hugh Sheridan, from the comedy drama series Packed to the Rafters. She is also the mother of two daughters.

In October 2021, Sheridan returned to 2Day FM to host mornings.
