= Dead End Drive-In =

- Theatrical release poster
- Directed by: Brian Trenchard-Smith
- Screenplay by: Peter Smalley
- Based on: "Crabs" by Peter Carey (uncredited)
- Produced by: Andrew Williams
- Starring: Ned Manning; Natalie McCurry; Peter Whitford
- Cinematography: Paul Murphy
- Edited by: Alan Lake; Lee Smith
- Music by: Frank Strangio
- Production companies: Springvale Productions; New South Wales Film Corporation
- Distributed by: Greater Union Film Distributors (Australia); New World Pictures (International)
- Release date: 22 August 1986
- Running time: 92 minutes (Australia); 87 minutes (International)
- Country: Australia
- Language: English
- Budget: A$2.5 million
- Box office: $68,000 (Australia)

Dead End Drive-In is a 1986 Australian dystopian action film about a teenage couple trapped in a drive-in theatre which is really a concentration camp for societal rejects. The inmates, many of whom sport punk fashion, are placated with a steady diet of junk food, new wave music, drugs, and exploitation films. The film was directed by Brian Trenchard-Smith and stars Ned Manning and Natalie McCurry as the captive couple, and Peter Whitford as the manager of the drive-in. Mad Max 2 stuntman Guy Norris performed some of the stunts. The soundtrack includes contemporary popular music performed by such bands as Kids in the Kitchen and Hunters and Collectors. The song during the rolling credits is "Playing With Fire" by Lisa Edwards.

== Plot ==
In the near future, the economy has collapsed and crime waves sweep the inner cities. The manufacturing industry has shrunk to the point where cars are a commodity and parts are fought over between salvage companies and roving gangs. Australia, the US, and North Korea are the only functioning nation-states left on earth. In an attempt to control the crime-waves, a chain of drive-in theatres is seized by the state and turned into concentration camps for the undesirables and unemployed youth. The dirty drive-ins are surrounded by high fences, and the roads leading to them (called Security Roads or "S-Roads") cannot be walked on, and are electrified. Police collaborate with the drive-in owners to sabotage cars of unsuspecting visitors; however, some who know the true nature of the drive-ins come voluntarily for the shelter and food. Broken cars are continually collected at these facilities. The prisoners are allowed easy access to drugs, alcohol, junk food, exploitation films, and new wave music. These, coupled with the awful conditions on the outside, engineer an atmosphere of complacency and hopelessness so that the inmates will accept their fate and not attempt to escape before they are euthanised.

Jimmy "Crabs" Rossini, a young fitness enthusiast, sneaks off in his brother's vintage Chevy to take his girlfriend, Carmen, to the local Star Drive-In. He tells the owner they are unemployed to get a discounted rate. While Crabs is intimate with Carmen, the rear wheels of his car are stolen, and Crabs discovers the police are responsible. Crabs complains to the owner, who refuses to help until morning. The next morning, Crabs and Carmen are amazed at the number of cars still there, many of which have been turned into hovels. The owner, Thompson, pretends to fill out a report and enters them both into the system. He lets them know they will be there for a while, as there are no buses or cabs, and gives them meal tickets to use at the run-down café. Time drags on, and Crabs tries to escape, to no avail.

Trying to climb a fence, Crabs discovers that it is electrified. He locates the wheels he needs but learns his fuel tank has been drained. He steals fuel from a police vehicle, but then finds his engine stripped. Suspecting that Thompson, who receives a stipend for each prisoner, is behind the sabotage, Crabs warns him not to interfere again. Further complicating matters are the confrontations Crabs continues to have with a racist gang. During this time, Carmen makes no attempt to avoid the unhealthy eating and drug culture at the camp. She becomes friends with several of the female inmates, who are successful at indoctrinating her to the encampment's racist mentality that non-white Australians are to blame for society's problems; a situation exacerbated by the arrival of foreigners and illegal immigrants (who cannot be sent back to where they came from as global warming has rendered Europe and most of Asia uninhabitable) trucked into the camp. All attempts by Crabs to talk sense into her fail because she has succumbed to the hopelessness that pervades the encampment, as have many of the other trapped kids that Jimmy tries to interact with.

Crabs makes one more effort at escape: while the majority of the encampment, including Carmen, attend a racist meeting, he hijacks a tow truck. He attempts to sneak out peacefully, but is recognized by Thompson. This leads to a car chase inside the encampment; the police fire automatic weapons at the tow truck, which frightens the prisoners who are hiding in the café. Eventually, Crabs crashes but manages to elude the police on foot. He finds Carmen and unsuccessfully attempts to reason with her; he kisses her and wishes her well. Crabs disarms Thompson and forces him to delete him from the government server, but his escape attempt ends in another confrontation with the police; Thompson is accidentally killed, and the remaining policeman hunts down Crabs. Using the lowered ramp of a police tow truck that is parked near the main entrance, Crabs launches another vehicle over the fence and lands on the S-Road, successfully driving away to freedom.

== Cast ==
- Ned Manning as Jimmy 'Crabs' Rossini
- Natalie McCurry as Carmen
- Peter Whitford as Thompson
- Wilbur Wilde as Hazza
- Dave Gibson as Dave
- Sandie Lillingston as Beth
- Ollie Hall as Frank Rossini
- Lyn Collingwood as Fay
- Nikki McWaters as Shirl
- Melissa Davis as Narelle
- Margi di Ferranti as Jill
- Desirée Smith as Tracey
- Murray Fahey as Mickey
- Jeremy Shadlow as Jeff
- Brett Climo as Don
- Alan McQueen as Accident Cop
- Ken Snodgrass as Accident Cop
- Bill Lyle as Drive-In Cop
- Garry Who as Drive-In Cop
- Bernadette Foster as Momma Rossini
- Ron Sinclair as Roger McManus
- Gandhi MacIntyre as Indian
- David Jones as TV Newsreader

== Production ==
The movie was based on a short story by Peter Carey, although Brian Trenchard-Smith says he had not read it when he came on board the project. A previous director had been attached but had pulled out. "I came in, took a week, and welded the best elements from the first three drafts together, boosting the social comment," says Trenchard-Smith.

The film was shot over 35 days at a drive-in theatre in Matraville starting on 9 September 1985. Funding came from the New South Wales Film Corporation. The director said of the film that:

The Drive-In is, of course, an allegory for the junk values of the eighties, which our hero sees as a prison. The last 20 minutes of the film - the escape - is the desperate blazing climax, but the whole film has a feeling of high style, of heightened or enhanced reality - a little bit over the top, but retaining a reality that the public will accept.

The final stunt by Guy Norris cost around $75,000, more than any previous single stunt in Australia, and set a world record for a jump by a truck: 162 feet (49 m).

== Release ==
Dead End Drive-In grossed $68,000 at the box office in Australia. It was released on DVD in the US by Image Entertainment on 20 September 2011, and in the UK by Arrow Video in April 2013.

== Reception ==
Michael Wilmington of the Los Angeles Times called it an "exciting and offbeat" clone of Mad Max 2 that is "worth looking for." Ian Berriman of SFX rated it 3.5/5 stars and wrote that the film's premise is unconvincing, but the production design is impressive. Chris Holt of Starburst rated it 6/10 and cited the atmosphere and style as saving graces in a film where "not all that much happens" and the performances are poor. Bill Gibron of DVD Verdict wrote that the film's themes are "cliché and lame" and the film tries too hard without going far enough. Luke Buckmaster of Senses of Cinema called it Trenchard-Smith's "magnum opus" and "a perfectly gloomy fusion of physical objects juxtaposed with the story’s otherworldly elements and creepy dystopian undercurrents."

Quentin Tarantino has cited Dead End Drive-In as his favorite film from Trenchard-Smith.

=== Accolades ===
Production designer Lawrence Eastwood was nominated for Best Production Design at the 1986 AFI Awards.

== Legacy ==
Dead End Drive-In was included in Not Quite Hollywood: The Wild, Untold Story of Ozploitation!, a documentary about Ozploitation films.

Canadian punk band from Vancouver, Dead End Drive-In, takes their name from this film.

== See also ==
- Cinema of Australia
