= The Set (film) =

- Directed by: Frank Brittain
- Written by: Diane Brittain; Roger Ward; Kenneth Johnson (special material)
- Based on: The Set by Roger Ward
- Produced by: Frank Brittain
- Starring: Sean McEuan; Rod Mullinar; Hazel Phillips
- Cinematography: Sándor Siro
- Edited by: Bob Ritchie
- Music by: Sven Libaek
- Production company: Mawson Continental Pictures
- Distributed by: David Hannay Productions
- Release date: 4 February 1970
- Running time: 102 minutes
- Country: Australia
- Language: English
- Budget: $60,000

The Set is a 1970 Australian drama film directed by Frank Brittain and produced by David Hannay and adapted from the unpublished novel by Roger Ward. It was the first feature film in Australia to have homosexuality as a main theme.

== Plot ==
Paul Lawrence is a working-class man who dates Cara, sells shirts at a Sydney department store, and dreams of attending art school. Cara leaves for London and Paul becomes the protege of designer Marie Rosefield. Through this he enters the 'set', the world of Sydney art society.

Rosefield is friends with Mark Bronoski, an artist who commissions Paul to design a set for British stage director, John L. Fredericks. Paul is helped by art student Tony Brown, who is dating Paul's cousin, Kim Sylvester. Paul and Tony begin a homosexual affair. Kim's mother Peggy has an affair with Bronoski.

Paul and Tony break up and Paul attempts suicide. He is reunited with Cara.

== Cast ==
- Sean McEuan (later acted as Sean Myers) as Paul Lawrence
- Rod Mullinar as Tony Brown
- Hazel Phillips as Peggy Sylvester
- Denis Doonan as Mark Bronoski
- Amber Rodgers as Cara
- Brenda Senders as Marie Rosefield
- Ann Aczel as Leigh Radford
- Michael Charnley as John L Fredericks
- Bronwyn Barber as Kim Sylvester
- Elsa Jacoby as Baroness Bronoski
- Tracy Lee as Theo
- Les Berryman
- Murel Hopkins
- Hugh Sawkins
- Ken "Kandy" Johnson

== Production ==
The script was based on an unpublished novel, written during the sixties, by Australian actor Roger Ward. It was based on diaries he had kept since 1954 reflecting on sexual mores in Australia. The original title of the novel was 'You can never please a people' and was based on Ward's experience in the theatrical world, using the lives of friends of his and his own experiences as a basis. Indeed, the character of John L. Fredericks was based on Sir Robert Helpmann. The actor who played him, Michael Charnley, when told who he was playing, said "My God, I haven't seen Bobby since he lifted me in Swan Lake!".

Ward showed the manuscript to Ed Devereaux who suggested Ward take it to American producer Frank Brittain, who had just made Journey Out of Darkness (1967) and wanted to direct Australian films. Brittain asked Ward to rewrite the material and emphasise the homosexual content. It had not been Ward's goal to have the film made with an emphasis on the gay elements of the story. The original novel was not intended as a gay novel per se, but depicted gay characters as part of wider everyday life. It was the producer's 24-year-old third wife, Dianne Brittain, who upon reading the book pertaining to the purchase of film rights, noted the presence of homosexual characters and told Brittain he would have to buy it as "This guy describes two men making luuurve". According to Ward, the script was rewritten by Dianne Brittain as well as novelist Elizabeth Kata.

Finance was reportedly obtained from a Newcastle industrialist, Richard Mawson.

The film was shot in early 1969. No sets were used, with filming taking place in private houses on Sydney's north shore and in Paddington. Production was highly publicised, in part due to a nude appearance by TV personality Hazel Phillips. Roger Ward later said he was unhappy with the experience:

I was devastated to see the ruination of a previously polished and highly tuned script and spent my short time on set leaping in front of the cameras yelling, "Cut! That is not the dialogue". It got to the stage that the actors were ignoring the director and coming to me in a clandestine manner to ask for interpretations and the correct lines to say. Understandably the director was angered by this and I was packed up and sent out of town on a phony publicity tour so a lot of the film went through without my input or salvaging and ended up in what I thought at the time was a 'cringeworthy state'. So the risks I faced at that time, and they were real risks and they did eventuate, was one of being a laughing stock, of being embarrassed for creating such a badly written script.

The cast of the film was eclectic, featuring professional actor Rod Mullinar, who had an extensive track record in the Crawford stable of productions including Homicide, Division 4 and Matlock Police and went onto appear in Against the Wind and Prisoner. Well-known TV personality Hazel Philips was cast as lead character Peggy Sylvester by producer Frank Brittain, but was not the first choice of writer Ward, who wanted Carol Raye for the role. On casting, Ward said:

Frank chose Hazel Phillips. A non-actress at the time, she was a trier and today, 30 years later, her performance stands up ok, but then, i thought she was a disaster. The lead guy who plays Paul, was an unknown called Sean McEuan, 21 years old, soft, sensitive. I hated him. But looking back he was marvellous. To this day he was a great actor. Micheal Charnley was great, but others were hopeless. Non actors were used when strong actors were needed to deliver such dialogue.

Other casting of note were cameo appearances from Sydney 'gay icons' Ken 'Kandy' Johnson and Tracey Lee. Lee (real name Maxwell Ritchie) was a cabaret artiste and female impersonator who had been active on the Sydney club scene as a female impersonator since 1953. He created the persona of Tracey Lee in 1959. Johnson, who started drag performances at parties in the early 60's, became a Sydney club entrepreneur in Sydney's 'camp' scene, first opening Kandy's Garden of Eden in Enmore, became a partner in night club The Purple Onion, and opened Ken's Karate Klub, the sauna which became Ken's of Kensington, before closing in 2012.

A report in the Sydney Morning Herald from January 1969 claimed that violence had erupted between Mullinar and Johnson when Mullinar, as union shop steward on the film, asked Johnson to produce a union card. Johnson was not a union member.

== Release ==
The censor demanded a dozen cuts before the film was passed for export. The producers appealed and in the end, only four words were deleted. The film was refused registration as an Australian quota production under the quality clause of the New South Wales Film Quota Act.

The film was not a success at the box office. However, it has since come to be regarded as a cult movie in part because of its depiction of homosexuality.

Ward's original novel was finally published in 2011. He claimed he was working on a sequel.

The Set was given its first home entertainment release on DVD and VOD, shortly after its 50th anniversary by Bounty Films. The DVD included extensive interviews with the remaining cast and crew, a PDF of Ward's novel, never been before cut and bonus scenes and a 32-page booklet with original newspaper articles and ads from Roger Ward's personal collection.
