= Cops L.A.C. =

Australian television police drama

- Intertitle
- Also known as: Cops: Local Area Command
- Genre: Police procedural Drama
- Starring: Kate Ritchie; Martin Dingle-Wall; Ria Vandervis; Tom O'Sullivan; Kelly Paterniti; Graeme Squires; Gary Sweet; Denise Roberts; Roy Billing; Damian De Montemas
- Theme music composer: "Howlin' for You" by The Black Keys
- Country of origin: Australia
- Original language: English
- No. of seasons: 1
- No. of episodes: 13

Production
- Executive producer: Jo Horsburgh
- Producer: Lisa Scott
- Production locations: Sydney, New South Wales
- Cinematography: Russell Bacon
- Running time: Approximately 1 hour
- Production companies: Nine Films & Television Pty Limited

Original release
- Network: Nine Network
- Release: 2 September – 11 November 2010

Related
- Rescue: Special Ops

Cops L.A.C. (Cops: Local Area Command) is a 2010 Australian television police drama, which screened on the Nine Network. The series followed the work of officers at the Seaview Local Area Command, a fictitious police response area of the 'State Police' set in harbourside Sydney, New South Wales. The first series premiered on 2 September 2010, in the same timeslot of Network Ten's police drama Rush.

On 22 November 2010, the Nine Network discontinued the show due to the high production costs.

== Cast ==
=== Main cast ===
| Actor | Role | First Episode | Last Episode |
|---|---|---|---|
| Kate Ritchie | Det. Senior Constable Samantha 'Sam' Cooper | 1.01 | 1.13 |
| Martin Dingle-Wall | Det. Senior Constable Rhys Llewellyn | 1.01 | 1.13 |
| Ria Vandervis | Det. Senior Constable Roxanne Perez | 1.01 | 1.13 |
| Tom O'Sullivan | Senior Constable Nathan Holt | 1.01 | 1.13 |
| Kelly Paterniti | Constable Priscilla Smith 'Smithy' | 1.01 | 1.13 |
| Graeme Squires | Probationary Constable Daniel van der Mark | 1.01 | 1.13 |
| Gary Sweet | Superintendent Jack Finch | 1.01 | 1.13 |
| Denise Roberts | Det. Inspector Dianne Pappas | 1.01 | 1.13 |
| Roy Billing | Senior Sergeant Graeme Sinclair | 1.01 | 1.13 |
| Damian De Montemas | Senior Constable Matt 'Matilda' Hilton | 1.01 | 1.13 |

=== Recurring cast ===
| Actor | Role | First Episode | Last Episode |
|---|---|---|---|
| Ivy Mak | Fran Barker | 1.01 | 1.13 |
| Sophie Katanis | Constable Terese Drake | 1.01 | 1.08 |
| Jonny Pasvolsky | Zac Butler | 1.03 | 1.13 |

=== Guests ===
| Actor | Role | Episodes |
|---|---|---|
| Abi Tucker | Nina Blunt / Amanda Hodge | 1 episode |
| Anya Beyersdorf | Skye Duncan | 1 episode |
| Brett Climo | Dave | 1 episode |
| Corey Page | Richard | 1 episode |
| Danny Roberts | Brett | 1 episode |
| Ellen Grimshaw | Alicia | 1 episode |
| Indiana Evans | Kylie Tremaine | 1 episode |
| Jacinta Stapleton | Kate Nolan | 1 episode |
| Jeremy Lindsay Taylor | Daker Simms | 1 episode |
| Jessica Napier | Natalie | 1 episode |
| Jessica Tovey | Tash | 1 episode |
| John Atkinson | Captain Timochenko | 1 episode |
| John O'Hare | Matthew | 1 episode |
| Kate Fitzpatrick | Meg Sinclair | 3 episodes |
| Laurie Foell | Gillian Lothar | 1 episode |
| Lisa Chappell | Justine Taylor | 1 episode |
| Lucy Bell | Neighbour | 1 episode |
| Martin Vaughan | Tim | 1 episode |
| Matt Holmes | Ian Lothar | 1 episode |
| Matthew Le Nevez | Ben Ellis | 1 episode |
| Nathaniel Buzolic | Jahrryde | 1 episode |
| Petra Yared | Marielle | 1 episode |
| Renai Caruso | Sonia Bolton | 1 episode |
| Robert Taylor | Tom O'Neill | 1 episode |
| Ross Newton | Lionel Tibbs | 1 episode |
| Salvatore Coco | William | 1 episode |
| Sharon Millerchip | Fiona | 1 episode |
| Simon Lyndon | Cameron | 1 episode |
| Tabrett Bethell | Eve Louizos | 1 episode |
| Tim Pocock | Lance | 1 episode |
| Vince Colosimo | Dominic Salter | 1 episode |
| Zoe Carides | Alison Bristow | 1 episode |

== Plot ==
Cops L.A.C. revolves around the police operations of Seaview Local Area Command. Superintendent Jack Finch, a seasoned officer, is the Local Area Commander, with Crime Manager Detective Inspector Diane Pappas at his side. The uniformed officers stationed at Seaview handle anything from general police response calls to investigation of assaults and muggings, with detectives dealing with cases involving drug dealers and car crashes, shootings, stabbings, and armed robbery.

== Production ==
The first series consisted of 13 episodes and was initiated by Jo Horsburgh and commissioned by the Nine Network in 2009, it was produced by Diane Haddon, Lisa Scott and in-house by the Nine Network Drama Department. Production started on 27 May 2010 and ended on 11 November 2010, after various scheduling changes. Tim Pye, a writer on the series described the show as "like The Bill, but with a higher body count." When researching the real-life Local Area Command, he discovered "the more you research the business of policing, the more wondrous it is that people do it… But they stick with it and love it." Filming wrapped up for the first series in mid-September 2010.

== Episodes ==
| No. overall | No. in series | Title | Directed by | Written by | Original release date |
|---|---|---|---|---|---|
| 1 | 1 | "The Learning Curve" | Geoff Bennett | Tim Pye | 2 September 2010 |
The detectives and uniformed cops of a busy Local Area Command uncover a daring homicide while investigating a car accident. Detectives Sam and Rhys devise a radical sting operation to catch a killer. On her first day in uniform, Priscilla's police career has an explosive start. L.A.C. boss Jack Finch needs all his diplomatic skills when the son of a US Navy Admiral is arrested for drink driving, and Graeme's life is forever changed after his retirement announcement.
| 2 | 2 | "A Veil of Tears" | Geoff Bennett | Tim Pye | 9 September 2010 |
A routine police call-out turns to tragedy when a male stripper is murdered the day after an out-of-control hens night, and Roxanne is forced to give Dan a crash course in police discipline after Dan is nearly killed during an arrest.
| 3 | 3 | "Running Scared" | David Caesar | Chris Hawkshaw | 16 September 2010 |
After Roxanne becomes involved in the death of an armed robber suspect, her career becomes under threat. Meanwhile, Rhys and Sam investigate a theft at a local jewellery store, which uncovers a collection of family gang crime. Sam tries to keep a secret about her former relationship with a prisoner and Dan saves an injured persons life.
| 4 | 4 | "I'll See You" | David Caesar | Shelley Birse | 23 September 2010 |
When a body is found in a luxury apartment, the detectives suspect an identity-thief of murder and fraud. Sam fears for her career when her ex-boyfriend is released from prison and moves into the local area.
| 5 | 5 | "The Killer Wore Sneakers" | Karl Zwicky | Andrew Kelly | 30 September 2010 |
When the target of a police investigation is found murdered, Rhys and Sam uncover a web of diamond smuggling, infidelity and workplace corruption. Meanwhile, Priscilla is seduced into a dangerous relationship with an Iraq war veteran, and Finch demands results when a sting operation ends in disaster for the cops.
| 6 | 6 | "Lost Girls" | Karl Zwicky | Chris Hawkshaw | 7 October 2010 |
Sam and Rhys discover a dead pimp and an underage prostitution racket while searching for a runaway teenager. Roxanne goes undercover on the streets of Kings Cross to locate a schoolgirl suspected of murder.
| 7 | 7 | "Killer Secret" | Geoff Bennett | Tim Pye & Lesley Lewis | 14 October 2010 |
Sam and Rhys suspect an armed robber of a revenge killing, but the investigation takes a surprise turn when the murder weapon is discovered. Priscilla fears for her career after an embarrassing mistake at a crime scene.
| 8 | 8 | "Blood Types" | Geoff Bennett | Chris Hawkshaw | 21 October 2010 |
Tragedy strikes the L.A.C when one of the team is shot during a brawl in a local cemetery. When a man is found with a stake through his heart, the detectives investigate the world of suburban vampires. Also, it is assessment time for the probationary constables and Priscilla and Dan will do anything to pass.
| 9 | 9 | "Old Love" | Arnie Custo | Matt Ford | 28 October 2010 |
When a local teacher is killed, the detectives are convinced a notorious standover man is responsible. Nathan questions his judgement as he struggles to deal with the impact of killing a homeless man.
| 10 | 10 | "Ghost House" | Arnie Custo | Andrew Kelly | 4 November 2010 |
Roxanne and Dan make a gruesome discovery at a derelict house used for ghost-spotting tours. Sam is forced to admit her true feelings for her jailbird ex, Zac Butler. Graeme's life changes forever when a hit-and-run victim dies.
| 11 | 11 | "Illegal Dumping" | Karl Zwicky | Drew Proffitt | 4 November 2010 |
Sam and Rhys investigate the murder of a vet with an elaborate double-life as a swinger. Priscilla reunites a missing person with his brother, with surprising results. Sam's romantic plans with Zac are thrown into disarray by an unexpected proposal.
| 12 | 12 | "Ladies' Night" | Karl Zwicky | Chris Hawkshaw | 11 November 2010 |
Nathan and Priscilla are stuck in a house booby-trapped with elaborate home-made explosives. A dispute over a winning lottery ticket helps the detectives solve the murder of a cross-dresser.
| 13 | 13 | "Life Is a Rodio" | David Caesar | Tim Pye | 11 November 2010 |
The cops investigate a gang of ram-raiders they suspect of planning a multi-million dollar heist. Rhys suspects Sam's boyfriend of being the mastermind behind a deadly criminal conspiracy. Also, tragedy strikes the L.A.C once again after one of the main officers is killed.

== Ratings ==
| Episode | Air date | Timeslot | Viewers | Nightly Rank | Weekly Rank |
|---|---|---|---|---|---|
| 1.01 | 2 September 2010 | Thursday 8:30pm | 1,168,000 | 4 | 25 |
| 1.02 | 9 September 2010 | Thursday 8:30pm | 925,000 | 11 | 46 |
| 1.03 | 16 September 2010 | Thursday 8:30pm | 763,000 | 14 | 67 |
| 1.04 | 23 September 2010 | Thursday 8:30pm | 529,000 (did not air in Melbourne) | 22 | N/A |
| 1.05 | 30 September 2010 | Thursday 8:30pm | 715,000 | 17 | 74 |
| 1.06 | 7 October 2010 | Thursday 8:30pm | 670,000 | 14 | 65 |
| 1.07 | 14 October 2010 | Thursday 8:30pm | 681,000 | 13 | 62 |
| 1.08 | 21 October 2010 | Thursday 9:30pm | 487,000 | 23 | N/A |
| 1.09 | 28 October 2010 | Thursday 9:30pm | 560,000 | 21 | 99 |
| 1.10 | 4 November 2010 | Thursday 9:30pm | 595,000 | 20 | 90 |
| 1.11 | 4 November 2010 | Thursday 10:30pm | 410,000 | 31 | N/A |
| 1.12 | 11 November 2010 | Thursday 9:30pm | 574,000 | 22 | 93 |
| 1.13 | 11 November 2010 | Thursday 10:30pm | 440,000 | 27 | N/A |
| Series Average | --- | --- | 655,000 | 18 | N/A |

== Home media ==
The season was released on DVD as a three-disc set, under the title of Cops: Local Area Command – The Complete Series on 6 January 2011.

| Title | Format | Ep # | Discs | Region 4 (Australia) | Special features | Distributors |
|---|---|---|---|---|---|---|
| Cops L.A.C. (Complete Series) | DVD | 13 | 03 | 6 January 2011 | None | Roadshow Entertainment |
