= Until Tomorrow (TV series) =

Television series

- Genre: Soap opera Drama
- Created by: Reg Watson
- Country of origin: Australia
- Original language: English
- No. of seasons: 1
- No. of episodes: 180

Production
- Running time: 30mins
- Production company: Reg Grundy Organisation

Original release
- Network: Seven Network
- Release: January 28, 1975 – 1976

Until Tomorrow is an Australian television soap opera created by Reg Watson. The series was produced in colour by the Reg Grundy Organisation for the Seven Network in 1975. It was the second soap opera made by the Reg Grundy Organisation, the first having been Class of '74. It is notable for having been made in Brisbane as opposed to Sydney or Melbourne, and was one of the few Australian soap operas produced for a daytime slot, screening at 2.30 pm in Sydney and 1.30pm in Melbourne.

== Series synopsis ==
Until Tomorrow examined the activities of various residents of the suburban Vale Street. Storylines involved revenge plots, murder, affairs, and blindness. The cast included Ron Cadee as Bill Wainwright, the corner shop keeper; television personality Hazel Phillips as Marge Stewart, a "widowed gossip on the look out for a mate"; Kaye Stevenson, Muriel Watson, Sue Robinson, Babette Stephens, and Barry Otto.

== Critical response ==
The Sun-Herald, TV writer Allen Glover, said that Until Tomorrow had "the edge over the American serials" in that "the characters are Australian – and believable". However TV critic for The Age, John Pinkney, was withering about the show:

Former judge Jackson Kerridge (whose blindness has obliged him to vacate the Bench) is at his distinguished wit’s end about his two daughters.

One girl, recently pushed downstairs by her husband, stands to lose her baby. Sharon, the other, is dating a dangerous criminal. As judges' offspring will, the latter lass works in a milk bar. Well, she doesn’t work, exactly. Amid glittering new props department equipment, she sits all day, chatting to the proprietor about her amorous problems. Perhaps because of the price of extras, no customers ever happen by. For the shopman, a 12-hour day of dragging discourse with listless Sharon is not enough. At knockoff time, he pops around to tell the judge that she is in moral danger. Meanwhile, an old dear named Daphne is writing a slanderous novel about the whole, genteel mess…

Until Tomorrow is one of those rare programmes with which an audience can intimately relate. Most viewing mums will proudly know they could have written the simple-minded script themselves… Perhaps this cheaply semi-pdoruced serial will prove too bad to last. But then again, it could be with us for years; providing homebodies with crude instant rewards – and deepening malnutrition of the spirit.

== Cast ==
- Ron Cadee as Bill Wainwright
- Hazel Phillips as Marge Stewart
- Kaye Stevenson
- Muriel Watson
- Sue Robinson
- Babette Stephens
- Barry Otto as Trevor McKenzie
- John Nash
- Harry Scott

== Broadcast ==
The series debuted in January 1975 and in Sydney screened at 2.30 pm, opposite US serial General Hospital. It experienced low ratings and by July was moved to 11.30 am. It was cancelled after a run of 180 episodes with none of the current storylines concluded in the final episode.

Until Tomorrow was Reg Watson's first Australian soap opera. He went on to devise the more successful soap operas The Young Doctors (1976), The Restless Years (1977), Prisoner (1979), Sons and Daughters (1981), and Neighbours (1985).
