= Hazel Phillips =

Entertainer, actress, singer and television presenter

Hazel Phillips OAM
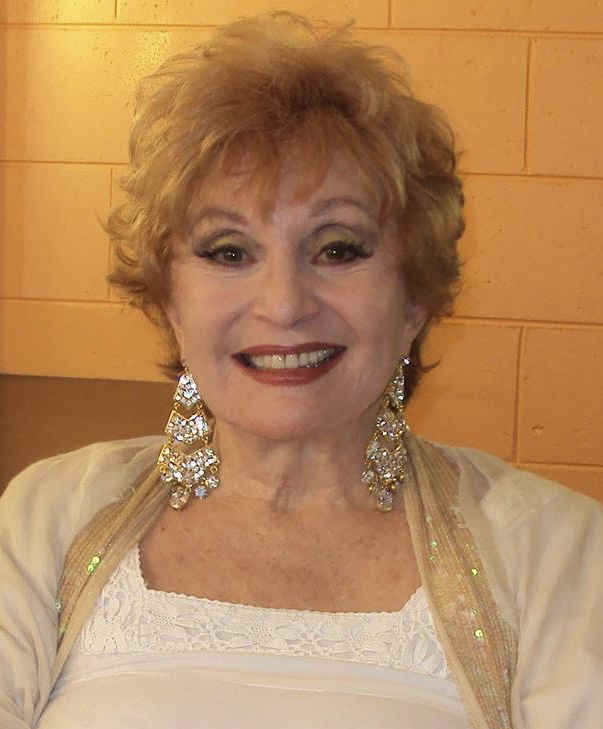
- Born: Hazel Julia Lovegrove; 17 November 1929 (age 97); Battersea, County of London, England, United Kingdom
- Occupations: Singer; television personality; actress; talk show hostess; entertainer
- Years active: 1956–present
- Known for: Girl Talk
- Notable work: Beauty and the Beast; The Mavis Bramston Show; Girl Talk; Number 96; The Set

Hazel Julia Phillips (née Lovegrove) (born 17 November 1929) is a British-Australian singer, actress and television talk show personality with a notable career in Australia.

Phillips is also a playwright, composer and lyricist who has written numerously for the stage, been a compere of radio shows, a newspaper columnist and briefly operated a dinner cabaret restaurant.

She has worked as an interviewer in Hollywood, where she interviewed numerous stars, such as Bing Crosby, Paul Newman and Omar Shariff and Fess Parker.

Phillips has the distinction of playing the world's first lesbian character on TV, the character Marie Crowther on the serial Number 96.

Phillips has appeared in numerous films including the Australian film The Set in 1970 and more recently in 2021, the Netflix film Love and Monsters, and scheduled in a Paramount film starring Sam Neill, and a TV commercial for Ford

She is often depicted as Australia's answer to Betty White in terms of career success and longevity. Since the death of Michael Charlton on 24 August 2025, she is both the oldest living and earliest winning of all of the surviving Gold Logie winners.

== Biography ==
=== Early life ===
Phillips was born as Hazel Lovegrove in Battersea (now Wandsworth), County of London (now south London). She has been singing and dancing since the age of three and in 1948 won the beauty pageant Miss South England. At the age of 20, she became engaged to Bill Phillips, a carpenter turned TV director and they emigrated to Australia as "Ten Pound Poms" in 1950–51, marrying shortly afterwards and having two children: Mark (born 1953) and Scott (born 1955). In 1961, at a time there were no seat belts in vehicles, the family was involved in a serious car accident, and Phillips sustained severe injuries to her chin. Her marriage broke up some time afterwards, with Phillips suggesting that the surgeries on her chin, her husband's infidelity and an ectopic pregnancy contributed to the break-up.

=== Early career ===
Phillips started her career at radio 2UW, having won a talent contest for Miss Television in Australia. Active in television since its inception in Australia, she became one of the first personalities on Network Seven. in 1963, Phillips made her break into show business with a role on the talk show Beauty and the Beast opposite beast Eric Baume. She also began to appear on the satirical The Mavis Bramston Show, where she became a regular after having to choose between Bramston and Beauty and the Beast.

=== Gold Logie, television, film and theatre ===
After leaving the Seven network she hosted the midday talk show Girl Talk on the fledgling Network Ten, for which she won the Gold Logie Award for the most popular female personality on Australian television in 1967. This was won jointly with Graham Kennedy who won the male award. She was the second female star to win that honour after entertainer Lorrae Desmond, who won in 1962. She had guest roles on numerous television shows including Number 96 (as a lesbian sharing a flat with Vera), Matlock Police, A Country Practice, G.P. and Pacific Drive, as well as mini-series Bride of Christ.

Films include The Set (as a nude swimmer), Midnight Dancer, Walking Emily Home and Love and Monsters.

Theatre roles starting from 1956 include The Circle, Henry V, Pride and Prejudice and The Merry Wives of Windsor, and stage versions of Grease and The Mavis Bramston Show.

She also featured in a Marilyn Monroe Cabaret Show in 2002.

In 2020, Phillips spoke to the Studio 10 program about gender pay gaps in the entertainment industry, stating female television hosts were paid less than their male counterparts, and that in the 1960s she had been paid less than one-tenth of the salaries paid to stars like Graham Kennedy and Don Lane.

== Honours and awards ==
Year	Association	Category	Work	Result
2005	Government of Australia - Queen's Birthday Honours	Medal of the Order of Australia (OAM)	For service to the entertainment industry, particularly in the areas of the performing arts and television, and to the community as a fundraiser for charitable groups.	Honoured
1967	Logie Awards	Gold Logie	Girl Talk	Won

== Autobiography ==
In 2008, her autobiography, Black River, Bright Star (ISBN 9781921406171), was published by Zeus Publications.

== Health ==
Phillips is an activist for alternative medicine, she suffered a mild heart attack in 2009, and underwent a hip replacement

== Australia’s Got Talent ==
In 2011, Phillips performed in the fifth series of Australia's Got Talent. She sang the Frank Sinatra song "You Make Me Feel So Young" and the Marilyn Monroe song Diamonds Are a Girl's Best Friend. Phillips reached the semi-finals in the over-65 category, but was eliminated in the public vote. She still performs with her son Scott’s quartet as a vocalist on occasion.

== Filmography ==
=== Film ===
Year	Title	Role	Notes
1970	The Set	Peggy Sylvester	
1987	Midnight Dancer	Doreen	
1996	Little White Lies		
2000	Walking Emily Home	Auntie	
2012	Trinkets	Rose Hayes	Short film
2012	Edna	Edna	Short film
2020	Love and Monsters	Janice	

=== Television ===
Year	Title	Role	Notes
1960	Bentley's Bandbox	Herself	
1961	The Lorrae Desmond Show	Herself as guest	
1964	The Mavis Bramston Show	Various	
1964	Beauty and the Beast	Herself as panellist	
1966	The Barry Crocker Show	Herself as guest	
1966	Girl Talk	Herself as host	
1969	Tonight with Don Lane	Herself as guest	
1971	The Comedy Game		Episode: "Arthur"
1972	Birds in the Bush	Maggie	
1972	Boney	Candy Barr	Episode: "Boney Buys a Coffin"
1972	Matlock Police	Thelma Brewster	Episode: "Titch"
1973	Matlock Police	Lucy McCain	Episode: "The Recurrence of Brandy McBain"
1973	Number 96	Marie Crowther	
1973	Ryan	Lorna	Episode: "Way Back"
1975	Until Tomorrow	Marge Stewart	
1977–1982	The Mike Walsh Show	Herself as guest	3 episodes
1978	Chopper Squad	Maureen McNair	Episode: "Lifeboat"
1986	Kids 21st Birthday Channel Ten Telethon	Herself as guest	TV special
1989	Fields of Fire III	Usherette	
1990	A Country Practice	Blanche Perkins	Episode: "Sisters II: Part 2"
1991	Brides of Christ	Mrs. Purley	Episode: "Diane"
1991–1992	G.P.	Rita Edwards	2 episodes
1994	The Mavis Bramston Show 30th Anniversary Special	Herself as guest	TV special
1995	Midday With Kerri-Anne	Herself as guest	1 episode
1995	Fire	Belle	Episode: "The Rip Off"
1996	Pacific Drive		
1997	Monday To Friday	Herself as guest	1 episode
1997	The Wayne Manifesto	Dottie Fingleton	3 episodes
1998	Misery Guts	American tourist	Episode: "Road to Riches"
1998–1999	Good Morning Australia	Herself as guest	2 episodes
1998–2000	Denise	Herself as guest	2 episodes
2000	Walking Emily Home	Auntie	TV movie
2007	Beauty and the Beast	Herself as panellist	
2007	Mortified	Aunt Ally	Episode: "The Family Tree"
2007	Talking Heads	Herself as guest	1 episode
2011	Australia's Got Talent	Herself as contestant/performer	3 episodes
2012	The Morning Show	Herself as guest	1 episode
2012	Today Tonight	Herself as guest with Carmen Duncan and Denise Drysdale	1 episode
2020	The End	Beth's Grandma	Episode 1.2: "Toxic Shock Syndrome"
2022	Upright	Val (guest role)	Episode 2.2: "Tomatoes"
2023	Studio 10	Herself as guest	1 episode
