= Hope Island (TV series) =

American television series

- Genre: Family drama
- Based on: Ballykissangel by Kieran Prendiville
- Developed by: Mary Hanes; Jason Milligan
- Starring: Cameron Daddo; Suki Kaiser; Duncan Fraser; Haig Sutherland; David Lewis
- Composer: Tim McCauley
- Country of origin: United States
- Original language: English
- No. of seasons: 1
- No. of episodes: 22

Production
- Executive producer: Mary Hanes
- Production locations: Britannia Beach, British Columbia, Canada
- Running time: 60 minutes
- Production companies: Paxson Entertainment; Paramount Network Television; Lions Gate Television

Original release
- Network: PAX TV
- Release: September 12, 1999 – April 3, 2000

Hope Island is an American drama series that originally aired on PAX TV from September 12, 1999, until April 3, 2000. It was based on Ballykissangel, a popular Irish drama created by Kieran Prendiville that aired on BBC One.

The series ran for 22 episodes, and focused on the residents of the fictional Hope Island, a small island off mainland Washington State (likely a part of the San Juan Islands though an island of the same name exists in the Case Inlet in the South Puget Sound) with a population of 1,998.

== Summary ==
Hope Island revolves around the residents of the island.

Daniel Cooper, a newly ordained minister, is called to the island to fix up and restart an old church that has been empty and neglected for 30 years. Upon arriving, Daniel finds the situation is not quite what he expected it to be, and he struggles knowing if he should stay or not. However, the quirky residents of the island quickly grow on him, and he soon becomes an invaluable member of the community.

With a large ensemble cast, Hope Island is full of quirky and lovable characters. There's Alex Stone, the cynical local Widow's Walk Restaurant/Inn owner, and her son Dylan, who attends the Hope Island Elementary School. Town mayor Brian Brewster always has some outlandish scheme up his sleeve, and his mysterious side-kick Nub Flanders is always there to help. Ruby and Bonita (the mother and daughter who own the general store), haven't spoken to each other in 17 years. Daughter of the mayor, Molly Brewster is a lifelong island native, and her boyfriend Kevin Mitchum is the islands only police officer (who rarely deals with anything worse than a missing autographed picture). These are just a few of the many people on the island.

Hope Island explores an array of family-oriented themes including the challenges of raising children, maintaining a sense of family, love, greed, loyalty and fighting for ones faith and beliefs, among others.... The series boasts a rich and colorful cast of characters, whose grit and individuality lead to strong drama and whimsical comedy."

== Cast ==
- Cameron Daddo as Rev. Daniel Cooper
- Suki Kaiser as Alex Stone
- Duncan Fraser as Brian Brewster
- Haig Sutherland as Nub Flanders
- Allison Hossack as Molly Brewster
- David Lewis as Kevin Mitchum
- Matthew Walker as Father Mac
- Beverley Elliot as Bonita Vasquez
- Gina Stockdale as Ruby Vasquez
- Brian Jenson as Boris Obolenski
- Max Peters as Dylan Stone
- Veena Sood as Callie Pender

== Episodes ==
No.	Title	Directed by	Written by	Original release date
1	"Look One Way and Row Another"	Brad Turner	Mary Hanes & Jason Milligan	September 12, 1999
2	"Each Tub Must Stand on Its Own Bottom"	Bill Corcoran	Mary Hanes & Jason Milligan	September 19, 1999
3	"It Takes a Voyage to Learn"	Anne Wheeler	Mary Hanes	September 26, 1999
4	"Dear, Dear Bread and Beer, if I Were Rich, I Wouldn't Be Here"	Neill Fearnley	Norman Morrill	October 3, 1999
5	"The Whole Kettle of Fish"	Bill Corcoran	Mary Hanes & Jason Milligan	October 10, 1999
6	"In a Bit of a Tight"	Neill Fearnley	Mary Hanes & Jason Milligan	October 18, 1999
7	"You Can't Look at the Sea Without Wishing for Wings"	Bill Corcoran	Julie Sayres	October 25, 1999
8	"From Stern to Stern"	Rick Stevenson	Gary R. Johnson	November 1, 1999
9	"Sailing Under False Colors"	Penelope Buitenhuis	Story by : Mary Hanes & Jason Milligan; Teleplay by : Jason Milligan	November 8, 1999
10	"Ships That Pass in the Night"	Mike Rohl	Dana Reston	November 15, 1999
11	"Red Sky at Morning, Sailor Take Warning"	Neill Fearnley	Jason Milligan	November 22, 1999
12	"Batten Down the Hatches"	Peter DeLuise	Story by : Liz Coe; Teleplay by : Ann Powell	November 29, 1999
13	"Don't Give Up the Ship"	Ken Jubenvill	Norman Morrill	December 13, 1999
14	"Twenty Sailors Around a Buttonhole"	Mike Rohl	John Whelpley	January 10, 2000
15	"A Sailor Who's Lost His Leg Doesn't Miss His Boot"	Bill Corcoran	Mary Hanes	January 24, 2000
16	"Everyone Must Row with the Oar He Has"	Vic Sarin	Gary R. Johnson	February 14, 2000
17	"Promises Made in a Storm Are Forgotten on a Calm Sea: Part 1"	Brenton Spencer	Ken Hanes	February 28, 2000
18	"New Skies Call for New Duties: Part 2"	Bill Corcoran	Ken Hanes	March 6, 2000
19	"A Rising Tide Takes All Boats"	Rick Stevenson	Norman Morrill	March 13, 2000
20	"Never Burn Your Tongue on the Admiral's Broth"	Neill Fearnley	Gary R. Johnson	March 20, 2000
21	"It Blew So Hard It Took Two Men to Hold One Man's Hair On"	Cameron Daddo	Jason Milligan & Mary Hanes	March 27, 2000
22	"Abandon Ship"	Jonathan Goodwill	Ken Hanes & Mary Hanes	April 3, 2000

== Awards ==
The "Young Artist Awards" nominated Hope Island for the following awards:

Best Family TV Drama Series
Best Performance in a TV Drama Series, Supporting Young Actor - Max Peters

The following episodes were recognized by "Prism Awards", (an organization that is "designed to recognize the accurate depiction of drug, alcohol, and tobacco use and addiction.")

"Ships that Pass in the Night" - received a Prism Commendation
"It Takes a Voyage to Learn" - received a Prism Certificate of Merit
