= Cameron Daddo =

Australian actor, musician and presenter

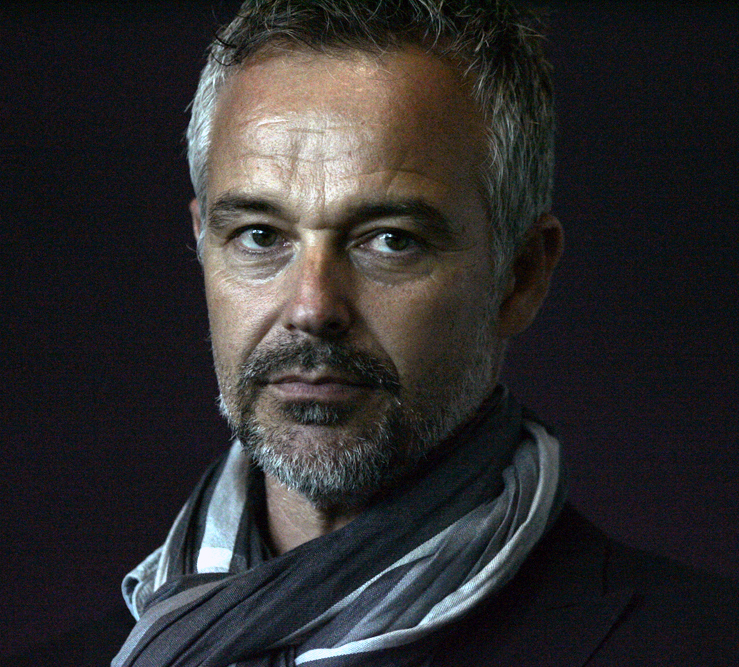
- Daddo in August 2012
- Born: Cameron Peter Daddo; 7 March 1965 (age 61); Melbourne, Victoria, Australia
- Occupations: Actor; musician; presenter
- Years active: 1985–present
- Known for: Perfect Match; F/X: The Series; Hope Island; Pirate Master; She Spies; Home and Away
- Spouse: Alison Brahe (1992–present)
- Children: 3
- Family: Andrew Daddo (brother); Lochie Daddo (brother)
- Awards: Logie Award for Most Popular Actor in a Telemovie or Miniseries; Golden Fiddles (1992); Tracks of Glory (1993)

Cameron Peter Daddo (born 7 March 1965) is an Australian actor, musician presenter and radio host. He is known for hosting 1980s dating game show Perfect Match Australia and 2007 reality show Pirate Master on CBS, as well as playing Brian Peterson in American soap opera Models Inc. and Evan Slater in Australian soap opera Home and Away. He also starred in F/X: The Series, Hope Island, and She Spies.

== Early life ==
Daddo was born in Melbourne, Victoria, on 7 March 1965, to Peter and Bronwen Daddo. One of five children, he grew up on the Mornington Peninsula alongside older sister, Belinda, and three younger brothers, twins Andrew and Jamie, and Lochie. Andrew and Lochie are fellow actors and television presenters.

His father was transferred to the United States when Daddo was sixteen, and he subsequently studied two of his school years in New Jersey. At age eighteen, he returned to Australia, where he graduated from high school.

Daddo began playing piano when he was seven, and at the age of twelve, he taught himself how to play guitar. He also sang in school choirs. His first foray into entertainment began with busking in Melbourne with a friend from school. They went on to form 'The Nearly Smooth Guys', and played in clubs around town. This led to Daddo participating in the Australian version of television show Star Search, making it to the finale and winning the Spokesmodel category.

After scoring a modeling contract, Daddo spent two years filming television advertisements as well as modelling in Japan and Europe.

== Career ==
=== Acting and presenting ===
Daddo's first television role was as host of a children's show called Off the Dish. He soon hosted The Cameron Daddo Cartoon Show, before replacing Greg Evans as the host of dating game show Perfect Match Australia from 1987 to 1988. He was 21 years old, which made him the youngest host of an Australian game show.

Following his hosting roles, Daddo turned his hand to acting, with a role in 1989 miniseries, The Heroes. The same year, he scored the lead role of Huck Finn in the stage musical Big River. Daddo's performance won him a Mo Award, and a Variety Theatre Performer of the Year accolade. The production ran for 15 months with over 1,000 shows.

Daddo next appeared in the 1990 telemovie series Bony, playing a detective and the fictional grandson of Napoleon Bonaparte, the protagonist in 29 detective novels by Arthur Upfield. His character was said to be a white man raised by Aboriginal people. An Aboriginal uncle serves as his mentor. The role won him a People's Choice Award for Best Actor in a Dramatic Series.

In 1992, Daddo won the Logie Award for Most Popular Actor in a Telemovie or Miniseries, for his appearance in the miniseries Golden Fiddles. He won again in 1993 for his portrayal of bicycle champion Don Walker in Tracks of Glory.

Daddo often found himself making it to the final two for potentially career-defining roles – including the lead in Baz Luhrmann's 1992 film Strictly Ballroom, which ultimately went to Paul Mercurio – but missing out. Wanting to further his career, he moved to Los Angeles in 1992 to pursue acting in Hollywood. He was cast in the role of photographer Brian Peterson in the Aaron Spelling Melrose Place spin-off Models Inc., which was cancelled after the first season. He next made a one-off guest appearance in a 1993 episode of The Young Indiana Jones Chronicles.

In 1996, Daddo played Rollie Tyler in F/X: The Series, the character played by Bryan Brown in the film version. He also appeared in the PAX TV network's Hope Island from 1999 to 2000. In 2000, he appeared in Anne of Green Gables: The Continuing Story as American writer, Jack Garrison.

In 2002, Daddo played Darryl Wright, a lead guest character in the episode "Monk and the Earthquake" in the first season of television series Monk. He next appeared as Samuel Clemens in the 2003 television pilot Riverworld, based on the sci-fi novels of the same name. He also played the role of Quentin Cross in the second season of She Spies from 2003 to 2004.

Daddo also had roles in David Lynch's 2006 film Inland Empire, playing Devon Berk's manager and comedy film Big Momma's House 2. In 2007, he hosted the Mark Burnett reality show Pirate Master on CBS, and appeared in the movie Drifter. In 2009, he played the role of Vice President Mitchell Hayworth on 24. He also appeared in episodes of The Mentalist, Nikita, CSI and NCIS.

Daddo starred as the interviewer in an Australian adult romance feature film, SIX LOVERS, which finished production in 2010 and was released in 2012. In 2014, he appeared in the Australian Theatre Company's Los Angeles production of Holding the Man opposite Nate Jones, Roxane Wilson and Adam J. Yeend.

Daddo participated as the subject on a 2011 episode of Who Do You Think You Are?, travelling to the Channel Islands to trace his ancestry.

In 2012, Daddo returned to the Australian stage for the first time in 20 years as Professor Callahan in the Australian production of Legally Blonde. He was cast in the role of Captain Georg Von Trapp in the 2016 Australian tour of the London Palladium production of The Sound of Music opposite Amy Lehpamer in the role of Maria.

Daddo next participated in the 2018 second season of Filthy Rich and Homeless, an SBS documentary series where high-profile Australians hoping to enact positive change swapped their privileged lives to experience homeless life on the streets of Sydney.

From May to June 2020, Daddo appeared in Home and Away as Evan Slater, the estranged father of Ryder Jackson (played by Lukas Radovich).

In 2022, Daddo co-hosted the fifth season of the travel series Luxury Escapes. The same year, he appeared as a 'wildcard' contestant on the Australian series of Dancing with the Stars, but was eliminated in the first episode, when he failed to impress the judges with his tango, scoring 23 out of 40.

Daddo most recently appeared opposite Rebecca Gibney in Sydney Theatre Company's 2025 production of Circle Mirror Transformation.

=== Music ===
Daddo is also a musician, having played in the bands 'The Nearly Smooth Guys' (prior to his acting career) and 'Baby James'. His debut album as a solo artist, "A Long Goodbye", featured Keith Urban on back-up vocals and guitars and reached #2 on the Australian country music charts in 1992.

In 2012, Daddo released the album Ten Songs – and Change. He released another album, Songs from the Shed in 2016, featuring a song called “Steve McQueen”, after having stayed at actor McQueen's house in Palm Springs. In 2020, he released the EP Son and Moon, the title track of which was featured in the television series Home and Away, during his tenure on the show.

As of 2021, Daddo was fronting a new band, 'Cam Daddo and the Paisley Prophets', who perform around Sydney.

Daddo has also written a one-man musical, House Devil, Street Angel.

=== Radio ===
In October 2012, Daddo joined smoothfm as Sunday Mornings host in the 8am to 10am timeslot. In March 2013, Daddo became the host of Mellow Music, airing nightly, from 8pm to midnight, on smoothfm.

In 2022, Daddo collaborated with Nova to launch the podcast series So You Want to Make a TV Show with brother Andrew Daddo, which detailed the creative process behind making scripted television.

Daddo and his wife Alison Brahe have hosted Separate Bathrooms and Other Handy Marriage Tips since 2019, an Acast podcast in which they chat about the journey of their 30-year marriage. As of 2025, the podcast relaunched with Nova Podcasts under the new name of The Heart of It.

== Personal life ==
Daddo met model (and frequent Dolly cover girl) Alison Brahe in 1991 and they married the following year, when Daddo was 26. The couple relocated to Los Angeles in 1992, where they lived for 25 years and had three children. Daddo returned to Australia with his family in 2017, as acting work dried up in Hollywood.

Daddo is an advocate for men's mental health, and set up the charity 'My Men's Team', which offers support to men experiencing adversity.

== Filmography ==
=== Film ===
Year	Title	Role	Notes	Ref.
2001	Anthrax	Sgt Craig Anderson	Feature film	
2003	Stealing Candy	Eddie	Feature film	
2004	Pterodactyl	Professor Michael Lovecraft	Feature film	
2005	Confession	Father Michael Kelly	Feature film	
2005	Six Months Later	John	Short film	
2006	Big Momma's House 2	Casal	Feature film	
2006	Chloe's Prayer	Peter Quinlan	Feature film	
2006	Inland Empire		Feature film	
2007	Hacia la oscuridad (aka Towards Darkness)		Feature film	
2008	Forced Attrition	Limo driver	Short film	
2008	Drifter	Martin	Feature film	
2009	The Perfect Sleep	Rogozhin	Feature film	
2009	Passengers	Tom	Feature film	
2010	Wild Things: Foursome	Ted Wheetly	Feature film	
2010	On a Roll	Frank Jones	Short film	
2012	Outback (aka The Koala Kid or Koala Johnny)	Additional voices	Animated film	
2012	Mayhem	Rodney Fulbright	Short film	
2012	Six Lovers	Interviewer	Feature film	
2013	Sugar	Mr Hill	Short film	
2013	Nerve	Darren Anderson	Feature film	
2014	A Fine Step	Mason Scott	Feature film	
2015	Elle	Dad	Short film	
2015	Brentwood Strangler	Bruce Black	Short film	
2017	Blackmail	Troy	Feature film	
2017	It's Gawd!	Chad	Feature film	
2018	Con Man	Bank executive	Feature film	
2022	How to Please a Woman	Adrian	Feature film	

=== Television ===
Year	Title	Role	Notes	Ref.
1989	The Heroes	Joe Jones	Miniseries	
1990	G.P.	Dr Chris Carroll	1 episode	
1990	Bony	David 'Bony' Bonaparte	TV movie	
1992	Golden Fiddles	Norman Balfour	Miniseries, 2 episodes	
1992	Cluedo	Roger Plum	1 episode	
1992	Tracks of Glory	Walker	Miniseries, 2 episodes	
1992	Bony	Detective David 'Bony' Bonaparte	13 episodes	
1993	Between Love and Hate	Alec	TV movie	
1993	The Young Indiana Jones Chronicles	Jack Anders	1 episode	
1993	The Making of Nothing	Bruce Stoltz	TV movie	
1994–1995	Models Inc.	Brian Petersen	29 episodes	
1996	Strangers	Alan	1 episode	
1996–1998	F/X: The Series	Roland 'Rollie' Tyler	39 episodes	
1999	Witch Hunt	David Overton	TV movie	
1999–2000	Hope Island	Daniel Cooper	22 episodes	
2000	Anne of Green Gables: The Continuing Story	Jack Garrison	Miniseries, 2 episodes	
2000	Celebrity	Kevin	TV movie	
2000	Mentors	Black Bart	1 episode	
2000	Andromeda	Rafe Valentine	1 episode	
2000	The West Wing	Aide #2	1 episode	
2001	Earth: Final Conflict	Jeff Marlowe	1 episode	
2001	The Outer Limits	Alexander Landau	1 episode	
2001	Zebra Lounge	Alan Barnett	TV movie	
2002	Drive Time Murders	Dick Dashton	TV movie	
2002	Monk	Darryl Wright	Season 1, episode: "Monk and the Earthquake"	
2003	CSI: Crime Scene Investigation	Hotel manager	1 episode	
2003	A.U.S.A.	Joe	2 episodes	
2003	Riverworld	Samuel L. 'Sam' Clemens	TV pilot	
2003	The Incredible Mrs. Ritchie	Jim		
2003–2004	She Spies	Quentin Cross	20 episodes	
2004	Summerland	Bryant	1 episode	
2004	CSI: Miami	Stanley Hemming	1 episode	
2005	Category 7: The End of the World	Ross Duffy	2 episodes	
2006	Boston Legal	Sean Wilkes	2 episodes	
2008	Her Only Child (aka Maternal Obsession)	Larry Nowack	TV movie	
2008	Scorched	David Langmore	TV movie	
2008	A Kiss at Midnight	Josh Sherman	TV movie	
2009	Without a Trace	Richard Connelly	1 episode	
2009	24	Vice President Mitchell Hayworth	2 episodes	
2009	Eleventh Hour	Ray Wynne	1 episode	
2009	The Storm		Miniseries, 1 episode	
2010	NCIS	Dan Mayfield	1 episode	
2010	Human Target	Captain Mike Harmen	1 episode	
2011	The Mentalist	David Vance	1 episode	
2011	Leverage	John Drexel	Season 4, episode: "The Long Way Down Job"	
2011	Rizzoli & Isles	Robert Cranston	1 episode	
2011	Oliver's Ghost	Doug McCaffrey	TV movie	
2012	Nikita	President Charles Grayson	2 episodes	
2012	Packed to the Rafters	Adam Goodman	8 episodes	
2012	Beaconsfield	Matthew Gill	TV movie	
2014	The Doctor Blake Mysteries	Howard McArthur	1 episode	
2014	NCIS: Los Angeles	Charles Anderson	2 episodes	
2015	Stitchers	Joe Parks	1 episode	
2015	Romantically Speaking	Henry	TV movie	
2020	Home and Away	Evan Slater / Owen Davidson	34 episodes	
2024	Last Days of the Space Age	Gavin	1 episode	

=== Television – other ===
Year	Title	Role	Notes	Ref.
1986	Off the Dish	Host		
	The Cameron Daddo Cartoon Show	Host		
1987–1988	Perfect Match Australia	Host		
2007	Pirate Master	Host	14 episodes	
2008	My Kid's a Star	Host	6 episodes	
2011	Who Do You Think You Are?	Special guest	1 episode	
2018	Filthy Rich and Homeless	Participant	Documentary series, 4 episodes	
2022	Dancing with the Stars	Contestant	1 episode – eliminated week 1	
2022–2024	Luxury Escapes	Co-host	10 episodes	
2025	The Great Entertainer	Self	Documentary special	

== Theatre ==
Year	Title	Role	Notes	Ref.
1989	Big River	Huckleberry Finn	Her Majesty's Theatre, Sydney with Gordon Frost Productions	
1990	The Hunting of the Snark	The Butcher	The Hills Centre, Sydney, State Theatre, Sydney with Jackson Mayo Productions	
1991	The Wizard of Oz	Scarecrow / Hank	Victorian Arts Centre with Victoria State Opera	
1992	I Hate Hamlet	Andy	Marian St Theatre, Sydney	
	Ouroboros	Phillip	Playwrights Kitchen Ensemble	
	The Crystal Goblet	Michael	Playwrights Kitchen Ensemble	
2010	Love Letters	Andrew Makepeace Ladd III	Westside Waldorf School, Pacific Palisades & Sydney Opera House	
2012–2013	Legally Blonde	Professor Callahan	Sydney Lyric Theatre, QPAC, Brisbane, Princess Theatre, Melbourne with Gordon/Frost	
2014	Holding the Man	John's Dad (Dick) / Tim's Dad	Matrix Theater, Los Angeles with Australian Theatre Company	
2016	The Sound of Music	Captain Georg Von Trapp	Australian tour with London Palladium & Really Useful Company	
2017	The Haunting	Lord Grey	Melbourne Athenaeum with Prince Moo Productions	
2017–2018	The Rocky Horror Show	Narrator	Adelaide Festival Centre, QPAC, Brisbane	
2018	Big River	Pap	Hayes Theatre Company, Sydney	
2018	The True Blue Review	Various	Return Fire Productions	
2019	Once	Da	Eternity Playhouse, Sydney with Darlinghurst Theatre Company	
2025	Circle Mirror Transformation	James	Wharf Theatre, Sydney with STC	

== Discography ==
=== Albums ===
List of albums, with selected chart positions
Title	Album details	Peak chart positions
Title	Album details	AUS
A Long Goodbye	Released: August 1993; Format: CD; Label: Massice (8270072)	91
Ten Songs... and Change	Released: 2011; Format: Digital, streaming; Label: Cameron Daddo	-
Songs from the Shed	Released: 3 December 2015; Format: Digital, streaming; Label: Cameron Daddo	-

=== Singles ===
List of singles, with selected chart positions
Title	Year	Peak chart positions	Album
Title	Year	AUS	Album
"Fifteen Minutes of Fame"	1993	86	A Long Goodbye
"Watching the River Go By"	1993	-	A Long Goodbye

== Awards ==
Year	Work	Award	Category	Result	Ref.
1987	Perfect Match	Logie Awards	Most Popular New Talent	Nominated	
1989	Big River	Mo Awards	Musical Theatre Performer of the Year (Male)	Won	
1989	Big River	Variety	Theatre Performer of the Year	Won	
1990	Bony	People's Choice Awards	Best Actor in a Dramatic Series	Won	
1992	Golden Fiddles	Logie Awards	Most Popular Actor in a Telemovie or Miniseries	Won	
1993	Tracks of Glory	Logie Awards	Most Popular Actor in a Telemovie or Miniseries	Won	
2015	Elle (short)	IndieFEST Film Awards	Best Supporting Actor (Award of Excellence)	Won	
