= Mapantsula =

1988 film

- Directed by: Oliver Schmitz
- Written by: Oliver Schmitz; Thomas Mogotlane
- Produced by: David Hannay; Max Montocchio
- Starring: Thomas Mogotlane
- Cinematography: Rod Stewart
- Edited by: Mark Baard
- Music by: The Ouens
- Production companies: Haverbeam(in association with); One Look Productions(produced by); David Hannay Productions(in association with); What the Hero Wants
- Distributed by: Folkets Bio (Sweden, 1989) (theatrical); California Newsreel (United States, 1989)(video); David Hannay Productions (Australia, 1988); The Home Cinema Group (Australia, 1989) (video)
- Release date: 20 October 1988
- Running time: 104 minutes
- Country: South Africa
- Language: Zulu
- Box office: $8,290

Mapantsula is a 1988 Zulu-language South African crime film directed by Oliver Schmitz and written by Schmitz and Thomas Mogotlane. It tells the story of Johannes 'Panic' Themba Mzolo (Mogotlane), a small-time thief, set against the backdrop of Apartheid. The film's use of flashbacks between Panic's time at the hands of his apartheid jailor 'Stander' (Marcel Van Heerden) and happenings in the Johannesburg township of Soweto depict the injustices black South Africans suffered during apartheid and their struggle for suffrage. The film makes extensive use of political rallies, police brutality and racism to illustrate the effects of apartheid on black South Africans.

It was screened in the Un Certain Regard section at the 1988 Cannes Film Festival. The film was selected as the South African entry for the Best Foreign Language Film at the 62nd Academy Awards, but was not accepted as a nominee.

== Plot ==
Mapantsula begins with cut-scenes between a heated protest and several police vehicles transporting apprehended black South Africans. There is a voice in the background saying that they have violated the Internal Security Act by gathering without permission and inciting a riot. Here we first see Panic who is herded with the rest of the prisoners, including women and children. He is put in a cell with eight other men.

There is a cut-scene to a busy Johannesburg street where Panic and his partner in crime, Dingaan (Darlington Michaels), rob a white South African of his wallet, threatening him with a knife when he attempts to get his money back. After, Panic and Dingaan meet up at a local corner store and recount the event. Laughing, Dingaan says, "Eh man, we should stop this." Panic replies, "You're crazy."

Panic then makes his way home to the Soweto township where he rents a small, one-room house from a landlady he refers to as Ma Mobise (Dolly Rathebe). As he dresses up for a night out, she warns him that she wants him to stay out of trouble, commenting he dresses like a tsotsi, or gangster. Back at the prison, Panic is standing separate of the other prisoners. He demands one of them move out of his way and confronts another when asked why he is there. Panic replies, "The same reason as you." The others do not believe him.

We flashback to Panic at a disco club with his girlfriend Pat and Dingaan. After being hit on by the owner Lucky, she leaves, prompting Panic to go after her. They return to Panic's place. There is another cut to the police officer Stander's office where he and Panic are first introduced. Stander asks Panic if he speaks Afrikaans, Panic says he does not. Flashback to Panic's house the morning after they go partying, Panic and Pat part after bickering over him not having a job. Pat leaves and Panic is approached by Ma Mobise about paying his rent. She then lectures him about rising rent prices and how nothing is ever done in Soweto. Her son Sam (Eugene Majola) listens on. Pat in the meantime arrives for work. She is a housemaid to a white South African woman, Joyce (Margaret Michaels). Panic arrives, asking Pat for money. Joyce sends him away.

Back in prison, all of the cells are full. Panic is being interrogated by Stander, who is outlining his extensive criminal history. On the last page, he leans back and notes, "I see you've been working for us." In another flashback, Panic is trailing an obviously rich woman on the street, eyeing her handbag. But before he has a chance, another man grabs it from her. Panic runs after him. He meets up with Dingaan and Pat in a bar, and recounts that he tripped up the thief and the woman rewarded him. The thief is in fact at the bar and confronts Panic. He is angry about Panic getting out of jail on an earlier occasion, accusing him of selling out to the authorities. Panic breaks a bottle and threatens to kill him. The other man runs. A white officer comes into Panic's cell and accuses all the men there of being terrorists. Panic is then taken to Stander's office, where Stander demands, "What do these communists want?"

Back in Soweto, Panic steals a suit and dons it. He goes to Joyce's house to see Pat. Pat sends him away in anger. He refuses to leave. Joyce arrives and demands him to leave. He refuses. Joyce gets her dog and threatens Panic. He backs away from the house. Leaving, he picks up a brick and throws it through Joyce's window. In Stander's office, the police officer offers Panic coffee and food. He demands information from him about a man named Duma (Peter Sephima). Panic says he does not know him. Upon returning to his cell, he is accused by a fellow inmate of selling out to the authorities. Through another flashback, we find out that Pat has been fired. Sam takes Pat to a local gathering of the African National Congress, where the locals demand for the mayor (Steven Moloi) to keep from raising rents. Duma first appears, speaking out against the mayor and the current order.

The next morning, Ma Mobise wakes up a hung over Panic and demands he pay rent. He begrudgingly obliges. Ma Mobise then runs into her son, Sam, on the street. After she tells him to stay out of trouble, Sam runs from an approaching police van. Pat, meanwhile, meets with Duma, who urges her to return to Joyce and demand payment for benefits she was denied and the last week's wages. Pat goes to Joyce's, but is rebuffed by her former employer. Panic and Dingaan are in a mall. They spot a rich target and try to once again pull the trick they did earlier in the film. The man resists, grabbing the both of them. Panic stabs him and the two escape to a movie theater. Dingaan tells Panic he wants nothing more to do with him and leaves him. Panic in vain tries to get Pat back by going to her aunt's house. But he is sent away once again.

Back in Stander's office, Panic is standing nearly naked in front of the inspector. Stander and another officer nearly throw him out the window as an intimidation tactic. In another cut scene, we see Panic at a local healer's, she tells him that, "…the past and future are for dreaming about. The present is for living in." We see Pat meet up with Duma. They go to his office, but the police are searching it. They escape. There is a funeral in Soweto which the police attempt to stop. They take away Sam before fleeing the riotous crowd. Panic comes home and discusses this with Ma Mobise, she says he isn't at the police station. He then goes out looking for Sam. He ends up finding out that Sam has been hanging out with Duma, who is in hiding. Knowing Lucky is his brother, Panic goes to Lucky's. He gets nowhere, even after threatening him. Panic leaves, as two detectives are staking out Lucky's house.

Back at the police station, Panic is being humiliated by Stander, crouching naked in a locker room after insisting he does not know Duma. In another flashback, Panic is at Lucky's at night. He finds out Duma is there. Duma runs but Panic catches up with him and demands he leave Pat alone. The detectives staking out Lucky's place chase them but do not catch them. In his office, Stander places something in front of Panic and demands he sign it. Panic refuses. Stander shows him a recording of a riot. Through a quick series of flashbacks, we realize that this is a riot protesting Sam's death. Ma Mobise runs in front of the crowd and screams for justice. She is shot and the riot turns into a brawl. Panic and Duma flee but are caught by soldiers. Panic fights them and Duma escapes. In the final scene we see that the papers Stander demands Panic sign are actually a confession that Panic was aiding Duma in terrorist activities. Panic looks into the camera and refuses to sign the confession.

== Cast ==
- Thomas Mogotlane as Panic
- Marcel Van Heerden as Stander
- Thembi Mtshali as Pat
- Dolly Rathebe as Ma Mobise
- Peter Sephuma as Duma
- Darlington Michaels as Dingaan
- Eugene Majola as Sam
- Gabriel Dichwabe as Crowd Leader
- Brad Morris as Riot Policeman
- Polite Dlamini as Prisoner
- Duma Nyembe as Prisoner
- Jerry Mokgoko as Policeman
- Similo Makhambi as Charge Office Sergeant
- Boitumelo Dijoe as Sergeant
- Arthur Molepo as Warder

== Music ==
The music in the film is provided by The Ouens, a South African musical group. The word "ouen" is a local term meaning streetwise men, those often concerned with the wellbeing of their community and not just themselves, setting them apart from amapantsula. Aside from the music heard in Lucky's disco club, the majority of the rest of the music is chanting in Zulu. Most of these songs are sung by the prisoners in the cells with Panic or during the riots.

== Themes ==
Mapantsula heavily criticizes apartheid, showing how many different black South Africans, some law-abiding citizens, others criminals, are unjustly affected by the institutionalized policy of racism. Panic both exploits the system and is still caught in it. The inevitability of the conflict around him forces Panic to make a decision between personal gain (by confessing Duma is a terrorist to the police and being released) and helping the larger social movement by staying silent about Duma's whereabouts. Even though Panic inadvertently helps the police, the very force he's always fought against, he refuses to continue being selfish after Sam's death and Ma Mobise being shot right in front of him.

The film's depiction of criminal life in the global post-colonial era is one of self-determination. There is no system of justice in Mapantsula, the authorities are instead more interested in the status quo than of true order in a democratic nation. The mayor of Soweto is not elected by the people he supposedly represents and is accused of pocketing the money he gets from raising the rents. This is an example of private indirect government.

The crime depicted in Mapantsula is common in South Africa, especially pre-apartheid. The pickpocketing Panic commits is common in South Africa and difficult for the police to investigate. His musings on robbing Joyce also represent the fact that the majority of thefts in South Africa occur out of opportunity and not vengeance or racial discrimination.

== Release ==
It premiered at the 1989 Toronto International film festival, and the 1989 Göteborg Film Festival.

Newly restored version of the film was shown at the 2023 African Diaspora Film Festival in New York.

The digitally restored version of the film also made its debut at the 2023 Berlin Film Festival.

It was also showcased at the 2023 Durban International Film Festival.

== Reception ==
On review aggregator website Rotten Tomatoes, Mapantsula has an approval rating of 100%, based on reviews from 5 critics.

The film won the One Future Prize at the 1989 Filmfest München.

It was also selected as one of the 2023 Berlinale Classics.

== See also ==
- List of submissions to the 62nd Academy Awards for Best Foreign Language Film
- List of South African submissions for the Academy Award for Best Foreign Language Film
