= Screenwise =

Acting school in Sydney, Australia

- Established: 2000
- Location: Surry Hills, New South Wales, Australia; 33.9158°S 151.2252°E
- Website: http://www.screenwise.com.au/

Screenwise is an Australian film and television school for actors based in Surry Hills, Sydney. The school, established in 2000 and using only Australian Film Institute Award winners as teachers, is overseen by actor Denise Roberts. According to The Canberra Times in 2010, Screenwise was considered one of Australia's leading film and television schools for actors.

== History ==
In 2000 in a church hall in Crows Nest, Sydney, actor and director Denise Roberts began giving private acting lessons to around eight students. That led to the 2002 opening of Screenwise, a working industry, film and television school located in Sydney to provide specialist, career-focused training in acting for film and television. Noting that she "opened it because there are a lot of students who learn all their stuff about stage, but put them in front of a camera and they're just too big," Roberts limited the teachers to AFI Award winners, including actors Victoria Longley, Tina Bursill, Henri Szeps, Simon Burke, Nico Lathouris, Lucy Bell, Patrick Dickson, David Field and Rowena Wallace, and directors Scott Hartford-Davis and Robert Klenner. Providing courses that devote enough time to film and television, the school is designed to meet the needs of actors looking to sustain a career in acting: "It started out because I didn't think there were enough courses that devoted enough time to film and television. Considering TV is generally an actor's bread and butter, theatre might be the ultimate, but you need television to sustain a career," rather than "spend an age unemployed" after drama school waiting to "work with really fine actors and directors."

In May 2003, Lauren Lillie, a model and actor who was Bartercard Miss Indy 2003 and featured in the top 20 sexiest women for both Inside Sport and Ralph magazines that same year, enrolled in acting classes at Screenwise. By August 2004, the school had become one of Sydney's most productive originators of young acting talent, including Ashleigh Cummings and Stef Dawson, and "chalked up an impressive list of TV and screen credits," including placing graduates in top-rating soap operas such as Neighbours, Home & Away and All Saints and a variety of television commercials. In February 2007, Screenwise Acting School graduate Israel Cannan landed a role in Newcastle, a 2008 Australian drama film set in the New South Wales city of Newcastle.

In May 2010, Screenwise supported the Dungog Film Festival, discovering new acting talent with the Screenwise Speed Auditions. In 2010, Screenwise became a Government accredited RTO offering the two-year full-time Diploma of Screen Acting amongst its many courses and is now considered Australia's leading film and television school for actors.

For the past five years, Screenwise has been the major sponsor for the Heath Ledger Scholarship in Los Angeles. Established in memory of Australian actor Heath Ledger, the prize has become an opportunity for emerging Australian actors aged between 18–35 years.

== Studios ==
Screenwise Studios are located at 84 - 86 Mary Street, Surry Hills. Screenwise consists of three working studios that facilitate a learning environment and studio hire. The studio is equipped with a Green Screen.

== Courses ==
=== Full-time ===
- 10065NAT Diploma of Screen Acting (RTO provider code 91699)

=== Part-time ===
- One-Year Part-Time Showreel Course

=== Short courses ===
- Screen Acting Beginners
- Screen Acting Intermediate
- Screen Acting Advanced
- American Accent
- Screenteens
- Master Intensives
- Presenting on Camera
- Corporate Classes

== Staff ==
- CEO & Director: Denise Roberts
- General Manager: Renee Currie
- Marketing Manager: Ashley Andres Penin

== Tutors ==
Notable past and present tutors include:

- Peter Andrikidis
- Rachael Blake
- Lisa Robertson
- Natalie Saleeba
- Jeremy Lindsay Taylor
- Robert Mammone
- Peter Kowitz
- John Jarratt
- Grant Bowler
- Alan Flower
- Kieran Darcy-Smith
- Marcus Graham
- Denise Roberts
- Matt Walker
- Roxane Wilson
- Patrick Phillips
- Simon Westaway
- Kriv Stenders
- Geoff Bennet

== Past students ==
Notable students from Screenwise include:

- Chris Hemsworth
- Tabrett Bethell
- Christian Clark
- Stef Dawson
- Adam Demos
- Ed Kavalee
- Andy Whitfield
- Nathaniel Buzolic
- George Houvardas
- Todd Lasance
- Yvonne Strahovski
- Isabel Lucas
- Ashleigh Cummings
- Matt Levett
