= Nerve (2013 film) =

- Theatrical film poster
- Directed by: Sebastien Guy
- Screenplay by: Sebastien Guy; Sarah Smith
- Produced by: Neal Kingston
- Starring: Christian Clark; Georgina Haig; Craig Hall; Cameron Daddo; Andrea Demetriades; Denise Roberts; Sara Wiseman; Gary Sweet
- Cinematography: James L. Brown
- Edited by: Eric Seaburn; Laurence van Camp
- Music by: Ramesh Sathiah; Haydn Walker
- Distributed by: Cornerstone Pictures and Luscious International Pictures
- Release date: 12 June 2013
- Running time: 86 minutes
- Country: Australia
- Language: English

Nerve is a 2013 Australian psychological thriller film directed by Sebastien Guy. It stars Christian Clark and Georgina Haig.

== Plot ==
After suffering a breakdown due to the death of his wife in a car accident, Jakob Evans tries to find closure in confronting her lover. Helped by the lost and troubled Grace, Jakob's search transforms from finding closure to obsession and revenge. While forced to face his own failings, Grace realises all is not what it seems.

== Cast ==
- Christian Clark as Jakob Evans
- Georgina Haig as Grace
- Craig Hall as Vincent Gregory
- Gary Sweet as Ben Livingston
- Andrea Demetriades as Helen White
- Denise Roberts as Sally Livingston
- Cameron Daddo as Darren Anderson
- Sara Wiseman as Jennifer
- Silvia Colloca as Elena
- Christian Clark as Jakob Evans
- Paul Winchester as Dr. Stevens

== Soundtrack ==
Movie credits state, "All songs performed by Inga Liljeström", one of which is titled is "Wishing Bone Hands", which can be found on YouTube. She is an Australian vocalist and composer. There was much interest in a soundtrack of this 2013 movie, (not to be confused with the movie from 2016 by the same name), but no soundtrack has been forthcoming.

== Accolades ==
Award	Category	Subject	Result
ACS Award	Victoria & Tasmania Silver Award	James L. Brown	Won
International Filmmaker Festival of World Cinema, London	Best Supporting Actress	Denise Roberts	Nominated
International Filmmaker Festival of World Cinema, London	Best Director	Sebastien Guy	Nominated
International Filmmaker Festival of World Cinema, London	Best Film	Sebastien Guy, Neal Kingston & Andrew Morris	Nominated
International Filmmaker Festival of World Cinema, London	Best Producer of a Feature Film	Sebastien Guy, Neal Kingston & Andrew Morris	Nominated
International Filmmaker Festival of World Cinema, London	Best Actor in Leading Role	Christian Clark	Nominated
