= Kadaicha =

Kadiacha
- Double feature DVD cover + Innocent Prey
- Directed by: James Bogle
- Written by: Ian Coughlan
- Produced by: David Hannay; Charles Hannah
- Starring: Zoe Carides; Tom Jennings; Eric Oldfield; Natalie McCurry; Steve Dodd
- Cinematography: Stephen F. Windon
- Edited by: Andrew Arestides
- Music by: Peter Westheimer
- Production company: David Hannay Productions
- Distributed by: CBS-Fox (video)
- Release date: 1988
- Running time: 88 minutes
- Country: Australia
- Language: English
- Budget: A$600,000 (est.)

Kadaicha (known Stones of Death in the U.S.) is a 1988 Australian horror film directed by James Bogle and produced by David Hannay. It was released on video.

== Plot ==
A series of unexplained of teenage murders occurs in an exclusive residential development. It is discovered that the development has been constructed on top of an old Aboriginal burial ground.

== Cast ==
- Zoe Carides as Gail Sorensen
- Eric Oldfield as Alex Sorensen
- Tom Jennings as Matt Taylor
- Natalie McCurry as Tracy Hocking
- Kerry McKay as Shane
- Fiona Gauntlett as Fizz Dryden
- Bruce Hughes as Tony Pirrello
- Steve Dodd as Billinudgel
- Deborah Kennedy as Mrs Millhouse
- Sean Scully as Mr Fitzgerald
- John Paramor as Detective Rose
- Nicholas Ryan as Franky Boland
- Rhoda Roberts as Lisa
- Sara Dakin as Deb Hartley
- Harry Cripps as Jeff Cross
- Terry Markwell as Gloria
- Nicholas Flanagan as Constable Todd
- Don Chapman as Sergeant Hanley
- Alan Lovell as Constable O’Bersky
- Anthony Ackroyd as Constable Pritchard

== Production ==
Kadaicha was directed by James Bogle, in his feature film debut, for producer David Hannay, who was producing low-budget commercial films at the time. There was an interest in Aboriginal themes during the late 1980s. It was the last of four low-budget films made by executive producer Tom Broadbridge and producer David Hannay for the video market, and produced via David Hannay Productions.

Charles Hannah co-produced the film, which was based on a screenplay by Ian Coughlan. Cinematography was by Stephen F. Windon, and Andrew Aristedes edited the film. The original score was composed by Peter Westheimer.

Kadaicha was filmed on location in Sydney, Australia, on a budget of an estimated A$600,000.

The title derives from the device used in the film, called "kadaicha stone". The word is a variant spelling of "kurdaitcha", which in the lore of some Aboriginal peoples in central Australia was a kind of magic man or evil being who killed people.

== Release ==
Some sources suggest that it was originally intended for cinematic release, but Kadaicha was released on video in 1988, in the United States under the title Stones of Death, and in the Netherlands as Death Stone – Kadaicha. Other European countries gave it similar titles in translation.

The film was distributed internationally by Broadstar Entertainment Corporation.

It was released on DVD in October 2017 by Umbrella Entertainment in Australia, and as part of a box set titled All the Haunts Be Ours: A Compendium of Folk Horror by Severin Films in 2021.

== Reception ==
The film received mixed reviews on its re-release. Kevin Bechaz gave it 3 out of 5 stars, calling it enjoyable for what it is – "genre cinema at its most obscure". Another reviewer called it "a forgettable teen horror flick", but liked its "message about the consequences of greed and self-interest, and how innocent lives can be lost as a result", and for its exposure of the "lack of respect for Aboriginal lore and sacred territory, the history of past conflicts between white colonialists and Aboriginal people. At least two reviewers noted its borrowing from the 1982 American horror film directed by Tobe Hooper, Poltergeist.
