= Challenger (1997 game show) =

- Genre: Game show
- Directed by: Greg Harper
- Presented by: Diarmid Heidenreich (1997); Adrian DeVito (1998); Zoe Sheridan (1998)
- Country of origin: Australia
- Original language: English
- No. of seasons: 2
- No. of episodes: 265

Production
- Executive producer: Simon Phillips
- Producer: Rani Stainton
- Production locations: Brisbane, Queensland
- Camera setup: Tom Volmer; Steve Atkinson; Jonathan Hastings; Andrew Bergh; Leslie R. Hicks
- Running time: 26 minutes

Original release
- Network: Nine Network
- Release: 10 February 1997 – 13 June 1998

Challenger was an Australian children's game show that aired on the Nine Network in 1997 and 1998. The first host was Diarmid Heidenreich, famous for playing Dougie the pizza delivery guy in Pizza Hut commercials in the mid-1990s. After he left the show in early 1998 he was replaced by hosts Adrian DeVito and Zoe Sheridan. They filmed 265 episodes before the show was superseded by the return of Now You See It.

== Format ==
Challenger had two teams (Alpha and Omega) with three children a side. The teams consisted of a captain and two other members.

=== Diarmid (1997) ===
In the first round the contestants each answered a question from categories chosen at random by hitting their buzzer. Each question was worth 5 points and there was an extra 20 points on offer if all three categories matched. The questions were divided into six categories, spanning a range of genres: Cosmix, Entertainment, Geography, Language, Nature and Sport. Cosmix consisted of questions from all five other categories, plus some extra questions. The first round did not have a name. After both teams had answered their questions, the winning team were allowed to decide who would undertake the physical challenges first.

In the second round the teams competed in a set of physical challenges in order to earn questions to answer. Questions would be worth points depending on the challenge, usually 10 points per answer, plus a bonus 20 points for earning and correctly answering all 6 questions available in a challenge. Each member of both teams participated in one challenge, however some challenges - such as Go Ballistic - required the other teammates to provide a supporting role in completing the challenges.

The final round was called Slime Time and found the team leaders in glass containers below a slime showerhead. One of their teammates would be blindfolded, whilst the other would have their hands tied around their back. The four teammates would them look through a blue vat of slime for a disc with a question in it. Whichever team got the disc had the choice to either answer the question themselves, or force the other team to answer the question. Should the answering team get their question right, they would get 50 points and the other team's captain would be slimed. If both teams were holding the disc simultaneously, the question wes read and anyone could buzz in to answer the question. If the answering team answered the question incorrectly, their opposing team would get 50 points and their team captain would be slimed. Occasionally, both captains were slimed. The lever to operate the slime (a mud-coloured liquid) was pulled by someone unseen. Sometimes a guest would be present in the show, such as the team's school principal or a teacher, and they would be slimed with one of the team captains.

Prizes for contestants included merchandise from the Australian Geographic retail outlets and occasionally, a Nintendo 64 gaming console.

=== Adrian & Zoe (1998) ===
The first round was called Mind Zone. The three categories were "It's a What?", "Pick Your Face" and "Position Yourself" and all consisted of "What/Who/Where Am I" questions. There was only one question asked in this round. Whichever team answered the question correctly did not win any points, but got to choose which team attempted the challenges first.

In the second round the teams completed the physical challenges, like it was during Diarmid's run. However, now every challenge had physical discs for the contestants to find (except for Go Ballistic), and each disc represented a question for the contestant to answer. Each correct answer is worth 10 points, and the questions are not separated into categories.

The final round was called Hyperflush, and functioned in the same way as before. The captains would be seated inside the tank, and their teammates would search the tank for a disc. The team who answered the question correctly (if any) would receive the bonus 50 points and Adrian would pull the lever to start a shower of coloured water for the losing captain, who would often make faces at the camera during his introduction in the segment.

Prizes for contestants would include CD-ROM encyclopedias and Walt Disney Records CDs.

== List of Challenges ==
The challenges in this show all had a physical element to them. Most involved collecting discs (or in the case of Go Ballistic, balls) to gain points by answering questions, while some involved merely connecting up pieces in order to earn points. During Diarmid's run, an explanation of each of the challenges was shown prior to the first team attempting each challenge. During Adrian and Zoe's run, the explanation was done after the Mind Zone round.

- Oblivion - People went through mazes with revolving door mirrors on them. One contestant who is not in the maze will need to communicate the contestant who is on the maze for directions. During Diarmid's run, the challenge was called "Get Lost" and the revolving doors were solid colours.
- Pro-Pole-sion - Contestants would swing on different coloured poles trying to grab discs that were stuck to the poles. These poles were suspended in the air and had a metal foothold on the bottom, making it difficult (but not impossible) for contestants to use both feet.
- The Sphere - The contestant was spun in an orb. Upon being released they had to pop red balloons to find discs. Some of the balloons also contained other substances such as flour. During Diarmid's run, this challenge was called "Cape Sphere".
- Vertically Challenged - Contestants would climb up a wall whilst trying to retrieve four discs on the way. At the top of the wall, they could search a UFO for further two discs. Keeping in with the theme of the show, the wall had a volcano effect painted over it. While some of the holes contained discs, others would contain shaving cream or flour. After the challenge was completed, the contestant would either go down by either the fireman's pole, or a ladder.
- Go Ballistic - One contestant would stand in a rocket with smoke whilst plastic balls were rained on them from above. Their teammates had six buckets of balls into a conveyor belt. Each bucket had one red ball. The contestant had to catch and place six red balls in a chute to complete the challenge.
- Big Squeeze - One contestant would wear a fat suit and run through an obstacle course to collect discs.
- Schwing It - This game consisted of an obstacle course involving the following elements: flying fox (over a smoke-filled pit), chain link bridge (over a yellow mat), monkey rings and a smoke filled pit. (some of the discs were hung ON the rings, requiring the contestant to hang one-handed while retrieving the disc) After the contestant completed the course, he/she was able to search the smoke pit (if there was time). During Diarmid's run, the challenge was called "Hang Loose" and one pit consisted of feathers, and the other bubbles.
- The Pipe Line - One contestant would be on top of a ladder and undo pipe pieces from the roof and the two remaining would try to attach the pipes to the holes in a series of vertically hanging pipes. After ten seconds, smoke would start pouring from the far-left, obstructing the contestant's view. No team has ever completed the pipeline as the best was done with four pipes attached.
- Rampage - One contestant is attached to a bungee line and they required to run forward up a half pipe to grab discs. Four of them are found on the ramp and two on the side wall.
- Blockage - All three contestants had to assemble a puzzle made up of blocks. A completed puzzle was shown to the contestants to help with the assembly of the puzzle. Contestants earn a question for every completed part of puzzle. This challenge was only performed during Diarmid's run because the categories are part of the puzzle. No team has ever completed the puzzle fully.
