= Tracks of Glory =

- English version DVD cover
- Genre: Mini-series
- Written by: Tony Morphett
- Directed by: Marcus Cole
- Starring: Phil Morris; Cameron Daddo; Richard Roxburgh; Nicholas Eadie; Justine Clarke
- Country of origin: Australia
- Original language: English
- No. of episodes: 2

Production
- Producers: Damien Parer; Paul Barron
- Running time: 2 x 90 mins
- Production companies: Barron Entertainment; Seven Network; Paragon Entertainment Corporation

Original release
- Network: Seven Network
- Release: 5 July – 6 July 1992

Tracks of Glory is a 1992 Australian mini series set in 1903 about Major Taylor's visit to Australia and his rivalry with Australian cyclist Don Walker.

The budget was around $5 million. The script was based on a book Major Taylor Down Under by Jim Fitzpatrick.

== Cast ==
- Phil Morris as Marshall W. 'Major' Taylor
- Cameron Daddo as Walker
- Richard Roxburgh as Hugh Mcintosh
- Nicholas Eadie as Floyd Macfarland
- Justine Clarke as Kate O'Brien
- Brett Climo as Jonathan Dodds
- Scott Burgess as Pat Galloway
- John Ewart as Syd Melville
- Robert Vaughan as Mr Morris
- John Clayton as Mr Campbell
- Edwin Hodgeman as Journalist 1
- Syd Brisbane as Larrakin
