= The Catch-Up =

- Genre: Talk show
- Created by: Mia Freedman
- Directed by: David Summons
- Starring: Libbi Gorr; Zoe Sheridan; Mary Moody; Lisa Oldfield
- Country of origin: Australia
- Original language: English
- No. of seasons: 1
- No. of episodes: 79

Production
- Production locations: Willoughby, Sydney, Australia
- Running time: 60 minutes (including commercials)

Original release
- Network: Nine Network
- Release: 26 February – 15 June 2007

The Catch-Up was an Australian daytime live television talk show that aired on the Nine Network in 2007. It was created by Mia Freedman.

The show, screened from Monday to Friday, featured an all-female panel of co-hosts. These included Libbi Gorr, Zoe Sheridan, Mary Moody and Lisa Oldfield. It premiered on 26 February 2007 and was produced at Channel Nine's studio in Willoughby.

The show's concept was to showcase women discussing views, news and gossip with each other and with their guests. The programme followed a similar format to The View.

The show was under pressure even before it began. The Nine Network's decision to cancel its broadcast of the US soap opera The Young and the Restless after 33 years in order to make way for the program caused outrage amongst fans of the soap opera, which had aired on the Nine Network since 1974.

== Cancellation ==
Due to low ratings, the show was cancelled on 13 June 2007, with the final episode airing on 15 June.
