= Happy Hunting (film) =

- Theatrical release poster
- Happy Hunting
- Directed by: Joe Dietsch; Louie Gibson
- Written by: Joe Dietsch; Louie Gibson
- Produced by: Bryson Pintard; Jeff Kalligheri
- Starring: Martin Dingle-Wall; Ken Lally; Kenny Wormald; Connor Williams; Gary Sturm
- Cinematography: Joe Dietsch
- Edited by: Joe Dietsch; Louie Gibson
- Music by: Rhyan D'Errico; Simon Jay
- Production companies: Waterstone Entertainment; Selective Collective
- Distributed by: Vertical Entertainment
- Release dates: October 21, 2016 (Screamfeast); September 22, 2017
- Running time: 91 minutes
- Country: United States
- Language: English

Happy Hunting is a 2016 American western horror film written, directed, and edited by Joe Dietsch and Louie Gibson.

== Plot ==
Warren, an alcoholic drifter, learns from a phone call that an ex-girlfriend has died and he has a son in Mexico. Warren writes down the caller's number before travelling to sell Bo Dawg and his associate methamphetamine. Bo Dawg's associate accidentally shoots himself. Warren shoots Bo Dawg dead and flees, pursued by Cal and Robbie.

Warren, after failed attempts to contact the caller, stops at Bedford Flats, an isolated town deep in the American desert near the Mexican border. Warren meets the local liquor store owner Don and local drunk Bob, who is warned that the town is sick of his behavior. Warren attends a sobriety meeting held by Steve Patterson. After the meeting, Steve offers to help Warren become sober. Returning to his motel room, Warren discovers Cal and Robbie have tracked him down. Warren seeks shelter with Steve and his wife Cheryl. Warren takes a horse tranquilizer he finds planted in Steve and Cheryl's bathroom to ease his withdrawal and passes out.

When he awakens, Warren is tied up in the middle of the desert along with Cal, Robbie, Bob and another man, Jim. Sheriff Burnside ignores Bob's pleading and announces the town's annual hunt, where armed townsfolk will hunt and kill the captives. Burnside introduce the hunters, including Steve and Cheryl, Don, and a trio of siblings, Charley, Jessie, and Mickey Wakowski. Burnside frees the captives, who flee through the desert. After a few miles of running, Jim falls over in exhaustion. Warren leaves him the rest of the tranquilizers to ease his suffering. After running several miles further, Bob says he knows what they must do to survive. He knocks Cal unconscious with a rock, forcing Warren and Robbie to flee in different directions. Soon after, the hunters set off to find the men. The Wakowski siblings shoot Jim with an arrow and run him over with a car. When they reach Bob and Cal, Bob attempts to exchange Cal for his survival. Don kills both Cal and Bob with a long range rifle.

Steve and Cheryl ambush Warren, attempting to hit him with their car. Steve accidentally crashes, knocking himself unconscious and killing Cheryl. Warren grabs a gun and a map from the car. When Don arrives, he flees. As night falls, Warren succumbs to his alcohol withdrawal and hallucinates. After bumping into Robbie, the pair discover a service hut, and Warren filters ethanol out of various supplies. Warren contacts a man on a radio and requests help; however, it is revealed to be the Wakowskis. They shoot Robbie through a window, killing him instantly. When the Wakowskis enter the hut, Warren shoots Charley with an arrow through the neck, shoots Mickey multiple times with a gun, and kills Jessie with an axe.

Continuing his hike through the desert, Warren finds a group of Mexicans sneaking into the US and realizes they are tying red ribbons as they go. Warren steps on a bear trap, rendering him immobile. Don catches up to Warren and stabs him, but Warren shoots Don dead. Meanwhile, Steve awakens in Bedford Flats, taken back to receive medical help. Upon learning that Cheryl has died, Steve becomes enraged, murders a townsperson and leaves to locate Warren. Burnside and his son, Junior, set out to help Steve. Burnside explains to Junior that Steve was once a captive in the hunt but escaped, bettered his life, and became sober. Despite Burnside's belief that Steve is a changed man, Steve shoots Junior through the head and beats Burnside to death with a baseball bat.

At night, Warren hallucinates Bo Dawg urging him to take his own life. Warren refuses and frees himself from the bear trap. At the American–Mexican border, he discovers a red ribbon leading to an underground passageway. While traveling through it, Steve attacks Warren. Warren eventually sets Steve on fire with a lighter and a bottle of tequila. Warren reaches the Mexican side of the tunnel and checks his phone for service. As he gets service, he is suddenly shot through the neck by a Mexican gang member. As the gang approach Warren, he laughs.

== Cast ==
- Martin Dingle-Wall as Warren Novack
- Ken Lally as Steve Patterson
- Kenny Wormald as Junior
- Connor Williams as Robbie
- Gary Sturm as Sheriff Burnside
- C.J. Baker as Don
- Jeremy Lawson as Bo Dawg
- Michael Tipps as Charley Wakowski
- Liesel Hanson as Jessie Wakowski
- Kenneth Billings as Mickey Wakowski
- Frederick Lawrence as Cal
- Chuck Ramage as Bob
- Sherry Leigh as Cheryl
- Norman De Buck as Jim

== Filming ==
Filming of Happy Hunting took place over 23 days throughout various locations in the California desert, most notably Bombay Beach, CA. The production crew was limited to writer/director Joe Dietsch and Louie Gibson, producer Bryson Pintard, co-producer Joe Toronto, makeup artist Michelle Sfarzo, and production coordinator Ben Guppy. Extras for the film were local residents of Bombay Beach, California.

The film was shot digitally using the Canon C100 mk2 camera with 10-bit external recording.

The film was edited in Adobe Premiere. To save costs on offline/online editing, the film only had a single online edit and all color was done in Premiere.

== Release ==
On October 21, 2016, Happy Hunting had its world premiere at Screamfest in Hollywood. The film has a limited theatrical release in the United States by Vertical Entertainment starting on September 22, 2017.

Happy Hunting had its streaming debut on Netflix

As of September, 2025 Happy Hunting is available on Amazon Prime.

== Music ==
The film score for Happy Hunting was originally written and composed by Rhyan D'Errico and Simon Jay using a live orchestra. Additional music was written by Ben Bostick.

== Reception ==
Rotten Tomatoes, a review aggregator, reports that 100% of 10 surveyed critics gave the film a positive review, with an average rating of 7.1/10.
