= Mary Moody =

Australian author

Mary Moody is an Australian author who trained as a journalist at The Australian Women's Weekly and was a long time presenter on Gardening Australia. She has written more than forty gardening books and five memoirs – Au Revoir (2001), Last Tango in Toulouse (2003), The Long Hot Summer (2005), Sweet Surrender (2010) and The Accidental Tour Guide (2019).

She also appeared as a panelist on the chat show The Catch-Up on the Nine Network in 2007.

Moody lived in the rural hamlet of Yetholme, near Bathurst from 2000 to 2016. Following the death of her husband David she moved to an extended family home in Blackheath where she holds Open Garden weekends and continues her writing. Moody also leads cultural, botanical and gourmet walking tours in the Himalayas, Mongolia, Morocco and France.

Moody has a French house in the town of Frayssinet-le-Gelat and it was her experiences there that prompted her to write her first memoir Au Revoir (2001). Moody has written four further memoirs Last Tango in Toulouse (2003), The Long Hot Summer (2005), Sweet Surrender (2010) and The Accidental Tour Guide (2019) which discuss her life, family and travels as well as Lunch with Madame Murat (2005) which she turned into a documentary film by the same name for SBS television.

== Personal life ==
Moody was married to film producer David Hannay, (23 June 1939 – 31 March 2014). They had three children together (Miriam, Aaron and Ethan) in addition to the son (Antony) that David produced with his first wife (Kathleen). Mary has eleven grandchildren - eight boys and three girls.

== Works ==
=== Cooking ===
1. The Long Table: My Love Affair with Food (2008)

=== Gardening ===
1. Vegetables, Herbs, and Fruits (1992)
2. Cottage Gardens (1993)
3. Plants for All Seasons (1994)
4. 100 Plants for Pots and Containers (1994)
5. 100 Plants for Easy to Maintain Gardens (1995)
6. 100 Plants for Shady Gardens (1995)
7. What Rose is That? (1995)
8. Rock and Alpine Gardens (1995)
9. The Encyclopedia of Flowers (1999)
10. The Gardener's Companion (2001)
11. Mary Moody's Roses (2006)
12. Kids in the Garden (2012)

=== Memoirs ===
1. Au Revoir:Running Away from Home at Fifty (2001)
2. Last Tango in Toulouse (2003)
3. The Long Hot Summer: A French Heat Wave and a Marriage Meltdown (2005)
4. Sweet Surrender: Love, Life and the Whole Damn Thing (2010)
5. The Accidental Tour Guide (2019)

=== Travel ===
1. Lunch with Madame Murat: Food of Love in a French Village (2005)
