= Joanne Priest =

Australian actress

- Occupation: Actress
- Years active: 2006-

Joanne Priest is an Australian actress. For her performance in Love Is a Four Letter Word she was nominated for the 2001 Australian Film Institute Award for Best Performance by an Actress in a Guest Role in a Television Drama Series.

Primarily a stage actress her roles include Pizza Man at the Stables Theatre in Darlinghurst, NSW, Alchemy - Journey of a Wild Woman at the Bondi Spice Gallery in North Bondi, NSW and Lobby Hero at the Ensemble Theatre Connie and Kevin and the Secret Life of Groceries at the Belvoir Downstairs, Sydney, NSW.
