= Late Nite Catechism =

1993 comedy stage play

- Original language: English
- Written by: Vicki Quade and Maripat Donovan
- Characters: Sister
- Genre: Comedy

Premiere
- Date: May 1993
- Place: Live Bait Theater; Chicago, Illinois
- Official website

Late Nite Catechism (1993) is a solo comedy play about a fictional Catholic nun, written by Vicki Quade and Maripat Donovan. The show itself is a form of participatory theatre where the actress playing the nun is the only person on stage, and members of the audience become members of the nun's school class.

Funds from the play help to support retired nuns in need. The authors discovered that when Social Security was implemented in the United States, the Catholic Church opted out for nuns. This has since changed and social security is in place. However, the raising of funds for the local monastery is always offered to each presenting organization. If the offering is taken at the end of the performance, the actresses encourage everyone in the audience to give generously. As of December 2012, the Late Nite Catechism franchise had collected over two million dollars for retired Sisters.

Donovan originated the role of Sister. For her work in Late Nite Catechism, she was nominated for the Outer Critics Circle Award in New York for outstanding solo performance. She was also nominated for two Los Angeles Drama Critic Circle Awards for writing and performance, and won the LADCC for Best Solo Performance in 1999.

Quade wrote the original 60-page draft in three weeks, and over time the authors revised the material. Quade produced the show in Chicago, and in 2000, was nominated for a Los Angeles Drama Circle Critics Award.

Late Nite Catechism is currently produced by the New York-based company Entertainment Events, Inc. They took over the aspect of production in 1999.

== Legal issues ==
In 2011 Entertainment Events, Inc. prevailed in arbitration proceedings with Quade. The company claimed breach of contract and copyright infringement, over a 1995 licensing agreement. Under the ruling, Vicki Quade is not permitted to produce Late Nite Catechism or her sequels outside of her Chicago territory - a 50-mile radius. This prohibition applies even if the character in the sequels is called "Mother Superior." In addition the arbitrator has awarded Entertainment Events, Inc. with damages sought.
