= Martin Dingle-Wall =

Australian actor, producer and screenwriter

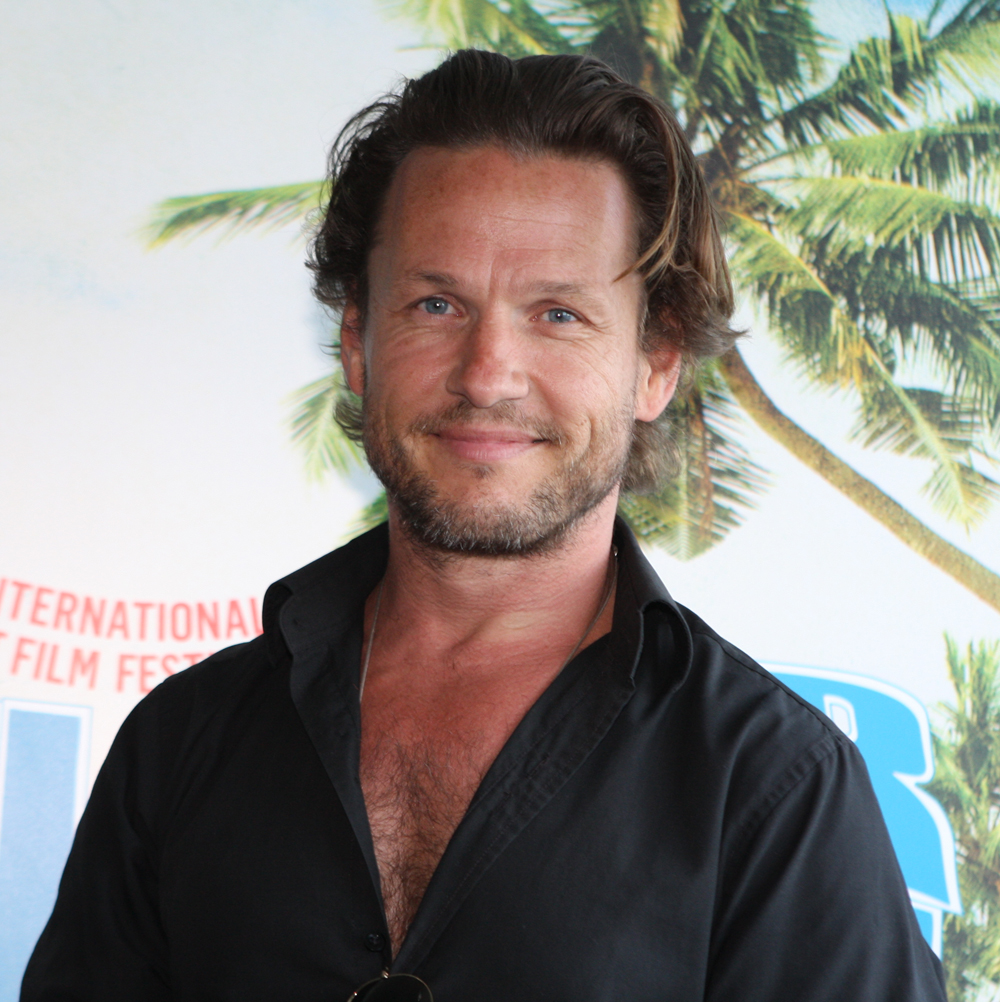
- Born: Martin Dingle-Wall; Bondi Beach, Sydney, Australia
- Occupations: Actor; producer; screenwriter
- Years active: 1998–present
- Notable work: Flynn Saunders in Home and Away
- Website: martindinglewall.com

Martin Dingle-Wall is an Australian actor, producer and screenwriter. He originated the role of Flynn Saunders on the Australian soap opera Home and Away in 2001. He departed the show in 2002. Dingle-Wall has appeared in Satisfaction, Underbelly: A Tale of Two Cities and Cops: L.A.C.

== Career ==
For his portrayal of Flynn Saunders in Home and Away, Dingle-Wall received a nomination for the Logie Award for Most Popular New Male Talent.

In 2003, he appeared on stage as Kip Polson in an adaptation of the screenplay The Nothing Men. He was picked for the Peugeot 307 SV campaign in 2004. Later in 2004, he took a part in a short movie for the BBC, Out of Water, playing the lead.

In 2005, appeared as Scott Allen in the television drama film Summer Solstice, directed by Giles Foster, playing alongside Jacqueline Bisset, Honor Blackman, Jason Durr and Sinéad Cusack.

In 2007, he appeared as Johnny Lake in and episode of the television series Satisfaction.

In 2007–2008, he also filmed the comedy feature film The Makeover, playing the lead Roger Keaton.

He has also written two screenplays: Heart of a Nation and Pariah; both were taken up by an (unnamed) production house in the UK with Shepperton and Pinewood Studios.

In 2007–2008, he also filmed the movie version of The Nothing Men for which he was also a producer through his company Alchemy Film Productions P/L., via which they became a global industry headline for pioneering the revolutionary RED digital cinema camera in the Southern Hemisphere, second in the world to only Steven Soderbergh's Che.

In 2008–2009, he was cast as the younger brother Les Kane of the notorious Kane Brother's, bosses of the Painters & Dockers for the Underbelly prequel Underbelly: A Tale of Two Cities.

In 2010, he appeared alongside Kate Ritchie for a third time in Cops: L.A.C.

Dingle-Wall went to Los Angeles in 2012 to play the title role of Matthew Butticker, Defense Attorney in the Award Winning play ANACONDA for the Hollywood Fringe Festival. It went on to win the Festival & be nominated as Top 10 Theatre Productions that year by the GLAAD Awards.

He relocated to Los Angeles in 2013 & booked a major commercial campaign for NISSAN cast as the Hero by Director Joseph Kosinski (Oblivion, TRON-LEGACY).

Dingle-Wall booked the support role of Neil McPherson in the film Strangerland with Nicole Kidman and Joseph Fiennes, directed by Kim Farrant.

Soon after, he booked the romantic lead in the Feature Film "All that Jam" shot on location in Russia, for which he learned Russian and played almost the entire film in that language. His support cast included Chris Owen, (Sherminator from the American Pie Franchise) and Svetlana Khodchenkova (Viper from Wolverine).

Dingle-Wall then booked the lead role in Happy Hunting, shot in America in the Californian desert, Directed by Joe Dietsch & Louie Gibson. It had its American Premier at Screamfest where it won BEST CINEMATOGRAPHY. It is heavily engaged in the 2017 Festival Circuit both domestically and abroad.

He joined the cast of Salty, alongside Antonio Banderas and Olga Kurylenko in July 2016.

In 2021, Dingle-Wall played the lead role of Will Scott in the Egyptian-American TV series, Cypher.

== Personal life ==
He has a brother and sister, Jamie & Sally. Dingle-Wall grew up on the coast of Bondi.

In October 2016, Dingle-Wall revealed that shortly after relocating to Los Angeles in 2012, he began receiving treatment from Alcoholics Anonymous. The actor told Jonathon Moran of The Daily Telegraph that he decided to attend AA because he did not like the personality changes he suffered as a result of consuming alcohol.

== Filmography ==
=== Film ===
Year	Title	Role	Notes
2009	The Makeover	Rodger Keaton	
2010	The Nothing Men	Wesley Timms	Also producer
2010	Twenty Ten		
2015	Strangerland	Neil McPherson	
2016	All That Jam	Michael	
2016	Happy Hunting	Warren Novak	
2017	Gun Shy	Clive Muggleton	
2020	The Will	Henry	
2020	Swimming for Gold	Calvin Carpenter	
2020	The American King	Street Preacher	
2020	The Dry	Luke Hadler	
2022	The American King-As told by an African Priestess	Professor	
2023	Kane	Richard	
TBA	This Bloody Country	Ned Campbell	Post-production

=== Television ===
Year	Title	Role	Notes
1998	All Saints	Greg Howard	Episode: "Give and Take"
1998	All Saints	Mick	Episode: "Family Feud"
1998	Murder Call	Drug Dealer	Episode: "A View to a Kill"
1999	Big Sky	Gavin	Episode: "Shadow Chasers"
2001	Jumping Ship	Dante	TV film
2001–2002	Home and Away	Flynn Saunders	Seasons 14–15 (main cast)
2007	Satisfaction	Johnny	Episode: "Mrs. Hyde"
2009	Underbelly	Les Kane	Season 2: "A Tale of Two Cities" (4 episodes)
2009	Rescue: Special Ops	Jake Hudson	4 episodes
2010	Cops LAC	Rhys Llewellyn	13 episodes
2014	Hush: The Series	Will Kalig	TV pilot
2016	Upper Middle Bogan	Evan	4 episodes
2017	Visioneering: Forward Thinkers of the World	Bruno	
2020	Boned	Billy Nordic	Episode: "One"
2021	Cypher	Will	7 episodes
2021	Eden	David Cohen	Episode: "Andy"
2022	Love and Penguins	Mackenzie	TV film

=== Radio ===
Year	Title	Role	Notes
2012	The Truth	Judge 2	Podcast series; "Domestic Violins"
