= Going Sane =

1987 Australian comedy film

- Directed by: Michael Robertson
- Written by: John Sandford
- Produced by: Tom Jeffrey
- Starring: John Waters; Linda Cropper; Judy Morris
- Cinematography: Dean Semler
- Edited by: Brian Kavanagh
- Production company: Sea Change Films
- Release date: 30 July 1987
- Running time: 89 mins
- Country: Australia
- Language: English
- Budget: A$2.1 million

Going Sane is a 1987 Australian comedy starring John Waters. It was one of several films made in the 1980s where Waters plays a character who has a mid life crisis. In 1994 when asked to name his worst movie, Waters said Going Sane was the one "that failed to achieve its brief more than any other."

== Cast ==
- John Waters as Martin Brown
- Linda Cropper as Irene Carter
- Judy Morris as Ainslee Brown
- Frank Wilson as Sir Colin Grant
- Kate Raison as Nosh
- Brett Climo as Matthew Brown
- Maggie Blinco as Miss Griffiths
- Denise Roberts as Mrs Chubb
- Rob Steele as Sergeant

== Production ==
Filming started 15 July 1985.
