= List of Australian films of 1993 =

List of Australian films of 1993 contains a detailed list of films created in Australia in 1993.

== 1993 ==
Title	Director	Cast	Genre	Notes
Alex	Megan Simpson Huberman	Lauren Jackson, Chris Haywood,	Drama / Sport	
Australia: The Great White Shark	Liz Wight	Guy Blackmore	Documentary	
Bad Boy Bubby	Rolf de Heer	Nicholas Hope	Comedy / Drama	
Bedevil	Tracey Moffatt	Lex Marinos, Tracey Moffatt	Horror	Screened at the 1993 Cannes Film Festival
Black River	Kevin Lucas	Russell Page, John Pringle	Short	
Blackfellas	James Ricketson	John Moore, David Ngoombujarra, Jaylene Riley, John Hargreaves	Drama	aka: "Day of the Dog"
Body Melt	Philip Brophy	Gerard Kennedy, Andrew Daddo	Horror	
Boys' Shorts: The New Queer Cinema	Mark Christopher, Stephen Cummins		Comedy / Drama	
Breathing Under Water	Susan Murphy Dermody	Anne-Louise Lambert, Kristoffer Greaves, Maeve Dermody	Drama	
Broken Highway	Laurie McInnes	Aden Young, David Field, Bill Hunter	Drama	Entered into the 1993 Cannes Film Festival
Crimestoppers	David Rechtman	Aidan Fennessy, Craig Taylor	Short	
Crimetime	Marc Gracie	Marcus Graham, Bruce Venables, Lucy Bell		
The Custodian	John Dingwall	Anthony LaPaglia, Hugo Weaving, Barry Otto	Drama	
Dinosaur	Sarah Watt		Animation / Short	
The Door	Josie Keys	Barry Otto	Short / Drama	
Eight Ball	Ray Argall	Matthew Fargher, Paul Stevn, Lucy Sheehan	Drama	
Encounters	Murray Fahey	Kate Raison, Martin Sacks, Martin Vaughan	Drama	aka: "Voyage into Fear"
Everybody's Business	Mal Read		Documentary	
Fatal Past	Clive Fleury, Richard Ryan	Costas Mandylor, Katarzyna Figura, Terence Cooper	Drama / Thriller	
Frauds	Stephan Elliott	Phil Collins, Josephine Byrnes, Hugo Weaving	Comedy / Thriller	Entered into the 1993 Cannes Film Festival
Get Away, Get Away	Murray Fahey	Murray Fahey, Annie Davies, Ned Manning	Comedy	
Gino	Jackie McKimmie	Nicholas Bufalo, Zoe Carides, Bruno Lawrence	Drama	
God's Bones	Samantha Lang	Olivia Pigeot, Brian Vriends, Ritchie Singer	Short	
Going Down Under			Adult	
Gross Misconduct	George T. Miller	Jimmy Smits, Naomi Watts, Sarah Chadwick	Thriller / Drama	
Hammers Over the Anvil	Ann Turner	Charlotte Rampling, Russell Crowe	Biography / Drama	
The Heartbreak Kid	Michael Jenkins	Claudia Karvan, Alex Dimitriades,	Drama	
Hercules Returns	David Parker	David Argue, Michael Carman, Bruce Spence	Comedy	
The Hero	James Mairata	David Berman, Breanna Bushell, Bruce Denny	Short	
The Huntsman	Brent Houghton	David Will No, Nathan Hill, Ola Chan	Short	
Justified Action	Rene Nagy Jr.	Don Swayze, Peter Phelps	Drama	
Just Desserts	Monica Pellizzari	Nicoletta Boris, Lynette Curran, David Field	Short	
Kin chan no Cinema Jack	James Bogle, Kin'ichi Hagimoto	Jôji Abe, Maggie Cheung, Kin'ichi Hagimoto	Comedy	
Love in Limbo	David Elfick	Craig Adams, Aden Young, Russell Crowe	Comedy	
Map of the Human Heart	Vincent Ward	Jason Scott Lee, Anne Parillaud, Patrick Bergin	Drama	Screened at the 1992 Cannes Film Festival
Memories and Dreams	Lynn-Maree Milburn	Alexandra Chapman, Johanna Kimla Ocenaskova, Jeremy Stanford	Short	
Mr. Electric	Stuart McDonald	Ernie Dingo, Leverne McDonnell, Daryl Pellizzer	Short	
No Worries	David Elfick	Geoff Morrell (actor), Susan Lyons	Drama	
The Nostradamus Kid	Bob Ellis	Noah Taylor, Miranda Otto	Drama	
One Ten: Two Forty	Brian Bleak	Jeff Booth, Tom Carroll, Ross Clarke-Jones	Documentary	
The Piano	Jane Campion	Holly Hunter, Harvey Keitel, Sam Neill, Anna Paquin	Drama	Entered into the 1993 Cannes Film Festival
Reckless Kelly	Yahoo Serious	Yahoo Serious, Melora Hardin, Alexei Sayle, Hugo Weaving	Comedy	
Sacred Sex	Cynthia Connop	Alan Lowen, Annie Sprinkle	Documentary	
Say a Little Prayer	Richard Lowenstein	Sudi de Winter, Fiona Ruttelle, Rebecca Smart, Lynne Murphy, Jill Forster	Drama	
Seething Night	Douglas Brook	Michael Carman, Craig Goddard, Steve Hardman	Short	
Shotgun Wedding	Paul Harmon	Aden Young, Zoe Carides, John Walton	Crime	
Silent Number	Jamie Blanks	John Brumpton, Bronwyn Jones, Jason Mill	Short	
The Silver Brumby	John Tatoulis	Russell Crowe, Caroline Goodall	Drama	
This Won't Hurt a Bit	Chris Kennedy	Greig Pickhaver, Jacqueline McKenzie, Maggie King	Comedy	
The Web: Bandicoot	Sarah Watt		Short animation	
The Web: Falcon	Lucinda Clutterbuck		Short animation	
The Web: Frogs	Sarah Watt, Lucinda Clutterbuck		Short animation	
The Web: Panda	Sarah Watt		Short animation	
The Web: Rattlesnake	Sarah Watt, Lucinda Clutterbuck		Short animation	
The Web: Seal	Sarah Watt		Short animation	
The Web: Shark	Lucinda Clutterbuck		Short animation	
Wide Sargasso Sea	John Duigan	Karina Lombard, Nathaniel Parker, Rachel Ward, Michael York	Drama	
You and Me and Uncle Bob	Alister Smart	Brooke Anderson, David Kaff, Martin Vaughan	Comedy	
You Can't Push the River	Leslie Oliver	Nollaig O'Flannabhra, Antonio Punturiero, Kathryn Chalker	Drama	

== See also ==
- 1993 in Australia
- 1993 in Australian television
