= Lisa Armytage =

English actress

- Born: Somerset, England
- Occupations: Actress; voice artist
- Years active: 1979–present
- Children: 2

Lisa Armytage is an English actress, known for her roles in Australian film and television. After moving to Australia, Armytage appeared in Cop Shop for three months as the girlfriend of Constable Tony Benjamin (Gregory Ross). She guested in Prisoner and starred in the ABC radio play Footmarks in the Sand. In 1986, Armytage co-starred in her first Australian feature film Cool Change as cattle farm owner Joanna Regan. She had to learn to ride a horse and muster cattle for the role. She then appeared in the Nine Network miniseries The Lancaster Miller Affair as Anne Lancaster. From 1987 until 1989, Armytage played Dr Beverly Marshall in the Australian soap opera Neighbours. Her character was introduced as a love interest for series regular Jim Robinson (Alan Dale). After leaving Neighbours, Armytage appeared in various stage productions and television dramas, including The Flying Doctors and The Miraculous Mellops. She returned to the UK in 2003, where she became a voice artist for commercials, audio dramas, and audio books. She joined the cast of audio soap Riverside in 2022, which is based on a series of stories originally published in The People's Friend.

== Early and personal life ==
Armytage was born in Somerset, England. She has three brothers and a sister. She trained at the Guildhall School of Music and Drama and had a season with the National Youth Theatre. She also appeared at the Bristol Old Vic.

Armytage met her husband-to-be, an Australian lawyer, during her last years of classes. They married after a nine week relationship and emigrated to Melbourne. They have two daughters. Armytage studied a Bachelor of Arts degree in Australia and had intentions of becoming a teacher.

== Career ==
Armytage admitted that it took time to find work after she and her husband moved to Australia in 1979. In 1981, she had a 12-week stint in Cop Shop as Jennifer Grant, the girlfriend of Constable Tony Benjamin (Gregory Ross). She also appeared in a production of Roger Pulvers' play The Covenant of the Rainbow at the La Mama Theatre. This was followed by an appearance in the ABC one-off drama On the Line and a guest role in an episode of Prisoner. In August 1984, Armytage starred in the ABC radio play Footmarks in the Sand, which was written by Danish actress and playwright Astrid Saalbach. Director John Hannaford believed Footmarks in the Sand should be recorded outside, and recording took place at Black Rock making it the first ABC radio play to be recorded on location for many years. Armytage plays Stella, who along with her boyfriend Paul, plans a trip to the beach, but their outing is filled with tension.

Armytage's big break came in 1986 with a co-starring role in her first Australian feature film Cool Change. She plays Joanna Regan, a cattle farm owner and love interest for Jon Blake's character. Armytage spent a week learning how to ride a horse and muster cattle for the role. Cool Change was filmed over six weeks in Mansfield at producer Geoff Burrowes' mountain property. Not long after she wrapped filming, Armytage began work on the Nine Network miniseries The Lancaster Miller Affair in which she plays the major role of Anne Lancaster, the wife of Bill Lancaster played by Nicholas Eadie.

After taking a break from acting to have her second child, in 1987 Armytage was cast as Dr Beverly Marshall in the soap opera Neighbours. She initially signed a 12-month contract. Beverly was introduced as a love interest for series regular Jim Robinson, following discussions between Alan Dale and the writers about the lack of romance in Jim's life. Armytage admitted that it was a difficult decision to sign on for 12 months and had not intended to take on a major role because of her young children, however, she felt she was able to combine the two and her situation was working well. She also admitted to being nervous about the recognition that came with the role, as Neighbours was one of Australia's most popular television shows at the time.

In October 1988, David Brown of TV Week reported that Armytage and Neighbours had "parted company", and she would be filming her final scenes in November. Brown confirmed that her character would not be written out and instead another actress was being sought for the role. Armytage later stated that she quit the show because she was spending too much time away from her family. She also said that she should have asked for a break or for her hours to be cut, but she was "a very 'all or nothing' person at the time" and resigned instead. In February 1990, Armytage accepted libel damages from the News of the World in the High Court after they published an article stating that she had been sacked from Neighbours because she was a bad actress. Her lawyer explained that she left the show due to an exhausting schedule and family commitments. News Group Newspapers Limited also issued an apology for publishing the allegation.

After leaving Neighbours, Armytage appeared in a production of Coralie Lansdowne Says No at The Playbox Theatre, alongside Ailsa Piper and future Neighbours cast member Terence Donovan. She also guested in numerous television dramas, including The Flying Doctors, The Miraculous Mellops and Police Rescue. Armytage returned to the UK in 2003. In addition to stage work, she has become a voice artist for various projects, including commercials, audio dramas, and audio books. She has worked with novelists Anna Jacobs, Alison Booth, and Cary J Hansson. Armytage appeared in the 2009 fantasy romance film Halfway to Heaven, which was created by James Sharpe to raise awareness and money for Broomhill Pool. In 2010, she appeared in Richard Stirling's No Expense Spared, a play about the MPs expenses scandal, at Jermyn Street Theatre.

In 2022, Armytage joined the cast of audio soap Riverside, which is based on a series of stories written by Glenda Young and originally published in The People's Friend. She won the Best Human Performance in an Audiobook (factual or fiction) accolade at the 2023 VOX Awards for her work narrating A Midlife Gamble by Cary J Hansson. She was also nominated for Best Human Performance in an Audio Drama / Podcast for Doctor Who spin-off The Robots.

== Filmography ==
Film performances
Year	Title	Role	Notes
1986	Cool Change	Joanna Regan	
2006	Rabbit Fever	Customs Lady	
2009	Halfway to Heaven	Joyce	
2021	Emily the Little Match Girl	Narrator	
2024	Meet Me by the Sea	Anna's Mum	Short film

Television performances
Year	Title	Role	Notes
1981	Cop Shop	Jennifer Grant	Recurring role
1982	On the Line		
1983	Prisoner	Clare Adams	Episode: #5.81
1986	The Lancaster Miller Affair	Anne Lancaster	Miniseries
1987–1989	Neighbours	Beverly Marshall	Series regular
1990	The Flying Doctors	Edna MacKay	Episode: "The Hero"
1991	The Miraculous Mellops	Jean Mellop	Episodes: #1.16, #1.20
1992	A Country Practice	Jane Lindsay	Episodes: "Wings (Parts 1 and 2)"
1992	Police Rescue	Librarian	Episode: "From This Day Forward"
1994	Sky Trackers	Trish Colman	Episode: "Origins"
1997	Heartbreak High	Librarian	Episode: #6.30
2001	All Saints	Bernice Lewis	Episode: "Chains of Love"
2023	The Crown	Berkshire WI Chair	Episode: "Ruritania"
