= Brian Kavanagh (filmmaker) =

Austrian filmmaker

- Born: 1935 (age 89–90)
- Occupations: Author; film editor; screenwriter; film producer; film director

Brian Kavanagh (born 1935) is an Australian author, editor, writer, producer, and director of films and documentaries. As a film editor, he is known for his collaborative works with Fred Schepisi and Murray Fahey. In 1986, he was honored with the Australia Film Institute Award for Best Achievement in Editing, for his work on Frog Dreaming. In 1997, he was awarded a lifetime membership of Australian Screen Editors.

== Filmography ==
=== As director/producer ===
- 1971: A City's Child
- 1980: Maybe This Time (as producer only)
- 1983: Double Deal (also as writer)
- 1986: Departure
- 1996: Flynn (original director)

=== As editor ===
- 1970: The Naked Bunyip
- 1973: Libido
- 1976: The Devil's Playground
- 1978: The Chant of Jimmie Blacksmith
- 1978: Long Weekend
- 1979: The Odd Angry Shot
- 1985: Frog Dreaming
- 1986: Going Sane
- 1993: Frauds
- 1993: Get Away, Get Away
- 1994: Encounters
- 1995: Sex Is a Four Letter Word
- 1998: Dags
- 2001: Cubbyhouse

== Honors and awards ==
- 1986: Australia Film Institute Award for Best Achievement in Editing – Frog Dreaming
- 1997: Australian Screen Editors – Lifetime Membership

== Published works ==
- Kavanagh, Brian (2005). Capable of Murder, Bewrite Books, 188 pages. ISBN 978-1905202102
- Kavanagh, Brian (2006). The Embroidered Corpse, Bewrite Books, 200 pages. ISBN 978-1905202362
- Kavanagh, Brian (2007). Bloody Ham, Bewrite Books, 180 pages. ISBN 978-1905202539
- Kavanagh, Brian (2010). A Canterbury Crime, Bewrite Books, 156 pages. ISBN 978-1906609450
