= Rose Against the Odds =

- Written by: John Dixon
- Directed by: John Dixon
- Starring: Paul Williams; Telly Savalas; Kris McQuade
- Country of origin: Australia
- Original language: English

Production
- Producers: Ross Close; Russell Kennedy
- Cinematography: David Connell
- Running time: 182 minutes
- Production company: Onset Productions
- Budget: A$5.25 million

Original release
- Release: 29 September – 30 September 1991

Rose Against the Odds is a 1991 two-part Australian miniseries written and directed by John Dixon. It chronicles the life of Australian Aboriginal boxer Lionel Rose.

== Production ==
The series was conceived in 1983 and financed by the Seven Network, Film Victoria and Australian Film Finance Corporation. It was filmed in Melbourne, Los Angeles and Japan.

== Cast ==
- Paul Williams as Lionel Rose
- Tony Barry as Jack Rennie
- Kris McQuade as Shirley Rennie
- Steve Jacobs as Frank Oakes
- Telly Savalas as George Parnassus
- Tsurutarô Kataoka as Fighting Harada
- Vikki Blanche as Jenny Oakes
- Frankie J. Holden as Tom Price
- Rhonda Roberts as Gina Rose
- Lorraine Mafi-Williams as Adelaide Rose
- Alan Campbell as Young Lionel
- Jie Pitman as Young Michael
- David Wirrpanda as Young Ted
- Jacinta Stapleton as Young Jenny
- Tim Sullivan as Reporter
- Bob Ansett as Reg Ansett
- Tom E. Lewis as Koori #1
- John Brumpton as Drinker #2
