= John Dixon (filmmaker) =

Australian screenwriter and director

John Dixon (died 1999) was an Australian screenwriter and director best known for his association with Geoff Burrowes.

== Career ==
Dixon served in the Australian army as a translator with the occupying forces in Japan. He returned to Melbourne and obtained an Arts Degree at Melbourne University then travelled to London, where he trained as a film editor and worked for Technicolour and Elstree Studios. He moved back to Australia and worked for Channel 7 as a TV director on a number of shows. He started World of Sport with Ron Casey directing the first two hundred episodes. He moved to Channel Nine and directed a series of documentaries.

In 1963, he was one of the first Westerners allowed to film inside communist China, and made a documentary Red China.

Dixon formed Cambridge Films with some colleagues and made commercials for a number of companies. In 1967 he directed the TV commercial for VB Bitter which used a voice over by John Meillon and theme song from The Magnificent Seven which went on to become one of the longest running ads on Australian TV. He was also involved in the establishment of the Sunbury Pop Festival.

He had been writing a script about the Anzacs of World War I which he developed with Geoff Burrowes. This led to them making a number of films and mini-series together.

Dixon was a friend of Phillip Adams who described him as such:

All the years I knew him John talked about Australia with a passion that, sadly, sounds increasingly anachronistic. He was the sort of patriot that would eat a eucalypt. But he wasn't all that interested in multiculturalism, preferring to celebrate a multi-ethnic Australia where people would sign up for the local set of values which he saw as an amalgam of humour and high-mindedness, of democratic spirit and egalitarianism. Perhaps the sort of Australia that Paul Hogan celebrated before he lost his way in Los Angeles. There's a scene in The Goons where the famous Eccles arrives in London in the middle of summer, surrounded by his own personal snow storm, which enables him to drive his huskies through Trafalgar Square. John Dixon did that with his Australianness. While it wasn't conscious or calculated, wherever he went and whatever he was doing, he brought the whole Dorothea Mackellar, Banjo Paterson, Chips Rafferty, Henry Lawson package with him. I reckon that if he cut himself shaving, you'd have seen gum tree sap trickling from the cut.

== Select credits ==
- Consider Your Verdict (1961–63) (TV series) – director
- The Man from Snowy River (1982) – writer
- Anzacs (1985) (mini series) – writer, director
- Running from the Guns (1987) – director, writer
- The Man from Snowy River II (1988) – writer
- Rose Against the Odds (1991) (mini-series) – writer, director

=== Documentaries ===
- A Century of Responsible Government (1956)
- Red China Report (1965)
- On the Wool Track (1966)
- Indonesia after Sukarno
- Korea
- Who Defends Australia? (1966)
- Days of Destiny (1967) – about the Six-Day War
- Australians in Vietnam (1968)
- Israel: State Under Siege (1970)
- Muggeridge in Australia
- David becomes Goliath
- Sunbury (1972)
- A Toast to Melbourne (1981)
- Shrine (1981)

=== Unmade films ===
- Kokoda (1994)
