= Ingrid Mason =

Australian actress

- Born: June 1952 (age 74); Bougainville Island, Territory of Papua and New Guinea
- Education: National Institute of Dramatic Art (NIDA) (1973)
- Occupation: Actor
- Known for: The Sullivans
- Notable work: Break of Day (1976)
- Father: Paul Mason

Ingrid Mason is an Australian actress, known for her role in drama series The Sullivans.

== Early life ==
Mason, studied at Sydney's National Institute of Dramatic Art (NIDA), graduating in 1973.

== Career ==
Mason had a long running television role in long-running Crawford Productions period drama series The Sullivans.

Director Peter Weir originally cast Mason in the lead role of Miranda in 1975 mystery drama film Picnic at Hanging Rock, but realised after several weeks of rehearsals that it was "not working" and replaced her with Anne-Louise Lambert. Mason was persuaded to remain in the production as the minor character of Rosamund, by producer Patricia Lovell.

Mason was nominated for the 1977 AFI Award for Best Actress in a Supporting Role for her performance in the film Break of Day.

== Filmography ==
=== Film ===
| Title | Year | Role | Type | Ref |
|---|---|---|---|---|
| 1975 | Picnic at Hanging Rock | Rosamund | Feature film | |
| 1976 | Eliza Fraser | Mrs. Otter | Feature film | |
| 1976 | Break of Day | Beth | Feature film | |
| 2000 | Walk the Talk | Kidz Club Assistant | Feature film | |
| 2001 | Cubbyhouse | Ailsa McChristie | Feature film | |

=== Television ===
| Title | Year | Role | Type | Ref |
|---|---|---|---|---|
| 1975 | Paradise | Support role | TV film | |
| 1976 | Homicide | Guest roles: Kim Clayton / Alison Dewhurst | 2 episodes | |
| 1976 | Number 96 | Recurring role: Mandy Ward | 14 episodes | |
| 1976–1977 | The Sullivans | Regular role: Anna Kauffman | 116 episodes | |
| 1977 | The Death Train | Support role: Vera | TV film | |
| 1977 | Shimmering Light | Support role: Emily Stuart | TV film | |
| 1977 | Glenview High | Guest role: Penny Wilson | Episode 3: "Quiet Nights And Silent Deaths" | |
| 1978 | Graham Kennedy's Blankety Blanks | Panelist | | |
| 1996 | The Thorn Birds: The Missing Years | Support role: The Mother | Miniseries, 1 episode | |
| 1996–1997 | The Wayne Manifesto | Regular role: Mrs. Pringle | 6 episodes | |
| 2007 | Mortified | Recurring role: Miss Harvey | 3 episodes | |
