= Shane Briant =

British actor (1946–2021)

- Born: 17 August 1946; London, England
- Died: 26 May 2021 (aged 74)
- Occupation: Actor
- Spouse: Wendy Lycett

Shane Briant (17 August 1946 – 26 May 2021) was an English actor and novelist. Briant studied law at Trinity College Dublin but became a professional actor playing the lead in Hamlet at the Eblana Theatre, Dublin. Briant is best known for his roles in four Hammer Films productions; Demons of the Mind, Straight on Till Morning, Captain Kronos - Vampire Hunter, and Frankenstein and the Monster from Hell. He lived in Sydney, Australia with his wife Wendy (née Lycett).

== Stage and screen ==
Briant was nominated for the 'Best Newcomer' award by the London theatre critics when he played one of the leads in Children of the Wolf, with Sheelagh Cullen and Yvonne Mitchell at London's Apollo Theatre. Put under contract at Elstree Film Studios in late 1973, Briant starred in four films for Hammer; Straight On till Morning, Frankenstein and the Monster from Hell, Captain Kronos - Vampire Hunter and Demons of the Mind. He also appeared in television series such as Van der Valk, The Sweeney, and Jack Gold's The Naked Civil Servant with John Hurt. During this time Briant appeared in many BBC drama series and Plays of the Month, most notably Warris Hussein's Notorious Woman opposite Rosemary Harris, George Chakiris, and Jeremy Irons. In 1973, in Hollywood, he played the title role in Glenn Jordan's The Picture of Dorian Gray a two part Movie of the Week for America's ABC network. Other later film and television credits include John Huston's The Mackintosh Man with Paul Newman; guest starring in Jeffrey Bloom's Veronica Clare; playing Jack Palance's son in the film Hawk the Slayer; starring in David Wolper's Murder is Easy with Olivia de Havilland; and Just Jaekin's Lady Chatterley's Lover. According to Filmink, "he specialised in beautiful, androgynous, tormented young men."

Since the early 1980s, much of Briant's acting work was in Australian and New Zealand films and television. He starred in 14 films in Australia and New Zealand, including Simon Wincer's The Lighthorsemen, Shaker Run, Chamelian 3, Grievous Bodily Harm, Run, Chrissie, Run! and Cassandra. His TV credits include: Anzacs, The Flying Doctors, Bodysurfer, Darlings of the Gods, The Man from Snowy River, Wildside, Mission: Impossible, Murder Call, the European co-production Mission Top Secret, All Saints, False Witness, and the American sci-fi series Farscape and Time Trax. Briant portrayed the governor of Bombay in Roland Joffé's epic drama Singularity.

== Writing and art ==
Briant had seven novels published in Australia and one in the United States. In Australia, The Webber Agenda (1994), The Chasen Catalyst (1995), Hitkids (1999), Bite of the Lotus (2001) and Graphic (2005) Worst Nightmares and The Dreamhealer, and in the United States Worst Nightmares. His American released novel, Worst Nightmares was published in hardback by Vanguard Press in 2009; a mass market edition was published in 2010. Shane finished the sequel on 3 March 2011, The Dreamhealer. His latest novel, Live Feed, an indictment of the electronic media couched within the framework of a thriller, was released on Amazon.com and Createspace.com in July 2015. He had written an autobiography titled Always the Bad Guy which is only available online at Amazon.

The first short film he wrote, A Message from Fallujah won the "Best of the Fest" award at the 2005 Los Angeles International Short Film Festival and was in the final mix of ten shorts for consideration for an Academy Award that year.

He had an exhibition of his art work at the Ensemble Theatre in Sydney.

== Filmography ==
Year	Title	Role	Notes
1971	Von Richthofen and Brown	German Pilot	
1972	Straight On till Morning	Peter Clive	
1972	Demons of the Mind	Emil	
1973	The Picture of Dorian Gray	Dorian Gray	TV movie
1973	The Mackintosh Man	Cox	
1974	Captain Kronos - Vampire Hunter	Paul Durward	
1974	Frankenstein and the Monster from Hell	Simon	
1975	The Naked Civil Servant	Norma	TV movie
1980	Hawk the Slayer	Drogo	
1981	Lady Chatterley's Lover	Sir Clifford Chatterley	Film
1984	Run, Chrissie, Run!	Terrier	Film
1984	Constance	Simon Malyon	Film
1985	Shaker Run	Paul Thoreau	
1986	Comrades	Lieutenant Mann	Film
1987	Cassandra	Stephen	Film
1987	The Lighthorsemen	Reichert	Film
1987	Nancy Wake	Gestapo Major	TV miniseries
1988	Grievous Bodily Harm	Stephen Enderby	Film
1988	Barracuda	Zoli Scoane	TV movie
1989	Out of the Body	Paul Mitz	Film
1989	Outback	Allenby	Film
1991	Till There Was You	Rex	Film
1995	Tunnel Vision	Inspector Bosey	Film
2003	Subterano	Cunningham	
2003	Liquid Bridge	Carl Sinclair	
2008	The Children of Huang Shi	Roger Appsley	Feature film
2013	Serangoon Road	Major Lawrence Miller	TV series, 7 episodes
2013	The Lovers	Governor Hornby	Film
2015	Gallipoli	Sir Frederick Stopford	TV miniseries
2019	Sherlock Holmes vs. Frankenstein	Simon Helder	
