= Sex Is a Four Letter Word =

Sex is a Four Letter Word
- Directed by: Murray Fahey
- Written by: Murray Fahey
- Produced by: Murray Fahey
- Starring: Joy Smithers; Miranda Otto; Mark Lee; Tessa Humphries; Rhett Walton
- Edited by: Brian Kavanagh
- Production company: Coventry Films
- Release date: 1995
- Running time: 90 mins
- Country: Australia
- Language: English
- Budget: <A$1 million

Sex is a Four Letter Word is a 1995 Australian film directed by Murray Fahey and starring Joy Smithers, Miranda Otto, Mark Lee, Tessa Humphries and Rhett Walton.

It has been described as an Australian version of The Big Chill (1983).

== Premise ==
A love columnist, Sylvia, invites six friends over to talk about love and sex. They include her partner Morris, and her best friend Tracy, who is having an affair with Morris. There is also fashion designer Viv who turns up with her boyfriend Tom, who has a history with John, and Dan, who knows Tracy.

== Cast ==
- Joy Smithers as Sylvia
- Miranda Otto as Viv
- Mark Lee as John
- Tessa Humphries as Tracy
- Rhett Walton as Morris
- Timothy Jones as Tom
- Jonathon Sammy-Lee as Dan

== Reception ==
David Stratton in Variety called it "a familiar but entertaining and well-acted comedy-drama... diverting, low-scale entertainment, thanks mainly to the excellent performances, with the women especially good. "
