= Cassandra (film) =

- DVD cover
- Directed by: Colin Eggleston
- Written by: Colin Eggleston; Chris Fitchett; John Ruane
- Produced by: Trevor Lucas
- Starring: Shane Briant; Briony Behets; Kit Taylor; Lee James; Tessa Humphries
- Cinematography: Garry Wapshott
- Edited by: Josephine Cook
- Music by: Trevor Lucas; Ian Mason
- Production company: Parallel Films
- Distributed by: Virgin (video)
- Release date: 1987
- Running time: 89 minutes
- Country: Australia
- Language: English
- Budget: A$1,480,000

Cassandra is a 1987 Australian horror film directed by Colin Eggleston.

== Plot ==
Cassandra is a young woman who has been experiencing nightmares where she sees a woman commit suicide at the command of a demonic little boy, after which the house is set ablaze. As the dreams continue Cassandra becomes convinced that the boy is her long lost twin brother and that the dreams must be a result of suppressed memories from her childhood. Her parents, Stephen and Helen, swear that this is not the case, however Cassandra begins to suspect that they are lying when she discovers a photo of the woman, who is her father's sister Jill, who committed suicide. When she goes to question her photographer father at the family beach house, Cassandra discovers that he has been cheating on her mother with one of his models.

Distraught, Cassandra seeks solace with her boyfriend Robert and later experiences a vision of the model being murdered. This dream turns out to be true and Cassandra is suspected of being the killer. The killer later murders Stephen and starts to terrorize Helen. This causes Helen to confess to the police that Cassandra did have a twin brother, Warren, but he was institutionalized after Jill's death. Furthermore, while Warren was in hospital for a long time, Helen believes that he has been released and that the deaths are him seeking revenge. She also states that she is not Cassandra's mother, but rather her paternal aunt. Her true mother is Jill, as she and Stephen had been having an incestuous relationship with one another, leading to her getting pregnant with the twins. Helen and Stephen began living as a married couple after a traumatized Cassandra began calling Helen 'mother' after Jill's death.

After the reveal, Cassandra returns to the old family home where Jill died. She meets Robert, who reveals that he is actually Warren. He killed their parents because he saw their incest as an evil that their father perpetuated with Helen - and that he must kill both Helen and Cassandra to ensure that the cycle will never repeat. Cassandra manages to escape and shoot Robert/Warren, after which she sets him and the house on fire to make sure that he and the family taint ends forever. It is at this moment that she shares a psychic connection with her brother, revealing that while some of the nightmares were echoes of the past, the nightmare about fire was a prophecy that is now being fulfilled. The film ends with Cassandra attempting to resume a normal life, however it is implied that this may be impossible as Warren appears in her bedroom mirror, which shatters as he reaches out to her.

== Cast ==
- Tessa Humphries as Jill / Cassandra
- Tegan Charles as young Cassandra
- Lee James as Warren / Robert
- Dylan O'Neill as young Warren
- Shane Briant as Stephen
- Briony Behets as Helen
- Kit Taylor as Harrison

== Release ==
Cassandra was released straight to home video in Australia through Virgin Vision on 1 February 1987 and received a DVD release through Umbrella Entertainment on 23 January 2006.

== Reception ==
John Kenneth Muir rated the film at two and a half stars, stating that it was a "notch or two above average" while also criticizing the film's pacing. In his book Australian Gothic, Jonathan Rayner noted that Cassandra took some visual and story cues from films such as Halloween, Carrie, and The Shining. He would go on to discuss the film in an article about the Australian gothic genre, noting it and the films Raven's Gate and Bad Boy Bubby, as an example of how incest "recurs alarmingly in the gothic gothic as the defining flaw of the Australian family."
