= Slippery Slide =

- Directed by: Donald Crombie
- Starring: Jon Blake; Simon Burke; Gerry Duggan; John Waters; Arkie Whiteley
- Country of origin: Australia

Production
- Producer: Damien Parer
- Running time: 49 minutes
- Production company: Tasmanian Film Corporation

Original release
- Network: Nine Network
- Release: 1980

Slippery Slide is a 1980 Australian television film Donald Crombie and starring Jon Blake, Simon Burke, Gerry Duggan, John Waters, and Arkie Whiteley.

== Premise ==
An examination of the relevant life experience of a boy and his sister who have gone through the "welfare" system as neglected children, been given to foster parents, and eventually, through a series of incidents, end up in gaol.

== Cast ==
- Jon Blake as Chris Newsbury
- Simon Burke as Steve
- Gerry Duggan
- John Waters as David
- Arkie Whiteley
