= Shimmering Light =

- Written by: George Kirgo; Paul Savage
- Directed by: Don Chaffey
- Starring: Beau Bridges; Lloyd Bridges; Victoria Shaw; Ingrid Mason; Wendy Playfair; Mark Hembrow; Patrick Ward; John Meillon
- Music by: Fever (songs) & Frank Cook (Composer)
- Country of origin: Australia
- Original language: English

Production
- Producer: Frank Arnold
- Cinematography: Julian Penney
- Editor: Don Saunders
- Running time: 90 mins
- Production company: Transatlantic Enterprises
- Budget: $5 Million (Australia) $3.5 Million (USA) £2.5 Million (UK)

Original release
- Network: ABC
- Release: 12 December 1978

Shimmering Light is a 1978 Australian television film about an American surfer who travels to Australia in search of the perfect wave. It was one of six TV movies made in Australia by Transatlantic Enterprises. It was directed by Don Chaffey.

== Plot ==
Kevin Pearse is a 29-year-old drop-out who lives off his family trust and spends most of his time surfing. He is seeing two women, young Emily and older Moira. His father Scan arrives.

== Cast ==
- Beau Bridges as Kevin Pearse
- Lloyd Bridges as Sean Pearse
- Ingrid Mason as Emily Stuart
- Victoria Shaw as Moira
- Mark Hembrow as Peter
- Wendy Playfair as Gwen Stuart
- John Meillon as Eric Stuart
- Patrick Ward as Bruce McBride
- Mark Edwards
- Tim Simpson (actor) as Bryan

== Release ==
This telefilm was originally aired by ABC on 12 December 1978. It released in theatres at Germany on 17 May 1979 and later aired by BBC One and HBO on 13 February 1980. This telefilm was also aired by BBC Two and Cinemax from 18 June 1981 to 1 July 1981. It reran on The Movie Channel from 9 November 1981 to 23 April 1983. In Portugal, RTP1 and RTP2 aired the telefilm in May 1983. In Spain, TVE1 and TVE2 aired the telefilm in May 1983. In Netherlands, NPO 1 aired the telefilm in October 1982. In Italy, RAI aired the telefilm in October 1983.

On 23 September 1985, Academy Home Entertainment released the film as Mutual Respect on VHS. On 15 March 1988, Video Treasures also released the film on VHS.

== Reception ==
The Sydney Morning Herald wrote "The end product is really half-hearted. The idea was good, the acting similar. But, in the end, the Bridges family and their fellow actors were betrayed by a really ordinary script." Another reviewer in the same paper called it "a first rate telemovie." The Age's Mark Lawrence wrote "With its occasional tense moments, all round competent acting performances and good photography Shimmerling (sic) Light offers worthwile entertainment." Also in the Age Brian Courtis said "It's a lightweight film with a credible script and several excellent acting performances".
