= Roland Shaw =

British musician (1920–2012)

- Born: Roland Edgar Shaw-Tomkins; 26 May 1920; Leicester, England
- Died: 11 May 2012 (aged 91)
- Genres: Traditional pop
- Occupations: Composer, conductor
- Years active: 1940s–1990s
- Label: Decca

Roland Shaw (born Roland Edgar Shaw-Tomkins; 26 May 1920 – 11 May 2012) was an English composer, musical arranger, and orchestra leader.

Shaw was born in Leicester and attended the Trinity College of Music. He served in the Royal Air Force in World War II, leading RAF No 1 Band of the Middle East Forces. Following wartime service he arranged music for Ted Heath, Mantovani and many others.

The popularity of Shaw's arrangements of James Bond themes led to More Themes from the James Bond Thrillers for the release of Thunderball with tracks from both albums released on a 1965 UK album called James Bond in Action. In 1966, his orchestra released a compilation entitled Themes for Secret Agents. In 1967 Themes from the James Bond Thrillers Vol.3 (released in the UK as More James Bond in Action) followed the release of Casino Royale and You Only Live Twice.

Shaw came back in 1971 with a double album The Return of James Bond in Diamonds Are Forever (released as a single album in the UK as The Phase 4 World of Spy Thrillers) for the release of Sean Connery's return as Bond in Diamonds Are Forever. Shaw recruited guitarist Vic Flick to repeat his guitar playing on the "Gypsy Camp" track.

Shaw arranged the music in several films, and composed the scores for The Secret of My Success (1965) and Straight on Till Morning (1972).
