= Paul Dawber =

Australian actor

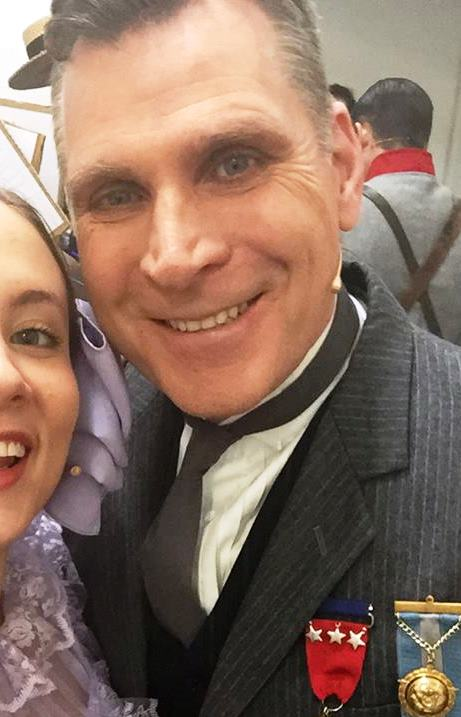
- Paul Dawber in 2014
- Born: Liverpool, England
- Occupation: Actor

Paul Dawber is a British born-Australian stage, film and television actor. He attended drama school at National Theatre, Melbourne and graduated in 1987. That same year, he played the role of Todd Buckley in Sons and Daughters. He has appeared in Australian police dramas such as Blue Heelers, Stingers, City Homicide, and Satisfaction. Dawber has also made appearances in Prisoner, and The Flying Doctors. He has played the recurring roles of Mr. Denning, Kim Howard, and Harry Sinclair in the soap opera Neighbours. Dawber has appeared in a dozen feature films, including the lead role in The Novelist in 2017. In 2019, he toured Australia, New Zealand and Germany with the Opera Australia production of West Side Story in the role of Lt. Schrank.

== Filmography ==
=== Film ===
Year	Title	Role	Notes
1988	A Cry in the Dark	Journalist	Uncredited
1998	Black Box	Nigel Blake	
1999	Erskinville Kings	Father	
2006	The Secret	Mathematician	Documentary
2007	Double Cross	Jacob	Short film
2010	Why Must the Show Go On?	Desmond Darke	Short film
2010	After	Detective 1	Short film
2011	Karen	Jack	Short film
2012	Underground: The Julian Assange Story	Citibank Spokesperson	
2014	I Remember the Future	Jack Burns	Short film
2014	Forbidden	Giles	Short film
2014	Paper Planes	Australian Cup Commentator	
2015	The Haircut	Sam	Short film
2016	Mui Karaoke: The Trial and Execution of a Goddess and Her Son	John	
2016	The Forgotten Children	Thom	Short film
2017	Serving Joy	Graham	Short film
2017	The Novelist	Lewis	
2017	Preach	Father	Short film
2017	La Souffrance	Marcel	Voice Role
2018	The Bounty of Thomas Reeves	Sam Wilkenny	Short film
2018	In Love with Ally Barker	Richard	
2018	Ruel: Younger	Ruel's Dad	Music Video
2018	Unspoken	Johnny's Father	Short film
2018	You Scratched My Car	Paul	Short film
2019	Masked	Frank (Dad)	Short film
2019	Quanta	Darryl	
2019	A Little New York Drama	Mitch	Short film
2020	Chinatown Cannon 2	Anthony	
2021	Night Shift	Officer Buddy	
2021	Incident Report	Damien Williams	Short film
2021	Aperture	Harvey Stevens	
2023	Wanda & Sully	Mr. Hester	

=== Television ===
Year	Title	Role	Notes
1983	Carson's Law	Constable Downard	
1984	Five Mile Creek	Corporal	
1984 - 1985	Special Squad	Special Operative Johnson	
1985	Zoo Family	John Davis	
1984 - 1986	Prisoner	Lester Marshall	
1986	Sword of Honour	Military Lawyer	TV Miniseries
1986	Prime Time	John Nolan	
1986	The Fast Lane	Detective George Monroe	
1986	The Lancaster Miller Affair	Carson's Associate	TV Miniseries
1987	Sons and Daughters	Todd Buckley	
1988	The Flying Doctors	Mr. Scott	
1989	The Power, The Passion	Noel Baker	
1989	Pugwall	X-Ray Technician	
1989	Inside Running	Johnny Lonigan	
1989	The Magistrate	Film Director	TV mini-series
1990	Mission Impossible	Male Nurse/Ronald	
1990	Col'n Carpenter	Davo	
1990	Bony	Detective Robert McLean	TV movie
1991	Chances	Peter	
1992	Phoenix	Snapper	
1992	Acropolis Now	Helmut	
1992	Bony	Estate Agent	
1997	State Coroner	Lazarvic	
1989 - 1998	Australia's Most Wanted	Detective Glen Davies	
2001	BackBerner	Various	
2002	Something in the Air	Damien	
2002	Short Cuts	Reporter	
1998 - 2004	Stingers	Dr. David Taylor/Doctor/Dr. Trentham/Roger Newstead	
2005	Scooter: Secret Agent	Mr. Sloan	
1997 - 2005	Blue Heelers	Alan Anderson/Barry Craig/Warren Jones	
2006	Abortion, Corruption and Cops: The Bertram Wainer Story	Jack Matthews	TV movie
2007	Bastard Boys	Claude	TV Miniseries
2007	City Homicide	Alex Zammit	
2009	Satisfaction	Hugh	
2009	Rush	David Lord	
2012	An Innocent Man?	Pontius Pilate	TV movie
2012	Dangerous Remedy	TV Interviewer	TV movie
2013	Please Like Me	Father Callahan	
2014	House Husbands	Matthew Graham	
2015	The Colour of Eden	Older Paul	TV movie
2015	Miss Fisher's Murder Mysteries	Tennis Official	
1990 - 2020	Neighbours	Mr Denning/Kim Howard/Harry Sinclair	
