= Justified Action =

- Directed by: Rene Nagy Jr.
- Written by: Elliott A. McGarva
- Starring: Don Swayze; Peter Phelps
- Production company: Westworld Film Productions
- Release date: 1993
- Running time: 90 mins
- Country: Australia
- Budget: $2.9 million

Justified Action is a 1993 Australian film about the head of international security for a corporation, who tracks down a Japanese businessman. The film features Don Swayze and Peter Phelps, and is directed by Rene Nagy Jr.

== Cast ==
- Don Swayze as Curtis Carter
- Peter Phelps as Eddie Carter
- Christine Ongley as Sarah Jordan
- Mark Hembrow as Richard Carter
- John Samaha as Vinny
- Summer Nicks as Wilton Lineker
- Richard Carter as Sam
- Michael Julian Knowles as Bennett

== Production ==
The film had a budget of $2.9 million and was filmed in January and February 1993. The film was produced by Westworld Film Productions with Jack Samardzisa as Executive Producer and Rene Nagy Jr. as Producer. The script was written by Elliot A. Mcgarva and the film was edited by Gary Woodyard. Kevan Lind was director of photography.
