= LoveStuck =

- Directed by: Murray Fahey
- Produced by: Dan Sanguineti; Murray Fahey
- Starring: Rik Brown
- Cinematography: Dan Sanguineti
- Production company: Sanguineti Media
- Distributed by: Magic Box Entertainment
- Release date: 24 August 2017
- Running time: 73 mins
- Country: Australia
- Language: English

LoveStuck is a 2017 Australian film directed by Murray Fahey who called it "the most ambitious project that I have ever undertaken".

== Premise ==
Josh discovers he is emotionally stuck between his ex-girlfriend Kate, his new girlfriend Cath and his best friend; and in the course of a day he must follow his passion and become unstuck.

== Cast ==
- Rik Brown as Josh
- Rama Nicolas as Kate
- Cathy Hagarty as Cath
- Patti Styles as Trish

== Production ==
The film was shot in 2013 in Canberra during Improvention, the international improvisers’ conference. It was improvised. "I wanted to tell a twist on the girl meets boy story, so I thought how about we start with boy meets old girlfriend and see what happens," said Fahey. "By the end of the first day I realised we had a romantic comedy in the making."

Rik Brown said, "There was a great sense of adventure making this film, everyone was coming together – in any moment they had spare – to keep adding to this ever-evolving story. All the improvisers in this film are wonderful. I am used to working with most of them on stage, so to transport that chemistry onto film was a real treat."

== Reception ==
Filmink felt the film "sets the bar impossibly high, and can’t help but fall a little flat" but "the resolution of the love story is genuinely touching because of its improvised nature" and "the technical execution is flawless – the ‘look’ and the ‘feel’ all work – it's a fair guess that LoveStuck has set a benchmark for where and how improvised cinema goes next."

Heavy magazine wrote "While an improvised movie sounds like it shouldn’t work this one does to the point where you really do care which decision Josh makes. Worth checking out if you like your cinema a little left of center."
