= Running from the Guns =

- Theatrical film poster
- Directed by: John Dixon
- Written by: John Dixon
- Produced by: Geoff Burrowes
- Starring: Jon Blake; Mark Hembrow; Nikki Coghill; Terence Donovan; Peter Whitford
- Cinematography: Keith Wagstaff
- Edited by: Ray Daley
- Music by: Bruce Rowland
- Production company: Burrowes Film Group
- Distributed by: Hoyts
- Release date: 1987
- Country: Australia
- Language: English
- Budget: A$6.6 million
- Box office: AU $72,356 (Australia)

Running from the Guns (originally known as Free Enterprise) is a 1987 Australian crime thriller film directed by John Dixon and starring Jon Blake, Mark Hembrow, Nikki Coghill, Terence Donovan, and Peter Whitford. It is a buddy action film set in Melbourne.

== Premise ==
Two friends, Dave and Peter, accidentally pick up the wrong truck at the docks, which contains contraband wanted by some criminals.

== Cast ==
- Jon Blake as Davie
- Mark Hembrow as Peter
- Terence Donovan as Bangles
- Nikki Coghill as Jill
- Peter Whitford as Terry
- Patrick Ward as Mulcahy
- Warwick Sims as Simon Martin
- Bill Kerr as Gilman
- Toni Lamond as Davie's Mum
- Simon Westaway as Motorcycle Cop
- Gus Mercurio as Chazza

== Production ==
Filming took place in late 1985.

== Reception ==
The film received poor reviews. The Age wrote Dixon "attempts in his new film an amoral, cynical and satirical style of action caper-comedy but never comes within co-ee of achieving it."

Filmink later wrote "there’s no reason films like this couldn’t have worked in Australia, this just wasn’t done that well."
