= The Lancaster Miller Affair =

1986 miniseries by Henri Safran

- Written by: Peter Yeldham
- Directed by: Henri Safran
- Starring: Kerry Mack; Nicholas Eadie
- Music by: Frank Strangio
- Country of origin: Australia
- Original language: English
- No. of episodes: 5

Production
- Producer: Paul Davies
- Cinematography: Ross Berryman
- Editor: Richard Hindley
- Running time: 300 minutes
- Budget: A$4,725,000 or $6 million

Original release
- Network: Nine Network
- Release: 6 July – 8 July 1986

The Lancaster Miller Affair is a 1986 Australian television miniseries that first aired on the Nine Network on 6 July 1986. The five hour-long episodes tell the story of the relationship between Bill Lancaster and Jessie Miller.

== Cast ==
- Kerry Mack as Jessica "Chubbie" Miller
- Nicholas Eadie as Bill Lancaster
- Malcolm Robertson as James Carson
- Wayne Cull as Haden Clarke
- Peter Kowitz as Maddox
- Barry Hill as Edward Lancaster
- June Salter as Maud Lancaster
- Lisa Armytage as Anne Lancaster
- John Lee as Charles Colby
- Maureen Edwards as Alice Burgess
- David Nettheim as Dr Tallman
- Gerard Maguire as Frank Upton
- John O'May as J.F. Russell
- Bud Tingwell as Sam Hayes
- Gus Mercurio as Harry Middleton
- Paul Dawber as Carson's Associate
- Peter Moon as Reporter #2

== Production ==
The mini series became notorious for a clash with Australia's Actors Equity. The lead male roles of Lancaster and his friend Hayden Clarke were offered to Sam Neill and John Hargreaves, who turned them down. The producers then tested a large number of actors but claimed none of them were suitable and cast non-Australians Peter Firth, Don Batte and Joseph Bottoms. Equity objected claiming the tests of the Australian actors rejected had not been properly carried out. Shooting was put back but eventually Australians Kerry Mack, Nicholas Eadie and Wayne Cull were cast.

The miniseries was filmed in and around Sydney and Melbourne. The shoot went for twelve weeks. $545,000 of the budget came from Film Victoria.
