= Straight On till Morning (film) =

1972 British film by Peter Collinson

- British theatrical release poster
- Directed by: Peter Collinson
- Written by: John Peacock
- Produced by: Michael Carreras
- Starring: Rita Tushingham; Shane Briant; James Bolam; Annie Ross; Tom Bell
- Cinematography: Brian Probyn
- Edited by: Alan Pattillo
- Music by: Roland Shaw
- Production company: Hammer Film Productions
- Distributed by: MGM-EMI Distributors
- Release date: 9 July 1972
- Running time: 96 minutes
- Country: United Kingdom
- Language: English

Straight On till Morning (also known as Victim and Dressed for Death) is a 1972 British thriller film directed by Peter Collinson and starring Rita Tushingham, Shane Briant, James Bolam, Katya Wyeth and John Clive. It was made by Hammer Film Productions. The screenplay concerns a reserved young woman who finds herself attracted to a handsome stranger, unaware of his psychotic tendencies.

== Plot ==
Brenda is a plain young woman, who lives at home with her mother in Liverpool and enjoys writing fairy tales for children. One day she tells her mother that she is leaving home and moving to London in order to find a father for her yet unborn baby.

Arriving in London, she has some of her belongings knocked out of her hands by an attractive young man (Peter) who doesn't give her a second look. She ends up living in a grubby bedsit before finding a job at a fashionable boutique (run by Jimmy Lindsay), and taking a spare room in a flat owned by one of her co-workers, Caroline, specifically as she hopes to meet a man at one of Caroline's many parties.

Peter appears to live with an older, alcoholic woman. He invites her upstairs, she goes into his room and, unseen, starts screaming.

After discovering Caroline in bed with Joey, another co-worker that she was interested in, Brenda runs crying out of the flat and onto the streets. She comes across a scruffy dog, and sees its owner looking for it. Recognising the young man who had previously bumped into her (Peter), she picks up the dog and runs home with it. Unbeknownst to her, Peter sees her do so.

Back at the flat, Brenda washes the dog, and pretties it up with a bow. She then uses the address on the dog's collar to take it back to Peter. He lets her in, and is nice to her, but upsets her when he insists she tell him why she took the dog. She finally admits that it was because she wanted to meet him, and have a baby with him. He suggests that she move in with him.

While she has gone to get her belongings, Peter kills his dog with a utility knife, ostensibly because it is now pretty. Brenda lies to Caroline, telling her that she is moving in with her mother who is ill.

After Brenda returns, Peter starts to buy her baby gifts. Meanwhile, Brenda's mother is worried about not hearing from her daughter, and calls her last known number, which is Caroline's flat. She then visits Caroline, before going to the police. Caroline looks through Brenda's old room and finds the dog's broken lead, which has Peter's address on it.

After Brenda has gone out shopping, Caroline arrives at Peter's house, and eventually they go to bed. Peter then murders her with the utility knife, again because she is too beautiful.

When Brenda returns, Peter is alone in the house (the implication being that Caroline has been buried in the garden). Brenda has had a total makeover – hair, clothes, make-up – in order to look beautiful for Peter. He makes it very clear that he loves her exactly the way she was. He tells a fairy story, which is interspersed with flashbacks implying that he has killed multiple women. Brenda and Peter go to bed.

A few days later Peter reads in the paper that there are missing person reports out on both Brenda and Caroline, and when he gets home he forbids Brenda to go out.

Brenda gives signs that she might now be pregnant, and they both seem happy. Peter tells Brenda he has a surprise for her and takes her up to his bedroom, where he plays her a tape of him killing the dog and Caroline. Brenda becomes hysterical and tries to get out of the flat but the doors are locked, as Peter walks after her, telling her he doesn't want to hurt her.

Later Peter sits alone in his house. There is no sign of Brenda.

== Cast ==
- Rita Tushingham as Brenda Thompson
- Shane Briant as Peter
- James Bolam as Joey
- Katya Wyeth as Caroline
- Annie Ross as Liza
- Tom Bell as Jimmy Lindsay
- Clare Kelly as Margo
- Harold Berens as Mr Harris
- John Clive as newsagent
- Lola Willard as customer

== Production ==
Finance came from EMI Films."

== Reception ==
The Monthly Film Bulletin wrote:

Anyone approaching I in the hope that Hammer's seasoned approach to the thriller may have had a steadying influence on Peter Collinson's directorial technique is in for a sad disappointment. From the sledgehammer irony of its opening in which a jungle of TV aerials is juxtaposed with Brenda's reading of a fairy story, to her final realisation that the Prince Charming of her dreams is a homicidal maniac, the film limps along like some nightmarish cross-breeding of A Taste of Honey [1961] and The Penthouse [1967]. There are even a few desultory echos of Peeping Tom [1960] (Peter's tapes of his victims) thrown in to give weight to the outrageous characterisations. Brenda, so naive that she fully expects to meet her dream lover on every corner, is a hard enough character to swallow, but the script finally abandons all claims to verisimilitude with the introduction of Peter, the beautiful and generous psychotic who lives in the complete isolation of a palatial mews house with the wealth of various murdered girlfriends stuffed in his kitchen drawer. From this point on practically nothing in the plot can be taken seriously, and it is constructed with a pretentious fragmentation whose only function seems to be to disguise the series of absurd coincidences on which the story depends. In her determination to make Brenda pathetic, Rita Tushingham overplays mawkishly, though Shane Briant manages considerably better in the almost impossible role of Peter, and at times even contrives to make the character credible.

The Radio Times Guide to Films gave the film 3/5 stars, writing: "This audacious blend of kitchen sink drama and psychosexual thriller represented an attempt by Hammer to revive the kinky brand of horror suspense that worked in their banner golden years. Rita Tushingham is the naive Liverpudlian who hooks up with gigolo Shane Briant, falls pregnant and discovers her dream lover is a serial killer. Directed by Peter Collinson in a similar vein to his other woman-in-terror flick Fright [1971], this is an effectively cold-hearted piece that goes for the easy shock."

Leonard Maltin's Movie Guide describes the film as an "offbeat thriller, but not terribly effective."

Leslie Halliwell describes the film as an "unattractive suspenser, wildly directed
