= The Lighthorsemen (film) =

1987 film by Simon Wincer

- Theatrical poster
- Directed by: Simon Wincer
- Written by: Ian Jones
- Produced by: Ian Jones; Simon Wincer
- Starring: Jon Blake; Peter Phelps; Tony Bonner; Bill Kerr; John Walton; Gary Sweet; Tim McKenzie; Sigrid Thornton; Anthony Andrews
- Cinematography: Dean Semler
- Edited by: Adrian Carr
- Music by: Mario Millo
- Production companies: RKO Pictures; FGH; Picture Show; International Film Management; Australian Film Commission; Film Victoria; South Australian Film Corporation
- Distributed by: Hoyts Distribution (Australia); Cinecom Pictures (US)
- Release dates: 10 September 1987 (Australia); 8 April 1988 (United States)
- Running time: 131 minutes
- Countries: Australia; United States
- Language: English
- Budget: A$10.49 million
- Box office: A$1.62 million (Australia)

The Lighthorsemen is a 1987 Australian war film about the men of a World War I light horse unit involved in Sinai and Palestine campaign's 1917 Battle of Beersheba. The film is based on a true story and most of the characters in the film were based on real people. (Elyne Mitchell wrote the novelisation based on the screenplay.)

It follows in the wake of other Australian New Wave war films such as Breaker Morant (1980), Gallipoli (1981), and the 5-part TV series Anzacs (1985). Recurring themes of these films include the Australian identity, such as mateship and larrikinism, the loss of innocence in war, and also the continued coming of age of the Australian nation and its soldiers (the Anzac spirit).

The film was directed by Simon Wincer, and several pieces of footage from the climactic scenes were re-used in the episode "Palestine, October 1917" of the television series The Young Indiana Jones Chronicles. This episode, which aired in 1993, likewise focuses on the Battle of Beersheeba, and was also directed by Wincer.

== Plot ==
In 1917, four World War I Australian cavalrymen – Frank, Scotty, Chiller, and Tas – serve in Palestine as part of the 4th Light Horse Brigade, a unit of the British and Commonwealth forces. When Frank dies, he is replaced by Dave. Dave finds himself unable to fire his weapon in combat and is transferred to the Medical Corps, where he will not need to carry a weapon, but will still be exposed to the fighting.

The British plan the capture of Beersheba. During an attack by Turkish cavalry, Major Richard Meinertzhagen deliberately leaves behind documents that indicate the attack on Beersheba will only be a diversion. The Australians leave for Beersheba with limited water and supplies. They bombard the town and the 4,000 Turkish-German defenders prepare for an assault. However, the German military advisor, Reichert, believes it is a diversionary attack and advises the Turkish commander that he does not need reinforcements. With time running out and water in short supply, British commanders suspect any attack upon Beersheba will probably fail. The Australian commanders ask the British to send in the Australian Light Horse. The British consent to what they think is a suicide mission.

On 31 October, the 4th and 12th Light Horse Regiments are ordered to attack the Turks. Dave and the rest of the medical detachment prepare for casualties and are ordered in behind the Light Horse. The Turks report the Australian mounted soldiers lining up to charge, but the officer in charge orders the Turks not to open fire until they dismount because he recognises they are light horse, riding for mobility but not trained or equipped for true cavalry combat.

The Australians advance on the Turkish positions and gradually speed up to a charge. The Turks realise too late that the soldiers are not dismounting and open fire. Artillery fire is sporadic and of limited effect, and the attack is so fast the Turkish infantry forget to adjust the sights on their rifles, which causes them to fire over the Australians' heads.

During the charge, Tas is killed by an artillery shell. The Australians advance faster than the Turkish artillery can correct its aim for the reduced range and reach the Turkish trenches. The Australians capture the first line of Turkish defenses. Scotty and a few others take control of the guns. Chiller is wounded in the trench fight. Dave is struck by a grenade and is seriously wounded while he protects Chiller. Scotty continues to fight on into the town.

When most of the remaining Turkish soldiers surrender, Reichert tries to destroy the wells but is captured by Scotty. The attack is judged a success, with the Australians sustaining only 31 dead and 36 wounded.

The successful attack on Beersheba allows for the subsequent capture of Jerusalem and the rest of Palestine. In deference to Jerusalem's status as the Holy City, British commander General Allenby walks into the city as a liberator, rather than making a conqueror's triumphal entry.

== Cast ==
- Peter Phelps as Dave Mitchell
- Shane Briant as Captain Reichert
- Ralph Cotterill as General Friedrich Kress von Kressenstein
- Bill Kerr as Lieutenant-General Sir Harry Chauvel
- Grant Piro as Charlie
- Tony Bonner as Lieutenant-Colonel Murray Bourchier
- Serge Lazareff as Major George Rankin
- Gary Sweet as Frank
- John Walton as Tas
- Tim McKenzie as Chiller
- Jon Blake as Trooper Scotty Bolton
- Patrick Frost as Sergeant Ted Seager
- Adrian Wright as Lawson
- Sigrid Thornton as Anne, a nurse
- Anthony Andrews as Major Richard Meinertzhagen
- Anthony Hawkins as General Sir Edmund Allenby
- Gerard Kennedy as Colonel Ismet Bey
- Jon Sidney as Brigadier-General William Grant
- Graham Dow as Major-General Henry Hodgson
- James Wright as Brigadier-General Percy FitzGerald
- Steve Bastoni as Turkish Demolition Soldier
- Anne Scott-Pendlebury as Sister
- Simon Palomares as Turkish Officer
- Brenton Whittle as Padre

== Production ==
The script was written by Ian Jones, who had long been interested in the Australian Light Horse ever since they featured in an episode of Matlock Police in 1971. He visited Beersheba in 1979 and had carefully researched the period. Simon Wincer came on board as director and he succeeded in helping secure a $6 million pre sale to RKO. Antony I. Ginnane's Film and General Holdings Company succeeded in raising the rest of the money. Simon Wincer later claimed that Ginnane, Ian Jones and himself had to put in their own money at some stage when the film looked like falling over. Well-known Australian cinematographer Dean Semler was also brought in.

The Battle of Beersheba had previously been featured in Forty Thousand Horsemen.

Despite being set in Palestine and Egypt, the film was shot entirely on location in Victoria and Hawker, South Australia. After the final day of filming had wrapped on 1 December 1986, actor Jon Blake was injured in a car accident near Nectar Brook, South Australia. He suffered permanent paralysis and brain damage.

The musical score was composed by Mario Millo. The original soundtrack recording was produced for compact disc release courtesy of Antony I Ginnane by Philip Powers and Mario Millo for Australian distribution in Australia by 1M1 Records and as a coupling with Shame on LP in the US. The movie was re-cut to a shorter length for the US release, which Wincer thought made the second half better, although he did not like the opening as much.

=== Historical inaccuracies ===
The German Empire flag on General Kressenstein's car features a band of red above a band of white above a band of black. In reality, the colours were ordered black-white-red.

== Reception ==
The film received mixed reviews from critics. Rotten Tomatoes gives it a 67% approval rating based on 6 reviews.

Roger Ebert, reflecting other critics' opinions, stated that "I was disoriented almost all the way through the movie." but that in the climax, "I haven't seen a better action scene with horses since "Ben Hur"." An unfavourable review came from The New York Times, who stated the film was "a sort of pacifist-aggressive war adventure" and that "None of the performances are really bad, but none are very good". The Washington Post also gave the film a negative review, described it as "Mostly ... equine cinematography, a four-legged coffeetable movie about the Australian cavalry.".

The film grossed A$1,617,288 in Australia after its release in 1987 which is equivalent to 8.25 million in 2009 dollars. It was also released in Canada, Sweden, the United Kingdom, and the United States in 1988. It was considered a commercial disappointment, yet Wincer claims its pre-sales and television sales were about $6 million or 60% of the budget. The film won an AFI award in 1988 for Best Original Music Score and another for Best Achievement in Sound. It was also nominated for Best Achievement in Cinematography. The Lighthorsemen is included in the Australian Film Commission's Top Australian films at the Australian box office list at number 83.

== See also ==
- Cinema of Australia
- Forty Thousand Horsemen
