= Anzacs =

- Written by: John Dixon; John Clarke
- Directed by: John Dixon; George T. Miller; Pino Amenta
- Starring: Andrew Clarke; Jon Blake; Paul Hogan
- Theme music composer: Bruce Rowland
- Country of origin: Australia
- Original language: English
- No. of episodes: 5

Production
- Producers: Geoff Burrowes; Dennis Wright
- Cinematography: Keith Wagstaff
- Editors: Philip Reid; Ray Daley
- Running time: 480:27
- Budget: A$8,196,000.

Original release
- Network: Nine Network
- Release: 27 October – 31 October 1985

Anzacs is a 1985 Australian five-part television miniseries set in World War I. It is named after Australian and New Zealand Army Corps (ANZAC). The series follows the lives of a group of young Australian men who enlist in the 8th Battalion (Australia) of the First Australian Imperial Force in 1914, fighting first at Gallipoli in 1915, and then on the Western Front for the remainder of the war.

It follows in the wake of Australian New Wave war films such as Breaker Morant (1980), Gallipoli (1981), and precedes The Lighthorsemen (1987). Recurring themes of these films include the Australian identity, such as mateship and larrikinism, the loss of innocence in war, and also the continued coming of age of the Australian nation and its soldiers (the Anzac spirit).

== Episodes ==
No.	Title	Original release date
1	"The Great Adventure"	27 October 1985
The series begins in 1914, in the Western District of Victoria (Australia). Martin Barrington, the son of a wealthy British-born land-owner, is persuaded by his best friend, stockman Dick Baker, to enlist to fight in the Great War. They are joined by Dick's sister Kate, who will become an army nurse. They become part of the 8th Battalion led by Lieutenant Armstrong and Sergeant McArthur. Other members of the platoon include Roly Collins, Bill Harris, Pat Cleary, and the Johansen brothers. By April 1915 the platoon, having trained in Australia and Egypt, take part in the Allied invasion of Turkey at Gallipoli. Suffering heavy casualties during the landing, both of the Johansen brothers are killed and Barrington is badly wounded. He recuperates at a hospital on the Greek island of Lemnos and rekindles his romance with Kate. In August, the platoon take part in the bloody Battle at Lone Pine, and in the close-quarters fighting Baker is killed. In December, the platoon, of which only six original members remain, are quietly evacuated from the peninsula along with the rest of the Anzac forces.
2	"The Big Push"	28 October 1985
In 1916 the platoon, now re-enforced, arrives at the Western Front in France. Among the new members are the German-born Wilhelm 'Kaiser' Schmidt, Dinny Gordon, 'Pudden' Parsons, Lewis-gunner 'Bluey' and Privates Upton and Morrissey. In France, Cleary soon proves himself an expert 'scrounger' and distributor of stolen goods. In London, Australian journalist Keith Murdoch, who had been at Gallipoli, meets with British War Secretary Lloyd George who has a dislike of British Army commander Douglas Haig. During a raid on the German lines, Morrissey is killed and Barrington proves his leadership skill. In July, the platoon take part in the Somme Campaign at Pozières. The attack breaks down in confusion, forcing Barrington and Flanagan to assume leadership roles. Behind the lines, Haig informs Murdoch that the Germans have concentrated all of their reserve artillery on the Pozières sector in an effort to contain the Australians. The platoon suffers heavy losses, and Upton is killed trying to warn the platoon's relief, and Collins suffers from shell-shock. After a long battle, the dazed and traumatised survivors stagger back to the rear.
3	"The Devils Arithmetic"	29 October 1985
As the debate in Australia over conscription causes bitter political and social divisions, the platoon are sent back into the Somme sector, now bogged down in the cold and mud of winter. Max Earnshaw arrives as a new lieutenant and initially proves to be a less-than-inspiring officer. By 1917, the Allied High Command plan new offensives to break the Hindenburg Line. The platoon takes part in the Allied attacks at Arras, where Sgt McArthur is killed and Pudden deserts, and is then given a spell of leave in Blighty. Back in France, Armstrong is sent home on psychiatric grounds and is replaced by the unpopular Captain Young. Pudden is later found hiding out among a group of deserters and agrees to return to his unit. The platoon then takes part in a new offensive at Passchendaele, where Young proves himself incompetent, Barrington is badly wounded, Gordon deserts after murdering several German prisoners, and Lt. Earnshaw is blinded by a shell. Meanwhile, Lloyd George has lost all faith in Haig (who is nevertheless promoted to the rank of field marshal by King George V). At a field hospital, Kate manages to save a desperately wounded Barrington.
4	"Fields of Fire"	30 October 1985
By the winter of 1917, the platoon is now holding the line in the mud around Ypres, and disillusionment has infected much of the Allied army. To make matters worse, word arrives that Russia has surrendered following the Russian Revolution, allowing the German army on the Eastern Front to be sent to France. Barrington and Flanagan are now both officers, with Barrington now assisting Australian General John Monash, and Flanagan finding and killing the deserter Gordon. The massive German Spring Offensive then begins in March 1918, shattering the depleted British 5th Army, and for the first time since 1914, the Western Front breaks open. Barrington, on a forward scouting mission for Monash, takes command of a group of British survivors, helping them dig in to fight the advancing Germans. Flanagan, now commanding the company, is ordered to a defensive position at Hazebrouck where they are instructed to hold off the advancing Germans. They are joined by a handful of surviving Tommies, and Bluey's skill with the Lewis gun is put to good use. Now promoted to Sergeant Major, Harris also displays considerable courage and skill despite his past secrets.
5	"Now There Was A Day"	31 October 1985
By summer-autumn 1918, the Anzacs are weary and yearn for the war to end. American soldiers ("Yanks") arrive in the British sector and are trained by the Anzacs. The company takes part in the Allied counter-offensives organised by General John Monash, now commanding a unified Australian Corps. With superior organisation, better co-ordination between forces and tank and air support, the attacks on Hamel achieve much success, sending the Germans falling back in retreat. Barrington recommends Flanagan to be awarded a VC after destroying a German machine gun post. In October, while clearing out an enemy-held village, both Barrington and Pudden are killed by retreating German soldiers. Over the first weeks of November, the remaining veterans wearily advance eastwards, and are overjoyed when news of the Armistice ends the war. In November 1919, one year after the conclusion of the war, the surviving veterans reunite back in Australia for the unveiling of the new war memorial. Kate and Flanagan are now a couple and Collins is set to become a journalist working for Sir Keith Murdoch. Cleary, Harris, Kaiser and Bluey also attend, as do a fragile Armstrong and Earnshaw. Reverend Lonsdale reads a moving tribute to the Anzacs, and Collins reads from the Ode of Remembrance. As a bugler plays, the scene dissolves to the fields of the Somme in the present day.

== Cast ==
=== Main ===
- Andrew Clarke as Martin Barrington
- Jon Blake as Robert Flanagan
- Paul Hogan as Pat Cleary
- Christopher Cummins as Roly Collins
- Jonathan Sweet as Bill Harris
- Megan Williams as Kate Baker
- Shane Briant as 'Kaiser' Schmidt
- Alec Wilson as 'Pudden' Parsons
- Peter Finlay as 'Bluey'
- Bill Kerr as General Monash

=== Supporting ===
- Tony Bonner as Harold Armstrong
- David Lynch as Max Earnshaw
- Ilona Rodgers as Lady Thea Barrington
- Elaine Lee as Madame
- Robert Coleby as Reverend Lonsdale
- Peter Browne as Carter

=== Additional ===
- David Bradshaw as Keith Murdoch
- Mark Hembrow as Private Dick Baker
- Jim Holt as Dinny 'Dingo' Gordon
- Patrick Ward as Sergeant Tom McArthur
- Edmund Pegge as Captain Young
- Wayne Jarratt as Private Upton
- Karl Hansen as Erik Johansen
- Tony Cornwill as Karl Johansen
- Terry Brittingham as Private Morrissey
- James Wright as Edward Kelly
- Vincent Ball as Sir Rupert Barrington
- Sheila Kennelly as Mrs Baker
- Howard Bell as Cyril Earnshaw
- Diana Greentree as Mrs Collins
- Leah Steventon as Marie
- Vivean Gray as Matron
- Mark Mitchell as a dying German soldier
- Bruce Kerr as Lancashire Fusiliers Lieutenant Colonel
- Gareth Wilding-Forbes as Buffs Officer
- Chris Gregory as German Sergeant
- Noel Trevarthen as Douglas Haig, 1st Earl Haig
- Michael Adams as General Kiggell
- Rhys McConnochie as Lloyd George
- Malcolm Robertson as General Bridges
- Sean Myers as Lt General Walker
- Reg Evans as General Birdwood
- Chris Waters as General White
- Francis Bell as Major-General Elliott
- Geoff Parry as General Blamey
- Peter Hosking as Major Driscoll
- Terry Gill as Colonel
- Terry McDermott as Colonel
- Peter Moon as English Batman
- Alex Menglet as Hans

== Production ==
The series was the idea of John Dixon who originally wanted to make a documentary. In 1979 he approached producer Geoff Burrowes and they decided to make a drama of 16 one hour episodes. It was decided to pull back to 13 hours, and then Burrowes hired James Mitchell and John Clark to work on scripts with Dixon. By 1983 they had 13 scripts but Burrowes was dissatisfied and decided to make it into five two-hour scripts.

It was produced for Nine Network, Australia. The episodes were directed by Pino Amenta, John Dixon, or George Miller (of The Man from Snowy River fame). The story consultant was Patsy Adam-Smith and the filming took place over 20 weeks.

The actors playing British officers and politicians were almost all New Zealanders. Many of the extras playing the roles of Allied, American, and German soldiers were serving members of the Australian Army. This was done to keep costs down so that actors did not have to learn how to act as soldiers or to have to teach them how to use the weapons. Many of the actors would also appear on the US TV series Mission Impossible which was filmed mostly in Australia.

In one episode, an Australian soldier remarks how much the French countryside reminds him of Daylesford back home in Victoria, Australia. This was an in-joke as some scenes were filmed near Daylesford, including the German counter-attack scene in episode 4.

== Music ==
Australian composer Bruce Rowland composed the original music for the series which also popularised many old marching songs of the period. The classic Australian song 'Waltzing Matilda' is heard at several points as is 'It's a Long Way to Tipperary'. Several songs from the satirical musical 'Oh, What a Lovely War!' were also used, including the title song, 'I wore a tunic', 'The bells of Hell' and other period numbers, like 'If you were the only girl' and 'keep the home fires burning' – which were performed by various actors.

A 45-minute cassette tape of the soundtrack, entitled ANZACS : original soundtrack from the television mini series, was released in 1985.

Side 1	Side 2
Opening theme; Riding with Kate; Martin and Kate's love theme; Young German's letter; Off to war; MacArthur gets hit; Ma Baker meets Rolly's mum; The battle for Gallipoli; We're going home; Keep the home fires burning	Oh what a lovely war; Rolly meets Marie; Madamoiselle from Armentiers; Palm Court Waltz; Lt. Harold Armstrong; Hello, hello, who's your lady friend; The French cafe; Pompey Elliott's march; The war in Europe; Sad reflections

== Reception ==
Well noted for its humour and historical accuracy, the series was "a huge rating success for the Nine Network when it aired". According to the review by James Anthony: "The battle scenes are terrific and the muddy trenches of the Western Front look acceptably cold and horrible. [Then again] Some of the acting goes a bit astray and there is sometimes a bit too much play on larrikinism and ockerness, but overall it sits well as a quality drama with good characters." In the 2003 book German Anzacs and the First World War by John F. Williams, even more contextual detail is provided: "'Anzacs' is essentially a very long buddy movie in the form of television soap. While much care, research and funding obviously went into making the battle scenes and historical ambience as realistic as possible, the characters are two dimensional and clichéd. Even so, on occasion 'Anzacs' does offer insights that are unexpected and subtle"

== International release ==
The series was first aired in the UK on 12–16 January 1987 during weekday afternoons.

It was also repeated on Sunday evenings during June and July 1987 on BBC1 in primetime.

== Media ==
DVD cover

The complete series was released on VHS in the late 1990s in Australia. A 3-disc set of DVDs is available. The DVD breaks down the content of the episodes as follows:

- The Great Adventure – Australia in 1914; Outbreak of war; Recruitment; Training; Gallipoli: Landing/stalemate/withdrawal. [96:43]
- The Big Push – Arrival in France (1916); Nursery Sector; The Battle of the Somme; Pozières. [96:36]
- The Devils Arithmetic – The Somme Winter (1916–17); The Hindenburg Line; Bullecourt; Blighty Leave; Third Battle of Ypres begins (July 1917); Menin Road; Broodseinde Ridge. [97:08]
- Fields of Fire – Third Battle of Ypres bogs down (November 1917); The German Offensive (March 1918); The Battle of Amiens; Hazebrouk; Battle of Nieppe Forest. [94:52]
- Now There was a Day – The Yanks are coming; "peaceful penetration"; Monash appointed Commander of the 5 Australian Divisions; Battle of Hamel; The "Jack ups" Monash's Big Push (8 August 1918)... Armistice (11 November 1918); Back Home. [95:08]

The total running time is 513 minutes (episodes plus bonus material), or 520 mins (episodes plus bonus material) for Region 2, and rated "M". The DVD also includes a featurette – Making Of: History in the Making – The Making of Anzacs. This was narrated by well known Australian actor Charles "Bud" Tingwell who had served in the Royal Australian Air Force during World War II and included interviews (from the time of filming) with Geoff Burrowes and John Dixon as well as the actors who appeared in the series.

A condensed movie-length version, cut down to two hours and 45 minutes from the original eight, was released on VHS in the United States. The series has yet to be released on DVD in other regions. A Region 2 3-disc DVD set is now available from Source1 Media in the Netherlands. While the box set has Dutch text on the back on the cover and optional Dutch subtitles on the discs it does provide a viable option for British or other English speaking viewers in Europe.

== See also ==
- ANZAC Girls
