= Gerry Duggan (actor) =

Irish-Australian actor (1910–1992)

- Duggan as 'Hawker' in Goldfinger (1964)
- Born: Gerald Joseph Duggan; 10 July 1910; Dublin, Ireland
- Died: 27 March 1992 (aged 81); Sydney, New South Wales, Australia
- Occupation: Actor
- Years active: 1959–1990
- Spouse: Helen Blood (m. 1942; death 1972)
- Children: 1

Gerald Joseph Duggan (10 July 1910 – 27 March 1992) was an Irish-Australian character actor. He was almost 50 when he made his first film, The Siege of Pinchgut (1959), which earned him a BAFTA Award nomination for Most Promising Newcomer.

Although he never achieved leading man stardom, he was a familiar face in small roles in film and television, both in Australia and Britain, as well as on the West End stage. His trademarks were his Irish brogue, pronounced lisp and prominent jaw.

== Early life ==
Duggan was born and raised in Dublin in 1910. When he was 16-years-old he moved to New York City, where he had his early exposure to theatre acting. In the 1930s, he moved to Australia, where he settled, although he worked internationally.

== Career ==
He was almost 50 when he made his first film, The Siege of Pinchgut (1959), a British production made in Australia, which was the last film from Ealing Studios. Duggan was nominated for the BAFTA Most Promising Newcomer Award for his role as Pat Fulton, a caretaker taken hostage by escaped convicts, but lost to the 13-year-old Hayley Mills in Tiger Bay. However the performance launched his career.

During the 1960s, he would appear in numerous British films and television series, including The L-Shaped Room (1962), The Servant (1963), and Goldfinger (1964). He returned to Australia in the following decade, where he'd work with directors like New Wave directors like Gillian Armstrong, Philippe Mora, Fred Schepisi, and Phillip Noyce.

He appeared in many other television series in Australia and Britain, such as A Country Practice, Mother and Son, The Flying Doctors, Skyways, The Sullivans, Matlock Police, Number 96, Spyforce, Division 4, Boney, Skippy the Bush Kangaroo, The Avengers and Coronation Street. Duggan also played the title role in the 1986 children's television series Professor Poopsnagle's Steam Zeppelin.

Duggan continued to act on stage in between film and television commitments. In 1964, he appeared in the British debut of Samuel Beckett's play The Old Tune. In a role he regarded as the high point of his stage career, he played the role of McLeavy in the 1966 London revival of Joe Orton's Loot, which transferred to the Criterion Theatre.

== Personal life ==
Duggan was married to Helen Blood from 1942 until her death in 1972. They had a son.

Later in life, he resided in the Beacon Hill suburb of Sydney.

=== Death ===
Duggan died in Sydney, at the age of 81, on 27 March 1992.

== Partial filmography ==
- The Siege of Pinchgut (1959) – Pat Fulton
- A Tongue of Silver (1959) – policeman
- On the Beach (1959) – Bit Part (uncredited)
- The Sundowners (1960) – Shearer
- Dentist on the Job (1961) – Commissionaire
- Go to Blazes (1962) – Fireman
- Serena (1962) – Norman Cole
- The L-Shaped Room (1962) – Bert
- The Servant (1963) – Waiter
- West 11 (1964) – Father Dominic
- Goldfinger (1964) – Hawker, James Bond's golf caddie
- Skippy the bush kangaroo (Serie 1968) |- Mr. Trundle
- Ned Kelly (1970) – Father O'Hea
- Ride a Wild Pony (1975) – Train Engineer
- Mad Dog Morgan (1976) – Martin
- The Devil's Playground (1976) – Brother Hanrahan
- The Singer and the Dancer (1977) – the Doctor
- The Picture Show Man (1977) – the Hall Secretary
- The Mango Tree (1977) – Scanlon
- Newsfront (1978) – Len's father
- My Brilliant Career (1979) – Squatter
- The Last of the Knucklemen (1979) – Old Arthur
- Slippery Slide (1980)
- Bliss (1985) – neighbour 1
- Dark Age (1987) – Joe Blunt
- The Flying Doctors (1988 serie)
