= The Argues: The Movie =

- Directed by: Mark Hembrow
- Written by: David Argue; Patricia Argue; Mark Hembrow; Steven Tandy; Stuart Thompson
- Story by: Mark Hembrow
- Produced by: Leyla Aziz; Colette Greer; David Hannay; William Mozer; Gary Tansley
- Starring: Rosslyn Abernethy; David Argue; Patricia Argue; Steven Tandy; Stuart Thompson
- Cinematography: William Mozer
- Edited by: Bob Flores; Brad Lidenmayer; Gary Watson
- Music by: Russell Dawson; Mark Hembrow
- Production companies: David Hannay Productions; Egmond Pacific Entertainment
- Distributed by: Peacock Films
- Release date: 16 November 2010
- Running time: 80 minutes
- Country: Australia
- Language: English

The Argues: The Movie is a 2010 Australian comedy film directed by Mark Hembrow and starring David Argue, Patricia Argue, Steven Tandy and Stuart Thompson. The mockumentary film was written by David Argue and Hembrow with improvisation by David Argue, Patricia Argue and Thompson. The film is based on the story of Argue's mother and her romance with the United States and Europe, where she ice skated in many famed shows with her now deceased husband, so David takes her on a sentimental journey revisiting the places she skated around the world while at the same time trying to land himself a Hollywood agent. The film is shot on location in Hollywood, New York City, Florence, Venice, Dubai and Melbourne. The Argues: The Movie's original title was Mum and Me.
