= Dags (film) =

- Directed by: Murray Fahey
- Written by: Murray Fahey
- Produced by: Murray Fahey
- Edited by: Brian Kavanagh
- Release date: 1998
- Country: Australia
- Language: English
- Budget: $26,000
- Box office: A$17,171 (Australia)

Dags is a 1998 Australian comedy film centring on the adventures of a group of friends, directed, produced and written by Murray Fahey.

It is not related to the Deb Oswald play Dags.

== Plot ==
A series of incidents involving a group of friends

== Cast ==
- Tanya Bulmer as Cheryl
- David Callan as Trevor
- Paula Arundell as Tracy
- Angus Sampson as Prozac
- Gabby Millgate as Muriel Video Addict
- Tom Gleeson as Wedding Dag
- Julia Zemiro as Additional Voice

== Production ==
Fahey wrote the film in three weeks, inspired by a desire to use talened actors he knew who were out of work:

I used all the places where I live and go shopping every day, and I wrestled with the changes that Australian society is going through. There is the older, traditional Australian dag and the newer, younger generation of dags. Then there are the ethnic dags. . . it’s a nice mixture of Aboriginal and Anglo dags . . .the older ones have stiffer barriers, but I wanted the kids to reveal themselves. They are all uniquely daggy and that’s the common ground. They don’t talk about their different cultures or their different ethnicity – they’re focusing on the footy or the car repairs.

Fahey financed the film on credit cards and mortgaging his mother's house.

It was shot in nine and a half days using a house that acted as four locations in one. It movie was shot between Christmas and New Year. "This was the best time because I could get all the crew I needed and the cast were free," said Fahey.

== Reception ==
Sandra Hall of the Sydney Morning Herald wrote the cast "generate a lot of unpretentious humour in a manic kind of way."
