= Tessa Humphries =

Australian actress

- Occupation: Actress
- Parents: Barry Humphries (father); Rosalind Tong (mother)

Tessa Humphries is an Australian actress, best known for her appearances in television soap operas.

== Career ==
Humphries performed in Cassandra as the title character, and also played Mary Reynolds in Sons and Daughters and Corinne Todd in Families. In 1995 she played Tracy in Sex Is a Four Letter Word. She also starred in Out of the Body as Neva St. Clair.

== Personal life ==
Humphries is the daughter of comedian Barry Humphries and his second wife, Rosalind Tong.

== Filmography ==
=== Film ===
| Year | Film | Role | Notes |
|---|---|---|---|
| 1977 | The Getting of Wisdom | Extra | Feature film |
| 1987 | Cassandra | Jill / Cassandra | Feature film |
| 1988 | Out of the Body | Neva St. Clair | Feature film |
| 1995 | Sex Is a Four Letter Word | Tracy | Feature film |
| 1997 | Paradise Road | Celia Roberts | Feature film |
| 2004 | Human Touch | Kate | Feature film |

=== Television ===
| Year | Film | Role | Notes |
|---|---|---|---|
| 1985–1986 | Sons and Daughters | Mary Reynolds | TV series |
| 1990–1991 | Families | Corinne Todd | TV series |
| 1991 | G.P. | Gabrielle | TV series Episode: "Telling Tales" |
| 1993 | Law of the Land | Hannah Scott | TV series |
| 2001 | The Secret Life of Us | Nerida | TV series Episode: "The Unbelievable Truth" |

=== Television (as self) ===
| Year | Film | Role | Notes |
|---|---|---|---|
| 1997 | The Movie Show | Herself with Bruce Beresford, Penne Hackforth-Jones | TV series, 1 episode |
| 1997 | Good Morning Australia | Guest | TV series, 1 episode |
| 1997 | Hey Hey It's Saturday | Guest | TV series, 1 episode |
| 2023 | Barry Humphries State Memorial | Herself | TV special |
| 2023 | 10 News First | Herself (Barry Humphries State Memorial) | TV series, 1 episode |
| 2023 | 7 News | Herself (Barry Humphries State Memorial) | TV series, 1 episode |

== Stage ==
| Year | Film | Role | Notes |
|---|---|---|---|
| 1981 | When Lips Collide | Dame Edith | Playbox Theatre, Melbourne with St Martins Youth Arts Centre |
