= Run (1991 film) =

1991 film by Geoff Burrowes

- Theatrical release poster
- Directed by: Geoff Burrowes
- Written by: Dennis Shryack; Michael Blodgett
- Produced by: Raymond Wagner
- Starring: Patrick Dempsey; Kelly Preston
- Cinematography: Bruce Surtees
- Edited by: Jack Hofstra; Stephen E. Rivkin
- Music by: Phil Marshall
- Production company: Hollywood Pictures
- Distributed by: Buena Vista Pictures Distribution
- Release date: February 1, 1991
- Running time: 91 minutes
- Country: United States
- Language: English
- Budget: $16 million
- Box office: $4 million

Run is a 1991 American action thriller film directed by Geoff Burrowes and starring Patrick Dempsey and Kelly Preston.

== Plot ==
Boston law student and part-time mechanic Charlie Farrow is asked by his boss to deliver a new Porsche from Boston to Atlantic City for a client. When he gets close to Atlantic City, the Porsche breaks down. While Charlie waits for the car to be repaired, a cab driver (who mistakes Charlie for an Atlantic City high roller) takes him to an underground casino that has a bar room and kitchen, so Charlie can get something to eat.

At the casino, Charlie incurs the wrath of Denny Halloran, who takes exception to Charlie beating him at poker. In the resulting fight, Denny trips over a potted palm, accidentally hits his head on the sharp corner of a counter, and dies. Charlie is now on the spot, because Denny happens to be the son of mob boss Matt Halloran, who is the owner of the casino and most of the police force, including Chief Travers and Lieutenant Martins, who think Charlie could be innocent.

Wrongfully accused of murdering Denny, Charlie finds himself on the run from both dirty cops and Matt's henchmen, all of whom want to collect the $50,000 bounty that Matt placed on Charlie. With only one ally, reluctant witness Karen Landers, who knows the truth and agrees to help Charlie, Charlie finds himself in a deadly game of cat and mouse. The bodies pile up as Charlie is pursued on a nightmare race through racetracks, amusement parks, bowling alleys and shopping malls by Matt's men, corrupt cops and Travers and Martins.

After Karen is wounded and two dirty cops die chasing him, Charlie surrenders himself to Travers and Martins, but they are pursued by two of Matt's men, Sammy and Marv, and run off the road. Travers and Martins are disabled, Travers more lastingly. Sammy and Marv take Charlie to Matt, who tells them to kill him, but he kills Marv, then Sammy, by causing them to fall off of a roof. After killing Matt's other henchmen, Charlie confronts Matt at Matt's dog-race track. Matt dies as he is impaled by a mechanical pacer rabbit that was speeding toward him. A recovering Martins arrives and places a reassuring hand on Charlie's shoulder telling him that "they sure messed with the wrong guy."

== Cast ==
- Patrick Dempsey as Charlie Farrow
- Kelly Preston as Karen Landers
- Ken Pogue as Matt Halloran
- A.C. Peterson as Denny Halloran
- James Kidnie as Sammy
- Sean McCann as Marv
- Michael MacRae as Officer O'Rourke
- Tom McBeath as Officer Smithy
- Marc Strange as Chief Travers
- Christopher Lawford as Lieutenant Martins
- William S. Taylor as Sergeant Halsey
- Jerry Wasserman as Halloran's Lieutenant
- Steve Adams as Frank
- Jonathan Bruce as Bill, Security Guard
- Peter Williams as Cab Driver Maurice
- Lochlyn Munro as College Buddy
- Michael Rogers as Electrocuted Gunman
- Gerry Bean as Cop At Karen's
- Garry Davey as Sergeant At Karen's
- Suleka Mathew as Casino Cashier
- Babz Chula as Poker Player
- Alex Diakun as Casino Maitre D'

== Production ==
It was the second feature directed by Geoff Burrowes, who was offered the job on the basis of the success of his first, The Man from Snowy River 2.

"If you want to do an action picture, it should be one that doesn't let up and for that reason this movie appealed to me enormously," he said. "In Run, we're projecting a situation which could quite conceivably happen to any member of the audience, a situation with which they can identify through a character who is fundamentally Everyman. We pose the question, `What would happen to me if I were caught up something in which I was an outsider, where all due process fell away and I were left alone?' "

Filming started in Vancouver in April 1990.

Kelly Preston replaced Tracy Pollan, who bowed out during early filming in May. According to a publicist, "The part had evolved and both parties agreed that she was no longer right for the role. There were no awful tantrums."

Burrowes later said "I've had the worst time of my life on this picture... it's been deeply vexacious. But I can also say I've some of the most exciting experiences in my film life."

== Reception ==
Roger Ebert wrote, "As a kind of action cartoon, the movie may work as a diversion for undemanding audiences. But it's really no more than a pinball machine, a brainless exercise in how to use action as a substitute for thought."
