= Mark Lee (Australian actor) =

Australian actor and director

- Born: 1958 (age 67–68); Sydney, New South Wales, Australia
- Occupations: Actor, director
- Spouse: Marianne
- Children: 2

Mark Lee (born 1958) is an Australian theatre and film actor and director, and singer. He played the lead role in the 1981 film Gallipoli, alongside Mel Gibson. Since then, Lee has worked extensively in Australian film, television and theatre.

== Career ==
He originally worked as a model and coffee house singer. His film debut was in 1970 in the film Strange Holiday (based on the novel by Jules Verne). After his success in Gallipoli (1981) he spent some time as a musician, playing and singing as front man in popular Sydney bands like One Way Ticket and The Idle Poor, performed in company with his Conservatorium-trained, violin-playing younger brother, David.

Lee also spent some years acting in, and frequently simultaneously directing, amateur plays.

He starred in the 1987 Australian television drama Vietnam (one of Nicole Kidman's early roles) and the 1988 gay cult film The Everlasting Secret Family. He also starred as a gay man in Sex Is a Four Letter Word. Lee also worked with James Belushi in the remake of Sahara in 1995. In 2000 he starred in Nowhere to Land as the antagonist Phillip Decon.

Apart from Gallipoli, most of his work has drawn little notice outside of Australia, save for a short film Stranger So Familiar, shown in the 2005 Reno Film Festival.

In 2001, he starred in the one-man show The Time Machine, adapted by Frank Gauntlett from the novelette by H. G. Wells, and directed by Penny Young. He also appeared in the acclaimed and controversial production of The Miracle of the Rose at Belvoir Street Theatre in Sydney, directed by film and theatre Robert Chuter.

His feature film directorial debut was an Australian film titled The Bet, released in 2007. He also made a documentary Mountains to the Sea, about a couple of pub bands, and directed the play Unit 46 in 1999.

In 2012, he reprised his role in The Time Machine at The Old 505 Theatre, Sydney.

In 2013/2014, he toured Australia in the theatrical production of a play based upon Agatha Christie's A Murder Is Announced, playing the character of Inspector Craddock. In 2013, he featured in the TV mini-series Paper Giants: Magazine Wars. Since 2015, he has had a recurring role in the TV series A Place To Call Home.

As of 2019, he is acting as Rick Booth (Dean's biological father) on Seven's Home and Away.

== Personal life ==
Lee enjoys cooking and traveling with his wife Marianne. The couple have two daughters.

== Filmography ==
=== Film ===
Year	Title	Role	Type
1969	Strange Holiday	Costar	TV movie, based on the novel by Jules Verne
1974	Lindsay's Boy	Kevin Lindsay	TV movie
1981	Gallipoli	Archy Hamilton	Feature film
1982	The Best of Friends	Bruce	Feature film
1983	The City's Edge	Jim Wentworth	Feature film
1986	News Report on a Journey to a Bright Future	David McGee	TV movie
1987	Emma's War	John Davidson	TV movie
1988	The Everlasting Secret Family	Youth	Feature film
1988	The Riddle of the Stinson	Co-pilot Bert Shepherd	TV movie
1995	Sahara	Jimmy Doyle	TV movie
1995	Blackwater Trail	Chris	TV movie
1995	Sex Is a Four Letter Word	John	Feature film
1998	Chameleon	Milo	TV movie
1999	Chameleon II: Death Match	Steven Myers	TV movie
1999	Without Warning	David	TV movie
2000	Nowhere to Land	Phillip Decon	TV movie
2001	One Born Every Minute	Ned Kelly	Short film
2002	Tree	Dad	Short flm
2002	The Shot		Short film
2002	The Junction Boys	Jack Gilmore	TV movie
2002	El Burro	David	Short film
2004	Black Jack	Black Jack	Short film
2004	The Wallet	Pete	Short film
2005	Stranger So Familiar		Feature film
2009	Shadows of the Past	Jack Kelly	Feature film
2009	At This Moment	Dad	Short film
2011	The Last Race	Clive Kershaw	Short film
2011	Cupid	Neptune	Short film
2014	The Gift	John	Short film
2014	Wraith Woods	Stramger	Short film
2018	Shooter	Jim	Short film
2018	Bring Me Back Ma	Mike	Short film
2020	Trapped	James	Short film

=== Television ===
Year	Title	Role	Type
1974	The Evil Touch	Andrew	TV series, 1 episode
1975	Behind the Legend	Maurice Kellerman	TV series, 1 episode
1975	The Seven Ages of Man		TV series, 1 episode
1976	Number 96	Robin Dunmore	TV series, 4 episodes
1977	The Restless Years	Lee Prentice	TV series
1977–1979	Bailey's Bird	Nick	TV series, 26 episodes
1978	Case for the Defence	Barry	TV series, 1 episode
1987	Vietnam	Laurie Fellows	TV miniseries, 10 episodes
1988	The Flying Doctors	Stewart Collins	TV series, 1 episode
1989	Naked Under Capricorn	Tim Roberts	TV miniseries, 1 episode
1992	A Country Practice	Dr Paul Beardsley	TV series, 2 episodes
1992	Boney	Dave O’Dwyer	TV series, 1 episode
1994	G.P.	Daniel Wallace	TV series, 1 episode
1996–1997	City Life	Nick Vogel	TV series, 3 episodes
1996–2000	Water Rats	Travis Dewar / Harry Pierce	TV series, 2 episodes
1996–2019	Home and Away	Rick Booth, Stuart Mitchell, Orson Cardillo	TV series, 20 episodes
1997	Twisted Tales	Frank	TV series, 1 episode
1998	Murder Call	Ian Blanfield	TV series, 1 episode
1998	All Saints	Chen Wai	TV series, 1 episode
1998–2000	Tales of the South Seas	Reverend Colin Trent	TV miniseries, 22 episodes
1999	SeaChange	BrettCauchi	TV series, 1 episode
2000–2001	Beastmaster	Hjalmar	TV series, 6 episodes
2001	Blonde	Porn Dealer	TV miniseries, 2 episodes
2001	Stingers	Leon King	TV series, 1 episode
2001	Ponderosa	Captain John Reilly	TV series, 1 episode
2004	The Mystery of Natalie Wood	William Russell	Miniseries
2004	Out There		TV series, 6 episodes
2011	Crownies	Geoffrey McMahon	TV series, 4 episodes
2012	Redfern Now	Barman	TV series, 1 episode
2013	Packed to the Rafters	Duncan Galloway	TV series, 5 episodes
2013	Paper Giants: Magazine Wars	Richard Walsh	TV miniseries, 2 episodes
2015	A Place To Call Home	Sir Richard Bennett	TV series
2021–2023	La Brea	Silas	TV series, 20 episodes
2025	Good Cop/Bad Cop	Earl	TV series, 1 episode

== Theatre ==
Year	Title	Role	Type
2001	The Time Machine		
	The Miracle Rose		Belvoir Street Theatre
2012	The Time Machine		The Old 505 Theatre, Sydney
2013/2014	A Murder Is Announced	Inspector Craddock	Australian tour

== Directing ==
Year	Title	Type
2007	The Bet	Feature film
	Mountains to the Sea	Documentary
1999	Unit 46	Play
