= Bob Ansett =

Australian businessman, actor, motivational speaker and writer

- Born: Robert Ansett; 8 August 1933 (age 93); Melbourne, Australia
- Known for: Founder of Budget Rent-a-Car Australia
- Spouse: Jossie Ansett (m. 1 January 1975)
- Children: 3
- Parent(s): Reg and Grace Ansett

Robert Ansett (born 8 August 1933 in Melbourne) is an Australian entrepreneur, actor, author, motivational speaker, and former chairman of the North Melbourne Football Club.

== Early life ==
Ansett is the son of Reg Ansett and Grace Ansett. Reg Ansett was the owner of various businesses, including Ansett Transport Industries, Diners Club Australia, Ansett Australia and, much later, Avis Australia.

Bob Ansett's parents divorced in 1941, when Bob was seven or eight years old. He, his mother Grace, and brother John, soon moved to the United States. Ansett grew up in the US state of Alaska, and has claimed that, during the 20 years he lived in the States, he saw his father no more than five times, their relationship seemingly severed by the distance between their places of residence. Ansett has said that he never visited his father's home in Mount Eliza, Victoria, or met his three stepsisters.

In 1955, he was drafted by the United States Army and served in Japan. In North America, Ansett attended the University of Utah with an American football scholarship.

== Budget Rent a Car ==
By 1965, Ansett was having financial difficulties in the United States. At the same time, the car rental industry in Australia was booming. Both federal and state governments in Australia took a protective stance regarding publicly owned companies, by restricting competition that might affect them.

The lion's share of the Australian car rental industry's business belonged to Avis Australia, which later belonged to Bob Ansett's father, Reg. Avis Australia had government contacts, as well as contracts with Qantas and Reg Ansett's airline, Ansett Australia, which led to Avis company being the sole licensed car rental operator at Australia's 56 major airports. With that in mind, Bob Ansett decided to return to Australia. He was in need of a job and asked his father for one, but was denied. Ansett then raised some capital and became licensed to use the name of Budget Rent a Car, the American car rental company, in Australia. That meant, in essence, when Reg Ansett bought Avis Australia in 1977, father and son became direct competitors. Bob Ansett opened the first Budget Australian location in Melbourne in 1965.

By the early 1980s, Ansett was known to Australians as Budget Australia's owner, appearing on commercials promoting the brand, and was known to occasionally show up himself at Budget locations to attend to the customers. Under Ansett's leadership, Budget had overcome, among others, the Avis operation of his father, Reg Ansett, and become the leading car rental company in Australia.

However, financial troubles loomed for the company, and several financial advisors cast doubt on Ansett's capabilities as a company president. In addition to that, Ansett did not maximise Budget's profits when the company had become the leading car rental company in Australia, because he did not consider profit a priority. There was also a financial dispute between Budget and Citibank, and the Ford Motor Company decided to stop shipping cars to Budget, which compounded the company's financial crisis.

In 1990, Ansett declared himself bankrupt, owing $65,000,000 to debtors.

== Acting career ==
Ansett's participation in Budget commercials made him a well-known figure in Australia and allowed him to launch a secondary career as an actor. He played himself in the 1980 short film Alive and Kicking, then he played his father, Reg, in the 1991 biopic television mini-series, Rose Against the Odds, about Australian world boxing champion Lionel Rose. During 1995, the mini-series had a cinema release as a feature film.

During 1996, Ansett appeared in the ABC TV reality series, Australian Story.

== Sports team owner ==
Ansett was the president, until 1991, of the Australian rules football team, the North Melbourne Football Club, a member of the Australian Football League.

== Motivational speaker ==
Ansett is a motivational speaker and has been on the roster of a number of companies in that area.

== Author ==
Ansett has written two books: Bob Ansett, an autobiography (1986) and The Customer (1989).

== Personal life ==
Ansett married a Japanese woman during his military service in Japan and they had three children.

He married Josephine Ansett (née Chadwick) on 1 January 1975. They have three children.

The Ansetts reside in Noosa, Queensland. In 1992, the Ansetts faced an eviction from their home, because of a federal court action brought over by Bob Ansett's bankruptcy trustee. After a five-year court battle, it was decided, on 28 March 1998, that the Ansetts would keep their home.

He was diagnosed with melanoma. He was, as of 2022, cancer-free.
