= Cool Change (film) =

1986 film by George T. Miller

- Directed by: George T. Miller
- Written by: Patrick Edgeworth
- Produced by: Geoff Burrowes; Dennis Wright
- Starring: Jon Blake; Lisa Armytage; Deborra-Lee Furness
- Cinematography: John Haddy
- Edited by: Philip Reid
- Music by: Bruce Rowland
- Production company: Burrowes Film Group
- Release date: 10 April 1986
- Running time: 89 minutes
- Country: Australia
- Language: English
- Budget: A$3.5 million
- Box office: A$60,868 (Australia)

Cool Change is a 1986 Australian action film directed by George T. Miller. It stars Jon Blake and Lisa Armytage. It was not a financial success despite coming from the same producer and director as The Man from Snowy River.

== Plot ==
The Victorian government want to declare the high country a national park, driving cattlemen off their land. Park ranger Steve Mitchell grew up in the area, but has been working on the coast. He is assigned to his old home.

Steve begins a romantic relationship with cattlewoman Joanna, who is an old girlfriend of his. Joanna is overstocking her property and her uncle is offering to buy her property; however she does not wish to sell, for the sake of her young son.

Lee, a political adviser for the state government, comes up to inspect the cattle damage and tries to seduce Steve by going for a topless swim. Joanna comes across them and believes Steve has been unfaithful.

James Hardwicke, a conservationist, clashes with a cattlemen. Joanna reveals that Steve is the father of her child. The government sends in park rangers with machine guns to clear cattle. Steve quits his job and discovers he is the father of Jo's son. Steve organises the cattlemen to help Jo, including his father and Jo's uncle, who have been feuding. They succeed in delaying the park rangers. Jo and Steve are united.

== Cast ==
- Jon Blake as Steve Mitchell
- Lisa Armytage as Joanna
- Deborra-Lee Furness as Lee
- David Bradshaw as James Hardwicke
- Alec Wilson as Bull Raddick
- Alan Fletcher as Rob Mitchell
- Wilbur Wilde

== Production ==
Geoff Burrowes, the producer, was a passionate advocate of cattlemen's issues in the High Country. His wife, Kerri Lovick, was from a long-standing cattle family around the cattle region. Burrowes had a huge box office success with The Man from Snowy River, set in cattle country, and owned two properties near Merrijog. The popularity of The Man from Snowy River enabled Burrowes to raise finance for a slate of projects including Anzacs, Free Enterprise (which became Running from the Guns), Future Tense (which became Dogs in Space), Backstage, The Man from Snowy River II and Cool Change. (Also announced bu never made was Clancy of the Overflow.)

The film was shot on location in Mansfield and the Victorian Alps.

Burrowes said:

My role is that of an entertainer. What one must not do is confuse the political reality with the entertainment reality. Cool Change I hope is not a polemic, not an exercise in didacticism. To make a low budget love story in the country, which is what I wanted to do... well, it would have been churlish to have turned one's back on the issue. It does not aim to solve the controversy of the High Country.

== Critical reception ==
The critic from the Sydney Morning Herald called the movie "a spectacularly simplistic propaganda piece for the cattle farmers of the Victorian high plains" that was "totally without passion".

The Sun Herald wrote "If you can switch off from the silliness of the caricatured characters and their cartoon style drama you might find it quite restful to watch the high country go - so spectacularly - by."

According to the Ozmovies website:

The film will perhaps now be mainly of interest to an academic constructing a thesis on the environmental wars in Australia in the 1980s - there's rich pickings in the caricatures, stereotypes and confused treatment of the issues on hand in the film (such as the film explaining how the cattlemen are the guardians of the high country, caring for it, while at the same time the incompetent heroine is overstocking her run, and the cattlemen are conspiring to help her out).

== Box office ==
Cool Change grossed $60,868 at the box office in Australia, which is equivalent to $132,692 in 2009 dollars.
