= Out of the Body =

- Theatrical film poster
- Directed by: Brian Trenchard-Smith
- Written by: Kenneth G. Ross
- Produced by: Charles Hannah; David Hannay
- Starring: Mark Hembrow; Tessa Humphries
- Cinematography: Kevan Lind
- Edited by: Alan Woodruff
- Music by: Peter Westheimer
- Production companies: Premiere Film Marketing; Medusa Communications; David Hannay Productions
- Distributed by: CBS/Fox Video
- Release date: 1988
- Running time: 89 minutes
- Country: Australia
- Language: English
- Budget: A$600,000 (est.)

Out of the Body is a 1988 Australian supernatural thriller film directed by Brian Trenchard-Smith.

== Plot summary ==
In Sydney, Australia, there's a killer on the loose, removing the eyes of his female victims. The only hope of catching him lies in an astral traveller named David Gaze, who is the prime suspect.

== Cast ==
- Mark Hembrow as David Gaze
- Tessa Humphries as Neva St. Clair
- Margaret Trenchard-Smith (as Margi Gerard) as Maggi Jarrott
- Tim Campbell as Security Guard
- Linda Newton as Carla Duprey
- John Clayton as Sergeant Whittaker
- Helen O'Connor as Barbara Sloan
- John Ley as Senior Detective Delgarno

== Production ==
The film was one of four pictures made around the same time by executive Tom Broadbridge. The others were Kadaicha, The 13th Floor and Vicious.
