= Mark Hembrow =

Australian actor, writer and musician (born 1955)

- Born: 1955 (age 70–71); Brisbane, Australia
- Other name: Robert Mark Hembrow
- Education: Ashgrove State School; St Peters Lutheran College, Indooroopilly
- Occupations: Actor; writer; director; producer
- Years active: 1973-present
- Known for: The Young Doctors
- Spouse: Nathalie Stanley (divorced)
- Children: 3

Mark Hembrow (born 1955 in Brisbane) is an Australian actor, writer and musician. He has also worked as a producer and director.

== Early life and family ==
Hembrow's parents were Vernon Charles Hembrow, a senior English Literature Lecturer at the Kelvin Grove Teachers Training College, and Sally Hembrow, a daytime television personality and presenter and cooking specialist. Sally produced her own television show for QTQ9 on the Nine Network, 'Living Graciously', which aired from 1963 to 1973. She was a forerunner for women in television, food, fashion and interior decor in Australia. Sally also had a radio show on 4KQ named 'Hotline to the Oven'.

Hembrow's education was at Ashgrove State School and then St Peters Lutheran College, Indooroopilly. He has one brother, John.

== Personal life ==
Hembrow was married to Nathalie Stanley, whom he met while in Trinidad and Tobago filming The Last Island (1990). They have three daughters together, Amy (born June 1990), Emilee (born January 1992) and Tammy (born April 1994), who are well-known social media personalities and entrepreneurs. It is unknown when Hembrow and Stanley divorced.

== Career ==
Mark first stepped on stage at age 16 at La Boîte Theatre Company as Barnaby Tucker in The Matchmaker and then Sandy in Hay Fever and Apollo in Fetch Me a Fig Leaf: The Musical, all directed by Graham Johnson. He then performed the lead in Once Upon a Mattress at the Brisbane Arts Theatre, which was to be his last amateur production at aged 17.

At 18 years of age, Mark first started working professionally for the main company at Queensland Theatre Company where he worked in productions over two years while doing in-service training. Productions included Springle a secondary school theatre and education production, written by Bille Brown to celebrate 100 years of education. He also performed in Equus, School for Scoundrels, Savages, Jumpers, The Department, Hamlet and Fourth of July before heading to Sydney.

His first professional jobs in Sydney were with the Old Tote Theatre Company (now Sydney Theatre Company) in a production of The Night of the Iguana, and on television series The Young Doctors as Georgie Saint. He then worked on two musicals, The Rocky Horror Show and Paradise Regained, followed by his first feature, Goodbye Paradise directed by Karl Schultz. Mark featured in many television shows and films over the years.

Mark returned home from the USA, and decided to have a break from acting for a number of years, in order to raise his family. During this time, he wrote two feature film scripts and was composing music.

Recent guest roles on Australian television include The Straits directed by Rachel Ward and Old School starring Bryan Brown and Sam Neill by Matchbox Productions.

== Credits ==
=== Film ===
Year	Title	Role	Notes
1981	Desire		
1981	Rusty Bugles		
1981	Desire		Short film
1982	The Highest Honour	Able Seaman F.W. Marsh	
1982	Goodbye Paradise	Igor	
1983	At Last... Bullamakanka: The Motion Picture	L.D. Jones	
1983	Platypus Cove	Paddy O’Neill	TV movie
1984	Who Killed Hannah Jane?		TV movie
1987	High Tide	Mechanic	
1987	Running from the Guns	Peter	
1988	The Man from Snowy River 2 (aka Return to Snowy River)	Seb	
1988	Sons of Steel	Mal	
1988	Out of the Body	David Gaze	
1990	The Last Island	Frank	
1992	Dial-A-Cliché		Short film
1992	Redheads	Brewster	
1993	4-Eva		Short film
1993	Exchange Lifeguards (aka Wet & Wild Summer!)	Max	
1995	On the Dead Side		
1997	Heaven's Burning	Truck Driver	
2003	Swimming Upstream	Tommy	
2015	Brothers	Todd	Short film
2019	Chiroptera	Boris	Feature film
TBA	Run	Valet	Short film
TBA	The Crypto Kids	Charles Balak	

=== Television ===
Year	Title	Role	Notes
	Mr Squiggle	Guest Singer	
	Patrol Boat		
1977–1980	The Young Doctors	Georgie Saint	55 episodes
1978	Shimmering Light	Peter	TV movie
1978	Father, Dear Father in Australia	Ken	1 episode
1979	TV Follies		Episode: "Hollywood"
1980	Celebrity Tattle Tales	Self	
1980	Home Sweet Home	Brian	1 episode
1980; 1982	Spring & Fall	Mickey	Anthology series, 2 episodes
1982	Jonah	Waxy	Miniseries, 4 episodes
1982	1915	Boof Lucas	Miniseries, 4 episodes
1985	Anzacs	Private Dick Baker	Miniseries, 2 episodes
1986	Robbery (aka The Great Bookie Robbery)		TV movie
1986	Last Chance	Angus	TV movie
1988	Fragments of War: The Story of Damien Parer	Padre	TV movie
1988; 1990	The Flying Doctors	Tony Downes / Bob Archer	2 episodes
1991	Animal Park	Jim Pryor	
1992	The Adventures of Skippy	Paul Watson	1 episode
1993	Phoenix	Damian Thorpe	
1992	Phoenix	Damien Thorpe	1 episode
1993	Time Trax	Rufio Jans	1 episode
1995	G.P.	Mr David 'Dave' Barber	1 episode
1998	Misery Guts	Arnold Flashman	4 episodes
2000	Tales of the South Seas		Miniseries, 1 episode
2001	The Lost World	Hyde	1 episode
2012	The Straits	Ambrose	Miniseries, 1 episode
2014	Old School	Perry Robertson	Miniseries, 1 episode

=== Stage ===
Year	Title	Role	Notes
c.1971	The Matchmaker	Barnaby Tucker	La Boîte Theatre Company
c.1971	Hay Fever	Sandy	La Boîte Theatre Company
c.1971	Fetch Me a Fig Leaf: The Musical	Apollo	La Boîte Theatre Company
c.1972	Once Upon a Mattress	Lead	Arts Theatre, Brisbane
1974	Springle		Queensland Theatre Company
1975	Equus	Horseman	SGIO Theatre, Brisbane with Queensland Theatre Company
1976	Hamlet	Bernardo	SGIO Theatre, Brisbane with Queensland Theatre Company
1976	Jumpers	Jumper	SGIO Theatre, Brisbane with Queensland Theatre Company
1976	The School for Scandal	Sir Toby Bumper / William	SGIO Theatre, Brisbane with Queensland Theatre Company
1976	Fourth of July		SGIO Theatre, Brisbane with Queensland Theatre Company
1976	The Department	Hans	SGIO Theatre, Brisbane with Queensland Theatre Company
1976	And the Big Men Fly	Floor Man	SGIO Theatre, Brisbane & QLD tour
1976	Savages	Indian	Queensland Theatre Company
1978	The Rocky Horror Show	Rocky	Rialto Theatre, Brisbane with G & M Promotions
1978	The Night of the Iguana	Wolfgang	Sydney Opera House with Old Tote Theatre Company
1979	The Amazing Adventures of Razz, Gabble and Skid		QLD tour with Karm Productions
1979	Paradise Regained	Satan	Q Theatre, Penrith
1980	The Golden Goose and Other Stories	Ass / 1st Miller / Mayor / 2nd Miller / Simpleton	Q Theatre, Penrith
1980	The Country Boy	Harry Smith	Tom Jones Dinner Theatre, Brisbane

=== As writer / producer ===
Year	Title	Role	Notes
1978	Shimmering Light	Writer	TV movie
1979	The Amazing Adventures of Razz, Gabble and Skid	Creator / Producer / Music & Lyrics Librettist	QLD stage tour with Karm Productions
1983	At Last... Bullamakanka: The Motion Picture	Writer	Feature film
1985	Anzacs	Writer	Miniseries
1987	Running from the Guns	Writer	Feature film
1988	Out of the Body	Writer	Feature film
2012	The Argues: The Movie (aka Duck Struck	Writer / Producer	Feature film
2010	Didge on Fire	Executive producer	Music video

== Discography ==
=== Singles ===
List of singles, with selected chart positions
Year	Title	Peak chart positions
Year	Title	AUS
1977	"If I Had Time"	58
