= Get Away, Get Away =

- Directed by: Murray Fahey
- Written by: Murray Fahey
- Produced by: Murray Fahey
- Starring: Murray Fahey
- Cinematography: Peter Borosh
- Edited by: Brian Kavanagh
- Music by: Frank Strangio
- Production company: Coventry Films
- Release date: 1993
- Running time: 86 minutes
- Country: Australia
- Language: English

Get Away, Get Away is a 1993 Australian Road Comedy film which was the directorial debut of actor Murray Fahey.

== Plot ==
Bank teller Rick Carter (Murray Fahey) gets away for the weekend on the advice of used car salesman Andrew (Glennen C.C. Fahey). He runs into a beautiful French hitchhiker, Suzette (Annie Davies), and some criminals, Carl the Mouth (Ewan Campbell) and Benny the Brain (Ned Manning).

== Cast ==
- Murray Fahey as Rick Carter
- Glennen C.C. Fahey as Andrew
- Annie Davies as Suzette
- Ewan Campbell as Carl the Mouth
- Rodd Hibbard as Darren the Cafe
- Ned Manning as Benny the Brain

== Production ==
The film was shot in Sydney over two weeks on 16mm from January 1991 to August 1992.

== Release ==
It was not released theatrically in Australia but did sell overseas.
