= Cubbyhouse =

2001 film by Murray Fahey

- Australian DVD cover
- Directed by: Murray Fahey
- Written by: Ian Coughlan; Murray Fahey
- Produced by: Mikael Borglund; Chris Brown; Murray Fahey; Gary Hamilton; David Hannay
- Starring: Joshua Leonard; Belinda McClory; Lauren Hewett; Jerome Ehlers; Craig McLachlan
- Cinematography: Phil Cross
- Edited by: Marcus D'Arcy; Brian Kavanagh; Antonio Mestres
- Music by: Peter Dasent
- Production companies: Cubbyhouse Production; David Hannay Productions; Pictures in Paradise; Complete Post
- Release date: 10 December 2001 (UK video premiere)
- Running time: 89 minutes
- Country: Australia
- Language: English
- Budget: $5 million

Cubbyhouse is a 2001 Australian horror film, directed by Murray Fahey and starring Joshua Leonard (of The Blair Witch Project fame) and Belinda McClory (The Matrix). It screened at the 2001 Cannes Film Festival.

It was produced by David Hannay who said: "I’ve been a fan of Murray Fahey’s since he was a film school student and I regard him as almost unique in being a true independent filmmaker who writes, produces, directs and acts in his own films."

== Plot ==
Lynn, a mother of three, buys a cheap, old house. However, the backyard cubby-house is cursed with pure evil that took the previous owner’s two children – and Lynn's kids are next.

== Cast ==
- Joshua Leonard as Danny Graham
- Belinda McClory as Lynn Graham
- Lauren Hewett as Bronwyn McChristie
- Jerome Ehlers as Harrison / Harlow
- Craig McLachlan as Bill
- Chris Brown as Newsreader
- Peter Callan as Don
- Madison Dohnt as Hope
- Murray Fahey as Gary the Pest Man
- Carita Farrer as Sandra Hickey
- Belinda Gavin as Julie
- Steve Harman as Nurse
- Brian Hinzlewood as Joe McChristie
- Stefan Kluka as Surf Reporter

== Reception ==
Film critic David Stratton in Variety, wrote that the film "fails to come up with anything very original or genuinely exciting in the highly competitive horror stakes."
