= Reg Ansett =

Australian businessman and aviator

- Ansett c. 1950s
- Born: Reginald Myles Ansett; 13 February 1909; Inglewood, Victoria, Australia
- Died: 23 December 1981 (aged 72); Mount Eliza, Victoria, Australia
- Occupations: Businessman; Aviator
- Years active: 1926−1980
- Spouses: Grace Ansett; Joan Adams Ansett
- Children: John Ansett; Bob Ansett; Janet Ansett; Jane Ansett; Jillian Ansett

Sir Reginald Myles Ansett KBE (13 February 1909 – 23 December 1981) was an Australian businessman and aviator. He was best known for founding Ansett Transport Industries, which owned one of Australia's two leading domestic airlines between 1957 and 2001. He also established a number of other business enterprises including Ansett Pioneer coachlines, Ansett Freight Express, Ansair coachbuilders, Gateway Hotels, Diners Club Australia, Biro Bic Australia and the ATV-0 television station in Melbourne and TVQ-0 in Brisbane which later became part of Network Ten. ATI also bought out Avis Rent a Car and had a 49% interest in Associated Securities Limited (ASL). In late 1979, mainly due to the collapse of ASL, Ansett lost control of the company to Peter Abeles of TNT and Rupert Murdoch of News Corporation who became joint managing directors.

== Biography ==
=== Early life ===
Reginald Myles Ansett was born in Inglewood, Victoria, on 13 February 1909. His father owned a garage before World War I when he enlisted in the Australian Imperial Force. After the war, his father established a knitting factory in Camberwell and Ansett gained qualifications as a knitting-machine mechanic at Swinburne Technical College. He was an enthusiastic private pilot, having obtained his licence in 1926 (No. 419).

=== Career ===
He went north to work as an axeman in a Northern Territory survey team. For a time, he entertained the idea of buying land in the territory to grow peanuts. He found himself unemployed when the Commonwealth government cut off the funds for the survey. On returning to Victoria in December 1931, with his savings he purchased a second-hand Studebaker and began a service car operation between Ballarat and Maryborough carrying passengers and small items of freight. When this proved uneconomic, he switched the Ansett Motors operation to a Ballarat to Hamilton service. The wealthy graziers of Victoria's western district proved to be a much better market. Within a few years he had a small fleet of service cars operating to towns in western Victoria.

==== Ansett Airways 1936–1946 ====
By 1935, Ansett Motors and other operators were proving a thorn in the side of Victorian Railways, taking both passenger and freight revenue. The Victorian Transport Minister and Attorney General Robert Menzies pushed a bill through the state parliament prohibiting service cars from competing with Victorian Railways, slashing Ansett Motors' revenue overnight. Looking around for an alternative, Ansett decided to try an air service. What made this attractive was that air services were controlled by the Commonwealth government, so the state could not intervene.

On 17 February 1936 Ansett Airways Pty Ltd inaugurated its first service, from Hamilton to Melbourne using a diminutive six-seater Fokker F.XI Universal. The flights operated daily each way, Monday to Friday. The service was a modest success and the Fokker was joined by an Airspeed A.6 Envoy. To help boost his funds, he entered, but failed to win, the Brisbane to Adelaide air race in 1936, losing to C. D. Pratt overall, and to Mr & Mrs J. W. F Collins in the speed section (also being beaten by Ivy May Pearce, one of a number of female competitors). On weekends he took the Universal on barnstorming tours of Victoria giving joyflights to paying customers.

To fund its expansion, he listed the company on the Melbourne Stock Exchange on 14 April 1937, offering 250 000 shares at £1 ($2) each. A base, including a flying school, was established in a hangar at Melbourne's Essendon Airport. He found selling the shares hard going. A number of aircraft crashes, notably the loss of Airlines of Australia's Stinson in southern Queensland in 1937, had dampened public enthusiasm for airline investments. Underwriters refused to handle the float so he had to find investors himself. It was a difficult time but he eventually interested enough wealthy individuals in the western district.

Needing new aircraft, he ordered three Lockheed L.10A Electras. Under the Empire Preference Scheme, aircraft from Britain could be imported duty-free; Aircraft from anywhere else paid import duties. Ansett Airways Limited had posted a £30 000 ($60 000) loss in its first year and its shares had more than halved in value. His bankers refused to advance the money to pay Lockheed £50 000 ($100 000) for the Electras which were being held in bond awaiting payment of £14 000 ($28 000) in duty. His first priority was to get the aircraft released, so he lobbied T W White, Minister for Customs in the Lyons government. He argued there was no British equivalent aircraft available and that British airlines had ordered them for their own fleets. White accepted the argument and the duty was waived.

To pay Lockheed, he went back to the banks who agreed to finance the purchase providing his wealthy grazier investors guaranteed the loan. The investors backed him, but at the price of Ansett handing over most of his personal shares in Ansett Airways. Australian National Airways (ANA), the major Australian airline at the time, headed by Ivan Holyman and backed by five British shipping companies, made a takeover bid for Ansett in 1938. While Holyman did not take Ansett Airways seriously, he was attempting to create a major airline monopoly in Australia. Ansett was one more opponent to be eliminated by takeover. At this stage Ansett Airways shares had dropped to 8s (80 cents). The Ansett chairman Ernest O'Sullivan was a banker with no experience in the airline business. When Holyman offered 9s (90 cents) per share for Ansett Airways, he and the board of directors jumped at it. Determined not to lose his fledgling business, Ansett called an extraordinary meeting of shareholders. In the heated confrontation he convinced enough shareholders to back him and the bid failed. O'Sullivan resigned on the spot.

No sooner was this battle won that Ansett Airways came close to disaster. On 22 February 1939, a fire broke out in the Essendon hangar. The Fokker Universal and one of the Electras were destroyed. Surveying the wreckage in the light of day, Ansett told his staff he was determined to continue. By the end of 1939, Ansett Airways was flying from Melbourne to Adelaide via Mildura and Renmark; from Sydney to Adelaide via Mildura and Broken Hill and Melbourne to Sydney via Narrandera. The company also continued with the original Melbourne-Hamilton service. Around this time, Ansett Airways continued to receive a subsidy payment of around £16 000 ($32 000) per annum from the Commonwealth government.

World War II was a time of boundless opportunities for Ansett. In 1942, he abandoned all his airline routes except Melbourne-Hamilton and concentrated on performing engineering work and charter flights for the United States Army Air Corps. The Essendon hangar was expanded and by war's end the tiny Ansett organisation was employing around 2,000 people. The Ansett organisation finished the war flush with cash but facing trouble trying to regain its airline routes which had been taken over by ANA.

In 1943, the Commonwealth Department of Civil Aviation released a discussion paper Post-war Reorganization: Proposal Outline of a Plan for Civil Aviation. The Curtin Labor government was developing plans for various nationalised industries when the war ended. One industry in their sights was the airlines. Apart from the United States, most countries had adopted a policy of state ownership of airlines. On 22 December 1944, acting prime minister Frank Forde announced the government would legislate to nationalize all interstate airlines. Their prime target was Australian National Airways (ANA). Following the passage of the Australian National Airlines Act on 16 August 1945 the private enterprise airlines mounted a challenge in the High Court. When this was successful the government changed its strategy and formed the Australian National Airlines Commission which was to operate as Trans Australia Airlines (TAA), competing directly with ANA.

==== Postwar Expansion 1946–1956 ====
Faced with being caught in the middle of a titanic struggle between Australian National Airlines and the new government owned airline, he offered to sell Ansett Airways to the Commonwealth government as a going concern. Although the idea had some attraction to the Chifley government, nothing came of the proposed deal. Ansett decided to continue his airline business while building up the Ansett Motors side.

As he gradually obtained new routes out of Melbourne, he made the decision to position Ansett Airways as a low cost competitor offering no-frills flights between the major capitals. He cut the standard fare being offered by ANA and TAA by 20 per cent. Douglas DC-3 aircraft normally seated 21 passengers, three abreast. He installed narrower seats to create a four abreast 28 passenger layout. There was little in the way of catering or other amenities. The strategy was a success, although TAA quickly adopted the lower price he was offering. ANA ignored him and suffered for it. TAA introduced the new 'Tourist Class' offer on its Vickers Viscount aircraft in 1955.

Both the coachline and road freight businesses were highly successful businesses and by 1962, Pioneer Coaches was running 245 buses throughout the country. In 1956, he established an airfreight business using Aviation Traders Carvairs which were Douglas DC-4s converted to enable cargo to be loaded through the nose.

Ansett was the first Australian airline to move into the package holiday business. In 1947, Ansett started offering services to resorts on the Great Barrier Reef using Catalina flying boats. These services established the Great Barrier Reef as a destination for tourists. ATI subsequently took over its rival, Barrier Reef Airways. Ansett developed Hayman Island into a major holiday resort in the Whitsunday region. BRA's Short S.25 Sandringham flying boats were later used by Ansett Flying Boat Services on the Sydney-Lord Howe Island route. The service, from Rose Bay Base on Sydney Harbour, was maintained until 1974.

==== Takeover and consolidation of ANA 1957–1969 ====
On 18 January 1957, Ivan Holyman, managing director of ANA, died in Honolulu. ANA had only kept going because of Holyman's determination not to give up. The five British shipping companies that owned the airline had been trying to get out for several years. The ANA board tried to get the Commonwealth to buy the airline and merge it with TAA, however, their asking price was considered ludicrous.

Ansett saw his opportunity. He made an offer of £3.3 million ($6.6 million) which the ANA board promptly rejected. Questions were asked about where Ansett would obtain the funds. There were stories about backing from two major oil companies. Later that year, on 23 August, ANA accepted the original offer. The ailing ANA operation was taken over by Ansett Transport Industries to create a new national airline: Ansett-ANA. Ansett was now in the big time, but he still had to make Ansett-ANA competitive with the government airline, TAA, which was much better managed and had a superior aircraft fleet.

Ansett acquired ANA's fleet of Douglas DC-6s and acquired six Vickers Viscounts in order to better compete with TAA. After the acquisition, Reg Ansett suddenly became a firm supporter of the two-airline policy. It became more restrictive after the passage of the Airlines Equipment Act in 1958 prescribing what aircraft each airline could buy and much else besides. Reg Ansett had advocated the act to stop TAA from buying French Sud Aviation Caravelle aircraft which would have been the first jets imported into Australia.

During the late 1950s and 1960s, Ansett purchased a number of regional airlines including MacRobertson Miller Airlines, Guinea Airways, and Butler Air Transport. Ansett also offered services to New Guinea. In 1964, Reg Ansett would import the first Boeing 727s following a coin toss with the managing director of TAA as to which company would import them first. In 1968, Reg Ansett changed the name of Ansett-ANA to Ansett Airlines of Australia. By 1969, Ansett had become Australia's leading domestic airline and its market share would rise as high as 55%.

He expanded his business interests into television in the 1960s. In April 1963, his Austarama Television company was granted a television licence to operate Melbourne's third commercial television station ATV-0, starting constructing studios in Nunawading a few months later. ATV-0's first official broadcast was on 1 August 1964. Ansett expanded his television interests to become a major shareholder in Universal Telecasters, licencees of TVQ-0 Brisbane, in 1965 and buying out the station entirely in 1970. He was appointed Knight Commander of the Order of the British Empire (KBE) in 1969. At that point, he was managing director of Australia's biggest airline and the biggest transport company in the southern hemisphere. Because of its regional services, Ansett was the world's biggest operator of Fokker Friendships.

==== Challenges in the 1970s ====
In 1972, Peter Abeles' Thomas Nationwide Transport launched a takeover bid for Ansett Transport Industries. This bid was thwarted with the assistance of Victorian Premier Sir Henry Bolte. This was due to both a longstanding friendship between Bolte and Reg Ansett. Moreover, Bolte was keen to save a Victorian company from being taken over by a NSW firm. After Bolte's retirement, he would become a director of Ansett Transport Industries.

Ansett's views on women in aviation were widely viewed as sexist. He once described stewardesses over 30 as old boilers and claimed that women were unsuitable to be pilots because of their menstrual cycles. In 1978, Deborah Wardley took the company to the Victorian Equal Opportunity Board for discrimination. Wardley was a charter pilot who claimed that she was better qualified to be hired than other male pilots that had been hired. Ansett claimed that they hadn't discriminated against her because she was a woman but because she had the potential to fall pregnant. On 29 June 1979, the Equal Opportunity Board ruled in favor of Wardley and directed that Ansett Airlines should recruit her at the next intake. Ansett delayed its training intake and appealed to the Supreme Court of Victoria but the appeal was dismissed. Ansett appealed the Supreme Court decision to the High Court of Australia in October 1979, but employed Wardley pending the outcome of the case. The High Court dismissed Ansett's appeal in March 1980.

In late 1979, Abeles and Rupert Murdoch launched a successful takeover of Ansett Transport Industries. Under the new management structure, Abeles and Murdoch would be joint managing directors with Reg Ansett as chairman. Murdoch would take over ATV-0 and merge with Ten-10 in Sydney to effectively give him control of what is now the Ten Network. Abeles would merge the freight operations with TNT and run the airline.

In 1980, Ansett sold TVQ-0 to a joint venture between petrol company Ampol and Sydney radio station 2SM.

=== Personal life ===
He married twice. From his first marriage, to Grace, he had two sons, John and Robert (Bob). After their divorce, Grace took the boys to live in the USA. He married Joan Adams in 1944 and they adopted three daughters, Janet, Jane and Jillian. The new family lived on the Ansett estate at Mount Eliza. From the early 1960s Ansett traveled to and from the office by helicopter each day, a remarkable thing to do in the days when few Australian CEOs even had chauffeured cars. Bob Ansett returned from the US in the 1960s to work for his father; and eventually, after Ansett sr. denied him work, purchased an established hire car company, Budget Rent a Car. However, Reg Ansett never acknowledged his son's presence in Australia. In later years they were to become bitter business rivals as Ansett Transport Industries owned a competing company, Avis, which at the time held a monopoly on hire car services at Australian airports. The ABC documentary, Dynasties: The Ansett Family, revealed that the family of Lady Joan Ansett – who died in 2003 – was still in legal turmoil.

=== Death ===
Ansett fell ill several months before his death, and returned home from the Peninsula Private Hospital at Frankston to spend Christmas with his family. The first indications of the seriousness of his illness came at the annual meeting of Ansett Transport Industries Ltd in November when, for the first time in 44 years, he failed to attend and give his chairman's address. He died on 23 December 1981 at his personal estate in Mount Eliza.

=== Legacy ===
The Ansett House at Peninsula Grammar was named after Sir Reginald Ansett and continues to hold his name as of 2026.

A Qantas Airbus A380, registration VH-OQH, was named Reginald Ansett in his honour.
