= Jon Blake (actor) =

Australian actor (1958–2011)

- Born: Paul Jonathan Blake; 10 December 1958; Hornsby, New South Wales, Australia
- Died: 30 May 2011 (aged 52); Central Coast, New South Wales, Australia
- Other name: Sonny Blake
- Occupation: Actor
- Years active: 1977–1986

Paul Jonathan Blake (10 December 1958 – 30 May 2011) billed as Jon Blake and Sonny Blake, was an Australian actor who was primarily active in the 1980s. He appeared in several TV shows and films, including a leading role in Scott Hicks's Freedom (1982), before a car accident in 1986 left him severely disabled.

== Early life ==
Blake was born Paul Jonathan Gleason in the Sydney suburb of Hornsby in 1958, an only child of parents who were classical musicians. His mother was first violinist for the Sydney Symphony Orchestra. Blake's family moved back and forth between New Zealand and Australia before permanently settling in Sydney when he was ten.

In his youth, Blake trained as a professional boxer and studied music at the Sydney Conservatorium. He spent several years in student and experimental theatre groups and took private acting lessons while working as an usher at a city cinema complex.

While attending Glenaeon, an independent K-12 school at Middle Cove, New South Wales, Blake acted in many school productions. In 1976, an acquaintance of his history teacher who was a TV producer was considering various actors to appear in a new TV soap called The Restless Years.

== Career ==
The Restless Years became Blake's first screen credit on commercial television. He was credited as Sonny Blake. During his time on the show, Blake continued to take acting lessons and would eventually study at the Stella Adler Studio of Acting in New York City. After leaving The Restless Years, Blake worked in television and theatre, including playing a role in the revival of On Our Selection.

Blake quickly progressed to miniseries and films. One of his highest-profile parts was a starring role as Flanagan in 1985 big-budget Australian television miniseries Anzacs, alongside Paul Hogan and Andrew Clarke. He joined the cast after Gary Sweet relinquished the part to accept a role in An Indecent Obsession. He also appeared in western drama series Five Mile Creek (opposite Nicole Kidman in an early role) and soap opera A Country Practice.

Blake's film credits included a main role in 1982 Ozploitation thriller Early Frost and the lead role in Scott Hicks' 1982 film Freedom. He also featured in 1984 docudrama The Slim Dusty Movie, in which he played 'Young Slim'. Fresh from filming Anzacs, Blake had a starring role in Cool Change (1986), before going on to film Free Enterprise (1987), later renamed Running from the Guns. His final film role was in 1987 war film The Lighthorsemen. alongside Peter Phelps.

Blake's looks led to him being named by Cleo magazine as one of their most eligible bachelors of 1986. His charismatic presence led to him being dubbed "the next Mel Gibson", with mentions of several work opportunities in the United States and talk of a new Mad Max film.

== Accident ==
On 1 December 1986, Blake was badly injured in a car accident while driving home after the last day of filming The Lighthorsemen in the South Australian desert. An oncoming car appeared in his path and he swerved to avoid it, crashing into a car which was parked on the side of the road. Blake was not expected to survive the accident. His only external injuries were a slight graze on his cheekbone and a cut to his temple, but he sustained permanent brain damage in the accident and was left paralysed and unable to speak.

== Court cases ==
After several long and complex legal battles and appeals, represented by Sydney lawyer Tim Kelly, Blake was awarded $33.3 million in compensation for his caretaking and lost future earnings. This was later reduced to $7.67 million on appeal. The amount was decided on the basis that there was a 15% chance Blake would have attained superstar status in Hollywood and a 35% chance of him achieving considerable success. Academy Award-winning filmmaker George Miller, producer Hal McElroy, critic David Stratton and actor Peter Phelps all testified about Blake's potential.

Up until her death in 2007, Blake's mother Mascot was his primary caregiver. His son Dustin then cared for him until his death.

== Death ==
Blake died on 30 May 2011, aged 52, from complications from pneumonia.

== Filmography ==
=== Film ===
Title	Released	Role	Notes
1982	Early Frost	Peter Meadows	Feature film
1982	Freedom	Ron	Feature film
1984	The Slim Dusty Movie	Young Slim Dusty	Feature film
1986	Cool Change	Steve Mitchell	Feature film
1987	The Lighthorsemen	Trooper Sloan 'Scotty' Bolton	Feature film
1987	Running from the Guns	Davie	Feature film

=== Television ===
Year	Title	Role	Notes
1977–1979	The Restless Years	Alan Archer	142 episodes
1979	Patrol Boat	Mawson	Episode 5: "Follow the Leader"
1980	Slippery Slide	Chris Newsbury	TV movie
1982	A Country Practice	Jim	2 episodes
1983	Waterloo Station	Neil	
1983	Patrol Boat	Letich	Season 2, episode 4: "Hands to Bathe"
1984	The Boy in the Bush	Tom Ellis	Miniseries, 4 episodes
1984	Five Mile Creek	Trooper Wilson	Season 1, episode 9: "Home and Away"
1984	Cop Shop		Episode 545
1984	A Country Practice	Constable Steve Vargas	14 episodes
1984	Special Squad	Pig	Episode 13: "Jacko"
1985	Anzacs	Robert Flanagan	Miniseries, 5 episodes

== Theatre ==
Date	Title	Role	Venue / Co.
1979	On Our Selection	Joe	Jane Street Theatre, Nimrod Theatre Company
1980	No Names ... No Pack Drill	P.F.C. Wood	Theatre Royal, Sydney with STC
1980	Cyrano De Bergerac	Pickpocket / Poet / Cadet	Sydney Opera House with STC
1980	The Merry Wives of Windsor	Robin	Sydney Opera House with STC
