= Encounters (film) =

- Directed by: Murray Fahey
- Written by: Murray Fahey
- Produced by: Murray Fahey
- Starring: Kate Raison; Martin Sacks; Martin Vaughan; Maggie Kirkpatrick
- Cinematography: Peter Borosh
- Edited by: Brian Kavanagh
- Release date: 1993
- Running time: 90 minutes
- Country: Australia
- Language: English

Encounters (also known as Voyage into Fear) is a 1993 Australian thriller directed by Murray Fahey.

== Premise ==
A woman, Madaline, and her husband Martin return to the estate where they grew up. She becomes convinced she was responsible for the death of her younger brother some twenty years earlier and that her brother has returned and is trying to kill her. She discovers a missing husband and a pair of grizzled trappers.

== Cast ==
- Kate Raison as Madaline
- Martin Sacks
- Martin Vaughan
- Maggie Kirkpatrick

== Production ==
The movie was shot from 6 July to 1 August 1993.

== Reception ==
It premiered in Brussels at the Mystery and Suspense Festival.
