= Geoff Burrowes =

Australian filmmaker

Geoff Burrowes (born 1945) is an Australian filmmaker best known for the movie The Man from Snowy River (1982) and the TV mini-series Anzacs (1985); he was a founding partner of the Burrowes Film Group.

== Biography ==
Burrowes was a journalist who graduated from Monash University in 1970 and worked at Crawford Productions for four years. He spent a year as private secretary to Moss Cass and then worked in advertising with Philip Adams for three years.

Burrowes decided to make a feature film which resulted in the $2.6 million Man from Snowy River (1982). This was a huge success at the box office and enabled Burrowes to expand his operations with the Burrowes Film Group. The most successful of these was the mini series Anzacs and a sequel to Snowy River. However feature films Cool Change, Running from the Guns and Ground Zero did less well.

Burrowes went to Hollywood and directed a film there, Run. Burrowes disliked the experience.

He has since retired from filmmaking.

== Select Credits ==
- The Man from Snowy River (1982) - producer, story
- Anzacs (1985) - producer
- Cool Change (1985) - producer
- Running from the Guns (1987) - producer
- Backstage (1988) - producer
- The Man from Snowy River II (1988) - writer, director, producer
- Run (1991) - director
