= Murray Fahey =

Australian actor, writer and director

- Education: Australian Film, Television and Radio School
- Occupations: Film director, producer, actor

Murray Fahey is an Australian actor, writer and director.

== Select Credits ==
=== As actor ===
- Slate, Wyn & Me (1987) as Martin

=== As director ===
- Get Away, Get Away (1992)
- Encounters (1993)
- Sex Is a Four Letter Word (1995)
- Dags (1998)
- Cubbyhouse (2001)
- LoveStuck (2017)

=== Producer Only ===
- Alex and Eve (2016)
