= List of accolades received by The Dressmaker (2015 film) =

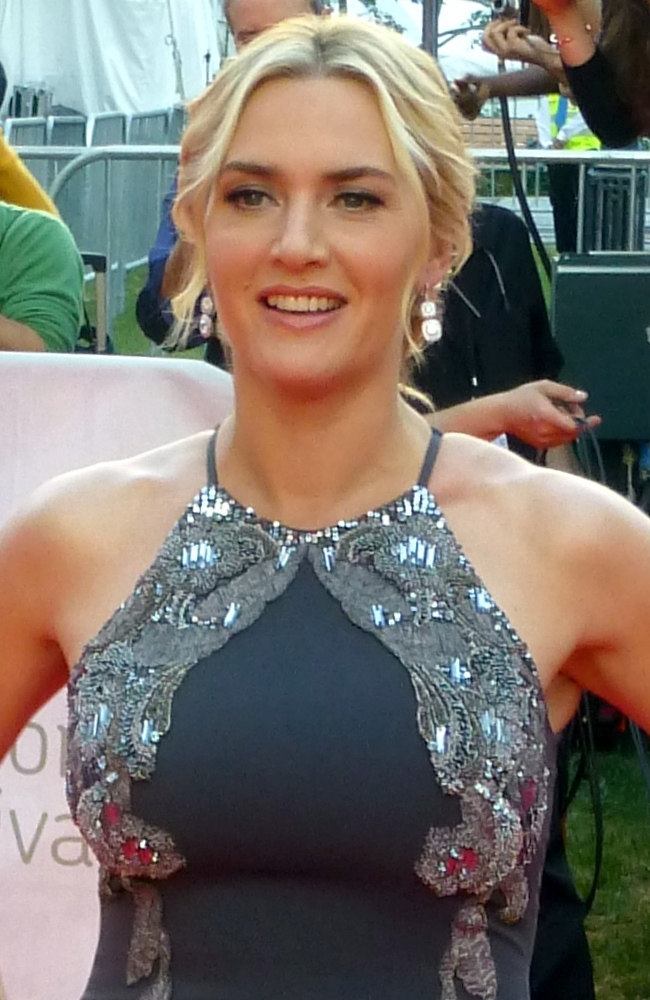
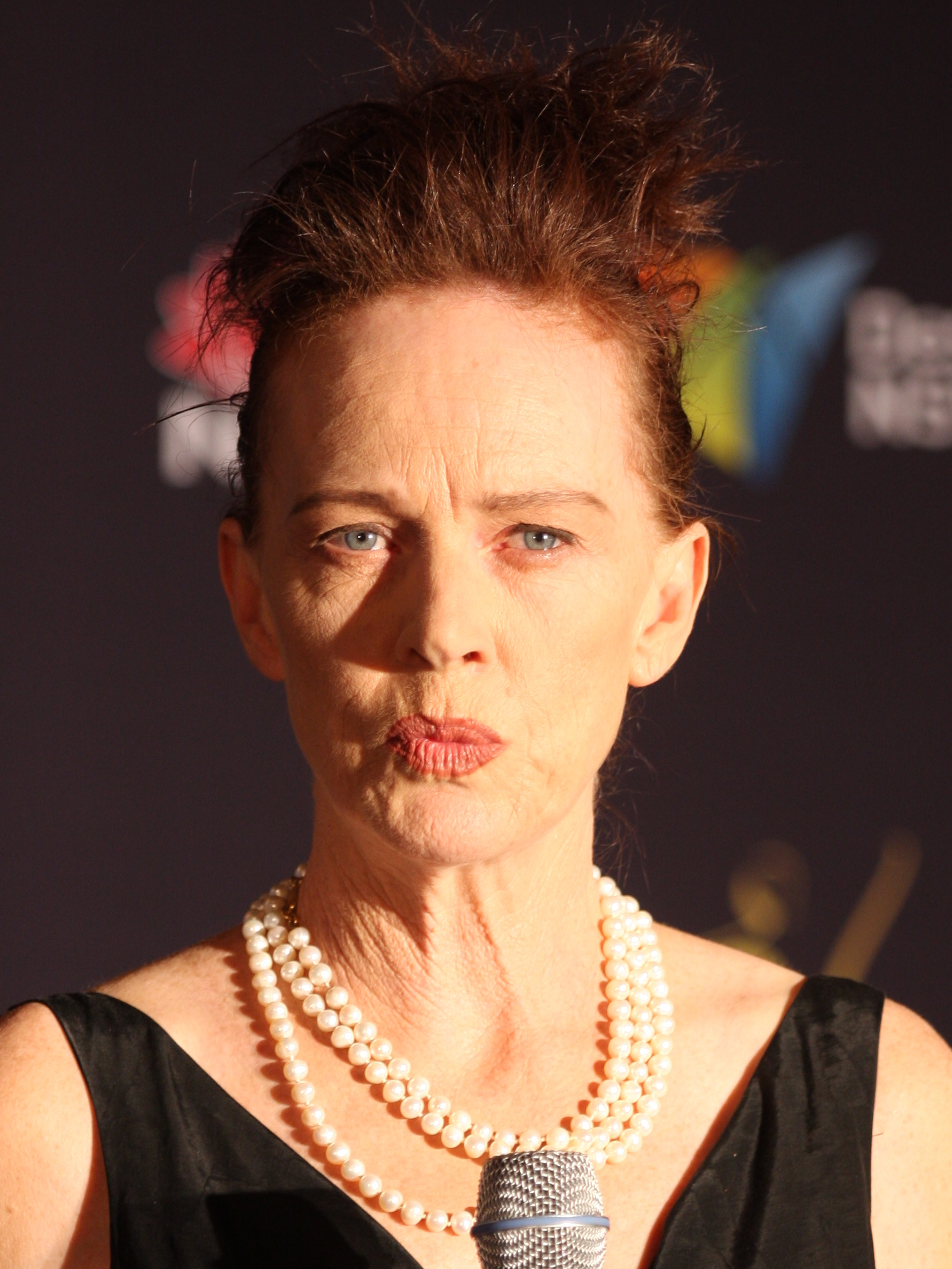
- Kate Winslet and Judy Davis received many awards and nominations for their work.
Accolades
Award	Won	Nominated
AACTA International Awards	5	13
AACTA International Awards	0	1
Australian Directors Guild	0	1
Australian Film Critics Association	4	7
Australian Movie Convention	1	1
Australian Screen Sound Guild	2	2
Casting Guild of Australia	0	1
Costume Designers Guild Awards	0	1
Dallas–Fort Worth Film Critics Association	0	1
Dorian Awards	1	1
Film Critics Circle of Australia	2	10
London Film Critics' Circle	0	1
Mill Valley Film Festival	1	1
San Diego Film Critics Society	1	2
Screen Music Awards	0	2
Screen Producers Australia	1	1
Women Film Critics Circle	0	4
- Total number of awards and nominations (Note: Certain award groups do not simply award one winner, they recognize several recipients and have runners-up. Since this is a specific recognition and is different from losing an award, runner-up mentions are considered wins in the awards tally.)
Totals	18	51
- References

The Dressmaker is a 2015 Australian revenge comedy-drama film written and directed by Jocelyn Moorhouse, based on the novel of the same name by Rosalie Ham. It stars Kate Winslet as a femme fatale in the titular role of the dressmaker, Myrtle "Tilly" Dunnage, who returns to a small Australian town to take care of her ailing, mentally unstable mother. It had a theatrical release on 29 October 2015 in Australia and New Zealand.

The film led the 5th AACTA Awards with thirteen nominations, including Best Film, Best Direction, Best Production Design, Best Original Music Score, Best Sound, Best Editing, Best Cinematography and won Best Lead Actress for Winslet, Best Supporting Actress for Judy Davis, Best Supporting Actor For Hugo Weaving, Best Costume Design for Marion Boyce and Margot Wilson, and People's Choice Award for Favourite Australian Film.

Apart from AACTA, Winslet and Davis both won awards from Australian Film Critics Association and Film Critics Circle of Australia for their performances. In addition, Davis was also nominated at AACTA International Awards for Best Supporting Actress.

In The Hollywood Reporter's annual critic picks, Davis's performance in the film was included among "the 25 Best Film Performances of 2016". It was one of the seven films shortlisted by the Academy Awards for Best Makeup and Hairstyling at the 89th ceremony.

== Awards and nominations ==
List of awards and nominations
Year	Group/Award	Category	Recipients	Result	Refs
2015	AACTA Awards (5th)	Best Film	Sue Maslin	Nominated	
2015	AACTA Awards (5th)	Best Direction	Jocelyn Moorhouse	Nominated	
2015	AACTA Awards (5th)	Best Lead Actress	Kate Winslet	Won	
2015	AACTA Awards (5th)	Best Supporting Actor	Hugo Weaving	Won	
2015	AACTA Awards (5th)	Best Supporting Actress	Judy Davis	Won	
2015	AACTA Awards (5th)	Best Supporting Actress	Sarah Snook	Nominated	
2015	AACTA Awards (5th)	Best Production Design	Roger Ford	Nominated	
2015	AACTA Awards (5th)	Best Costume Design	Marion Boyce and Margot Wilson	Won	
2015	AACTA Awards (5th)	Best Cinematography	Donald McAlpine	Nominated	
2015	AACTA Awards (5th)	Best Editing	Jill Bilcock	Nominated	
2015	AACTA Awards (5th)	Best Original Music Score	David Hirschfelder	Nominated	
2015	AACTA Awards (5th)	Best Sound	Andrew Ramage, Glenn Newnham, Chris Goodes, David Williams, Mario Vaccaro and Alex Francis	Nominated	
2015	AACTA Awards (5th)	People's Choice Award for Favourite Australian Film	Sue Maslin	Won	
2015	AACTA International Awards (5th)	Best Supporting Actress	Judy Davis	Nominated	
2015	Australian Directors Guild	Best Direction in a Feature Film	Jocelyn Moorhouse	Nominated	
2015	Australian Film Critics Association	Best Film	Sue Maslin	Nominated	
2015	Australian Film Critics Association	Best Director	Jocelyn Moorhouse	Nominated	
2015	Australian Film Critics Association	Best Actress	Kate Winslet	Won	
2015	Australian Film Critics Association	Best Supporting Actor	Hugo Weaving	Won	
2015	Australian Film Critics Association	Best Supporting Actress	Judy Davis	Won	
2015	Australian Film Critics Association	Best Supporting Actress	Sarah Snook	Nominated	
2015	Australian Film Critics Association	Best Screenplay	Jocelyn Moorhouse and P.J. Hogan	Won	
2015	Australian Film Critics Association	Best Cinematography	Doanld McAlpine	Nominated	
2015	Australian Screen Sound Guild	Best Film Sound Recording	Andrew Ramage, Dan Giles and Paradox Delilah	Won	
2015	Australian Screen Sound Guild	Best Film Sound Mixing	Chris Goodes	Won	
2015	Film Critics Circle of Australia	Best Film	Sue Maslin	Nominated	
2015	Film Critics Circle of Australia	Best Director	Jocelyn Moorhouse	Nominated	
2015	Film Critics Circle of Australia	Best Actress	Kate Winslet	Won	
2015	Film Critics Circle of Australia	Best Supporting Actress	Judy Davis	Won	
2015	Film Critics Circle of Australia	Best Supporting Actress	Sarah Snook	Nominated	
2015	Film Critics Circle of Australia	Best Supporting Actor	Hugo Weaving	Nominated	
2015	Film Critics Circle of Australia	Best Cinematography	Donald McAlpine	Nominated	
2015	Film Critics Circle of Australia	Best Music	David Hirschfelder	Nominated	
2015	Film Critics Circle of Australia	Best Production Design	Roger Ford	Nominated	
2015	Film Critics Circle of Australia	Best Editor	Jill Bilcock	Nominated	
2015	London Film Critics' Circle	British Actress of the Year	Kate Winslet (also for Steve Jobs and A Little Chaos)	Nominated	
2015	Mill Valley Film Festival	Audience Favorite, Silver Award – Mind the Gap: Women	Jocelyn Moorhouse	Won	
2015	Screen Producers Australia	Feature Film of the Year	Sue Maslin	Won	
2015	Women Film Critics Circle	Best Theatrically Unreleased Movie By Or About Women	Sue Maslin	Nominated	
2016	Australian Movie Convention	Highest Grossing Australian Film	Sue Maslin	Won	
2016	Casting Guild of Australia	Best Casting in a Feature Film	Christine King	Nominated	
2016	Costume Designers Guild Awards	Excellence in Period Film	Marion Boyce and Margot Wilson	Nominated	
2016	Dallas–Fort Worth Film Critics Association	Best Supporting Actress	Judy Davis	5th Place	
2016	Dorian Awards	Best Campy Film of the Year	Sue Maslin	Won	
2016	San Diego Film Critics Society	Best Supporting Actress	Judy Davis	Runner-up	
2016	San Diego Film Critics Society	Best Costume Design	Marion Boyce and Margot Wilson	Nominated	
2016	Screen Music Awards	Feature Film Score of the Year	David Hirschfelder	Nominated	
2016	Screen Music Awards	Best Soundtrack Album	David Hirschfelder	Nominated	
2016	Women Film Critics Circle	Best Movie by a Woman	The Dressmaker	Nominated	
2016	Women Film Critics Circle	Best Comedic Actress	Judy Davis	Nominated	
2016	Women Film Critics Circle	Best Ensemble	The cast of The Dressmaker	Nominated	

== See also ==
- 2015 in film
