= Casting Guild of Australia =

Australian professional society

The Casting Guild of Australia (CGA) is a professional society, founded in 2013 in Victoria, Australia. Its membership includes over 90% of all Australian casting directors for film, television, and theatre.

== Formation ==
According to Nick Hamon, casting director and Vice President of CGA that the idea of setting up a casting guild was in minds of Australian casting directors committee quite sometime. But it was not actualised until in 2013, committee member Mel Mackintosh wrote an email, emphasising on the need of the guild.

== Casting Guild of Australia Awards ==
In 2015, the CGA launched an annual awards ceremony to recognise excellence in Australian casting across film, television, advertising, theatre and online productions.

=== 2015 ===
The first ceremony was held on 23 November 2015 in Sydney and was co-hosted by Ewen Leslie and Sarah Snook. Filmmaker George Miller presented the Sirius Award for New Talent of the Future.

Category	Nominees	Work	Ref(s)
Best Film Casting	Kirsty McGregor	Last Cab to Darwin	
Best Film Casting	Nikki Barrett	Holding the Man	
Best Film Casting	Nikki Barrett and Ronna Kress	Mad Max: Fury Road	
Best Television Casting (Up to 6 Hours)	Anousha Zarkesh	Redfern Now	
Best Television Casting (Up to 6 Hours)	Christine King	The Code	
Best Television Casting (Up to 6 Hours)	Alison Telford	Glitch	
Best Television Casting (Up to 6 Hours)	Christine King and Anousha Zarkesh	Peter Allen: Not the Boy Next Door	
Best Television Casting (More Than 6 Hours)	Alison Telford	Please Like Me	
Best Television Casting (More Than 6 Hours)	Anousha Zarkesh	Rake	
Best Television Casting (More Than 6 Hours)	Christine King	Hiding	
Best TVC Casting	Natalie Jane Harvie	UWS – "Deng Adut"	
Best TVC Casting	Stevie Ray and Kirsty McGregor	Qantas – "Feels Like Home"	
Best TVC Casting	Nick Hamon	RACGP	
Best TVC Casting	Antonia Murphy	Play Sport Australia	

=== 2016 ===
The nominations were announced on 9 October 2016 and saw the introduction of the Best Casting in a Short Film category. The ceremony was held at the Holding Redlich offices in Sydney on 18 November. It was hosted by Danielle Cormack and Dave Eastgate.

Category	Nominees	Work	Ref(s)
Best Casting in a Feature Film	Stevie Ray and Kirsty McGregor	Down Under	
Best Casting in a Feature Film	Nikki Barrett	The Daughter	
Best Casting in a Feature Film	Christine King	The Dressmaker	
Best Casting in a Feature Film	Anousha Zarkesh	Alex & Eve	
Best Casting in a TV Drama	Anousha Zarkesh	Cleverman	
Best Casting in a TV Drama	Anousha Zarkesh	Ready for This	
Best Casting in a TV Drama	Nikki Barrett	Jack Irish	
Best Casting in a TV Drama	Kirsty McGregor	Doctor Doctor	
Best Casting in a TV Comedy	Tom McSweeney and David Newman	The Family Law	
Best Casting in a TV Comedy	Anousha Zarkesh	Rake	
Best Casting in a TV Comedy	Anousha Zarkesh	Black Comedy	
Best Casting in a TV Comedy	Kirsty McGregor	The Letdown	
Best Casting in a TV Miniseries or Telemovie	Anousha Zarkesh	The Principal	
Best Casting in a TV Miniseries or Telemovie	Kirsty McGregor	The Kettering Incident	
Best Casting in a TV Miniseries or Telemovie	Nick Hamon	Divorce	
Best Casting in a TV Miniseries or Telemovie	Kirsty McGregor	Secret City	
Best Casting in a Short Film	Danny Long	Dream Baby	
Best Casting in a Short Film	Nick Hamon	St Kilda Film Festival Trailer	
Best Casting in a Short Film	Stevie Ray and Kirsty McGregor	Problem Play	
Best Casting in a Short Film	Anousha Zarkesh	The Mother Situation	

=== 2017 ===
The nominations were announced on 20 October 2017. The ceremony was held at the Holding Redlich offices in Sydney on 17 November.

Category	Nominees	Work	Ref(s)
Best Casting in a Feature Film	Kirsty McGregor	Lion	
Best Casting in a Feature Film	Ben Parkinson	Don't Tell	
Best Casting in a Feature Film	Nikki Barrett	Hacksaw Ridge	
Best Casting in a Feature Film	Anousha Zarkesh	Hounds of Love	
Best Casting for TV Drama, Miniseries or Telemovie	Alison Telford	Seven Types of Ambiguity	
Best Casting for TV Drama, Miniseries or Telemovie	Alison Telford	Glitch	
Best Casting for TV Drama, Miniseries or Telemovie	Amanda Mitchell	Pulse	
Best Casting for TV Drama, Miniseries or Telemovie	Kirsty McGregor	Top of the Lake: China Girl	
Best Casting for TV Comedy	Tom McSweeney and David Newman	The Family Law	
Best Casting for TV Comedy	Stevie Ray	Here Come the Habibs	
Best Casting for TV Comedy	Kirsty McGregor	The Other Guy	
Best Casting for TV Comedy	Kate Leonard (original casting by Jane Kennedy)	Utopia	
Best Casting for a Short Film	David Newman	Banana Boy	
Best Casting for a Short Film	Daisy Hicks	Dreamweaver	
Best Casting for a Short Film	Danny Long	Fysh	
Best Casting for a Short Film	Antonia Murphy	SOOP	
Achievement in Casting	Janine Snape	Jasper Jones	
Achievement in Casting	Fountainhead Casting	Event Zero	
Achievement in Casting	Stevie Ray	High Life	
Achievement in Casting	Janine Snape	Macbeth	
Achievement in Casting	Emma Fleming	Testament	
Best Casting for a TVC	Antonia Murphy	MLA – "Australia Day"	
Best Casting for a TVC	Nick Hamon	Hungry Jacks – "Keeping it real"	
Best Casting for a TVC	Natalie Jane Harvie	Air BnB – "Until We All Belong"	
Best Casting for a TVC	Natalie Jane Harvie	Foxtel – Foxtel Now	
Best Casting for a TVC	Daisy Hicks	"The Next Steps" – Recognise TVC	
Best Casting for a TVC	Danny Long	Airtasker – "Like a Boss"	
Best Casting for a TVC	Danny Long	KFC	
Best Casting for a TVC	Antonia Murphy	Commbank – Multicultural Australians	
Best Casting for a TVC	Antonia Murphy	KFC "Shut Up and Take My Money" Series	
Best Casting for a TVC	Stevie Ray	Audible	
Best Casting for a TVC	Joseph Wijangco	Carefree – "You Know"	
Best Casting for a TVC	Joseph Wijangco	"The Big Deal" – Marriage Equality	

== Sirius Award ==
The Sirius Award was created to recognise the top ten emerging actors from Australia. It was modelled on the Berlin Film Festival's Shooting Stars initiative. In 2015 Mark Coles Smith and Odessa Young won the award. In 2016 the Sirius Award was given to Katherine Langford and Jacob Collins Levy.

- 2015 nominees: Thomas Cocquerel, Rahel Romahn, Olivia De-Jonge, Odessa Young, Mark Coles Smith, Benedict Hardie, Andrea Demetriades, Alexander England, Abbey Lee, Zahra Newman

== See also ==
- List of television awards
