= Richard Brancatisano =

Australian actor and musician (born 1983)

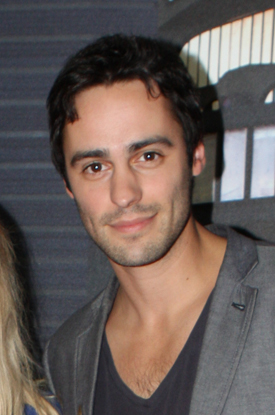
- Brancatisano at the Star Trek Into Darkness Australian premiere, 2013
- Born: Richard Peter Brancatisano; 29 October 1983 (age 42); Sydney, New South Wales, Australia
- Education: The King's School, Parramatta; Theatre Nepean
- Occupations: Actor, singer
- Years active: 2002–present
- Known for: Power Rangers Mystic Force; The Elephant Princess; Home and Away; Underbelly: Razor

Richard Peter Brancatisano (born 29 October 1983), also known by his stage name Richie Branco, is an Australian television actor and musician, best known for his roles as Xander Bly, the Green Mystic Ranger, in Power Rangers: Mystic Force and Dominic Russo on the ABC Family drama series, Chasing Life.

== Early life and education ==
Brancatisano was born in Sydney to a Calabrese-Italian father and an Australian mother. His interest in the dramatic arts began at an early age, and he appeared in several musicals and plays at his high school, The King' School in Parramatta.

He studied acting for three years at Sydney's Theatre Nepean.

== Career ==
=== Acting ===
Brancatisano played Corey in the 2005 season of Boyband: The Musical, staged by Ricochet Working Productions, which premiered at Sydney's Seymour Centre. It opened a return season in 2006, but he did not reprise the role. He also performed in the theatre production Vin, as the lead character, Vin.

In 2006, he came to prominence portraying Xander Bly, the Green Mystic Ranger in the children's series Power Rangers Mystic Force.

He next appeared as Caleb in the second season of the international children's TV series The Elephant Princess and as Prince Vittorio Secca in Home and Away. He had previously appeared twice, in the latter series. He had roles in Underbelly: Razor (the 2011 fourth season of anthology series Underbelly), White Collar Blue and Forensic Investigators. He also played a doctor, Rick, on the adventure drama series Reef Doctors, alongside Lisa McCune.

In 2013, Brancatisano secured his first American role in the drama series Chasing Life (an adaptation of a Mexican television series) after the pilot, Terminales (its previous name) was given the green light by America's ABC network. He played Dominic, the male lead. The same year, he played Rhys in the third season of Dance Academy.

Brancatisano was the main protagonist in the 2015 big screen adaptation of the hit Australian stage play Alex & Eve, written by Alex Lykos – a modern take on Romeo and Juliet. Directed by Peter Andrikidis, it depicted a synchronous multicultural dating landscape between a Greek Orthodox Alex and a Muslim Lebanese Eve, played by Andrea Demetriades. The film also starred Tony Nikolakopoulos, Zoe Carides and George Kapiniaris.

In 2022, Brancatisano appeared in miniseries After the Verdict as Dom, and in feature film Carmen as Pablo. The same year, he played Michael Sleiman in drama series The Twelve.

=== Music ===
In music circles, Brancatisano uses his stage name, 'Richie Branco'.

He played in a four-member indie rock covers band called Black Diamond Hearts, followed by a band called Flux.

He toured with New Zealand artist, Gin Wigmore.

He released his debut single "Fight Me" on 10 July 2018. He later released a single titled "Don’t Hold Your Love In".

=== Public appearances ===
Brancatisano was one of the guests of the Power Morphicon, the first Power Rangers convention, in Los Angeles in June 2007 and August 2014.

He also appeared at the 2023 Supanova Expo, a comic and gaming convention in Melbourne.

== Filmography ==
=== Film ===
Year	Title	Role	Notes
2006	This Girl in the Desert	Horned Man	Short film
2009	Whiteline	Thommo	Short film
2009	Cupid	Cupid	Short film
2011	Things to Do	Pete	Short film
2012	Bait 3D	Rory	Feature film
2015	Hamish Anderson: Little Lies	Talk Show Host	Video short
2015	Alex & Eve	Alex	Feature film

=== Television ===
Year	Title	Role	Notes
2003	White Collar Blue	Darcy Worth	Episode: "2.2"
2004	Double the Fist	Gate Terrorist	Episode: "Terrorism"
2006	Power Rangers Mystic Force	Xander Bly/Green Mystic Ranger	Main role
2007	Power Rangers Operation Overdrive	Xander Bly / Green Mystic Ranger	Episodes: "Once a Ranger: Parts 1 & 2"
2007	Home and Away	Theo Barrett	1 episode
2010	Home and Away	Prince Vittorio Seca	Recurring role
2011	The Elephant Princess	Caleb	Main role, season 2
2011	Underbelly: Razor	Guido Calletti	Main role
2012	Dripping in Chocolate	Saxon Blake	TV film
2013	Reef Doctors	Dr. Rick D'Alessandro	Main role
2013	Dance Academy	Rhys O'Leary	Recurring role
2014–2015	Chasing Life	Dominic Russo	Main role
2016	Struggling Servers	Actor	Episode: "The Coach"
2018	Olivia: Hopelessly Devoted to You	Matt Lattanzi	Miniseries
2018–2019	Harrow	Sgt. Gabriel Capello	2 episodes
2022	After the Verdict	Dom	6 episodes
2023	The Messenger	Joe	2 episodes
2024	Critical Incident	Theo Leon	3 episodes

== Theatre ==
Year	Title	Role	Notes	Ref.
2002	Hearts and Diamonds	King of Diamonds		
2004	The Wind in the Willows	Ratty		
2005	Boyband: The Musical	Corey	Seymour Centre, Sydney with Ricochet Working Productions	
2005	Vin	Vin		
