= Zoe Carides =

Australian actress

- Born: 19 February 1962 (age 64); Sydney, Australia
- Occupation: Actress
- Years active: 1986–present
- Children: 1
- Relatives: Gia Carides (sister); Danielle Carides (sister)

Zoe Carides (Greek: Ζωή Καρίδη, romanized: Zoí Karídi; born 19 February 1962) is an Australian actress of film and television, who is best known for her roles in Death in Brunswick as Sophie, G. P. as Dr. Sonia Kapek and Grass Roots as Liz Murray.

== Family ==
Carides was born in Sydney, Australia .

She has a daughter. Her sister is actress Gia Carides who also appeared in Police Rescue. Her brother-in-law was actor Anthony LaPaglia.

== Career ==
Carides has made cameos in many successful Australian television shows, such as All Saints, Acropolis Now, White Collar Blue, Crownies, Janet King, Rake, and Top of the Lake: China Girl.

Carides appeared in the 1980s advertisement for the State Bank of Victoria where, as she sits in her bed with her partner, she turns and says "it's your money, Ralph". This saying became part of the Australian lexicon for many years with people quoting it when talking about any monetary issue.

In 1986 Carides worked as a presenter on the ABC magazine style television show Edge of the Wedge

Carides' first major role was the 1991 film Death in Brunswick as the love interest of Sam Neill's lead character. She also went on to star in Brilliant Lies, which won her an AFI nomination, The Kiss and Police Rescue. She also starred in the independent Australian production of Beware of Greeks Bearing Guns.

After turning 40, Carides set two goals: to have a solo exhibition of her paintings and to record an album of her own music.

In 2005, Carides starred in the Sydney Theatre Company's Influence, by David Williamson, for which she won a Helpmann Award. In 2008, she played the part of Pia Jones in the BBC-commissioned Australian soap opera Out of the Blue.

She has also directed two short films: Gifted in 2005, and Not even a Mouse in 2011.

In 2015, Carides appeared in the film Alex & Eve, which was based on the Australian play by Alex Lykos. She plays Chloe, the mother of Greek Alex (played by Richard Brancatisano), who falls in love with Muslim Lebanese Eve (played by Andrea Demetriades).

She released an album of self-written songs, When I was Little, in 2018.

== Filmography ==
=== Film ===
Year	Title	Role	Type
1985	Chunk - Cut the Cheese		Film Short
1986	Face the Day		Film Short
1986	With Inertia		Film Short
1988	Kadaicha (aka Stones of Death)	Gail Sorensen	Feature film
1991	Death in Brunswick	Sophie Papafogos	Feature film
1992	Mad Bomber in Love	Rebecca	Feature film
1992	Seeing Red	Red Sessions	Feature film
1993	Shotgun Wedding	Helen Llewellyn	Feature film
1994	Police Rescue	Constable Lorrie 'Flash' Gordon	Feature film
1994	Gino	Lucia Petri	Feature film
1994	Fuckwit	Shannon	Film Short
1996	Brilliant Lies	Katy Connor	Feature film
1998	The Kiss	Sue	Film Short
1998	The Picture Woman	Travelling Woman	Film Short
1998	Something Honest		Film Short
1999	Midas	Narrator	Film Short
2000	Sammy Blue		Film Short
2000	Beware of Greeks Bearing Guns	Nicki	Feature film
2005	Gifted	Writer	Film Short
2008	The Black Balloon	Russell's Mum	Feature film
2010	Good As New	Mum	Film Short
2011	The Last Time I Saw Michael Gregg	Lisa Bacon	Video
2011	I Spy	Jo	Film Short
2011	Throw Away the Key	6 Minutes Journalist	Film Short
2011	Family Values	Mum	Film Short
2012	Not Suitable for Children	Lab Technician	Feature film
2013	Mystery Road	Shirley	Feature film
2013	Blinder	Ally	Feature film
2013	The Kiss	Woman	Film Short
2014	The Little Death (aka A Funny Kind of Love)	Doctor Barnes	Feature film
2014	Surviving Bug	Sue	Film Short
2014	Grace Under Water	Lou	Film Short
2015	Airlock	Leanne Ashbrook	
2015	Alex & Eve	Chloe	Feature film
2016	The Veiled	Maria	Film Short
2016	Science Fiction Volume One: The Osiris Child	Rominja	Feature film
2017	Event Zero	Pamela Laird	Feature film
2017	Red Handed	Female Voiceover (voice)	Film Short
2018	Final Resting Place	Mum	Film Short
2018	Trigger Happy	Belinda the DOP	Film Short
2018	Hot Mess	Loz's Mum	Feature film
2019	A Remarkable Career	Interviewer	Film Short
2020	Charging	Premier	Film Short
2022	Interceptor	President Wallace	Netflix Feature film

=== Television ===
Year	Title	Role	Type
1985	Out There	Presenter	TV series
1986	Edge of the Wedge	Herself	TV series, 1 episode
1986	Game of Life	Herself	TV series
1986	Studio 86		TV series, 2 episodes: "Strawberry Girl" & "Sisters in the Bathroom"
1987	Rafferty's Rules	Janine Tate	TV series, 1 episode
1988	The Insiders (Your First Tax Return)	Narrator	Video documentary
1988	Richmond Hill		TV series, 2 episodes
1988	The Tourist (aka Sands of Bedouin)		TV movie
1989	Rafferty's Rules	Mardi	TV series, 1 episode
1989	E Street	Jill Pritchard	TV series, 2 episodes
1989	Acropolis Now	Stella Hatzidimitropoulos	TV series, episode: "The Proxy Blues"
1990	The Flying Doctors	Mandy Sinclair	TV series, episode 20: "Life Line"
1991	The Midday Show	Guest (with Sam Neill)	TV series, 1 episode
1991	Tonight Live with Steve Vizard	Guest	TV series, 1 episode
1992	Andrew Denton: Live and Sweaty	Guest	TV series, 1 episode
1993	For Whose Sake?	Presenter	Film documentary
1993	A Current Affair	Herself	TV series, 1 episode
1993; 1994	Review	Guest Presenter	TV series, 1 episode
1993	Ray Martin at Midday	Guest	TV series, 1 episode
1993-2001	Good Morning Australia	Guest	TV series, 7 episodes
1993	People's Choice Awards	Presenter	TV special
1994	Police Rescue In Action	Constable Lorrie 'Flash' Gordon	TV movie
1994; 1995	Review	Herself	TV series, 2 episodes
1994	Midday with Derryn Hinch	Guest	TV series, 1 episode
1994	At Home	Guest	TV series, 1 episode
1994	What's Cooking	Guest	TV series, 1 episode
1994	Heartland	Shelley	TV series, 2 episodes
1994	Ernie and Denise	Guest	TV series, 1 episode
1994	Level 23	Herself	TV series, 1 episode
1994; 1995	Review - A.F.I. Awards	Herself	TV special
1995	The 37th Annual TV Week Logie Awards	Presenter	TV special
1995	Sale of the Century	Contestant	TV series, 3 episodes: "Cinema"
1995-96	G.P.	Dr. Sonia Kapek	TV series, 35 episodes
1995	Eleven AM	Guest	TV series, 1 episode
1995	Ten News	Herself	TV series, 1 episode
1995	National Nine News	Herself	TV series, 1 episode
1995	Seven Nightly News	Herself	TV series, 1 episode
1995	ABC News	Herself	TV series, 1 episode
1995	Roy and HG	Guest	TV series, 1 episode
1995	Review with Myles Barlow	Herself	TV series, 1 episode
1996	Midday with Kerri-Anne	Guest (with Gia Carides)	TV series, 1 episode
1996	Monday to Friday	Guest	TV series, 1 episode
1996	World Vision Appeal: A Christmas Wish	Herself	TV special
1997	War of Distance	Narrator	TV film documentary
1997	Good Guys Bad Guys	Skye Rinker	TV series, 2 episodes: "1.8 Million Reasons to Change Your Name Part 1" & "1.8 Million Reasons to Change Your Name Part 2"
1997	Bohemian Rhapsody	Herself	TV special
1998	Good News Week	Guest	TV series, 1 episode
1998	Good News Weekend	Guest	TV series, 2 episodes
1998	What's Cooking	Guest	TV series, 1 episode
1998	Wildside	Karen Begbie	TV series, 1 episode: "1.32"
1999	Murder Call	Dr. Constance Young	TV series, season 3, episode 7: "A Blow to the Heart"
1999	Dog's Head Bay	Pauline	TV series, 1 episode: "The Birthday Boy"
2000	Denise	Guest	TV series, 1 episode
2000	The 10.30 Slot	Guest	TV series, 1 episode
2000-01	All Saints	Sarah Adams	TV series, 5 episodes
2000-03	Grass Roots	Liz Murray	TV series, 18 episodes
2001	My Husband, My Killer	Lydia Lurman	TV movie
2002	White Collar Blue	Mrs. Zenopoulos	TV series, 1 episode: "1.7"
2003	Lucy	Lolita De Acha	TV movie
2004	Fireflies	Kim Porter	TV series, 1 episode: "Sons and Lovers"
2006	Monarch Cove	Guest role: Justine	TV series, 2 episodes: "1.11" & "1.12"
2006	All Saints	Jilly Winters	TV series, season 9, episode 3: "Moment of Faith"
2007	Back Seat	Beverly	TV short
2008	All Saints	Sandra Dyer	TV series, season 11, episode 6: "Careful What You Wish For"
2008	Out of the Blue	Pia Jones	TV series, 58 episodes
2009	The Cut	Goth Skater (voice)	TV miniseries, episode 5: "A Falcon's Tail"
2010	The Pacific	Mama Karamanlis	TV miniseries, episode 3: "Melbourne"
2010	Packed to the Rafters	Penny Mallory	TV series, 1 episode: "When Worlds Collide"
2010	Cops LAC	Alison Bristow	TV series, 1 episode: "Old Love"
2011	Crownies	Gillian Warden	TV series, 2 episodes: "1.16" & "1.18"
2012	Event Zero	Pamela	TV series, 1 episode
2013	Camp	Guidance Counselor	TV series, 1 episode
2013	The Real Mary Poppins	Herself	TV special
2014	Janet King	Gillian Warden	TV series, 3 episodes
2014	Old School	Carmen Gabban	TV miniseries, 1 episode
2015	Airlock	Leanne Ashbrook	TV series
2015	Ready for This	Principal Hardy	TV series, 1 episode
2016	Rake	Josephine	TV series, 1 episode
2016-19	Doctor Doctor	Nancy Miller / Jill / Mayor Miller	TV series, 9 episodes
2016	The Daily Edition	Guest	TV series, 1 episode
2017	Top of the Lake	Sylvia	TV series, 1 episode
2017	Pulse	Lucia	TV series, 1 episode
2017	Home and Away	Dr. Lang	TV series, 1 episode
2019	The Daily Edition	Guest	TV series, 1 episode
2019	The Commons	Dr. Carras	TV miniseries, 1 episode
2020	Reckoning	Sue	TV miniseries, 3 episodes
2020	Deadhouse Duck	Rosemary	TV miniseries, 1 episode
2021	Arguments with My Mum		TV series, 1 episode
2022	The PM's Daughter	Michaela Keane	TV miniseries, 1 episode
2022	Pieces of Her	Francine	TV series, 1 episode
2025	The Last Anniversary		TV series, 1 episode

== Theatre ==
Year	Title	Role	Type
1988	Blood Brothers	Linda	York Theatre
1989	Greek Tragedy		Company B Belvoir Street Theatre
2005	Influence		David Williamson for Sydney Theatre Company
