= Catalyst (1990 TV program) =

Australian science and technology television series (1990)

Catalyst is an Australian science and technology television series for teenagers broadcast by the ABC in 1990. It was written and directed by Margaret Wertheim, was hosted by Kaarin Fairfax and featured Mandy Salomon and Peter Rowsthorn. It was designed to make science "approachable" and featured music from Paul Kelly and The Models.

Deborah Smith in the Sydney Morning Herald writes "But science could take on a much trendier image if Catalyst, an imaginative and much-needed six-part science series for teenagers starting today on ABC TV, becomes popular in schools." In the Age Mark Lawrence said "Catalyt's stated goal is to show that "you can be good at science and also be young, hip, and have a sense of humor". On the of episode One, it works well." Research and education commentator Peter Pockley wrote in the Sydney Morning Herald that it was "quite brilliant in conception and execution — the best TV show for post-primary age groups I've seen anywhere."
