= Julian Maroun =

Australian actor

- Born: Julian Maroun
- Occupation: Actor
- Years active: 2015–present
- Television: Fighting Season, Romper Stomper

Julian Maroun is an Australian actor, best known for his roles as Corporal Peter "Pepsi" Abboud in Fighting Season and Farid in Logie Award-winning miniseries Romper Stomper.

== Early life ==
Maroun's parents were born in Lebanon.

== Career ==
Maroun's first acting role was in a pilot version (created for network distribution) of The Horizon in 2015, which as of October 2019 was the most watched online series made in Australia and the most watched LGBTQI web series in the world. His first Australian television role was in Catching Milat in 2015, directed by Peter Andrikidis.

In 2015, Maroun starred in and co-produced his debut short film with best friend Joseph Chebatte, Three Hearts, which was nominated at the Dances with Films festival in Los Angeles, screening at the Chinese Theatre Hollywood.

He played supporting roles in Australian television shows Cleverman, Janet King and Girt by Fear, before a major dual role as twin brothers Haris and Amir Rexhaj in Deep Water, with Yael Stone and Noah Taylor in 2016.

In 2017, Maroun was given leading roles in the Logie Award-winning miniseries Romper Stomper (with David Wenham, Lachy Hulme, Sophie Lowe) and the Foxtel/Goalpost series Fighting Season (with Jay Ryan, Ewen Leslie, Kate Mulvany), as well as a supporting role in international feature film Slam opposite Adam Bakri in 2018.

In 2018, Maroun and Chebatte produced their second short film, Entrenched, starring Maroun and Toby Wallace, about four Australian soldiers in Afghanistan who capture a young boy.

Maroun appeared in the first episode of the first series of the 2019 ABC series Diary of an Uber Driver. He played Harry in all six episodes of Season 2 of Aftertaste in 2022.

In 2024, Maroun appeared as Mohamed Fahmy in the 2024 film The Correspondent, along with Richard Roxburgh as the journalist Peter Greste based on true events surrounding his arrest in Egypt in 2013. Also in 2024, he appeared in season 3 of ABC drama Total Control (TV series).

== Filmography ==
=== Television ===
Year	Title	Role	Notes	Ref
2015	Catching Milat	Paymaster		
2015	Meat	Jimmy		
2016	Cleverman	Anton		
2016	Girt by Fear	Nema		
2016	Deep Water	Harris/Amir (twin brothers)		
2017	Janet King	Tyler Parati		
2018	Romper Stomper	Farid		
2018	Fighting Season	Corporal Peter "Pepsi" Abboud		
2018	The Horizon	Kasim / Kass	Pilot episode	
2019	Diary of an Uber Driver	Moe		
2021	Harrow	Aaron Sharpe	1 episode	
2021	Mr Inbetween	Harris	1 episode	
2021	Australian Gangster	Detective	1 episode	
2021	Home and Away	Detective Darren Nasser	6 episodes	
2022	The Secrets She Keeps	Carlos	6 episodes	
2022	Aftertaste	Harry	6 episodes	
2023	Year Of	Narrator	1 episode	
2024	Total Control	Constable Pollard	Season 3 1 episode	
2024	Ladies in Black	Elias	6 episodes	

=== Film ===
Year	Title	Role	Notes	Ref
2015	Gods of Egypt	Young Soldier		
2015	Three Hearts	Dean	Producer (short film)	
2018	Entrenched	John	Producer (short film)	
2019	Slam	Omar		
2020	Mother Dearest	N/A	Producer (short film)	
2021	The Fourth Wall	Actor		
2022	Mia & Me: Hero of Centopia	King Nino		
2022	Transfusion	Jerome		
2024	The Correspondent	Mohamed Fahmy		
