= List of awards and nominations received by Doctor Doctor =

Doctor Doctor awards and nominations
Awards and nominations
Award	Wins	Nominations
AACTA Awards	0	3
Casting Guild of Australia	0	1
Logie Awards	0	17
Screen Producers Australia	0	3
TV Tonight Awards	0	5

Totals (Note: Certain award groups do not simply award one winner. They acknowledge several different recipients, have runners-up, and have third place. Since this is a specific recognition and is different from losing an award, runner-up mentions are considered wins in this award tally. For simplification and to avoid errors, each award in this list has been presumed to have had a prior nomination.)
- Wins: 0
- Nominations: 29
- Honours: 2

Doctor Doctor is an Australian drama series that premiered on Nine Network on 16 September 2016. It is known internationally as The Heart Guy.

The series, including its cast, have been nominated for several awards including the AACTA Awards, the Casting Guild of Australia, the Screen Producers Australia, and multiple nominations at the Logie Awards. Despite multiple nominations, the series has not been the recipient of any awards. The series itself has been nominated for eleven awards, while Rodger Corser has been nominated for ten awards. In addition, Corser's character was honoured as part of an official list consisting of the 100 Greatest Australian TV Characters, published by TV Week.

== Award nominations ==
Award	Year	Category	Nominee(s)	Result	Ref
AACTA Awards	2017 (Note: AACTA Award nomination – for Best Guest or Supporting Actress in a Television Drama – Season 1)	Best Guest or Supporting Actress in a Television Drama	Tina Bursill	Nominated	
AACTA Awards	2018 (Note: AACTA Award nomination – for Best Lead Actress in a Television Drama – Season 2)	Best Lead Actress in a Television Drama	Tina Bursill	Nominated	
AACTA Awards	2020 (Note: AACTA Award nomination – for Best Television Drama Series – Season 4)	Best Television Drama Series	Doctor Doctor	Nominated	
Casting Guild of Australia	2016 (Note: Casting Guild of Australia Award nomination – for Best Casting in a TV Drama – Season 1)	Best Casting in a TV Drama	Kirsty McGregor	Nominated	
Logie Awards	2017 (Note: Logie Award nominations 2017 – for Season 1)	Gold Logie Award for Most Popular Personality on Australian Television	Rodger Corser	Nominated	
Logie Awards	2017	Logie Award for Best Actor	Rodger Corser	Nominated	
Logie Awards	2017	Logie Award for Most Outstanding Actor	Rodger Corser	Nominated	
Logie Awards	2017	Logie Award for Most Outstanding Supporting Actor	Ryan Johnson	Nominated	
Logie Awards	2017	Logie Award for Best New Talent	Shalom Brune-Franklin	Nominated	
Logie Awards	2017	Logie Award for Best Drama Program	Doctor Doctor	Nominated	
Logie Awards	2018 (Note: Logie Award nominations 2018 – for Season 2)	Gold Logie Award for Most Popular Personality on Australian Television	Rodger Corser	Nominated	
Logie Awards	2018	Logie Award for Most Popular Actor	Rodger Corser	Nominated	
Logie Awards	2018	Logie Award for Most Outstanding Actor	Rodger Corser	Nominated	
Logie Awards	2018	Logie Award for Most Popular Drama Program	Doctor Doctor	Nominated	
Logie Awards	2018	Logie Award for Most Outstanding Drama Series	Doctor Doctor	Nominated	
Logie Awards	2019 (Note: Logie Award nominations 2019 – for Season 3)	Gold Logie Award for Most Popular Personality on Australian Television	Rodger Corser	Nominated	
Logie Awards	2019	Logie Award for Most Popular Actor	Rodger Corser	Nominated	
Logie Awards	2019	Logie Award for Most Popular Drama Program	Doctor Doctor	Nominated	
Logie Awards	2019	Logie Award for Most Outstanding Drama Series	Doctor Doctor	Nominated	
Logie Awards	2022	Most Popular Actor	Roger Corser	Nominated	
Logie Awards	2022	Most Popular Drama Program	Doctor Doctor	Nominated	
Screen Producers Australia	2017 (Note: SPA Award nomination – for Easy Tiger Productions – Season 1)	SPA Award for Drama Series Production of the Year	Easy Tiger Productions	Nominated	
Screen Producers Australia	2019 (Note: SPA Award nomination – for Easy Tiger Productions – Season 3)	SPA Award for Drama Series Production of the Year	Easy Tiger Productions	Nominated	
Screen Producers Australia	2022 (Note: SPA Award nomination – for Easy Tiger Productions – Season 4)	SPA Award for Drama Series Production of the Year	Easy Tiger Productions	Nominated	
TV Tonight Awards	2017 (Note: TV Tonight nominations – for Best New Show and Best Australian Drama – Season 1)	TV Tonight Award for Best New Show (Australian)	Doctor Doctor	Nominated	
TV Tonight Awards	2017	TV Tonight Award for Best Australian Drama	Doctor Doctor	Nominated	
TV Tonight Awards	2018 (Note: TV Tonight nominations – for Best Australian Drama and Favourite Male – Season 2)	TV Tonight Award for Best Australian Drama	Doctor Doctor	Nominated	
TV Tonight Awards	2018	TV Tonight Award for Favourite Male	Rodger Corser	Nominated	
TV Tonight Awards	2019 (Note: TV Tonight nomination – for Best Australian Drama – Season 3)	TV Tonight Award for Best Australian Drama	Doctor Doctor	Nominated	

== Honours ==
Honour	Year	Character	Result	Ref
TV Week 100 Greatest Australian TV Characters	2023	Hugh Knight	34th place	
TV Week 70 Best Australian TV Shows of All Time	2026	Doctor Doctor	44th place	
