= Mandy Salomon =

Australian comedian

- Education: Swinburne University of Technology
- Occupations: Comedian, TV presenter, game designer, entrepreneur
- Notable work: MentiaCompanion, CarePlay

Mandy Salomon is a former Australian comedian. Following studies in dementia and a PhD on digital engagement, she has co-developed an educational game for use by people in care homes and their caregivers.

In 1983 Salomon, with Larry Buttrose and Judy Barnsley, started running The Gap, a cabaret club at the Sydney Trade Union Club. There she performed in the live soap opera 111 Foveaux, With the Gap team featured in Opera, Opera at the Downstairs Theatre at Belvoir Street in 1985.

She compered and performed in the show Characters which had return seasons as Characters II! and Characters 3. First appearing at The Gap in February 1984 it was created to showcase women in comedy. Comics featured include Salomon and her sister Melanie, Julie McCrossin, Angela Moore, Pam Brown, Mary-Anne Fahey, Wendy Harmer, Gretel Killeen, Victoria Roberts and Sue Ingleton

She performed shows as characters Fiona Smout, Modesta Bosomiani, Joan Rogers and Meg Bryson at ID's Supper Club in 1986, compered and performed in Three Wasps and a Dingo at the Harold Park Hotel in 1988 and played Joan Kirner in the one woman show Karry on Kirner in 1991

She has been a writer on Fast Forward and Tonight Live with Steve Vizard and featured in the ABC TV series Catalyst. She was a TV presenter in Out There in 1985 and on Edge of the Wedge in 1986.

Together with her sister Margot she created a documentary for SBS titled The Bidding Game on the real estate game.

In 2016, Salomon graduated from Swinburne University of Technology with a PhD for her thesis, "Expressing 'Self' in a virtual world: Digital engagement for people with moderate to severe dementia".
