= Shotgun Wedding (1993 film) =

- Directed by: Paul Harmon
- Starring: Aden Young; Zoe Carides; John Clayton
- Production company: David Hannay Productions
- Distributed by: Beyond Films
- Release date: 1993
- Running time: 95 minutes
- Country: Australia
- Language: English
- Budget: A$4,141,485
- Box office: A$4,794 (Australia)

Shotgun Wedding is a 1993 Australian film based on the Wally Mellish siege. Directed by Paul Harmon, it stars Aden Young and Zoe Carides. The 1996 film Mr. Reliable was also based on the same story.

== Plot summary ==
Jimmy (Aden Young), recently released from prison, has just married Helen (Zoe Carides). She finds out she is pregnant and the two move from the city to a country farmhouse. It is revealed that Jimmy got out of jail early because he gave evidence about a stolen car racket fronted by a corrupt police officer, Frank Taylor. One morning, Taylor arrives at the house and begins violently kicking in the door, threatening the two of them. Jimmy brandishes a shotgun in response, firing a warning shot at the door. Realising he has a woman in the house, Taylor is reluctant to shoot back, and Helen vocally exaggerates the danger she is in to make him back off. More police cars turn up as the situation evolves into a siege.

Helen's water breaks, and she demands to be taken to a hospital. Jimmy's shotgun runs out of ammo, so he destroys a car with an army surplus grenade launcher instead. Word of the siege begins to spread, and the media turn up to the house en masse. Helen begins to go into contractions. During a live radio interview, Jimmy tells the audience that police corruption has put him in this situation as he was set up by an officer to give evidence against another officer.

A doctor from the local hospital enters to help Helen give birth, accompanied by Officer Church. Jimmy is locked out of Helen's room, and bangs on the door furiously as she successfully gives birth. Church then insists that Jimmy hand him over the weapon and that Helen be allowed to go to hospital, but Jimmy replies, "This is our home. We don't need any more cops telling us what to do. Thank you and piss off." However, he mentions to Church that he and Helen wish to get married. Public support then grows for Jimmy and Helen, and a marriage ceremony is held inside the house.

Commissioner Hunter attempts to negotiate further with Jimmy but is made to strip naked and leave the house in front of media. The police then decide to turn public support against him, spreading a narrative that "negotiations have broken down." That night, they shine floodlights into the house and throw rocks on the roof. In the morning, Jimmy begins to snap and tells Helen to leave, threatening her and the child with the gun. He comes out of the house holding a gun to Helen's head, telling the police he will murder them both then leaving her outside. When the police begin to approach the house, he throws a dud grenade at them and Helen re-enters the house. A distraught Jimmy begins to contemplate suicide, pointing the gun in his mouth, but is wordlessly talked down by Helen who slaps him in the face and hands him their child.

Helen is finally released and Jimmy is arrested. Taylor approaches with gun drawn to shoot Billy, but is killed himself by another officer before he can fire. Helen drives off in a police car with the child and looks back at Jimmy, who places his hands above his head.

== Critical reception ==
David Stratton of The Movie Show gave Shotgun Wedding two-and-a-half stars, criticising the film's "uncertainty of tone" but praising the performances from the cast. Similarly, Michael Hutak of The Sydney Morning Herald complimented the "excellent" cast and crew but criticised "both director and script-writer, who forsake an opportunity to effectively replay the old truth-is-stranger-than-fiction routine in favour of a stagy sideshow stripped of realism." Paul Harmon, also of the Herald, praised the cast and in particular Young and Carides, calling them "two of our most talented young performers." However, he added that "few if any of these characters are sympathetic or warm, so it's hard to be more than superficially involved in the proceedings."

== Cast ==
- Aden Young as Jimmy Becker
- Zoe Carides as Helen Llewelyn
- John Clayton as Superintendent Church
- Bill Hunter as Police Commissioner Andrews
- John Walton as Detective Frank Taylor
- Sean Scully as Detective Craig Haker
- Marshall Napier as Dave Green
- Bud Tingwell as Gary Judge (voice)
- Sheila Kennelly as Voice
- Gary Waddell as Nightclub Spruiker
