= Out There (1985 TV series) =

Australian magazine style television show (1985)

Out There is a ABC magazine style television program for teenagers in Australia. Aimed partly at school leavers it ran in a Tuesday afternoon slot. Debuting on 19 March 1985 it was produced in alternative weeks in Melbourne and Sydney. In Melbourne the presenters were Richard Stubbs and Gina Riley, David Cotter and Ruth Darling. In Sydney it was Ian "Dano" Rogerson, Joy Smithers and Mandy Salomon. It was a reworked version of Class of '84 and kept presenters Rogerson and Smithers from that show.
