= Fovou tous Ellines =

Fovou tous Ellines (Beware of Greeks Bearing Guns)
- Australian movie poster
- Directed by: John Tatoulis
- Written by: Tom Galbraith; Lakis Lazopoulos
- Starring: Lakis Lazopoulos; Zoe Carides; Claudia Buttazzoni; John Bluthal
- Distributed by: Palace Films; Odeon
- Release dates: 2000 (Greece); 12 September 2002 (Australia)
- Running time: 85 minutes
- Countries: Australia; Greece
- Languages: English; Greek
- Box office: A$92,142 (Australia)

Fovou tous Ellines (also known as Beware of Greeks Bearing Guns) is a film directed by John Tatoulis. Filmed in Australia and the island of Crete, Greece it is a romantic comedy / drama that stars Lakis Lazopoulos alongside Zoe Carides, Claudia Buttazzoni and John Bluthal.

== Cast ==
- Lakis Lazopoulos as Manos and George
- Zoe Carides as Niki
- John Bluthal as Stephanos
- Claudia Buttazzoni as Katerina
- Damien Fotiou as Jim
- Tasso Kavadia as Maria
- Osvaldo Maione as Enzo
- Percy Sieff as Petros
- Ron Haddrick as Thomas
- Anastasia Malinof as Helen
- Noni Ioannidou as young Maria (1943–1971)
- Dimitris Kaperonis as young Manos (1971)
- Alexandros Kaperonis as young George (1971)
- Artemis Ionnides as young Nicki (1971)
- Nikos Psarras as young Vasilli (1943)
- Dimitris Kalantzis as young Stephanos (1943)

== Release ==
The film was highly popular in Greece.
