= Andrea Demetriades =

Australian actress

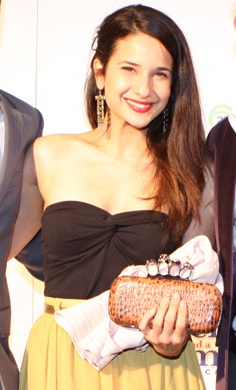
- Demetriades at the 2012 premiere of An Officer and a Gentleman, The Musical at the Sydney Lyric Theatre
- Born: Perth, Western Australia
- Education: Western Australian Academy of Performing Arts; Curtin University; National Institute of Dramatic Art (2006)
- Occupation: Actress
- Years active: 2006–present

Andrea Demetriades is an Australian actress. She is best known for playing lawyer Lina Badir in the ABC legal dramas Crownies (2011) and its spin-off Janet King (2014–2017), and Daisy Dixon in the ABC and BBC One series Return to Paradise (2024–present). On stage she has played Eliza Doolittle in Sydney Theatre Company's Pygmalion and leading roles for Bell Shakespeare, and won the 2016 Sydney Theatre Award for Best Female Actor in a Leading Role in an Independent Production for the title role in Sport for Jove's Antigone. She was nominated for the AACTA Award for Best Guest or Supporting Actress in a Television Drama in 2017 for Seven Types of Ambiguity, and shared Equity Ensemble Awards with the casts of that series and The Principal.In 2026, she won Best Actress at Zigguart FilmFest for her performance in the short film ''Opa-Pappou''.

== Early life and education ==
Demetriades was born in Perth, the youngest of four sisters. Her father emigrated from Cyprus in 1969 and worked as a Greek teacher and translator; her mother is an artist. Her father was a teacher and journalist who held several offices in Perth's organised Cypriot community after 1974. She grew up in Perth's Greek Cypriot community, and in the early 2000s she and Katina Pitsonis taught Cypriot and Greek dance to a group of 35 children through the Cyprus Community of Western Australia's Zephyrus Cyprus Dance Group. Historian Anastasios Tamis notes that she "later built a remarkable career as an actor".

She studied dance at the Western Australian Academy of Performing Arts and communications and cultural studies at Curtin University, before graduating from the National Institute of Dramatic Art (NIDA) with a Bachelor of Dramatic Art (Acting) in 2006.

== Career ==
=== Stage ===
After NIDA, Demetriades played Anna in Winter at Griffin Theatre Company, directed by Nick Marchand, and the title role in Helly's Magic Cup for the State Theatre Company of South Australia.

Demetriades played Marina in Bell Shakespeare's 2009 production of Pericles, directed by John Bell. Reviewing the production for the Herald Sun, Kate Herbert singled out the reunion between Marina and Pericles, played by Marcus Graham, as its most moving scene, and praised Demetriades' portrayal of Marina. Demetriades received a nomination for Female Supporting Performer at the 2009 Green Room Awards for the role.

In 2010, she played Viola in Bell Shakespeare's Australian touring production of Twelfth Night, directed by Lee Lewis. Reviewing the production for ArtsHub, Sarah Adams described Demetriades as a rising talent, highlighting her charisma and intelligence in the role. She was nominated for Best Actress at the 2010 Green Room Awards for her performance.

In 2012 she played Eliza Doolittle in Sydney Theatre Company's Pygmalion, directed by Peter Evans. Reviewing the production for Australian Stage, Augusta Supple wrote that she made Eliza's transformation from urchin to lady "with great finesse", while Diana Simmonds of StageNoise wrote that "the fortuitous casting of Andrea Demetriades is a winner" and singled out "the exquisitely effective Demetriades". She returned to the company in Perplex (2014) and as Raina in Arms and the Man (2015), and played Hannah Jarvis in Arcadia in 2016. Reviewing Arms and the Man for ArtsHub, Glen Falkenstein found her "fancifully fun as the young romantic" and wrote that she "carries the scenes", pulling off the comic role as well as she had Shaw's more dramatic Eliza. In Arcadia, Stage Whispers reviewer Sally Alrich-Smythe called her "the stand-out on the stage", adding: "Wherever the text offered tongue-in-cheek, Demetriades shone."

Between her Sydney Theatre Company roles she worked with Belvoir. In late 2013 she played Eliza in Neil Armfield's revival of The Book of Everything, Richard Tulloch's adaptation of Guus Kuijer's novel, presented by Belvoir and Kim Carpenter's Theatre of Image at Melbourne Theatre Company's Southbank Theatre. In 2014 she played Antigone opposite Peter Carroll's Oedipus in Adena Jacobs's Oedipus Rex in Belvoir's Downstairs Theatre, a reimagining of the blind king's last days that Jacobs created in collaboration with the two actors. Critic John Shand wrote that "Demetriades' Antigone is by turns practical, caring, teasing and cruel", and Lynne Lancaster of ArtsHub described "the darkly beautiful Andrea Demetriades". In 2015 she appeared with Benedict Hardie and Xavier Samuel in The Dog/The Cat, a double bill of short plays by Brendan Cowell and Lally Katz directed by Ralph Myers in Belvoir's Downstairs Theatre; she played Miracle, an academic courted by two men at a dog park, in Cowell's The Dog, and a newly separated woman sharing custody of the family cat with her ex-husband in Katz's The Cat. Australian Stage wrote that the trio performed with "an assured charm", AussieTheatre's Cassie Tongue found the cast "each instantly likable", and John Pollak of the Sydney Arts Guide wrote that "Andrea Demetriades is also darn good", adding: "The scene in which Demetriades seduces her lover in front of the Cat is wonderful." When Belvoir revived the double bill in 2017, Sheridan Harbridge took over the roles Demetriades had originated.

Later in 2016 she played the title role in Sport for Jove's Antigone at the Seymour Centre, directed by Damien Ryan and Terry Karabelas. Diana Simmonds of StageNoise wrote that she "wrenches hearts and provokes laughter by turn", and the performance won her the Sydney Theatre Award for Best Female Actor in a Leading Role in an Independent Production. The production won seven Sydney Theatre Awards in all, including Best Independent Production.

In 2019 she played Anna in Anatomy of a Suicide. In 2021 she played Judy, the 1950s-obsessed housewife at the centre of Laura Wade's Home, I'm Darling, for Sydney Theatre Company at the Drama Theatre of the Sydney Opera House; Stage Whispers reviewer David Spicer described her as "revelling as a domestic goddess". The production had been halted in rehearsal by the COVID-19 lockdowns of 2020.

In 2023 she played Catharine in Tennessee Williams's Suddenly, Last Summer at the Ensemble Theatre, directed by Shaun Rennie. StageNoise called her "a powerfully tragic yet optimistic presence", adding: "She's one of our best". In April and May 2026 she appeared as the Other Woman in Jez Butterworth's The River for Sydney Theatre Company, directed by Margaret Thanos, alongside Ewen Leslie and Miranda Otto. Suzy Wrong of Suzy Goes See wrote that she "delivers exceptional intensity in several exquisitely crafted dramatic set pieces".

=== Television ===
Demetriades made her television debut in All Saints in 2009. Her breakthrough came as Lina Badir, a Palestinian-Australian Muslim solicitor in the Office of the Director of Public Prosecutions, in the ABC legal drama Crownies (2011), a role she played across 22 episodes and reprised in its spin-off Janet King across three series from 2014 to 2017. Reviewing the first series of Janet King for Inside Story, Jane Goodall noted that the junior prosecutors' roles had been reworked, giving the actresses who played them, including Demetriades, more room to develop their characters.

She played Hafa Habeb in the SBS miniseries The Principal (2015), whose cast won the Equity Ensemble Award for a miniseries or telemovie. In 2017 she played Angela, a Turkish sex worker, opposite Alex Dimitriades in the ABC adaptation of Elliot Perlman's novel Seven Types of Ambiguity; the role earned her an AACTA Award nomination for Best Guest or Supporting Actress in a Television Drama, and the cast won the 2018 Equity Ensemble Award. The same year she played Dr Lou Tannis in the ABC medical drama Pulse, working with director Ana Kokkinos, who described her as "an explosive actress" and "a major talent". In 2018 she was cast in Murder, a pilot for CBS and Warner Bros.

She played Romi in the second series of the ABC comedy Squinters (2019), and went on to roles in The Commons (2019), the Foxtel drama The End (2020) and the American psychological thriller Reckoning (2020). In the 2021 SBS heist drama The Unusual Suspects she played Martha Drewe, a high-flying American chief executive, alongside Miranda Otto; filming took place under COVID-19 restrictions, with early rehearsals conducted behind shields. Her 2023 roles included Nikki Santos in the Seven Network miniseries The Claremont Murders, which was nominated for Best Miniseries or Telemovie at the 2024 Logie Awards, Marianne Cracksworth in the Disney+ series The Artful Dodger and Dee in the ABC revival of Mother and Son.

Since 2024 she has played Daisy Dixon in Return to Paradise, an ABC and BBC One spin-off of Death in Paradise filmed in the Illawarra. The series won the Logie Award for Best Drama Program in 2025, and its second series premiered in late 2025. She has since appeared as Jen in NCIS: Sydney (2025), Dr Bennett in The Last Anniversary (2025), Gia Pandit in the third series of The Twelve (2025) and Kat Pappas in the second series of High Country (2026).

=== Film ===
After early short films, Demetriades made her feature debut in 2013 with roles in Nerve.

In 2013, Demetriades appeared as Kate in Around the Block, an Australian drama film written and directed by Sarah Spillane. The film starred Christina Ricci and Hunter Page-Lochard, with a supporting cast that included Ruby Rose, Jack Thompson and Demetriades. Her character was a former romantic partner of Ricci's character, Dino Chalmers.

Her first leading film role came as Eve, a Lebanese Muslim lawyer who falls for a Greek Orthodox schoolteacher, in Peter Andrikidis's romantic comedy Alex & Eve (2015), co-starring Richard Brancatisano. Andrikidis spent six months casting the part before choosing her, and called her "truly an amazingly gifted actor; world class". Reviewing the film in 2017, American critic Dwight Brown wrote that "the leads, Brancatisano and Demetriades, give performances that are suitably enticing". Demetriades also co-directed the short film Latte e Miele (Milk and Honey) with actor Louisa Mignone, with whom she developed the concept; Mignone wrote the screenplay, and the pair starred as two Italian sisters who emigrate to rural Australia in the early 1950s after marrying men by proxy. Funded through a Pozible campaign and Metro Screen's First Breaks program, it screened at the Greek Film Festival in 2016.She later played Jenny in Shannon Murphy's Babyteeth (2019) and Clara in the anthology horror film Dark Whispers Volume 1 (2019).

Demetriades is listed among the cast of Fangs, a black comedy written and directed by Lucy McKendrick and starring Joel Edgerton and Toni Collette.

In the 2024 short drama film Opa-Pappou, written and directed by Katharina Keil, Demetriades portrayed Elena. The film explores family relationships, grief and cultural identity. For her performance, Demetriades won Best Actress at the 2026 Zigguart FilmFest, held online from 20 to 31 October 2026.

== Filmography ==
=== Film ===
Year	Title	Role	Notes
2009	Blind Date	Alexandra Divine	Short film
2010	Little Leopold	Carla	Short film
2013	Nerve	Helen White	Feature film
2013	Around the Block	Kate	Feature film
2013	Heidi Fires Everyone	Traci	Short film
2013	Invisible	Sarah	Short film
2014	The Little House	Grandmother	Short film
2014	Latte e Miele (Milk and Honey)	Liliana	Short film; also co-director
2015	Alex & Eve	Eve	Feature film
2017	Remembering Agatha	Agatha	Short film
2019	Babyteeth	Jenny	Feature film
2019	Dark Whispers: Volume 1	Clara	Feature film
2025	Candy Bar	Sophie	Short film
2025	Opa-Pappou	Elena	Short film
2026	Date 3	Ella's sister (voice)	Short film

The film and short-film credits through 2019 are listed in Demetriades' professional acting resume.

=== Television ===
Year	Title	Role	Notes
2009	All Saints	Felicity Summers	Guest appearance
2011	Crownies	Lina Badir	Main cast
2013	Mr & Mrs Murder	Lola Atkins	Guest appearance
2013	Miss Fisher's Murder Mysteries	Beatrice Mason	Guest appearance
2014-2017	Janet King	Lina Badir	Main cast
2015	The Principal	Hafa Habeb	Miniseries
2017	Seven Types of Ambiguity	Angela	Miniseries
2017	Pulse	Dr Lou Tannis	Main cast
2018-2019	Squinters	Romi	Recurring role
2018	Doctor Doctor	Dr Pari Thompson	Guest appearance
2018	Murder	Raquel Bennett	CBS television pilot; not a feature film
2019	Mr Black	Julia	Guest appearance
2019	The Commons	Karima Khan	Recurring role
2020	Reckoning	Valerie	Recurring role
2020	The End	Dr Phillippa Lee	Recurring role
2020	Black Comedy	Cherry	Series 4
2021	Amazing Grace	Chloe	Guest appearance
2021	The Unusual Suspects	Martha Drewe	Miniseries
2021	Clickbait	Audrey	Miniseries
2023	The Claremont Murders	Nikki Santos	Miniseries
2023	Mother and Son	Dee	Recurring role
2023	The Artful Dodger	Marianne Cracksworth	Guest appearance
2024–2025	Return to Paradise	Daisy Dixon	Main cast
2025	NCIS: Sydney	Jen	Guest appearance
2025	The Last Anniversary	Dr Bennett	Guest appearance
2025	The Twelve	Gia Pandit	Series 3
2026	High Country	Kat Pappas	Series 2

The television roles are documented in Demetriades' Showcast acting credits, which list production years as well as some later broadcast dates.

=== Web series ===
Year	Title	Role	Notes
2016	Fragments of Friday	Sascha	Recurring role
2016	Let's Talk About	Mary	Series 2

== Awards and nominations ==
Year	Award	Category	Work	Result
2009	Green Room Awards	Female Supporting Performer	Pericles	Nominated
2010	Green Room Awards	Best Actress	Twelfth Night	Nominated
2012	Equity Ensemble Awards	Outstanding Performance by an Ensemble in a Drama Series	Crownies	Nominated
2014	Equity Ensemble Awards	Outstanding Performance by an Ensemble in a Drama Series	Janet King	Nominated
2015	Casting Guild of Australia Rising Stars	Rising Star selection	-	Selected
2016	Glugs Theatrical Awards	Norman Kessell Memorial Award for Best Actress	Arms and the Man	Nominated
2016	Sydney Theatre Awards	Best Female Actor in a Leading Role in an Independent Production	Antigone	Won
2016	Equity Ensemble Awards	Outstanding Performance by an Ensemble in a Miniseries or Telemovie	The Principal	Won
2017	AACTA Awards	Best Guest or Supporting Actress in a Television Drama	Seven Types of Ambiguity	Nominated
2018	Equity Ensemble Awards	Outstanding Performance by an Ensemble in a Miniseries or Telemovie	Seven Types of Ambiguity	Won

|- | 2026 | Zigguart FilmFest | Best Actress | Opa-Pappou | Won
