= The Correspondent (film) =

2024 Australian legal thriller

- Theatrical poster
- Directed by: Kriv Stenders
- Screenplay by: Peter Duncan
- Based on: The First Casualty by Peter Greste
- Produced by: Carmel Travers
- Starring: Richard Roxburgh; Julian Maroun; Rahel Romahn; Yael Stone; Mojean Aria
- Cinematography: Geoffrey Hall
- Edited by: Veronika Jenet
- Music by: Tom Ellard
- Production company: Pop Family Entertainment
- Distributed by: Maslow Entertainment
- Release dates: 23 October 2024 (Adelaide Film Festival); 17 April 2025 (Australia)
- Running time: 159 minutes
- Country: Australia
- Language: English

The Correspondent is a 2024 biographical legal thriller directed by Kriv Stenders from a screenplay by Peter Duncan. The film stars Richard Roxburgh, Julian Maroun, Rahel Romahn, Yael Stone, and Mojean Aria. The plot focuses on Australian foreign correspondent and journalist Peter Greste, who was arrested in Cairo and held in an Egyptian prison for nearly two years, and is adapted from Greste's 2017 memoir The First Casualty.

The Correspondent had its world premiere at the Adelaide Film Festival on 23 October 2024, and was theatrically released in Australia on 17 April 2025.

== Synopsis ==
The film is based on the real-life story of Australian foreign correspondent and journalist Peter Greste, focusing on his arrest and imprisonment in Cairo after being accused of spreading false news and aiding the Muslim Brotherhood, when he was in Egypt as an Al Jazeera English journalist, reporting on events during unrest on the streets. The film includes flashbacks to Greste's earlier assignments, including one in Somalia, in which his friend and colleague Kate Peyton was deliberately shot and killed, while they were both working for the BBC.

== Cast ==
- Richard Roxburgh as Peter Greste
- Julian Maroun as Mohamed Fahmy
- Rahel Romahn as Baher Mohamed
- Yael Stone as Kate Peyton
- Mojean Aria as Alaa Abd El-Fattah
- Nic Cassim as Andrew Greste
- Fayssal Bazzi as Mansour
- Majid Shokor as Judge Nagy (Mohamed Nagy Shehata)
- Josh McConville as Karel Prinsloo
- Hazem Shammas as Major Sami
- Sarah Nader as Kali

== Production ==
The Correspondent is a legal thriller film directed by Kriv Stenders from a screenplay by Peter Duncan. The screenplay, written by Duncan, is adapted from Greste's 2017 memoir The First Casualty, which is subtitled A Memoir from the Front Lines of the Global War on Journalism.

Geoffrey Hall was responsible for the cinematography, and the film was produced by Carmel Travers.

The film wrapped production in March 2024, after six weeks of shooting in Sydney.

When discussing his performance, Roxburgh said he made no attempt to imitate Greste; instead he focused on "empathetically reaching into his experience as much as I could". He described the shoot as "gruelling and horrendous" due to the confined, claustrophobic nature of the story and production.

== Release ==
The first trailer was released on the 24 September 2024. The film had its world premiere on the opening night of the 2024 Adelaide Film Festival on 23 October. Greste, a special guest of the festival, appeared in a panel discussion with the filmmakers, and said that the film "paid huge respect" to his memoir.

The Correspondent was released by Maslow Entertainment in Australia on 17 April 2025, after initially having been scheduled on 26 December 2024.

It has been streamed on Netflix since 17 October 2025.

== Critical reception ==
On the review aggregator website Rotten Tomatoes, 100% of 10 critics' reviews are positive.

Luke Buckmaster, writing for The Guardian, gave the film 4 out of 5 stars, calling the film "an important story powerfully told", praising Roxburgh's performance and the cinematography by Geoffrey Hall. The Sydney Morning Herald also gave the film 4 stars out of 5, with reviewer Sandra Hall remarking that although Roxburgh does not resemble Greste physically at all, his "nervy intensity" works well in the role.

Screenhub's Stephen A. Russell wrote that the film stands tall on Roxburgh’s "capable shoulders even as it zips through the ordeal at a fair clip". Penelope Debelle, writing in InDaily, comments that Roxburgh's performance manages to encapsulate "Greste's unshowy character" and is "notably quiet... devoid of sentimentality and free of heroics". She also praised Duncan's "strong" screenplay.

The AU Review headlined its 3.5-star review "The Correspondent is a stark Australian thriller grounded by the understated work of Richard Roxburgh", and called the film "a thrilling, effective view of a truly ridiculous situation that had devastating consequences". Herald Sun reviewer Leigh Paatsch called it "a solidly engrossing recounting" of the case, and wrote "what ultimately lifts the movie above its scenic limitations is a nuanced lead performance from Richard Roxburgh".

Journalism lecturer Andrea Baker, writing for The Conversation, called it "skillfully directed... a film every journalist should see", because of its exposure of the risks and dangers of being a journalist. She sums up "The Correspondent is an extraordinary film about human resilience and the importance of global diplomacy in the ongoing fight for press freedom".
