= Pell Mell (play) =

1986 play by Melanie Salomon

- Original language: English
- Written by: Melanie Salomon
- Genre: Comedy
- Setting: Adelaide's Myrtle Bank

Premiere
- Date: 1986

Pell Mell is a one-person play by Australian actress and playwright Melanie Salomon that premiered in 1986. Starring Salomon and directed by Geoffrey Rush it was first staged at the Downstairs Theatre, Belvoir Street. Salomon plays multiple characters during the show telling a story of growing up in Adelaide in the '70s.

Bob Evans of the Sydney Morning Herald says "Unfortunately not all the characters who appear in the show have the same assurance and precision. But to her credit, Salomon has an unerring ear for the cadences and idiosyncrasies of speech and an enormous talent for behavioural imitations". In the Age Peter Weiniger writes "Salomon performs at a measured pace; hers is the comedy of observation tempered with reflection. She allows her characters to evolve gently, her humour is carefully controlled and full of insights and nuances."

Salomon won the 1987 AWGIE Award for Comedy Revue/Sketch for the show.
