= Edge of the Wedge (TV series) =

Australian magazine style television show (1986)

Edge of the Wedge was an Australian magazine style television show broadcast in 1986 by the ABC. It was aimed at a teenage audience and aired Mondays, Tuesdays and Wednesdays at 6pm with Tuesdays having a prime focus on music. Reporters and presenters included Mandy Salomon, David Wales, Tracee Hutchison, Greg Parke, Unjoo Moon, Mark Dodshon, Zoe Carides, Tracey Callander and Henry Pepper. It focused on Australian bands and youth culture and politics. They recorded live music footage from Australian pubs, some of which was later aired on The Noise. The show ended in October. The axing was then suspended pending survey of 15-25 year olds but results came back negative and the axing stood.

== See also ==
- List of Australian music television shows
- List of Australian television series
