= The Straits =

Australian television series

- Genre: Drama
- Developed by: Louis Nowra
- Written by: Louis Nowra; Blake Ayshford; Nick Parsons; Kristen Dunphy; Jaime Browne
- Directed by: Peter Andrikidis; Rachel Ward; Rowan Woods
- Starring: Aaron Fa'aoso; Brian Cox; Rena Owen; Firass Dirani; Jimi Bani; Emma Lung
- Country of origin: Australia
- Original language: English
- No. of seasons: 1
- No. of episodes: 10

Production
- Executive producers: Tony Ayres; Carole Sklan; David Ogilvy
- Producers: Penny Chapman; Helen Panckhurst
- Running time: 60 minutes
- Production company: Matchbox Pictures

Original release
- Network: ABC1
- Release: 2 February – 29 March 2012

The Straits is an Australian television drama series for ABC1 filmed in Cairns, the Torres Strait Islands and other Far North Queensland locations.

The series is based on an idea by actor Aaron Fa'aoso and produced by Penny Chapman and Helen Panckhurst from Matchbox Pictures. It is directed by Peter Andrikidis, Rachel Ward, and Rowan Woods. It is written by Louis Nowra, Blake Ayshford, Nick Parsons, Kristen Dunphy, and Jaime Browne. On 19 October 2012, it was announced that a second series would not be produced.

In December 2012, the show began airing exclusively on Hulu.

== Synopsis ==
The series follows the Montebello family, whose business involves smuggling drugs into Australia, and guns and exotic wildlife out, making use of ties of blood and loyalty in the Torres Strait Islands. When Harry Montebello, the head of the family, starts to plan his succession, he sparks a vicious family power struggle. While under attack from ambitious bikers and mercurial Papua New Guinea Raskol gangs, the family must hold together through torture, assassination, and imprisonment.

== Cast ==
- Brian Cox as Harry Montebello
- Rena Owen as Kitty Montebello
- Aaron Fa'aoso as Noel Montebello
- Firass Dirani as Gary Montebello
- Jimi Bani as Marou Montebello
- Suzannah Bayes-Morton as Sissi Montebello
- Emma Lung as Lola Montebello
- Kate Jenkinson as Antoinette Montebello
- Cramer Cain as Eddie
- Andy Anderson as Vince
- Kim Gyngell as Paddy
- Rachael Blake as Natasha
- James Mackay as Joel Thomson
- Jasper Bagg as Two Stroke
- Dan Wyllie as Jojo
- Malcolm Kennard as Inspector Sutherland
- Mark Hembrow as Ambrose

== Episodes ==
No.	Title	Directed by	Written by	Original release date
1	"The Proposition"	Peter Andrikidis	Nick Parsons	2 February 2012
2	"The Trouble With Raskols"	Peter Andrikidis	Nick Parsons, Jaime Browne	2 February 2012
3	"Yawor My Lovely"	Peter Andrikidis	Blake Ayshford	9 February 2012
4	"The Hunt For Vlad"	Rachel Ward	Blake Ayshford	16 February 2012
5	"Epiphanies"	Rachel Ward	Nick Parsons	23 February 2012
6	"The Price"	Rachel Ward	Blake Ayshford	1 March 2012
7	"Poison"	Rowan Woods	Kristen Dunphy	8 March 2012
8	"The Big Mistake"	Peter Andrikidis	Nick Parsons	15 March 2012
9	"Dead Reckoning"	Rowan Woods	Nick Parsons	22 March 2012
10	"Fatherhood"	Rowan Woods	Blake Ayshford	29 March 2012
