= Kate Peyton =

British journalist and senior producer

- Born: Katherine Mary Peyton; 13 December 1965; Bury St Edmunds, Suffolk, England
- Died: 9 February 2005 (aged 39); Mogadishu, Somalia
- Cause of death: Shot
- Education: Culford School
- Alma mater: University of Manchester
- Occupations: Journalist, freelance producer
- Employer: BBC

Katherine Mary Peyton (13 December 1965 – 9 February 2005) was a British journalist and senior producer for the BBC bureau in Johannesburg, South Africa, from 2002 to 2005. She was killed in a shooting incident in Somalia whilst reporting on that country's nascent peace process.

== Early life and education ==
Katherine Mary Peyton was born on 13 December 1965 in Bury St Edmunds, Suffolk. She was educated at Culford School and read civil engineering at Manchester University. However, while at university she found herself increasingly drawn to books and journalism, and resolved to make a career as a producer in broadcasting.

== Career ==
On leaving university Peyton got her first job at BBC Radio Suffolk, and also worked at Radio Merseyside and GMR. Her long-term ambition as a young radio producer was eventually to work in South Africa, a country she had first visited with her family in 1979.

She finally moved to South Africa to work in the 1990s, firstly for the South African Broadcasting Corporation and the BBC as a freelance producer. She was eventually appointed to the post of Africa producer for the BBC in the early 2000s. She covered many major stories, including the emerging AIDS crisis in South Africa, the Mozambique floods and the humanitarian emergency of Darfur.

=== Somalia ===
In February 2005, Peyton was warned by the BBC's Johannesburg bureau chief that there was concern over her perceived lack of focus. When she was asked to travel to Somalia to report on the situation there for the BBC World Service, she saw it as a chance to demonstrate her commitment and improve the chances of her contract being renewed.

On arrival in Mogadishu, Peyton, accompanied by Australian reporter Peter Greste, and checked into the Sahafi Hotel.

==== Murder and aftermath ====
Only a few hours later she was shot in the back while standing outside the hotel, which was popular with politicians and journalists. She underwent emergency surgery but died later the same day (9 February 2005) in the hospital. It was later found by the United Nations that her killing was likely organised by the Al-Qaeda-affiliated military leader, Aden Hashi Farah.

After Peyton's death, her family and friends raised questions over how much pressure to take on dangerous assignments was put on producers and reporters retained on short-term contracts. At the inquest into her death the coroner stated that while the BBC was not liable for Peyton's death, BBC managers had to recognise that staff had an overriding right to turn down dangerous jobs, regardless of any fears they might have for their future employment.

== In film ==
Peyton is played by Yael Stone in the 2024 Australian film The Correspondent, directed by Kriv Stenders. Her character is seen in a series of flashbacks, which include her murder, opposite Richard Roxburgh, who plays Peter Greste.

== See also ==
- BBC newsreaders and journalists
