= Pulse (Australian TV series) =

Australian television series

- Written by: Kris Wyld; Michael Miller; Kristen Dunphy; Mandy McCarthy
- Screenplay by: Paul Gerard Kennedy
- Directed by: Peter Andrikidis; Jennifer Leacey; Ana Kokkinos
- Starring: Claire van der Boom; Andrea Demetriades; Owen Teale; Liam McIntyre; Susie Porter; Arka Das; Penny Cook; Blessing Mokgohloa; Pallavi Sharda; Renee Lim
- Country of origin: Australia
- No. of seasons: 1
- No. of episodes: 8

Production
- Executive producers: Kym Goldsworthy; David Ogilvy; Sally Riley; Ron Saunders
- Producers: Antony I. Ginnane; Kris Wyld
- Running time: 60 minutes
- Production companies: Clandestine TV; Beyond Productions; Australian Broadcasting Corporation

Original release
- Network: ABC TV
- Release: 20 July – 7 September 2017

Pulse is an Australian television drama series that was first screened on ABC TV on 20 July 2017 and ended after eight episodes on 7 September 2017.

The series was written by Kris Wyld, Michael Miller, Kristen Dunphy and Mandy McCarthy; directed by Peter Andrikidis, Jennifer Leacey and Ana Kokkinos; and produced by ClandestineTV and Beyond Productions in conjunction with the Australian Broadcasting Corporation.

== Plot summary ==
The series follows the story of Frankie, a high-flying financial analyst who had it all before a failing kidney landed her at death's door until a transplant offered her a second chance. Inspired by the man who saved her life, Frankie alters course to become a doctor herself, working and learning in the high stakes, high pressure world of the cardio-thoracic and renal wards of a major teaching hospital.

== Cast ==
=== Main / regular ===
- Claire van der Boom as Frankie Bell
- Andrea Demetriades as Lou Tannis
- Owen Teale as Chad Berger
- Liam McIntyre as Eli Nader
- Pallavi Sharda as Tanya Kalchuri
- Penny Cook as Carol Little
- Susie Porter as Maggie Cutter
- Renee Lim as Monica Lee
- Arka Das as Tabb Patel
- Blessing Mokgohloa as Rowan Mitri
- Dalip Sondhi as Rupert Steele

=== Guests ===
- Andrew McFarlane as Mack (2 episodes)
- Anthony Brandon Wong as Dr. Arthur Chan (2 episodes)
- Arianthe Galani as Chrissy Ropolous (1 episode)
- Carmen Duncan as Nora Johns (1 episode)
- Catherine Mack-Hancock as Alicia Knox (1 episode)
- Daniel Amalm as Shawn (1 episode)
- Geraldine Hakewill as Connie (1 episode)
- Helen Thomson as Lorraine Walsh (2 episodes)
- Lasarus Ratuere as Kenny Campbell (1 episode)
- Rahel Romahn as Adam Aswany (1 episode)
- Silvia Colloca as Lucy Berger (3 episodes)
- Zoe Carides as Lucia (1 episode)

== Episodes ==
No.	Title	Directed by	Written by	Original release date	Australian viewers
1	"Episode 1"	Peter Andrikidis	Kris Wyld & Mel Hill	20 July 2017	512,000
Transplant patient and now doctor, Frankie starts her first day in Renal rotation; best friend Lou battles surgery's boys' club; and flatmate Tabb starts as an intern.
2	"Episode 2"	Peter Andrikidis	Michael Miller	27 July 2017	478,000
Frankie takes on the system to save a patient, and lands in trouble. Lou finds out it's not always wise to have an affair with a boss; and Tabb questions his ability as a doctor.
3	"Episode 3"	Jennifer Leacey	Michael Miller	3 August 2017	404,000
When a heart transplant patient dies, Frankie fears the surgeons will close ranks to cover up a medical error. Lou realises she and best friend Frankie may be on different sides.
4	"Episode 4"	Jennifer Leacey	Michael Miller	10 August 2017	437,000
When a patient wants to turn off the device keeping her alive Steele tries to dissuade her. Lou feels betrayed when Frankie takes on a Root Cause Analysis into a patient's death, threatening her job.
5	"Episode 5"	Ana Kokkinos	Kris Wyld	17 August 2017	413,000
When Berger learns Frankie has a fever in the middle of a hospital outbreak, he forces her into a bed for treatment, putting her secret at risk of exposure.
6	"Episode 6"	Anna Kokkinos	Mandy McCarthy	24 August 2017	392,000
Tanya is forced to tell Frankie she read her medical files - a breach of professional ethics; while Berger works with Eli Nadar to save a patient from deportation.
7	"Episode 7"	Peter Andrikidis	Kristen Dunphy	31 August 2017	350,000
On the eve of an investigation into a patient's death, Frankie realises that all doctors are fallible when faced with the reality of a health system that isn't always able to cater for all.
8	"Episode 8"	Peter Andrikidis	Michael Miller	7 September 2017	384,000
Chad Berger's days as a doctor are coming to an end, but he is determined to see through a complex set of paired kidney exchange transplants.

== Reception ==
=== Ratings ===
No.	Title	Air date	Overnight ratings		Consolidated ratings		Total viewers	Ref(s)
No.	Title	Air date	Viewers	Rank	Viewers	Rank	Total viewers	Ref(s)
1	Episode 1	20 July 2017	512,000	13	86,000	11	598,000	
2	Episode 2	27 July 2017	478,000	15	63,000	12	541,000	
3	Episode 3	3 August 2017	404,000	16	43,000	15	447,000	
4	Episode 4	10 August 2017	437,000	15	70,000	14	507,000	
5	Episode 5	17 August 2017	413,000	16	57,000	15	470,000	
6	Episode 6	24 August 2017	392,000	18	64,000	16	456,000	
7	Episode 7	31 August 2017	350,000	19	76,000	16	426,000	
8	Episode 8	7 September 2017	384,000	18	71,000	13	455,000	

=== Critical reception ===
This series has received mixed reviews.

Luke Buckmaster, writer for The Guardian, rated the series two out of five stars saying "medical dramas will probably never fall out of fashion. The genre is crowded, emphasising the need for programs with interesting and distinctive visions. Unfortunately, Pulse isn’t one of them".

David Knox, writer for TV Tonight, rated the series four out of five stars praising the casting of the series and that it's "the strongest medical drama in years" saying that it holds strong against an overcrowded genre.
