= Melanie Salomon =

Australian actress

- Occupation: Actress
- Notable work: E Street; Edens Lost; Pell Mell

Melanie Salomon is an Australian actress. She was an original cast member on E Street, where she played Rhonda Berry. Salomon signed a 12-month contract with the show. She initially struggled to relate to her character, who she described as an "innocent country girl", but she grew fond of her. Salomon also featured in Edens Lost and wrote and starred in the one woman stage show Pell Mell for which she won the 1987 AWGIE Award for Comedy Revue/Sketch. She joined the cast of The Comedy Company for their 1990 season.

On stage she appeared in Carols by Laserlight with the Magpie Theatre Company in 1985 Characters (alongside her sister Mandy) at the Sydney Trade Union Club in 1984, The Headbutt at Belvoir Street Theatre in 1991, and playing Erica in Hating Alison Ashley with the Toe Truck Theatre at the Seymour Centre 1987.
