= Fighting Season =

Australian television series

- Genre: Drama
- Written by: Blake Ayshford
- Directed by: Kate Woods; Ben Lucas
- Country of origin: Australia
- Original language: English
- No. of seasons: 1
- No. of episodes: 6

Production
- Executive producers: Penny Win; Rosemary Blight; Ben Grant
- Producers: Kylie du Fresne; Elisa Argenzio; Blake Ayshford
- Production company: Goalpost Pictures

Original release
- Network: Fox Showcase
- Release: 28 October 2018

Fighting Season is a 2018 Australian television drama series that screened on Foxtel's Showcase channel. The series is a mystery involving Australian soldiers returning on leave from deployment in Afghanistan. The six-part series is written by Blake Ayshford.

== Cast ==
=== Main ===
- Jay Ryan as Sergent Sean 'Speedo' Collins
- Ewen Leslie as Captain Edward 'Ted' Nordenfelt
- Kate Mulvany as Captain Kim Nordenfelt
- Sarah Armanious as Vanessa Collins
- Marco Alosio as Private Isara'elu 'Izzy' Ulalei
- George Pullar as Private Jarrod 'Toast' Vogel
- Julian Maroun as Corporal Peter 'Pepsi' Aboud

=== Supporting ===
- Kaan Guldur as Callum Collins
- Milly Alcock as Maya Nordenfelt
- Bella Biasi / Brooklyn Biasi as Eli Collins
- Luca Darda as Ali Samad
- Zack Grech as Zac Nordenfelt
- Rhys Muldoon as Colonel Floss
- Jay Laga'aia as Siaosi Ulalei
- Randa Sayed as Asai Samad
- Paul de Gelder as Corporal Travis Davis
- Sabryna Walters as Leilani Ulalei
- Susan Prior as Dr Linda
- Ling-Hsueh Tang as Dian Lau
- Lucy Bell as Phillipa Vogel
- Lex Marinos as Hanny Aboud
- Lani Tupu as David Simpson
- John Gregg as Governor

== Episodes ==
No.	Title	Directed by	Written by	Original release date	Australian viewers
1	"Shooter / Hugger"	Unknown	Blake Ayshford	28 October 2018	36,000
2	"A Good Soldier Makes A Bad Civilian"	Unknown	Blake Ayshford	4 November 2018	N/A
3	"The Medal"	Unknown	Blake Ayshford	11 November 2018	N/A
4	"Blood Money"	Unknown	Blake Ayshford	18 November 2018	N/A
5	"Ricochet"	Unknown	Blake Ayshford	25 November 2018	N/A
6	"Outside the Wire"	Unknown	Blake Ayshford	2 December 2018	N/A
