= List of 2015 box office number-one films in Australia =

This is a list of films which have placed number one at the box office in Australia during 2015. All amounts are in Australian dollars.

== Number-one films ==
†	This implies the highest-grossing movie of the year.

#	Week ending	Film	Total week gross	Openings
1	7 January 2015	The Hobbit: The Battle of the Five Armies	$8,925,299	The Imitation Game (#2), Penguins of Madagascar (#3)
2	14 January 2015	Taken 3	$7,635,461	Into the Woods (#2), Dumb and Dumber To (#7)
3	21 January 2015	Taken 3	$3,702,615	Paper Planes (#2), Unbroken (#4), Birdman (#8), I (#15), The Last: Naruto the Movie (#19)
4	28 January 2015	American Sniper	$7,688,283	The Wedding Ringer (#9), Wild (#10), Baby (#19), National Theatre Live: Of Mice and Men (#20)
5	4 February 2015	American Sniper	$4,489,402	The Theory of Everything (#2), Mortdecai (#6), Still Alice (#15), Foxcatcher (#17)
6	11 February 2015	Kingsman: The Secret Service	$5,421,400	The Gambler (#6), Yennai Arindhaal (#18)
7	18 February 2015	Fifty Shades of Grey	$13,279,728	The Interview (#5), Selma (#7), What We Did on Our Holiday (#9), Somewhere Only We Know (#17), Wyrmwood (#18)
8	25 February 2015	Fifty Shades of Grey	$5,265,490	Jupiter Ascending (#3), Ode to My Father (#13), Triumph in the Skies (#14)
9	4 March 2015	The Second Best Exotic Marigold Hotel	$5,975,466	Project Almanac (#5), A Most Violent Year (#14), That Sugar Film (#17), Kaaki Sattai (#19), Zhong Kui: Snow Girl and the Dark Crystal (#20)
10	11 March 2015	The Second Best Exotic Marigold Hotel	$3,867,615	Focus (#2), Seventh Son (#5), Unfinished Business (#6), 12 Golden Ducks (#18)
11	18 March 2015	The Second Best Exotic Marigold Hotel	$2,325,617	Chappie (#3), Manny Lewis (#9), Inherent Vice (#10), Top Five (#17), Met Opera: The Merry Widow (#18)
12	25 March 2015	The Divergent Series: Insurgent	$5,033,155	Home (#2), Run All Night (#5), Big Eyes (#11)
13	1 April 2015	Cinderella	$6,106,332	Get Hard (#4), Shaun the Sheep Movie (#7), A Little Chaos (#13), Dior and I (#16), Leviathan (#18)
14	8 April 2015	Furious 7	$22,251,377	The SpongeBob Movie: Sponge Out of Water (#4), The Duff (#8), Tinker Bell and the Legend of the Neverbeast (#12), The Book of Life (#14), Samba (#15)
15	15 April 2015	Furious 7	$10,607,882	The Longest Ride (#5), X+Y (#15), Let's Get Married (#19)
16	22 April 2015	Furious 7	$5,514,710	Paul Blart: Mall Cop 2 (#4), The Age of Adaline (#9), While We're Young (#13), The Gunman (#14), O Kadhal Kanmani (#17), Wolf Warriors (#18)
17	29 April 2015	Avengers: Age of Ultron	$19,513,258	Boychoir (#10), Testament of Youth (#12), National Theatre Live: Behind the Beautiful Forevers (#19)
18	6 May 2015	Avengers: Age of Ultron	$9,462,966	Unfriended (#2), Uttama Villain (#14), Gabbar is Back (#15), Helios (#17)
19	13 May 2015	Pitch Perfect 2	$11,608,824	Cobain: Montage of Heck (#6), Piku (#10), Ex Machina (#12), Clouds of Sils Maria (#14), The Left Ear (#17), National Theatre Live: A View from the Bridge (#18)
20	20 May 2015	Mad Max: Fury Road	$8,408,309	A Royal Night Out (#4), When Marnie Was There (#17), Bombay Velvet (#20)
21	27 May 2015	Mad Max: Fury Road	$5,365,597	Spy (#2), Woman in Gold (#4), Poltergeist (#6), Tanu Weds Manu Returns (#8), Wild Tales (#13), National Theatre Live: The Hard Problem (#16)
22	3 June 2015	San Andreas	$4,168,739	Tomorrowland (#5), Gaddar: The Traitor (#12), Masss (#13), Gemma Bovery (#17), Exhibition on Screen: The Impressionists (#19)
23	10 June 2015	Entourage	$4,647,996	Aloha (#5)
24	17 June 2015	Jurassic World	$20,365,513	Hot Pursuit (#8), The Mafia Kills Only in the Summer (#13), Met Opera: La donna del lago (#16), Hamari Adhuri Kahani (#20)
25	24 June 2015	Jurassic World	$12,566,116	Minions (#2), Inside Out (#3), Going Clear: Scientology and the Prison of Belief (#13), ABCD 2 (#16)
26	1 July 2015	Minions	$7,842,450	Ted 2 (#4), Far from the Madding Crowd (#6), Sardaar Ji (#8), Love & Mercy (#13), National Theatre Live: Man and Superman (#16)
27	8 July 2015	Minions	$8,461,363	Terminator Genisys (#3), Amy (#8), Met Opera: Cavalleria rusticana & Pagliacci (#16), Papanasam (#18)
28	15 July 2015	Inside Out	$5,669,061	Magic Mike XXL (#2), Madame Bovary (#9), Forever Young (#14), Hero Naam Yaad Rakhi (#15)
29	22 July 2015	Ant-Man	$6,771,158	Paper Towns (#3), Bajrangi Bhaijaan (#8), Insidious: Chapter 3 (#11), Ruben Guthrie (#13), Northern Limit Line (#18), Women He's Undressed (#19), Maari (#20)
30	29 July 2015	Ant-Man	$4,007,292	André Rieu: 2015 Maastricht Concert (#5), Self/less (#7), Mr. Holmes (#10), The Gallows (#12), Monster Hunt (#15)
31	5 August 2015	Mission: Impossible – Rogue Nation	$6,556,633	Angrej (#8), Jian Bing Man (#13), Far from Men (#18)
32	12 August 2015	Trainwreck	$4,309,748	Fantastic Four (#3), Last Cab to Darwin (#4), Dragon Ball Z: Resurrection 'F' (#6)
33	19 August 2015	Trainwreck	$2,766,150	The Man from U.N.C.L.E. (#3), 5 Flights Up (#12), Brothers (#13), Go Away Mr. Tumor! (#14), Iris (#18)
34	26 August 2015	Vacation	$2,107,484	Southpaw (#2), Hitman: Agent 47 (#5), Irrational Man (#10), Dope (#20)
35	2 September 2015	Southpaw	$1,666,990	Ricki and the Flash (#2), The Gift (#4), War Room (#10), Holding the Man (#11), We Are Your Friends (#12), Attack on Titan (#13), Assassination (#14), She's Funny That Way (#20)
36	9 September 2015	Straight Outta Compton	$5,918,691	A Walk in the Woods (#4), American Ultra (#10), Me and Earl and the Dying Girl (#13), The Transporter Refueled (#15), Welcome Back (#16)
37	16 September 2015	Maze Runner: The Scorch Trials	$4,512,496	Pixels (#3)
38	23 September 2015	Everest	$4,720,817	Oddball (#4), Blinky Bill the Movie (#6)
39	30 September 2015	Pixels	$3,850,282	Pan (#2), Sicario (#6), The Visit (#7), Lost in Hong Kong (#10), Veteran (#11), Kis Kisko Pyaar Karoon (#14)
40	7 October 2015	The Martian	$8,856,679	The Intern (#2), Singh Is Bliing (#13), Puli (#14), Macbeth (#15), Attack on Titan Part 2: End of the World (#16)
41	14 October 2015	The Martian	$5,835,420	Black Mass (#3), Miss You Already (#5), Learning to Drive (#13), Goodbye Mr. Loser (#18), Jazbaa (#19)
42	21 October 2015	The Martian	$4,063,065	Crimson Peak (#3), Legend (#4), Boruto: Naruto the Movie (#12), UNindian (#16), Back to the Future: 30th Anniversary (#20)
43	28 October 2015	The Martian	$2,863,168	Bridge of Spies (#2), Paranormal Activity: The Ghost Dimension (#3), Burnt (#4), Shareek (#14), Alex & Eve (#15), Ed Sheeran: Jumpers for Goalposts (#17), Shaandaar (#18), The Lobster (#19)
44	4 November 2015	The Dressmaker	$4,785,167	The Last Witch Hunter (#4), The Witness (#13), Sleeping with Other People (#19)
45	11 November 2015	The Dressmaker	$4,389,213	Scouts Guide to the Zombie Apocalypse (#6), Man Up (#10), National Theatre Live: Hamlet (#11), Ex-Files 2: The Backup Strike Back (#14), Ronaldo (#15), Now Add Honey (#17)
46	18 November 2015	Spectre	$14,440,146	Prem Ratan Dhan Payo (#4), He Named Me Malala (#13), Met Opera: Otello (#19)
47	25 November 2015	The Hunger Games: Mockingjay – Part 2	$12,599,590	Secret in Their Eyes (#4), Our Times (#7), Florence and the Uffizi Gallery (#10), A Journey Through Time with Antony (#11), 99 Homes (#13)
48	2 December 2015	The Hunger Games: Mockingjay – Part 2	$6,898,245	Hotel Transylvania 2 (#3), Creed (#4), Love the Coopers (#6), Tamasha (#8), By the Sea (#9), Mukhtiar Chadha (#13), The Program (#14)
49	9 December 2015	The Hunger Games: Mockingjay – Part 2	$3,947,041	In the Heart of the Sea (#5), The Night Before (#6), Truth (#12), Phoenix (#16), Fall in Love Like a Star (#17), Met Opera: Tannhäuser (#18)
50	16 December 2015	The Hunger Games: Mockingjay – Part 2	$2,933,383	Inside Men (#12), A Second Chance (#15)
51	23 December 2015	Star Wars: The Force Awakens †	$38,537,569	Dilwale (#6), Bajirao Mastani (#8), Mojin: The Lost Legend (#10), Surprise (#13), Thanga Magan (#16)
52	30 December 2015	Star Wars: The Force Awakens †	$19,397,889	Daddy's Home (#2), The Good Dinosaur (#3), Alvin and the Chipmunks: The Road Chip (#4), Joy (#5), Suffragette (#6), Youth (#13), The Bélier Family (#16)

== Highest-grossing films ==
Highest-grossing films of 2015
Rank	Title	Distributor	Domestic gross
1	Star Wars: The Force Awakens	Disney	$44,459,153
2	Jurassic World	Universal	$38,978,832
3	Furious 7	Universal	$33,888,567
4	Avengers: Age of Ultron	Disney	$26,940,069
5	Spectre	Sony	$26,126,519
6	Minions	Universal	$23,451,902
7	Inside Out	Disney	$22,600,759
8	Pitch Perfect 2	Universal	$20,456,041
9	The Martian	Fox	$19,600,085
10	The Hunger Games: Mockingjay – Part 2	Roadshow Films	$18,890,259

== See also ==
- List of Australian films - Australian films by year
- 2015 in film
