= The Principal (TV series) =

Australian four-part drama series

- Region 4 DVD cover
- Written by: Kristen Dunphy; Alice Addison
- Directed by: Kriv Stenders
- Starring: Alex Dimitriades; Mirrah Foulkes; Salvatore Coco; Andrea Demetriades
- Country of origin: Australia
- No. of series: 1
- No. of episodes: 4

Production
- Executive producers: Sue Masters; Alison Sharman
- Producer: Ian Collie
- Production companies: Essential Media & Entertainment

Original release
- Network: SBS One
- Release: 7 October – 15 October 2015

The Principal is an Australian four-part drama series which aired over two weeks on SBS starting 7 October 2015. It was written by Kristen Dunphy and Alice Addison, directed by Kriv Stenders and produced by Ian Collie.

== Cast ==
- Alex Dimitriades as Matt Bashir
- Aden Young as Adam Bilic
- Mirrah Foulkes as Kellie Norton
- Salvatore Coco as Frank Calabrisi
- Andrea Demetriades as Hafa Habeb
- Rahel Romahn as Tarek Ahmad
- Tyler De Nawi as Karim Ahmad
- Miles Gibson as Chris Langworth
- Narek Arman as Sami Vivas
- Karim Zreika as Bilal Folouk
- Rebecca Massey as Rina
- Tim Abdallah as Farid
- Thuso Lekwape as Kenny
- Michael Denkha as Mohammad Ahmad
- Arianthe Galani as Mrs Bashir
- Robert Mammone as Dino Abbadelli
- Angela Punch McGregor as Sue Longworthy

== Awards ==
At the 2016 58th Annual TV Week Logie Awards, Alex Dimitriades won the Most Outstanding Actor award for The Principal.

== Home media ==
The series was released as a Region 4 single disc DVD on 4 November 2015 by SBS in Australia.
