= Paul Kelly =

Paul Kelly may refer to:

== Academia ==
- Paul Kelly (mathematician) (1915–1995), American mathematician
- Paul Kelly (journalist) (born 1947), Australian journalist
- Paul Kelly (lawyer) (born c. 1955), American lawyer and former NHL Players Association executive director
- Paul Kelly (professor) (born 1962), British political theorist
- Paul Kelly (doctor), epidemiologist who is currently Chief Medical Officer of Australia

== Sportspeople ==
- Paul Kelly (cricketer) (born 1960), New Zealand cricketer
- Paul Kelly (Australian rules footballer) (born 1969), Australian rules footballer
- Paul Kelly (footballer, born 1969), English footballer
- Paul Kelly (soccer) (born 1974), American soccer player
- Paul Kelly (hurler) (born 1979), Irish hurler
- Paul Kelly (fighter) (born 1984), British martial artist
- Paul Kelly (football manager), with the Tipperary county team

== Music and film ==
- Paul Kelly (actor) (1899–1956), American stage and screen actor
- Paul Kelly (American musician) (1940–2012), American soul singer-songwriter
- Paul Kelly (Australian musician) (born 1955), Australian rock, folk and country musician
- Paul Kelly (Irish musician) (born 1957), Irish traditional, bluegrass and country musician
- Paul Austin Kelly (born 1960), American opera tenor and former rock musician
- Paul Kelly (film maker) (born 1962), British film maker and musician

== Politics ==
- Paul Joseph Kelly Jr. (born 1940), US federal judge
- Paul V. Kelly (born 1947), Assistant Secretary of State for Legislative Affairs, 2001–2005
- Paul Kelly (politician) (born 1963), Canadian politician

== Other ==
- Paul Kelly (criminal) (1876–1936), American criminal and founder of the Five Points Gang
- Paul Anthony Kelly (born 1988), Canadian model and actor

== See also ==
- Anthony Paul Kelly (1897–1932), American screenwriter
- John Paul Kelly (disambiguation), several people
- Paul Kelly – Stories of Me, 2012 Australian documentary about the musician, directed by Ian Darling
- Paul X. Kelley (1928–2019), twenty-eighth Commandant of the United States Marine Corps
