= Rahel Romahn =

Australian actor

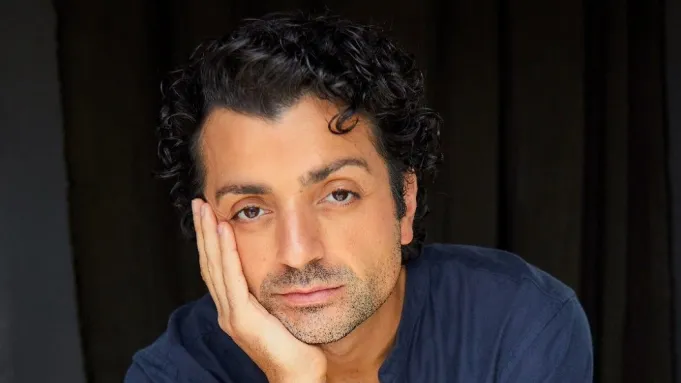
- Born: c. 1993; Kurdistan, North Iraq
- Occupation: Actor
- Years active: 2007–present
- Notable work: The Principal (2015)

Rahel Romahn (born c. 1993) is a Kurdish-Iraqi born Australian actor.

== Early life ==
Born in Kurdistan, in Northern Iraq, Romahn's family fled Saddam Hussein’s regime when he was three, initially hiding in Turkey for a year, then emigrating to Australia, where he grew up in Parramatta, in western Sydney.

Despite having to adjust to a new language and culture, Rohman was performing in school productions by grade three, playing Fagin in Oliver Twist and Hook in Peter Pan. Romahn describes himself as "an oddball recluse who loved to mimic people and accents." After watching Al Pacino in Scarface, he was inspired to express himself creatively. He got further into acting, after hearing a radio advertisement for a local drama school when he was 13, and took screen acting workshops in Sydney.

After Romahn finished high school, he worked in customer service for a leading Australian bank, while honing his acting skills at home after hours. Stage and screen appearances followed.

== Career ==
Romahn initially scored a small role in Underbelly in 2010. From there he starred in his breakthrough role in SBS miniseries The Principal.

Other roles he has played include the TV series Shantaram and Mr Inbetween, miniseries Australian Gangster and films Little Monsters, Ali's Wedding, Down Under and Alex & Eve.

He has also appeared in a number of stage roles, most recently as Mozart (opposite Michael Sheen as Antonio Salieri) in Amadeus at the Sydney Opera House in 2023.

For his performance in The Principal, Romahn was nominated for the 2016 AACTA Award for Best Guest or Supporting Actor in a Television Drama and the 2016 Logie Award for Most Outstanding Newcomer. In 2022, he was also the winner of the annual Heath Ledger Scholarship, selected from a field of more than 600 candidates.

== Personal life ==
Romahn is a fan of English football club, Liverpool.

== Filmography ==
=== Film ===
Year	Title	Role	Type
2007	Battle Therapy Too	Deepak	Feature film
2008	The Ground Beneath	Lewis	Short film
2009	The Combination	Mo	Feature film
2009	Bani Ibrahim	Yusof	Short film
2012	The Day Hollywood Died	Charlie	Feature film
2012	Smile, Lisa	Ray	Short film
2015	Alex & Eve	Shadi	Feature film
2015	Benny	Tony	Short film (also co-director)
2016	Down Under	Nick	Feature film
2016	Ali's Wedding	Ayoob	Feature film
2017	The Missing	Bad Guy	Short film
2017	Blood Orange	Eli	Short film (also executive producer)
2019	Little Monsters	Griffin	Feature film
2019	The Combination: Redemption	Mo	Feature film
2020	Moon Rock for Monday	Moose	Feature film
2021	Here Out West	Rashid	Anthology film
2023	Streets of Colour	Terrence 'Tez' Hadid	Feature film
2023	Crushing Season	Ando	Short film
2024	Furiosa: A Mad Max Saga	Vulture	Feature film
2024	The Surfer	Conlon, The Estate Agent	Feature film
2024	The Correspondent	Baher Mohamed	Feature film
Post-production	Wizards!	The Man / Alexander	Feature film

=== Television ===
Year	Title	Role	Type
2010	Underbelly: The Golden Mile	Talal Assaad	TV miniseries, episode 7: "Full Force Gale"
2010	Gangs of Oz	Wahlid	TV series, season 2, episode 3: "Young Guns, Loose Cannons"
2011	Random Dares	Ray	TV series, season 1, episode 4: "Puppy Dogs"
2015	The Principal	Tarek Ahmad	TV miniseries, 4 episodes
2015	Ready for This	Ryan	TV series, 2 episodes
2016	Janet King	Sam Nobakht	TV series, season 2, 6 episodes
2016	Cleverman	Ludo	TV series, season 1, episode 1: "First Contact"
2016	Hyde & Seek	Jamil	TV miniseries, 2 episodes
2017	Plans	Zia	TV miniseries, 7 episodes
2017	The Other Guy	Paul Perry	TV series, season 1, episode 6: "Dog Murphy"
2017	Pulse	Adam Aswany	TV miniseries, episode 7
2018	Mr Inbetween	Hassam	TV series, season 1, 2 episodes
2019	Secret City	Nakeesh	TV series, season 2, episode 5: "From Whom the Bell Tolls"
2021	Australian Gangster	Mohammed 'Little Crazy' Hamzy, Brothers for Life member	TV miniseries, 2 episodes
2022	God’s Favourite Idiot	Pestilence	TV series, season 1, 2 episodes
2022	8 Nights Out West	Himself	TV series, season 1, episode 1
2022	Shantaram	Rafiq	TV series, season 1, 7 episodes
2023	Wolf Like Me	Kaos	TV series, season 2, episode 3
2024	Human Error	Jarred Pines	TV miniseries, 6 episodes

== Stage ==
Year	Title	Role	Type
2016	A Midsummer Night’s Dream	Snug / Moth / A Fairy	Sydney Opera House with STC
2017	Three Sisters	Solyony	Sydney Opera House with STC
2018	The Harp in the South	Herb Lennon / Harry Drummy / Ernest Blainey	Roslyn Packer Theatre with STC
2019	Mary Stuart	Davison	Roslyn Packer Theatre with STC
2019	Lord of the Flies	Piggy	Roslyn Packer Theatre with STC
2019	Cosi	Doug	Southbank Theatre, Melbourne, Sydney Opera House with MTC & STC
2020	No Pay? No Way!	Luigi	Sydney Opera House with STC
2021	Queen Fatima	Karim	Riverside Theatres Parramatta for Sydney Festival
2022	Amadeus	Mozart	Sydney Opera House

== Awards ==
Year	Work	Award	Category	Result
2016	The Principal	AACTA Awards	Best Guest or Supporting Actor in a Television Drama	Nominated
2016	The Principal	Logie Awards	Most Outstanding Newcomer	Nominated
2022	Rahel Romahn	Heath Ledger Scholarship		Won
