= Kristen Dunphy =

Australian television screenwriter

- Occupation(s): Television screenwriter and producer
- Notable credit: Wakefield
- Awards: Foxtel Scholarship, 2012

Kristen Dunphy is an Australian television screenwriter and producer. She is best known as creator, co-writer and co-executive producer of Wakefield, which screened on ABC TV in 2021.

== Career ==
Dunphy's career in film and television began when producer Sandra Levy employed her to work as assistant to Gillian Armstrong, who was directing the 1987 film, High Tide. When Levy became head of drama at ABC TV she employed Dunphy as a screenwriter on G.P. (1992–1996), The Ferals (1995) and Heartbreak High (1995–1997).

Dunphy, as creator, co-writer and joint executive producer, began developing the eight-part serial, Wakefield in 2012. During its production in 2020 she worked as joint showrunner. Wakefield screened on ABC TV in 2021 and received five AACTA Award nominations.

== Awards and recognition ==
Dunphy won her first AWGIE in 2003 for Best Television Series Episode for episode 14 of White Collar Blue (Network 10/Knapman Wyld). She won the 2008 AWGIE for Best Television Series Drama for Eastwest 101 (SBS/Knapman Wyld) and the 2012 AWGIE for Best Mini-Series Television Drama for The Straits (ABC/Matchbox) 2012. She was awarded the Foxtel Fellowship in 2012 for her "significant contribution to the Australian cultural landscape made by television writing".

== Selected filmography ==
=== Television series ===
Year	Title	Role
1992–1995	G.P.	writer
1994	Heartland	writer
1995	The Ferals	writer
1995–1997	Heartbreak High	writer
1996	Fallen Angels	writer
1997	Mirror Mirror II	writer
1997–1998	Murder Call	writer
1998–1999	Wildside	writer
1999	All Saints	writer
2000	Water Rats	writer
2002–2003	White Collar Blue	writer and script editor
2006	Blue Water High	writer
2007–2009	East West 101	writer
2012	The Straits	writer
2013	Miss Fisher's Murder Mysteries	writer and script editor
2015	The Principal	co-creator and writer
2016–2017	Secret Daughter	co-creator
2021	Wakefield	creator, writer, showrunner and executive producer

=== Films ===
Year	Title	Role
1987	High Tide	director's assistant
2004	Blackjack: Sweet Science	writer
2005	Small Claims: White Wedding	script editor
