= Alex & Eve =

- Theatrical Release Poster
- Directed by: Peter Andrikidis
- Written by: Alex Lykos
- Produced by: Murray Fahey
- Starring: Richard Brancatisano; Andrea Demetriades; Zoe Carides; Tony Nikolakopoulos
- Distributed by: Magicbox Entertainment
- Release dates: 24 April 2015 (Newport Beach); 22 October 2015
- Running time: 87 minutes
- Country: Australia
- Language: English
- Budget: A$1.6 million

Alex & Eve is a 2015 Australian romantic comedy film directed by Peter Andrikidis and written by Alex Lykos based on Lykos's 2006 play of the same name. The film adaptation was released in October 2015 by producer, Murray Fahey's distribution company, Magicbox Entertainment. The film centres around Greek Orthodox school teacher Alex (Richard Brancatisano), who falls in love with a Muslim lawyer from Lebanon, Eve (Andrea Demetriades). The stage production of the same name premiered in 2006 and finished in 2008, with sequels running until 2016. The film explores multiculturalism in Australia, as well as the importance of family, in a light-hearted manner. The film was received with overall positive reviews and was nominated for three awards in 2016, including Best Feature Film at the Los Angeles Greek Film Festival. The film was set in Sydney, Australia and reached international audiences.

== Plot ==
Alex is a quiet, unassuming schoolteacher whose students call him gay because he is unattached. His friend Paul is dating legal receptionist Claire, who has lawyer Eve for a friend. They contrive to have Alex and Eve meet, and from the start it is an uneven and quirky relationship. He is Greek Orthodox and she is Lebanese Muslim. Both sets of parents are vehemently opposed to this relationship when they discover what is going on. Then we discover that Eve's family have arranged for her to marry a Lebanese from overseas. Paul is distraught and after yet another argument with his prejudiced father, he moves out of his home. Eve's brother, who at first opposed any relationship, now sees that Eve loves Alex. On the day Eve is to wed Mohammed her brother approaches Alex and demands to know if he loves Eve, upon discovering that Alex does in fact love Eve he tells Alex to go after her. Alex bundles his family into his car and confronts Eve at the wedding, after initially saying that she can't be with him she changes her mind as Alex is walking away. The two run hand in hand to the waiting bridal car where they kiss as they are driven away from the abandoned wedding.

== Cast ==
- Richard Brancatisano as Alex
- Andrea Demetriades as Eve
- Tony Nikolakopoulos as George
- Zoe Carides as Chloe
- Helen Chebatte as Salwa
- Simon Elrahi as Bassam
- Alex Lykos as Stavros
- Ryan O'Kane as Paul
- Millie Samuels as Clare
- George Kapiniaris as Uncle Tasso
- Jen Apostolou as Aunty Vaso
- Katerine-Ann MacKinnon-Lee as Sarah
- Chloe Condylis as Rima
- Emma-Jane MacKinnon-Lee as Mandy
- Nathan Melki as Chris
- Rahel Romahn as Shadi
- Hazem Shammas as Mohomad
- Serina Al Abbass As Shireen
- Helena Stamoulis as Stella
- Wafa Lahoud as Aunty Fatma
- Abdulla Sankari as Mini George

== Production/development ==
=== History ===
Alex & Eve was originally a romantic-comedic stage play, written by Alex Lykos and premiered in 2006. It made its first appearance on 12 July 2006 at the Sidetrack Shed Theatre in Marrickville, Sydney, to a low audience number on opening weekend. The play performed for two weeks from Wednesday to Sunday, in the one hundred seat venue, and extended the run when audience numbers began to increase. The play finished performing in 2008 at the 400-seat Factory Theatre in Enmore. Due to the play's success, the play had three sequels; Alex & Eve: The Wedding, Alex & Eve: The Baby, and Alex & Eve: The Complete Story. Alex & Eve initially as a stage play, developed into a film in 2015.

=== Stage play ===
Alex & Eve stage play was written in 2004, taking approximately eight to twelve months to develop the script. The original stage play was directed by Michael Block, and rehearsals took approximately two months.

=== Sequels ===
Alex & Eve: The Wedding, made its first appearance in May 2009, originally scheduled for two weeks but played 17 performances to 6,500 people at the Factory Theatre in Marrickville, Sydney due to high demand. After sold out sessions at the Factory, Alex & Eve: The Wedding, performed at Enmore Theatre in Newtown, Sydney, with an audience of 1600 people, on 1 August 2009, These sessions continued to sell out shows resulting in the sequel of Alex & Eve: The Baby.

Alex & Eve: The Baby premiered on 11 August 2011 and ran until the 21 August 2011, at the Factory Theatre in Marrickville, Sydney This third stage play was the finale to the two previous stage plays. All shows at the Factory Theatre was sold out, resulting in the creation of Alex & Eve: The Complete Story.

Alex & Eve: The Complete Story premiered on 23 August 2016 in Sydney, running until the 27 August, and ran from 1 to 4 September 2016 in Melbourne. The play performed at the Lennox Theatre in Parramatta on 29 October 2016. The play expanded to Melbourne, playing at the Greek Centre for Contemporary Culture.Alex & Eve: The Complete Story incorporates the previous stage plays together into one show, from "six hours of theatre into two".

All four stage plays have been seen by 40,000 people across Australia between the years of 2006 and 2016.

=== Film ===
Lykos decided to make the stage a film production in late 2009, adapted from the original script by Lykos. Lykos identifies his struggle in morphing the play into a film, from writer to producer, due to "not understanding the process of filmmaking and film distribution." Executive producers, Martin Cooper, Bill Kritharas and Producer, Murray Fahey, secured finance for the film in 2014 by private investors and the film was released by Fahey's distribution company, Magic box Entertainment.

Alex & Eve began filming in June 2014, taking approximately five months, and released from 16 October 2015 to the 9 June 2016. Most of the film was located in the inner-west suburbs of Sydney, Australia; Lakemba, Canterbury, Homebush, Lidcombe, Burwood and Strathfield," as well as scenes located in the school Sir Joseph Banks High in Revesby and the area of Southern Sydney, in the suburb of Belmore. These areas helped promote migrants in society, in realistically interpreting how cultures interact in the one area.

Director, Andrikidis wanted to present "the multicultural city of Sydney as a central character," with his direction "reflect(ing) the improvised and naturalistic style of Magnolia" to engage audiences. Andrikidis identified the challenge of a small budget of $1.6 million compared to Hollywood productions of $20 million.

== History of Alex Lykos ==
Alex Lykos (born in Marrickville, Sydney) is a writer, theatre-maker, filmmaker and actor. Lykos wrote the Alex & Eve stage play scripts during Greece's win at the 2004 Euro Championship, where Greece was spoken regularly after their win, incorporating Greece into a stage play which focused on "men's struggles with love, insecurities and identity." Lykos fused this idea when he met a Lebanese Muslim and explored the possibility of a romantic relationship evolving between the two, focusing on the "30s male trying to find somebody." In 2005, Lykos formed his own production company, Bulldog Theatre Company Inc. after his Alex & Eve script was rejected by other companies.

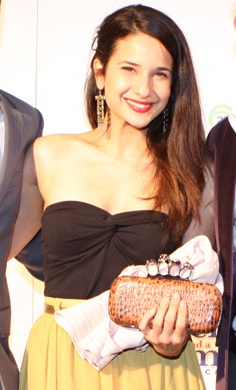
Actress Andrea Demetriades plays character 'Eve' in the 2016 film adaptation of Alex & Eve.

The characters of the film are loosely based on Alex Lykos' life, with scripts developing from many of his 2003 journal entries, with his immigrant parents influencing the characters of George and Chloe. The character Eve is loosely based on a Lebanese Muslim girl Lykos dated for a few months. The character Alex, in the film, is written as a math schoolteacher, whilst Lykos studied teaching maths, and is a substitute teacher at Dulwich Hill high school. Lykos played the role of 'Alex' in his stage plays, including its sequels, for approximately ten years (around 2006 to 2016), identifying his close connection with the character. Alex & Eve was Lykos' first feature film both for writing the screenplay and performing on screen.

== Themes ==
=== Stage plays ===
Writer, Alex Lykos aimed to engage the audience in his stage plays, in "confronting issues through comedy and light heartedness" and thinking of "their own views about people not from their ethnic background."

=== Film ===
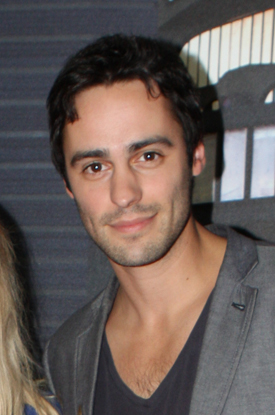
Actor Richard Brancatisano plays character 'Alex' in the 2016 film adaptation of Alex & Eve.

Director Peter Andrikidis, and writer, Alex Lykos, attempted to represent many cultural backgrounds in the film, in reflecting Australian culture of migrants and "foreign born in the (Australian) population." Producers believed this to be significant, bringing in an Islamic advisor, to accurately reflect on religion and culture in the film. The film presents itself as displaying "intercultural difficulties", presenting two different cultures and their struggles overlapping with one another. Andrikidis also reflected the importance of family, as a universal trait in all cultures, with a comedic element. The film explores the idea of "interracial and interfaith dating within a wider Australian context" in the characters of Alex & Eve.

Richard Brancatisano related to his character 'Alex', through personal experience by his friends and family, in their migrant stories of "assimilating into Australian culture." The film reflects the prevalence of multiculturalism, especially through Southern Europeans in Australia, reflected in the main character 'Alex's' heritage of Greek.

=== Multiculturalism ===
Alex Lykos stated that his goal was to "encourage tolerance, understanding and compromise", specifically covering migration and refugee issues. The Daily Telegraph identified the comedic play as "exploring Australian multicultural issues bound to draw crowds." Peter Andrikidis gave greater significance in his directing style, through his use of pace to establish the idea of "controlled chaos" with the multiple cultures in the film, reflecting Australia's current populated areas.

Lykos influenced casting choices due to the importance of inclusion of CALD actors, being culturally and linguistically diverse populations, to reflect multiculturalism and "diversity in modern Australia."

== Casting ==
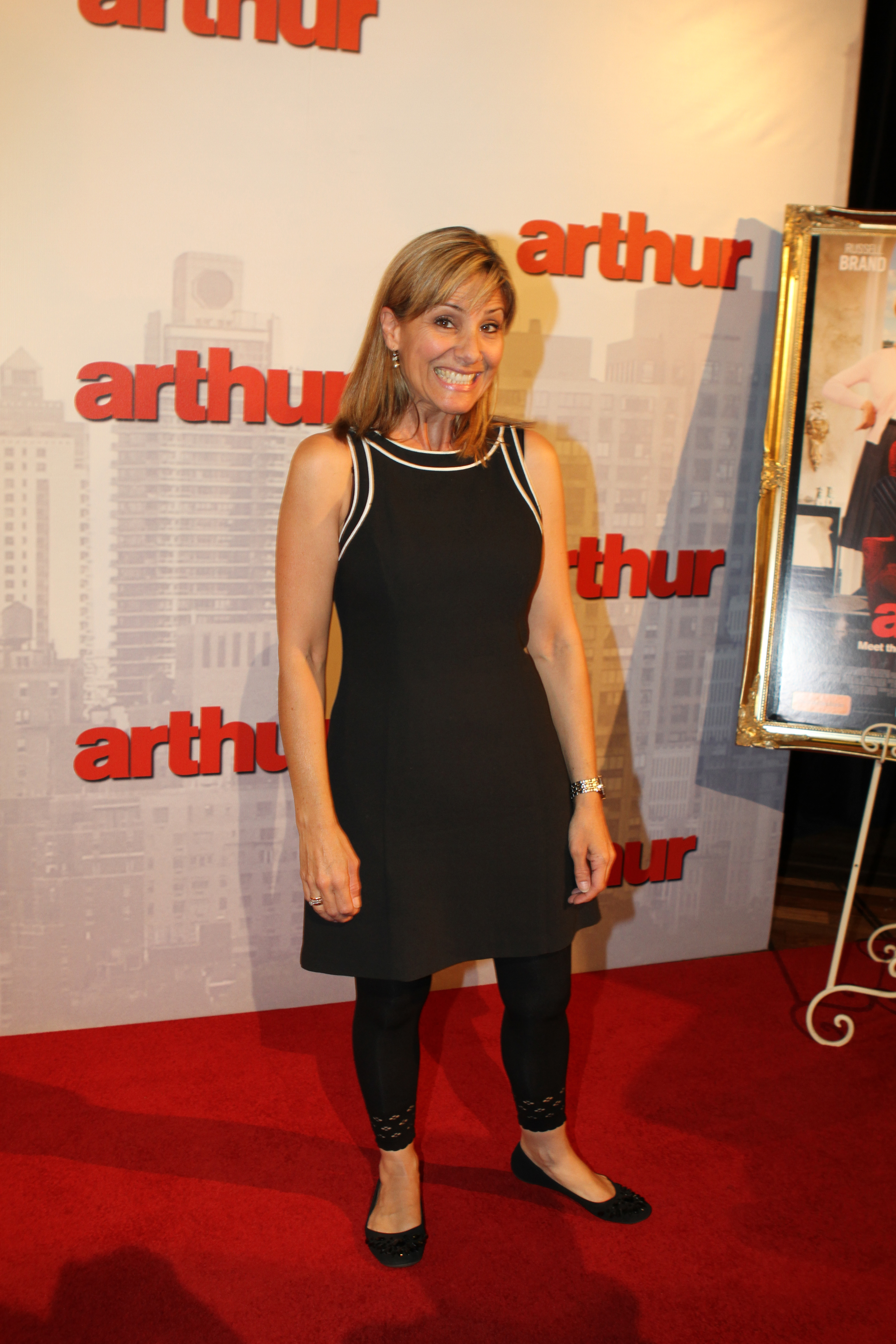
Actress Zoe Carides plays character 'Chloe' in the 2016 film adaptation of Alex & Eve.

The casting period for the film took over six months in 2014, headed by Anousha Zarkesh. The director of the film, Peter Andrikidis, as well as the producer of the film, Murray Fahey, wanted to ensure the cast accurately reflected multiculturalist Australia.

== Soundtrack ==
The film was scored by "composer and music supervisor", Steve Peach, "featur(ing) (his) playing the bouzouki and the oud", with Alex & Eve being his first feature film. The music incorporates elements of both Greek and Lebanese instruments and time signatures.

No.	Title	Writer	Length
1.	Fragosiriani	Steve Peach	2:12
2.	Kebab	Steve Peach	0:41
3.	Lebanese Dancing	Steve Peach	1:01
4.	Samiotisa	Steve Peach, Ms Terry	2:59
5.	Eves Theme	Steve Peach	2:04
6.	Auto Rebetiko	Steve Peach	2:28
7.	Bassam	Steve Peach	0:38
8.	Bridgeclimb (Pt. 1)	Steve Peach	2:20
9.	Bridgeclimb (Pt. 2)	Steve Peach	2:15
10.	Shower	Steve Peach	1:17
11.	Eves Phone Call	Steve Peach	0:48
12.	Lounge Bar (Pt. 1)	Steve Peach	2:00
13.	Meet The Parents	Steve Peach	2:09
14.	Send My Love	Carlotta Chadwick	3:29
15.	Alex Is Going (Pt. 1)	Steve Peach	2:30
16.	Gym	Steve Peach	1:03
17.	Eves Theme (Pt. 2)	Steve Peach	2:23
18.	Lounge Bar (Pt. 2)	Steve Peach	1:55
19.	Karma Sutra	Steve Peach	0:43
20.	Eves Theme (Reprise)	Steve Peach	1:22
21.	Alex Is Going (Pt. 2)	Steve Peach	1:12
22.	Eve Says Yes	Steve Peach	1:19
23.	Samiotisa Reprise (Instrumental)	Steve Peach	1:50
24.	Looking for Love	Brothers 3	3:33
		Total length:	38:23

== Film reception ==
=== Critical response ===
Alex & Eve was regarded with mixed opinions, but with overall success. On the review aggregator website Rotten Tomatoes, 82% of 11 critics' reviews are positive, with an average rating of 5.6/10. Critic, Greg King, of the Australian Film Critics Association, identifies the film as a "delightful romantic comedy...hold(ing) great appeal for mainstream audiences." The Guardian scored the film a 3 out of 5, for "offer(ing) a marketable point of difference to Hollywood...without overplaying their multiculturalism angle." Sydney Morning Herald and the Age identified it as "at times broad and a touch gauche but it has the spark of real life, and a sense that it could not have come from anywhere else."

Cinephilia Film Reviews identifies it as "well-intentioned in its depiction of its Sydney settings, but it is so trivialising in its contrived and ham-fistedly manipulative play for laughs." David Stratton of The Australian gave it a 1.5 out of 5, of which the film "seems strained...as both families register their horror...the material may have been funny on stage." The Hollywood Reporter recognises its "witty dialogue but delivered intermittently, (with) supporting characters poorly defined, however effective use of the Sydney locations." The Herald Sun reports the film as a 1.5 out of 5 of whom the "support players are given too much free rein to indulge in dated histrionics."

=== Audience response ===
==== Stage plays ====
The audience consisted of many "Greeks and Muslims sitting side by side...(reflecting) social cohesion in the theatre audience." Alex & Eve continued to sell out sessions, resulting in the development and success of its sequels; Alex & Eve: The Wedding, Alex & Eve: The Baby, and Alex & Eve: The Complete Story, reflecting the engagement of audiences in the story and the characters.

==== Film ====
Director, Peter Andrikidis found the audience's reaction of "laughter to tears" at the Greek Film Festival in Palace's Norton Street Leichardt cinemas, during his first viewing with an audience. Producer, Murray Fahey, in his first viewing, identifies the large demographic audience attending, including Greek, Arabic and Australian, with an aged audience of six to 75 years.

The film was successful at international audiences at the Santa Barbara International Film Festival and the Los Angeles Greek Film Festival, as well as theatrical releases and its viewings in the US resulting in "three sold out sessions...putting on more screenings due to demand."

== Film accolades ==
Year	Award Ceremony	Category	Nominee	Result	Ref.
2016	Casting Guild of Australia Awards	Best Casting in a Feature Film	Anousha Zarkesh (Casting Director)	Nominated	
2016	Los Angeles Film Festival (LAGFF) Orpheus Award	Best Feature Film	Peter Andrikidis (director)	Nominated	
2016	Santa Barbara International Film Festival	Panavision Spirit Award for Independent Cinema	Peter Andrikidis	Nominated	

== Casting controversy ==
=== Film ===
Following on from his lead role in the stage productions, writer, Alex Lykos, was almost cast as character 'Alex' in the film. He believed he was the right person for the role because he typified and expressed the character well on stage, and would do that on screen. This resulted in difficulties during casting and production, especially given Lykos' age and the age of the 'Alex' character in the film. Lykos instead, plays character 'Stavros' on screen.
