= Peter Andrikidis =

Australian television director and producer

Peter Andrikidis is an Australian film and television director, and producer.

== Early life and education ==
Andrikidis went to the Sydney high school Drummoyne Boys High School in the mid-1970s, where he made a small film called "Nemesis".

He graduated from the Australian Film Television and Radio School (AFTRS) in Film Direction in 1981.

== Career ==
Immediately after graduation from AFTRS, Andrikidis was recruited to Crawford Productions, where he worked on The Flying Doctors.

He moved to the Australian Broadcasting Corporation (ABC), where he worked as director and producer on the medical drama series G.P., which earned him his first Australian Film Institute Award (AFI Award). This was followed by the police drama series Wildside, then two series of the comedy/drama series Grass Roots.

Andrikidis has also directed a number of TV mini-series and telemovies. These included the real life dramatisations My Husband, My Killer (about the murder of Megan Kalajzich), Heroes' Mountain - The Thredbo Story (about the Thredbo landslide), and Jessica, an adaptation of the novel Jessica by Bryce Courtenay, starring Natasha Wanganeen and released in 2004.

In 2004 and 2005, Andrikidis directed five telemovies in the BlackJack series and in 2006 he directed The Incredible Journey of Mary Bryant miniseries, which was a co-production between Network Ten and the British Granada-ITV. In 2007, Andrikidis directed the SBS drama series East West 101 and several episodes of the first series of Underbelly. In 2008, he directed the UK.TV mini-series False Witness and the feature film Wog Boy 2: Kings of Mykonos.

He has also been set-up director of a number of Australian productions, including Embassy, Water Rats, Halifax f.p., The Straits, Bikie Wars: Brothers in Arms, Fat Tony & Co., Janet King, Catching Milat, and American productions which were produced in Australia such as BeastMaster, Farscape and HBO's Serangoon Road.

In 2015, he directed the Australian-produced feature film, Alex & Eve.

In 2019, he directed an episode of the French-American series, Reef Break.

Andrikidis directed Hyde & Seek for MatchBox, Universal NBC and the Nine Network.

== Awards ==
As of June 2020, Andrikidis had won 26 awards and been nominated for 17.

In 2001 he was awarded a Centenary Medal for "Outstanding services to Australian Society and Film Production".
