= 1986 in Australia =

- Monarch: Elizabeth II
- Governor-General: Sir Ninian Stephen
- Prime minister: Bob Hawke
- Population: 16,018,310
- Elections: WA, TAS, QLD

The following lists events that happened during 1986 in Australia.

- Decades: 1960s; 1970s; 1980s; 1990s; 2000s
- See also: 1986 in Australian television; 1986 in Australian literature; Other events of 1986; Timeline of Australian history

== Incumbents ==
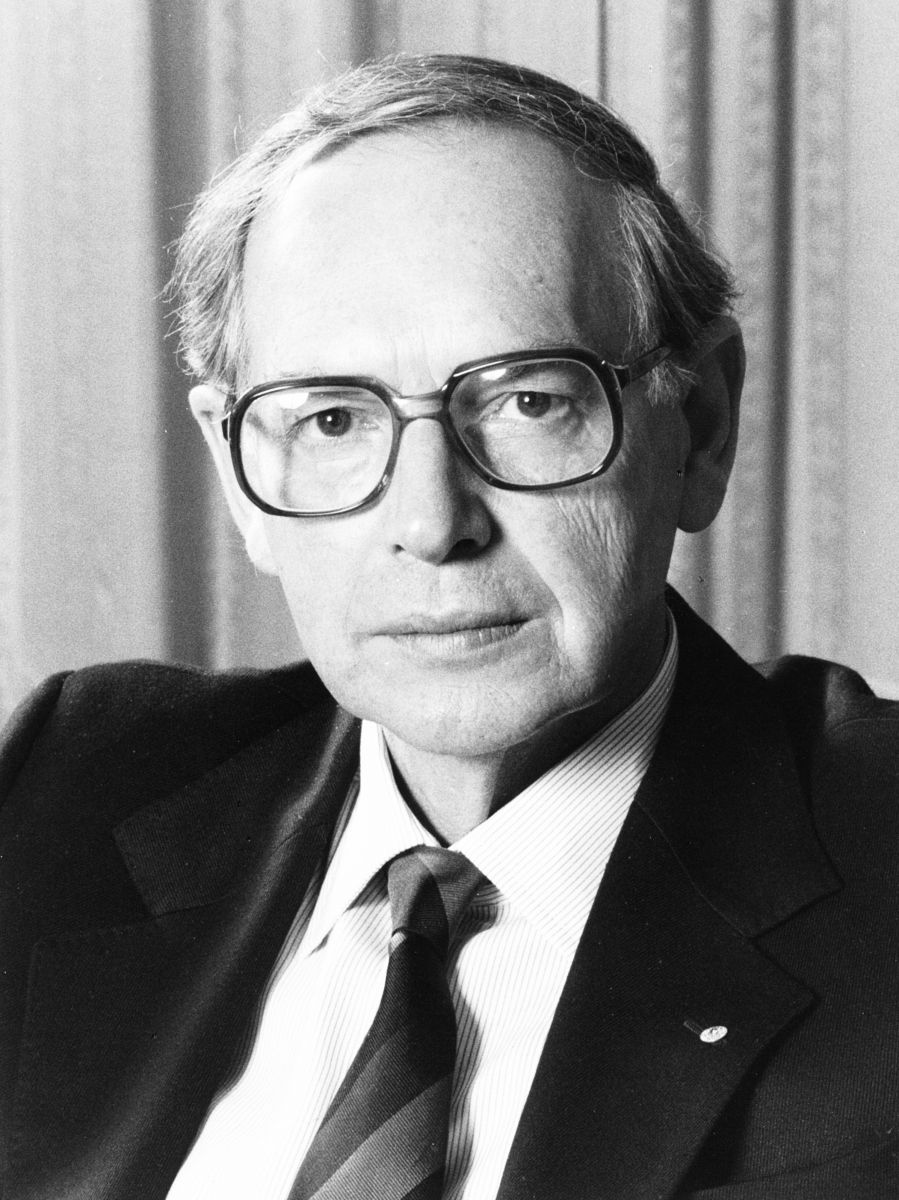
Sir Ninian Stephen

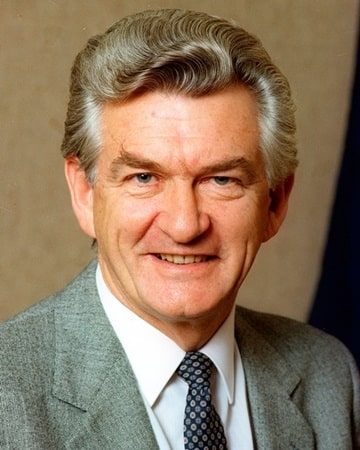
Bob Hawke

- Monarch — Elizabeth II
- Governor-General — Sir Ninian Stephen
- Prime Minister — Bob Hawke
  - Deputy Prime Minister — Lionel Bowen
  - Opposition Leader — John Howard
- Chief Justice — Sir Harry Gibbs

=== State and territory leaders ===
- Premier of New South Wales — Neville Wran (until 4 July), then Barrie Unsworth
  - Opposition Leader — Nick Greiner
- Premier of Queensland — Sir Joh Bjelke-Petersen
  - Opposition Leader — Nev Warburton
- Premier of South Australia — John Bannon
  - Opposition Leader — John Olsen
- Premier of Tasmania — Robin Gray
  - Opposition Leader — Ken Wriedt (until 19 February), then Neil Batt
- Premier of Victoria — John Cain Jr.
  - Opposition Leader — Jeff Kennett
- Premier of Western Australia — Brian Burke
  - Opposition Leader — Bill Hassell (until 25 November), then Barry MacKinnon
- Chief Minister of the Northern Territory — Ian Tuxworth (until 10 May), then Stephen Hatton
  - Opposition Leader — Bob Collins (until 19 August), then Terry Smith
- Chief Minister/President of the Legislative Assembly of Norfolk Island — David Buffett (until 21 May), then John Brown

=== Governors and administrators ===
- Governor of New South Wales — Sir James Rowland
- Governor of Queensland — Sir Walter Campbell
- Governor of South Australia — Sir Donald Dunstan
- Governor of Tasmania — Sir James Plimsoll
- Governor of Victoria — Davis McCaughey (from 18 February)
- Governor of Western Australia — Gordon Reid
- Administrator of Norfolk Island — John Matthew
- Administrator of the Northern Territory — Eric Johnston

== Events ==
=== January ===
- 2 January — A state funeral is held for former Governor of Victoria Sir Henry Winneke at St Paul's Cathedral, Melbourne.
- 3 January — Federal Opposition Leader John Howard introduces a four-point plan to reduce interest rates.
- 4 January — A tanker driver is killed instantly when his truck overturns in Aspen, New South Wales, releasing clouds of nitrogen gas.
- 5 January — Actress Lauren Bacall arrives in Sydney to star in the play Sweet Bird of Youth.

=== February ===
- 2 February — Nurse Anita Cobby is abducted, robbed, raped and murdered by John Travers, Michael Murdoch, and Leslie, Gary and Michael Murphy at Prospect in Sydney (all five men are sentenced to life imprisonment without parole, June 1987).
- 7 February — Following Lindy Chamberlain's identification of a baby's jacket found near Uluru as being similar to the one worn by her baby Azaria, her case takes a new turn.
- 8 February —
  - Elections in Western Australia and Tasmania see the re-election of the ALP in WA, and the Liberal Party in Tasmania.
  - Post-mortem results support the claim of the sister of Sally Anne Huckstep that she was murdered.
  - Dire Straits makes history in Tasmania by drawing the state's biggest audience ever for an open-air concert.
- 9 February — Lindy Chamberlain is released from prison in Darwin on licence after serving 39 months of a life sentence.
- 11 February —
  - Joan Child becomes the first female Speaker of the Australian House of Representatives.
  - More than 100 bushfires burn across the state of Victoria.
- 12 February — Ernie Bridge is elected to the West Australian Cabinet, thereby becoming the first Aborigine to become a Cabinet minister.

=== March ===
- 3 March — The Australia Act 1986 comes into effect at 1600 AEST, granting Australia legal independence from the United Kingdom by removing the power of the Parliament of the United Kingdom to legislate with effect in Australia and its states and territories.
- 18 March — Prime Minister Bob Hawke commits the Federal Government not to raise home interest lending rates above 13.5%, despite continued pressure from the banks.
- 27 March — The Russell Street bombing takes place at the headquarters of Victoria Police in Melbourne. A police constable, Angela Taylor, is killed.

=== April ===
- 2 April — Prime Minister Bob Hawke breaks an election promise by lifting the ceiling on home interest rates, following the banks' promise of an extra $6 million for home loans.
- 11 April — The Arbitration Commission finds that the Builders' Labourers Federation was guilty of serious industrial misconduct and the union is deregistered.
- 14 April — A second trial of Mr. Justice Lionel Murphy begins in Sydney, and lasts for two weeks, with the jury eventually acquitting him.

=== May ===
- 14 May — Responding to the release of dismal current account deficit figures, Federal Treasurer Paul Keating makes his infamous off-the-cuff warning about Australia becoming a "banana republic".

=== July ===
- 4 July — After ten years in power, Neville Wran resigns as Premier of New South Wales, and is replaced by Barrie Unsworth.
- 7 July — Barlow & Chambers are executed at Malaysia's Pudu Prison for drug trafficking. Prime Minister Hawke condemns the move as "barbaric".
- 16 July — An explosion at Moura No. 4 mine in Moura, Queensland kills 12 people.
- 25 July — An unusual cold dry change sweeps through south-eastern Australia, causing temperatures to plummet and bringing 8 centimetres (3.15 in) of snow to Hobart, isolating the city until midday. Canberra also receives snow during the early afternoon with reports of snow and sleet also occurring in the suburbs of Melbourne and Sydney.

=== August ===
- 2 August — The painting The Weeping Woman by Pablo Picasso is stolen from the National Gallery of Victoria. The painting is found undamaged in a locker at Spencer Street station on 19 August.
- 6 August — A low pressure system moving from South Australia and redeveloping off the New South Wales coast dumps a record 327.6 millimetres (12.90 in) of rain in a day on Sydney. Resulting floods kill six people.
- 19 August – Sydney schoolgirl Samantha Knight abducted and murdered by Michael Guider.
- 21 August — Labor Caucus votes 74:42 to resume sales of uranium to France.

=== September ===
- 23 September — Federal Opposition Leader John Howard is suspended from the Australian House of Representatives for 24 hours after attacking Federal Treasurer Paul Keating for huge travel expenses incurred by claiming Sydney as his principal place of residence.

=== October ===
- 8 October — Following three years of wage indexation, the Australian Council of Trade Unions (ACTU) approves a two-tier wage-fixing system.
- 17 October — Brisbane loses bid to host 1992 Olympic Games to the Spanish city of Barcelona.
- 21 October — The Mr. Justice Lionel Murphy saga comes to a close when he dies of cancer.
- 24 October — The last link of the national microwave telephone system is completed at Kununurra in Western Australia.

=== November ===
- 1 November — The 1986 Queensland state election is held. Joh Bjelke-Petersen wins his final election as Premier of Queensland with his party, the National Party gaining 38.6% of the vote and an absolute majority of seats in the Queensland Parliament
- 24 November — Pope John Paul II becomes the second pontiff to tour Australia, arriving in Canberra and then touring
- 27 November — Federal Treasurer Paul Keating is found liable to a fine of $4,000 for not lodging his tax return for 1985 and his 1986 return being overdue.

=== December ===
- 10 December — Senator George Georges resigns from the Australian Labor Party over uranium mining and the proposed ID card (Australia Card).
- 26 December — Tuning into rural disenchantment, Queensland Premier Sir Joh Bjelke-Petersen contemplates the notion of entering the federal political scene.

== Arts and literature ==
- Elizabeth Jolley's novel The Well wins the Miles Franklin Award

== Film ==
- 30 April — Crocodile Dundee is released in Australia. The film will go on to become a worldwide smash hit, becoming the highest grossing Australian until 2015
- Malcolm
- The Fringe Dwellers

== Law ==
- Re Loubie a case involving the Queensland Bail Act and s.117 of the constitution.

== Music ==
- Before Too Long
- Devils in Heaven rock band formed (as Dinner Time).
- Don't Dream It's Over
- Stimulation
- You're the Voice

== Television ==
- 5 January — SBS ceases VHF transmissions on Channel 0 in Sydney & Melbourne.
- 20 January — Neighbours makes its debut on Network Ten & comes to dominate the 7 pm weeknight timeslot.
- February — Red Symons signs to Hey Hey It's Saturday as the show launches Red Faces.
- 30 October — The Movie Show begins on SBS.
- December — The Herald and Weekly Times Ltd, owners of HSV-7 & ADS-7 are sold to Rupert Murdoch's News Limited for $1.8 billion. As News Limited owned ATV-10 at this time, HSV-7 is sold to Fairfax (already owners of ATN-7 & BTQ-7) in February 1987 for $320 million.
- Christopher Skase's Qintex company sells TVQ-0 to Darling Downs Television, owners of DDQ-10 in Toowoomba.
- AUSSAT satellites are launched, bringing television to remote areas for the first time.

== Sport ==
- 16 March — Parramatta Stadium is opened. The Parramatta Eels defeat the St. George Dragons 36–6.
- 23 March — Robert de Castella is once again Australia's best finisher at the IAAF World Cross Country Championships, this time staged in Neuchâtel, Switzerland. He finishes in 14th place (36:10.9) in the long-distance race over 12,000 metres.
- 8 June — Stephen Austin wins the men's national marathon title, clocking 2:15:59 in Sydney, while Margaret Reddan claims the women's title in 2:48:28.
- 29 June — Last game of rugby league is played at the Sydney Sports Ground. Eastern Suburbs Roosters defeat the North Sydney Bears 21–14.
- 27 September — Hawthorn (16.14.110) defeats Carlton (9.14.68) in the 1986 VFL Grand Final to win the 90th VFL premiership.
- 28 September —
  - Minor premiers Parramatta Eels defeat the Canterbury Bulldogs 4–2 in the lowest scoring grand final in history to win the 79th NSWRL premiership. It is the Eels' most recent premiership win. The Illawarra Steelers finish in last position, claiming their second straight wooden spoon.
  - The Clive Churchill Medal, made to honour the late Clive Churchill (who died the previous year), is awarded to its inaugural recipient, Parramatta Eels halfback Peter Sterling.
- 4 November — At Talaq wins Melbourne Cup ridden by Michael Clarke.
- Brownlow Medal awarded to Robert DiPierdomenico (Hawthorn) and Greg Williams (Sydney)
- Farrier Command 10 "Aussie" was constructed and launched.

== Births ==
=== January ===
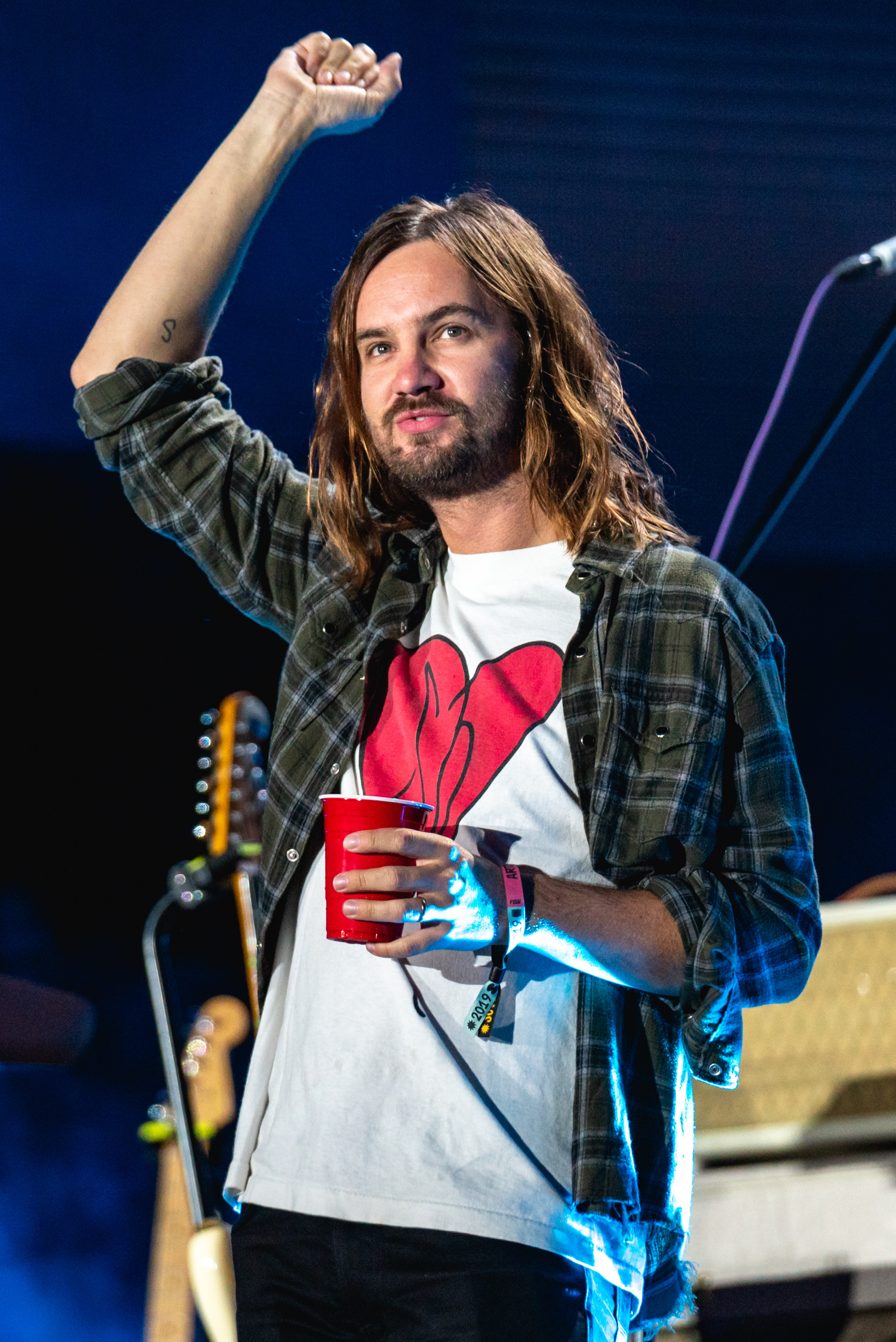
Kevin Parker

- 7 January – Shane Alexander, volleyball player
- 8 January – Scott Anderson, rugby player
- 9 January – Paul Benz, Paralympic athlete
- 10 January – Des Abbott, field hockey player
- 14 January – Sam Butler, footballer
- 20 January
  - Dave Dennis, rugby player
  - Okwy Diamondstar, footballer
  - Kevin Parker, singer/songwriter and guitarist
- 21 January – Kirin J. Callinan, singer/songwriter and guitarist
- 23 January – Joseph Brennan, author
- 26 January – Andrew Dodt, golfer
- 28 January – Nathan Outteridge, sailor

=== February ===
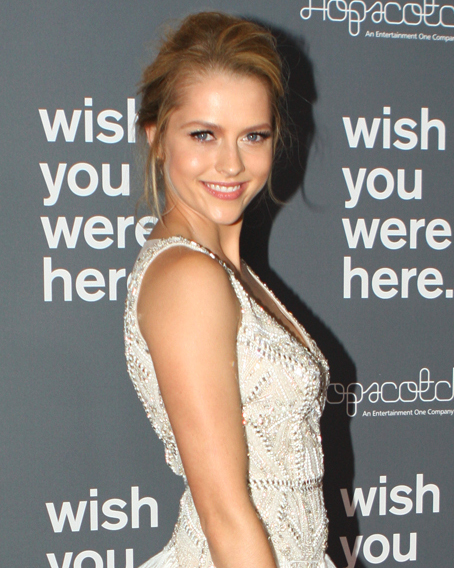
Teresa Palmer

- 3 February – Selasi Berdie, rugby player
- 4 February – Jackie Barnes, drummer for Rose Tattoo
- 8 February – Scott Arnold, squash player
- 9 February – Marieke D'Cruz, swimmer
- 10 February – Ben Davies, footballer
- 12 February – Johanna Allston, orienteer
- 14 February
  - Daniel Conn, model and rugby player
  - Cameron Crombie, Paralympic shot putter and javelin thrower
- 17 February – Scott Daruda, rugby player
- 20 February – Shannon Ashlyn, actress
- 22 February
  - David Barnes, Olympic archer
  - Zac Dawson, footballer
  - Josh Helman, actor
  - Joel Brunker, boxer
- 23 February
  - Troy Chaplin, footballer
  - Kate Keltie, actress
- 26 February
  - Lichelle Clarke, Paralympic swimmer
  - Teresa Palmer, actress, writer, model and film producer
- 27 February – Jayden Attard, footballer
- 28 February – Tendai Mzungu, footballer

=== March ===
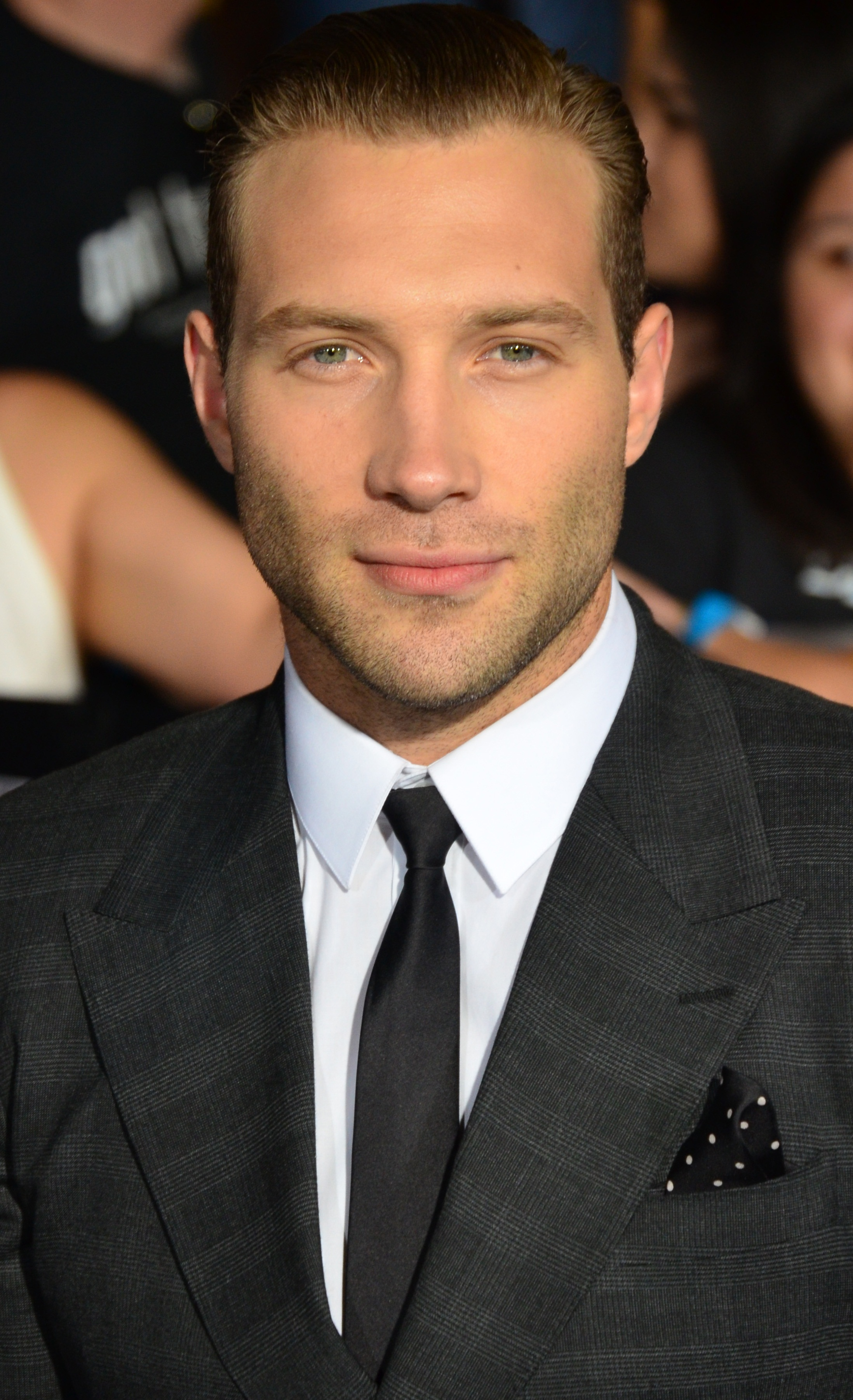
Jai Courtney

- 1 March – Kathryn Beck, actress
- 3 March – Catherine Cannuli, soccer player and coach
- 7 March – Shannon Cox, footballer
- 8 March – Michelle Steele, athlete
- 13 March – Gillian Alexy, actress
- 14 March – Trent Copeland, cricketer
- 15 March – Jai Courtney, actor
- 17 March – Chelsea Baker, rugby player
- 18 March – Arlo Bugeja, speedway rider
- 19 March – Daniel Dillon, basketball player
- 20 March
  - Ruby Rose, actress, model, and television presenter
  - Dean Geyer, actor, singer and Australian Idol contestant
- 22 March – Andrew Barisic, footballer
- 26 March – Jessica Hart, model
- 27 March – Joshua Allison, wheelchair basketball player
- 28 March – Richard Cardozo, footballer

=== April ===
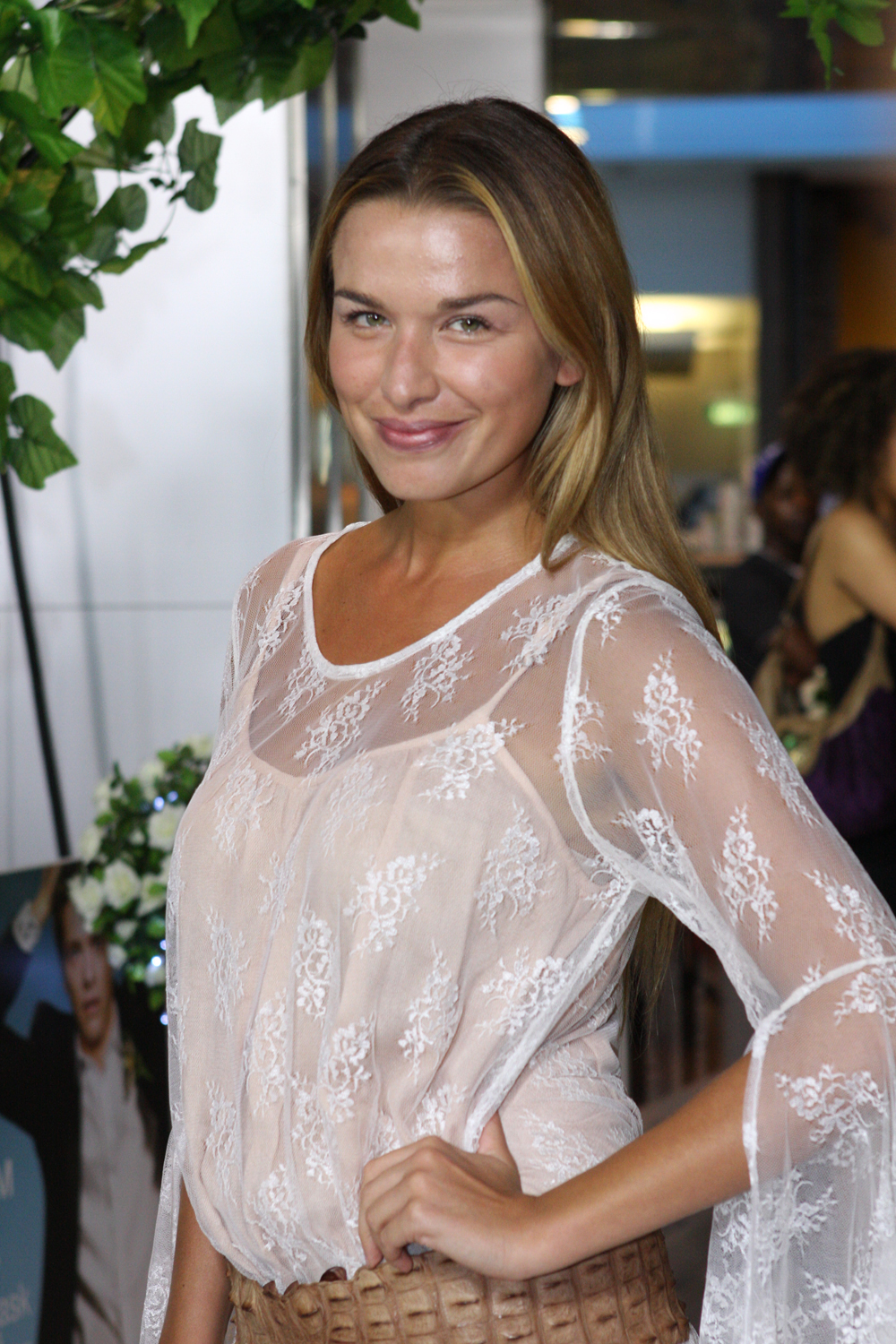
Tahyna Tozzi

- 1 April – James Albury, baseball player
- 3 April – Burt Cockley, cricketer
- 4 April
  - Steven Brown, judoka personnel
  - Bevan Calvert, handball player
  - Erin Carroll, badminton player
- 11 April
  - Hayley Aitken, pop singer/songwriter
  - Ashley Delaney, Olympic swimmer
- 16 April
  - Miles Armstrong, tennis player
  - Bronwen Knox, water polo player
- 24 April – Tahyna Tozzi, model, singer and actress
- 29 April – Danny Clayton, television and radio presenter

=== May ===
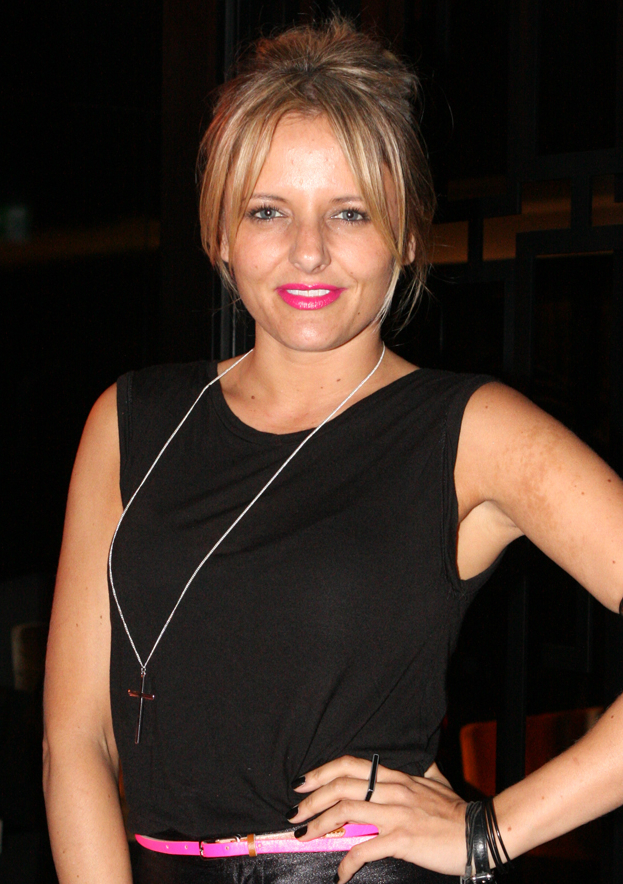
Zoë Badwi

- 1 May – Adam Casey footballer
- 4 May – Zoë Badwi, singer/songwriter, model, and actress
- 7 May – Mark Furze, actor and singer
- 9 May – Kirby Bentley, footballer
- 16 May – Paul Carroll, volleyball player
- 23 May – Marcus Allan, footballer
- 28 May
  - Berrick Barnes, rugby union player
  - Chris Bond, wheelchair rugby player
- 30 May – Thomas Do Canto, long distance runner

=== June ===
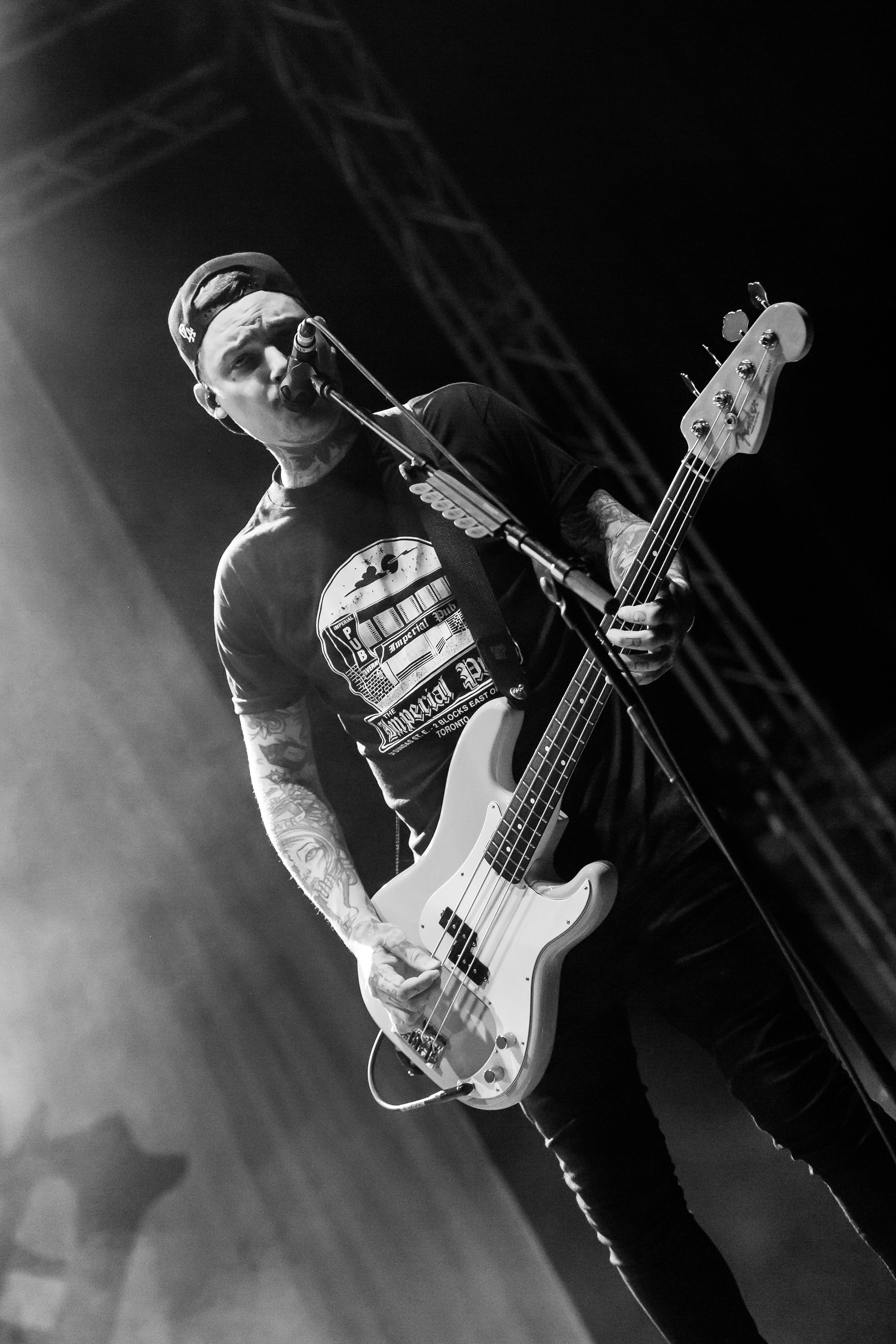
Ahren Stringer

- 2 June
  - Todd Carney, rugby player
  - Pekahou Cowan, rugby player
- 5 June – Ahren Stringer, musician, bassist and singer for The Amity Affliction (2003-2025)
- 6 June – Nathan van Berlo, footballer
- 12 June
  - Benjamin Schmideg, actor
  - Harry Taylor, footballer
- 15 June – Ronnie Buckley, discus thrower
- 29 June – Christopher Egan, actor

=== July ===
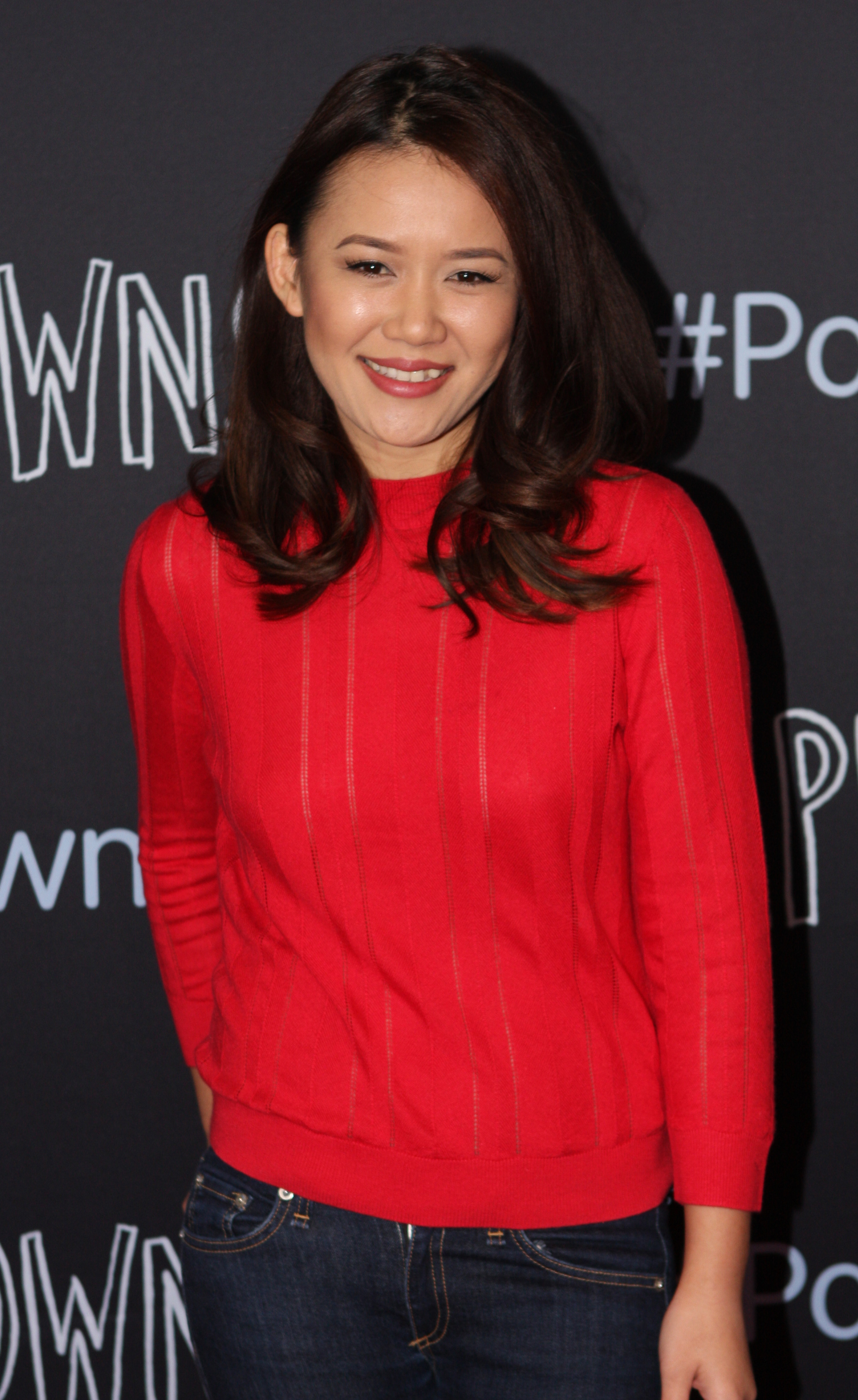
Natalie Tran

- 4 July – Leah Blayney, footballer and coach
- 8 July – Timothy Cox, baseball player
- 11 July
  - Bryn Coudraye, Olympic rower
  - Rebecca Dwyer, field hockey player
- 12 July
  - 360, rapper
  - Krystal Forscutt, reality TV star
- 14 July – Nic Beveridge, Paralympic triathlete
- 16 July – Leith Brodie, swimmer
- 18 July
  - Simon Clarke, Olympic cyclist
  - James Sorensen, actor
- 24 July
  - Natalie Tran, comedian
  - Remy Hii, Malaysian-born actor
- 25 July – Travis Baird, footballer
- 28 July – Karyn Bailey, netball player
- 29 July – Scott Dureau, rugby player

=== August ===
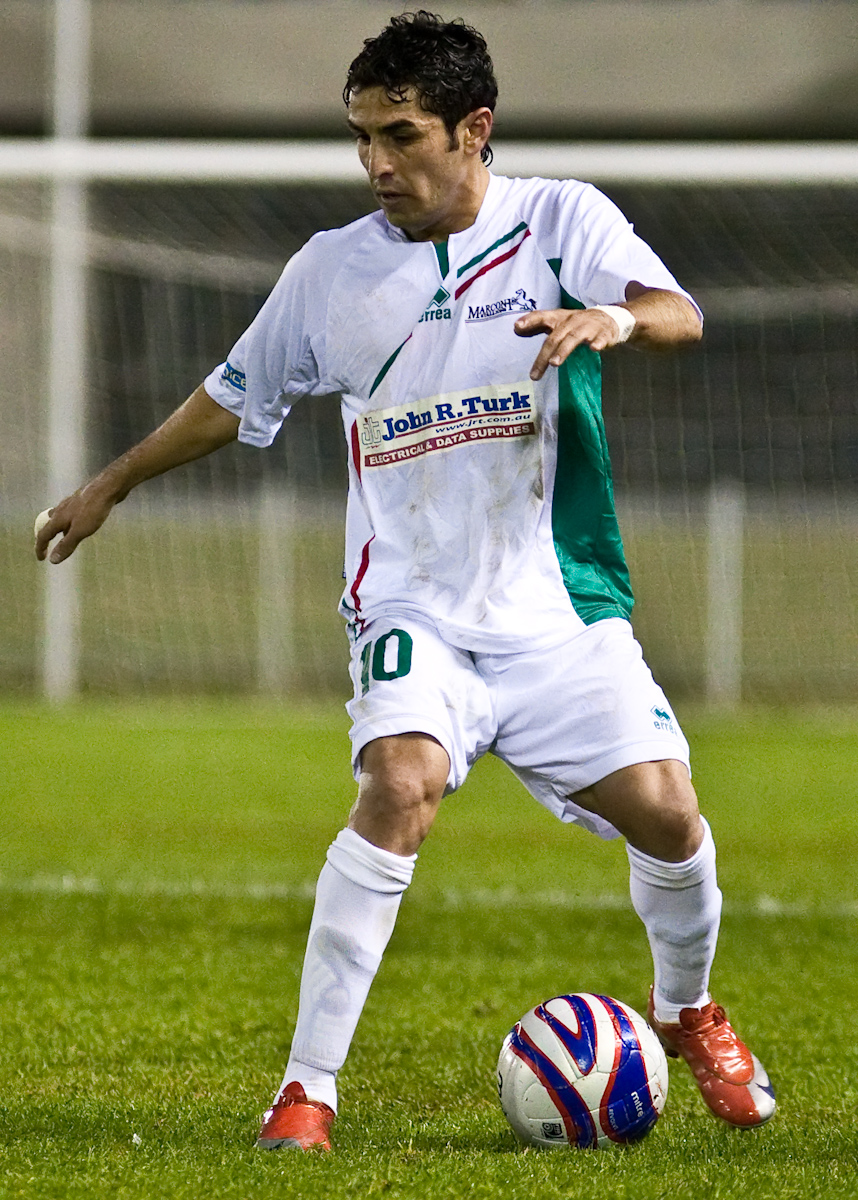
Ali Abbas

- 1 August – Mikaela Dombkins, basketball player and coach
- 3 August – Ryan Brabazon, footballer
- 8 August – Alex Cudlin, motorcycle racer
- 10 August – Mia-Rae Clifford, footballer
- 12 August – Chris Adams, rugby player
- 14 August – Nigel Boogaard, footballer
- 16 August – Felicity Abram, triathlete
- 18 August – Anthony Alozie, Nigerian-born track and field sprinter
- 19 August – Adam Cockshell, footballer
- 21 August – Patrick Dellit, rugby player
- 22 August – Shane Cross, skateboarder (d. 2007)
- 28 August
  - Briggs, rapper, record label owner, comedy writer, actor, and author
  - Sarah Christophers, actress
  - Tommy Dassalo, comedian
  - James Davison, racing driver
  - Sam Dwyer, footballer
- 30 August – Ali Abbas, Iraqi-born footballer
- 31 August
  - Chloe Boreham, actress
  - Melanie Schlanger, freestyle swimmer

=== September ===
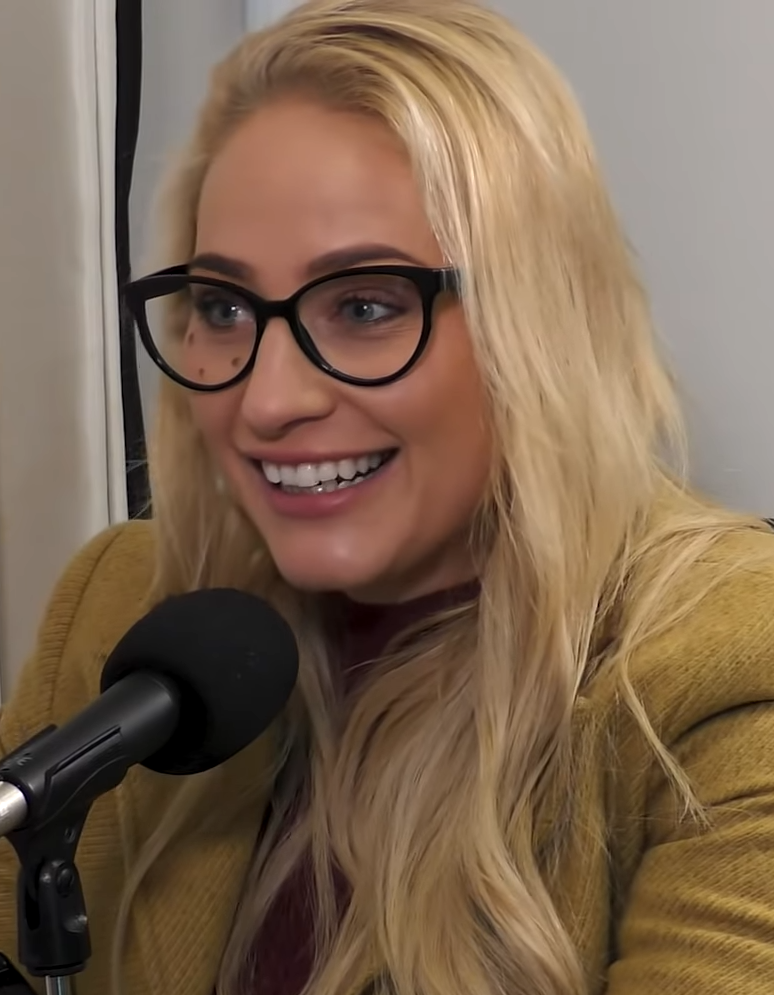
Ebanie Bridges

- 4 September – Liam Adams, Olympic runner
- 8 September – Brett Anderson, rugby player
- 10 September
  - Laura Attard, footballer
  - Cheyenne Campbell, rugby player
- 18 September – Eloise Mignon, actress
- 19 September
  - Ben Demery, Paralympic tandem cyclist
  - Sally Pearson, Olympic hurdler
- 22 September – Ebanie Bridges, boxer
- 23 September – Wade Dutton, baseball player
- 29 September – Greg Broughton, footballer

=== October ===
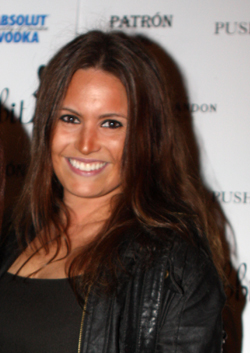
Christie Hayes

- 1 October
  - Prashanth Sellathurai, gymnast
  - Justin Westhoff, footballer
- 4 October – James Brooke, DJ and radio host
- 10 October
  - Julie Corletto, netball player
  - Nathan Jawai, basketball player
- 13 October – Sarah Calati, Paralympic wheelchair tennis player
- 14 October – Nicholas Colla, actor, writer, and director
- 15 October – Tony Caine, rugby player
- 16 October – Peter George, cricketer
- 18 October – Renee Bargh, entertainment reporter
- 20 October
  - Adam D'Apuzzo, footballer
  - Elyse Taylor, model
- 21 October – Candice Dianna, singer/songwriter, voice actress, and record producer
- 23 October – Max Bailey, footballer and coach
- 27 October – David Warner, cricketer
- 30 October – Adam Gibson, basketball player
- 31 October
  - Chris Alajajian, Australian-born Armenian race car driver
  - Christie Hayes, actress

=== November ===
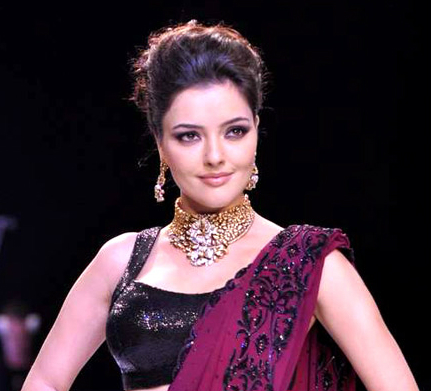
Kristina Akheeva

- 1 November – Kristina Akheeva, Russian-born actress and model
- 2 November – Lara Sacher, actress
- 5 November – Nathan Crawford, baseball player
- 9 November – Luke Blackwell, footballer
- 10 November – James Aspey, animal rights activist and lecturer
- 19 November
  - Renae Camino, basketball player
  - Brad Hill, basketball player
  - Jessicah Schipper, swimmer
- 26 November
  - Eddie Betts, footballer
  - Tom Cooper, Australian-born Dutch cricketer

=== December ===
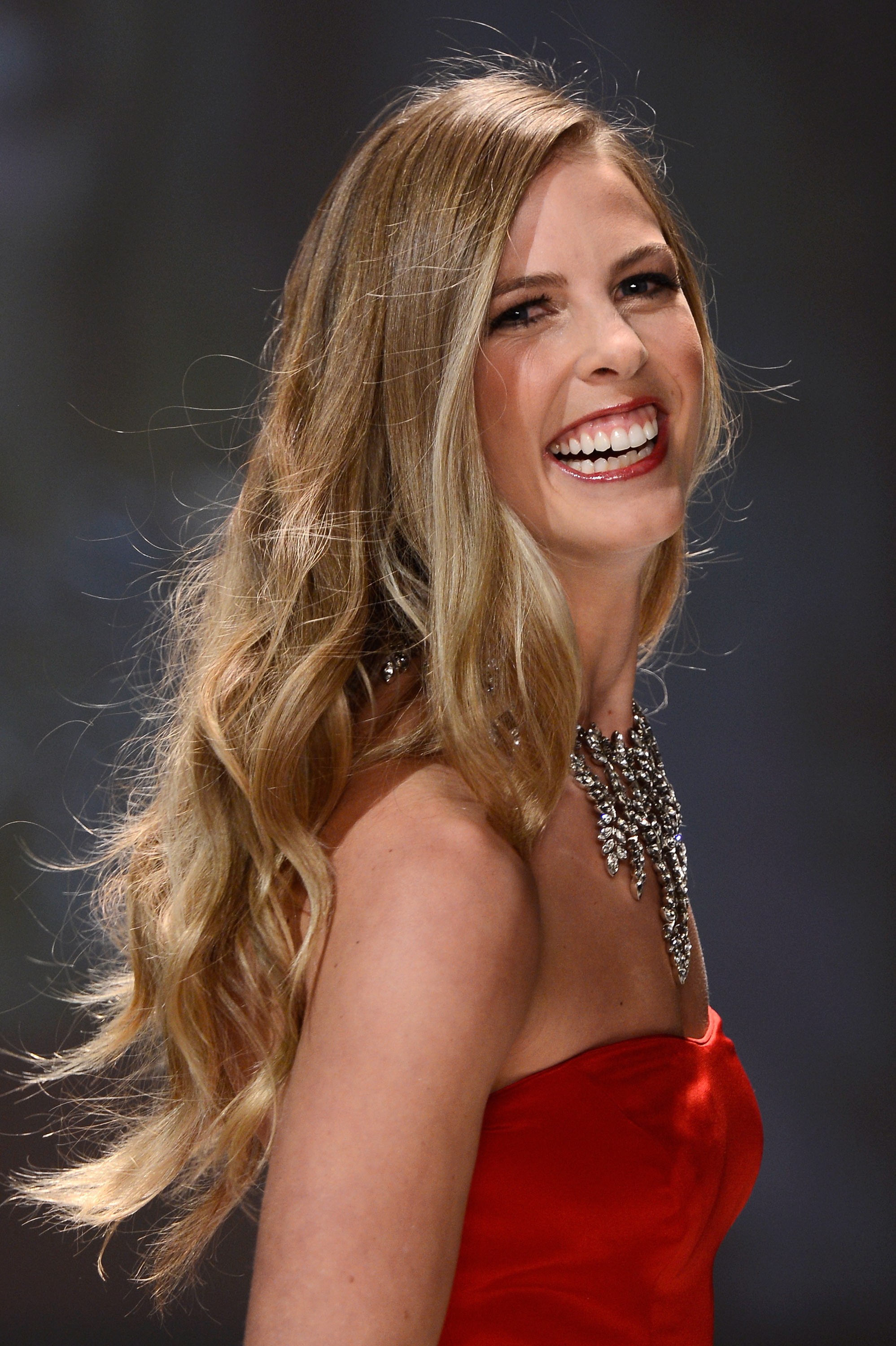
Torah Bright

- 8 December – Lara Carroll, English-born Olympic swimmer
- 9 December
  - Aron Baynes, basketball player
  - Johannah Curran, netball player
- 10 December – Joshua Adams, dancesport competitor
- 11 December – Jackson Bird, cricketer
- 14 December – James Aubusson, rugby player
- 19 December
  - Luke Cook, actor, director, writer, and content creator
  - Gemma Pranita, actress
- 21 December – Davey Browne, boxer (d. 2015)
- 22 December
  - Dennis Armfield, footballer
  - Arianne Caoili, Filipino-born chess player (d. 2020)
- 23 December – Beau Champion, rugby player
- 27 December – Torah Bright, snowboarder
- 29 December – Chris Cayzer, singer and actor
- 30 December – Tara Cheyne, politician

=== Full date unknown ===
- Abdul Abdullah, artist
- Zane Banks, guitarist
- Ali Barter, pop rock singer/songwriter
- Graeme Begbie, field hockey player
- Alexander Campbell, ballet dancer
- Joel Carroll, field hockey player
- Melanie Cheng, doctor and author
- Nadia Clancy, politician
- Jesse Cox, radio producer, broadcaster, and documentary maker (d. 2017)
- Michael Czugaj, glazier and convicted drug trafficker

== Deaths ==
- 21 October — Lionel Murphy (born 1922), former Attorney-General of Australia and High Court judge
- 7 November — Tracy Pew (born 1957), bass guitarist for The Birthday Party
- 12 December – Buddy Williams (born 1918), country musician

== See also ==
- 1986 in Australian television
- List of Australian films of 1986
