= List of Australian films of 1986 =

== 1986 ==
Title	Director	Cast	Genre	Notes
100% Wool	Tony Mahood	Rowena Mohr, Nick Giannopoulos, James Cox	Comedy / Short	IMDb
Alice to Nowhere	John Power	John Waters, Steve Jacobs, Rosey Jones	Crime / Drama / Horror	IMDb
The Australian Image	Graham Shirley	Bill Hunter		IMDb
BabaKiueria	Don Featherstone	Michelle Torres, Bob Maza	Drama / Short	IMDb
Backlash	Bill Bennett	David Argue, Gia Carides, Lydia Miller, Brian Syron, Anne Smith, Gregory McMahon, Anthony Holmes, Don Smith, Jennifer Cluff	Crime / Drama Feature film	IMDb
The Blue Lightning	Lee Philips	Sam Elliott, Rebecca Gilling, Robert Culp, John Meillon, Robert Coleby, Max Phipps, Ernie Dingo, Ray Meagher, Norman Erskine	Adventure / Action / Drama / Thriller TV film US Co-production	
Cactus	Paul Cox	Isabelle Huppert, Robert Menzies, Norman Kaye, Monica Maughan, Banduk Marika, Sheila Florance, Julia Blake, Ray Marshall, Maurie Fields, Tony Llewellyn-Jones, Sean Scully	Drama Feature film	IMDb
Call Me Mr. Brown	Scott Hicks	Chris Haywood, Vincent Ball, Russel Kiefel, John Polson, John Frawley, Max Cullen, Edwin Hodgeman, Patrick Frost, Brenton Whittle, Ken Goodlet, Grant Piro, Bill Hunter	Crime / Comedy Feature film	
Cassandra	Colin Eggleston	Tessa Humphries, Shane Briant, Kit Taylor, Lee James, Briony Behets, Susan Barling, Tim Burns, Natalie McCurry, Jeff Watson, Kate Carruthers, Gary Trail, Tegan Charles, Dylan O'Neill	Horror / Thriller Feature film	IMDb
Coming of Age	Brian Jones	Angela Menzies-Wills, David Evans, Mark Neal	Comedy	IMDb
Crocodile Dundee	Peter Faiman	Paul Hogan, Linda Kozlowski, John Meillon, David Gulpilil, Mark Blum, Ritchie Singer, Maggie Blinco, Michael Lombard, Steve Rackman	Adventure / Comedy / Drama Feature film	IMDb
Dead-End Drive In	Brian Trenchard-Smith	Ned Manning, Natalie McCurry, Peter Whitford, Brett Climo, Ollie Hall, Wilbur Wilde	Action / Horror / Sci-fi Feature film	IMDb
Death of a Soldier	Philippe Mora	James Coburn, Bill Hunter, Reb Brown, Maurie Fields, Belinda Davey, Max Fairchild, Michael Pate, Frank Thring, Terence Donovan	Crime / Drama / War Feature film	IMDb
Departure	Brian Kavanagh	Patricia Kennedy, Michael Duffield, June Jago, Serge Lazareff, Jon Sidney, Sally Cahill, Bettina Welch, Barry Quin, Peter Dunn, Barbara Warner, Sally Catall, Sean Scully	Drama Feature film	IMDb aka: "A Pair of Claws"
Dot and Keeto	Yoram Gross	Robyn Moore, Keith Scott, Ashley Ayre	Children / Animation	IMdb
Dot and the Whale	Yoram Gross	Kim Deacon, Robyn Moore, Keith Scott	Children / Animation	IMDb
Double Sculls	Ian Gilmour	John Hargreaves, Chris Haywood, Bill Kerr	Adventure	IMDb
Emma's War	Clytie Jessop	Lee Remick, Miranda Otto, Mark Lee	Drama	IMDb
The Fish Are Safe	Noni Hazlehurst	Michele Fawdon, Peter Cummins, Grant Spiteri, Alan Fletcher, Vivean Gray, Frank Gallacher, Mickie Camilleri, Mike Bishop, Danny Nash, Penelope Shelton, Jane Menelaus	Romance ABC TV film	
For Love Alone	Stephen Wallace	Helen Buday, Sam Neill, Hugo Weaving, Huw Williams, Hugh Keays-Byrne, Odile Le Clezio, Kate Raison, Nick Opolski, John Polson, Linden Wilkinson, Judi Farr	History / Romance Feature film	IMDb Entered into the 37th Berlin International Film Festival
Fortress	Arch Nicholson	Rachel Ward, Vernon Wells	Horror	IMDb
Frenchman's Farm	Ron Way	Tracey Tainsh, David Reyne, Ray Barrett, Norman Kaye, Andrew Blackman, Phil Brock, John Meillon, Penny Jones	Horror / Mystery / Thriller Feature film	
The Fringe Dwellers	Bruce Beresford	Justine Saunders, Kristina Nehm, Bob Maza, Kyle Benning, Dennis Walker, Kath Walker, Ernie Dingo	Drama Feature film	IMDb, entered into the 1986 Cannes Film Festival
Frog Dreaming	Brian Trenchard-Smith	Henry Thomas	Drama	IMDb
Gallagher's Travels	Michael Caulfield	Ivar Kants, Joanne Samuel, Stuart Campbell, Jennifer Hagan, Frances Yin, Sylvester Iwinski, Kym Lynch, Laurence Hodge, David Clendenning, Ian Cope, Danny Underwood	Adventure / Comedy / Romance TV film	
Going Sane	Michael Robertson	John Waters, Judy Morris, Linda Cropper, Kate Raison, Frank Wilson, Jim Holt, Brett Climo, Tim Robertson	Comedy Feature film	IMDb
A Halo for Athuan	Alan Burke	Gwen Plumb, Ron Haddrick, Fiona Stewart, Tim Elliot, Danny Caretti, Tom Farley, Basil Clarke, Saviour Sammut, David Morris, Fred Steele, Denise Roberts, Dane Carson	Comedy / Drama ABC TV film	aka Athuan / The Book Of Athuan
The Hour Before My Brother Dies	James Clayden	Peter Hehir, Rhonda Wilson, Reg Evans, Margot Duell	Drama ABC TV film	
Hunger	Stephen Wallace	Brendan Higgins, Melita Jurisic, Ken Lawrence, Corinne Bassett, John Bell, Paul Chubb, Briony Behets, Evette Bassett, Robyn Archer, Cathy Downes	Drama ABC TV film	
The Humpty Dumpty Man	P. J. Hogan	Frank Gallacher, Jim Holt, Frederick Parslow, Claire Crowther, Rod Mullinar, Alex English, John Frawley, Deborra-Lee Furness, Kim Gyngell, Sue Jones, Robin Harrison, Frankie J Holden	Drama / Thriller Feature film	IMDb
Jackson's Crew	Michael Rodger	John Bowman, Penny Jones, Cae Rees, Greg Powells, Rebecca Cogzill, Andrew Booth, Ove Altman, Jenny Hall, David Clendenning	Drama / Family TV film / TV Pilot	
Jenny Kissed Me	Brian Trenchard-Smith	Ivar Kants, Deborra-Lee Furness, Tamsin West	Drama	IMDb
Just Us	Gordon Glenn	Scott Burgess, Catherine McClements, Merfyn Owen, Gina Riley, Jay Mannering, Kim Gyngell, Marie Redshaw, Richard Moss, Dennis Moore, Judith Graham	Crime / Romance TV film	IMDb
Kangaroo	Tim Burstall	Colin Friels, Judy Davis, John Walton, Julie Nihill, Hugh Keays-Byrne, Peter Hehir, Peter Cummins, David Hutchins, Tim Robertson	Drama / Romance Feature film	IMDb, Entered into the 15th Moscow International Film Festival
Kidnapped	Geoff Collins	Tom Burlinson, Matthew Fargher, Wallas Eaton	Animation / Adventure	IMDb
Landslides	Sarah Gibson, Susan Lambert		Documentary	IMDb
The Last Warhorse	Bob Meillon	Graham Dow, Robert Carlton, Olivia Martin, Kristen Vergia, Ritchie Singer, Kurt Schneider, Kenji Konda, Kazue Matsumoto	Drama / Family TV film	
Le Corps imagé	Stephen Cummins		Short	IMDb
The Local Rag	Keith Wilkes	Maggie Millar, Peter Cummins	Drama	IMDb
Malcolm	Nadia Tass	Colin Friels, Lindy Davies, Chris Haywood, John Hargreaves, Charles 'Bud' Tingwell, Beverley Phillips, Heather Mitchell, Ian McFadyen, Denise Scott,	Comedy / Crime Feature film	IMDb
Man and Boy	John Clarke	Terry Gill, Frank Magree, Cliff Ellen, John Clarke	Short	IMDb
Marauders	Mark Savage	Zero Montana, Colin Savage, Megan Spencer, Janie Fearon, Sam Davies, Sonia Berton, Richard Wolstencroft, Paul Harrington	Horror / Thriller Feature film	IMDb
The More Things Change...	Robyn Nevin	Judy Morris, Barry Otto, Victoria Longley	Drama	IMDb
My Letter to George	Michael Laughlin	Jodie Foster, John Lithgow, Michael Murphy, Dan Shor, Harry Andrews	Drama	IMDb Aka: "Mesmerized"
My Life Without Steve	Gillian Leahy	Jennifer Vuletic	Drama / Short	IMDb
Played in Australia		Margreta Elkins, Thomas Edmonds	Documentary	IMDb
Playing Beatie Bow	Donald Crombie	Peter Phelps, Imogen Annesley, Mouche Phillips, Nikki Coghill, Moya O'Sullivan, Don Barker, Su Cruickshank, Lyndel Rowe, Barbara Stephens	Drama / Historical / Romance Feature film	IMDb
Raoul Wallenberg: Between the Lines	Karin Altmann		Biography	AFI award
Shark's Paradise	Michael Jenkins	David Reyne, Sally Tayler, Ron Becks, John Paramor, Peter Sumner, Peter Gwynne, Dennis Miller, Ralph Cotterill, Lynda Stoner, Sean Scully, Howard Mungo	Action / Drama / Thriller TV film / TV Pilot	
Short Changed	George Ogilvie	David Kennedy, Susan Leith, Jamie Agius	Drama	IMDb
A Single Life	John Power	Tina Bursill, Steven Jacobs, Jane Clifton, Pamela Rabe, Tony Rickards, Terence Donovan, John Higginson, Esben Storm	Drama / Romance ABC TV film	aka Below The Belt (Melbourne)
Sky Pirates	Colin Eggleston	John Hargreaves, Meredith Phillips, Max Phipps	Adventure / Sci-Fi	IMDb
Starview	Patrick Flanagan	Oriana Panozzo, Tony Álvarez	Sci-Fi	IMDb
The Steam-Driven Adventures of Riverboat Bill	Paul Williams	Debby Cumming, Brian Hannan, Frank Thring	Animation / Family	IMDb
The Surfer	Frank Shields	Gary Day, Gosia Dobrowolska, Rod Mullinar, Tony Barry, Gerard Maguire, Stephen Leeder, David Clendenning, Kris McQuade	Action / Drama / Thriller Feature film	IMDb
Time After Time	Bill Hays	John Gielgud, Googie Withers, Helen Cherry, Ursula Howells, Trevor Howard	Comedy	IMDb
Traps	John Hughes	Carolyn Howard, Gwenda Wiseman, Paul Davies, John Flaus, Lesley Stern, Sylvie Le Clezio, Drew Cottle, Peter Sommerfield, Michael Gill	Drama / Thriller Feature film	IMDb
Two Friends	Jane Campion	Kris Bidenko, Emma Coles, Kris McQuade, Debra May, Peter Hehir, Tony Barry, Stephen Leeder, Kim Antonios, John Sheerin, Denise Roberts, Steve Bisley	Drama ABC TV film	IMDb, Screened at the 1986 Cannes Film Festival
Windrider	Vincent Monton	Tom Burlinson, Nicole Kidman, Charles 'Bud' Tingwell, Jill Perryman, Simon Chilvers, Kim Bullad, Stig Wemyss, Mark Williams	Action / Drama / Romance Feature film	IMDb Making Waves (Title in Perth, Western Australia)
Zombie Brigade	Carmelo Musca, Barrie Pattison	John Moore, Khym Lam, Geoffrey Gibbs, Adam Wong, Leslie Wright, Bob Faggetter, Michael Fuller, Graeme Rattigan, Brian Fitzsimmons, Maggie Wilde West	Horror Feature film	IMDb

== See also ==
- 1986 in Australia
- 1986 in Australian television
