= Josh Adams =

Josh Adams may refer to:

- Josh Adams (comics) (born 1987), American comic book and commercial artist
- Josh Adams (American football) (born 1996), American football player in the NFL for the New York Jets
- Josh Adams (basketball) (born 1993), professional basketball player
- Josh Adams (rugby union) (born 1995), Welsh rugby union winger

== See also ==
- Joshua Adams (born 1986), Australian Dancesport competitor
