= Shane Alexander =

Shane Alexander can refer to:

- Shane Alexander, 2nd Earl Alexander of Tunis, British peer
- Shane Alexander (musician), American musician
- Shane Alexander (volleyball), Australian volleyball player

== See also ==
- Shane Alexander Thomson
