= Rise (Devils in Heaven album) =

Compilation album by Devils in Heaven
- Released: 25 June 2021
- Recorded: 1990–1998
- Studio: Powerhouse Recordings, Festival Studios, ATA Studios, Boulevard Sound, David Whitney's Studio
- Genre: Australian rock, pop rock, adult orientated rock, heavy harmony rock, hard rock
- Label: AOR Heaven
- Producer: Peter Blyton, Garry Frost, Arthur Payson, David Whitney

Devils in Heaven chronology
Liberation (1993)	Rise (2021)

Rise is the first compilation album by the Australian rock band Devils in Heaven, released on 25 June 2021. The band separated in 1993. The album is a compilation of recordings the band made between 1990 and 1998, and was released on CD format through German record company AOR Heaven.

== Background ==
Early in 2021, Devils in Heaven were approached by the German record label, AOR Heaven, in the hopes of releasing their back catalogue on CD. Having never had an album release and after breaking up twenty-eight years ago, the band was perplexed at how this opportunity had come about. Apparently the band had built up a following in Europe over the internet in the ensuing years by music lovers who are passionate about adult orientated heavy harmony rock. It was because their music was so hard to purchase that there was enough of an interest to warrant a full album release.

Although the band had written and performed a wealth of original material, the actual release quality recordings that existed were quite limited. The band decided to combine recordings from four different sources for the release: "Take Me", "Ships In The Night" (1990 version) and "Ain't It A Wonder" (1990 version) were demos recorded in 1990 at Powerhouse Recordings in Alexandria, N.S.W.; "Say A Prayer" and "The Night Is Over" were recorded in 1992 at Festival Studios in Pyrmont and ATA Studios in Glebe, N.S.W.; "Liberation", "Ships In The Night" and "Ain't It A Wonder" were recorded in 1993 at Boulevard Sound, Hollywood; and "Age", "All Night", "Listen To My Heart", "Dreams", "Your Beating Heart" and "Heart, Mind & Soul" were recorded from 1995 to 1998 at David Whitney's recording studio in Launceston, Tasmania.

Upon its release, Rise was the subject of varying reviews from web sites around the world. Mostly, the reviews came from European countries: the United Kingdom, Spain, Germany, Italy, Austria, Switzerland and the Netherlands.

== Track listing ==
1. "Liberation" – 4:53
2. "The Night Is Over" – 4:07
3. "Take Me" – 4:21
4. "Ain't It A Wonder" – 4:27
5. "Ships In The Night" – 4:17
6. "Say A Prayer" – 3:44
7. "Age (Simple Man)" – 2:24
8. "All Night" – 4:06
9. "Listen To My Heart" – 4:54
10. "Dreams" – 4:50
11. "Your Beating Heart" – 3:49
12. "Heart, Mind & Soul" – 4:27
13. "Ships In The Night" (1990 version, bonus track) – 3:58
14. "Ain't It A Wonder" (1990 version, bonus track) – 4:25
