= Section 117 of the Constitution of Australia =

Discrimination protection

Section 117 of the Constitution of Australia provides protection against discrimination on the basis of state of residence.

Historically, section 117 had been read down by the High Court so as to be devoid of any real meaning. For example, in 1904 it was found that discrimination in favour of people who are "residents of and domiciled in Western Australia" was permissible, as the Constitution only prohibited discrimination on the basis of a person's state of residence, not their state of domicile.

In the 1989 landmark case Street v Queensland Bar Association, the modern approach to interpretation was developed. The court held that the purpose of the section was national unity, and consequentially, residence should be given a broader meaning. In addition, the court overruled a case in which the historical approach was used.

In reaching its conclusion, each of the seven Justices issued a separate opinion. Combining this with the fact that there is little case law referencing section 117, there remains significant debate over the nature and extent of the right contained within it.

== Origins ==
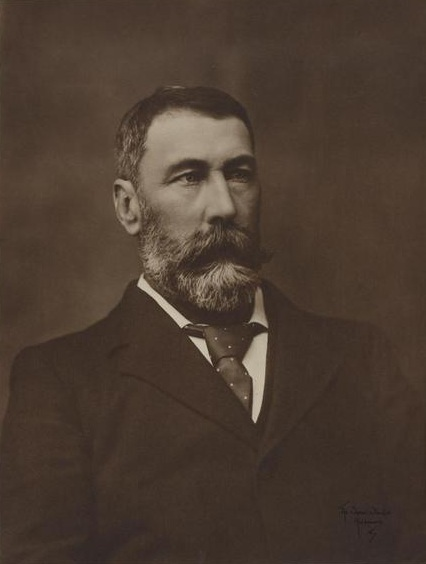
Richard O'Connor, who proposed the wording acceptable to the Convention

Section 117 was inspired by both the Privileges and Immunities Clause and the Privileges or Immunities Clause of the United States Constitution.

The original form of the section, proposed at the 1891 Constitutional Convention, read:

A State shall not make or enforce any law abridging any privilege or immunity of citizens of other States of the Commonwealth, nor shall a State deny to any person, within its jurisdiction, the equal protection of the laws.

At the Melbourne session of the 1897–1898 Constitutional Convention, it was decided that the first part of the section should be removed because it was unclear to the delegates how one state's law could interfere with the privilege or immunity of a citizen of another state, and in addition there was no definition of a Commonwealth citizen. Several attempts were made to define Commonwealth citizenship, none of which were successful.

Richard O'Connor eventually proposed that the clause read:

Every subject of the Queen, resident in any State or part of the Commonwealth, shall be entitled in any other State or part of the Commonwealth to all the privileges and immunities to which he would be entitled if a subject of the Queen resident in that latter State or part of the Commonwealth

But this too was rejected on the grounds that it would be impossible for there to be any practical difference between the rights of citizens by state. Following this, O'Connor made another proposal, which was accepted. After a minor modification, section 117 reached the form that it is in today:

A subject of the Queen, resident in any State, shall not be subject in any other State to any disability or discrimination which would not be equally applicable to him if he were a subject of the Queen resident in such other state.

== Interpretation ==
=== "Subject of the Queen" ===
"Subject of the Queen" has not been definitively defined by the High Court, but for practical purposes, all Australian Citizens are subjects of the Queen. "The Queen" refers to the office of the Queen in right of Australia.

In Street, several of the Justices suggested that, in modern times, "subject of the Queen" was synonymous with "Australian citizen", but ultimately, it was not necessary to decide the question. Similarly, in Singh v Commonwealth of Australia, it was suggested that "subject of the Queen" may have the same meaning as "non-alien", within the meaning of section 51(xix) of the Constitution, but this too was not stated definitively.

Corporations are not subjects of the Queen.

=== "Resident in any State" ===
The usage of the word "state" excludes residents of Territories from the protection of section 117.

Residency, on the other hand, is defined broadly, and applies regardless of whether the residency is permanent or temporary.

=== "Disability or discrimination" ===
The practical effect of a law on out-of-state residents is what is to be considered, even if the law nominally applies to all subjects of the Queen, regardless of their state of residence. In determining whether discrimination has occurred, the relative positions of the person claiming discrimination and a hypothetical person who has the same characteristics, except for State of residency, are to be compared.

As an example, a state Bar Association may not, as a condition of admission, require an undertaking to become a resident of said state. Even though the requirement applies equally to residents of each state, it has a much more onerous impact on those out-of-state than those in-State.

==== Exceptions to the rule ====
Not all forms of discrimination on the basis of state are inconsistent with section 117. Welfare schemes, as well as voting rights and regulation of conduct that threatens state security are not seen to be inconsistent with the section.

There is no agreement upon a test which can be applied to determine whether any particular disability or discrimination is covered by the exception. However, in the 2006 case Sweedman v Transport Accident Commission, it was hinted – but not determined – that when a regulation is "appropriate and adapted... to the attainment of a proper objective", it will be permissible.

==== Commonwealth laws ====
It is unclear to what extent, if any, the right conveyed by the section extends to actions and laws of the Commonwealth that give different treatment to residents of different states. In Leeth v Commonwealth, John Toohey and William Deane attempted to find an implied right to equality under Commonwealth law, but Anthony Mason, Daryl Dawson and Michael McHugh found that "no general requirement contained in the Constitution that Commonwealth laws should have a uniform operation throughout the Commonwealth".

The issue remains undetermined, but ANU Senior Lecturer Amelia Simpson has expressed the opinion that "the chances of survival, or revival, of the rights-inspired reading of s 117 appear slim", while Jeremy Kirk has acknowledged the opposition of many of the Justices to the adoption of such a view.

== See also ==
- Re Loubie.
