= Jessica Reid =

Jessica Reid may refer to:

- Jessica Reid, character in Always Goodbye
- Jessica Reid, character in The Lottery (2010 film)
- Jessica Reid (dancer), partner of Joshua Adams

== See also ==
- Jessie Reid, baseball player
- Jessica Reed, see List of Law & Order characters
