= Traps (1985 film) =

Traps is a 1985 Australian film directed by John Hughes.

It screened at the Melbourne International Film Festival.

== Reception ==
The reviewer Marcus Breen said that through depicting the drama in Australian politics, Traps provides "a heavy, often confused, but engrossing attempt to give colour and meaning to the cut and thrust of everyday 'small' personal politics and 'big' federal government politics". He said that the director attempts "techniques here that offered genuine and often exciting potential". Filmnews reviewer Tim Rouse praised the film, writing, "The texture of Traps reminded me of Tim Burns' Against The Grain in its density of image and sound, its delight in the menace of dark urban spaces and technology." He continued, "This visual and aural complexity is often witty, and is made accessible by the continuing thread of Judith's research and her occasional conversations over a table with Gwenda and George."

In a positive review, the Tribune's Mark Roberts stated that the director, John Hughes, draws on the techniques of thrillers, documentaries, narrative films in incorporating segments from three significant Australian films: Newsfront, Exits and Allies. He said that, "Though some may find the result slightly jarring, there is a richness and complexity in Traps which is all too rare in Australian filmmaking." Annette Blonski of Cinema Papers reviewed the film.

Giving the film three stars, The Sydney Morning Herald film critic Susie Eisenhuth wrote, "The problem with Traps is that it's trying to say too much, it's too densely packed, too scrambled by half." She said, however, that "even if you can't take it all in in one go, and even if it's more than a bit undisciplined and untidy, it still comes across loud and clear that at its best Traps is fresh and thought-provoking documentary filmmaking."
