= 1986 in Australian television =

== Events ==
=== Television ===
- 5 January - SBS ceases VHF transmissions on Channel 0 in Sydney and Melbourne.
- 20 January - Neighbours makes its debut on Network Ten and comes to dominate the 7:00pm weeknight timeslot.
- 25 January - American sitcom starring Soleil Moon Frye and George Gaynes Punky Brewster receives its Australian television debut on Seven Network.
- 28 January - Australian news and current affairs program The 7.30 Report debuts on ABC.
- 30 January - Debut of Australian soap opera Prime Time on Nine Network. It was the very last soap opera from Australia ever produced with exterior location scenes shot on film and interior scenes shot on videotape.
- 10 February - Australian soap opera Return to Eden premieres on Network Ten.
- 13 March - Australia's popular and influential TV sketch comedy The D-Generation which was created and written by a group of students from Melbourne University who had gained local notoriety for their stage work such as Marg Downey, Michael Veitch and Tom Gleisner debuts on ABC.
- 16 March - SBS expands into Perth and Hobart.
- 31 March - ABC airs extra morning programs for children for the first time due to school term breaks from 10:00am to 12:00pm.
- 7 July - Last and final episode of the Australian soap opera Return to Eden airs on Network Ten.
- 23 July - The Royal Wedding of Prince Andrew and Sarah Ferguson is broadcast on all television stations except for SBS.
- 5 August - British police procedural television series The Bill premieres on ABC.
- 19 September - Nine Network celebrates 30 years of television with a two-hour special featuring footage from some of TV's most popular and most remembered programs and personalities.
- 27 October - Neighbours airs on the BBC in the UK for the first time.
- 30 October - The Movie Show begins on SBS.
- November - Pbl Mini series Cyclone Tracy + The Great Bookie Robbery air on Channel Nine
- 11 December - Final episode of the Australian soap opera Prisoner airs on Network Ten.
- 15 December - ABC airs extra morning programs for children during the Summer Holidays from 10:00am to 12:00pm until February where School Term 1 will begin.
- December - The Herald and Weekly Times Ltd, owners of HSV-7 & ADS-7 are sold to Rupert Murdoch's News Limited for $1.8 billion. As News Limited owned ATV-10 at this time, HSV-7 is sold to Fairfax (already owners of ATN-7 & BTQ-7) in February 1987 for $320 million.
- Australian children's series Mr. Squiggle returns with a brand new series with Roxanne Kimmorley taking over as presenter.
- AUSSAT satellites are launched, bringing television to remote areas for the first time.
- The 1986 Commonwealth Games are telecast live on ABC from Edinburgh, Scotland.

=== Debuts ===
- 20 January - Off the Dish (Network Ten)
- 28 January - The 7.30 Report (ABC-TV)
- 30 January - Prime Time (Nine Network)
- 10 February - C'mon Kids (Nine Network)
- 10 February - Return to Eden (Network Ten)
- 9 March - A Fortunate Life (Nine Network)
- 13 March - The D-Generation (ABC-TV)
- 20 March - The Girl from Steel City (SBS)
- 31 March - Edge of the Wedge (ABC-TV)
- 3 April - Game of Life (ABC-TV)
- 6 May - The Video Comedy Show (ABC-TV)
- 9 May - Saturdee (Channel Seven)
- 15 May - Fame and Misfortune (ABC-TV)
- 26 May - The Flying Doctors (Nine Network)
- 15 June - Don Spencer's Feathers, Furs or Fins (ABC-TV)
- 19 July - The Cartoon Company (Nine Network)
- 29 July - The Noise (SBS)
- 22 September - My Brother Tom (Network Ten)
- 28 September/30 September - Whose Baby? (28 September: Channel Seven - Melbourne, 30 September: Channel Seven - Sydney)
- 30 September - Studio 86 (ABC-TV)
- 30 September - Filmstruck (ABC-TV)
- 2 October - The Haunted School (ABC-TV)
- 14 October - The Challenge (Nine Network)
- 20 October - Sword of Honour (Channel Seven)
- 30 October - The Movie Show (SBS)
- 10 November - Professor Poopsnagle's Steam Zeppelin (Nine Network)

=== New international programming ===
- 2 January - (United States) Malibu (Nine Network)
- 4 January - (Italy) La Linea (ABC TV)
- 4 January - (Mexico) / (United States) Amigo and Friends (SBS)
- 5 January - (United States) / (Japan) The Mighty Orbots (Channel Seven)
- 5 January - (United States) / (Belgium) Snorks (Channel Seven - Sydney)
- 6 January - (United States) Eye to Eye (Nine Network)
- 7 January - (United States) / (United Kingdom) Kennedy (Nine Network)
- 8 January - (Greece) The Return (SBS)
- 11 January - (United States) / (Japan) The Transformers (Network Ten)
- 23 January - (United Kingdom) The Jockey School (ABC TV)
- 25 January - (United States) Punky Brewster (Channel Seven)
- 30 January - (United Kingdom) The Happy Apple (ABC TV)
- 31 January - (United Kingdom) Submarine (ABC TV)
- 31 January - (United States) Highway to Heaven (Network Ten)
- 3 February - (France) / (Belgium) / (United States) Lucky Luke (ABC TV)
- 10 February - (United States) Kane and Abel (Network Ten)
- 11 February - (United States) Tales from the Darkside (Network Ten)
- 12 February - (United States) Growing Pains (Nine Network)
- 12 February - (United States) Who's the Boss? (Nine Network)
- 24 February - (United Kingdom) Inside China (SBS)
- 27 February - (United States) The Twilight Zone (1985) (Nine Network)
- 4 March - (United States) A Death in California (Seven Network)
- 5 March - (United Kingdom) Cold Warrior (ABC TV)
- 20 March - (Germany) Office Gossip (SBS)
- 31 March - (United States) The Bunjee Venture (ABC TV)
- 2 April - (United States) The Return of Bunjee (ABC TV)
- 2 April - (Germany) Stories from Next Door (SBS)
- 2 April - (United Kingdom) Spooky (ABC TV)
- 3 April - (United Kingdom) Paddington Goes to School (ABC TV)
- 3 April - (New Zealand) Cuckoo Land (ABC TV)
- 4 April - (United Kingdom) Nobody's Hero (ABC TV)
- 4 April - (United States) It's Punky Brewster (Channel Seven)
- 6 April - (United States) Turbo Teen (Network Ten)
- 12 April - (Canada) / (United States) Star Wars: Ewoks (Network Ten)
- 12 April - (Canada) / (United States) Star Wars: Droids (Network Ten)
- 12 April - (Japan) Robotech (Network Ten)
- 15 April - (United States) Moonlighting (Nine Network)
- 27 April - (United States) The New Scooby-Doo Mysteries (Channel Seven)
- 28 April - (United States) The Challenge of the Machine Men (Channel Seven)
- 30 April - (Canada) Bits and Bytes (ABC TV)
- 3 May - (Wales) SuperTed (ABC TV)
- 3 May - (United Kingdom) Do It (ABC TV)
- 5 May - (United States) The Colbys (Nine Network)
- 8 May - (Malta) Sunday Blues (SBS)
- 12 May - (Italy) Longing to Fly (SBS)
- 23 May - (United Kingdom) Smiley's People (ABC TV)
- 23 May - (United Kingdom) Letty (ABC TV)
- 31 May - (United States) Berrenger's (Channel Seven)
- 5 June - (Wales) Wil Cwac Cwac (ABC TV)
- 5 June - (Germany) The Bear, the Tiger and the Others (ABC TV)
- 10 June - (United Kingdom) Edge of Darkness (ABC TV)
- 14 June - (United Kingdom) Treffpunkt: Deutschland (ABC TV)
- 24 June - (United Kingdom) 'Allo 'Allo! (Channel Seven)
- 30 June - (United Kingdom) Fast Forward (ABC TV)
- 10 July - (Greece) Vayia's Treasure (SBS)
- 15 July - (United Kingdom) Floyd on Fish (SBS)
- 17 July - (United Kingdom) The Secret Diary of Adrian Mole, Aged 13¾ (ABC TV)
- 20 July - (United States) Disney's Adventures of the Gummi Bears (Channel Seven)
- 24 July - (United States) The Voyage of the Mimi (ABC TV)
- 27 July - (United States) The Wuzzles (Channel Seven)
- 2 August - (United Kingdom) T-Bag (ABC TV)
- 3 August - (United Kingdom) The Beiderbecke Affair (ABC TV)
- 5 August - (United Kingdom) The Bill (ABC TV)
- 7 August - (Italy) Quaq Quao (ABC TV)
- 10 August - (United Kingdom) Me and My Girl (Channel Seven)
- 11 August - (United Kingdom) Yes Prime Minister (ABC TV)
- 12 August - (New Zealand) Terry and the Gunrunners (ABC TV)
- 13 August - (Italy) The Morca Mystery (SBS)
- 13 August - (Greece) Fiery Skies (SBS)
- 13 August - (United States) Doubletake (Network Ten)
- 13 August - (United Kingdom) The Haunting of Cassie Palmer (ABC TV)
- 16 August - (Republic of Ireland) / (United Kingdom) The Irish R.M. (ABC TV)
- 17 August - (Canada) / (Australia) Spearfield's Daughter (Channel Seven)
- 21 August - (United Kingdom) Victoria Wood as Seen on TV (ABC TV)
- 23 August - (France) / (United States) / (Canada) M.A.S.K. (Nine Network)
- 24 August - (United States) The Centurions (Network Ten)
- 26 August - (United States) Street Hawk (Network Ten)
- 6 September - (United States) / (Japan) ThunderCats (Channel Seven)
- 11 September - (United Kingdom) Anna of the Five Towns (ABC TV)
- 11 September - (United Kingdom) The Comic Strip Presents... (ABC TV)
- 14 September - (United Kingdom) Mansfield Park (ABC TV)
- 17 September - (United States) Finnegan Begin Again (Channel Seven)
- 18 September - (United States) Spenser: For Hire (Nine Network)
- 19 September - (United Kingdom) Stookie (ABC TV)
- 22 September - (United States) Going Bananas (ABC TV)
- 23 September - (France) The Croc-Note Show (ABC TV)
- 25 September - (United States) I Had Three Wives (Nine Network)
- 29 September - (United States) Small Wonder (Nine Network)
- 30 September - (United Kingdom) Chessgame (Nine Network)
- 6 October - (United Kingdom) All at No 20 (ABC TV)
- 15 October - (United States) The Last Precinct (Network Ten)
- 26 October - (United States) Galtar and the Golden Lance (Channel Seven)
- 27 October - (United States) On Wings of Eagles (Network Ten)
- 4 November - (United States) Lady Blue (Channel Seven)
- 7 November - (United States) Airwolf (Channel Seven)
- 10 November - (United States) 227 (Network Ten)
- 10 November - (United States) Call to Glory (Network Ten)
- 10 November - (Japan) The Magical World of Gigi (Network Ten)
- 11 November - (United States) The Best Times (Channel Seven)
- 11 November - (United States) Foley Square (Nine Network)
- 11 November - (United States) Mary (Nine Network)
- 11 November - (United States) Lime Street (Channel Seven)
- 12 November - (United States) Our Family Honor (Channel Seven)
- 12 November - (United States) Detective in the House (Channel Seven)
- 13 November - (United States) Call to Glory (Network Ten)
- 14 November - (United States) Riptide (Network Ten)
- 17 November - (United Kingdom) Relative Strangers (ABC TV)
- 23 November - (United States) Jem (Network Ten)
- 25 November - (United States) MacGruder and Loud (Nine Network)
- 27 November - (United States) Hawaiian Heat (Nine Network)
- 12 December - (United Kingdom) Aspel and Co. (ABC TV)
- 15 December - (United Kingdom) Roland Rat (ABC TV)
- 15 December - (New Zealand) Country GP (ABC TV)
- 15 December - (United Kingdom) Let's Read with Basil Brush (ABC TV)
- 18 December - (United States) You Again? (Network Ten)
- 21 December - (United Kingdom) Freud (ABC TV)
- 21 December - (United States) He-Man & She-Ra: A Christmas Special (Channel Seven)
- 22 December - (United States) / (France) / (Canada) The Care Bears (Network Ten)
- 28 December - (United States) The Flintstones' 25th Anniversary Celebration (Channel Seven)
- 29 December - (United Kingdom) The Hot Shoe Show (ABC TV)
- 29 December - (United States) Television Parts (ABC TV)
- 31 December - (United Kingdom) An Audience with Billy Connolly (ABC TV)

== Changes to network affiliation ==
This is a list of programs which made their premiere on an Australian television network that had previously premiered on another Australian television network. The networks involved in the switch of allegiances are predominantly both free-to-air networks or subscription television networks. Programs that have their free-to-air/subscription television premiere, after previously premiering on the opposite platform (free-to air to subscription/subscription to free-to air) are not included. In some cases, programs may still air on the original television network. This occurs predominantly with programs shared between subscription television networks.

=== Domestic ===
Program	New network(s)	Previous network(s)	Date
Neighbours	Network Ten	Seven Network	20 January
The Maestro's Company	ABC TV	SBS	20 January

== Television shows ==
=== 1950s ===
- Mr. Squiggle and Friends (1959 – 1999)

=== 1960s ===
- Four Corners (1961 – present)

=== 1970s ===
- Hey Hey It's Saturday (1971 – 1999, 2009 – 2010)
- Young Talent Time (1971 – 1989)
- Countdown (1974 – 1987)
- 60 Minutes (1979 – present)
- Prisoner (1979 – 1986)

=== 1980s ===
- Sale of the Century (1980 – 2001)
- Wheel of Fortune (1981 – 2008)
- Sunday (1981 – 2008)
- Today (1982 – present)
- Perfect Match (1984 – 1989)
- Neighbours (1985 – present)
- The Flying Doctors (1986 – 1993)

== Ending this year ==
Date	Show	Channel	Debut
24 January	The National	ABC TV	4 March 1985
7 July	Return to Eden	Network Ten	10 February 1986
11 July	Saturdee	Channel Seven	9 May 1986
29 September (Melbourne)/1 October (Sydney)	Whose Baby?	Channel Seven	28 September 1986 (Melbourne)/30 September 1986 (Sydney)
16 October	The Challenge	Nine Network	14 October 1986
23 October	Sword of Honour	Channel Seven	20 October 1986
11 December	Prisoner	Network Ten	27 February 1979

== See also ==
- 1986 in Australia
- List of Australian films of 1986
