= Theatre Works =

Theatre venue in Melbourne

- Address: 14 Acland Street; St Kilda, Victoria; Australia
- Capacity: 144

Website
- www.theatreworks.org.au

Theatre Works is a theatre venue, presenter and producer of independent theatre in St Kilda, Melbourne.

Theatre Works was founded as Theatreworks, a theatre company, in 1980 by a group of young graduates from the Victorian College of the Arts including Hannie Rayson, Caz Howard, Paul Davies and Peter Summerfield. In the mid-1980s, the theatre company moved to the former Christ Church Parish Hall in Acland Street, St Kilda and the hall was renovated as a 146-seat theatre.

Its name was changed to Theatre Works in 2009. In recent years, Theatre Works has focussed on presenting and supporting independent theatre productions across a range of theatrical genres.

The company is currently headed by Dianne Toulson, Executive Director (2017–present).

Recent leadership has included Artistic Director's Bryce Ives (2018–19), John Sheedy (2016–17), and Daniel Clarke (2012-2015).
