= Paul Davies (Australian writer) =

Australian script writer, novelist and playwright

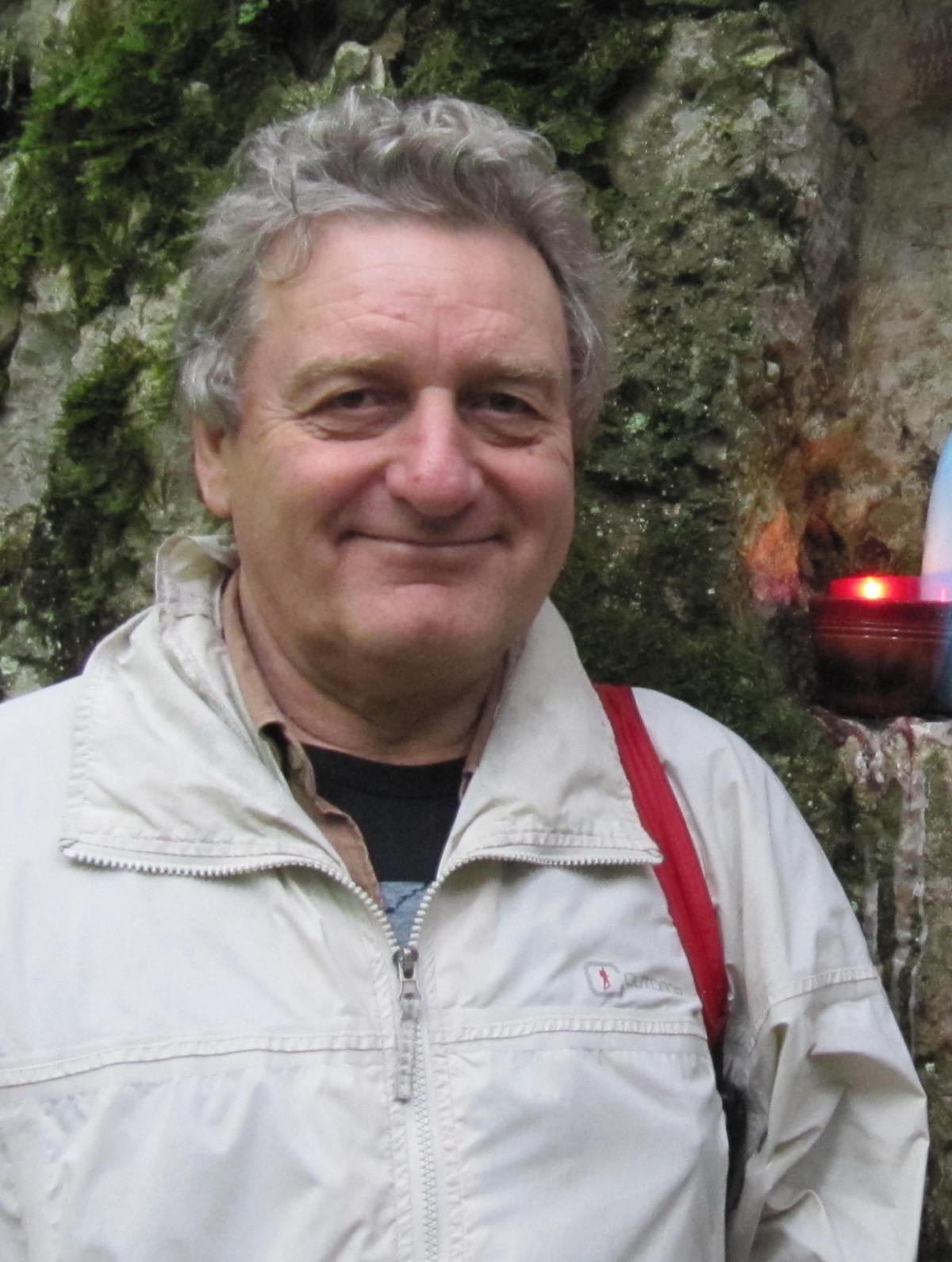
Davies in 2010

Paul Michael Davies is an Australian television script writer, novelist and playwright, who has worked on a number of Crawford television series. He has written several plays for the TheatreWorks theatre company, a leader in staging situation theatre.

== Television work ==
Paul Michael Davies was born in Murwillumbah, New South Wales in 1949. He took his BA with Honours from the University of Queensland and his MA in 1973. He began tutoring at James Cook University before taking a script writing role at Crawford Television Productions in Melbourne, Australia in 1974. He was a script editor and writer on the police television series, Homicide (1974-1975), before moving to work on the Crawford series The Box (1975-1976) and The Sullivans (1976-1978). He also contributed to scripts for Against the Wind (1978), Skyways (1979), Rafferty's Rules (1985), Blue Heelers (1997), Pacific Drive (1996), Stingers (1998-2003), Something in the Air (1999-2001 and Headland (2005).

== Film work ==
Davies moved into film and theatre work, working as a writer, actor and director. He co-wrote and directed the documentary drama film Exits (1980) which was taught on the history syllabus of selected high schools. He co wrote Niel Lynne (1985) with David Baker. He wrote and performed in four John Hughes short or documentary films - November Eleven (1979), Traps (1985), All That Is Solid (1988), and One Way Street (1990). He has also co-written Red Ted and the Great Depression (1994) and Holy Rollers (2000),

== Theatre work ==
Davies became a founding member, writer and performer of the TheatreWorks ensemble in Melbourne. He wrote several “location theatre” plays for TheatreWorks - Storming Mont Albert by Tram (1982) which was performed on trams in Melbourne, Adelaide and around the world for a number of years with great success. He also wrote Breaking Up in Balwyn (1983) which was staged on a riverboat, Living Rooms (1986), which was staged in an historic mansion and Full House/No Vacancies (1989) which was staged in a boarding house. On Shifting Sandshoes was staged in 1988.

He published his first novel, 33 Postcards from Heaven in 2004.

Davies has taught film and scriptwriting at a number of Australian universities and has been published in drama and industry journals and magazines. He completed his PhD at the University of Queensland in 2013 with a thesis entitled Really Moving Drama, a study of TheatreWorks’ ‘location plays’. 49 boxes of his papers, scripts and other materials are held in the University of Queensland Fryer Library.

== Awards ==
- Exits (1980) – nominated for a Greater Union Award at the Sydney Film Festival
- Something in the Air - Return of the Prodigal (episode) – Australian Writers Guild Award (2000)
- Storming Mont Albert by Tram – Australian Writer's Guild Award (1988)
- On Shifting Sands (1988) – Australian Writer's Guild Award
