= James Brooke (DJ) =

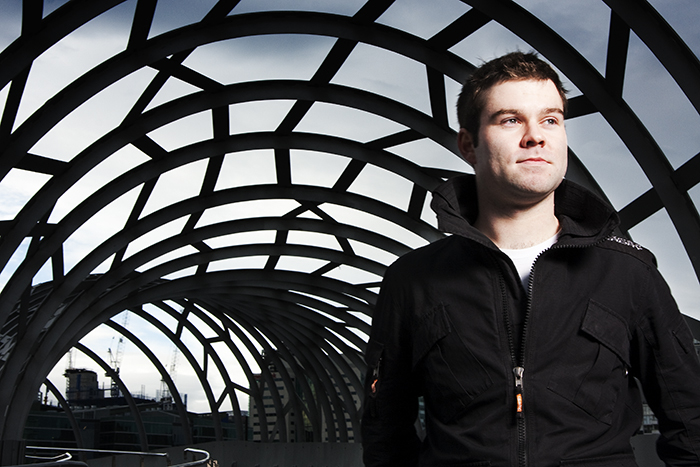
- Promotional photo, taken 2009

Background information
- Birth name: James Brooke
- Born: 4 October 1986 (age 38) Melbourne, Australia
- Genres: Trance; Progressive Trance; Uplifting Trance; Techno; Breakbeat; Drum and bass
- Occupation(s): DJ, artists and repertoire, musician, radio personality
- Instrument(s): Synthesizer, personal computer, bass guitar
- Years active: 2005–present
- Labels: 405 Recordings (2008–present); Central Station Records
- Website: jamesbrooke.net

James Brooke (DJ) (born in Melbourne, Australia on 4 October 1986) is an Australian DJ and radio host. Since 2010 he has hosted Saturday night radio show Elements, on Melbourne's dance music radio station, Kiss FM. James also runs Melbourne trance label 405 Recordings. James has been performing in Melbourne's dance music scene since 2005 and has mixed CDs for brands such as Godskitchen, Sensation Australia, In Trance We Trust and Central Station.

== Background ==
Born in Melbourne, Australia, James' interest in dance music started at the age of 12 with help from his older sister Sara. By the age of 16, he was playing bass guitar in a band but quickly decided to change to DJing. Initially playing breaks, he widened his repertoire to include trance, progressive and techno.

== Music career ==
Not long after turning 18, James began playing at clubs around Melbourne and gained residences at trance nights including White Sands, Nexus and Loose, playing at clubs such as Viper Lounge, Room 680, Brown Alley and Roxanne Parlour. In 2007, he was given the honour of mixing a disc for international trance brand Godskitchen for their Summer Rush! compilation, which was the start of a list of compilation mixes for big name brands. 2009 brought James to the festival stage, where he played at Trance Energy, on the same line-up as BT, Richard Durand, Agnelli & Nelson, Sander van Doorn, Mark Sherry and others.

== 405 Recordings ==
In 2008 James launched his own trance label, 405 Recordings, and quickly signed deals with international labels, Armada Music, Fektive and Black Hole Recordings, to distribute some of the biggest trance artists in Australian territories. 405 Recordings quickly grew to become Australia's biggest trance record label with hundreds on physical titles and thousands of digital titles. More than one 405 Recordings artist has been picked up by international labels, including Aaron Camz, who was picked up by Coldharbour/Armada Music in the Netherlands. James has been the mastermind behind the creation of 405 Recordings's compilation series Trance Elements.

== Radio career ==
During 2008, James cut his teeth in radio on Melbourne's Gay & Lesbian radio station Joy 96.4 as a guest on Saturday night dance music show Vinylizum, to a great response. Over the next couple of years he hosted guest slots on Joy and also Melbourne's dance music radio station, Kiss FM. In 2010 he launched his own Saturday night radio show, Elements on Kiss FM, which has featured guest mixes from Ferry Corsten, Gabriel & Dresden, Above & Beyond and more.

== Discography ==
=== 2007 ===
- Godskitchen – Summer Rush!

=== 2008 ===
- Godskitchen – 10th Anniversary – Discs 2 & 3
- In Trance We Trust AU001 – Disc 2

=== 2009 ===
- Sensation – The Official Compilation 2009
- Godskitchen – Boombox – Disc 2
- 405 Recordings pres. Trance Classics Vol. 1
- Sensation – The Ocean of White Australia 2010

=== 2011 ===
- 100 Biggest Trance Anthems Ever – Disc 1
- Godskitchen – A Trance Odyssey
- Trance Elements

=== 2012 ===
- Trance Elements 2012 Earth
- Trance Elements 2012 Water
- Trance Elements 2012 Air
- Trance Elements 2012 Fire
- Trancendence 2012 Vol.1
- Trancendence 2012 Vol.2
- Trancendence 2012 Vol.3
