= Joseph Brennan (author) =

Australian author

Joseph Brennan (born 23 January 1986) is an Australian author, best known for his academic writing on male sexuality in the media studies fields of fan and porn studies, his work on queerbaiting, slash fiction and manips, and gay pornography in particular. He serves on the editorial board of Psychology and Sexuality.

== Career ==
Brennan earned a bachelor's degree in Media from Macquarie University in 2008. He then moved to the University of Sydney, where he earned a honours degree with university medal in Media and Communications in 2009, followed by a PhD in 2014.

In 2013 he chaired a panel on fan fiction at the Sydney Writers’ Festival devoted to the origins of E. L. James’ Fifty Shades series, which formed the basis of research published in Media International Australia. He is a frequent commentator on issues of fandom, LGBT culture and pornography, having been interviewed by Australian media outlets like ABC Radio National and SBS World News.

Brennan is the author of numerous academic journal articles and book chapters, as well as magazine articles on gay male culture, published in venues such as DNA. He was guest editor of the Journal of Fandom Studies in 2018 and edited the book Queerbaiting and Fandom: Teasing Fans through Homoerotic Possibilities in 2019.

In 2020, Brennan participated in episode six of the ABC Television series Reputation Rehab, in which a journal article he had authored on the viral image scandal of Australian rugby league player Todd Carney was a focus.
