= Jesse Cox (broadcaster) =

Australian broadcaster and filmmaker

- Born: 1986
- Died: December 2017 (aged 30–31); Australia
- Occupations: Radio producer, broadcaster, documentary maker
- Known for: Australian Radio documentaries
- Notable work: Trace podcast, Keep Them Guessing, The Real Tom Banks

Jesse Cox (1986 – December 2017) was an Australian radio producer, broadcaster, and documentary maker.

== Career ==
Throughout his broadcasting career, Jesse Cox worked for Sydney's FBi Radio, ABC Radio National, and was head of original content at Audible's APAC office. In 2012, Cox also formed his own company, Creative Nonfiction to explore digital storytelling. Cox's 2012 radio documentary for Radio National's 360documentaries, Keep Them Guessing, won the Directors' Choice Award in the 2013 Third Coast / Richard H. Driehaus Foundation Competition. Cox's radio documentary The Real Tom Banks won the Best Documentary - Silver Award at the 2014 Third Coast International Audio Festival. This international award for creative audio works was judged by This American Life presenter, Ira Glass. Other radio programs and podcasts Cox worked on include Radiotonic, This is About, All the Best and Long Story Short.

Cox also created the documentary theatre show Wael Zuaiter Unknown, which he performed live as part of the 2014 Next Wave Festival. The Sydney Morning Herald called Cox "a storyteller of great sensitivity and intelligence" in their review of this show.

Cox created geo-locative smartphone audio works such as Ghosts of Biloela, which was shortlisted for the 2017 NSW Premier's History Awards in the Multimedia History Prize category and described by the State Library of NSW judges as "an innovative, contemporary avenue to history...accessible to a broad audience".

Cox won the 2017 'Innovation' Walkley Award for his role as executive producer of the ABC Radio National true-crime Trace podcast, alongside Rachael Brown and Jeremy Story Carter. In 2017, Director of ABC Radio, Michael Mason, described Trace as "ABC's most successful podcast".

His work has been included in Next Wave Festival, Art & About, Underbelly Arts and Sculpture by the Sea.

== Death ==
Jesse Cox died suddenly in December 2017 from a rare soft tissue cancer in his brain.

== Awards ==
Year	Nominee / work	Award	Result
2013	Keep Them Guessing radio documentary	Third Coast / Richard H. Driehaus Foundation Competition : Directors' Choice Award	Won
2014	The Real Tom Banks radio documentary	Third Coast International Audio Festival : Best Documentary - Silver Award	Won
2017	Ghosts of Biloela	NSW Premier's History Awards : Multimedia History Prize	Shortlisted
2017	Trace podcast	Walkley Award : Innovation Award	Won
