= Say a Prayer (One Departed) =

Single by Devils in Heaven
- B-side: "The Night is Over"
- Released: April 1992
- Recorded: 1992
- Studio: Festival and ATA Studios
- Genre: AOR
- Length: 3:44
- Label: Columbia
- Songwriter(s): David Whitney
- Producer(s): Garry Frost

Devils in Heaven singles chronology
"Say a Prayer (One Departed)" (1992)	"Liberation" (1993)

Music video
- "Say a Prayer" on YouTube

"Say a Prayer (One Departed)" is the debut single from Tasmanian band, Devils in Heaven. The single was released in April 1992 and reached the low 80s in the ARIA Charts but disappeared after a few weeks.

== Background ==
Say a Prayer was originally written in Launceston, Tasmania by lead singer Dave Whitney in 1988. When Devils in Heaven first learnt the song, they all agreed that the quality of song exceeded their earlier originals. This gave them a boost and enthusiasm towards the band's future and it was not long after when they left Tasmania to tour mainland Australia. Before they left, Say a Prayer was included on a locally made vinyl compilation LP called "1 Out of the Bag".

Later in 1989, the song changed the possible trajectory of the band's career. While they were playing in Rockhampton, Queensland, a band manager from Sydney, Harry Slee, heard them play this song. He saw the potential of the band and helped them establish themselves on the Sydney music scene. At the end of the next year, they made their first professional recording of the song as a demo at Powerhouse Recording Studios in Alexandria.

When the band performed on Channel 10's Star Search the next year in 1991, it was the song Say a Prayer they chose to use as their entry in the Grand Final. Their performance was a success and as a result they were awarded a recording contract by Denis Handlin from Columbia Records, Sony Entertainment. After winning the Grand Final with this song it became their debut single released the next year in 1992.

The band recorded Say a Prayer at Festival Studios in Pyrmont and ATA Studios in Glebe during February of 1992. Garry Frost, ex-member of 1927 and Moving Pictures produced the single and it was mixed at INXS' recording studios in Darlinghurst, Rhinoceros Studios. The performance part of the music video was shot in a warehouse in Surry Hills and most of the outdoor scenes were filmed around Millers Point.

The single was released in April of 1992 but failed to make an impact on the charts. The momentum the band had built up from appearing on Star Search was slowly subsiding and the band split up the following year.

In the years following the band's break up, their singles have been highly sought after by collectors. There weren't many copies printed and interest in the band has increased since music lovers discovered the band over the internet. Their CD's have been known to be sold for almost $200 and have been listed for sale for as much as $500.

== Track listing ==
1. "Say a Prayer (One Departed)" (David Whitney) – 3:44
2. "The Night is Over" (David Whitney, Nelson Tabe) – 4:07

== Charts ==
Chart (1992)	Peak position
Australia (ARIA Charts)	94
