= Devils in Heaven =

Australian rock band

- Origin: Launceston, Tasmania, Australia
- Genres: adult orientated rock; heavy harmony rock; hard rock; pop rock
- Years active: 1986–1993
- Labels: Columbia/Sony Music; Possum Music; AOR Heaven
- Members: David Whitney; Matthew Shield; Nelson Tabe; Philip Crothers
- Past members: David Cheung; Richard Rossi
- Website: www.facebook.com/tassiesdevilsinheaven

Devils in Heaven are an Australian rock band. Formed in Launceston, Tasmania, in 1986 as Dinner Time, the band changed their name when they first left Tasmania to tour in 1989. They moved to Sydney in 1991 and they won the national talent TV show Star Search, winning a record contract. That contract saw the release of their debut single "Say a Prayer (One Departed)" which appeared on the ARIA singles chart. They followed it up with a single "Liberation", in 1993 and broke up soon after.

== Career ==
Devils in Heaven started out as a school covers band in Launceston, Tasmania during the mid-1980’s. After a couple of years of gigging around Tasmania, the boys left their comfy confines in March 1989 and joined the thriving Northern Queensland circuit of touring bands. It was a baptism by fire, but the boys learned to adapt to different type of audiences and built up their stamina and resilience through the constant playing.

It was on this circuit that they were discovered by a band manager, who introduced them to the flourishing Sydney music scene. Here in Sydney is where the industry heavyweights became aware of the band, who by now were playing their own original music for about half of their shows. The band began recording demo recordings, but their demos didn’t seem to land on the right music executives’ desks.

In 1991, the band accepted an offer to appear on the nationally televised talent show, Star Search. The band went on to appear a total of eight times, eventually winning the band section of the Grand Final. But the band didn’t strike while the iron was hot. Instead, their debut single, Say a Prayer (One Departed), was released six months later. By then, the hype surrounding their Star Search win had somewhat subsided. At this time in April 1992, the music landscape was starting to change with the likes of Nirvana and the grunge scene taking over the airwaves.

After the lack of support for their debut single, the Devils decided on having a last-ditch effort into cracking the big time by recording "Liberation" in USA. The band had become cynical and tired by this time and decided their fate would rely on the success or lack of success of their E.P. Liberation. Unfortunately, Liberation didn’t even make an indentation on the charts, and the boys decided to part ways in October 1993. Now that almost thirty years have passed, their music helps keep the band living on.

== Members ==
- David Whitney – vocals, guitar
- Matt Shield – bass guitar
- Nelson Tabe – keyboards
- Phil Crothers – drums

=== Previous members ===
- David Cheung – keyboards (in Dinner Time)
- Richard Rossi – piano (in Dinner Time)

== Discography ==
=== Albums ===
List of albums, with selected details
Title	Details
Rise	Released: June 2021; Label: AOR Heaven (AORH00234); Format: Digital, CD

=== Singles ===
List of singles, with selected chart positions
Title	Year	Peak chart positions	Album
Title	Year	AUS	Album
"Say a Prayer (One Departed)"	1992	94	Rise
"Liberation"	1993	—	Rise
