= Robert Carlton =

English murderer (1695–1742)

- Born: 1695
- Died: 5 April 1742; Diss common, Norfolk, England
- Occupation: Tailor
- Status: Executed by hanging and gibbeted
- Criminal charges: Murder and sodomy

Details
- Victims: Mary Frost

Robert Carlton (1695 – 5 April 1742) was an English tailor from Diss, Norfolk who committed murder by poisoning Mary Frost, whom his former male lover John Lincoln intended to marry, using sublimate of mercury disguised as salt on 15 November 1741. Frost died the next day. Carlton was convicted for the murder of Mary Frost as well as for sodomy with Lincoln, and sentenced to death on 18 March. The events prior to his execution including a Sunday church service and a final staged meeting at the local alehouse with Lincoln, and the execution itself, were spectated by a total of over 10,000 people. Carlton was hanged and his body was then gibbeted (displayed in a cage post-execution) on Diss common.

== Background ==
Carlton was born in 1695. He was "of honest and upright parents", who paid for his education and bound him apprentice to a local tailor; he spent several years in this role, appearing to have carried out the apprenticeship faithfully. It was stated in reports that after this ended, he was "led astray by a company of sodomites, which unnatural practice he followed ever after". For twenty years or more in Diss, it was written that "he was notoriously guilty" of sodomy, though locals did not make any complaints against him during this time. The lack of public pushback to his way of life over this period allowed him to continue his life in business and in private without any issues or persecution.

When Carlton was in his forties, he fell in love with John Lincoln, a young man who became his "lodger and bed-fellow". Eventually, Lincoln began instead courting Mary Frost, a girl from the countryside in Redgrave, Suffolk. When Lincoln brought Frost back to his and Carlton's lodgings, Carlton threatened Lincoln, saying that "if he ever brought his whores near to him he would do them some mischief". However, Lincoln continued to meet with Frost and a few weeks later they announced that they intended to marry. After attempting to convince Lincoln not to go ahead with the marriage, it was reported that Carlton threatened to poison Frost.

== Murder and trial ==
On the evening of 15 November 1741, Carlton invited Frost as well as Samuel Fuller, her landlord, to have a cold loin of mutton for supper. The salt on the table was used up after Fuller had been served, so Carlton left the room to get Frost some more, and upon his return "entreated her to eat heartily". The same night, she became violently sick, and "swelled very much". She was attended to by friends who "blister'd her and purg'd her, but to no purpose." She died in agony at Fuller's house on 16 November. It was reported that "when the doctors open'd her they found all her entrails quite affected by the poison", and as such Lincoln and Fuller impeached Carlton for the murder. He was arrested and taken to Thetford for trial.

At the Thetford assizes, Carlton was convicted of murder by poisoning of his lodger's fiancée, though also of sodomy with Lincoln. The trial was well-attended. Lincoln admitted to his relationships with both Carlton and Frost, speaking about Carlton's threats to poison her, and was in return not prosecuted. An apprentice apothecary from Diss, Thomas Bacon, testified that he had sold sublimate of mercury to Carlton, and that he had said it would kill rats and mice. Fuller recounted the supper, suggesting that the salt given to Mary had been mixed with this poison. Carlton admitted to sodomy, but denied poisoning anyone and accused Fuller of the murder. On 18 March 1742, Carlton was found guilty. He was one of six men sentenced to death at the Thetford assizes at this time, though the only one to be sentenced for murder (the other sentences being for horse stealing or house breaking) and the only one to actually be executed as the others' sentences were later commuted to transportation.

== Execution ==
Market towns like Diss did not see executions frequently, and in 1742 none had taken place within living memory; the location of the execution had to be decided and a new gallows and gibbet were constructed. Due to the potential for a large crowd and the recently prevalent perception of execution spectators as rowdy and sometimes violent, it was decided that Carlton would be executed on the open common land between Diss and Scole, a village close by.

=== Pre-execution events ===
The murder and execution were sensational. Over 10,000 people assembled from miles around the area to spectate the events prior to and including the execution. His homosexuality likely added to the attraction for the crowds to his execution. On 4 April 1742, 2,000 to 4,000 people gathered in the parish church to attend its Sunday service; Carlton was sat in the pew in which he was usually situated, though was placed under close guard. The sermon was preached by Reverend Edward Chappelow. After this, because Carlton could not bring himself to condemn Lincoln, Carlton was taken to the local alehouse to meet with him for the final time. In view of the public, they each "drank a pint of ale and ate a biscuit together, and parted good friends". Another account of this states that during this event Carlton gave his shears, scissors, a thimble and two sixpences to Lincoln, telling him that "though he died for him, he loved him to the last".

=== Execution, display and gibbeting ===
On 5 April 1742, at about 4pm on Diss common, an open cart carried Carlton to the scaffold, and he went up in front of the crowd. Following prayers conducted by the local rector, he was offered the chance to confess, but continued to state that he was not guilty for Frost's death. It was reported that he appeared penitent as he was hooded, and he was then hanged.

Following his execution Carlton's body was cut down from the gallows, quickly carried back to the house which was the murder scene. The body was then "hung up upon a balk in the middle of the room, and shown at two pence a piece". After this, in accordance with Carlton's sentence, his body was hung in chains from a gibbet on Diss common, close to the gallows. This gibbet could be seen for miles around, and was left to rot.

Aside from in a note attached to the entry for Mary Frost, Carlton's name is not listed in the burials in the Diss parish register. Lincoln later married a widow in October 1742, though himself died up to three months later.

=== Reactions ===
The murder was widely reported throughout the nearby region. Following the execution, an account of the execution was created. It is small, is not illustrated, is anonymous, and was printed poorly. It seems to have been printed for sale to the crowd on the day of the execution. The nearest presses were 20 miles from Diss, in Norwich, though its poor quality suggests it was an early output from presses in Bury St Edmunds rather than Norwich or Ipswich. It described a selection of some of the events that the townspeople organised, and included accounts of the crime and execution though had several inaccuracies. Local antiquary and rector of the nearby village of Fersfield, Reverend Francis Blomefield, attended the execution, and kept one of the accounts of the execution that were being sold. Blomefield's own account of events would never be printed as he had already recently published his history of Diss at that point, six years prior. It included Blomefield's comments on the local morals and his opinions of those involved. Following the gibbeting, Blomefield commented that Carlton "hangs there as a just example to all such villains, & especially to those of this place, who were concerned with him in his detestable practices".

A play, Meat, by James McDermott, is a 2025 historical drama that covers the events of the murder.

== Sources ==
- Durston, Gregory J (2017). Fields, Fens, and Felonies: Crime and Justice in Eighteenth-Century East Anglia. Waterside Press. ISBN 978-1-909976-11-5.
- Tarlow, Sarah (2017). The Golden and Ghoulish Age of the Gibbet in Britain. London: Palgrave Macmillan UK. doi:10.1057/978-1-137-60089-9. ISBN 978-1-137-60088-2.
