= Exits (film) =

Exits is a 1979 Australian drama-documentary directed by Paul Davies. It centres on the effect of the 1975 dismissal of the Labor Government of Gough Whitlam on a handful of characters wandering around Melbourne.

It is the earliest of several treatments of the event, which include Home on the Range (Gil Scrine, 1982) and The Dismissal (1983).
