= Shane Alexander (volleyball) =

Australian volleyball player (born 1986)

Personal information
- Nationality: Australian
- Born: 7 January 1986 (age 40)
- Height: 202 m (662 ft 9 in)
- Weight: 95 kg (209 lb)
- Spike: 339 cm (133 in)
- Block: 320 cm (126 in)

Volleyball information
- Number: 10

Career
Years	Teams
2010	Queensland Pirates

National team
2010	Australia

Shane Alexander (born 7 January 1986) is an Australian male volleyball player who plays the position of setter. He was part of the Australia men's national volleyball team at the 2010 FIVB Volleyball Men's World Championship in Italy. He played for Queensland Pirates.

== Clubs ==
- Queensland Pirates (2010)
