= Re Loubie =

Judgement of the High Court of Australia

- Court: Supreme Court of Queensland
- Citation: [1986] 1 Qd R 272

Court membership
- Judge sitting: Justice Dowsett

Re Loubie, was a 1986 case involving a breach of section 117 of the Australian constitution by legislation of the state of Queensland. S. 117 provides protection from discrimination on the basis of inter-state residence:

A subject of the Queen, resident in any State, shall not be subject in any other State to any disability or discrimination which would not be equally applicable to him if he were a subject of the Queen resident in such other State.

== Case facts ==
Loubie was a resident of the state of New South Wales. In Sydney he bought five bags of heroin weighing 138.14 grams for $25,000. He was intending to sell the drugs in Brisbane for a personal profit of around $5,000 to $7,500. After the purchase of the heroin he bought three plane tickets, under false names, to travel to Brisbane with two accomplices, one of whom was a woman who carried the drugs. All three were apprehended by police after they left Brisbane airport. Both accomplices admitted their involvement in the intended sale of the drugs; Loubie denied involvement. However, when presented with evidence of his involvement by his accomplices he admitted involvement and offered the police officer $10,000 cash as well as the $11,000 worth of jewelry he was wearing, as a bribe to avoid prosecution. Loubie stated to the officer:

Look what can I do. The drug is mine. I got five kids. Can we do something. I can get money. I ring my nephew in Sydney. He will get $10,000.00 on his house. I give it to you. Maybe I can get some of the drug back, soon as I sell it I give you the money. Please can I go. What about my 5 kids.

He was charged under the Health Act (1937) (Qld) of possession of dangerous drugs, in this case heroin, for the purpose of sale. He was also charged under s. 121 of the Criminal Code (Qld) for corruptly offering a police officer a sum of money and a quantity of jewellery in order to obtain protection from prosecution.

He was denied bail under the Bail Act 1980 (Qld), in which at that time s. 16(3)(b) stated: "it is prohibited granting bail to a person ordinarily residing outside Queensland, unless cause was shown why it should be granted". Loubie was unable to show cause and bail was denied.

However under the Act a resident of Queensland who had been charged with the same offences as Loubie would not have had to show cause for bail and therefore would have been more likely to be granted it. Loubie believed that this provision in s. 16 discriminated against him based on his residence in another state, in conflict with s. 117 of the federal constitution, and he appealed to the Supreme Court of Queensland to dispute the ruling on bail.

Justice Dowsett in the Supreme Court found that s. 16(3)(b) of the Queensland Bail Act conflicted with s. 117 of the federal constitution: “by selecting residence as the criterion for applying the statutory disadvantage, the legislation chooses the exact standard prohibited by s. 117”. S.16(3)(b) was therefore invalid.. Consequently, Loubie did not have to show cause to be granted bail, and it was granted.

== Significance ==
The Loubie case started a ripple effect with many other cases regarding bail to people from out of state. After Loubie there was the Fitzgerald case, and after that many others. In all these cases it was determined that the accused did not have to show cause to be granted bail, whatever their state of residence.

As a result of the Loubie case, the Queensland Bail Act was amended, so that any person apprehended in Queensland who was from out of state no longer needed to show cause to be granted bail.

On a national level, the Loubie case forced all states to check whether their bail laws similarly conflicted with Constitution s. 117. The Victorian Bail Act (1977) was also amended.

The ultimate outcome of the Loubie case was a strengthening of Australians' right not to be discriminated against on the basis of inter-state residence.

== Subsequent events ==
After being granted bail, Loubie fled to Lebanon, until 1999 when he surrendered at the Australian Embassy at Beirut and voluntarily returned to Australia. He pleaded guilty to the charges and was sentenced to seven years imprisonment.
