= Joshua Adams =

Australian Dancesport competitor (born 1986)

- Born: 10 December 1986 (age 38); Sydney, New South Wales, Australia

Joshua K. Adams (born 10 December 1986) is an Australian dancesport competitor.

== Career ==
Adams is a two time National Dancesport Champion dancing with longtime dance partner Jessica Reid.
