= Prisoner season 2 =

Prisoner
- Season 2
- DVD cover
- Starring: Patsy King; Fiona Spence; Peta Toppano; Val Lehman; Elspeth Ballantyne; Colette Mann; Sheila Florance; Barry Quin; Gerard Maguire; Monica Maughan; George Mallaby; Betty Bobbitt
- No. of episodes: 86

Release
- Original network: Network Ten
- Original release: 22 January – 12 November 1980

Season chronology
- ← Previous; Season 1 Next → Season 3

The second season of Australian drama television series Prisoner (commonly known as Prisoner: Cell Block H) premiered on Network Ten on 22 January 1980. It consists of 86 episodes and concluded on 12 November 1980.

This season's storylines include the escape of Roslyn Coulson, aided by terrorist Janet Dominguez and the subsequent shooting of Erica Davidson; Lizzie's exoneration; the bomb explosion which causes the deaths of Jim Fletcher's family; Bea Smith's feud with new prisoner Kay White; Judy Bryant's planned revenge on corrupt officer Jock Stewart for the murder of her girlfriend Sharon Gilmour; the season finale tunnel escape collapse.

== Cast ==
=== Main ===
- Patsy King as Governor Erica Davidson
- Fiona Spence as Vera Bennett
- Peta Toppano as Karen Travers (Note: Karen Travers only appeared in the first episode of the season.)
- Val Lehman as Bea Smith
- Elspeth Ballantyne as Meg Jackson
- Colette Mann as Doreen Anderson
- Sheila Florance as Lizzy Birdsworth
- Barry Quin as Greg Miller (Note: Greg Miller departs in episode 86. He later returns from episodes 107–110 as a guest character.)
- Gerard Maguire as Jim Fletcher
- Monica Maughan as Pat O'Connell (Note: Pat O'Connell is a central recurring character for the first seven episodes of the season. She becomes a main character from episode 87.)
- George Mallaby as Paul Reid (Note: Paul Reid first appeared in episode 85 and was listed as a guest character. He becomes a main character from episode 86.)
- Betty Bobbitt as Judy Bryant (Note: Judy Bryant first appeared in episode 91 as a guest character. She becomes a main character from episode 117.)

=== Central supporting ===
- Amanda Muggleton as Chrissie Latham
- Sigrid Thornton as Roslyn Coulson

=== Recurring ===
- Deidre Rubenstein as Janet Dominguez
- Penelope Stewart as Kathleen Leach
- Penny Ramsay as Leila Fletcher
- Ray Meagher as Geoff Butler
- Judith McGrath as Colleen Powell
- Jeanie Drynan as Angela Jeffries
- Carmel Millhouse as Mary McCauley
- Cornelia Frances as Carmel Saunders
- Henry Cuthbertson as Dr. Herbert
- Lloyd Cunnington as Mr. Goodwin
- Graham Rouse as Mal James
- John Higginson as Tony Reid
- Rosalind Speirs as Caroline Simpson
- Bernadette Gibson as Vivienne Williams
- Terry McDermott as Brian Williams
- Ian Gilmour as Kevin Burns
- Joan Letch as Rhonda West
- Charmayne Lane as Shirley
- Margot Knight as Sharon Gilmour
- Lester Morris as Mr. Muir
- Jane Clifton as Margot Gaffney
- Kate Turner as Sally Blakely
- Rob Forza as Bill Harris
- Peter Ford as Michael Simpson
- Carl Bleazby as Hugh Gilbertson
- Babs Wheelton as Louisa Burns
- Fay Mokotow as Mrs. Seymour
- Tom Oliver as Ken Pearce
- Nanette Wallace as Sally Nichols
- Simon Reichelt as Andrew O'Connell
- Jentah Sobott as Heather "Mouse" Trapp
- Dina Mann as Debbie Pearce
- Reylene Pearce as Phyllis Hunt
- Kevin Summers as Det. Sgt. Parsons
- Paul Young as Capt. Lloyd Barton
- Penny Downie as Kerry Vincent
- Rod Mullinor as David Austin
- Michael Duffield as Charles Baldwin
- Kirk Alexander as Dr. East
- Tommy Dysart as Jock Stewart
- Ian Smith as Ted Douglas
- Stephen O'Rourke as Harry Bone
- Eugene Schlusser as Mr. Westmore
- Sidney Jackson as Det. Sgt. Teagan
- Caroline Gillmer as Helen Smart
- Judith Dick as Marcia/Ellen Huntley
- Michelle Argue as Josie
- Tracey-Jo Riley as Leanne Bourke
- Jude Kuring as Noeline Bourke
- Susanne Haworth as Gail Summers
- Jeremy Higgins as Tim Summers
- John Lee as Andrew Reynolds
- John Larking as Vince Talbot
- Joy Westmore as Joyce Barry
- Jack Harris as Terry Barry
- Rob Steele as Dr. Rupert
- Sandy Gore as Kay White
- Janet Lord as Mrs. Blakely
- Anne Scott-Pendlebury as Pauline Curtis
- Colin Vancao as Weasel
- Maureen Edwards as Hazel Crowe
- Lois Ramsay as Agnes Forster
- Anne-Marie Wiles as Nancy
- Bryon Williams as Dr. Weissman
- Brian Moll as Mr. Spenser
- Elaine Cusick as Linda Jones
- Sue Devine as Tracey Morris
- Darren Sole as Danny Jones
- Terry Gill as Det. Insp. Grace
- Belinda Davey as Hazel Kent
- Anthony Hawkins as Bob Morris
- Rowena Wallace as Anne Griffin
- Wynn Roberts as Stuart Gillespie

== Episodes ==
No. overall	Episode	Directed by	Written by	Original release date
80	Episode 1	Leigh Spence	John Upton	22 January 1980
Ros approaches the new prisoner, Janet, to suggest they try to escape together. Janet arranges for a visit from Ros as a 'Ros' so drugs can be smuggled in. Will Karen survive her operation?
81	Episode 2	Philip East	Ray Kolle	23 January 1980
When no one can wake up her up the following morning, Ros is taken to the infirmary and Greg suspects she's been drugged. Despite a warning from Jim's wife, Meg continues to see Geoff.
82	Episode 3	Philip East	Dave Worthington	29 January 1980
Leila grows more concerned that Geoff is dangerous when she reads in the paper about a man being beaten up in the pub. Ros and Janet put their escape plan into action, but can they escape Wentworth?
83	Episode 4	Julian Pringle	Sheila Sibley	30 January 1980
Ros and Janet's escape plans go awry, leaving one of them caught, one on the run and Erica in hospital. Meanwhile, when Meg tells him she doesn't want to see him anymore, Geoff soon shows his true colours.
84	Episode 5	Julian Pringle	Denise Morgan	5 February 1980
After Jim arrives at Meg's to make sure she's okay, a fight between Jim and Geoff breaks out. Bea helps Pat write to Herbie about the trial, and Ros makes a serious accusation against Jim.
85	Episode 6	Rod Hardy	John Wood	6 February 1980
A new social worker, Paul Reid, begins his first day at Wentworth. Greg see an old friend about taking over his practice, and Pat receives some devastating news.
86	Episode 7	Ron Hardy	Margaret McClusky	12 February 1980
Pat is distraught after David's suicide and lashes out. Lizzie is questioned about her 20-year-old crime, and worries that they're trying to pin new charges on her. Wentworth says goodbye to Greg.
87	Episode 8	Marcus Cole	Marcus Cole	13 February 1980
Bea is suspicious about the police interviewing Lizzie and becomes determined to get to the bottom of the situation. Once she knows the truth, she isn't sure if she should tell Lizzie.
88	Episode 9	Marcus Cole	Ian Bradley & Anne Lucas	19 February 1980
When the newspaper runs an article about Lizzie's innocence, Erica is determined to find out how the story was leaked, and Paul Reid is prime suspect.
89	Episode 10	Leigh Spence	John Upton	20 February 1980
When Doreen fails to pick her up, a distraught Lizzie starts to wonder if the outside is even worth it. A mother and daughter turn up at the halfway house escaping domestic abuse.
90	Episode 11	Leigh Spence	Ray Kolle	26 February 1980
Caroline and Vivienne try to cover up Brian's murder, thinking the police won't believe it was self-defence. Tony Reid gets mixed up with the wrong crowd and meets a drug dealer, Sharon Gilmore.
91	Episode 12	Simon Wincer	George Mallaby	27 February 1980
Sharon Gilmore arrives at Wentworth and immediately gets on Bea's bad side. Caroline and Vivienne are brought on remand to Wentworth and handle the situation very differently.
92	Episode 13	Simon Wincer	Dave Worthington	4 March 1980
Paul is shocked by Sharon's demands, but Tony insists she's lying. Doreen is talked into taking a sickie, and asks Lizzie to phone her work.
93	Episode 14	Marcus Cole	Sheila Sibley	5 March 1980
After being attacked, Chrissie goes into premature labour, and is rushed to hospital. Doreen loses her job, as Lizzie failed to call in sick for her, and Chrissie reveals a secret.
94	Episode 15	Marcus Cole	John Upton	11 March 1980
Bea tries to manipulate Paul to get herself out of isolation. On the outside, Sharon, Tony and others arrested in the raid go to court, and Lizzie struggles with the sobriety rule in the halfway house.
95	Episode 16	Gary Conway	Denise Morgan	12 March 1980
Sharon is bought back to Wentworth and becomes close friends with Chrissie, and the two of them make plans to take over from Bea as joint top dog. Tired of seeing Doreen upset, Lizzie confronts Kevin.
96	Episode 17	Gary Conway	John Wood	18 March 1980
Doreen announces her engagement, but Lizzie's not sure about Kevin. When Chrissie is told she can regularly visit to see baby Elizabeth in the hospital, Sharon sees this as a way of smuggling in contraband.
97	Episode 18	Leigh Spence	George Mallaby	19 March 1980
Chrissie is shocked to learn who her attacker is, and has to do some fast talking. The influx of drugs leads to chaos in Wentworth, and with Bea still in isolation, the new top dogs can't seem to handle it.
98	Episode 19	Leigh Spence & Michael Pattinson	Margaret McClusky	25 March 1980
Bea is out of isolation and sets to work regaining full control of the women. Doreen and Lizzie testify at Caroline and Vivienne's committal hearing. Kevin wants to introduce Doreen to his mother.
99	Episode 20	Rod Hardy	Dave Wothington	26 March 1980
A combination of drugs in Wentworth and power-plays within the women sees an inmate locked in solitary. Doreen and her future mother-in-law aren't getting along and Doreen is tired of hiding her past.
100	Episode 21	Ron Hardy	Ian Bradley	1 April 1980
Mrs Burns threatens Doreen that she'll disown Kevin if they marry, but Lizzie takes matters into her own hands. Paul goes to check in on how Vivienne is doing, but has trouble finding her.
101	Episode 22	Marcus Cole	Denise Morgan	2 April 1980
Doreen and Lizzie are taken in by the police, and Doreen worries about how this will affect her relationship with Kevin. Tony struggles when Sally's ex wants her back, and Bea fights back as top dog.
102	Episode 23	Marcus Cole	Ray Kolle	8 April 1980
Chissie is told that Elizabeth can leave the hospital, but she has to be on her best behaviour if she wants to care for her at Wentworth. The power struggle between Bea and Judy continues.
103	Episode 24	Gary Conway	John Upton	9 April 1980
Judy tells the truth about the fight, and Caroline is released to the half way house. Lizzie goes on a shoplifting mission, and is elated when she returns home to hear that the police have been called.
104	Episode 25	Gary Conway	George Mallaby	15 April 1980
Lizzie is rapt to be back on the inside, but Bea is less impressed. The drama group arrives at Wentworth, led by Ken Pearce. Jim's in trouble when Erica finds out he's been seeing Caroline.
105	Episode 26	Leigh Spence	Margaret McClusky	16 April 1980
The women give Jim grief after learning of his affair with Caroline, but the biggest concern is if his wife finds out. Judy has more health issues, and Lizzie makes another attempt to return to prison.
106	Episode 27	Leigh Spence	Denise Morgan	22 April 1980
When Doreen finds a dog in the prison garden and smuggles it inside, all the women try to keep it from the guards. Geoff Butler is back, and when his trial begins, Meg and Jim must give evidence.
107	Episode 28	Rod Hardy	Sheila Sibley	23 April 1980
Michael offers Geoff $2000 if he can arrange for Caroline to come to him. Greg Miller returns to town for Pat's appeal, and Erica asks him to have a word with Judy.
108	Episode 29	Ron Hardy	Dave Worthington	29 April 1980
As the prisoners learn Shakespeare for the drama program, Bea falls further for Ken. When Judy refuses medical treatment, Lizzie takes matters into her own hands. Leila's harassment gets serious.
109	Episode 30	Marcus Cole	Marcus Cooney	30 April 1980
Bea is furious, thinking Ken has made a fool of her, and cancels drama class. When Michael delivers Geoff's parcel to Jim's hotel, the consequences are disastrous.
110	Episode 31	Marcus Cole	Ian Bradley & David Worthington	6 May 1980
Jim is devastated dealing with the aftermath of the explosion. Gred testifies at Pat's appeal, and Bea tries to help Ken straighten out his daughter.
111	Episode 32	Gary Conway	Denise Morgan	7 May 1980
Ken arranges for his daughter, Debbie, to spend 24 hours in Wentworth to straighten her out, and most of the prisoners, especially Bea, look forfowrd to helping.
112	Episode 33	Gary Conway	John Wood	13 May 1980
A new prisoner, artist Kerry Vincent, arrives but Doreen is concerned for Bea when Ken takes a special interest in her. Lizzie embarks on a path of morality, and the police close in on Geoff.
113	Episode 34	Leigh Spence	Ray Kolle	14 May 1980
New prisoner Kerry Vincent settles into Wentworth, but no one is sure what to make of her. Jim returns to work but Erica thinks it's too soon, and despite being terrified, Judy goes in for her operation.
114	Episode 35	Leigh Spence	Bryon Williams & Chris Milne	20 May 1980
The rumours about Kerry persist, and worse when the women are caught making home brew. Caroline and Vivienne's trial end. Kerry has her art exhibition, and Wentworth gets a new officer - Jock Stewart.
115	Episode 36	Michael Pattinson	John Upton	21 May 1980
Vera is furious that she's been accused of blackmailing Kerry. Judy, fed up with Sharon's behaviour, ends their relationship, and Kevin asks Doreen to marry me.
116	Episode 37	Michael Pattinson	Denise Morgan	27 May 1980
Jock tries to help Vera get her job back, but shows less kindness to the prisoners. Kevin and Doreen are married in the Wentworth garden, and one of the prisoners meets an untimely end.
117	Episode 38	Bill Hughes	Margaret McClusky	28 May 1980
Everyone is in lockdown for the investigation. Judy is adamant Bea is to blame. Lizzie debates whether to meet the woman claiming to be Marcia, and Doreen is terrified when Sharon's killer confesses to her.
118	Episode 39	Bill Hughes	George Mallaby	3 June 1980
Helen Smart, an old friend of Kerry's, comes into Wentworth with news of Jock Stewart's bad reputation. Kerry is released but she struggles to cope. Lizzie finally meets Marcia and her daughter Josie.
119	Episode 40	Marcus Cole	Sheila Sibley	4 June 1980
Bea and Judy confront Jock with their accusation about Sharon's death. Vera becomes suspicious of Jock, after witnessing his strange behaviour, but isn't sure if she should speak with Mrs Davidson.
120	Episode 41	Marcus Cole	Dave Wothington	10 June 1980
Leanne Burke arrives in Wentworth and immediately makes trouble. Kevin helps Marcia and Josie move, but begins to doubt if they are genuinely Lizzie's family. Judy takes a stand about Sharon's death.
121	Episode 42	Leigh Spence	Denise Morgan	11 June 1980
The women decide that enough is enough and demand justice for Sharon, but no one is safe when what was supposed to be a peaceful protest ends in tragedy.
122	Episode 43	Leigh Spence	John Wood	17 June 1980
Noelene's grief turns to anger when she's bought back to Wentworth. Paul, Bea and Doreen fear Marcia is a fraud. Kerry's behaviour grows erratic, and Paul warns that she may end up back in jail.
123	Episode 44	Michael Pattinson	John Upton	18 June 1980
Thinking she has killed David, Kerry flees from the gallery. Paul does some detective work to find out if Marcia is a fraud, but Bea and Doreen ate doing some sleuthing of their own.
124	Episode 45	Michael Pattinson	Ray Kolle	24 June 1980
Helen discovers an unconscious Kerry in her flat, after David has cleaned her out and left her for dead. Lizzie tries to come to terms with losing Marcia and Josie and on the outside.
125	Episode 46	Bill Hughes	Denise Morgan	25 June 1980
The women embark on a ridiculous attempt to cover up Noelene's absence until they can unlock her from the store room. Meg intervenes when her neighbour appears to be ignoring her husband abusing their son.
126	Episode 47	Bill Hughes	Barbara Ramsay & Margaret McClusky	1 July 1980
The work release is to go ahead, to the women's delight, and the party of women chosen has some surprising additions. Vera is suspicious of Lizzie's constant supply of cigarettes and Meg seeks Paul's advice.
127	Episode 48	Marcus Cole	Bryon Williams	2 July 1980
The work release program is underway, with Erica warning dire consequences for anyone who screws it up. Gail is bought into Wentworth, and is warned not to tell the other prisoners of her crime.
128	Episode 49	Marcus Cole	George Mallaby	8 July 1980
The women find out that Gail is in Wentworth for abusing her child, and set out to make her life inside difficult. Erica and Andrew arrange a dinner date.
129	Episode 50	Leigh Spence	Dave Worthington	9 July 1980
Doreen struggles to cope after being attacked by Vince, and desperately tries to get taken off the work release program. After being released from prison, Tony struggles to find a job.
130	Episode 51	Leigh Spence	Sheila Sibley	15 July 1980
Margo is having trouble covering her bets thanks to Kay's gambling bug. Doreen, on the work release program, becomes determined to help Kevin get the delivery tender, and Judy ends up in the hospital.
131	Episode 52	Michael Pattinson	Denise Morgan	16 July 1980
132	Episode 53	Michael Pattinson	Margaret McClusky	22 July 1980
Bea gets on the work release scheme, with an ulterior motive - but Noelene and Margo set out to stop her. Judy is on the run dressed as a policewoman, and is Kay all she seems to be?
133	Episode 54	Bill Hughes	John Upton	23 July 1980
134	Episode 55	Bill Hughes	George Mallaby	29 July 1980
135	Episode 56	Rod Hardy	Ray Kolle	30 July 1980
136	Episode 57	Ron Hardy	Denise Morgan	5 August 1980
137	Episode 58	Leigh Spence	Sheila Sibley	6 August 1980
138	Episode 59	Leigh Spence	Margaret McClusky	12 August 1980
139	Episode 60	Michael Pattinson	Denise Morgan	13 August 1980
Doreen is forced to abandon her marriage to Kevin.
140	Episode 61	Michael Pattinson	John Wood	19 August 1980
141	Episode 62	John McRae	George Mallaby	20 August 1980
142	Episode 63	John McRae	Dave Worthington	26 August 1980
143	Episode 64	Rod Hardy	Denise Morgan	27 August 1980
144	Episode 65	Ron Hardy	Barbara Ramsay	2 September 1980
145	Episode 66	Mike Murphy	John Upton	3 September 1980
146	Episode 67	Mike Murphy	Bryon Williams	9 September 1980
147	Episode 68	Michael Pattinson	Sheila Sibley	10 September 1980
148	Episode 69	Michael Pattinson	Margaret McClusky	16 September 1980
149	Episode 70	John McRae	Denise Morgan	17 September 1980
150	Episode 71	John McRae	George Mallaby	23 September 1980
151	Episode 72	Rod Hardy & Juliana Focht	John Wood	24 September 1980
152	Episode 73	Rod Hardy & Juliana Focht	Coral Drouyn & Alistair Sharp	30 September 1980
153	Episode 74	Leigh Spence	John Upton	1 October 1980
154	Episode 75	Leigh Spence	Dave Worthington	7 October 1980
155	Episode 76	Mike Murphy	Denise Morgan	8 October 1980
Vera comes to work drunk, and tells Erica she is resigning. Doreen sneaks out of the hospital with the Latham baby.
156	Episode 77	Mike Murphy	Barbara Ramsay	14 October 1980
Doreen is on the run with the Latham baby, while Latham is worried out of her mind.
157	Episode 78	Rod Hardy & Juliana Focht	Margaret McClusky	15 October 1980
Latham forgives Doreen for placing her baby's life in danger.
158	Episode 79	Rod Hardy & Juliana Focht	George Mallaby	21 October 1980
159	Episode 80	Rod Hardy & Juliana Focht	Denise Morgan	22 October 1980
Jacki Nolan is pardoned. Ted Douglas tells Erica that an inspector by the name of Stuart Gillespie is coming over to investigate the running of Wentworth.
160	Episode 81	Kendal Flanagan	Ray Kolle	28 October 1980
Mr Gillespie arrives a day early and finds a lot of slackness in Erica's administration. An unknown assailant knocks Bee over the head.
161	Episode 82	Kendal Flanagan	John Upton	29 October 1980
162	Episode 83	Leigh Spence	John Wood	4 November 1980
163	Episode 84	Leigh Spence	Ian Bradley	5 November 1980
164	Episode 85	Mike Murphy	Denise Morgan	11 November 1980
165	Episode 86	Rod Hardy & Juliana Focht	Dave Worthington	12 November 1980
The pantomime goes ahead, as does the escape. Disaster strikes in the tunnel.

== Accolades ==
- Sammy Award for Best Actress in a Series – Sheila Florance (1980)
- Logie Award for Best Lead Actress in a Drama Series – Sheila Florance (1981)
- Logie Award for Best Drama Series – Prisoner (1981)
- Logie Award for Most Popular Show in Victoria – Prisoner (1981)
- Nominated: Logie Award for Best Supporting Actress in a Series – Colette Mann (1981)
- Nominated: Logie Award for Best Supporting Actor in a Series – Gerard Maguire (1981)

== Home media ==
The following is a list of DVD sets which contain individual episodes from season two or the complete season as a whole.

Title	Episodes	Release date	Format	Country	Rating	Ref.
Prisoner: 2 (Note: Content identical.in both Australia and U.S. aside from different cover art. Released as "Set 2" in the U.S.)	165	24 February 2003	VHS & DVD	AUS	ACB: M	
Prisoner: 2	165	19 December 2006	DVD	US	NR	
Volume 5	80 (Note: Also contains the final 15 episodes of season 1.)	17 March 2007	DVD	AUS	ACB: M	
Volume 6	81–96	17 March 2007	DVD	AUS	ACB: M	
Volume 7	97–112	21 April 2007	DVD	AUS	ACB: M	
Volume 8	113–128	21 April 2007	DVD	AUS	ACB: M	
Volume 9	129–144	21 May 2007	DVD	AUS	ACB: M	
Volume 10	145–160	21 May 2007	DVD	AUS	ACB: M	
Volume 11	161–176 (Note: Also contains first 11 episodes of season 3.)	18 August 2007	DVD	AUS	ACB: M	
The Complete Collection	80–165 (Note: The entire series contains all eight seasons and 692 episodes.)	29 September 2007	DVD	AUS	ACB: M	
Volume 3 (Note: The UK sets feature the same content as the Australian sets, with the only exceptions being they contain double the number of episodes and that the artwork is different.)	80–96 (Note: Also contains the final 15 episodes of season 1.)	12 October 2009	DVD	UK	BBFC: 12	
Volume 1–3	80–96 (Note: also contains the complete season one (episodes 1–79).)	30 November 2009	DVD	UK	BBFC: 15	
Volume 4	97–128	24 May 2010	DVD	UK	BBFC: 12	
Volume 5	129–160	11 October 2010	DVD	UK	BBFC: 12	
Volume 6	161–165 (Note: Also contains the first 27 episodes of season 3.)	21 February 2011	DVD	UK	BBFC: 15	
Volume 3 (Note: Re-released sets in UK-style packaging.)	80–96	11 May 2011	DVD	AUS	ACB: M	
Volume 4	97–128	29 July 2011	DVD	AUS	ACB: M	
The Complete Collection (Note: Re-release of the 2007 set.)	80–165	5 October 2011	DVD	AUS	ACB: M	
Volume 5	129–160	30 November 2011	DVD	AUS	ACB: M	
Volume 6	161–165	1 February 2012	DVD	AUS	ACB: M	
The Complete Season Two	80–165	11 January 2017	DVD	AUS	ACB: M	

=== Streaming ===
The second season of Prisoner began streaming on Channel 5's service My5 on 12 February 2024, and concluded on 10 June 2024.
