= Prisoner season 3 =

Australian drama television series

Prisoner
- Season 3
- DVD cover
- Starring: Patsy King; Fiona Spence; Val Lehman; Elspeth Ballantyne; Colette Mann; Sheila Florance; Gerard Maguire; Betty Bobbitt; Judith McGrath
- No. of episodes: 81

Release
- Original network: Network Ten
- Original release: 4 February – 11 November 1981

Season chronology
- ← Previous; Season 2 Next → Season 4

The third season of Australian drama television series Prisoner (commonly known as Prisoner: Cell Block H) premiered on Network Ten on 4 February 1981. It consists of 81 episodes and concluded on 11 November 1981.

The season is notable for the conclusion to the tunnel escape storyline which ended the previous season; the departure of Vera Bennett ("Vinegar Tits") when she accepts the position of governor of Barnhurst; the kidnapping of Erica Davidson; the arrival of new prisoners Sandy Edwards, Kate Peterson and former inmate and top dog of H Block – Marie Winter; Bea Smith's amnesia, and later, her mysterious illness which sees her step down as top dog, only to be replaced by Sandy Edwards.

== Cast ==
=== Main ===
- Patsy King as Governor Erica Davidson
- Fiona Spence as Vera Bennett
- Val Lehman as Bea Smith
- Elspeth Ballantyne as Meg Morris
- Colette Mann as Doreen Burns
- Sheila Florance as Lizzy Birdsworth
- Gerard Maguire as Jim Fletcher
- Betty Bobbitt as Judy Bryant
- Judith McGrath as Colleen Powell (Note: Colleen Powell, originally credited as Off. Powell, was credited as a recurring character, a central supporting character, and then a main character from episode 225.)

=== Special guest ===
- Mary Ward as Jeanette "Mum" Brooks

=== Central supporting ===
- Amanda Muggleton as Chrissie Latham
- Serge Lazareff as David Andrews (Note: David Andrews is listed as a recurring character from his first appearance in episode 171. He becomes a central recurring character from episode 187.)
- Olivia Hamnett as Kate Petersen
- Louise Le Nay as Sandy Edwards
- Kate Sheil as Janet Conway
- Wayne Jarratt as Steve Falkner
- Maggie Millar as Marie Winter

=== Recurring ===
- Julia Blake as Evelyn Randall
- Mary Charleston as Linda Golman
- Jane Clifton as Margo Gaffney
- Tommy Dysart as Jock Stewart
- Susannah Fowle as Lori Young
- Caroline Gillmer as Helen Smart
- Brian Hannan as Terry Harrison
- Anthony Hawkins as Bob Morris
- Leila Hayes as Jeannie Baxter
- Edward Hepple as Sid Humphrey
- Bethany Lee as Andrea Hennessy
- Alan Hopgood as Albert "Wally" Wallace
- Sue Jones as Kathy Hall
- Fay Kelton as Alison Page
- Nina Landis as Michelle Parks
- Michael Long as Mick O'Brien
- Tracey Mann as Georgie Baxter
- Ned Manning as Nick Clarke
- Tom Oliver as Ken Pearce
- Candy Raymond as Sandra Hamilton
- Wynn Roberts as Stuart Gillespie
- Gael Andrews as Sister Johnson
- Paul Bertram as Mr. Williamson
- Ernie Bourne as Peter Hope
- John Bowman as Henry
- Aileen Britton as Florence Marne
- Christine Calcutt as Mrs. O'Reagan
- Paul Colombani as Martin Richards
- Deborah Coulls as Micki Wallace
- Peter Cummins as Hartman
- Belinda Davey as Hazel Kent
- Peter De Salis as Mr. Martin
- Stefan Dennis as Peter Richards
- Rod Densley as Gerry
- Sue Devine as Tracey Morris
- Laurie Dobson as Paul Tranter
- Beverly Dunn as Mrs. Mitchell
- Marion Edwards as Mrs. Reid
- Maureen Edwards as Officer Bailey
- Jennifer Finch as Susan Page
- Simon Finch as Chris Page
- Stuart Finch as Don Page
- John Frawley as James Marne
- Bill Garner as Det. Sgt. Ross
- Jon Geros as Mike the Bike
- Terry Gill as Det. Insp. Grace
- Vince Gill as Wayne Bradshaw
- Paul Glen as John Fitzwater
- Hannah Govan as Mrs. Dyson
- Kirsty Grant as Samantha
- Gary Gray as Dr. Marsden
- Diane Greentree as Sister Franklin
- Liddy Holloway as Sister Hainer
- Denzil Howson as Mr. Muirhead
- Tim Hughes as Bazza
- Amanda Irving as Janet
- Brian James as Dr. Kennedy
- Barbara Jungwirth as Lorna Young
- Paul Karo as Det. Sgt. Rouse
- Jackie Kelleher as Gwen Hill
- Bruce Kerr as Gorgon Humphrey
- Debra Lawrence as Sally Dean
- Alix Longman as Janie Chapman
- Dina Mann as Debbie Pearce
- Kerry McGuire as Arna Johannsen
- Joan Millar as Brenda Latham
- Chris Milne as Tony Morton
- David Nettheim as Mr. Carter
- Gerda Nicolson as Mrs. Roberts
- Helen Noonan as Wendy Scott
- Reylene Pearce as Phyllis Hunt
- Anne Phelan as Myra Desmond
- Valma Pratt as Matron Swartz
- Peter Regan as Dr. Granger
- Ian Smith as Ted Douglas
- Jon Sidney as Colin Lester
- Trudy Simms as Dinah Walford
- Jentah Sobott as Heather "Mouse" Trapp
- Kate Turner as Ricky
- Joy Westmore as Joyce Barry
- Bryon Williams as Dr. Weissman
- Myrtle Woods as Amelia Humber
- John Wregg as Mr. Golman
- Paul Young as Captain Barton
- William Zappa as Del Latham

== Episodes ==
| No. overall | Episode | Directed by | Written by | Original release date |
|---|---|---|---|---|
| 166 | Episode 1 | Alistair Sharp | Rod Hardy & Juliana Focht | 4 February 1981 |
Bea, Lizzie and Doreen are trapped in the tunnel collapse. The women are locked in while an investigation goes on, a found note blames the overly strict regime for the breakout. The officers are forced to work overtime against union rules. Bea struggles with claustrophobia and fears they will not be found, Doreen is resigned to her fate. Judy and Mouse get out alive, picking up a hire van to head into the country, but Mouse is recaptured after Judy leaves her to fend for herself, having been caught speeding. Mrs Davidson stands up to Mr Gillespie in order to avoid a strike. Mouse goes to solitary.
| 167 | Episode 2 | Denise Morgan | John McRae | 10 February 1981 |
Mr Fletcher overhears Mouse telling Gaffney that Irene died in a tunnel collapse. She is convinced by Mrs Davidson to show them the tunnel to retrieve the body. Bea becomes increasingly hysterical, abandoning Doreen and Lizzie to search desperately for a way out. Chrissie makes a cake and asks Gillespie for an outdoor 1st birthday party for Elizabeth, instead he calls child welfare to remove the child. Lizzie, Doreen (minus Teddy) and Bea are rescued and taken to the hospital wing. Anne is disappointed to find Bea is not dead, as she had hoped. Mrs Davidson overrides Gillespie to end the inmate lockdown. Mouse slips Bea a note to say Anne buried the manhole and she leaves the laundry, fearing for her safety. Meg Morris returns from her honeymoon. Judy is picked up hitchhiking by Wally, an offgrid vegetarian. The psychiatrist confirms Anne has had serious mental health issues since childhood. Anne claims photos taken by Meg of Elizabeth are of her own lost child Meagan, distraught Chrissie grapples with her to retrieve them just as Bea and the officers enter the room.
| 168 | Episode 3 | Margaret McClusky | John McRae | 11 February 1981 |
Wally will not turn Judy into the police, although she warns him he would be harbouring a fugitive. Gillespie attempts to ban all TV and radio. Mrs Davidson agrees only to censor newspapers for mentions of Judy's escape. Anne is transferred off camera to a mental health institution. Judy writes to a newspaper about the strict regime at Wentworth, against Wally's advice. Doreen has new charges to face. Lizzie tries to make homebrew. The TV and radio are mysteriously "broken" again. Gaffney picks a fight as a distraction, earning a spell in solitary, while Lizzie pinches an uncensored newspaper. Gillespie demands officers work in pairs for safety, which only Vera supports, as it means compulsory overtime. Lizzie writes to the Ombudsman, dictated by Bea, in an official sealed envelope. Bob worries Meg is working too hard and suggests she resigns, even as Fletcher struggles to fill the new staff rota. The officers threaten to go to the union and Mrs Davidson complains about Gillespie's hardline methods to the authorities. Doreen denies knowing who emptied her bank account. Gillespie is caught opening Lizzie's letter, resulting in his suspension. Mrs Davidson rescinds Gillespie's double staffing, avoiding a strike. Lizzie's homebrew is discovered in the rec room by Vera, and she collapses.
| 169 | Episode 4 | Ray Kolle | Leigh Spence | 17 February 1981 |
Vera performs CPR on Lizzie until the ambulance takes her to hospital. Shaken Vera attempts to investigate the homebrew but it has disappeared. Mrs Davidson accepts that Lizzie was solely responsible, but asks Bea to get the women to be nicer to Vera. The TV is still broken and the women offer to split the repair bill. Retired handyman Sid Humphreys finds a valve has been deliberately removed to no-one's surprise. Depressed Lizzie wishes she hadn't been saved and is refusing to eat. The hospital doctor contacts a journalist about Lizzie's situation, which makes the news, depressing Lizzie further. Mrs Davidson rescinds more of Gillespie's unpopular staffing arrangements and officially informs the women that Gillespie has left the prisoners. Judy meets Mikki, Wally's daughter, who volunteers to help her crusade for prison reform and rehabilitation. Doreen explains to her solicitor why she took Chrissie's baby, but the escape attempt is not going to look good in court. Meg visits Lizzie in hospital with a spirit-lifting letter from her daughter Ellen.
| 170 | Episode 5 | George Mallaby | Leigh Spence | 18 February 1981 |
Wally worries about Mikki being arrested for helping Judy, and tries to convince both Judy and Mikki to give up the campaign. Everyone is trying to keep Lizzie from finding out she won't be eligible for a visa until she's better. Judy wants to pull out of the video, but Micky convinces her to carry on. Doreen's sentence is extended, but it could have been worse without Mrs Davidson's support in court. At the hospital, Lizzie is ready to return to Wentworth, with a special diet. Sid Humphreys has been appointed as prison handyman. Mikki contacts the journalist, Mr Hopkins, to arrange to hand over Judy's videotape in a carpark, not trusting the post. Hopkins gets a partial numberplate from the distinctive old van, hoping to track her down to get a personal interview. The station manager gives him 24 hours, after which the police will have to be informed. The videotape isn't played that night, disappointing Judy and Mikki. Chatting, Sid inadvertently tells Lizzie about the visa issue, causing her to flee to Mrs Davidson in tears. Mr Hopkins gets an address for the van, but has to race to get there ahead of the police. Judy confides in Mikki about growing up as a lesbian, her first love Sharon Gilmour who got 2 years for drug possession, leading to Judy's own deliberate conviction for drugs so she could join her in prison, Sharon's murder by a prison officer, and her deceased friends Leanne and Irene Nagel. Mr Hopkins arrives just ahead of the police. Wally tries unsuccessfully to convince the police the van had been stolen and returned. As Judy and Mikki look on, Wally is arrested. Vera attempts to comfort Lizzie, but is rebuffed. Judy leaves on foot.
| 171 | Episode 6 | Denise Morgan | Mike Murphy | 24 February 1981 |
The TV journalist Mr Hopkins visits the prison to talk to Lizzie who is wallowing in self-pity, but as he can't get her a visa, she's not interested in being released. Back in the city, Judy stays with old friend and prostitute, Helen Smart, reimbursing her for lost income as the flat will be unavailable. Bea arranges for Doreen and Mouse to have a row to distract the officers so she can convince Sid to lie about the TV being broken, so it won't be removed and the women can watch the broadcast about Wentworth. Clips of Judy's video are played, but they beep out Gillespie's and Jock Stewart's names. Interviewee Mrs Davidson states the strict conditions were a temporary experiment, educational classes have been tried and failed before, Sharon's death was an accident, and Jock Stewart was relocated for his own safety. Not satisfied, Judy has Jock Stewart tracked down as a regular visitor to a local massage parlour, run by Doris. Sid brings Lizzie flowers as an apology. Judy gets a makeover and gets a job at Doris's parlour hoping to have an opportunity to murder Jock as revenge for Sharon's death, despite being warned by Helen she will have to deal with the male clientele regardless. Lizzie thanks Vera and they have a heart to heart, but it won't get Lizzie any special treatment. Idealistic young new teacher David Andrews arrives, hoping to educate future mothers of the tough school children he has taught, and learns the strict prison rules. Clearly nervous, he is heckled by Bea, but later wins Vera over and asks her for advice. The women decide to give him another chance, but he still can't connect with them. Lizzie writes to Ellen. Clocking off at the brothel and unsure if she can bear to go back, Judy just misses Jock leaving, who was in with another girl. At his next visit, his usual girl is not available and he is assigned to Judy's room. Judy attempts to stab him, but he restrains her.
| 172 | Episode 7 | Alastair Sharp | Mike Murphy | 25 February 1981 |
Jock Stewart blackmails Judy to work for him or he'll tell the police about her whereabouts. Sad and disgusted by what she has come to, Judy initially only has $150 and Jock beats her up. The women don't see the point of prison education, teasing Doreen about fancying Mr Andrews when she defends the value of learning. Judy vows to get revenge, no matter what it takes. Sid brings in small gifts for Lizzie and wangles her a walk in the garden. Meg Morris allows it but warns him not to bring any more gifts. Judy asks Helen to pay the $800 remainder of Doreen's inheritance, into a bank account in Doreen's name. Helen protests, nevertheless Judy makes an anonymous phone tip for police to follow Jock Stewart if they want to find the fugitive Judy Bryant. Jock tries it on with Judy, just as the police enter and arrest them both. Inmate Phyllis Hunt suggests Mr Andrews asks the women what they are really interested in learning. Kevin Burns starts divorce proceedings from Doreen, Mr Andrews offers to help her read the paperwork. Judy returns to Wentworth on a far longer sentence, but feels vindicated by Jock's arrest. The women greet Judy warmly. Mr Andrews upsets Lizzie by pointing out her age. Judy is supportive of the education programme. Doreen jumps at the opportunity to help Mr Andrews redecorate the library after hours. Mr Fletcher walks in on Doreen kissing Mr Andrews.
| 173 | Episode 8 | Dave Worthington | Juliana Focht | 3 March 1981 |
Bea tells Doreen to blame Mr Andrews to save a spell in solitary, but she worries he'll lose his job. Mr Fletcher reports the kiss to Mrs Davidson. Mr Andrews claims he had not noticed Doreen's crush on him. The education programme will continue, but as she's his only regular pupil, classes can only resume if there is at least one other inmate attending. Sid volunteers to drive Lizzie for her hospital check up with Meg and they stop off at a park on the way back. He wonders what life would be like if Lizzie stayed with him when she is released. Vera assumes the worst about Mr Andrews. He tries to interest more of the women in attending a new every day skills course. New inmate Sandra Hamilton is a bit too inquisitive, raising suspicions for Bea.
| 174 | Episode 9 | Bryon Williams | Juliana Focht | 4 March 1981 |
The women have sent Sandra to Coventry (stopped speaking to her) as they think she's a spy. Three turn up to Mr Andrews's modern living skills course, including Doreen, who gifts him a pair of handmade knitted socks in secret. He later shows them to Vera as an example of how the women can learn and improve. Vera makes a disparaging comment to Doreen about the socks, leaving her distraught. Sandra has made a lot of phonecalls, which looks like special treatment to the others. Bea, Lizzie and two others turn up to class, initially angry he's betrayed Doreen's secret gift to an officer. They accept his explanation and stay on to see what the course is about, enjoying it more than they thought. Sandra is knocked unconscious while cleaning the showers, but insists to Vera she slipped. The women attempt to get to know Sandra, but her answers only make them more suspicious. Vera warmd to Mr Andrews, but backs off when she finds he has a girlfriend. Sandra requests to share a cell with Judy, who is livid. Sid hasn't shown up for work, Lizzie is concerned. Sandra tries to make friends with Judy by undressing provocatively, but Judy is not fooled. The lessons are going well, but Doreen is too embarrassed to go back. Doreen's divorce requires counselling to see if the marriage can be saved, she's not interested. Sandra attempts to bribe Judy to speak with drugs, Judy marches her straight to Bea. Sandra is forced to admit she is a journalist doing a follow-up to the story of the tunnel escape. Mrs Powell stops by Sid's house to find him collapsed, calling for an ambulance.
| 175 | Episode 10 | Denise Morgan | Leigh Spence | 10 March 1981 |
The women discuss whether or not they can trust Sandra, who finds that what they want to tell her isn't what she wants to hear. Sid has had a stroke and won't be returning to work. A fight breaks out in the van bringing three new inmates, rich kid Jennifer is injured and heads to the infirmary, and feisty Georgie goes straight into solitary for kicking Mr Fletcher. Widowed herbalist Evelyn Randall is introduced to the women. Lizzie gets permission to visit Sid in hospital. Jennifer pays her parking fines to leave immediately. Sandra threatens to write a piece blaming the women for the prison conditions, not the officers. Georgie rips up the uniform and trashes her cell, catching Sandra's interest. Doreen still loves Kevin but doesn't expect him to wait three years for her release. Sandra convinces Doreen to return to class, pretends to help her with an assignment, then deliberately gets the answers wrong to embarrass her, aggravating Bea. Evelyn gives Doreen a herbal remedy for a stomach condition, which given she turns out to have a conviction for poisoning manslaughter, may not have been wise. Bea swipes Evelyn's file from Mr Andrews, planting it to set up Sandra, outing her as a journalist to Mrs Davidson when the tactic fails. The health department arrive looking for Jennifer because a passenger on her recent flight from Malaysia has a notifiable infectious disease, but she has already left. Doreen is getting sicker - has she been infected?
| 176 | Episode 11 | Margaret McClusky | Leigh Spence | 11 March 1981 |
Sandra has been placed in solitary for the rest of her sentence. Poisoner Evelyn sets out to cure the women of the tropical disease, should it break out, to prove she is not a dangerous crank. Bea lays down the law with the women about not taking Evelyn's dodgy herbal remedies, but few are paying attention. Georgie's friend Mike the Bike is turned away by Mr Fletcher as she's still in solitary . Mr Andrews makes Georgie a deal to come to classes and wear uniform, in return for allowing the visit. Evelyn's requests for herbal library books are refused, but she is grudgingly allowed decorative pot plants by Mrs Davidson. Judy helps Evelyn find ingredients in the garden. Georgie comes to class, but hits out at Bea when she thinks the women are laughing at her. Lizzie brings Evelyn plants from Sid's garden after a visit, also offering to hide her mould cultures in the laundry. Lizzie briefly leaves Evelyn alone with the officers tea trolley. Georgie stands up to Bea and heads straight back to solitary. Nurse Franklin goes home unwell after morning tea and is still too unwell to come to work next day. Lizzie eats one of Evelyn's homemade biscuits and a herbal tea, and tells her about a time when the officers were drugged with sleeping pills using the staffroom coffee urn. In the morning, Lizzie has stomach pains and diarrhoea, but the nurse isn't in so Meg calls the doctor. Mr Andrews asks Georgie to do an intelligence test, which she struggles with, ripping it up and crying. Bea is livid to find the women have been helping Evelyn, heading straight to Mrs Davidson to tell her what's been happening. Evelyn collapses in front of Bea and Mr Fletcher.
| 177 | Episode 12 | Ian Bradley | Mike Murphy | 17 March 1981 |
The infectious disease doctor suspects typhoid. Lizzie and Evelyn are put on antibiotics whilst waiting for the test results. Despite being ill, Evelyn can't resist making pointed anti-medical comments. Georgie is one of the prisoners who may be infected, Mr Fletcher carries her bodily to the doctor for an antibiotic injection. Cell Block H is put on quarantine, including the officers. Evelyn convinces Doreen to retrieve a jar from her locker in order to help Meg. Sandra is desperate to be released and demands to call her editor to break the epidemic story. Mrs Davidson slaps her in the face. Bea and Judy are now both sick, so Georgie moves in with Doreen. Georgie calls away the nurse to deal with Judy, giving Doreen an opportunity to give Evelyn's concoction to Meg. Sandra makes a break for freedom at the gate, Mr Fletcher has a rifle pointed at her, will he shoot?
| 178 | Episode 13 | Barbara Ramsay | Mike Murphy | 18 March 1981 |
Sandra is brought back inside. Georgie wants to nurse Judy but Vera kicks her out for her own safety. The antibiotics aren't working and Meg is getting worse, not better. Sandra finds she will be charged with attempted escape and is put into solitary, leaving the male officers to sleep elsewhere. Worried Doreen flushes the rest of Evelyn's herbal mixture down the toilet. Lizzie tells the doctor that Meg has had a herbal remedy, Evelyn gleefully claims success but will not hand over the details. Evelyn is released from hospital where Georgie threatens her to make more mixture for Judy. Evelyn attempts to convince Mrs Davidson to give her access to the garden. After she leaves, the doctor suggests allowing it so they can find out what she's up to. The doctor confiscates the resulting mixture but Evelyn has already stashed a jar. Vera catches Georgie giving it to Judy. The women rib Vera when they find her in the prison shower block. Judy is getting better and Vera is beginning to believe Evelyn's potion might actually be working. The potion analysis comes back as having a mild purgative action. Lizzie is out of hospital, Judy is up but still weak. The doctor arranges to search Evelyn's cell. Evelyn is rude and arrogant to the doctor. Smitten Judy tries to kiss Georgie, who reacts angrily, calling her sick and slapping her face. The doctor believes Evelyn may have deliberately poisoned inmates and staff so she could then cure them.
| 179 | Episode 14 | Ray Kolle | Marcus Cole | 24 March 1981 |
The doctor organises toxicological tests. Georgie is back in solitary. The doctor confronts Evelyn about responsibility for the sickness outbreak, which she denies. Mrs Davidson doesn't believe Georgie's version of events until Judy confirms it, although she thought Georgie understood and is mortified. Palm tree pollen is the culprit but how did it get into the prison? Bea is feeling better. The quarantine is lifted as the real cause of the disease is discovered. Evelyn admits knowing the pollen's effects, but denies administering it, Mrs Davidson shakes her by pointing out the criminal consequences - more time on her sentence. Margo Gaffney is due to be released in a few days. Lizzie confirms to Bea that the pollen came from Sid's garden, Bea vows revenge. Wayne Bradshaw arrives to visit Margo, Mr Fletcher recognises him as an ex-con. Bea confronts Evelyn, who under pressure, admits putting the pollen in some of the food. She runs to Mr Fletcher, but the women all deny threatening her. Georgie has trashed her cell again. Evelyn is attacked, but Mr Fletcher thinks she is making it up. Evelyn asks for a prison transfer which is refused. Sandra Hamilton explains the attempted escape to the visiting judge, saying she was utterly panicked by fear of disease. The charge is dismissed, displeasing Vera. Mr Andrews wonders if Georgie might be partially deaf and asks the doctor to examine her. Angry Sandra winds up Evelyn, who throws food at her. The women are over-nice to Evelyn, making her nervous. Rope and turpentine are missing from the garden shed - a noose is found and removed from Evelyn's cell, confirming a transfer does need to take place, until then she is not to be left alone with the other women. The women set up a booby trap in Evelyn's cell using part of Sandra's ruined jumper and the missing turps, unfortunately it leaves her with serious burns. The officers recognise the jumper - Sandra, who was not involved in setting the trap, is taken off to solitary and may not be released as planned.
| 180 | Episode 15 | Dave Worthington | Marcus Cole | 25 March 1981 |
Sandra protests her innocence, Mr Fletcher gives her half a day to find out who was responsible. Margo Gaffney calls boyfriend Wayne to arrange a pickup but the number is out of order. Meg offers to drop him a note. Sandra offers to write a damning article about the prison in return for the truth about the fire, but it may not be enough for Bea. Georgie needs a routine surgical procedure on her ears, but is scared it may make her hearing worse. Bea suggests to the officers that Evelyn may have started the fire herself in order to get a transfer. Mr Fletcher searches Evelyn's cell and finds the missing turps, jumper and rope - despite being fairly sure this was planted by the women, Mr Fletcher agrees that it is unlikely Sandra started the fire and she is released, alongside Margo Gaffney. Georgie is still angry with Judy about the attempted kiss. Margo has been running a gambling ring in Wentworth, leaving Bea to look after the money until she can find a way to get it past the officers. Margo is happy to see Wayne, although disappointed by the state of Wayne's flat. Mr Andrews wants to run a pottery class, which Mrs Davidson offers to attend in support. Sandra's article has been published, it doesn't mention the women, who aren't impressed and Bea regrets helping her be released. Wayne is behind on the rent, but takes Margo out to a fancy bar to celebrate, along with a new watch. Georgie's surgery is a success. Margo goes to sign on for unemployment benefit, hoping to get a job quickly but it is slim pickings and she is an ex-con. The first pottery class goes well. Georgie's friend Mike and her brothel keeper mother Jeannie, visit her in hospital, Georgie isn't happy to see her. Margo tries to visit Bea but is turned away by Meg.
| 181 | Episode 16 | Denise Morgan | Juliana Focht | 31 March 1981 |
Ex-con Ken Pearce writes to Bea thanking her for helping his daughter. Judy asks Bea if she would be hypothetically happy for her child to be a lesbian, Bea has to admit she would want them to be married with children, not have a hard time like Judy. Vera insults Georgie and she kicks off. Doreen is made to move in with Judy so Georgie can bunk with Bea and Lizzie. Judy tries to apologise to Georgie, but she hits herself and blames Judy, earning Judy a stint scrubbing the floor, while Vera insults her. In class, annoyed Doreen winds up Georgie until she attacks her. Mr Andrews appeals to Bea to look after Georgie, but Bea won't take sides. Georgie finds a world of new sounds in the garden. The tennis ball plan is foiled by Vera and Mrs Davidson confiscates Margo's illicit money. Mrs Davidson suggests to Meg she could act as a prison careers officer. Doreen tells Bea she thinks Georgie told Vera about the tennis plan. Bea threatens Georgie with a beating, but her reaction softens Bea's resolve. Georgie apologises to Judy for getting her into trouble. Georgie's mother Jeannie Baxter arrives as a new inmate. Meg's husband Bob is worried the new responsibility will take even more of her time. Wayne's mate Charlie offers Margo a job as a nightclub stripper for $100 a day, she wavers, but when Meg's alternative is a cleaning job, Margo isn't impressed. Bea vows to protect Georgie. Bob refuses to help Meg with finding jobs for "crims" and is fed up with prison talk, later he apologises for over-reacting. Judy is now too scared to talk to Georgie. Margo starts practicing her stripper moves. Wayne has a new job as a dishwasher and a win on the horses to celebrate. Doreen deliberately starts a fight with Georgie, but when Mr Fletcher blames Georgie, Bea sets the record straight, sending Doreen to solitary.
| 182 | Episode 17 | George Mallaby | Juliana Focht | 1 April 1981 |
Judy is angry with Bea for taking Georgie's side and transfers to the garden along with Mouse. Hazel tries to mediate a truce to no avail. The feud causes two factions to form, stirred up by Georgie, although Judy is adamant she has no designs on being top dog. Mr Andrews suggests setting up the library as a second rec room until it blows over, Mrs Davidson eventually agrees after seeing the tension first hand at the pottery class. Georgie fakes an assault to get Judy's group into trouble. Meg's husband Bob is concerned there may be another riot. Margo starts the new job, only to discover Wayne owes substantial money to a loan shark, and is unemployed again. Margo asks Meg if the cleaning job is still open and gets Wayne a job at the club. Mouse and Hazel take an opportunity to help themselves to other people's buy-up (commissary), stashing it in the library, worsening the tension. Wayne's mate Bazza has planned a payroll robbery to solve their debt problemd. A mass brawl breaks out in the canteen, Bea is knocked unconscious.
| 183 | Episode 18 | Bryon Williams | Leigh Spence | 7 April 1981 |
Margo has big plans for the payroll money. Administrative delays mean an ambulance isn't called - when she comes to, Bea refuses to go to hospital, but later collapses and is rushed to hospital. The women apologise to Mrs Davidson but are punished regardless. Georgie challenges Judy acting as leader in Bea's absence. Meg visits Margo, but they're out casing the job. Jeannie Baxter regrets Georgie's tough childhood and tries to reach out. Missing her own mother, Doreen tries to convince Georgie to talk to Jeannie before she's released. Mr Andrews begins to teach Georgie to read. Jeannie wants to go straight, which no-one believes except Lizzie. Last minute, Georgie asks Jeannie to visit her at Wentworth. The payroll robbery begins on a bad foot and goes downhill from there. Bazza fires at the police. Wayne, Margo and Bazza barricade themselves in a haberdashery shop with two elderly hostages. The payroll haul is lower than expected. Margo wants to surrender but Bazza and Wayne have other ideas.
| 184 | Episode 19 | Margaret McClusky | Leigh Spence | 8 April 1981 |
Armed police surround the shop. The hostages react very differently to the siege situation. The siege makes the tv news and the women speculate the female robber, confirmed by Vera to be Margo, will soon be joining them at Wentworth. Wayne and Bazza demand a getaway car; Margo requests Meg Morris act as a go-between with the police. Against orders, she agrees, hoping to resolve the situation. Wayne and Bazza agree to let the older hostage go, if Meg takes her place. Meg thinks Wayne and Margo may surrender, but Bazza is a different story. Trainee officer Sally Dean begins her stint in Wentworth, supervised grudgingly by Vera, who is extra strict as a result. Mr Fletcher doubts Miss Dean's reason for taking the job, and Bea challenges her authority. Mr Andrews has recommended Georgie does not get parole yet so she has more time to learn, which Vera gleefully leaks to Georgie. The siege ends in a bloodbath.
| 185 | Episode 20 | Denise Morgan | Mike Murphy | 14 April 1981 |
Margo Gaffney is back in Wentworth following the siege. The women go on strike in the gardens in response to Mr Andrews' report on Georgie. Miss Dean is confused by the different styles of the officers and doesn't cope well left alone briefly in charge. Meg tells Margo that Wayne has died. The officers set up an armed guard on the fence, suspecting a mass breakout. Vera admits to Mr Andrews that she told Georgie about the report. Lizzie is taken ill and returns inside. Distraught Margo charges the fence and is almost shot by Vera. The women return inside to avoid anyone being hurt, their point having been made. The women coach Georgie to memorise some text to fool the parole board. Miss Dean overhears their plan and informs Vera, who calls Georgie's bluff. Margo is looking for someone to blame for Wayne's death, attacks Georgie and is transferred to A Block. As revenge, the women set up Miss Dean with false information about hidden contraband.
| 186 | Episode 21 | Barbara Ramsay | Mike Murphy | 15 April 1981 |
Miss Dean tries to model herself on Vera. Lizzie is turned down for a day release. Meg has lined a supermarket job up for Georgie and asks to speak to the parole board. Bea insists Mr Andrews withdraws his report to the parole board in order to get the women back to lessons, which he does. Georgie is given parole with conditions, including continuing her education. Bea tearfully wishes her well. Lizzie has a volunteer visitor, Ivy, following which she is obviously up to something. The women trick Miss Dean yet again, and she goes to hit Doreen, witnessed by a furious Vera. Miss Dean resigns after a heart to heart with Vera. On the outside, Georgie and Mike have a fight and she leaves him. Meg arrives to take Georgie to her new job, only to find she's gone...to her supermarket job, all by herself. Lizzie's not at roll call and has left a note for Doreen. What is she up to?
| 187 | Episode 22 | Alastair Sharp | John McRae | 21 April 1981 |
The officers put the women on lockdown assuming they're hiding Lizzie as a prank. On the run, Lizzie cons her way to some new clothes and cash, heads for a bar, then gets the bus to visit Sid's nursing home for his birthday. The women and the officers separately speculate about Lizzie's whereabouts. Lizzie is disappointed to find Sid is away visiting family. Drunk and having missed the last bus, the nursing home find her a bed for the night. The women wind up Vera about Lizzie's mythical hiding place. Meg asks Vera to swop shifts last minute so she can entertain husband Bob's important American clients. Meg is annoyed to find Bob, embarrassed by her job, has told the clients she's a social worker, however they recognise Meg from the Gaffney siege, catching him in a lie. Next day, Lizzie rings Wentworth to tell them she's on her way back. Mr Fletcher has figured out Lizzie escaped using Ivy's stolen visitor pass. Chrissy Latham is back from A Block. Lizzie is determined to head back on her own, rolling up to the gate in a taxi. The women discuss various improvements to prison life. Bob issues Meg with an ultimatum.
| 188 | Episode 23 | Ian Bradley | John McRae | 22 April 1981 |
Bob attempts to apologise to Meg. Lizzie is interviewed by police about her big day out. Meg considers a change of career. The conjugal visiting suite is set up in the garden shed, only for married women or those with a long term partner. Hazel is the first to enjoy this special visit with her partner and children, but not all goes well. Vera checks up on Chrissie Latham's visitor Mick O'Brien and finds he is an ex-con from Barnhurst prison, as well as potentially Elizabeth's father.
| 189 | Episode 24 | Dave Worthington | Juliana Focht | 28 April 1981 |
Mrs Davidson explains the visiting suite to journalists, whose interest seems focused on the salacious side. Bea's enforced boycott of the visiting suite doesn't go down too well with the women. Meg decides to apply for a job as a probation and parole officer. Bea negotiates better conditions for the visiting suite, but at a cost.
| 190 | Episode 25 | Ray Kolle | Juliana Focht | 29 April 1981 |
Bea's backdown on the boycott results in a power struggle with the women. Chrissie fights with Bea and signs up for classes to impress the parole board. Tensions run high in the laundry and Bea steps down as top dog. Ken Pearce's daughter Debbie unexpectedly joins him on his private visit with Bea, leaving her disappointed. A tabloid journalist publishes an unpleasant article naming Bea and Ken. Bea takes fake credt as if it was a deliberate act to protect the others, but can't keep up the pretence. Bob makes breakfast for Meg as she starts her new job as welfare officer. Chrissie's boyfriend Mick proposes to her, but she's unsure. Debbie visits Bea to try and convince her to dump Ken.
| 191 | Episode 26 | Denise Morgan | Leigh Spence | 5 May 1981 |
Bea starts to believe Ken may really care for her and lines up another visit, while whiny Debbie tries her best to get Ken and his estranged wife Marian back together. Having spoken to Bea, Ken gets a position at Wentworth with Mr Andrews, helping long serving prisoners. Vera spitefully agrees to let Marian Pearce visit Bea. Marian confronts Ken to think about his true feelings for Bea, whilst she considers her own for Ken. Despite reservations, Chrissie Latham decides to marry lovestruck Mick to increase her chances of parole, and of getting full custody of Elizabeth. She gets parole and heads off with Mick. Marian decides she wants to try again with Ken, and he agrees, ultimately apologising to heartbroken Bea and giving up his Wentworth job.
| 192 | Episode 27 | George Mallaby | Leigh Spence | 6 May 1981 |
Chrissie is angered by Mick's well meaning efforts to be romantic, blowing hot and cold. Doreen's penpal Peter Hope wants a photograph, but neither has told the full truth, with significant consequences. Chrissie visits Elizabeth at the children's home, but is depressed to find she isn't allowed to take her out for the day without a chaperone, how about Meg? Mr Andrews convinces Bea to take up braille typing instead of laundry work. Mick thinks Chrissie is only using him to get Elizabeth back. When she confronts him for not marrying her sooner, he confesses he is using a fake name and on the run after a long ago prison escape. Censorship of mail is reintroduced due to Doreen's actions.
| 193 | Episode 28 | Margaret McClusky | Geoffrey Nottage | 12 May 1981 |
Meg supports Mick and Chrissie getting full custody, but they are only given a day a week initially. Heading to the zoo, Chrissie has PTSD about the caged animals and refuses to take Elizabeth back to the home. The women are down on Doreen for causing mail censorship to come back. Judy smooths things over. Doreen is embarrassed when penpal Peter comes to visit. Bea's new role depends on the lucrative prison laundry operating without her, so the women go all out to prove it. The officers refuse to supervise Bea, even part-time, threatening strike action. The women call a strike of their own.
| 194 | Episode 29 | Bryon Williams | Geoffrey Nottage | 13 May 1981 |
Meg convinces Mick and Chrissie to return Elizabeth to the home, dropping them back down to supervised visits. The police look into Mick's background. Meg arranges legal advice on custody, and the pair decide to get married. The women have fun ruining their clean laundry stockpile as the strike continues. The officers are not for backing down, and begin a vendetta against Mr Andrews. With time to reflect, Doreen regrets being hard on her penpal, Peter. He visits Doreen to ask if they can be friends, she's not sure. Mrs Powell spitefully claims Mr Andrews incited the women's strike, which he denies, but feels forced to resign in order to save the education programme. Bea calls off the strike. Latham's boyfriend Mick is arrested.
| 195 | Episode 30 | Denise Morgan | Marcus Cole | 19 May 1981 |
Frantic Chrissie calls Meg for help, who gets her released uncharged, saving her parole, but Mick is being sent back to Adelaide to stand trial for his former prison escape. He asks if she will wait for him. Chrissie is devastated by Mick's sentence. Union rep Mrs Powell is promoted, but is warned not to abuse her new authority. The women decide to make life difficult for the officers, starting by sabotaging the laundry equipment. Vera and Mrs Powell lock down the women, searching their cells for missing workshop tools, which turn up planted in an officers locker. The women are given cleaning duties, baiting the officers with veiled threats, vandalising the cleaning equipment and stealing bleach when left briefly unsupervised. The officers discuss working in pairs, but that means yet more overtime. The cell searches become more intensive when they believe inmates may be trying to steal knives from the canteen, and Mrs Davidson locks down the women. With tensions running high, the officers discuss getting extra staff from another prison. Mrs Powell threatens an officer strike if Mrs Davidson doesn't deliver.
| 196 | Episode 31 | Barbara Ramsay | Marcus Cole | 20 May 1981 |
The inmate strike continues. The women are unhappy the officers are now carrying weapons. Mrs Davidson calls a meeting to discuss their concerns, which soon collapses as neither side will back down. Chrissie's estranged brother Derek finds her to make an offer of accommodation, but it comes with an unacceptable compromise. Following a minor scuffle where Mrs Barry is injured, Mr Fletcher decides not to put Judy in solitary as she was provoked. Mrs Davidson takes back the officers guns, so Mrs Powell calls an officer strike. Chrissie is struggling to find an honest job and is tempted to go back to prostitution. The women stage a sit-in in the dining room. Mr Douglas from the department suspends Mrs Davidson and burly male officers from Pentridge are brought in to manhandle the women back into their cells. Bea is forcibly transferred to Barnhurst Prison in the middle of the night. The women, including Judy and Doreen, barricade themselves in their cells until both Bea and Mrs Davidson return. Chrissie is caught with a man leaving her flat by Meg Morris.
| 197 | Episode 32 | Dave Worthington | Juliana Focht | 26 May 1981 |
Mr Fletcher locks down the prison to avoid leaks to the press. Bea wakes up at Barnhurst to find they have their own Vera Bennett clone, Mrs Roberts. Bea assures top dog and old acquaintance Marie Winter that she has no designs on her spot, however Bea is angry to find new cellmate Tracy Morris is bringing in magic mushrooms for Marie and sidekick Janie. Janie attempts to win Bea round, but Bea is having none of it. Chrissie and Derek's abusive father has now died, but Chrissie wants to stand on her own. Derek's wife Brenda is relieved and tells Chrissie as much. Derek explains to Brenda why he feels so responsible for Chrissie's situation, which seems to change her mind. Free to roam, Lizzie slips food to the women until she's caught by Mrs Powell. Chrissie has found a shop job. Meg is unconvinced by Chrissie's explanation about her male visitor, but keeps quiet about Latham's probable illegal activity, so she is granted custody of Elizabeth. The women begin orchestrating fires. Mrs Davidson is invited back as governor, but has some conditions of her own. The women agree to lift the barricades and end the hunger strike.
| 198 | Episode 33 | Ray Kolle | Juliana Focht | 27 May 1981 |
A power struggle erupts in Bea's absence. Mrs Powell fears a riot will ensue. Margo and Judy get into a physical fight. Margo Gaffney is given a far longer sentence than she expected for the payroll robbery. While Judy is in solitary, Margo announces to the women she's the new top dog. Mr Fletcher temporarily considers a change of career, while Mrs Davidson sets out her vision for the prison. Bea is enjoying the gentler pace at Barnhurst, but Marie Winter and her gang drug Bea as a joke. She finds the officers turn a blind eye for an easy life. Bea attacks Marie and winds up in solitary. With Margo proving un-cooperative, Erica decides to have Bea brought back to Wentworth. The prison van crashes en route.
| 199 | Episode 34 | John Harper | Leigh Spence | 2 June 1981 |
Dazed, and with memory loss, Bea stumbles away from the crash. A passing motorist gives her a lift back to her former home, where she is surprised to a new tenant in situ. Margo's cronies start throwing their weight around, bullying Doreen and stealing the women's buy-up. The prison officer in the van crash is in a coma, the driver has died. The police believe the crash may have been deliberate. A new male officer starts, Terry Harrison, an old colleague of Mr Fletcher's. Judy and Doreen stash excess buy-up in Margo's cell and let him overhear a conversation in order to instigate a cell search to implicate Margo, but it backfires. Having remembered an address, after some redirects, Bea takes refuge at Mum Brook's house, jeopardising her parole. Mum realises she has amnesia and tries to convince her to get medical help. After some soul searching, Mum visits Meg Morris to let her know.
| 200 | Episode 35 | Denise Morgan | Leigh Spence | 3 June 1981 |
Mum tells Bea her daughter is dead, but she doesn't believe her and goes to the school, before Meg and Mum return. The van officer has woken and clears Bea of causing the crash. Margo cracks down on dissenters, including forcing Judy to back down by threatening to damage her pacemaker. Mum asks Bea to leave, which she agrees to, just as the police arrive and arrest both women. Mr Fletcher has put a bet on with Mr Harrison that he can't get Vera to go on date with him. After initial set backs, she finally agrees and it goes better than they expected. Bea is confused and panics when she finds out she's in prison for murder. The officers assume she is faking. Vera tries harsh tactics to try and get Bea to break. Mum tells the women Bea has amnesia, but they don't believe her either. Lizzie sneaks into solitary only to find Bea doesn't remember her. Doreen tries but Bea just gets upset. Margo takes Mum's watch, which she needs to remember to take her medication. Bea attacks Margo, experiencing a flashback to murdering her husband's girlfriend. She lets Margo go and runs to her cell, crying.
| 201 | Episode 36 | Peter Brennan | Geoffrey Nottage | 9 June 1981 |
Bea is distraught and tries to scale the fence. Margo bides her time to get revenge for the attack and menaces Mum. Young shoplifter with attitude Nick Clarke is assigned Meg Morris as his probation officer. She is concerned about his flatmates dodgy lifestyle and visits his wealthy parents to see if he could live with them - his father is adamant that he cannot. Opinion is divided on whether or not Bea is faking. A week on, Bea finally speaks to the psychiatrist. He confirms she is genuinely amnesiac and could be eligible for compassionate release. Bob and Meg entertain his colleagues at home, but are interrupted by the police calling about Nick Clarke. She leaves to intervene, resulting in him being released without charge. Margo arranges for Mum's diabetic pills to be stolen. Bea has night terrors and is comforted by Mum, who then discovers her pills have been taken. Next morning, Mum is unwell, collapsing on the bed after Bea leaves to go to the showers.
| 202 | Episode 37 | Bryon Williams | Geoffrey Nottage | 10 June 1981 |
Mum is taken to the infirmary. Vera is determined to prove Bea is faking. Margo plots revenge. Vera and Terry go out again. They kiss, but he turns down her offer of a coffee, not wanting a one night stand. He doesn't let onto Mr Fletcher the bet is won, and pays up. Meg finds Nick Clarke a warehouse job. One of his friends has been arrested and he expects Meg to help, but she can't. Meg tries to get the police to drop the charges on Mum, but no deal. Margo and her cronies drag Bea out of her cell. She comes to shut inside a dark store cupboard, bringing on flashbacks of the tunnel collapse. Margo visits Bea in solitary to gloat, but Bea has now regained her memory and lays down the law.
| 203 | Episode 38 | Ian Bradley | Marcus Cole | 16 June 1981 |
Bea and Mum go to court. Margo offers to testify against Bea in exchange for a transfer to Barnhurst, but it is not going to happen. The psychiatrist states Bea has amnesia. Margo says she's faking. Mr Fletcher testifies there is a history of aggravation between the two women, so the jury find mitigating circumstances for the escape. However, this looks bad for Mum. Meg, delayed by Nick Clarke, arrives just in time to testify but it makes the case look worse, not better.
| 204 | Episode 39 | Margaret McClusky | Marcus Cole | 17 June 1981 |
Bea retracts her amnesia claim to save Mum from heading back to prison. Back at Wentworth, she makes out she was faking all along, but privately admits to Mrs Davidson her memory only came back when she was trapped in the store cupboard. Vera and Terry arrange another date. He talks her into putting Margo's transfer request to Mrs Davidson, then tries to take the blame to protect Vera. Mrs Davidson will not transfer Margo, regardless. Nick Clarke calls Meg at home late at night, threatening suicide. They call the police, but Bob forbids her from going herself, and they have an argument. It turns out to be a hoax. Next day Nick breaks a window, Bob chases him down and brings him back to the house: in the ensuing row, he offers Nick a job and a room, expecting him to fail. Terry gives Margo the bad news, bringing her some tobacco as compensation. Doreen overhears the conversation. Bea hands Margo's bookie responsibilities to Lizzie, while the women give Margo the cold shoulder. Bob is pleased with Nick's first day at work. Terry brings Vera flowers and asks if he can stay with her, as he's lost his temporary accommodation, she agrees. Meg is unwell but needs to drop her reports off at the office. Nick takes the initiative, and Bob agrees he can drop the reports off. Margo asks Terry to put a racing bet on for her, which he agrees to. Doreen assumes Terry is sleeping with Margo. Margo tells Vera that Terry is a bent screw. Meg's boss finds out he's staying with Meg and Bob, which is against regulations.
| 205 | Episode 40 | Barbara Ramsay | Juliana Focht | 23 June 1981 |
Terry moves in with Vera, she finds Margo's betting slips in his pocket. He admits taking the bet, and Vera bursts into tears. Margo has stolen Judy's tape recorder and her cell is trashed. Lizzie backs a long shot called Hammerhead, which comes last, while the other women gloat over their wins, at inflated odds. Lizzie doesn't have enough funds to pay off the bets. Margo asks Terry for a bottle of Scotch in return for some information, but secretly records the conversation.
| 206 | Episode 41 | Ray Kolle | Juliana Focht | 24 June 1981 |
Bea bails Lizzie out of trouble by having her give the women back their original bets and IOUs for the rest. Lizzie tries a con but is caught out. Margo tells Terry about Lizzie's bookmaking enterprise in return for the bottle of scotch. He's not bothered, however Vera informs Mrs Davidson but is then disappointed when Lizzie is transferred to the maternity wing, instead of solitary. Terry and Vera have an argument about how to handle the inmates, and he storms off. They make up the next day. Nick Clarke is developing a serious crush on Meg. Bob Morris asks Nick to pick up an important client. He implies to Meg that Bob may be having an affair, which looks more suspicious when Bob rolls in late and drunk. Margo transfers to the kitchen to try and get Doreen on side, but she's having none of it. Margo pinches a knife. She demands Mr Harrison organises her transfer to Barnhurst or she'll release the tape. Bea asks Mrs Davidson if they can run a book in the prison, in return Mrs Davidson asks Bea to participate in the Needs Committee. Mr Fletcher finds Margo collapsed and injured in her cell.
| 207 | Episode 42 | Dave Worthington | Leigh Spence | 30 June 1981 |
Bob invites Meg to lunch with the new client, Arna, to assuage her concerns. Bob tells Nick not to interfere in their personal life. Arna is genuinely interested in the prison system and asks if she can visit Wentworth. Margo doesn't know who hit her but assumes it was Terry Harrison. She sends Vera to look for the tape and bottle, but there is no sign. The prisoners are interviewed, but all have an alibi, even Doreen, who was in the toilet unwell. Bea suggests an officer may be responsible. Mr Harrison is upset to find Mr Fletcher doubts his word about not bringing in scotch. Mr Harrison visits Margo in the infirmary, she claims he is threatening her. Mr Fletcher arrives in time to escort Margo to solitary. Doreen keeps going to the toilet, but is in a surprisingly good mood. All the tapes in the prisoners cells have been mysteriously taken, played, and returned. Mr Fletcher is asked to show a visitor round on his afternoon off, which he's much happier about when he meets Arna, although she's leaving that night. Mr Harrison confesses to Mr Fletcher he did bring in the scotch, promising never to do anything like it again. With Bob working late, Nick cooks a fancy meal for Meg and gives her a present. When she says he's like a son to her, he throws a tantrum and runs out. Bea finds Doreen drunk and rambling about bashing Margo, she hands the tape over to Bea. Nick is chucked out of a bar, angrily throwing a bottle through the window.
| 208 | Episode 43 | Alastair Sharp | Leigh Spence | 1 July 1981 |
The search for the tape continues - Bea has hidden the tape in her cell. Nick is arrested and heads off to prison, spurning Meg's attempt to apologise for the misunderstanding. Mrs Davidson visits her manipulative elderly mother. Mr Fletcher has all of the women's recorders and tapes confiscated as a security risk. The new Prisoners Needs Committee meets with Mr Fletcher to request the return of the tapes and recorders, which he refuses. Mrs Davidson has dinner with Meg and Bob and complains about her mother. Bea hands the tape to Mr Harrison on the basis of a favour in return, but Vera is sure that Bea has also kept a copy, which indeed she has. Erica visits her mother again, with her brother, James, who is her mother's favourite, but it still ends in an argument. Vera catches Judy disposing of the empty scotch bottle, pausing awkwardly before telling the women to get back to work. Mrs Davidson orders the confiscated tapes and equipment returned, reprimanding Mr Fletcher and Mr Harrison. Bea lets Mr Harrison know he still owes her and implies she has a copy of the tape. Erica's mother collapses at home. Mr Harrison tells Vera he is both resigning and moving out of her flat to avoid the scandal affecting her as well. Vera bursts into tears as he walks away.
| 209 | Episode 44 | David Minter & Margaret McClusky | John McRae | 7 July 1981 |
Vera is too upset to work and goes home early. At home, Vera persuades Mr Harrison to have one last attempt at retrieving the tape. Mr Fletcher appeals to Bea that Mr Harrison, a decent officer, is likely to resign, and the replacement could be another Jock Stewart, but Bea feigns ignorance. Erica's mother needs urgent brain surgery. Mrs Davidson and her brother see their mother before the surgery, and a family secret is revealed, which may explain why she had been a distant mother, if they had more time to talk. Unfortunately her mother does not survive the operation. Back at Wentworth, Mrs Davidson is emotionally disorientated and has to be convinced to go home. Mr Harrison fails to get the tape from Bea, but when he asks her to come with him to hand in his resignation, she relents and says she'll hand it over. But her cell has already been turned over. Mr Harrison assumes rightly that Vera is responsible. Together they find the tape hidden in a sugar container, and hug joyfully. The pair return everything else neatly to Bea's cell, and all is well for now. They discuss marriage. New inmate, attractive, athletic, Michelle Parks is brought in on remand for theft from her employer, claiming she was a scapegoat because she had refused to work late. She was out running alone at the time of the robbery, and the police can't locate the only witness. Michelle is bored and making disruptive noises. Finding Michelle is an Olympic hopeful from her coach, Mr Fletcher allows her to run in the grounds, then around the perimeter fence, with his accompaniment, but she leaves him for dust and he is worried when he loses sight of her. Meeting back at the gate, she impresses him with a 5 minute mile. Judy has an unexpected visitor, Lori, who is a stranger to her. Asked why she is there, Lori says "I think you could be my mother".
| 210 | Episode 45 | Bryon Williams | John McRae | 8 July 1981 |
Lori's adoptive parents told her about Judy when her escape made the news. Judy needs time to process and asks her to return the next day. She needs Mrs Davidson's permission for the extra visit, but doesn't want to give the reason, so it is declined, however, later finding out from Mr Harrison the visitor was Judy's daughter, the visit is agreed. Mr Fletcher is convinced Michelle is innocent and asks Meg about legal aid for her. Michelle entertains the women with her story of leaving Mr Fletcher in her dust. Lori and Judy meet in the garden. Judy is vague about why Lori was adopted, and tells her she got herself put in prison to help a friend. Lori says she will visit again next week, although it is a long way to come. Hazel spots them and reports to the women, who assume Lori is a girlfriend, so Judy storms off. She tells Doreen that Lori is an old friend's daughter. Michelle meets with legal aid Tony, who tells her that her prospects are grim. No one can locate this "old lady" who saw her training in the park. She asks Mr Fletcher if her coach Henry can visit again as a special visit. Lori steals jewellery from a shop, allowing herself to be easily caught. Next day she arrives as an inmate on remand, distressing Judy. She asks Mr Fletcher if she can testify at Lori's hearing but they've already left. Coach Henry asks if he can train Michelle at Wentworth, but there can't be preferential treatment, so Henry offers to do keepfit classes for the women, which Mr Fletcher thinks is a good idea, his having failed, and Mrs Davidson agrees. Bea is dismissive but agrees to go along with it for Michelle's benefit. Meg invites Mrs Davidson to dinner, adding Vera and Terry Harrison to the group. Judy tries and fails to climb the fence, desperate to get to Lori's hearing and is dragged back to her cell. Mrs Davidson is sympathetic and agrees Lori can be placed in Judy's cell, to Vera's horror. Doreen moves back in with Bea, hurt to think she is being kicked out for Judy's special friend, as Judy hasn't told her Lori is her daughter, and tells Lori not to say anything to the other women. She is worried the others will hate her for giving up her child. Michelle tries to convince Henry to produce the witness, or if that fails any witness, and pay her to lie. He is reluctant, but she is adamant she is innocent.
| 211 | Episode 46 | Peter Brennan | Kendal Flanagan | 14 July 1981 |
Everyone is puffed out by the Keep-Fit class, including Mr Fletcher. Mrs Davidson and brother James disagree about selling the family home, but are affected to find letters which prove that their parents really did love each other. The police have found Michelle's fingerprints at the crime scene and she really needs the mysterious old lady witness to be found. Mr Fletcher volunteers to visit the park to join the search. Vera maliciously puts Lori in the laundry working with annoyed Doreen, who tricks Lori into pouring blue dye into the washing machine, invoking Vera's wrath. Vera accepts she was tricked, but tells her to wise up. Judy has words with Doreen. Lori meets with Meg, giving her a nasty attitude. Meg warns her a bad report could result in a severe sentence, to no avail. Mrs Davidson sends for Judy who tells Lori to co-operate. Lizzie has returned. Sid has written to say he's living with family but not getting on with son Gordon. She won't be told she's too old for the keepfit class, with hilarious results. In the park, Henry has found Amelia Humber, a sweet little old lady who loves watching the athletes, and has heard of Michelle. She feels sorry for Michelle and agrees to help, even before Henry promises her a new TV. He calls Michelle to tell her Mr Fletcher needs to be in the park that night, even though it is pouring with rain. With the trial tomorrow, she convinces Mr Fletcher to look in the park one last time. Lori confronts Doreen, and a fight is broken up by Bea, who is impressed with her guts. Judy finally tells Bea the truth about Lori, who though shocked, reassures her that everyone will understand why she gave up Lori for adoption. Remembering what happened to the last person to cross Doreen, Bea and Judy rush to the cell, only to find both Doreen, and the knife she took from Margo, have gone.
| 212 | Episode 47 | David Stevens | Kendal Flanagan | 15 July 1981 |
Doreen has set up a booby-trap for Lori, but gets Vera instead, who blames Lori and hauls her off to solitary. Vera takes great delight in telling Lori that Judy is a lesbian. Doreen comes clean to Mrs Davidson, switching places in solitary with Lori. Lori is not concerned about her mother's sexual orientation. Judy explains Lori was conceived before she had come to terms with her sexuality, giving Lori up as she didn't think she could provide for her. They embrace. Lizzie is taken to Sid's for a visit by Mrs Powell, Sid is now partially paralysed. Lizzie makes lunch and tries to set him up with meals on wheels. At Michelle's trial, all the evidence points to her being guilty. Her ex-boss testifies she had threatened to get even when she was sacked for persistent absence. Henry leaves the court to pick up witness Amelia, but she is not at home. Bea plans a party for Lori's 21st birthday the next week. Lori is ready to leave now she has answers and agrees to behave from now on. Mr Fletcher heads to the park in his lunch break. Michelle insists she was running between 6 and 7, but the judge clearly doesn't believe her story.
| 213 | Episode 48 | Ray Kolle | Juliana Focht | 21 July 1981 |
Mr Fletcher comes across Amelia in the park. Amelia recognises Michelle's photograph and claims to remember seeing her the night and time of the robbery. Mr Fletcher whisks her off to court, resulting in the trial being adjourned for the day. Lizzie asks the women to knit things for Sid, getting transferred to the kitchen so she can make him a cake. Mrs Powell agrees to deliver the cake, however Vera trashes it looking for contraband. Doreen begins stashing food for Lori's party, angering Bea. Returning from court, Michelle speaks privately to Bea. On the stand, Amelia gives a plausible reason for not coming forward sooner, and stands her ground under questioning. Michelle is acquitted. Outside court, Mr Fletcher hears her promise Amelia a new TV and begins to have doubts. Henry and Amelia are uncomfortable with their actions, but believe they did the right thing. Bea confides to Lizzie and Doreen that Michelle was indeed guilty, having bungled the original alibi she had set up for the theft. Henry arrives at Wentworth to continue with the Keep- Fit program, but no-one is interested now Michelle has left. New inmates Kathy Hall and Dinah Walford arrive. Kathy is placed in H Block, Dinah in D Block. Michelle gifts Mr Fletcher an expensive pair of new running shoes. He walks off, disgusted. Vera upsets Lizzie by taking her out of the kitchen, blaming Mrs Powell. Sid visits Lizzie, collapsing in the garden on his way out. Bea warns Kathy about Terry Harrison, oddly it seems they may already know each other. Kathy finds a threatening note left on her bed. Lizzie and Doreen bring out the contraband food but Vera intervenes and cancels the party, as Bea feared. Mr Harrison has a big surprise waiting for him when he meets the new prisoner.
| 214 | Episode 49 | Barbara Ramsay | Juliana Focht | 28 July 1981 |
Terry Harrison advises Kathy to keep quiet about their former marriage for her own safety. Sid has simply overexerted himself. Lizzie asks about the possibility of early parole to look after Sid. Mrs Davidson confirms with Sid that he likes the idea. Lizzie visits Sid at home to gift him his cardigan. He proposes marriage, she needs time to think. Her early parole is denied. Bea warns Kathy about getting too friendly with Mr Harrison, and Doreen plays a joke on Kathy. Kathy comes clean that they used to be married many years ago. She is now remarried to an inmate at Pentridge. Lori is told to blame Judy's influence for her actions, and is released. Terry owns up to Vera about his terrible marriage to Kathy, which ended on bad terms. He wants Kathy to stay at Wentworth so he can keep an eye on her, since she has had death threats. Bea tries to figure out who is sending the threatening notes and narrow it down to Mouse and new inmate Dinah, neither of whom have any obvious motive. The electrics are playing up - Mr Harrison narrows it down to a booby trapped kettle in Kathy's cell. He is forced to report the threats situation to Mrs Davidson. Kathy swears she has no idea who is trying to harm her. Over a cup of coffee, Kathy assures Bea she isn't involved with drugs. Bea swipes the mug out of her hand. The coffee is mixed with ground glass.
| 215 | Episode 50 | Dave Worthington | Leigh Spence | 4 August 1981 |
Bea and Judy search Kathy's cell for more boobytraps. Mr Fletcher asks Vera about Mr Harrison's involvement with Kathy. Vera eventually blurts out about the marriage, leaving him shocked. Inspector Grace arrives to interview Kathy. On the way to the interview, the riot alarm is set off. Left briefly alone, Dinah sneaks up and bashes Kathy unconscious. Inspector Grace is annoyed at being kept waiting, and leaves. Dinah denies responsibility to Bea for bashing Kathy, but shortly afterwards she leaves Wentworth. New inmate middle-class Alison Page arrives on a short sentence. She has no idea about prison life and is scared of both the officers and the women. Meg suggests she needs help with her gambling addiction. Mrs Davidson suggests to Mr Harrison that Kathy should be transferred, but he talks her out of it. Kathy is bruised, but fine. Since Dinah has left, there shouldn't be any more trouble. Bea telephones Sid and tells him Lizzie is miserable. Sid finds out from Meg that Lizzie's parole has been denied, but it turns out she's worried about his family's reaction if they got married. He doesn't care, and presents her with an engagement ring. Inspector Grace returns, Kathy claims to know nothing about any criminal gang activities. Alison is rude to Lizzie. When Judy tries to be friendly, Alison pushes her away in hysterics. The other women begin to descend on Alison.
| 216 | Episode 51 | Alastair Sharp | Leigh Spence | 5 August 1981 |
Alison runs away when accosted by Doreen, managing to scratch Bea's face by accident. Mr Fletcher warns Terry Harrison not to trust Inspector Grace. Vera allows Sid to visit Lizzie, offering congratulations on their engagement. Captain Barton will officiate and Mrs Davidson agrees to give Lizzie away. Meg visits Alison Page's husband. Meg is unable to convince Alison to calm down and try to make friends with the women. Mr Harrison looks into Kathy's attack. Nothing new has happened since Dinah left. Lizzie is getting excited about getting married. Mrs Davidson takes her shopping for a fancy new outfit. However, Sid's step-son, bank manager Gordon visits Lizzie, unhappy about the wedding, which is due the next day. Alison's family visit, which only makes her more upset. Her children are having a hard time at school. Vera forces Alison to work in the laundry, where the women wind her up until she flees. Terry blows off a date with Vera, but won't tell her why. He tracks down Dinah in the red light district looking for information, only for Meg to spot them walking off together. Dinah's pimp works for local gangster McNally who may be involved in the attacks, which Terry reports to Inspector Grace. Vera invites Meg to dinner while Bob is away. Terry, who was hoping they could be alone, comes out with an impromptu marriage proposal in the locker room. Alison deliberately electrocutes herself using a wire coat hanger.
| 217 | Episode 52 | Bryon Williams | John McRae | 11 August 1981 |
Bea does CPR until Mr Fletcher arrives to take Alison off to the infirmary. Meg is despatched to bring Alison's husband to the prison. Terry Harrison and Vera have got engaged, planning a short engagement. Vera is happy, telling Meg she will leave the service after they're married, handing in her resignation. Miserable Lizzie tells Sid she can't marry him, running off without telling him why. The women are surprised to find the wedding is off. Sid's son Gordon has accused Lizzie of only wanting Sid for his house, and will refuse to let Sid see his grandchildren if the marriage goes ahead. Terry doesn't arrive for a night shift, instead turning up back at the flat, battered and bleeding. He doesn't know who attacked him and doesn't want to involve the police, although he tells Inspector Grace informally. He questions Kathy, who still says she knows nothing, even when he physically shakes her, which Doreen witnesses. She eventually recalls meeting someone called John at a pawn brokers. Mrs Davidson visits Sid to tell him why Lizzie cancelled the wedding. Sid angrily confronts Gordon and heads off to Wentworth, but Lizzie won't see him, and he is sent away upset. Mr Harrison asks questions at the pawn brokers, getting short shrift. Inspector Grace warns him to back away before he gets more hurt or possibly dead. Bea uses her phonecall to get Gordon to visit her. She threatens him with a visit from a soon to be released bank robber. Back at the flat, Vera opens the door to be confronted by an unseen assailant with a pistol.
| 218 | Episode 53 | Denise Morgan | John McRae | 12 August 1981 |
The gunman forces Vera to ring Terry at work, but Vera tells Terry that she's gone down with the same virus as her mother, who is dead. Terry realises that something is wrong, so he takes Mr Fletcher with him and goes to Vera's flat. Terry keeps the gunman talking, dropping Kathy's name liberally, while Mr Fletcher knocks him out from behind. Inspector Grace is pleased to have a link to gangster McNally, shaken and injured Vera is not. Vera also thinks Terry is still in love with ex-wife Kathy, so she breaks off the engagement and kicks him out. Bea visits Alison in sickbay with some wedding cake and tries to convince her to make friends. She is placed in Judy's cell for company, but gets off on a bad foot. Sid's son Gordon comes to ask Lizzie for forgiveness. She visits Sid to give him the good news, Vera is not interested in her story. The day attendance centre project is gathering momentum. Alison's neighbour starts cooking for her family and her son has been kicked off the football team for punching a bully. Alison is interested in self-improvement. Mrs Davidson offers Alison a job in reception, but warns her this may cause some resentment from the other women. Vera becomes furious as prisoners shouldn't handle confidential files, and has to be sent home. Kathy is warned by a friend to stay inside for safety as there are rumours that someone is trying to kill her. Envious Doreen continues to threaten Alison, however Bea sees the advantages and decides to support Alison, as long it is on Bea's terms, of course.
| 219 | Episode 54 | Margaret McClusky | Kendal Flanagan | 18 August 1981 |
Alison is getting on well in the reception work, if not with the other women. Mrs Davidson gives Alison permission to take typing lessons. Kathy's parole comes through. To avoid being released, she steals from the kitchen to try and get her sentence extended. Bea says it is not enough, so she steals a handbag from Mrs Bailey. Vera finds the stolen goods on a cell search but Terry convinces her their problems would be more likely to be resolved if Kathy is released, so she lets Kathy off. Mrs Davidson is offered a possible halfway house to rent. Kathy sabotages the washing machine so that it catches fire, hoping to be punished, but it is blamed on an electrical fault. Without Alison, husband Don is struggling with his business and his children. Doreen and Kathy attack Alison in front of her family during their visit. Mr Harrison intervenes and sends Doreen and Kathy to the Governor, suggesting Doreen was the principal antagonist. Doreen is charged with assault and sent to solitary, whilst Kathy just gets extra duties and loss of privileges. Vera meets with Ted Douglas at the Department, as she is going to apply for the Governorship of Barnhurst. Mr Douglas is delighted she is applying, even though he has not always agreed with Vera in the past.
| 220 | Episode 55 | Peter Brennan & Coral Drouyn | Kendal Flanagan | 19 August 1981 |
Don is furious after the assault on Alison. Don has work problems because he is constantly behind and is losing contracts. The women are tasked with repainting the laundry after the fire. The officers find out about Vera's job application. Mrs Davidson has given her a good reference. Hazel Kent threatens Alison to get her file to find out what has been written on her parole application. She is upset to find that Vera has put in some very damaging references. Alison manages to replace the file without being caught. Hazel's parole has been pushed back for 3 months and she attacks Vera, packed off kicking to solitary by Mr Fletcher, putting another two months on her sentence for assault. Vera wonders if Hazel has seen her comments on the file. Doreen comes out of solitary with three months added to her sentence. Kathy is due to be released in two days. She decides she has to assault someone to extend her sentence, picking Vera for her attack, but Terry intervenes before it goes too far. Once again, Terry manages to convince a furious Vera it would be better for Kathy to be released, rather than let it affect Vera's career prospects. Spaced out Kathy tells the women about the foiled attack. The women think it is strange Kathy is not being punished. Bea threatens Alison to get hold of other prisoners' files, despite her concerns about the effect on her own release if caught. She confesses about Hazel's file to Vera, who is not at all surprised, and demands to be locked into her cell out of fear of retribution. Mr Fletcher reads the riot act to the women to leave Alison alone. Sid and Lizzie are cosily settling in together. Terry makes an anonymous phonecall to the dodgy pawnbrokers to tell them Kathy is being released in the morning. Terry accompanies Kathy to the gates, assuring her she will be safe, then heads back inside. Within minutes she is thrown in the air and left for dead by a hit and run driver.
| 221 | Episode 56 | Barbara Ramsay | Juliana Focht | 25 August 1981 |
The gate guard sees the incident and finds Kathy dead in the road. He calls for an ambulance, while Wendy in reception rings the police and informs Mrs Davidson. Terry arrives just in time to see Kathy's body being loaded into the ambulance. Inspector Grace warns Terry that he and Vera may be implicated in the death due to his extended involvement and personal history. Alison demands to see Mrs Davidson to ask for protection, but won't provide any details. Doreen assumes Alison has been giving information to the officers and attacks Alison yet again, interrupted by Mr Fletcher. Alison is put into isolation for her own protection, although Mr Fletcher is less than sympathetic about her snooty attitude. Doreen infuriates Mrs Davidson and is sent straight back to solitary. Inspector Grace wants to know who knew when Kathy was being released, but it is everyone at Wentworth. He finds out about the unreported prior threats and attacks on Kathy from the officers. Doreen refuses to say anything at all; Alison says what she can, which isn't much, but mentions Dinah. Bea implies the officers are more likely to be involved than the women. He upsets Lizzie by interrogating her on her return, but she knows nothing. Inspector Grace angers Vera by pointing out that she had a motive to have Kathy killed, and she throws him out of her flat. Vera gives Terry an earful, but he promises not to get her into any more trouble. They reconnect and he asks her to reconsider their engagement over dinner. Vera asks for time to think. Meg advises Don to get formal support and to consider Alison getting paid employment on her release. Janet, Don's helpful neighbour tells Don she is in love with him. He lets her down gently, but she still takes offence. The women discuss how Kathy's attempts to get extra prison time kept coming to nothing. Bea accuses Terry of murder, which he denies. Bea reads his tea leaves, saying she sees a uniformed arm holding a telephone. Terry smashes the cup after Bea has left the room.
| 222 | Episode 57 | Ray Kolle | Juliana Focht | 26 August 1981 |
Vera finds Terry sweeping up the fragments of his broken mug. Bea warns the other prisoners about Terry and the women start hinting that they know he had Kathy murdered. Terry has a short fuse at work. He nags Vera about their engagement, but she refuses to give him an answer. He gets drunk alone at home. Don's troubled son Chris has hit a teacher and run away from school. He is unable to find Chris and the police are informed. Alison is told on his visit to Wentworth. Chris then returns home, claiming the teacher had insulted his mother. Lizzie has another home visit to see Sid. He has some chest pain while working in the garden, then falls asleep on the sofa. Lizzie can't wake him up. She rings the prison to say she isn't coming back. Mrs Davidson realises something is wrong. She arrives and calls a doctor to notify the authorities about Sid's death. Lizzie is given permission to attend Sid's funeral. Vera is told she has been appointed as the new Governor of Barnhurst. She tells Terry the engagement is off: he grabs hold of her, but she slaps his face and runs off. Vera tells Mrs Davidson about her new job: Mrs Davidson congratulates Vera. Don has a work accident on a building site. Terry storms out of the building. Back at his room, he is confronted by Dinah and a gun wielding thug
| 223 | Episode 58 | Alastair Sharp | Wayne Cameron | 1 September 1981 |
Terry is forced into a car at gunpoint, observed by two men watching his flat. A man called John Fitzwater admits he was behind Kathy's death. He wants Terry to inform on a prisoner transfer, threatening to kill Vera if Terry refuses. Don has injured his back and won't be able to work for a while. Meg is keen to get Alison released. Mrs Davidson suggests Alison contacts the Prison Reform Group to get someone to look after the children as Don is confined to bed. Alison's children are temporarily placed into a foster home. Sid's funeral takes place, led by Captain Barton from the Salvation Army. Inspector Grace tells Terry to co-operate with John, who is part of the McNally gang. Terry admits to Vera that he tipped off McNally's gang to prove that she was involved with them, he also clearly held a grudge about events in their marriage. Vera decides to inform Inspector Grace, but he already knows and isn't interested. The prisoners celebrate Vera leaving Wentworth to become Barnhurst's new Governor. Bea tries and fails to get information about Vera's replacement. Meg discusses Alison's children with Myra Desmond from the PRG and also mentions the plans for a day centre for prisoners. Alison tells Don that she wants to get a job when she is released. Myra looks after Alison's children. The armed thug, "Wacka" sees Terry talking to Inspector Grace. Outside the prison, Terry and Vera argue as a car approaches unnoticed. A gun is pointed at them from the car window.
| 224 | Episode 59 | Dave Worthington | Wayne Cameron | 2 September 1981 |
Terry has been shot dead. Inspector Grace interviews shaken Vera and gets a brief description of the shooters, he also admits to Mr Fletcher that he knew about Terry's involvement in Kathy's death. Vera bursts into tears while talking to Meg about Terry, spending the night at her house. The women are surprised, but not sad, to hear about Terry's death on TV. Inspector Grace has found the shooters car. The pawnbroker has been arrested for handling stolen goods, but key suspect John Fitzwater has flown to another state. Alison visits Don in hospital. She is unhappy with having ex-prisoner Myra looking after her children but Myra finally wins her round. Returning to Wentworth, she apologises to Bea who decides to give her another chance. Vera comes in for her last day. The officers plan a leaving party for Vera, who is hiding her feelings and doesn't want their pity. Lizzie understands Vera only too well, how she puts up a shield to avoid being hurt. The women say their own farewells to Vera. Lizzie is content that Sid had a good funeral. She learns that Sid has left her his house. Sid's son Gordon is angry and accuses her of tricking Sid, then is thrown out by Mrs Davidson. Vera Bennett avoids the officer organised party and she leaves Wentworth for the last time.
| 225 | Episode 60 | Bryon Williams | Gary Conway | 8 September 1981 |
The women bet on who will replace Vera and tease Mr Fletcher for not getting the Barnhurst job. Officer Powell is offered a temporary position as Acting Chief Prison Officer, potentially permanently if her work is satisfactory. Mr Fletcher is asked to keep an eye on her, somewhat unwillingly. Lizzie is initially happy to be paroled, but then realises Sid won't be there. Lizzie tells Bea that she wants to give the house to Gordon. Doreen says she will need somewhere to live when she's released, giving Lizzie a new reason to keep the house, and she asks Meg to find a solicitor. Judy and Doreen steal some headed paper and use the typewriter in reception to put up a joke notice. Mrs Powell wants to punish Alison, but Mrs Davidson points out that if Alison had been supervised properly, someone would have noticed her typing the notice. Gordon threatens Lizzie during his visit and Bea has to be restrained by the guards. Mrs Powell is not happy about supervising the work party and wants to make it a union matter, however Mrs Davidson tells her to decide if she's a union rep or a senior officer. Bea, Doreen, Lizzie and Mouse are among the six women chosen for the work party to clean the day centre. Lizzie grieves for Sid and finally comes to terms with his death.
| 226 | Episode 61 | Denise Morgan | Gary Conway | 9 September 1981 |
Bea writes a letter to Gordon, delivered by Meg, who hasn't read it. Gordon agrees to let Lizzie have the house until her death. A bottle of booze is produced, courtesy of A Block. Mr Fletcher catches them with the booze, but turns a blind eye. Mrs Powell seems to be turning into the new Vera. Don tries to work too soon and heads back to hospital. Upset Alison leaves her desk, going to her cell to cry, falling foul of Mrs Powell, who grabs Alison, then Alison pushes Mrs Powell back. Mrs Davidson refuses to put Alison on an assault charge. Judy sympathises and plans are hatched to get Mrs Powell back. Meg has taken in Alison's children. The braille typewriter project is back on the cards for Bea. At the day centre, the women and Mr Fletcher arrive in civvies. There is lot of dirty work to do and it looks like there has been a rough sleeper. Mouse is too initially too scared to leave the bus due to abandonment issues as a child. Mrs Powell tries to circumvent Mrs Davidson to report the assault by getting support from Mr Fletcher, but he's not up for it. Mr Fletcher tells Mrs Davidson he wants to resign.
| 227 | Episode 62 | Margaret McClusky | Kendal Flanagan | 15 September 1981 |
Mrs Davidson phones the Department to try to get a replacement for Mr Fletcher and makes it clear to Mrs Powell that her promotion might be at risk if she doesn't take back the report on Alison. Mrs Powell is not impressed. She hopes Mr Fletcher will change his mind given time. Alison is miserable and cries in her cell. She asks about escaping, the women tell her it is not worth it. She attempts to persuade Mrs Powell, to no avail. The work party go off to the day centre. Nosy neighbour Mrs Reid tries to find out what organization Mr Fletcher and the others come from. Lizzie gets permission from Mr Fletcher to buy milk from a local shop, and meets a young boy called Martin, who has just been thrown out of the shop as a known shoplifter. Lizzie steals some chocolate and gives it to Martin. Alison's children have gone into care, and they will have to sell the house as he hasn't been making the mortgage payments. She's too upset to work. Bea storms off to see Mrs Davidson, after calming down, she suggests Judy as Alison's replacement in reception. Bea tells Mrs Powell the women are on strike, just for her orders, until she withdraws the charge against Alison and that it won't look good that she is the only officer who can't control the women. Mrs Powell feels obliged to drop the charges. Alison is happy she is being released immediately. Realising the women have had her back despite her earlier attitude towards them, she thanks Judy and they hug. Sandwiches have gone missing, could there be a ghost? Mr Fletcher grudgingly pays for the replacements. The day centre "ghost" comes down from the ceiling. Lizzie and Doreen grab hold of him.
| 228 | Episode 63 | Coral Drouyn | Kendal Flanagan | 16 September 1981 |
The "ghost" is Peter Richards, who was forced into acting as a getaway driver for a robbery, and is in hiding from the police. Young Martin is his brother and has been sneaking in food. Doreen takes a fancy to Peter. The women try and convince Peter to talk to Meg. Nosey Mrs Reid tries to find out more about the day centre. Lizzie tells her it is for "loonies". Judy reluctantly agrees to take over Alison's job in reception. A group of students are protesting outside the prison. Mrs Davidson tells the officers to ignore the protesters. However, Mrs Powell is pushed to the ground by one of them and demands that the police arrest the student, Andrea Hennessy. Law student Andrea gets three months for assault and is put into a cell with Judy. Andrea has a terrible attitude and provokes Mrs Powell into hitting her, interrupted by Mr Fletcher. Andrea annoys the women by writing on the walls, then tries to buy Judy off with a bar of chocolate she stole from Doreen. In retribution, Bea and Doreen play pranks on her, resulting in her being scalded in the shower. Andrea tells her friend Linda that she believes that Mrs Powell sabotaged the shower. Andrea's student friends, Linda and Ricky, plan to break her out. Andrea is desperate to get out in time to speak on the tv about the "cause". Mrs Powell engineers a uncomfortable "getting to know" you meeting with Mr Fletcher.
| 229 | Episode 64 | Peter Brennan & Wendy Jackson | Juliana Focht | 22 September 1981 |
Mr Fletcher is not falling for Mrs Powell's ruse, as he believes she is just trying to influence him to forget that he saw her hit Andrea. She acts upset, then gives him the silent treatment. He withdraws the report to keep the peace. She smirks as he walks away. Mrs Powell needs his signature on her own report and goes to the day centre in uniform. She tells Mrs Reid the women are from Wentworth. A little later the police are called to the centre to investigate a "complaint", but they can't find anything wrong, to Mrs Reid's annoyance. However Doreen and Lizzie think that the police have come to get Peter, and persuade him to escape. Andrea tries to apologise to Judy. Judy tells Andrea that she's unpopular with the other prisoners because of her "know-it-all" attitude, but offers to keep an eye on her. Andrea looks smug. Peter tells Doreen that he will meet Meg. Meg tries to persuade him to give himself up: she gives him two hours to decide. Andrea attempts to escape during an outdoor recreation period, pre-arranged with her friends, asking Bea for help to create a distraction. Shots are fired, the women sit down, the officers raise the alarm and pull Andrea back inside. Linda and Ricky take a potshot at the guards as they make their getaway. Andrea blames the other prisoners, and refuses to talk to the police until she has a lawyer present. She plants the idea in Judy's head that Bea should have helped her escape. Bea convinces Mrs Davidson not to suspend the trips to the day centre. Judy confronts Bea and walks off with Andrea arm in arm. Andrea collects newspaper cuttings about Mrs Davidson, and puts them in an envelope. Doreen takes a food parcel and sneaks out of the day centre to find Peter.
| 230 | Episode 65 | Ray Kolle | Juliana Focht | 23 September 1981 |
Mr Fletcher realises Doreen is missing. Mrs Reid threatens to hold a meeting against the centre. Andrea gives Judy a fake letter to read and post, then swops it for the one containing the newspaper cuttings about Mrs Davidson. Peter is hiding out in a boat house with Martin. Martin is having an asthma attack and he's getting worse. Mr Fletcher is furious with Mrs Powell for coming to the centre in uniform. Bea thinks it was Meg who called the police, but Judy says not, and they have an argument over it. Mrs Davidson warns Colleen that her temporary senior officer rank is at risk. Mrs Davidson asks Meg what she knows about any possible reason for Doreen's escape: Meg doesn't mention Peter. Linda and Ricky receive the letter with the newspaper cuttings and work out where Mrs Davidson lives. She comes home to find a window broken, and Linda and Ricky lying in wait.
| 231 | Episode 66 | Ian Bradley | Wayne Cameron | 23 September 1981 |
Andrea's friends blindfold Mrs Davidson and bundle her into a delivery van. Linda rings prison authority manager Ted Douglas from a call box to demand Andrea's release. The gun turns out to be a replica. Mrs Davidson manages to get hold of a pair of scissors. Doreen tries to get an inhaler for Martin from a chemist's, but fails. Instead they leave him at a hospital. The kidnappers send a lock of Mrs Davidson's hair to a TV station. Linda threatens to cut off one of Erica's fingers. Bea is convinced that Andrea is planning another escape. The prisoners learn about the kidnapping from an unconfiscated radio. Meg finds the hideout and tells Doreen that Peter is not wanted by the police. Doreen doesn't tell Peter the good news, instead she tries to persuade him to change their hiding place. Judy and Bea "kidnap" Andrea and barricade themselves into a cell. Whatever happens to Mrs Davidson, they will do to Andrea. Mrs Davidson takes an opportunity to escape, but Linda sees her and opens fire.
| 232 | Episode 67 | Barbara Ramsay | Wayne Cameron | 29 September 1981 |
Linda misses (by a mile) and Mrs Davidson escapes, only for the kidnappers to catch up with her. New prison officer, Janet Conway arrives, just out of training school. Miss Conway seems familiar to Bea. Miss Conway tells Meg she thinks she remembers one of the women from a long time ago. Bea wants the kidnappers to know Andrea is being held, but Mr Douglas refuses to contact the media, so Mr Fletcher phones into a radio station, which Mrs Davidson and the kidnappers hear on the news. Bea passes a hint about the kidnappers location to Mr Fletcher, who works out where she must be and tells the police. Mr Douglas sacks Mr Fletcher, which leaves him free to go to the newspapers. Sgt. Ross takes Mr Fletcher with him when the police surround the beach house. Ricky tries to bluff her way out with the replica pistol and is shot and killed by the police. Linda tries to make a run for it, but she is overpowered, and Mrs Davidson is freed. Bea and Judy release Andrea. Meg goes to the boathouse, but Doreen and Peter have already left. Doreen and Peter break into Lizzie's house even though it is next door to Mrs Powell. Doreen and Peter let Lizzie know that they are there. Andrea is briefly upset by news of Ricky's death, but then sees it is publicity value to the "cause". Mr Fletcher hints that Bea and Judy should claim Andrea was in it with them and planned her own kidnapping. Bea informs Judy that Andrea took advantage of her by asking her to deliver the letter about Mrs Davidson. Doreen tells Lizzie says she is in love with Peter and is afraid to lose him if he finds out the police are not looking for him. Peter is listening behind the door.
| 233 | Episode 68 | Dave Worthington | Lex Van Os | 30 September 1981 |
Peter is not angry with Doreen. Bea remembers Officer Conway as a remand prisoner about twelve years previously, subsequently found not guilty. Mrs Powell overhears Lizzie talking to someone, Lizzie claims she is talking to Sid. Mrs Powell tells Meg, who challenges Lizzie about Doreen. Meg brings Doreen in. Peter promises to visit Doreen. Bea blames Doreen for the loss of the day centre project, deceiving Peter, breaking into Sid's house and putting Lizzie's parole at risk. Bea thinks it is not a good idea to make too much fuss for Lizzie's leaving, in case it encourages her to get back inside again. Linda Golman is facing twenty years in prison and blames Andrea. They fight and both are injured. Mrs Conway and Meg go with them to hospital. Judy accuses Bea of being more interested in the Braille machine than the prisoners' welfare: Bea says that she finally feels she has found something to do that is useful to others. In hospital, Linda tries to knock Mrs Conway out with her own gun. She chases after Andrea and threatens to shoot her. Meg tries to calm Linda down, while Mr Fletcher approaches. Andrea tries get away from Linda's grasp, and in the struggle a shot is fired.
| 234 | Episode 69 | Christine McCourt | Lex Van Os | 30 September 1981 |
Mr Fletcher is shot in the arm but he still manages to overpower Linda with a swift kick. Doreen and Judy suspect that the strange way Bea's been behaving recently has something to do with Officer Conway. Judy tries to sneak a look at Miss Conway's file, but almost gets caught. Jim tries unsuccessfully to persuade Meg to come back to work as a prison officer. Linda is sent to solitary and gets some advice from Mr Fletcher about prison life. Andrea is visited by Judy in sickbay, telling her she shouldn't expect any sympathy from the women. Doreen and Judy make up jokes about Officer Conway after seeing an ad for "Conway's Discounts" in a newspaper. Miss Conway wants to transfer but is asked by Mr Fletcher to give it a few more weeks. The discount shop turns out to belong to her brother, which the women didn't realise. She tries being friendlier to Doreen, but gets nowhere. Peter is doing well and promises to visit Doreen again. The braille machine is finally on its way. Mr Fletcher asks Miss Conway out for dinner. Lizzie is worried she won't be allowed to visit after her release. After a sleepless night, she thinks the women aren't going to miss her, but actually the women and the officers have arranged a surprise group goodbye in the laundry. She vows never to return.
| 235 | Episode 70 | Alastair Sharp | Rod Hardy | 6 October 1981 |
Meg gives Lizzie a lift to her new house and a house warming gift. She advises Lizzie to try to make new friends on the outside. Lizzie gets silent phone calls and the plants keep moving. Bea keeps Andrea and Linda apart in the dining room. Andrea fakes an assault to get Linda put back into solitary. With Bea working on the braille project, the women decide Judy and Doreen should split the operation of the press. Mrs Powell cracks the whip on the volume of work in the laundry. Doreen gets an extra 6 months added onto her sentence. New prisoners, Doctor Kate Peterson and Sandy Edwards arrive, both with murder convictions. Sandy has been to Barnhurst previously. She initially claims to be a different prisoner on arrival, confusing Miss Conway. The two newcomers share a cell. Kate tells Sandy her husband died in a crash, then she was forced to murder her boyfriend in defense of her son. Sandy thinks it is odd that topdog Bea did not come to check them out, having heard her reputation from Marie at Barnhurst. Mr Fletcher asks Kate to help out in the infirmary, but she refuses. Doreen has taken up drawing and Miss Conway encourages her to enter an art competition. Sandy challenges Judy and Doreen for operation of the press and topdog.
| 236 | Episode 71 | Bryon Williams | Rod Hardy | 7 October 1981 |
Sandy burns Judy with the press until she gives in. Bea won't get involved initially, but eventually grants Sandy the use of the press. Mr Fletcher offers to let Bea work on the Braille machine unsupervised. Bea has problems reading while working on the Braille machine. Kate introduces herself to Bea. Kate is worried that Linda needs psychiatric help and lets Mr Fletcher know. Linda refuses to see her father. Miss Conway tries to comfort her. Doreen and Sandy come to blows and Doreen wants to move back in with Judy. When Judy goes to her cell, she finds that Linda has hung herself over Andrea's bed. Judy panics, calls for help and begins to cry. Andrea is shocked to see Linda dead and runs away. Sandy bashes Andrea for her treatment of Linda. Andrea is moved to E block for her own safety. Kate and Sandy move into Bea's cell, while Doreen moves in with Judy. After one of Lizzie's nuisance calls, she hears a noise outside. There is a knock on the door, and Lizzie runs out into the garden. Someone grabs hold of her.
| 237 | Episode 72 | Denise Morgan | Greg Shears | 13 October 1981 |
...its only Meg. Lizzie tells Meg that she's scared. Meg goes inside to investigate and finds a cat, and a bottle of sherry which may explain things. Gordon visits Lizzie, and she tells him about what's been happening, but when he leaves he tinkers with the fuse box outside. Meg returns, discovering the problem with the fuse. Doreen isn't happy to be in the cell where Linda hanged herself and wants Judy to swap beds with her. Kate and Sandy manage to break the kettle, but Bea isn't feeling well, and lets it go by. She doesn't intervene when Sandy is bashed by Judy and Doreen. The TV is damaged in the fight. Miss Conway says she can get a new TV from her brother. Mr Fletcher arranges another date with Miss Conway. Judy and Doreen put together a gang to challenge Sandy. Kate sees that Bea has a headache, for which Bea gets tablets from the infirmary. Kate is bashed by Judy, Doreen and Hazel, turning her to Sandy's side.
| 238 | Episode 73 | Margaret McClusky | Greg Shears | 14 October 1981 |
Judy is worried that Hazel might have hit Kate too hard and asks Doreen to go and find out how she is. Meg overhears Sandy threatening Doreen. Meg asks Miss Conway if the TV hire company is run by someone related to her. Judy finally agrees she will have to take over as top dog, but she and Doreen struggle to get followers. Mr Fletcher asks Meg again to come back to work as an officer. Meg agrees to come back to Wentworth after she has been to Linda's funeral. Meg tells Miss Conway not to keep her minor criminal past from Mr Fletcher, but when she tries to discuss it, they end up kissing. Kate asks Mr Fletcher for medical books. Gordon visits Lizzie again, but when he asks about the moving plants, Lizzie remembers that she's never mentioned the plants to him and accuses him of trying to frighten her, just as Mrs Powell turns up, but all she sees is an argument, which she reports back to Meg. Lizzie visits Bea and tells her about Gordon, but Bea acts exhausted and confused, which upsets Lizzie and she leaves. Gordon admits to Lizzie that he was behind the campaign of terror, but if she tries to tell anyone they will just think she is mad and will have to move out of the house anyway. Lizzie is angry and makes Gordon leave. Kate tries to persuade Bea to see a doctor. Bea claims that she already knows she has cancer.
| 239 | Episode 74 | Coral Drouyn | Leigh Spence | 20 October 1981 |
Meg comes back to work as a prison officer. Mrs Powell is not happy to see her. Sandy finds out Bea is seriously ill. Kate asks Judy to make sure that Bea makes an appointment to see a doctor. Miss Conway tries to persuade Doreen to do a correspondence course. Mrs Powell carries out a cell search when her pocket book goes missing, taking something from Sandy's locker, but the pocket book is found in the staff room by Meg. Mr Fletcher stays overnight at Miss Conway's place. Mrs Davidson returns, full of praise for Mr Fletcher, and is happy to find he is no longer resigning. She does, however, let slip that Miss Conway had been an inmate. Sandy deliberately burns herself on the press in order to see the nurse, while Hazel causes a distraction to allow Sandy to steal some painkillers, tucked under her bandages. Doreen gives Lizzie advice on how to deal with Gordon. Lizzie rings Gordon and tells him that she has come up with a solution. She then pours kerosene over the furniture and sets it alight.
| 240 | Episode 75 | Ian Bradley | Leigh Spence | 21 October 1981 |
Lizzie's house has burnt down and she has vanished, later turning up at Meg's house. Sandy manages to give Bea the painkilling tablets with Kate's help. Bea is convinced that she has a brain tumour just like her mother did. Bea unexpectedly takes Sandy's side in a disagreement with Doreen, it seems she is setting Sandy up as the next top dog. Bea collapses in the dining room. Mrs Powell thinks she's faking, infuriating the women who threaten to riot. Mrs Davidson is concerned that Mrs Powell is unsuitable to be acting Deputy Governor in Mr Fletcher's absence. Kate tells Bea that her headaches are due to her kidneys not working properly and she needs tests. Mr Fletcher confronts Miss Conway about her past, getting his own back by turning down a holiday request. The police come to Meg's house to interview Lizzie about the fire. Bea is reassured that she doesn't have a brain tumour, but the doctor tells Mrs Davidson that Bea may need a kidney transplant.
| 241 | Episode 76 | Ray Kolle | Lex Van Os | 27 October 1981 |
Mrs Powell accuses Meg of putting her in a bad light with Mrs Davidson. Both are asked to apply for the senior officer's post. The Braille machine is being moved to Barnhurst. Doreen has got an honourable mention for one of her drawings. Judy's daughter Lori has got engaged. Judy is pleased, but writes to Lori to tell her not to let her fiance know about her criminal mother. The women find out Lizzie's house has burned down, she is now staying with Meg, that is, until she returns to Wentworth, charged with arson. Bea tells Lizzie that Sandy is now top dog. Judy steals a letter written by Colleen, which is severely critical of the management and staff of Wentworth. Kate's mother and son visit, Kate does not seem affectionate to her son. It appears Kate may actually have murdered her husband when he found out about her affair. Kate loses control for a moment, but calms down enough to give Lizzie a satisfactory (but not entirely truthful) explanation.
| 242 | Episode 77 | Wendy Jackson | Lex Van Os | 28 October 1981 |
A police officer comes to talk to Mrs Powell. Miss Conway and Meg go out for a night on the town. Bob is in Indonesia for six months. A couple of men try to chat up Meg and Miss Conway. Meg attempts to get rid of them by telling them where they work, to no effect. A big hefty bloke comes into the pub - Meg claims he is her husband and that he'll be very angry, which does the trick. Sandy tells the other prisoners that if there is anyone who can donate a kidney for Bea, they will get certain advantages from it. Mrs Powell tells Lizzie that she saw her with the flask of kerosene. Lizzie tells Judy, Doreen and Sandy that she set the house on fire to stop Gordon getting hold of it. Sandy suggests sending Mrs Powell's letter to the newspaper, keeping the original safe. Sandy puts pressure on Mrs Powell to "forget" that she saw Lizzie, using the letter as leverage. Mrs Davidson is furious with the anonymous letter writer when the paper publishes it. Kate hints to Mrs Davidson that it came from one of the officers, then confides it was Mrs Powell. Mrs Davidson offers to transfer her to infirmary work. Doreen's competition picture shows Mr Fletcher and Miss Conway in a "compromising position", infuriating Miss Conway. Doreen is told by the doctor that she could choose to donate a kidney to Bea,
| 243 | Episode 78 | Michael Freundt & Andrew Kennedy | Kendal Flanagan | 3 November 1981 |
Mr Fletcher returns to work after a holiday. He's just as angry about Doreen's drawing as Miss Conway, blaming her for encouraging Doreen. Two new officers are being deployed to put in place new stricter security measures. Doreen is scared to donate a kidney, she asks Kate for advice, who then accidentally tells the other women that Doreen is a match. Bea tells Doreen they will still be friends, even if she decides not to donate the kidney. Lizzie tricks Mrs O'Reagan in the kitchen into signing a requisition, which she hides among other orders. Lizzie gives Kate a doll that she has made to give to her son, but Kate hands it off to Sister Franklin. When Bea finds out that Sister Franklin has got Lizzie's doll, Kate says her son has lots of toys already and Sister Franklin's kids will appreciate it more. Doreen has decided to have the operation to donate a kidney to Bea. Kate's lawyer has found some major discrepancies in her accounts. Mrs Powell tries to force Sandy to tell her where the letter is hidden, but Sandy just laughs at her.
| 244 | Episode 79 | Barbara Ramsay | Kendal Flanagan | 4 November 1981 |
Mrs Powell is annoyed that Meg insists on following the two officer protocol for a cell search. Sandy gets a visit from her "lawyer", John Fitzwater, who works for McNally. He wants Sandy to recruit women to work as prostitutes on their release. Sandy asks for him to arrange for "extra washing" along with the normal deliveries. Meg's ID badge is missing. She finds Mrs Powell searching Sandy's cell by herself. Mrs Powell finds the ID badge on the floor, pocketing it to return later in front of Mrs Davidson. Lizzie collects the "extra" orders from the kitchen, including yeast so that she can make home brew. Miss Conway discovers Lizzie's stash of cigarettes. The prisoners get new uniforms. Doreen is getting nervous about the operation and tells the women it has been called off. Mrs Davidson is unable to convince Sandy to get the women to follow the new rules. Kate sees where Sandy has hidden Mrs Powell's letter, using the promise of the information to blackmail Mrs Powell into arranging a visit from Inspector Grace. Sandy finds the letter has gone. The first delivery of extra laundry arrives, with money hidden among it. Kate offers to be a informer for Inspector Grace.
| 245 | Episode 80 | Rick Maier | Juliana Focht | 10 November 1981 |
Kate wants a witness "found" for her appeal in exchange for information, telling him where Megan Barnett's body is buried. Grace agrees to work with her, but also starts investigating Kate. Lizzie's solicitor arrives and informs her that the prosecution's chief witness is Mrs Powell, who saw her with a bottle of kerosene. Lizzie is not worried, but then Sandy tells her the letter is gone. Sandy writes a note to Fitzwater, asking for keys to be smuggled in. Doreen forges Mr Fletcher's signature on fake rosters and Judy types them up in reception. Mrs Powell is angry with Lizzie: Kate steps in, impressing the women, deliberately earning a spell in solitary to look good. Doreen tells Bea she can't go through with the kidney donation, sobbing in the laundry. Kate feeds Mrs Powell about the women's illicit activities in exchange for books and a radio in solitary. Sandy implies there may be more copies of the letter. Kate tells Mrs Powell that it is most likely not true. Mrs Powell thinks the posted roster looks strange, but shrugs and leaves. Mrs Davidson doesn't understand why no one's reported for work. Meg takes Officer Steve Fawkner for a tour of the prison. Meanwhile, Miss Conway has brought breakfast in bed for Mr Fletcher - he asks why she's not at work, she cites the roster, but he disagrees. Mrs Davidson calls to ask why she's not at work, so she rushes to leave. Officer Fawkner causes a commotion with the women. Sandy gets a note from Fitzwater, which she burns, and a set of keys. She then uses a key to open the security gates, and start a small fire in a locker. Judy switches the fake roster back to the original. The fire alarm goes off during Ted Douglas's meeting with Mrs Davidson. The fire is extinguished, but Ted mysteriously decides having Marie Winter transferred from Barnhurst would calm things down. Marie Winter takes no stick from Miss Conway on induction, impressing Judy. She wastes no time in finding out Sandy is top dog. A kidney has been found for Bea. On her way to the hospital, Bea spots Marie, having no idea why she's there.
| 246 | Episode 81 | Dave Worthington | Juliana Focht | 11 November 1981 |
Doreen tells Judy about how bad life was at Wentworth under Marie's rule before Bea took over, as Marie listens in. Miss Conway finds the fake roster in the waste bin. Judy and Doreen are expecting loss of privileges, but are shocked to find they are being immediately transferred to Barnhurst, with only a little time to say goodbyes. Marie gives them the news about Bea's new kidney before they go. Mrs Powell is appointed Chief Prison Officer, much to Meg's disappointment, and Mrs Davidson's concern. The rec room is closed as now all of their recreation time must be spent in their cells. Meg expresses her concerns about the tighter security and is unanimously elected as union rep. Meg immediately warns of possible riots if things aren't relaxed. Following Kate's tip, Mrs Powell catches Lizzie with contraband and transfers her to D Block. Bea's kidney transplant is a success. Sandy agrees to a riot although she thinks there is a lagger, Marie starts making weapons, Hazel is sent with a key to get petrol to store in Judy and Doreen's empty cell, narrowly avoiding being caught. Kate offers to man the infirmary in case of any injuries as a way of staying out of the riot. Mr Fawkner tells Miss Conway about his dreams of buying a boat. Mr Fletcher and Meg are on their last patrol of the night, when Sandy screams the riot is on. Mr Fletcher runs for it, while Meg stands frozen before the rampaging prisoners.

== Accolades ==
- Logie Award for Best Lead Actress in a series – Val Lehman (1982)
- Logie Award for Most Popular Actress – Val Lehman (1982)
- Logie Award for Most Popular Drama Series – Prisoner (1982)

== Home media ==
The following is a list of DVD sets which contain individual episodes from season three or the complete season as a whole.

| Title | Episode(s) | Release date | Format | Country | Rating | Ref. |
|---|---|---|---|---|---|---|
| Prisoner (Note: All content is identical in Australia, UK and U.S. aside from different cover art. The set was released as "Prisoner: Cell Block H" in the UK and as "25th Anniversary Collector's Edition" in the U.S. Re-released in UK with new packaging on 21 October 2013, while the same re-packeged set was released in Australia.) | 166 | 18 February 2002 | VHS & DVD | AUS | ACB: M | |
| Prisoner | 166 | 22 September 2003 | DVD | UK | BBFC: 15 | |
| Prisoner | 166 | 30 November 2004 | DVD | USA | NR | |
| Volume 11 | 166–176 (Note: Contains the remaining 5 episodes of season 2 (161–165).) | 18 August 2007 | DVD | AUS | ACB: M | |
| Volume 12 | 177–192 | 20 August 2007 | DVD | AUS | ACB: M | |
| The Complete Collection | 166–246 | 29 September 2007 (Note: "The Complete Collection" was made available in Australia before the remaining 28 volumes had been released. The set was re-released on 5 October 2011.) | DVD | AUS | ACB: M | |
| Volume 13 | 193–208 | 20 October 2007 | DVD | AUS | ACB: M | |
| Volume 14 (Note: Released as "The Vera Bennett Edition" in Australia.) | 209–224 | 20 October 2007 | DVD | AUS | ACB: M | |
| Volume 15 | 225–240 | 3 November 2007 | DVD | AUS | ACB: M | |
| Volume 16 | 241–246 (Note: Contains the first 10 episodes of Season 4 (247–256).) | 3 November 2007 | DVD | AUS | ACB: M | |
| Volume 6 | 166–192 (Note: Contains the remaining 5 episodes of Season 2 (161–165). An identical set was released in Australia on 1 February 2012 when their original releases went out-of-print.) | 21 February 2011 | DVD | UK | BBFC: 15 | |
| Volume 7 | 193–224 (Note: An identical set was released in Australia on 7 May 2012.) | 18 April 2011 | DVD | UK | BBFC: 15 | |
| Volume 8 | 225–246 (Note: Contains the first 10 episodes of Season 4 (247–256). An idential set was released in Australia on 4 July 2012.) | 27 June 2011 | DVD | UK | BBFC: 15 | |
| The Complete Season Three | 166–246 | 8 February 2017 | DVD | AUS | ACB: M | |
