= Prisoner season 1 =

Prisoner
- Season 1
- DVD cover
- Starring: Patsy King; Fiona Spence; Peta Toppano; Kerry Armstrong; Val Lehman; Carol Burns; Elspeth Ballantyne; Colette Mann; Sheila Florance
- No. of episodes: 79

Release
- Original network: Network Ten (0-10 Network)
- Original release: 27 February – 28 November 1979

Season chronology
- Next → Season 2

The first season of Australian drama television series Prisoner (commonly known as Prisoner: Cell Block H) premiered on the then-known 0-10 Network on 26 February 1979 in Sydney and 27 February 1979 in Melbourne. The season contains 79 episodes and concluded on 28 November 1979.

== Cast ==
=== Main ===
- Patsy King as Erica Davidson
- Fiona Spence as Vera Bennett
- Peta Toppano as Karen Travers
- Kerry Armstrong as Lynn Warner
- Val Lehman as Bea Smith
- Carol Burns as Franky Doyle
- Elspeth Ballantyne as Meg Jackson
- Colette Mann as Doreen Anderson
- Sheila Florance as Lizzy Birdsworth
- Margaret Laurence as Marilyn Mason
- Mary Ward as Jeanette "Mum" Brooks (Note: "Mum" Brooks was a regular character within the first sixteen episodes of the season. She returned as a recurring character from episodes 30–33 and again from episodes 61–67.)
- Barry Quin as Greg Miller
- Richard Moir as Eddie Cook
- Don Barker as Bill Jackson
- Christine Amor as Jean Vernon
- Jim Smillie as Steve Wilson
- Lesley Baker as Monica Ferguson (Note: Monica Ferguson first appeared in episode 15 as a recurring character; from episode 39 she became a regular character.)
- Gerard Maguire as Jim Fletcher (Note: Jim Fletcher was first credited in episode 39, although he did not make his first appearance until episode 40.)

=== Central supporting ===
- Amanda Muggleton as Chrissie Latham (Note: Chrissie Latham originally appeared in episodes 3 & 4 as a guest character and later returned from episode 65 as the character was written back into the series by popular demand.)
- Sigrid Thornton as Roslyn Coulson
- Monica Maughan as Pat O'Connell

=== Recurring ===
- Ronald Korosy as Marty Jackson
- Kirsty Child as Anne Yates
- Arianthe Galani as Mrs Bentley
- Anne Charleston/Gabrielle Hartley as Lorraine Watkins
- Billie Hammerberg as Valerie Richards
- Ann-Maree McDonald as Rosie Hudson
- Kim Deacon as Judith-Ann Watkins
- Louisa Pajo as Helen Masters
- Brandon Smith as James Brandon
- Frank Gallacher as Mr Bentley
- John Arnold as Doug Parker
- Terry Gill as Detective Inspector Jack Grace
- Beverly Dunn as Ethel Warner
- Ben Gabriel as Ted Warner
- Carmel Millhouse as Mary Healy/McCauley
- Patricia Kennedy as Miss McBride
- Sally Cahill as Barbara Davidson
- Margo McLennan as Catherine Roberts
- Tim Elliott as Ken Roberts
- Andrea Butcher as Sarah Roberts
- Penelope Stewart as Kathleen Leach
- Briony Behets as Susan Rice
- Bill Hunter as George Lucas
- David Bradshaw as Jason Richards/Frederick Rice
- Bryon Williams as Dr. Weissman
- Betty Lucas as Clara Goddard
- Joy Westmore as Joyce Barry
- Jude Kuring as Noeline Bourke
- Brian Granrott as Col Bourke
- Tracey-Jo Riley as Leanne Bourke
- Joanne Lehman as Yvonne
- Deborra-Lee Furness as Connie
- Maria Mercedes as Irene Zervos
- Lakis Kanzipas as Alex Zervos
- Nadia Tass as Tessa Zervos
- Theo Tsalkitzakos as Stavros
- Judy Nunn as Joyce Martin
- Terry Emery as Vince
- Peter Finlay as Mac
- Judith Woodroffe as Julie Barker
- Penny Ramsay as Leila Fletcher
- Gary Files as Fred Ferguson
- Lynda Keane as Denise Crabtree ("Blossom")
- Kate Jason as Martha Eaves
- Carrillo Gantner as Peter Clements
- Colleen Clifford as Edith Wharton
- Lulu Pinkus as Melinda Cross
- Hu Pryce as Tom Burton
- Judith McGrath as Colleen Powell
- Reylene Pearce as Phyllis Hunt
- Judith Roberts as Carol Burton
- Liddy Clark as Bella Albrecht
- Robin Cuming as Jack Crosse
- Burt Cooper as Terry Mansini
- Pat Bishop as Antonia McNally
- Roz French as Glenys Buchanan
- Jeanie Drynan as Angela Jeffries
- Ian Smith as Ted Douglas
- Anne Haddy as Alice Hemmings
- David Letch as David O'Connell
- Rosie Sturgess as Mrs. Devlin
- Geoff Collins as Alex Fraser
- George Spartels as Herbie
- Ray Meagher as Geoff Butler

== Episodes ==
No. overall	Episode	Directed by	Written by	Original release date
1	Episode 1 Episode 2	Graeme Arthur	Reg Watson	27 February 1979
2	Episode 1 Episode 2	Graeme Arthur	Reg Watson	27 February 1979
Two new prisoners arrive at Wentworth Detention Centre; Karen Travers, convicted of murdering her abusive husband and Lynn Warner, convicted of burying a baby alive, but she claims she is innocent. Bea enjoys 24 hours of freedom: she visits her daughter's grave, then shoots her husband dead.
3	Episode 3	Rod Hardy	Ian Bradley	28 February 1979
Bee surrenders and is put back inside, to face off against Franky Doyle. Bill Jackson is stabbed.
4	Episode 4	Graeme Arthur	Ian Bradley	6 March 1979
The murderer of Meg's husband is forced to confess.
5	Episode 5	Rod Hardy	Reg Watson	7 March 1979
6	Episode 6	Graeme Arthur	Denise Morgan	13 March 1979
7	Episode 7	Gary Conway	Denise Morgan	14 March 1979
Vera's mother dies.
8	Episode 8	Brian McDuffie	Ian Coughlan	20 March 1979
9	Episode 9	Gary Conway	Ian Bradley	21 March 1979
10	Episode 10	Graeme Arthur	Ian Coughlan	27 March 1979
Bea's plan to help Marilyn reconcile with Eddie backfires. Lynn struggles with life at home. A depressed Vera is almost arrested when she gets drunk and becomes aggressive in a bar. Helen is released and the prisoners discover what she really thinks of them when she appears in a TV interview.
11	Episode 11	Gary Conway	Denise Morgan	28 March 1979
Franky goes berserk when she learns her brother is critically injured.
12	Episode 12	Brian McDuffie	Michael Brindley	3 April 1979
Lynn marries Doug. Franky, Doreen and Lizzy escape.
13	Episode 13	Godfrey Philipp	Michael Brindley	4 April 1979
14	Episode 14	Godfrey Philipp	Michael Brindley	10 April 1979
15	Episode 15	Gary Conway	Denise Morgan	11 April 1979
16	Episode 16	Gary Conway	Marcus Cole	17 April 1979
17	Episode 17	Simon Wincer	Dave Worthington & Marcus Cole	18 April 1979
18	Episode 18	Simon Wincer	Denise Morgan	24 April 1979
19	Episode 19	William Fitzwater	Jill Kavalek	25 April 1979
Catherine Roberts drives her car backwards and forwards over the man that raped her daughter.
20	Episode 20	William Fitzwater	Denise Morgan	1 May 1979
Franky is shot dead by police. Doreen hands herself in to pay Karen back, accusing her of getting Franky killed.
21	Episode 21	Marcus Cole & Charles Tingwell	Marcus Cole	2 May 1979
22	Episode 22	Marcus Cole & Charles Tingwell	Michael Brindley	8 May 1979
23	Episode 23	Julian Pringle	Maree Teychenne	9 May 1979
24	Episode 24	Julian Pringle	Ron McLean	15 May 1979
25	Episode 25	Alan Coleman	Stanley Walsh	16 May 1979
26	Episode 26	Alan Coleman	Sarah Darling	22 May 1979
27	Episode 27	William Fitzwater	Denise Morgan	23 May 1979
28	Episode 28	William Fitzwater	Dave Worthington & Ian Bradley	29 May 1979
29	Episode 29	Marcus Cole	Michael Brindley	30 May 1979
30	Episode 30	Marcus Cole	Sheila Sibley	5 June 1979
31	Episode 31	Julian Pringle	Denise Morgan	6 June 1979
32	Episode 32	Julian Pringle	John Drew	12 June 1979
George Lucas ties Vera up before running off with her bail money.
33	Episode 33	Peita Letchford	Ray Kolle	12 June 1979
Vera is found by Erica who is less than happy with her involvement with George Lucas. The women get bored of Monica and want Bea back, unbeknown to them that the police are already on her trail.
34	Episode 34	Peita Letchford	Sheila Sibley	19 June 1979
Bea and Val have a night out resulting in a very bad hangover the following morning. Lizzie is forced by Monica to make some of her famous brew but Noeline tries to muscle in on the production line. Noeline's brother makes a big mistake during a burglary.
35	Episode 35	Leigh Spence	Michael Brindley	20 June 1979
Clara throws a party for the other women and manages to make even more booze, but Noeline drinks the lot. Bea is concerned about the young girl who lives next door. Noeline's brother is shot dead by police when his burglary goes wrong.
36	Episode 36	Leigh Spence	Denise Morgan	26 June 1979
Bea's time is up on the outside and she's returned to Wentworth where she takes over as Top Dog, much to the dismay of Noeline and Monica. Meg is injured when Bea and Monica fight in the laundry over who is working the steam press.
37	Episode 37	Marcus Cole	John Drew	27 June 1979
Business woman Marianne de Vere has been persuaded to fund the Half Way House project so a celebration barbecue is organised for the prisoners. She also arranges a new colour television for the Recroom but Noeline ensures that nobody will watch it.
38	Episode 38	Marcus Cole	Sheila Sibley	3 July 1979
39	Episode 39	Brian Faull	Ron McLean	4 July 1979
40	Episode 40	Brian Faull	Denise Morgan	10 July 1979
Jim Fletcher makes his debut, and is greeted by some crass political correctness.
41	Episode 41	Leon Thau	John Hepworth	11 July 1979
42	Episode 42	Leon Thau	Maree Teychenne	17 July 1979
43	Episode 43	Leigh Spence	Denise Morgan	18 July 1979
44	Episode 44	Leigh Spence	Dave Worthington & Ian Bradley	24 July 1979
45	Episode 45	Marcus Cole	Michael Brindley	25 July 1979
46	Episode 46	Marcus Cole	John Drew	31 July 1979
47	Episode 47	Philip East	John Upton	1 August 1979
48	Episode 48	Philip East	S. E. Unsworth	7 August 1979
49	Episode 49	Leon Thau & Philip East	Denise Morgan	8 August 1979
50	Episode 50	Leon Thau & Philip East	John Wood	14 August 1979
51	Episode 51	Leigh Spence	John Upton	15 August 1979
52	Episode 52	Leigh Spence	Sheila Sibley	21 August 1979
Bella Albredcht is murdered.
53	Episode 53	Marcus Cole	Ray Kolle	22 August 1979
54	Episode 54	Marcus Cole	Denise Morgan	28 August 1979
55	Episode 55	Simon Hellings	Margaret McClusky	29 August 1979
56	Episode 56	Simon Hellings	Anne Lucas & John Wregg	4 September 1979
57	Episode 57	Philip East	John Wood	5 September 1979
58	Episode 58	Philip East	Dave Worthington	11 September 1979
59	Episode 59	Leigh Spence	Denise Morgan	12 September 1979
60	Episode 60	Leigh Spence	Michael Brindley	18 September 1979
61	Episode 61	Marcus Cole	Ian Bradley & Anne Lucas	19 September 1979
62	Episode 62	Marcus Cole	Margaret McClusky	25 September 1979
63	Episode 63	Leon Thau	Denise Morgan	26 September 1979
Ros shoots Toni McNally after the court dismisses the charges against her, after a key witness is terrified into giving a false account.
64	Episode 64	Leon Thau	Sheila Sibley	2 October 1979
Toni McNally dies in hospital, meaning Ros Coulson will be charged with her murder.
65	Episode 65	Philip East	John Upton	3 October 1979
Chrissie Latham is brought back to Wentworth, to Meg's horror.
66	Episode 66	Simon Hellings	Dave Worthington	16 October 1979
67	Episode 67	Leigh Spence	Denise Morgan	17 October 1979
68	Episode 68	Leigh Spence	Ray Kolle	23 October 1979
69	Episode 69	Marcus Cole	John Wood	24 October 1979
Greg reveals the results of Chrissie's pregnancy test. Also, Pat's son visit Wentworth in the working party, but Vera catches them talking, putting Pat's release in jeopardy.
70	Episode 70	Marcus Cole	John Wregg & Eric Scott	30 October 1979
Rosie prepares for baby Sam's first birthday, oblivious to the fact he will be taken from her when he reaches a year old. Doreen is released to the halfway house and spends an afternoon with Alice.
71	Episode 71	Leigh Spence	Margaret McClusky	31 October 1979
Psychiatrist Dr Weissman is called in to assess how Rosie is coping with the impending loss of her son, Sam. Vera offers Rosie some last minute advice.
72	Episode 72	Leigh Spence	Denise Morgan	6 November 1979
Doreen tries to come to terms with the realisation that Alice is her long lost mother. On the inside, Bea keeps an eye on the recently sentenced Ros. It's Vera's birthday and she throws herself a party.
73	Episode 73	Philip East	Sheila Sibley	7 November 1979
Karen tries to turn Ros away when she turns up at the halfway house but is persuaded to let her stay one night. However, it's not long before the police are knocking on the halfway house door.
74	Episode 74	Philip East	Ray Kolle	13 November 1979
With Christmas approaching, Lizzie suggests the prisoners write their annual Christmas play, so the women use the chance to ridicule the officers. A reporter takes an interest in Ros' escape story.
75	Episode 75	Kelvin Fogarty	Denise Morgan	14 November 1979
It's Christmas and the women are preparing for their play. Erica is furious following the publishing of a newspaper article on Pat, and tells Greg to choose between the prison and the halfway house.
76	Episode 76	Kelvin Fogarty	John Wood	20 November 1979
Lizzie is still upset, convinced Vera stole her Christmas cake. Pat's house is swarmed with police and reporters, all looking for her son David since his prison escape, but he can't stay away from her.
77	Episode 77	Marcus Cole	John Wregg & Ian Bradley	21 November 1979
Chrissie helps Ros break into Greg's surgery, where she manages to steal some pills. Following the shootout, Pat is arrested and sent back to Wentworth.
78	Episode 78	Marcus Cole	Margaret McClusky	27 November 1979
Security is increased inside the prison. Bea blames Ros, and plans to tell her when Ros is out solitary. Greg and Karen announce their engagement, oblivious to David's plans to end Greg's life.
79	Episode 79	Leigh Spence	Michael Harvey	28 November 1979
Karen is rushed to hospital, where she remains in a serious condition. Political activists Janet Dominguez arrives at Wentworth and is immediately put in solitary confinement.

== Reception ==
=== Viewership ===
In 1979, Prisoner was the second most popular program in Australia, averaging at 1,494,000 viewers.

=== Accolades ===
- Penguin Award for Best Sustained Actress in a series – Carol Burns (1979)
- Logie Award for Best Lead Actress in a Series – Carol Burns (1980)
- Logie Award for Best New Drama Series – Prisoner (1980)

== Home media ==
Select episodes from season one are available on both VHS and DVD formats.

Season one availabity
Title	Episodes	Release date	Format	Country	Rating (Note: All episodes from the UK VHS sets have been re-rated 12 for the DVD releases for violence, language, drug references, nudity, and sexual references and sexual threat)	Ref.
Episodes 1 & 2		1993	VHS	UK	BBFC: 15	
Episodes 3 & 4		1993	VHS	UK	BBFC: PG	
Episodes 5 & 6		1993	VHS	UK	BBFC: PG	
Episodes 7 & 8		1 February 1994	VHS	UK	BBFC: 15	
Episodes 9 & 10		15 August 1994	VHS	UK	BBFC: PG	
Episodes 11 & 12		7 November 1994	VHS	UK	BBFC: PG	
Prisoner: 2 (Note: Content identical in both Australia and the U.S. aside from different cover art. Released in the U.S. as "Set 2".)	1–4	24 February 2003	VHS & DVD	AUS	ACB: M	
Prisoner: 2	1–4	19 December 2006	DVD	US	NR	
Volume 1	1–16	19 October 2006	DVD	AUS	ACB: M	
Volume 2	17–32	19 October 2006	DVD	AUS	ACB: M	
Volume 3	33–48	20 November 2006	DVD	AUS	ACB: M	
Volume 4	49–64	20 November 2006	DVD	AUS	ACB: M	
Volume 5	65–79 (Note: Also contains the first episode of season 2.)	17 March 2007	DVD	AUS	ACB: M	
The Complete Collection	1–79 (Note: The entire series contains all eight seasons and 692 episodes.)	29 September 2007	DVD	AUS	ACB: M	
Volume 1	1–32	10 November 2008	DVD	UK	BBFC: 15	
Volume 2	33–64	1 June 2009	DVD	UK	BBFC: 15	
Volume 3	65–79 (Note: Also contains the first 17 episodes of season 2.)	12 October 2009	DVD	UK	BBFC: 12	
Volume 1–3	1–79 (Note: Contains the complete season one and the first 17 episodes of season 2.)	30 November 2009	DVD	UK	BBFC: 15	
Volume 1 (Note: Re-released sets in UK-style packaging.)	1–32	9 March 2011	DVD	AUS	ACB: M	
Volume 2	1–64	9 March 2011	DVD	AUS	ACB: M	
Volume 3	65–79	11 May 2011	DVD	AUS	ACB: M	
The Complete Collection (Note: Re-release of the 2007 set.)	1–79	5 October 2011	DVD	AUS	ACB: M	
The Complete Season One	1–79	2 November 2016	DVD	AUS	ACB: M	

=== Streaming ===
Prisoner began streaming on Network 10's service, 10Play from 1 January 2022. The complete first season is currently available to stream.

The series began streaming in the UK on Channel 5's service My5 on 1 September 2023, the first UK broadcast for 22 years. It reached the season finale (episode 79) on 20 October 2023. It also became available to stream on Pluto TV in November 2023. The first season also began broadcasting on TV, with 5Select from 20 December 2023, followed by That's TV 2 on 3 January 2024.
