= Jentah Sobott =

Australian actress

- Occupation: Actress
- Years active: 1982–2019
- Known for: Prisoner

Jentah Sobott is an Australian actress, best known for her recurring role in the cult television drama Prisoner as Heather "Mouse" Trapp. Sobott worked in theatre, before being given a role in Prisoner initially as an extra in two different roles, before becoming a regular cast member. She has also appeared in Australian film.

== Filmography ==
Year	Title	Role	Notes
1982	Duet for Four	Unemployed young woman	
1984	My First Wife	Nurse	
1979–1982	Prisoner	Dwyer, White, Heather "Mouse" Trapp	63 episodes
2000	SeaChange	Carol Stephens	Episode:"Love in the Time of Coleridge"
2019	Neighbours	Chrissie Reynolds	Prisoner cast reunion, with Betty Bobbitt, Jane Clifton and Jenny Lovell
