= Reylene Pearce =

Australian actress

- Born: Australia
- Occupation: Actress
- Known for: Prisoner

Reylene Pearce briefly billed as Raelene Pearce and Rey Pearce, is an Australian actress, best known for her long-running role in the television drama series Prisoner as Phyllis Hunt.

She appeared in the show for 141 episodes from 1979 to 1984, during which time the role had developed from a background bit part to a central character.

Post Prisoner she had several guest roles in TV series Neighbours and regularly appeared in Timothy Spanos's films and limited series including a leading role in Celebrity House Cleaner, and as Nola Skinner in the film Boronia Boys and the spin off Boronia Backpackers. She played a chocolate addicted police informer called Chocky in the comedy series Sizzler '77.

In 2021, Pearce gave an extensive interview with Prisoner (TV series) podcast Talking Prisoner and spoke on her time on the show.

== Filmography ==
Year	Title	Role	Notes
1979–1984	Prisoner (known internationally in the UK and USA as Prisoner: Cell Block H and Caged Women in Canada)	Phyllis Hunt (recurring, regular)	141 episodes
1984	Special Squad (TV series)	Mrs Foster	Guest role billed as Rey Pearce
1985–1991	Neighbours (TV series)	Mrs . Woodhouse – Receptionist – Yvonne Beckitt	Guest roles billed as Raelene Pearce
2003	Prisoner Queen:Mindless Music & Mirrorballs	Top Dog	Film
2011	Boronia Boys	Nola	Film
2011	Boronia Backpackers	Nola Skinner	4 episodes
2023	Celebrity House Cleaner	Lizzie	4 episodes
2023	Sizzler '77	Chocky	3 episodes
2023	Mondo Maniacs	Deliah	2 episodes
