= Joy Westmore =

Australian actress (1932–2020)

- Joy Westmore as Officer Joyce Barry in Prisoner: Cell Block H
- Born: Joy Grisold; 1932; Melbourne, Australia
- Died: 5 November 2020 (aged 88); Melbourne, Australia
- Occupations: Actress (radio, stage, television), voice-over artist
- Years active: 1950–2013
- Known for: Prisoner also known as Prisoner Cell Block H aka Caged Women – Officer Barry/Joyce Pringle
- Notable work: The Sentimental Bloke; Neighbours; Blue Heelers; Cluedo

Joy Westmore (née Grisold; 1932 – 5 November 2020) was an Australian actress on radio, stage and television, and in voice-over. She was best known to local and international television viewers for her long-running role in Prisoner as the friendly but highly ineffectual bespectacled officer Joyce Barry, appearing from the first season in 1979 until the final episode in 1986 and smaller roles in Neighbours in 1991 and 2003.

== Career ==
Westmore had been an actress since 1950. She read commercials on radio and was particularly known for her performances opposite Barry Humphries's alter ego Dame Edna Everage. She also appeared in early television comedy sketches with Graham Kennedy and Ernie Sigley. She made her small-screen debut in the TV movie The Sentimental Bloke, and subsequently had roles in the soap The Sullivans and in Bellbird, before taking on the longer-lasting role of Officer Joyce Barry in Prisoner. She was a recurring cast member throughout the first five years of the show, but became a regular in 1984 and continued until the series' finale in 1986. Entertainment reporter Peter Ford stated that "Joyce Barry was probably the world's worst prison officer, because she was too overly nice and trustworthy, although she provided a lot of comic relief in the series".

After Prisoner she played Mrs Blanche White in an Australian version of the TV game show Cluedo, and had two brief roles in Neighbours, as Mrs Forster in 1991 and as Dee Bliss's grandmother, Nancy Bliss, in 2003. She also played various small roles in one-off and long-running dramas, including Waiting at the Royal, Fergus McPhail and Blue Heelers.

She also was narrator in audio books.

== Personal life and death ==
Westmore was married to dentist Brian Westmore on 13 March 1960. They had four children together.

Joy Westmore died from dementia in an aged care facility in Melbourne, on 5 November 2020, aged 88.

== Filmography ==
Film
Year	Title	Role	Notes
1977	Summerfield	Mrs. Shields	Feature film
1979	The Odd Angry Shot	Bill's Mum	Feature film
1980	Nightmares	Matron	aka 'Stage Fright' Feature film
1983	A Slice of Life	Receptionist No. 1	Feature film
1984	Annie's Coming Out	Receptionist	aka 'A Test of Love' Feature film
1985	The More Things Change...	Mrs. Degan	Feature film
1987	Les Patterson Saves the World	Lady Gwen Patterson	Feature film
2011	The Op Shop	Claudia	Film short
2012	Echo	Mother	Film short

Television
Year	Title	Role	Notes
1959	Press Gang	Unnamed/unknown role (Joy Grisold)	Short
1976	The Sentimental Bloke	Unknown role	ABC Telelay
1977	Bellbird	Guest roles: Bella / Stella	ABC TV series, 3 episodes (guest)
1979	Taxi	Mrs. Peters	TV film
1979–1986	Prisoner	Regular role: Joyce Barry / Joyce Pringle	Seasons 1–5 (recurring); Seasons 6–8 (regular); 246 episodes
1980	The Sullivans	Guest role: Madame Florence	TV series, (guest, 2 episodes)
1981	Cop Shop	Guest role: Beth Amess	TV series, Season 5 (guest, 1 episode)
1983	Carson's Law	Guest role: Mrs. Hetherington	TV series, 1 episode (guest)
1991	Col'n Carpenter	Guest role	TV series, 1 episode
1991;2003	Neighbours	Guest role: Mrs. Forster	TV series, Season 7, 1 episode)
1991	The Worst Day of My Life	Guest role: Miss Neil	TV series, Season 1, 1 episode
1992–1993	Cluedo	Regular role: Mrs. Blanche White	TV series Seasons 1–2, 21 episodes
1994	The Damnation of Harvey McHugh	Guest role: Head Warder	ABC TV series, 1 episode
1994;2000	Blue Heelers	Guest role: Mrs. Buchanan	TV series, Season 1, 1 episode
2000;2005	Blue Heelers	Guest role: Anne Duffy	TV series, Season 7, 1 episode
2000	Waiting at the Royal	Diana's Mother	TV film
2003	Neighbours	Guest role: Nancy Bliss	TV series, Season 19, 2 episodes
2004	Fergus McPhail	Recurring role: Mrs. Vance	TV series, Season 1, 5 episodes
2005	Blue Heelers	Guest role: Dora Tufnell	TV series, Season 12, 1 episode
2013	It's A Date	Guest role: June	ABC TV series, Season 1, 1 episode

=== Other appearances ===
Year	Team	Role	Notes
1992	In Sydney Today	Herself – Guest	TV series, 1 episode
1986	Punchlines	Herself	TV special
1977	Graham Kennedy's Blankety Blanks	Herself – Panelist	Unknown episode(s)
1976	Ernie	Herself – Regular	TV series Unknown episode(s)
1974–1976	The Ernie Sigley Show	Herself – Regular	TV series, 125 episodes
1972–1975	The Graham Kennedy Show	Herself – Regular	TV series, 121 episodes
1960	With a View to Revue	Herself (as Joy Grisold)	TV special (dated 20 February)
1960	Once More with Fooling	Herself (as Joy Grisold)	TV special (dated 27 February)
1959	Saturday Party	Herself (as Joy Grisold)	2 episodes (dated 18 July 8 August)
1959	Bandwagon	Herself (as Joy Grisold)	Unknown episode(s)
1959	The Teenage Show	Herself (as Joy Grisold)	Unknown episode(s)

== Awards ==
- Penguin Award – Joyce Barry in Prisoner
