= Bellbird (TV series) =

Australian television series

- Genre: Soap opera; Serial
- Created by: Barbara Vernon
- Written by: Barbara Vernon; Alan Hopgood; Michael Wright
- Directed by: James Davern; Oscar Whitbread
- Starring: See cast list
- Country of origin: Australia
- Original language: English
- No. of seasons: 10
- No. of episodes: 1,697

Production
- Producer: Brett Porter
- Running time: Episodes 1–1508 (15 minutes (excluding commercial)); Episodes 1509–1592 (1 Hour); Episodes 1563–1697, (3x half-hour weekly)

Original release
- Network: ABC
- Release: 28 August 1967 – 23 December 1977

Related
- Country Town (film version)

Bellbird is an Australian soap opera serial broadcast in primetime by the ABC created and co-written by Barbara Vernon, it screened for 10 seasons between 1967 and 1977, and spanned 1,697 episodes. The series centered on the residents of the small fictional Victorian rural township of the series title.

Bellbird has the distinction of being the longest-running soap opera/serial ever produced by the ABC. It ended the same year as commercial broadcast series Number 96 and The Box, which had run for six and four years respectively.

== Production and broadcasting ==
The series was produced by the ABC at their Ripponlea Studios in Melbourne, with the opening titles filmed at nearby Daylesford. Bellbird screened from 28 August 1967 to 23 December 1977 and, although it was not Australia's first television serial (the first was Network Seven's Autumn Affair), it was the first successful soap opera and even spawned a feature film and tie-in novel.

The show's ratings were modest but it had a devoted following, especially in rural Australia, akin to the ABC's long-running radio drama Blue Hills. During most of its 10-year production run, 15-minute episodes of Bellbird screened from Monday to Thursday nights, leading in to the 7:00 pm evening news bulletin. In 1976, the series was screened as a single one-hour episode each week, before switching to three half-hour instalments per week during its final season.

== Storylines ==
The show's storylines followed the lives of the residents of the small fictional country town that gave the show its title. While the series plots concentrated mainly on small-scale interpersonal, domestic and local relationships, issues and conflicts, there were occasional moments of high drama. One of the most celebrated was the death of the local stock and station agent, Charlie Cousens, played by foundation cast member Robin Ramsay. When Ramsay decided to leave the series in 1968, his character was written out in dramatic fashion, with Cousens plunging to his death from the top of a wheat silo. The death scene has figured prominently in retrospectives of great moments in Australian television, and its celebrity meant that it became one of the few segments from the early years of the series that has survived.

Other notable deaths during the course of the series included those of local farm girl, Hagar Grossark (Barbara Ramsay), who drowned during a flood, and the 1974 death of major character Rhoda Lang, played by foundation cast member Lynette Curran, who was killed when her car was struck by a train at a level crossing.

== Cast ==
Bellbird featured a regular cast of 46 actors over its 10-year run. The National Archives of Australia holds a collection of prints from 1977, identifying over 30 actors involved from that time.

=== Main / regular ===
Actor	Character	Eps.
Alan Hopgood	Matthew Reed	870 episodes (1972–1977)
Anne Charleston	Wendy Robinson	524 episodes (1971–1973)
Anne Lucas	Glenda Chand	67 episodes (1967)
Anne Phelan	Kate Ashwood	523 episodes (1974–1977)
Anne Scott-Pendlebury	Cathy	143 episodes (1970)
Bob Maza	Gerry Walters	174 episodes (1971)
Brian Hannan	Roger Green	1182 episodes (1970–1977)
Brian James	Ian Bennett	667 episodes (1970–1973)
Briony Behets	Claire	52 episodes (1975)
Bruce Barry	Michael Foley	67 episodes (1967)
Bryon Williams	Adam Lockhart	870 episodes (1972–1977)
Carl Bleazby	Coloniel Jim Emerson	1506 episodes (1968–1977)
Carmel Millhouse	Marge Bacon	1556 episodes (1967–1977)
Clive Winmill	Tony Buckland	92 episodes (1977–1978)
Dennis Miller	Constable Des Davies	986 episodes (1968–1974)
Dorothy Bradley	Rose Lang	1224 episodes (1967–1974)
Elspeth Ballantyne	Laura 'Lori' Chandler	157 episodes (1967–1971)
Gabrielle Hartley	Maggie Emerson	1011 episodes (1969–1974)
Gerda Nicolson	Fiona Davies	1059 episodes (1968–1974)
Gregory Ross	Chris Lang	321 episodes (1974–1975)
Ian Smith	Russell Ashwood	523 episodes (1974–1977)
Jeremy Kewley	Ken Stratton	125 episodes (1976–1977)
Jill Perryman	Cheryl Turner	326 episodes (1971–1975)
John Stanton	Leo Hill	174 episodes (1972)
Julia Blake	Elaine Thomas	675 episodes (1972–1975)
Keith Eden	Gilbert Lang	528 episodes (1967–1970)
Ken Shorter	Duncan Ross	83 episodes (1968)
Kris McQuade	Gail Bennet	173 episodes (1974)
Louise Philip	Christine Jackson	174 episodes (1971)
Lynda Keane	Ruth Grossark	465 episodes (1967–1971)
Lynette Curran	Rhoda Lang	1102 episodes (1967–1974)
Maggie Millar	Georgia Moorhouse	684 episodes (1972–1977)
Maurie Fields	John Quinney	1235 episodes (1969–1977)
Michael Preston	Father John Kramer	396 episodes (1974–1976)
Moira Charleton	Olive Turner	1142 (1969–1977)
Penne Hackforth-Jones	Ginny Hill	347 episodes (1972–1974)
Penny Downie	Kelly Jameson	71 episodes (1976)
Peter Aanensen	Jim Bacon	1381 episodes (1968–1976)
Robin Ramsay	Charlie Cousens	82 episodes (1967–1968)
Rod Mullinar	Scott Leighton	365 episodes (1973–1975)
Ross Thompson	Terry Hill	438 episodes (1972–1974)
Sean Scully	Ron Wilson	353 episodes (1968–1971)
Sheila Florance	Dossie Rumsey	174 episodes (1972)
Stella Lamond	Molly Wilson	589 episodes (1969–1973)
Syd Conabere	Bernie Austin	491 episodes (1970–1972)
Terry McDermott	Max Pearson	836 episodes (1969–1973)
Terry Norris	Joe Turner	(1967–1968)
Tom Oliver	Tom Gray	83 episodes (1969)

=== Recurring / guests ===
Actor	Character	Eps.
Alwyn Kurts	Wes Lewis	6 episodes (1977)
Chuck Faulkner	Captain Doug Daly	6 episodes (1977)
Gerard Kennedy	Edward Grey	3 episodes (1977)
John Meillon		16 episodes (1971)
Marion Edward	Harriet Downs	3 episodes (1976)
Terence Donovan	Neil Farrar	3 episodes (1977)

== Foundation creative team ==
The show was based on a short treatment by Colin Free then developed by original story editor Barbara Vernon. The original story team included Vernon, Alan Hopgood and Michael Wright. The first executive producer was Brett Porter. The original directors were James Davern and Oscar Whitbread.

== International screenings ==
Episodes of Bellbird were screened briefly in the United Kingdom in 1972. After the initial 52 episodes had been screened, Actors Equity in Australia insisted the ABC increase the price of the episodes so as to pay the actors more. As a result of the price increase, the UK broadcaster purchased no further episodes.

== Episodes ==
Although an extensive selection of episodes survive and reside with the National Archives of Australia, it was reported that the ABC taped over the master tapes of the series, which was a common practice of the time something which series cast member Alan Hopgood had complained about in a TV Times article in 1976: "They just wiped [them] off and another episode [was] run over them .... This failure to preserve the program is criminal, to my way of thinking."

One complete black and white episode is available to be viewed at the Australian Mediatheque at the Australian Centre for the Moving Image in Melbourne, while several colour episodes are known to exist in the hands of private collectors.

== Film and novel ==
The series was the first soap opera in Australia to spin off into a feature film version and tie-in novel, entitled Country Town (1971). It focused on Bellbird's problems during a severe drought. Many future soaps followed suit, spawning their own film versions, including Number 96 and The Sullivans.

== Ratings ==
In 1971, Bellbird was the fifteenth most popular show in the country.

== See also ==
- List of Australian television series
- List of programs broadcast by ABC (Australian TV network)
