= Gerda Nicolson =

Australian actress (1936–1992)

- Nicholson in TV series "Prisoner" as Governor Ann Reynolds
- Born: Gerda Maureen Nicolson; 11 November 1936; Hobart, Tasmania, Australia
- Died: 12 June 1992 (aged 55); Melbourne, Victoria, Australia
- Occupation: Actress
- Years active: 1957–1992
- Known for: Prisoner; Bellbird; Bluey
- Spouse: Julius Szappanos (m. 1966)

Gerda Maureen Nicolson (11 November 1936 – 12 June 1992) was an Australian actress, who worked across all major forms of media, including theatre, television and films, she was best known for several long-running television roles, and was a constant presence on the small screen since the early 60s until her death. Nicolson was. best known for her role in cult TV series Prisoner as Governor Ann Reynolds, previously she had appeared in local rural series Bellbird and police detective series Bluey

== Early life ==
Gerda Nicolson was born in Hobart, Tasmania, and as a child moved to Geelong in Melbourne where her parents were both involved in repertory theatre. In 1959, she travelled to London with her parents and attended many stage performances. She initially studied architecture, but decided instead on a performing career, attaining her dramatic training at the St Martin's Theatre, before travelling to London where she worked as a draftsperson.

On returning to Australia in 1961, Nicolson joined Melbourne University's Graduate Society and acted in a number of its amateur stage plays. A year later, she was spotted by a director who encouraged her to audition for a stage play, A Woman in a Dressing Gown. Scoring one of the main roles, she joined the ensemble on its tour of Australia and New Zealand. Nicolson later said that the producer awarded her with the role on account of her stunning legs.

== Career ==
=== Television roles ===
Nicolson featured in a TV production titled The Proposal and the Bear for ABC TV, although she first reached wider audiences through her regular roles on television serials firstly with Crawford Productions long-running rural series Bellbird as Fiona Davies. After leaving that series she had a regular role as Sgt. Monica Rourke in the police detective drama Bluey (1976) opposite Lucky Grills and also featured briefly in The Sullivans (1976) and had a small guest role in Cop Shop, she later in 1989 appeared in a small role in Neighbours as Robyn Taylor, who almost has an affair with Harold Bishop.

== Prisoner ==
She became most widely recognised locally and internationally for her role in the cult soap opera drama series Prisoner (internationally also known as Prisoner: Cell Block H) as Prison Governor Ann Reynolds, joining the cast in 1983 after Patsy King left the series and she assumed the role of the new governor. This was her second role in the show — she had already played a minor guest part as a corrupt officer at another prison in earlier episodes. Nicolson played the role until the series ended in 1986. Prisoner found huge international cult success in the 1990s and 2000s. In 2019, it was announced that Jane Hall would take on the role of Ann Reynolds in the Prisoner reimagining series Wentworth.

== Death and legacy ==
Nicolson collapsed in her dressing room prior to going to stage for theatre performance in Mary Lives! in 1992. Although she was rushed to hospital, she never regained consciousness and died on 12 June, aged 55. The cause of death was a brain-related haemorrhage. Pat Bishop assumed the role.

Green Room Award: The Gerda Nicolson Award (for an Emerging Actress) was instituted in her name to commemorate her work in Australian theatre, as she is recognised as one of Victoria's finest female actors. This award, protected by The Green Room Awards Association, was presented to the recipient by her widower until his death in 2006. Recipients included Alison Whyte, Peta Brady and Kat Stewart.

Gerda Nicolson Award for Indigenous female students studying at the Victorian College of the Arts in the areas of performing arts. This award was hosted through the Wilin Centre for an undergraduate student.

== Filmography ==
=== Film ===
Title	Year	Role	Notes
Country Town	1971	Fiona Davies	Feature Film adaptation of the television series Bellbird
The Devil's Playground	1976	Mrs. Allen	Feature film
The Getting of Wisdom	1977	Minor role	Feature film
The Quick Brown Fox	1980	Mrs. Flint	Film short
Gallipoli	1981	Rose Hamilton	Feature film
Next of Kin	1982	Connie	Feature film
The Clinic	1982	Linda	Feature film
Belinda	1987	Belinda's Mother	Feature film
In Too Deep	1989	Mrs. Lyall	Feature film

=== Television ===
Title	Year	Role	Notes
Consider Your Verdict	1964	Minor Role	Seven Network • "Queen Versus Grainger"
Homicide	1965	Carol Barwick	Seven Network • "One Man Crime Wave" (#2.16)
Hunter	1967	Marion Tolhurst	Nine Network • 4 episodes
Homicide	1967	Anne Elliot	Seven Network • "One Last Wish" (#4.41)
Homicide	1968	Policewoman Reed	Seven Network • "Valley of Silence" (#5.34)
Homicide	1968	Tess Barker	Seven Network • "Objection Sustained" (#5.37)
Hunter	1968	Janet McGregor	Nine Network • 1 episode
Bellbird	1968–1974	Fiona Davies	ABC • 1,064 episodes
Division 4	1969	Ellen Finch	Nine Network • "The Victim" (#1.28)
Matlock Police	1971	Kate Maddern	Network Ten • "The Big Gun" (#1.2)
Boney	1972	Clare Joyce	"Boney and the Monster" (#1.10)
Ryan	1974	Mary	Seven Network • "Give Them the World" (#1.34)
Division 4	1975	Mrs. Laston	Nine Network • "Take No for an Answer" (#7.20)
Homicide	1975	Julie Edwards	Seven Network • "A Quiet Place" (#12.28)
Quality of Mercy	1975	Minor role	ABC TV series, 1 episode 6: "We Should Have Had a Uniform" (#1.6)
The Sullivans	1976	Mrs. Turnbull	Nine Network • Season 1, unknown episode(s)
Bluey	1976–1977	Monica Rourke	Seven Network • Season 1 (all 39 episodes)
Cop Shop	1978	Marion O'Reilly	Seven Network • 13 episodes
Chopper Squad	1979	Enid Paramor	Network Ten • "No Strings" (#2.11)
Skyways	1979	Joan Fitzgerald	Seven Network • Episode: "The Legend"
Young Ramsay	1980	Beth Emery	Seven Network • "Dyed in the Wool" (#2.13)
Prisoner	1981	Mrs. Roberts	Network Ten • Season 3 (2 episodes)
Prisoner	1983–1986	Ann Reynolds	Network Ten • Seasons 5–8 (317 episodes)
Neighbours	1989	Robyn Taylor	Network Ten • Season 5 (10 episodes)
Bangkok Hilton	1989	Lady Faulkner	Network Ten • Miniseries (all 3 episodes)
Skirts	1990	Guest role: Caroline	TV series, 1 episode 6: "Parents Ain't What They Used To Be"
Boys from the Bush	1991	Betty	BBC One • "Mateship" (#1.8)
Golden Fiddles	1991	Miss Birrell	Nine Network • Miniseries (2 episodes), (final role)

=== Television film ===
Title	Year	Role	Notes
Nude with Violin	1964	Jane Sorodin	ABC movie
Everyman	1964	Cousin	ABC movie
The Physicists	1964	Minor Role	ABC movie
Ashes to Ashes	1966	Barbara Manson	ABC movie
Out of Love	1974	Minor Role	Story 3: "Separate Ways"

== Awards & nominations ==
Year	Nominated work	Award	Result
1977	Bluey	Logie Best Supporting Actress	Nominated
1985	Prisoner	Logie Best Supporting Actress	Nominated
1985	Prisoner	Penguin Award for Best Sustained Performance	Won
