= Country Town =

- Directed by: Peter Maxwell
- Written by: Barbara Vernon
- Produced by: Fenton Rosewarne
- Starring: Terry McDermott
- Cinematography: Bruce McNaughton
- Edited by: Raymond Daley
- Music by: Bruce Clarke
- Production companies: Outback Films; Avargo Productions
- Distributed by: Gary Gray; Terry McDermott
- Release date: 19 June 1971
- Running time: 106 minutes
- Country: Australia
- Language: English
- Budget: $85,000

Bellbird: A Country Town is a 1971 Australian drama film directed by Peter Maxwell, produced by Fenton Rosewarne and starring Terry McDermott, Gary Gray and Lynette Curran. It was a film version of the Australian television series Bellbird, written by Barbara Vernon.

== Plot ==
A severe drought strikes the town of Bellbird. Young reporter Philip Henderson arrives and stirs old tensions. The locals rally together and hold a fund-raising gymkhana.

== Cast ==
- Terry McDermott – Max Pearson
- Gary Gray – David Emerson
- Lynette Curran – Rhoda Wilson
- Gerard Maguire – Philip Henderson
- Sue Parsons – Jean Fowler
- Gerda Nicolson - Fiona Davies
- Carl Bleazby – Jim Emerson
- Maurie Fields – John Quinney
- Carmel Millhouse – Marge Bacon
- Brian Anderson – Stan Bacon
- Margaret Cruickshank – Doctor Liz
- Mark Albiston – Bob Wright
- Kirsty Child – Julie
- Frank Rich – Giorgio Lini
- Rosie Sturgess – Anna Maria Lini
- Kurt Ludescher – Grossark
- Sheila Florance – Old Mrs Bacon
- Peter Cummins – First Lair

== Production ==
The film was made in January 1971 during a break in production from filming the TV series. Although most of the regular cast were involved and the script was written by Barbara Vernon, who was one of the main writers on the show, the ABC was not formally involved in production. The movie was the idea of two regular cast members, Gary Gray and Terry McDermott who formed a production company, Avargo, with Fenton Rosewarne, an ABC film editor, and Rod Barnett, a chartered accountant. English director Peter Maxwell, who had extensive experience of working in Australia, was hired to direct.

The film was shot on 16mm over four weeks on a $70,000 budget starting late January 1971. Yea in Victoria was the main location with drought scenes shot in Wentworth, New South Wales. After editing was completed the Australian Film Development Corporation provided $15,000 to help prepare 35 mm prints.

== Release ==
The film was distributed by Gray and McDermott themselves, released first in country areas then reaching Sydney in 1973.
