= Terrie Waddell =

Australian actress

- Born: 1961 or 1962 (age 63–64)
- Occupation(s): Actress, lecturer
- Known for: Lisa Mullins in Prisoner

Terrie Waddell is an Australian former actress best known for her role as Lisa Mullins in the television series Prisoner.

== Career ==
Waddell is a graduate of the Victorian College of the Arts. Upon her graduation, she appeared in theatre, before she was offered the role of Lisa Mullins in Prisoner during its final season in 1986. She had little acting experience when she was approached to play the role at short notice, replacing Nicki Paull, who had taken ill during production. The producers chose Waddell due to her likeness to Nicki Paull. She remained in the series until its final episode.

She subsequently moved away from acting to become a lecturer in media studies at La Trobe University.

== Filmography ==
=== Film ===
| Year | Title | Role | Notes |
|---|---|---|---|
| 1988 | Evil Angels | Mary Walsh | |
| 1990 | Golden Braid | Waitress | |

=== Television ===
| Year | Title | Role | Notes |
|---|---|---|---|
| 1986 | Prisoner | Lisa Mullins | 32 episodes |
| 1987 | Neighbours | Meredith Lord | 2 episodes |
| 1987 | A Country Practice | Darlene Spencer | 2 episodes |
| 1994 | Wedlocked | Julia | 3 episodes |
| 1997 | State Coroner | Feldman | Episode: "Starting with a Bang" |
| 2022 | Talking Prisoner | Self | Podcast Series 1 episode |

=== Video games ===
| Year | Title | Role | Notes |
|---|---|---|---|
| 1996 | The Dame Was Loaded | Frankie Henderson | |

== Bibliography ==
- Mis/takes: Archetype, Myth and Identity in Screen Fiction, 2006.
- Wild/lives: Trickster, Place and Liminality on Screen, 2014.
- Eavesdropping: The Psychotherapist in Film and Television, 2015.
- The Lost Child Complex in Australian Film: Jung, Story and Playing Beneath the Past, 2019.
