= Prisoner (TV series) =

Australian television drama series

- Also known as: Prisoners (working title); Prisoner: Cell Block H (UK and United States); Caged Women (Canada); Kvinnofängelset (The Women's Prison; Sweden); Więźniarki (Prisoners; Poland); Celblok H (Cellblock H; Netherlands); As Prisioneiras (Prisoners; Brazil)
- Genre: Soap opera serial Crime drama
- Created by: Reg Watson
- Written by: Ian Smith, Anne Lucas, Coral Drouyn
- Directed by: Chris Adshead; Steve Mann; Sean Nash; Kendal Flanagan; Leigh Spence; Tony Osicka (and others) (Note: For a complete listing of directors and writers, see http://www.wwwentworth.co.uk/writdirx.htm)
- Starring: (see List of Prisoner cast members)
- Theme music composer: Allan Caswell; Conductor – William Motzing
- Ending theme: "On the Inside" (written by Allan Caswell, conducted by William Motzing performed by Lynne Hamilton)
- Country of origin: Australia
- Original language: English
- No. of seasons: 8
- No. of episodes: 692 (list of episodes)

Production
- Executive producer: Ian Bradley (from season 2)
- Producers: Ian Bradley (season 1), Ian Smith
- Production locations: Melbourne, Victoria
- Camera setup: Video
- Running time: 41–53 minutes
- Production company: Reg Grundy Organisation

Original release
- Network: Network Ten
- Release: 27 February 1979 – 11 December 1986

Related
- Willow B: Women in Prison; Wentworth; Wentworth: Halfway Home

Prisoner (known in the UK and the US as Prisoner: Cell Block H and in Canada as Caged Women) is an Australian television soap opera, which was broadcast on Network Ten (formerly the 0-10 Network) from 27 February 1979 (Melbourne) and 26 February 1979 (Sydney) to 11 December 1986 (Melbourne) and 29 September 1987 (Sydney) (Note: The series finale would not screen until September 1987 in Sydney, where it aired as a two-hour episode at the much-later time slot of 10:30 p.m.) running eight series and 692 episodes.

Prisoner was the first Australian series to feature a primarily female-dominated cast and carried the slogan "If you think prison is hell for a man, imagine what it would be like for a woman!"

The series, produced by the Grundy Organisation, was conceived by Reg Watson and filmed at the Network Ten Melbourne Studios at Nunawading and on location. The series garnered an international cult following, and it was one of Australia's most successful media exports, screening in 80 countries, performing particularly well in the United States and Canada. It also built a large audience in the United Kingdom and other European countries, especially Sweden.

The cult status of the series has seen many adaptations, including the modern 21st-century re-imaging Australian series Wentworth on Foxtel.

== Background ==
Ian Bradley served as original producer and then executive producer, from series 2, while associate producer and screenwriter was Ian Smith, who appeared as an actor in the series as Head of the Department Ted Douglas, prior to becoming famous as the character Harold Bishop in Neighbours; another screenwriter, Anne Lucas, also acted briefly in the series playing prison bookie Faye Quinn.

The series is loosely based on British prison drama series Within These Walls, although it focuses more on the prisoners or inmates, rather than the prison staff led by officious governor Faye Boswell, played by Googie Withers, who was even approached by producers of Prisoner to play the governor.

The series is set in the fictional Wentworth Detention Centre in the fictional suburb of Wentworth in Melbourne, Victoria, and follows the lives of the prisoners and staff within cell block H and, to a lesser extent, others on the outside such as family members, doctors and lawyers. Numerous scenes also took place outside the compound exploring the lives of the inmates and staff outside of the prison; in particular, "Driscoll House", a halfway house where inmates were housed after being released, or neighbouring correction institutions like Barnhurst (a lower-security country prison) and Blackmoor (an aged, yet high-security, prison).

The series gained a positive reception. Initially conceived as a standalone miniseries of 16 episodes, its popularity meant it was developed into an ongoing series. It has since endured worldwide, acquiring cult classic status, particularly for its occasionally outrageous plotlines.

== Creation and production ==
Prisoner was created by Reg Watson, who had produced the British soap opera Crossroads from 1964 to 1973 and then the Australian soaps The Young Doctors and (post-Prisoner) Sons and Daughters and Neighbours.

Inspired by the British television drama Within These Walls, the show was initially conceived as a 16-episode series, with a pilot episode bearing the working title "Women Behind Bars". (Note: "Women Behind Bars" would later be used in the US as a subtitle to a series of paperback novelisations released by Pinnacle Books (see the "Books" section).) Its storylines focused on the lives of the prisoners and, to a lesser extent, the officers and other prison staff. When the initial episodes met an enthusiastic reception, it was felt that Prisoner could be developed into an ongoing soap opera. The early storylines were developed and expanded, with assistance from the Victorian Corrective Services Department.

The show's themes, often radical, included feminism, sexuality and social reform. Prisoner began in early 1979 with the advertising slogan, "If you think prison is hell for a man, imagine what it's like for a woman". The series examined how women dealt with incarceration and separation from their families and friends, and the common phenomenon of released inmates re-offending. Within the prison, major themes were interpersonal relationships, power struggles, friendships and rivalries. The prisoners became a surrogate family, with the self-styled "Queen Bea", Bea Smith (played by Val Lehman) and the elderly "Mum" (Jeanette) Brooks (Mary Ward) emerging as central matriarch figures. Several lesbian characters were introduced on the show, including prisoners Franky Doyle (played by Carol Burns), Sharon Gilmour (played by Margot Knight) and Judy Bryant (played by Betty Bobbitt), lawyer Angela Jeffries (played by Jeanie Drynan) and corrupt and sinister officer Joan Ferguson (Maggie Kirkpatrick).

== Continuity ==
Characters and story exposition were often 'retconned' in order to expand potential storylines. Initially there was a men's prison "next door" to Wentworth, but it was never mentioned again after the early episodes. Barnhurst was originally a co-ed prison, soon becoming a women's facility. Its security status varied considerably, with it being described as an 'open prison farm' by the end of the run; although it was often described as "low-security", serial murderers Bea Smith and Marie Winter were housed there for long periods. Although Blackmoor Prison was initially described as a brand-new, state-of-the-art maximum-security prison, it was depicted as a Victorian-era workhouse when finally seen. Wentworth was variously described as either new or built during World War II, with aged infrastructure.

During the show's run, several recurring characters were played by multiple actresses and actors. Meg Jackson's (later Morris) (Elspeth Ballantyne) son and stepdaughter, Marty Jackson and Tracey Morris, were each played by multiple actors—Ronald Korosy, Andrew McKaige and Michael Winchester as Marty, and Sue Devine and Michelle Thomas as Tracey. In the closing year, Nicki Paull's character Lisa Mullins was taken over by Terrie Waddell when Paull fell ill early into the role.

== Synopsis ==
Prisoner cast from early 1979. Seated: Bea Smith (Val Lehman). Standing, right to left: Karen Travers (Peta Toppano), Franky Doyle (Carol Burns), Doreen Anderson (Colette Mann), Chrissie Latham (Amanda Muggleton) and a background prisoner, later known as Lorna Young (Barbara Jungwirth)

Viewers' introduction to the Wentworth Detention Centre featured the arrival of two new prisoners, Karen Travers (Peta Toppano) (Note: Peta Toppano's first name was spelled in the closing credits as "Peita", her actual spelling. Both "Peta" and "Peita" are used in other television programs, movies and magazine articles.) and Lynn Warner (Kerry Armstrong). Travers was charged with murdering her husband in a crime of passion after he was found in bed with another woman (her flashback featured a shower scene that was a nod to Alfred Hitchcock's classic Psycho), while Warner insisted she was innocent despite her conviction for the abduction and attempted murder of a child. Both women were sent to the prison's maximum-security wing (H Block), where they were horrified by their new surroundings. Karen was confronted with a former lover—prison doctor Greg Miller (Barry Quin)—and was sexually harassed by violent lesbian cellmate Franky Doyle (Carol Burns). Lynn was ostracised by the other prisoners because of her crime (prisoners are known for their intolerance of offenders against children) and terrorised by Bea Smith, who burnt Lynn's hand in the laundry's steam press in one of the series' most iconic early scenes.

Other, less-volatile, prisoners included elderly garden-loving Jeanette "Mum" Brooks (Mary Ward), who was incarcerated for the euthanasia of her husband who had terminal cancer, teddy-clutching misfit and childlike Doreen Anderson (Colette Mann), alcoholic former cook recidivist Lizzie Birdsworth (Sheila Florance), who apparently poisoned a group of shearers, and seductive prostitute Gladys "Marilyn" Mason (Margaret Laurence), who seduced prison electrician Eddie Cook (Richard Moir). The prison officers (or "screws", as the prisoners call them) included firm-but-fair, well-heeled governor Erica Davidson (Patsy King); dour deputy governor Vera Bennett (Fiona Spence), who was always wanting to become Governor and was nicknamed "Vinegar Tits" by Franky; and firm but compassionate senior officer Meg Jackson (later Morris) (Elspeth Ballantyne).

Early episodes featured a high level of violence: Lynn Warner's burning in a steam press; a prisoner hanging herself in her cell; a fatal stabbing; and a flashback sequence triggered by the time Karen Travers stabbed her abusive husband to death in the shower. The series' first major story arc was the turf war between Bea and Franky, in a bid to become the prison's "Top Dog" (unofficial leader), culminating by episode 3 in a riot where Meg was held hostage and her husband—prison social worker Bill Jackson (Don Barker)—was stabbed to death by inmate Chrissie Latham (Amanda Muggleton).

=== Series extension ===
Prisoner premiered in Australia on 27 February 1979. (Note: 27 February 1979 was when the series debuted on ATV-10 as a two-hour special; the show had its national debut in Sydney on TEN-10 the night before on 26 February, where it was televised as a two-part premiere, with the second part seen on 27 February.) Its success prompted the producers to extend the series, first from 16 to 20 episodes and then indefinitely. The production schedule increased from one- to two-hour-long episodes per week; Carol Burns left the show after 20 episodes, feeling that she could not continue playing Franky Doyle with the tighter schedule. Her storyline sees her as an escapee from Wentworth with fellow inmate Doreen Anderson, and after being on the run for three weeks, she is shot dead by a policeman.

New story arcs were introduced. Karen Travers appealed against her sentence and was eventually released, allowing her to resume her relationship with Greg Miller and becoming involved in prison reform. As original characters began leaving the series (Mum Brooks, Lynn Warner, Karen and Greg appeared beyond the initial sixteen episodes, but most had left by the end of the 1979 season; Greg left in early 1980), new characters arrived: hulking husband-beater Monica Ferguson (Lesley Baker), career criminal Noeline Bourke (Jude Kuring), troubled murderess Roslyn Coulson (Sigrid Thornton) and imprisoned mother Pat O'Connell (Monica Maughan), in addition to shorter-term inmates with brief storylines. Prostitute Chrissie Latham, a minor character in the early episodes, returned in a more central antagonistic role and a male deputy governor, Jim Fletcher (Gerard Maguire), joined the female-dominated cast.

=== Final season ===
Ratings had been declining for some time, and when they continued to fall in 1986, Network Ten decided in July not to renew the series. Production ended on 5 September, and the final episode aired in Melbourne on 11 December 1986. (Note: In some areas of Australia, the Prisoner finale did not air until well into 1987. One example is in Sydney, in which TEN-10 did not screen the final two episodes until 29 September 1987, where they aired in a late-night slot at 11:05 p.m.; two years earlier, TEN-10 began airing Prisoner once a week, instead of twice. In some areas of Australia, Prisoner was taken off the air long before the final episode; examples include Perth, where Nine Network station STW-9 cancelled the series after episode 542. (STW and Seven Network outlet TVW-7 shared Network Ten's programming until the sign-on of NEW-10 in 1988.)) The producers had several weeks' notice that the series was ending, enabling them to construct strong concluding storylines (including the ultimate defeat of Joan "the Freak" Ferguson). Prisoner's final episodes dealt with the redemption of the misunderstood Kath Maxwell and concluded the ongoing dynamic between Rita Connors (played by Glenda Linscott) and Joan Ferguson (Maggie Kirkpatrick).

== Core cast members ==
The following characters appear in twenty or more episodes. For extended cast list, see article: Prisoner cast list

Actor	Character	Appears in
Val Lehman	Bea "Queen Bea" Smith	series 1–5, episodes 1–400
Carol Burns	Franky Doyle	series 1, episodes 1–20
Peta Toppano	Karen Travers	series 1–2, episodes 1–80
Kerry Armstrong	Lynn "Wonky" Warner	series 1, episodes 1–44
Patsy King	Erica Davidson	series 1–5, episodes 1–5
Elspeth Ballantyne	Meg Jackson (later Morris)	series 1–8, episodes 1–692
Colette Mann	Doreen Anderson (later Burns)	series 1–6, episodes 1–446
Sheila Florance	Elizabeth "Lizzie" Birdsworth	series 1–6, episodes 1–418
Barry Quin	Dr. Greg Miller	series 1–2, episodes 1–110
Fiona Spence	Vera "Vinegar Tits" Bennett	series 1–3, episodes 1–224
Mary Ward	Jeanette "Mum" Brooks	series 1–3, episodes 1–204
Amanda Muggleton	Chrissie Latham	series 1–4, episodes 3–338
Terry Gill	Detective Inspector Jack Grace	series 1–8, episodes 8–635
Christine Amor	Jean Vernon	series 1, episodes 14–56
Lesley Baker	Monica "Monnie" Ferguson	series 1, episodes 15–60
James Smillie	Steve Wilson	series 1, episodes 15–42
Bryon Williams	Dr. Weissman	series 1–8, episodes 28–589
Joy Westmore	Officer Joyce Barry Pringle	series 1–8, episodes 29–692
Penny Stewart	Kathleen Leach	series 1–2, episodes 30–149
Jude Kuring	Noeline Burke	series 1–2, episodes 30–149
Gerard Maguire	Deputy Governor Jim "Fletch The Letch" Fletcher	series 1–4, episodes 40–256
Judith McGrath	Colleen "Po-Face" Powell	series 1–6, episodes 48–456
Reylene Pearce	Phyllis Hunt	series 1–6, episodes 21–460
Ian Smith	Ted Douglas	series 1–5, episodes 61–382
Sigrid Thornton	Roslyn Coulson	series 1–2, episodes 63–92
Monica Maughan	Patricia "Pat" O'Connell	series 1–2, episodes 65–110
George Mallaby	Paul Reid	series 2, episodes 85–130
Ian Gilmour	Kevin Burns	series 2, episodes 89–139
Rosalind Speirs	Caroline Simpson	series 2, episodes 89–114
Margot Knight	Sharon Gilmour	series 2, episodes 90–116
Betty Bobbitt	Judith "Judy" Bryant	series 2–7, episodes 91–534
Jane Clifton	Margo Gaffney	series 2–6, episodes 92–448
Jentah Sobott	Heather "Mouse" Trapp	series 2–4, episodes 106–326 (previously background extra)
Caroline Gillmer	Helen Smart	series 2–6, episodes 118–441
Sue Devine	Tracey Morris	series 2–3, episodes 141–198
Belinda Davey	Hazel Kent	series 2–5, episodes 142–399
Anthony Hawkins	Bob Morris	series 2–4, episodes 143–260
Maureen Edwards	Officer Sue Bailey	series 2–8, episodes 151–629
Anne Phelan	Myra Desmond	series 2–7, episodes 154–552
Alan Hopgood	Albert "Wally" Wallace	series 3–6, episodes 167–466
Serge Lazareff	David Andrews	series 3, episodes 171–194
Maggie Millar	Marie Winter	series 3–6, episodes 197–471
Brian Hannan	Terry Harrison	series 3, episodes 199–223
Kate Sheil	Janet Conway	series 3–4, episodes 232–274
Olivia Hamnett	Dr. Kathryn "Kate" Peterson	series 3–4, episodes 235–273
Louise Le Nay	Sandy Edwards	series 3–4, episodes 235–264
Wayne Jarratt	Steve Faulkner	series 3–4, episodes 245–316
Jacqui Gordon	Susan "Susie" Driscoll	series 4, episodes 260–302
Anne Lucas	Faye Quinn	series 4–5, episodes 285–352
Maggie Kirkpatrick	Joan "The Freak" Ferguson	series 4–8, episodes 287–692
Lisa Crittenden	Maxine Daniels	series 4–5, episodes 297–391
Susan Guerin	Barbara "Barbie" Fields	series 4, episodes 300–326
Anna Hruby	Paddy Lawson	series 4–5, episodes 304–339
Alan David Lee	Tony Berman	series 4–5, episodes 306–329
Carole Skinner	Nola McKenzie	series 5, episodes 331–369
Gerda Nicolson	Governor Ann "Reyno" Reynolds	series 5–8, episodes 364–692
Wanda Davidson	Frances Harvey	series 5–7, episodes 373–525
Judy McBurney	Sandra "Pixie" Mason	series 5–7, episodes 377–510
Tim Elston	Dr. Scott Collins	series 5–6, episodes 383–418
Penny Maegraith	Petra Roberts	series 5, episodes 383–407
Tina Bursill	Sonia Stevens	series 5–6, episodes 394–447
Babs McMillan	Cass Parker	series 5–6, episodes 401–460
Maxine Klibingaitis	Roberta "Bobbie" Mitchell	series 5–7, episodes 405–533
Wendy Playfair	Minerva "Minnie" Donovan	series 5–6, episodes 405–437
Andy Anderson	Rick Manning	series 6, episodes 421–458
Janet Andrewartha	Rebecca "Reb" Kean	series 6–8, episodes 422–589
Brian James	Stanley "Stan The Man" Dobson	series 6–7, episodes 425–513
Lois Collinder	Alice "Lurch" Jenkins	series 6–8, episodes 448–692 (previously background extra)
Kim Trengove	Rachel Millsom	series 6, episodes 450–472
Louise Siversen	Louise "Lou" Kelly	series 6–8, episodes 452–616 (previously background extra)
Nigel Bradshaw	Officer Dennis "The Yorkshire Pud" Cruickshank	series 6–7, episodes 457–560
Genevieve Lemon	Marlene "Rabbit" Warren Delaney	series 6–7, episodes 461–534
Victoria Nicholls	Heather Rodgers	series 6, episodes 461–484
Alethea McGrath	Dot Farrar	series 6, episodes 462–486
Robert Summers	Shane Munroe	series 6–7, episodes 462–527
Dorothy Cutts	Officer Patricia "Pat" Slattery	series 6–8, episodes 473–690
Steve Kuhn	Philip Cleary	series 6, episodes 475–498
Robyn Gibbes	Samantha "Sam" Greenway	series 6–7, episodes 495–520
Peter Bensley	Matt Delaney	series 6–7, episodes 499–533
Leslie Dayman	Geoff Macrae	series 6–7, episodes 500–556
Trevor Kent	Francis "Frank" Burke	series 6–7, episodes 500–555
Pepe Trevor	Alexis "Lexie" Patterson	series 7–8, episodes 509–650
Lois Ramsey	Ethel May "Ettie" Parslow	series 7–8, episodes 514–600
Ernie Bourne	Mervin "Merv The Perv" Pringle	series 7–8, episodes 523–691
Sonja Tallis	Nora Flynn	series 7, episodes 537–588
Billie Hammerberg	May "Auntie May" Collins	series 7, episodes 537–587
Kirsty Child	Wilhelmina "Willie" Beecham	series 7–8, episodes 537–682
Jackie Woodburne	Julie "Chook" Egbert Ryan	series 7–8, episodes 537–628
Debra Lawrance	Daphne "Daffy" Graham	series 7–8, episodes 537–590
Christine Harris	Pippa Reynolds	series 7–8, episodes 540–604
Jenny Lovell	Jennifer "Jenny" Hartley	series 7, episodes 540–588
James Condon	James Dwyer	series 7–8, episodes 561–689
Kevin Summers	Ben Fulbright	series 7–8, episodes 563–604
Lynda Stoner	Eve Wilder	series 7–8, episodes 574–600
Glenda Linscott	Rita "The Beater" Connors	series 7–8, episodes 585–692
Julia Blake	Nancy McCormack	series 8, episodes 589–650
Pat Evison	Jessie Windom	series 8, episodes 589–620
Sean Scully	Dan Moulton	series 8, episodes 590–654
Peter Hayes	Dr. Steve Ryan	series 8, episodes 592–628
Linda Hartley	Rachel "Roach" Waters	series 8, episodes 595–643
Peter Adams	Acting Governor Bob Moran	series 8, episodes 595–620
Christine Earle	Janet "Maggot" Williams	series 8, episodes 599–639
Kate Hood	Katherine "Kath" Maxwell	series 8, episodes 601–692
Rebecca Dines	Vicki McPherson	series 8, episodes 608–692
Paula Duncan	Lorelei "Snook" Wilkinson	series 8, episodes 623–677
Rosanne Hull-Brown	Merle "Looney" Jones	series 8, episodes 625–692
Michael Winchester	Marty Jackson	series 8, episodes 625–692
Philip Hyde	Rodney Adams	series 8, episodes 630–692
Desiree Smith	Delia Stout	series 8, episodes 630–679
Taya Straton	Rose "Spider" Simpson	series 8, episodes 649–686
Terrie Waddell	Lisa Mullins	series 8, episodes 651–692
Sheryl Munks	Michelle "Brumby" Tucker	series 8, episodes 665–692
Victoria Rowland	Margaret "Spike" Marsh	series 8, episodes 665–691

=== Opening titles sequence ===
Each episode opens with mug shots of three to four main cast members, which change from year to year. 25 different characters appear in total (in chronological order):

- Peta Toppano as Karen Travers (series 1–2, episodes 1–12, 15–80)
- Kerry Armstrong as Lynn Warner (series 1, episodes 1–48)
- Val Lehman as Bea Smith (series 1–5, episodes 1–12, 15–400)
- Colette Mann as Doreen Anderson (series 1–4, episodes 13–14, 81–306)
- Carol Burns as Franky Doyle (series 1, episodes 13–14)
- Sheila Florance as Lizzie Birdsworth (series 1–6, episodes 49–418)
- Betty Bobbitt as Judy Bryant (series 4–7, episodes 307–334, 419–534)
- Carole Skinner as Nola McKenzie (series 5, episodes 335–352)
- Marina Finlay as Lainie Dobson (series 5, episodes 353–356)
- Alyson Best as Tracey Belman (series 5, episodes 368–372)
- Lisa Crittenden as Maxine Daniels (series 5, episodes 373–392)
- Judy McBurney as Pixie Mason (series 5–6, episodes 393–396, 401–418)
- Tina Bursill as Sonia Stevens (series 5–6, episodes 397–447)
- Maxine Klibingaitis as Bobbie Mitchell (series 6–7, episodes 419–441, 507–514)
- Babs McMillan as Cass Parker (series 6, episodes 442–462)
- Anne Phelan as Myra Desmond (series 6–7, episodes 448–552)
- Janet Andrewartha as Reb Kean (series 6–7, episodes 463–506)
- Genevieve Lemon as Marlene Warren (series 7, episodes 515–534)
- Pepe Trevor as Lexie Patterson (series 7–8, episodes 535–548, 553–650)
- Louise Siversen as Lou Kelly (series 7–8, episodes 535–616)
- Sonja Tallis as Nora Flynn (series 7–8, episodes 539–592)
- Jackie Woodburne as Julie Egbert (series 8, episodes 593–626)
- Lois Collinder as Alice Jenkins (series 8, episodes 617–692)
- Glenda Linscott as Rita Connors (series 8, episodes 627–692)
- Kate Hood as Kath Maxwell (series 8, episodes 647–692)

== Episodes ==
=== Melbourne ===
The transmission dates in this chart reflect the broadcasts on Network Ten Melbourne Station ATV-10, which is the official eight-season structure for the series. Dates and times varied in Sydney (see below) and in other regions of Australia, broadcasting season in alternative order.

Season	Episodes	Originally released	
Season	Episodes	First released	Last released
1	1–79 (79)	27 February 1979	28 November 1979
2	80–165 (86)	22 January 1980	12 November 1980
3	166–246 (81)	4 February 1981	11 November 1981
4	247–326 (80)	9 February 1982	9 November 1982
5	327–416 (90)	1 February 1983	3 November 1983
6	417–505 (89)	17 January 1984	8 November 1984
7	506–588 (83)	24 January 1985	5 November 1985
8	589–692 (104)	9 January 1986	11 December 1986

=== Sydney ===
The episodes on Network Ten Sydney Station TEN-10 were often several weeks or more behind those airing on its Melbourne counterpart, particularly in the later seasons, although there were some occasions in the early years when Sydney viewers saw the episodes first. In some years, the total number of episodes shown in a "season" differed between the markets, meaning they ended the year on different episodes.

For example, Episode 166, which was the 1981 season return in Melbourne and showed the aftermath of a tunnel collapse, was shown as the 1980 finale in Sydney. Although we learned in this episode which prisoners had survived the collapse, some were still trapped underground at the end of the episode, so there was still an element of the cliffhanger as viewers waited to find out if they would be rescued.

Conversely, the final episode shown in Sydney in 1984 was Episode 500, which concluded with a warehouse exploding in which two prison staff were being held against their will. This was a much stronger cliffhanger than that of Episode 505, which was the final episode of the year in Melbourne.

Season	Episodes	Originally released	
Season	Episodes	First released	Last released
1	1–84 (84)	26 February 1979	11 December 1979
2	85–166 (82)	4 February 1980	10 November 1980
3	167–246 (80)	10 February 1981	10 November 1981
4	247–326 (80)	15 February 1982	6 December 1982
5	327–416 (90)	1 February 1983	15 December 1983
6	417–500 (84)	31 January 1984	13 December 1984
7	501–588 (88)	29 January 1985	21 November 1985
8	589–692 (104)	14 January 1986	29 September 1987

== Spin-offs, remakes and specials ==
=== Spin-offs ===
==== Punishment ====
This was a short lived spin off based in a male prison. Early episodes starred Mel Gibson. The show was not a ratings success and was removed from prime time schedules after only four episodes.

==== Willow B: Women in Prison ====
A pilot for an unproduced American version of Prisoner was produced by Lorimar in 1980, entitled Willow B: Women in Prison. The cast included Ruth Roman, Virginia Capers, Carol Lynley and Sally Kirkland. The pilot aired on ABC-TV on 29 June 1980.

==== Wentworth ====
In March 2012, it was announced that Foxtel would produce a contemporary "re-imagining" of Prisoner, titled Wentworth, set in modern-day Australia. Wentworth recounts the rise of Bea Smith (Danielle Cormack) from her arrival at Wentworth as a remand prisoner to "top dog". The series is filmed at a new, purpose-built prison set in the Melbourne suburb of Clayton.

Wentworth features contemporary versions of vintage characters along with new characters. Other characters and cast members include crime matriarch Jacs Holt (Kris McQuade), Liz Birdsworth (Celia Ireland), Doreen Anderson (Shareena Clanton), Franky Doyle (Nicole da Silva), Sue "Boomer" Jenkins (Katrina Milosevic), social worker Erica Davidson (Leeanna Walsman), officer Will Jackson (Robbie Magasiva), officer Matthew Fletcher (Aaron Jeffery), deputy governor Vera Bennett (Kate Atkinson), and governor Meg Jackson (Catherine McClements), and later included Linda Miles (Jacquie Brennan), Joan Ferguson (Pamela Rabe), Sean Brody (Rick Donald), Greg Miller (David de Lautour), Marie Winter (Susie Porter) and Rita Connors (Leah Purcell).

None of the original Prisoner cast were initially scheduled to appear in the first series, but on 29 November 2012 it was confirmed that Anne Charleston (who appeared in the original series) would make a guest appearance. Wentworth premiered in Australia on Foxtel's SoHo channel on 1 May 2013. Wentworth ended in 2021 after nine seasons. It did not surpass Prisoner in terms of number of episodes (Wentworth produced only ten to twelve episodes per year culminating in 100 episodes over the course of its run, compared to 692 episodes for Prisoner), but surpassed it in the number of years on air. Thirteen actors who appeared in Prisoner also appeared in Wentworth in a guest capacity. These included Sigrid Thornton, who was in the original series as Ros Coulson, joining the Wentworth cast to play Sonia Stevens. In an ironic twist, Tina Bursill, who originally played Sonia Stevens in Prisoner, was cast in the final series of Wentworth as Eve Wilder.

=== Spoofs ===
In 1980 Saturday Night Live aired a parody of the series, "Debs Behind Bars". In the sketch, the inmates (including guest host Teri Garr) are spoiled debutantes who complain about "icky" living conditions in prison. During the early 1990s, Seven Network's comedy sketch program Fast Forward parodied Prisoner; Gina Riley (Bea Smith), Jane Turner (Lizzie Birdsworth), Magda Szubanski (Doreen) and Marg Downey as officer (Joan Ferguson) gave scenes from the series a comedic twist.

Other series to have featured Prisoner spoofs included The Paul Hogan Show, Let the Blood Run Free, Naked Video and The Krypton Factor.

=== Prisoner-inspired shows ===
In 1991, Prisoner was reprised for the American market as Dangerous Women. The US version borrowed heavily from the Australian original for characters and was created and written by Reg Watson, who had also created the original Australian series. In Dangerous Women, the emphasis was outside the prison, focusing on prisoner relationships in a halfway house. In 1997, Prisoner was revised in a German-language version, Hinter Gittern – Der Frauenknast (Behind Bars). The series ran from 1997 to 2007 for 16 series and 403 episodes.

=== Talking Prisoner ===
On June 18, 2021, producer Matt Batten created the Talking Prisoner podcast and YouTube channel. Batten's co-host Ken Mulholland served as head cameraman on Prisoner from the series debut until episode 692. Mulholland and Batten interview cast and crew from Prisoner in depth. The podcast however also features interviews with cast and crew from other popular Australian internationally successful series like Sons and Daughters and Neighbours, and also featured interviews from staff at actual prisons including a 2023 interview with a warder from Ireland and a Prison Chaplin from San Quentin. In 2023 Mulholland departed the podcast to focus on his art and it was announced that filmmaker Tim Burns had joined as the new co-host of the podcast on occasion with Batten often hosting episodes alone.

== Merchandise ==
There have been several tie-in books and video and DVD releases. Prisoner's theme song ("On the Inside", sung by Lynne Hamilton) reached number four in Australia in 1979 and peaked at number three on the UK Singles Chart in 1989. "On the Inside" was re-released as a digital download and CD single in March 2012. The song was featured as a B-side on punkabilly group The Living End's EP, Second Solution / Prisoner of Society.

=== Books (tie-in publications) ===
==== Based on the Series ====
There have been numerous publications on the series, including tie-in paperback novels, including publication's by Pinnacle Books, which in 1980, led by the actors union the Media, Entertainment and Arts Alliance and represented by cast member Val Lehman (Bea Smith), which saw the cast go on strike due to the content in the United States: soft-core pornography at odds with the series. Six books were published: Prisoner: Cell Block H, The Franky Doyle Story, The Karen Travers Story, The Frustrations of Vera, The Reign of Queen Bea and The Trials of Erica.

Two behind-the-scenes books were published in the UK during the early 1990s. Prisoner: Cell Block H – Behind the Scenes was written by Terry Bourke and published by Angus & Robertson Publishers, who published similar books about soap operas Neighbours and Home and Away. Bourke documents the show's genesis and development, and the book has many stills and character profiles. Hilary Kingsley's Prisoner Cell Block H – The Inside Story emphasises more on plot and characters.

A limited-edition book, The Inside Story, was published in 2007 as part of the full-series DVD release in Australia. Written by TV journalists Andrew Mercado and Michael Idato, the commemorative book has the series' background, year-by-year storylines, character details and quotes by cast and crew. It was available as part of The Complete Collection DVD set.

==== Biographies and memoirs of cast members ====
There are also several published autobiographies, biographies and memoirs of cast members:, apart from these, Jane Clifton is a published author who was written several novels including fiction crime and also books of poetry

- Colette Mann published 2 books, It's a Mann's World in 1990 and Give Me a Break in 2002.
- Betty Bobbitt self-published From the Outside, in 2011, which are her memoirs of her career which included playing the role of Judy Bryant on Prisoner.
- Sheila Florance biography titled "On the Inside" was published in 2016 by Helen Martineau, which details her career as an actress and performer, including her role as Lizzie Birdsworth on Prisoner.
- Maggie Kirkpatrick, published her own autobiography in 2019, about her performing career, titled The Gloves Are Off, named after the iconic leather gloves that she occasionally wore as Joan Ferguson on Prisoner.

=== DVD releases ===
The complete series of Prisoner is available on DVD format in both Australia and the United Kingdom. On Region 4 in Australia, distribution company Shock Records released the series over forty volumes, and a complete collection, comprising these volumes; the UK editions, from FremantleMedia, made the series available over twenty volumes (doubling up on the Australian sets). In 2016, ViaVision acquired the rights to re-release the series in Australia and made the decision to release the series in their original season formats. See above for a full listing of VHS and DVD sets available. The following is an overview of Prisoner releases in their seasons formats. The use of the term 'season' is a recent phenomena, perhaps tied to DVD releases. During its original run, Prisoner was considered a continuing series. Continuous episode numbers (1–692) were used on production materials such as scripts and production schedules, rather than a 'season number / episode number' format.

DVD title	Episodes	Discs	Release date	Runtime (minutes)	ACB rating
DVD title	Episodes	Discs	Region 4	Runtime (minutes)	ACB rating
The Complete Season One	79	20	2 November 2016	3,555	M
The Complete Season Two	86	21	11 January 2017	3,949	M
The Complete Season Three	81	21	8 February 2017	3,596	M
The Complete Season Four	80	21	8 March 2017	3,600	M
The Complete Season Five	90	23	5 April 2017	4,001	M
The Complete Season Six	89	22	7 June 2017	4,001	M
The Complete Season Seven	83	21	2 August 2017	3,735	M
The Complete Season Eight	104	26	6 September 2017	4,680	M

=== Theatre and musicals ===
A stage version of Prisoner, based on the original scripts, was produced in 1989 and toured the United Kingdom. Elspeth Ballantyne (Meg Morris) and Patsy King (Erica Davidson) reprised their characters and Glenda Linscott (Rita Connors) played a new character, Angela Mason. A second tour, with Fiona Spence (Vera Bennett) and Jane Clifton (Margo Gaffney), followed in 1990; Jacqui Gordon (Susie Driscoll) played new character Kath Evans.

A musical version followed, with Maggie Kirkpatrick reprising her role as Joan (the Freak) Ferguson and Paul O'Grady (as Lily Savage) as an inmate. The musical, a parody of Prisoner's kitschier aspects, toured and had West End runs in 1995 and 1997. Val Lehman (Bea Smith) was critical of the production, questioning why a drag queen would be in a women's prison.

Due to Prisoner's popularity in the UK during the late 1980s, its British fan club organised personal-appearance tours for several actresses including Val Lehman (Bea Smith), Carol Burns (Franky Doyle), Betty Bobbitt (Judy Bryant), Sheila Florance (Lizzie Birdsworth), Amanda Muggleton (Chrissie Latham) and Judy McBurney (Pixie Mason). A TV special, The Great Escape, was produced in 1990. The programme, which featured Val Lehman, Sheila Florance, Amanda Muggleton and Carol Burns on their 1990 UK visit, includes extensive footage of their on-stage interview with TV presenter Anna Soubry in which the cast members discuss their time on the series. Recorded at the Derby Assembly Rooms in Derby, it was briefly available in the UK on VHS video.

Several Prisoner actors have appeared in British stage drama and pantomime, including Val Lehman (The Wizard of Oz, Beatrix Potter and Misery), Peta Toppano, Fiona Spence, Maggie Dence (Bev Baker), Debra Lawrance (Daphne Graham), Linda Hartley (Roach Waters), Ian Smith (Ted Douglas) and Maggie Millar (Marie Winter).

== Popular culture references ==
In 1997, a Prisoner clip from its second episode (Franky Doyle and Lynn Warner's fight in the garden) appeared on the BBC sitcom Birds of a Feather, and the series was mentioned several times during Birds of a Feather's seven-and-a-half-year run. The theme song was played briefly in episode three of BBC sitcom One Foot in the Grave. Prisoner has also been referenced in British sitcoms 2point4 Children, Absolutely Fabulous and Two Pints of Lager and a Packet of Crisps, as well as the soap operas Coronation Street, Brookside and EastEnders.

== International broadcast ==
=== United Kingdom ===
Prisoner was shown on the ITV network in the UK, but was not simulcast nationally. It began airing on Yorkshire Television on 8 October 1984. Some ITV stations cut some of the more violent scenes (including the attempted hanging of Sandy Edwards and the hanging of Eve Wilder). Some also heavily edited the episode 326 fight scene with Joan Ferguson and Bea Smith, despite its time slot which was well past the 9 p.m. watershed. Some regions (such as Granada in the North-West of England) did not start to show the series until 1988, while the Ulster region in Northern Ireland was the final region of the ITV network to start broadcasting the series, in 1989.

Border Television did not air some episodes, with a considerable gap in the middle of the run, resulting in viewers not seeing the conclusion of some storylines. To rectify this, the continuity announcer relayed the plots of the missed episodes. In a comical nod to the low-budget production values of the show, the announcer would also often refer to the programme as: '...the wobbly walls of Wentworth'.

When Border, Grampian and Granada TV screened the final episode in the UK in the mid-1990s, continuity announcer John McKenzie conducted a telephone interview with Maggie Kirkpatrick (Joan "the Freak" Ferguson).

Prisoner was part of Channel 5's schedule when it launched in 1997, with the series receiving a complete broadcast run until 2001. The series returned to the UK in September 2023 after 22 years when it was added to the channel's streaming service My5. It was also briefly aired from the beginning on 5Select from 20 December 2023, until 1 January 2024, ceasing broadcast at episode 20, but later resumed broadcast. From season 4, which began on 6 January 2025, it is aired on 5Select before streaming on My5. It is also currently airing from the beginning, as of 3 January 2024, on That's TV 2.

==== Channel 5 ====
Early on 31 March 1997 Channel 5, which had begun broadcasting at 6pm the previous evening, began a full run of Prisoner while later episodes were still appearing in a few ITV regions. Except for an airing of the fire episode (326), as part of a 1995 Channel 4 soap weekend, it was the series' first UK network broadcast and gave some areas their first full run of the series. Although the schedule varied during the Channel 5 run, episodes were typically shown about five times a week in the 4:40am slot. It briefly moved to a late-night slot, usually around 11:30pm, before returning to the 4:40am slot. The Channel 5 run ended on 11 February 2001, with a double bill of the penultimate and final episodes. Channel 5 have no plans to re-run the series, despite viewer requests. For most of the Channel 5 run the programme was sponsored by Pot Noodle, with humorous Prisoner-esque sequences (set in a prison cell and playing on the series' wobbly scenery and props) played before and after the episodes and in the leads into and out of commercial breaks.

The Channel 5 broadcasts included commentary over the closing credits, usually from chief continuity announcer Bill Buckley but sometimes from deputy announcers such as Stuart McWilliam. This began in the early-100s episodes (when Prisoner briefly moved to the late-night slot), when Buckley would deliver a quip about the episode before making continuity announcements. This developed into humorous observations about the episode just shown, and the reading of letters and depicting of trivia sent in by viewers (which Buckley called "snippets"). Due to its early-morning slot, when most viewers relied on VCRs to follow the series, upcoming schedule changes were announced as part of the commentary.

=== United States ===
The series was first aired in the United States on KTLA in Los Angeles on 8 August 1979, initially under the original name, Prisoner. The series, whose first two episodes were screened as a two-hour special, was viewed by a quarter of all television viewers in the Los Angeles market and was in second place for the night, beaten only by ABC's Charlie's Angels.

The series would later be repackaged into a daily half-hour format, as Prisoner: Cell Block H, KYW-TV ran this format under the title The Women of Cell Block H. It was syndicated directly to local stations through Firestone Program Syndication Company during the early 1980s (particularly 1980 to '81). In New York City, where Prisoner: Cell Block H was telecast on WPIX, it was rated higher than late-night staple The Tonight Show Starring Johnny Carson on WNBC and reruns of legendary series M*A*S*H on WNEW-TV, and paved the way for other popular Australian-produced shows including miniseries Against the Wind and serial The Sullivans to be sold to international markets.

Under the half-hour format, the original episodes were broadcast in two parts, though some scenes were censored or removed for the US telecast.

KTLA, however, continued to broadcast the series in a weekly hour format, though now Tuesdays at 8 p.m., and under the Prisoner: Cell Block H name. Picked up in at least 38 markets in early 1980, the program would leave the American airwaves by spring 1982, after the few stations that were still carrying the program, such as KOB-TV and WGN-TV, removed Prisoner from their schedules.

During the spring and summer of 1985, the series was screened nationally on USA Network, weekdays at 11 a.m. ET, also in a half-hour format. It is unknown which episodes were televised.

=== Canada ===
In Canada, Prisoner began on 10 September 1979 as Caged Women on Global Television Network, at the time a small television network serving southern and eastern Ontario; the program was seen weekly on Monday nights at 9 p.m.

The show would move to Tuesdays at 9 p.m. in the fall of 1980, continuing with the Caged Women title. The show would be off the schedule by the 1981–1982 television season, but by the fall of 1982, Global would reintroduce the show to the schedule, still as Caged Women, in the half-hour format, weeknights at midnight and 12:30 a.m. The program would be off the schedule by the start of the 1983–1984 season.

Curiously, Global's use of Caged Women would continue even after the show debuted in the United States as Prisoner: Cell Block H, which led to viewers in the communities along the Ontario / Michigan border to watch the same program under two different titles: Caged Women on Global, and Prisoner: Cell Block H on WKBD-TV Detroit.

In Vancouver, Victoria and the Lower Mainland of British Columbia, Prisoner: Cell Block H was telecast under that title weekdays at 1 p.m. during 1980 and 1981 on KVOS-TV, an independent station in Bellingham, Washington that included the greater Vancouver / Victoria region as part of its viewing area.

=== Sweden ===
The series was shown in Sweden where it was a cult broadcast on TV4, from 7 September 1994 and entitled Kvinnofängelset (The Women's Prison). A fan club organised a regular get together and collected several thousands of signatures from fans to repeat the series in again, which TV4 did so in 2000, After the series ended that year, work began to persuade the network to repeat the series a third time. The network originally screened the series three times a week (Tuesday, Thursday and Saturday) in the late night program slot of 1 a.m., with the final episode airing on 3 February 2000.

During the repeat run from 2000 until October 2004, the network screening was four times a week (Monday to Thursday) at 2:15 a.m. The episodes were then repeated on weekends with both the Monday and Tuesday episode on Saturday and the Wednesday and Thursday episodes on Sunday.

The second rerun began in May 2014, by station TV4 Guld and again airing Monday through to Thursdays, and screening at 10:00 p.m., with episode 32 on July 3.

The broadcast schedule was later changed to five nights a week airing at midnight. Season 8 began broadcasting Sjuan in September 2017 at 3:00 p.m.

=== Other countries ===
In New Zealand, Prisoner was first shown on TV2 on Monday 2 March 1981 and aired up to four afternoons a week, Monday to Thursday, at 2:30 p.m. before moving to twice a week, Mondays and Tuesdays, in the same timeslot by October 1985. On Monday 9 February 1987, the series was moved to TV One and continued to air Mondays and Tuesdays at around 2:30 p.m. until Thursday 23 July 1987 when it aired only on Thursdays in that slot. The final episode of Prisoner was broadcast on Friday 16 September 1988 at 2:35 p.m. The series was rerun on Orange and, later, Sky 1.

In South Africa, public television network SABC 1 began airing the series in 1998, screening Thursday nights at 9 p.m. and a repeat showing on Fridays at 10:45; it was cancelled on 2 October 2000, after episode 156.

In Brazil, Prisoner aired as As Prisioneiras around the end of 1980 and early 1981 by TVS (since renamed SBT). The show was dubbed into Brazilian Portuguese locally by TVS and was cancelled after episode 82 had aired. The series was aired again on TV Corcovado (now CNT Rio de Janeiro) in 1987.

== Australian reruns ==
After Network Ten in Sydney, NSW had played the original run of the series, it returned in syndication for a second complete series rerun during weeknights around 10:30–11:00 p.m. during most of the year of 1990 though due to The Gulf War conflict coverage the reruns were abruptly rescheduled weekday mornings from 4 a.m. through to the series finale a few years later. The series was replayed for a third time during the mid-1990s on Channel Ten in Sydney, NSW now screening at weekday afternoons from 1 p.m. and then later at 1:30 p.m. The series has not been seen since on its original commercial Channel Ten since that period. Network Ten began rerunning Prisoner on 8 May 1995; the series was cancelled, despite promises that it would return after the 1996 Christmas break. BBC UKTV began airing it from the beginning on 30 November 1997, at 12:15 a.m. on Tuesday and Thursday and 11:30 p.m. on Saturday and Sunday. A repeat was broadcast at 2 p.m. on Monday. From March 2022, the show is available for streaming at 10play.

Foxtel channel 111 channel began airing the series on 7 March 2011 at 6:30 p.m. AEDT, later moving to 5:30 p.m. AEDT on 10 December 2012. Each episode was repeated the following afternoon, with the final episode on the initial run airing on 11 November 2013. The next day, the channel began a repeat run from episode one at 3:00 p.m. AEDT, later moving to 1:00 p.m. AEST on 7 July 2014. Foxtel held unlimited screening rights to the series until 2019, airing the series 4 times back to back (from 2011 to 2019). Foxtel's final broadcast was on September 11, 2019.

The series' popularity on Foxtel inspired plans for a modern-day remake.

Believing that Prisoner would resonate with new audiences, in 2010 111 group programming director Darren Chau planned to replay the series against the introduction of digital channel Eleven and Network Ten's plan to move Neighbours to Eleven. The channel ran a promotional campaign highlighting the rerun, with a new version of the theme song by Ella Hooper and a cast reunion.

As of 2023, Prisoner was available on the streaming channel 10Play in Australia and is also available on Pluto TV 24 hours a day with back-to-back episodes streaming.

== Awards and nominations ==
Organisation	Category	Year	Recipient	Results	Ref.
Logie Awards	Best Lead Actress in a Series	1980	Carol Burns	Won	
Logie Awards	Best New Drama Series	1980	Prisoner	Won	
Logie Awards	Best Lead Actress in a Series	1981	Sheila Florance	Won	
Logie Awards	Best Drama Program	1981	Prisoner	Won	
Logie Awards	Most Popular Actress	1982	Val Lehman	Won	
Logie Awards	Best Lead Actress in a Series	1982	Val Lehman	Won	
Logie Awards	Best Drama Program	1982	Prisoner	Won	
Logie Awards	Best Lead Actress in a Series	1983	Val Lehman	Won	
Logie Awards	Best Supporting Actress in a Series	1983	Sheila Florance	Won	
Logie Awards	Best Supporting Actress in a Series	1981	Colette Mann	Nominated	
Logie Awards	Best Supporting Actor in a Series	1981	Gerard Maguire	Nominated	
Logie Awards	Best Lead Actress in a Series	1982	Betty Bobbitt	Nominated	
Logie Awards	Best Lead Actress in a Series	1984	Maggie Kirkpatrick	Nominated	
Logie Awards	Best Supporting Actress in a Series	1985	Gerda Nicolson	Nominated	
Logie Awards	Best Performance by a Juvenile	1985	Robert Summers	Nominated	
Logie Awards	Most Popular Actress in a Series	1986	Maggie Kirkpatrick	Nominated	
Penguin Awards	Best Sustained Performance by an Actress in a Series	1979	Carol Burns	Won	
Penguin Awards	Special Commendation Outstanding Ensemble Acting	1981	Ensemble cast Val Lehman, Sheila Florance, Colette Mann and Betty Bobbitt	Won	
Penguin Awards	Best Actress in a Supporting Role in a Series	1984	Anne Phelan	Won	
Penguin Awards	Best Series Actress	1985	Anne Phelan	Won	
Penguin Awards	Best Sustained Performance	1985	Gerda Nicolson	Won	
Penguin Awards	Certificate of Commendation	1985	Maggie Kirkpatrick	Won	
Penguin Awards	Certificate of Commendation	1985	Genevieve Lemon	Won	
Penguin Awards	Certificate of Commendation	1985	Joy Westmore	Won	
Penguin Awards	Best Drama Serial	1986	Prisoner	Won	
Penguin Awards	Best Performance by an Actress in a Series	1986	Glenda Linscott	Won	
Sammy Awards	Best Actress in a Series	1980	Sheila Florance	Won	

== See also ==
- Bad Girls
- Orange Is the New Black
