= Anne Lucas =

Australian actress

- Born: Mary Anne Elizabeth Lucas c. July 1946 (age 80); Johor, Malaysia
- Occupations: Actress, television screenwriter/script editor
- Known for: •
- Notable work: Screenwriter - "Prisoner" (TV series)
- Spouse: Ian Bradley (m. 1977)
- Children: 2

Mary Anne Elizabeth Lucas (born c. July 1946) billed also as Annie Lucas, is an Australian actress and TV screenwriter and script editor, her roles on television including The Young Doctors from 1977 to 1980 as Eve Turner (Steele) and in Prisoner for two stints in 1982 and 1983 as prison bookie Faye Quinn. She is also a screenwriter and wrote episodes for "Prisoner". Her television screenplays have been nominated for awards on multiple occasions.

== Personal life ==
Lucas was born in July 1946 in Johor, Malaysia to a father of half Burmese and Irish descent and a mother of half Malay and English descent

She is married to English-Australian Prisoner producer Ian Bradley (born Bath, Somerset, England, c. 1944), Bradley was the original producer during season 1 They have a son, Lucas (b. 1980). and a daughter, Kate b. 1985.

== Career ==
=== Actress and screenwriting ===
Lucas roles include character cameos in Skippy (the Bush Kangaroo)

She is most notable roles are The Young Doctors from 1977 and 1979 and in cult series Prisoner as prison bookie Faye Quinn, she also wrote many episodes of Prisoner, the first season of which was produced by her husband Ian Bradley. Due to her marriage to Bradley, in 1979, it was her idea to open the programme with mugshots of the prisoners, instead of a typical opening title sequence. Lucas also wrote seven episodes of Prisoner between 1979 and 1983, including episode 327, including the story-arc of the fire of Wentworth, which was the first episode of the 1983 season. It is now widely regarded as one of the best episodes of the entire series, and was included on the DVD compilation, Best of Prisoner: Cell Block H Volume 1 (Shock DVD).

Her screenwriting credits include the medical drama's The Flying Doctors and All Saints (in which she also featured)

She appeared in the local ABC series Belbird as Glenda Chan also appeared in early Crawford Production serials including Homicide, Division 4, Matlock Police and Spyforce

Most recently in her television writing career she worked as a script editor for Channel 7's HeadLand.

== Filmography ==
Production	Year	Role	Type
Bellbird	1967	Glenda Chan	TV series, 67 episodes
Hunter	1969	Lai- Lan	TV series, 1 episode: "Deep Water"
Skippy the Bush Kangaroo	1969	Shopper (uncredited)	TV series, 1 episode: "Surprise! Surprise!"
Homicide	1967-1971	Sandra Miler / Fran Manning / Patti Pryor / Ann Young / Cheryl/Judy Bryant / Anita Arruza	TV series, 6 episodes: "No Through Road", "The Fourth Side", "Dead or Alive", "The Beach Boys", "As the Twig Is Bent", "David's Diary"
Matlock Police	1971	Esther Jenkins	TV series, 1 episode: "Olsen's Ghost"
Dynasty	1971	Marta	TV series, 1 episode "Man in the Middle"
Division 4	1969-1972	Narelle Stevens / Robyn Nicholls / Maisie	TV series, 3 episodes: "Night Out", 'The Web", "Trap for Young Players"
Spyforce	1971-1973	Elizabeth / Stephanie	TV series, 2 episode: "The Tunku", "The Roles That Went to War"
Cop Shop	1979	Louise Renkin	TV series, 2 episodes
The Young Doctors	1977-1979	Eve Turner	TV series
Prisoner	1982-1983	Faye Quinn	TV series, seasons 4 & 5, 22 episodes
The Great Bookie Robbery	1986	Angélique	TV miniseries
Embassy	1992	Madame Wu	TV series
All Saints	1999-2004	Mrs. Goh / Dr. Carol Wong	TV series, 4 episodes: "Getting to Know You", "Dependence Day", "The Devil to Pay", "Luck of the Draw"

== Screenwriter ==
Production	Year	Role	Type
Holiday Island	1981	Writer	TV series, 1 episode: "Cyclone"
The Voyage of George Raft	1982	Writer	Documentary
Prisoner	1979-1983	Writer	TV series, 7 episodes
Skin Deep	1984	Screenwriter	TV movie
The Flying Doctors	1989-1990	Writer	TV series, 2 episodes: "Dad's Little Bloke", "Bitter Harvest"
Embassy	1990	Story Editor	TV series, 1 episode: "Displaced Persons"
All Saints	1998	Writer	TV series, 1 episode: "Moment of Truth"
Close Contact	1999	Screenwriter	TV movie
headLand	2005	Writer	TV series, 1 episode

== Script Editor ==
Production	Year	Role	Type
Prisoner	1979-1980	Script Editor	TV series, 65 episodes
Colour in the Creek	1985	Script Editor	TV series, 8 episodes -"The Great Depression" -"All the Family's Money Has Gone" -"Alec Enjoy's the Flight of a Lifetime" -"The Fletcher Family Set Up Life at Corrumbong Creek" -"Hypnotised" -"Return to Corumbong Creek" -"Gold Fever" -Code of Silence"
The Flying Doctors	1989	Script Editor	TV series, 2 episodes -"Bitter Harvest" -"Sky Below"
