= List of Prisoner episodes =

Prisoner (known internationally as Prisoner: Cell Block H and Caged Women) is an Australian soap opera created by Reg Watson, and was produced by the Reg Grundy Organisation for Network Ten. The series was set primarily within the fictional Wentworth Detention Centre, and filmed at Network Ten Studios Melbourne, located in the suburb of Nunawading.

During the course of the series, 692 episodes of Prisoner aired over eight seasons, between 27 February 1979 and 11 December 1986.

The airdates listed below are the correct run of episodes per season as shown on ATV0/10 Australia in Melbourne, the series' regional network. Airdates for episodes varied in other Australian states.

== Series overview ==
Season	Episodes	Originally released	
Season	Episodes	First released	Last released
1	79	27 February 1979	28 November 1979
2	86	22 January 1980	12 November 1980
3	81	4 February 1981	11 November 1981
4	80	9 February 1982	9 November 1982
5	90	1 February 1983	3 November 1983
6	89	17 January 1984	8 November 1984
7	83	24 January 1985	5 November 1985
8	104	9 January 1986	11 December 1986

== Episodes ==
=== Season 1 (1979) ===
No. overall	Episode	Directed by	Written by	Original release date
1	Episode 1 Episode 2	Graeme Arthur	Reg Watson	27 February 1979
2	Episode 1 Episode 2	Graeme Arthur	Reg Watson	27 February 1979
3	Episode 3	Rod Hardy	Ian Bradley	28 February 1979
4	Episode 4	Graeme Arthur	Ian Bradley	6 March 1979
5	Episode 5	Rod Hardy	Reg Watson	7 March 1979
6	Episode 6	Graeme Arthur	Denise Morgan	13 March 1979
7	Episode 7	Gary Conway	Denise Morgan	14 March 1979
8	Episode 8	Brian McDuffie	Ian Coughlan	20 March 1979
9	Episode 9	Gary Conway	Ian Bradley	21 March 1979
10	Episode 10	Graeme Arthur	Ian Coughlan	27 March 1979
11	Episode 11	Gary Conway	Denise Morgan	28 March 1979
12	Episode 12	Brian McDuffie	Michael Brindley	3 April 1979
13	Episode 13	Godfrey Philipp	Michael Brindley	4 April 1979
14	Episode 14	Godfrey Philipp	Michael Brindley	10 April 1979
15	Episode 15	Gary Conway	Denise Morgan	11 April 1979
16	Episode 16	Gary Conway	Marcus Cole	17 April 1979
17	Episode 17	Simon Wincer	Dave Worthington & Marcus Cole	18 April 1979
18	Episode 18	Simon Wincer	Denise Morgan	24 April 1979
19	Episode 19	William Fitzwater	Jill Kavalek	25 April 1979
20	Episode 20	William Fitzwater	Denise Morgan	1 May 1979
21	Episode 21	Marcus Cole & Charles Tingwell	Marcus Cole	2 May 1979
22	Episode 22	Marcus Cole & Charles Tingwell	Michael Brindley	8 May 1979
23	Episode 23	Julian Pringle	Maree Teychenne	9 May 1979
24	Episode 24	Julian Pringle	Ron McLean	15 May 1979
25	Episode 25	Alan Coleman	Stanley Walsh	16 May 1979
26	Episode 26	Alan Coleman	Sarah Darling	22 May 1979
27	Episode 27	William Fitzwater	Denise Morgan	23 May 1979
28	Episode 28	William Fitzwater	Dave Worthington & Ian Bradley	29 May 1979
29	Episode 29	Marcus Cole	Michael Brindley	30 May 1979
30	Episode 30	Marcus Cole	Sheila Sibley	5 June 1979
31	Episode 31	Julian Pringle	Denise Morgan	6 June 1979
32	Episode 32	Julian Pringle	John Drew	12 June 1979
33	Episode 33	Peita Letchford	Ray Kolle	12 June 1979
34	Episode 34	Peita Letchford	Sheila Sibley	19 June 1979
35	Episode 35	Leigh Spence	Michael Brindley	20 June 1979
36	Episode 36	Leigh Spence	Denise Morgan	26 June 1979
37	Episode 37	Marcus Cole	John Drew	27 June 1979
38	Episode 38	Marcus Cole	Sheila Sibley	3 July 1979
39	Episode 39	Brian Faull	Ron McLean	4 July 1979
40	Episode 40	Brian Faull	Denise Morgan	10 July 1979
41	Episode 41	Leon Thau	John Hepworth	11 July 1979
42	Episode 42	Leon Thau	Maree Teychenne	17 July 1979
43	Episode 43	Leigh Spence	Denise Morgan	18 July 1979
44	Episode 44	Leigh Spence	Dave Worthington & Ian Bradley	24 July 1979
45	Episode 45	Marcus Cole	Michael Brindley	25 July 1979
46	Episode 46	Marcus Cole	John Drew	31 July 1979
47	Episode 47	Philip East	John Upton	1 August 1979
48	Episode 48	Philip East	S. E. Unsworth	7 August 1979
49	Episode 49	Leon Thau & Philip East	Denise Morgan	8 August 1979
50	Episode 50	Leon Thau & Philip East	John Wood	14 August 1979
51	Episode 51	Leigh Spence	John Upton	15 August 1979
52	Episode 52	Leigh Spence	Sheila Sibley	21 August 1979
53	Episode 53	Marcus Cole	Ray Kolle	22 August 1979
54	Episode 54	Marcus Cole	Denise Morgan	28 August 1979
55	Episode 55	Simon Hellings	Margaret McClusky	29 August 1979
56	Episode 56	Simon Hellings	Anne Lucas & John Wregg	4 September 1979
57	Episode 57	Philip East	John Wood	5 September 1979
58	Episode 58	Philip East	Dave Worthington	11 September 1979
59	Episode 59	Leigh Spence	Denise Morgan	12 September 1979
60	Episode 60	Leigh Spence	Michael Brindley	18 September 1979
61	Episode 61	Marcus Cole	Ian Bradley & Anne Lucas	19 September 1979
62	Episode 62	Marcus Cole	Margaret McClusky	25 September 1979
63	Episode 63	Leon Thau	Denise Morgan	26 September 1979
64	Episode 64	Leon Thau	Sheila Sibley	2 October 1979
65	Episode 65	Philip East	John Upton	3 October 1979
66	Episode 66	Simon Hellings	Dave Worthington	16 October 1979
67	Episode 67	Leigh Spence	Denise Morgan	17 October 1979
68	Episode 68	Leigh Spence	Ray Kolle	23 October 1979
69	Episode 69	Marcus Cole	John Wood	24 October 1979
70	Episode 70	Marcus Cole	John Wregg & Eric Scott	30 October 1979
71	Episode 71	Leigh Spence	Margaret McClusky	31 October 1979
72	Episode 72	Leigh Spence	Denise Morgan	6 November 1979
73	Episode 73	Philip East	Sheila Sibley	7 November 1979
74	Episode 74	Philip East	Ray Kolle	13 November 1979
75	Episode 75	Kelvin Fogarty	Denise Morgan	14 November 1979
76	Episode 76	Kelvin Fogarty	John Wood	20 November 1979
77	Episode 77	Marcus Cole	John Wregg & Ian Bradley	21 November 1979
78	Episode 78	Marcus Cole	Margaret McClusky	27 November 1979
79	Episode 79	Leigh Spence	Michael Harvey	28 November 1979

=== Season 2 (1980) ===
No. overall	Episode	Directed by	Written by	Original release date
80	Episode 1	Leigh Spence	John Upton	22 January 1980
81	Episode 2	Philip East	Ray Kolle	23 January 1980
82	Episode 3	Philip East	Dave Worthington	29 January 1980
83	Episode 4	Julian Pringle	Sheila Sibley	30 January 1980
84	Episode 5	Julian Pringle	Denise Morgan	5 February 1980
85	Episode 6	Rod Hardy	John Wood	6 February 1980
86	Episode 7	Ron Hardy	Margaret McClusky	12 February 1980
87	Episode 8	Marcus Cole	Marcus Cole	13 February 1980
88	Episode 9	Marcus Cole	Ian Bradley & Anne Lucas	19 February 1980
89	Episode 10	Leigh Spence	John Upton	20 February 1980
90	Episode 11	Leigh Spence	Ray Kolle	26 February 1980
91	Episode 12	Simon Wincer	George Mallaby	27 February 1980
92	Episode 13	Simon Wincer	Dave Worthington	4 March 1980
93	Episode 14	Marcus Cole	Sheila Sibley	5 March 1980
94	Episode 15	Marcus Cole	John Upton	11 March 1980
95	Episode 16	Gary Conway	Denise Morgan	12 March 1980
96	Episode 17	Gary Conway	John Wood	18 March 1980
97	Episode 18	Leigh Spence	George Mallaby	19 March 1980
98	Episode 19	Leigh Spence & Michael Pattinson	Margaret McClusky	25 March 1980
99	Episode 20	Rod Hardy	Dave Wothington	26 March 1980
100	Episode 21	Ron Hardy	Ian Bradley	1 April 1980
101	Episode 22	Marcus Cole	Denise Morgan	2 April 1980
102	Episode 23	Marcus Cole	Ray Kolle	8 April 1980
103	Episode 24	Gary Conway	John Upton	9 April 1980
104	Episode 25	Gary Conway	George Mallaby	15 April 1980
105	Episode 26	Leigh Spence	Margaret McClusky	16 April 1980
106	Episode 27	Leigh Spence	Denise Morgan	22 April 1980
107	Episode 28	Rod Hardy	Sheila Sibley	23 April 1980
108	Episode 29	Ron Hardy	Dave Worthington	29 April 1980
109	Episode 30	Marcus Cole	Marcus Cooney	30 April 1980
110	Episode 31	Marcus Cole	Ian Bradley & David Worthington	6 May 1980
111	Episode 32	Gary Conway	Denise Morgan	7 May 1980
112	Episode 33	Gary Conway	John Wood	13 May 1980
113	Episode 34	Leigh Spence	Ray Kolle	14 May 1980
114	Episode 35	Leigh Spence	Bryon Williams & Chris Milne	20 May 1980
115	Episode 36	Michael Pattinson	John Upton	21 May 1980
116	Episode 37	Michael Pattinson	Denise Morgan	27 May 1980
117	Episode 38	Bill Hughes	Margaret McClusky	28 May 1980
118	Episode 39	Bill Hughes	George Mallaby	3 June 1980
119	Episode 40	Marcus Cole	Sheila Sibley	4 June 1980
120	Episode 41	Marcus Cole	Dave Wothington	10 June 1980
121	Episode 42	Leigh Spence	Denise Morgan	11 June 1980
122	Episode 43	Leigh Spence	John Wood	17 June 1980
123	Episode 44	Michael Pattinson	John Upton	18 June 1980
124	Episode 45	Michael Pattinson	Ray Kolle	24 June 1980
125	Episode 46	Bill Hughes	Denise Morgan	25 June 1980
126	Episode 47	Bill Hughes	Barbara Ramsay & Margaret McClusky	1 July 1980
127	Episode 48	Marcus Cole	Bryon Williams	2 July 1980
128	Episode 49	Marcus Cole	George Mallaby	8 July 1980
129	Episode 50	Leigh Spence	Dave Worthington	9 July 1980
130	Episode 51	Leigh Spence	Sheila Sibley	15 July 1980
131	Episode 52	Michael Pattinson	Denise Morgan	16 July 1980
132	Episode 53	Michael Pattinson	Margaret McClusky	22 July 1980
133	Episode 54	Bill Hughes	John Upton	23 July 1980
134	Episode 55	Bill Hughes	George Mallaby	29 July 1980
135	Episode 56	Rod Hardy	Ray Kolle	30 July 1980
136	Episode 57	Ron Hardy	Denise Morgan	5 August 1980
137	Episode 58	Leigh Spence	Sheila Sibley	6 August 1980
138	Episode 59	Leigh Spence	Margaret McClusky	12 August 1980
139	Episode 60	Michael Pattinson	Denise Morgan	13 August 1980
140	Episode 61	Michael Pattinson	John Wood	19 August 1980
141	Episode 62	John McRae	George Mallaby	20 August 1980
142	Episode 63	John McRae	Dave Worthington	26 August 1980
143	Episode 64	Rod Hardy	Denise Morgan	27 August 1980
144	Episode 65	Ron Hardy	Barbara Ramsay	2 September 1980
145	Episode 66	Mike Murphy	John Upton	3 September 1980
146	Episode 67	Mike Murphy	Bryon Williams	9 September 1980
147	Episode 68	Michael Pattinson	Sheila Sibley	10 September 1980
148	Episode 69	Michael Pattinson	Margaret McClusky	16 September 1980
149	Episode 70	John McRae	Denise Morgan	17 September 1980
150	Episode 71	John McRae	George Mallaby	23 September 1980
151	Episode 72	Rod Hardy & Juliana Focht	John Wood	24 September 1980
152	Episode 73	Rod Hardy & Juliana Focht	Coral Drouyn & Alistair Sharp	30 September 1980
153	Episode 74	Leigh Spence	John Upton	1 October 1980
154	Episode 75	Leigh Spence	Dave Worthington	7 October 1980
155	Episode 76	Mike Murphy	Denise Morgan	8 October 1980
156	Episode 77	Mike Murphy	Barbara Ramsay	14 October 1980
157	Episode 78	Rod Hardy & Juliana Focht	Margaret McClusky	15 October 1980
158	Episode 79	Rod Hardy & Juliana Focht	George Mallaby	21 October 1980
159	Episode 80	Rod Hardy & Juliana Focht	Denise Morgan	22 October 1980
160	Episode 81	Kendal Flanagan	Ray Kolle	28 October 1980
161	Episode 82	Kendal Flanagan	John Upton	29 October 1980
162	Episode 83	Leigh Spence	John Wood	4 November 1980
163	Episode 84	Leigh Spence	Ian Bradley	5 November 1980
164	Episode 85	Mike Murphy	Denise Morgan	11 November 1980
165	Episode 86	Rod Hardy & Juliana Focht	Dave Worthington	12 November 1980

=== Season 3 (1981) ===
No. overall	Episode	Directed by	Written by	Original release date
166	Episode 1	Alistair Sharp	Rod Hardy & Juliana Focht	4 February 1981
167	Episode 2	Denise Morgan	John McRae	10 February 1981
168	Episode 3	Margaret McClusky	John McRae	11 February 1981
169	Episode 4	Ray Kolle	Leigh Spence	17 February 1981
170	Episode 5	George Mallaby	Leigh Spence	18 February 1981
171	Episode 6	Denise Morgan	Mike Murphy	24 February 1981
172	Episode 7	Alastair Sharp	Mike Murphy	25 February 1981
173	Episode 8	Dave Worthington	Juliana Focht	3 March 1981
174	Episode 9	Bryon Williams	Juliana Focht	4 March 1981
175	Episode 10	Denise Morgan	Leigh Spence	10 March 1981
176	Episode 11	Margaret McClusky	Leigh Spence	11 March 1981
177	Episode 12	Ian Bradley	Mike Murphy	17 March 1981
178	Episode 13	Barbara Ramsay	Mike Murphy	18 March 1981
179	Episode 14	Ray Kolle	Marcus Cole	24 March 1981
180	Episode 15	Dave Worthington	Marcus Cole	25 March 1981
181	Episode 16	Denise Morgan	Juliana Focht	31 March 1981
182	Episode 17	George Mallaby	Juliana Focht	1 April 1981
183	Episode 18	Bryon Williams	Leigh Spence	7 April 1981
184	Episode 19	Margaret McClusky	Leigh Spence	8 April 1981
185	Episode 20	Denise Morgan	Mike Murphy	14 April 1981
186	Episode 21	Barbara Ramsay	Mike Murphy	15 April 1981
187	Episode 22	Alastair Sharp	John McRae	21 April 1981
188	Episode 23	Ian Bradley	John McRae	22 April 1981
189	Episode 24	Dave Worthington	Juliana Focht	28 April 1981
190	Episode 25	Ray Kolle	Juliana Focht	29 April 1981
191	Episode 26	Denise Morgan	Leigh Spence	5 May 1981
192	Episode 27	George Mallaby	Leigh Spence	6 May 1981
193	Episode 28	Margaret McClusky	Geoffrey Nottage	12 May 1981
194	Episode 29	Bryon Williams	Geoffrey Nottage	13 May 1981
195	Episode 30	Denise Morgan	Marcus Cole	19 May 1981
196	Episode 31	Barbara Ramsay	Marcus Cole	20 May 1981
197	Episode 32	Dave Worthington	Juliana Focht	26 May 1981
198	Episode 33	Ray Kolle	Juliana Focht	27 May 1981
199	Episode 34	John Harper	Leigh Spence	2 June 1981
200	Episode 35	Denise Morgan	Leigh Spence	3 June 1981
201	Episode 36	Peter Brennan	Geoffrey Nottage	9 June 1981
202	Episode 37	Bryon Williams	Geoffrey Nottage	10 June 1981
203	Episode 38	Ian Bradley	Marcus Cole	16 June 1981
204	Episode 39	Margaret McClusky	Marcus Cole	17 June 1981
205	Episode 40	Barbara Ramsay	Juliana Focht	23 June 1981
206	Episode 41	Ray Kolle	Juliana Focht	24 June 1981
207	Episode 42	Dave Worthington	Leigh Spence	30 June 1981
208	Episode 43	Alastair Sharp	Leigh Spence	1 July 1981
209	Episode 44	David Minter & Margaret McClusky	John McRae	7 July 1981
210	Episode 45	Bryon Williams	John McRae	8 July 1981
211	Episode 46	Peter Brennan	Kendal Flanagan	14 July 1981
212	Episode 47	David Stevens	Kendal Flanagan	15 July 1981
213	Episode 48	Ray Kolle	Juliana Focht	21 July 1981
214	Episode 49	Barbara Ramsay	Juliana Focht	28 July 1981
215	Episode 50	Dave Worthington	Leigh Spence	4 August 1981
216	Episode 51	Alastair Sharp	Leigh Spence	5 August 1981
217	Episode 52	Bryon Williams	John McRae	11 August 1981
218	Episode 53	Denise Morgan	John McRae	12 August 1981
219	Episode 54	Margaret McClusky	Kendal Flanagan	18 August 1981
220	Episode 55	Peter Brennan & Coral Drouyn	Kendal Flanagan	19 August 1981
221	Episode 56	Barbara Ramsay	Juliana Focht	25 August 1981
222	Episode 57	Ray Kolle	Juliana Focht	26 August 1981
223	Episode 58	Alastair Sharp	Wayne Cameron	1 September 1981
224	Episode 59	Dave Worthington	Wayne Cameron	2 September 1981
225	Episode 60	Bryon Williams	Gary Conway	8 September 1981
226	Episode 61	Denise Morgan	Gary Conway	9 September 1981
227	Episode 62	Margaret McClusky	Kendal Flanagan	15 September 1981
228	Episode 63	Coral Drouyn	Kendal Flanagan	16 September 1981
229	Episode 64	Peter Brennan & Wendy Jackson	Juliana Focht	22 September 1981
230	Episode 65	Ray Kolle	Juliana Focht	23 September 1981
231	Episode 66	Ian Bradley	Wayne Cameron	23 September 1981
232	Episode 67	Barbara Ramsay	Wayne Cameron	29 September 1981
233	Episode 68	Dave Worthington	Lex Van Os	30 September 1981
234	Episode 69	Christine McCourt	Lex Van Os	30 September 1981
235	Episode 70	Alastair Sharp	Rod Hardy	6 October 1981
236	Episode 71	Bryon Williams	Rod Hardy	7 October 1981
237	Episode 72	Denise Morgan	Greg Shears	13 October 1981
238	Episode 73	Margaret McClusky	Greg Shears	14 October 1981
239	Episode 74	Coral Drouyn	Leigh Spence	20 October 1981
240	Episode 75	Ian Bradley	Leigh Spence	21 October 1981
241	Episode 76	Ray Kolle	Lex Van Os	27 October 1981
242	Episode 77	Wendy Jackson	Lex Van Os	28 October 1981
243	Episode 78	Michael Freundt & Andrew Kennedy	Kendal Flanagan	3 November 1981
244	Episode 79	Barbara Ramsay	Kendal Flanagan	4 November 1981
245	Episode 80	Rick Maier	Juliana Focht	10 November 1981
246	Episode 81	Dave Worthington	Juliana Focht	11 November 1981

=== Season 4 (1982) ===
No. overall	Episode	Directed by	Written by	Original release date
247	Episode 1	Ian Bradley	Leigh Spence	9 February 1982
The women take over Wentworth. Meg and Jim make it to safety, while Janet and Steve remain trapped in the building.
248	Episode 2	Bryon Williams	Leigh Spence	10 February 1982
Lizzie is dragged away from the riot and taken to court. Jim breaks into Wentworth. The police storm the prison with tear gas when the women refuse to back down.
249	Episode 3	John Mortimore	John Duncan	16 February 1982
Marie attempts to escape under the guise of an officer. Janet adapts a new, bitter attitude towards the women. Lizzie's trial begins. Marie announces that she has taken over as Top Dog.
250	Episode 4	Coral Drouyn	John Duncan	17 February 1982
Lizzie is acquitted of arson. Sandy faces the Visiting Justice for her leadership in the riot. Bea discovers some unsettling news about Kate, before being released from hospital. A new security measure is set, much to Meg's anger. Sandy and Steve grown closer to one another. Marie's drugs association with Fitzwater gets underway in the prison.
251	Episode 5	Dave Worthington	Kendal Flanagan	23 February 1982
With tensions in the prison about to reach crisis point, the staff make the decision to strike. Judy receives some promising new about her upcoming parole hearing. Lizzie’s is taken in by a conman. Jim becomes frustrated with Janet’s obsessive behaviour. Is Kate’s secret about to be exposed?
252	Episode 6	Ray Kolle	Kendal Flanagan	24 February 1982
A furious Janet thinks that Jim and Meg are having an affair. The prisoners are pleased when the relaxing of security restrictions take effect. Judy realises that she may not be able to attend her daughter’s wedding. Lizzie's newfound freedom is short-lived. The women become suspicious that they may have lagger among them. Bea and Sandy are determined to bring about the end Marie's drug racket at Wentworth.
253	Episode 7	Wendy Jackson	Juliana Focht	2 March 1982
The women confront Bea and Sandy over Marie's set up, despite having no proof. Janet makes amends with Meg and attempts to continue her relationship with Jim. Judy continues to fret as her parole hearing draws near. Lizzie returns to Wentworth, as does Doreen, who is badly injured and it becomes obvious that she is hiding something. The prisoners are up in arms over the arrival of a pair of guard dogs.
254	Episode 8	Barbara Ramsay	Juliana Focht	3 March 1982
255	Episode 9	Ian Bradley	John Gauci	9 March 1982
256	Episode 10	John Mortimore	John Gauci	10 March 1982
257	Episode 11	Coral Drouyn	Lex Van Os	16 March 1982
258	Episode 12	Dave Worthington	Lex Van Os	17 March 1982
259	Episode 13	Ray Kolle	Kendal Flanagan	23 March 1982
260	Episode 14	Bryon Williams	Kendal Flanagan	24 March 1982
261	Episode 15	Wendy Jackson	Juliana Focht	30 March 1982
262	Episode 16	Ian Smith	Juliana Focht	31 March 1982
263	Episode 17	Michael Freundt & Andrew Kennedy	Wayne Cameron	6 April 1982
264	Episode 18	John Mortimore	Wayne Cameron	7 April 1982
265	Episode 19	Ian Bradley	Lex Van Os	13 April 1982
266	Episode 20	Dave Worthington	Lex Van Os	14 April 1982
267	Episode 21	Coral Drouyn	Kendal Flanagan	20 April 1982
268	Episode 22	Ian Smith	Kendal Flanagan	21 April 1982
269	Episode 23	Ian Bradley	Juliana Focht	27 April 1982
270	Episode 24	Wendy Jackson	Juliana Focht	28 April 1982
271	Episode 25	Dave Worthington	John Gauci	4 May 1982
272	Episode 26	Barbara Ramsay	John Gauci	5 May 1982
273	Episode 27	Coral Drouyn	Peter Sharp	11 May 1982
274	Episode 28	John Mortimore	Peter Sharp	12 May 1982
275	Episode 29	Bryon Williams	Kendal Flanagan	18 May 1982
276	Episode 30	Ray Kolle	Kendal Flanagan	19 May 1982
277	Episode 31	Wendy Jackson	Juliana Focht	25 May 1982
278	Episode 32	Ian Bradley & Andrew Kennedy	Juliana Focht	26 May 1982
279	Episode 33	Dave Worthington	John McRae	1 June 1982
280	Episode 34	Dave Worthington & Coral Drouyn	John McRae	2 June 1982
281	Episode 35	Coral Drouyn	Marcus Cole	8 June 1982
282	Episode 36	John Mortimore	Marcus Cole	9 June 1982
283	Episode 37	Bryon Williams	Kendal Flanagan	15 June 1982
284	Episode 38	Ian Smith & Andrew Kennedy	Kendal Flanagan	16 June 1982
285	Episode 39	Wendy Jackson	John Duncan	22 June 1982
286	Episode 40	Ray Kolle	John Duncan	23 June 1982
The authorities close in on Chrissie Latham as she tries to leave the State with her own daughter. Susie Driscoll prepares for her release.
287	Episode 41	John Mortimore	John McRae	29 June 1982
Susie Driscoll is released into the custody of Mrs Beamish. Chrissie Latham is put back inside. Joan Ferguson makes her debut as a cell search is conducted in search of illicit liquor. Doreen finds herself the first victim of Joan's black leather gloves.
288	Episode 42	Coral Drouyn	John McRae	30 June 1982
Susie Driscoll is caught coming home late. Latham tries to seduce Mr Fawkner.
289	Episode 43	Dave Worthington	Lex Van Os	6 July 1982
Latham gets Steve Fawkner suspended. Ferguson is caught with files outside the office while molesting Hannah Simpson. A group of thugs try to break Hannah out in court.
290	Episode 44	Graham Foreman	Lex Van Os	7 July 1982
Bea gets a defamatory article about Steve Fawkner published. Ferguson warns Latham she must tell the truth about Steve Fawkner if she wants to see her daughter.
291	Episode 45	Wendy Jackson	Kendal Flanagan	13 July 1982
Judy Bryant is released. Steve Fawkner's "friendship" with Wendy is ruined by the scandal despite being cleared.
292	Episode 46	Ray Kolle	Kendal Flanagan	14 July 1982
Susie drifts into the gutter after quitting her job at the "Chuck Wagon".
293	Episode 47	Dave Worthington	Juliana Focht	20 July 1982
Susie loses her virginity.
294	Episode 48	Anne Lucas	Juliana Focht	20 July 1982
Chrissie Latham escapes, and places Hannah's mother in danger. Colleen almost catches the Freak molesting Hannah in solitary.
295	Episode 49	Coral Drouyn	John McRae	21 July 1982
The Freak gets Birdsworth drunk to make her tell her where the still is hidden.
296	Episode 50	Alan Hopgood	John McRae	27 July 1982
Donna Mason is arrested and brought into Wentworth to face the music about letting Susie slip into the gutter. Chrissie Latham is enraged by her losing battle to get custody of Elizabeth.
297	Episode 51	Patrea Smallacombe & Andrew Kennedy	Ray Kolle	28 July 1982
The Freak gives Latham a hell of a beating. Maxine Daniels is inducted: she knows Joan Ferguson from Boggo Road in Queensland. Des forcibly injects Susie full of heroin.
298	Episode 52	John Mortimore	Lex Van Os	3 August 1982
Donna is so desperate for a fix she offers herself to the Freak as payment. Latham is backed into a corner, forced to surrender her baby to Derek and Brenda.
299	Episode 53	Bryon Williams	Sam Simmonds & John Duncan	4 August 1982
The Freak spills her guts to Hannah about her past, but will this evidence be damning enough for Hannah to get her the sack?
300	Episode 54	Dave Worthington	Sam Simmonds & John Duncan	10 August 1982
Erica Davidson is not happy with the report on Joan Ferguson's service at Boggo Road, but it's not for the reasons you think. Doreen is released without being allowed to say goodbye to her mates.
301	Episode 55	Coral Drouyn	Mandy Smith	11 August 1982
The women go on strike to boycott the Freak. Doreen gets a job at the shoe factory.
302	Episode 56	Marcus Cole	Mandy Smith	17 August 1982
Susie Driscoll leaves the Halfway House to start a new life. The owner of the shoe factory orders that Doreen be sacked. That night, the shoe factory burns down. An attempt is made on Donna's life. Ferguson has a cruel ultimatum for the striking prisoners.
303	Episode 57	Graham Foreman	John McRae	18 August 1982
Bea is forced to back down and end the strike. Donna is put back inside, and dies in Bea's arms. Barbara is arrested for theft, arson and murder.
304	Episode 58	Wendy Jackson	John McRae	24 August 1982
Barbara is inducted alongside Paddy Lawson. Steve Fawkner campaigns for Birdsworth's release. Maxine invites her boyfriend and his mates over to the Halfway House to make a mess of it as Judy fights the red tape to get the House approved. Doreen leaves.
305	Episode 59	Anne Lucas	John Gauci	25 August 1982
Up until now, Bea has said she has had nothing left to lose, because she is already serving life. Now, she is being considered for parole. Maxine makes amends with the Halfway House by stealing goods from a hardware store. Neil Murray starts work as the prison nurse.
306	Episode 60	Marcus Cole & Patrea Smallacombe	John Gauci	31 August 1982
Maxine is caught by an undercover policeman putting stolen goods into a charity bin.
307	Episode 61	Dave Worthington	Lex Van Os	1 September 1982
Margo Gaffney, on the run having escaped from Barnhurst, steals Meg's car and runs down a pedestrian.
308	Episode 62	Ian Smith	Lex Van Os	7 September 1982
Meg is put inside for 3 days for contempt of court.
309	Episode 63	Coral Drouyn	Kendal Flanagan	8 September 1982
Penny Seymour is callously murdered by a black-gloved villain.
310	Episode 64	Andrew Kennedy & Patrea Smallacombe	Kendal Flanagan	14 September 1982
Meg finishes her stint on the wrong side of the bars, after the women tar and feather Gaffney for giving her a bashing.
311	Episode 65	John Mortimore	John McRae	15 September 1982
Another prostitute is murdered. Police report finding a black glove at the scene. Meg warns Gaffney to leave Paddy alone.
312	Episode 66	Bryon Williams	John McRae	21 September 1982
Will Helen Smart become the next victim of the Black-Gloved Killer? Paddy agrees to undergo hypnotherapy.
313	Episode 67	Wendy Jackson	Leigh Spence	22 September 1982
Maxine starts work as a babysitter for the Dempster family. Gaffney plays a cruel prank on Paddy.
314	Episode 68	Dave Worthington	Leigh Spence	28 September 1982
Bea prepares to experience life out in the big wide world. Attempts to lure the Freak into a trap backfire.
315	Episode 69	Graham Foreman	John Gauci	29 September 1982
Steve Fawkner is forced to resign. The true identity of the Black Gloved Killer is revealed. Bea begins unsupervised work release.
316	Episode 70	Coral Drouyn	John Gauci	5 October 1982
Fawkner says goodbye to Wentworth. Latham and the other prisoners struggle to realise what Neil Murray really is. Sally Dempster runs down her husband.
317	Episode 71	Patrea Smallacombe	Mandy Smith	6 October 1982
Dempster gets herself into trouble inside Wentworth. The women go on their outing to Pentridge. Meg is suspended.
318	Episode 72	Barry Main & Andrew Kennedy	Mandy Smith	12 October 1982
The women are allowed to mingle with the men at Pentridge.
319	Episode 73	Wendy Jackson	Sam Simmonds	13 October 1982
Dempster attempts suicide. Meg and Colleen try to make peace with their Freaky colleague.
320	Episode 74	John Mortimore	Sam Simmonds	19 October 1982
Something stinks about Kerry's backstory. The Freak's dog is poisoned when her diaries are stolen.
321	Episode 75	Dave Worthington	Leigh Spence	20 October 1982
Bea loses her job at the print shop. Birdsworth gets injured as the concert is ruined by an escape plot.
322	Episode 76	Coral Drouyn	Leigh Spence & Steve Mann	26 October 1982
The Freak thwarts Bea's employment prospects.
323	Episode 77	Ian Smith	Kendal Flanagan	27 October 1982
The Freak is on the rampage, taunting Bea about the death of her daughter, and giving Paddy a humiliating body search.
324	Episode 78	Geoffrey Nottage	Kendal Flanagan	2 November 1982
Lizzie's condition in hospital seems to deteriorate. Should Bea get her parole just to "spite Joan Ferguson"?
325	Episode 79	Graeme Foreman	Chris Adshead	9 November 1982
The news of Lizzie's supposed death spreads through Wentworth. Barbara's time is running out as she continues to hide the diaries from Joan. Bea's future is decided. Will Tony fall for Maxine's charms?
326	Episode 80	Dave Worthington	Chris Adshead	9 November 1982
The women come up with plan to get rid of the Freak, while Margo has a plan of her own, throwing the prison in to chaos. Bea and Joan's feud finally meets a violent showdown, in the midst of a prison lockdown, which leaves several lives hanging in the balance.

=== Season 5 (1983) ===
In Brisbane, following Val Lehman's resignation, TVQ-0 cancelled the series after episode 400 was aired

No. overall	Episode	Directed by	Written by	Original release date
327	Episode 1	Anne Lucas	Juliana Focht	1 February 1983
Wentworth continues to burn with Bea, The Freak and Paddy trapped inside, the three of them make their way to the roof. Erica makes it out alive. The women are transferred to Woodridge.
328	Episode 2	Barry Main	Juliana Focht	3 February 1983
329	Episode 3	Coral Drouyn	Steve Mann	8 February 1983
330	Episode 4	Patrea Smallacombe	Leigh Spence	10 February 1983
331	Episode 5	Bryon Williams	Kendal Flanagan	15 February 1983
332	Episode 6	Wendy Jackson	Kendal Flanagan	17 February 1983
333	Episode 7	Dave Worthington	Chris Adshead	22 February 1983
334	Episode 8	Anne Lucas	Chris Adshead	24 February 1983
335	Episode 9	Ian Bradley	Lex Van Os	1 March 1983
336	Episode 10	Coral Drouyn	Lex Van Os	3 March 1983
337	Episode 11	Angela Barr & Andrew Kennedy	Steve Mann	8 March 1983
338	Episode 12	John Mortimore	Steve Mann	8 March 1983
339	Episode 13	Coral Drouyn & Dave Worthington	Kendal Flanagan	10 March 1983
340	Episode 14	Dave Worthington	Kendal Flanagan	15 March 1983
341	Episode 15	Ian Smith	Chris Adshead	17 March 1983
342	Episode 16	Bryon Williams	Chris Adshead	22 March 1983
343	Episode 17	Coral Drouyn	Lex Van Os	24 March 1983
344	Episode 18	Wendy Jackson	Lex Van Os	29 March 1983
345	Episode 19	John Mortimore	Steve Mann	31 March 1983
346	Episode 20	Angela Barr	Steve Mann	5 April 1983
347	Episode 21	Dave Worthington	Kendal Flanagan	7 April 1983
348	Episode 22	Andrew Kennedy & Patrea Smallacombe	Kendal Flanagan	12 April 1983
349	Episode 23	Coral Drouyn	Chris Adshead	12 April 1983
350	Episode 24	Dave Worthington	Chris Adshead	14 April 1983
351	Episode 25	Ian Smith	Lex Van Os	19 April 1983
352	Episode 26	John Mortimore	Lex Van Os	21 April 1983
353	Episode 27	Patrea Smallacombe	Steve Mann	26 April 1983
354	Episode 28	Wendy Jackson	Steve Mann	28 April 1983
355	Episode 29	Andrew Kennedy & Billie Morton	Kendal Flanagan	3 May 1983
356	Episode 30	Andrew Kennedy & Billie Morton	Kendal Flanagan	5 May 1983
357	Episode 31	Dave Worthington	Chris Adshead; Sydney Location: John McRae	10 May 1983
358	Episode 32	Coral Drouyn	Chris Adshead; Sydney Location: John McRae	12 May 1983
359	Episode 33	Wendy Jackson	Lex Van Os; Sydney Location: John McRae	17 May 1983
360	Episode 34	Ian Smith	Lex Van Os; Sydney Location: John McRae	19 May 1983
361	Episode 35	Wendy Jackson & Billie Morton	Steve Mann	24 May 1983
362	Episode 36	Dave Worthington	Steve Mann	26 May 1983
363	Episode 37	Bryon Williams	Kendal Flanagan	31 May 1983
364	Episode 38	Coral Drouyn	Kendal Flanagan	2 June 1983
365	Episode 39	Ian Smith	Chris Adshead	2 June 1983
366	Episode 40	Dave Worthington	Chris Adshead	7 June 1983
367	Episode 41	Marcus Cole	Steve Mann	9 June 1983
368	Episode 42	Patrea Smallacombe & Andrew Kennedy	Lex Van Os	14 June 1983
369	Episode 43	Coral Drouyn	Steve Mann	16 June 1983
370	Episode 44	Wendy Jackson	Steve Mann	21 June 1983
371	Episode 45	Bryon Williams	Kendal Flanagan	23 June 1983
372	Episode 46	Billie Morton	Kendal Flanagan	28 June 1983
373	Episode 47	Coral Drouyn	John Gauci	30 June 1983
374	Episode 48	Dave Worthington	John Gauci	30 June 1983
375	Episode 49	Ian Smith	William Templer	5 July 1983
376	Episode 50	Wendy Jackson	William Templer	7 July 1983
377	Episode 51	Sydney Jackson & Frank Howson	Steve Mann	12 July 1983
Pixie Mason arrives at Driscoll House, calling herself Sandy Gilham. Joan takes Jill Coulson to the zoo. Carol Coulson hangs herself in her cell when Jill rejects her.
378	Episode 52	Bryon Williams	Steve Mann	14 July 1983
379	Episode 53	Coral Drouyn	Kendal Flanagan	19 July 1983
380	Episode 54	Dave Worthington & Wendy Jackson	Kendal Flanagan	21 July 1983
381	Episode 55	Fay Rousseaux & Wendy Jackson	John Gauci	26 July 1983
382	Episode 56	Coral Drouyn	John Gauci	26 July 1983
383	Episode 57	Wendy Jackson	Bill Templer	28 July 1983
384	Episode 58	Ian Smith	Bill Templer	2 August 1983
385	Episode 59	Bryon Williams	Steve Mann	4 August 1983
386	Episode 60	Coral Drouyn	Steve Mann	9 August 1983
387	Episode 61	Fay Rousseaux & Frank Howson	Chris Adshead	11 August 1983
388	Episode 62	Wendy Jackson	Chris Adshead	16 August 1983
389	Episode 63	Ian Smith	Godfrey Philipp	18 August 1983
390	Episode 64	Lex Van Os & Andrew Kennedy	Godfrey Philipp	23 August 1983
391	Episode 65	Andrew Kennedy & Fay Rousseaux	Bill Templer	25 August 1983
392	Episode 66	Sydney Jackson	Bill Templer	30 August 1983
393	Episode 67	Coral Drouyn	Steve Mann	1 September 1983
394	Episode 68	Lex Van Os & Ian Smith	Steve Mann	6 September 1983
395	Episode 69	Wendy Jackson	Chris Adshead	8 September 1983
396	Episode 70	Bryon Williams & Jim Simmonds	Chris Adshead	13 September 1983
397	Episode 71	Sydney Jackson	Ross Jennings	13 September 1983
398	Episode 72	Fay Rousseaux & Andrew Kennedy	Ross Jennings	15 September 1983
The day of Petra's court case finally arrives. Colleen and Meg are in for a few surprises when they escort Lizzie on day release to meet her old friend, Mick. Bea uncovers that Sonia has been secretly working with Joan as their plot to scam the women continues. Hazel's condition deteriorates further, for which she begs Judy for one final request.
399	Episode 73	Coral Drouyn	Mark De Friest	20 September 1983
400	Episode 74	Ian Smith	Mark De Friest	22 September 1983
Hazel is found dead and the women at Driscoll House become suspicious of Judy. Sonia persuades Joan to get rid of Bea once and for all; Joan goads Bea into bashing her and consequently she is transferred to Barnhurst for good, leading Sonia to become her successor as Top Dog.
401	Episode 75	Wendy Jackson	Mark Piper	29 September 1983
Lizzie and the other prisoners are upset over Bea's sudden departure. Judy is still missing, and news circulates that she is wanted for Hazel's murder. New prisoner Cass Parker is transferred from Barnhurst, charged with murdering a prison officer.
402	Episode 76	Madga de la Pesca & James Simmonds	Mark Piper	29 September 1983
403	Episode 77	Andrew Kennedy & Fay Rousseaux	Kendal Flanagan	4 October 1983
404	Episode 78	Liddy Holloway & Lex Van Os	Kendal Flanagan	6 October 1983
405	Episode 79	Coral Drouyn	Ross Jennings	11 October 1983
Remand prisoners Minnie Donovan and Bobbie Mitchell arrive at Wentworth. Minnie knows Ann Reynolds from their days working in child welfare. Minnie was a foster mother to children she trained to be shoplifters. Lizzie meets her long lost son, Arthur.
406	Episode 80	Ian Smith & James Simmonds	Ross Jennings	13 October 1983
407	Episode 81	Lex Van Os & Betty Quin	Greg Shears	18 October 1983
408	Episode 82	Magda de la Pesca & Betty Quin	Greg Shears	18 October 1983
409	Episode 83	Andrew Kennedy & Fay Rousseaux	Mark Piper	20 October 1983
410	Episode 84	Lex Van Os & Liddy Holloway	Mark Piper	25 October 1983
411	Episode 85	Coral Drouyn	Kendal Flanagan	25 October 1983
412	Episode 86	Ian Smith	Kendal Flanagan	27 October 1983
413	Episode 87	Andrew Kennedy & Kevin Anderson	Ross Jennings	1 November 1983
Following Ann's discovery, Wally suddenly feels rejected and turns to Sam for comfort. Joan miraculously retrieves the tape from Baxter and returns to Wentworth with nothing to lose; a visit from the Fellow's Gang ends in tragedy for Joan.
414	Episode 88	James Simmonds	Ross Jennings	1 November 1983
Joan goes on the rampage at Wentworth following her traumatic ordeal. Ann stresses over her current health scare, as Wally remains in the dark. Paul receives a glimmer of hope concerning his case. Bobbie makes peace with her fellow inmates. All is not what it seems when David's true intentions are finally revealed.
415	Episode 89	James Simmonds & Lyn Ogilvy	Bill Templer	3 November 1983
In light of Randi's supposed escape, tighter restrictions are set in place. Ann discovers the truth about Wally and Sam. Belinda attempts to prove her capability. Meg grows suspicious of David. Lizzie finally looks forward to a positive future. Sam clears Paul's name. Colleen tries to convince Ann to see a doctor. Brenda sets up a meeting between Joan and Fellows.
416	Episode 90	Coral Drouyn	Bill Templer	3 November 1983
Fellows agrees to spare Joan's life, in exchange for Brenda's safety. Ann finally decides to seek help. It's the day of Bobby's trial and she plans not to return to Wentworth. Lizzie fronts the parole board, but before she receives the news, she makes a shocking discovery about David.

=== Season 6 (1984) ===
No. overall	Episode	Directed by	Written by	Original release date
417	Episode 1	Lex Van Os & Andrew Kennedy	Steve Mann	17 January 1984
Lizzie collapses in the garden. Cass murders David when he tries to kill her. Minnie gets good news from the department. Ann thwarts a reconciliation with Wally when he makes the discovery about her illness. Minnie steals Joan's keys as a means of making her look inadequate, while Joan and Sonia find a way of setting her up.
418	Episode 2	Ian Smith & Lyn Ogilvy	Steve Mann	24 January 1984
Joan claims that Minnie attacked her and stole her keys; however, Colleen remains in doubt. The women say goodbye to Lizzie. Sonia agrees to make trouble for Colleen if Joan aids her in regaining the Top Dog position. Scott hands in his resignation. Ann becomes distraught following her mastectomy. Meg takes Pixie on a job interview and they end up getting separated; Pixie later reveals that she has got a job in a wedding dress shop, unbeknown to everyone. Cass finds a pet mouse. Minnie is poisoned in solitary.
419	Episode 3	Wendy Jackson	Kendal Flanagan	31 January 1984
420	Episode 4	Coral Drouyn & Ray Kolle	Kendal Flanagan	7 February 1984
421	Episode 5	Andrew Kennedy & Fay Rousseaux	Ross Jennings	9 February 1984
422	Episode 6	James Simmonds	Ross Jennings	16 February 1984
423	Episode 7	Coral Drouyn	Bill Templer	21 February 1984
424	Episode 8	Ian Smith & Lex Van Os	Bill Templer	21 February 1984
425	Episode 9	Wendy Jackson & Lyn Ogilvy	Steve Mann	23 February 1984
426	Episode 10	Andrew Kennedy & Fay Rousseaux	Steve Mann	28 February 1984
427	Episode 11	Fay Rousseaux & Ian Smith	Kendal Flanagan	28 February 1984
428	Episode 12	David Phillips & James Simmonds	Kendal Flanagan	1 March 1984
429	Episode 13	James Simmonds & Betty Quin	Ross Jennings	6 March 1984
430	Episode 14	Lyn Ogilvy & Ray Kolle	Ross Jennings	8 March 1984
431	Episode 15	Betty Quin	Bill Templer	13 March 1984
432	Episode 16	Coral Drouyn & James Simmonds	Bill Templer	13 March 1984
433	Episode 17	Lyn Ogilvy & Ian Smith	Steve Mann	15 March 1984
434	Episode 18	Betty Quin & Ray Kolle	Steve Mann	22 March 1984
435	Episode 19	Ray Kolle & Coral Drouyn	Kendal Flanagan	27 March 1984
436	Episode 20	Ian Smith & Fay Rousseaux	Kendal Flanagan	29 March 1984
437	Episode 21	Coral Drouyn & James Simmonds	Ross Jennings	3 April 1984
438	Episode 22	Bryon Williams & Betty Quin	Ross Jennings	5 April 1984
439	Episode 23	David Phillips & Ray Kolle	Julian McSwiney	10 April 1984
440	Episode 24	Fay Rousseaux & James Simmonds	Julian McSwiney	10 April 1984
441	Episode 25	Unknown	Unknown	12 April 1984
442	Episode 26	Fay Rousseaux & Ian Smith	Steve Mann	17 April 1984
443	Episode 27	Betty Quin & Andrew Kennedy	Kendal Flanagan	19 April 1984
444	Episode 28	Ray Kolle & David Phillips	Kendal Flanagan	24 April 1984
445	Episode 29	James Simmonds & Andrew Kennedy	Godfrey Philipp	26 April 1984
446	Episode 30	Fay Rousseaux & Betty Quin	Godfrey Philipp	1 May 1984
447	Episode 31	Christopher Milne & Ray Kolle	Julian McSwiney	1 May 1984
448	Episode 32	Coral Drouyn	Julian McSwiney	1 May 1984
449	Episode 33	Ian Smith & Andrew Kennedy	Steve Mann	8 May 1984
450	Episode 34	Fay Rousseaux & Sally Webb	Steve Mann	10 May 1984
451	Episode 35	Ian Smith & Fay Rousseaux	Kendal Flanagan	15 May 1984
452	Episode 36	James Simmonds & Betty Quin	Kendal Flanagan	17 May 1984
453	Episode 37	Ian Smith & Andrew Kennedy	Colin Budds	22 May 1984
454	Episode 38	Coral Drouyn	Colin Budds	24 May 1984
455	Episode 39	James Simmonds & Sally Webb	Julian McSwiney	29 May 1984
456	Episode 40	Christopher Milne & Betty Quin	Julian McSwiney	31 May 1984
457	Episode 41	Fay Rousseaux & Lawrence Toma	Steve Mann	5 June 1984
458	Episode 42	Andrew Kennedy & Marcus Cole	Steve Mann	7 June 1984
459	Episode 43	Beverly Phillips & Coral Drouyn	Kendal Flanagan	12 June 1984
460	Episode 44	Coral Drouyn & Ian Smith	Kendal Flanagan	14 June 1984
461	Episode 45	Fay Rousseaux & Sally Webb	Colin Budds	19 June 1984
462	Episode 46	Betty Quin & James Simmonds	Colin Budds	21 June 1984
463	Episode 47	Ian Smith	Mandy Smith	26 June 1984
464	Episode 48	Marcus Cole & Ian Coughlan	Mandy Smith	26 June 1984
465	Episode 49	Betty Quin & Fay Rousseaux	Steve Mann	28 June 1984
466	Episode 50	Coral Drouyn	Steve Mann	3 July 1984
Leigh decides to pre-empt Roland over her porn films by selling her story to Camilla Wells. Ann ends her friendship with Wally for good when he admits that he helped Myra. Edna attempts to poison a naive Marlene. Joan punishes Shane for staying out all night. Judy is certain that Joan is about to overthrow Ann in a bid for the position of governor, therefore, Marie has instigated a riot, silently aided by Joan. Having taken full force of the prison, Marie, with the help of Reb, attempts to kill Myra in solitary in an attempt to remain as Top Dog. When Reb backs out, Marie pushes her down a flight of stairs, leaving Bobbie to take the blame.
467	Episode 51	James Simmonds & Andrew Kennedy	Kendal Flanagan	5 July 1984
468	Episode 52	Sally Webb	Kendal Flanagan	5 July 1984
469	Episode 53	Fay Rousseaux & David Phillips	Colin Budds	10 July 1984
470	Episode 54	Betty Quin & John Powers	Colin Budds	12 July 1984
471	Episode 55	Coral Drouyn	Mandy Smith	24 July 1984
472	Episode 56	Ian Smith & Fay Rousseaux	Mandy Smith	26 July 1984
473	Episode 57	Fay Rousseaux & David Phillips	Steve Mann	31 July 1984
474	Episode 58	Sally Webb & Andrew Kennedy	Steve Mann	2 August 1984
475	Episode 59	Alister Webb & Jim Simmonds	Kendal Flanagan	7 August 1984
476	Episode 60	Sue Masters	Kendal Flanagan	9 August 1984
477	Episode 61	Sally Webb	Colin Budds	14 August 1984
478	Episode 62	Coral Drouyn	Colin Budds	16 August 1984
479	Episode 63	Ian Smith	Brian Lennane	21 August 1984
480	Episode 64	Fay Rousseaux	Brian Lennane	23 August 1984
481	Episode 65	Jan Smith & John Powers	Steve Mann	28 August 1984
482	Episode 66	Jim Simmonds & Noelle Cahill	Steve Mann	30 August 1984
483	Episode 67	Coral Drouyn	Kendal Flanagan	4 September 1984
Meg is brutally raped, but is reluctant to report the attack. Bobbie is forced to face the other women following her fight with Angel. Joan informs Reb that she is living on borrowed time. Angel's grandmother pays a visit and reveals to Ann that her granddaughter is not as innocent as she seems. Angel attempts to buy Joan's protection by secretly lagging to her about the plan Heather and the women have to get rid of her, while the women finally discover her true colours. Stan Dobson returns and applies for the prison handyman's job, only to be confronted by a threatening applicant. Joan sets up Deirdre to have her bashed.
484	Episode 68	Andrew Kennedy & Christine Milne	Kendal Flanagan	6 September 1984
Reb makes amends with Deirdre following the attack. Meg is forced to relive her ordeal when she makes a report to the police. Angel remains in coventry with the other women. Stan is offered the job of handyman, but Edie mistakenly believes he is returning to work as a prison officer. Pixie returns to Wentworth. Reb has a score to settle with Lou for bashing her mother. Heather pays the price as the plan to set up Joan backfires.
485	Episode 69	Sally Webb	Colin Budds	11 September 1984
Meg is furious with Phillip over his remark at the police station. Joan is gloating following the failed set-up attempt, as the women realise that any genuine grievances against her may go unnoticed in future. New prisoner, Kerryn Davies is struggling to cope without her husband. Stan obtains his old prison uniform so that Edie will not discover the truth about his handyman job. Bobbie meets her little sister the first time, while things with her father remain hostile. The women discover that Angel was behind Meg's attack. Lou is determined to see that Stan loses his job and lags on Reb in exchange for a favour. Reb gets the upper hand of Joan, whose life is left hanging in the balance.
486	Episode 70	David Phillips	Colin Budds	13 September 1984
Joan is rescued from a near-fatal accident, but Ann is inclined to believe Reb's story. Ann reports another poison pen letter to the police. Kerryn attempts to adjust to life in Wentworth. Stan continues to keep up the facade, but Sloan discovers the truth and threatens to tell Edie if he does not quit his job. Angel continues to play dangerous games, but ultimately takes things too far when Dot is poisoned, forcing Myra to take matters into her own hands. Ann returns home to find Inspector Rouse waiting with some unsettling news.
487	Episode 71	Ian Smith	Brian Lennane	18 September 1984
488	Episode 72	Fay Rousseaux	Brian Lennane	18 September 1984
489	Episode 73	Coral Drouyn	Steve Mann	20 September 1984
490	Episode 74	Jim Simmonds	Steve Mann	25 September 1984
491	Episode 75	Ian Coughlan & Fay Rousseaux	Kendal Flanagan	27 September 1984
492	Episode 76	Noelle Cahill & Andrew Kennedy	Kendal Flanagan	2 October 1984
493	Episode 77	Christopher Milne & Alister Webb	Colin Budds	4 October 1984
494	Episode 78	Christopher Milne & Alister Webb	Colin Budds	4 October 1984
495	Episode 79	Fay Rousseaux & John Orcsik	Brian Lennane	9 October 1984
496	Episode 80	Tom Ettridge & Jim Simmonds	Brian Lennane	11 October 1984
497	Episode 81	John Powers & Coral Drouyn	Steve Mann	18 October 1984
498	Episode 82	Ian Coughlan	Steve Mann	18 October 1984
499	Episode 83	Ian Smith	Kendal Flanagan	23 October 1984
500	Episode 84	Coral Drouyn	Kendal Flanagan	25 October 1984
501	Episode 85	Fay Rousseaux	Chris Adshead	30 October 1984
502	Episode 86	Sally Webb	Chris Adshead	30 October 1984
503	Episode 87	Alister Webb	Catherine Millar	1 November 1984
504	Episode 88	Christine Gordon & Noelle Cahill	Catherine Millar	8 November 1984
505	Episode 89	Michael Joshua	Steve Mann	8 November 1984
Having discovered Reb's true colours, Myra vows to put a stop to the drug racket and bring her down. Pixie attempts to protect the new mute prisoner, "Jane Doe", against Lou and when Pixie stumbles upon drugs in Lou's cell, Reb secretly lags on Lou while having her believe it was Pixie who lagged, ultimately putting Pixie in danger. Reb's time as top dog is up when Myra finally exposes her to the other women.

=== Season 7 (1985) ===
No. overall	Episode	Directed by	Written by	Original release date
506	Episode 1	Coral Drouyn	Steve Mann	24 January 1985
Myra saves Pixie. Reb exacts revenge on Myra and ends up being transferred to Blackmoor.
507	Episode 2	Ian Coughlan & David Phillips	Sean Nash	29 January 1985
508	Episode 3	Christopher Milne & Ian Coughlan	Sean Nash	31 January 1985
509	Episode 4	John Orcsik & Betty Quin	Chris Adshead	5 February 1985
510	Episode 5	Fay Rousseaux	Chris Adshead	7 February 1985
511	Episode 6	Jim Simmonds & Alister Webb	Catherine Millar	12 February 1985
512	Episode 7	Coral Drouyn	Catherine Millar	14 February 1985
513	Episode 8	John Orcsik & Fay Rousseaux	Steve Mann	19 February 1985
514	Episode 9	Patrea Smallacombe & Ian Smith	Steve Mann	21 February 1985
515	Episode 10	Ian Smith	Kendal Flanagan	26 February 1985
516	Episode 11	Ian Coughlan	Kendal Flanagan	28 February 1985
517	Episode 12	Fay Rousseaux	Chris Adshead	12 March 1985
518	Episode 13	Coral Drouyn	Chris Adshead	14 March 1985
519	Episode 14	James Simmonds & Alister Webb	Sean Nash	14 March 2015
520	Episode 15	Ian Smith	Sean Nash	19 March 1985
521	Episode 16	Judy Rivers & Ted Ogden	Steve Mann	21 March 1985
522	Episode 17	Christopher Milne & Fay Rousseaux	Steve Mann	28 March 1985
523	Episode 18	Ian Coughlan	Kendal Flanagan	2 April 1985
524	Episode 19	John Orcsik	Kendal Flanagan	4 April 1985
525	Episode 20	Fay Rousseaux	Chris Adshead	9 April 1985
526	Episode 21	Coral Drouyn	Chris Adshead	11 April 1985
527	Episode 22	Gail Meillon & Alister Webb	Sean Nash	16 April 1985
528	Episode 23	Ted Ogden	Sean Nash	18 April 1985
529	Episode 24	James Simmonds & Fay Rousseaux	Steve Mann	23 April 1985
530	Episode 25	William Shaw & John Orcsik	Steve Mann	25 April 1985
531	Episode 26	Ian Smith	Kendal Flanagan	25 April 1985
532	Episode 27	Ian Coughlan	Kendal Flanagan	30 April 1985
533	Episode 28	Coral Drouyn	Steve Mann	2 May 1985
534	Episode 29	Fay Rousseaux	Steve Mann	7 May 1985
535	Episode 30	James Simmonds & Peter Dick	Sean Nash	9 May 1985
536	Episode 31	Coral Drouyn	Sean Nash	14 May 1985
Myra becomes withdrawn following Ann's ultimatum. Anita unsuccessfully attempts to explain to the women why she lagged, before being released from Wentworth. Joan receives a visit from Anita in the hospital, with whom she is grateful for clearing her name. The women reminisce about past times at Wentworth. Ann receives news that Bea Smith has been killed in a fire a Barnhurst.
537	Episode 32	Ian Smith	Kendal Flanagan	16 May 1985
538	Episode 33	Ted Ogden	Kendal Flanagan	21 May 1985
539	Episode 34	John Orcsik	Sean Nash	23 May 1985
540	Episode 35	Ian Coughlan	Sean Nash	28 May 1985
541	Episode 36	Gail Meillon & Alister Webb	Steve Mann	30 May 1985
542	Episode 37	Fay Rousseaux	Steve Mann	4 June 1985
543	Episode 38	Kit Oldfield & James Simmonds	Chris Adshead	6 June 1985
544	Episode 39	Coral Drouyn	Chris Adshead	11 June 1985
545	Episode 40	Craig Wilkins & Patrea Smallacombe	Kendal Flanagan	13 June 1985
546	Episode 41	Fay Rousseaux & Coral Drouyn	Kendal Flanagan	13 June 1985
547	Episode 42	Ian Coughlan	Sean Nash	18 June 1985
548	Episode 43	Coral Drouyn	Sean Nash	20 June 1985
549	Episode 44	John Orcsik	Steve Mann & Tony Osicka	25 June 1985
550	Episode 45	Fay Rousseaux	Steve Mann	27 June 1985
The armed men search for Ruth. The police arrive and the terrorists promise to kill an inmate on the hour of every hour until they are given a clean getaway from Wentworth with Ruth.
551	Episode 46	James Simmonds	Chris Adshead	2 July 1985
The women pull together to overpower the terrorists but an inmate is shot and killed. Julie goes through the ducting to the governors office. Ruth gives Myra a choice; choose an inmate to be shot or Nora will be killed.
552	Episode 47	Coral Drouyn	Chris Adshead	9 July 1985
Myra sacrifices herself for the sake of the other women. Julie gets through to the police. The terrorists getaway with Ruth and Joan, unaware the police are one step ahead of them.
553	Episode 48	Alister Webb	Kendal Flanagan	11 July 1985
Nora is under suspicion of murder rather than her claim of self defense. Alice is given 10 years for Sam's murder. Jenny is advised to plead guilty to manslaughter. Nora tries to talk a depressed Daphne down from the roof. The news is out that Frank Burke has escaped. Ruth has been sent to Blackmoor which puts Joan's life in danger.
554	Episode 49	Ian Coughlan	Kendal Flanagan	16 July 1985
An unconscious Joan is rescued from the house fire and in attempt to spare her life she asks a favour of Blackmoor governor Cynthia Leach as a last resort. It is suggested that Daphne's erratic behaviour could be the result of PMS. Jenny is no closer to discovering who killed her grandmother. Frank takes Meg and Dennis hostage at gunpoint.
555	Episode 50	Fay Rousseaux	Sean Nash	18 July 1985
Joan worries for Terri's safety and meets with Cynthia and pleads with her to have Ruth taken care of. Ettie decides she wants out of prison so that she can use her money to help others. Jenny receives some bad news. Frank viciously shoots Dennis before being recaptured; he later fears that he may never walk again.
556	Episode 51	Fay Rousseaux	Sean Nash	23 July 1985
Joan meets with Fellows and urges him to have Arnie Ballinger call of the contract on her life in return for Ruth's safety at Blackmoor. Meg is undecided to tell Dennis the truth about his condition. Queenie Marshall arrives at Wentworth and gets off to a bad start with the other women. Nora and Ann attend Myra's funeral. Nora receives a visit from Mick Kirby, her child's possible father. Lou gets into a fight with Nora and May resulting in a fatal attack.
557	Episode 52	Kit Oldfield	Chris Langman	25 July 1985
Nora suffers a miscarriage which she believes is punishment for her past. Lou is confident that she is finally on her way to becoming top dog. Joan is elected unopposed as Union Rep to replace Dennis. Ann is offered Andrew Fry's prior position as head of the department. Mervin has an epileptic seizure and asks Lexie and Nora to keep it a secret as it could cost him his job. Nora tries to strangle Lou for causing her miscarriage.
558	Episode 53	Dave Worthington	Chris Langman	30 July 1985
Nora fronts the parole board following her attack on Lou. Joan attempts to prevent Julie from visiting her dying mother, while a desperate Julie looks for another alternative. Jenny begins to suspect that her Aunt Harriet may know more than she's letting on about her grandmother's murder. Queenie gets an early release.
559	Episode 54	Coral Drouyn	Tony Osicka	1 August 1985
Nora makes some unwanted changes to how she operates as the new top dog. The officers come down hard on Joan for her treatment towards Julie. Ettie goes to trial and is hopeful for an acquittal. Lexie becomes difficult when she is refused parole. Dennis is upset that Meg has kept her appointment as the new governor from him. Julie is pleased when she granted permission to visit her mother, however, her happiness is short-lived when she later receives some sad news. Jenny discovers that it was her Uncle Steven who killed her grandmother.
560	Episode 55	John Orcsik	Charles Bud Tingwell	6 August 1985
561	Episode 56	Alister Webb & Ian Smith	Kendal Flanagan	8 August 1985
562	Episode 57	Thornton/Smallbone & Gail Meillon	Kendal Flanagan	13 August 1985
563	Episode 58	Fay Rousseaux	Sean Nash	15 August 1985
564	Episode 59	Patrea Smallacombe & James Simmonds	Sean Nash	20 August 1985
565	Episode 60	Ted Ogden & Ian Coughlan	Tony Osicka	22 August 1985
566	Episode 61	Kit Oldfield	Tony Osicka	27 August 1985
567	Episode 62	Merle Thornton & John Smallbone	Charles (Bud) Tingwell	29 August 1985
568	Episode 63	Coral Drouyn	Charles (Bud) Tingwell	3 September 1985
569	Episode 64	Ian Smith	Kendal Flanagan	5 September 1985
570	Episode 65	Alister Webb & James Simmonds	Kendal Flanagan	10 September 1985
571	Episode 66	Dave Worthington	Sean Nash	12 September 1985
572	Episode 67	Fay Rousseaux	Sean Nash	17 September 1985
573	Episode 68	Kit Oldfield	Tony Osicka	24 September 1985
574	Episode 69	Ian Coughlan	Tony Osicka	26 September 1985
575	Episode 70	Merle Thornton & John Smallbone	Mandy Smith	1 October 1985
576	Episode 71	Coral Drouyn	Mandy Smith	1 October 1985
577	Episode 72	Ian Smith & John Coulter	Kendal Flanagan	8 October 1985
578	Episode 73	Kelly Bermingham & Alister Webb	Kendal Flanagan	10 October 1985
579	Episode 74	Dave Worthington	Sean Nash	15 October 1985
580	Episode 75	Fay Rousseaux	Sean Nash	17 October 1985
581	Episode 76	Kit Oldfield & Marie Trevor	Tony Osicka	22 October 1985
582	Episode 77	Ian Coughlan & Gail Meillon	Tony Osicka	22 October 1985
583	Episode 78	Tony McDonald & Merle Thornton	Steve Mann	24 October 1985
584	Episode 79	Coral Drouyn	Steve Mann	29 October 1985
585	Episode 80	John Coulter & Ian Smith	Kendal Flanagan	29 October 1985
586	Episode 81	Alister Webb & Kelly Bermingham	Kendal Flanagan	31 October 1985
New prisoner, Rita Connors immediately clashes with Joan. Joyce is brutally bashed by Eve when she overhears a conversation confirming Eve's guilt; Reb is set-up to take the blame. Lou and Alice ambush Rita, but are in for a surprise when she takes them on single-handed.
587	Episode 82	Dave Worthington	Sean Nash	5 November 1985
588	Episode 83	Fay Rousseaux	Sean Nash	5 November 1985

=== Season 8 (1986) ===
No. overall	Episode	Directed by	Written by	Original release date
589	Episode 1	Ian Coughlan	Tony Osicka	9 January 1986
590	Episode 2	Kit Oldfield	Tony Osicka	16 January 1986
591	Episode 3	Thornton/Smallbone & Bevan Lee	Steve Mann	21 January 1986
592	Episode 4	Marie Trevor & Gail Meillon	Steve Mann	23 January 1986
593	Episode 5	Kelly Bermingham & Ian Smith	Kendal Flanagan	28 January 1986
594	Episode 6	Alister Webb	Kendal Flanagan	30 January 1986
595	Episode 7	Fay Rousseaux	Sean Nash	4 February 1986
596	Episode 8	John Coulter & Tony McDonald	Sean Nash	6 February 1986
597	Episode 9	Ian Coughlan	Tony Osicka	13 February 1986
598	Episode 10	Kit Oldfield	Tony Osicka	18 February 1986
599	Episode 11	Dave Worthington & Marie Trevor	Steve Mann	18 February 1986
600	Episode 12	Ian Smith	Steve Mann	20 February 1986
A riot led by Lou erupts at Wentworth putting several inmates and officers lives in danger. Lexie goes to stay at a brothel. The feud between Rita and The Freak comes to a head.
601	Episode 13	Alister Webb	Kendal Flanagan	25 February 1986
In a race against time, Bob climb through the ducting to put a stop to the riot. Jessie and Barbie are released.
602	Episode 14	Sean Nash & Kelly Bermingham	Kendal Flanagan	27 February 1986
603	Episode 15	Bevan Lee & Neil Luxmoore	Sean Nash	4 March 1986
604	Episode 16	Tony McDonald & John Coulter	Sean Nash	6 March 1986
605	Episode 17	David Stevens	Tony Osicka	11 March 1986
606	Episode 18	Fay Rousseaux	Tony Osicka	13 March 1986
607	Episode 19	Ian Coughlan	Steve Mann	18 March 1986
Rita and Alice face the music over Lou's attack as they attempt to make a desperate bid to clear their names. It is later discovered that Lou's wounds were self-inflicted as a means of escaping.
608	Episode 20	Kit Oldfield	Steve Mann	20 March 1986
609	Episode 21	Michael Joshua	Kendal Flanagan	25 March 1986
610	Episode 22	Gail Meillon & Alison Nisselle	Kendal Flanagan	27 March 1986
611	Episode 23	Neil Luxmoore & Ian Coughlan	Sean Nash	1 April 1986
612	Episode 24	Sean Nash & Bevan Lee	Sean Nash	3 April 1986
613	Episode 25	Ian Coughlan & John Coulter	Tony Osicka	8 April 1986
614	Episode 26	Alister Webb	Tony Osicka	10 April 1986
615	Episode 27	Quincey McQuade & Alison Nisselle	Brendan Maher	15 April 1986
616	Episode 28	Kit Oldfield	Brendan Maher	17 April 1986
617	Episode 29	Ian Coughlan	Kendal Flanagan	22 April 1986
618	Episode 30	John Clifford White & Bevan Lee	Kendal Flanagan	24 April 1986
619	Episode 31	Bevan Lee & Gail Meillon	Sean Nash	29 April 1986
620	Episode 32	Neil Luxmoore & Marie Trevor	Sean Nash	1 May 1986
621	Episode 33	Alister Webb	Tony Osicka	6 May 1986
622	Episode 34	John Coulter & Ian Coughlan	Tony Osicka	8 May 1986
623	Episode 35	Andrew Kennedy & Bevan Lee	Alister Smart	13 May 1986
624	Episode 36	Quincey McQuade & John Clifford White	Alister Smart	15 May 1986
625	Episode 37	Ian Coughlan	Kendal Flanagan	20 May 1986
626	Episode 38	Sean Nash & Gail Meillon	Kendal Flanagan	22 May 1986
627	Episode 39	Alister Webb & Andrew Kennedy	Sean Nash	27 May 1986
628	Episode 40	Quincy McQuade & Neil Luxmoore	Sean Nash	3 June 1986
629	Episode 41	Sean Nash	Tony Osicka	5 June 1986
630	Episode 42	Ian Smith & Gail Smith	Tony Osicka	10 June 1986
631	Episode 43	Ian Coughlan	Alister Smart	12 June 1986
632	Episode 44	Kit Oldfield & Marie Trevor	Alister Smart	17 June 1986
633	Episode 45	Quincey McQuade	Alister Smart	19 June 1986
634	Episode 46	John Coulter	Kendal Flanagan	24 June 1986
635	Episode 47	Alister Webb & Andrew Kennedy	Sean Nash	26 June 1986
636	Episode 48	Bevan Lee	Sean Nash	1 July 1986
637	Episode 49	Gail Meillon & Alison Nisselle	Tony Osicka	3 July 1986
638	Episode 50	Ian Smith & Gail Smith	Tony Osicka	8 July 1986
639	Episode 51	Ian Coughlan	Alister Smart	10 July 1986
640	Episode 52	Alister Webb & Neil Luxmoore	Alister Smart	15 July 1986
641	Episode 53	Quincey McQuade	Kendal Flanagan & Tony Osicka	17 July 1986
642	Episode 54	John Coulter & Kit Oldfield	Kendal Flanagan & Tony Osicka	22 July 1986
643	Episode 55	Marie Trevor	Sean Nash	24 July 1986
644	Episode 56	Andrew Kennedy & Sean Nash	Sean Nash	29 July 1986
645	Episode 57	David Stevens	Tony Osicka	31 July 1986
646	Episode 58	Alister Webb & Neil Luxmoore	Tony Osicka	31 July 1986
647	Episode 59	Kit Oldfield & Ian Smith	Steve Mann	5 August 1986
648	Episode 60	Alison Nisselle	Steve Mann	7 August 1986
649	Episode 61	Ian Coughlan	Kendal Flanagan	7 August 1986
650	Episode 62	Andrew Kennedy & Gail Meillon	Kendal Flanagan	12 August 1986
651	Episode 63	Quincey McQuade	Sean Nash	14 August 1986
652	Episode 64	John Coulter & Marie Trevor	Sean Nash	14 August 1986
653	Episode 65	Alister Webb	Tony Osicka	19 August 1986
654	Episode 66	Peter Copeman & Quincey McQuade	Tony Osicka	21 August 1986
655	Episode 67	Ian Smith & Gail Smith	Steve Mann	21 August 1986
656	Episode 68	Alison Nisselle & Neil Luxmoore	Steve Mann	26 August 1986
657	Episode 69	Ian Coughlan & Andrew Kennedy	Kendal Flanagan	28 August 1986
658	Episode 70	Kit Oldfield & Gail Meillon	Kendal Flanagan	28 August 1986
659	Episode 71	Quincey McQuade	Sean Nash	2 September 1986
660	Episode 72	John Coulter & Marie Trevor	Sean Nash	4 September 1986
661	Episode 73	Peter Copeman & Sean Nash	Tony Osicka	4 September 1986
662	Episode 74	Alister Webb	Tony Osicka	9 September 1986
663	Episode 75	Neil Luxmoore & Alison Nisselle	Gary Conway	11 September 1986
664	Episode 76	Ian Smith & Gail Smith	Gary Conway	11 September 1986
665	Episode 77	Ian Coughlan & Gail Meillon	Kendal Flanagan	16 September 1986
666	Episode 78	Robert Greenberg & Andrew Kennedy	Kendal Flanagan	18 September 1986
667	Episode 79	Sean Nash & Peter Copeman	Sean Nash	18 September 1986
668	Episode 80	Quincey McQuade	Sean Nash	25 September 1986
669	Episode 81	Alister Webb & Neil Luxmoore	Tony Osicka	25 September 1986
670	Episode 82	John Coulter & Andrew Kennedy	Tony Osicka	30 September 1986
671	Episode 83	Ian Smith & Gail Smith	Gary Conway	2 October 1986
672	Episode 84	Alison Nisselle & Neil Luxmoore	Gary Conway	2 October 1986
673	Episode 85	Terry Finch & Andrew Kennedy	Kendal Flanagan	7 October 1986
Following Craven’s murder, The Minister demands that Lorelei is sent to a mental institution. Joan orders that the women stick to a new set of harsh rules. Nobody seems to want to be Deputy Governor with Joan in charge so Meg, Joyce and Marty are to be transferred out of Wentworth.
674	Episode 86	Gwenda Marsh & Gail Meillon	Kendal Flanagan	9 October 1986
675	Episode 87	Quincey McQuade & Sean Nash	Sean Nash	9 October 1986
676	Episode 88	Marie Trevor & John Coulter	Sean Nash	14 October 1986
677	Episode 89	Bevan Lee & Ian Coughlan	Tony Osicka	21 October 1986
678	Episode 90	Terry Finch & Robert Greenberg	Tony Osicka	23 October 1986
679	Episode 91	Ian Smith & Alison Nisselle	Chris Sheil	23 October 1986
680	Episode 92	Neil Luxmoore	Chris Sheil	30 October 1986
681	Episode 93	Andrew Kennedy & Ian Coughlan	Kendal Flanagan	30 October 1986
682	Episode 94	Gail Meillon & Gwenda Marsh	Kendal Flanagan	6 November 1986
683	Episode 95	Quincey McQuade	Sean Nash	6 November 1986
684	Episode 96	Michael Joshua & Gwenda Marsh	Sean Nash	11 November 1986
685	Episode 97	Terry Finch	Tony Osicka	13 November 1986
686	Episode 98	John Coulter & Marie Trevor	Tony Osicka	20 November 1986
687	Episode 99	Ian Smith & Alison Nisselle	Chris Sheil	25 November 1986
688	Episode 100	Neil Luxmoore	Chris Sheil	27 November 1986
689	Episode 101	Gwenda Marsh & Sean Nash	Kendal Flanagan	2 December 1986
690	Episode 102	John Coulter & Gail Meillon	Kendal Flanagan	4 December 1986
691	Episode 103	Quincey McQuade	Sean Nash	9 December 1986
Tom pushes Kath to talk to Merle and the pair finally reconcile. Spike receives a visit from her mother, with a little help from Marty, and they make up their differences, before Spike is released from Wentworth. Vicki and Brumby decided to help Rita by making some hash cookies. An outburst from Kath about what life is really like inside prompts The Department to consider Ann’s request for a Prison Reforms program. Rita decides to end her chemotherapy sessions and make the most of whatever time she has left, before the women discover her illness. Joan and Rita put their plan into action when Joan aids her escape.
692	Episode 104	Ian Smith & Marie Trevor	Sean Nash	11 December 1986
Following the escape, Rita heads to the building society where she successfully obtains the money and hides it in a safe place, but is eventually recaptured. She persuades an anxious Joan to collect the money as soon as possible in fear of it being discovered. It’s Rita’s birthday and her friends give her a celebration she’ll never forget; she steps down as top dog and offers the position to Kath. Ann finally receives positive news about the Prison Reforms program. Alice is offered a transfer to Barnhurst to be with Harry, but temporarily declines so that she can be with Rita. The announcement of Rita’s death spreads through Wentworth, leaving both prisoners and staff, including Joan, upset. Joan finally picks up the courage to go and collect the money, but is all what it seems?
