= TV Times (Australia) =

TV Times was a weekly Australian magazine that began publication in Sydney in June 1958. It previewed upcoming television programs, published interviews with television personalities, and printed a full weekly program guide. It merged with rival TV Week in 1980.
