= Val Lehman =

Australian actress and director (born 1943)

Val Lehman AM
- Born: Valerie Kathleen Willis; 15 March 1943 (age 83); Perth, Western Australia
- Occupation: Actress
- Years active: 1967–present
- Known for: Prisoner (also titled Prisoner: Cell Block H)
- Spouses: Frank Lehman; Charles Collins (m. 1989; div. 2002)
- Children: 3

Valerie Kathleen Lehman AM (née Willis; born 15 March 1943) is an Australian actress and director, best known locally and internationally for her role as the protagonist "Top Dog" and self-styled Queen Bea Smith in the Australian TV series Prisoner (known internationally as Prisoner: Cell Block H) for the first five series from 1979 until 1983 for 356 episodes.

== Honours and awards ==
In 2021 she was awarded the Order of Australia (AM) "for significant service to the performing arts and wildlife conservation".

She received three Logie Awards for her performance; Best Lead Actress in a Series, Most Popular Actress in 1982 and Best Lead Actress in a Series in 1983. Lehman decided to leave the series towards the end of season five after becoming tired with playing the character. She recorded her final scenes on 13 May 1983 and made her final appearance in episode 400.

== Career ==
Lehman has appeared in many other Australian television productions, mostly in guest roles. Prior to Prisoner she acted in the television series Bellbird and Tandarra. After Prisoner she appeared in The Flying Doctors, Army Wives, Something in the Air, Blue Heelers, All Saints and City Homicide.

In 2016, Lehman was a contestant on the Australian version of I'm a Celebrity...Get Me Out of Here!. On 6 March 2016 she was evicted from the jungle.

Lehman had a guest role on Neighbours in December 2017 as Joanne Schwartz, which reunited her with her former Prisoner co-star Colette Mann.

In 2018, Lehman joined former Prisoner co-stars Fiona Spence and Colette Mann for a cameo appearance in the series seven finale of Wentworth (TV series), but the cameo scene was scrapped when the series was renewed for a further 20 episodes.

== Filmography ==
=== Television ===
Title	Year	Role	Network	Notes
1967	Bellbird	Guest appearance	ABC	TV series
1972	Homicide	Nurse	Seven Network	TV series, Season 9, 1 episode
1976	Tandarra	Dinner Guest	Seven Network	TV series, 1 episode
1976	Power Without Glory	Woman in Lane	ABC	TV miniseries
1979–1983	Prisoner	Bea Smith	Network Ten	TV series, Seasons 1–5, 376 episodes
1981	Prisoner in Concert	Herself / Bea Smith	Network Ten	TV special (Cast performance at Pentridge prison)
1981	Outbreak of Love	Mrs. Montaubyn	ABC	TV miniseries
1983	Parkinson In Australia	Guest	Network 10	TV series, 1 episode
1985	The Ernie Sigley Show	Guest	Nine Network	TV series, 1 episode
1985	A Fortunate Life	Bert's Mother	Nine Network	TV miniseries
1986	The Flying Doctors	Val Bates	Nine Network	TV miniseries, 1 episode
1994	Ken Dodd: An Audience with Ken Dodd	Audience member (uncredited)		TV special UK
1994	Law of the Land	Fran Weber	Nine Network	TV series, Season 3, 1 episode
1996	Wilderness	Vet	ITV	TV miniseries UK
1998	Good Guys, Bad Guys	Rose Kinsella	Nine Network	TV series, Season 2, 1 episode
1998; 2001	Blue Heelers	Bonnie Crossing	Seven Network	TV series, Season 5, 1 episode
2000	Pizza	Bea Smith	SBS	TV series, season 1, 1 episode
2000–2002	Something in the Air	Joyce Cassidy	ABC	Seasons 1 & 3, 5 episodes
2001	Blue Heelers	Ivy Henderson	Seven Network	TV series, Season 8, 1 episode
2002	MDA	Rita O'Reilly	ABC	TV series, Season 1, 1 episode
2009	All Saints	Maggie Brooks	Seven Network	TV series, Season 12, 1 episode
2010	City Homicide	Dorothy Denzel	Seven Network	TV series, Season 4, 1 episode
2012	The Strange Calls	Elaine	ABC2	TV miniseries, 1 episode
2014	Secrets & Lies	Patricia	Network Ten	TV series, Season 1, 1 episode
2017	Neighbours	Joanne Schwarz	10 Peach	TV series, Season 33, 2 episodes
2019	Wentworth	New Prisoner	Fox Showcase	Season 7 (cameo, scene deleted)
2020	The End	Kelly	Showcase	Season 1 (recurring, 4 episodes)
2022	Irreverent	Delaney	Netflix	TV series, Season 1, 10 episodes

=== Film ===
Title	Year	Role	Notes
1977	The Idyll		Short film
1979	The Dolebludgers	Mrs. Price	TV movie
1979	The Franky Doyle Story	Bea Smith	TV movie
1982	Kitty and the Bagman	Big Lil	Feature film
1985	I Live with Me Dad	Marge	TV movie
1987	Army Wives	Jill's Mother	TV movie
2002	Secret Bridesmaids' Business	Colleen	TV movie
2008	Smitten	Violet	Short film
2008	Lapse	Rose	Short film
2009	Charlie & Boots	Bowling Lady Driver	Feature film
2017	The Veiled	Edith	Short film
2018	Holt	Old Vyner Gillespie	Short film
2022	The Curious Case of Dolphin Bay	Wendy	Feature film
2022	Hitched	The Boss Lady	Short film

=== Other appearances ===
Year	Title	Role	Notes	
2016	I'm a Celebrity...Get Me Out of Here!	Contestant	Network Ten	TV series, 31 episodes
2016	All Star Family Feud	Contestant	Network Ten	TV series, 1 episode
2009	9am with David & Kim	Guest (with Amanda Muggleton & Peta Toppano)	Network Ten	TV series, 1 episode
2008	What a Year	Herself	Nine Network	TV series, 1 episode
2007	20 to 1	Herself	Nine Network	TV series, 1 episode
2007	Bert's Family Feud	Contestant	Nine Network	TV series, 1 episode
2006	Temptation	Contestant with Colette Mann	Nine Network	TV series, 1 episode
2006	Where Are They Now?	Guest (with Prisoner cast: Peta Toppano, Amanda Muggleton, Carol Burns & Maggie Kirkpatrick)	Seven Network	TV series, 1 episode
2005	After They Were Famous	Guest		TV series UK, 1 episode
2003	The Salon	Herself		TV series UK, 1 episode
2002	The Best of Aussie Cop Shows	Herself	Seven Network	TV special
2001	I Love the 1980's	Herself		TV series UK
1998	The Big Breakfast	Herself		TV series UK
1998	Denise	Herself	Seven Network	TV series, 1 episode
1997	Where Are They Now?	Guest (with Carol Burns, Gerard Maguire, Lynne Hamilton & Lynda Stoner)	Seven Network	TV series, 1 episode
1996	40 Years of TV Stars... Then and Now	Herself	Nine network	TV special
1995	Burke's Backyard	Celebrity Gardener	Nine network	TV series, 1 episode
1995	Sale of the Century: Battle of the TV Classics	Guest	Nine network	TV series, 1 episode
1991	Ring My Bell	Guest		TV series UK
1990	The Great Escape	Guest		Video UK
1989	TV AM	Guest (with Carol Burns & Fiona Spence)	BBC1	TV series UK, 1 episode
1989	In Melbourne Today	Guest - Herself	Nine network	TV series, 1 episode
1989	The Bert Newton Show	Guest - Herself with Bruce Ruxton, Sings "Flottsam Jettsam" (from 'Bea') with Jon Finlayson	Seven Network	TV series, 1 episode
1986	Kids 21st Birthday Channel Ten Telethon	Guest - Herself as taped appearance with Prisoner cast: Colette Mann, Elspeth Ballantyne, Glenda Linscott & Jane Clifton	TV special	

== Awards and honours ==
Association	Award	Year	Work	Results
Logie Awards	Best Lead Actress in a Series	1982	Prisoner (Season 3)	Won
Logie Awards	Most Popular Actress	1982	Prisoner (Season 3)	Won
Logie Awards	Best Lead Actress in a Series	1983	Prisoner (Season 4)	Won
Australian Government	Member of the Order of Australia	2021		Honoured
