= Kylie Foster =

Australian actress (born 1961)

- Born: 3 March 1961 (age 65); Katoomba, New South Wales, Australia
- Occupations: Actress, model
- Years active: 1979–present

Kylie Foster (born 3 March 1961) is an Australian actress and model. She made her screen debut in 1979 as Belinda Phipps in Skyways. That same year, she modelled for Australian Playboy and Penthouse magazines. Following a guest appearance in Cop Shop in 1980, Foster made her feature film debut in the Ozploitation film Centrespread. She followed this with a second feature film Kitty and the Bagman (1983). Foster went on to play inmate Angela "Angel" Adams in Prisoner in 1984. The character helped her break free of being typecast in "nice" roles. The following year, she played the "conniving" Wendy Gibson in Neighbours. Foster has also guested in Rafferty's Rules and Home and Away. She appeared in the 1990 film Quigley Down Under, and had a recurring role in the 1991 British comedy series Boys from the Bush.

== Early and personal life ==
Foster was born on 3 March 1961 in Katoomba, New South Wales. Her grandmother Marjorie Pearl was an actress, while her great-grandmother Esther Rose modelled for Norman Lindsay. After leaving home when she was 16 years old, Foster and a friend enrolled in a June Dally-Watkins course. After graduating, Foster was asked to stay on as a model. She appeared in numerous photographic work and commercials for products such as Fanta, milk and swimsuits. Foster also completed an Arts Council course in acting, and concentrated on mime.

Foster was in a relationship with Nigel Griggs, bass player for rock band Split Enz. The pair, who had a 12 year age gap, met through a mutual friend in 1979. Foster is the co-photographer for Book Enz, a photobook about the band.

== Career ==
Foster made her acting debut in the Seven Network serial drama Skyways in 1979, as the "sweet and innocent" receptionist Belinda Phipps. Foster said she was "delighted" when Crawford Productions chose her for the role, and she relocated to Melbourne for filming. Foster modelled for the centrefold of Australian Playboy in 1979 when she was 19. She also modelled for Penthouse magazine, but the ten-page spread was published without her permission. Foster said that she was meant to be told about it and felt "a bit cheated". Foster made a guest appearance in two episodes of Cop Shop in early September 1980.

In 1981, Foster made her feature film debut in Centrespread. She thought the chance to appear in her first lead role was something she could not pass up, and she believed it helped her develop as an actress. The Ozploitation film features many nude scenes and while Foster did not regret working on it, the business side of the shoot left her "distrusting". Production on the film was meant to last for three weeks, however, Foster was asked to return and shoot some extra scenes. Ten months later she still had not been paid. Foster admitted that things could have been cleared up quicker if she had an agent. Foster's second film Kitty and the Bagman was released in 1983. She plays Salvation Army girl Sarah Jones, alongside John Stanton, Liddy Clark and Val Lehman.

Foster played Angela "Angel" Adams in Prisoner for 13 weeks in 1984. The role gave Foster the chance to be "a bit nasty" and break free of being typecast for "nice" parts. In addition to her back-stabbing, Angela grows jealous of Meg Morris (Elspeth Ballantyne) and blackmails a friend into raping her. Jenny Cooney of TV Week called Angela " a monstrous character". Foster found the role challenging, but she also called it the best part she had ever had. She also hoped her stint in Prisoner would give her the confidence to try stage work.

In 1985, Foster played the recurring role of Wendy Gibson in the Australian soap opera Neighbours. She was reunited with her friend and Prisoner co-star Maxine Klibingaitis, who played Terry Inglis. Foster said she Klibingaitis regretted that their characters did not like each other. Foster described Wendy as "a conniving 16-year-old who looks set to grow into a real witch." She also commented that she could not think of one good thing about Wendy, who spends her time lying and breaking up with various boys. Foster was 25 when she played the 16 year old character.

In 1988, Foster guested in a Season 4 episode of Rafferty's Rules as Simone Andre. The following year, she had a recurring role on Home and Away as Leanne Dunn. In 1990, she appeared in the action-thriller film Quigley Down Under. She also had a recurring role as Heidi in the British comedy series Boys from the Bush. Foster appears in the 2011 comedy film Boronia Boys.
