= Kitty and the Bagman =

- Directed by: Donald Crombie
- Screenplay by: John Burney; Philip Cornford
- Produced by: Anthony Buckley
- Starring: John Stanton; Liddy Clark; Val Lehman; Colette Mann; Gerard Maguire; Kylie Foster
- Cinematography: Dean Semler
- Music by: Brian May
- Production company: Adams-Packer
- Distributed by: Umbrella Entertainment
- Release date: 1983
- Country: Australia
- Language: English
- Budget: A$2.5 million (est)
- Box office: A$58,407 (Australia)

Kitty and the Bagman is a 1983 Australian film about gangsters in the 1920s. It was based on the rivalry of Kate Leigh and Tilly Devine.

== Premise ==
Kitty O'Rourke arrives in Australia from England as a war bride. Her husband is arrested by a Sydney policeman known as the bagman. This leads Kitty to a life of crime and a rivalry with another female criminal.

== Cast ==
- Liddy Clark as Kitty O'Rourke
- John Stanton as The Bagman
- Val Lehman as 'Big' Lil Delaney
- Gerard Maguire as Cyril
- Colette Mann as Doris de Salle
- Paul Chubb as Slugger
- Danny Adcock as Thomas
- David Bradshaw
- Anthony Hawkins as Simon Mornington
- John Ewart as The Train Driver
- Terry Camilleri as Railway Detective

Several of the cast had been in the TV series Prisoner.

== Production ==
Most of the film was shot on sets at the Mort Bay studios in Balmain, New South Wales. Filming started November 1981. The set was auctioned off afterwards.

During filming a visit was paid to the set by then-treasurer John Howard and then-Prime Minister Malcolm Fraser. The film was completed in 1982 but its release was held back a year.

Director Donald Crombie looked back on the film with mixed emotion:

That probably shouldn't have been made. It was a bit of an aberration. That only got made because we were flush with funds. That was when it became ridiculously easy to make films... There were better things we should have been doing with our time.

== Reception ==
Reviews were mixed.

== Home media ==
Kitty and the Bagman was released on DVD by Umbrella Entertainment in October 2011. The DVD is compatible with all region codes.
