= The Zoo (Australian TV series) =

- Genre: Reality / Factual
- Narrated by: Melissa Doyle
- Country of origin: Australia
- Original language: English
- No. of seasons: 4
- No. of episodes: 30

Production
- Production location: Australia
- Running time: 30 mins (inc. commercials)

Original release
- Network: Seven Network
- Release: 3 February 2008 – 2010

The Zoo is the Australian version of a New Zealand documentary television series of the same name. Centred on the lives of a zoo team at Taronga Zoo, New South Wales. The program is narrated by Sunrise co-host Melissa Doyle.

The first series of 6 episodes aired on Sunday nights from 3 February to 9 March 2008. The second series moved to Tuesday nights at 7:30 pm from 21 October 2008 and finished on 18 November 2008. The 3rd series airing back on the same time slot as series 2 on 12 May 2009. A fourth season began with a special one-hour episode, Miracle At The Zoo on the birth of elephant Pathi Harn on 12 April 2010.

== Miracle at the zoo ==
The Zoo's series four premiere began with an hour special about the first birth of an elephant at Taronga Zoo. The episode aired on 12 April 2010. The show focused on the growth and development of the baby, named "Pathi Harn", in the first few weeks after birth. The special was a huge success coming in first in the nights ratings and giving The Zoo's biggest ratings since series two.

== Awards ==
- 2010 – Logie Awards – Most Popular TV Presenter – Melissa Doyle

== Ratings ==
=== Series ratings ===
Season	Episodes	Series timeslot	Average audience	Average yearly ranking
2	6	Tuesday 7:30pm	1,688,000	#4
3	9	Tuesday 7:30pm	1,475,000	#12

=== Series 3 ===
#	AU Air Date	Timeslot	Viewers (m)	Weekly Rank (#)
1	12 May 2009	7:30pm Tuesday	1.418	#9
2	19 May 2009	7:30pm Tuesday	1.476	#8
3	21 May 2009	7:30pm Tuesday	1.465	#12
4	2 June 2009	7:30pm Tuesday	1.472	#9
5	9 June 2009	7:30pm Tuesday	1.470	#9
6	16 June 2009	7:30pm Tuesday	1.487	#9
7	23 June 2009	7:30pm Tuesday	1.341	#14
8	30 June 2009	7:30pm Tuesday	1.519	#11
9	7 July 2009	7:30pm Tuesday	1.618	#6

=== Series 4 ===
#	AU Air Date	Timeslot	Viewers (m)	Weekly Rank (#)
1	12 April 2010	7:30pm Monday	1.507	#8
2	19 April 2010	7:30pm Monday	0.861	#57
3	26 April 2010	7:30pm Monday	0.952	#41
4	3 May 2010	7:30pm Monday	0.951	#43
5	10 May 2010	7:30pm Monday	0.615	#90
6	17 May 2010	7:30pm Monday	0.921	#50
7	24 May 2010	7:30pm Monday	0.890	#56
8	31 May 2010	7:30pm Monday	0.792	#64
9	7 June 2010	7:30pm Monday	0.866	TBA
