= List of Prisoner characters – inmates =

Prisoner (also known as Prisoner: Cell Block H in the United States and Britain, and Caged Women in Canada) is an Australian television soap opera, which was broadcast on Network Ten from 1979 until 1987. The following is a list of inmates of the fictional Wentworth Detention Centre. Episode numbers cited are first and last appearances; many characters were absent for long periods of time before returning. Character appearances in recaps are not included if they died in the previous episode, unless their body is seen at the beginning of the next episode (for example, Paddy Lawson).

Episodes	Character	Actor	Description
Episode 1	Sally Lee	Lisa Aldenhoven	The first prisoner seen in the series, chased through the corridors by officers Meg Jackson and Vera Bennett after a bad reaction to drugs supplied by "bent screw" Ann Yates. Later in the episode, Sally hangs herself in her cell. The series' first halfway house is named in her honour.
Episodes 1–20	Frieda Joan "Franky" Doyle	Carol Burns	A lesbian bikie who has ferocious outbursts when angry, Franky's violent attitude stems in part from her illiteracy. She falls in love with fellow inmate Karen Travers (who is uncomfortable with her advances), but they become friends when Karen begins teaching Franky how to read. Popular with viewers, Franky appears in only the first 20 episodes; Carol Burns left when the series was extended beyond sixteen episodes. After her brother Gary (Greg Stroud) is killed in a tractor accident and she misinterprets Karen's friendship, Franky escapes with Doreen and Lizzie. Lizzie is forced to turn back because of her weak heart, but Franky and Doreen pose as nuns before Franky is shot dead by a police officer.
Episodes 1–80	Karen Mary Travers	Peita Toppano	Karen Travers is a middle-class school-teacher who stabbed her abusive, adulterous husband to death. She initially offers little defence for her actions, and receives a life sentence. In addition to the physical and mental abuse she refused to report, she returned from the abortion her husband forced her to have to find him in bed with another woman; her sentence is reduced to two years. Karen is reunited with her former boyfriend, prison doctor Greg Miller, but they grow apart. She has a day release to attend university, and has a brief relationship with lawyer Steve Wilson. Karen is paroled and befriended by prisoner-rights advocate Angela Jeffries (Jeanie Drynan), who puts her in charge of the series' first halfway house; Doreen Anderson is the first tenant. Greg declares his love for her, and they resume their relationship. Karen is shot by Pat O'Connell's son David, who believes that Greg was responsible for his mother's re-arrest and mistakenly shoots Karen. With Karen narrowly escaping death, Greg plans for them to start afresh in Queensland; he makes a brief appearance in episode 107, saying that Karen is recovering well and they are now married.
Episodes 1–44	Lynnette Jane "Lynn" Warner	Kerry Armstrong	A young, naïve country girl who came to the city to work as a nanny, Lynn arrives at Wentworth proclaiming her innocence for kidnapping the baby in her care and burying him alive. She is introduced to the other inmates' attitude to child abuse when Bea Smith "accidentally" burns her hand with the steam press. Lynn is called "Wonk" by some of the other women, especially Doreen, because she is perceived as mentally unbalanced. The child's mother had buried the child alive, and Lynn is cleared. She elopes from her parents' farm with ex-convict Doug Parker, and is reluctantly involved with an armed hold-up in which Doug is killed. Lynn returns to Wentworth, and miscarries the baby conceived when she was raped as a nanny. She is part of the new work-release program, working during the day at a local garden centre for Syd Butterfield (Alan Rowe). Lynn becomes close to Syd's son Geoffrey (David Cameron), to Syd's chagrin. Doreen (who has developed a crush on Lynn) plants contraband letters on her, jeopardising her work release and parole. Lynn is kidnapped on her release day by thugs who confuse her with Monica Ferguson, who is released the same day and knows the whereabouts of some stolen loot. After being rescued by the police, she returns to her parents' farm.
Episodes 1–16	Gladys Anne "Marilyn" Mason	Margaret Laurence	The prison nymphomaniac, inside for soliciting and memorable for her assignations with electrician Eddie Cook (Richard Moir) on the prison roof. She moves in with Eddie, determined to get a decent job and go straight, but reluctantly turns back to prostitution; she breaks up with Eddie and returns to Wentworth. Bea sets Marilyn and Eddie straight, convincing Monica Ferguson to let them run her milk bar; Monica later sells them the shop.
Episodes 1–446	Doreen May Anderson (later Burns)	Colette Mann	A childish, easily-led but generally well-meaning prisoner who is briefly involved in a sexual relationship with Franky Doyle. Thumb-sucking, teddy-bear-clutching Doreen was a petty criminal, in and out of juvenile institutions, before ending up at Wentworth with a talent for forgery. After Franky's death, she became tough and butch (like Franky) before becoming close friends with Lizzie and Bea. She was released twice; after her first release she is arrested for stealing, and after her second release she steals Chrissie's baby from the hospital. Doreen marries Kevin Burns, but they divorce soon after she is raped during a work-release scheme. Suicidal after her divorce, she is the first victim of Joan Ferguson's "black-glove" body search. During Bea's escape, Doreen puts her up in Sydney.
Episodes 1–418	Elizabeth Josephine "Lizzie" Birdsworth	Sheila Florance	An elderly, chain-smoking, alcoholic recidivist prisoner who provided much of the series' comic relief. At the beginning, Lizzie had already served twenty years in prison. A bush cook, she allegedly poisoned six sheep shearers who complained about her cooking; four died. It was later learned that someone else had added the fatal dose of poison to the food (she put in enough to make them sick); Lizzie is released, and receives compensation. Ill-equipped for the outside, she commits a series of crimes and returns to Wentworth. Josie and her daughter Marcia, looking for money, pretend to be Lizzie's family; although she knows that they are not, she wants to spend time with them. Marcia tells Lizzie that she was her daughter's best friend at the orphanage and Lizzie's (real) daughter died in a car crash. Marcia and Josie later go to the United States for Josie to have an operation. Lizzie, always wearing a red cardigan given to her by Erica Davidson, has several several heart attacks and is released to be with the Charltons (her real family).
Episodes 1–400	Beatrice Alice "Bea" Smith	Val Lehman	The first top dog (the unofficial leader of the prisoners), who rules H Block with an iron fist. Bea is initially imprisoned for strangling her husband's mistress, and shoots her cheating husband dead when she is released. Her teenage daughter, Debbie, (played by Lehman's daughter, Cassandra) died from a heroin overdose while Bea was in prison after her husband threw her out. Bea was hates drug pushers and child abusers, and tries to help a fellow inmate overcome her drug addiction. She and Chrissie Latham, enemies at first, become allies against Margo Gaffney. Bea is Joan Ferguson's first of three enemies. Any chance of her parole ends after she shoots and kills Nola Mckenzie in a hospital bed. Bea escapes three times, although the second escape is unplanned. She is transferred to Barnhurst, and dies in a fire there.
Episodes 1–204	Jeanette Mary "Mum" Brooks	Mary Ward	An elderly, dignified long-term inmate who works in the prison garden, loved and respected by prisoners and officers, "Mum" euthanised her terminally-ill husband and had served fifteen years at the start of the series. She helps accustom newcomers to Wentworth to prison routine. Mum is released, but has nowhere to live; after briefly living with her unwelcoming daughter, Lorraine Watkins (Anne Charleston), she shoplifts to get sent back to Wentworth. She is again released under the care of new parole officer Jean Vernon, who sets her up in a little flat with her pregnant granddaughter Judith-Ann (Kim Deacon). Mum is written out of the series, since Ward did not want to commit to an ongoing series. Mum and Judith-Ann return when they unwittingly become involved with the escaped Bea. Mum, in poor health, is working hard before Judith-Ann's imminent birth. Meg (who is visiting Mum) convinces Greg to tend to her, and he convinces Karen (now released) to stay with Mum and Judith-Ann until the child is born. Mum's estranged daughter (now played by Gabrielle Hartley) re-appears and, after seeing Judith-Ann's baby, asks Judith-Ann and Mum to live with her. After another brief stint at Wentworth for aiding Bea, she dies of a heart attack and leaves $20,000 to the prisoners.
Episodes 2–73	Rosie Hudson	Anne-Maree McDonald	A young prisoner who is pregnant at the start of the series and gives birth during the riot in episodes 3–4. After giving birth, Rosie is moved to the maternity block. With her baby approaching his first birthday, she is in denial that he will be placed with foster parents. Rosie has a breakdown; during a security alert, she punches the pregnant Chrissie in the stomach (endangering Chrissie's baby) and is placed under psychiatric care.
Episodes 2–692	Lorna Young	Barbara Jungwirth	One of the longest-serving background characters, she appears regularly throughout the series. Her first speaking contribution is in episode 120, the first time she is called by name.
Episodes 2–692	Tina Murray	Hazel Henley	One of the background characters, but not always with this name; she is first called "Murray" in episode 206.
Episodes 3–338	Christine Angela "Chrissie" Latham	Amanda Muggleton	A lascivious sex worker who spends much of her time lamenting the fact that there were no men around, Chrissie kills Bill Jackson (Meg's husband) during the series' first riot. She returns in episode 65 after being in Barnhurst, where it is discovered that she became pregnant. Chrissie keeps the baby to avoid a bashing from Bea; her daughter, Elizabeth (named after Lizzie Birdsworth), becomes her main focus and she turns over a new leaf. Whilst trying to keep Elizabeth from being put into homes, Chrissie tries a number of stunts (including running away interstate with Elizabeth). When she returns to Wentworth, Joan Ferguson tells her that she will provide bad character references at a custody hearing. Chrissie lashes out, and is hospitalised by "the Freak's" first real bashing. First an enemy of Bea Smith, she becomes one of Bea's allies. Chrissie is eventually transferred back to Barnhurst.
Episodes 8–10	Helen Masters	Louise Pajo	An international businesswoman, well-known in the media due to her cosmetics enterprise, who is remanded to Wentworth for killing a child in a hit-and-run. She denies all involvement and is found innocent, although it is revealed that she was driving while intoxicated. Her haughty attitude alienates staff and prisoners. She subsequently wins over many of the prisoners (including Bea), demanding better conditions and promising to campaign for them. In a television interview after she is released she turns on the prisoners, saying that they deserve what they get.
Episodes 15–60	Monica "Monnie" Ferguson	Lesley Baker	Imprisoned for bashing her husband Fred (Gary Files) and a friend of Bea Smith from another prison, she takes over as top dog after Bea escapes. Monica is paroled, and again bashes Fred when she learns that he was unfaithful to her. Meg Jackson defends her to Erica Davidson, who releases Monica to start afresh in another state.
Episodes 17–24	Barbara Davidson	Sally Cahill	The niece of governor Erica Davidson, admitted to Wentworth on drug charges, has a seemingly-innocent persona covering the fact that she is calculating and sly. She strikes up a partnership with Vera which includes framing Monica Ferguson for drug possession. Barbara is transferred to Barnhurst after Doreen's bullying pushes her to douse her cell in petrol and threaten to set herself alight, leading Erica to realise that it is unrealistic to have a close relative in Wentworth without the risk of special treatment or bullying.
Episodes 18–24	Catherine Roberts	Margo McLennan	A middle-class housewife who runs down and kills the man who raped her teenage daughter. After she is sentenced (striking up a friendship with), the character disappears and is said in episode 28 to have been moved to another block.
Episodes 21–460	Phyllis Hunt	Reylene Pearce	A background prisoner who takes on a larger role around the time of Bea Smith's departure from the series, turning nasty in the process. After Phyllis messes up Reb's drugs scheme at the Wentworth Fete, Reb bashes her with a wooden statue and inflicts brain damage.
Episodes 25–29	Susan Rice	Briony Behets	An emotionally-fragile woman sent to Wentworth for shoplifting. As Meg Jackson becomes concerned about her mental state, it becomes apparent that Susan is angry at pop star Jason Richards for taking her husband Fredrick away from her and destroying their marriage. Richards is actually Fredrick's stage name, and they are the same person. Susan invades a TV interview with "Richards" when she is released, throwing acid in his face before being taken to a secure psychiatric unit.
Episodes 29–64	Martha Eaves	Kate Jason	A dimwitted, burly prisoner who is ridiculed by the other women, but is hired muscle for wannabe top dogs or those needing physical back-up. Martha tries to befriend child murderer Bella Albrecht, who is loathed by the other women. After Martha overhears Bella saying that she thinks Martha is stupid, she drowns her in the shower block. She starts working for criminal mastermind Antonia McNally, who uses Martha's muscle to take over Bea's position while Bea is in solitary.
Episodes 30–132	Noeline Burke	Jude Kuring	The head of a family of petty criminals, usually inside for burglary and theft. An antagonist of Bea Smith and Monica Ferguson, Noeline refused to take anything she considered charity: "the Burkes don't take charity; we just take". When she returns to Wentworth, she blames the officers and does not understand that it was an accident. Noeline is later transferred to Barnhurst for her own safety.
Episodes 30–39	Clara Goddard	Betty Lucas	A genteel, flighty socialite who plans to start a halfway house for ex-prisoners, Clara is remanded to Wentworth for embezzlement. She influences the women, especially in the escaped Bea's absence. Clara is called "Madame Clara" and "Tinkerbell" by Bea when she returns. She is moved to a dedicated remand section at a prison with better facilities.
Episodes 30–149	Kathleen Leach	Penny Stewart	Originally a background prisoner (often uncredited), Kathleen shares a cell with Ros Coulson while Ros plans to escape with terrorist Janet Dominguez and unsuccessfully tries to talk her out of it. She is released and returns for a short sentence for prostitution, but has been planted by Tracey Morris' "boyfriend" Joe to ensure that Tracey will not testify against him. Tracey realises that Joe has been using her, and Kathleen is ordered to kill her. She goes to Bea for help, and Bea purposely scalds Kathleen's hand in the laundry steam press (sending her to hospital, unable to carry out the order).
Episodes 33–121	Leanne Burke	Tracey-Jo Riley	Noeline Burke's daughter, who has inherited her mother's criminal tendencies, is first seen visiting Noeline with her rather slow brother Col (Brian Granrott) and telling her about the problems they are facing without her. After Noeline's release, she and Leanne are caught trying to rob a building. Leanne is not charged but Noeline is again sent to Wentworth, and Leanne meets welfare officer Jean Vernon. Jean gives her the address of the apartment she shares with Meg and Leanne robs the place with Denny (Tony Mahood), a young man she has met. Jean remains determined to set Leanne on the straight and narrow, and convinces Meg to let her move in with them while they find her a steady job. Leanne abuses this trust (infuriating Meg), and Jean keeps convincing Meg to give Leanne one more chance until Leanne and Denny are caught trying to hold up a service station. Leanne later arrives at Wentworth, charged with petty larceny. She becomes fast friends with Judy, and helps arrange the riot demanding that murderous officer Jock Stewart be brought to justice. With the riot on the prison roof, Leanne falls to her death while trying to wave a banner for gathering media to see.
Episodes 38–40	Irene Zervos	Maria Mercedes	A young Greek woman admitted to Wentworth after being blackmailed into prostitution by a relative who is aware of her status as an illegal immigrant; her brother and his wife are also illegal immigrants. Irene does not speak English, and Karen (with only a smattering of basic Greek) tries to interpret for her. Upon her release, she is arrested by federal authorities at the prison gate due to her illegal status.
Episodes 40–48	Joyce Martin	Judy Nunn	The wife of an armed robber inside for being an accessory, and the only person who knows the location of the loot. After her husband tries to have her abducted from the prison grounds and forced to reveal the loot's location, Joyce makes a deal with Monica (who is due for release) to retrieve the stash in return for a cut. Heavies hired by Joyce's husband try to snatch Monica but mistakenly grab Lynn, who is released the same day. The loot is recovered when Jim Fletcher double-crosses Denise Crabtree to a hidden key, and Joyce is moved to D Block.
Episodes 43–48	Denise "Blossom" Crabtree	Lynda Keane	A tarty young woman, the girlfriend of Monica Ferguson's husband Fred, who is using him to get the loot from the robbery by Joyce Martin's husband. When she winds up in Wentworth, Monica is angry to find that she has been having an affair with Fred. When Denise is released, she tries to seduce Jim Fletcher into helping her get the key hidden in the prison; Jim double-crosses her, and hands the loot to the police.
Episodes 44–49	Edith "Edie" Wharton	Colleen Clifford	An elderly, kindly woman who becomes homeless with her partner, Horrie. Horrie dies after they spend a night sleeping rough; Edie is charged with vagrancy and vandalising the shelter which refused to take them in, and ends up in Wentworth. Deputy governor Jim Fletcher goes out of his way to see that she is comfortable and cared-for. Lizzie and Edie become fast friends, and they enjoy talking about the old days. Edie does not want to leave Wentworth for the shabby bedsit Jean Vernon has arranged and dies in her sleep the night before she is due for release, leaving Lizzie to contemplate the prospect of also dying in prison. With no relatives or estate to pay for Edie's funeral, Jim Fletcher quietly steps in to pay for the funeral out of the reward for recovering Joyce Martin's stolen loot.
Episodes 47–58	Melinda Cross	Lulu Pinkus	A devious young woman who is a student at Karen's university who tries to blackmail Tom (Hu Pryce), her lecturer with whom she has been having an affair. When Tom's wife finds out, she informs the police. After being caught receiving a pay-off, Melinda is arrested and sent to Wentworth to await trial. She is pregnant with Tom's child, and escapes conviction by convincing the judge that she was only acting out of desperation. After her release, she tells Greg that she perjured herself and plans to have an abortion. The newly released Karen briefly moves in with Melinda before Melinda has an abortion under Karen's name.
Episodes 51–52	Bella Swan Albrecht	Liddy Clark	A remorseless child-killer who had murdered her toddler daughter and arrives at Wentworth on remand. The officers try to keep her crime under wraps (knowing it will anger the other women, who despise people who harm children), but word soon leaks out after Bea dupes visiting psychologist Peter Clements into revealing why Bella is in Wentworth. Although Bella tries to befriend Karen, her only friend is the lonely Martha Eaves (who drowns her in a shower-block wash basin).
Episodes 57–64	Antonia "Toni" McNally	Pat Bishop	A cool, classy woman on remand for the murder of the woman who was having an affair with her husband, and who tries to buy the women's favour (and take over as top dog) while Bea Smith is in solitary confinement. Toni is married to the head of the local underworld, with friends in high places (pulling strings to have Jim Fletcher placed on leave to get him off her back), and governor Erica Davidson is pressured to give her special privileges. She starts smuggling contraband (including booze and drugs), and hires Martha Eaves as her muscle and lackey. When Bea is released from solitary, they briefly strike up an uneasy alliance until Bea learns that Toni has been smuggling drugs and they begin a power struggle. Erica is on temporary leave, and the other women begin to side with Bea against Vera Bennett and Jim Fletcher (now in charge of the prison). Toni is acquitted after thugs hired by her intimidate the only witness into making a false statement. Walking free from court, she is shot by Ros Coulson (daughter of the woman Toni killed) and dies.
Episodes 63–92	Roslyn Louise "Ros" Coulson	Sigrid Thornton	An idealistic young woman in her last year at convent school who claims to be a relative of Toni McNally, Ros is the daughter of the woman Toni murdered. She fatally shoots Toni when she is acquitted, seeing it as justified. Ros's attitude changes after she is sentenced, since she believes she has done nothing wrong. She orchestrates an escape, arranging a distraction which allows her to stow away in a visiting van. Ros seeks refuge at the newly-opened halfway house, but (despite Doreen's pleas) Karen turns her away; if they were found harbouring a fugitive, the project would be destroyed. Ros tries the brothel where her late mother worked, but when an associate of Toni tries to force her into prostitution, she flees and is soon captured. Back in Wentworth she is won over by terrorist Janet Dominguez, who plans to escape and offers to take Ros with her in return for Ros's help. The terrorist break-out fails; Ros saves Erica Davidson from being fatally shot, and escapes on her own. After a tip-off from Chrissie, she is re-captured. Ros (encouraged by Erica) begins to see that her attitude will not get her anywhere, and begins studying under the guidance of welfare officer Paul Reid. Erica has her moved to a quieter block with other studying prisoners.
Episodes 65–110	Patricia Mary Theresa "Pat" O'Connell	Monica Maughan	A level-headed, kindhearted middle-aged mother who is transferred from Barnhurst with Chrissie Latham, Pat is inside for aiding and abetting her criminal husband in an armed robbery. Forced to divorce her husband for a better chance of keeping her children, she is determined to keep out of trouble so that she might be paroled by Christmas and reunited with her son and daughter. Despite jeopardising her parole by meeting with her eldest son, David (who is also in prison and visiting Wentworth on a work party), Pat is paroled and reunited with her youngest children for Christmas. David escapes from prison around this time, which leads to a police shoot-out when he tries to visit her; Pat is returned to Wentworth because the police are convinced that she was in cahoots with David. David is convinced that Greg Miller informed the police, prompting him to shoot Greg and wounding Karen in error. Unable to cope in prison, David kills himself. Pat insists that Bea not attack the pregnant Chrissie and, with Doreen and Lizzie on release, becomes Bea's main sidekick. She is released when her sentence is reduced on appeal; on parole, she is last seen when Paul Reid drives her home with her kids.
Episodes 79–83	Janet Rose Dominguez	Deidre Rubenstein	A terrorist brought to Wentworth, awaiting extradition to the US to face charges in connection with the bombing of a South American official outside the UN building. In solitary because the officers do not want her interacting with (or influencing) the other women, she wins over Ros Coulson. Ros helps an escape, and is given sleep powder to drug the guards while armed terrorists break into the prison to free Janet. The break-out does not go according to plan, and Dominguez is shot and injured trying to escape.
Episodes 89–114	Caroline Margaret Simpson	Rosalind Speirs	Arrives at the Halfway House with her fragile mother, Vivienne, who is seeking shelter from her abusive husband but is turned away. When her father threatens to kill her mother with a shotgun, Caroline fatally stabs him. She convinces Vivienne that they must say that intruders killed him, but their story is exposed and they end up in Wentworth awaiting trial. Jim Fletcher is interested in Caroline (reinforcing his nickname "Fletch the Letch"), but Caroline does not return his advances. Her estranged, possessive ex-husband Michael (Peter Ford) offers to pay bail, but she refuses to accept his terms; he sees Jim as coming between them. Jim also offers to pay bail but Caroline refuses, not wanting to be in his debt; when Vivienne's health worsens, she agrees. Caroline moves into the halfway house, and continues seeing Jim. They begin a romantic relationship, although Jim is breaking the terms of Caroline's bail. When Michael and Geoff Butler (Ray Meagher, who is bitter at Jim for turning him in to the police over a previous incident) join forces, Butler dupes Michael – who insists that he wants no-one badly hurt – into delivering a bomb to Jim's motel room; it kills Jim's wife and children. This strains Caroline and Jim's relationship, and he blames her for the explosion. When Vivienne and Caroline go to trial and are released on good-behaviour bonds, Caroline visits him one last time and they part on good terms.
Episodes 89–114	Vivienne Anne Williams	Bernadette Gibson	Caroline Simpson's mother, who is suffering at the hands of her abusive husband. After Caroline kills him in self-defence they arrive at Wentworth, where Vivienne's fragile health worsens. Lizzie (on release and visiting Bea) recognises Vivienne and Caroline from seeking shelter at the halfway house, supporting their claims of abuse, and Vivienne is released before trial. Vivienne attempts suicide, and is placed in a care home. Vivienne and Caroline come up for trial and their charges are reduced to manslaughter, allowing them to be freed on good-behaviour bonds.
Episodes 90–116	Sharon Gilmour	Margot Knight	A scheming, spoiled young woman who is imprisoned for drug dealing after a police raid where she was selling dope to a group of youths, including social worker Paul Reid's son, Tony (John Higginson)). As a drug dealer and a vindictive troublemaker, Sharon immediately becomes an enemy of Bea. Despite having a lover (Judy Bryant) on the outside, Sharon becomes involved in a romantic relationship with Chrissie Latham and they work together to become top dog(s) while Bea is in isolation. Jealous of the relationship, Judy gets herself arrested so she can be inside with Sharon; Sharon manipulates Judy, as she does everyone else. With Chrissie moved to maternity to be with her baby, Sharon starts a rumour that Kerry Vincent is a "lagger" (informant) when Kerry turns down her romantic advances. Judy finally becomes tired of Sharon's manipulative ways, and ends their relationship. When Sharon sees corrupt officer Jock Stewart (Tommy Dysart) blackmailing and physically attacking Doreen, she tries to strike a deal with him for protection in return for her silence. Soon afterwards, she is found at the bottom of a flight of stairs with her neck broken. Judy, Bea and Kerry are all suspects, but Jock murdered her.
Episodes 91–534	Judith Frances "Judy" Bryant	Betty Bobbitt	An American ex-pat lesbian who deliberately commits a crime to join her lover, Sharon Gilmour, in prison. Initially an agitator, Judy becomes one of Bea's allies. She runs Driscoll House, a halfway house for ex-criminals. Judy is sent back to Wentworth after helping a friend, Hazel Kent (who has a terminal brain tumour), kill herself. A "deputy top dog" to Bea and Myra, she is later released and becomes a successful songwriter.
Episodes 91–392	Lilian "Lil" Stokes	Judith McLorinan	The smaller of Margo Gaffney's goons, most of her appearances are non-speaking. She is first seen in episode 91 in the background with Margo's bigger goon, Bev Covelli. Lil has her first big scene when she helps Margo and Bev give Sharon a "haircut". In her last appearance, she dies in deputy governor Colleen Powell's arms when the prison is quarantined.
Episodes 92–448	Margo Jane Gaffney	Jane Clifton	One of a long line of agitators in Cell Block H who generally played rival to the reigning top dog. Margo is in charge of all gambling in Wentworth and is usually accompanied by her stooges, Lil and Bev. She goes back and forth during the series from a good to bad guy, usually leaning toward the bad side. One of Margo's most heinous acts is the bashing of Meg Morris (temporarily imprisoned for contempt of court); this earns her the combined wrath of Bea and Chrissie, who avenge the bashing by tying Margo up and tarring and feathering her in the lavatory. She is later bashed by Bea and Chrissie when it is discovered that she set the storeroom afire with a Molotov cocktail (beginning the Great Fire) and lied about it to the cops. After Margo tries to frame Reb for attacking Myra Desmond, she is transferred to Blackmoor.
Episodes 94–95	Bernadette	Anne Phelan	A dopey background prisoner who is a mate of top dog Bea Smith.
Episodes 106–326	Heather "Mouse" Trapp	Jentah Sobott	A timid young woman in and out of Wentworth for petty crime. She escapes and goes on the run with Judy Bryant after crawling through a tunnel during a pantomime. She returns to Wentworth and is mixed up in plans for the Great Fire, where she burns to death. First credited in episode 106, Sobott was an uncredited extra since episode 67 and her character is first referred to as "Mouse" in episode 100.
Episodes 112–124	Kerry Vincent	Penny Downie	A young prisoner transferred to Wentworth to let her artistic talent flourish. Some of the women are sceptical about Kerry's special treatment, such as a double cell with room to paint. Bea dislikes her after she learns that Kerry's transfer was arranged by Ken Pearce (Tom Oliver), on whom Bea has a crush. Kerry (a former prostitute who is inside after violently attacking a client) is represented by David Austin (Rod Mullinar), a smarmy art dealer who is exploiting her prisoner status to drum up publicity and profit from her work. Kerry tries to get on with the other women, but they turn on her when Sharon Gilmour spreads a rumour that she is a "lagger" (informant) after Kerry spurns her romantic advances. Kerry gives Vera a painting that she intended to destroy; David concocts a story that Vera extorted it from Kerry. Kerry is paroled and set up in a small studio flat on the proviso that she does not see David. She continues seeing him, however, and becomes jealous of the other women he is seeing. Kerry drunkenly hits David on the head with an ashtray, and thinks she has killed him. She plans to flee, and Helen Smart's pimp sells her drugs to calm down; she takes them with alcohol, and nearly dies. When David finds her, he takes her paintings and does not call for help. Helen finds Kerry, and alerts parole officer Paul Reid. After she is out of danger, he arranges to keep her parole if she agrees to be treated in a sanatorium.
Episodes 118–441	Helen Pamela Smart	Caroline Gillmer	A likeable, amusing prostitute, frequently sent to Wentworth for soliciting, who becomes a useful outside contact for the women. Good friends with Judy Bryant, Helen is known to the prison as "the tart with a heart". Almost a victim of the leather-gloved killer, she helps Judy with Driscoll House. Her younger sister Sharon becomes involved with a cult, and Helen kidnaps her and tries to de-program her. Sharon stabs a man helping to death, causing Helen to be admitted to Wentworth for kidnapping (her first non-prostitution offence). She develops a tropical disease brought in by Glynis Ladd whilst Wentworth is under quarantine, and is sent to Barnhurst after her trial. Helen is transferred to B Block after being part of a practical joke on Joan Ferguson.
Episodes 124–133	Gail Audry Summers	Susanne Haworth	A downtrodden housewife who is Meg's neighbour when Meg moves to a new apartment. Meg becomes concerned when she hears Gail's young children crying and ferocious arguments between Gail and her short-tempered husband, Tim (Jeremy Higgins). When Meg sees bruises on the children she thinks that Tim is abusing them, but when she goes with Paul Reid and the police to intervene Gail admits that she was driven to abuse the children because she cannot cope with them all day with no help from Tim. She is sent to Wentworth on remand, and faces the anger of the other women with a "baby basher". Captain Barton (standing in for the departed Paul Reid) convinces her to stand up for herself; she tells the other women that she could not cope but loves her children, and they ease up on her. Gail receives a suspended sentence, on the condition that she seek help, and she moves away to join a support group.
Episodes 127–145	Kay Frances White	Sandy Gore	The sly administrator of Andrew Reynolds's clothing factory, where a work scheme for some of the prisoners has been arranged with Wentworth. Kay places large bets with bookie Margo (holding out on paying what she owes), and agrees to help Judy make a dress for an escape attempt. Suspected of thefts from the factory, she sets up Noeline to take the blame to get Andrew off her back. Her embezzlement of company funds to fund her gambling habit is uncovered when she "borrows" payroll money to place a large bet, but she is caught and sent to Wentworth to await trial. Kay tries to use her gambling addiction as a claim that she needs psychiatric help to escape the charge, but Bea orchestrates a scheme to reveal that Kay is still willingly gambling. The plot is successful, and Kay returns to Wentworth on a five-year sentence. She opens a book to overtake Margo's, and uses heavy-handed methods to obtain bets. Bea is sent to solitary after bashing Kay, and Kay makes a move to become top dog. Judy, with help from Lizzie and others, plans to put Kay's racket out of business by placing large bets that she cannot cover. After this backfires, they record a dog race from the radio on Tracey Morris's tape recorder, place a huge bet with Kay (knowing the outcome), doctor the newspaper's racing page, and play the tape the next day as if it were live. When Kay "borrows" Tracey's tape recorder and realises she has been set up, she strangles Lizzie until Linda Jones smashes Kay on the head with a kettle jug. Kay, unconscious and covered in blood, later dies from a blood clot on the brain.
Episodes 140–150	Linda Mary Jones	Elaine Cusick	A runner for Margo's betting racket, Linda's son Danny (Darren Sole) is unhappy living with her overbearing sister and runs away. Jim Fletcher tracks Danny down and offers to take him in until Linda is paroled; Danny's behaviour causes trouble at first, but he and Jim become close. Kay White forces Linda to become a runner for her, and tries to strangle lizzie. Linda hits Kay on the head with a kettle jug, leaving her unconscious. Lizzie takes the rap for the attack in return for Linda saving her life and out of concern about Linda being reunited with Danny. Kay dies; Linda is paroled, and Lizzie (expecting an 18-month extension to her sentence for manslaughter) receives a heavy sentence.
Episodes 141–198, episodes 463–464	Tracey Morris	Sue Devine; Michelle Thomas	A young woman on remand, accused of smuggling heroin into Australia but claiming that she was set up by her gangster boyfriend. Tracey's father, Bob, becomes romantically involved with (and marries) Meg Jackson. Tracey return in episode 463, taking her ex-stepmother Meg hostage with her boyfriend.
Episodes 142–399	Hazel Jean Kent	Belinda Davey	A generally-decent background prisoner at first. Hazel becomes a depressed alcoholic after her partner leaves her for another woman and takes their children with him. She develops a brain tumour and asks Judy Bryant to give her an overdose, leading to Judy's return to Wentworth for her final stint.
Episodes 149–159	Sarah Forrest / Jacki Nolan	Diane Craig	A classy, sophisticated, well-spoken woman whom Jim meets at a party. Trying not to put her off about his job, Jim tells her that he is a building contractor. Sarah, part owner of an interior-design business, offers Jim a business deal to the chagrin of her haughty partner Julian (Peter Stratford). After Sarah and Jim spend the night together, she finds his prison-officer jacket and flees; when he visits her at her business, she tells him their relationship is over. Erica is considering some home-decorating, and Meg says she heard that Jim has an interior-design friend. Erica visits Sarah's business and seems to recognise her, later realising that she is Jacki Nolan (who had escaped from Barnhurst a few years earlier and is using "Sarah Forrest" as an alias). She convinces Jim to try to persuade Jacki to turn herself in; Jim is unsure what to do, but Jacki surrenders. Sent to Wentworth, Sarah and Jim try to play down their relationship for Erica and the other inmates. Jim joins Erica at a Prison Reform Group meeting, and the group comes up with a publicity campaign to get Jacki pardoned – insisting that her successful business indicates her rehabilitation. Julian has his own campaign to get Jacki pardoned, and warns Jim not to ruin it. Jacki is loath to return to Barnhurst, since she was molested there by a bullying lesbian officer (the reason she escaped). With increasing media attention on her case, Jacki is pardoned and never sees Jim again.
Episodes 154–552	Myra June Desmond	Anne Phelan	A former prisoner who worked with the Prison Reform Group before returning to Wentworth after killing her husband, Myra replaces Bea Smith as the series' second-longest-running top dog. She is a thoughtful, strong woman who sacrifices her life for the safety of the other hostages during the Ballinger siege. Before the siege, Myra organises a scheme to set up Joan Ferguson by bashing Lou Kelly and framing Joan for the assault; inmate Anita Selby reveals the truth to Governor Ann Reynolds, who reinstates Ferguson and introduces stricter security at the prison. Ann tells Myra that she will no longer recognise her as top dog, and threatens her with a transfer to Blackmoor if she causes any more trouble.
Episodes 160–167	Anne Griffin	Rowena Wallace	A seemingly-timid young woman, sent to Wentworth for robbing a shopkeeper at knife-point. She insists that she is innocent; the money found on her when she was arrested was loaned to her by her friend, Megan. No trace (or proof of existence) can be found of Megan and, with no alibi, Anne awaits trial. Bea is attacked from behind in the corridor, and it emerges that Anne was responsible; Bea plans revenge but Judy persuades her to hold off, convincing her that Anne is mentally ill. Anne tries to convince the authorities that Megan has written to her (the alibi she needs), but Anne wrote the letter herself. As Erica realises that Anne needs psychiatric help, details come to light about Anne's abusive upbringing, her imaginary friend Megan, and the baby she had that died (also called Megan). Anne is inside during the tunnel-escape plan of the end of the 1980 season; after the other women realise she is unreliable, they try to conceal all evidence of the escape plans for fear that she might inform the officers. During the escape attempt (episode 165), Judy, Mouse, Doreen and Irene Nagel escape; Lizzie decides at the last minute to join Doreen, leading them down into the tunnel with Bea trying to call her back. As the tunnel collapses (trapping Bea, Lizzie and the injured Doreen), Anne replaces its cover to stop them from getting out and they are trapped in the collapsed tunnel. Mouse is recaptured and raises the alarm, leading the officers to rescue Bea and the others. Bea plans to kill Anne for what she did, but Dr. Weisman certifies her as mentally unbalanced and she is sent to a psychiatric hospital.
Episode 165	Irene Nagel	Heather Howard	An inmate who joins the escape from Wentworth at the last minute. Irene is mentioned by Judy as being in on the escape in episode 163, and she is mentioned in episode 126 as one of the first of the women on the Reynolds clothing-factory job. Following instructions with the other escapees, she inadvertently makes the tunnel collapse by slipping and grabbing a rickety support beam that could not support her weight and is killed.
Episodes 173–180	Sandra "Sandy" Hamilton	Candy Raymond	A new prisoner who claims to be a first-timer after being caught driving with expired tags. Bea and others soon become suspicious; for a supposed first-timer, Sandy seems very familiar with prisoner etiquette and asks a lot of questions (particularly around, and concerning, Judy). They suspect her to be an undercover police officer after information about Judy's recent escape and recapture. Suspicions heighten when she convinces the governor to move her into Judy's cell, and she tries making seductive advances towards Judy; after Bea and Judy heavy her, she admits that she is a newspaper journalist who got herself put inside to try to get a scoop on Judy's escape. When Evelyn Randall arrives, Sandy offers to write an article about how Evelyn was unjustly imprisoned in return for Evelyn getting information with her; Bea and the women plant Evelyn's stolen file in Sandy's cell, and Sandy is sent to isolation. When the prison is infected by an unidentified disease and the isolation cells are needed for quarantined officers, she is returned to the women. Afraid of becoming infected after seeing her mother waste away years before, Sandy tries to escape during a food pick-up; Jim Fletcher threatens to shoot her to keep her from infecting people outside the prison. With the mysterious disease cured in episode 179, Sandy is framed for scarring Evelyn in a fire booby trap under Evelyn's bed; this eliminates any chance of her imminent release. She makes a deal with Bea to prove her innocence in return for Sandy writing an exposé of poor prison conditions when she is released. After she is released, she writes a story about her time inside and neglects to mention the conditions she promised to expose.
Episodes 175–179	Evelyn Randall	Julia Blake	Called "Evie" only by Lizzie, she is an eccentric, middle-aged herbalist who arrives with fellow new prisoners Jennie Armstrong and Georgie Baxter. Evelyn has been accused of manslaughter after poisoning one of her patients, but insists that she is innocent; she has a grudge against conventional medicine, insisting that herbal remedies are the true cure. Her haughty attitude annoys Bea, but most of the other prisoners like her. When Doreen asks Evelyn for a remedy she gets sicker, leading Bea to believe that Evelyn poisoned her; Evelyn finds that Doreen mistakenly heated the remedy, making her sicker. A mysterious illness breaks out in the prison, assumed to be a tropical disease brought in by Jenny Armstrong (who had just returned from overseas). As prisoners and officers become dangerously ill and Wentworth is quarantined, Evelyn insists that her herbal remedies can cure them while conventional doctors struggle to find the cause. The other prisoners start to believe her when one of her secret remedies begins to heal the very-ill Meg; it emerges that Evelyn was behind the "disease", lacing people's food with ingredients to sicken them and giving her the opportunity to "heal" them. When the other women find out, Bea insists that they bide their time to make Evelyn nervous. A booby-trap fire with turpentine placed under Evelyn's bed badly burns her, and she is hospitalised.
Episode 175	Jennie Armstrong	Sally Cooper	A young, naïve prisoner brought to Wentworth at the same time as Georgie Baxter and Evie Randall, she emerges from the prison truck covered in blood and terrified after being attacked by Georgie. In the prison hospital, she tells Lizzie she is only in prison for not paying a minor traffic fine and thought that prison sounded fun. Lizzie enlightens her about prison life, leading Jennie to quickly decide to pay the fine and get out. Soon afterwards, prisoners and staff become dangerously ill; it is suspected that Jennie might be the cause, since she recently returned from Africa and might have brought a rare disease back with her. After her release, police try to find her to trace the disease until it is discovered that Evelyn Randall is lacing people's food with poison.
Episodes 175–186	Georgina "Georgie" Baxter	Tracy Mann	A violent, illiterate biker's moll who arrives in a prison van with Jennie Armstrong and Evelyn Randall, viciously attacking Jennie during the trip. Georgie is immediately put in solitary, and stays there after a series of outbursts; several inmates and staff compare her to Franky Doyle. Prison teacher David Andrews (Serge Lazareff) convinces Erica Davidson to let him see Georgie to try to get to the root of her behaviour; he suggests putting Georgie in with Judy (who can take care of herself), and Judy becomes Georgie's first real friend inside. During the mysterious illness that sweeps through the prison, Georgie stays at Judy's bedside and tends to her. Judy later misinterprets Georgie's caring friendship and makes a pass at her, sending Georgie into a rage and another stint in solitary. Visiting Georgie in solitary, David realises that Georgie has a severe hearing impediment which has led her to misunderstand many things and believe that people are laughing at her. Georgie has an operation, and her hearing improves remarkably. At Wentworth, David suggests putting Georgie in with Bea (and Lizzie); this angers Doreen, igniting a feud. Bea takes Georgie under her wing, clashing with Juday when Doreen is sent to solitary for a fight that Georgie started. This leads to a rift between Judy and Bea, with prisoners taking sides and Georgie (still angry at Judy's advances) stirring the pot. Georgie's mother Jeannie arrives at the prison for running a brothel, but Georgie wants nothing to do with her; David begins teaching Georgie how to read. Her parole hearing is coming up, but David recommends that she not yet be paroled so he can ensure that she continues her education. When the women hear this from Vera they boycott David's classes, but a positive word to the V.J. from Meg (who has found Georgie a job) and David withdrawing his recommendation gets Georgie her parole. Georgie leaves to live with "Mike the Bike" (Jon Geros), who had visited her inside several times, but storms out after seeing his messy flat and realising that he only wants her for sex. Meg cannot find her to bring to her first day working in a supermarket, and goes to apologise to the manager; she finds that Georgie has turned up on her own accord, and is happily hard at work.
Episodes 180–183	Jean Nancy "Jeannie" Baxter	Leila Hayes	Georgie Baxter's mother, who had neglected and belittled her. She visits Georgie after her operation, which results in an argument. Jeannie is then admitted to Wentworth for "living off immoral earnings" as a brothel madam. She gets on the wrong side of Bea, who is determined to see that Georgie gets an education and goes straight, and Georgie wants nothing to do with her. Before Jeannie is released, she unsuccessfully tries to apologise to Georgie for her treatment. Georgie then convinces David Andrews to let her see Jeannie and they part on amicable terms, with Georgie calling her "Mum" for the first time.
Episodes 197–471	Marie Winter	Maggie Millar	A tough long-term prisoner who was top dog of country prison Barnhurst, specialising in drug-dealing. She escapes with help from Lou Kelly and Joan Ferguson by climbing over the fence during afternoon exercise, clinging to a helicopter and flying away. A few days later, she is captured and sent to Blackmoor.
Episodes 209–213	Michelle Parks	Nina Landis	An attractive young athlete with Olympic potential, Michelle is remanded to Wentworth for stealing from the office where she worked. Once inside, she (literally) runs rings around deputy governor Jim Fletcher.
Episodes 209–347	Lori Young	Susannah Fowle	A young girl who visits Wentworth searching for her biological mother, who had given her up for adoption: Judy Bryant. Lori deliberately gets imprisoned to spend more time getting to know her mother.
Episodes 213–223	Dinah Walford	Trudy Simms	A middle-aged woman who arrives with Kathy Hall, charged with soliciting and sentenced to two weeks. Sent to D Block, on cleaning duty she pulls an alarm to create a diversion while Kathy is attacked. Bea and Judy suspect that she was responsible for the attack, but she is released on parole. Bea tells Kathy about the possibility of Dinah being responsible for the attack and several threats. Kathy tells this to her ex-husband, Terry Harrison (who works at Wentworth), but remains in denial since she does not know Dinah. Terry confronts Dinah on the street, and she denies knowing anything about the attack. She takes him to a male friend, who threatens to beat him up. Dinah attacked Kathy to keep her quiet about illegal business in a pawn shop involving Dinah and her gangster friends. She and some friends confront Terry to help them with something. After one of them witnesses a conversation between him and Inspector Grace outside Wentworth, Terry is killed in a hit-and-run.
Episodes 213–220	Kathy Hall	Sue Jones	Imprisoned for theft, Kathy is heavily involved with the local underworld. She is the ex-wife of prison officer Terry Harrison (Brian Hannan), and victim of attempts by Dinah Walford to silence her about illegal business the pawn shop Dinah and her friends hang out at. After Dinah is paroled the harmful attempts stop, but Kathy remains in denial until Terry confronts her after a beating by Dinah's friends. Kathy admits being in the pawn shop, where she met a man named John who conducted secretive business with them. Terry decides to have her killed as revenge for ending their relationship and losing his unborn child while Kathy had a relationship with another man. Terry tells the pawn-shop manager by phone (not knowing it is John) the date of Kathy's release. When she is released, she is killed by a hit-and-run driver.
Episodes 215–227	Alison Page	Fay Kelton	A troubled suburban prisoner, inside for shoplifting and unhappy at being locked up with common criminals. She strikes out at some of the other women, particularly Doreen. Alison tries to commit suicide by electrocution, but is found by Bea and taken to the prison hospital. She then shares a cell with Judy Bryant, who is not pleased. Alison is allowed to work in the reception area, and the other women feel that she is receiving special treatment; Bea uses this to get information in exchange for her protection. Alison's 15-year-old son Chris, unable to cope with her imprisonment, acts out at school and runs away from home. When her husband, Don, is in an accident at work, Chris and his 10-year-old sister Susan are fostered by ex-prisoner Myra Desmond. When Don is released from hospital, Myra advises Alison about how to cope with the other women. Alison is transferred back to H Block, and reconciles with the other women. She clashes with prison officer Colleen Powell; Colleen assaults her, and she fights back. She presses assault charges, drops them, and Alison is released.
Episodes 228–236	Andrea Hennessy	Bethany Lee	A student and political activist who is admitted to Wentworth after assaulting Colleen Powell during a demonstration outside the prison. She tries to fight for freedom on the inside, leaving messages all over her cell and the rec room and annoying the other women. To secure her release, two of her followers kidnap Erica Davidson and keep her tied up at their hideout. It is discovered by the police, who kill one of the women. The other, Linda Golman, is taken to Wentworth. After Linda dies by suicide, Andrea fights with incoming prisoner Sandy Edwards and is transferred to E Block for her protection.
Episodes 230–236	Linda Golman	Mary Charleston	An associate of Andrea Hennessy, who is remanded to Wentworth for her part in the kidnapping of governor Erica Davidson and becomes extremely depressed after being placed in solitary. Linda is found hanging in Andrea's cell; her death is considered a suicide, but it is wondered if Andrea hanged her (which she denies).
Episodes 235–264	Sandy Edwards	Louise Le Nay	A cocky gangster's moll, inside for murder. She briefly takes over as top dog whilst Bea Smith is in hospital, and incites a riot with the help of Kate Peterson. During the riot she makes advances to officer Steve Faulkner (who is held hostage), and they later have an affair. Sandy disappears after a fixed "meeting" with Kate Peterson at the rubbish bins; when the women are called in, Kate returns instead of Sandy.
Episodes 235–273	Kathryn Elaine "Kate" Peterson ("Doc")	Olivia Hamnett	A former general physician who had poisoned her lover. A refined, intelligent and coolly self-reliant inmate, Kate is one of the series' few characters who is a "good guy" who later turns bad. She gently sits on the fence whilst being involved with lagging to screws, lagging to cops, murder, trafficking drugs, fraud and bribery, acting untouchable. Kate leaves Wentworth for a mental institution for the criminally insane after receiving a death sentence from her fellow inmates, realising that she had burned all her bridges and becoming mentally ill (which many of the women had predicted).
Episodes 260–302	Susan Elaine "Susie" Driscoll	Jacqui Gordon	A young girl who is admitted to Wentworth after escaping from every juvenile institution in which she has been placed. She spends most of her time in Wentworth trying to escape. Due to her youth and innocence, Susie is taken under the collective maternal wing of most of the women (including Colleen Powell). Released on her 17th birthday, she is led by Donna Mason into prostitution. Susie is the first resident of the halfway house run by Judy Bryant (later named Driscoll House), and eventually moves to the country to live with Joanne Slater.
Episodes 261–290	Jackie Louise Donahue	Catherine Lynch	A young prostitute who is picked up by middle-aged Ron Crosby and goes back with him to his motel in a taxi driven by the paroled Judy Bryant. Judy witnesses Crosby treating Jackie harshly during the ride. When they get to the motel, Jackie changes her mind; Judy fights off Crosby, who tries to take Jackie with him. Jackie robs him, taking his money and leaving his empty wallet in Judy's taxi. When Crosby goes to the police and presses charges against Judy and Jackie for assault and robbery, the police search Judy's place and find the wallet. Judy is sent back to Wentworth for assault and robbery, and Jackie later turns up in Wentworth for a two-week stay on remand for soliciting. Judy is angry with her, and Bea Smith convinces her to tell the governor the truth about the incident. When Jackie decides to write a written confession, Judy is released. After Jackie is released, Susie Driscoll meets her on the street. Jackie takes her to dinner and introduces her to another prostitute, Donna Mason.
Episodes 273–302	Joanne Slater	Carole Yelland	Imprisoned for parking violations, Susie Driscoll believes her to be her birth mother; to keep Susie from escaping, the women let Susie believe it. Joanne invites Susie to stay with her and her family on their farm.
Episodes 276–284	Carol Francis Lewis	Elizabeth Crosby	A young woman imprisoned for shooting her husband Doug, who (with his friend, Mel) kidnaps Colleen Powell's daughter Jenny. While Jenny is held captive, Carol makes sure she is well-protected. While trying to contact her parents to let them know she is alright, Doug catches her and beats her senseless. After he rapes Jenny, Carol awakens and scratches him. Doug, Mel, and Carol flee the hideout to a hotel when the police learn about the kidnapping. Carol kills Doug, telling Mel to dump Jenny in the middle of nowhere. Jenny finds a police station and is reunited with her parents, and Carol is sent to Wentworth for killing her husband. Colleen mistreats Carol, considering her as guilty as Doug for not acting against him sooner. Margo Gaffney defends Carol, whol convinces the other women about Colleen's behavior. Bea confronts Colleen, who denies everything and threatens her. Carol receives a letter from Jenny thanking her for her help; Colleen burns it to keep her from using at her upcoming trial. At the trial, Carol pleads guilty; Jenny testifies about her help and Doug's abuse of her. Carol is sentenced to three years, and is transferred to Barnhurst with Margo.
Episodes 285–352	Faye Quinn	Anne Lucas	A petty-criminal inmate who tries to take charge of gambling at Wentworth, and the first inmate to collude with corrupt officer Joan "The Freak" Ferguson. She becomes the prison bookie, replacing Margo. Faye is pressured by Nola McKenzie to front her insurance racket and provide cash for Nola's deals. She is released after Joan forced her to lag on Nola's dealing and goes to live with her mother, but cannot stay away from her old racing friends. Her sister Glynis (Kirsty Child) forbids her to see her nephew, Billy (who turns out to be her own son). After becoming involved with stealing VCRs from her job, she is returned to Wentworth and is transferred to C Block.
Episodes 288–303	Hannah Simpson	Julieanne Newbould	A young woman on remand for armed robbery, and the first unwilling object of Joan Ferguson's lust. Joan repeatedly has her put in solitary to pressure her (preventing her from taking part in an escape planned by Duncan Campbell), and is transferred to Barnhurst after her court hearing.
Episodes 290–303	Donna Mason	Arkie Whiteley	A heroin addict and prostitute who leads Susie Driscoll astray and manipulates her into prostitution. Bea Smith tries to help her get clean cold-turkey, since she reminds Bea of her late daughter Debbie. She dies in Bea's arms after injecting herself with spiked drugs.
Episodes 297–391	Maxine Daniels	Lisa Crittenden	A young biker, frequently inside for petty theft. She escapes with Lucy Ferguson, but is shot dead by a security guard whilst trying to escape the scene of a robbery.
Episodes 300–326	Barbara Fields	Susan Guerin	A devious middle-class woman, imprisoned after being caught with embezzled funds from the shoe factory where she worked. Barbara is the first inmate to pose a threat to Joan Ferguson after she acquires her incriminating diaries. During the Great Fire, she tries to recover them from Erica's office but collapses and dies.
Episodes 304–339	Paddy Lawson	Anna Hruby	An aggressive young woman, imprisoned for assaulting a colleague after they were locked in a storage room during an office party. It is learned that Paddy's violent behaviour is a result of claustrophobia; she settles down, and becomes a good friend of Bea Smith. After Paddy exposes escaped murderer Nola McKenzie's involvement in a bank robbery, Nola drowns her in a washroom sink.
Episodes 307–309	Penny Seymour	Joy Dunstan	Inside for prostitution, the Black Gloved Killer breaks her neck and leaves her dead in an alley after she is released.
Episodes 310–311	Tina Lee Gibson	Debbie Cumming	Sentenced to seven days in Wentworth for prostitution and arriving with returning prisoner Helen Smart, she butts heads with Joan Ferguson (who dislikes prostitutes). Tina and Helen are released together; Tina goes back to the streets, and becomes the second victim of the Black Gloved Killer.
Episodes 313–320	Sally Dempster	Liz Harris	A neurotic, alcoholic middle-class housewife, imprisoned for trying to run down her neglectful husband after an argument. Sally receives rough treatment from the other women after admitting that she abused her daughter, Michelle. She attempts suicide in her cell and is saved by Colleen Powell, who makes Sally's husband realise that his selfish behaviour provoked her actions; he gets Sally released, and they reconcile with Michelle.
Episodes 325–329	Jeannie Stanton	Rona McLeod	A pregnant prisoner whose baby is delivered by Bea Smith and Chrissie Latham in a men's prison while the men rioted.
Episodes 330–332	Valerie Jacobs	Barbara Angell	An old friend of Colleen Powell who gave stolen goods to her boyfriend to sell in his shop.
Episodes 331–369	Jean Carter/Nola McKenzie	Carole Skinner	A double murderer who escaped from death row in Western Australia, and arguably Bea Smith's deadliest rival. She is introduced as Jean Carter, who takes refuge at Judy's halfway house. She is arrested for knocking a cop unconscious at the house who was catching onto her true identity. It is learned that she faced a death penalty in Western Australia for killing a cop. Nola angers Bea by murdering Paddy Lawson, and Bea brands her with a soldering iron. She tries to drive Bea insane with the aid of Joan Ferguson and Zara Moonbeam, and Bea shoots her with a zip gun.
Episodes 311–340	Trixie Mann	Anna Mizza	A young woman, imprisoned for prostitution, who becomes a brief ally of Nola McKenzie and is released.
Episodes 343–537	Ruth Shaw	Mary Murphy	A prisoner first seen expressing hatred of Nola McKenzie after Bea tells the prisoners that she branded her in revenge for killing Paddy. Ruth is caught with some of Nola's cigarettes, stolen from the storage room by Faye Quinn for an insurance scheme. After her appearances in the Nola McKenzie storyline, Ruth makes more frequent minor appearances.
Episodes 344–352	Janice Young	Catherine Wilkin	A proud suburban wife and mother, imprisoned for refusing to pay a court fine. Her husband, Chris (Roger Oakley), becomes involved with Colleen Powell while Janice is inside.
Episodes 345–381	Roxanne Bradshaw	Peppie D'Or	A friend of Maxine Daniels who is the courier when Maxine, Nola and Joan Ferguson smuggle goods into the prison. She is later admitted to Wentworth for receiving stolen goods, and is pregnant after agreeing to a surrogacy arrangement with a middle-class couple. After she gives birth, Roxanne is transferred to Barnhurst.
Episodes 348–353	Jill Clark	Katy Brinson	A departmental employee posing as an inmate to conduct a covert investigation of Wentworth.
Episodes 354–366	Lainie Dobson	Marina Finlay	A tattoo-covered shoplifter who turns to drugs inside. She is admitted with Ellen Farmer, with whom she is thought to be having a homosexual relationship; it is discovered that Ellen is really Allan. Lainie tries to remove her tattoos by dipping her cut arms into caustic soda, and is released.
Episodes 354–360	Allan "Ellen" Farmer	Michael Cormick	A shy woman who is brought to Wentworth with Lainie Dobson. Joan finds Ellen and Lainie in bed together, and assumes that their relationship is homosexual. In the shower block, Helen Smart discovers that Ellen is a man; he claims that the police made a mistake. Meg learns that Ellen is Allan after Maxine tries to seduce him. He is released, and Judy later visits him.
Episodes 355–361	Diane Henley	Rhonda Cressey	An illiterate prisoner whose plight highlights the lack of educational facilities at Wentworth. She is taught to read by the prison's new teacher, John Maxwell.
Episodes 361–367	Denise Tyler	Geraldene Morrow	A working-class single mother on remand for apparently killing one of her sons. It is later revealed by Judy that she was covering for her other eight-year-old son, and she is released.
Episodes 362–370	Zara Moonbeam	Ilona Rodgers	On remand for fraud, Zara claims to be a medium with "second sight" and becomes embroiled in a scheme by Joan Ferguson and Nola McKenzie to drive Bea Smith insane. She is released.
Episodes 368–372	Tracey Belman	Alyson Best	A paraplegic prisoner who poisoned her husband after a car crash which left her in a wheelchair. Joan is assigned to care for Tracey, but after learning that Joan is a lesbian she accuses her of trying to kiss her when she is awakened from a nightmare. Joan caused Tracy to reveal that she actually could walk. Sentenced to three years, she is transferred to Barnhurst.
Episodes 371–376	Maggie May Kennedy	Davina Whitehouse	A geriatric drug mule, convicted of smuggling heroin, who is an old friend of Lizzie Birdsworth. At first convincing the women that she was carrying diamonds, she and Bea smuggle out a letter to the newspaper about the imprisonment of older people. Maggie applies for extradition to the US, where she believes that her press friends will get her released. When she receives the extradition order, Ted Douglas tells her that it is on the condition that she serve her full twenty-year sentence.
Episodes 373–377	Carol Colsen	Merrin Canning	The next-door neighbour of Joan Ferguson, an abused housewife who snaps and kills her husband as Joan enters the house. She holds her daughter, Jill, and Joan hostage. In Wentworth, the women resent her for threatening her daughter. Joan takes Jill under her wing, and brings her to see her mother. When Jill rejects her, Carol hangs herself in her cell with her stockings.
Episodes 373–382	Laura Gardiner/Brandy Carter	Roslyn Gentle	Admitted to Wentworth as a surly, antagonistic prostitute named Brandy, Meg Morris recognises her as a meek librarian named Laura. After Laura tries to kill herself in an attempt to get rid of Brandy, a third personality emerges who calls herself Susan. It becomes apparent that Laura/Brandy is schizophrenic. During a psychiatric examination, Laura gets rid of Brandy (the fate of Susan is never explained) and is sent to a mental hospital.
Episodes 373–525	Frances Harvey	Wanda Davidson	A tough heavy who is introduced as a halfway house resident but ends up in Wentworth without an explanation. She and Alice Jenkins bash Hannah Geldschmidt, and she kills Sarah Higgins but is never charged with the murder.
Episodes 377–510	Sandra Louise "Pixie" Mason	Judy McBurney	A flighty, romantic inmate admitted for bigamy charges. She applies for a job on the outside, and keeps it after the owners learn that she was a prisoner. Pixie was raped by Frank Burke, but her friends and Joan Ferguson helped set up evil screw Len Murphy, for the rape. She never recovers, and is transferred to Ingleside.
Episodes 381–382	Gerri Doogan	Deborah Kennedy	Brought to Wentworth for soliciting, she is a plant who is trying to recover a photo of Lionel Fellowes paying a bribe. Bea tricks her into exposing her hand too soon by pretending to have hidden the photo in a lump of modelling clay.
Episodes 383–407	Petra Roberts	Penny Maegraith	A former teacher remanded to Wentworth for murdering her father (who raped her and her younger sister), and was engaged to prison doctor Scott Collins. When her sister is found dead, Petra says that she was not the murderer, but covered for her sister. She is released.
Episodes 383–388	Sharon Smart	Liddy Clark	Helen Smart's younger sister, who becomes involved with a crooked religious cult. When Helen, Judy, a former cult member and a deprogrammer lock her in the Driscoll House attic to help de-program her, she stabs the deprogrammer to dath. Convicted of murder, she is sentenced to probation because she was held against her will.
Episodes 385–389	Lucy Ferguson	Yoni Prior	Joan Ferguson's niece, who arrives at Wentworth on drug charges. She breaks into Joan's house, persuading her to let her stay while she looks for a job and to lend her money to buy interview clothes. Lucy buys drugs, which she and her boyfriend hide in Joan's house until they can sell them. Lucy is arrested for possession, but is admitted with the surname "Walker" to hide her relationship with Joan and blackmails her for favours. She escapes from Wentworth, with Joan's help, in a laundry truck with Maxine Daniels.
Episodes 389–391	Glynis Ladd	Debbie Cumming	A junkie dealer who admits that she had been in Barnhurst. She develops lassa fever (causing Wentworth to be quarantined), and dies.
Episodes 391–402	Rosemary Kaye	Jodie Yemm	A naïve country girl who comes to Melbourne looking for work and has her money stolen. Wally sends her to a boarding house, where she is sexually harassed by supermarket manager Rod Miller. She hits him with an ashtray, he presses charges, and she is sent to Wentworth on remand. After Wally convinces Rod to drop the charges, Rosemary is released and returns to the country to get married.
Episodes 394–447	Sonia Elizabeth Stevens	Tina Bursill	A cool vice queen who had operated a protection racket fleecing prostitutes whilst maintaining cover as a policeman's wife. Imprisoned for heroin trafficking, she takes over as top dog before Bea is sent to Barnhurst. Her position is taken by Minnie Donovan while Judy and Helen ensure that Sonia does not return to being top dog. She escapes, and is presumed killed.
Episodes 394–414	Randi Goodlove	Zoe Bertram	A mercenary, classy prostitute who crosses swords with Meg Morris when she tries to manipulate Meg's son Marty (Andrew McKaige) into marriage as a cover for her prostitution. She is killed by officer David Bridges, and her body is hidden in the boiler room.
Episodes 401–460	Cass Parker	Babs McMillan	A mercurial farmer's daughter, imprisoned for manslaughter. She is transferred from Barnhurst (where she was initially incarcerated) after killing an officer there. Cass' docile demeanour hides a violent temper and a tendency to lose control; she decapitates murderous officer David Bridges with a garden spade when he tries to kill her, but becomes friends with Minnie Donovan and Bobbie Mitchell. She is transferred to a mental hospital after attempting to strangle officer Dennis Cruikshank when he causes Bobbie to miscarry her baby.
Episodes 404–616	Louise "Lou" Kelly	Louise Siversen	A vicious prison thug, and arguably the most violent agitator in H Block during the series' later years. She starts as a background prisoner before causing a riot by faking a murder attempt by Rita Connors, cutting herself with a knife. During the riot she kills Eve Wilder, and escapes afterwards. On the run, Lou is raped by Alice Jenkins's brother and kills him and his mother. She is beaten to death with a glass bottle by Janet "Maggot" Williams while in solitary.
Episodes 405–437	Minerva "Minnie" Donovan	Wendy Playfair	An elderly woman who had been a foster carer and organised her charges into a team of shoplifters. The series' most unorthodox top dog, she is transferred to B Block after spending an escape day with Bobbie Mitchell in a country town after the glee-club competition.
Episodes 405–533	Roberta "Bobbie" Mitchell	Maxine Klibingaitis	A streetwise, rebellious punk imprisoned for shoplifting and assault. Accused of pushing Reb over the catwalk but cleared of the charge, Bobbie is released and returns for Marlene's wedding.
Episodes 408–416	Brenda Hewitt	Carmen Warrington	A talented forger, working for the local underworld, who is involved in a brief business partnership with Sonia Stevens while inside.
Episodes 414–428	Belinda Margaret Johns	Jane Turner	An embittered woman who is imprisoned to take revenge on Sonia Stevens, whose protection-racket partner blinded her in a bashing. She is transferred to another cell block, away from Sonia, after an attempted bashing with a wrench.
Episodes 416–499	Sarah Higgins ("Hangin' Higgins")	Nell Johnson	A visiting justice notorious for her tough attitude and harsh sentences, Sarah gets a taste of life on the other side of the bars when she is remanded for corruption. Tried by the inmates and shunned, she is found with her throat slit by Frances Harvey.
Episodes 419–692	Alice "Lurch" Jenkins	Lois Collinder	One of the prisoners who graduated from a small, non-speaking part into a more fleshed-out role. Alice, initially a thug, mellows and becomes an ally of Rita Connors after the riot when she realises that Lou is no good for her. Her brother rapes Lou, who kills him and Alice's mother.
Episodes 419–534	Marge Briggs	Christine Best	Transferred from D Block by Joan as muscle for Sonia, she goads Cass into a fight and is later paroled.
Episodes 422–589	Rebecca Anne "Reb" Kean	Janet Andrewartha	A tough rival of top dog Myra Desmond, she rebelled against her wealthy family. Reb pushes Joan Ferguson off the catwalk in self-defence, and is pushed off the catwalk by Marie Winter. She is transferred to Blackmoor after attacking Myra and assaulting Joan, swearing that she would be back. Reb returns to Wentworth a changed character after shock therapy and a bashing by officer Cynthia Leech, and is released after being cleared of the attack on Joyce Barry.
Episodes 428–432	Mo Maguire	Bronwyn Gibbs	An antagonistic remand prisoner protesting her innocence of a burglary charge, and released with Camilla Wells.
Episodes 429–432	Camilla Wells	Annette Andre	A radio-show host and journalist who arrives at Wentworth as a celebrity inmate for not paying a parking fine and is released.
Episodes 429–432	Meryl King	Marilyn Maguire	A prostitute imprisoned for drug possession, with links to the local underworld, is released and shot dead.
Episodes 430–445	Gloria Payne	Tottie Goldsmith	A trouble-making inmate and early antagonist of top dog Myra Desmond (her husband's mistress on the outside), last seen in hospital after having boiling water spilled on her by Phyllis in an attempt to frame Myra.
Episodes 433–441	Sarah Webster	Fiona Paul	A young, single mother who is remanded to Wentworth after sheltering old friend Reb Kean while Reb is on the run. She is released after being cleared of a murder charge.
Episode 445	Diana Hardy	Julia Gardner	A remand prisoner put into uniform by Meg due to her pill-induced amnesia, she is quickly transferred to another prison.
Episodes 450–472	Rachel Millsom	Kim Trengove	A young woman who works in a goods shop with her elderly father and begins a relationship with officer Rick Manning. Her father is killed by drunk driver Trevor Priest, who tries to manipulate her with money and condolences so she will not press charges. Rachel testifies against him at trial, but he is acquitted. After a final confrontation outside the court, Rachel kills him with her car. Remanded to Wentworth, she is transferred to a prison farm after her trial to continue serving her sentence.
Episodes 451–456	Hannah Geldschmidt	Agnieszka Perepeczko	An East German Jewish concentration-camp survivor and illegal immigrant who arrives at Wentworth awaiting extradition to East Germany. She is sent back to West Germany, and her relatives go through the immigration department to bring her back to Australia.
Episodes 457–470	Leigh Templar	Virginia Hey	A fashion model remanded to Wentworth after killing her manager, who was blackmailing her with porn films she made at the start of her career. After Ann Reynolds is dismissed from the prison (thanks to Joan Ferguson and Marie Winter), Leigh uses her influence to get her reinstated because Ann saved her life during the riot started by Winter. Leigh receives a two-year probation bond, and leaves the prison with Ann's gratitude.
Episodes 461–534	Marlene "Rabbit" Warren	Genevieve Lemon	A juvenile prankster, imprisoned for manslaughter after throwing stones at cars goes tragically wrong. When new officer Heather Rogers is introduced to the women, Marlene realises that they went to school together and makes her a target of her practical jokes. Another joke (intended for Marie Winter) earns her first bashing when she loosens Marie's bed so that it collapses, and finds her stash of drugs. Marie forces Marlene to give her information about Heather and her family which she uses to blackmail Heather into smuggling drugs into the prison. Marlene begins running books on whatever comes to her mind, including Pixie's knowledge of the Bible and cockroach racing. Her father's gift of the Guinness Book of World Records inspires her to start a fundraising waltz marathon to support deaf children. She marries Matt Delaney, one of the Woodridge prisoners temporarily transferred to Wentworth. After the ceremony, Marlene is released and Matt is sent to a prison farm to serve the rest of his sentence.
Episodes 462–486	Dot Farrar	Alethea McGrath	An elderly, hypochondriac prisoner who had been inside for years, generally regarded as a nuisance by the other women. After being poisoned by fellow prisoner Angela Adams, she is transferred to a prison farm.
Episodes 463–468	Edna May Pearson	Vivean Gray	A genteel woman, imprisoned for trying to poison her second husband. Most UK viewers saw Edna arrive, do very little, and disappear. Her episodes were edited to remove her scenes after a woman who had been acquitted of a similar offence threatened to sue Grundy's, claiming similarities between the character and her case. The complete storyline has been screened in subsequent international screenings. Edna gets most of the women and officers onside, convincing them that she is innocent. She tells the women that her first husband died by suicide, and she was arrested for apparently trying to poison her second husband. Edna lets something slip to Marlene which makes it clear that she poisoned her husband; she then tries to poison Marlene (who did not hear) several times, accidentally poisoning Alice and Frances by lacing drink meant for Marlene. Edna is released with no further charges, and when she is gone Marlene and the others put together the pieces and realise that she is guilty.
Episodes 464–492	Diedre Kean	Anne Charleston	Reb Kean's estranged, socialite mother, who tries to persuade Reb to see her dying father. She visits Reb when she is hospitalised after a bashing from Marie Winter to tell her that her father has left all his money to her. She helps her escape but, concerned that she might die without medical treatment, she informs the police of her whereabouts and ends up in Wentworth with Reb. Diedre is tortured by Frances, Alice and Lou, and Reb joins in. Myra persuades Reb to pay attention to her mother after she is severely beaten by some of the women. Reb and Diedre reconcile just before someone posts her bail and she is released. When Lou Kelly escapes, she seeks refuge with Diedre and holds her hostage in her house. Deidre escapes, and visits Reb to tell her what happened.
Episodes 472–477	Beverly "Bev The Beast" Baker	Maggie Dence	A serial killer, called "The Beast" by the tabloids, who terrifies staff and inmates; she hurts and kills people because it gives her a 'high'. After cutting Bobbie's hands with a razor and burning Judy Bryant with a soldering iron, she stabs new social worker Rob Summerton to death with a knitting needle. Soon afterwards, Bev dies by injecting herself with an empty hypodermic needle in front of Judy Bryant and Ann Reynolds.
Episodes 477–488	Angela "Angel" Adams	Kylie Foster	An apparently-sweet, innocent young girl imprisoned for her involvement in her boyfriend's crimes, signing fraudulent dole cheques. Actually vicious and manipulative, she takes an interest in social worker Phil Cleary who is dating Meg, and sets her up to be raped. Her grandmother reveals her true colours to Ann Reynolds, including her suspicion that the fire in which Angela's parents were killed was started deliberately. She is ostracised by the women and had her hair chopped off after she poisons fellow prisoner Dot Farrar. After stabbing Joan Ferguson and putting caustic soda in the women's shampoo bottles, she is transferred to a psychiatric hospital.
Episodes 481–557	Kath Deacon	Michele Sargent	One of Lou Kelly's gang, who lures Myra to be set up for the (unsuccessful) murder of Joan Ferguson.
Episodes 485–495	Kerryn Adele Davies	Jill Forster	A white-collar fraudster who finds it hard to cope with prison and separation from her husband, she hangs herself after going through menopause and being rejected by her husband.
Episodes 495–520	Samantha "Sam" Greenway	Robyn Gibbes	A young arts student, framed for drug possession. In Wentworth she asks for her real parents to be traced, and learns that her real name is Julie Ann Cameron. After being denied permission to see her mother, she escapes to visit her and meets her sister Sally. Sally is happy to see Sam, but her mother tells Sam that she wants nothing to do with her and orders her to leave. Sam turns herself in and is returned to Wentworth; Ann Reynolds says that shortly after Sam's incarceration, her mother said that she did not want to see her. Ann did not tell Sam because she thought Sally could convince her mother to come around. Sally visits Sam to explain why her mother rejected her, and says that she can still be her sister; Sam says that if she doesn't have a mother, she doesn't have a sister either. She is electrocuted by a wired door handle which had been set up for Myra by Lou Kelly and Alice Jenkins.
Episodes 499–533	Matt Delaney	Peter Bensley	One of a trio of male prisoners transferred to Wentworth for their safety after they foiled a mass break-out attempt. Suspected of being gay, he marries Marlene Warren.
Episodes 500–556	Geoff Macrae	Leslie Dayman	The unofficial top dog of the male inmates transferred from Woodridge, he becomes romantically involved with top-dog Myra Desmond and is last seen at her funeral.
Episodes 500–555	Francis Joseph "Frank" Burke	Trevor Kent	The last of the male Woodridge inmates moved to Wentworth, Frank is a convicted rapist who rapes Pixie Mason. He escapes and takes revenge on Dennis Cruikshank by shooting him, leaving him paralysed.
Episodes 504–516	Yemil Bakarta	Maria Mercedes	A Middle Eastern Islamic inmate charged with causing a car accident when attempting to escape from her brutal husband. She attacks Dennis Cruickshank, believing him to be Frank Burke, although Judy takes the blame. Released on a bond, Yemil writes to Ann that Judy was innocent to pave the way for her release.
Episodes 509–650	Alexis "Lexie" Patterson	Pepe Trevor	A loud-mouth punk and card shark who spent her first few months in Boy George-style garb. She meets Jessie Windom, her real mother, inside for the first time. Suspected of being the Phantom Lagger, Lexie escapes and is hunted down by the killer of Nora Flynn. She is released with Nancy McCormack and given a fond farewell by Rita, Alice and Lorelei.
Episodes 514–600	Ethel May "Ettie" Parslow	Lois Ramsay	A senile old dear who has been imprisoned since the Second World War due to a bureaucratic mix-up. She develops a close relationship with Meg Morris when it turns out that Ettie nursed her as a newborn in prison. After getting released and $250,000 compensation, she gets herself put back inside by accidentally shooting a police officer. Released again, Ettie decides to run a halfway house where Ann Reynolds briefly works. She is last seen begging to be let into Wentworth to see Julie Egbert on her birthday.
Episodes 514–528	Janice Mary Grant	Jenny Ludlam	A sophisticated solicitor, imprisoned for dangerous driving. Janice is an alcoholic in withdrawal. Lou Kelly quickly catches onto her alcoholism, and supplies her with methylated spirits. Despite Myra and Ettie's attempts to sober her up, she gets alcohol from Lou, Alice and Frank. Janice takes an interest in Ettie's case (imprisoned for 45 years without a trial), and pushes for her to be compensated. Alice and Lexie force her to drink grain alcohol and she is sent to a psychiatric ward, where Ettie pays for her best possible treatment.
Episodes 519–534	Sheila "Shelly" Brady	Colleen Hewett	A misfit remand inmate, inside for heroin possession, with a secret singing talent. Acquitted and released, she is seen on TV by Judy after making "Pixie's Song" a chart hit. Judy tries to sue her; they agree that she will write an album of songs for Sheila and join her on tour, and she drives off with Judy for stardom.
Episodes 526–536	Anita Selby	Diane Craig	A nun imprisoned for causing a disturbance at a nuclear-disarmament demonstration. Anita's goodness and willingness to seek virtue in others brought a brief moral calm to Wentworth, its prisoners and staff. The perfect foil for cellmate Lou Kelly and evil officer Joan Ferguson, she is released on bail and last seen having a heart-to-heart with Joan.
Episodes 537–588	Nora Flynn	Sonja Tallis	A long-term, self-reformed prisoner transferred from Barnhurst. The new top dog after the death of Myra Desmond, she had served 23 years for her involvement in the thrill-kill murder of three hitch-hikers. Despite appearing to be reformed, Flynn is repeatedly denied parole. When she arrives she has already escaped once from prison and gotten pregnant, but a scuffle with Lou triggers a miscarriage. Learning that her mother has died and with little left to live for, she escapes again. Her body is dumped outside the prison; she had been hunted down and killed by an ex-policeman serial killer with a grudge against prisoners.
Episodes 537–587	"Auntie" May Collins	Billie Hammerberg	An earthy career criminal who is a noted cat burglar. Although older, May is tough and watches out for younger, more vulnerable prisoners. After her escape, she works with a gang to rob an art gallery and is shot in the chest.
Episodes 537–682	Wilhelmina "Willie" Beecham	Kirsty Child	May Collins' partner in crime. Willie was a fence on the outside and runs a bartering business in prison. Snobbish, she often antagonises the women with her supercilious attitude. When offered the opportunity of a full pardon, May and Willie work with the police to expose a new criminal syndicate. When May is shot and killed, Willie makes sure that everyone at Wentworth knows and feels that she no longer has anyone who cares for her. She returns for a surprising, one-off appearance late in the series as an employee whom Joan sees for a job.
Episodes 537–628	Julie "Chook" Egbert	Jackie Woodburne	A shy, intelligent young girl who stole from her workplace to help her terminally-ill mother. She is returned to Barnhurst until her release so she can live with her new husband, Steve Ryan.
Episodes 537–590	Daphne "Daffy" Graham	Debra Lawrance	A garden-loving inmate who had been a juvenile offender. It is later discovered that Daphne's crime and subsequent self-harm in prison is linked to extreme PMT. Ben Fulbright, later to marry Pippa Reynolds, fought for her release on these grounds. She leaves Wentworth, and is briefly seen on TV making her situation known to the public. A personal assistant to Ruth Ballinger during her time in Wentworth.
Episodes 538–552	Ruth Ballinger	Lindy Davies	The shady wife of an international drug baron, remanded to Wentworth with special privileges in the hope that she will assist the federal police with their efforts to nail her husband's drug trade. One of the few prisoners to ruffle Joan Ferguson's feathers, when Joan learns that she was involved with child pornography. Ruth's time in the series climaxes with a three-episode terrorist siege, when her husband sends a team of armed mercenaries to spring her from Wentworth. After she escapes, she is caught at the airport and transferred to Blackmoor. (Joan phones Cynthia Leach to have Ruth "taken care of".) Otherwise ruthless and cold, Ruth seems to care for Daphne Graham; giving handouts to the other women, Daphne is given a cell full of plants in return for her work.
Episodes 540–588	Jennifer Elise "Jenny" Hartley	Jenny Lovell	A young woman on remand, declaring her innocence of the murder of her wealthy grandmother. Introduced as a friend of Pippa Reynolds, she is a professional pianist who teaches Daphne Graham to play. During the Ballinger siege, terrorists torture her with a mock execution. After she learns that her lawyer is being paid by her aunt to conceal evidence, she fires him and appoints detective Howard Simmons. Jenny is released after her uncle is arrested for murdering her aunt and confesses her grandmother's murder, and is last seen when she decides to leave Ann's house to look for a flat of her own.
Episodes 556–573	Queenie Marshall	Marilyn Rodgers	A sassy prostitute who becomes a friend to the women on the outside when they need her help to ensure that Nikki Lennox does not end up in prison. Queenie leads to Andrew Fry's resignation, since he is known as her best customer.
Episodes 568–574	Nicole "Nikki" Lennox	Vicki Mathios	The self-imposed leader of the juvenile delinquents sent to Wentworth to spend time with convicted criminals as part of a "scared straight" scheme. She antagonises Lexie Patterson when she cheats at cards. Nora, May and Willie team up with Queenie Marshall on the outside to ensure that she never returns to prison.
Episodes 568–574	Cindy Moran	Robyn Frank	Another juvenile offender sent to Wentworth to be scared straight. She attacks May and discovers Daphne's body.
Episodes 568–569	Lisa Snell	Liza Bermingham	Another juvenile offender sent to Wentworth to be scared straight, she cannot cope with life on the inside and asks Ann Reynolds to send her home.
Episodes 568–569	Joanna "Jo" James	Nicole Dixon	Another juvenile offender sent to Wentworth to be scared straight. Forced to participate in a pharmacy robbery by Nikki (who escapes while Jo is caught by the police), she is transferred to a young offenders' centre.
Episodes 574–600	Eve Marie Wilder	Lynda Stoner	A beautiful, sinister socialite who proclaims her innocence of shooting Robin, a man with whom she had been having an affair. After her first solicitor tells her that the police cannot find any bullets where she claims to have shot Robin, Eve asks for another solicitor and David Adams is appointed. She learns from Pippa Reynolds that David's marriage has just broken up; in a flashback, Eve really shot Robin after he told her that their affair was over. Eve flirts with David, persuading him to go to her apartment and destroy any incriminating evidence. After she learns that officer Joyce Barry has been listening to their conversations she beats her senseless with the door, drags her into a cell and bashes her with a kettle (letting Reb Kean take the blame). Eve tries to convince David to kill her whilst she is in a coma, but he leaves a note for Ann Reynolds before shooting himself in front of Eve. Notes signed "the Phantom Lagger" are later found around the prison informing officers of prisoner activity, and Eve joins Lou Kelly to try to discover the identity of their author. Eve begins trading information with Joan Ferguson; Alice overhears a conversation between Eve and Joan in which Eve admits that she is the Phantom Lagger, and Eve is hanged by Lou Kelly during a riot.
Episodes 585–692	Rita "The Beater" Connors	Glenda Linscott	A spirited bikie who arrives inside for grievous bodily harm and becomes the series' third long-running top dog. Rita brings down Joan Ferguson, and resigns as top dog when she develops terminal cancer.
Episodes 586–602	Barbara "Barbie" CoxBarbara Cox	Jayne Healey	A daffy young woman whose vocabulary is limited to "Hi-de-hi!" and "Naughty, naughty!" It is unknown why Barbie is in prison. She is released with Jesse Windom, but returns in the following episode to throw tennis balls filled with alcohol to the women.
Episodes 589–650	Nancy May McCormack	Julia Blake	A demure, dignified housewife imprisoned for killing her abusive husband. Nancy is covering up for her son (who accidentally killed his father during a fight), and is released with Lexie Patterson.
Episodes 589–620	Jessie Windom	Pat Evison	A no-nonsense, resourceful former madam who is deliberately imprisoned to search for Lexie Patterson, the daughter she gave away years earlier. She is released, and later takes Lexie's son until Lexie is released.
Episodes 592–691	Ida Brown	Paddy Burnet	Rita Connors' formidable, elderly aunt who is involved with Rita's biker gang. She is last seen visiting Rita.
Episodes 594–601	Fay Donnelly	Maud Clark	A tall, lanky crony of Lou Kelly.
Episodes 595–643	Rachel "Roach" Waters	Linda Hartley	A young punk inside for armed robbery. "Roach", the girlfriend of Rita Connors' brother Bongo (Shane Connor), escapes on work release.
Episodes 598–601	Wendy Stone	Vivien Davies	A short prisoner with wild hair (and teeth) who supports Lou Kelly with Faye Donnelly during the riots. She bashes Julie, who becomes involved with Dr. Steve after he treats her. Wendy and Faye are transferred to D Block after the riots.
Episodes 599–639	Janet "Maggot" Williams	Christine Earle	A thug who becomes an offsider of several top-dog wannabes and murders Lou Kelly. She is transferred to A Block after a bashing by Kath Maxwell.
Episodes 601–692	Katherine Lorraine "Kath" Maxwell	Kate Hood	A middle-class woman imprisoned for killing her terminally-ill, disabled daughter. Initially brutalised by the other women, Kath becomes the series' last top dog.
Episodes 608–692	Vicki McPherson	Rebecca Dines	A wisecracking inmate who becomes an ally of Kath Maxwell and "Spider" Simpson.
Episodes 623–677	Lurlene "Lorelei" Wilkinson	Paula Duncan	A vivacious con artist, imprisoned for posing as a policewoman. She becomes menatlly unstable and is transferred to Ingleside Mental Institution after stabbing Ernest Craven.
Episodes 625–692	Merle "Loony" Jones	Rosanne Hull-Brown	A mentally-disabled, illiterate prisoner, initially ridiculed by the other women, who is befriended by Kath Maxwell. She escapes with Kath, but is left behind after an injury and sent to a psychiatric hospital. Later returned to Wentworth, Kath makes several attempts to make up with her and they eventually reconcile.
Episodes 645–691	Margie Anson	Samantha Carter	Beaten up by Kath and Vicki as part of Kath's bid to take over as top dog, she backs off helping Spider unload contraband when a van is searched and stands guard while Spike fixes the playback of Lisa's tape of Rodney.
Episodes 649–686	Rose "Spider" Simpson	Taya Straton	A sneering career criminal who takes charge of all rackets and contraband trading at Wentworth. Jealous of Spike Marsh, she is transferred to Barnhurst.
Episodes 651–692	Lisa Marie Mullins	Nicki Paull/Terrie Waddell	A young woman arrested for operating a prostitution and blackmail racket. Played by Nikki Paul for six episodes until Paul became ill and the role was taken over by Waddell.
Episodes 651–659	Wendy Glover	Julieanne Newbould	Undercover policewoman Tricia Haynes, sent to Wentworth to shadow endangered inmate Lisa Mullins and gather information about her case. When the women find out, Wendy is bashed and her forehead is tattooed with the word "cop." She is last seen visiting Lisa to tell her that her boyfriend, Lester, is dead.
Episodes 658–668	Sarah West	Kylie Belling	A fiery, impulsive Aboriginal inmate who is abused by racist inmates, especially Spider and Vicki. To get back at the women, Sarah sets up a tripod which releases hydrochloric-acid gas through the air conditioning. Rita eventually gets through to Sarah and Pamela traces her foster parents, who tell Sarah that her mother is dead and her white father is an alcoholic. She is transferred to Barnhurst for her safety after Craven's threats to Pamela.
Episodes 665–692	Michelle "Brumby" Tucker	Sheryl Munks	A young prisoner, first seen at Blackmoor, who is a misfit and troublemaker.
Episodes 665–691	Margaret "Spike" Marsh	Victoria Rowland	"Brumby"'s best friend at Blackmoor, who was framed for heroin trafficking. "Spike", a university science student before her imprisonment, keeps her middle-class background hidden from the other prisoners. She is released to be with her parents.
Episodes 668–684	Billy Slocum	Glennan Fahey	A Blackmoor prisoner transferred to Wentworth after its riot and fire, first seen when Merle tries to trade comics with him. Craven lets him and Stud Wilson into solitary to rape Lorelei; when the women find out, they are held hostage and mentally tortured in a storeroom. He is returned to Blackmoor.
Episodes 668–684	"Stud" Wilson	Peter Lindsay	Another transferred Blackmoor inmate. A convicted rapist and an underling of governor Ernest Craven, he is returned to Blackmoor.
Episodes 679–692	Harry Grosvenor	Mike Bishop	A Blackmoor prisoner moved to Wentworth, he becomes a love interest for Alice Jenkins. Harry is transferred to Barnhurst in the last episode, telling Alice that he loves her.
Episode 692	Helen Stephens	Anna McCrossin	The series' last prisoner, transferred from Barnhurst and impressed by how Kath handles Rodney Adams.

== See also ==
- List of Prisoner characters – prison staff
- List of Prisoner characters – miscellaneous
