= Centrespread =

- Film poster
- Directed by: Tony Paterson
- Written by: Michael Ralph Robert Fogden; Uncredited: Tony Paterson
- Produced by: Wayne Groom
- Starring: Kylie Foster; Paul Trahir
- Cinematography: Geoffrey Simpson
- Edited by: Tony Paterson
- Music by: John Sharp
- Distributed by: Greg Lynch Film Distributors
- Release date: July 1981
- Running time: 82 minutes
- Country: Australia
- Language: English
- Budget: A$600,000 or $125,000

Centrespread is a futuristic Ozploitation movie about a jaded photographer for sex magazines who has been commissioned to find a girl with "a new look, a different approach, someone for the new century".

== Story ==
In a totalitarian future, where sex is associated with violence, women are presented for the entertainment and comfort of men, courtesy of a magazine run by a computer called 'Central', which controls a stratified future of sectors and plastic credit – get on a shoot and your sector status goes up.

Gerard (Paul Trahir), a photographer who works for Central, specialises in images of violent sexuality. His first photo session involves a Droog (John Nobbs) who threatens a nude Bald Lady (Helina Hamilton). Wielding machetes, it looks as if the Droog is about to decapitate the lady, but she suddenly disappears into a fog that saturates the shoot.

Next up is a leather-clad Rapist (Mark Bonnet) who rides his bike past an equally leather-clad Motorbike Girl (Brenda Knowles). The girl pulls out a knife and cuts the man as he rides past, and he falls off his bike, seemingly dead. But when the girl checks the body, he comes alive, strips and rapes her, mauling her breasts with his blood-stained hands.

Gerard is told to find a new girl whose freshness will rejuvenate the pages of the magazine – a look for the new century, and they're running out of time for this new look. He meets Niki (Kylie Foster), a nice girl who works in an antique shop because it gives her a sense of belonging.

Further photo shoots follow, before Gerard shoots the models taking off their make-up (and inevitably their clothes). But eventually Niki converts Gerard to the notion of love, and a life away from his cruel work for Central. Eventually, Gerard is demoted to D sector to photograph animals, and the young defiant lovers stand together at Light's Vision in Adelaide, as they commit to each other.

== Production ==
The script was written by Michael Ralph and Robert Fogden. Both were art directors on the film.

Tony Paterson, who was the director on the film, had previously worked as an editor, and Greg Lynch expressed full confidence in him in the March–April 1981 edition of Cinema Papers:

"I have known Tony Paterson for quite a while, and to me he is the best editor in the business. In fact, most of the films that come into this country that are cut, restructured or edited to suit the local market are done by Tony. He is absolutely brilliant. So, while we took a punt on Tony, I believed he could do the job. It is hard to explain, because in our business you get gut feelings about people..."

Producer Wayne Groom said they "want to find an unknown girl" for the lead "and make her a star."

The movie was shot in Adelaide at the South Australian Film Corporation's studios. Filming began in September 1980.

Centrespread also claimed to be the first Australian feature film to be shot on super 16mm and blown up to 35mm for theatrical release. This format would later become popular in Australia in the 1980s for low budget features, as the additional frame area helped with picture quality, and avoided the perceived curse of a film being labelled as 16mm rather than 35mm (such films were usually presented as 35mm shows, with mention of 16mm muted or altogether forgotten). Fred Harden, in an article on new products and processes for Cinema Papers' January–February 1982 edition explained:

"The Aaton has a Super 16 option incorporated in the initial camera design. In under an hour, with replacement of the aperture plate, viewing screen and changing the optical centre of the lens, the camera is converted from standard 16mm to Super 16. The ready availability of this camera and the required conversion of equipment being made by laboratories to handle and print Super 16 has led to Atlab's recent high quality 16mm to 35 mm blow-up of the first Australian Super 16 feature, Centrespread. Already four new features and six documentaries have been announced as shooting in the Super 16 format this year."

Tony Paterson was exceptionally pleased with the results of the new format, as he explained to Fred Harden in Cinema Papers' January–February 1982 edition:

"Shooting Super 16mm is much more controllable than when we used 16mm on Mouth to Mouth, for instance. The framing on that was a bit of a guess because we didn't have a scribed viewfinder. No one, even at the projection stage, really knew where the top of the frame was. I got to be able to work it out by putting Academy leader in the gate and remembering the cut off.

On Centrespread, we used up to a No. 3 diffusion filter because we wanted to cut down on the contrast. By comparison, there are parts of Mouth to Mouth that are actually too sharp. They are too clear and too bright. I suppose it is contrast, but they just look too sharp. There should have been a little more atmosphere so one's brain could imagine what it is seeing a little bit. On Centrespread, though, there were no problems: it was there every time. It was just like cutting a 35mm film: your eye does the same scan across the frame...

Geoff Simpson had just bought it (an Aaton camera). Other than a blow-out on the first day on the first 400-ft roll, where everyone pointed fingers at each other, the camera shot rock steady from the first foot. It is an excellent machine..."

Paterson enjoyed working with 16mm both on the shoot and in editing:

"When we shot Centrespread in South Australia, we modified a Bauer. It was an arc, I think, and a massive light source, so there was no trouble re-centring the light. It looked quite spectacular on the screen because the last thing I did there was The Survivor and that was in 'Panawank' and it was shot under low-light levels because it was mostly a night shoot. My experience of looking at those rushes, and then six weeks later going back to see the Centrespread material that was fully lit and crisp, was that you wouldn't believe Centrespread was 16mm. Both were shot well, but your eye gets hungry on the big screen after a while. It is all right when it's cut, but looking at hours and hours of rushes of dark images you start suffering from color starvation. The Super 16 looked great by comparison..."

== Reception ==
The film was released in 1981. David Stratton described the film as "atrocious". Most reviews were poor.
