= The Dolebludgers =

- Written by: John Martin
- Directed by: David Zweck
- Starring: Di Smith; Paul Jones; Tim Robertson; Val Lehman; Carol Burns
- Country of origin: Australia
- Original language: English

Production
- Running time: 70 minutes

Original release
- Network: ABC
- Release: 1979

The Dolebludgers is a 1979 Australian TV movie about teenagers looking for work.

== Cast ==
- Carol Burns as Shirley
- Paul Jones as Sheepdog
- Val Lehman as Mrs Price
- Tim Robertson as Mr Price
- Di Smith as Debbie Price
