= Melissa Doyle =

Australian television presenter (born 1970)

Melissa Doyle AM
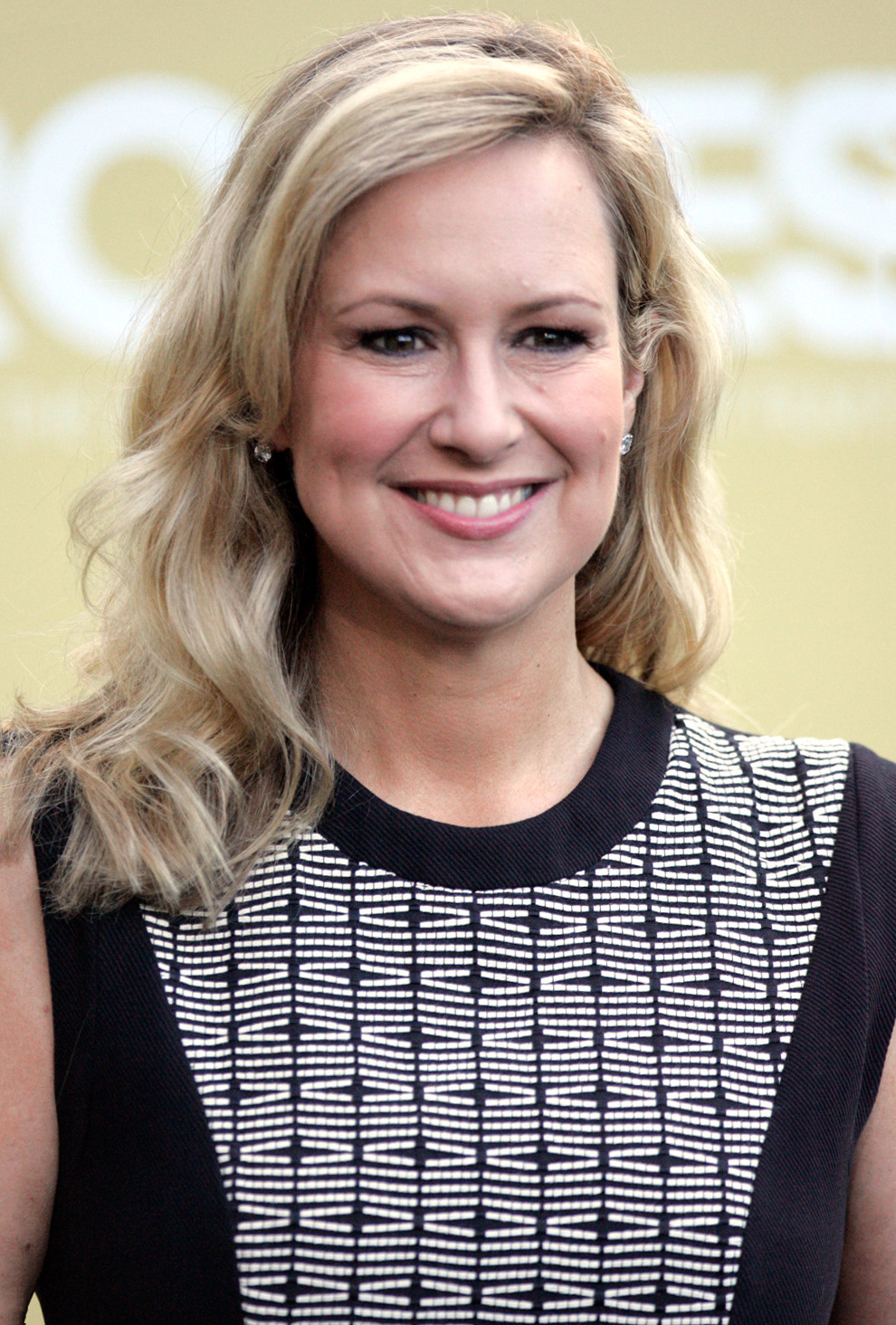
- Doyle in 2013
- Born: 10 February 1970 (age 56); Sydney, New South Wales, Australia
- Education: Charles Sturt University
- Occupations: Journalist; television presenter; radio presenter; author
- Years active: 1990–present
- Notable credits: Sunrise co-host (2002–2013); Seven News Sydney (2015–2019); Sunday Night (2015–2019)
- Children: 2

Melissa Jane Doyle (born 10 February 1970) is an Australian television presenter, author and journalist.

She was previously co-host of the Seven Network's breakfast television program Sunrise from 2002 to 2013 alongside David Koch and host and senior correspondent of Sunday Night.

Doyle is currently host of Weekend Breakfast on Smooth FM.

== Early life and training ==
Doyle attended Pymble Ladies' College. She studied communications at Charles Sturt University at the Bathurst campus and during her studies she was a broadcaster with on-campus community radio station 2MCE-FM.

== Career ==
Doyles started her career, when she gained a cadetship at WIN Television's Canberra bureau in 1990, later becoming their weather presenter. Doyle then moved to Prime Television in 1993, where she was a news anchor and general reporter.

After her stint at Prime ended in 1995, Doyle joined the Seven Network (which was Prime's affiliation partner at the time) as a Canberra-based political reporter before moving to Sydney where she read the news on 11AM, reported the news and read the afternoon updates. Doyle was one of the original hosts of the breakfast television program Sunrise before it was axed in 1999, before being resurrected in 2000, and which she rejoined in 2002. In 1999, she was the fill in presenter of the last bulletin of 11AM due to the incumbent presenter Anne Fulwood having already relocated to Melbourne. She also had a stint reading the Seven Late News.

In 2000, she took over as host of Sydney's Today Tonight following the departure of Stan Grant. She stayed until March 2001 when she went on maternity leave.

Doyle supports the Greater Western Sydney Giants AFL team; in 2012, she was named as the GWS Giants' inaugural No. 1 Ticket Holder.

=== Sunrise ===
Doyle returned to Seven from maternity leave in a variety of news and presenting roles before being asked to front a revamped Sunrise program with Chris Reason, who was later replaced by David Koch. Together, Doyle and Koch under the guidance of Executive producer Adam Boland, surpassed their incumbent opposition and market leaders, Today on the Nine Network. They built the program from a virtually zero viewer base to be the leading breakfast television program in Australia and there it remained throughout Doyle's tenure on the program. She was then dubbed the 'Queen of Australian Brekky TV'.

In 2003, Doyle enjoyed a very public pregnancy with her second child, who was born in December of that year.

Doyle was nominated for the Silver Logie as Most Popular Television Presenter in 2006, 2007, 2008, 2009 and 2010. She was the only female nominated in that category.

Doyle was involved in legal proceedings in which it was alleged she identified a minor who was divorcing his parents. The divorce case was being heard in the Victorian Children's Court and because the boy was only 14 years old he couldn't be named. But Sunrise, as well as a number of other news outlets, including the Sunday Herald Sun and Today Tonight, allegedly identified him and the journalists/presenters were charged with contempt of court. The journalists and presenters/hosts were all acquitted but the Seven Network, its news director, Today Tonight's executive producer and the Sunday Herald Sun and its editor-in-chief were convicted.

While at the helm of Sunrise she was at the front line of many of Australia's biggest stories of the era including, but not limited to, Beaconsfield Mine collapse and the 2010–11 Queensland floods, and international stories such as the Royal Wedding.

On 20 June 2013, Doyle announced that she would be stepping down as Sunrise co-host to take on a national role within the Seven Network. She presented her final show on 9 August of the same year. Her farewell program was the highest rating edition of the show that year.

=== After Sunrise ===
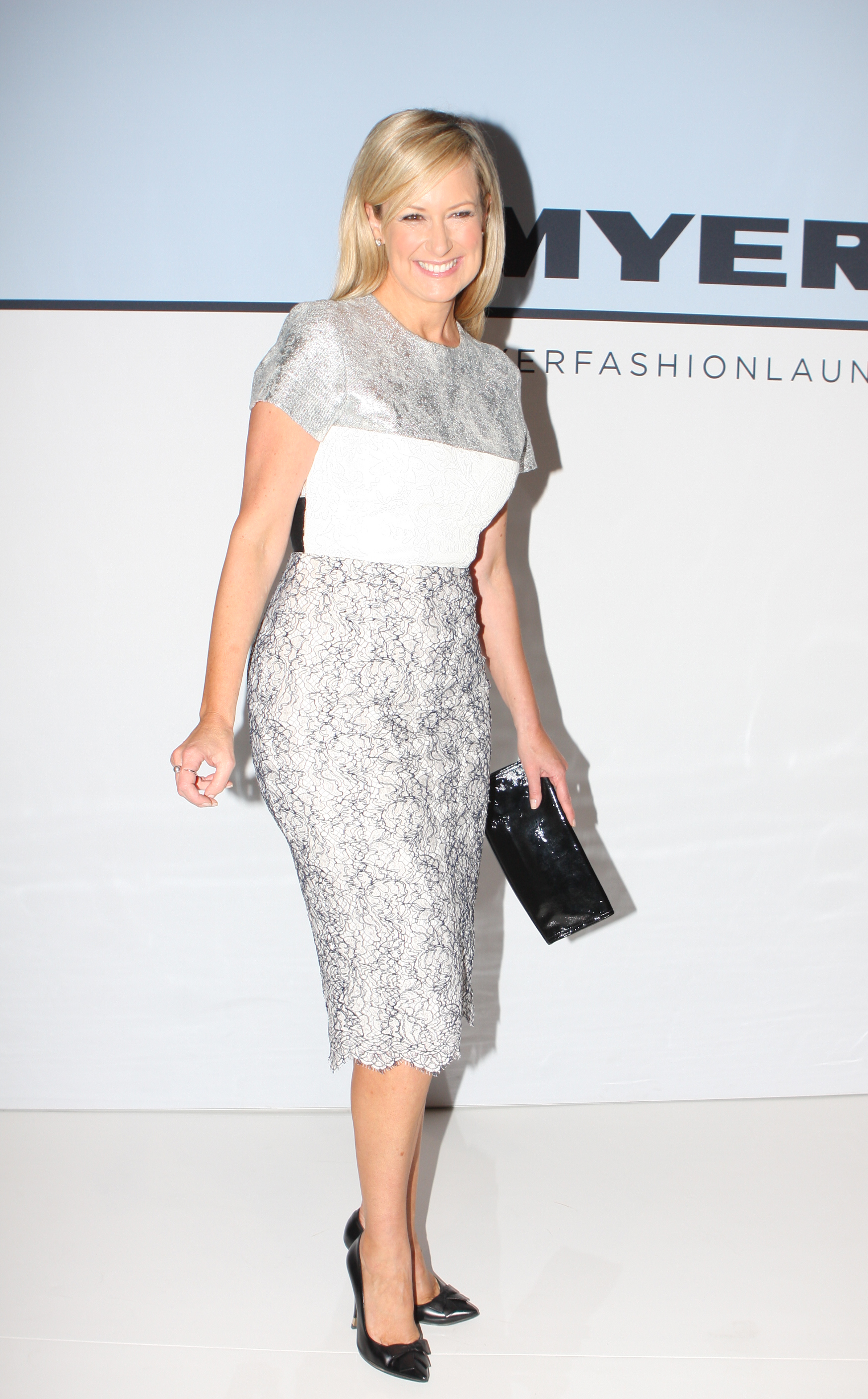
Doyle in 2015

It was revealed in August 2013 that Doyle would present a new national bulletin of Seven Afternoon News at 4pm on weekdays with former Today Tonight host Matt White, as well as a new national bulletin Seven News at 7 on Seven's digital channel 7two. This bulletin was discontinued in May 2014.

Doyle began presenting Seven News at 7 on 12 August and Seven Afternoon News on 19 August. Doyle also hosted the first debate of the 2013 federal election between Labor leader and then Prime Minister Kevin Rudd and Liberal leader Tony Abbott, on 7two on 11 August. She was also a part of the 2013 federal election broadcast with Chris Bath, Mark Riley and Matt White.

In December 2013, Doyle co-hosted Carols in the Domain with Matt White.

In June 2015, it was announced that Doyle would replace Chris Bath on Sunday Night and Seven News Sydney due to Bath's resignation from the Seven Network. Doyle signed off from Seven Afternoon News for the last time in late July.

In August 2016, it was announced that Doyle would move into a new expanding role as host and senior correspondent on Sunday Night. As a result of Melissa's new position Michael Usher replaced her on Seven News Sydney.

In October 2019, Sunday Night was cancelled and it was announced Doyle would remain with the Seven Network in a variety of news reading roles.

In March 2020, Doyle joined Michael Usher to host Seven News: The Latest throughout the COVID-19 pandemic. She subsequently became the permanent Monday presenter of the bulletin. Melissa remained in this role until August.

In August 2020, Doyle announced that she would be leaving the Seven Network after 25 years with the network.

In July 2022, it was announced Doyle would return to the Seven Network to host the reboot of This is Your Life. The first episode, which aired on 24 July 2022, featured Olympic swimmer Ian Thorpe.

In March 2025, it was announced that Doyle would co-host the Seven Network's House of Wellness alongside Shane Crawford. The show combines discussions, humour, and wellness advice, featuring a dynamic lineup of experts, personalities, and special guests.

=== Radio ===
In October 2013, Doyle joined smoothfm to host Weekend Breakfast from 6 am to 10 am. The program has continued to grow in popularity with her show recording the highest ever market share percentage in the June 2014 Rating Survey and making the program the #2 FM weekend breakfast program for All People 10+. In the coveted Females 40–54 ratings segment, Doyle's program was the #1 FM Weekend Breakfast program, recording its highest ever share result in the June ratings survey and the only FM station with over 20% share.

In October 2014, Doyle won Best Newcomer On-Air (Metro) at the Australian Commercial Radio Awards.

In October 2018, Doyle won Best Music Presenter at the Australian Commercial Radio Awards.

=== Other work ===
In October 2007, Doyle's first book, The Working Mothers Survival Guide (co-written with Jo Scard), was published by Allen & Unwin. It sold over 10,000 copies in its first print run. In 2014, she released her second book, Alphabet Soup. The memoir was the biggest selling Australian memoir in the market during its first few months on bookshelves. Doyle and Koch also co-hosted another Seven Network production Where Are They Now?.

In 2008, Doyle was selected to front a new documentary program on the Seven Network called The Zoo. The show had a six-week run during the first half of 2008. A second series of The Zoo commenced on air in October 2008. It generated an audience of over 1.7 million people in each of its first three weeks making it one of the Top Five Programs on Australian television for that week, and one of the highest ranking programs of the year.

Doyle previously wrote a weekly column in Australia's highest selling newspaper, the Sunday Herald Sun in Melbourne called "Balancing Act". The column talked about her experiences as a working mother.

In March 2021, Doyle joined Sky News Australia for a special assignment to interview Kylie Moore-Gilbert, an Australian academic convicted and imprisoned in Iran for spying.

In February 2022, Doyle as an investigative journalist narrated a new documentary series on the Nine Network, titled Australia Behind Bars with Melissa Doyle, based on the British version which examines the life of inmates incarcerated, and has been described as a real life Wentworth.

In November 2022, Doyle released her third book, 15 Seconds of Brave. The former Sunrise co-host reunited with her former colleagues, nine years after leaving Brekky Central to promote her new book.

In 2024, Doyle appeared in episode 6, season 15 of documentary reality genealogy series Who Do You Think You Are?, tracing her family tree back to New Zealand.

== Charity work ==
Doyle is the National Patron for Make-A-Wish Foundation Australia and an ambassador for The Alannah and Madeline Foundation, Westmead Children's Hospital, World Vision, Children's Cancer Institute and the National Breast Cancer Foundation. Melissa is also an ambassador for the Federal Government's National Road Safety Council and is the Number One Ticket Holder for the GWS Giants (AFL) and Whittlesea Eagles (Vic AFL). She was also the Chairperson for the GIANTS Foundation Charity, established in 2013 and served in this role until 2018, when she was appointed to the Board of Directors of the GIANTS in 2018.

== Honours and award nominations ==
Doyle was appointed a Member of the Order of Australia in 2016 for significant service to the community through representational roles with a range of charitable groups, and to the broadcast media.

Institution	Year	Award	Work	Results
Logie Award	2006	Silver Logie Award of Most Popular Presenter	Sunrise	Nominated
Logie Awards	2007	Silver Logie Award for Best TV presenter	Sunrise	Nominated
Logie Awards	2008	Silver Logie for Best TV presenter	Sunrise	Nominated
Logie Awards	2009	Silver Award for Best TV Presenter	Sunrise	Nominated
Logie Awards	2010	Silver Logie Award for Best TV Presenter	Sunrise	Nominated
