= Girl Clock! =

- Film poster
- Directed by: Jennifer Ussi
- Written by: Adam Couper; Jennifer Ussi
- Produced by: Jennifer Ussi
- Starring: Veronica Neave
- Cinematography: Nicola Daley
- Production company: Girl Clock Films
- Distributed by: Girl Clock Films
- Release date: 25 February 2010
- Running time: 88 minutes
- Country: Australia
- Language: English
- Budget: under $1 million (including deferrals)
- Box office: A$43,434 (Australia)

Girl Clock! is a 2010 Australian comedy feature film directed and produced by Jennifer Ussi and written by Adam Couper and Jennifer Ussi. The film stars Veronica Neave in the leading role, with Queenie van de Zandt and Catarina Hebbard as supporting cast.

Christine is over 40 and wants to have a baby. She seeks support from best friends Mikki and Margo.

== Plot ==
Christine is a globe-trotting photographer whose life-long friends are Margo and Mikki. She is unenthusiastically dating Bob, who welcomes her back by having them wax his car. Her idea of travel is Tibet whereas he proposes a trip to Italy in a distant future, although they've been together only 9 weeks.

Back home in Australia, Chris works in Dave's portrait studio. Shortly after she has broken up with Bob, she realises she's missed her period so takes a pregnancy test. It comes up negative, which she is relieved about. However, she wakes up one morning realising that her biological clock is running out and that she really wants a baby. Having been a lifelong commitment-phobe, Chris has no idea how to maintain a relationship, yet is drawn to having a baby.

When she turns to her close, life-long friends Margo and Mikki for support, she finds them also in crisis. Margo is desperately trying to maintain her recently emptied nest child-free as Karla is off at uni, and Mikki is obsessed with battling with time and gravity's effect on her body.

Margo's son Simon has tried to return home as his girlfriend has kicked him out, but initially she sends him off to stay in a motel. Her husband Keith helps him move some things to theirs shortly after, as his girlfriend wants them to take a break. Simon suggests they invite her and his sister Karla to dinner in a few weeks to change her mind. His room is now Margo's art and yoga studio, so he sets up in Karla's old room.

Mikki's boyfriend Tom has just moved in and expresses surprise that she told him she's 5 years younger than she actually is as he doesn't care. Now she feels old, saggy and invisible. Tom combats this by constantly leaving her little positive post-its throughout their apartment.

After Chris accidentally kills an elderly woman's dog, she shows up to her home. She soon realises the woman is all alone, with no children either, and offers to help bury it. She calls Bob to see if he'll donate sperm, but it works to anger him and help him move on.

Chris wakes with night sweats. Fearing menopause, she gets a checkup. She's OK, but is warned that pregnancy could be difficult, so she should increase her exercise and quit smoking. So she buys nicotine patches and a treadmill.

Neither Margo's husband, who couldn't get his head around it, nor Tom, who had a vasectomy, are viable options. So next, Chris has a series of misses to get impregnated to no avail.

Finally, Chris walks determinedly into the IVF clinic and finally meets Paolo, a man she's bumped into a number of times. He regularly donates there, so she spontaneously asks him to privately donate to her. He makes them dinner, they go up to his bedroom and she enters the bathroom while he undresses. When she comes out, he's dead.

Chris calls her friends over, and Mikki confirms he must have had an aneurysm. Acting quickly, as she happens to have syringes in her purse, they extract semen directly from his testicles and Chris reinjects it into her. As they extracted a lot there is enough to try again twice more. Mikki extracts enough to be able to put in condoms she finds in Chris's bag, which she and Margo put in their own vaginas to maintain a good temperature before freezing them for future tries.

One evening a few days later, the friends decide enough time has passed to do the test. When Mikki mentions they were from Chris's bag, Chris reveals she had poked holes in those condoms. They go together to the chemist's for tests for them all. They take the simultaneously and all are unhappy.

In the closing, we see the three friends and two husbands take turns pushing the two babies in strollers on a sunny afternoon.

== Cast ==
- Veronica Neave as Christine
- Queenie van de Zandt as Margo
- Catarina Hebbard as Mikki
- Tarah Carey as Karla
- Sean Dennehy as Bob
- Steven Tandy as Dave
- Jamie Dunn as Keith
- Hari Jago as Simon
- Kerith Atkinson as Waitress
- Adam Couper as Tom
- Carol Burns as Ms Thompson
- Mirko Grillini as Paolo

== Production ==
Girl Clock! was filmed in Brisbane without assistance from local funding bodies.

== Release ==
The film was self-distributed by its writer-director with assistance from Peter Castaldi. It was screened in several cinemas.
