= Bethany Lee =

Australian actress (1952–2003)

- Born: January 26, 1952; Adelaide, South Australia
- Died: 22 September 2003 (aged 51)
- Occupations: Stage, film and television actress
- Years active: 1970–81; 1986
- Children: Noah John Weller

Bethany Lee (January 26, 1952 - September 22, 2003) was an Australian former film, television and theatre actress. She guest starred on numerous television series during the 1970s, including recurring roles on The Long Arm, Number 96 and Skyways, but is best known for her role as Andrea Hennessy in the cult soap opera Prisoner.

== Career ==
Bethany Lee made her television acting debut in 1970 with a recurring role on the television series The Long Arm as well as guest appearances on Division 4 and Homicide.

In 1973, she played the lead female in the film adaptation of Come Out Fighting and had a brief stint on Number 96 during early 1974. Her character was introduced as the "chaste and studious schoolgirl" Penny Snow who, with classmate Colin Campbell (Steve Bannister), move into one of the vacant apartments as a squatter. Her character's mother, Trixie O'Toole (Jan Adele), moved into the building and eventually became one of the series' recurring favourites. Shortly before leaving the series, Penny Snow broke contact with her mother and disappeared. Her character was again referenced later in the series when Trixie O'Toole, in an attempt to deceive her father-in-law, George Snow, coerced Edie MacDonald (Wendy Blacklock) to impersonate Penny by dressing her in a school uniform. Lee later criticized the nudity in the series, specifically referring to a nude shower scene she had been required to do, in an interview with TV Week stating,

It wasn't the fact that I had to get my gear off that stirred me up. Although I don’t feel it's too good for a new actress to be seen in the raw. I don't want to get typecast. It was the fact that I had no warning that I would be required to do the nude scene until I actually arrived on the set. It made me feel like a piece of merchandise.

Lee again starred in a leading female role in the 1975 film The Firm Man. Between 1975–76, Lee guest starred on several television series, making return appearances on Division 4 and Homicide, but also including crime dramas Silent Number, Matlock Police, Bluey and historical dramas Tandarra and The Sullivans.

After a supporting role in the 1977 western film Raw Deal, Lee returned to television as a recurring character, Rhonda McDonald, on the drama series Skyways.

In 1980, Lee was cast her most memorable role as Andrea Hennessy in the soap opera Prisoner. Her character, a political activist, first appeared leading a protest for prisoners' rights outside the prison. It was at this same protest that her character became involved in a physical altercation with one of the prison officers, Colleen Powell (Judith McGrath), which results in her imprisonment. An attempt is made to free her by friends, Ricky Dunning (Kate Turner) and Linda Golman (Mary Charleston), and results in the kidnapping of the Governor, Erica Davidson (Patsy King). Ricky would be killed by police, while Linda later committed suicide in prison. Lee's character, becoming increasingly unpopular among the other inmates, was eventually transferred to another prison block to serve out her remaining sentence. Although this was her final television role, she would make a return appearance as another character, Edith Kipman, in 1986.
