= Mary Charleston =

Australian choreographer and actress

- Other names: Mary Charelston; Mary Charlston
- Occupations: Choreographer, film and television actress
- Years active: 1977–86; 2001

Mary Charleston is an Australian choreographer, film and television actress. She guest starred on several television films and series during the 1970s and early 1980s, best remembered as playing Linda Golman in the cult soap opera Prisoner, but also having appeared in the 1980 television miniseries The Last Outlaw and the 1986 war film Death of a Soldier.

== Career ==
Charleston got her start working as a dancer and made her television acting debut as a guest star on the police drama Cop Shop in 1977. She had a minor role in the 1978 film Mouth to Mouth, playing a massage parlor girl, and made another guest appearance on Skyways. In 1980, she appeared in the television miniseries The Last Outlaw. The next year, she was cast college political activist Linda Golman in the soap opera Prisoner. She and Kate Turner (Ricki Lee) were both introduced as friends and fellow activists of Andrea Hennessey, played by Bethany Lee, who kidnap the prison governor Erica Davidson (Patsy King). The kidnapping fails resulting in Ricki Lee being killed by the police and Linda Golman being sent to prison where she eventually commits suicide.

Following this appearance, Charleston decided to concentrate on her dance choreography career. She played the younger Heather McKean in the 1984 documentary film The Slim Dusty Movie. Her final acting role was in the 1986 war film Death of a Soldier. She was also the choreographer for director Alan Burrows' stage production of Cabaret with the Victoria-based CLOC Musical Theatre Company that same year. In 2001, Charleston became the choreographer for the television series Shock Jock.
