= Carol Burns =

Australian actress

- Carol Burns as Franky Doyle in TV series Prisoner (aka Prisoner: Cell Block H) in 1979
- Born: Carol Ann Burns; 29 October 1947; Brisbane, Queensland, Australia
- Died: 22 December 2015 (aged 68); Brisbane, Queensland, Australia
- Education: Brisbane Arts Theatre, Twelfth Night Theatre
- Occupations: Actress; theatre director; theatre founder (founding member of Queensland Theatre Company)
- Years active: 1965–2015
- Known for: Prisoner (AKA Prisoner: Cell Block H) as Franky Doyle
- Spouse: Alan Lawrence (1979–2015, her death)

Carol Ann Burns (29 October 1947 – 22 December 2015) was an Australian actress, theatre director and patron of the arts, with a career spanning 50 years. She worked extensively in theatre and television serials, as well as telemovies and mini-series in Australia and the United Kingdom. In Australia she was a founding member of the Queensland Theatre Company.

Burns was an original cast member, as Franky Doyle, in the serial Prisoner during the first season in 1979 and although she only appeared in the first 20 episodes, she became a major breakout and much loved character, and gained cult status as a fan favourite.

== Early life ==
Burns was born and raised in Brisbane, Queensland. Her mother Mary (née Langford) was a receptionist and her father William was a motor spare parts manager. She attended Milton State Primary School where her initiation into the world of theatre began with speech and drama classes in 1958. Burns acted with Brisbane Arts Theatre and also Twelfth Night Theatre, where she was a student of theatre director, Joan Whalley, and also tutored within the junior drama workshops, in Brisbane.

== Career ==
=== Television and film ===
Burns's major television role was her performance in the cult television program Prisoner, in which she played the tough but affable lesbian bikie character, Frieda "Franky" Doyle. Although only appearing in the first 20 episodes, her character attained cult status, resulting in her winning a Logie Award for Best Lead Actress in a Series. Burns stated in a 2011 interview that she left the show due to very low pay and an increased workload as a result of the more rapid production of episodes. She also stated that it was her decision to be killed off as she did not want to be lured back. After Burns's departure from the series the producers released a telemovie titled The Franky Doyle Story which they compiled using footage from the episodes in which Burns had participated.

Burns, an experienced and versatile theatre actress, went to the UK and appeared in numerous West End theatre productions and had roles in TV series such as The Bill, Taggart and Heartbeat. Burns also appeared in films, particularly during the late 1970s and 1980s, including The Mango Tree (1977), Bad Blood (1981), Starstruck (1982) and Strikebound (1984)

=== Theatre ===
Burns had acted exclusively in the theatre for ten years before film or television, based in Brisbane. In 2005, Burns performed in the Queensland Theatre Company's sell-out season of Edward Albee's production of The Goat, or Who is Sylvia?. As part of the 2007 season, she appeared in The Glass Menagerie by Tennessee Williams. She performed for La Boite Theatre. She was in a stage production of Elizabeth: Almost by Chance a Woman by Italian playwright Dario Fo. In 2015, Burns played, in what turned out to be her final performance, the lead role of Winnie in Samuel Beckett's Happy Days for Queensland Theatre Company.

Burns directed the Queensland Theatre Company productions of The Road to Mecca (2002) and A Day in the Death of Joe Egg (2003), as well as her own adaptation of Picnic at Hanging Rock (2013) at Brisbane Arts Theatre.

== Personal life and death ==
Burns was married to Alan Lawrence, a British-born musician and composer, for 36 years. She died on 22 December 2015, after a brief cancer illness at the Princess Alexandra Hospital in Brisbane at the age of 68.

== Filmography ==
=== Film ===
Year	Title	Role	Director	Type
1977	The Mango Tree	Maudie Plover	Kevin James Dobson	Feature film
1981	Bad Blood	Dorothy Graham	Mike Newell	Feature film
1982	Starstruck	Teacher	Gillian Armstrong	Feature film
1983	Dusty	Clara	John Richardson	Feature film
1984	Strikebound	Agnes Doig	Richard Lowenstein	Feature film
2002	Lolly Pops			Film short
2003	Gettin' Square	Parole Board Chairman	Jonathan Teplitzky	Feature film
2010	Girl Clock!	Ms Thompson	Jennifer Ussi	Feature film
2011	The Golden Plate	Gretta	Michael Gabel; Todd Shoemaker	Film short
2013	Tracks	Mrs. Ward	John Curran	Feature film
2013	The Turning (segment: "Small Mercies")	Marjorie Keenan	Rhys Graham	Feature film
2014	Drive Hard	Granny	Brian Trenchard-Smith	Feature film
2015	Bullets for the Dead	Miss Winnie	Michael Du-Shane	Feature film

=== Television ===
Year	Title	Role	Director
1977	Kirby's Company		TV series, 2 episodes
1977	Young Ramsay		TV series, 1 episode
1978	Pig In A Poke	Alex	TV series, episode 3: "Christina's Story"
1978	Loss of Innocence	Eleanor	Miniseries, 3 episodes
1978	Run From the Morning	Sylvia Blake	TV series, Season 1, 6 episodes
1979	Everyday	Guest (with Richard Moir)	TV series, 1 episode
1979	Prisoner	Franky Doyle	TV series, Season 1, 20 episodes
1979	The Franky Doyle Story	Franky Doyle	TV movie
1979	The Oracle		TV series, 1 episode
1979	The John Sullivan Story	Biljana	TV movie
1979	The Dolebludgers	Shirley	TV movie
1979	Lucinda Brayford	Julie Vane	Miniseries, 1 episode
1980	Australian Theatre Festival: Bedfellows		Teleplay
1980	The 22nd Annual TV Week Logie Awards	Herself	TV special
1981–84	Cop Shop	Joan Wright	TV series, 3 episodes
1983	The Dismissal	Cairns's Secretary	Miniseries, 1 episode
1983	Carson's Law	May Campbell	TV series, 3 episodes
1983	All the Rivers Run	Mrs. Slope	Miniseries, 2 episodes
1984	Eureka Stockade	Anastasia Hayes	Miniseries, 2 episodes
1985	Taggart	Molly Barron	TV series, Season 1, 1 episode
1986	Strike it Rich!	Stella Kingsley	TV series, Season 1, 3 episodes
1989	Hannay	Muriel Thorpe	TV series, Season 2, 1 episode
1989	The Bill	Doreen McKenzie	TV series, Season 5, 1 episode
1989	TV AM	Guest (with Fiona Spence & Val Lehman)	TV series, 1 episode
1990	The Great Escape	Herself	TV special
1992	Moon and Son	Lucy Gilbert	TV series, Season 1, 1 episode
1993–94	Casualty	Jean Hall	TV series, Season 7 & 8, 2 episodes
1993	Casualty	Paediatric Registrar	Season 8, 1 episode
1996	Fire	Counsellor	TV series, Season 2, 1 episode
1996	Flipper	Mes. Hillier	TV series, Season 1, 1 episode
1996	40 Years of TV Stars... Then and Now	Herself	TV special
1997	Where Are They Now?	Guest (with Gerard Maguire, Val Lehman, Lynda Stoner & Lynne Hamilton)	TV series, 1 episode
1998; 2000	Good Morning Australia	Guest	TV series, 2 episodes
1998	The Day of the Roses	Greta	Miniseries, 2 episodes
1998	Medivac	Mrs. Ryan	TV series, Season 3, 1 episodes
1998; 2001	Blue Heelers	Gladys Fraser	TV series, Season 5, 1 episode
1998	Misery Guts	Ticket Seller	TV series, Season 1, 1 episode
1999	Queen Kat, Carmel & St Jude	Nance McCaffery	Miniseries, 4 episodes
2000	The Love of Lionel's Life	Mavis	TV movie
2001	Blue Heelers	Eunice Johnson	TV series, Season 8, 1 episode
2003	(S)truth		Miniseries (3 shorts)
2004	Small Claims	Pamela	TV movie
2005	Small Claims: White Wedding	Pamela	TV movie
2006	Small Claims: The Reunion	Pamela	TV movie
2006	Where Are They Now?	Guest (with Amanda Muggleton, Peta Toppano & Val Lehman)	TV series, 1 episode
2009	Heartbeat	Mrs Pike	TV series, Season 18, 2 episodes
2011	A Current Affair	Guest (with Prisoner cast: Elspeth Ballantyne, Jane Clifton, Patsy King, Judith McGrath, Val Lehman & Margaret Laurence)	TV series, 1 episode
2012	The Strange Calls	Gwen	TV series, Season 1, 1 episode
2013	The Morning Show	Guest (with Prisoner cast: Fiona Spence, Patsy King, Val Lehman, Colette Mann & Elspeth Ballantyne)	TV series, 1 episode
2013	Reef Doctors	Mrs. Ogilvy	TV series, Season 1, 1 episode

== Awards, honours and nominations ==
Association	Year	Award	Work/s	Results
Logie Awards	Silver Logie - Best Lead Actress in a Series	1979	Prisoner (aka Prisoner: Cell Block H (USA/UK) and Caged Woman (Canada)	Won
Australian Film Institute	Best Actress in a Guest Role in a Television Drama Series	1994	Blue Heelers, Episode: "Deadly Fascination"	Nominated
Australian Film Institute	Best Actress in a Lead Role	1984	Strikebound	Nominated
Australian Film Institute	Best Actress in a Supporting Role	1977	The Mango Tree	Nominated
Queensland Actors Equity Award	Best Established Artist	2006		Honoured
Matilda Awards	Gold Matilda	2015 (posthumously)		Honoured
Actors' & Entertainers' Benevolent Fund	Alan Edwards Lifetime Achievement Award	2003		Honoured
