= Queensland Actors Equity Awards =

Queensland Actors Equity Awards are a peer awards which recognise excellence in all forms of theatre in Queensland.

The awards are voted by members of Actors Equity / Media, Entertainment and Arts Alliance (MEAA). All members of MEAA who have performed in Queensland are eligible to be nominated. The inaugural awards were given out at a ceremony at the Merthyr Bowls Club in December 2006 hosted by David Knijnenburg.

Year	Category	Name	Production	Notes
2006	Best Actor	Jean-Marc Russ	Queensland Theatre Company's Private Lives	
2006	Best Actress	Barbara Lowing	Queensland Theatre Company's Away	
2006	Best Supporting Actor	Anthony Standish	Queensland Theatre Company's Puss In Boots	
2006	Best Supporting Actress	Sue Dwyer	Queensland Theatre Company's Away	
2006	Best Ensemble Cast	Sue Dwyer, Leon Cain, Barbara Lowing, Joss McWilliam, Georgina Symes, Francesca Savige, Danny Murphy and Richard Sydenham	Queensland Theatre Company's Away	
2006	Best Emerging Artist	Anthony Standish		For Equity member in their first year of membership
2006	Best Established Artist	Carol Burns		Equity member who has been a consistent member for a long period of time

== See also ==
- Performing arts in Australia
