= Where Are They Now? (Australian TV program) =

Pop culture documentary show

- Presented by: Melissa Doyle; David Koch
- Country of origin: Australia

Production
- Running time: 60 minutes per episode (inc. commercials)

Original release
- Network: Seven Network
- Release: February 2006 – November 2008

Where Are They Now? is a television show that aired on Australia's Seven Network between 2006 and 2008. It was hosted by David Koch and Melissa Doyle, who at the time also hosted Seven's breakfast television program Sunrise. It is a revival of a previous show of the same name hosted by Peter Luck in 1997.

== Premise ==
The program looks back at particular periods in recent history with a specific slant towards major events and popular culture, with a focus on Australian life at the time. Along with edited segments, each show features studio interviews with noted figures and celebrities who have seemingly ended their 15 minutes of fame and gone into obscurity, leading the presenters to ask them the question, "where are they now?".

Cast reunions such as bringing together and reuniting the cast of serial Sons and Daughters and the original Fletcher family from the soap opera Home and Away were also common segments on the show. The musical groups Girlfriend and Uncanny X-Men also reunited for the show.

Numerous episodes also revisited guests and stories previously featured on Peter Luck's 1997 version.

== Broadcast ==
Where Are They Now? debuted on Sunday night at 6:30pm in February 2006 to high ratings. The show went on hiatus from June to early August 2006 to make way for the celebrity singing competition It Takes Two, but returned to the same time slot after the finale of that series.

Where Are They Now? returned for a second series in May 2007, and a one-off episode aired on 16 November 2008.
