= List of Prisoner cast members =

The following is a list of Prisoner cast members, ordered by number of episodes they appeared in. This list contains actors from the Australian television series Prisoner.

== List of Prisoner cast ==
The following list includes actors who were regular credited cast members that appeared in 20 or more episodes of the series.

Actor	Character	No. of episodes
Elspeth Ballantyne	Meg Jackson/Morris	669
Fiona Spence	Vera Bennett	222
Patsy King	Governor Erica Davidson	351
Carol Burns	"Franky" (Freida) Doyle	20
Val Lehman	Bea "Queen Bea" Smith	375
Sheila Florance	Lizzie Birdsworth	403
Colette Mann	Doreen Anderson/Burns	286
Peta Toppano	Karen Travers	79
Kerry Armstrong	Lynn "Wonky" Warner	44
Mary Ward	Jeanette "Mum" Brooks	33
Barry Quin	Dr. Greg Miller	85
Amanda Muggleton	Chrissie Latham	107
Terry Gill	Det. Insp. Jack Grace	53
Christine Amor	Jean Vernon (social worker)	29
Lesley Baker	Monica "Monnie" Ferguson (Note: Baker also played Belle 'Tinker' Peters eps 390-392.)	36
James Smillie	Steve Wilson	27
Bryon Williams	Dr. Weissman	27
Joy Westmore	Officer Joyce Barry/Pringle	254
Penny Stewart	Kathleen Leach	28
Jude Kuring	Noeline Burke	27
Gerard Maguire	Jim "Fletch the Letch" Fletcher	208
Judith McGrath	Colleen "Po-Face" Powell	263
Reylene Pearce	Phyllis Hunt	137
Ian Smith	Ted Douglas (Note: Ian Smith worked as Associate Producer/Scriptwriter during the show's run. On screen, he also appeared as Pixie Mason's Father in ep. 502.)	51
Sigrid Thornton	Roslyn Coulson	30
Monica Maughan	Pat O'Connell	40
George Mallaby	Paul Reid	43
Ian Gilmour	Kevin Burns	22
Rosalind Speirs	Caroline Simpson	26
Margot Knight	Sharon Gilmour	27
Betty Bobbitt	Judy Bryant	429
Jane Clifton	Margo Gaffney (Note: Clifton also played Yvonne in ep.9.)Alan Slevin	107
Jentah Sobott	Heather "Mouse" Trapp (Note: Sobott's character recurring, before becoming a regular)	57
Caroline Gillmer	Helen Smart	77
Sue Devine	Tracey Morris	21
Belinda Davey	Hazel Kent	63
Anthony Hawkins	Bob Morris	34
Maureen Edwards	Officer Sue Bailey (Note: Edwards played 4 roles in total in the series)	28
Anne Phelan	Myra Desmond (Note: Phelan previously appeared as prison officer Manson in episode 17, and as dimwitted prisoner Bernadette in episodes 94 and 95.)	124
Alan Hopgood	Wally Wallace	75
Serge Lazareff	David Andrews	24
Maggie Millar	Marie Winter	39
Brian Hannan	Terry Harrison	25
Kate Sheil	Janet Conway	43
Olivia Hamnett	Kate Peterson	39
Louise Le Nay	Sandy Edwards	30
Wayne Jarratt	Steve Faulkner	71
Jacqui Gordon	Susie Driscoll	43
Anne Lucas	Faye Quin	22
Maggie Kirkpatrick	Joan "The Freak" Ferguson	389
Lisa Crittenden	Maxine Daniels	91
Susan Guerin	Barbara "Barbie" Fields	26
Anna Hruby	Paddy Lawson	37
Alan David Lee	Tony Berman	21
Carole Skinner	Nola McKenzie	40
Gerda Nicolson	Governor Ann Reynolds	317
Wanda Davidson	Frances Harvey	42
Judy McBurney	Sandra "Pixie" Mason	96
Tim Elston	Scott Collins	32
Penny Maegraith	Petra Roberts	25
Tina Bursill	Sonia Stevens	54
Babs McMillan	Cass Parker	60
Maxine Klibingaitis	Bobbie Mitchell	108
Wendy Playfair	Minnie Donovan	33
Andy Anderson	Rick Manning	38
Janet Andrewartha	Rebecca "Reb" Kean	94
Brian James	Stan Dobson	22
Lois Collinder	Alice "Lurch" Jenkins	168
Kim Trengove	Rachel Millsom	22
Louise Siversen	Lou Kelly	140
Nigel Bradshaw	Officer Dennis Cruckshank	75
Genevieve Lemon	Marlene "Rabbit" Warren	74
Victoria Nicholls	Heather Rodgers	23
Alethea McGrath	Dot Farrar	25
Robert Summers	Shane Munroe	26
Dorothy Cutts	Officer Pat Slattery	76
Steve Kuhn	Philip Cleary	22
Robyn Gibbes	Sam Greenway	24
Peter Bensley	Matt Delaney	34
Leslie Dayman	Geoff Macrae	34
Trevor Kent	Frank Burke	33
Pepe Trevor	Lexie Patterson	139
Lois Ramsey	Ettie Parslow	46
Ernie Bourne	Mervin Pringle (Note: Bourne also appeared as a doctor in ep. 22, and as Doreen's penpal earlier in episodes 192 to 194.)	76
Sonja Tallis	Nora Flynn	51
Billie Hammerberg	May Collins	51
Kirsty Child	Willie Beecham	52
Jackie Woodburne	Julie "Chook" Egbert	87
Debra Lawrance	Daphne Graham	52
Christine Harris	Pippa Reynolds	34
Margot Knight	Sharon Gilmour (episodes 90 to 116); Terri Malone (episodes 540 to 576)	64 (Note: Reflects total number of episodes Knight appeared in as both Sharon and Terri.)
Jenny Lovell	Jenny Hartley	44
James Condon	James Dwyer	23
Kevin Summers	Ben Fulbright	21
Lynda Stoner	Eve Wilder	26
Glenda Linscott	Rita "The Beater" Connors	106
Julia Blake	Nancy McCormack (Note: Julia Blake's third role (episodes 589 to 650); she originally appeared as homeopathic prisoner Evelyn Randel in episodes 175 to 179, and as Alice Dodds, who replaced Judy Bryant at the halfway house in episodes 404 to 407.)	61
Pat Evison	Jessie Windom	28
Sean Scully	Dan Moulton	25
Peter Hayes	Steve Ryan	32
Linda Hartley	Rachel "Roach" Waters	27
Peter Adams	(Acting Governor) Bob Moran	26
Christine Earle	Janet Williams	32
Kate Hood	Kath Maxwell	79
Rebecca Dines	Vicki McPherson	57
Paula Duncan	Lorelei "Snook" Wilkinson	54
Rosanne Hull-Brown	Merle "Looney" Jones	64
Michael Winchester	Marty Jackson (Note: Winchester was the third actor to play the role after Ronald Korosy and Andrew McKaige.)	59
Philip Hyde	Rodney Adams	58
Desiree Smith	Delia Stout	42
Taya Straton	Rose "Spider" Simpson	38
Terrie Waddell	Lisa Mullins (Note: Waddell was the second actor to play this role after Nicki Paull, who left the series after six episodes due to illness (episodes 651 to 656).)	32
Sheryl Munks	Michelle "Brumby" Tucker	26
Victoria Rowland	Margaret "Spike" Marsh	27
Anne Charleston	Jeanette (Mum) Brooks daughter Lorraine Brooks, policewoman, Rebecca "(Reb)" Kean's mother	20

== See also ==
- List of Prisoner characters – prison staff
- List of Prisoner characters – inmates
- List of Prisoner characters - miscellaneous
