= List of Prisoner characters – prison staff =

This is a list of characters in the Australian television series Prisoner, that includes the "prison staff", the series was produced by (the) Reg Grundy Organisation and ran on Network Ten from 1979 until 1986 and was known internationally as Prisoner: Cell Block H in the United States and Britain, and Caged Women in Canada. Listed in order of appearance:

== Characters ==
- Erica Davidson (née Marne) (Patsy King – episodes 1–360), the prison's governor. Davidson was a former barrister (her father and brother were both judges) with political connections and notable events during her Governorship were the arrival of her niece on drug charges, her doomed romance with corrupt businessman Andrew Reynolds, and her kidnapping at the request of inmate Andrea Hennessey. A few months after her resignation she returned – working for the department itself – and was highly instrumental in investigating and eventually stopping the first cold regime of temporary governor, Joan Ferguson. In episode 491, we hear Erica has resigned from the department to pursue a career in Canberra.
- Vera Bennett – "Vinegar Tits" (Fiona Spence – episodes 1–224), First seen chasing after Sally Lee down the corridor with Meg Jackson. The acid-tongued senior prison officer aged and embittered beyond her years by caring for her demanding invalid mother. She believed that Erica's and Meg's progressive methods were wrong, and that the prisoners needed discipline and authority. Her stern attitude earned her the nickname "Vinegar Tits". Despite their differences, Vera counted Meg as perhaps her only friend. Although she was rude and harsh, she was not cold like her successor Joan Ferguson. She left after a failed romance with officer Terry Harrison to become Governor of Barnhurst prison, and she was referred to in later years – it is clear that she made an excellent job as Governor of Barnhurst, as she still holds this position in the final year of the series. (She is mentioned after The Fire and Riot at Barnhurst, which marks the end of an era; Bea Smith's death.)
- Meg Jackson (née Coppin, Morris) (Elspeth Ballantyne – episodes 1–692), born as Margaret Coppin, is one of the prison's senior officers. Born in a prison herself, Jackson was often sympathetic to inmate needs, hoping to rehabilitate the prisoners, though she was no pushover. Despite their vast differences in prison ideology, she and Vera Bennett were friends. The departures of inmates Bea Smith in September 1983 and Lizzie Birdsworth in February 1984 left Meg as the show's only remaining original cast member. Meg continued until the end of the series, making her the only original character to last the entire run. Meg had a heated rivalry with cold guard Joan "The Freak" Ferguson, which stemmed from Meg's stint in Wentworth as a prisoner: Meg's brief stint inside for contempt of court had confirmed her suspicions about The Freak's coldness. Meg had many failed romances. Meg was also friendly with fellow guards Colleen Powell, Joyce Barry and Dennis Cruickshank – to whom she became engaged. With exceptions, Meg became deputy governor after Colleen left Wentworth until the end of the series, having originally turned down the post when offered in order to save her marriage. In the final season, Meg was joined by her son, Officer Marty Jackson, who shared his mother's compassion towards the prisoners. Meg also enjoyed a close relationship with aged inmate, Ettie Parslow (Lois Ramsay) after it was discovered that the old dear had nursed her when she was a prison baby. Meg's first husband was killed by Chrissie Latham in a riot and she later married and divorced Bob Morris, the father of an inmate. And Meg was also a prisoner herself in Episode 309. In Episode 522, when it is revealed that prisoner Ettie Parslow nursed Meg as a baby at Barnhurst where Meg was born, Meg's birth name is revealed to be Margaret Coppin.
- Dr. Greg Miller (Barry Quin – episodes 1–110), handsome young prison doctor who had had a relationship with inmate Karen Travers years before she was imprisoned at Wentworth, and finds himself reunited with her when she arrives as a new prisoner in the first episode. During Karen's two-year sentence (less than one year screen time!), the pair become closer, and more distant, at various points. He goes on to have a brief romantic relationship with Meg Jackson, until they eventually agree to just remain close friends. Although his patience is sometimes tested by the prisoners' various escapades (especially by Lizzie often using her heart complaint to steal surgical alcohol or similar such capers), Greg is popular with the prisoners, many of whom treat him as a confidant. Later in the 1979 season, Greg leaves Wentworth to open up his own practice, but with no doctor serving Wentworth and the women near rioting point as a result, he agrees to return there to work on a part-time basis (though, storyline-wise, seems to spend all of his time there and very little at his surgery). When Karen is released near the end of the 1979 season, and ends up running the Halfway House for ex-prisoners, the pair rekindle their romantic relationship, and Greg finally asks Karen to marry him. However, Pat O'Connell's escaped convict son David mistakenly blames Greg for tipping the police off about him going to visit his mother, and plans to shoot Greg; but mistakenly shoots Karen instead. With Karen narrowly escaping death, the pair plan to leave for Queensland, for Karen to recover and Greg to open a new practice there. Greg's last regular appearance comes in episode 86 when he leaves his job at Wentworth; he returns briefly in episodes 107–110 to give evidence at Pat's appeal, during which we hear that Karen and himself have finally married.
- Anne Yates (Kirsty Child – episodes 1-29), a cold officer who does favours for the prisoners in exchange for cash. Is forced to resign after being caught selling contraceptives to Marilyn Mason. A while later, she strikes up a friendship with a lonely Vera on the outside, after a (supposedly) chance meeting in a bar. She subsequently introduces Vera to George Lucas, who turns out to be an underworld kingpin, and whom Vera becomes romantically involved with. When Vera finds that Anne is involved with illegal activities, she breaks off contact, but finds it hard to leave Lucas. When Anne is admitted to Wentworth as a prisoner in on drug charges, she tries to use her influence over Vera to ensure an easy stay. Despised by the other prisoners, both due to her being a former officer, and especially by Bea, who hates drug pushers, she hides from them in a laundry dryer, and dies of suffocation after Vera slams the door shut not realising Yates was hiding inside. Vera later realises that she was the cause of Yates's suffocation, but keeps it to herself. Yates is the officer that can be seen in the end credits sequence doing lock up in the first three episodes.
- Bill Jackson (Don Barker – episodes 2–4), Social Worker who was married to Officer Meg Jackson. Chrissie Latham stabs him with a pair of scissors that only electrician Eddie Cook saw. the women forced him to tell him and it is much to Meg's disgust when the woman use scissors for Chrissie to confess. a few episodes later Franky mentions his death and Doreen replies "oh that wasn't nice. Mr Jackson was a nice man" which proves like his wife he wasn't a push over
- Jean Vernon (Christine Amor – episodes 14–56), a young, idealistic social worker appointed welfare officer at Wentworth. Although well-meaning, she often lets her trust in prisoners get the better of her, putting her in several awkward situations. Notable for driving a white Volkswagen Beetle. The character arrives in episode 14, and gets off to a bad start with Meg, as Jean is effectively taking the place of Meg's murdered husband Bill. However, the pair soon strike up a better relationship, and by episode 20 Jean has moved in with Meg. Jean disappears around episode 33, with mention of how she has taken another position elsewhere; however, the character suddenly reappears in episode 47, working back at Wentworth will no explanation given. During this second stint, Jean (moving back in with Meg) convinces Meg to let Nolene Burke's wayward daughter Leanne move in with them, to try and set her on the straight and narrow; despite Leanne's troublesome behaviour, Jean continually convinces Meg to give her "one more chance". When Leanne is finally arrested for being part of a hold up in episode 56, Jean is then seen moving out of Meg's apartment once again and is gone from the series for good. She's mentioned again in Episode 85 when new social worker Paul Reid comes in to replace her. She's brought up again in Episode 120 when Leanne Burke arrives at Wentworth with a charge of petty larceny and in Episode 124 during a discussion between Paul Reid and Nolene Burke who discuss charity offered to Nolene's mother she refuses to take. When Paul Reid explains to Nolene that he's only trying to help her after Nolene tells him how her family doesn't take charity from anyone, Nolene feels they cause nothing but trouble as she despises Jean for helping Leanne she feels led up to her death at the end of Episode 121 after she's taken to Wentworth.
- Paddy Maguire (Jean Cain – episodes 15–149), Older member of staff who had minor speaking roles in first two series.
- Joyce Edith Barry (later Pringle) (Joy Westmore – episodes 29-692), usually friendly, competent but occasionally a little dim-witted officer who eventually marries the prison chef Mervin Pringle (Ernie Bourne). Possibly best remembered for her kidnap at the hands of Lou Kelly, the brutal bashing at the hands of femme fatale Eve Wilder and her comic moments including her tap dancing classes and her ineptitude. Lou threatened and attacked Joyce whilst she was serving a brief stint as acting governor. She was one of the guards who was trapped in the Rec. room during the infamous Ballinger siege, where she tried to hold things together, but after it was over, she fell apart. Despite her occasional lapses of ineptitude and the fact that she felt ineffective, she cared a lot about the prisoners, although at times she could be firm. She was seen at her best in ep.498 when she was briefly acting Governor during Ann Reynold's kidnapping, standing up to Joan Ferguson with courage and receiving the full support of officer Len Murphy.
- Matthew James "Jim" Fletcher – "Fletch the Letch" (Gerard Maguire – episodes 40-256), the prison's male deputy governor, a stern but generally fair, authoritarian army man who had a tendency to fall in love with some of his more attractive charges, which ensured his nickname – "Fletch the Letch" (given to him by Bea on his very first day!) – stuck. He has been traumatised by killing an unarmed nine-year-old girl in Vietnam (a fact he only reveals to the doctor) and the women take advantage of his resulting haemophobia, until he overcomes it. He later resigned to become Governor of Beechmont. He separates from his wife and begins an affair with a remand prisoner who he helped attain bail, but when his wife and two sons come to visit him at a motel where he is living – his enemies (ex soldier Geoff Butler and the husband of one of his girlfriend – brought together by their common hate against Jim Fletcher) plot to kill him by placing a bomb package outside his room. However, one of Fletcher's children opens the bomb-package intended for him, which results in his entire family being killed, but Jim survives without physical damages. Note: When he is in court in episode 150, Jim's full name is given as Matthew James Fletcher.
- Colleen Powell – "PoFace" (Judith McGrath – episodes 48-456), a senior prison officer who rose to prominence after Vera Bennett's departure and was deputy governor for much of Ann Reynolds' administration. Initially making recurring appearances, she was depicted as firm but fair officer, but following the departure of Vera Bennett in 1981, she became a very arrogant and sarcastic officer and militant Union steward, making her unpopular with the inmates and causing some tension among her colleagues, for instance treating inmate Alison Paige dreadfully for simply pushing her and later warring with Meg Morris over the position of deputy governor. Following the arrival of nice, young prisoner Susie Driscoll (Jacqui Gordon) followed by the arrival of much nastier and cold officer Joan Ferguson, Colleen gradually loosened up and reverted to her firm but fair routine. She also eased her relationships with the rest of her colleagues, particularly Meg with whom she became a good friend. However, Colleen's dry, sarcastic sense of humour remained which led the inmates to nickname her "Po-Face." Colleen was left devastated when her husband Patrick and children Jennifer and Robert were killed by a car bomb intended for Rick Manning. This was the last straw for Colleen and she decided she wanted rid of Wentworth forever, so she resigned. Her position of deputy governor was taken over by Meg Morris. On her last day, Judy, Pixie, Myra, Cass and Bobbie give her a memorable goodbye and good luck in the laundry where Pixie gives her a peck on the cheek. In her last memorable scene, she looks back smiling at Wentworth one last time before stepping forward to face a new life.
- Paul Reid (George Mallaby – episodes 85–130), a liberal social worker, who arrives to replace Jean Vernon in episode 85. Initially Paul is rather aloof and very set in his ways, but this soon gives away to a more easy going and likeable persona. He is notable for smoking a pipe in early appearances. A single parent after his wife died, he also has problems at home due to his generally well-meaning but wayward son Tony (John Higginson), who drops out of university and gets in with a group of dope-smoking drop-outs. Their supplier is Sharon Gilmour, who once inside, tries to blackmail Paul over his son, but Paul quickly puts an end to her efforts. Tony is given a good behaviour bond but this is revoked when he gets into a pub brawl trying to protect one of his pregnant friends from the group of drop-outs and is given a sentence to work on a prison farm. In his job at Wentworth, Paul is generally well respected by the women, but won't be taken for a fool. He is particularly key in championing Bea Smith, whom he believes can do much better if given a fair chance. Paul also becomes good friends with Meg, and, amongst other things, helps her in the case over Gail Summers and her abused children. Tony returns in episode 128 and, with a more mature attitude, starts seeking employment, but Paul suddenly vanishes from the series in episode 130, in the middle of both Tony's storyline, and that of Gail. In episode 132, we hear of his abruptly leaving for Adelaide to run a garage with Tony. Note: George Mallaby was forced to abruptly leave the series due to ill health, forcing several of his storylines, which were mid-course, to hastily be reworked and resolved. Mallaby had already written episodes for the series, and continued to do so after his on-screen departure.
- Jock Stewart (Tommy Dysart – episodes 114–258), a sinister, vicious officer who bullies the women. Murdered Sharon Gilmour sparking a long running storyline where Judy Bryant strives for revenge. He later tries to attack Judy 'again' but he falls down a flight of stairs and is paralysed.
- Agnes Forster (Lois Ramsay – episodes 135–140), an aged and rather "eccentric", erratic social worker brought in to replace Paul Reid, who seems more interested in her cat Butchie (which she brings in with her each day) and drinking tea than actually doing any work. She spends little time at the prison and shows little interest in the prisoners and their cases. This soon irks both the staff and prisoners, as she forgets or loses important information, leading to several upsets over arrangements she is supposed to make for inmates, such as losing a letter that would have allowed Lizzie Birdsworth to visit her ailing granddaughter about to go in for an important operation. Vera is against social workers anyway, but even the easy going Meg finds her patience tested by Agnes's erratic work practice. The only one who begins to bond with her is Jim Fletcher, after she tells him of some of the successful cases she worked on when she was in her prime. But as the women start to veto Agnes, Erica tries to convince Ted Douglas to replace her; Douglas tries to change her mind, telling her that Agnes only has a few months left before retiring. Things finally come to a head over the handling of raped Doreen, with Agnes's disgust and interfering that Doreen wants to abort the baby setting off a chain of events that sees Doreen trying to commit suicide. As Erica is about to convince the department to replace Agnes, Agnes – bemused by the claims about her poor work, feeling that the officers have been teaming up against her – resigns.
- Mrs O'Reagan (Christine Calcutt – episodes 135–469), the much put-upon cook at Wentworth. After she is scalded with hot fat by Dot (469), she retires from the series, to be replaced by Ray Proctor.
- Stuart Gillespie (Wynn Roberts – episodes 160–168), a stern departmental overseer who comes to inspect the running of the prison and its security measures, following a number of incidents and escape attempts. His officious attitude and the harsh regimes he introduces antagonise both inmates, and most of the staff. It is his aggressive attitude that is one of the main reasons a bunch of the prisoners make an escape attempt through long-forgotten tunnels running from the prison garden. The escaped Judy makes a videotaped televised statement citing Gillespie as the main reason behind the escape, but is frustrated that his actual name is censored on the broadcast. Governor Davidson too is unhappy with Gillespie's work ethics, and the many complaints she receives about his regimes from her officers (bar Vera), and complains to the department. The women come up with a plot to force Gillespie's resignation – they deliberately let him overhear the planning of a letter by Lizzie, including some trumped up claims, about Gillespie, to the Ombudsman. Gillespie intercepts the letter and opens it, breaking the law, just as Ted Douglas arrives from the department and catches him doing so, forcing Gillespie to resign.
- Sid Humphries (Edward Hepple – episodes 169–226), an elderly man who works as a part-time handyman at Wentworth and develops a romantic attachment with inmate Lizzie Birdsworth, but later dies.
- David Andrews (Serge Lazareff – episodes 171-194 (seen in opening recap of 195)), an idealistic young prison teacher, who has previous been working with troubled youths, who Erica arranges to come to the prison to run classes to try to improve the women's education and give them a better chance on the outside when they are released. Initially he turns to Vera for advice as to handle the women, until he realises that hers might not be the best way to treat the prisoners. Vera also develops a quiet crush on David, and invites him to dinner, but quickly calls it off when she learns that he has a girlfriend. The classes initially meet with a lukewarm reception, with Bea and many of the women feeling that he is preaching to them, but Doreen develops a crush on David, and makes an advance on him just as Officer Fletcher enters the room. Erica eventually agrees that the wrongdoing was on Doreen's part, and the classes continue; Erica herself joins in, to learn pottery, until a clay fight breaks out between the women, ruining Erica's work and sending her storming out. David is also key in picking up on Georgie Baxter's hearing problems, which have held her back all of her life; after Georgie's ears are operated on, he begins trying to teach her to read and write. However, the women have several run-ins with David, including when he puts in a recommendation for Georgie to not yet be released (so that he have time to better educate her), leading to an often frosty working relationship between the prisoners and David and several times boycott the education scheme. However, at other times, David acts as a liaison between the woman and the officers, and later on in his stint at the prison becomes an unofficial confidant of Bea's regarding prison regulations. But when David tries to arrange for Bea to be the first prisoner to learn how to prepare braille books for the blind, the necessity of extra officers to stand guard on the proposed new work scheme annoys Vera, who in turn goes to Colleen Powell, who complains to the Union about the extra work. After Powell overhears David quietly advise Bea that the woman have the right to go on strike in the laundry, she insists that he is a security risk working in the prison, forcing David to resign. Despite a sometimes frosty working relationship, Bea and Lizzie are sorry to see him go, believing by the end that his intentions were to help the prisoners.
- Sally Dean (Debra Lawrance – episodes 184–186), a young trainee officer who is lacking confidence and unsure how to conduct herself around the prisoners. Despite words of advice from other officers to find her own way of dealing with the women, Sally continually listens to Vera's harsh treatment of the prisoners, with Vera adoring the new felt sense of authority and influence over a younger officer. But Sally's attitude quickly gets the women's back up. When Sally overhears a plan for the illiterate Georgie Baxter to memorise a page of a book to try and prove she can read in order to help her release, she exposes it, antagonising the women even further. In retaliation, the women trick her into overhearing a false conversation about drugs being hidden inside some pottery works made in David Andrews' classroom, leading her to enter the room and smash all of the works apart. Erica is furious at the behaviour, but gives Sally another chance, again insisting that Sally must find her own suited way of dealing with the women. But further run-ins with the women over her mock strict attitude to make Sally realise that she is not suited to the job, and hands in her resignation. A parting word from Judy, who is mopping a corridor, tells her that the women would have treated her fairly if only she had shown them a little dignity.
- Terry Harrison (Brian Hannan – episodes 199–223), a male officer and old friend of Jim Fletcher's who is transferred to Wentworth and becomes romantically involved with Vera Bennett. He is also the past ex-husband of prisoner Kathy Hall who arrives at Wentworth in episode 213 along with Dinah Walford. When she receives harmful threats and is bashed, he confronts Kathy about who would have attacked her. He finds out about Dinah who was already out on parole in episode 215 to which the harsh threats on Kathy have ironically stopped. In episode 216, Harrison confronts Walford after looking for her on the street who denies knowing anything about the attack. After visiting her male friend, a pimp, he is later beaten up by more of his friends. As it later turns out, Dinah was responsible for the threats and the attack on Kathy to keep her silent about illegal business going on in a pawn shop she went to one night and witnessed involving Dinah and her friends. Going to the pawn shop to look for answers for Kathy, he threatens the manager who calls in a guy named Harry Bailey who arrives at Vera's apartment with a gun after she comes home and attacks her, looking for Terry. Terry arrives only to be caught in the matter, saved in time by Jim Fletcher who arrives and knocks Bailey unconscious from behind. Involving himself in trouble, this puts an effect on him and Vera's planned marriage to which Vera throws him out of her apartment. He later creates a set up to have Kathy killed on the day of her release from Wentworth as revenge for their troubled relationship, to which she is immediately in a hit-and-run right outside the building in episode 220. In episode 223, Dinah and some of her gangster friends kidnap Terry to have him work for them or else they'll harm Vera. While trying to work out his relationship with Vera, he informs her on Kathy's death which leads to her telling Inspector Grace, who knew Harrison was behind it all along. To her surprise, Grace decides not to do anything as he has other plans for Harrison. He is seen talking to Grace outside the prison by one of Dinah's friends who look at the conversation the wrong way. Like Kathy, he too is killed in a hit-and-run as he is shot from behind by a road just outside Wentworth while trying to reconcile with Vera once more.
- Janet Conway (Kate Sheil – episodes 232–274), a newly trained officer who had previously spent time in Wentworth as a remand prisoner twelve years before. She dates Jim Fletcher, but begins obsessively stalking him after he ends the relationship. She later leaves the prison with new love Ian Mahoney.
- Steve Faulkner (Wayne Jarratt – episodes 245–316), handsome male officer, who had an affair with prisoner Sandy Edwards after being caught inside the prison during a riot. Often seen by the women as a 'good sort' as he often takes any chance to stand up for all signs of injustice. His attempt to bring about the downfall of Joan Ferguson leads to his resignation.
- Ian Mahoney (Peter Curtin – episodes 257–274), brought in to help the inmates with a printing press project. After a brief flirtation with Meg, he becomes romantically involved with Janet Conway and they both eventually leave Wentworth to become married.
- Joan "The Freak" Ferguson (Maggie Kirkpatrick – episodes 287–692), a sinister and cold lesbian prison officer known to the prisoners as "the Freak". Infamous for the body searches she carried out using her trademark black leather gloves. She was pitched as the coldest, most evil and most villainous guard at Wentworth, contrasted sharply by her arch-rival in senior guard, Meg Morris (Jackson). Meg saw Joan as she always had thought she was, when Meg was herself a prisoner. Ferguson also had an ongoing rivalry with ex prison governor Erica Davidson. Joan spent two long stints as Acting Governor – both times she implemented a severe regime that alienated herself from both prisoners and officers alike. Joan became a major character and further episodes began to focus on her personal life such as her relationship with her father, a runaway boy she attempted to adopt and even a failed romance. It was as a villainous prison guard however that "the Freak" was most appreciated, and the majority of her time in the show involved unsuccessful attempts to kill, expose or fire her. She also had a tendency to antagonize her fellow guards, such as when she and Meg battled for the post of deputy governor, which Meg won. In a similar vein she antagonized Meg's predecessor as deputy, Colleen Powell, and a further memorable scene involved being soundly slapped in the face by fellow guard Joyce Barry after she insulted her fiancé, Mervin Pringle. Ferguson's private life contrasted with her sinister nature while on the job and she seemed to have a heart for children and dogs outside the prison and in addition, she cared deeply for her father. Still, her coldness inside the prison never wavered, such as when one prisoner had a baby and Joan sarcastically and provocatively commented to other prisoners, "sweet little thing isn't it ... be a shame if someone had an accident near it with boiling water". Joan was arrested in the last episode in a sting organised by dying inmate Rita Connors as she attempted to retrieve a hidden stash of illicit cash she'd gained wind of in the prison. It was all a set up. The final scene of the series was Joan's transfer to a prison in Western Australia.
- Andrea Radcliffe (Marion Dimmick – episodes 266–690) A senior officer who had minor speaking roles, through the series.
- Neil Murray (Adrian Wright – episodes 305–321), a male nurse who takes over medical duties at Wentworth and develops an uncaring attachment to inmate Chrissie Latham. He is shown to have dislikes towards prostitutes like Joan Ferguson. During Murray's time there, two prisoners, Penny Seymour and Tina Gibson (both prostitutes) who are released from Wentworth, are both found dead in an alley on separate nights. The culprit behind the attacks are shown to be a person wearing black gloves. The culprit seemingly appear to be Ferguson at first due to black gloves she has and can be seen wearing. Murray however turns out to be responsible for the murders when Steve Faulkner finds a black glove in his office. After finding out by Meg that Chrissie was a prostitute, Murray arranges her escape by sending her to hospital for tests in episode 315, but he then kidnaps her and she realizes she has got out of her depth. He is later wounded by the police and sent to Woodridge prison where Chrissie has to confront him again when the women go there for the charity concert rehearsals. When he attacks Chrissie once more there, he is declared insane and shipped off to a mental hospital.
- Barry Simmons (Ken James – episodes 337–338), the first new social worker of Wentworth succeeding Agnes Foster after nearly 200 episodes. He is good friends with Meg Morris and is shown to be polite towards the women. When the women lose buy up privileges, Simmons sneaks in a packet of cigarettes to prisoner Paddy Lawson. When Lawson gets caught with them by Joan Ferguson, Ferguson immediately suspects Simmons had slipped them in that day since he was the only visitor. Meg Morris responsible for not giving him a body search which leads to her temporary resignation. Simmons received the shortest stint from any social worker character on the show. By episode 339 the character is written out and his absence is referred to by Erica Davidson who states that he "wasn't working out" as she had hoped.
- John Maxwell (Lachlan McDonald – episodes 356–357), a young prison teacher, who Erica arranges to work at Wentworth to help prisoner Dianne Henley who cannot read. This is the first time in over 150 episodes that there has been a teacher at Wentworth since the departure of David Andrews. Like Andrews, Maxwell's purpose is to try to improve the women's education and give them a better chance on the outside when they are released. He is seen working with other women as well. Unlike Andrews however, Maxwell's stay at Wentworth is extremely brief and did not expand into a much longer storyline.
- Ann "Reyno" Reynolds (Gerda Nicolson – episodes 364–692), who replaced Erica Davidson as governor of the prison. A former social worker, she was a progressive governor, who believed in rehabilitation. She had a rival in Joan Ferguson, who was acting governor in her absence, and she instituted two severe regimes, which angered both prisoners and staff, one of which was stopped by Ann's predecessor, Erica Davidson. Ann suffered breast cancer during her run as governor, failed romances with the eremite Wally Wallace and biker Dan Moulton and kidnap and persecution at the hands of an angry relative of an ex-prisoner that led to the famous Episode 500 cliffhanger.
- Dr. Scott Collins (Tim Elston – episodes 383–418), a new handsome prison doctor who is secretly in love with prisoner Petra Roberts. During his last appearances at Wentworth he had his suspicions about cold officer David Bridges.
- David Bridges (David Waters – episodes 408–417), a male officer who is sensitive to the women's problems to the point that he begins to systematically "set them free" with the prisoners assuming that he is helping them to escape. His intentions are rather more sinister, as the elderly Lizzie Birdsworth discovers in an end-of-season cliffhanger episode... Cass later beheads him. It turns out that Bridges isn't David's last name, but the name of his first victim.
- Rick Manning (Andy Anderson – episodes 421–458), a tough male officer who had previously been in the police force. Eddie Stevens' gang hunted him down and attempted to kill him and wound up killing the family of Rick's colleague Colleen Powell in the process. He later fell in love with the young Rachel Milsom but the relationship ended after Rachel was imprisoned for running down the man who killed her father. He left Wentworth to work as a juvenile crime counsellor.
- Stanley "Stan The Man" Dobson (Brian James – episodes 425–513), an elderly prison officer who worked at Wentworth before his retirement. Bobbie would always refer to him as "Stan the Man". Stan later returned to Wentworth as a general handyman, but shortly afterwards suffered a heart attack, after his recovery Stan and his wife Edie apply for prisoner Bobbie Mitchell to come and live with them and visit Wentworth to speak to Ann before the parole hearing.
- Jonathan Edmonds (Bryan Marshall – episodes 448–455), a psychologist granted permission to conduct research at Wentworth, whose activities take a sinister turn when they involve experiments in mind control through hypnosis.
- Dennis Cruickshank – "The Yorkshire Pud" (Nigel Bradshaw – episodes 457–560), a Yorkshireman who had worked in borstals in England before arriving at Wentworth as an officer, falling in love with fellow officer Heather Rodgers. He was suspended for breaking a strike and returned to England with his wife, leaving Rodgers, but later came back to Wentworth and became engaged to Meg Morris. He was tracked down by prisoner Frank Burke, and shot, leaving him paralysed. He left Meg and left the series shortly after. He was mentioned a couple of times after his departure. Last mentioned in 590 where Meg mentions he doesn't write as much any more.
- Heather Rodgers (Victoria Nicholls – episodes 461–484), a well-meaning but naive "rookie" officer straight out of training school and a former school friend of prisoner Marlene Warren. She had a brief romance with officer Dennis Cruickshank but it fizzled out after Dennis' suspension for breaking a strike. She was also involved in an attempt to expose Joan Ferguson and get her dismissed which initially succeeded until the strike was called. Shortly after, she was sacked by Ann Reynolds and left the prison after another scheme she took part in to expose Ferguson completely backfired. She is mentioned again when Dennis returns, saying that her mother doesn't even know where she is.
- Raymond "Auntie Ray" Proctor (Alex Menglet – episodes 471–506), succeeded Mrs. O'Reagan as the prison's cook/chef and was one of the few openly gay, male characters. He was not seen after episode 506 but was referred to through to episode 521 when it was revealed he had been sacked.
- Patricia "Pat" Slattery (Dorothy Cutts – episodes 473–690), sarcastic recurring officer. She is accused of fixing the books at Wentworth and is suspended from duty, however Ann Reynolds realises the scam had been going on for years before Pat started. She is re-instated when it is realised the true culprit was 'Head Of The Department', Geoffrey Chaucer.
- Phil Cleary (Steve Kuhn – episodes 475–498), an American social worker who is introduced during prison strike, and knows prisoner Bobbie Mitchell. He also tries to have a relationship with Meg Morris who rejects him. He is shot by Brian Lowe, the boyfriend of prisoner Phyllis Hunt in revenge towards Ann Reynolds he feels is the blame for her bashing and causing her brain damage. After his death, Meg feels remorse about it and wish she could have worked something out with Phil.
- Leonard Edwin/Edward/Arthur "Len" Murphy – "Chuckles" (Maurie Fields – episodes 493–511), a former officer at Woodridge men's prison, Len was a sinister, homophobic, murderous male counterpart to "The Freak". He told Judy Bryant to her face that she was "a filthy detestable lesbian animal". The women were first warned about him by Stan Dobson who had worked with him at Woodridge. Carried out the multiple rapes of Lou Kelly. His evil nature caused Joan Ferguson, Judy Bryant and Myra Desmond to unusually work together and set Len up for the rape of Pixie Mason. Their set up was successful and Len is last seen when Joan is visiting Len in an overnight jail cell.
- Di Hagen (Christine Andrew episodes 501–692) Another senior officer who had minor speaking roles, through the series.
- Mervin John "Merv The Perv" Pringle (Ernie Bourne – episodes 523–691), prison cook well liked by the women. Fell in love with and married officer Joyce Barry.
- Pippa Reynolds (Christine Harris – episodes 540–604), Governor Ann Reynolds' spirited, fashion-conscious daughter who teaches an art class at Wentworth and starts a tempestuous relationship with lawyer Ben Fulbright.
- Terri Malone (Margot Knight – episodes 540–576), bisexual young officer who temporarily became Joan Ferguson's live-in lover.
- Geoffrey Chaucer (Roy Bauldwin – episodes 558–568), Head Of The department who attempts to falsely accuse Officer Pat Slattery of 'fixing the books' at Wentworth. Ann Reynolds realises the scam had been going on for many years before Pat started. When Ann confronts Mr. Chaucer as the real culprit, he threatens to plant evidence against her.
- Dr. Steve Ryan (Peter Hayes – episodes 592–628), a well-meaning doctor who secretly conducts research at Wentworth posing as a general handyman and subsequently falls in love with young Julie Egbert.
- Bob Moran (Peter Adams – episodes 595–620), a tough Vietnam veteran who is Acting Governor during one of the most violent periods in the series. including the great riot of 600. He resigned during his period as an officer.
- Marty Jackson (Michael Winchester – episodes 625–692), the son of Meg Jackson, who had followed his mother into the prison officers' profession and shared her compassionate attitude towards the women, although, like his mother, he wasn't a pushover either. (Note: The character of Marty Jackson had appeared in the series on two previous occasions. He was played by Ronald Korosy during the opening episodes and by Andrew McKaige for two stints during the 1983 run.)
- Rodney Adams (Philip Hyde – episodes 630–692), an evil, sinister and nasty trainee officer who thinks he is great at his job but is generally despised by both prisoners and staff. He tries to rule Wentworth with an iron fist but is seen as a complete joke by the women (and most of the staff!). He is made a fool of many times by the inmates.
- Delia Stout (Desirée Smith – episodes 630–679), dedicated trainee officer who was seen as a soft touch by the women but she was a hard working and compassionate officer. Delia harbours a secret crush on colleague Marty Jackson. She vanished from the show without any explanation. The reason being that Desirée Smith's contract was not renewed and she was meant to have been given an exit storyline but due to the announcement that the series was being axed for good coming around the same time, scripts had to be suddenly re-worked and Delia's exit was dropped because of this. She is however mentioned by Marty Jackson in episode 686 in regards to helping him start decorating his apartment hinting that Delia is still around despite not being seen.
- Pamela Madigan (Justine Saunders – episodes 653–668), an aboriginal social worker working with Sarah West and an old friend of governor Ann Reynolds.
- Terry Walters (Bruce Kilpatrick – episodes 665–677), Officer at Blackmoor. He is taken hostage during riot, and exchanged for Bongo, witnessing Craven's double-crossing of Rita and his order that Bongo be shot. He is traced by Phil Clayton and "persuaded" by Ann to appear on "City Probe" to discredit Craven after his death.
- Ernest Craven (Ray Meagher – episodes 665–672), (Ray Meagher's 3rd role in the series) the Governor of corrupt neighbouring high security prison "Blackmoor". Transferred to Wentworth after Rita burnt down Blackmoor. his vow to kill Rita was almost taken through with but failed. at the same time he was blackmailing Lorelei to lag on the prisoners so he could discover what their plans were. Rita asked Lorelei to hide the knife she attempted to kill him with but she failed to when Craven's last threat was made to blackmail her because of the alarm they used to find out when Craven was attacking Rita. She stabbed him and he staggered through the corridors until dying in front of the prisoners, Joan Ferguson and Meg Morris but he still made one more lunge for Rita.
- Tom Lucas (John McTernan – episodes 687–692), maverick teacher who arrives at Wentworth to tutor the women, forming particularly strong friendships with prisoners Merle Jones and Kath Maxwell.
