= List of Prisoner characters – miscellaneous =

== A list of miscellaneous characters in the television series Prisoner ==
Listed in order of appearance:

- Eddie Cook (Richard Moir - episodes 1-16), an original character, electrician Eddie was contracted to do repair work at the prison. At Wentworth, he enjoys the company of inmate Marilyn Mason and so finds reasons to prolong his work, with the pair stowing away for a number of romantic liaisons - notably up in the rec room roof during the riot of episodes 3-4 in which Meg Jackson's husband Bill is killed. When Marilyn is released, the pair move in together, but Marilyn is hard up for money and finding it hard to get work, so reluctantly turns back to prostitution (albeit to afford to buy Eddie a gift for his birthday), leaving Marilyn back inside and putting a severe strain on their relationship. With Marilyn released a second time, Bea Smith eventually sets them straight, arranging for them to run Monica Ferguson's milk bar, which we later hear of them buying permanently.
- Judith-Anne Watkins (Kim Deacon - episodes 5-67), Mum's granddaughter, and the only member of her family to take any interest in her. Visits her in Wentworth to reveal she is pregnant, and shortly afterwards moves into a flat with Mum after her release. When Bea seeks refuge with them when she is on the run, she uses all of Mum's savings to buy a disguise for Bea, just to get rid of her. Reintroduced when Mum's health deteriorates and she is due to give birth. Karen Travers is persuaded to move in and look after her while Mum is in hospital. She gives birth to a son and is reconciled with her mother. Both she and Mum go back to live in the family home.
- Doug Parker (John Arnold - episodes 7-14), a male prisoner working outside the fence at Wentworth. He becomes friendly with Lynn Warner while she is working in the garden, and after they are both released, he visits Lynn at her parents’ farm and they run away together. They move in with Doug's friend Bernie and get married, but Bernie involves them both in a payroll snatch, and Doug is caught and gets shot by a police officer and later dies in hospital, hence Lynn is recaptured.
- Detective Inspector Jack Grace (Terry Gill - episodes 8-635), a cynical and overbearing Detective Inspector who becomes the main representative of the police force in the series.
- Ethel Warner (Beverly Dunn - episodes 10-11), Lynn's mother, who seems more concerned with her social standing in the local community than her daughter's problems.
- Steve Wilson (James Smillie - episodes 15-42), a slick, dashing solicitor who represents a number of the women during the mid-first year of the series. His main case is that of Karen Travers, and with her permitted day release to study at University, the pair start to become romantically involved, although it does not extend much beyond holding hands. However, with his position at the struggling law practice jeopardised (mostly due to all of the unpaying cases he is taking at Wentworth), when an old flame suddenly reappears and offers to go into business him, and believing Karen not to be interested in him, he leaves for the new venture, and is not heard from again in the series.
- Jason Richards (David Bradshaw - episodes 27-29), Pop star who is alleged to be the lover of Susan Rice's husband Frederick. In fact, they are the same person, and this is her way of expressing her feelings about him deserting her for his career. Susan throws acid in his face during a live TV show, but he has also been seen in flashback.
- Dr. Weissman (Bryon Williams) - episodes 28-589), a psychiatrist called into Wentworth to examine several of the inmates throughout the series.
- Colin "Col" Burke (Brian Granrot - episodes 33-35), Noeline's hopeless brother, first seen visiting her in prison with her daughter, Leanne and again on his own. He is shot during a failed robbery at Noeline's old employers, the Woods'.
- Leila Fletcher (Penny Ramsey - episodes 42-109), Jim Fletcher's estranged wife, who first appears leaning out of a window telling a drunken Jim to shut up or he'll wake the kids. In her early episodes, she seems cast as the stereotyped bitter ambitious wife. She becomes a little more sympathetic after she shows her dislike for Jim's mate, Geoff Butler when Jim invites him to dinner. She is introduced again when she throws Jim out of the house after she is told about his relationship with Caroline Simpson. Eventually dies with her children in a bomb blast intended to kill Jim, unknowingly planted by Caroline's husband, Michael, orchestrated by Geoff.
- Peter Clements (Carrillo Gantner - episodes 44-52), a sleazy and manipulative psychology lecturer, who teaches at the University that Karen attends, and who is granted permission to conduct research into prison life at Wentworth, but who is covertly studying the officers rather more than the prisoners. His case study of Doreen causes her to have a breakdown, and he is also duped by Bea into giving information over mysterious new prisoner, Bella Albrecht. His findings over the running of the prison and its staff causes the Department embarrassment, but the storyline seems to fade away without much impact.
- Angela Jeffries (Jeanie Drynan - episodes 59-114), a lesbian lawyer involved with the Prison Reform Group and in the plan to set up a halfway house. She offers Karen accommodation and a job, so Karen moves in with her for a while. Angela has to warn Karen off from falling in love with her. She helps to get Pat O'Connell transferred to Wentworth and handles Pat's divorce then disappears from the series for a while when she hands over the halfway house for Karen to run. When Karen is shot by David O'Connell, she defends him while also handling Pat's appeal and running the halfway house. She continues to be mentioned for some time after her last appearance, for instance in 114 in connection with Doreen's mother's will.
- Ted Douglas (Ian Smith - episodes 61-382), the pompous, generally disliked representative of the Department Of Corrective Services, forever visiting Wentworth to demand that governor Erica Davidson increase security. A partnership with elusive criminal Lionel Fellowes eventually led to his unceremonious downfall.
- David O'Connell (David Letch - episodes 69-79), Son of Pat O'Connell, first mentioned by name in 68, when we find that he is in Pentridge with his father. The scriptwriters stretch co-incidence to its limits by getting him to Wentworth in the next episode in a prison work party so that Pat can talk to him and tell him why she's divorcing his father. When Pat gets paroled just before Christmas, she visits him in Pentridge and sees him get punched by one of the guards. Shortly after this, David escapes and seeks shelter with his friend Shayne. When he goes to see his mother, the police are already on their way, and there is a shootout in which David kills a policeman. As a result his mother is sent back to Wentworth, and David becomes convinced that Greg Miller tipped off the police. With his friend Herbie, he plans to kill Greg, but shoots Karen instead. Herbie becomes worried about him and leads the police to their hideout, where David is recaptured and is not seen again. In episode 80 Angela Jeffries tells Pat that David will plead insanity and as a result will probably spend the rest of his life in an institution. After his preliminary hearing goes badly, Erica tells Pat that David has hung himself in his cell.
- Geoff Butler (Ray Meagher - episodes 78-112), an old friend of deputy governor Jim Fletcher from when they fought together in Vietnam, who arrives in the area claiming to be a high-flying insurance broker, and whom Jim offers somewhere to stay. Jim's wife, Leila is highly suspicious of Geoff, particularly after a past violent incident from the Army days, and when Geoff begins seeing Meg, Leila warns her of her concerns. Geoff also tries to get Jim interested in joining him in becoming part of a mercenary army overseas. When Jim and Geoff are out for a drink one evening, a homosexual man is found badly beaten in the toilets soon after. Following the previous incident, Leila is convinced Geoff is behind it, but Jim refuses to listen. By the time Leila finally convinces Jim to contact the Police about him, Geoff is in the middle of attacking Meg in her apartment after Leila's warnings turned her away from him. Jim arrives just in time to save Meg, and the Police take Geoff away. However, the character returns in 106 to face trial and escapes charge. Embittered at his friend Jim turning him in, Geoff joins forces with Caroline Simpson's estranged husband Michael, who is jaded at Jim seeing his ex-wife. The pair plot to get even with Jim; Michael does not want anyone seriously hurt, but Geoff tricks him into delivering a bomb to Jim's hotel room intended to kill him. Instead, the bomb kills Leila and the children. Geoff makes one final attempt at the devastated Jim back at home, until a Police marksman shoots him.
- Tony Reid (John Higginson - episodes 88-132), Paul Reid's teenage son who leaves college and befriends a woman named Sally who buys drugs off Sharon Gilmour. Tony is caught paying for drugs and is later bailed by Paul. A man named Bill becomes jealous of Tony and Sally's relationship. Tony later assaults the man leading him to a one year sentence. he is released on a good behaviour bond after 6 months in prison.
- Rhonda West (Joan Letch - episodes 89-104), Takes over the running of the first halfway house after Karen leaves.
- Kevin Arnold Burns (Ian Gilmour - episodes 89-139; seen in recap of 140 and in a flashback in episode 154), a young man who meets Doreen when she is out on parole and is working at a packing company under a false name. Although he initially comes across as a carefree individual who likes to flirt with female co-workers, it soon becomes apparent that Kevin is an honest and well-intentioned young man who cares deeply for Doreen. He becomes curious about her secret background (she is living at the Halfway House at the time), and after he finds out her true identity he sticks with her, willing to accept her for whatever she is. He soon proposes to her and they plan to marry, much to the disdain of his rather snobbish mother. However, a drunken incident sees Doreen, and Lizzie, breaking parole and sent back to Wentworth, but Kevin tells Doreen that he is willing to wait for her. When a tussle breaks out over Doreen's late mother's house, which crooked land developers want to buy up cheap, the pair decide to marry on Wentworth grounds. A while later, Doreen is included as part of the prison's work project with a local textile company, where worker Vince Talbot rapes Doreen. She soon discovers that she is pregnant as a result; Doreen considers not letting on and claiming the child to be Kevin's, but when, unaware of her condition, he says that he is not ready to start a family yet, Doreen plans an abortion, before breaking down and admitting that she was raped by Talbot. The Police do not have enough evidence to charge Talbot, and Doreen admits to Kevin that on a second occasion, she allowed Talbot, in hope of gaining the information needed for Kevin to win a lucrative work contract at the factory. This confession puts a strain on the pair's marriage and Kevin decides he wants a divorce. This leads to Doreen to try and commit suicide; after she is rescued just in time, guilt-ridden Kevin visits and offers to try and patch things up with her, but Doreen realises it is time to stand on her own two feet, and the pair part company.
- Brian Williams (Terry McDermott - episodes 89), the violent husband of Vivienne Williams. Caroline (Brian's daughter) later stabbed him just before he pulled the trigger on Vivienne he is also seen in episode 114 when Vivienne and Caroline have flashbacks in court.
- Michael Simpson (Peter Ford - episodes 95-112), Caroline Simpson's soon to be divorced husband. During the time Caroline has a relationship with Jim Fletcher he plans to take revenge on Jim. Later at Geoff Butler's trial he overhears Geoff saying he will get back at him. The two then pair up but Michael does not want anyone hurt. Geoff tells Michael he will plant drugs on Jim, but in episode 108 we find out that there is a bomb in the package it blows up Jim's family in episode 109. When Michael finds out Geoff kidnaps Michael. Michael is last seen at the halfway house telling Caroline the truth when the police arrest him
- Ken Pearce (Tom Oliver - episodes 104-191), a prison reform advocate who had previously served time for armed robbery and comes to oversee a new drama group in the prison, arousing the romantic feelings of Bea Smith in the process.
- David Austin (Rod Mullinar - episodes 113-124), a smarmy art dealer of prisoner Kerry Vincent (Penny Downie), who is exploiting Kerry's art to drum up publicity and sell her work for huge profit. During this period, Kerry also gives Vera one of her paintings that she intends to destroy, only for Austin to concoct a story of Vera bribing it out of Kerry, in order to give him more publicity, nearly costing Vera her job until Jock Stewart helps her set things straight with Austin. As a result, Austin is banned from visiting her at Wentworth. Jock Stewart then returns the painting Kerry gave Vera back to her, to which she would then give to Doreen as a wedding present in episode 117. In the same episode, Kerry is given parole and set up in a small studio flat, but only on the proviso that she does not see Austin. Kerry is oblivious to his manipulating her and continues seeing him, and becomes jealous of other women he is seeing. When Austin insults her, an enraged and drunken Kerry smashes him over the head with an ashtray, causing her to think she has killed him. Austin however survives the attack and is visited by Paul Reid, deciding not to press charges against Kerry. In episode 124, he then visits Doreen to buy the painting Kerry gave to her which he wanted to make a profit off of. Prison officer Meg Jackson is watching over the interview, and knowing what type of person Austin was, both she and Paul Reid intervene help keep Austin from buying the painting from Doreen.
- Andrew Reynolds (John Lee - episodes 125-136), the owner of a clothing factory where the women are sent on work release who has a brief romance with governor Erica Davidson.
- Vince Talbot (John Larking - episodes 125-136), Foreman at the factory where the women get work release, first seen complaining about the use of cheap labour to undercut his workers. Doreen tries to get information out of him to help Kevin, but he demands sex with her in return, and rapes her when she refuses. The women get their revenge with the help of Kay White, who contacts Vince and asks him to visit her in Wentworth and the other women attack Vince as he is leaving and give him a good kicking.
- Bob Morris (Anthony Hawkins - episodes 143-260), a businessman who meets officer Meg Jackson when his daughter Tracey is an inmate at Wentworth. They marry, but Meg's devotion to her job at the prison and Bob's expectations that Meg be a conventional corporate wife causes the marriage to fall apart. Actor Anthony Hawkins made an uncredited appearance in Episode 86 as DS Little, interviewing Lizzie Birdsworth about a significant development in the case of her original conviction.
- Albert "Wally" Wallace (Alan Hopgood - episodes 167-466), a non-conformist man who lives alone in the country and befriends Judy Bryant when she is on the run. He later joins her in running the halfway house, and also has a relationship with governor Ann Reynolds.
- Florence Marne (Aileen Britton - episodes 208-209), Erica Davidson's mother. She dies in episode 209 whilst undergoing surgery for a cerebral thrombosis.
- Mrs. Matheson (Dorothy Bradley - episode 241), Kate Peterson's mother.
- Jennifer Powell (Sarah Machin - episodes 272-433), Colleen Powell's teenage daughter, she was kidnapped by armed robbers after they realise she has recognised one of them and was later raped by Doug She was re-introduced years later into the series only to be killed in a car bomb intended for Rick Manning.
- Tony Berman (Alan David Lee - episodes 306-329), a young social worker who becomes Judy Bryant's assistant at Driscoll House.
- Beryl Hudson (Esme Melville - episodes 311-312), an ex-con living at the halfway house.
- Sara Hamilton (Celia de Burgh - episodes 324-332), a young law student who goes to live at the halfway house as disciplinary action for drug charges. During her stay, her boyfriend Alan Jeffries comes to visit and he and the despondent Sara make a suicide pact by taking a drug overdose. Unfortunately, Sara survives and her boyfriend's father has her arrested for manslaughter. With help from her own legal expertise, as well as Judy Bryant, Sara gets Alan's father to reveal that he too was partly to blame for what happened. As a result, the charges against Sara are dropped and this is the last appearance of the character.
- Belle Peters (Lesley Baker - episodes 390-392), A bikie who meets up with Maxine while she is on the run and involves her in a burglary, during which Maxine is shot by a security guard. Belle looks up Judy at Driscoll House, and leaves the $20,000 from the burglary as a going away present.
- Alice Dodds (Julia Blake - episodes 404-407), a prim Englishwoman sent to help Wally Wallace run Driscoll House after Judy Bryant's imprisonment for the mercy killing of Hazel Kent. Initially, she was shown to be severely strict, introducing harsh rules and curfews that caused the residents to practically rebel against, leaving Wally on the verge of walking out. In the end, Alice eased down her attitude after Wally caught her slapping a resident who became upset when Alice failed to sympathize with her about her abusive husband. Alice later reveals that she used a tough attitude as means to cope with being an abused wife herself. Her last appearance was in episode 407 when she heroically put up a fight against another resident's husband after he ambushed the halfway house with a gun, resulting in her being wounded. She is actually only grazed by the bullet and recovers quickly and returns to work. She is not seen again after this but is referred to in episode 429 when Wally reveals that Alice had a breakdown and he needed another assistant for the halfway house, leading to the reintroduction of Myra Desmond to the series.
- Kay Desmond (Sallyann Bourne - episodes 430-556), First seen as Myra's overdeveloped teenage daughter. Arrested but not jailed for possession of drugs at the party thrown by Gloria. Gives evidence against Myra at her trial. When she visits Myra she is in such bad shape that Myra decides to escape to help her get off drugs. Kay is over the worst so Myra leaves her with Wally and gives herself up. Kay returns to visit Myra in jail. Last credit at Myra's funeral.
- Shane Munroe (Robert Summers - episodes 462-527), a young boy who runs away from his abusive father and breaks into Joan Ferguson's house looking for food and is taken in by Joan. After he gets stuck in a drain trying to save his dog, his father turns up at the hospital and threatens Joan. Joan then starts a custody battle with his father and although she loses, Shane is sent to a children's home where Joan visits him. Shane is then adopted by the Taylor family, where he continues to escape from them and seek refuge with Joan. After Joan meets his new foster parents, she realises she must break all ties with Shane and when he escapes from them again to stay with Joan, she rejects him and he runs away. Last seen in hospital with Joan where she wishes him goodbye.
- Rita (Jenny Seedsman - episodes 475-477), Social worker during the officers' strike. Her last name is never mentioned.
- Rob Summerton (Jeremy Kewley) - episodes 476), Possibly the shortest ever appearance by a named character. He is one of the social workers drafted in to Wentworth during the officers' strike. He barely has time to establish that he has a wife and small children before he encounters Bev Baker in a corridor and she stabs him to death with a skewer.
- Marnie Taylor (Joy Dunstan - episodes 513-527), Shane's adoptive mother with her husband Bob and daughter Tracy.
- James Dwyer (James Condon - episodes 561-689), the second major Departmental representative of the series, who frequently clashes with governor Ann Reynolds.
- Ben Fulbright (Kevin Summers - episodes 563-604), solicitor representing prisoner Daphne Graham in her PMT appeal case who falls in love with Pippa Reynolds.
- David Adams (Richard Moss - episodes 576-588), Eve Wilder's psycho obsessed solicitor who still takes on her case even though he finds the missing bullet the police couldn't find. His relationship with Eve is first suspected by Joyce Barry, but she later overhears her confession which leads to her being bashed and Reb Kean taking the blame for it. David breaks up with Eve when he can't go through with finishing Joyce off whilst she is in a coma. He returns later and shoots himself in front of Eve but leaves a note for Ann Reynolds which leads to Reb Kean's release. David Adam's departure also led to Eve's evil side being exposed.
- Joe McCormack (John Larking - episodes 589-591), Nancy's husband. After seeing his casual treatment of his wife, we learn that he has a girlfriend and is about to leave Nancy. Before he can do so, he is involved in an argument with his son Peter, which develops into a fight. Joe falls and hits his head on a coffee table, killing him.
- Dan Moulton (Sean Scully - episodes 590-654), minister who is involved with Rita Connors' bike gang, The Conquerors. Has a relationship with governor Ann Reynolds.
- Bongo Connors (Shane Connor - episodes 595-667), Rita Connors' tearaway younger brother. He goes nuts and nearly kills Dan in an escape attempt. While Rita and Bongo are both at Blackmoor, Bongo is shot dead by a marksman on Craven's orders.
- Harry Bassinger (John Frawley - episodes 602-620), A respected elderly ex-cop with a grudge against prisoners and escapee. Murdered Nora Flynn in 597 leaving a mystery. He is seen in 599 gluing in evidence of Lexie's escape though only his hands are shown. Next seen in 602 taking a hunting knife out of his bag. In 603 when Jessie leaves the house he knocks on the door with flowers for Jessie but Lexie tells him to leave it on the step. When she opens the door to take the flowers he grabs her and follows her inside ready to kill her when she breaks a vase over his head. Lexie and Jessie then call the police but they don't believe them and the two are sent back to Wentworth. He is seen again in 608 telling his son that he is taking Amelia (his wife) on a holiday and that he should blow over his cover. His son Gary rings Wentworth offering to "capture" current escapee Lou Kelly, but while Jessie is in hospital she escapes with an undercover cop to catch Bassinger out. Bassinger kidnaps them both but undercover cop Tom Harley breaks free and arrests him. Jessie is released and tells Lexie and Bob the good news.
- Zoe Wilkinson (Ashby Redward- episodes 623-677), Lorelei's daughter, first seen when Lorelei visits her at her mother's house where she is babysitting her. Lorelei is then arrested for theft and impersonating a police officer and sent to Wentworth. Whilst Lorelei is in Wentworth, her mother becomes too ill to look after Zoe and gives her to the Hosking family to look after while she is in hospital. After Lorelei is acquitted of her charges she finds out her mother has died and the Hosking family are refusing to give Zoe back. After Lorelei loses the custody battle, she commits an armed robbery and kidnaps Zoe but later returns her to the Hosking family as she has nowhere to stay. When Lorelei returns to Wentworth, she has a mental breakdown and is sent to Ingleside where the Hosking family bring Zoe to see her.
- Danielle McCormack (Sarah Machin - episodes 644-649), The wife of Peter McCormack, Nancy's son. First seen when Peter brings her to see his mother in Wentworth to tell her the news that they are married and that she is pregnant. Soon afterwards, Nancy starts to suspect Peter of beating Danielle and asks Meg to investigate. After being beaten several times, Danielle reports Peter to the police and after she is not believed, tells them the truth about who really killed Peter's father.
- Roo Morgan (Sally McKenzie - episodes 666-667), Top dog at Blackmoor until Rita defeats her in an arranged fight. possibly killed in the riot after being held down by Spike and Brumby.

== Multiple Roles ==
Many characters were portrayed by recurring actors throughout the series' run.

Actor	Role 1	Role 2	Role 3	Role 4
Lesley Baker	Monica Ferguson	Belle Peters		
Julia Blake	Evelyn Randall	Alice Dodds	Nancy McCormack	
Carl Bleazby	Hugh Gilbertson	Magistrate	Major Ferguson	
Ernie Bourne	Doctor	Peter Hope	Mervin Pringle	
Aileen Britton	Florence Marne	Mrs. Hartley		
Anne Charleston	Lorraine Watkins	Policewoman	Diedre Keen	
Kirsty Child	Anne Yates	Glynis Quinn	Willie Beecham	
Liddy Clark	Bella Albrecht	Sharon Smart		
Jane Clifton	Yvonne	Margo Gaffney		
Shane Connor	Kevin Armstrong	Bongo Connors		
Diane Craig	Sarah Forrest	Anita Selby		
Valma Pratt	Dot	Matron Schwartz	Mrs. Hudson	Taps
Belinda Davey	Prison Nurse	Hazel Kent		
Stefan Dennis	Shayne Berkley	Spike	Peter Richards	
Christine Earle	Rachel Freeman	Janet Williams		
Maureen Edwards	Gracie	Hazel Crow	Officer Sue Bailey	TV Newsreader
Maurie Fields	Uncle Archie	Maurie Parks	Officer Len Murphy	
Jan Friedl	Barnhurst Officer	Brenda Latham		
Robyn Gibbes	Melissa Norton	Sam Greenway		
Bernadette Gibson	Vivienne Williams	Mrs. Daniels		
Vince Gill	Wayne Bradshaw	Joe Palmer	Tom Hartley	
Eve Godley	Mrs. Dennis	Mrs. Landon	Mrs. Warren	
Diana Greentree	Nightclub Singer	Sister Franklin	Mrs. Egbert	
Billie Hammerberg	Valerie Richardson	May Collins		
Anthony Hawkins	Detective Sergeant Little	Bob Morris		
Liddy Holloway	Sister Kelly	Sister Hainer		
May Howlett	Mrs. Downer	Vera Rodgers		
Brian James	Dr. Kennedy	Officer Stan Dobson		
Val Jellay	Mrs. Bessie	Mrs. Gibson	Mabel Morgan	
Sue Jones	Sister Brookes	Kathy Hall		
Jackie Kelleher	Gwen Hill	Marjorie Malone		
Bruce Kerr	Mr. Harris	Maxie	Gordon Humphrey	
Dawn Klingberg	Wentworth Officer	Driscol House Druggie - Ellen	Daphne Graham's mother	Parole Board Member for Karen Travers (ep. 54)
Margot Knight	Sharon Gilmour	Terri Malone		
Debra Lawrance	Hospital Nurse	Officer Sally Dean	Daphne Graham	
Sarah Machin	Jennifer Powell	Danielle McCormack		
Dina Mann	Debbie Pearce	Samantha Russell		
Babs McMillan	Miss Vaughan	Cass Parker		
Ray Meagher	Geoff Butler	Kurt Renner	Ernest Craven	
Esme Melville	Freda	Beryl Hudson	Charlady	Granny Wilkinson
Maria Mercedes	Irini Zervos	Yemil Bakarta		
Carmel Millhouse	Mary Healy	Mrs. Beamish	Mother Mary Helen Sexton	
Julieanne Newbould	Hannah Simpson	Wendy Glover		
Gerda Nicolson	Officer Roberts (Barnhurst)	Governor Ann Reynolds		
Anne Phelan	Officer Manson	Bernadette	Myra Desmond	
Lois Ramsey	Agnes Forster	Ettie Parslow		
Penny Ramsey	Leila Fletcher	Amy Ryan		
Ian Smith	Ted Douglas	Mr Potter (Father of Pixie)	Policeman	
Peter Stratford	Detective Sergeant Gleason	Crown Prosecutor	Julian Phillips	George Costello
Rob Steele	Dr Rupert	Patrick Powell		
Babs Wheeldon	Mrs. Burns	Mrs. Collins		
Myrtle Woods	Amelia Humber	Mrs. Adams		
Adrian Wright	Detective Graham Lang	Neil Murray		
Paul Young	Captain Lloyd Barton	Trevor Priest		
Nicki Paull	Doris Cruickshank	Lisa Mullins		
Andrea Butcher	Sarah Roberts	Gloria Scott	Sandra Williams	
Beverley Phillips	Valda Warren	Marion Pearce	Muriel Baxter	Edith Marsh

Probably the most prolific recurring actor was Denzil Howson, who appeared regularly in minor parts throughout the entire series' run. He played everything from a Salvation Army Major, to Doctors, Judges, Lawyers, fathers and husbands of prisoners and the head of the Social Welfare department. There were many other actors who played multiple minor roles too such as Will Deumer (including roles as Lionel Fellowes, a Doctor, Sailor, Boss) and Arthur Barradell-Smith to name but two.
