= Deidre Rubenstein =

Australian actress and writer (born 1948)

- Born: Deidre Rubenstein; 28 February 1948; Melbourne, Victoria, Australia
- Education: National Institute of Dramatic Art
- Occupations: Actor, dramatist, playwright
- Years active: 1966–current

Deidre Rubenstein (born 1948) is an Australian screen and theatre actress, dramatist and playwright, well known for her performance in Australian soap operas and main stage dramatic roles.

== Early life ==
Rubenstein, who is Jewish, graduated from the National Institute of Dramatic Art (NIDA) in 1967.

== Career ==
=== Television and film ===
Rubenstein has worked in television comedies, drama, mini-series and TV movies. In 1970 she appeared in an episode of Homicide. She played a recurring guest role in Prisoner (1979–80), as terrorist Janet Dominguez.

She had leading roles in 1990 film Breaking Through and 1985 miniseries Palace of Dreams, the latter for which she won an Australian Film Institute Award for Best Actress.

In 2004 Rubenstein played the scheming Svetlanka Ristic for twelve episodes of the soap opera Neighbours.

She has appeared in further guest roles in 1980 miniseries Water Under The Bridge, medical dramas G.P. and MDA, Mercury, comedy series Introducing Gary Petty, The Secret Life of Us, Kick and police dramas Blue Heelers and City Homicide.

Rubenstein also has appeared in Australian feature films Siam Sunset (1999), Hey Hey It’s Esther Blueberger alongside Keisha Castle-Hughes and Essie Davis (2008), Salvation with Wendy Hughes (2008) and Force of Destiny alongside David Wenham (2015).

=== Theatre ===
Rubenstein's career in the theatre includes work with several major Australian companies, including the Nimrod Theatre Company and Melbourne Theatre Company.

In 1993, she had a solo show called What's a Girl to Do?, where she performed poems written by contemporary Australian female poets. It was later performed by Rubenstein at The Stables Theatre in Sydney (1994) and at the 1995 Edinburgh Festival.

This show inspired her to do another solo show using work commissioned for her, work that was written to be performed live. She was awarded a Victorian Government Women Artist's Grant and commission contemporary writers to produce the performance pieces that were later produced in a book called Confidentially Yours. The first performance was in the Playbox Theatre Centre, C.U.B Malthouse, Melbourne on 11 February 1998. The writers commissioned to produce the work that became Confidentially Yours were Janis Balodis, Andrew Bovell, Nick Enright, Michael Gurr, Daniel Keene, Joanna Murray-Smith and Debra Oswald. Andrew Bovell wrote a pair of stories for the show that he later used in the script for the film Lantana.

In 2005, Rubenstein performed in Menopause the Musical, a comedy breaking down the taboos about menopause. with Caroline Gillmer, Susan-Ann Walker and Jane Clifton. Rubenstein as 'The Dubbo Housewife', explored the stereotypes and madness of that time in a woman's life.

In 2015, she played Gertrude Stein in the musical Loving Repeating - a Musical of Gertrude Stein in Melbourne.

=== Audiobooks ===
Rubenstein has produced a significant body of work as a narrator of audio books and has won several awards in this field.

== Filmography ==
=== Film ===
Year	Title	Role	Type
1990	Breaking Through	Ann	Film
1991	The Girl Who Came Late (aka Daydream Believer)	Trish Schultz	Feature film
1996	Inner Sanctuary	Peggy	Feature film
1999	Siam Sunset	Celia Droon	Feature film
2000	The Calling	Martha O’Connor	Short film
2001	Like Mother Like Son: The Strange Story of Sante and Kenny Kimes	Las Vegas Judge	TV film
2002	Secret Bridesmaids' Business	Ruth	TV film
2004	Josh Jarman	Theatre Actress	Feature film
2008	Salvation	Gloria’s Coach	Feature film
2008	Hey Hey It’s Esther Blueburger	Mrs Fleisher	Feature film
2011	Underbelly Files: The Man Who Got Away	Uncredited	TV film
2015	Force of Destiny	Miriam	Feature film
2023	The Rooster	Mrs Poulson	Feature film

=== Television ===
Year	Title	Role	Type
1970	Homicide	Jane	TV series, 1 episode
1978–1980	Prisoner	Janet Dominguez	TV series, 5 episodes
1980	Water Under the Bridge	Lainey	TV series, 3 episodes
1982	The Mike Walsh Show	Guest (with Tony Taylor)	TV series, 1 episode
1985	Palace of Dreams	Chana Mendel	Miniseries, 10 episodes
1988	Australians	Nance	Miniseries, 1 episode
1988	Rafferty's Rules	Peggy Guest	TV series, 1 episode
1988	A Country Practice	Helen Morris	TV series, 2 episodes
1989	E Street	Louise Baker	TV series, 1 episode
1989	G.P.	Iris Grimshaw	TV series, 3 episodes
1996	Mercury	Steffi Petrakis	Miniseries, 2 episodes
1997–2003	Blue Heelers	Helen Delaney / Magda Lapenscu	TV series, 2 episodes
2000	Introducing Gary Petty	Nancy	TV series, 6 episodes
2001–2002	BackBerner	Psychologist	TV series, 2 episodes
2002	The Secret Life of Us	Nathan’s Mum	TV series, 2 episodes
2002	MDA	Dr Fallows	TV series, 1 episode
2004	Neighbours	Svetlanka Ristic	TV series, 12 episodes
2007	Kick	Reva Feinmann	Miniseries, 1 episode
2008	Saddle Club	Rosemary Cross	TV series, 1 episode
2008	City Homicide	Cheridah Lapstone	TV series, 1 episode
2021	Superwog	Agnes	YouTube series, 1 episode
2024	White Fever	Grandma Coral	TV series, 1 episode

== Theatre ==
=== As actor ===
Year	Title	Role	Type
1966	Two Programs of Short Plays: The Pier	Second Girl	Jane Street Theatre, Sydney
1967	Camille and Perdican	Dame Pluche	UNSW, Old Tote Theatre, Sydney, with NIDA & Australian Elizabethan Theatre Trust
1967	Point of Departure	Cashier / Mother	UNSW, Old Tote Theatre, Sydney, with NIDA & Australian Elizabethan Theatre Trust
1967	Three Men on a Horse	Hotel Maid	UNSW, Old Tote Theatre, Sydney, with NIDA
1967	The Schoolmistress		UNSW, Old Tote Theatre, Sydney
1967	The Winter’s Tale	Perdita	UNSW, Old Tote Theatre, Sydney, with NIDA
1968; 1969	The Boy Friend	Hortense	Canberra Theatre, Phillip Street Theatre, Sydney, Comedy Theatre, Melbourne with Harry M. Miller
1969	The Rise and Fall of Boronia Avenue		Jane Street Theatre, Sydney with NIDA & Old Tote Theatre Company
1970	Cat Among the Pigeons		Russell Street Theatre, Melbourne, Canberra Theatre with MTC
1970	Philadelphia, Here I Come!		Russell Street Theatre with MTC
1970	The Caucasian Chalk Circle	Tractor Driver / Ludovica	Russell Street Theatre
1970	A Doll’s House		Canberra Theatre, Russell Street Theatre with MTC
1970	Day of Glory		Russell Street Theatre with MTC
1970	The Devils		Russell Street Theatre, Melbourne, with MTC
1970	Son of Man		Russell Street Theatre with MTC
1970	The Effect of Gamma Rays on Man-in-the-Moon Marigolds		Russell Street Theatre, Melbourne, with MTC
1970; 1971	All's Well That Ends Well	Diana	Princess Theatre, Melbourne, Canberra Theatre, Octagon Theatre, Perth with MTC
1971	The Government Inspector		Russell Street Theatre, Melbourne, with MTC
1971	The Philanthropist		Russell Street Theatre, Melbourne, with MTC
1971	Galileo		Russell Street Theatre, Melbourne, with MTC
1971	The Contractor		Russell Street Theatre, Melbourne, Canberra Theatre with MTC
1971	The Recruiting Officer		Russell Street Theatre, Melbourne, with MTC
1971	The Trial of the Catonsville Nine		Russell Street Theatre, Melbourne, with MTC
1971; 1972	The Man who Shot the Albatross	Mary Putland	Princess Theatre, Melbourne, Canberra Theatre, Elizabethan Theatre, Sydney, Her Majesty's Theatre, Adelaide with MTC
1975	The Enchanted Forest		St James Playhouse, Sydney with PACT Youth Theatre
1979	The Twenties and All That Jazz		Queensland Theatre
1979	The Ripper Show	Jane Sharpe	Playbox Theatre, Melbourne with Hoopla Theatre Foundation
1980	The Bride of Gospel Place	Delia	Jane Street Theatre, Sydney, with NIDA
1980	The Dybbuk	Frade	Jane Street Theatre, Sydney, with NIDA
1980	You and the Night and the House Wine		Nimrod Theatre, Sydney (also Playwright)
1980; 1981	Catch a Rising Star		Melbourne Theatre Restaurant
1981	Three Sisters	Natalya Ivanova	Nimrod Theatre, Sydney
1981	A Couple of Strangers		Nimrod Theatre, Sydney (also Devisor)
1981	Cloud 9	Edward / Betty	Nimrod Theatre, Sydney
1981	Tales from the Vienna Woods	Alfred's Mother / Various characters	Nimrod Theatre, Sydney
1982	Candide	The Baroness	Seymour Centre, Sydney, Melbourne
1982	Burn Victim	Deidre	Nimrod Theatre, Sydney (also Writer)
1982	Variations	Fran	Nimrod Theatre, Sydney
1983	Top Girls		Nimrod Theatre, Sydney
1983	As You Like It		Nimrod Theatre, Sydney
1986	Mixed Doubles		Wharf Theatre, Sydney, with STC for Sydney Festival
1986	Wild Honey		Seymour Centre, Sydney
1986	She Stoops to Conquer	Mrs Hardcastle	Seymour Centre, Sydney, with Nimrod Theatre Company
1986	The Merchant of Venice		Seymour Centre, Sydney, with Nimrod Theatre Company
1986	All's Well That Ends Well	Circus Style Performer	Seymour Centre, Sydney, with Nimrod Theatre Company
1987	Trumpets and Raspberries		State Theatre Company of Northern Territory
1987	Les Liaisons Dangereuses	Matron	Seymour Centre, Sydney, with Nimrod Theatre Company
1988	Absurd Person Singular	Jane Hopcroft	Playhouse, Adelaide with STCSA
1989	Curtains		Northside Theatre, Sydney
1990	Once in a Lifetime		Sydney Opera House with STC
1991	Morning Sacrifice	Miss Charlotte Bates	Russell Street Theatre with MTC
1991	Heroic Measures	Nadia Ginzburg	Malthouse Theatre, Melbourne with Playbox Theatre Company
1992	Petrov: The Musical		Melbourne Concert Hall with Victorian Arts Centre
1992	No Going Back		Russell Street Theatre with MTC
1992	A Month of Sundays	Mrs Baker	Russell Street Theatre with MTC
1992	When She Danced		Russell Street Theatre with MTC
1993	Blood Moon	Anna	Theatre Works, Melbourne
1993; 1994; 1995	What's a Girl to Do?	Solo show	Malthouse Theatre, Melbourne with Playbox Theatre Company, Stables Theatre, Sydney, Assembly Rooms, Edinburgh for Edinburgh Festival (also Devisor)
1993; 1994; 1995	Dorothy Parker Says	Solo show	Fairfax Studio, Melbourne, Mietta's, Melbourne, Stables Theatre, Sydney, Queanbeyan School of Arts Cafe with Victorian Arts Centre (also Creator)
1994	Song of Songs		Melbourne Athenaeum with Theatreworks
1994	Falling from Grace	Maggie Campbell	Australian national tour with STC, Playbox Theatre Company & Queensland Theatre
1995	The Head of Mary	The Prostitute / Shikuza	Tokyo International Arts Space for Tokyo International Festival, Malthouse Theatre, Melbourne with Playbox Theatre Company
1996	My Father's Father	Marta	Fairfax Studio, Melbourne, with MTC
1996	Broken Glass		Sydney Opera House with STC
1997	The Winter’s Tale	Paulina	Canberra Theatre, Sydney Opera House, Melbourne Athenaeum with Bell Shakespeare
1998	Dream Kitchen	Voice Over Artist (recorded)	Universal Theatre, Melbourne
1998; 2002	Confidentially Yours	Lorna / Various characters	Malthouse Theatre, Melbourne, Illawarra Performing Arts Centre, Butter Factory Theatre, Wodonga with Playbox Theatre Company (also Devisor)
2001	The Seagull	Polina	Playhouse, Melbourne, with MTC
2002	Life x 3	Inès	Playhouse, Melbourne, with MTC
2003	Birthrights	Margaret	Playhouse, Melbourne, with MTC
2003	Bye Bye Birdie	Mrs Mae Peterson	State Theatre, Melbourne with The Production Company
2003	Bat Boy: The Musical		Chapel Off Chapel, Melbourne, with Loudmouth Productions
2004	Night Letters	Innkeeper / Rachel / Patricia Highsmith	Queen's Theatre, Adelaide, Malthouse Theatre, Melbourne with Playbox Theatre Company & STCSA for Adelaide Festival
2005	Menopause the Musical	The Dubbo Housewife	Comedy Theatre, Melbourne, Her Majesty's Theatre, Melbourne with GFour Productions, McPherson Inc & Lascorp Entertainment
2005	The World's Wife	Mrs Midas / Mrs Aesop / Mrs Faust / Medusa / Circe / Mrs Rip Van Winkle / Salome / The Kray Sisters / Pope Joan / Mrs Beast	Fairfax Studio, Melbourne, with MTC
2006	The Clean House	Virginia	Fairfax Studio, Melbourne, with MTC
2007	The Glory	Reading	Fairfax Studio, Melbourne
2007	The History Boys	Mrs Lintott	Playhouse, Melbourne, with MTC
2008	Cat on a Hot Tin Roof	Big Mama	Playhouse, Melbourne, with MTC
2008	Gala		Southbank Theatre, Melbourne, with MTC
2009	August: Osage County	Mattie Fae Aiken	Playhouse, Melbourne, with MTC
2010	Richard III	Duchess of York	Southbank Theatre, Melbourne, with MTC
2010	Life Without Me	Alice Jarvie	Southbank Theatre, Melbourne, with MTC
2011	Dear World	The Countess Aurelia	Melbourne Recital Centre with Magnormos
2011	Circle Mirror Transformation	Marty	Southbank Theatre, Melbourne, with MTC
2012	The Glass Menagerie	Amanda	Dunstan Playhouse, Adelaide with STCSA
2012	His Girl Friday	Mrs Baldwin	Playhouse, Melbourne with MTC
2013	A Murder is Announced	Dora Bunner	Sydney Theatre, Comedy Theatre, Melbourne
2013	Thursday	Various characters	Norwood Concert Hall with English Touring Theatre & Brink Productions for Adelaide Festival
2015	Loving Repeating – a Musical of Gertrude Stein	Gertrude Stein	Chapel Off Chapel, Melbourne, with Vic Theatre Company for Midsumma Festival
2015	North by Northwest	Roger's Mother	Playhouse, Melbourne with MTC
2015; 2016	Ladies in Black	Miss Jacobs / Mrs Crown	Playhouse, Brisbane, Southbank Theatre, Melbourne, with Queensland Theatre
2016	Violet	Mabel / Alice	Chapel Off Chapel, Melbourne, with Blue Saint Productions
2016	My Fair Lady	Mrs Pearce	Sydney Opera House, Lyric Theatre, Brisbane, Regent Theatre, Melbourne, Capitol Theatre, Sydney
2018	A Doll’s House, Part 2	Anne Marie	Southbank Theatre with MTC
2019	Shakespeare in Love	Queen Elizabeth	Canberra Theatre, Playhouse, Melbourne with MTC
2022	Admissions	Roberta	Southbank Theatre, Melbourne, with MTC
2023	Escaped Alone / What If Only	Sally / Fs	Southbank Theatre, Melbourne

=== As crew ===
Year	Title	Role	Type
1980	You and the Night and the House Wine	Playwright / Director	Nimrod Theatre, Sydney
1981	A Couple of Strangers	Devisor	Nimrod Theatre, Sydney
1982	Burn Victim	Writer	Nimrod Theatre, Sydney
1988	You and the Night and the House Wine	Playwright	Riverina Playhouse, Wagga Wagga
1993; 1994; 1995	What's a Girl to Do?	Devisor	Malthouse Theatre, Melbourne with Playbox Theatre Company, Stables Theatre, Sydney, Assembly Rooms, Edinburgh for Edinburgh Festival
1993; 1994; 1995	Dorothy Parker Says	Creator	Fairfax Studio, Melbourne, Mietta's, Melbourne, Stables Theatre, Sydney, Queanbeyan School of Arts Cafe with Victorian Arts Centre
1998; 2002	Confidentially Yours	Devisor	Malthouse Theatre, Melbourne, Illawarra Performing Arts Centre, Butter Factory Theatre, Wodonga with Playbox Theatre Company

== Awards and nominations ==
Year	Work	Award	Category	Result
1986	Palace of Dreams	Australian Film Institute Awards	Best Performance by an Actress in a Mini Series	Won
1996	Deidre Rubenstein	Women Artists Grants	Victorian Government initiative to encourage emerging women artists living and working in Victoria	Honoured
1998	Dreamtime Alice by Mandy Sayer	TDK Australian Audio Book Awards	Narrator Award for Unabridged Fiction	Won
2001	The Architect by Jillian Watkinson	Vision Australia Library Awards	Adult Narrator of the Year Award (joint award with James Wright)	Won

== Bibliography ==
- Rubenstein, Deirdre, ed. (1998). Confidentially yours (Australian Drama – 20th Century). Melbourne: Currency Press, Sydney, in Association with Playbox Theatre Centre, Monash University. ISBN 0-86819-553-7.
