= The Bush Gang =

- Written by: Laura Jones
- Starring: Danny Adcock; Penny Ramsey
- Country of origin: Australia
- Original language: English

Original release
- Network: ABC
- Release: 1981

The Bush Gang is an Australian children's series which first screened on the ABC in 1981. It tells stories of the Marsh family who are from a country town who move to the city after the father loses his job. There is Mr. and Mrs. Marsh and the three Marsh children Karen (15), Jonno (12) and Fran (8).

== Cast ==
- Danny Adcock as Mr Marsh
- Penny Ramsey as Mrs March
- Simon Austin as Jonno
- Vanessa Windsor as Fran
- Joanna Long as Karen
