= Menzies and Churchill at War =

2008 Australian TV documentary film

- Directed by: Steve Jodrell
- Written by: John Moore; Michael Cummins; Steve Jodrell
- Produced by: John Moore
- Starring: Matthew King; Charles 'Bud' Tingwell; Dennis Coard; Margot Knight
- Cinematography: Darrell Martin
- Edited by: Steven Robinson
- Music by: John Clifford White
- Release date: 2008
- Running time: 55 minutes
- Country: Australia
- Language: English

Menzies and Churchill at War is an Australian TV documentary film broadcast on the ABC on 30 October 2008. It tells the story of Robert Menzies's trip to England in 1941 to try convince Winston Churchill to shore up Australia's defences. It was based on David Day's book of the same name. It mixes together archival footage, including footage taken by Menzies himself, with re-enactments.

== Cast ==
- Matthew King as Robert Menzies
- Charles 'Bud' Tingwell as Winston Churchill
- Dennis Coard as Fred Shedden
- Margot Knight as Dame Pattie Menzies
- Chris Waters as Lord Beaverbrook
- Ian McTear as Archibald Sinclair
- Richard Askin as Colin Bednall
- Adam Crouch as Rab Butler
- John Dicks as Alexander Cadogan
- William Gluth as Maurice Hankey
- Simon Rogers as Lord Cranborne
- Noel Herriman as Clement Attlee
- Barry Friedlander as General Dill
- Tim Hughes as Anthony Eden
- Peter Nicholls as Admiral Pound
- Tim Bell as Sir Kingsley Wood
- Jennifer Vuletic as Narrator
