= Mrs. Finnegan =

Australian television series

- Genre: Comedy
- Written by: George Foster; Keith Smith
- Starring: Delore Whiteman; Reg Gorman; Max Cullen; Penny Ramsey; Marion Johns
- Composer: Tommy Tycho
- Country of origin: Australia
- Original language: English
- No. of seasons: 1
- No. of episodes: 13

Production
- Producers: Michael Pate; John Walters
- Running time: 30 minutes

Original release
- Network: ATN7
- Release: 1970 – 1971

Mrs. Finnegan is an Australian sitcom series which screened on the Seven Network in 1970 to 1971. It followed a widow and her son living in a Sydney suburb.

== Cast ==
=== Main ===
- Delore Whiteman as Jessie Finnegan
- Reg Gorman as Darby Finnegan
- Max Cullen as Hilton Harper
- Penny Ramsey as Fay Smith
- Marion Johns as Amy Frizell

=== Guests ===
- Doreen Warburton as Dr Cooper
- Gordon Glenwright as Dobson
- John Derum as Sanderson
- Judy Morris as Receptionist
- Linal Haft as Sergeant Riley
- Peter Collingwood
- Peter Whitford as Clarrie Mooresfield
- Ron Graham as Joe Rooney
- Ron Shand as Dan Smith
- Ruth Cracknell as Mrs Evans

== See also ==
- List of Australian television series
