= Inside Running =

Australian television series

Inside Running is an Australian television series which screened in 1989 on the ABC. The series focused on the professional and personal lives of six barristers. The series opened with a 90 minute episode with the remaining episodes running for 50 minutes.

Inside Running was created by Bill Garner and John Reeves and produced by Ross Dimsey. It was written by Judith Colquhoun, Graeme Farmer, Bill Garner, Alison Nisselle, John Reeves, John Romeril, Jan Sardi, Colin Golvan, Rick Held, Peter Hepworth, John Lord and Alan Maddon. It was directed by Peter Baroutis, Gary Conway, Peter R Dodds, Helen Gaynor, Robert Meillon and Karl Steinberg.

== Cast ==
- Lewis Fiander as Robbie Renard QC
- Geneviève Picot as Penelope Phillips
- Peter Curtin as Dermott O'Brien
- Scott Burgess as Chris Parvo
- Taya Straton as Susan-Elizabeth Wallberg
- Anthony Hawkins as Howard Beasley
- Kirsty Child as Beverly Lamb
- Robert Coleby as Andrew Foster
- Rod Mullinar as Simon Skidmore

== Reception ==
Allan Hughes, a lawyer writing in Australian Financial Review, says the "cases have a genuine ring" and finishes up noting "The stories are good, the bit players excellent and the settings and costumes authentic. This is probably the best Australian legal series yet." Robin Oliver of The Sydney Morning Herald said after the opening episode that "overall, the concept is disappointing." She later wrote "This is a creditable series that often pleases, though it occasionally suffers from transparent plots." The Age's Barbara Hooks gave it a negative review writing "the lack of warmth in the characterisations, story line that failed to make me sit up and take notice, and uninterestingly presented, clumsily resolved cases combined to set back the course of ABC drama once again." The Age's Ross Warneke notes "That frequent lack of character credibility is this show's major problem."

== See also ==
- List of Australian television series
