= Anthony Hawkins =

Australian actor

- Hawkins in 1984 in TV series Special Squad as detective Greg Smith
- Born: 30 September 1932; London, England, United Kingdom
- Died: 23 September 2013 (aged 80); Kyneton, Victoria, Australia
- Education: Guildhall School of Music and Drama
- Occupation: Actor
- Years active: c.1950–2003

Anthony Hawkins (30 September 1932 – 23 September 2013) was an English-born, Australian-based television and stage character actor, he's career in the industry spanned over 50 years and he was best known for his roles as Detective Senior Sergeant Greg Smith in the local police procedural Special Squad (1984) and Frank diAngelo on The Saddle Club. He also had a recurring role in Prisoner as Bob Morris from 1980 to 1982.

Hawkins was born in London and started his career as a police officer, before deciding to become an actor and training at Guildhall School of Music and Drama.

== Career ==
=== Stage and screen ===
Hawkins was part of the cast in the first public performance of Kenneth G. Ross's important Australian play Breaker Morant, presented by the Melbourne Theatre Company at the Athenaeum Theatre, in Melbourne in 1978.

He also appeared in the play The Happy Apple at St Martins Theatre in Melbourne in 1971. He toured the United States with Alfie, played in Birds on the Wing in Melbourne, and Bandwagon in Hobart.

Early TV work was in the United Kingdom and included an appearance as a police constable in the television series No Hiding Place in 1959. He also acted in the Scotland Yard film series of shorts. His TV work in Australia included Ryan and Perryman on Parade, and frequent appearances on police dramas including Matlock Police, Division 4, Homicide and Cop Shop. In 1978, he made his film debut in a minor role in Brian De Palma's The Fury. During the next two years, he starred in the television miniseries Against the Wind and The Last Outlaw and appeared in police series Bluey (1976) before appearing in the soap opera Prisoner. Introduced as Bob Morris, the father of inmate Tracey Morris (Sue Devine), he eventually became a recurring character after the on-screen marriage of Bob Morris to Meg Jackson (Elspeth Ballantyne). He stayed with the series on an irregular basis until 1982, when he was written out entirely. That same year he made a cameo appearance with a number of his fellow Prisoner co-stars in the film Kitty and the Bagman.

He made a guest appearance in Carson's Law, and appeared in the films Phar Lap and Strikebound before joining the cast of Special Squad as Greg Smith, a role he played from 1984 to 1985. Playing a supporting role as Allenby in the 1987 film The Lighthorsemen, during the late 1980s he also made appearances on The Flying Doctors, Inside Running and the 1989 television movie Darlings of the Gods which featured cameo appearances of several other former Prisoner co-stars.

During the early 1990s, he appeared on Kelly, Bony and The Damnation of Harvey McHugh as well as in police dramas Janus and Mercury. His late career included recurring roles in Ocean Girl, Tales of the South Seas and, on the popular Australian children's TV series The Saddle Club.

== Filmography ==
=== Film ===
Year	Title	Role	Type
1977	Raw Deal	Colonel	Feature film
1977	Looking for Mr Goodbar	Chuck	Feature film
1978	The Fury	Chase #1 Shotgun	Feature film
1982	Lookin' to Get Out	Bernie's Assistant	Film
1982	A Shifting Dreaming	Police Commissioner J.C. Cawood	TV movie
1982	Kitty and the Bagman	Simon Mornington	Feature film
1983	Phar Lap		Feature film
1984	Strikebound	Police Sergeant	Feature film
1985	I Live with Me Dad	Major Briggs	Feature film
1986	Body Business	Steve	TV movie
1987	The Lighthorsemen	Allenby	Feature film
1989	Darlings of the Gods	Cecil Tennant	TV movie
2013	The American Bickman Burger	Voiceover	Short film

=== Television ===
Year	Title	Role	Type
1959	BBC Sunday Night Theatre		TV series, 1 episode
1959	The Case Before You	Police Sergeant	TV series, 1 episode
1959	The Moonstone		TV series, 1 episode
1959	No Hiding Place	Police Constable	TV series
1960	The Army Game		TV series, 1 episode
1960	Scotland Yard	Detective Sergeant Halton	Short film series, 1 episode
1972	Perryman on Parade		TV series
1973	Ryan	Adler	TV series, 1 episode
1971-75	Division 4	Andrew Manners / Sydney Martin / Tim Freer / Dr Bob Whitfield	TV series, 5 episodes
1973-75	Matlock Police	Pearce / Thorpe	TV series, 2 episodes
1975	Homicide	John Masters / Jack Peters / Gerald Rivers	TV series, 3 episodes
1976	Power Without Glory	Detective Roberts	TV miniseries, 1 episode
1977	Bluey	David Andrews	TV series, 1 episode
1978	Against the Wind	Surgeon Balmain	TV miniseries, 1 episode
1978	The Sullivans	Sergeant	TV series, 4 episodes
1978-79	Cop Shop	Mr Young / Health Inspector / Leonard Fishman / Chadwick	TV series, 5 episodes
1979	Skyways	Mr Salter	TV series, 1 episode
1980	Water Under the Bridge	Mason	TV miniseries, 2 episodes
1980	The Last Outlaw	Superintendent Hare	TV miniseries, 4 episodes
1980-82	Prisoner	Bob Morris / Detective Sergeant Little	TV series, 36 episodes
1982	Winner of the Sun	Goodman	TV miniseries, 1 episode
1982	Winner Takes All		TV miniseries, 10 episodes
1983	Carson's Law	Charlie Miller	TV series, 1 episode
1984	Waterfront	Sir William McPherson	TV miniseries, 3 episodes
1984	Eureka Stockade	Dr Stewart	TV miniseries, 1 episode
1984	Infinity Limited	Detective Sergeant Strapp	TV series, 1 episode
1984-85	Special Squad	Detective Senior Sergeant Greg Smith	TV series, 40 episodes
1986	Prime Time	Harry Jones	TV series, 1 episode
1987-90	The Flying Doctors	Detective Bennett / Rex Dermody	TV series, 2 episodes
1989	Inside Running		TV series
1989	The Magistrate	Douglas Shaw	TV miniseries, 4 episodes
1990	All the Rivers Run II	Melville	TV miniseries, 2 episodes
1991	The Great Air Race (aka Half a World Away)	Thomas Perrin	TV miniseries, 2 episodes
1991-92	Kelly	Mike Patterson	TV series, 26 episodes
1992	Bony	Evan Baxter	TV series, 1 episode
1994	Janus	Justice Zamel	TV series, 2 episodes
1994	The Damnation of Harvey McHugh	Sapersteen	TV miniseries, 1 episode
1994-99	Blue Heelers	Frank Williams / Dr Quentin Morris / Bernie Granger	TV series, 3 episodes
1995	Snowy River	Major Sutcliffe	TV series, 1 episode
1995-97	Ocean Girl	Searcher #1 / Male Elder	TV series, 5 episodes
1996	Mercury	Hamish Godbold	TV miniseries, 2 episodes
1998-2000	Tales of the South Seas	Bishop	TV miniseries, 2 episodes
2001-02	Cybergirl	McMurtrie	TV series, 11 episodes
2001-03	The Saddle Club	Frank diAngelo	TV series, 7 episodes
2002	Marshall Law	Judge Green	TV miniseries, 5 episodes

== Theatre ==
Year	Title	Role	Company / Venue
	Oliver Twist		
	The Cigarette Girl		
	Alfie		U.S. tour
1971	Bandwagon		Princess Theatre, Launceston & Theatre Royal, Hobart
1971	The Happy Apple		St Martins Theatre
	The Patrick Pearse Motel		St Martins Theatre
1972	Saiad Days		St Martins Theatre
1972	Birds on the Wing	Waiter	St Martins Theatre
1972	Dangerous Corner		Theatre 62
1973	A Celebration of the Life and Vision of Pierre Teilhard de Chardin		Australian Council for the Arts at Dallas Brooks Hall
1973	A Voyage Round My Father		Comedy Theatre, Melbourne, University of NSW
	No Sex Please, We're British		Sydney & Melbourne
1974	Ice Age		Theatre 62 at Prince Alfred College Hall, South Australia for Adelaide Festival of Arts
1974	The Guardsman		Theatre 62 at Port Lincoln Civic Hall
1974	Dangerous Corner		Theatre 62
1975	Hamlet		Monash University
1976	More Canterbury Tales		Her Majesty's Theatre, Melbourne
1977	The Merchant of Venice		Melbourne Theatre Company at Athenaeum Theatre
1977	Desire Under the Elms		Melbourne Theatre Company at Athenaeum Theatre
1978	Breaker Morant	Third Interrogator; Mr. Robinson; Officer; Colonel Hamilton	Melbourne Theatre Company at Athenaeum Theatre
1978	The Playboy of the Western World		Melbourne Theatre Company at Athenaeum Theatre
1978	Under Milk Wood		Melbourne Theatre Company at Athenaeum Theatre
1978	The Resistible Rise of Arturo Ui	Giri	Melbourne Theatre Company at Athenaeum Theatre & University of Melbourne
1978	Arsenic and Old Lace	Teddy Brewster	Melbourne Theatre Company at Athenaeum Theatre
1979	Journey's End		Melbourne Theatre Company at Athenaeum Theatre
1979	Macbeth		Melbourne Theatre Company at Athenaeum Theatre
1979	Arms and the Man		Melbourne Theatre Company at Athenaeum Theatre
1979	Uncle Vanya		Melbourne Theatre Company at Athenaeum Theatre
1979	The Rivals		Melbourne Theatre Company at Athenaeum Theatre
1980	The Jail Diary of Albie Sachs		Melbourne Theatre Company at Athenaeum Theatre
1980	Bent	Freddie	Melbourne Theatre Company at Russell Street Theatre
1980	The Man Who Came to Dinner		Melbourne Theatre Company at Athenaeum Theatre
1981	The Man from Mukinupin		Russell Street Theatre
1981	A Man for All Seasons	The Duke	Melbourne Theatre Company at Athenaeum Theatre
1981	The Good Person of Setzuan		Melbourne Theatre Company at Athenaeum Theatre
1987	Count Dracula	Count Dracula	Royal Queensland Theatre Company at Suncorp Theatre, Brisbane
1992	Vladimir's Carrot		University of Adelaide
1992	Much Ado About Nothing		University of Adelaide
1993	The Temple		Playbox Theatre Company at Merlyn Theatre, West Gippsland Arts Centre & Monash University
1994	The Tempest		Wills Court, Adelaide
1994	Lenin / America / Wake		University of Adelaide
1996	The Comedy of Errors	Antipholus of Syracuse	University of Adelaide & Union Hall, Adelaide
2005	Urinetown the Musical		Bondi Pavilion

== Death ==
Anthony Hawkins died from cancer on 23 September 2013, aged 80.
