= Mercury (TV series) =

Australian TV series

- Country of origin: Australia

Production
- Executive producer: Sue Masters
- Producer: Stephen Corvini

Original release
- Network: ABC
- Release: 2 May 1996 – 25 July 2005

Mercury is a 1996 Australian television series about the editors and reporters of the Sunday Mercury, a fictional Melbourne weekly paper. The series is notable for featuring Geoffrey Rush in a lead role, and originally aired on ABC for a single series of 13 hour-long episodes.

== Cast ==
- Geoffrey Rush as Bill Wyatt
- Victoria Longley as Georgi Singer
- Pamela Rabe as Clare Banister
- David Roberts as Dave ‘Gibbo’ Gibson
- Nicholas Hammond as Jack Koper
- Jason Clarke as Nathan Cohen
- Marta Dusseldorp as Lily-Ann Venables
- Heather Mitchell as Erica Boyer
- Alan Fletcher as Snow Dockerty
- Robin Ramsay as Simon Hayes
- John Flaus as Chocko
- Robert Grubb as Ritchie Munro
- Deidre Rubenstein as Steffi Petrakis
- Anthony Hawkins
- Reg Gorman as Bruce Cartwright
- Michael Veitch as Rocco Kostas
- Susan Lyons as Nell Roberts
