= Camera Script =

Camera Script was an anthology series of 5 episodes screened by the ABC in 1987. A creative writing contest for under 25s created by the Australian Young Writers Project selected five scripts from 5000 entries. Each of these scripts were turned into half hour dramas and were broadcast over five days starting on Monday 5 April

== Episodes ==
1. "Elliot Loves Diana" by Andrew Dal-Bosco
2. "Steve's Falcon" by George Evatt
3. "Come Summer" by Kathie Armstrong
4. "Ta Ta Fer Now" by Michaeley O'Brien
5. "Second Star On The Right" by Chris Hubbard

== Cast ==
- Gumpy Phillips - Elliot (1)
- Taya Straton - Diana (1)
- Jodie Yemm - Gina (3)
- Samantha Bews - May (3)
- Damon Herriman (5)
- Bunny Brooke (5)
- Judith McGrath (5)

== Crew ==
- Peter Dodds - director, producer (1,5)
- Claire Brunner - director, producer (4)
- Dalmazio Babare - score (1–5)
