= Kelly (Australian TV series) =

- Directed by: Mark Defriest; Chris Langman; Brendan Maher; Paul Moloney; Mike Smith
- Starring: Charmaine Gorman; Alexander Kemp; Gil Tucker; Ailsa Piper; Katy Brinson; Anthony Hawkins; Matthew Ketteringham; Joseph Spano
- Composers: Garry McDonald; Laurie Stone
- Country of origin: Australia
- Original language: English
- No. of seasons: 2
- No. of episodes: 26

Production
- Executive producer: Jonathan M. Shiff
- Cinematography: Brett Anderson
- Editors: Ray Daley; Philip Watts
- Running time: 30 minutes
- Production companies: Westbridge Entertainment; Film Victoria; Australian Film Finance Corporation

Original release
- Network: Network Ten
- Release: 10 August 1991 – 5 December 1992

Kelly is an Australian children's television series that was broadcast on Network Ten from 1991 to 1992. The series was produced by Westbridge Entertainment and featured the adventures of a former police dog called Kelly. It was considered Australia's answer to Lassie and The Littlest Hobo.

== Cast ==
- Charmaine Gorman as Jo Patterson
- Alexander Kemp as Danny Foster
- Gil Tucker as Frank Patterson
- Ailsa Piper as Maggie Patterson
- Katy Brinson as Dr. Robyn Foster
- Anthony Hawkins as Mike Patterson
- Matthew Ketteringham as Chris Patterson
- Joseph Spano as Brian Horton
- Simon Grey as Robbo
- Mat Lyons as Dino
- Orion Erickson as Flattop
- Lois Collinder
- Anne Phelan as Rosie
- Dan Falzon as Paul
- Pepe Trevor as Alice

=== Guests ===
- Brett Swain as Bert / Ronnie (2 episodes)
- Cameron Nugent as Richard Langers / Race Announcer (4 episodes)
- Daniel Pollock as Dognapper (1 episode)
- Louise Siversen as Glennis (1 episode)
- Reg Gorman as Fireman

== Episodes ==
=== Season 1 (1991) ===
No. overall	No. in season	Title	Directed by	Written by	Original release date	Prod. code
1	1	"Between Life and Death"	Unknown	Unknown	10 August 1991	TBA
2	2	"Rescue from Danger"	Chris Langman	David Phillips	17 August 1991	TBA
3	3	"The Bird Thieves"	Mark DeFriest	Andrew Kennedy	24 August 1991	TBA
4	4	"The Accident"	Unknown	Unknown	31 August 1991	TBA
5	5	"Friday the 13th"	Unknown	Unknown	7 September 1991	TBA
6	6	"The Fire"	Unknown	Unknown	14 September 1991	TBA
7	7	"Parting"	Unknown	Unknown	21 September 1991	TBA
8	8	"A Friend in Need"	Chris Langman	Andrew Kennedy	28 September 1991	TBA
9	9	"A Quiet Weekend in the Country"	Brendan Maher	Shane Brennan	5 October 1991	TBA
10	10	"Fortunes and Feathers"	Brendan Maher	Peter Hepworth	12 October 1991	TBA
11	11	"The Settler"	Unknown	Unknown	19 October 1991	TBA
12	12	"The Tasmanian Tiger"	Unknown	Unknown	26 October 1991	TBA
13	13	"Just Call Out My Name"	Unknown	Unknown	2 November 1991	TBA

=== Season 2 (1992) ===
No. overall	No. in season	Title	Directed by	Written by	Original release date	Prod. code
14	1	"Hook, Line and Sinker"	Chris Langman	David Phillips	12 September 1992	TBA
15	2	"If You Need a Friend"	Unknown	Unknown	19 September 1992	TBA
16	3	"Gone Missing"	Unknown	Unknown	26 September 1992	TBA
17	4	"The Four O'Clock Ghost"	Unknown	Unknown	3 October 1992	TBA
18	5	"If Dreams Came True"	Unknown	Unknown	10 October 1992	TBA
19	6	"Making Waves"	Unknown	Unknown	17 October 1992	TBA
20	7	"Three of a Kind"	Unknown	Unknown	24 October 1992	TBA
21	8	"Off the Rails"	Unknown	Unknown	31 October 1992	TBA
22	9	"A Very Good Sign"	Unknown	Unknown	7 November 1992	TBA
23	10	"Running with the Pack"	Unknown	Unknown	14 November 1992	TBA
24	11	"The Accused"	Unknown	Unknown	21 November 1992	TBA
25	12	"The Fugitives"	Unknown	Unknown	28 November 1992	TBA
26	13	"Wedding Bells"	Unknown	Unknown	5 December 1992	TBA
