= Breaking Through (1990 film) =

1990 film

- Directed by: Jackie McKimmie
- Written by: Nick Enright
- Produced by: Richard Mason
- Starring: Deidre Rubenstein; Tony Barry; Noni Hazlehurst
- Cinematography: Steve Mason
- Music by: Alistair Spence
- Release date: 1990
- Running time: 55 minutes
- Country: Australia
- Language: English

Breaking Through is a 1990 Australian docudrama TV film about Cathy Ann Matthews (a pseudonym). It tells her story of how when in her 40s she started experiencing memories of being abused as a child. It is based on he book of the same name.

== Cast ==
- Deidre Rubenstein - Ann
- Tony Barry - Rob, Ann's husband
- Noni Hazlehurst - Therapist
- Julie Hamilton - Clare, Ann's sister
- Alice Ansara - Young Ann
- Cathy Ann Mathews - self
- Gabrielle Mason - Sarah, Ann's daughter
- Hugh Keays-Byrne

== Reception ==
John Mangan of The Age wrote "the documentary is all the more powerful for his understated approach." Barbara Hooks, also of The Age, says "'Breaking Through is a powerful, unremitting film. As documentary, it is distinguished by the candor of its content and the creativity of its delivery. And as drama it is involving, moving and ultimately life affirming."
