= Judith McGrath =

Australian actress (1947–2017)

- Judith McGrath as Colleen Powell in Prisoner
- Born: 21 April 1947; Brisbane, Queensland, Australia
- Died: 20 October 2017 (aged 70); Brisbane, Queensland, Australia
- Other name: Judy McGrath
- Occupation: Actress
- Years active: 1967–2012
- Notable work: Prisoner (1979–1984); A Country Practice (1992–1993); All Saints (1998–2009); Round the Twist

Judith McGrath (21 April 1947 – 20 October 2017) was an Australian actress. She was known for her roles as Colleen Powell in Prisoner, Matron Gribble in Round the Twist, Bernice Hudson in A Country Practice, and Yvonne 'Von' Ryan in All Saints.

== Early life ==
Born in Brisbane, McGrath realised she wanted to be an actor from an early age. She began taking drama classes at Brisbane's Twelfth Night Theatre. She also took ballet and speech and elocution lessons.

== Career ==
McGrath began her professional acting career in theatre restaurants in Brisbane. She also had an early film role in 1969 film Age of Consent, playing the role of Grace.

In her twenties, McGrath relocated to London, where she worked in production for BBC radio's international news services and studied mine, dance and drama. After three years, she returned to Brisbane, rejoining Twelfth Night Theatre for 12 months. She then moved to Melbourne where she appeared extensively in theatre, including productions for Melbourne Theatre Company and Playbox Theatre Company. and appeared in Skyways and Young Ramsay.

McGrath was known for playing characters with a dry, often sarcastic wit. She was best known to international audiences for her role in the cult Network Ten soap opera Prisoner as fair-minded but sarcastic Deputy Governor Colleen 'Poface' Powell. Initially a minor character, appearing in 12 episodes in the first two series (1979–1980), she became a permanent cast member in 1981 and went on to appear in a total of 263 episodes. She chose to leave the series, her farewell episode airing in May 1984, during the show's sixth season.

After leaving Prisoner, McGrath appeared in guest roles in Special Squad, Neighbours (1985) and The Flying Doctors (1986; 1988) and 1986 miniseries Sword of Honour. In 1989, she appeared in the first series of the children's comedy series Round The Twist in 1989, playing Matron Cecilia Gribble (the wife of Frankie J. Holden’s character).

McGrath went on to become a regular cast member on A Country Practice, playing hippie Bernice Hudson from 1992 until 1993. Not long afterwards, the series was axed by the Seven Network, and McGrath returned for the final episode.

After a role in ABC drama Police Rescue, McGrath joined the cast of medical drama series All Saints on its debut in 1998, where she became known for playing the long-running role of nurse Yvonne 'Von' Ryan, opposite co-star Georgie Parker. She was the only original cast member to stay with the series until its conclusion in late 2009. The role saw her nominated for a Logie Award.

McGrath also starred in anthology series Naked: Stories of Men in 1996. Her final television role was as a counsellor in the series Winners & Losers.

== Death ==
McGrath died in Brisbane at the age of 70 on 20 October 2017.

== Filmography ==
=== Film ===
Year	Title	Role	Type
1969	Age of Consent	Brisbane Girl – Grace (as Judy McGrath)	Feature film
1986	Backstage	Hotel Receptionist	Feature film
2005	Fink	Centrelink Woman	Feature film
2010	Scone Wars	Mavis Hepstead	Film short

=== Television ===
Year	Title	Role	Notes
1977	Bluey	Mrs. Thompson	Season 1, episode 22
1977, 1980	Young Ramsay	Ethel Dean; Rosemary Billings	Season 1, episode 8 Season 2, episode 5
1978–1980	Cop Shop	Mrs. Bond	Season 1, episode 23
1978–1980	Cop Shop	Leila Foley	Season 2, episode 22
1978–1980	Cop Shop	Jane Hardy	Season 2–3, 4 episodes, recurring role
1978–1980	Cop Shop	Eve Fleming	Season 3, episodes 59 & 60
1978	The Sullivans	Miss Harvey	4 episodes, recurring role
1979 - 1981	Skyways	Mrs. Mason	2 episodes
1979 - 1981	Skyways	Lauren Bates	1 episode
1979 - 1981	Skyways	Dr. Mendelsohn	2 episodes
1979 - 1981	Skyways	Zoe Lawrence	1 episode
1979–1984	Prisoner	Colleen Powell	Seasons 1–3, 31 episodes, recurring role Seasons 3–6, 232 episodes, main role (Note: Played a recurring role in Prisoner from Season 1, episode 48, until Season 3, episode 59. From Season 3, episode 60, she was upgraded to a main character)
1984	Special Squad	June Holgate	Season 1, episode 26
1985	Neighbours	Margaret Haywood	Season 1, episodes 67 & 68
1986	Sword of Honour	Dietician	Miniseries, episode 4
1986, 1988	The Flying Doctors	Cynthia Cumberland-Brown	Season 1, episode 18
1986, 1988	The Flying Doctors	Caroline Longley	Season 3, episode 22
1987	Willing and Abel		Season 1
1987	Camera Script		Episode: "Second Star on the Right"
1989	Round the Twist	Matron Gribble	Season 1, 9 episodes, main role
1992–1993	A Country Practice	Bernice Hudson	Seasons 12–13, 149 episodes, main role
1995	Police Rescue	Hazel	Season 4, episode 3
1996	Naked: Stories of Men	Margaret	Season 1, episode 3, main role
1998–2009	All Saints	Yvonne 'Von' Ryan	Seasons 1–12, 493 episodes, main role
2011–2012	Winners & Losers	Maria Crawley	Seasons 1–2, 3 episodes, recurring role

== Theatre ==
Year	Title	Role	Type
1974	Rumpelstiltskin		Twelfth Night Theatre, Brisbane
1974	Red, White and Boogie		Twelfth Night Theatre, Brisbane
1976	Summer and Smoke	Alma	Twelfth Night Theatre, Brisbane
1976	What the Butler Saw	Mrs Prentice	Monash University, Melbourne
1977	Romeo and Juliet	Nurse	Monash University, Melbourne
1977	The Cherry Orchard	Charlotta	Monash University, Melbourne
1977	The Crucible	Tituba	Monash University, Melbourne
1977	Stephany: Revival		La Mama, Melbourne
1977	The Abdication		La Mama, Melbourne
1978	Electra	Chorus	Melbourne Athenaeum with MTC
1978	The Playboy of the Western World	Susan Brady	Melbourne Athenaeum with MTC
1978–1979	Once a Catholic	Mother Thomas Aquinas	Russell St Theatre, Melbourne
1980	Outside Edge	Ginnie	Playbox Theatre, Melbourne
1980	Wings	Amy	Playbox Theatre, Melbourne
1985	Blue Window	Alice	St Martins Theatre, Melbourne with Playbox Theatre
1985	Season's Greetings	Phyllis	Russell St Theatre, Melbourne with MTC
1986	The Norman Conquests		Russell St Theatre, Melbourne with MTC
1987	Round and Round the Garden		Russell St Theatre, Melbourne with MTC
1987	What the Butler Saw	Mrs Prentice	Russell St Theatre, Melbourne, Melbourne Athenaeum with MTC
1987	Are You Lonesome Tonight?		Q Theatre, Penrith & North Qld tour with New Moon Theatre Company
1987	Away		Townsville Civic Hall with New Moon Theatre Company
1988	Seven Little Australians: The Musical	Martha / Miss Jolly	Theatre Royal, Hobart, Comedy Theatre, Melbourne, Adelaide Festival Centre
1988	These Days	Director	Melbourne Athenaeum with Melbourne Ensemble Theatre
1989	See How They Run	Miss Skillon	Playhouse, Melbourne with MTC
1990	A Sporting Chance	Director	Fairfax Studio, Melbourne
1990–1991	Lend Me a Tenor	Julia, Chairman of the Opera Guild	His Majesty's Theatre, Perth, Theatre Royal Sydney, Canberra Theatre
1994	A Flea in Her Ear	Olympe	Playhouse, Melbourne with MTC
1996	A Cheery Soul	Matron / Mrs Pinfold / Berys	Playhouse, Melbourne with MTC
1996	The Tragedy of Julius Caesar	Calphurnia / TV Journalist	Playhouse, Melbourne with MTC
1996	The One Day of the Year		Q Theatre, Penrith
1997	The Comedy of Errors	An Abbess	Sydney Opera House, Playhouse, Melbourne with STC / MTC
1997	After Magritte / The Real Inspector Hound	Thelma / Mrs Drudge	Playhouse, Melbourne with MTC
2004	Lovers at Versailles	Clara	Sydney Opera House with Ensemble Theatre
2005	Love Letters	Melissa Gardner	NIDA Parade Theatre, Sydney
2013	The Secret River	Mrs Herring	Sydney Theatre, Playhouse, Canberra, His Majesty's Theatre, Perth with STC

== Radio ==
Year	Title	Role	Type
1979	Crying in the Night		ABC Radio, Melbourne
