= Keith Smith (writer) =

Australian broadcaster & author (1917–2011)

- Born: Edward Keith Smith; 4 September 1917; Melbourne, Australia
- Died: 2 June 2011 (aged 93); Sydney, Australia
- Occupations: Radio broadcaster; author

Keith Smith (4 September 1917 – 2 June 2011) was an Australian broadcaster, radio and television personality, and writer.

== Biography ==
Edward Keith Smith was born in Melbourne in 1917. He was taken out of school at age 13, as his parents could not afford to keep him there. He went to work in a foundry, doing painful and exhausting work, before being offered an apprenticeship as a signwriter. He started selling his comedy sketches to radio stations and appearing in radio plays for the ABC. He served in New Guinea and the Solomon Islands during World War II. On discharge in 1946, he moved to Sydney, where his career as an actor and writer took off.

Smith's most popular program was The Pied Piper (initially radio, later on television), in which he conducted candid interviews with children. He also devised and wrote (with veteran radio writer George Foster) the scripts for the 13 episodes of the television series Mrs. Finnegan, which appeared on Sydney channel ATN 7 from 1970 to 1971.

He published the parenting book How to Get Closer to Your Children in 1985 and two volumes of Supernatural!: Australian Encounters in 1991 and 1993, about ghost sightings in Australia. He also wrote the social history work Australian Battlers Remember: The Great Depression, published in 2003.

Smith lived his last years as a recluse. He died in Sydney on 2 June 2011, aged 93.

== Writing ==
- The Bear with Bad Eyes; illustrated by Jiri Tibor Novak; Little Lilyfield, 1987
- How to Get Closer to Your Children; Waratah Press, 1985
- The Migrant Mouse; illustrated by Bruno Jean Grasswill; Little Lilyfield, 1988
- The Palace of Signs : Memories of Hard Times and High Times in the Great Depression; Sun, 1991
- World War II wasn't All Hell; Hutchinson Australia, 1988
- The Pig that was Different; illustrated by Mary Ferguson; Bow Press in association with Hutchinson Australia, 1988
- Keith Smith's Riddle Book from Outer Space; Rigby, c. 1964
- A Word from Children; Rigby, 1960
- Ogf: Being the Private Papers of George Cockburn, Bus Conductor, a Resident of Hurstfield, a Suburb of Sydney, Australia; Ure Smith, 1965
- Australian Battlers Remember: the Great Depression; Random House, c. 2003
- The Pied Piper: Keith Smith's Riddle Book for Children; Rigby, 1960
- T.V. Jokes for Children; Rigby, 1972
- T.V. Jokes for Children 2; Rigby, 1972
- Keith Smith's T-V Picture Puzzle Book. No. 1; Rigby, 1973
- Keith Smith's T-V Picture Puzzle Book. No. 2; Rigby, 1973
- Keith Smith's Dum Dora Jokes, illustrations by Eva Wickenberg; Rigby, 1977
- TV Cook Book for Kids; Rigby, 1972
- Keith Smith's Knock! Knock! Jokes; illustrations by Eva Wickenberg; Rigby, 1977
- Keith Smith's Riddle Round Up; illustrations by Eva Wickenberg; Rigby, 1977
- Supernatural!: Australian Encounters; Pan, 1991
- Supernatural No. 2: More Australian Encounters; Pan MacMillan, 1993
- The Time of their Lives!: Remembering Yesterday's Australia; Allen & Unwin, 1993
