= Penny Ramsey =

Australian actress (1947–2009)

- Born: Penelope Ward Ramsey; 25 June 1947; Adelaide, South Australia, Australia
- Died: 11 February 2009 (aged 61); St Andrews, Victoria, Australia
- Occupation: Actress
- Years active: 1968–1986
- Partner: Rod Mullinar

Penelope Ward Ramsey (25 June 1947 – 11 February 2009) was an Australian character actress.

== Biography ==
Ramsay's her work is featured in over three decades of classic Australian TV series. Her credits include Prisoner, The Bush Gang, Matlock Police, Homicide, Number 96, The Box, Division 4, Mrs. Finnegan, Riptide and Anything Goes.

Her partner was the English-Australian actor Rod Mullinar, she was the daughter of Cuthbert Ramsey and actress Lois Ramsey.

Ramsey died of unspecified cancer in St. Andrews, Victoria on 11 February, 2009, aged 61.

== Filmography ==
=== Film ===
Year	Title	Role	Type
1971	3 to Go	Heather (segment "Judy")	Feature film

=== Television ===
Year	Title	Role	Type
1966	Crackerjack	Presenter	TV series
1966–73	Homicide	Guest roles: Sally Reid / Glenda Wilson / Diane Mason	TV series, 4 episodes
1968	Anything Goes	Herself	TV series
1969	Riptide	Guest role: Sue Sherman	TV series, 1 episode 22 "Hagan's Kingdom"
1970–71	Mrs. Finnegan	Regular role: Fay Smith	TV series, 13 episodes
1971–75	Matlock Police	Guest roles: Macy Lander / Betty Young / Bernice Reid / Judy Bennett	TV series, 4 episodes
1972	Number 96	Recurring Guest role: Babs	TV series, 3 episodes
1972	Division 4	Guest roles: Judy / Kay	TV series, 2 episodes
1976–77	The Box	Recurring role	TV series
1977	Bluey	Guest role: Belinda Dempsey	TV series, 1 episode 17: "Star Turn"
1979–80	Cop Shop	Guest roles: Mrs. Young / Beverly Nash	TV series, 3 episodes
1979; 1986	Prisoner	Recurring role: Leila Fletcher	TV series, 15 episodes
1980	Skyways	Guest role: Judy Pinnington	TV series, 1 episode
1981	The Bush Gang	Regular role: Mrs. Marsh	TV series, 5 episodes
1986	Prisoner	Recurring role: Amy Ryan	TV series, 13 episodes
