= Taya Straton =

Australian actress (1960–1996)

- Born: 23 February 1960
- Died: 26 February 1996 (aged 36); Australia
- Occupation: Actress
- Known for: Prisoner as Rose "Spider" Simpson

Taya Straton (23 February 1960 – 26 February 1996) was an Australian actress, who remains best known for her roles in serials and soap opera including Prisoner in 1986, during the final season as Rose "Spider" Simpson.

She played a main role in the ABC's Inside Running in 1989. On stage she featured in The Pub Show (Esplanade Hotel, 1985), Not Waving (Junction Club, 1990) and The Hundred Year Ambush (Fairfax Studio, 1990) She also had smaller TV roles in A Country Practice and The Flying Doctors.

She died by suicide on 26 February 1996, three days after her 36th birthday.

== Filmography ==
=== Film ===
Year	Title	Role	Notes
1987	Slate, Wyn & Me	Pippa	
1990	Aya	Tina	

=== Television ===
Year	Title	Role	Notes
1986	The Flying Doctors	Margie Cooke	Episode: "Do You Read Me?"
1986	Prisoner	Rose "Spider" Simpson	38 episodes
1987	Elliott Loves Diana	Diana	Television short
1988	Rafferty's Rules	Amanda Kurtz	Episode: "Freedom"
1988	Always Afternoon	Alisa	4 episodes
1988	A Country Practice	Amanda Fowler	2 episodes "Give Me A Break" parts 1 & 2
1989	Inside Running	Susan-Elizabeth Wallberg	19 episodes
1992	Bony	Elizabeth	Episode: "Under the Influence"
1995	Janus	Sharon Clarke	Episode: "Intent to Permanently Deprive"
