= Peter Hayes (actor) =

- Born: Peter Hayes; 28 September 1957 (age 68); Melbourne, Australia
- Occupation: Actor
- Years active: 1985–

Peter Hayes (born 28 September 1957) is a Sydney-based, British trained, Australian television, film and theatre actor and director. He is perhaps best known for the role of Dr. Steven Ryan in the long running Australian soap opera, Prisoner.

== Acting career ==
Hayes started acting while young with the Port Moresby Players in 1968 in a production of 1066. Wanting to become a professional actor he went on to train from 1982 to 1984 at the Webber Douglas Academy in London, United Kingdom. Hayes also holds a Bachelor Arts (Honours) from the University of Melbourne.

=== Television ===
Hayes appeared in Australian soap opera Prisoner as young Doctor and undercover handyman, Steve Ryan in 1985–1986. Hayes has also appeared in Rafferty's Rules as Peter Booth (1986). He has also appeared in Westbrook as Golledge, Whitlam: The Power and the Passion (2013), Home and Away as Alan Willis, Farscape and A Difficult Woman as Reporter (1998)

=== Film ===
Hayes has appeared in films including:

- 2002 The Junction Boys – Adult Johnny, Fox Production Services
- 2000 Games of the I – Jerry Clone, Dada Productions, Director, Peter Buckmaster & Ralph Daymen
- 1998 15 Amore – William, Mtxm Movies, Director, Maurice Murphy
- 1997 The Venus Factory – Mr Hale, Tomahawk Pictures, Director, Glenn Fraser

=== Theatre ===
Hayes has had a long career in the theatre. He has appeared in:

- 2018 Elephant Man directed by Debbie Smith at PACT
- 2017 Romeo and Juliet Bondi Pavilion Amphitheatre
- 2013 Friday by Daniela Giorgi at The Old Fitzroy
- 2012 Swings adapted from Schnitzler's La Ronde and directed by Peter Hayes
- 2010 Through These Lines written & directed by Cheryl Ward at Headland Park
- 2010 Macbeth directed by Chris Hurrell at Darlinghurst Theatre
- 2004 Squirrels by David Mamet – Shane Morgan directed at the Cat & Fiddle
- 2004 King Lear Riverside Parramatta & Bondi Pavilion
- 2004 The Tempest Globe Shakespeare Australia
- 2002 The Merry Wives of Windsor directed by Jeremy Rice at Gunnamatta Park
- 2001 Richard III for Always Working Artists
- 1997 Flying Saucery by Mona Brand – Independent Theatre, North Sydney
- 1991 Abingdon Square Belvoir Street Theatre, Sydney & Malthouse Theatre, Melbourne
- 1990 Provincial Anecdotes directed by Joseph Uchitel at The Lookout Theatre
- 1990 Struth by Mark Swivel – 7 characters, Marion Potts directed at Stables Theatre
- 1989 The Barretts of Wimpole Street directed by John Krummel, Marian Street Theatre
- 1989 Passion Play by Peter Nichols, directed by Noel Ferrier – Playhouse Theatre, Sydney Opera House
- 1987 Romeo and Juliet directed by Mary Hickson in the Old Town Hall for the Darwin Theatre Group
- 1987 The Little Prince for Theatre Nouveau
- 1986 The Late Late Capitalism Show at The Footbridge Theatre, Sydney

== Director ==
Hayes has also directed for the theatre:

- 2017 Romeo and Juliet at Bondi Pavilion Amphitheatre
- 2012 Swings adapted from Schnitzler's La Ronde at TAP
- 2010 The Man Who Fell Off His Bicycle by Glen Hergenhahn at TAP
- 2006 Shakespeare's Timon of Athens at Knox Grammar
- 1997 Roo by Angus Strachan at Café Basilica & La Mama
- 1994 Fireworks – The Fireraisers by Max Frisch & Fire Downunder by Pavel Kahout] at the Crossroads Theatre
- 1993 assistant to Aubrey Mellor on The Beaux Stratagem for Queensland Theatre Company
- 1993 John Osborne's Luther at the Old Sandstone Church
