= Philip Hyde (actor) =

Australian actor

Philip Hyde (born 1957, in Sydney) is an Australian former actor. After graduating the Victorian College of Arts, he became best known for playing the sinister Rodney Adams during the final year's run (1986) of the television series Prisoner. He also appeared in soap opera A Country Practice.

Hyde has also appeared on stage in productions including the Australian and New Zealand tours of Michael Frayn's award-winning comedy Noises Off and Ray Cooney's comedy, Run For Your Wife.

== Filmography ==
Year	Title	Role	Notes
1986	Prisoner	Rodney Adams	58 episodes
1988	A Country Practice	Morrie Rogers	Episode: "False Pretences: Part 2"
1990	Rafferty's Rules	Mick	Episode: "Consciousness Raising"
