= Lois Ramsey =

Australian actress

- Lois Ramsay in her stint as Ettie Parslow in the TV series Prisoner
- Born: Lois June Dickson; 18 June 1922; Adelaide, South Australia, Australia
- Died: 22 January 2016 (aged 93)
- Occupation: Actress
- Years active: 1954–2012
- Known for: Prisoner (TV series); The Box (TV series)
- Spouse: Cuthbert Ward Ramsey
- Children: Penny Ramsey; Stephen Ramsey

Lois June Ramsey (née Dickson; 18 June 1922 – 22 January 2016) also billed as Lois Ramsay, was an Australian actress, best known for her regular roles on television series, she became internationally renowned for her stints in drama Prisoner in two different roles during the series tenure. She often played quirky, eccentric old ladies on television soap operas, she had previously appeared in the local sex and sin drama The Box, based on the television industry.

She was added to the cast of TV series Prisoner after the departure of original star Sheila Florance, with producer's looking for a similar elderly biddy-type character, however she wasn't as successful as her predecessor.

== Career ==
=== The Box and Prisoner ===
Ramsay was a major cast member of the 1970s soap opera The Box as tea lady Mrs. Hopkins, appearing for the entire run of the serial. Ramsey also had two prominent stints in Prisoner. Her first role was as dotty social worker Agnes Forster in 1980. In 1985-1986 Ramsey played elderly prison inmate Ettie Parslow who thought the Second World War was still going on.

=== Television and film roles ===
She had numerous roles in TV soap opera/serials including Crawford Productions serials Homicide, The Sullivans, Cop Shop, as well as Prisoner, A Country Practice, E Street, Home and Away, and Blue Heelers, Always Greener and All Saints and the films Crackerjack and BoyTown.

AFI Award for Best Performance by an Actress in a Guest Role in a Television Drama Series for a performance in the television series Grass Roots.

=== Stage roles ===
Also a stage actress, she was one of the founders of the Flinders Street Revue Company in 1961 and appeared later she appeared in numerous productions with both the Sydney Theatre Company and the Melbourne Theatre Company.

== Personal life ==
Born to Bill and Maud Dickson, she married Cuthbert Ward Ramsey on 25 September 1943. They had two children: writer/director Stephen Ramsey and the late actress Penny Ramsey.

== Filmography ==
=== Film ===
Title	Year	Role	Type
1975	The Box	Mrs. Hopkins	Feature film
1983	Undercover	Landlady	Feature film
1984	One Night Stand	Salvation Army Woman	Feature film
1993	Shotgun Wedding	Voice (as Lois Ramsay)	Feature film
1996	River Street	Edna Davis	Feature film
1996	Roses	Dawn	Short film
1997	Road to Nhill	Carmel	Feature film
1998	Tulip	Margaret	Short film
1999	Fresh Air	Mrs. Beck	Feature film
2002	Crackerjack	Gwen	Feature film
2006	BoyTown	Gran	Feature film
2007	Cool White	Grace	Short film

=== Television ===
Title	Year	Role	Type
1962; 1963	Consider Your Verdict	Recurring Guest role: Marjorie Buxton (as Lois Ramsay)	TV series, 2 episodes
1965	The Mavis Bramston Show	Guest	TV series, 1 episode
1967	Adventures of the Seaspray		TV series, 1 episode
1967-1974	Homicide	Guest roles: Ivy Young / Mrs. Hubble / Mrs. Jones	TV series, 3 episodes
1968	The Battlers		TV series
1969	Riptide	Guest role: Anastasia Burns	TV series, episode 4: "Surprise Surprise"
1970	The Link Men	Guest role: Mother	TV series, 2 episodes: "Somebody's Kid Is Missing", "Mother"
1974-1977	The Box	Regular roles: Mrs. Hopkins / Mrs. Hawker (as Lois Ramsay)	TV series, 197 episodes
1975	Pot of Gold	Guest judge	TV series, 1 episode
1976	The Young Doctors	Recurring Guest role: Winnie Parsons	TV series
1977	Young Ramsay	Guest role: Maisie O'Brien (as Lois Ramsay)	TV series, 1 episode
1977-1978	The Sullivans	Recurring Guest role: Mrs. Patterson	TV series, 3 episodes
1978	Cop Shop	Guest role: Mrs. Blair	TV series, 1 episode
1978	The Mike Walsh Show	Guest (with Judy Nunn)	TV series, 1 episode
1978	The Truckies	Regular role: Dora	TV series, 12 episodes
1980	Prisoner	Recurring role: Agnes Forster	TV series
1981	Air Hawk: Star of the North	Support role: Dorcas (as Lois Ramsay)	TV movie
1981	A Town Like Alice	Recurring role: Mrs. Driver	TV miniseries, 1 episode
1982-1990	A Country Practice	Guest roles: Gladys Carter / Pearl Murray / Irene Sinclair / Nellie Dickinson	TV series, 8 episodes
1983	Carson's Law	Guest role: Mrs. Griffin	TV series, 1 episode
1985	The Harp in the South	Support role: Mrs. Campion	TV miniseries, 3 episodes
1986	Prisoner	Recurring role: Ettie Parslow	TV series
1987	Poor Man's Orange	Support role: Mrs. Campion	TV miniseries, 2 episodes
1987	Willing and Abel	Guest role	TV series, 1 episode
1988	Rafferty's Rules	Guest role: Miss Mitford	TV series, 1 episode
1989	E Street	Recurring role: Lillian Patchett	TV series, 6 episodes
1989; 1993	G.P.	Recurring role: Lily Cartwright	TV series, 3 episodes
1994; 1999	Blue Heelers	Guest role: Nora Sharpe	TV series, 1 episode
1994	Mother and Son	Guest role: Butcher #1 (as Lois Ramsay)	TV series, 1 episode
1997	Heartbreak High	Guest role: Ethel	TV series, 1 episode
1997	An Unexpected Drama: The Making of the Feature film Road to Nhill	Herself - Actress	Video
1999; 2004	All Saints	Guest role: Norma Blunt	TV series, 2 episodes
1999	Water Rats	Guest role: Shirley Martin	TV series, 1 episode
1999	Blue Heelers	Guest role: Eileen Hart	TV series, 1 episode
2000	Above the Law	Recurring role: Flo Price	TV series, 2 episodes
2000	Home and Away	Guest role: Mrs. Trent	TV series, 1 episode
2000	Grass Roots	Guest role: Mrs. Robbins (as Lois Ramsay)	TV series, 1 episode
2001	My Husband My Killer	Support role: Mrs. May Carmichael	TV movie
2001	Always Greener	Guest role: Old Woman	TV series, 1 episode
2004	All Saints	Recurring role: Thelma Franklin	TV series, 3 episodes
2007	BoyTown Confidential	Gran	Video
2012	Rake	Guest role: Dolores	TV series, 1 episode
2015	Studio 10	Herself (with Judy Nunn)	TV series, 1 episode
2015	Judith Lucy Is All Woman	Herself	TV series, 1 episode
