= Margot Knight =

Australian actress

- Born: Sale, Victoria, Australia
- Occupations: Actress; screenwriter
- Years active: 1976-present

Margot Knight is an Australian actress and screenwriter. She had numerous guest roles in TV series and telemovies, but is best known for her stints playing two roles in the highly popular cult series Prisoner (known internationally as Prisoner: Cell Block H); she played inmate Sharon Gilmour in 1980 and junior prison officer Terri Malone in 1985.

== TV roles: Neighbours and Prisoner ==
Knight appeared in Neighbours, playing two different roles Jean Richards in 1986 and Tracey Cox in 1997.

Her Prisoner appearances are notable because in addition to being one of the few cast members to play both a prisoner and a prison warder in the series, both of her roles were as the lesbian love interest to the show's main lesbian character at the time.

Sharon Gilmour was the scheming drug pushing girlfriend of long-term inmate Judy Bryant (Betty Bobbitt) (Judy's long stay in prison actually began because she deliberately had herself imprisoned to be with Sharon), and Terri Malone was a young prison officer who moved in with warder Joan Ferguson (Maggie Kirkpatrick).

In 2021, Knight gave an extensive interview about her time on Prisoner (TV series) with podcast series Talking Prisoner where she discussed at length her time on the show and how she got into screenwriting.

== Screenwriting ==
Knight is also a writer, and between 1990 and 1993, wrote several episodes of Neighbours, including episode 1721 which saw the death of the popular character Todd Landers played by Kristian Schmid. This episode is included on the DVD, Neighbours: Defining Moments.

== Stage roles ==
Knight has also worked on stage plays since 1976. Her live work includes “Underground”, “The World Without Birds”, “Controlled Crying”, and “Richard II”. In November 2011, Knight reunited with other Prisoner cast members for a fundraiser for Audacious Dreaming, to support HIV awareness.

== Filmography ==
Year	Title	Role	Notes
1977	The Sullivans (TV series)	Prostitute	TV series; 1 episode
1979/1981	Cop Shop (TV series)	Girl 1 / Julie Wallace	TV series; 3 episodes
1985	The Fast Lane	Faye	TV series; 1 episode
1980–1985	Prisoner	Sharon Gilmore / Terri Malone	TV series; 52 episodes
1986	Handle with Care	Annette	TV movie
1986	Studio 86		TV series
1987	In Between	Social Worker	TV mini-series
1989	The Flying Doctors (TV series)	Elaine	TV series; 1 episode
1991	Chances	Jennifer Parsons	TV series; 6 episodes
1997	The Adventures of Lano and Woodley	Mitchell's Sister	TV series; 1 episode
1998	Good Guys, Bad Guys	Dr. Lisa Boudine	TV series; 1 episode
1986–1998	Neighbours	Jean Richards/Tracey Cox	TV soap; 23 episodes
1998	Halifax f.p.	Sue Bailey	TV series; 1 episode
1998	State Coroner	Trish Randall	TV series; 1 episode
2000	Something in the Air	Pauline Middlemass	TV series; 2 episodes
2002	The Angel Files	Julia Davis	TV series; 1 episode
2005	Scooter: Secret Agent	Maggie	TV series; 1 episode
1996–2005	Blue Heelers	Mrs Matthews/Stephanie Roberts/Meredith Foster/Ailsa Sutcliff	TV series; 4 episodes
2008	Menzies and Churchill at War	Dame Pattie Menzies	TV movie
2010	Charles Bean's Great War	Effie Bean	TV movie
2014	Winners & Losers	Principal King	TV series; 1 episode
2020	My Wife Died and I'm Starving	Mandy/Margo	TV series; 5 episodes
2021	Talking Prisoner	Self	Podcast series; 1 episode
2022	Bluey	Old Pug (voice)	TV series; 1 episode

=== Film appearances ===
Year	Title	Role	Notes
2023	Insufferable		Short
2018	The Couple Enjoy a Bath		Short
2016	Copycat from Ballarat	Joan	Short
2015	The Dressmaker	Mrs. Wood	
2002	Till Human Voices Wake Us	Dorothy Lewis	
2000	Charm		Short
1982	The Pirate Movie	Sister	

== Screenwriter ==
Year	TItle	Role	Episodes
1990–1993	Neighbours	Writer	15 episodes

== Theatre ==
In 2022, Knight appeared in the theatre production of Death of a Salesman.

Year	Title	Role	Notes	Ref
2024	Death of a Salesman	Linda Loman	Hearth Theatre	
2022	Death of a Salesman	Linda Loman	Hearth Theatre	
2019	Underground	Nancy Wake	Gasworks Theatre	
2015	Wicked Widows		Frankstown Arts Centre	
2008	Controlled Crying	Libby	Seymour Theatre Centre	
