= List of Australian films of 1982 =

== 1982 ==
| Title | Director | Cast | Genre | Notes |
|---|---|---|---|---|
| And / Or = One | Briann Kearney | Kris McQuade, Vincent Gil, Anna West, Bridget Murphy | Drama | IMDb |
| Attack Force Z | Tim Burstall | John Phillip Law, Mel Gibson, Sam Neill, Chris Haywood, John Waters, Chun Ku, Sylvia Chang, O Ti, Lung Shuan | Action / Drama / War | IMDb |
| The Battle of Broken Hill | Robin Levinson | | feature film | |
| The Best of Friends | Michael Robertson | Angela Punch-McGregor, Graeme Blundell, Ruth Cracknell, Serge Lazareff, Sonja Tallis, Mark Lee, Maggie Dence, Les Foxcroft, Graham Rouse, Moya O'Sullivan, Henri Szeps, Deborah Gray | Drama / Romance Feature film | |
| The Black Forest | Paul Williams | | feature film | |
| Breakfast in Paris | John D. Lamond | Barbara Parkins, Rod Mullinar, Jack Lenoir, Elspeth Ballantyne, Graham Stanley, Chris Milne, Jennie Lamond, Jeremy Higgins | Drama / Romance Feature film | IMDb |
| Brothers | Terry Bourke | Chard Hayward, Ivar Kants, Margaret Lawrence, Chris Haywood, Alyson Best, Jennifer Cluff, Joan Bruce, Les Foxcroft, James Elliott, Ken Wayne, Moira Walker, Roger Ward, Ricky May | Drama / Thriller / War Feature film shot in New Zealand | |
| Café of Love | Jinks Dulhunty | Craig Ashley, Mary Lou Stewart | Short | IMDb |
| The Clinic | David Stevens | Chris Haywood, Simon Burke, Gerda Nicolson, Rona McLeod, Suzanne Roylance, Veronica Lang, Pat Evison, Max Bruch, Gabrielle Hartley, Jane Cifton, Ned Lander, Martin Sharman, Tom Travers, Tony Rickards, Mark Little, Betty Bobbitt, Marilyn O'Donnell, Geoff Parry, Lawrence Mah, Paul Keek, Danny Nash, Alan Pentland, Jesse Mogensen, Terrie Sinclair, Evelyn Krape, Simon Thorpe, Alex Menglet, Tracy Harvey, Richard Healy | Comedy Feature film | IMDb |
| Corpse | James Clayden | Ann Eckersley, Christopher Knowles | Avant-Garde | IMDb |
| Crosstalk | Mark Egerton, Keith Salvat | Gary Day, Penny Downie, John Ewart, Brian McDermott, Peter Collingwood, Kim Deacon, Judith Woodroofe, Jill Forster | Sci-Fi / Thriller Feature film | IMDb |
| A Dangerous Summer | Quentin Masters | Tom Skerritt, James Mason, Ian Gilmour, Wendy Hughes, Kim Deacon, Ray Barrett, Guy Doleman, Shane Porteous, Norman Kaye | Drama / Thriller Feature film | |
| The Dark Room | Paul Harmon | Alan Cassell, Anna Maria Monticelli, Svet Kovich, Diana Davidson, Rowena Wallace, Ric Hutton, Oriana Panozzo, Sean Myers, Sally Cooper, Jon Darling, Kate Parker, Hayes Gordon | Drama / Thriller Feature film | IMDb |
| Dead Easy | Bert Deling | Scott Burgess, Rosemary Paul, Tim McKenzie, Joe Martin, Max Phipps, Jack O'Leary, Sandy Gore, Barney Combes, Bobby Noble, Carlotta, Tony Barry | Action / Thriller Feature film | IMDb |
| Dead Kids | Michael Laughlin | | feature film | |
| Desolation Angels | Christopher Fitchett | Kim Trengove, Kerry Mack, Marie O'Loughlin, Monica Maughan, Jay Mannering, Paul Alexander, Nield Schneider, Nico Lathouris, Nick Forster, Louise Howitt, Karen West | Drama / Horror / Thriller Feature film | IMDb aka Fair Game |
| Dot and Santa Claus | Yoram Gross | | | |
| Double Deal | Brian Kavanagh | Louis Jourdan, Angela Punch McGregor, Diane Craig, Warwick Comber, Peter Cummins, Bruce Spence, June Jago, Kerry Walker, Joan Letch, Danee Lindsay, Sean Myers, Robin Cuming, Harold Baigent, Kerry Daniel, Brenda Beddison, Don Bridges | Drama / Thriller Feature film | |
| Duet for Four | Tim Burstall | Michael Preston, Wendy Hughes, Michael Pate, Diane Cilento, Rod Mullinar, Sigrid Thornton, Vanessa Leigh, Warwick Comber, Clare Binney, Arthur Dignam | Drama / Romance Feature film | IMDb |
| Dusty | John Richardson | Bill Kerr, Noel Trevarthen, John Stanton, Carol Burns, Nick Holland, Dan Lynch, Maurie Fields, Reg Gorman, Katie Edwards | Adventure Family Feature film | |
| Early Frost | Terry O'Connor | Diana McLean, Jon Blake, Janet Kingsbury, David Franklin, Joanne Samuel, Danny Adcock, Daniel Cumerford, Kit Taylor, Guy Doleman | Drama / Horror / Thriller Feature film Drama / Horror / Thriller Feature film | IMDb |
| An Exercise in Discipline: Peel | Jane Campion | Tim Pye, Katie Pye | Short | IMDb |
| Far East | John Duigan | Bryan Brown, Helen Morse, John Bell, Sinan Leong, Raina McKeon, Bill Hunter, Henry Duval, John Gaden, John Clayton | Drama / Thriller / War Feature film | IMDb |
| Fighting Back | Michael Caulfield | Lewis Fitz-Gerald, Paul Smith, Kris McQuade, Robyn Nevin, Wynn Roberts, Ben Gabriel, Anne Haddy, Maurie Fields, Caroline Gillmer | Drama Feature film | IMDb |
| Fluteman | Peter Maxwell | John Jarratt, Emil Minty, Aileen Britton, Debra Lawrance, Michael Caton, Patrick Dickson, Peter Gwynne, Sheila Kennelly, Ron Graham, John Ewart | Drama Feature film | IMDb |
| Freedom | Scott Hicks | Jon Blake, Candy Raymond, Jad Capelja, Charles Tingwell, Chris Haywood, Max Cullen, Reg Lye, Paul Sonkkila, Katie Edwards, John Clayton | Action / Adventure / Drama Feature film | IMDb |
| Ginger Meggs | Jonathan Dawson | Garry McDonald, Ross Higgins, Gwen Plumb, Harold Hopkins, Paul Daniel, Coral Kelly, Hugh Keays-Byrne, Harold Hopkins, John Wood, Willie Fennell, Terry Camilleri, Drew Forsythe | Comedy Family Feature film | IMDb |
| Going Down | Haydn Keenan | Tracy Mann, David Argue, Vera Plevnik, Moira MacLaine-Cross, Julie Barry, Richard Moir, Ian Gilmour, Hugh Keays-Byrne, Claudia Karvan, Mercia Deane-Johns, Ralph Cotterill | Drama Feature film | |
| Goodbye Paradise | Carl Schultz | Ray Barrett, Robyn Nevin, Janet Scrivener, Lex Marinos, Paul Chubb, Kate Fitzpatrick, Robert 'Tex' Morton, Guy Doleman, John Clayton, Don Pascoe, Kris McQuade, Frank Gallacher, Ray Marshall, Wallas Eaton, Mark Hembrow, Grant Dodwell | Drama / Thriller / War Feature film | |
| Greetings from Wollongong | Mary Callaghan | Kevin Budgen, Shirley Faulkner, Syd Long | Short | IMDb |
| Heatwave | Phillip Noyce | Judy Davis, Richard Moir, Chris Haywood, Bill Hunter, John Meillon, Anna Jemison, Dennis Miller, John Gregg, Sarah de Teliga, Lynette Curran, Carole Skinner, Frank Gallacher, Gary Waddell, Martin Sacks, Paul Chubb, Mercia Deane-Johns, Joy Smithers | Drama / Mystery / Thriller Feature film | IMDb |
| The Highest Honor | Peter Maxwell, Seiji Maruyama | John Howard, Atsuo Nakamura, Stuart Wilson, | War / Drama Feature film | IMDb aka Southern Cross |
| Journey to the End of Night | Bill Tammer | | Documentary | IMDb |
| Kitty and the Bagman | Donald Crombie | Liddy Clark, John Stanton, Val Lehman, David Bradshaw, Gerard Maguire, John Ewart, Colette Mann, Paul Chubb, Kylie Foster, Ted Hepple, Danny Adcock, Reg Evans | Crime / Drama Feature film | IMDb |
| Lady Stay Dead | Terry Bourke | | feature film | |
| The Little Feller | Colin Eggleston | Steve Bisley, Sally Conabere, Lorna Lesley, Steven McLean, Leo Wockner | Drama / Thriller TV film | IMDb |
| Lonely Hearts | Paul Cox | Wendy Hughes, Norman Kaye, Julia Blake, Jonathan Hardy | Drama | IMDb |
| Lousy Little Sixpence | Gerald Bostock, Alec Morgan | Geraldine Briggs, Flo Caldwell, Chicka Dixon | Documentary | IMDb |
| The Man from Snowy River | George T. Miller | Tom Burlinson, Terence Donovan, Kirk Douglas, Tommy Dysart, David Bradshaw, Sigrid Thornton, Jack Thompson, Tony Bonner, Chris Haywood, Gus Mercurio, Lorraine Bayly, June Jago | Drama / Adventure / Romance Feature film | IMDb |
| Midnite Spares | Quentin Masters | James Laurie, Gia Carides, Max Cullen, Bruce Spence, David Argue, Graeme Blundell, Tony Barry, Jonathan Coleman, John Godden, John Clayton | Action / Drama Feature film | |
| Monkey Grip | Ken Cameron | Noni Hazlehurst, Colin Friels, Alice Garner, Candy Raymond, Christina Amphlett, Harold Hopkins, Michael Caton, Esben Storm, Lisa Peers, Gary Waddell, Tim Burns, Don Miller-Robinson, Rebecca Rigg | Drama / Musical Feature film | IMDB, Screened at the 1982 Cannes Film Festival |
| A Most Attractive Man | Rivka Hartman | Cathy Downes, Morgan Lew, Julie McGregor, Bradley Miller, Dennis Miller, Carole Skinner, John Stone, Grigor Taylor, Anna Volska, Jane Weir | Comedy / Drama ABC TV film | |
| Moving Out | Michael Pattinson | Vince Colosimo, Kate Jason, Peter Sardi, Sylvie Fonti, Nicole Miranda, Ivar Kants, Sally Cooper, Desiree Smith, Tibor Gyajas, Maurice de Vincentis, Brian James, Sandy Gore | Drama Feature film | |
| The Mystery at Castle House | Peter Maxwell | Simone Buchanan, Jeremy Shadlow, Scott Nicholas, Aileen Britton, Henri Szeps, John Cobley, Ray Meagher, Carole Skinner, Ronald Mee Lee. Robin Bowering, Robert Geammel, Tony Lee | Crime / Family / Mystery Feature film | IMDB aka Mystery At Castle House |
| Next of Kin | Tony Williams | Jacki Kern, John Jarratt, Alex Scott, Gerda Nicolson, Charles McCallum, Bernadette Gibson, Robert Ratti, Tommy Dysart, Debra Lawrance | Horror / Thriller Feature film | IMDb |
| Norman Loves Rose | Henri Safran | Carol Kane, Tony Owen, Warren Mitchell, Myra De Groot, David Downer, Barry Otto, Sandy Gore, Barry Otto, Virginia Hey, Johnny Lockwood, Susan Stenmark | Comedy / Romance Feature film | IMDb |
| Now and Forever | Adrian Carr | Cheryl Ladd, Robert Coleby, Carmen Duncan, Christine Amor, Kris McQuade, Rod Mullinar, Henri Szeps, Alex Scott, Tim Burns, Aileen Britton | Drama / Romance Feature film | |
| On the Run | Mende Brown | Rod Taylor, Paul Winfield, Beau Cox, Shirley Cameron, Ray Meagher, Brian McDermott, Danny Adcock, Barry Lovett, Lola Nixon, Allan Penney, Reg Midway | Drama / Thriller Feature film | |
| Outbreak of Hostilities | David Copping | George Mallaby, Cornelia Frances, Scott Burgess, Colleen Fitzpatrick, Moya O'Sullivan, Judy Nunn, Max Cullen, Earle Cross, Charles Moody | Drama / War TV film | |
| The Pirate Movie | Kevin Annakin | Kristy McNichol, Christopher Atkins, Ted Hamilton, Bill Kerr, Maggie Kirkpatrick, Garry McDonald, Roger Ward, Bill Kerr, Kjell Nilsson, Vernon Wells, Rhonda Burchmore | Adventure / Musical Feature film | IMDb |
| The Plains of Heaven | Ian Pringle | Richard Moir, Reg Evans, Gerard Kennedy, John Flaus, Jenny Cartwright | Drama Feature film | IMDb |
| The Return of Captain Invincible | Philippe Mora | Alan Arkin, Christopher Lee, Kate Fitzpatrick, Michael Pate, Graham Kennedy, Max Phipps, Bill Hunter, Hayes Gordon, John Bluthal, Arthur Dignam, Max Cullen, Noel Ferrier, Bruce Spence, Gus Mercurio, Chris Haywood, Chelsea Brown | Comedy / Fantasy / Musical Feature film | |
| Running on Empty | John Clark | Terry Serio, Deborah Conway, Max Cullen, Vangelis Mourikis, Richard Moir, Chris Haywood, Grahame Bond, Gerry Sont, Penne Hackforth-Jones | Action / Drama Feature film | IMDb aka "Fast Lane Fever" |
| Shadows | Royden Irvine | | Short | IMDb |
| The Sharkcallers of Kontu | Dennis O'Rourke | | Documentary | IMDb |
| A Slice of Life | John Lamond | Robin Nedwell, Juliet Jordan, John Ewart, Jane Clifton, Caz Lederman, Dina Mann, Amanda Muggleton, Julie Nihill, Lulu Pinkus, Gwen Soares, Louise Siversen, Alan Hopgood | Comedy / Romance Feature film | |
| Southern Cross | Peter Maxwell | John Howard, Atsuo Nakamura, George Mallaby, Michael Aitkens, Stuart Wilson, Steve Bisley, Tony Bonner, John Ley, Gary Waddell, Baz Luhrmann, Mark Hembrow, Harold Hopkins | Action / Adventure / War Feature film | aka The Highest Honour |
| Snow: The Movie | Robert Gibson | David Argue, Lance Curtis, Geoff Kelso, Tom Coltraine, Jeanine O'Donnell, Eddie Zandberg, David Argue, Peter Moon, Ian MacFadyen, Peppie Angliss | Comedy Feature film | IMDb |
| Squizzy Taylor | Kevin James Dobson | David Atkins, Jacki Weaver, Alan Cassell, Michael Long, Kim Lewis, Steve Bisley, Fred "Cul" Cullen, Peter Paulson, John Larking, Peter Hosking, Kerry Mack, Robert Hughes | Biography / Drama Feature film | IMDb |
| Starstruck | Gillian Armstrong | Jo Kennedy, Ross O'Donovan, Margo Lee, Ned Lander, Max Cullen, Pat Evison, Dennis Miller, Melissa Jaffer, Norman Erskine, Phil Judd, John O'May, Mark Little, Lucky Grills, Syd Heylen, Carol Burns, Greg Fleet, Geoffrey Rush | Comedy / Drama / Musical Feature film | IMDb |
| Storm Riders | Dick Hoole, David Lourie | | Documentary | IMDb |
| Sweet Dreamers | Tom Cowan | Richard Moir, Sue Smithers, Adam Bowen, Frankie Raymond | Drama / Romance Feature film | IMDb |
| Taurus Rising | Pino Amenta | Annette Andre, Diane Craig, Alan Cassell, Maurie Fields, Linda Newton, Damon Herriman, Gordon Glenwright, Georgie Sterling, Marina Finlay, Jessica Noad, Andrew Clarke | Drama TV film / TV Pilot to series (1982) | |
| Tennis Elbow | John Thomson | David Swann, Mark Neal, Lance Curtis | Short | IMDb |
| Turkey Shoot | Brian Trenchard-Smith | Steve Railsback, Olivia Hussey, Michael Craig, Carmen Duncan, Noel Ferrier, Lynda Stoner, Roger Ward, Gus Mercurio, John Ley, Steve Rackman, Oriana Panozzo, John Godden | Action / Drama / Thriller / Horror Feature film | IMDb |
| Warriors of the Deep | Tony Wheeler | | Documentary drama | IMDb |
| We of the Never Never | Igor Auzins | Angela Punch McGregor, Arthur Dignam, Lewis Fitz-Gerald, John Jarratt, Tommy Lewis, Tony Barry, Tex Morton, Mawuyul Yanthalawuy, Martin Vaughan | Historical / Drama Feature film | IMDb, Based on popular Australian autobiographical novel by Jeannie Gunn, first published in 1908 |
| Wilde's Domain | Charles Tingwell | Kit Taylor, June Salter, Lenore Smith, Steven Grives, Jeanie Drynan, Ivar Kants, Henri Szeps, Alan Lee, Tim Elliot, Martin Vaughan | Drama ABC TV film | |
| With Prejudice | Esben Storm | Max Cullen, David Slingsby, Scott Burgess, John Ley, Richard Moir, Chris Haywood, Terry Serio, Paul Sonkkila, Peter Whitford, Tony Barry, John Clayton, Tim McKenzie, John Clayton | Drama Feature film | IMDb |
| The Year of Living Dangerously | Peter Weir | Mel Gibson, Sigourney Weaver, Linda Hunt, Michael Murphy, Bill Kerr, Noel Ferrier, Bembol Roco, Paul Sonkkila, Ali Nur, Dominador Robridillo, Joel Agona, Mike Emperio, Kuh Ledesma, Cecily Polson | Drama / Romance / Thriller / War Feature film | IMDb, Entered into the 1983 Cannes Film Festival, Won the Academy Award for Best Supporting Actress |

== See also ==
- 1982 in Australia
- 1982 in Australian television
