= In Search of Anna =

- Theatrical film poster
- Directed by: Esben Storm
- Written by: Esben Storm
- Produced by: Esben Storm
- Starring: Richard Moir; Judy Morris; Chris Haywood
- Cinematography: Michael Edols
- Edited by: Dusan Werner
- Music by: John Martyn; Alan Stivell
- Release dates: 20 May 1978 (Cannes); 28 June 1979
- Country: Australia
- Language: English
- Budget: A$327,665

In Search of Anna is a 1978 film directed by Esben Storm.

It was originally envisioned as a TV series but then became a feature film.

== Plot synopsis ==
Richard Moir plays Tony, who has just been released from jail. His former inmates want him to participate in a robbery, but Tony just wants to find Anna and ends up dealing with one problem at a time.

== Cast ==
- Richard Moir as Tony
- Judy Morris as Sam
- Chris Haywood as Jerry
- Bill Hunter as Peter
- Alex Taifer as Tony's father
- Ian Nimmo as Buzz
- Gary Waddell as Maxie
- Richard Murphett as Undertaker
- Maurie Fields as Bert

== Production ==
It was Storm's second feature, following his debut with 27A and after an unsuccessful attempt to make another movie called Angel Gear.

I became aware that all the films being made in Australia were period films, Picnic at Hanging Rock, The Getting of Wisdom, Between Wars. I felt this reflected a society that was unable to come to terms with where it was at. I know you have to look into the past and find your heroes but it seemed to me that it was reflective of a desire not to face up to where we were at. That also coincided with where I was at personally in my relationship to women and to Haydn [former collaborator Haydn Keenan], so I thought I should make a film about leaving the past behind and coming to terms with the present, moving into the future with a positive attitude. That's what I thought I should do personally and that's what I felt Australia should do. It led to In Search of Anna.

The budget was meant to be $231,000 but went more than $100,000 over. $50,000 was provided by the Victorian Film Corporation. Shooting began on 28 February 1977.

== Reception ==
According to Storm the film performed "really well, relatively" at the Australian box office, running for six weeks. It was also nominated for six AFI Awards.

=== Accolades ===
Award	Category	Subject	Result
AACTA Awards (1978 AFI Awards)	Best Film	Esben Storm	Nominated
AACTA Awards (1978 AFI Awards)	Best Direction	Esben Storm	Nominated
AACTA Awards (1978 AFI Awards)	Best Original Screenplay	Esben Storm	Won
AACTA Awards (1978 AFI Awards)	Best Actor	Richard Moir	Nominated
