= Picnic =

Excursion at which a meal is eaten outdoors

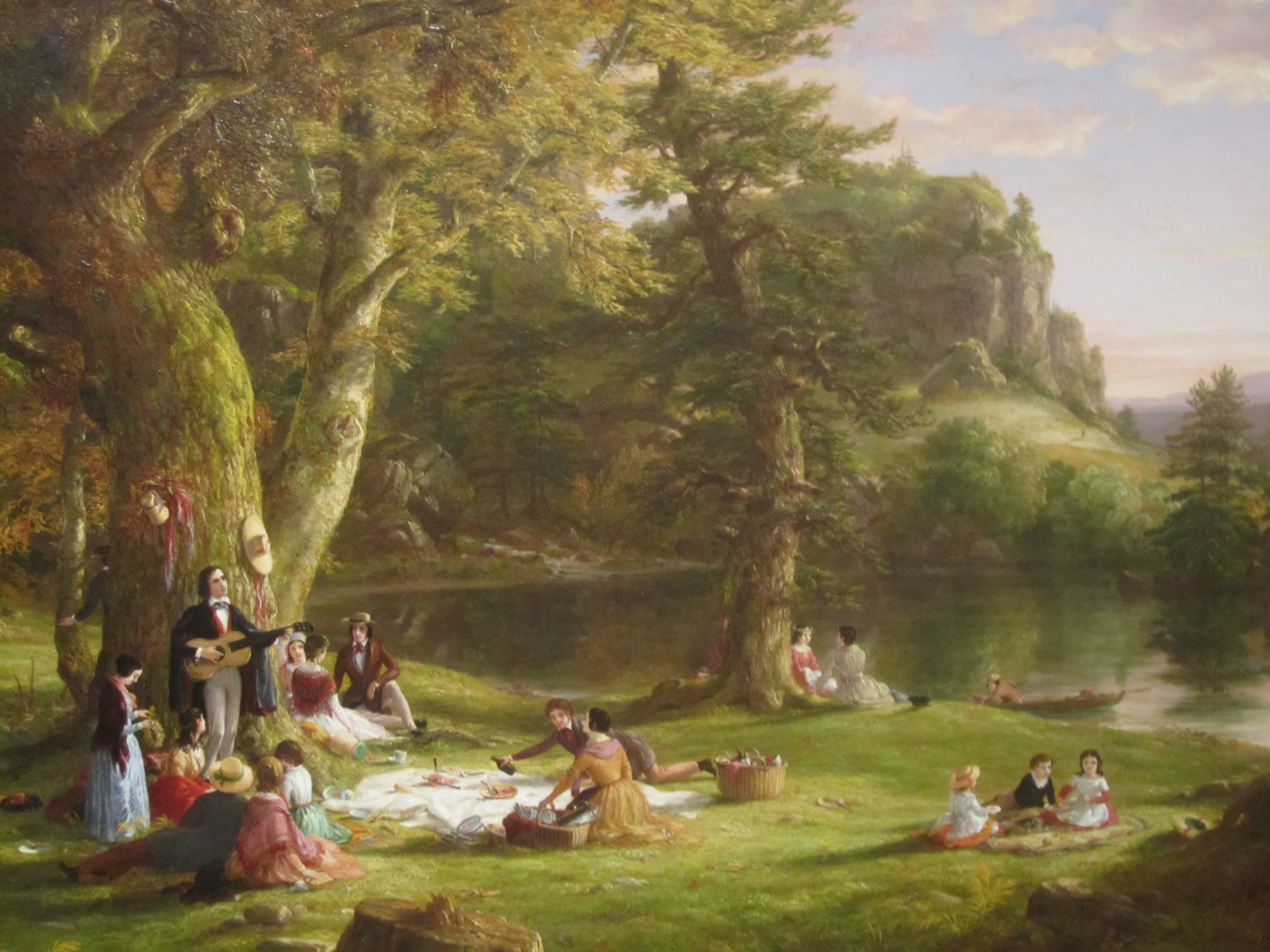
A Picnic Party by Thomas Cole, 1846

A picnic is a meal taken outdoors as part of an excursion, especially in scenic surroundings, such as a park, lakeside, or other place affording an interesting view, or else in conjunction with a public event such as preceding an open-air theater performance, and usually in summer or spring. It is different from other meals because it requires free time to leave home.

Historically, in Europe, the idea of a meal that was jointly contributed to and enjoyed out-of-doors was essential to picnic from the early 19th century.

Picnickers like to sit on the ground on a rug or blanket. Picnics can be informal with throwaway plates or formal with silver cutlery and crystal wine glasses. Tables and chairs may be used, but this is less common.

Outdoor games or other forms of entertainment are common at large picnics. In public parks, a picnic area generally includes picnic tables and possibly built-in barbecue grills, water faucets (taps), garbage (rubbish) containers, restrooms (toilets) and gazebos (shelters).

Some picnics are a potluck, where each person contributes a dish for all to share. The food eaten is rarely hot, instead taking the form of sandwiches, finger food, fresh fruit, salad and cold meats. It can be accompanied by chilled wine, champagne or soft drinks.

== Etymology ==
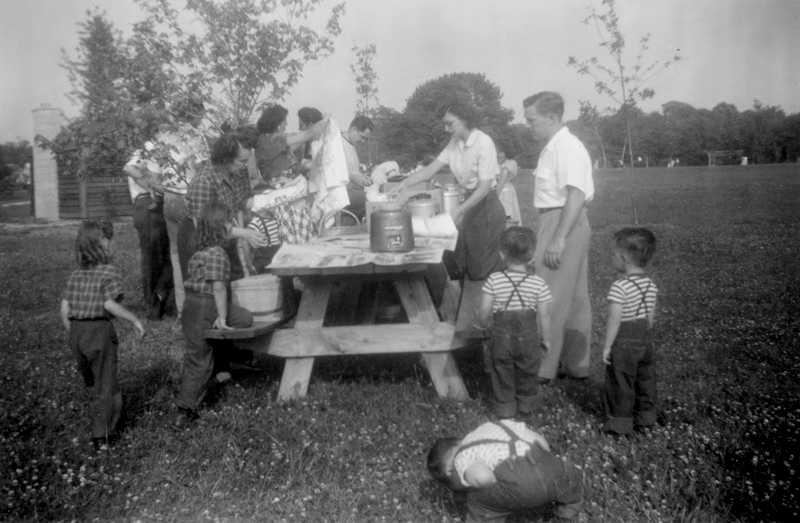
A picnic party assembling in Columbus, Ohio, c. 1950

The word comes from the French pique-nique. However, it may also have been borrowed from the German word Picknick, which was itself borrowed from French.

The earliest English citation is in 1748, from Lord Chesterfield (Philip Stanhope, 4th Earl of Chesterfield) who associates a "pic-nic" with card-playing, drinking, and conversation; around 1800, Cornelia Knight spelled the word as "pique-nique" in describing her travels in France.

According to some dictionaries, the French word pique-nique is based on the verb piquer, which means 'pick', 'peck', or 'nab', and the rhyming addition nique, which means 'thing of little importance', 'bagatelle', 'trifle'. It first appears in 1649 in an anonymous broadside of burlesque verse called Les Charmans effects des barricades: ou l'Amitié durable de la compagnie des Frères bachiques de pique-nique : en vers burlesque (The Lasting Friendship of the Band of Brothers of the Bacchic Picnic). The satire describes Brother Pique-Nique who, during the civil war known as the Fronde, attacks his food with gusto instead of his enemies; Bacchus was the Roman god of wine, a reference to the drunken antics of the gourmand musketeers. By 1694 the word was listed in Gilles Ménage's Dictionnaire étymologique, ou Origines de la langue françoise with the meaning of a shared meal, with each guest paying for himself, but with no reference to eating outdoors. It reached the Dictionnaire de l'Académie française in 1840 with the same meaning. In English "picnic" began to refer to an outdoor meal only at the beginning of the 19th century.

== History ==
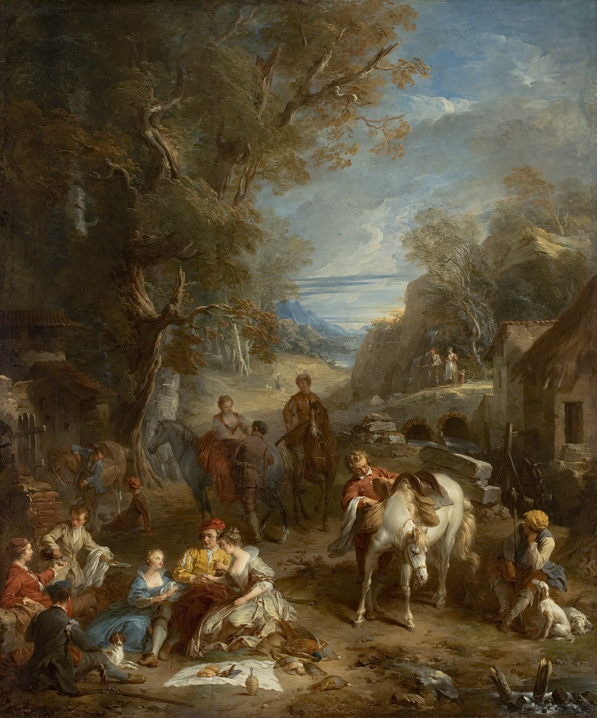
Hunt Picnic by François Lemoyne, 1723

The practice of an elegant meal eaten out-of-doors, rather than an agricultural worker's mid-day meal in a field, was connected with respite from hunting from the Middle Ages; the excuse for the pleasurable outing of 1723 in François Lemoyne's painting (illustration) is still offered in the context of a hunt. In it, a white cloth can be seen, and, on it, wine, bread, and roast chicken.

While these outdoors meals could be called picnics, there are, according to Levy, reasons not to do so. 'The English', he claims, 'left the hunter's meal unnamed until after 1806, when they began calling almost any alfresco meal a picnic'. The French, Levy goes on to say, 'refrained from calling anything outdoors a pique-nique until the English virtually made the word their own, and only afterwards did they acknowledge that a picnic might be enjoyed outdoors instead of indoors'.

=== Pic Nic Society ===
The French Revolution popularized the picnic across the world. French aristocrats fled to other Western countries, bringing their picnicking traditions with them.

In 1802, a fashionable group of over 200 aristocratic Londoners formed the Pic Nic Society. The members were Francophiles, or may have been French, who flaunted their love for all things French when the wars with France lulled between 1801 and 1830. Food historian Polly Russell however suggests that the Pic Nic Society lasted until 1850. The group's intent was to offer theatrical entertainments and lavish meals followed by gambling. Members met in hired rooms in Tottenham Street. There was no kitchen so all food had to be made elsewhere. Each member was expected to provide a share of the entertainment and of the refreshments, with no one particular host.

=== Victorian feasts ===
Mrs Beeton's picnic menus (in her Book of Household Management of 1861) are 'lavish and extravagant', according to Claudia Roden. She lists Beeton's bill of fare for forty persons in her own book Picnics and Other Outdoor Feasts:

A joint of cold roast beef, a joint of cold boiled beef, 2 ribs of lamb, 2 shoulders of lamb, 4 roast fowls, 2 roast ducks, 1 ham, 1 tongue, 2 veal and ham pies, 2 pigeon pies, 6 medium sized lobsters, 1 piece of collared calveshead, 18 lettuces, 6 baskets of salad, 6 cucumbers. Stewed fruit well sweetened and put into glass bottles well corked, 3 or 4 dozen plain pastry biscuits to eat with the stewed fruit, 2 dozen fruit turnovers, 4 dozen cheese cakes, 2 cold cabinet puddings in moulds, a few jam puffs, 1 large cold Christmas pudding (this must be good), a few baskets of fresh fruit, 3 dozen plain biscuits, a piece of cheese, 6 lbs of butter (this of course includes the butter for tea), 4 quatern loaves of household bread, 3 dozen rolls, 6 loaves of tin bread (for tea), 2 plain plum cakes, 2 pound cakes, 2 sponge cakes, a tin of mixed biscuits, ½ lb of tea. Coffee is not suitable for a picnic being difficult to make.

=== Political picnics ===
The image of picnics as a peaceful social activity can be used for political protest. In this context, a picnic functions as a temporary occupation of significant public territory. A famous example is the Pan-European Picnic held on both sides of the Hungarian/Austrian border on 19 August 1989 as part of the struggle towards German reunification; this mass meal led indirectly to the collapse of the Soviet Union.

On Bastille Day 2000, as a Millennium celebration, France created "l'incroyable pique-nique" (the incredible picnic), which stretched 1000 km from the English Channel to the Mediterranean, along the Méridienne verte.

=== Church picnics ===
Various religious denominations host annual church picnics for their congregation and local community. These picnics traditionally take place from August to mid-October when church members and the community socialize over food, conversation and games. In 1937, the Congregational Church of New York hosted 2,000 for its 41st annual event. American psychologist and newspaper columnist Dr George W. Crane once wrote that Christ held the first church picnic when he asked his disciples to feed the 5,000 who gathered to hear him speak.

== Types of contemporary picnic food ==
Contemporary picnics for many people involve simple food. In The Oxford Companion to Food, Alan Davidson offers hard-boiled eggs, sandwiches and pieces of cold chicken as good examples. In America, food writer Walter Levy suggests that 'a picnic menu might include cold fried chicken, devilled eggs, sandwiches, cakes and sweets, cold sodas, and hot coffee'.

Picnics are traditionally eaten at Glyndebourne Opera during the interval and Roden proposes a Champagne Menu, as made by the Argentinian pianist Alberto Portugheis: Mousse de Caviare, Chaudfroid de Canard, Tomatoes Farcies and Pêches aux fraises (caviare mousse, cold duck, stuffed tomatoes and peaches and strawberries).

== Activities ==
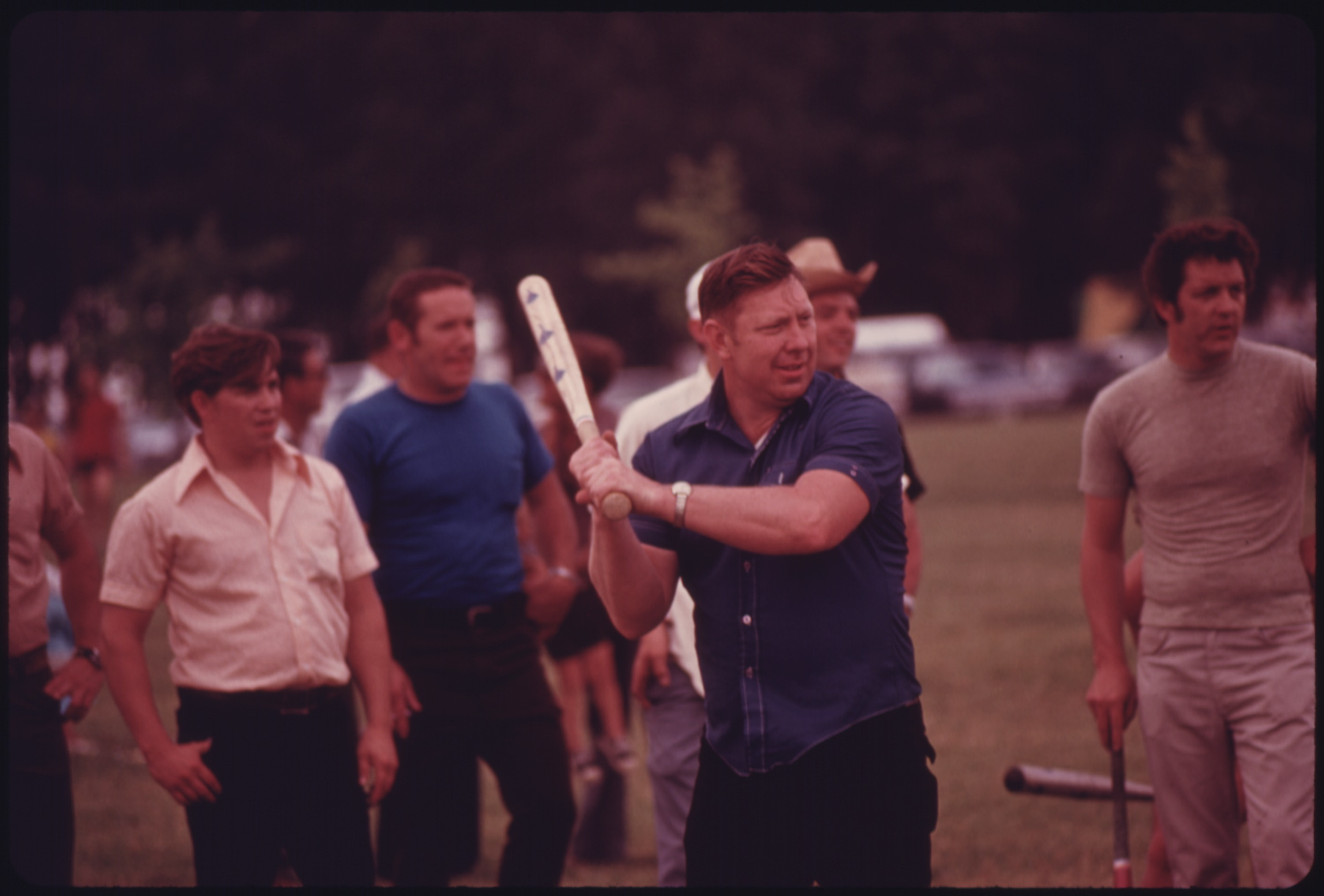
A game of softball at a company picnic in the United States, 1974

In the mid 19th century, picnic games were organised by charities in the US to raise funds. In the 1880s, companies started to sponsor such picnic events for publicity and to gain the favour of their employees. The black community was segregated at this time but to gain respectability, games such as baseball were organised by black politicians at picnics in municipal parks and fairgrounds.

Games played at a picnic may use the food which has been brought. Heavy food such as a watermelon may be used in a relay race which also serves the purpose of transporting the food to the eating area. After it is consumed, the seed or stones of fruit like cherries may be used for a spitting contest game or marbles.

If a large crowd is expected for a picnic, some organisation will be required. A schedule of events may be drawn up and events organised for different levels of ability and types of participant: men, women, adults and children. Handbills, notices and tickets may be used to publicise and administer the events.

== Cultural representations ==
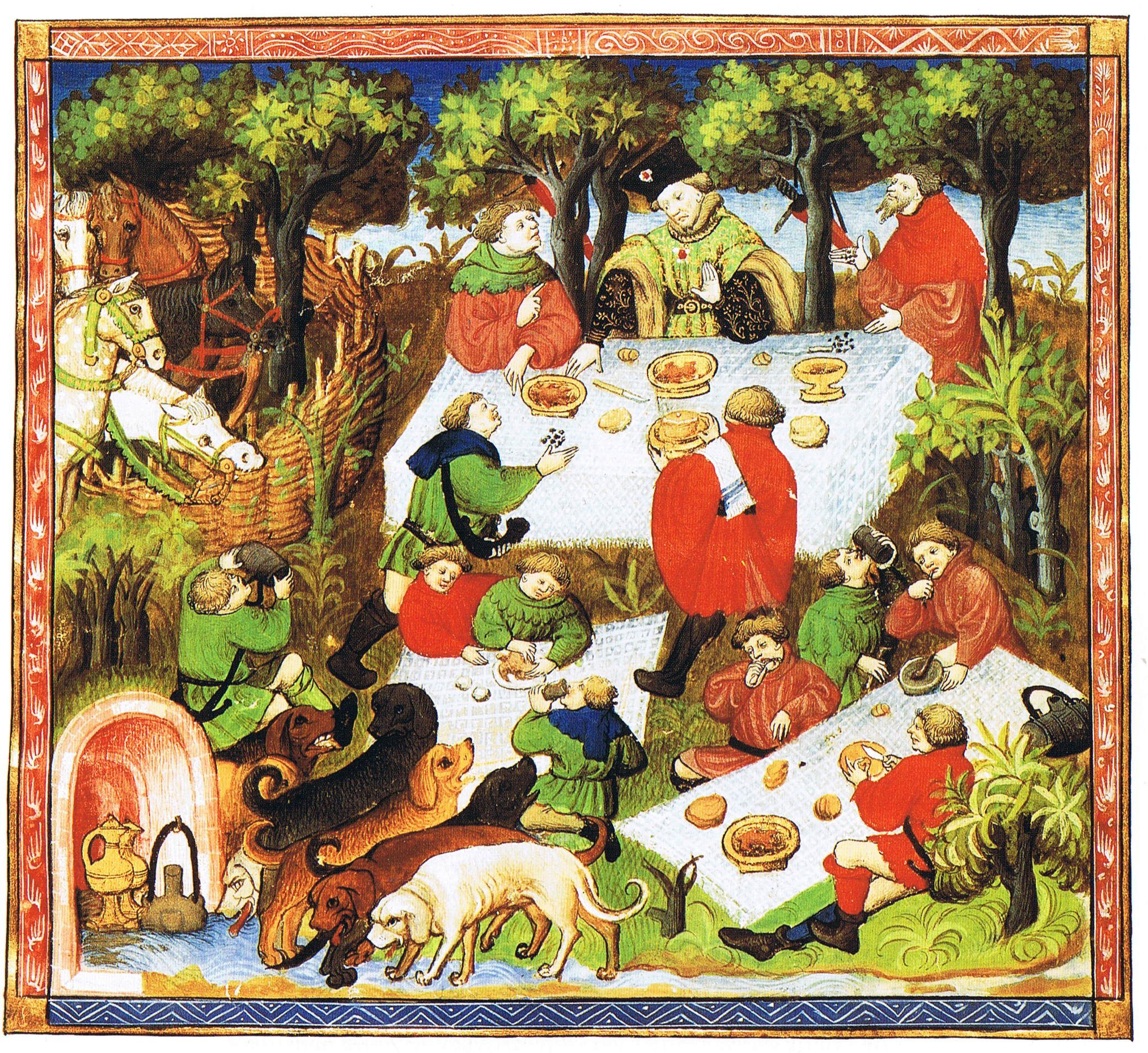
A nobleman with his entourage enjoying a picnic. Illustration from a French edition of The Hunting Book of Gaston Phoebus, 15th century

=== Film ===
- The 1955 film Picnic, based on the Pulitzer Prize-winning play of the same title by William Inge, was a multiple Oscar winner. A picnic is expected in the film but the writer does not include it: 'There is no picnic in Picnic'. The potato salad, bread and butter sandwiches and devilled eggs are left in the car as the characters Madge and Hal cannot resist each other's charms and Hal says 'We're not goin' on no goddamn picnic'. The film has been remade twice for television, in 1986 and 2000.
- The Office Picnic (1972) is a dark comedy set in an Australian Public Service office. It was written and produced by filmmaker Tom Cowan, who became famous for his work on the series Survivor.
- In Peter Weir's mystery film Picnic at Hanging Rock (1975), three girls and one of their teachers on a school outing mysteriously disappear. The only one who is later found remembers almost nothing. It is based on a 1967 drama and mystery novel of the same title by Australian author Joan Lindsay. In 2018 it was remade for television.
- In Bhaji on the Beach (1993, titled Picknick on the Beach in the German version), nine Indian women of various ages flee from their everyday lives by taking a joint excursion to the British resort town of Blackpool. They eat, according to journalist Simran Hans 'a flask of chai, a metal tiffin of poppadoms and sweaty samosas in plastic Tupperware'.

=== Paintings ===
From the 1830s, Romantic American landscape paintings of spectacular scenery often included a group of picnickers in the foreground. An early American illustration of the picnic is Thomas Cole's The Pic-Nic of 1846 (Brooklyn Museum of Art). In it a guitarist serenades the genteel social group in the Hudson River Valley with the Catskills visible in the distance. Cole's well-dressed young picnickers having finished their repast, served from splint baskets on blue-and-white china, stroll about in the woodland and boat on the lake.

- Le déjeuner sur l'herbe (Luncheon on the Grass) by Édouard Manet depicts a picnic. The 1862 painting juxtaposes a female nude and a scantily dressed female bather on a picnic with two fully dressed men in a rural setting.
- A more modern portrayal is Past Times by Kerry James Marshall, from 1997, which depicts a black family picnicking in front of a lake. Two radios laid on their gingham patterned picnic blanket emit the lyrics of The Temptations and Snoop Dogg, while figures in the background engage in other activities synonymous with affluent white-American suburban culture.

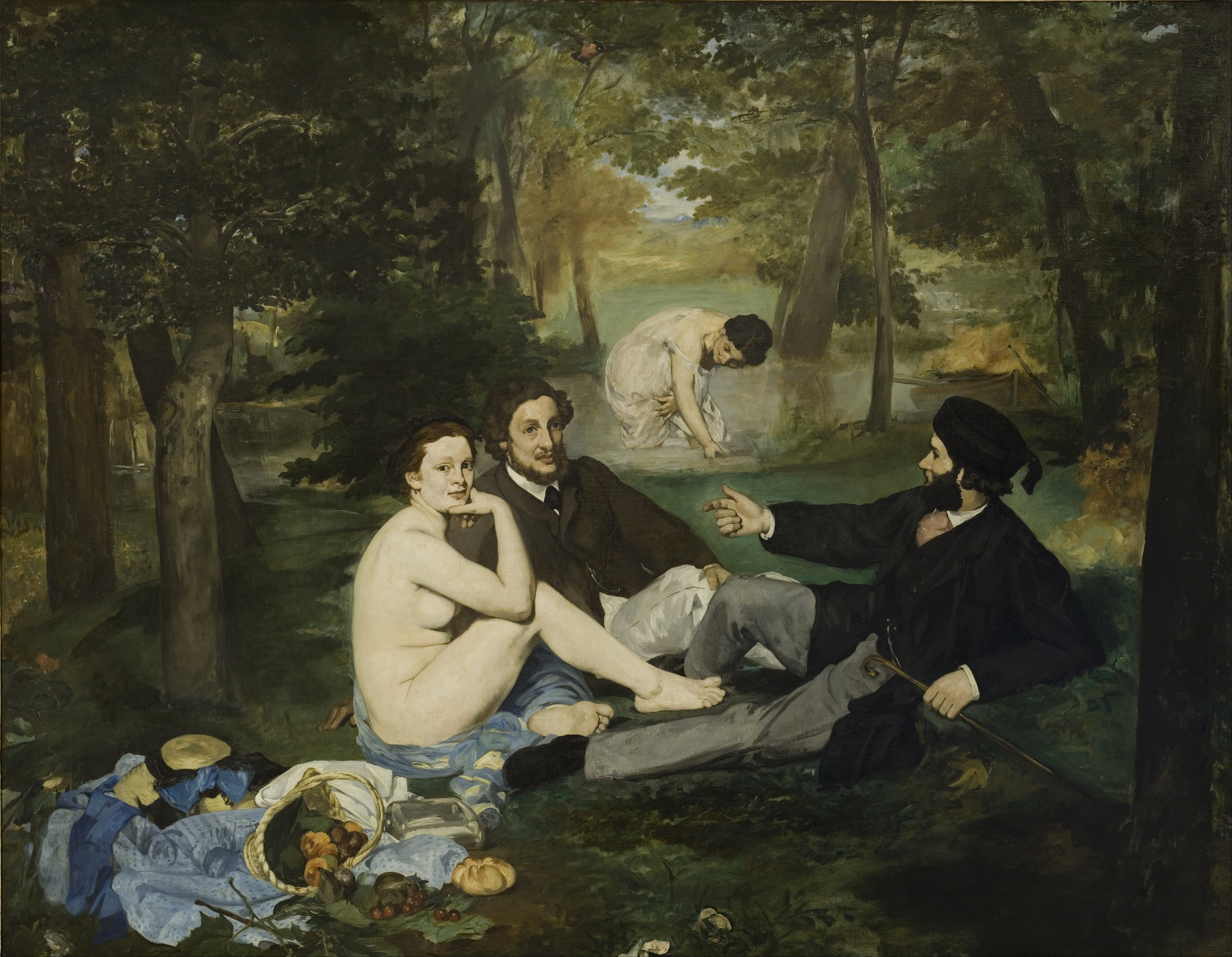
The Luncheon on the Grass by Édouard Manet, 1862

=== Literature ===
A book of verse beneath the bough,
A loaf of bread, a jug of wine, and thou
Beside me singing in the Wilderness –
Ah, wilderness were paradise enow!

— Omar Khayyam, in his 12th century Rubaiyat

- Jane Austen is one of the first English novelists to name picnics. She has two outdoor picnics in the novel Emma (1816). One is in the strawberry garden at Donwell Abbey. Parties where guests would pick their own strawberries were popular in the early nineteenth century and Mrs Elton, wearing a large bonnet and carrying a basket, spoke at length about them. The second is at Box Hill in Surrey. This picnic turns out to be a sore disappointment: Frank Churchill said to Emma: 'Our companions are excessively stupid. What shall we do to rouse them? Any nonsense will serve...' The food is described in vague terms as a 'cold collation'. While Jane Austen talked excessively about food in her private letters, she was less obliging in her novels. On both of these occasions, in Emma, when food is eaten outside it ends in 'ruffled tempers and hurt feelings' according to food historian Maggie Lane.
- In Alfred Tennyson's poem Audley Court (1838) the picnickers eat dark bread and cold game pie in aspic and drink cider while they sing and chat about their old love affairs.
  There, on a slope of orchard, Francis laid A damask napkin wrought with horse and hound, Brought out a dusky loaf that smelt of home, And, half-cut-down, a pasty costly-made, Where quail and pigeon, lark and leveret lay, Like fossils of the rock, with golden yolks Imbedded and injellied; last, with these, A flask of cider from his father's vats, Prime, which I knew; and so we sat and ate And talked old matters over; who was dead, Who married, who was like to be, and how.
- In Charles Dickens' The Mystery of Edwin Drood (1870) a 'potluck' meal is described "For dinner we'll have a tureen of the hottest and strongest soup available, and we'll have the best made-dish that can be recommended, and we'll have a joint (such as a haunch of mutton), and we'll have a goose, or a turkey, or any little stuffed thing of that sort that may happen to be in the bill of fare - in short we'll have whatever there is on hand.' But Dickens, Levy argues, 'differentiates potluck and picnic' when he adds that 'Miss Twinkleton (in her amateur state of existence) has contributed herself and a veal pie to a picnic'.
- The Wind in the Willows (1908), the classic children's novel by Kenneth Grahame, begins with a much-quoted impromptu excursion; both the idyllic riverbank setting and the lavish provisions are Platonic ideals of the English country picnic. Rat is a well-organised host; a brief visit to his home is all he needs before he reappears "staggering under a fat, wicker luncheon-basket" which his friend Mole serves onto a tablecloth.
- In Fernando Arrabal's one-act drama Picnic on the Battlefield (1959) the young and inexperienced soldier private Zepo is visited unexpectedly by his devoted parents. They arrive with a picnic basket, which they unpack 'spreading sausage, hard-boiled eggs, ham, sandwiches, salad, cakes, and red wine on a cloth'. Zapo reminds them that 'discipline and hand-grenades are what's wanted in war, not visits' but they ignore him and invite an enemy soldier to join in their picnic. After wine and lacklustre conversation they start enthusiastically dancing to the pasodoble to the music of the phonograph they've brought with them. They are all killed by machine-gun fire. Levy recounts 'The shocked audience sits watching stretcher-bearers remove the bodies, listening to a stuck phonograph needle repeat the pasodoble tune'.
- No Picnic on Mount Kenya: The Story of Three P.O.W.s' Escape to Adventure (1946), by Felice Benuzzi, is the true story of three Italian prisoners of war who, faced with years of tedium in a detention camp, decide to break out in order to climb Africa's second-highest mountain. "No expedition on the mountain was ever a picnic" Vivienne de Watteville had written in her book Speak to the Earth (1935) about her 1929 visit to Mount Kenya. Benuzzi's English title, perhaps suggested by this line of de Watteville's, refers to the expression 'It was no picnic', meaning 'It was hard going', but with an ironic allusion to the climbers' meagre P.O.W. rations.
- The novel Roadside Picnic (1972) by Boris and Arkady Strugatsky, was the source for the film Stalker (1979) by Andrei Tarkovsky. The novel is about a mysterious 'zone' filled with strange and often deadly extraterrestrial artefacts, which are theorized by some scientists to be the refuse from an alien "picnic" on Earth.

=== Music ===
- In 1906, the American composer John Walter Bratton wrote a musical piece originally titled "The Teddy Bear Two Step". It became popular in a 1908 instrumental version renamed 'Teddy Bears' Picnic', performed by the Arthur Pryor Band. The song regained prominence in 1932 when the Irish lyricist Jimmy Kennedy added words and it was recorded by the then popular Henry Hall (and his BBC Dance Orchestra) featuring Val Rosing (Gilbert Russell) as lead vocalist, and went on to sell a million copies. 'The Teddy Bears' Picnic' resurfaced again in the late 1940s and early 1950s when it was used as the theme song for the Big Jon and Sparkie children's radio show. This perennial favorite has appeared on many children's recordings ever since, and is the theme song for the AHL's Hershey Bears hockey club. lyrics and audio from the BBC
- 'Stoned Soul Picnic', by Laura Nyro (released in 1968), was also a major hit for the group The 5th Dimension.
- Roxette's 1996 song 'June Afternoon' depicts images of people having fun and eating in a park during a warm sunny June day.
