= Richard Moir =

Australian actor

- Born: 1950 (age 75–76); Queensland, Australia
- Occupations: Actor, editor
- Years active: 1974–1999, 2022-
- Known for: Prisoner as Eddie Cook; Round the Twist as Tony Twist; Law of the Land as Sergeant Clive
- Spouse: Julie Nihill
- Children: 2

Richard Moir (born 1950) is an Australian former actor and editor.

== Career ==
Moir initially began his career as a film editor for low-budget 1970s Australian films and TV series, many of which were the work of director Esben Storm. He struck up a friendship with Storm that was instrumental in kick-starting his acting career. Moir was also a film assistant for Four Corners and later worked as a reporter for A Current Affair before he transitioned to acting.

Moir first became known for his role in the TV soap opera Prisoner (also known as Prisoner: Cell Block H) as the original character of electrician Eddie Cook.

Moir is also well known for playing 'Dad' Tony Twist in the first two seasons of children's comedy Round the Twist for 26 episodes, from 1989 to 1992, before Andrew Gilbert took over the role for the final two seasons. From 1993 to 1999, he played the regular role of Sergeant Clive O'Connor in crime drama series Law of the Land.

Moir appeared in several miniseries, including Players in the Gallery (1980) and 1915 (1982). The latter was a big budget Logie Award-winning production, based on the novel by Roger McDonald, in which he was part of the ensemble cast which included Sigrid Thornton. He also had roles in The Last Bastion (1984), Land of Hope (1985) and The Challenge (1986–1987), the latter, a retelling of Australia's win in the 1983 America’s Cup sailing race, in which Moir appeared alongside Nicholas Hammond and Lorraine Bayly. Further miniseries included The Fremantle Conspiracy (1988), Bodysurfer (1989) and Ring of Scorpio (1991).

Moir also had television guest roles in Kirby's Company (1977), Chopper Squad (1978), Cop Shop (1978–1980), The Sullivans (1980), Bellamy (1981), Carson's Law (1984), Special Squad (1984), A Country Practice (1984–1992), Winners (1985; 1990), Dolphin Cove (1989), Rafferty's Rules (1989), G.P. (1989) and Phoenix (1993).

Moir's film credits are also numerous, beginning in 1974 with 27A. In 1978, he starred as Tony, opposite Judy Morris, Bill Hunter and Chris Haywood in In Search of Anna. He went on to appear in The Odd Angry Shot (1979), The Chain Reaction (1980), Heatwave, Running on Empty, Going Down (all in 1982), With Prejudice (1983), and An Indecent Obsession (1985). In 1987, he had a starring role as Al the chef in Jilted, opposite Tina Bursill. He further appeared in Minnamurra (1989), Isabelle Eberhardt (1991), Welcome to Woop Woop and Joey (both 1997). He also appeared in made-for-television films.

In 2022, Moir made a return to acting when he appeared in the short film Not Dark Yet, playing a man deteriorating from Parkinson's Disease, made by his daughter, Bonnie.

== Personal life ==
Moir was married to actress Julie Nihill, with whom he shares two daughters, actress Lucy Moir and director Bonnie Moir.

In 1990, Moir was diagnosed with Parkinson's disease. At first, he successfully hid his diagnosis, but when his speech started to become affected, the degenerative effects of the disease gradually brought his acting career to a premature end.

Moir later underwent deep brain stimulation therapy, a process covered by Esben Storm’s 2006 documentary The Bridge at Midnight Trembles. The short film Not Dark Yet, made by his filmmaker daughter Bonnie, also mirrors Moir's life. His portrayal of a role of a man deteriorating from Parkinson's disease was much praised.

== Filmography ==
=== Film ===
Year	Title	Role	Notes	Ref.
1974	27A	Richard		
1978	In Search of Anna	Tony		
1978	Hanging About		Short film	
1979	The Odd Angry Shot	Medic		
1980	The Chain Reaction	Jr. Const. Pigott		
1982	Heatwave	Stephen West		
1982	Sweet Dreamers	Will Daniels		
1982	Running On Empty (aka Fast Lane Fever)	Fox		
1982	Going Down	Hotel night manager		
1982	The Plains of Heaven (aka Panic Station)	Barker		
1983	With Prejudice	Middleton		
1985	Wrong World	David Trueman		
1985	An Indecent Obsession	Luce Daggett		
1987	Jilted	Al		
1988	Point of Departure	Party Leader		
1989	Minnamurra (aka Outback or Wrangler)	Bill Thompson		
1991	Isabelle Eberhardt	Lt. Comte		
1991	Deadly	Willie the Pathologist		
1997	Welcome to Woop Woop	Reggie		
1997	Joey	School Teacher		
2002	Not Dark Yet	Russell	Short film	
2006	The Bridge at Midnight Trembles	Self	Documentary film	

=== Television ===
Year	Title	Role	Notes	Ref.
1977	Kirby's Company		Episode 13: "I owe you 13 cents"	
1978	Chopper Squad	Curley	Season 2, episode 8: "The Other Man's Grass"	
1978–1980	Cop Shop	Ken Spencer / Mark Doyle / Chris Porter / Jock Gould	7 episodes	
1979	Prisoner	Eddie Cook	16 episodes	
1980	Players in the Gallery	David	TV movie	
1980	The Department	Peter	TV movie	
1980	The Sullivans	Mr Harris	2 episodes	
1981	Bellamy	Carter	Episode 5: "Swan Song"	
1981	Sporting Chance	Andy Tate	Episode 1: "You Can't Eat Medals"	
1982	1915	Reverend Fox	Miniseries, 6 episodes	
1984	Singles	Stefan	Miniseries, 1 episode	
1984	The Last Bastion	Major Carlyon	Miniseries, 3 episodes	
1984	Carson's Law	Henry Collins	Episode 128: "A Fond Concept"	
1984	Special Squad	Errol	Episode 43: "Gone for the Doctor"	
1984–1992	A Country Practice	Doug Simmonds / Geoff Gibson	Seasons 4 & 12, 4 episodes	
1985	Remember Me	Howard	TV movie	
1985	The Long Way Home	Bob	TV movie	
1985	Land of Hope	Dominic Quinn	Miniseries	
1985; 1990	Winners	The King / Minister	Seasons 1–2, 2 episodes	
1986–1987	The Challenge	Warren Jones	Miniseries, 6 episodes	
1988	Alterations	Richard	TV movie	
1988	The Fremantle Conspiracy	Hogan	Miniseries	
1988	Hard Knuckle	Alister	TV movie	
1989	Dolphin Cove		Episode 3: "Reading, Writing, and Telepathy"	
1989	Rafferty's Rules	Geoffrey Sole	Season 5, episode 13: "Whatever Gets You Through the Night"	
1989	Bodysurfer	Brian	Miniseries, 2 episodes	
1989	G.P.	Paul Donaldson	Season 3, episode 7: "Testament/Say a Little Prayer"	
1989–1992	Round the Twist	Tony Twist	Seasons 1–2, 26 episodes	
1991	Ring of Scorpio	Sergeant Hayes	Miniseries, 4 episodes	
1993	Phoenix	Tony Hansen	Season 2, episode 4: "The Return"	
1993–1999	Law of the Land	Sergeant Clive O'Connor	Seasons 1–4, 38 episodes	
1997	One Way Ticket	Governor	TV movie	

== Theatre ==
Year	Title	Role	Notes	Ref.
1976	The Speakers	Cafferty	Nimrod Theatre Company, Sydney	
1982	Godsend	Reverend Hugh Stacey	Melbourne Athenaeum with MTC	
1983	Vocations	Godrey Hannam	La Boite Theatre, Brisbane	
1983	Betrayal	Robert	Edward St Theatre, Brisbane with QTC	
