= The Last Bastion =

1984 film

- Genre: War
- Written by: Denis Whitburn; David Williamson
- Directed by: Chris Thomson; George Miller
- Starring: Michael Blakemore; John Wood; Timothy West
- Theme music composer: Colin Stead
- Country of origin: Australia
- Original language: English
- No. of episodes: 3 × 2 hours

Production
- Producers: Brian Rosen; Denis Whitburn; David Williamson
- Cinematography: Louis Irving
- Editor: Sara Bennett
- Running time: 360 min.
- Budget: $3.6 million

Original release
- Network: Network Ten
- Release: 5 November – 7 November 1984

The Last Bastion is a television mini-series which aired in Australia in November 1984. It is a docudrama telling the story of Australia's involvement in World War II, and its often strained relations with its two main allies, Great Britain and the United States.

The running time of the series is reported as 360 minutes (6 hours) on the IMDb page, that is the screening time with ads. Each part runs for approx 90 minutes, both on VHS tape and DVD, is approximately 160 minutes implying they are heavily edited versions, as they've compressed 3 episodes into one 2 hour 40 minute film.

The 3 episodes still remain in the Screensound Archive.

== Cast ==
- Michael Blakemore as John Curtin
- John Wood as Robert Menzies
- Timothy West as Winston Churchill
- Robert Vaughn as General Douglas MacArthur
- Warren Mitchell as Franklin D. Roosevelt
- Ray Barrett as General Thomas Blamey
- Peter Whitford as H. V. "Bert" Evatt
- Max Cullen as Eddie Ward
- Jon Ewing as Billy Hughes
- Nancye Hayes as Elsie Curtin
- Neil Fitzpatrick as Frederick Shedden
- Bill Hunter as Ben Chifley
- Reg Gillam as General George C. Marshall
- Tim Robertson as Admiral Ernest King
- Colin McEwan as Frank Forde
- John Clayton as Arthur Fadden
- Vincent Ball as General Sturdee
- John McTernan as Colonel Willoughby
- Richard Moir as Major Carlyon
- Don Crosby as Arthur Coles
- Richard Meikle as General
- Harold Hopkins as Harold Holt

== Production ==
The series was the result of two years work for Williamson. It was his first work for television and his first effort as producer. Some of this experience may have informed Williamson's play and film Emerald City although Williamson has always denied the character of Mike McCord was based on Denis Whitburn.

Kristian Williamson helped with the research and wrote a book with the same title.
