= Hilary Linstead =

British-Australian casting director and producer

- Born: 18 October 1938; London, England, United Kingdom
- Died: 5 August 2022 (aged 83); Australia
- Occupations: Actress; producer; talent agent; casting director
- Parent: Patrick Linstead (father)

Hilary Linstead (18 October 1938 – 5 August 2022) was a British and Australian actor and producer. She was also a talent agent and casting director. She nurtured and promoted many of Australia's leading directors John Bell, Jim Sharman, Gillian Armstrong, Jane Campion, Neil Armfield, and Baz Luhrmann. Over the course of her career, Linstead represented performers and comedians. Other talent she represented included writers, designers, composers, choreographers, and cinematographers.

== Early life and education ==
Linstead, the only daughter of Aileen Edith Ellis Rowland Abbott and Reginald Patrick Linstead was born on 18 October 1938 in London. Her parents met while working as science research students in London. Linstead's mother died of sepsis six days after giving birth, and Linstead was raised by a nanny until the age of 4, when her father remarried. Patrick Linstead was a prominent chemist.

Linstead studied performing arts at Francis Holland School in London and Cheltenham Ladies' College. She married Leon Stemler in 1962 and in 1963, their only child was born.

== Career ==
Linstead traveled to Australia while working as actress with an English touring company. She later was employed by International Casting Services as a casting director.

Linstead co-founded M&L Casting Consultants with Liz Mullinar. The company cast stage productions of Jesus Christ Superstar and Rocky Horror Show, as well as the Australian films My Brilliant Career (1970), Sunday Too Far Away (1975) and Picnic at Hanging Rock (1975).

In 1973, Linstead founded the first agency in Australia to represent a cross-section of talent required for performing arts. She produced The Elocution of Benjamin Franklin with the Nimord Theatre Company, starring Gordon Chater. The director was Richard Wherrett. It went on to play Off Broadway and the West End in London. The play was notable for having a gay protagonist.

In 1981, Linstead produced the documentary 14's Good, 18's Better with Gillian Armstrong and Tim Read. The film was directed by Armstrong. Heatwave was the first feature film she produced. Phil Noyce was its director. The children's film Molly starring Claudia Karvan followed.

M&L Casting Consultants closed in 1985, and Linstead partnered with Viccy Harper to form Hilary Linstead & Associates. Jean Kittson and Wendy Harmer, were among the performers they represented. Andrew Bovell and Louis Nowra were among their writers.

Between 1985 and 1995, Linstead was the producer of Buzz and Pardon Me Boys stage productions. For The Castanet Club, she was the film's associate producer and Neil Armfield was the director. Linstead produced Bootmen (2000), and its inspiration, Tap Dogs by Dein Perry (creator and director).

== Later life and death ==
In 2000, Hilary Linstead & Associates was sold and became HLA Management. It is now managed by Kate Richter, whom Linstead mentored.

She and Elizabeth Davies, her friend, wrote Growing Old Outrageously, a memoir of Linstead's life, in 2013. The book was published by Allen & Unwin.

In 2018, Linstead's health began to decline and she was diagnosed with leukemia. She died in her home on 5 August 2022.

== Filmography ==
=== As producer ===
- Fourteen's Good, Eighteen's Better (1981)
- Night of Shadows (1982; short)
- Heatwave (1982)
- Molly (1983)
- The Castanet Club (1991)
- Bootmen (2000)

=== As casting director ===
- The Irishman (1978)
- Blue Fin (1978)
- My Brilliant Career (1979)
- The Everlasting Secret Family (1988)
- Princess Kate (1988)
