= Owen Saunders =

English mathematician, academic and university administrator

Sir Owen Alfred Saunders, FREng, FRS (24 September 1904 – 10 October 1993) was an English applied mathematician, engineering science academic, and university administrator.

== Early life ==
Owen Saunders was born in Streatham, London, the only son of Alfred George Saunders, an engineer, and Margaret Ellen Saunders (née Jones). Saunders was educated at Emanuel School in south London (1913–19). He attained a general science degree from Birkbeck College, London (1921–23) and went on to study at Trinity College, Cambridge.

== Career ==
From 1926 to 1932, Saunders started work as a scientific officer at the Fuel Research Station, part of the Department of Scientific and Industrial Research, in Greenwich. He continued his studies in parallel, gaining a first class BSc in special mathematics and an MSc in physics. He collaborated with Margaret Fishenden and C. H. Lander throughout their careers

In 1932, Saunders joined Imperial College as a lecturer in the Department of Mechanical Engineering. In 1937, he became the first Clothworkers Reader in Thermodynamics. He researched aircraft piston engines and jet engines. In 1942, during World War II, he joined the Ministry of Aircraft Production. He undertook research into turbine engines, working with Sir Harold Roxbee Cox and Sir Frank Whittle. In 1946, he returned to Imperial College as Professor and Head of the Department of Mechanical Engineering.

Between 1964 and 1966, Saunders was the Dean of the City and Guilds College. In 1966, he became Acting Rector of Imperial College after the sudden death of Sir Patrick Linstead, then the Rector. From 1967 to 1969, he was the Vice-Chancellor of the University of London. In 1985, as Chairman of the Board of Governors of the Royal Holloway College, he oversaw its merger with Bedford College.

== Honours ==
Saunders was a Fellow of the Royal Society (elected 1958) and the Royal Academy of Engineering. He was President of the Institution of Mechanical Engineers in 1960 and was made an Honorary Fellow in 1965. He was created a Knight Bachelor for his services in 1965. He won the Max Jakob Memorial Award in 1966.

== Personal life ==
Owen Saunders married Marion McKechney in 1935 and they had three children. After her death in 1981, he married Daphne Holmes. He was a full member of The Magic Circle. He died in Reigate, Surrey.

== See also ==
- List of vice-chancellors of the University of London

Academic offices
Preceded by Patrick Linstead	Acting Rector of Imperial College London; 1966–1967	Succeeded by William Penney
Preceded by Sir Thomas Percival Creed	Vice-Chancellor of the University of London; 1967–1969	Succeeded by Professor Sir Brian Windeyer
