= Molly (1983 film) =

- Film poster
- Directed by: Ned Lander
- Written by: Ned Lander; Hilary Linstead; Phillip Roope; Mark Thomas
- Produced by: Hilary Linstead
- Starring: Claudia Karvan; Garry McDonald; Reg Lye
- Cinematography: Vincent Monton
- Edited by: Stewart Young
- Distributed by: Umbrella Entertainment
- Release date: April 27, 1983
- Running time: 88 minutes
- Country: Australia
- Language: English
- Budget: A$1 million
- Box office: A$188,000 (Australia)

Molly is a 1983 Australian family film about a singing dog which marked the acting debut of Claudia Karvan.

== Plot ==
When weary Old Dan collapses at Sydney Central Railway Station, he entrusts his beloved dog Molly to young Maxie. Maxie takes up the challenge, developing a soft spot for her special new companion - a dog with the rare ability to sing in tune.

== Cast ==
- Claudia Karvan as Maxie Ireland
- Les Dayman as Bill Ireland
- Reg Lye as Old Dan
- Garry McDonald as Jones
- Ruth Cracknell as Mrs Reach
- Robin Laurie as Stella
- Molly as herself
- Jake Blundell as Rudi
- Tanya Lester as Gina
- Mic Conway as Neville
- Jim Conway as Roy
- Slim de Grey as Tommy
- Mercia Deane-Johns as Talent Agent
- Lucky Grills as Dogcatcher
- Kerry Dwyer as Sister Carmel
- Noelene Brown

== Production ==
Molly was a real life singing dog owned by Phillip Roope who would appear on the Mike Walsh television show. The movie was originally budgeted at $500,000 but that grew as the filmmakers became more ambitious. Filming was difficult, with much rewriting on set.
