= The Great Bookie Robbery =

1986 TV mini-series

- Written by: Philip Cornford
- Directed by: Marcus Cole; Mark Joffe
- Starring: John Bach; Catherine Wilkin; Gary Day
- Country of origin: Australia
- Original language: English
- No. of episodes: 3

Production
- Producer: Ian Bradley
- Cinematography: Ellery Ryan
- Running time: 6 hours

Original release
- Network: Nine Network
- Release: 15 September – 17 September 1986

The Great Bookie Robbery is a 1986 Australian mini series about a 1976 crime known as the Great Bookie Robbery. It aired over three consecutive nights from the 15th to 17 September.

== Plot ==
A group of men, led by veteran bank robber Mike Power on temporary release from Parkhurst Prison in the UK, plan Australia's biggest heist. After meticulous planning, they hold up Melbourne’s Victoria Sports Club, where bookies bring their cash, escaping with millions of dollars. Pulling it off proves far more challenging than anticipated, as they struggle to evade the law, corrupt cops and underworld figures, all wanting a share.

== Cast ==
- John Bach as Mike Power
- Catherine Wilkin as Carol Power
- Gary Day as Col Reynolds
- Bruno Lawrence as Cracka Park
- Andy Anderson as Tony Lott
- Gary Sweet as Chicka White
- Candy Raymond as Sonya Reynolds
- Madeleine Blackwell as Anne Marks
- George Spartels as Jaffa Davis
- Arianthe Galani as Mrs Davis
- Paul Sonkkila as Merv Temple
- Frank Gallacher as Inspt. Castleway
- Dennis Miller as Edwards
- Tim McKenzie as Det. Ross
- Margie McCrae as Wendy Lott
- Conor McDermottroe as Red Collins
- Peter Cummins as Father Moore
- Feon Keane as David Power
- Denis Moore as Rusee Lockhart
- Frank Wilson as Winton Bathurst
- Alan David Lee as Det. Sgt. Townsend
- Scott Burgess as Les 'Robbo' Robbins
- Ray Meagher as Bob Temple
- Mary-Anne Fahey as Cheryl
- Rebecca Gibney as Bonnie
- Ross Newton as Police Officer
- Dennis Miller as Edwards
- Marty Fields

== Reception ==
The series got modest ratings figures but won its timeslot over the three nights, peaking at 22, 21 and 20 respectively. The series won best mini-series and best direction at the 1987 AFI Awards.

Anthony Dennis of The Sydney Morning Herald wrote a mixed review stating "It is smartlymade with spotless acting, the mandatory gratuitous violence (done with a degree of style), and a thoughtful use of the mundane urban locations. However, it does lack the intrigue involved in the planning of the crime. There's a feeling that reading press clippings from the day is more compelling than watching the series." Richard Coleman also of The Sydney Morning Herald gave it a positive review concluding "We've seen some excellent cop shows this year in Widows and Edge of Darkness. The Great Bookie Robbery was in the same class."

== Awards ==
- 1987 AFI Awards
  - Best Mini-Series - Ian Bradley - Won
  - Best Direction in a Mini Series - Marcus Cole, Mark Joffe - Won
  - Best Performance by an Actress in a Mini Series - Catherine Wilkin - Nominated
  - Best Mini-Series Screenplay - Philip Cornford, Ian Bradley - Nominated
