= Deadly (film) =

- Directed by: Esben Storm
- Written by: Esben Storm; Richard Moir; Raland Allen
- Produced by: Richard Moir
- Starring: Jerome Ehlers; John Moore; Lydia Miller; Frank Gallacher; Caz Lederman
- Cinematography: Geoffrey Simpson
- Edited by: Ralph Strasser
- Music by: Graeme Revell
- Production companies: Beyond Films; Moirstorm Productions; Deadly Productions; Australian Film Finance Corporation
- Distributed by: Hoyts-Fox-Columbia TriStar Films
- Release dates: June 1991 (MystFest); 13 August 1992 (Australia)
- Running time: 99 minutes
- Country: Australia
- Language: English
- Budget: A$4 million
- Box office: A$25,421 (Australia)

Deadly is a 1991 Australian film directed by Esben Storm.

== Cast ==
- Jerome Ehlers as Tony Bourke
- Frank Gallacher as Mick Thornton
- Lydia Miller as Daphne
- John Moore as Eddie
- Caz Lederman as Irene
- Alan David Lee as Constable Barry Blainey
- Tony Barry as Deputy Commissioner Graham Stewart
- Julie Nihill as Jenny
- Martin Vaughan as Doctor Ward
- Bill Hunter as Vernon Giles
- Bruce Venables as Archie
- Lillian Crombie as Sally
- Steve Dodd as Kummengu
- Esben Storm as Reporter
- John Gregg as Minister

== Production ==
Storm first wrote the script in 1987. He wanted to tell the story of Aboriginal deaths in custody and chose a thriller format to get financing and to make the movie as accessible as possible.

The movie was shot on location in Wilcannia over seven weeks. It was the first of five features funded by the Film Finance Corporation's Film Trust Fund.

== Plot ==
The UK VHS slick for the movie reads: "Streetwise cop Tony Bourke is sent to a small town to complete a routine report on the death of Jimmie Bryant found hanging whilst in police custody. His orders are clear – keep the affair away from the media and close the case within 24 hours. The local police claim that Bryant committed suicide but the investigation exposes a number of inconsistencies in their story. In the face of growing suspicion and hostility Bourke befriends the victim’s brother – his cellmate on the night of the killing. Together they are determined to see justice prevail … at any cost.

== Release ==
Ozmovies reported: "The film was given a brief outing in a few Hoyts cinemas, beginning in Sydney on 13 August 1992 and the same day in Hoyts Melbourne... The film received mixed to negative reviews in its limited domestic theatrical release."

== Reception ==
Lynden Barber in The Sydney Morning Herald wrote "Whatever the failings of Deadly, a timely thriller based around the issue of black deaths in custody, the film can’t be accused of lack of courage" and finishes: "Apart from prosaic direction, the film’s major problem is the flagrant miscasting of the central role, with Jerome Ehlers lacking even a hint of the presence needed to lift the story into viewers' emotions. It’s galling to find a film as potentially strong as this ruined by careless decision making. But the "she'll be right" mentality obviously dies hard." The Age's Neil Jillett begins: "Although it is about the suicide or murder of a jailed Aborigine, Deadly is a fairly standard thriller rather than an attempt to examine the issue of black deaths in custody. The film, written and directed by Esben Storm, has some high quality moments, but it is another case of a half-baked Australian script being made worse by inadequate direction." In The Weekend Australian, Evan Williams said: "In many ways the film is impressive. It is sharply edited, well acted and the characters, even if overdrawn, are interesting examples of how we see our own stereotypes. But how much better it might have been if Storm had been content to make a simple police thriller with dark social implications rather than a comprehensive treatise on race relations." Paul LePetit from The Sunday Telegraph wrote: "Sadly, Esben Storm’s well-intentioned film does not carry the conviction that it should with unconvincing plot twists and a poorly-judged performance from Jerome Ehlers."

== Awards ==
Year	Award	Category	Result	Ref
1991	1991 Australian Film Institute Awards	Best Performance by an Actor in a Supporting Role (John Moore)	Nominated	
1991	1991 Australian Film Institute Awards	Best Achievement in Production Design (Peta Lawson)	Nominated	
