= Journey Among Women =

- Film poster
- Directed by: Tom Cowan
- Written by: Tom Cowan; John Weiley; Dorothy Hewett
- Produced by: John Weiley
- Starring: Jeune Pritchard; Nell Campbell
- Cinematography: Tom Cowan
- Edited by: John Scott
- Music by: Roy Ritchie
- Production company: Ko-An Film Productions
- Distributed by: Greater Union
- Release date: 18 August 1977
- Running time: 83 mins
- Country: Australia
- Language: English
- Budget: A$150,000 or $170,000
- Box office: A$800,000 (Australia)

Journey Among Women is a 1977 Australian film directed by Tom Cowan.

== Plot ==
In colonial Australia, refined Elizabeth Harrington, daughter of the judge advocate and engaged to Captain McEwan, decides to help female convicts who are living in appalling conditions. The women manage to escape and Elizabeth goes with them. An aboriginal girl, Kameragul, shows them how to survive in the bush but Elizabeth almost dies of malnutrition. A convict, Emily, nurses her back to health.

Months pass, and Emily is raped and killed by two men. Elizabeth leads the other convicts in a revenge attack against the men. Captain McEwan leads an attack on the women, in which he is killed. Elizabeth returns to her old life.

== Cast ==
- Jeune Pritchard as Elizabeth Harrington
- Nell Campbell as Meg
- Diana Fuller as Bess
- Lisa Peers as Charlotte
- Jude Kuring as Grace
- Robyn Moase as Moira
- Michelle Johnson as Bridget
- Rose Lilley as Emily
- Lillian Crombie as Kameragul
- Therese Jack as Kate
- Kay Self as Sheila
- Helenka Link as Jane
- Ralph Cotterill as Corporal Porteus
- Martin Phelan as Captain Richard McEwan
- Tim Elliot as Doctor Hargreaves

== Production ==
The film was an original idea of Cowan's:

I was living in the bush, in Berowra Waters, and it was so powerful. I happened to read this French science-fiction story called Les Guerrieres about a future society of women - like an Amazon society - who were at war with the rest of society. Somehow in the combination of the wildness and strangeness and beauty of the bush and this story of wild women, I saw a parallel in how we perceived the bush and how the British first saw the bush as ugly. Well, we now see it as beautiful. And how the sort of excesses of radical feminism, when it began, were seen as ugly - ranting and raving and being abusive and so on. But, in fact, behind it were very beautiful things - not just the women, but the humanist ideas.

Cowan wrote the screenplay with producer John Wiley and playwright Dorothy Hewett. Funding came from private investment, the Australian Film Commission and a $25,000 grant from the Experimental Film Fund.

The film was shot over six weeks in 1976 near Berowra, north of Sydney, on 16mm. Shooting was a turbulent experience, in part because everyone was living together on location and there were fierce arguments between Cowan and the cast over the direction the film was taking.

Post-production took eighteen months and the film was blown up from 16mm to 35mm. Four minutes were taking out of the film after its premiere at the Cannes Film Festival.

== Release ==
The film was a success at the box office, in part because of its nudity and lesbian scenes.

Tom Cowan won a special award for "creativity" at the 1977 AFI awards.
