= Patrick Linstead =

English chemist (1902–1966)

Sir Patrick Linstead CBE FRS
- 1945 portrait by Walter Stoneman
- Born: Reginald Patrick Linstead; 28 August 1902; London, England
- Died: 22 September 1966 (aged 64); London, England
- Education: Imperial College London
- Spouses: Aileen Rowland (m. 1929; died 1938); Marjorie Walters (m. 1942)
- Children: Hilary Linstead
- Awards: Fellow of the Royal Society
- Scientific career
- Fields: Chemistry
- Workplaces: University of Sheffield; Harvard University
- Doctoral advisors: Jocelyn Field Thorpe

Sir Reginald Patrick Linstead (28 August 1902 – 22 September 1966) was an English chemist.

== Background ==
Patrick Linstead was born on 28 August 1902 in Southgate, London, the second son of Edward Flatman Linstead, advertising manager for Burroughs Wellcome, and Florence Evelyn, née Hester. After primary education in Southgate, Linstead attended the City of London School from the age of 11 to 17, where the science master, George H J Adlam, was a considerable influence. He joined Imperial College London in 1920, and graduated three years later with first class honours, before continuing to a PhD in Sir Jocelyn Thorpe's group.

== Career ==
In 1929, Linstead was appointed as a demonstrator at Imperial, and later lecturer. In the following decade, he was awarded a DSc and three medals. In 1938 he was appointed Professor Chemistry at the University of Sheffield.

In their obituary of Linstead, Barton, Rydon and Elvidge wrote that "Linstead's professional life divides itself conveniently into four periods", which they go on to describe in detail:

The First Period at Imperial College, 1920–1938
The Years in Between, 1938–1949
The Second Period at Imperial College, 1949–1954
The Years as Rector, 1955–1966

Linstead Hall at Imperial College is named in his honour. He was made a Fellow of the Royal Society in 1940. He was also a Commander of the Order of the British Empire (CBE) and was knighted in 1959.

Patrick Linstead can be heard in a speech at the Mansion House dinner celebrating the 50th anniversary of the College in 1957.

== Personal life and death ==
In 1929, Linstead married Aileen Edith Ellis Rowland. She died in 1938, after giving birth to their first child, Hilary. She married Leon Max Stemler of Newcastle, New South Wales at Holy Trinity Church, South Kensington in 1962, and moved to Australia with her husband.

His second marriage was in Aberdare on 11 July 1942, to Marjorie Walters, a DPhil from Somerville College, Oxford. They had no children. Lady Linstead died at their Blockley home in Gloucestershire on 2 November 1987. They also had one at 170 Queens Gate, SW7, a short walk from Imperial College.

Sir Patrick Linstead died from a heart attack on 22 September 1966 at St George's Hospital, which was then on the site of the present Lanesborough Hotel at Hyde Park Corner. A memorial service was held on 25 October at Holy Trinity Brompton.

Academic offices
Preceded by Roderic Hill	Rector of Imperial College London; 1954–1966	Succeeded by Owen Saunders
