= Robert McDarra =

Australian actor (1931–1975)

- Born: Robert Bundy McDarra; 1931; Sydney, New South Wales, Australia
- Died: 23 December 1975 (aged 43–44); Sydney, New South Wales
- Other names: Robert McDara, Bob McDara, Bob McDarra
- Occupation: Actor
- Years active: 1951–1975
- Known for: 27A (1974)
- Awards: 1974 Australian Film Institute Award for Best Actor in a Leading Role

Robert Bundy McDarra (1931– 23 December 1975) variously credited as Robert McDara and Bob McDara was an Australian stage, television, film and radio actor.

== Career ==
McDarra began his acting career in the 1950s, performing on stage with Sydney's Independent Theatre. In 1959, he appeared in Julius Caesar with the Australian Elizabethan Theatre Trust.

Together with Edward Hepple, Terry McDermott, Walter Sullivan and Ben Gabriel, McDarra was a founding member of the original Q Theatre project in 1963, which, before expanding and moving to Penrith, was a venue offering short plays to office workers at the AMP Theatrette at Sydney's Circular Quay over lunch times.

McDarra appeared in 1971 film Walkabout alongside Jenny Agutter, David Gulpilil and John Meillon.

McDarra won the 1974 AACTA Award for Best Actor in a Leading Role for his performance in the film 27A, as Bill Donald, an alcoholic imprisoned in a Queensland psychiatric hospital.

McDarra also appeared on television, with his role in You Can’t See ‘Round Corners and guest appearances in Homicide, Division 4, Matlock Police, The Stranger (1964) and Ryan (1973). He also had regular roles in radio serials Blue Hills and Dad and Dave.

His final film appearance was in Mad Dog Morgan (1976), which he finished working on shortly before his death.

== Death ==
McDarra died on 23 December 1975, at the age of 44, in Sydney, after a long battle with an unspecified illness.

== Awards ==
Year	Work	A Ward	Category	Result	Ref
1974	27A	Australian Film Institute Awards	AACTA Award for Best Actor in a Leading Role	Won	
	27A	Hoyts Award	Best Actor	Won	

== Filmography ==
=== Film ===
Year	Title	Role	Notes	Ref
1966	They're a Weird Mob	Hotel Clerk (uncredited)	Feature film	
1971	Walkabout	Man	Feature film	
1971	Wake in Fright	Pig Eyes	Feature film	
1974	Moving On	Financier	Feature film	
1974	27A	Billy McDonald	Feature film Won AACTA Award for Best Actor in a Leading Role	
1976	Mad Dog Morgan	Parole Officer	Feature film	
1978	Rate of Exchange		Short film (released posthumously)	

=== Television ===
Year	Title	Role	Notes	Ref
1959	Act of Violence		TV play	
1961	The Story of Peter Grey	Paul		
1961	Traveller Without Luggage	Psychiatrist	TV movie	
1963	Time Out	Bernhardt Holtermann	1 episode	
1963	The Hungry Ones	Warden	Miniseries, 1 episode	
1963	Ballad for One Gun	Mr Curnow	TV play	
1964	The Stranger	Squadron Leader	Miniseries, 1 episode	
1964	The One That Got Away		TV movie	
1964–1972	Homicide	Ted Lewis / Roy Mitchell / Harold Roper	3 episodes	
1965	Rusty Bugles	Sergeant Brooks	TV play	
1965	The Recruiting Officer	Scruple	TV play	
1965	Adventure Unlimited	Father Raymond	1 episode	
1967	Contrabandits	Pilch	1 episode	
1967	Love and War	Liam Lyons	Miniseries, 1 episode	
1967	All Fall Down	Ray	TV play (episode of Australian Playhouse)	
1967	You Can’t See ‘Round Corners		4 episodes	
1967–1968	My Name's McGooley, What's Yours?	Donk Rogers	5 episodes	
1968	Rita and Wally		1 episode	
1968	Hunter	Jonathan Monk / Bruno Silvermann / Josef Vortak	3 episodes	
1969	Riptide	First Officer English	1 episode	
1969–1974	Division 4	Vince Morgan / Eddie Rosolino / George Evans / Willie Espinall	4 episodes	
1971	Dead Men Running		Miniseries, 1 episode	
1971; 1976	Matlock Police	Thomson Kelly / Frank Hayes	2 episodes	
1972	Snake Gully with Dad and Dave	Bill Smith	Miniseries, 8 episodes	
1972	The Spoiler	Joey Boy	1 episode	
1973	Ryan	Graham Anderson	1 episode	
1976	Luke's Kingdom	Bando	Miniseries, 1 episode	

== Radio ==
Year	Title	Role	Notes	Ref
1954	Dangerous Assignment	Sgt. Ranzo	Episode: "Maples"	
1954–1955	Fat Man		Radio series	
1956	Old Heidelberg	Bilz	Radio play	
1958	The Rivals	Acres	Radio play	
1959	Eleventh Hour	Lucia	Episode: "Highly Explosive"	
1961	Cattleman	Charlie Turner	Radio series	
1961–1962	Interpol Confidential		Radio series	
1962	Dr Paul		Radio series	
1967	The Sinners of Sonoma		Radio series	
	Blue Hills		Radio series	
	Dad and Dave		Radio series	
	Partners in Jeopardy	Calvin Calbert	Radio series	
	The Hidden Truth		Radio series	
	For Infamous Conduct		Radio series	
	Remember Miranda	Harvey Trent		

== Theatre ==
Year	Title	Role	Notes	Ref
1951	An Angel Came		Theatre Royal Sydney with J. C. Williamson's	
1955	A Midsummer Night's Dream		Independent Theatre, Sydney	
1955	Winter Journey		Independent Theatre, Sydney	
1956	The Firstborn	Moses	Independent Theatre, Sydney with The Workshop Group	
1957	My Spare Lady		University of Sydney	
1957	Macbeth	Banquo	Independent Theatre, Sydney	
1957	The Lark	The Dauphin	Independent Theatre, Sydney	
1958	Under Milk Wood	Captain Cat	Independent Theatre, Sydney	
1958	Titus Andronicus		Independent Theatre, Sydney	
1959	Career		Independent Theatre, Sydney	
1959	Julius Caesar	A Soothsayer / Young Cato	Elizabethan Theatre, Sydney	
1959	Fire on the Wind		National Theatre, Launceston, University of Adelaide, Playhouse, Perth, Her Majesty's Theatre, Brisbane	
1960	The Rape of the Belt	Zeus	Elizabethan Theatre, Sydney	
1960	Murder in the Cathedral	Third Priest	University of Adelaide	
1960	Ah, Wilderness!		Elizabethan Theatre, Sydney	
1961	Galileo	The Cardinal	Independent Theatre, Sydney	
1961	Phaedra		Independent Theatre, Sydney	
1962	The Caretaker	Aston	Independent Theatre, Sydney	
1962	One Way Pendulum	Producer	Independent Theatre, Sydney	
1963	Hamlet		UNSW, Old Tote Theatre, Sydney	
1963	The Dumb Waiter		AMP Theatrette, Sydney with Q Theatre Co	
1964	George	Producer	AMP Theatrette, Sydney	
1964	Henry V	The Dauphine	Tent Theatre, Adelaide, Tent Theatre, Sydney	
1964	The End of The Beginning		AMP Theatrette, Sydney with Q Theatre Co	
1965	The Country Wife		UNSW Old Tote Theatre, Sydney	
1965	The Representative	Kurt Gerstein	UNSW Old Tote Theatre, Sydney	
1965	Othello		UNSW Old Tote Theatre, Sydney	
1966	Three Sisters		Old Tote Theatre, Sydney	
1967	The Collection		AMP Theatrette, Sydney with Q Theatre Co	
1968	Murder in the Cathedral		University of Adelaide	
1971	A Break in the Music		Independent Theatre, Sydney	
