= Players to the Gallery =

- Written by: Roger Simpson
- Directed by: Brian Bell
- Starring: Peter Sumner; Kate Fitzpatrick; Richard Moir
- Country of origin: Australia
- Original language: English
- No. of episodes: 3 x 1 hour

Original release
- Network: ABC
- Release: 23 March 1980

Players to the Gallery is a 1980 mini series about a lawyer who divorces his wife.

== Cast ==
- Peter Sumner as Simon Harris
- Kate Fitzpatrick as Kate Harris
- Richard Moir as David
- John Gaden
- Tracy Mann
- Anna Volska
- Tony Bonner
- Philip Hinton
- Sigrid Thornton
- Elisabeth Kirkby
