= Computer Ghosts =

- Directed by: Marcus Cole
- Produced by: Jan Tyrrell
- Starring: Nicholas Ryan; Emily Symons; Peter Whitford
- Music by: Chris Neal
- Production company: Somerset Film Productions
- Release date: 24 June 1988
- Running time: 90 mins
- Country: Australia
- Language: English

Computer Ghosts is a 1987 Australian film. It was shot under the titles Crooksnatchers and Hold the Circus.

== Cast ==
- Nicholas Ryan as Harlan
- Emily Symons as Anya
- Peter Whitford as Uncle Oscar
- Robbie McGregor as David
- Christine Jetson as Audrey
- Scott Burgess as 'Ras' Cal
- George Spartels as 'Pi' Wratich
- Benita Collings as Eva
