= Esben Storm =

Australian actor, director (1950–2011)

- Born: 26 May 1950; Støvring, Denmark
- Died: 28 March 2011 (aged 60); Sydney, New South Wales, Australia
- Education: University High School, Melbourne; Swinburne Technical College
- Occupations: Actor; screenwriter; producer; director; voice artist; songwriter
- Years active: 1969–2008
- Spouse(s): Pamela Barnetta (m. 197?; div. 19??); Lisa Meagher (m. 199?)
- Children: 2

Esben Storm (26 May 1950– 28 March 2011) was a Danish Australian actor, screenwriter, television producer, television director, voice artist and songwriter.

== Early life ==
Storm was raised on a farm in Denmark, by working-class parents Laurits and Ane. The family migrated to Australia in 1958, when Storm was eight, after Laurits lost the family farm to lawyers. After settling in Melbourne, his father worked as a builder's labourer and built a darkroom, where Storm learned photographic processing, composition and lighting.

Storm met schoolfriend Haydn Keenan while studying at University High School, Melbourne, and moved to Sydney in 1970, where he worked worked with Keenan as a production assistant at the Commonwealth Film Unit (Film Australia), before going on to make films together, in what would become a long-term partnership.

In 1969, Storm enrolled in the film course at Swinburne Technical College, studying alongside Gillian Armstrong.

== Career ==
=== Film making ===
Together with Haydn Keenan, Storm began making a series of award-winning films, under their production company, Smart Street Films. Their first film was the 1969 short, Doors, directed by Storm, followed by the documentary In His Prime, which he also directed, winning an award at the 1972 Sydney Film Festival. Then came the low-budget 1974 feature 27A. Directed by Storm, it won the AFI Award for Best Film that year, establishing him as a key player in Australian cinema.

Establishing Storm Productions, Storm wrote and directed 1978 feature film In Search of Anna, with film stills and publicity shots by his then-girlfriend Carol Jerrems. The film won the 1978 AFI Award for Best Screenplay. He went on to direct and produce 1983 documentary With Prejudice, about the 1978 Sydney Hilton Hotel bombing. The film was attributed with helping secure the release of the three Ananda Marga members jailed for the crime.

Other films he wrote and directed included 1984 comedy Stanley, 1991 film Deadly, starring Bill Hunter and 2003 sci-fi horror film Subterano, starring Alex Dimitriades and Tasma Walton. He also made several documentaries including The Tasty Bust Reunion and America.

Storm was well known for his work with the Australian Children's Television Foundation (ACTF), where for 15 years, he wrote, directed, edited and acted in numerous programs and played a pivotal role in most of the 62 national and international awards the foundation has received. He directed an episode of the ACTF’s very first series, Winners, followed by Devil’s Hill – the Tasmanian telemovie in children's anthology series Touch the Sun, which was created to coincide with the bicentenary in 1988.

Most notably, Storm put Australian children’s drama on the map with Round the Twist, ACTF's most successful children's series, in which he brought Paul Jennings' short stories to life. Working with Jennings on the scripts, he directed more than half of the episodes of the first two seasons, and also played the part of Mr Snapper. Since its release, the series has been translated into countless languages and screened around the world including on the BBC and on Fox in the US.

Further ACTF titles Storm worked on included More Winners (1990), The Genie from Down Under (1995–1998) and Crash Zone (1998–1999). He also worked on Sky Trackers (as script consultant), Li'l Elvis Jones and the Truckstoppers (as the show's creator, scriptwriter and dialogue director) and Blue Heelers (as a director). In 2007, under his company Storm Productions, Storm wrote, directed and produced SBS series Kick, also acting in the show.

For many years, Storm worked to adapt John Marsden's Tomorrow, When the War Began young adult novel, but lost the rights to the subsequent film.

=== Acting ===
In 1976, Storm acted in Hanging About, a short film by Carol Jerrems. He later played the part of a record producer in 1982 drama film Monkey Grip and the following year he appeared in Going Down, playing the role of Michael, a codeine-addicted loner-writer.

He had further film roles in 1985, with romantic comedy The Coca-Cola Kid opposite Eric Roberts and Greta Scacchi, drama film Wrong World and TV movie I Live with Me Dad. The following year he then played the role of Raymond 'Frog' Gardiner in miniseries Alice to Nowhere.

In 1987, Storm featured in comedy film Les Patterson Saves the World, playing a Russian scientist, alongside Barry Humphries and Pandemonium in the role of E.B. De Woolf. The following year, he played Wilbur Wright in comedy film Young Einstein starring Yahoo Serious and appeared in biographical TV movie The Riddle of the Stinson with Jack Thompson and Richard Roxburgh. He also performed opposite Steve Bisley in 1988 post-apocalyptic TV movie Hard Knuckle.

Storm appeared in three episodes of children's anthology series Winners. He also played the regular role of haughty Mr Snapper in Round the Twist. He had guest roles in Rafferty's Rules; crime drama Phoenix; period drama Snowy River: The McGregor Saga; Good Guys, Bad Guys; and police procedural series Blue Heelers. His final acting role was in medical drama series All Saints.

== Personal life ==
In the 1970s, Storm was in a relationship with photographer and filmmaker Carol Jerrems, who lived with him in Willoughby. His contribution to ABC biographical documentary film Girl in a Mirror became the foundation for a story honouring Jerrems, who died of a rare illness in 1980, at the age of 30.

After returning from Cannes screenings for his 1978 film In Search of Anna, he met and then married the film's assistant editor, Pamela Barnetta.

Storm's first marriage broke down, and he later married costume designer Lisa Meagher, whom he met on the set of Round the Twist. She was his partner at the time of his death. He has two children – a son and a daughter.

== Death ==
Storm died, aged 60, on 28 March 2011 from a heart attack. Numerous directors, producers, actors and screen industry leaders attended his funeral at Clovelly Bowling Club in Sydney, which was MC'd by longtime friend, collaborator and producer Allan Hogan. Storm's partner Lisa Meagher, delivered his eulogy, revealing it was the same one Esben had written for his father's funeral.

== Filmography ==
=== Short film ===
==== As crew ====
Year	Title	Role	Ref.
1969	Doors	Director	
1972	In His Prime	Director	
1972	Gentle Strangers	Production assistant	
1973	A Motion Picture	Director	
1973	Flashpoint	Production assistant	
1973	Floating This Time	Editor	
1975	Grace Crowley	Director	
1975	A Handful of Dust	Unspecified assistant	
1984	The Other Facts of Life	Director	
1994	Diablo is Done For	Director	

==== As actor ====
Year	Title	Role	Ref.
1969	Doors		
1971	One Man Bike		
1972	In His Prime		
1972	Stephany		
1972	A Motion Picture		
1976	Hanging About: A Short Film by Carol Jerrems		
1981	Making Weekend of Summer Last	Out of Work Actor	
1982	Last Breakfast in Paradise		
1982	Greetings from Wollongong		

=== Feature film ===
==== As crew ====
Year	Title	Director	Writer	Producer	Editor	Notes	Ref.
1973	Avengers of the Reef	No	No	No	No	Production manager	
1974	27A	Yes	Yes	No	Yes		
1978	In Search of Anna	Yes	Yes	Yes	No		
1982	With Prejudice	Yes	No	No	No		
1984	Stanley	Yes	Yes	No	No		
1990	The Crossing	No	No	No	No	Story consultant	
1991	Deadly	Yes	Yes	No	No		
1992	de Vil's tas Mania (aka Three Cornered Island)	No	No	No	No	Also script advisor	
2003	Subterano	Yes	Yes	No	No		
2004	The Tasty Bust Reunion	No	Yes	Yes	No	Documentary film	
	America	Yes				Documentary film	
2006	The Bridge at Midnight Trembles	Yes	Yes	Yes	Yes	Documentary film; Also executive producer	
2008	Goodbye Revolution	Yes	Yes	Yes	Yes	Documentary film; Also director of photography	
2012	Aspects of a Life: Working with Indigenous Australians	No	No	No	Yes	Video documentary	

==== As actor ====
Year	Title	Role	Notes	Ref.
1982	Monkey Grip	Record Producer		
1982	Going Down	Michael		
1983	Birthin' Hips			
1983	With Prejudice		Documentary film	
1984	Stanley	Menswear Attendant		
1985	Wrong World	Lawrence		
1985	The Coca-Cola Kid	Country Hotel Manager		
1987	Les Patterson Saves the World	Russian Scientist		
1987	Pandemonium	E.B. De Woolf / Husband		
1988	Young Einstein	Wilbur Wright		
1991	Deadly	Reporter		
1993	Terrormisu: A Night of Just Desserts			
1993	Rusty & the Bathtub Banana			
2008	Goodbye Revolution	Narrator	Documentary film	

=== Television ===
==== As crew ====
Year	Title	Director	Writer	Producer	Script consultant	Notes	Ref.
1985	Winners	Yes	No	No	No	Episode: "The Other Facts of Life"	
1988	Touch the Sun: Devil’s Hill	Yes	No	No	No	TV movie	
1990	More Winners	Yes	No	No	No	Episode: "The Big Wish"	
1989–2001	Round the Twist	Yes	Yes	No	Yes	32 episodes (director); 30 episodes (writer); Also script consultant	
1994	Sky Trackers	No	No	No	Yes	26 episodes	
1994	The Bob Morrison Show	Yes	No	No	No	Season 1	
1995	Blue Heelers	Yes	No	No	No	4 episodes	
1996; 1998	The Genie from Down Under	Yes	Yes	No	No	6 episodes (director); 15 episodes (writer)	
1998	Li'l Elvis and the Truckstoppers	No	Yes	No	No	Episode: "Caught in a Trap"; Also creator, scriptwriter & dialogue director	
1999	Crash Zone	Yes	No	No	No	Season 1, 4 episodes	
2000	Pig's Breakfast	Yes	No	No	No	Seasons 1–2	
2001	The Lost World	Yes	No	No	No	Episode: "True Spirit"	
2007	Kick	Yes	Yes	Yes	No	Also creator	

==== As actor ====
Year	Title	Role	Notes	Ref.
1984	Special Squad	Cox	Episode: "Brothers"	
1985	I Live with Me Dad	Blindman	TV movie	
1985; 1986	Winners	Leo George / Tom	2 episodes: "The Other Facts of Life" & "Room to Move"	
1986	Alice to Nowhere	Raymond 'Frog' Gardiner	Miniseries, 2 episodes	
1986	A Single Life	Paul	TV movie	
1987	The Fast Lane	Lester	Episode: "All the World's Going Through a Bit of a Stage"	
1988	The Riddle of the Stinson	Meissner	TV movie	
1988	Rafferty's Rules	Norm Angstrom	Episode: "Mum's the Word"	
1988	Hard Knuckle	Vince	TV movie	
1989–2000	Round the Twist	Mr Snapper	36 episodes	
1990	More Winners	The Waiter	Episode: "The Big Wish"	
1992	Phoenix	Pat	2 episodes	
1994	Law of the Land	Peter Bozavich	Episode: "Death Before Dying"	
1995	Blue Heelers	Colin Roper	Episode: "Breaking the Cycle"	
1995	Snowy River: The McGregor Saga	Frobisher	Episode: "In Duty Bound"	
1997	Good Guys Bad Guys: Only the Young Die Good	Jerry	TV movie	
2002	Don't Blame the Koalas (aka Don't Blame Me)	First AD	Episode: "A Star is Born"	
2007	Kick	Jeff Abbott (soccer referee)	Episode: "You Can't Stop the Music"	
2007	All Saints	Laszlo Shucs	Episode: "Echoes"	

=== Theatre ===
Year	Title	Role	Type	Ref.
1994; 1996	Anaheim Magic	Playwright	Lion Theatre, Adelaide, Malthouse Theatre, Melbourne with Magpie Theatre Company	

== Awards and nominations ==
Year	Title	Award	Category	Result	Ref.
1979	In Search of Anna	Australian Film Institute Awards	Best Screenplay	Won	
1979	In Search of Anna	Australian Film Institute Awards	Best Film	Nominated	
1979	In Search of Anna	Australian Film Institute Awards	Best Director	Nominated	
1991	Deadly	Mystfest	Best Film	Nominated	
1991	Winners: The Big Wish	Australian Film Institute Awards	Best Achievement in Direction in a TV Drama	Nominated	
1993	Round the Twist: Little Squirt	Australian Film Institute Awards	Best Screenplay in a TV Drama	Nominated	
1999	Crash Zone: The Dream Team	Australian Film Institute Awards	Best Direction in a TV Drama	Nominated	
