= Pandemonium (1987 film) =

- Film poster
- Directed by: Haydn Keenan
- Written by: Peter Gailey; Haydn Keenan
- Produced by: Alex Cutler; Haydn Keenan
- Starring: David Argue; Esben Storm; Gary Foley
- Cinematography: David Sanderson
- Edited by: Paul Healy
- Music by: Cameron Allan
- Release date: 1987
- Running time: 88 minutes
- Country: Australia
- Language: English
- Budget: A$600,000

Pandemonium is a 1987 Australian fantasy comedy horror film in the style of The Rocky Horror Picture Show.

== Plot synopsis ==
Raised by a family of dingoes, a young feral girl heads for Babylon, Australia to find her family, only to find that her mother is not all she seems.

== Cast ==
- Amanda Dole as the dingo girl
- David Argue as Kales Leadingham / Ding the Dingo
- Esben Storm as E. B. De Woolf / Husband
- Arna-Maria Winchester as P. B. De Woolf / Wife
- Lex Marinos as Dick Dickerson / Detective
- Ian Nimmo as Mr. David
- Mercia Deane-Johns as Morticia
- Haydn Keenan as Dr. Doctor

== Reception ==
Australian film critic Michael Adams later included Pandemonium on his list of the worst ever Australian films, along with Phantom Gold, The Glenrowan Affair, Houseboat Horror, Welcome to Woop Woop, Les Patterson Saves the World and The Pirate Movie.
