= Margaret Fishenden =

British meteorologist

Margaret White Fishenden
- Born: Margaret White; 24 February 1889; Altrincham, near Manchester
- Died: 21 October 1977 (aged 88); Goring, near Reading
- Occupations: Meteorologist; Industrial researcher
- Known for: Author of The coal fire industrial research
- Spouse: Richard Fishenden (married 1915 to 1932)
- Children: 1

Margaret White (24 February 1889 – 21 October 1977), also known as Margaret White Fishenden, was a British meteorologist and industrial researcher.

== Biography ==
Margaret Fishenden White was born in Altrincham, near Manchester on 24 February 1889 to organist Richard William White and Sarah Elizabeth White (née Broadbent) (b. 1852). She was the third of four children.

== Education ==
She was educated by governesses until being awarded a scholarship to attend Manchester Municipal Secondary School at the age of thirteen. In 1905 she gained a first-class matriculation which enabled her to enter the University of Manchester. She received the Higginbottom scholarship in 1907 and in 1909 graduated with a first-class honours degree in physics.

White obtained a Master of Science degree from the University of Manchester in 1910 and was elected Beyer fellow of the university. She was awarded a Doctorate of Science from the University of Manchester in 1919.

== Career ==
She lectured at the Howard Estate Observatory, Glossop, from 1910 to 1911 and then at the University of Manchester from 1911 to 1916. She was lecturer in charge of the meteorological department, where her research interest was atmospheric pollution.

In 1932 she also became an honorary lecturer in the department of engineering, mechanical and motive power at Imperial College London where she remained until she retired in 1957.

From 1916 to 1922 she was the head of Manchester Corporation's Air Pollution Advisory Board's research team. Her work during this time included the publication of The Coal Fire, the work for which she is best known.

In 1922 White moved to London where she worked alongside Dr C.H. Lander and O.A. Saunders under the Department of Scientific and Industrial Research. In 1932 when Lander accepted the chair of mechanical engineering at Imperial College, London University, both White and Saunders moved with him. She worked alongside both Lander and Saunders for much of her career.

In 1923 White was elected a fellow of the Institute of Physics.

In 1947 White became the only woman to reach the status of assistant professor and reader in applied heat at Imperial College.

As well as a strong academic link, White maintained links with industry throughout her career and served on fifteen industrial committees, two of which she chaired.

The Margaret Fishenden Centenary Memorial Prize is given in her memory to the best PhD thesis over the previous five year period at Imperial College.

== Personal life ==
White married Richard Bertie Fishenden (1880 - 1956) in 1915 and gave birth to her son, Richard Martin in 1917. In 1932 she divorced from Richard Fishenden and chose not to remarry.

White died in Goring, near Reading in 1977 at the age of 88.

== Selected bibliography ==
- White Fishenden, Margaret (1920). The Coal Fire: a research / by Margaret White Fishenden for the Manchester Corporation Air Pollution Advisory Board. London: Her Majesty's Stationery Office.
- White Fishenden, Margaret (1921) The Efficiency of Low Temperature Coke in Domestic Appliances. London. Her Majesty's Stationery Office.
- White Fishenden, Margaret (192e) The Domestic Grate (an experimental investigation of the relation between the design of a grate and the heat radiated into a room. London. Her Majesty's Stationery Office.
- White Fishenden, Margaret (1925) House Heating. H F & G Witherby
- White Fishenden, Margaret; Saunders, Owen Alfred (1950). An introduction to heat transfer / by M.Fishenden and O.A.Saunders. Oxford: Clarendon Press.
