= Subterano =

- Directed by: Esben Storm
- Written by: Esben Storm
- Produced by: Richard Becker; Barbi Taylor
- Starring: Alex Dimitriades; Tasma Walton; Alison Whyte; Chris Haywood
- Production company: Becker Entertainment
- Release date: January 28, 2003
- Running time: 91 minutes
- Country: Australia
- Language: English

Subterano is a 2003 Australian science fiction horror film directed by Esben Storm and starring Alex Dimitriades and Tasma Walton.

== Plot ==
People trapped in an underground car park are attacked by robots.

== Cast ==
- Alex Dimitriades as Conrad
- Tasma Walton as Stone
- Alison Whyte as JD
- Chris Haywood as Cleary
- John Clayton as Bruce
- Anne Tenney as Elaine
- Shane Briant as Cunningham
- Alyssa-Jane Cook as Mary
- Morgan O'Neill as Chauffeur
- Barry Quin

== Production ==
Esben Storm says he was inspired by the "automatic" weapons of war in Operation Desert Storm.

It's about God in a way. It's based on the lines from King Lear: `As flies to wanton boys are we to the gods. They kill us for their sport'. One of the themes is: if there is a God, what if that God is a prick; what if that God is just a bastard? For one of the characters, when he thinks that, it all makes sense, it makes sense of the world, that the world is such a slimy world of greed and selfishness and anguish and pain that the only way that it can make any sense is if the person who created the whole thing is... it's all a macabre joke. It's almost the opposite of Genesis 1: `We were made in God's image and likeness'. If you say, `We are sinful, horrible, we're in God's likeness, therefore that's what God is like'.
