= Hard Knuckle =

- Written by: Gary Day
- Directed by: Lex Marinos
- Starring: Steve Bisley; Gary Day; Esben Storm
- Country of origin: Australia
- Original language: English

Production
- Running time: 90 mins
- Production company: Somerset Film Productions

Original release
- Network: Nine Network
- Release: 1988

Hard Knuckle is a 1988 Australian post-apocalyptic action television film (later released on home video) about a young boy who tries to get a pool player back on track. It was part of the Tomorrow's News series.

It is one of the few films to feature in any detail the Australian pocket billiards game devil's pool (which features a series of upright pins, similar to large dominoes, as targets and obstacles).

== Cast ==
- Steve Bisley as Harry
- Gary Day as Topdog
- Graham Matters as Kevin
- Richard Moir as Alister
- Bob Baines as Corbett
- Esben Storm as Vince
