= Mercia Deane-Johns =

Australian actress

- Born: 21 February 1958 (age 68); Melbourne, Victoria, Australia
- Education: Gertrud Bodenwieser Dance Centre; London College of Music (1975); Southern Cross University (2010)
- Occupation: Actress
- Years active: 1973 – present
- Known for: Pro-choice stance, voice for Indigenous rights, civil rights, gay marriage, environmental issues, supports Julian Assange
- Notable work: Bluey; The Sullivans; Chances; Guinevere Jones; Packed to the Rafters
- Children: One daughter Natasha
- Awards: Best Actress at the Melbourne Underground Film Festival 2017 for the film Throbbin' 84

Mercia Deane-Johns is an Australian actress of film, stage and television. She is also a writer, singer, and stand-up comedian. She has played a wide array of characters since she was 12 years old and has appeared in many film roles and TV series on Australian screens.

== Education ==
Born in Melbourne on 21 February 1958, Mercia Deane-Johns trained at a television and film course with Crawford Productions, in 1974. She has studied ballet at the Gertrud Bodenwieser Dance Centre, in Sydney. Deane-Johns obtained a diploma in classical singing and theory of music from the London College of Music, Ealing, London in 1975. She is also an Associate of the London College of Music (A.L.C.M).

She was on a twelve-month contract at the Melbourne Theatre Company in 1978.

She has studied Tai chi and had private lessons with the late Tennyson Yui for one year, in 1980.

Deane-Johns attended Southern Cross University from 2006 to 2010 and obtained a Bachelor of Arts in writing and communication.

She plays classical piano at sixth grade level.

== Career ==
=== Film and television ===
Deane-Johns was in the Australian TV series Homicide in 1975 and 1976. She performed in the TV series Bluey as Debbie Morley in 1976. In 1977, she was in Cop Shop, a long running police drama series.

In the early 1980s, Deane-Johns appeared in several Australian New Wave films, including Heatwave (1981) directed by Phillip Noyce and based on the Juanita Nielsen disappearance case of the 1970s. The others were Winter of Our Dreams (1981), an award-winning drama written and directed by John Duigan and Going Down (1982). In 1982, she was also in Winner Take All – Downside Risk, a TV series about the fast-paced world of big business. In 1985, she was in Winners – The Other Facts of Life.

In 1991, Deane-Johns appeared in What's Cooking? an Australian cooking television series. That same year, she played the part of Sharon Taylor on the risqué series Chances. The series was discontinued in 1992, after a run of 127 hour-long episodes.

Deane-Johns was in the television film McLeod's Daughters in 1996 with Jack Thompson, Tammy MacIntosh and Kris McQuade. She was in the long-running Home and Away from 1997 to 2001, playing Melanie Rainbow. In 2002, she was in the Canadian-Australian co-production of Guinevere Jones, a teenage fantasy series where she played the part of evil witch Morgana. In 2007, she appeared in Unfinished Sky a story about a farmer who takes in an Afghan woman who has fled from a brothel.

In 2014 she had a supporting role in the film Last Cab to Darwin. In 2017 she played the part of Bulldozer in Throbbin' 84, a film taking its name from the 1984 Australian compilation music album Throbbin' '84.

Deane-Johns appeared in two seasons of The Other Guy in 2018 and 2019. She performed in season two of the comedy drama series Mr Inbetween in 2019. She was also in Location Scout a documentary series about the making of the Australian comedy film Top End Wedding, which was filmed around Darwin in 2018.

She has worked with some of Australia's best-known actors including John Hargreaves, Judy Davis, Nicole Kidman, Charles Bud Tingwell, John Meillon and Alwyn Kurts.

=== Voiceovers ===
In addition to acting, Deane-Johns has performed voiceover work, including four episodes of Persons of Interest in 2014.

=== Writing ===
Deane-Johns is also a writer and has kept an anecdotal record of her thespian experiences in an online blog called "Mercia's Missives". She describes the difficulties in working with misogynistic directors, unsympathetic make-up artists, bitchy co-stars and young actors who think they are God's gift to women.

Deane-Johns also wrote for the (now defunct) Australian Playboy magazine from 1988 to 1990. As she relates in her cogitations "Mercia's Missives": "I spent a lot of time in my room, writing a column for Playboy magazine, simply entitled "Women". Peter Olszewski, also known as JJ Mc Roach, the founder of the Marijuana Party was the editor at the time. I enjoyed writing for Playboy. I had a lot of material around me at the time for inspiration. Things were fine". She also wrote for Fame magazine from 1986 to 1987, and Simply Living.

=== Comedy ===
As well as singing and acting Deane-Johns has performed stand-up comedy and has ambitions to appear at the Edinburgh Festival Fringe one day. In 2011, she appeared with fellow Australian singer and actress Anne-Maree McDonald in Cabaret Caliente performing a one-hour stand-up comedy routine at The El Rocco Room, in Sydney's Kings Cross.

=== Posing for Australian Playboy ===
When pregnant with her daughter Natasha, Deane-Johns was the first pregnant woman in the world to be photographed for Playboy.

=== Music ===
Having a diploma in music, Deane-Johns worked extensively with the late Damien Lovelock. She toured with the Celibate Rifles in 1990 on their world tour and performed in Lovelock's band Wigworld singing Patti Smith songs amongst others. In 1990 she performed in Damien Lovelock's promo-video for the single "Disco Inferno" (April, 1990), taken from the 1988 album "It's A Wig Wig World".

She has sung in many jazz trios and duos and also cover bands for Woodstock, Led Zeppelin, Joni Mitchell and Fleetwood Mac.

== Filmography ==
=== Films ===
Year	Title	Role	Type
1973	Alvin Purple (aka The Sex Therapist)	Small role (uncredited)	Feature film
1975	The Box	Typist	Feature film
1980	Breaking Point	Performer	Short Film documentary
1981	Winter of Our Dreams	Angela	Feature film
1982	The Applicant	Role unknown	Short film
1982	Heatwave	Secretary	Feature film
1982	Going Down	Ned	Feature film
1983	Molly	Talent Agent	Feature film
1987	Pandemonium	Morticia	Feature film
1999	Erskineville Kings	Barmaid	Feature film
2007	Unfinished Sky	Barbara	Feature film
2012	The One Who Broke Your Heart	Sean's Mum	Short film
2014	Last Cab to Darwin	Fay	Feature film
2015	The Immortality of the Bounty Hunters	The Book Critic	Short film
2017	Throbbin' 84	Bulldozer	Film (Won award at Melbourne Underground Film Festival)
2018	Edge of the Earth	Mother	Short film

=== Television ===
Title	Year	Role	Type
1974; 1975	Division 4	Girl 2 / Maureen / Rita	TV series, 3 episodes
1975	Matlock Police	Gail	TV series, episode 177: "The Hill"
1975; 1976	Homicide	Maureen Wilson	TV series, 2 episodes
1976	Alvin Purple	Daisy	TV series, episode 5: "The Postman"
1976–1977	Bluey	Debbie Morley / Sharon Holt	TV series, 6 episodes
1976	Homicide	Brenda Lukins	TV series, 1 episode
1977	The Sullivans	Timna	TV series, 20 episodes
1977	Young Ramsay	Eleanor	TV series, episode 1: "Story of a Shaggy Dog"
1977–1979	Cop Shop	Andrea Williams / Jan / Gina Valente	TV series, 5 episodes
1978	Demolition	(uncredited)	TV movie
1979	Skyways	Susan Masters	TV series, episode 6: "Coming of Age"
1979	Twenty Good Years	Ruth Cohen	TV series, 5 episodes
1980	The Restless Years	Pat	TV series, 1 episode
1982	Winner Take All		TV series, 10 episodes
1984	Conferenceville		TV movie
1984	Crime of the Decade		TV movie
1984	Special Squad	Molly	TV series, episode 35: "Suzie's War"
1985	Double Sculls	Melanie Atkins	TV movie
1985	Winners - The Other Facts of Life	Policewoman	TV movie series, 1 episode
1985	Winners - Room to Move	Janet	TV movie series, 1 episode
1986	Body Business	Judy	TV miniseries, 2 episodes
1987	Vietnam	Linda Aarons	TV miniseries, 2 episodes
1990	Harbour Beat	Secretary	TV movie pilot
1991–1992	Chances	Sharon Taylor	TV series, 127 episodes
1995; 1999; 2003	Blue Heelers	Marcia Hyland / Raelene Stevens / Jan Bayliss	TV series, 3 episodes
1996	McLeod's Daughters	Rosa Wilcox	TV movie pilot
1996	Twisted Tales	Woman	TV movie series, 1 episode
1997; 2001	Home and Away	Melanie Rainbow / Kerry	TV series, 2 episodes
1998	Water Rats	Cheryl Voss	TV series, 1 episode
1999	Airtight	Ma Lucci	TV movie
2000	Above The Law	Joan Bartlett	TV series, 3 episodes
2000	All Saints	Mary Constantine	TV series, 1 episode
2002	The Secret Life of Us	Clairvoyant	TV series, 1 episode
2002	Guinevere Jones	Morgana Le Fay	TV series, 1 episode
2003	The Saddle Club	New Owner	TV series, 1 episode
2003	White Collar Blue	Connie Ciric	TV series, 1 episode
2009–2011	Packed to the Rafters	Grace Barton	TV series, 10 episodes
2012	Tricky Business	Vera Stanic	TV series, 1 episode
2014	Persons of Interest	Narrator	TV series, 4 episodes
2016	The Secret Daughter	Poppy	TV series, 1 episode
2017; 2019	The Other Guy	Bev / Cashier	TV series, 2 episodes
2018	Harrow	Sofia Calanna	TV series, 1 episode
2018	Location Scout	Herself	TV series
2019	Mr Inbetween	Steph	TV series, 1 episode
2021	Back to the Rafters	Mrs. Spade	TV series, 1 episode
2023	While The Men Are Away	Mrs. Whitmore	TV series, 4 episodes

== Theatre ==
Year	Production	Role	Company/Venue
1975	Two and Two Make Sex	Juvenile lead	Australian tour with J. C. Williamson's
1976	Spats – Back in Business		The Speakeasy
1976	The Happy Apples		The Actors' Company Theatre, Sydney
1978	Once a Catholic	Mary Murphy (School girl)	Russell Street Theatre, Melbourne with The Actors' Company Theatre
1978	Electra	Handmaiden	Melbourne Athenaeum with MTC
1978	The Playboy of the Western World	Nelly (Irish maid)	Melbourne Athenaeum with MTC
1979	George and Mildred	Understudy	Australian tour with the Elizabethan Theatre Company
1984	Wasting Away		Wawina Creative Secondary School, Sydney with Toe Truck Theatre
1984	The Blind Giant is Dancing	Rose Draper	Playhouse, Canberra with ACT Theatre Company
1984	A Pantomime	Fairy	The Actors' Company Theatre
1986	Bloody Poetry	Mary Shelley	Stables Theatre, Sydney with Precious Theatre Company
1989–1990	The Celibate Rifles	Singer	World tour (also tour manager)
1995	Meanwhile Back on Planet Earth	Liza Minnelli	Bondi Pavilion with Precious Theatre Company
2010	Fleetwood Mac Cover Band	Stevie Nicks	Caravansera
2011	Cabaret Caliente	Singer / Stand Up	MDJ Productions (also writer)
2011	Now Festival – Woodstock Music	Janis Joplin / Grace Slick	Caravansera (also producer / director)
2011	Transport	Irish Mystic	
2013	Don Quixote	Housekeeper	
2015	Monk's Wife	Monk's Wife	MDJ Productions
	Troppo Flamingo		Musical Theatre Restaurant, Blue Mountains with Precious Theatre Company

== Award ==
She won an award at the 18th Melbourne Underground Film Festival in 2017 for Throbbin' 84.
