= Vera Plevnik =

Australian actress

Vera Plevnik (c. 1955/1956 – 27 January 1982) was an Australian actress, born to Yugoslav-Russian parents best known for winning a Logie for her performance as a resistance fighter Nadia Grosse in the TV movie The John Sullivan Story, a spin-off of the TV series The Sullivans

She initially trained at teachers college, but chose acting, training at the Victorian College of the Arts.

Plevnik died in a car crash on the Princes Highway near Batemans Bay when her late-model sedan was involved in a head-on collision. The 60-year-old driver of the other vehicle also was killed .

She had previously been a partner of musician James Reyne and her life inspired several of his songs.

== Select credits ==
- The Golden Oldies (1977) – play
- The John Sullivan Story (1979) – TV movie
- The Sullivans (1980) – TV series
- Cop Shop (1980) – TV series
- Young Ramsay (1980) – TV series – episode "The Littlest Goldmine"
- The Same Stream (1981) – short
- The Fame is Shared (1981) – live performance
- Conundra (1982) – play
- Monkey Grip (1982) – Feature film
- Going Down (1982) – Feature film
