= With Prejudice =

- Directed by: Esben Storm
- Written by: Leon Saunders
- Produced by: Don Catchlove
- Starring: Terry Serio; Chris Haywood
- Distributed by: AFI
- Release date: 1983
- Country: Australia
- Language: English
- Budget: A$250,000

With Prejudice is a 1983 Australian film directed by Esben Storm and starring Terry Serio and Chris Haywood. The screenplay concerns the three men arrested for the Sydney Hilton bombing.

== Production ==
The film was shot over 18 days. Ebsen Storm says he argued with the producer over the film but he still liked the end result a lot, calling it "one of those tax scam movies that ended up not being too bad".

== Cast ==
- Terry Serio as Paul Alister
- Chris Haywood as Rogerson
- Tony Barry as Adams
- Max Cullen as Krawczyk
- Peter Whitford as Bodor
- Scott Burgess as Ross Dunn
- Richard Moir as Middleton
- John Clayton as Burke (uncredited)
