= 27A =

1974 film

- Directed by: Esben Storm
- Written by: Esben Storm
- Produced by: Haydn Keenan
- Starring: Robert McDarra
- Cinematography: Michael Edols
- Edited by: Richard Moir
- Music by: Winsome Evans
- Production company: Street Smart Films
- Distributed by: Sharmill Films
- Release date: 5 June 1974
- Running time: 86 min.
- Country: Australia
- Language: English
- Budget: A$36,000

27A is a 1974 Australian drama film directed by Esben Storm. At the AFI Awards it won in the Best Actor (Robert McDarra) and Best Fiction (Haydn Keenan) categories.

== Plot ==
Bill McDonald is a middle aged alcoholic who is sentenced to six weeks in prison for a minor offence. He volunteers for psychiatric treatment and is committed to a hospital for the criminally insane supposedly only for the duration of his prison sentence. However under section 27A of Queensland's Mental Health Act he can be held there until hospital authorities declare him eligible for release.

Bill clashes with a nurse, Cornish, and is detained in the hospital because of his attitude. He attempts three times to escape. Eventually he is released after a journalist publicises his case.

== Cast ==
- Robert McDarra as Bill
- Bill Hunter as Cornish
- Graham Corry as Peter Newman
- Richard Moir as Richard
- James Kemp as Slats
- Kris Olsen as Gloria
- Brian Doyle as Lynch
- Richard Creaser as Jeremy
- Michael Norton as Mark
- Haydn Keenan as Jeffrey
- Gary McFeeter as Samuel
- Tom Farley as Vic
- Jim Doherty as suicide
- Peter Gailey as co-escapee
- Karl Florsheim as German patient
- Race Gailey as office boy
- Bob Maza as Darkie's mate
- Zac Martin as Ernie
- Kevin Healey as old acquaintance
- Betty Dyson as alcoholic
- Beth Brookes as singer
- Brett Maxwell as young boy in warehouse
- Pauline Fozall as pianist
- Robert Ewing as public servant
- Max Osbiston as Frederick Parsons

== Production ==
Esben Storm and producer Haydn Keenan had made a number of successful short films and wanted to move into features. The script was developed by Storm in association with interviews he conducted in 1972 with Robert Somerville, a man who had been forcibly detained in a Queensland hospital in the late 1960s. By the time the film was made, however, section 27A had been repealed. Cecil Holmes worked as script editor. Storm:

The main influence on the style of the film was that we knew we wouldn't be able to raise a lot of money... If we wanted to make a feature film, we'd have to make it cheap. There was a style at that time, sort of pseudo-documentary, with a lot of hand-held camera work - Cullodden, Cathy Come Home and Poor Cow, that English, Ken Loach, Peter Watkins realism. I was drawn to the subject in the newspapers and then went off to investigate and research it. I felt that it would suit that style... A basic theme... is that of someone trying to break out, someone feeling trapped within themselves, trapped within the system. That probably drew me to it. Then when I went to research it, I found a broader tapestry.

Robert McDarra, who played the lead, was himself an alcoholic. Bill Hunter was cast in his first feature film role. $23,000 of the budget was raised from a syndicate of 18 businessmen, with $13,000 coming from a grant from the Australian Film Television Radio School.

The film was shot on 16mm starting 28 February 1973 at Christian Brothers psychiatric hospital near Sydney.

== Release ==
The film premiered at the Sydney Film Festival and achieved a limited release. It never recovered its costs, however it screened at a number of festivals and was critically acclaimed.

The film won the AFI Award for Best Film. Robert McDarra won the AFI Award for his performance.
