= The Office Picnic =

- Directed by: Tom Cowan
- Written by: Tom Cowan
- Produced by: Tom Cowan
- Starring: John Wood; Kate Fitzpatrick
- Cinematography: Michael Edols
- Edited by: Kit Guyatt
- Production company: Child's Play Moving Picture Company
- Distributed by: Tom Cowan
- Release date: 17 November 1972
- Running time: 83 minutes
- Country: Australia
- Language: English
- Budget: A$30,000

The Office Picnic is a 1972 Australian comedy film directed by Tom Cowan. It was entered into the 8th Moscow International Film Festival.

== Plot summary ==
A group of public servants go on an annual picnic. Two of them, Peter and Elly, disappear.

== Cast ==
- John Wood as Clyde
- Kate Fitzpatrick as Mara
- Philip Deamer as Peter
- Gaye Steele as Elly
- Ben Gabriel as Mr Johnson
- Max Cullen as Jim O'Casey
- Anne Tait
- Francis Flannigan
- Bryon Kennedy
- Graham Richards
- Elaine Smith

== Production ==
Cowan got the idea to make the film while walking through the bush during shooting of a documentary in the Victorian countryside. He says he was also influenced by the novels of Patrick White and the films of Antonioni.

The film was shot on 35mm using a budget in part funded by the Experimental Film and Television Fund. It started in January 1972 but the money ran out during filming and there was a hiatus until filming resumed in April. The shoot took fifteen days in all.

== Release ==
The film was successfully previewed at Toorak and for a time it looked as though it would be distributed by British Empire Films but in the end most commercial screenings were arranged by the director.
