= Sweet Dreamers =

- Directed by: Tom Cowan
- Written by: Tom Cowan; Lesley Tucker
- Produced by: Lesley Tucker
- Starring: Richard Moir; Sue Smithers
- Release date: 1981
- Country: Australia
- Language: English

Sweet Dreamers is a 1981 Australian film directed by Tom Cowan and starring Richard Moir and Sue Smithers. The film is about a filmmaker and his girlfriend.

Cowan has said the film was very autobiographical and met with a great deal of resistance from funding bodies. It was the last dramatic feature film directed by Cowan for a long time.

The film was partly funded by the Creative Development Branch of the Australian Film Commission.

== Cast ==
- Richard Moir as Will Daniels
- Sue Smithers as Josephine Russell
- Adam Bowen as Stuart
- Frankie Raymond as Landlady
- Richard Tipping as Busker
- Karen Turner as Actress
- Paul Blackwell as Train Lout
- Tony Johnson as Train Lout
- Gabriel as Waitress
- Gypsy Rose as Little girl
