= Scott Burgess (actor) =

Australian actor

- Born: 14 July 1958; Australia
- Died: 6 May 2016 (aged 57); Australia
- Occupation: Actor
- Years active: 1982–2009
- Spouse: Tracy Jones
- Children: 4, including Zach

Scott Burgess (14 July 1958 – 6 May 2016) was an Australian actor, best known for his role as Dave McCall in police drama Water Rats from 1996 to 1999.

== Career ==
Burgess' first role was in the film Dead Easy, before getting his lucky break in the World War I miniseries 1915.

He went on to feature in The Great Bookie Robbery, The Dirtwater Dynasty and Inside Running, before scoring his long-running role as Senior Sergeant Dave McCall, in four seasons of Water Rats. He quit the series of his own accord, desiring a change, and subsequently scored the lead role of Bill Peterson in Above the Law.

Burgess later returned to television in four episodes of Underbelly: A Tale of Two Cities in 2009.

== Personal life ==
In 2008, he revealed to A Current Affair that a marital rift cut his acting career short, and lead to him working in minimum wage job in a boat yard.

Burgess' marriage to Tracy Jones produced four children, including Nadia, Ella, Lily and Zac. His son Zac Burgess is also an actor, and played Eli Bell in the Australian miniseries, Boy Swallows Universe.

== Death ==
Burgess died in 2016, aged 57, following a heart attack.

== Filmography ==
=== Film ===
Year	Title	Role	Type
1982	Dead Easy	George	Feature film
1983	With Prejudice	Ross Dunn	Feature film
1983	Outbreak of Hostilities	Bobby Benton	TV movie
1986	Just Us	Billy Carter	TV movie
1988	Computer Ghosts	'Ras' Cal	TV movie
1998	Cody: The Wrong Stuff	Mike	TV movie

=== Television ===
Year	Title	Role	Type
1982	1915	Billy McKenzie	TV miniseries, 7 episodes
1983–84	Kings	John King	TV series, 17 episodes
1984	Special Squad	Michael	TV series
1986	The Great Bookie Robbery	Les 'Robbo' Robbins	TV miniseries, 2 episodes
1988	The Dirtwater Dynasty	Guy Westaway	TV miniseries, 5 episodes
1988	Australians	Clyde Fenton	Anthology TV series, episode 7: "Clyde Fenton"
1989	Inside Running	Christopher Parvo	TV series, 19 episodes
1992	G.P.	David Robinson	TV series, season 4, episode 1: "Test of Conscience"
1992	Tracks of Glory	Pat Galloway	TV miniseries, 2 episodes
1992	E Street	Jimmy Duval	TV series, 9 episodes
1996	Heartbreak High	Damien	TV series, season 4, episode 9
1996–2000	Water Rats	Senior Sergeant Dave McCall	TV series, 116 episodes
2000	Above the Law	Bill Peterson	TV series, 35 episodes
2009	Underbelly: A Tale of Two Cities	James Fredrick 'Fred' Bazley	TV miniseries, 6 episodes
