= Dead Easy (1982 film) =

- DVD cover
- Directed by: Bert Deling
- Written by: Bert Deling
- Produced by: John Weiley
- Starring: Scott Burgess; Rosemary Paul
- Cinematography: Tom Cowan; Mike Molloy
- Edited by: John Scott
- Music by: William Motzing
- Production company: Firebird Films
- Release date: 1982
- Running time: 92 minutes
- Country: Australia
- Language: English

Dead Easy is a 1982 Australian action film directed by Bert Deling and starring Scott Burgess and Rosemary Paul.

== Plot ==
In Kings Cross, Sydney, three friends end up being hunted by every thug and killer when they incur the wrath of a mob boss after they break into the entertainment business.

== Cast ==
- Scott Burgess as George
- Rosemary Paul as Alex
- Tim McKenzie as Armstrong
- Max Phipps as Francis
- Tony Barry as Ozzie
- Jack O'Leary as Morry
- Joe Martin as Sol
- Barney Combes as Jack
- Sandy Gore as Frieda
