= Haydn Keenan =

Australian producer, writer and director

Haydn Keenan (c. 1951) is an Australian producer, writer and director.

== Select credits ==
- 27A (1974) - producer
- Going Down (1983) - producer, director
- Pandemonium (1987) - director
- Persons of Interest: The Asio Files (2012) (documentary)
