= Going Down (film) =

- VHS cover
- Directed by: Haydn Keenan
- Written by: Moira MacLaine-Cross, Julie Barry, Melissa Woods (also credited as "Additional Directed Material")
- Starring: Tracy Mann; Vera Plevnik; Julie Barry; Moira MacLaine-Cross
- Release date: 1983
- Running time: 92 min
- Country: Australia
- Language: English
- Budget: A$400,000

Going Down is a 1982 Australian film about young people living in a share house.

The film's one-liner reads: "Four women friends leave behind the feral days of youth after a night of uncontrolled excess in inner-city Sydney during the early 1980s."

== Cast ==
- Tracy Mann as Karli
- Vera Plevnik as Jane
- Julie Barry as Jackie
- Moira MacLaine-Cross as Ellen
- David Argue as Greg / Trixie
- Esben Storm as Michael
- Ian Gilmour as Shadow
- Danny Adcock as Supporter
- Mercia Deane-Johns as Ned

== Release ==
The film was self-distributed and ran for 14 weeks in Sydney but performed poorly in Melbourne. In 2025, Muscle Distribution, as part of its first acquisition and theatrical release, restored the film in 4K for its first-ever U.S. run, premiering at BAM Rose Cinemas in New York.

The film was officially rereleased in May 2026 in Australia by Smart St Films

== Reception ==
"A remarkable landmark in Australian independent filmmaking. Unfortunately, it is a landmark that few people noticed.” - Marcus Breen, Australian Film 1978 - 1992 (1993).

"One of the first films to show the world the true gritty underside of Australian life, Going Down has become a cult classic for its realistic depiction of Sydney in the 1980s, a portrayal decidedly at odds with the sun, surf, sand and barbies of Australia's tourism campaigns." - Melbourne International Film Festival 2009

In the Sydney Morning Herald in 2011 Mark Swayer wrote "no film I've seen has better captured the chaotic heartbeat of the young sensation-seeker's Sydney."
