= Tom Cowan (director) =

Australian filmmaker

- Born: 31 October 1942 (age 83); Victoria, Australia
- Occupation: Film director
- Years active: 1964-present

Tom Cowan (born 31 October 1942) is an Australian filmmaker.

== Career ==
He started as a trainee at the Australian Broadcasting Commission and the joined the Commonwealth Film Unit. He left it in 1968 to work as a freelance cameraman and moved into feature films. His 1972 film The Office Picnic was entered into the 8th Moscow International Film Festival.

== Select filmography ==
- The Dancing Girls (1964) - documentary - DOP
- Helena in Sydney (1967) - documentary - short
- This Year Jerusalem (1969) - documentary - DOP, director
- Samskara (1969) - DOP
- Trouble in Molopolis (1970) - DOP
- Mogador (1970) - DOP (film appears to never have screened publicly)
- Australia Felix (1970) - short - director
- Story of a House (1970) - educational short
- Down Under (1971) - DOP
- Bonjour Balwyn (1971) - DOP
- The Office Picnic (1972) - director, writer, producer
- Promised Woman (1975) - director, writer, DOP
- Wild Wind (1975) - director
- Pure S (1975) - DOP
- The Love Letters from Teralba Road (1977) - DOP
- Journey Among Women (1977) - director
- Third Person Plural (1978) - DOP
- Mouth to Mouth (1978)
- Dimboola (1979) - DOP
- Sweet Dreamers (1981) - director
- Winter of Our Dreams (1981) - DOP
- Dead Easy (1982) - DOP
- One Night Stand (1984) - DOP
- Emma's War (1986) - DOP
- Antarctica (1991) (documentary) - DOP
- Backsliding (1992) - DOP
- Africa's Elephant Kingdom (1998) (documentary) - DOP
- Orange Love Story (2004) - director

=== Unmade films ===
- Roche (1974) - proposed follow up to Promised Woman
