= Bill Hunter (actor) =

Australian actor (1940–2011)

- Born: William John Hunter; 27 February 1940; Ballarat, Victoria, Australia
- Died: 21 May 2011 (aged 71); Kew, Victoria, Australia
- Occupations: Actor; comedian; voice-over artist
- Years active: 1957–2011
- Spouses: Robbie Anderson (m. 1963; div. 1973); Pat Bishop (m. 1976, divorced); Rhoda Roberts (m. 1993; sep. 1999)

William John Hunter (27 February 1940 – 21 May 2011) was an Australian actor of film, stage and television, who was also prominent as a voice-over artist. He appeared in more than 60 films and won two AFI Awards. He was also a recipient of the Centenary Medal.

== Early life ==
William John Hunter was born on 27 February 1940 in Ballarat, Victoria, the son of William and Francie Hunter. He had a brother, John, and a sister, Marie Ann.

During his teens, Hunter was a champion swimmer, and briefly held a world record for the 100 yards freestyle until his record was broken by John Devitt in the very next heat 10 minutes later. Hunter qualified for the Australian swimming team for the 1956 Summer Olympics in Melbourne, Australia, before a bout of meningitis ended his Olympic hopes.

== Career ==
Hunter made his film debut as an extra in 1957 film The Shiralee. An introduction to Ava Gardner saw him gain a job as an extra and swimming double in the Hollywood film On the Beach, which was filming in Melbourne. Hunter claimed that he was inspired to take up acting after watching one of the leads (variously claimed to be either Gregory Peck or Fred Astaire) do 27 takes of a scene, and thinking he could do better. He took an intensive drama course in Melbourne and sailed aboard the RHMS Ellinis on New Year's Eve 1964 for England. There he won a two-year scholarship to the prestigious Northampton Repertory Company in England. In 1966, Hunter made his first television appearance, two episodes in The Ark, a serial within the third season of the BBC television drama series Doctor Who.

Hunter returned to Australia in 1967 and began working in television drama and feature films. He had interviewed with Gavrik Losey in London, making no great impression in that highly competitive atmosphere, but Losey was able to offer Hunter his first Australian film appearance in Ned Kelly in 1970 with Losey as production supervisor. Hunter often played characters who were the strong, opinionated, archetypal gruff Australian whose exterior belies a softer heart and sensibilities vulnerable to pressure.

Some of his most notable movie roles include Mad Dog Morgan (1976), Newsfront (1978), Gallipoli (1981), The Dismissal, Scales of Justice (1983), Strictly Ballroom (1992), Muriel's Wedding (1994), The Adventures of Priscilla, Queen of the Desert (1994) and Australia (2008). In 2007, he reprised the role of Bob in the Australian touring stage production of Priscilla. He also provided the voice of the dentist Philip Sherman in Finding Nemo (2003) and the voice of Bubo in Legend of the Guardians: The Owls of Ga'Hoole (2010). He portrayed United Nations Secretary General Spencer Chartwell in the American science fiction series Space: Above and Beyond. His last film role was in The Cup (2011).

Of acting, Hunter said, "As long as the director told me where to stand and what to say, I was happy. Anyone who says there's any more to it than that, is full of bullshit. ... It's a job. It is a craft, but there's no art involved. What you need is common sense and a reasonably rough head. You put on the makeup and the wardrobe, and that is half the performance. That upsets the purists, but never mind, they don't work as much as I do."

== Awards and honours ==
Hunter won the 1978 AFI Award for Best Actor in a Leading Role for Newsfront, and the 1981 Best Supporting Actor award for Gallipoli.

In 2001, he was awarded the Centenary Medal "for service to acting, including the films Gallipoli and Frontline.

A painting of Hunter by artist Jason Benjamin won the Packing Room Prize in conjunction with the 2005 Archibald Prize.

== Personal life ==
Hunter was a supporter of the Australian Labor Party, appearing in the party's official 1996 Federal Election Campaign advertisement.

Hunter's first marriage was to Robbie Anderson from 1963 to 1973, with whom he had a son, named James Hunter. His next marriage was to actress Pat Bishop, in 1976. According to writer Bob Ellis, the marriage was short-lived after Hunter ran off with their marriage celebrant.

His third marriage was to artist and television presenter Rhoda Roberts, in 1993. They lived together until 1999, when he suddenly announced that he wanted to leave the marriage. She did not know why until he visited her shortly before his death in 2011 and told her that he did not want her to have to nurse him. They did not, however, get divorced. She also said that, despite the common perception that he contracted liver cancer because he drank too much, he was in Alcoholics Anonymous when they met and was not a drunk.

== Death ==
On 15 May 2011, Hunter was admitted to Caritas Christi hospice in Kew, after refusing to go to a hospital. Surrounded by family and friends, he died of liver cancer on 21 May 2011, aged 71.

A memorial service for Hunter was held at Melbourne's Princess Theatre on 26 May 2011. Close friend and co-star Mick Molloy paid tribute to Bill Hunter on stage at the 54th Logie Awards in April 2012.

== Filmography ==
=== Film ===
Year	Title	Role	Notes
1970	Ned Kelly	Officer (uncredited)	Feature film
1974	27A	Cornish	Feature film
1974	Stone	Barman	Feature film
1975	The Man from Hong Kong (a.k.a. The Dragon Flies)	Peterson	Feature film
1976	Eliza Fraser	Youlden	Feature film
1976	Mad Dog Morgan	Sgt. Smith	Feature film
1977	Backroads	Jack	Feature film
1978	In Search of Anna	Peter	Feature film
1978	Newsfront	Len Maguire	Feature film AFI Award for Best Actor in a Leading Role
1978	Weekend of Shadows	Bosun	Feature film
1980	Dead Man's Float (a.k.a. Smuggler’s Cove)	Eddie Bell	Feature film
1980	Hard Knocks	Brady	Feature film
1981	Gallipoli	Major Barton	Feature film AFI Award for Best Actor in a Supporting Role
1981	... Maybe This Time	Stephen	Feature film
1982	Heatwave	Robert Duncan	Feature film
1982	Far East	Walker	Feature film
1983	The Hit	Harry	Feature film
1983	The Return of Captain Invincible	Tupper / Coach	Feature film
1984	Street Hero	Detective Fitzpatrick	Feature film
1985	An Indecent Obsession	Colonel Chinstrap	Feature film
1985	Rebel	Browning	Feature film
1986	Death of a Soldier	Detective Sgt. Adams	Feature film
1986	Sky Pirates	O'Reilly	Feature film
1987	The Shiralee	Extra	TV film
1988	Rikky and Pete	Whitstead	Feature film
1989	Fever	Sgt. Jack Welles	Feature film
1989	Mull	Frank Mullens	Feature film
1989	Police State		TV film
1990	Call Me Mr. Brown	Detective Sergeant ‘Jim’ Jack McNeill	Feature film
1991	Deadly	Vernon Giles	Feature film
1992	The Last Days of Chez Nous	Beth's Father	Feature film
1992	Strictly Ballroom	Barry Fife	Feature film
1993	Broken Highway	Wilson	Feature film
1993	The Custodian	Managing director	Feature film
1993	Shotgun Wedding	Police Commissioner Andrews	Feature film
1994	The Adventures of Priscilla, Queen of the Desert	Bob	Feature film
1994	Everynight ... Everynight	Berriman	Feature film
1994	Muriel's Wedding	Bill Heslop	Feature film
1996	Cody: Fall from Grace	Sam Wolfe	TV film
1996	Race the Sun	Commissioner Hawkes	Feature film
1996	River Street	Vincent Pierce	Feature film
1997	Road to Nhill	Bob	Feature film
1998	15 Amore	Brendan (voice)	Feature film
1998	The Echo of Thunder	Cooper (uncredited)	TV film
2000	On the Beach	Prime Minister Seaton	TV film
2002	Crackerjack	Stan Coombs	Feature film
2003	Finding Nemo	Dentist Philip Sherman (voice)	Animated feature film
2003	Bad Eggs	Ted Pratt	Feature film
2003	Horseplay	Barry Coxhead	
2003	Kangaroo Jack	Blue	Feature film
2004	Tom White	Malcolm	Feature film
2008	The Square	Gil Hubbard	Feature film
2008	Australia	Skipper (Qantas Sloop)	Feature film
2010	The Wedding Party	Priest	Feature film
2010	Legend of the Guardians: The Owls of Ga'Hoole	Bubo (voice)	Animated feature film
2011	Red Dog	Himself	Feature film (posthumous release)
2011	The Cup	Bart Cummings	Feature film Final film appearance (posthumous release)

=== Television ===
Year	Title	Role	Notes
1966	Doctor Who – The Ark	Guardian (uncredited)	TV series 2 episodes: "The Steel Sky", "The Plague'"
1977	Beyond Reasonable Doubt	Ronald Ryan	Documentary series
1984	The Keepers	Jack Wolfe	TV series
1989	Cassidy	Charles Parnell Cassidy	Miniseries
1992	The Leaving of Liverpool	Father O'Neill	Miniseries
1993	Stark	Ocker Tyron	Miniseries
1995	Blue Murder	Angus McDonald	Miniseries
1995–96	Space: Above And Beyond	United Nations Secretary General Spencer Chartwell	TV series
1998	A Difficult Woman	Paul Scanlon	Miniseries
2006	Two Twisted	Grandfather	TV series
2010	The Pacific	James	Miniseries

== Theatre ==
Hunter's theatre roles included:

Year	Title	Role	Notes
1961	The World of Suzie Wong		Palais Theatre
1973	Summer of the Seventeenth Doll		Nimrod Street Theatre
1974	Well Hung		Nimrod Upstairs
1975	Down Under		Stables Theatre
1976	The Season at Sarsaparilla	Rowley Masson	Sydney Opera House Drama Theatre
1979	Makassar Reef	Perry Glasson	Nimrod Upstairs
1979	Errol Flynn's Great Big Adventure Book for Boys	Errol Flynn	Russell Street Theatre
1991	Summer of the Seventeenth Doll	Roo	Seymour Centre
2000	The Caribbean Tempest		Royal Botanic Garden
2007–08	Priscilla, Queen of the Desert	Bob	Regent Theatre, Melbourne, Civic Theatre, Auckland, Lyric Theatre, Sydney
