= List of Australian films of 1989 =

== 1989 ==
| Title | Director | Cast | Genre | Notes |
|---|---|---|---|---|
| Action Replay | Sara Hourez | Shane Feeney-Connor, Rhondda Findleton, Anna Hruby, Stuart Robinson, Nell Schofield, George Spartels | Comedy Feature film | IMDb |
| Afraid to Dance | Denny Lawrence | Nique Needles, Rosey Jones, Grigor Taylor, Tina Bursill, Annie Byron, Tom Richards, Marina Finlay | Crime / Romance | IMDb |
| Against the Innocent | Daryl Dellora | Margaret Cameron, Nick Lathouris, Alex Menglet | Short film | IMDb |
| The Audition | Anna Campion | Edith Campion, Jane Campion | Short film | IMDb |
| Bangkok Hilton | Ken Cameron | Nicole Kidman, Denholm Elliott, Hugo Weaving, Joy Smithers, Norman Kaye, Jerome Ehlers | TV Mini Series | IMDb |
| Becca | Paul Turner | Beth Robert, Dafydd Hywel, Dafydd Emyr, Robin Griffith, Lynette Curran, Jeff Phillips, Gary Sweet, Sheila Florance, Chris Hallam, Jacinta Stapleton, Polly Croke | Drama ABC TV film | |
| Bloodmoon | Alex Mills | Leon Lissek, Christine Amor, Ian Williams, Helen Thomson, Raymond Turner, Hazel Howson, Craig Cronin, Suzie MacKenzie, Chris Uhlmann | Horror / Thriller Feature film | IMDb |
| Blowing Hot and Cold | Marc Gracie | Joe Dolce, Peter Adams, Kate Gorman, Bruce Kane, Mary Coustas, Denise Drysdale, Dennis Coard, John Raaen, Elspeth Ballantyne | Drama Feature film | IMDb |
| Bonza | David Swann | Peter Green, Maureen Edwards, Suzie Dee, Peter Rowsthorn | Short / Comedy film | IMDb |
| The Boys in the Island | Geoff Bennett | Yves Stening, Jane Stephens, James Fox, Steve Jacobs, Daniel Pollock, Ben Oxenbould | Adventure / Crime | IMDb |
| Candy Regentag | James Ricketson | Patsy Stephen, Warwick Moss, Gary Aron Cook | Drama Feature film | IMDb aka Kiss The Night |
| Cappuccino | Antony J. Bowman | John Clayton, Rowena Wallace, Jeanie Drynan, Barry Quin, Cristina Parker, Ritchie Singer, Simon Matthews, Ernie Dingo | Comedy Feature film | IMDb |
| Chances | Mike Smith | Diane Craig, Marcus Graham, Sandy Gore, Peter Phelps, John Sheerin, Mercia Deane-Johns, Anne Grigg, Mark Kounnas, Natalie McCurry, Leverne McDonnell, Warwick Moss, Christopher Stollery, Michael Caton, Kim Deacon, Caz Lederman, Patrick Ward, Patsy Stephen, Rob Steele, Margaret Umbers, Mouche Phillips | Drama TV film / TV Pilot | |
| Closer and Closer Apart | Steve Middleton | Steve Bastoni, George Harlem, Marie-Louise Walker, Kate Jason, Yvette Bentana, George Kapiniaris, Linda Hartley | Drama Feature film | |
| The Corsican Brothers | | | Animation | IMDb |
| Dangerfreaks | Brian Trenchard-Smith | Nick Tate, Grant Page, Max Aspin | Documentary | IMDb |
| Dead Calm | Phillip Noyce | Nicole Kidman, Sam Neill, Billy Zane, Rod Mullinar, Joshua Tilden, Michael Long, George Shevtsov | Drama / Thriller Feature film | IMDb |
| The Delinquents | Chris Thomson | Kylie Minogue, Charlie Schlatter, Bruno Lawrence, Todd Boyce, Angela Punch McGregor, Desiree Smith, Lynette Curran, Melissa Jaffer | Drama / Romance Feature film | IMDb |
| Devil in the Flesh | Scott Murray | Katia Caballero, Keith Smith, John Morris, Jill Forster, Odile Le Clezio, Colin Duckworth, Reine Lavoie, Peter Cummins | Drama Feature film | IMDb aka: "Beyond Innocence" |
| Echoes of Paradise | Phillip Noyce | Wendy Hughes, John Lone | Drama | IMDb |
| Elevation | Stephen Cummins | | Short | IMDb |
| Fever | Craig Lahiff | Bill Hunter, Gary Sweet, Mary Regan | Crime / Romance | IMDb |
| Glass | Chris Kennedy | Alan Lovell, Lisa Peers, Adam Stone, Julie Herbert, Bernard Clisby, Richard Gilbert, Marilyn Thomas, Rowan Jackson, Lucinda Walker-Powell, Felicity Copeland, Natalie McCurry | Thriller Feature film | IMDb |
| Houseboat Horror | Kendal Flanagan | Alan Dale, Christine Jeston, Craig Alexander, Des McKenna, Gavin Wood, Louise Siversen, Peppie D'Or, Steven Whittacker, Julie Thompson, Mark Muggeridge, John Michael Howson | Horror Feature film | IMDb |
| Island | Paul Cox | Irene Papas, Eva Sitta, Anoja Weerasinghe, Norman Kaye, Rousso Petrinolis, Francois Bernard, Michael Psaris, Rene Frangrodakis, Chris Haywood | Drama Feature film | IMDb |
| Its a Business Doing Pleasure | Sharon Connelly | | Documentary | IMDb |
| Joe Leahy's Neighbours | Robin Anderson, Bob Connolly | | Documentary | IMDb |
| Kokoda Crescent | Ted Robinson | Warren Mitchell, Ruth Cracknell, Bill Kerr, Madge Ryan, Martin Vaughan, Penne Hackforth-Jones, Steven Jacobs, Lisa Rhodes, John Orcsik, Slim de Grey, Patrick Thompson | Drama / War Feature film | IMDb |
| Luigi's Ladies | Judy Morris | Wendy Hughes, Sandy Gore, Anne Tenney, David Rappaport, John Walton, Serge Lazareff, Ray Meagher, Max Cullen, Joe Spano, Maggie Dence, Genevieve Lemon, Robert Mammone | Comedy Feature film | IMDb |
| Malpractice | Bill Bennett | Caz Lederman, Bob Baines, Ian Gilmour, Pat Thomson, Charles Little, Janet Stanley, Dorothy Alison | Docu-drama TV film | IMDb, Screened at the 1989 Cannes Film Festival |
| Minnamurra | Ian Barry | Jeff Fahey, Tushka Bergen | Drama | IMDb aka: "Wrangler", "Outback" or "The Fighting Creed" |
| Mortgage | Bill Bennett | Brian Vriends, Doris Younane, Bruce Venables, Andrew S. Gilbert, Paul Coolahan, Ken Radley, Elizabeth Maywald, Ben Oxenbould, Bob Ellis | Docu-drama TV film | |
| Mull | Don McLennan | Nadine Garner, Bill Hunter, Sue Jones, Craig Morrison, Bradley Kilpatrick, Kymara Stowers, June Roxas, Dominic Sweeney, Nick Giannopoulos, Mary Coustas | Drama Feature film | IMDb |
| Night Cries: A Rural Tragedy | Tracey Moffatt | Marcia Langton, Agnes Hardwick, Jimmy Little | Short | IMDb |
| Night Out | Lawrence Johnston | Colin Batrouney, David Bonney | Drama | IMDb, Screened at the 1990 Cannes Film Festival |
| Nullarbor Dreaming | | Nick Tate, Ernie Dingo, Ron Allum | Documentary | IMDb |
| Out of the Body | Brian Trenchard-Smith | Mark Hembrow, Tessa Humphries, Shane Briant, Linda Newton, Margi Gerard, Tim Campbell, John Clayton, Helen O'Connor, Mary Regan, Carrie Zivetz, John Ley | Horror / Thriller Feature film | IMDb |
| Phone Sex Girls: Australia | John T. Bone | Deidre Holland, Kelly Blue, Alice Springs | Adult | IMDb |
| The Prisoner of St. Petersburg | Ian Pringle | Noah Taylor, Solveig Dommartin, Rene Schonenberger, Dennis Staunton, Olivier Picot, Katja Teichmann | Drama Feature film | IMDb, Screened at the 1989 Cannes Film Festival |
| The Punisher | Mark Goldblatt | Dolph Lundgren, Louis Gossett Jr., Jeroen Krabbé, Kim Miyori, Bryan Marshall, Nancy Everhard, Barry Otto, Brian Rooney, Zoshka Mizak, Kenji Yamaki, Brooke 'Mikey' Anderson, Todd Boyce | Action / Crime / Thriller Feature film | IMDb |
| Return Home | Ray Argall | Frankie J Holden, Dennis Coard, Mickie Camilleri, Ben Mendelsohn, Rachel Rains, Gypsy Lockwood, Ryan Rawlings, Alan Fletcher | Drama Feature film | |
| Rescue | Peter Fisk | Gary Sweet, Sonia Todd, Kerry Armstrong, Tim McKenzie, Doug Scroope, John Clayton, Marshall Napier | Action / Drama ABC TV film | ABC TV film / ABC TV Pilot |
| Salute of the Jugger | David Webb Peoples | Rutger Hauer, Joan Chen, Vincent D'Onofrio, Max Fairchild | Action / Sci-Fi | IMDb aka: "The Blood of Heroes" |
| Sex Rules | Pip Karmel | Kirsty McGregor, Angelica Klages, Brendan Duhigg | Short | IMDb |
| The Siege of Firebase Gloria | Brian Trenchard-Smith | Wings Hauser, R. Lee Ermey, Robert Arevalo, Mark Neely, Albert Popwell, Gary Hershberger, Clyde R Jones, Margi Gerard, Richard Kuhlman, John Calvin | Action / War Feature film | IMDb |
| Sons of Steel | Gary L. Keady | Rob Hartley, Roz Wason, Jeff Duff, Dasha Bláhová, Mark Hembrow, Elizabeth Richmond, Ralph Cotterill, Wayne Snell | Comedy / Musical Feature film | IMDb |
| The Space Between the Door and the Floor | Pauline Chan | John Allen | Short film | IMDb |
| Spirits of the Air, Gremlins of the Clouds | Alex Proyas | Michael Lake, Melissa Davis, Norman Boyd | Adventure / Sci-Fi Feature film | IMDb |
| A Sting in the Tale | Eugene Schlusser | Diane Craig, Gary Day, Don Barker, John Noble, Lynne Williams, Tony Mack, Bob Newman, Patrick Edgeworth, Lyn Semmler, Edwin Hodgeman | Comedy Feature film | IMDb |
| Sweetie | Jane Campion | Genevieve Lemon, Karen Colston, Tom Lycos, Jon Darling, Dorothy Barry, Michael Lake, Andre Pataczek, Jean Hadgraft, Paul Livingston | Drama Feature film | IMDb, Entered into the 1989 Cannes Film Festival |
| Teenage Babylon | Graeme Wood | Juliette Armstrong, Caryn Clark, Brigette Gale | Short film | IMDb |
| Tender Hooks | Mary Callaghan | Jo Kennedy, Nique Needles, Anna Phillips, Robert Menzies, Ian Mortimer, Toni Scanlan, Gary Aron Cook, Simon Westaway, Kim Deacon, John Polson | Drama Feature film | IMDb |
| Tripe | Greg Woodland | Steven Houston, Sally McKenzie, John Meillon | Short film | IMDb |
| What the Moon Saw | Pino Amenta | Andrew Sheperd, Pat Evison, Mark Hennessy, Max Phipps, Danielle Spencer, Kim Gyngell, Jan Friedl, Kurt Ludescher, Adrian Wright, Ross Thompson, Gary Sweet | Adventure / Family Feature film | |

== See also ==
- 1989 in Australia
- 1989 in Australian television
