= Nigel Bradshaw =

British-born actor

- Born: Nigel William Bradshaw; 8 May 1951 (age 75); Camberley, Surrey, England, UK
- Occupation: Actor
- Years active: 1971–98, 2019-20

Nigel William Bradshaw (born 8 May 1951) is a British-born actor, who is best known for his role as in the Australian television series Prisoner as Officer Dennis Cruickshank.

== Career ==
Bradshaw apart from appearing in Prisoner, played Samuel Povey in the (BBC Television) adaptation of Arnold Bennett's The Old Wives' Tale, renamed for television as Sophia and Constance. In the late 1980s he also had a small role in the British soap opera, Brookside and followed this with a cameo in the Granada TV series, Coasting in 1990 and Peak Practice in 1998.

== Filmography ==
=== Film ===
Title	Year	Role	Type
1977	Spaghetti Two Step	1st Yobbo	TV movie
1985	I Live with Me Dad	Mr. Ross	TV movie
1986	Sky Pirates	Spencer	Feature film
1986	Death of a Soldier	Sgt. Rothberger	Feature film
1992	A Masculine Ending	Hugh Puddephat	TV movie

=== Television ===
Title	Year	Role	Type
1971	Comedy Playhouse		TV series
1975	The Venturers	Jimmy	TV series
1975	Country Tales		TV series
1975	Shadows	Young Man	TV series
1979	Crown Court	Kevin Walker	TV series
1983	The Nations Health	James Watson	TV series
1984	Play for Today	Mr Snape	TV series
1984	Special Squad	Gant	TV series, episode 1: "Trojan Horses"
1984	Carson's Law	Policeman	TV series
1985	Zoo Family	Bernie Barker	TV series
1985	ANZACS	Lt. Arbuckle	TV miniseries
1984–85	Prisoner	Dennis Cruickshank	TV series, 74 episodes
1986	Pokerface	Campion	TV miniseries
1988	Sophia and Constance	Samuel Povey	TV series
1989	Brookside	Victor	TV series
1990	Coasting	Assistant Building Contractor	TV series
1991	Screen Two	Clive Soley	TV series
1993	Neighbours	Alex Slater	TV series
1994	Blue Heelers	Ted Gilly	TV series
1994	Snowy River: The McGregor Saga	Thomas Pascoe	TV series
1997	Spark	Hotel Doorman	TV series
1998	Peak Practice	Councillor	TV series
2019–20	Our Town	Norman Cribbs	TV series
