= Evan Green (journalist) =

Australian journalist (1930–1996)

- Born: 21 May 1930; Fairfield
- Died: 16 March 1996 (aged 65); Melbourne
- Known for: motor racing commentary

Evan Clifford Symons Green (21 May 1930 – 16 March 1996) was an Australian motoring publicist, journalist, TV commentator and novelist. He was also a rally driver with international recognition. He wrote many articles about himself and his experiences while rally driving.

== Early life ==
He was born in the Sydney suburb of Fairfield in New South Wales, Australia. His first novel, Alice to Nowhere, was produced by Brendon Lumney into a two-part television mini-series in 1986 directed by John Power. The film starred John Waters as Johnny Parson, Steve Jacobs as Dave Mitchell and Rosey Jones as Barbara Dean.

== Motor racing ==
As a leading motoring journalist and being very well spoken, Green was a television commentator and interviewer for the Seven Network and was well known for his commentary at the Bathurst 1000 motor race from the 1960s until his last Bathurst race as commentator in 1983. Green would continue doing motor racing commentary both in Australia and New Zealand until 1987.

Evan Green was also a rally driver of international fame, competing in such events as the Round Australia Trial and the London-Sydney Marathon.

== Supercar scare ==
In 1972, Green was credited by the Australian performance motoring public for starting the media controversy, known as the Supercar scare, which ended the Ford XA Falcon GT-HO Phase IV, the Holden LJ Torana GTR XU-1 V8, and the rumored Valiant VH Charger fitted with a Chrysler V8 engine. (Former Chrysler Australia executives and their test driver, leading racer Leo Geoghegan, denied that the Charger was to be fitted with a high performance V8. However, in subsequent years it was revealed that Chrysler Australia did experiment with a 340ci-powered VG Valiant coupe that "went like Hell" according to the Geoghegan brothers. Test mules were fitted with both the V8 and the Hemi-6 and was tested at the Mallala raceway in South Australia, with the 6cyl proving significantly faster due to less weight at the front of the car).

As a result of the Supercar scare, Green was often shunned or given short answers when he tried to do grid or pit interviews with Australian motor racing legends Harry Firth (Holden) and Allan Moffat (Ford), both of whom had been involved in the development of cars that had been killed off. For his part, Harry Firth's Holden Dealer Team had completed virtually all the testing and development of the V8 Torana (both on and off the race track), and years later said in an interview with Australian Muscle Car magazine that "Evan Green was no friend of mine".

Despite his role in starting the Supercar scare, Green would subsequently become a director at GM-Holden.

== Selected works ==
- Journeys with Gelignite Jack (1966), Angus & Robertson. Also in a new edition Hit the Road, Jack (1991), Pan Macmillan. The story of a tough outback journey undertaken for Castrol, in which his life-long friend and fellow rally driver Jack Murray figures prominently.
- Dust and Glory (1990), Macmillan. A novel whose action takes place in the fictitious 1956 Redex Trial (the last Redex Reliability Trial was in 1955). Several real-life characters appear, notably "Gelignite Jack", and Jack Davey, who in the book longs to be taken seriously as a rally driver rather than for his celebrity. Green himself is thinly disguised as journalist Harley "Norton" Alexander.

His other novels include: Adam's Empire, Kalinda, Bet Your life, On Borrowed Time, Clancy's Crossing and A Bootfull of Right Arms - covering his adventures during the 1974 London—Sahara—Munich World Cup Rally in an Australian Leyland P76 V8.

== Family ==
Green's son Gavin served two stints as editor of the British motoring magazine Car.
