= Tender Hooks =

- Directed by: Mary Callaghan
- Written by: Mary Callaghan
- Produced by: Chris Oliver
- Starring: Jo Kennedy; Nique Needles; John Polson
- Release date: 1988
- Country: Australia
- Language: English
- Budget: $797,977
- Box office: A$40,000 (Australia)

Tender Hooks is a 1988 Australian romantic comedy drama film directed by Mary Callaghan and starring Jo Kennedy and Nique Needles. The film tells the story of Mitchell and Rex, a young Sydney couple who struggle with their clashing natures. It was Callaghan's first and only feature film.

== Plot ==
In late 1980s Sydney, Mitchell Leigh (nicknamed Mitch) is a young woman living in a run-down Manly apartment building when she falls for the mischievous and charming Rex Reeson, fresh out of jail. Their relationship is loving and sweet but turbulent, as both struggle with clashing personalities and backgrounds.

While Mitchell works in a hair salon and attempts to make a life for herself and Rex, she becomes frustrated with his immaturity and tendency to fall back into criminal offending. Meanwhile their mutual friend Gayle, who grew up with Rex in state care and now divides her time between sex work and shifts at the salon with Mitchell, finds herself in a clearly violent and toxic abusive relationship. As Mitchell supports her through it, she wonders about the nature of her own more ambiguous relationship with Rex.

Eventually, Rex finds himself in jail again and Mitchell continues to support him. When he escapes shortly before the end of his sentence, Mitchell visits him as he hides out from the police in a Kings Cross hotel room and angrily confronts him about his reckless behaviour. Meanwhile, an unrelated siege is taking place which leads the police to block off the area.

Rex and his criminal friends then decide to leave Sydney and head for the North Coast. Mitchell appears to be joining them, but then gets out of the car at the last minute as they approach a police checkpoint. They share a final tender moment together and part on good terms before Mitch walks away.

As the film ends, she watches from a distance as Rex gets out of the car and speaks briefly to a police officer - who then removes a barricade, allowing them to drive on.

== Cast ==
- Jo Kennedy as Mitchell Leigh ("Mitch")
- Nique Needles as Rex Reeson
- Anna Phillips as Gayle
- John Polson as Tony
- Shane Connor as Wayne
- Simon Westaway as Motorcycle Cop
- Reg Mombassa (cameo)

== Production ==
Producer Chris Oliver met Callaghan at Swinburne Film and Television School in the early 70s, then crossed paths with her again in Sydney during the early 1980s. He was drawn to Callaghan's script that ultimately became Tender Hooks (then titled Contact Visit) seeing it as an opportunity to move away from documentaries to "social realism" along the lines of Callaghan's earlier short film Greetings from Wollongong.

The original inspiration for the film came from a female friend of Callaghan's who regularly visited a boyfriend in jail. Callaghan noticed that not only was he "gradually hardening" from life in prison but that her life had become "suspended" as well, meaning they were both effectively "doing time". She told The Age:

I chose to look at prison and the prisoner from the point of view of the loved one - of the visitor, which is what I know - how Mitch is imprisoned by her love for Rex and the conflict it induces in both their lives... With Tender Hooks, I wanted to foster understanding through entertainment. It looks at society from the outside, from the point of view of characters who don't easily slot into it. Like any sub-culture, these characters say as much about the dominant culture as they do about themselves.

The siege towards the end of the film is also based on a real incident. In February 1984, John Hay, a former opal miner who owned a gem store in Kings Cross, wired the building with gelignite and detonators and threatened to blow himself up along with the Hyatt-Kingsgate Hotel and pillars supporting an underground pedestrian tunnel. He claimed to be protesting the "Asian takeover of Australia" plus a dispute with the building's lease owner, as well as marking the first anniversary of the death of his wife. Hay ultimately surrendered to police without incident after ten hours of negotiations.

Oliver began seeking funding for the film in 1983. After a lengthy and complicated process involving multiple backers, pre-production finally began in August 1987. The shoot proved difficult for many reasons, including various technical issues and the fact that the script called for "over forty noisy, no-parking inner-city locations, many of them night exteriors, which had to be shot in 33 ten-hour days".

This was Kennedy's third feature film, having had her breakout role in the 1982 musical Starstruck then deciding to take her career in a new dramatic direction with 1985's Wrong World. Kennedy sought a "precarious" balance in depicting Mitchell, not wanting to make her seem like a victim while also trying to avoid overplaying her strength. Callaghan praised her performance, saying the subtlety of the role was achieved "not with (Kennedy's) actions... but through a kind of intelligence that crosses her face". Both cited Mike Leigh as an influence.

According to The Sydney Morning Herald, at one stage Needles and Kennedy dated in real life. They had previously appeared on stage together as siblings in the 1982 Nimrod Theatre Company production of The Kid and also both had small roles in the 1984 film The Boy Who Had Everything.

== Soundtrack ==
The film features several songs from The Stetsons' debut self-titled album, including "Live This Way" which serves as the film's overture. Other acts featured include Paul Kelly and Ganggajang.

== Release ==
One early screening took place at UCLA in November 1988. An Australian theatrical release followed in February 1989.

Tender Hooks was released on VHS in Australia in the late 1980s. In recent years, it has been issued on DVD and video on demand by Ronin Films. This version is sourced from the VHS.

== Reception ==
Tender Hooks was positively received in Australia. The Sun-Herald called it a "richly-observed slice of life drama (with) the relaxed air of ad libbed conversation... not only fascinating aspects of modern Australia but also sparkling entertainment which labels everyone associated with it as major talents to watch out for." Evan Williams wrote in The Australian that the film was one of "exquisite reverberations, tenderness and apprehension... Expect to be quietly pleased, lightly amused, and sent off a little wiser." Karen Polglaze of The Canberra Times called the film "realistic and sensitive" and a "must". Filmnews wrote that Callaghan "soars above mediocrity and cheap tricks in a cynical film industry by writing her characters a responsive way out of their situation and giving the film a non-sensationalised ending... Tender Hooks is on the way up and let's hope you are too, Mary Callaghan."
