= As Time Goes By (1988 film) =

- Film poster
- Directed by: Barry Peak
- Written by: Barry Peak
- Produced by: Chris Kiely
- Starring: Max Gillies; Bruno Lawrence; Nique Needles
- Cinematography: John Ogden
- Edited by: Ralph Strasser
- Music by: Peter Sullivan
- Release date: 1988
- Running time: 96 minutes
- Country: Australia
- Language: English
- Box office: AU $5,854

As Time Goes By (originally titled The Cricketer) is a 1988 Australian science fiction comedy film directed by Barry Peak and starring Max Gillies, Bruno Lawrence, and Nique Needles. A few bars of the title song (extracted from the film Casablanca) are heard in the Australian version of the film but not in overseas prints, because of its high cost.

== Plot synopsis ==
Mike, a surfer from Penong, South Australia, receives from his dying mother a letter, written 25 years earlier, instructing him to meet its author at a spot 50 miles (80 km) west of the small town of Dingo on a certain date in 1989. The writer turns out to be an oddball alien in a time-travelling spaceship disguised as a roadside diner, "Joe Bogart's", dating from Manhattan Project-era Los Alamos, New Mexico. On the way he encounters Ryder, once a famous cricketer but now a small-town policeman, on the trail of a murderous motorcyclist and his sidecar-riding sidekick – accomplices of Weston, a land-grabbing weather watcher who believes the desert is about to become valuable pasture, and who develops a temporary alliance with McCauley, a UFO hunter who will stop at nothing in his quest for fame and fortune.

It is the surfer's pre-ordained purpose to recover the spaceship's power module, which had been lost overboard, but is frustrated in his quest by Cheryl, a ditzy fellow-hitchhiker, who fancies it as a hat (it is disguised as a "King Beer" emblem) and the UFO hunter, who believes he can discover something by prising it open. He is assisted by his love interest Connie, a beautiful Mini-moke-driving farmer. Other characters include a weathered old bone collector, who hauls his "finds" in an ancient hand-cart, and Dingo's town storekeeper, involved in a never-ending fight against dust in his shop.

== Cast ==
- Bruno Lawrence as Ryder
- Nique Needles as Mike
- Ray Barrett as J. L. Weston
- Marcelle Schmitz as Connie Stanton
- Mitchell Faircloth as James McCauley
- Max Gillies as Joe Bogart
- Deborah Force as Cheryl
- Christine Keogh as Margie
- Don Bridges as Ern
- Jane Clifton as Mechanic

== Accolades ==
Nique Needles won Best Actor in A Science Fiction Film (billed as L'Australieno) at the 1988 Fantafestival.

Tony Harrison called the film "bizarre and entertaining".

== Home media ==
The film was released to VHS but not DVD.
