= Brinsley Road Community School =

Coordinates: 37°49′44″S 145°4′9″E

Information
- Established: 1973
- Grades: 7–12

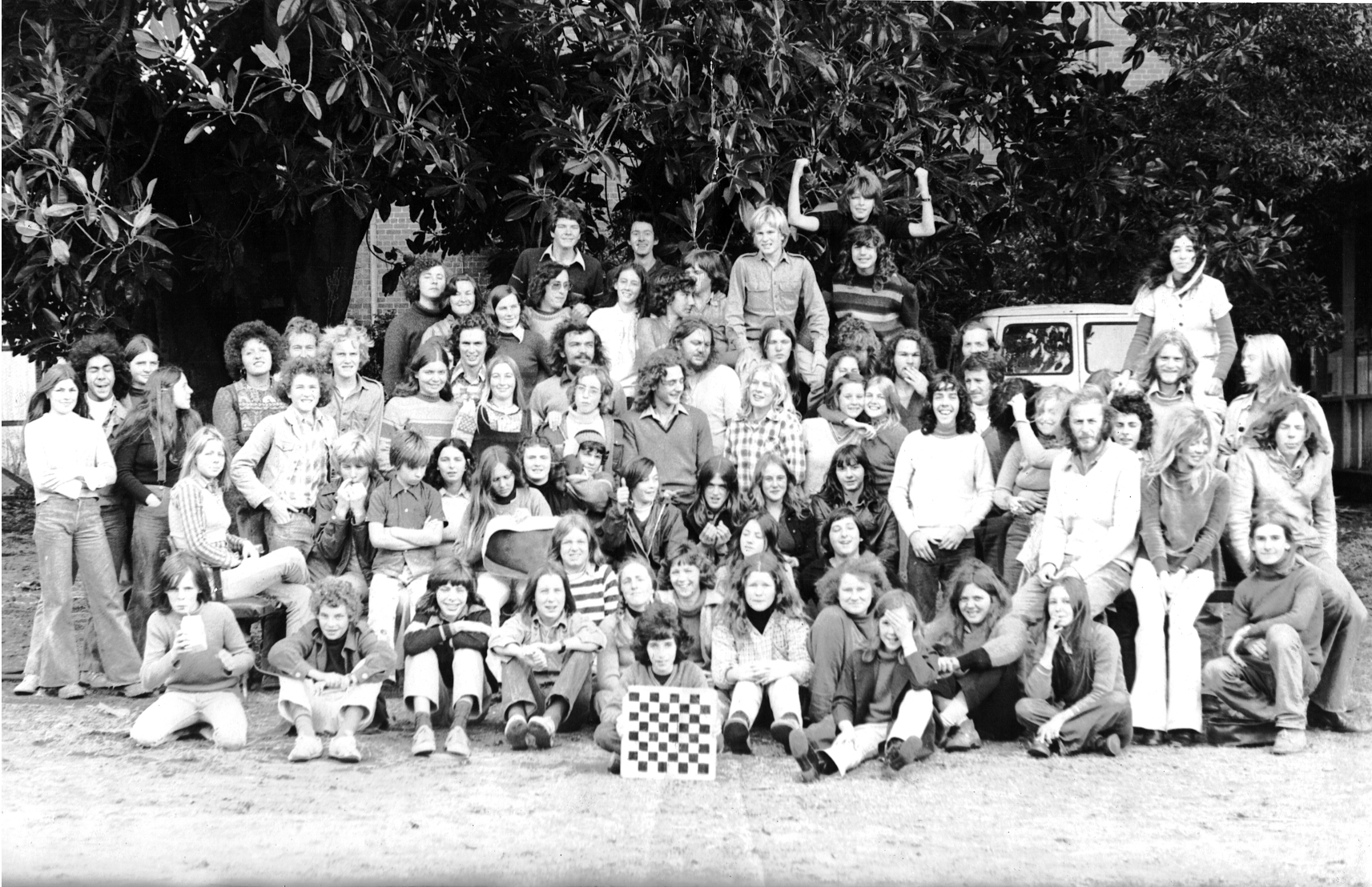
Argo Street School students and staff, circa 1975

Brinsley Road Community School was a state-run high school (years 7–12) in the suburb of Camberwell, in Melbourne, Victoria, Australia. The school was established in February 1973 under the umbrella of Camberwell High School with the support of Camberwell High School's progressive principal Margaret Essex. The school was formally referred to by the Education Department as the "Camberwell High Annex".

== School philosophy and history ==
The concept for the school was developed by Roy Irvine, its initial coordinator, who convinced Mr Schrum, then Director of Secondary Schools in Victoria, of the need for the alternative form of education that the school would offer.

The school started with 100 students from forms 1 to 6 (years 7 to 12), many of whom with talents and aspirations that had little chance of being developed in conventional more structured state high schools of the time. The school occupied a rambling old mansion that was previously used as a children's hostel by the Salvation Army. The mansion was originally owned by the Baillieu family. The school buildings have now been demolished. The site and grounds now form the Brinsley Nature Reserve.

The school, also referred to as an "open school", aimed to provide opportunities for students to become both experience-oriented and knowledge-oriented.

After several relocations, the original school concept is still operating as the Caulfield Park Community School.

The school was located at:

- Brinsley Road from 1973 to 1974
- Argo Street South Yarra during 1975
- Fitzroy Street St Kilda, from 2nd term 1976, in the hall of the St Kilda Uniting Church, later including the house attached to the church on Princes St.
- Balaclava Road Caulfield up to 2007

The school provided educational programs in arts, sciences, mathematics, and media. It also had programs for vocational courses such as welding and woodwork.

== Principals ==
(Irvine, Smith, Schapper and Tasker were titled 'School Co-ordinators')

- Roy Irvine, 1973–1974 (Brinsley Road)
- John White, 1975 (Argo Street)
- David Schapper, 1976 (St Kilda Alternative School)
- Alan Tasker, 1977 (St Kilda Alternative School)
- David Roycroft, 2007 (Caulfield Park Community School)

== Notable teachers ==
- Rod Moss, Artist

== Notable alumni ==
- Dr. Catriona Moore, feminist art scholar
- Polly Borland, photographer
- Richard Lowenstein, film director
- Ray Argall, filmmaker
- Lisa Gerrard, singer/composer
