= Ray Argall =

Australian film and television director

Ray Argall AM
- Born: 31 May 1957 (age 69); Box Hill, Victoria, Australia
- Education: Australian Film, Television and Radio School
- Occupations: Film and television director, cinematographer, screenwriter, editor
- Years active: 1975–present
- Organization: Piccolo Films
- Notable work: Return Home (1990)
- Spouse: Lucinda Clutterbuck

Raymond Charles Argall AM (born 31 May 1957) is an Australian cinematographer, director, and editor. His feature film Return Home (1990) is regarded by many critics as an Australian cinema classic. Argall served on the board of the Australian Directors Guild for 16 years, holding the position of president from 2006 to 2015 and secretary from 2015 to 2017. In 2016, Argall launched a business restoring archival films through his production company Piccolo Films.

== Early life and education ==
Raymond Charles Argall was born on 31 May 1957 in the Melbourne suburb of Box Hill.

As a teenager Argall attended the state-run alternative high school Brinsley Road Community School in the Melbourne suburb of Camberwell. There he became involved in photography and super-8 filmmaking and in 1975 received support for his first 16mm short film entitled Morning Rite from the Australian Film Institute's Experimental Film and Television Fund. He continued making short films, including Coma (1975) and Parnassus (1977), while working as a boom swinger and assistant on other film productions and TV commercials. At this time, he also became a member of the Melbourne Filmmakers Cooperative. In 1979 Argall received a Diploma in Editing from Sydney's Australian Film & Television School (later the Australian Film Television and Radio School).

== Career ==
=== 1980s ===
In 1980 he returned to Melbourne to join the Australian Broadcasting Corporation (ABC) as a sound editor. A year later, he left the ABC to form Musical Films with fellow film school graduate, producer John Cruthers. Encompassing a group of young Melbourne filmmakers, including Elisa Argenzio, Cristina Pozzan, and Daniel Scharf, Musical Films concentrated on the Australian music video scene which in this era became a fertile ground for visual experimentation as well as a way for young filmmakers to earn a living.

During the 1980s Argall made over 40 music videos for many of Australia's leading rock artists, including Midnight Oil, Crowded House, Renee Geyer, Hoodoo Gurus, Split Enz, Models, Black Sorrows/Joe Camilleri as well as feature-length music documentaries/concert films. He worked as a cinematographer on many other music videos, including those for Hunters and Collectors, I'm Talking, Cold Chisel, and Men at Work and as an editor and cinematographer for independent filmmakers on shorts, documentaries and feature films, while continuing to make his own short dramas.

Argall's most notable collaborations in this period were with directors Brian McKenzie and Ian Pringle. In a working relationship with McKenzie which has continued for over thirty years, Argall has taken various roles on both McKenzie's documentaries and his dramas. Argall was cinematographer on all of Pringle's distinctive feature films which were well received at prestigious European Film Festivals, including Cannes and Berlin. Argall's work on these films garnered him a number of cinematography awards, most notably from the Australian Cinematographers Society which honoured him with accreditation in 1989. In this same year, Argall wrote and directed his first feature film Return Home.

=== 1990s ===
On its release in 1990, Return Home was met with widespread critical acclaim, receiving that year's Best Director award from the Australian Film Institute and the awards for Best Director and Best Film from the Film Critics Circle of Australia. It screened at Berlin, Edinburgh, Seattle and other international Festivals. Return Home which was dubbed a "gem" of the Australian cinema was remastered in 2002 for the National Film & Sound Archive's Kodak/Atlab Cinema Collection of Australian classics. It was the first feature photographed by 25 year-old cinematographer Mandy Walker, who had been assisting and operating for Argall and working as Director of Photography on his shorter directing projects.

During the 1990s Argall continued to work as a cinematographer while also directing for film and television, including as a set-up director for the popular 1997 ABC drama series SeaChange. He made a second feature film Eight Ball in 1991.

=== 2000s ===
Despite increasing demands on Argall's time from the Australian Directors Guild, of which he became president in 2006, he continued his screen work into the 2000s, both as a director and a cinematographer. Most notably, he was a set-up director for the ABC television series MDA (2002-2003) and as a cinematographer photographed the widely acclaimed feature film Look Both Ways (2005), written and directed by Sarah Watt. He also continued to work in documentary and music films and with his wife, animator Lucinda Clutterbuck.

== ADG work ==
During Argall's nine-year presidency and two-years as secretary of the Australian Directors Guild, he was deeply involved in its registration as an Australian trade union under the Fair Work (Registered Organisations) Act 2009, a goal finally achieved in 2015 after several years of effort.

In line with the ADG's understanding of the increasing impact on Australian screen of globalisation, Argall officially represented Australia in the founding of the International Federation of Coalitions for Cultural Diversity in Seville in 2007 and became the Asia Pacific member of the Federation Board. During Argall's presidency the ADG maintained relationships with overseas directors' organisations, notably through the International Association of English Speaking Directors Organisations (IAESDO). These organisations included, among others, the Directors Guild of America, the Directors Guild of Canada, and the Screen Directors Guild of New Zealand. Discussions about collaborations and events were also held with European guilds and the Federation of European Film Directors, but the ADG came to believe that it did not have the resources to realise these ambitions.

== Piccolo Films ==
Argall and his wife Lucinda Clutterbuck continue to run their production company Piccolo Films. The company was established in 2016, with Argall specialising in the digital scanning and restoration of archival films. He started with his own films and then started on other filmmakers' work, including Winter's Harvest (Brian McKenzie, 1979), Lost (Jo Kennedy, 1999), Me and Daphne (David Hay, Martha Ansara, 1977) and the re-release of Australian Made Redux (Richard Lowenstein,1987).

== Recognition and awards ==
In 2018 the ADG presented Argall with its Cecil Holmes Award.

In June 2019 he was made a Member of the Order of Australia (AM), "For significant service to film and television as a director and cinematographer".

== Favourite films ==
In 2022, Argall participated in the Sight & Sound film polls of that year. It is held every ten years to select the greatest films of all time, by asking contemporary directors to select ten films of their choice.

Argall's selections were:

- American Graffiti (1973)
- Two-lane Blacktop (1971)
- Pickpocket (1959)
- Proof (1991)
- The Truman Show (1998)
- The Rider (2017)
- Samson & Delilah (2009)
- Bill and Ted's Excellent Adventure (1989)
- Exotica (1994)
- Malcolm (1986)
