= A Masculine Ending =

1987 novel by Joan Smith

- First edition
- Author: Joan Smith
- Language: English
- Genre: Crime
- Publisher: Faber and Faber
- Publication date: April 27, 1987
- Publication place: United Kingdom
- Media type: Print (Hardback) & Paperback
- Pages: 186 pp
- ISBN: 0-571-14751-8
- OCLC: 15084920

A Masculine Ending is a novel by Joan Smith. It was first published in 1987 by British firm Faber and Faber.

== 1992 television adaptation ==
The story was adapted for television in 1992. The cast included:

- Janet McTeer – Loretta Lawson
- Imelda Staunton – Bridget Bennet
- Paul Brooke – Humphrey Morris
- Suzanna Hamilton – Veronica Puddephat
- Joanna McCallum – Miriam Morris
- Kevin McNally – Andrew Gardner
- Bill Nighy – John Tracey
- Clarke Peters – Theo Sykes
- Greg Wise – Jamie Baird
- Buki Armstrong - Bethany Edwards
- Charlotte Cornwell – Insp. Parkinson
- Matyelock Gibbs - Elizabeth Grant
- Peter Lovstrom - Arthur Goodchild
- Andrew Seear - Coroner
- Richard Vernon – Miriam's father
- Phillip Anthony - Mr Koogan
- Yves Aubert as French porter
- Nigel Bradshaw - Hugh Puddephat
- Lucy Briers - Student
- Lolita Chakrabarti - Sue
- Sophia Diaz - Sylvie
- Jennifer Gibson - Melanie Gandell
- Toby Whithouse - Student
- Harry Davenport, Kate McEnery, Simon Owen, and Matthew Owens - The Morris Children

== Plot ==
Feminist academics Loretta Lawson and Bridget Bennett, investigate the discovery of a body that disappeared while Lawson attended a symposium in Paris.
