= Angela Tiatia =

New Zealand-Australian artist

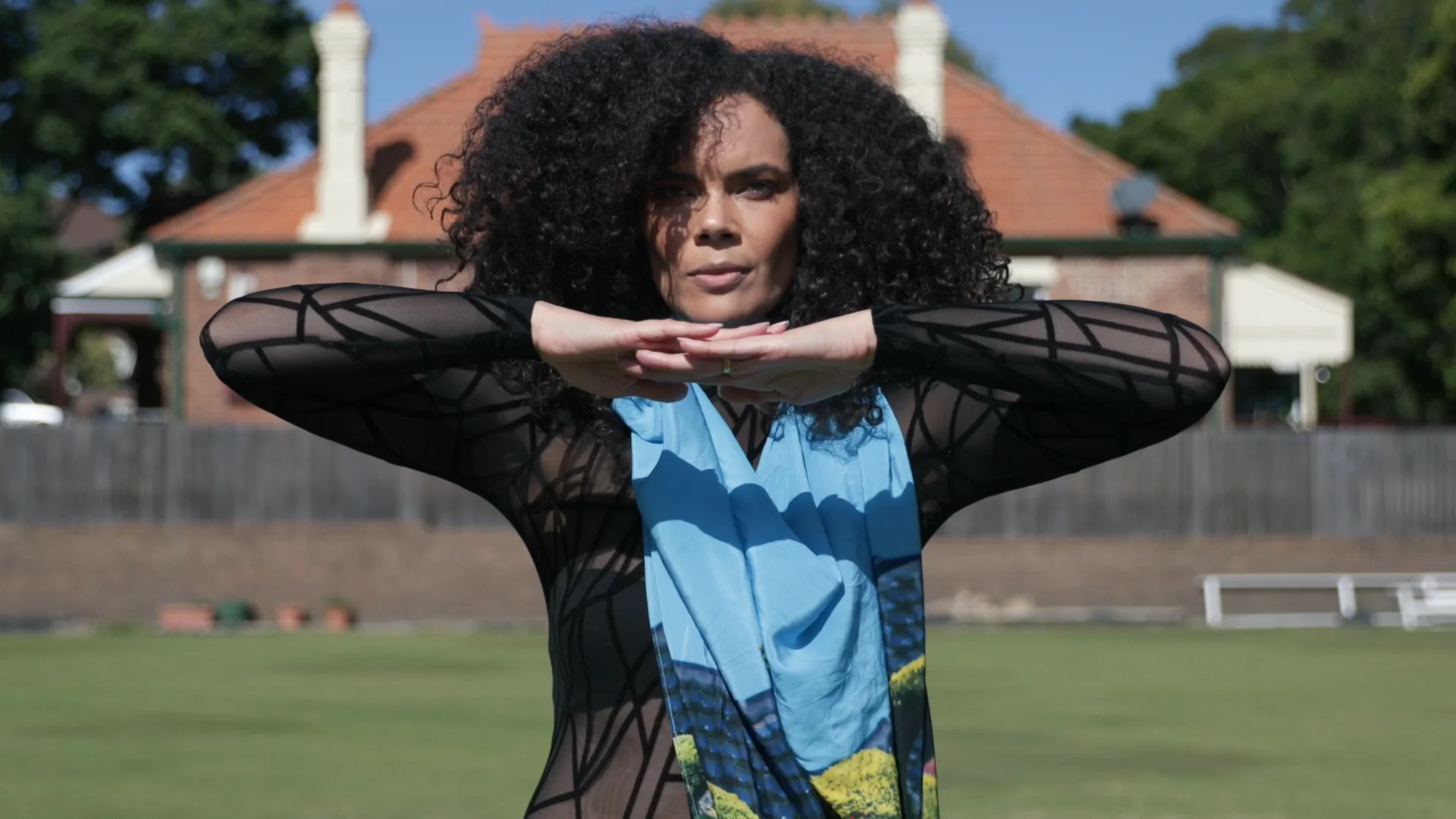
- Tiatia in A Body of Work, in 2018
- Born: Auckland, New Zealand
- Education: University of Auckland; Auckland University of Technology
- Notable work: Walking the Wall (2014); Heels (2014); The Fall (2017)

Angela Tiatia (born 1973) is a New Zealand-Australian artist.

She works with paint, sculpture, video installation, and performance art. Tiatia's work explores contemporary culture, with particular attention to gender, race, neocolonialism and the effects of climate change on the Pacific.

Tiatia's work has frequently been singled out on a national and international stage. Her 2017 installations, The Fall, was met with widespread acclaim and critical recognition.

== Early life and education ==
Tiatia was born 1973 in Auckland, New Zealand. Her great-grandfather was a Chinese immigrant to Samoa. Tiatia's mother emigrated to Auckland from Samoa in the 1960s in order to find a job in a factory as part of a government push to bolster the country's growing economy.

Tiatia studied commerce at the University of Auckland, graduating in 2002. In 2010, she graduated from Auckland University of Technology (AUT), with a degree in visual arts. While much of the artist's later career has been defined by her video and photographic work, her application to AUT was based around her painting.

=== Modelling career ===
Tiatia's mother was wary of her daughter beginning a career in the arts, which she considered a difficult field with not much hope of financial security. Tiatia instead chose to pursue a career in modeling in her teens and early twenties. In 2019, she told I-D magazine that the experience served as a parallel to her religious upbringing, describing that "[t]he sense of control that was over my body as a Christian woman was completely different too ... I was told how to cover up and what to eat. On the flip side to that you'd think there was a lot of freedom in the fashion industry, but I was under immense control. Again I was told what to wear, what to eat and how my body was to look." These two systems gave her an understanding of what she described as a lack of female agency over their own bodies. Tiatia no longer considers herself religious, citing her experience as a questioning child in Sunday school as an example of the curious nature that led her away from her Christian upbringing.

Tiatia later addressed the similarities and contradictions of the religious and modelling worlds in her 2014 art pieces Heels and Walking the Wall, which see her openly displaying her sacred malu, or female-specific Samoan tattoo. For Tiatia, this demonstration meant confronting a cultural taboo from her childhood while simultaneously embracing and examining the symbols of female agency that she had come across in her modeling.

== Career ==
Tiatia intends her work to call attention to culture's interaction with the commodification of body and place brought on by neocolonialism. She said in 2018 that her art is meant to examine "how the Pacific body/place/experience has been stereotyped through images/media/popular culture/art over the last 150 years. Within this time frame, I explore ways in which I can challenge these stereotypes and create new narratives and imagery. As well as this, I also look at the universality of the human experience and the human condition that binds us all."

Tiatia's focus on neo-colonialism also takes into account the increasing wealth gap in international economics. "The gradual nature of this growing inequality is deceiving because it normalises the problem - we don't notice the change because it's incremental," she said in 2014. Tiatia considers her work an opportunity to spark conversation about this issue.

Since The Fall, Tiatia has repeatedly cast the same performers in her films, which she described to Ocula Magazine as intentionally allowing each new work to become an opportunity for her and her collaborators to "check in on each another" and, in the process, build strong communities and lasting artistic relationships.

In June 2018, Tiatia was awarded the Ravenswood Australian Women's Art Prize, the richest professional art prize for women in Australia. The award, valued at A$35,000, was granted on the basis of Tiatia's video installation The Fall, a production inspired by the Fall of Singapore. In a single take, the five-minute film uses a cast of 30 performers, playing 60 characters, to tell the story of the 1942 battle in a full 360-degree navigation of the space, ending with Tiatia and her camera crew's own image. While the work was commissioned by the Australian War Memorial with the intention of telling a specific historical story, Tiatia also considered The Fall an opportunity to hold a mirror up to modern political turmoil. She wanted the project to be a reminder of the failings of history, and hoped that audiences would gain a new understanding of alternative historical outcomes as a part of their examination of the project.

In 2022, Tiatia received the Ian Potter Moving Image Commission, a $100,000 commission for Australian artists to produce new moving image works, awarded by The Ian Potter Cultural Trust for exhibition at the Australian Centre for the Moving Image (ACMI). The resulting video installation, The Dark Current, which included photographic prints, premiered at ACMI in September 2023 and is structured in three parts representing past, present and future. It opens on a woman with a pearl set in the corner of her eye, slowly engulfed by water, an image Tiatia has described as an allegory of the promise that drew her mother's generation from the Pacific Islands to the West in the 1960s. The Sāmoan-Persian artist, curator and scholar Léuli Eshrāghi writes that the work "places glamour, beauty and strength in the cultural memory of generations of Indigenous women of the Great Ocean".

Her work has been spotlighted by several national and international exhibitions, including the National Museum of Singapore, the 57th Venice Biennale, and the Queensland Art Gallery.

Tiatia's works are held in the collections of Queensland Art Gallery, National Gallery of Victoria, Museum of New Zealand Te Papa Tongarewa, Christchurch Art Gallery, The University of Queensland, Art Gallery of New South Wales, Museum of Contemporary Art, Australian Museum, Australian Centre for the Moving Image, Australian War Memorial Museum, Canberra Institute of Contemporary Art and Perth Institute of Contemporary Art.

== Awards and accolades ==
Along with recognition for The Fall, in 2011 Tiatia was a finalist for the Bold Horizons National Art Award. She has also been a finalist for the John Fries Award twice (in 2016 and 2017). In 2017 she was a finalist for the Paramor Prize: Art + Innovation, and in 2018 she was a finalist for the Archibald Prize.

In October 2018 she announced as the recipient of the 2018 Creative New Zealand Contemporary Pacific Artist Award. Presented by the Arts Council of New Zealand Toi Aotearoa, the award is one of the only national awards for Pasifika artists across all art forms. It recognises "an artist who has demonstrated innovation, who has continually pushed the boundaries of their practice, and who has achieved excellence in their field."

In 2022 she was awarded the Ian Potter Moving Image Commission, which funded The Dark Current.
