= The Plains of Heaven =

- Directed by: Ian Pringle
- Written by: Doug Ling; Elizabeth Parsons; Ian Pringle
- Produced by: John Cruthers
- Starring: Reg Evans; Gerard Kennedy
- Cinematography: Ray Argall
- Edited by: Ray Argall
- Music by: Andrew Duffield
- Production company: Seon Films
- Release date: 1982
- Running time: 80 minutes
- Country: Australia
- Language: English
- Budget: AU$160,000

The Plains of Heaven is a 1982 Australian film directed by Ian Pringle, about two men at a remote satellite relay station who contemplate their obsessions. The film was re-released in the USA as Panic Station.

Ian Pringle shared the Interfilm Jury Prize for The Plains of Heaven at the Mannheim-Heidelberg International Film festival in 1982.

== Cast ==
- Richard Moir as Barker
- Reg Evans as Cunningham
- Gerard Kennedy as Lenko
- John Flaus as Land Rover owner
- Jenny Cartledge as Nurse
- Brian McKenzie as Lewis

== Production ==
The film was made for a budget of $100,000, which came to $160,000 after deferrals and a marketing grant. $60,000 came from the Creative Development Branch of the Australian Film Commission and the film was shot at Falls Creek in the Bogong High Plans over four weeks. Pringle says the film ran out of money three weeks into the shoot but they managed to find more to finish it.
