= Pokerface (miniseries) =

- Written by: Bill Garner; Peter Corris
- Directed by: Richard Sarell
- Starring: Bruno Lawrence; Jo Kennedy
- Country of origin: Australia
- Original language: English
- No. of episodes: 3 x 1 hour

Original release
- Network: ABC
- Release: 9 October – 23 October 1986

Pokerface is a 1986 miniseries about a former journalist who works as an undercover agent for Australia's secret service.

Bill Garner was friends with Peter Corris. Garner arranged for the ABC to commission an espionage mini series and he wrote it with Corris. Corris recalled, "it was bloody good. Bruno Lawrence... was terrific, very tough guy. So we did that and then I novelised our script, Penguin published it, it did well, and that kicked off the Crawly series. Bill would provide the basic idea, they were set in different places. They [the books] started really well but failed badly."

== Cast ==
- Bruno Lawrence as Ray 'Creepy' Crawley
- Jo Kennedy as Roxy
- Nigel Bradshaw aa Campion
- Tim Robertson as Huck
- Richard Moss as Miles
- Paul Mason as Snow
- Melita Jurisic as Lou
- Maud Clark as Steph
