= Alice to Nowhere =

1986 miniseries by John Power

- Directed by: John Power
- Screenplay by: David Boutland
- Based on: novel by Evan Green
- Produced by: Brendon Lunney
- Starring: John Waters; Steven Jacobs; Rosey Jones; Esben Storm
- Cinematography: David Connell
- Edited by: Ralph Strasser
- Music by: Peter Best
- Production company: Crawford Productions
- Release date: 30 June 1986
- Running time: 2 × 2 hours
- Country: Australia
- Language: English
- Budget: $2.8 million

Alice to Nowhere is a 1986 Australian miniseries set in the outback in 1954. The setting for much of the action is the Birdsville Track.

== Plot ==
Jewel thieves Johnny and Frog plant a stolen opal necklace in the luggage of Barbara, a bush nurse. They follow her to Alice Springs in an attempt to retrieve the jewellery, by rail to Marree, South Australia, then towards Birdsville on a mail truck operated by Dave Mitchell in a service similar to that provided by the real-life Tom Kruse. After failing to extract the stolen goods, they hijack the truck by threatening the nurse and Dave's off-sider Ivan. Dave has little choice but complete his journey, appeasing the gangsters in an attempt to avoid bloodshed. As the truck nears its destination the crew encounter various difficulties and situations, while Johnny progressively reveals himself as a sadistic killer and Frog his hapless accomplice.

== Cast ==
- John Waters as Johnny Parson
- Steven Jacobs as Dave Mitchell
- Rosey Jones as Barbara Dean
- Esben Storm as Raymond 'Frog' Gardiner
- Slawomir Wabik as Ivan
- Ruth Cracknell as Mrs Spencer
- John Clayton as Sgt Wallace
- Joy Smithers as Betty Spencer
- Peter Fisher as Bill Scott

== Production ==
Alice to Nowhere is based on the Evan Green novel of the same name. It was made by Crawford Productions with a projected budget of $2.8 million. Much of the film was shot in the Flinders Ranges, Simpson Desert and Broken Hill.

== DVD release ==
Crawford Productions announced that the miniseries would be released on DVD in 2025.

== Reception ==
The show enjoyed reasonable ratings when it aired. Albert Moran praised the film for its "drive, pace and nervous involvement" as displayed by such American directors as Raoul Walsh or Nicholas Ray.

The Age's Barbara Hooks says the series "has some simply splendid attributes in terms of production and performance. Unfortunately, they seem to throw its silly and avoidable mistakes into stark relief." Suzanne Borlase of the Sydney Morning Herald praised the mini-series, saying it "is a gripping action-packed drama set in the vast emptiness of the Australian Outback. At once an adventure, a tale of madness and a love story, it is worth watching for the scenery alone." Helen O'Neil, also from the Sydney Morning Herald, reviewed it positively when it was repeated in 1990. She finished "Alice to Nowhere is a nicely handled, gruelling watch – and an argument, if ever there was need of one, for having more than 10 minutes between ad breaks. Repeat runs of this quality can't be missed.

Also commenting on the 1990 repeat, Paul Leadon of the Sydney Morning Herald gave it a bad review, writing that "Johnny and Frog were a pair of incompetent outback psychopaths in search of a better mini-series script." The Mercury News' David N. Rosenthal was also critical. He writes "What this 1986 miniseries, which stars no one you ever heard of, demonstrates all too vividly is that Australian television may not be Down Under's finest export -- at least in every instance."

== Differences from the book ==
In the book by Evan Green, the opals are unset gems not a necklace, owned by a wealthy American not a gift for Queen Elizabeth, and stashed in a hotel safe in Alice Springs not a gallery in Melbourne. "Frog" is a specialist safecracker and Johnny is the sociopathic ringleader. They are caught red-handed by the cleaning lady, whom Johnny bludgeons to death. They get away in their stolen car, planning to return to "The Alice" while the police are looking for villains fleeing the scene. Their cunning ruse comes undone when they are forced to abandon the vehicle, having bent its tie rod. They surreptitiously board the south-bound "Ghan", leaving it at Marree when the train is about to be searched. From this point, the film is more faithful to the book.
