= Joan Smith =

English novelist, journalist and human rights activist

Joan Alison Smith
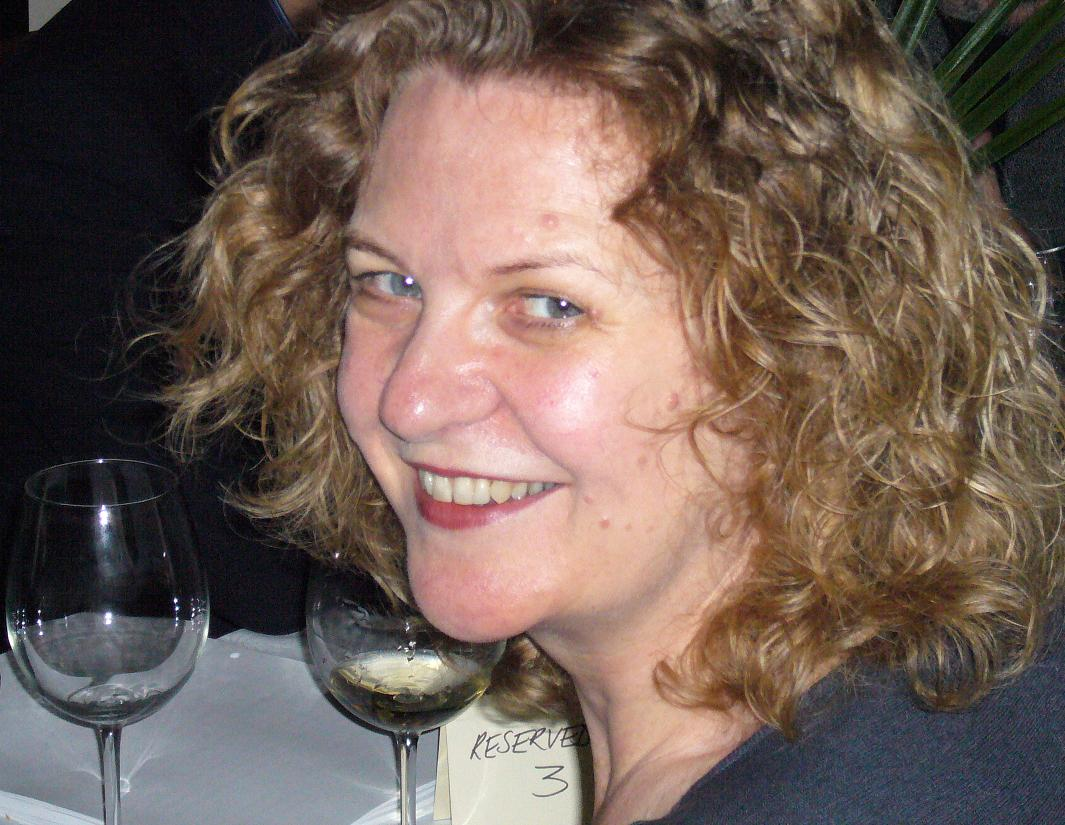
- Joan Smith
- Born: 27 August 1953 (age 73); London, England, UK
- Education: University of Reading
- Spouse: Francis Wheen (1985–1993)
- Partner: Denis MacShane (2003–2010)

Joan Alison Smith (born 27 August 1953) is an English journalist, novelist, and human rights activist who is a former chair of the Writers in Prison committee in the English section of International PEN and was the Executive Director of Hacked Off.

== Life and work ==
Smith was born 27 August 1953 in London, the daughter of Alan Smith, a park superintendent, and Ann Anita Smith (née Coltman). She attended the Girls’ Grammar School in Stevenage and Basingstoke High School for Girls before reading Latin at the University of Reading in the early 1970s.

After a spell as a journalist in local radio in Manchester, she joined the staff of The Sunday Times in 1979 and stayed at the newspaper until 1984, although Smith still contributes book reviews, usually on crime fiction, to the publication. She has had a regular column in The Guardian's Weekend supplement, also freelancing for the newspaper and has contributed to The Independent, The Independent on Sunday, and the New Statesman.

In her non-fiction Smith displays a commitment to atheism, feminism (Misogynies: Reflections on Myths and Malice, 1989) and republicanism (Down with the Royals, 2015). She is scornful of popular culture and once gave away her television set to her ex-husband, although she acquired a new set almost a decade later.

On 15 September 2010, Smith, along with 54 other public figures, signed an open letter published in The Guardian, stating their opposition to Pope Benedict XVI's state visit to the UK.

In November 2011, she gave evidence to the Leveson Inquiry into press and media standards following the telephone hacking practised by the News of the World. She testified that she considered celebrities thought they could control press content if they put themselves into the public domain when, in reality the opposite was more likely.

Although Smith was opposed to the 2003 Invasion of Iraq, disputing the false claims about the Saddam Hussein regime's possession of Weapon of mass destruction, she took a different view during the Syrian civil war. As a consequence of the Syrian refugee crisis, and the 2013 Ghouta attacks using chemical weapons, she called for military intervention.

In 2013, the then Mayor of London, Boris Johnson appointed Smith as a co-chair of the city's Violence Against Women and Girls (VAWG) Board and she continued the role under his successor Sadiq Khan. In 2021, The Times reported on Smith's claim that she had been sacked from the position because of her views on women's rights in cases of single-sex rape, domestic abuse refuges and on reform of the Metropolitan Police and its “endemic misogyny” in the wake of the rape and murder of Sarah Everard by a serving police officer. A City Hall spokesperson said that Smith's post had been discontinued following a systemic review of the Mayor's Office for Policing and Crime (MOPAC)'s partnership boards including the VAWG board, adding that, "Joan Smith's expertise and insights on the VAWG board have been valuable and we are grateful for her time and service".

Outside the UK, Smith is probably best known for the Loretta Lawson series of crime novels which were published between 1987 and 1995. What Will Survive (2007) is a novel set in Lebanon in 1997 concerning a journalist's investigation into the death of a model and anti-landmine campaigner.

She is a keen supporter of Classics in state schools, describing the 1997–2010 Labour government's failure to act on the matter as "hardly their finest hour" and is a patron of The Iris Project. Smith is a supporter of the pressure group Republic and a Patron of Humanists UK. In 2015, she was elected chair of Labour Humanists, a group promoting secularist policies and humanist values within the Labour party. She is an honorary associate of the National Secular Society.

Joan Smith was appointed the Executive Director of Hacked Off in late May 2014 in succession to Brian Cathcart. Smith assumed the position in June, but stood down in late June 2015 to return to her writing career full-time.

She is due to publish an account of femicide in ancient Rome by the end of 2024.

== Personal life ==
Smith was married to journalist Francis Wheen between 1985 and 1993.

Following the end of her marriage, Smith started a relationship with Denis MacShane, a British Labour Party politician at the time. On 25 May 2009, during the expenses scandal of 2009 Smith wrote an article for The Guardian titled "I am sick of my country and this hysteria over MPs" objecting to the furore over MPs' expenses which she cited as an example of bullying in public life, stating that her (then) partner was an (unnamed) MP.

The couple subsequently split up in 2010 after seven years together; MacShane was subsequently sentenced to six months of imprisonment for submitting false invoices.

In 2003 she was offered the MBE for her services to PEN, but refused the award.

== Bibliography ==
=== Non-fiction ===
- Clouds of Deceit: Deadly Legacy of Britain's Bomb Tests. Faber. 1985. ISBN 0-571-13628-1.
- Misogynies: Reflections on Myths and Malice. Faber. 1989. ISBN 0-571-15451-4.
- Hungry for You: From Cannibalism to Seduction - A Book of Food. Chatto & Windus. 1996. ISBN 0-7011-6217-1.
- Different for Girls: How Culture Creates Women. Vintage. 1998. ISBN 0-09-959411-0.
- Moralities: How to End the Abuse of Money and Power in the 21st Century. Allen Lane. 2001. ISBN 0-7139-9409-6.
- Down With The Royals. Biteback Publishing. 2015. ISBN 9781849548298.
- Home Grown: How Domestic Violence Turns Men into Terrorists. riverrun. 2019. ISBN 978-1787476042.
- Unfortunately, She was a Nymphomaniac: A New History of Rome's Imperial Women. William Collins. 2024. ISBN 9780008638825.

=== Loretta Lawson novels ===
- A Masculine Ending. Faber. 1987. ISBN 0-571-14751-8.
- Why Aren't They Screaming?. Faber. 1988. ISBN 0-571-15187-6.
- Don't Leave ME This Way. Faber. 1990. ISBN 0-571-14102-1.
- What Men Say. Chatto & Windus. 1993. ISBN 0-7011-5793-3.
- Full Stop. Chatto and Windus. 1995. ISBN 0-7011-6000-4.

=== Novel ===
- What Will Survive. Arcadia Books. 2007. ISBN 978-1-905147-56-4.

=== Editor ===
- Femmes De Siècle. Chatto and Windus. 1992. ISBN 0-7011-3984-6.

== See also ==
- List of newspaper columnists
