= Wrong World =

1985 film by Ian Pringle

- Directed by: Ian Pringle
- Written by: Doug Ling; Ian Pringle
- Produced by: Bryce Menzies
- Starring: Richard Moir; Jo Kennedy; Nick Lathouris; Robbie McGregor; Esben Storm
- Cinematography: Ray Argall
- Edited by: Ray Argall
- Music by: Eric Gradman; Dave Cahill; Nick Rischbieth
- Release dates: February 1985 (Berlin International Film Festival); 3 April 1986 (Australia)
- Running time: 97 minutes
- Country: Australia
- Language: English
- Budget: A$600,000
- Box office: A$17,213 (Australia)

Wrong World is a 1985 Australian drama film directed by Ian Pringle and starring Richard Moir, Jo Kennedy, Nick Lathouris, Robbie McGregor, and Esben Storm. It was filmed in Nhill and Melbourne in Victoria, Australia, with additional scenes in La Paz, Bolivia and New York City.

== Plot ==
David (Richard Moir) is an Australian graduate doctor who has recently become disillusioned and depressed after working in a hospital in La Paz, Bolivia and then travelling through the United States. In both countries, he observes a sense of emotional detachment and ennui. He also picks up an addiction to morphine while in La Paz, stealing from the hospital's supplies. Returning to his hometown of Melbourne, he is financially supported by an old colleague named Robert (Robbie McGregor) who has found corporate success and feels guilty that he did not pursue a desire to "change the world" as David did. David enters rehab where he meets Mary (Jo Kennedy), a young woman with a heroin addiction, after he intervenes to stop heavy-handed clinic staff from preventing her from leaving. She is initially mistrusting of him but eventually their lives become intertwined, particularly after he saves her life following an overdose.

A drug deal gone wrong then sees her needing to leave Melbourne, so she decides to lay low at her sister's house in Nhill. Robert offers to drive her there and they set out together in a rented car. They share experiences and warm up to each other along the way, and both find that the other offers a counterpoint of hope to their world-weary bitterness. While spending a night in a cheap hotel room, they watch The Mortal Storm together though Mary has seen it before. An onset of bad reception leads Mary to describe what happens to David instead, which leads to them kissing for the first time then making love.

The next day, they continue towards Nhill and Mary sings "I'm So Lonesome I Could Cry", a song she says she learned from a Ray Charles record during childhood and had always related to. A rock bouncing off the tyre of a passing truck then shatters the car's windscreen. Shaken, they both consider driving further than Nhill but decide against it. David continues driving in the windshield-less car, as Mary attempts to keep warm. Arriving in Nhill, David tells Mary he intends to return to Melbourne and be a doctor again, and Mary tells David not to worry about her and that she will be alright. Settling in to her sister's house, Mary flicks through her sister's records and spends a moment in thought when she finds a copy of Ray Charles' Wish You Were Here Tonight. As David drives home to Melbourne with a repaired windscreen, he thinks back to her singing "I'm So Lonesome I Could Cry."

== Cast ==
- Richard Moir as David Trueman
- Jo Kennedy as Mary
- Nick Lathouris as Rangott
- Robbie McGregor as Robert
- Esben Storm as Lawrence
- Tim Robertson as Psychiatrist

== Production ==
The film was made for $600,000 with a grant of more than $100,000 from Film Victoria. Jo Kennedy was drawn to the project as it was completely different from her breakout role in Starstruck. To prepare for the role, she spent several weeks on the streets of Melbourne's "drug district" and as a result her weight dropped to 38 kilograms. She later told the media she had approached the role hoping to humanise drug users in the eyes of the viewing public:

People look at those kids and all they see is frenetic energy, drugs and a pretty disgusting lifestyle. I wanted to make sure people see that a girl like that is a real person, that she has the same feelings as, say, a business executive, but because of circumstances she's in a position which doesn't allow much consideration for those feelings... I didn't want people to say, 'Wow, isn't Jo Kennedy great?' I wanted them to say, 'Shit, that girl looks like she's getting a pretty unfair deal'.

The young woman on whom Kennedy based her performance died of an overdose during the film's production.

== Reception and awards ==
At the 1985 AFI Awards, Ray Argall was nominated in the Best Achievement in Cinematography category but Kennedy was not nominated for her performance. However, later that year, she won the Silver Bear for Best Actress at the 35th Berlin International Film Festival while Ian Pringle was nominated for a Golden Bear. Kennedy, who was not even aware she had been nominated, described a "backlash" among the Australian film industry in the aftermath of this award, telling The Sydney Morning Herald that "people (became) defensive... 'Here comes Jo Kennedy, big star. Show us what you can do.'" One Melbourne radio station called her early in the morning, asked her "bloody stupid things like 'Jo, are you in love?'", then published the resulting conversation as an "interview" in a magazine. She also mentioned that various people in the Canadian film industry told her she looked "ugly" in the film.

Pringle struggled to find a distributor in Australia. It was only in the aftermath of the film's international awards that he was able to distribute the film locally himself with a grant from the AFC. Wrong World ultimately grossed $17,213 at the box office in Australia. Producer Bryce Menzies commented that in his opinion, "if the voices were substituted... if it was an American or German film, people would (have flocked) to it."

== Home video release ==
Wrong World has never been released on VHS or DVD. It aired on Australian television for the first time one morning in January 1997 on the Nine Network at 2:40am. In the 2020s it became available on video on demand and streaming services, including Tubi in the US and Brollie in Australia.

== See also ==
- Cinema of Australia
