= Reg Evans =

British-born Australian actor (1928–2009)

- Born: Reginald Evans; 27 March 1928; London, England
- Died: 7 February 2009 (aged 80); St Andrews, Victoria, Australia
- Occupation: Actor
- Spouse: Jean Whitman (1956–1965)
- Partner: Angela Brunton (d. 2009)

Reginald Evans (27 March 1928 – 7 February 2009) was a British-born actor active in Australian radio, theatre, television and cinema from the 1960s, after having started his career in his native England.

== Early life ==
Evans started drama while in the Royal Air Force, stationed near Oxford, England. After leaving the RAF, he studied at the London Academy of Music and Dramatic Art, followed by work in repertory theatre. He toured Europe with the New Park Theatre Club and later became its artistic director.

Evans immigrated to Australia in the 1960s and worked in commercial radio and toured with the theatre company the Young Elizabethan Players.

== Career ==
Evans' many Australian television appearances include guest roles in Homicide, You Can't See 'Round Corners, Skippy the Bush Kangaroo, Number 96, Division 4, Spyforce, The Evil Touch, A Time for Love, Behind the Legend, The Comedy Game, and The Hour Before My Brother Dies.

In 1980, he featured in the Australian version of Are You Being Served?

Evans played several roles in Prisoner – a colleague at Eddie Cook's electrical firm (1979), the foreman at the printshop where inmate Bea Smith does her work release (1982), and Foxy, an old friend of Lizzie Birdsworth (1983), before taking the permanent role of Detective Howard Simmons in 1985.

He also appeared in the TV series Blue Heelers as Keith Purvis in the 1990s. In 2005, he returned to Blue Heelers in a smaller guest role.

Evans' film credits include Mad Dog Morgan (1976), the Station Master in Mad Max (1979), a pirate in The Island (1980), Manganinnie (1980), The Plains of Heaven (1982), Kitty and the Bagman (1983), Strikebound (1984), My Letter to George (1986) and Celia (1989). His final role was a part in film Charlie and Boots.

== Partial filmography ==
=== Film ===
- Journey Out of Darkness (1966) – Man in pub (uncredited)
- Stone (1974) – Solicitor
- Mad Dog Morgan (1976) – Bob
- Deathcheaters (1976) – Army Sergeant
- Raw Deal (1977) – Carpenter
- Mad Max (1979) – Station Master
- The Island (1980) – Jack the Bat
- Manganinnie (1980) – Quinn
- Gallipoli (1981) – Athletics Official 1
- The Plains of Heaven (1982) – Cunningham
- A Shifting Dreaming (1982, TV movie) – Dudley Playford Adamson
- Kitty and the Bagman (1983) – Chicka
- Strikebound (1984) – Ernie
- Mesmerised (1985) – Me Simmons
- My Letter to George (1985) – Mr. Simmons
- The Hour Before My Brother Dies (1986, TV movie) – Father
- 100% Wool (1986) – Charlie
- Evil Angels (1988) – The Jury (Foreman)
- Celia (1989) – Jack
- Father (1990) – Old Charlie
- Heaven Tonight (1990) – Norm Jenkins
- Flynn (a.k.a. My Forgotten Man) (1993) – Hobo
- The Echo of Thunder (1988, TV movie) – Garage Attendant
- Muggers (2000) – Crawford
- Pozieres (2000) – Billy Hughes
- Japanese Story (2003) – Bloke in Row Boat
- The Honourable Wally Norman (2003) – Barry
- Koala in the Kitchen (2005, TV movie)
- Dying Breed (2008) – Alfred
- Charlie & Boots (2009) – Mac (final film role)

=== Television ===
- Consider Your Verdict (1964, 1 episode) – John Bragge
- The Stranger (1964, miniseries, 1 episode) – Soshuniss citizen
- You Can't See 'Round Corners (1967, 3 episodes) – Ern McCauliffe
- Skippy the Bush Kangaroo (1968–70, 3 episodes) – Star / Frog / Fred
- Riptide (1969, 1 episode) – Assistant Manager
- Woobinda, Animal Doctor (1969, 1 episode) – Spencer
- The Rovers (1969, 1 episode) – Barney
- Homicide (1969–76, 7 episodes) – Leo Fowler / Willie Morris / George Jackson / Len Tucker / Brian Smith / John Evans / Charlie White
- Dynasty (1970, 1 episode) – Jim
- Spyforce (1971, 1 episode) – Prune
- The Comedy Game (1971, 1 episode) – Bus Driver 1
- A Time for Love (1972) – guest role
- Number 96 (1972–73, 3 episodes) – Mr Thorburn / Laundry Manager
- Division 4 (1969–73, 4 episodes) – Merv Lacey / Joe Smith / Lesley Fisher
- Behind the Legend (1972, 1975) – C.J. Dennis / John Shaw Nielson at 40
- The Evil Touch (1973, 1 episode) – Ralphie
- And the Big Men Fly (1974, 6 episodes) – Wally Sloss
- Scattergood: Friend of All (1975, 2 episodes)
- Matlock Police (1975–76, 2 episodes) – George 'Peg Leg' Jackson / Barney Sloane
- Tandarra (1976, miniseries, 1 episode) – Tom Evans
- Power Without Glory (1976, miniseries, 3 episodes) – Bob Standish
- Bluey (1977, 1 episode) – Wally 'Birds' Avery
- The Sullivans (1977–78, 3 episodes) – Mr Patterson
- Skyways (1979, 1 episode) – Errol Foote
- Cop Shop (1979–81, 4 episodes) – Percy Sutherland / Spud Brayshaw
- Prisoner (1979, 1982, 1983) – Electrician / Fred / Mick 'Foxy' Lawson
- Are You Being Served? (1980–81, 15 episodes) – Mr Cocker
- And Here Comes Bucknuckle (1981, 6 episodes) – Wally Sloss
- I Can Jump Puddles (1981, miniseries, 1 episode) – Bluey
- Holiday Island (1981, 1 episode) – George Wilmott
- Women of the Sun (1982, miniseries, 1 episode) – Stuckey
- Five Mile Creek (1983, 1 episode) – Fred Finnegan
- Carson's Law (1983–84, 3 episodes) – Fred Cassidy / Matty
- Eureka Stockade (1984, miniseries, 2 episodes) – Goodenough
- A Country Practice (1985, 2 episodes) – Ted Marshall
- Anzacs (1985, miniseries, 1 episode) – General Birdwood
- Prisoner (1985) – Detective Howard Simmons
- The Fast Lane (1986, 1 episode) – Dr Chisholm
- The Shiralee (1987, miniseries, 2 episodes) – Luke
- Pugwall (1989, 1 episode) – Henry
- Mission: Impossible (1989, 1 episode) – Jules Ashton
- All the Rivers Run II (1990, miniseries, 1 episode) – Specs
- Skirts (1990, 1 episode) – Fish
- Boys from the Bush (1991, 1 episode) – Stewie
- Ratbag Hero (1991, miniseries) – Cocky Brown
- The Flying Doctors (1991, 1 episode) – Fitzy
- The River Kings (1991, miniseries, 2 episodes) – Mallee Ned
- Stark (1993, 1 episode) – Marina Keeper
- Wedlocked (1994, 1 episode) – Norman
- Snowy River: The McGregor Saga (1994–95, 16 episodes) – Jack Kelly
- Blue Heelers (1995) – Keith Purvis
- The Genie from Down Under (1996, 1 episode) – Army Tourist
- SeaChange (1999, 1 episode) – Lewis Murphy
- Something in the Air (2000, 3 episodes) – Albert
- Short Cuts (2002, 1 episode) – Mr Barlow
- Welcher and Welcher (2003, 1 episode) – Freddie the Forger
- MDA (2003, 2 episodes) – Bob Whitecross
- Blue Heelers (2005) – SpongeBob

== Death ==
Evans and his partner, Angela Brunton, died in the 2009 Black Saturday bushfires.
