= List of films set in Sydney =

The following is a partial list of films set in Sydney.

== 1910s ==
- The Sentimental Bloke (1919)

== 1920s ==
- The Kid Stakes (1927)

== 1930s ==
- The Cheaters (1930)

== 1940s ==
- Under Capricorn (1949)

== 1950s ==
- Kangaroo (1952)
- Summer of the Seventeenth Doll (1959)

== 1960s ==
- They're a Weird Mob (1966)

== 1970s ==
- Stone (1974)
- Caddie (1976)
- The FJ Holden (1977)
- The Night the Prowler (1978)

== 1980s ==
- Puberty Blues (1981)
- Winter of Our Dreams (1981)
- Dead Easy (1982)
- Heatwave (1982)
- Starstruck (1982)
- BMX Bandits (1983)
- One Night Stand
- Bliss (1985)
- Around the World in Eighty Ways (1987)
- Emerald City (1988)

== 1990s ==
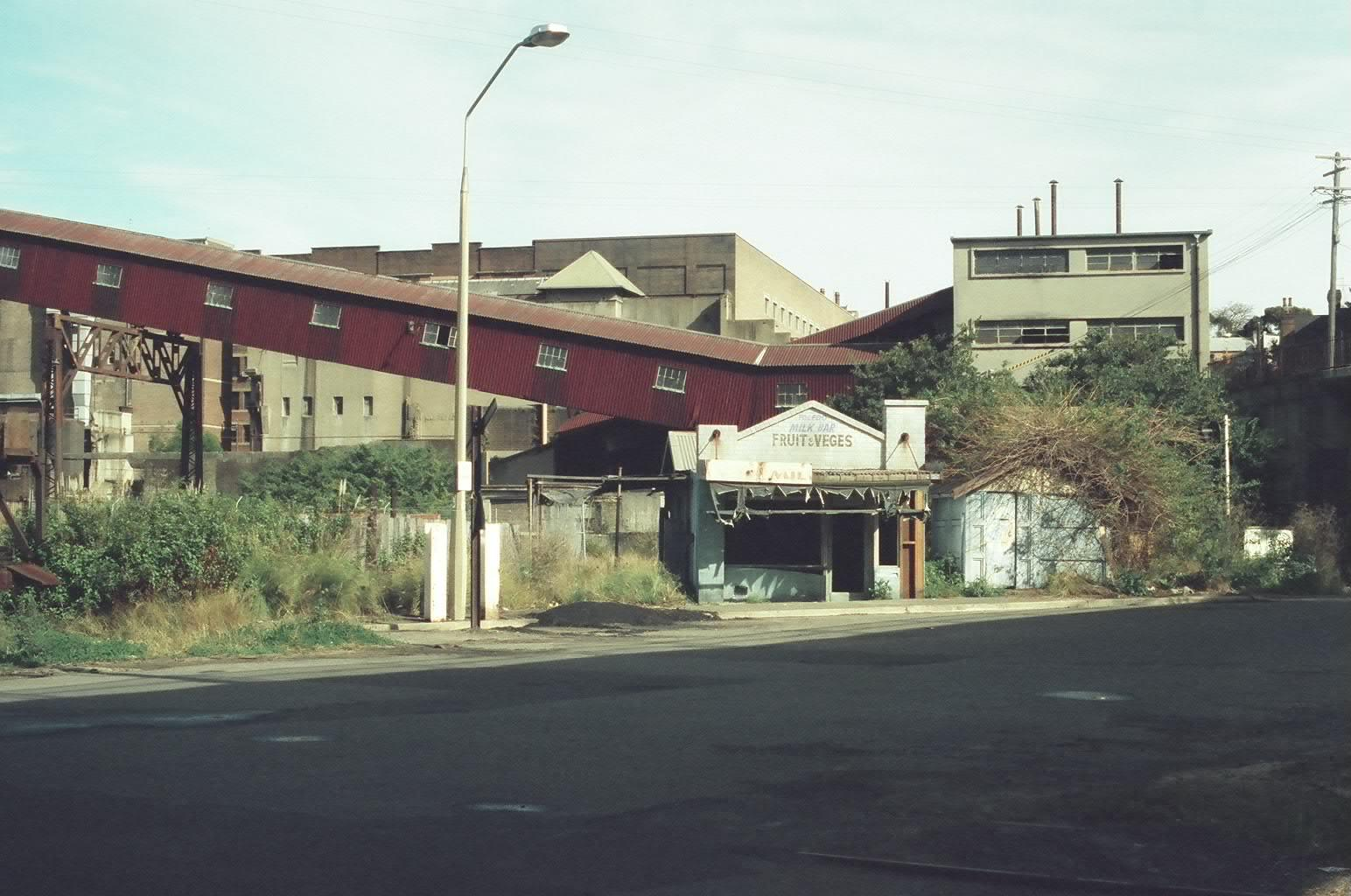
Strictly Ballroom film set used for Fran's family business and residence. (site since redeveloped, approx. to the Star City Casino complex, Pyrmont)

- The Rescuers Down Under (1990)
- Strictly Ballroom (1992)
- The Adventures of Priscilla, Queen of the Desert (1994)
- Muriel's Wedding (1994)
- The Sum of Us (1994)
- Napoleon (1995)
- Dating the Enemy (1996)
- The Boys (1998)
- Strange Planet (1999)
- Erskineville Kings (1999)
- Two Hands (1999)

== 2000s ==
- Looking for Alibrandi (2000)
- Mission: Impossible 2 (2000)
- Our Lips Are Sealed (2000)
- Lantana (2001)
- He Died with a Felafel in His Hand (2001)
- Dil Chahta Hai (2001)
- Dirty Deeds (2002)
- Garage Days (2002)
- Scooby-Doo! and the Legend of the Vampire (2002)
- Finding Nemo (2003)
- Godzilla: Final Wars (2004)
- Little Fish (2005)
- Salaam Namaste (2005)
- Footy Legends (2006)
- Heyy Babyy (2007)
- The Tender Hook (2008)
- The Combination (2009)
- Cedar Boys (2009)

== 2010s ==
- Inception (2010)
- The Eye of the Storm (2011)
- Around the Block (2012)
- Nerve (2013)
- Manny Lewis (2015)
- Ruben Guthrie (2015)
- Down Under (2016)
- Surat Kecil untuk Tuhan (2017)
- Ladies in Black (2018)
- Palm Beach (2019)

== 2020s ==
- 6 Festivals (2022)
- Anyone But You (2023)
- Birdeater (2023)
- Christmess (2023)
- The Fall Guy (2024)
- How to Make Gravy (2024)
- Nugget Is Dead?: A Christmas Story (2024)
- Hindi Vindi (2025)
- Kangaroo (2025)
