= Waiting at the Royal =

- Directed by: Glenda Hambly
- Written by: Glenda Hambly
- Produced by: Richard Keddie; Andrew Wiseman
- Starring: Catherine McClements; Noni Hazlehurst; Josephine Byrnes
- Release date: 2000
- Running time: 96 minutes
- Country: Australia
- Language: English

Waiting at the Royal is a 2000 Australian drama film directed by Glenda Hambly and starring Catherine McClements, Noni Hazlehurst, Josephine Byrnes and Jo Kennedy.

== Cast ==
- Catherine McClements as Dinny Weston
- Noni Hazelhurst as Eloise
- Josephine Byrnes as Antoinette
- Jo Kennedy as Diana
- Ramon Tikaram as Saresh
- Glynis Angell as Josie
- Luke Elliot as Noel
- Terry Norris as Diana's father

== Synopsis ==
Four diverse women experiencing difficult pregnancies go into a maternity ward, and emerge after forming unexpected bonds, as they navigate personal struggles and await childbirth.

== Production ==
The series was produced by Apollo Films.

== Festivals ==
The series screened at the Boston International Festival of Women's Cinema and the Banff World Television Festival in 2001.

== Awards ==
Year	Award	Category	Result	Ref.
2000	Australian Film Institute Awards	Best Miniseries or Telefeature	Nominated	
2000	Australian Film Institute Awards	Best Direction in a Television Drama	Nominated	
2000	Australian Film Institute Awards	Best Performance by an Actress in a Leading Role in a Telefeature or Miniseries (Noni Hazlehurst)	Won	
2000	Australian Film Institute Awards	Best Performance by an Actress in a Leading Role in a Telefeature or Miniseries (Jo Kennedy)	Nominated	
2001	Logie Awards	Most Outstanding Telemovie / Miniseries	Nominated	
2001	AWGIE Awards	Telemovie Original	Nominated	
2001	BANFF Television Festival	Rockie Award for Best Made-for-TV Movie	Won	
