= Rod Moss =

Australian painter and writer (born 1948)

Rod Moss (born April 1948) is an Australian painter and writer.

== Life ==
Moss was born in Ferntree Gully, April 1948 and completed both primary and secondary schooling in Boronia before gaining Secondary Art Teaching credentials and serving the Victorian Education Department until 1979. He was invited by the Royden Irvine to teach in one of the experimental schools that emerged in Melbourne during the early 1970s: Brinsley Road, East Camberwell. The school endured several relocations and ideological shifts as it journeyed on to Argo Street Prahran and lastly, Fitzroy Street, St Kilda. At the end of the decade, Moss left for a year to go to West Virginia where a school had been established by John G Bennett following guidelines inspired by the teachings of George Gurdjieff. Soon after returning to Australia, Moss relocated to Central Australia where he's lived permanently since 1984. He lectured in painting and drawing at the Alice Springs TAFE campus, (now Charles Darwin University) until retiring in 2008. He lives in Alice Springs and visits his three children who are dotted around Australia's eastern seaboard. Writing and painting continue.

== Painting and writing ==
Having concluded forty years of teaching, Moss continues to write and paint, activities he's maintained commitment to throughout the decades. His first one-man exhibition was at the Hawthorn City Galleries in 1979, and he's continued to exhibit in Australia and the United States regularly, with the support of Fireworks Gallery in Brisbane and Anna Pappas Gallery in Melbourne. In 2004 he was invited to the Contemporary Australian Art survey at the Ian Potter Gallery, Melbourne.

He has collected extensive imagery that focuses on the work he's undertaken with Arrernte families since moving to Alice Springs, in Central Australia. Here you will also find an extensive list of awards, publications and exhibitions he's participated in. Numbering among the books are Traudi Allen's, Homesickness, Charles Green's Peripheral Visions, Daena Murray's Hotsprings and Terry Smith's Contemporary Art; World Visions.

He has written two published memoirs, both of which have won the Chief Minister's NT Book Of The Year Award (Territory Read). The first, The Hard Light of Day, also won the 2011 Prime Minister's Award for non-fiction. Excerpts from these books have appeared in UTS, Arena, Overland, Meanjin and The Alice Springs News.

Moss has been the recipient of painting residencies at Columbus State University, Georgia, and Broken Hill. He was also an invited speaker at Melbourne Writers Festival, Byron Bay, Darwin, Brisbane and Auckland.

== Work in public collections ==
- Kluge Ruhe, Virginia, USA
- Columbus State University, Georgia
- The Howard Black Collection, Sydney University Union
- Northern Territory Museum of Arts & Sciences, Darwin
- Alice Art Foundation, The Araluen Centre, Alice Springs
- Artbank, Sydney
- BHP Billinton, Melbourne
- City Lending Library, Melbourne
- Melbourne State Library
- Charles Darwin University
- Q.L.D Art Gallery
- Maree Plains Regional Art Gallery
- Prospect Council Chambers, Adelaide
- Broken Hill Regional Art Gallery
- University of Wollongong
- University of Queensland
