= Smoke 'Em If You Got 'Em (film) =

- Directed by: Ray Boseley
- Written by: Ray Boseley
- Starring: Nique Needles
- Release date: 1988
- Running time: 48 minutes
- Country: Australia
- Language: English

Smoke 'Em If You Got 'Em is a 1988 Australian short feature about an underground party held in post-apocalyptic Melbourne. The film is a product of nuclear anxiety at the height of the Cold War, and is considered a cult classic today.

== Premise ==
The city of Melbourne is destroyed in a nuclear strike. In the suburb of Elwood, three survivors chance upon the entrance to a fallout shelter. To their surprise, they are invited in by a large group of people somehow throwing a wild underground party with live rock bands and a massive supply of alcohol. Knowing they have days or hours to live, all are determined to see out the end of the world in the most decadent manner possible. The film leaves it ambiguous as to whether the events depicted are reality or a hallucination.

== Cast ==
- Nique Needles
- Rob Howard
- Fred Dugina
- Danny Lillford
- Clayton Jacobson

== Production ==
The film originated as a film school project at Swinburne from Ray Boseley. It was funded from a grant by the Independent Filmmakers' Fund at Film Victoria and the Creative Development Branch of the Australian Film Commission.

== Release ==
The film was released in 1988. In May 2020 the film screened at Monster Fest in Australia.

== Reception ==
Reviewing the DVD re-release The Curb wrote "When the rest of the world was making Threads, Miracle Mile and The Day After, Australia was busy making Smoke ‘Em If You’ve Got ‘Em. Writer/director Ray Boseley plugs in the amp, loads up the bong, and turns off the lights for the party to end all parties as he brings the nuclear apocalypse to the Elwood, Melbourne. This 1988 raucous punk affair runs for a brisk 48 minutes, making good on the promise that once the bombs hit, you don’t have long to live, so you best have one heck of a time while you’re going out. "

According to the Oz Movies website, the film is "certainly more fun than watching other Australian post-apocalyptic movies, such as John Duigan's dull, well-meaning One Night Stand, or the wretched On the Beach, which shares Melbourne as a location, but in the Stanley Kramer way offers not a shred of nihilistic, anarchistic, Swinburnian Melburnian humour."
