= List of Archibald Prize 2018 finalists =

This is a list of finalists for the 2018 Archibald Prize for portraiture, listed is Artist – Title. (As the images are copyright, an external link to an image has been listed where available.)

- Benjamin Aitken – Natasha (Portrait of Natasha Bieniek – Image)
- Del Kathryn Barton – Self-portrait with studio wife
- Jason Benjamin – So you want to come down and the silence of painting (self-portrait)
- Peter Berner – Self-portrait with hindsight
- Amber Boardman – Self-care exhaustion
- Joanna Braithwaite – Hall of fame – portrait of Pat Corrigan
- Jun Chen – Judith Bell
- Yvette Coppersmith – Self-portrait, after George Lambert Winner: Archibald Prize 2018
- Tony Costa – Claudia Chan Shaw
- Jonathan Dalton – Abdul
- David Darcy – Charlotte
- Amanda Davies – Self-portrait
- Blak Douglas – Uncle Roy Kennedy
- Graeme Drendel – Portrait of Michel
- Yvonne East – The Honourable Chief Justice Susan Kiefel AC
- Marc Etherington – Me and Granny
- Marina Finlay – Peter, Coco and Susan O'Doherty
- Prudence Flint – Double
- Andrew Lloyd Greensmith – The serenity of Susan Carland
- David Griggs – The warrior and the prophet
- Melissa Grisancich – Courtney Barnett and her weapon of choice
- Robert Hannaford – Robert Hannaford self-portrait
- Tsering Hannaford – Self-portrait
- Nicholas Harding – Treatment, day 49 (sorbolene soak)
- Amani Haydar – Insert headline here
- Pei Pei He – Portrait of Theodore Wohng
- Paul Jackson – Alison Whyte, a mother of the renaissance
- Kathrin Longhurst – Self: past, present and future
- Mathew Lynn – Gladys Berejiklian
- Alison Mackay – Quid pro quo (portrait of photographer Gary Grealy)
- William Mackinnon – The long apprenticeship
- Euan Macleod – Guy at Jamberoo
- Guy Maestri – The fourth week of parenthood (self-portrait)
- Robert Malherbe – Michael Reid
- India Mark – Candy
- Fiona McMonagle – Sangeeta Sandrasegar
- Julian Meagher – Herb and Flan
- Anne Middleton – Guy (Winner: People's Choice Award 2018)
- Stephanie Monteith – The letter – I really wanted to paint Germaine Greer, but she said 'no' (self-portrait)
- Vincent Namatjira – Studio self-portrait
- Kirsty Neilson – Anxiety still at 30
- Tom Polo – I once thought I'd do anything for you (Joan)
- James Powditch – Narcissist, the anatomy of melancholy
- Jamie Preisz – Jimmy (title fight) Winner: Packing Room Prize 2018
- Jordan Richardson – David Wenham and hat
- Sally Ross – The Huxleys
- Dee Smart – Lunch in the outback
- Ben Smith – Tony
- Loribelle Spirovski – Villains always get the best lines
- Vanessa Stockard – Self-portrait
- Noel Thurgate – Elisabeth Cummings in her studio at Wedderburn, 1974 and 2018
- Angela Tiatia – Study for a self-portrait
- Natasha Walsh – Numb to touch (self-portrait)
- Mirra Whale – Don
- Marcus Wills – Lotte (Portrait of Lotte St Clair)
- Karyn Zamel – Marina Finlay
- Salvatore Zofrea – Sally Dowling SC

== See also ==
- Previous year: List of Archibald Prize 2017 finalists
- Next year: List of Archibald Prize 2019 finalists
- List of Archibald Prize winners
