= Yvette Coppersmith =

Australian painter (born 1980)

- Born: 1980 (age 45–46); Melbourne, Victoria, Australia
- Education: Victorian College of the Arts
- Known for: Portraiture and still life painting
- Awards: Archibald Prize; 2018 Self-portrait, after George Lambert – Artist
- Website: www.yvettecoppersmith.com

Yvette Coppersmith (born 1980) is an Australian painter; she specialises in portraiture and still life. In 2018 she won the Archibald Prize with a self-portrait, in the style of George Lambert.

Coppersmith studied at the Victorian College of the Arts in Melbourne, Australia. In 2003 she was the inaugural winner of the Metro 5 Art Prize and she has been a finalist a further four times (in 2004, 2005, 2006 and 2021). She has been a finalist four times (in 2003, 2007, 2008 and 2016) in the Portia Geach Memorial Award. She has been a finalist in the Doug Moran National Portrait Prize four times (in 2002, 2006, 2007 and 2016). She was a finalist in the Archibald Prize four times (in 2008, 2009, 2016 and 2017) before winning in 2018 .

In 2018 Coppersmith approached New Zealand Prime Minister Jacinda Ardern to sit for a portrait with her, however Ardern was unavailable. Coppersmith instead painted a self-portrait inspired by Ardern, which won the competition. Her other portraits have included paintings of Rupert Myer, Rosemary Balmford, Gillian Triggs and John Safran.

Coppersmith's works are held in several public and private collections, including the Jewish Museum of Australia; Benalla Art Gallery; the Supreme Court of Victoria; Trinity College, The University of Melbourne and the University of Technology Sydney. Coppersmith also teaches drawing and painting and has held workshops at the National Gallery of Victoria, Geelong Grammar School, and The Art Room.

Awards
Preceded by Mitch Cairns	Archibald Prize; 2018 for Yvette Coppersmith	Succeeded by Tony Costa
