= Ian Pringle (director) =

Australian film director

- Occupation(s): Film director, producer, screenwriter
- Notable work: Romper Stomper, The Plains of Heaven

Ian Pringle is an Australian film director, producer and screenwriter.

== Career ==
Pringle's first feature film was The Plains of Heaven (1982). The follow-up Wrong World was nominated for the Golden Bear at the 35th Berlin International Film Festival in 1985, and won the Silver Bear for lead actress Jo Kennedy.

His film The Prisoner of St. Petersburg was screened in the Un Certain Regard section at the 1989 Cannes Film Festival. In 1991 he directed the French-Australian co-production Isabelle Eberhardt, starring Peter O'Toole and Mathilda May. Other film work includes co-producing the controversial neo-Nazi drama Romper Stomper.

As of 2012 Pringle continues to work as a script consultant, lecturer and writer. After a 22-year absence he returned to writing and directing with his 2014 Australian feature film The Legend Maker, which premiered at the 2014 Melbourne International Film Festival.

== Picasso robbery incident ==
In 1994, Pringle was living in New York with girlfriend Barbara Joslyn, who worked as a romance writer. Joslyn confessed to a friend named Crawford Greenleaf (whom she had apparently once "lavished gifts on") that she was "broke and suicidal", to which he replied unsympathetically. She then began concocting a scheme to rob Greenleaf's apartment and steal an original sketch by Pablo Picasso. Pringle volunteered to commit the robbery, later telling The Age that he did so because "it was a period when I was idle, and that wasn’t good for me... I met somebody who needed some help and I tried to help them.” Joslyn arranged a lunch date with Greenleaf then deliberately left the door ajar, allowing Pringle to slip in, cut the Picasso from the frame and make off with it along with other valuables. Both Joslyn and Pringle were charged with robbery after Joslyn confessed only hours later. Pringle was caught and served six months at Rikers Island. Joslyn fled New York and was finally arrested in 1997, repeatedly stabbing herself when police began knocking on her door. Pringle returned to Australia and moved on with his life, telling an interviewer in 2014 that he was "happy to talk about it, but thoroughly sick of it."

== Select credits ==
=== Features ===
- The Plains of Heaven (1982) - director, writer
- Wrong World (1985) - director, writer
- The Tale of Ruby Rose (1989) - associate producer
- Celia (1989) - associate producer
- The Prisoner of St Petersburg (1989) - director, writer
- Isabelle Eberhardt (1991) - director, producer
- Romper Stomper (1992) - producer
- The Legend Maker (2014) - director, writer, producer

=== Shorts ===
- Flights (1977) - director, writer
- The Cartographer and the Waiter (1977) - director, writer
- Wronsky (1979) - director, producer, writer
- Songlines - Segment: "Romeos" (1989) - director
- Lover Boy (1989) - associate producer - short feature

=== Documentaries ===
- Bare Is His Back Who Has No Brother (1979) - director
- Desiderius Orban (1981) - director
- Islomania - (1985) - director, writer
