= The Old Wives' Tale =

1908 novel by Arnold Bennett

- Title page of the 1917 Thomas Nelson and Sons edition
- Author: Arnold Bennett
- Language: English
- Genre: Social novel
- Set in: Staffordshire and Paris, 1840–1905
- Publisher: Chapman and Hall
- Publication date: January 1908
- Publication place: United Kingdom
- Media type: Print: hardback
- Dewey Decimal: 823.912
- LC Class: PR6003 .E6 .O4
- Text: The Old Wives' Tale at Wikisource

The Old Wives' Tale: A Novel of Life is a novel by Arnold Bennett, first published in January 1908. It deals with the lives of two very different sisters, Constance and Sophia Baines, following their stories from their youth, working in their parents' Staffordshire draper's shop, into old age. It covers a period of approximately 65 years roughly from 1840 to 1905, and is set in Bursley (modeled on Burslem) and Paris. It is generally regarded as one of Bennett's finest works.

== Synopsis ==
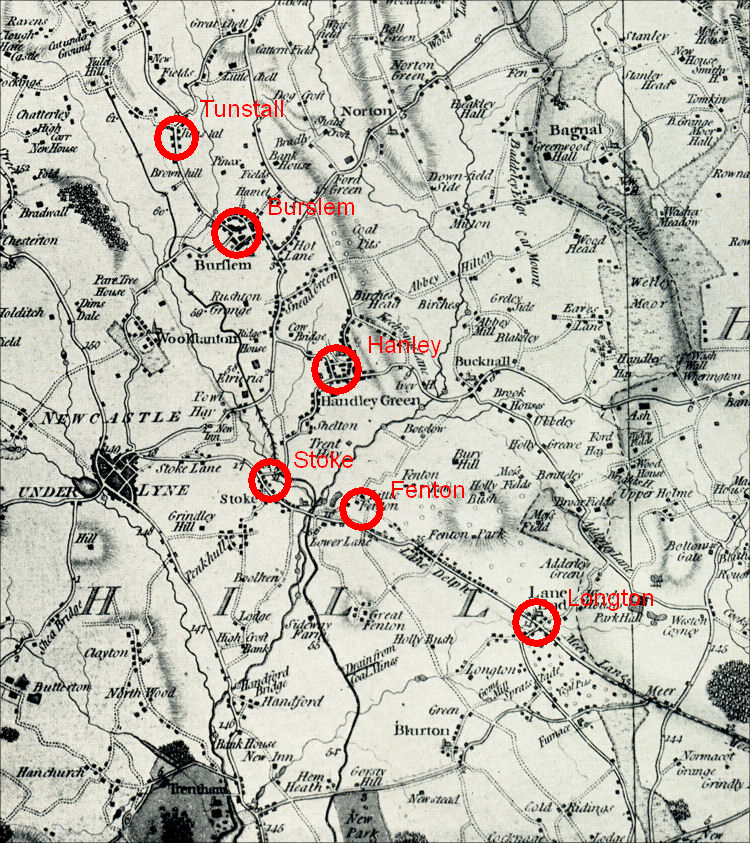
Much of the book is set in "Bursley," one of the "Five Towns" of the Staffordshire Potteries, a thinly veiled fictionalisation of Burslem, one of the "Six Towns" (circled on map) that form Stoke-on-Trent.

The book is divided into four parts. The first section, "Mrs Baines", details the adolescence of both Sophia and Constance, and their life in their father's shop and house (a combined property) in Bursley, a lightly dramatised version of Burslem. The father is ill and bedridden, and the main adult in their life is Mrs Baines, their mother.

By the end of the first book, the more adventurous and frivolous sister, Sophia (whose name reflects her sophistication, as opposed to the constant Constance), escapes Bursley to London and elopes with the travelling salesman, Gerald Scales, against her family’s wishes. Sophia and her husband alight to Paris and she leaves her family behind, ashamed that the money she used to find her freedom was stolen from her wealthy aunt. Constance meanwhile becomes engaged to Mr. Samuel Povey, who works in the shop.

The second part, "Constance", details the life of Constance from that point forward up until the time she is reunited with her sister in old age. Her life, although outwardly prosaic, is nevertheless filled with personal incident, including the birth of her son, Cyril; the execution of her brother-in-law, Daniel Povey, who had accidentally killed his alcoholic wife; and the subsequent death of her husband, Samuel, whose health fell into rapid disrepair after his brother’s conviction; and her concerns about the character and behaviour of her son, who nevertheless performs well enough at school to win a competitive and coveted scholarship, which takes him away from home.

The third part, "Sophia", carries forward the story of what happened to Sophia after her elopement. For a time, the couple live off her husband's £12,000 inheritance, but Gerald irresponsibly squanders the sum over a couple of years, then runs off. Abandoned by her husband in Paris, Sophia shrewdly survives the Siege of Paris and the Paris Commune using a small sum of money she stole from Gerald to run a boarding house. She eventually becomes the reputable owner of a successful pension.

The final part, "What Life Is", details how the two sisters are eventually reunited and reflects upon how their lives and fates, despite the vast difference in their demeanor, end up in the same town that had connected them from birth, even as the very character of the town changes underneath them. Sophia returns to England and the house of her childhood, where Constance has never left. The last part follows both sisters until their deaths, with Constance’s death coming after she mustered her last physical strength to vote against the federation of Bursley and the Five Towns into a combined city, with deleterious effects on Bursley’s aged city center. The vote fails, a seeming victory for Constance, who passes away. After her death, a loophole is discovered that invalidates the vote, and Bursley is federated with its neighboring cities.

== Origin ==
Bennett was initially inspired to write the book by a chance encounter in a Parisian restaurant. In the introduction to the book, he says

...an old woman came into the restaurant to dine. She was fat, shapeless, ugly, and grotesque. She had a ridiculous voice, and ridiculous gestures. It was easy to see that she lived alone, and that in the long lapse of years she had developed the kind of peculiarity which induces guffaws among the thoughtless.

and

I reflected, concerning the grotesque diner: "This woman was once young, slim, perhaps beautiful; certainly free from these ridiculous mannerisms. Very probably she is unconscious of her singularities. Her case is a tragedy. One ought to be able to make a heartrending novel out of the history of a woman such as she." Every stout, ageing woman is not grotesque—far from it!—but there is an extreme pathos in the mere fact that every stout ageing woman was once a young girl with the unique charm of youth in her form and movements and in her mind. And the fact that the change from the young girl to the stout ageing woman is made up of an infinite number of infinitesimal changes, each unperceived by her, only intensifies the pathos.

== Details and legacy ==
According to Tom Wolfe (Hooking Up, p. 148), the book was "wildly successful," with the author demurring with "I don't read my reviews, I measure them."

In 1998, the Modern Library ranked The Old Wives' Tale No. 87 on its list of the 100 best English-language novels of the 20th century.

The original manuscript is in the Lilly Library, Indiana.

It was adapted into a 1921 film The Old Wives' Tale starring Fay Compton. It was made into a TV series by the BBC in 1988 as Sophia and Constance.

In his 2026 work A History of the Novel in Britain, Philip Hensher argues that The Old Wives' Tale “ought to be acknowledged among the 20 greatest novels in English” and that it is "a miracle of human sympathy … but a miracle too, of technical command."
