= Return Home =

- Directed by: Ray Argall
- Written by: Ray Argall
- Produced by: Cristina Pozzan
- Starring: Dennis Coard; Frankie J. Holden; Ben Mendelsohn
- Cinematography: Mandy Walker
- Edited by: Ken Sallows
- Release dates: 2 August 1990 (Australia); 3 August 1990 (United States)
- Running time: 87 minutes
- Country: Australia
- Language: English
- Budget: A$350,000
- Box office: A$236,252

Return Home is a 1990 Australian drama film directed by Ray Argall. Argall won the AFI Award for Best Director in 1990 and Frankie J. Holden was nominated for Best Actor in a Lead Role.

== Plot ==
Noel McKenzie is a successful but divorced insurance broker in Melbourne. He returns briefly to hometown Adelaide where his brother Steve operates a traditional service station and workshop. Steve has a happy family life but is struggling to compete with more modern gas stations with convenience stores and self-service bowsers. Over time the brothers reconcile to each other’s life choices and recognise value in the family life they had in the suburb they grew up in.

== Cast ==
- Dennis Coard as Noel
- Frankie J. Holden as Steve
- Ben Mendelsohn as Gary
- Mickey Camilleri as Judy
- Rachel Rains as Wendy
- Gypsy Lukewood as Clare
- Ryan Rawlings as Wally
- Paul Nestor as Brian
- Alan Fletcher as Barry

Joe Camilleri appears as a busking friend of Noel.

== Production ==
The film was funded by the Australian Film Commission and Film Victoria with no private investment. It was shot in Adelaide over six weeks in February–March 1989 on 16mm but the AFC agreed to blow it up to 35mm.

Argall and the cast rehearsed for four weeks prior to filming. He said he worked on the script for seven years prior to the shoot.

== Box office ==
Return Home grossed $236,252 at the box office in Australia.

== See also ==
- Cinema of Australia
