= The Prisoner of St. Petersburg =

1989 film

- Directed by: Ian Pringle
- Written by: Michael Wren
- Produced by: Daniel Scharf; Klaus Sungen
- Starring: Solveig Dommartin
- Cinematography: Ray Argall
- Edited by: Ursula West
- Release date: 1989
- Running time: 78 minutes
- Countries: Australia; West Germany
- Language: English
- Budget: A$330,000

The Prisoner of St. Petersburg is a 1989 Australian drama film directed by Ian Pringle. It was screened in the Un Certain Regard section at the 1989 Cannes Film Festival.

The film was the first Australian-West German co-production. It was shot over 22 days in Germany. David Stratton wrote that the film "appeared to be commercially doomed from the beginning".

== Cast ==
- Efrem Accurso as Italian truck driver
- Ifrim Bender as Russian man with coat
- Solveig Dommartin as Elena
- Johanna Karl-Lory as Old woman
- Lars Michalak as Russian man behind door
- Michael Obinja as Russian man on train
- Pat O'Connell as Singing Irish man
- Olivier Picot as Stefan
- René Schönenberger as Businessman
- Wieland Speck as Youth in bar
- Denis Staunton as Irish man
- Hans Martin Stier as Truck driver
- Noah Taylor as Jack
- Katja Teichmann as Johanna
- Ralph Wittgrebe as German drunk
- Christian Zertz as Lorenzo
