= Sophia and Constance =

British drama television series

Sophia and Constance is a British drama television series that originally aired on the BBC in six episodes from 13 April to 18 May 1988. It was an adaptation of the 1908 novel The Old Wives' Tale by Arnold Bennett, which follows the lives of two sisters through the Victorian era.

== Cast ==
Alfred Burke (Mr Critchlow), Lynsey Beauchamp (Constance as a young woman) episodes 2, 3 and 5, Nigel Bradshaw (Samuel Povey) episodes 1, 2, 3 and 5, Katy Behean (Sophia as a young woman) episodes 2 to 4, Freda Dowie (Miss Insull), Patricia Routledge (Mrs Baines) episodes 1 to 3, Phyllis Calvert (Constance as an old woman) episode 6, Helen Cherry (Sophia as an old woman) episode 6, Beryl Reid (Madame Foucault) episode 4, Philip Childs (Cyril Povey)
