= Starstruck (1982 film) =

- Directed by: Gillian Armstrong
- Written by: Stephen MacLean
- Produced by: Richard Brennan; David Elfick
- Starring: Jo Kennedy; Ross O'Donovan; Margo Lee
- Production companies: Australian Film Commission; Palm Beach Pictures
- Distributed by: Hoyts Distribution
- Release date: 11 September 1982 (Canada)
- Running time: 105 minutes
- Country: Australia
- Language: English
- Budget: A$270,000 (est.)
- Box office: AU $1,541,000 (Australia)

Starstruck is a 1982 Australian comedy-drama musical film directed by Gillian Armstrong and starring Jo Kennedy, Ross O'Donovan and Margo Lee. The plot concerns two teenagers trying to break into the music industry. The film was shot on location in Sydney, New South Wales, Australia. It was marketed with the tagline "A Comedy Musical." The hotel shots were filmed at the Harbour View Hotel in The Rocks, near the south pylon of the Sydney Harbour Bridge.

== Plot ==
Sydney teenager Jackie Mullens works as a barmaid in her mother's pub and dreams of becoming a singing star, though she jokingly worries her dreams may be cut short by a nuclear holocaust. Her scheming 14-year-old cousin Angus aspires to be her manager. At a local club talent night, Jackie's performance impresses pop band The Wombats, who become her backing band. Jackie also begins dating the band's guitarist, Robbie.

In an attempt to get Jackie on a TV talent show, "The Wow! Show", Angus calls up the show's host, Terry Lambert, and tells him Jackie will be walking a tightrope between high-rise buildings, nude. Although the stunt backfires, Terry is intrigued enough to feature Jackie on the show. Jackie develops a crush on the suave Terry, and under his influence, she drops the Wombats from her act, tones down her quirky style of music and dress to be more conventional, and breaks up with Robbie who disapproves of these changes. Jackie's TV appearance with her new look and sound is a failure, and afterwards she discovers that Terry, who she thought was romantically interested in her, is actually gay. Humiliated, she reconciles with Robbie. Meanwhile, Angus' deadbeat father Lou has returned and begun romancing Jackie's hardworking mother Pearl, but the affair ends badly when Lou disappears with all the money from the pub's safe, leaving Pearl and the pub, which was already on the verge of closing, in dire financial straits.

In order to save both the pub and Jackie's singing career, Angus comes up with a plan for Jackie and the Wombats to crash The Wow! Show's New Year's Eve talent competition at the Sydney Opera House by posing as stage crew and then taking over the stage. The plan works and Jackie wins the $25,000 prize, thus becoming a star and saving the pub. The film ends with the sound of a firework exploding before a cut to black.

== Cast (in credits order) ==
- Jo Kennedy as Jackie
- Ross O'Donovan as Angus
- Margo Lee as Pearl
- Max Cullen as Reg
- Pat Evison as Nana
- John O'May as Terry
- Dennis Miller as Lou
- Norman Erskine as Hazza
- Melissa Jaffer as Mrs. Booth
- The Swingers: Philip Judd, Dwayne Hillman, Ian Gilroy
- The Wombats: Ned Lander as Robbie, Mark Little as Carl, Ian Spence as Spider, Kerry McKay as Phil, Peter Davies as Timpany
- Lucky Grills as Brewery Truckdriver
- Brian Blain as Brewery Executive
- Geoffrey Rush as Floor Manager
- Donnie Sutherland as Concert Judge
- Kaarin Fairfax as Ice Cream Girl

== Production ==
Although the film is set in Sydney, journalist Stephen MacLean originally wrote Starstruck inspired by his childhood in the Melbourne suburbs of Williamstown and Newport during the 1960s. His mother Isabel owned the then-thriving Newport Hotel (now known as the Newport Social Club) at which he would often spend time, getting to know customers and dancing on the roof, until an overpass was built nextdoor and business quickly dwindled. The pub was then sold to a woman named Rene. Years later, MacLean was living in London when he received an audio cassette in the mail from Rene's son about her recent death and began drafting a screenplay based on his memories. He later pitched the idea to producer David Elfick, who came up with the title Starstruck.

Director Gillian Armstrong's first successful films were a series of short 1970s documentaries about Australian teenage girls, Smokes and Lollies and Fourteen's Good, Eighteen's Better. She then had a breakout international success with her first feature, 1979's My Brilliant Career, the story of a young female aspiring writer in 19th century Australia. Armstrong wanted to do something completely different next as she feared being typecast as a director of either "dour period dramas" or "women's pictures". She originally planned to direct a film about the unemployed working class of modern Australia, as written by a "young communist", but this did not eventuate. After spending another year looking for the right project, she expressed interest in Starstruck but was initially turned down. The producers' first choice to direct was Graeme Clifford, but he ultimately pulled out in order to make Frances. MacLean later became convinced Armstrong was the right choice after meeting her by chance at a party to which she wore high-heeled blue suede shoes, telling her, "Anyone who wears shoes like that should be able to make my movie". The film was one of the first financed under the "10BA" tax system which dominated in the 1980s. The original budget was $2.5 million, which according to Elfick ran "a couple hundred thousand over."

Jo Kennedy caught Armstrong's eye at audition as she wore a bright blue overcoat. Armstrong then asked her to come up with an outrageous skit. Kennedy assembled an outfit out of napkins and, together with Ross O'Donovan, improvised a scene in which the building was on fire. One account of what happened next says that Kennedy and O'Donovan then took an actual firehose in the room and used it to dangle Kennedy out of the window, "11 storeys above ground." Another says that Kennedy exited the building, O'Donovan dangled the firehose out the window and Kennedy used it to climb up and re-enter the room, and then when asked by Armstrong if she could sing, Kennedy got up on the table and began singing an original song named "Isabelle". In any event, the stunt and the pair's natural chemistry led to them both being cast in the lead roles.

Both originated from Melbourne, not Sydney. At the time, Kennedy was unemployed and living in a Warburton warehouse with musicians. Her only acting experience was as Pinocchio in a children's theatre. O'Donovan was still attending high school in Preston. He had not acted before and had little interest in it, but was talked into auditioning by a neighbour. To prepare for the role, Kennedy moved to Sydney and worked as a bartender in Kings Cross.

In a 2015 interview, O'Donovan stated that in his opinion "the Starstruck you saw on screen was not the Starstruck that Stephen MacLean wrote". He revealed that the screenplay changed content significantly in Armstrong's hands from revolving mostly around Angus to revolving around Jackie instead. O'Donovan told the NFSA: "Gillian got him to twist aspects of the plot which was great because she created a new story. The original story was more about Stephen’s perspective on how the music and film industry in Australia had developed in his life and where it might go. There was much more of a visionary component to Angus’ mind rather than the mind of Jackie, who just wanted to be a star."

On the first day of filming, director Phillip Noyce wished the production good luck by sending a "chickengram" to the set; a message carried by a person in a giant chicken suit. Filming was apparently difficult due to "tensions on the set (and) the inexperience of the lead actors, which called for enormous patience on the part of Armstrong and her crew.", disagreements between Armstrong and Elfick, and Armstrong and the film's original musical director who ultimately quit.

== Music ==
The film spawned a soundtrack album, which includes the hit single "Body and Soul" sung by Jo Kennedy. The song was written by Tim Finn of Split Enz and had originally appeared as 'She Got Body She Got Soul' on the band's 1979 album Frenzy. Jo Kennedy's version reached number 5 on the Australian charts in May 1982. The film also featured music by The Swingers (whose leader Phil Judd had previously been a member of Split Enz) and who perform on screen at key moments. The other members were Wayne Stevens (aka Bones Hillman, credited as Dwayne Hillman), and Ian Gilroy.

=== Charts ===
Chart (1982)	Peak position
Australia (Kent Music Report)	13

== Reception ==
=== Box office ===
The film was classified NRC (Not Recommended for Children) which limited promotion options. Clips from the film were forbidden to be shown on the TV show Countdown despite the fact that clips from Hollywood NRC-rated films screened on the show.

Starstruck grossed $1,541,000 at the box office in Australia, which is equivalent to $5.6M in 2020 dollars.

=== Awards ===
Starstruck received three AFI Award nominations, for Best Achievement in Costume Design, Best Achievement in Production Design and Best Original Music Score.

== Legacy ==
Armstrong reflected that while she had enjoyed making Starstruck, she was unlikely to do a film centred on the lives of young people again. She told the Baltimore Sun that the need to play "stage mother" on set had made the age gap between her and the cast evident, reflecting that she "grew old as a result of it all".

Kennedy lost interest in pursuing fame after touring the US to promote Starstruck, later saying that the experience "felt a bit like being eaten alive... months of non-stop talking about myself. It was horrible. I felt like Bette Midler". Her next film acting role was in Wrong World, a dramatic film with a completely different tone, in which she played a drug-addicted young woman who meets a young doctor then goes on a road trip to Nhill, Victoria. In subsequent years, she pursued music and acted and directed in various independent films as well as in theatre. She currently works as a therapist.

O'Donovan was hospitalised with bipolar disorder six months after the release of Starstruck. This was kept out of the media at the time and only became public knowledge when he gave a rare interview in 2015. As it turned out, Starstruck was O'Donovan's first and only acting role. He ended up moving to Cape York, Queensland and becoming acquainted with the Torres Strait Islander community. He still lives in Cape York today, and like Kennedy, also works in mental health.

McLean's followed up Starstruck with the 1986 film Around the World in 80 Ways.

Starstruck was restored by Australia's National Film and Sound Archive in 2015. The new version premiered at the Adelaide International Film Festival. It is considered a cult classic.

In 2019, a stage adaptation was performed by NIDA in Sydney.

== Home media ==
The film was released on VHS in the 1980s, and on DVD by Umbrella Entertainment and Blue Underground in 2005. It has long been out of print in Australia although it is currently available to stream via video on demand on the ACMI website.

== See also ==
- Sydney in film
- List of Australian films
- Cinema of Australia
