= Nique Needles =

Australian actor and musician

- Born: Cornelius Delaney
- Occupations: Artist, musician, actor
- Years active: 1981–present

Cornelius Delaney, formerly known as Nique Needles, is an Australian artist, musician and actor.

== Career ==
=== Music ===
In 1981 Needles formed Melbourne band The Curse along with John Rowell, Graeme Scott (both later briefly members of Models), Nick Barker and Adrian Chynoweth. Needles later went on to front Freak Power with Scott, Barker and Chynoweth. In 1987 Freak Power released a self-titled album through Rampant Releases. In 1992 Freak Power was re-formed with Needles, Chynoweth, Barker, Stu Thomas, and Peter Jones. Jones left the band mid 1994 to join Crowded House to complete their US tour.

In the early '90s, Doghouse followed in the wake of Freak Power; the initial lineup being Needles, Chynoweth, Thomas and Delaney Davidson. The final lineup was Needles, Thomas, Davidson, and Mark Di Marzio.

In 2003 he formed Box Monsters, with whom he played regularly around the Northern Rivers region of NSW until they disbanded in 2006.

=== Acting ===
Needles' first acting role was playing the character Aspro in The Kid written by Michael Gow, performed at Nimrod Theatre in Sydney in 1983.

He went on to play Graham Cummerford with Jason Connery in the film The Boy Who Had Everything, for which he won the 1985 AFI Award for Best Actor in a Supporting Role. He appeared in the film Bliss and played the character Tim alongside Michael Hutchence in the 1986 film Dogs in Space about the early '80s punk scene in Melbourne. He co-starred with Jo Kennedy as Rex in Tender Hooks in 1987, and in 1988 played Australian athlete John Landy in The Four Minute Mile. For his work on As Time Goes By (aka "L'Australieno") Needles received the award for "Best Actor in a Science Fiction Film" at the 1988 Fantafestival in Italy. He was also in the film Smoke 'Em If You Got 'Em.

In 1988, following an extended period of almost back to back film work, Needles went to India where he wandered alone for several months.

He resumed acting in a series of television roles, including playing Darren Mack in the 1994 TV miniseries Janus.

== Filmography ==
=== Film ===
- The Boy Who Had Everything (aka "Winner Takes All") (1984) as Graham Cummerford
- Bliss (1985) as Ken McLaren
- Dogs in Space (1986) as Tim
- As Time Goes By (aka "L'Australieno") (1988) as Mike
- Smoke 'Em If You Got 'Em (1988) as Baxter
- Afraid to Dance (1988) as The Male
- Tender Hooks (1989) ax Rex Reeson
- Beverly Hills Family Robinson (1997, TV movie) as Melvin
- Komodo (1999) as Hippie
- Chameleon II: Death Match (1999, TV movie) as Oscar

=== Television ===
- The Cowra Breakout (1984, miniseries, 5 episodes) as Stinky Smith
- Shout! The Story of Johnny O'Keefe (1986, miniseries, 2 episodes) as Col Joye
- Studio 86 (1986, 1 episode)
- Sword of Honour (1986, miniseries, 3 episodes) as Santa
- The Four Minute Mile (1988, miniseries) as John Landy
- Time Trax (1994, 1 episode) as John Rankin
- Blue Heelers (1994, 1 episode) as Matt Zdenkowski
- Janus (1994-95, miniseries, 7 episodes) as Darren Mack
- Halifax f.p. (1994) as Felicity
- Snowy River: The McGregor Saga (1995, 1 episode) as Pike
- Flipper (1996, 1 episode) as Dr Woodruffe
- Fire (1996, 1 episode) as Rodney Dalton
- The Genie from Down Under (1996, 1 episode) as Barry
- Medivac (1997, 2 episodes) as Leo Vesti / Johnny Ryan
- Beastmaster (1999, 1 episode) as Bone Collector

== Theatre ==
- The Kid (1983) as Aspro, at Nimrod Theatre
