= Marina Finlay =

Australian actress (born 1961)

Marina Finlay (born 1961) is a former Australian actress.

== Biography ==
Finlay was born in 1961, in Sydney, and is a graduate of the National Institute of Dramatic Art (NIDA). She learned to paint from Judy Cassab, for whom she was a model for 30 years.

She began her career as an actor who played notable roles in television soap operas – Lucy Dunlop in The Young Doctors, Elizabeth Drysdale in Taurus Rising, Lainie Dobson in Prisoner and Laura Banning in Sons and Daughters.

In 1990, Finlay left acting to be a painter. She has had several portraits in the Portia Geach Memorial Award. In 2006, her portrait of Hugo Weaving was hung in the Archibald Prize Salon des Refusés. In 2018, she was an Archibald Prize finalist for her portrait of Peter and Susan O'Doherty, and their cat Coco.

Also in 2018, she was the subject of the portrait by another Archibald Prize finalist, Karyn Zamel. Finlay is also the subject of a portrait by Zamel which was a finalist in the 2016 Portia Geach Memorial Award.

== Filmography ==
=== Film ===
Year	Title	Role	Type
1985	An Indecent Obsession	Sue Peddar	Feature film
1988	Afraid to Dance	Checkout Girl	Feature film
1990	A Woman's Tale	Prostitute	Feature film
2000	After the Rain	Tracey	Feature film

=== Television ===
Year	Title	Role	Type
1981	The Young Doctors	Guest role: Lucy Dunlop	TV series
1981	The Added Dimension	Woman	Video
1982	Taurus Rising	Regular lead role: Elizabeth Drysdale	TV series, 26 episodes
1983	Cop Shop		TV series, 2 episodes
1983	Prisoner	Recurring role: Lainie Dobson	TV series, 13 episodes
1984	Special Squad	Guest role: Suzie	TV series, 1 episode
1986	The Flying Doctors	Guest role: Debbie Wilson	TV series, 1 episode
1986	Sons and Daughters	Recurring role: Laura Banning	TV series, 8 episodes
1987	Rafferty's Rules	Guest role: Emma	TV series, 1 episode
1996	Water Rats	Guest role: Gretchen Hart	TV series, 1 episode
1998	Home and Away	Guest role: Christina	TV series, 1 episode
2011	Crownies	Guest role: Trudie	TV series, 1 episode
2021	Talking Prisoner	Herself	Podcast series, 1 episode
