= John Ogden (photographer) =

John "Oggy" Ogden is an Australian photographer, cinematographer, writer and publisher, whose wide-ranging career has encompassed producing television commercials, international documentary making, music video production, drama, and fine art photography.

== Early life ==
Ogden, also known as Oggy, was born in South Australia of Anglo-Irish descent, and may also have some Palawa heritage. He has worked all over the world, his projects spanning diverse cultures and nations including SE Asia, Sri Lanka, China, Japan, Europe, South America, the US, and Indigenous Australia. His work with imagery associated with Aboriginal Australians resulted in the books Australienation (1999), and Portraits From A Land Without People, released in 2009 to coincide with the first anniversary of Australian Prime Minister Kevin Rudd's apology to Australia's Indigenous peoples.

== Education and early career ==
Ogden began his career as a photo-journalist, and continued his personal development by completing an English degree, with a focus on film history and theory. After graduating in 1979, Ogden began his career in filmmaking and advertising.

== Work in film and documentary ==
Ogden credits his documentary filmmaking experience with giving him a good sense of natural lighting, as well as the invaluable experience of witnessing how real people behave in a variety of situations. Notable credits include work as Director of Photography on As Time Goes By, Bad Boy Bubby (second-unit, 1993) and Mission: Impossible (second-unit, 1988–89). His short film House of Sticks (2011) was screened at Flickerfest (Bondi Beach), HollyShorts (Los Angeles) and several other festivals. Some of his photographs and early 16mm footage appear in the award-winning documentary Sea of Darkness.

== Music video ==
Having acted as Director of Photography on over 50 music videos, Ogden has worked with many major artists including Prince, INXS, and Split Enz. In an interview with the Australian Broadcasting Corporation in 2007, he recounted the challenge of filming a video directed by Prince, having signed a contract which expressly prohibited conversation with the artist. Ogden credits working in this medium as teaching innovation.

== Fine art photography ==
Since 2006 Ogden's work has focused on series of fine art photography, and extensive work with Aboriginal Australian imagery. His publishing company, Cyclops Press, began production with Australienation in 1999. Partly inspired by a conversation in which Ogden was upbraided whilst in England in his youth, criticising the near genocide of the Aboriginal populations by the colonial immigrants, and subsequent culture clash, Ogden's 2008/9 work Portraits From A Land Without People is considered to be the most comprehensive pictorial history of the Aboriginal people of Australia produced, honouring fully the Aboriginal cultural code which requires permission to be granted by each individual in every picture. To compile the book, and gain the appropriate permissions, Ogden travelled extensively over a four-year period, examining over 300,000 images, and visiting public libraries, galleries, museums and private collections in every state and territory in Australia. Ogden has described the dedication necessary to complete this task as a "beautiful obsession".

In November 2011 Ogden released Saltwater People of the Broken Bays: Sydney's Northern Beaches, and in November 2012 released the companion book Saltwater People of the Fatal Shore: Sydney's Southern Beaches. Slightly Dangerous: The Cyclops' Cypher, published in May 2013, provides an insight into the inspirations and influences behind Ogden's work. In his foreword to Slightly Dangerous, photographer Tim Page writes: "This is a life well travelled, of a baby boomer who surfs an existential path across six decades, waxing the best of nostalgia against the odds that are self mitigated by the excesses of those times. It is a heritage of the hippest, most gonzo ‘down-under’ attitudes, rendered by images we all wish we had snapped. As if Hunter S. Thompson and Richard Neville shuffled photo cards with Robert Frankian images throughout the deck".
