= Afraid to Dance =

- Directed by: Denny Lawrence
- Written by: Paul Cockburn
- Produced by: Andrena Finlay
- Starring: Nique Needles; Rosey Jones
- Cinematography: Steve Arnold
- Edited by: Richard Hindley
- Music by: Chris Neal
- Production company: Andrena Finlay Productions
- Release date: 1988
- Running time: 87 minutes
- Country: Australia
- Language: English

Afraid to Dance is a 1988 Australian film directed by Denny Lawrence and starring Nique Needles and Rosey Jones. It was shot in 1988 and located at Sydney, New South Wales but was never released theatrically and went straight to video.

== Cast ==
- Nique Needles as The Male
- Rosey Jones as The Female
- Grigor Taylor as Jim Pratt
- Tina Bursill as Driving Woman
- Annie Byron as Betty
- Mervyn Drake as Terry
- Tom Richards as Don Chapman
- Steve Spears as Garage Man
- Allan Penney as Newsagent
- Bill Young as Publican
- Stuart Halcroft as Supermarket Attendant
- Marina Finlay as Checkout Girl
- Fred Welsh as Tom
- Kate Parker as Large Woman
- Angela Cockburn as Supermarket Mother
- David Cockburn as Little Boy
- Coby Cockburn as Little Girl
- Lindsay McCormack as Greg

== Reception ==
The Age's Jim Murphy says "The eccentric qualities of the script don't always work, and director Lawrence hasn't been ruthless enough with scenes that let the film down." Rod Bishop of the Age writes "The meandering screenplay from Paul Cockburn is not enhanced by Denny Lawrence's pedestrian direction but, despite their largely unsympathetic roles, Needles and Jones manage to enliven the film with their performances." Doug Anderson in the Sydney Morning Herald wrote "Another kind of road flick which finds its rhythm a bit too late in the piece to be regarded as a success but one whose credentials are greatly enhanced by the presence of Rosey Jones."

Rosey Jones was nominated for the 1988 AFI Award for Best Actress in a Leading Role and Paul Cockburn was a joint winner of the Best Screenplay Award at the 1988 AWGIE Awards.
