= Jane Stephens (actress) =

British actress

Jane Tryphoena Stephens
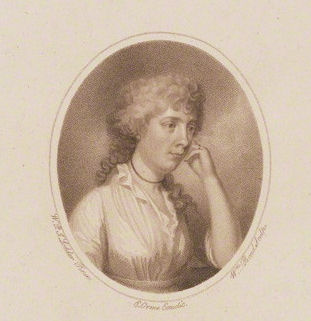
- Jane 'Grannie' Stephens by William Bond
- Born: 1812?
- Died: 15 January 1896; Clapham Common

Jane Tryphoena Stephens (1812? – 15 January 1896) was a British actress who became famous as she became older.

== Life ==
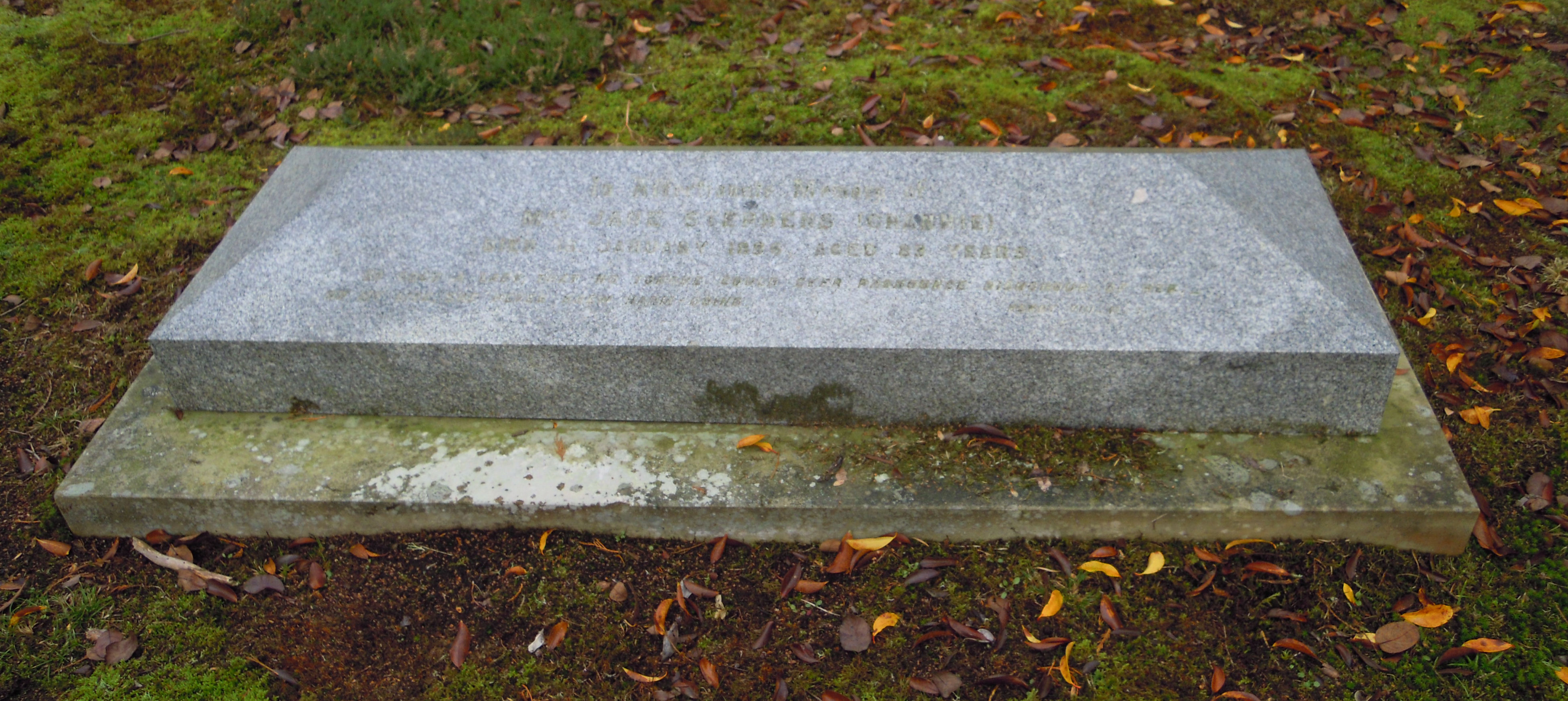
Stephens' grave in Brookwood Cemetery

Her first surname is unknown as she sometimes appeared as "Miss Stephens". She had a husband called Joseph Stephens who was a solicitor's clerk. Before she took to the stage in 1840 she ran a tobacconists. She took a variety of roles but it was not until 1854 that she found her niche. She took on "grandmotherly" type roles in a number of productions and was affectionately known as "Granny" Stephens. She finished her career on 9 July 1889 with a benefit programme at the Shaftesbury Theatre. The committee responsible for promoting the show included R D'Oyly Carte, George Edwardes and C H Hawtrey.

Stephens died in Clapham Common in 1896 of bronchitis. She was cremated on 20 January and her ashes were buried in the Actors' Acre in Brookwood Cemetery in Woking.

== Legacy ==
There is a portrait of "Mrs Stephens" in the National Portrait Gallery by William Bond dating from the early 19th century.
