= Solveig Dommartin =

French actress

- Born: 16 May 1961; Paris, France (Note: Some sources assert she was born in Constantine, Algeria.)
- Died: 11 January 2007 (aged 45); Paris, France

Solveig Dommartin (French: [sɔlvɛɡ dɔmaʁtɛ̃]; 16 May 1961 (Note: Some sources claim her original birth year was 1958.) – 11 January 2007) was a French actress and filmmaker. She appeared in seven major films, including Wings of Desire (1987), Until the End of the World (1991), and Faraway, So Close! (1993). She was also known as a writer (Until the End of the World), editor (Tokyo-Ga), and director (Il suffirait d'un pont).

== Biography ==
Her acting career began in the theatre with Compagnie Timothee Laine and with the Theater Labor Warschau. She began her career in film as an assistant of Jacques Rozier.

Her debut as a film actress was in Wings of Desire (1987), by Wim Wenders, with whom she was in a relationship. She learned circus acrobatics for the role in only eight weeks, and performed without using a stunt double. She co-authored Until the End of the World (1991) with Wenders and travelled around the world with him in search of locations for the project.

Wim Wenders said about Until the End of the World: "Solveig Dommartin and I had written the story of our film together, and we thought that we only had the right to enter into such a sacred area like a person's dreams, if we would bring something into the work that was sacred to ourselves".

She had one daughter, Venus. Dommartin died of a heart attack in Paris in 2007 at the age of 45.

== Filmography ==
Film
Year	Title	Role	Notes
1987	Wings of Desire	Marion	
1989	The Prisoner of St. Petersburg	Elena	
1990	Je t'ai dans la peau	Jeanne	
1990	No Fear, No Die	Toni	
1991	Until the End of the World	Claire Tourneur	
1993	Faraway, So Close!	Marion	
1994	I Can't Sleep	Blonde Woman	
1997	Eiffel Tower Trilogy: Height, Weight & Gravity	Solveig	Short

Television
Year	Title	Role	Notes
1983	Cinéma Cinémas	Herself	TV series documentary
1995	Navarro	Clémence Larue	Episodes: "L'ombre d'un père" "Sentiments mortels"
1996	Commandant Nerval	Suzy	Episode: "A qui profite le crime?"

Editor
Year	Title	Role	Notes
1985	Tokyo-Ga	Editor	Documentary

Writer
Year	Title	Role	Notes
1991	Until the End of the World	Co-story	

Director
Year	Title	Role	Notes
1998	Si il suffirait d'un pont (It Would Only Take a Bridge)		Short
