= Rosey Jones =

Australian actress

- Occupation: Actress
- Notable work: Afraid to Dance

Rosey Jones is an Australian actress. For her performance in the film Afraid to Dance Jones was nominated for the 1988 AFI Award for Best Actress in a Leading Role Other roles include the 1986 TV mini series Alice to Nowhere and on stage in the 1988 Australian premiere of Unsuitable for Adults at Downstairs at Belvoir Street.
