= Jo Kennedy =

Australian actress (born 1962)

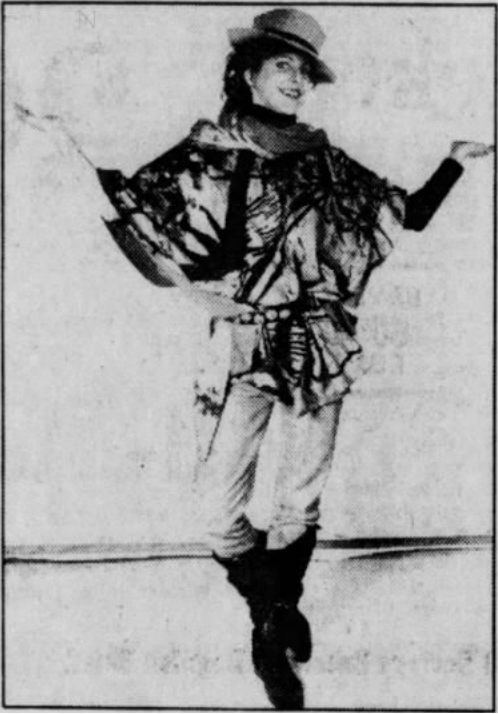
- Kennedy in 1983
- Born: Josephine Marghrite Kennedy; 5 August 1962 (age 63); Warburton, Victoria, Australia
- Occupations: Actress, singer, screenwriter, director
- Years active: 1980–2011

Josephine Marghrite Kennedy (born 5 August 1962), known professionally as Jo Kennedy, is an Australian actress, singer, film director, and screenwriter. Her best-known role is her feature debut as Jackie Mullins in the 1982 musical film Starstruck. She then took roles in dramatic independent films, including Wrong World and Tender Hooks, while also starring in various TV and theatre productions, directing a number of short films herself and pursuing music. In recent years, she has retreated from public life to work as a therapist.

== Career ==
=== 1980s ===
Kennedy grew up in Warburton, Victoria. Her first film appearance was in the 1980 short documentary Hearts in Paradise, which showcased "Jo, a new wave singer... compared and contrasted with Teresa, a would-be mothercraft worker... against the background of society’s general resistance and non-comprehension of that which is new and different."

At age 19, Kennedy got her big break in the 1982 musical film Starstruck. She was cast by director Gillian Armstrong in the lead role of Jackie Mullens despite having no prior acting experience outside of a children's puppet show. During the audition, Kennedy and co-star Ross O'Donovan improvised a sketch in which they pretended the building was on fire, involving Kennedy hanging from a firehose out a window. Specific accounts of the stunt vary, but in any case, it was outlandish enough to win the roles for them both. The soundtrack album spawned a hit single for Kennedy, "Body and Soul". However, she then had to put her singing career on hold for three years because of, according to her, "artistic differences" and "a dud contract" with a record company. Following a gruelling American publicity tour for Starstruck with frequent interviews, Kennedy also decided she disliked the experience of "non-stop talking about (herself)". Ever since then, she has avoided the pursuit of major stardom to focus on smaller, independent projects and creative pursuits.

In 1983, she travelled to "deserted, sub-tropical" St Bees Island to film the documentary Survival. Kennedy, Mike Willesee, Diane Cilento and Dr. Glynis Johns (not the British actress) were given a mission to find a way to survive for a week with no food supplied to them and only one day's supply of water. That same year she appeared as Snake in a Sydney production of The Kid with the Nimrod Theatre Company.

Her next major feature film role was in 1985's Wrong World, a drama in which she played a young woman with a drug addiction who befriends a disillusioned doctor and embarks on a road trip from Melbourne to Nhill. Kennedy was drawn to the role because it was completely different to Starstruck and because she wished to humanise people with a drug addiction. While her performance was not nominated for a local AFI Award, it did win her Silver Bear for Best Actress at the 35th Berlin International Film Festival.

In 1986, she starred in the feminist cabaret TV special The Pack of Women which aired on the ABC. A soundtrack album was released, and Kennedy sang lead vocals on "Is That Me?" which was also released as a single. That same year, she appeared in the play Slow Love at Sydney's Performance Space, a complicated work requiring elaborate cast coordination that is performed in a series of blackouts punctuated by various love songs; the script is written in four columns. She also played Mary in Binge, a play about a woman named Adele who suffers from bulimia, at the Griffin Theatre. Kennedy played Adele's supportive friend Mary who "(parodies) sexual woman but cannot find happiness" and also Adele's mother.

In 1987, she appeared in No Worries at the Q Theatre in Penrith.

In 1988, she appeared alongside Helen Jones in a Sydney production of the Wendy Kesselman play My Sister in This House at the Seymour Centre, based on the true story of two women employed as maids in 1930s France who ended up murdering their oppressive employer and her daughter. That year she also appeared in Court in the Act, an educational film for high school students that warns of the legal repercussions of shoplifting and demonstrates the procedures of the Magistrates' Court.

In 1989, she appeared in Tender Hooks with co-star Nique Needles, a social realist film about a turbulent but loving relationship set in Manly and Kings Cross.

=== 1990s ===
Throughout the 1990s she appeared in a number of other films, TV and theatre productions, and directed many films of her own. In 1990, she appeared in Golden Braid, a film by Paul Cox about a clockmaker who finds a braid of women's hair in an antique cupboard and uses it to masturbate. That year she also played Solveig in a Melbourne production of Peer Gynt and appeared in The Heidi Chronicles. She was also in Our Country's Good, a play based on the story of the 1789 Sydney production of The Recruiting Officer, the first ever play to be staged in colonial Australia.

In 1991, she appeared in The Crucible, a play about McCarthyism transposed to the Salem witch trials.

In 1993 she appeared alongside Paul Chubb in "And a Fire Engine to Go With the Dog", an episode of the SBS series Thirty-Minute Theatre. The episode told the story of an unlikely friendship between a priest who has recently left the church, played by Chubb, and a young homeless woman who aspires to be a rock star, played by Kennedy.

She graduated from the Victorian College of the Arts' Film and Television School in 1997, and there produced the short film The Bridge which went on to win Best Film by a Student and the SBS Eat Carpet Award at the St. Kilda Film Festival.

=== 2000 to present ===
In 2000, Kennedy appeared in the telemovie Waiting at the Royal about four different women who meet in the maternity ward of Melbourne's Royal Women's Hospital. Kennedy played a lesbian, with her partner being played by Noni Hazelhurst. That year she also won the Cinemedia Erwin Rade Award at the Melbourne International Film Festival for her short film Lost.

In 2001, she appeared in Mallboy and also worked on the production as a dramaturg. She also appeared in The Soul Patrol, a radio drama series about a group of angels who act as "heaven's cops", using their powers to "discover why people make the choices that they do and then punish them in the most ironic of ways." Kennedy played the patrol's leader, Billi St. Kilda.

In 2003, she directed and co-wrote with Christine Rogers a film called The Forest which centered on a woman who attempts to answer the question "Is my husband being unfaithful?" and explored potential answers through "various fleeting conversations and phone calls with friends and family members". That year she was set to direct a film entitled Unlocked also co-written with Rodgers, which may not have been finished.

== Personal life ==
Kennedy had a son with "a former partner" in 1994. In 2000, she discovered the Focusing method of psychotherapy and soon began training as a therapist. She has practiced Focusing full-time since 2008, and has mostly kept out of the public eye to concentrate on this work.

== Awards ==
Kennedy won the Silver Bear for Best Actress at the 35th Berlin International Film Festival for her role in the 1985 film Wrong World.

In 1987, she was nominated for an ARIA Award for Best Female Artist.

In 1988, she was nominated for an AFI Award for Best Actress in a Leading Role for the film Tender Hooks.

In 2000, she was nominated for an AFI Award for Best Performance by an Actress in a Telefeature or Mini Series for Waiting at the Royal.

== Discography ==
=== Singles ===
List of singles, with selected chart positions
Year	Title	Peak chart positions	Album
Year	Title	AUS	Album
1982	"Body and Soul"	5	Starstruck (soundtrack)
1982	"Monkey in Me"	72	Starstruck (soundtrack)
1986	"Is That Me?"	-	The Pack of Women (soundtrack)

== Filmography ==
=== As actor ===
==== Film ====
===== Feature films =====
- Starstruck (1982) as Jackie
- Wrong World (1984) as Mary
- The Boy Who Had Everything (1985) as Zenobie
- Tender Hooks (1989) as Mitchell
- Golden Braid (1990) as Diana
- Mallboy (2000) as Janice

===== Short films =====
- Hearts in Paradise (1980) as herself
- Sharky's Party (1987)
- Life Forms (1993)
- Fishing (1993)
- Amor (1997)
- Nailed (1999)
- Vamphyri (2008) as Maroussia

==== Television ====
- Countdown as Co-host (with Ned Lander)
- The Mike Walsh Show (1982) Guest performer sings "Body And Soul".
- 1982 AFI Awards (1982, TV special) as herself
- Stop the Drop (1983)
- Willesee: Survival (1983) as herself
- Pokerface (1986)
- The Pack of Women (1986, TV special)
- Australians (1998) Vivian Bullwinkel episode
- The Flying Doctors (1991) as Eve Rutherford
- Boys from the Bush (1991-1992) as Melissa
- Phoenix (1992) as Elaine Henderson
- Thirty-Minute Theatre (1993) (episode, "And a Fire Engine to Go with the Dog")
- Stingers (1998) as guest role
- Waiting at the Royal (2000, TV film) as Diana

=== As director ===
==== Short films ====
- The Bridge (1997)
- The Roast (1997)
- Skin Deep (1997)
- Quill (1998)
- Lost (2000)
- Unlocked (2003)

==== Television ====
- Short Cuts (2002)
- The Forest (2003) TV movie
