= Return of the Hero (The Flying Doctors) =

- The Flying Doctors episode
- Episode no.: Series 1 Episode 17
- Directed by: Mark Callan
- Written by: Tony Morphett
- Cinematography by: Brett Anderson
- Editing by: Lindsay Parker
- Original air date: 15 September 1986
- Running time: 45 minutes

Guest appearances
- Gerard Kennedy as Les Foster; Peter Fisher as Johnnie; Russell Newman as Ted Foster; Sydney Jackson as Father Jackson; Frank Ottenson as Old Codger No. 1; Herb Krause as Old Codger No. 2

Episode chronology
← Previous "Someone Special"	Next → "Eye of the Beholder"

"Return of the Hero" is the seventeenth episode of the first season of the Australian medical drama The Flying Doctors, first broadcast on the Nine Network on 15 September 1986. It was written by Tony Morphett and directed by Mark Callan. The plot focuses on Les Foster (Gerard Kennedy), a war hero who returns home to Coopers Crossing to die. Les shocks his family and friends when he reveals that he is a homosexual and has AIDS. Dr. Chris Randall (Liz Burch) from the Royal Flying Doctor Service befriends Les and tries to help him through his final days. Meanwhile, Dr. Tom Callaghan's (Andrew McFarlane) replacement, Dr. Geoffrey Standish (Robert Grubb) arrives from Sydney.

The episode marks the first time the subject of AIDS had been covered by an Australian drama series. Serial drama A Country Practice had attempted to create an episode about AIDS earlier that same year, but producer Bruce Best said they struggled to write a script due to continuously changing medical evidence. They would also have needed several episodes to establish the storyline, whereas The Flying Doctors only needed one. Producer of The Flying Doctors, Oscar Whitbread stated that "Return of the Hero" does not sensationalise AIDS, while Kennedy felt the episode was an honest look at the condition. Morphett said his script was "basically a love story". He was inspired by the love and devotion from the partners of the men dying from AIDS, and his script was more about the emotional aspect instead of medical. He hoped to reach more people by writing about AIDS for a popular television series.

Kennedy found the required physical acting of his character's condition to be more difficult than the emotional acting. He was given advice from a nurse on set on how to portray his character's symptoms. In some scenes he had to control the depth of his breathing, and he had to be aware of how much energy it took to do various tasks. "Return of the Hero" also marks the introduction of Dr. Geoffrey Standish, played by Robert Grubb in his first major television role. Grubb replaced Andrew McFarlane, whose character's exit aired in the previous episode. Geoff is a city doctor with a dependency on alcohol, who relocates to Coopers Crossing after the death of his wife. Grubb liked that The Flying Doctors did not shirk away from creating an episode about AIDS, and he hoped it would make people more sympathetic to those living with AIDS.

The episode received a mixed response from critics, while the audience reaction was favourable. Pamela Bone from The Age thought the episode would increase understanding of AIDS and felt that the subject was "handled sensitively, movingly and informatively". Barbara Hooks from the same publication said the episode was ambitious, but while some scenes were "sensitively handed", others had "the subtlety of a sledgehammer." She also thought Dr. Standish's introduction was "stereotypical". Yvette Steinhauer of The Sydney Morning Herald commended the show for tackling the subject of AIDS. She praised the dialogue and realism, but thought the lack of medical information about AIDS was an oversight. At the 1987 Penguin Awards, Kennedy won Best Performance By a Male Actor in a Series or Serial for his role in the episode.

== Plot ==
Ted Foster (Russell Newman) seeks out Dr. Chris Randall (Liz Burch) as he thinks his brother Les (Gerard Kennedy) is quite sick. RFDS pilot Gibbo (Lewis Fitz-Gerald) says he has heard stories about Les's heroics in the Korean war. Les tells Chris he has returned to Coopers Crossing to die, as he has Kaposi's sarcoma and AIDS. Les tries to get Ted accept that he is gay, so that his partner Johnnie (Peter Fisher) can be with him in hospital. At the RFDS base, Nurse Kate Wellings (Lenore Smith) remarks to radio operator Joe Forrest (Gil Tucker) that Chris is tired. Joe assures Kate that the new doctor will be arriving soon. Meanwhile, at the Majestic Hotel bar, Father Jackson tells Chris he knows what is wrong with Les, before offering her help should she need it. Dr. Geoffrey Standish (Robert Grubb) arrives and introduces himself to everyone.

Les collapses while visiting the Majestic. His friends George Baxter (Bruce Barry) and publican Vic Buckley (Maurie Fields) take him to the hospital, but the nurse on duty refuses to admit him as he has AIDS. While Geoff attends his first clinic with Chris, Dr. Turner (John Frawley) calls to let her know Les collapsed and refused treatment. At the bar, the patrons drink stubbies despite Vic telling them the glasses have been sterilised. Les finally tells Ted that he has AIDS. Geoff then upsets Johnnie when he says Les should be in hospital, helping with research. Chris confronts Geoff about his attitude. He later gets drunk while on call. Chris demands an explanation and Geoff tells her that his wife died because he was too busy to notice the symptoms of her illness. He apologises and Chris tells him that it cannot happen again as people depend on them.

The following day, Johnnie goes into town to get Les's medication. Three local men corner him and call him homophobic slurs, but he escapes into his ute. Johnnie tells Les the locals will never accept him for what he is, prompting Les to go to the Majestic and confront the patrons. He throws his medals on the floor, telling them that they can find another hero. He becomes faint and collapses in the RFDS base. Vic states that whatever Les did before or since the war, he won those medals and he displays them. At the homestead, Chris reveals Les has Pneumocystis and only has an hour or so left. Father Jackson arrives with an apology from Vic and George on behalf of the town. After a small Holy Communion service, Les dies in Johnnie's arms. The whole town turns out for Les's funeral, where George calls him a hero.

== Production ==
=== Background ===
The episode was first publicised in the 26 July 1986 issue of TV Week. Writer Stephen Cook reported that actor Gerard Kennedy, known for his "tough guy" roles in Hunter and Division 4, would be playing a homosexual man with AIDS in an upcoming episode of The Flying Doctors. The episode marks the first time the subject of AIDS had been dealt with in an Australian drama series. Kennedy was in favour of Australian television series exploring contentious issues, stating "I suppose AIDS is a subject about which people know very little, and there is a lot of confusion about it. Bringing it out in drama is one of the best forms of disseminating information."

Yvette Steinhauer of The Sydney Morning Herald recalled that serial drama A Country Practice had attempted an episode about AIDS earlier that year, but after asking the shows researchers to look into the subject, producer Bruce Best said they could not write a "definitive" script due to the continuously changing medical evidence. He explained that they wanted to counter the "hysteria" over the condition, but when they were unable to get conclusive answers to their questions, they decided not to go through with it. Steinhauer also pointed out that for A Country Practice, they would need to introduce a new character and establish the storyline over several episodes, while The Flying Doctors was able to do it in one. The show's producer Oscar Whitbread told Steinhauer that they sought to avoid sensationalising the subject, saying "it's a very sad and serious epidemic and I think that's why I wanted it in." Whitbread expected some backlash over the episode's content from the public, particularly those who were homophobic.

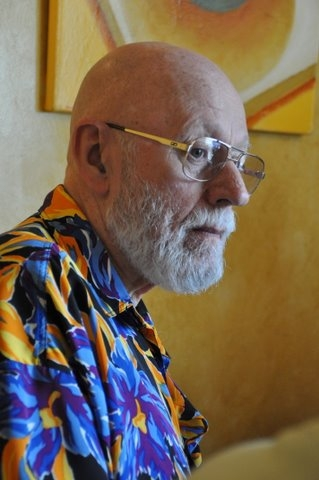
Tony Morphett's interest was more about the emotional side than the medical. He said his script was "basically a love story".

=== Writing and filming ===
Kennedy felt the episode was "a very honest look at AIDS", and he could tell from his first read through of Morphett's script that the subject had been "approached well". He also believed that a lot of moments in the script clarified a number of points for those who worked on the show. Morphett described his script as "basically a love story" and explained that during his research, he was impressed by the love and devotion shown by the partners of the men dying from AIDS. He thought it was "incredibly beautiful to see" and he wanted to write a script about it. Morphett's interest was more about the emotional aspect instead of medical, which he felt needed more understanding. He hoped that by writing about AIDS for a popular television series, more people could be reached. "Return of the Hero" was filmed in June 1986.

Kennedy's character Les Foster was billed as "a Cooper's Crossing favourite", who has a reputation for being good with women. Upon his return to the town after a number of years in the city, Les informs his family and friends that not only has he been in a relationship with another man for twenty years, he is also dying of AIDS. Cook said the news comes as "a huge shock to the isolated townsfolk." Les also has Kaposi's sarcoma, a cancer that commonly occurs in people with AIDS. Kennedy found the physical acting of his character's condition to be more difficult than the emotional acting. A nurse on set provided advice as to what would be happening to Les and how Kennedy could portray his symptoms. Kennedy stated: "Les is being pumped with drugs so his symptoms will flare up, then they'll be pacified by more drugs, then flare again but not always in exactly the same place. The disease attacks different parts of the body in a lot of different ways." Kennedy was not required to lose weight for the role, but in order to portray the symptoms Les was experiencing, he had to control the depth of his breathing and be aware of how much energy it took to do a certain task, which he said was the hardest aspect of the role.

=== Introduction of Dr. Geoff Standish ===
The episode also marks the introduction of Robert Grubb as Dr. Geoffrey "Geoff" Standish, following the departure of Andrew McFarlane, who played original character Dr. Tom Callaghan. McFarlane quit the series at the beginning of the year in order to travel overseas and his exit aired in the previous episode. The role of Dr. Standish marked Grubb's first major television role, following bit parts and a three week guest role in A Country Practice. He was surprised to learn that he would be playing a main character, as he auditioned for the show believing he would be playing a third doctor with McFarlane and Liz Burch, who plays Dr. Chris Randall, as the leads. Grubb initially signed up for ten episodes, with an option for a further six.

Shortly after he began filming, the crew went on strike. Grubb commented: I had just struck a blow and the crew went out. That was it for two weeks, then I had to pick everything up and start again." He admitted to being "very nervous" about joining the show, as it was unlike anything he had done before, so he spoke with friends who worked in television to gain some insight into how everything worked. He had also never watched The Flying Doctors prior to being cast, and assumed the show was just about a community in a small town similar to A Country Practice. Upon reading the script, Grubb learnt that his character is "a highly successful" city doctor, who relocates to Coopers Crossing after misdiagnosing his wife, who later dies from cancer, leading him to develop a dependency on alcohol.

Grubb described Geoff as "stiff", which led him to try and "inject some humour into him." He also discovered during rehearsals that the producers were hoping his character would become a hero to replace McFarlane, but Grubb had spent many hours making his character an anti-hero that it was too late to change for his first episode. Geoff subsequently quits alcohol in the following episode. Geoff interacts with Kennedy's character during "Return of the Hero", and Grubb liked that the show was tackling "some topical issues" and not "shirking away" from the subject of AIDS. Grubb commented: "Hopefully, it will make people more sympathetic towards AIDS victims." He also felt that if the episode provoked a discussion among viewers after it aired, then the show was "worth something."

== Reception ==
James Oram, author of The Flying Doctors: The Inside Story, said that "Return of the Hero" attracted a mixed reaction from the critics. Pamela Bone from The Age simultaneously reviewed both "Return of the Hero" and Geoffrey Robertson's Hypotheticals: "Does Dracula Have Aids", which aired on 2 October 1986. She pointed out that AIDS was "a serious problem" in Australia with 50,000 people having the virus at the time, and that both shows "serve to increase our understanding of it." In regards to The Flying Doctors, Bone felt the subject matter was "handled sensitively, movingly and informatively" within the episode. She also observed how Dr. Randall was "non-judgmental and caring" towards Les, while in contrast Dr. Turner was "aghast" at Les's condition and homosexuality.

Bone's fellow Age critic Barbara Hooks branded the episode "nothing short of ambitious", as it introduced a new "key" character and dealt with a subject "Australian serials have consistently shied away from". Hooks felt that Morphett's script ended with "a predictably neat, uplifting note" and resorted to using "every stereotypical character and situation in the book". She also said that some scenes were "quite sensitively handed", while others had "the subtlety of a sledgehammer", but she commended the show for having "the guts" to tackle the issue of AIDS. Hooks went on to brand Dr. Standish's introduction "stereotypical", as he arrived with "an attitude problem" like the doctors before him, alienated the locals and ended up getting drunk on the job. She pointed out that viewers were left with no doubts that he would have a redemption arc in the following episodes and "secure a place in the hearts of the people forever."

Steinhauer (The Sydney Morning Herald) commended the show for tackling the subject of AIDS "head-on", and for its "candid" dialogue and realism, writing "the result is a sensitive and responsible treatment of the topic." However, she thought the lack of medical information about AIDS was "a slight oversight" in a show focusing on doctors, and criticised the "bizarre scenes of 'poofter bashing'", which made the residents of Coopers Crossing come across as "sub-human". Steinhauer also said that the "one big flaw" with the script were the scenes in which Les's brother and the Coopers Crossing residents finally accept him because he is a Korean war hero. Steinhauer questioned whether they would have accepted him if he had been "a truck driver without further proof of acceptable 'masculinity'."

In March 1987, Christopher Day of TV Week reported that the audience response to the episode was "favourable". For his portrayal of Les, Kennedy won Best Performance By a Male Actor in a Series or Serial at the 1987 Penguin Awards. On the strength of his guest appearance, Kennedy was later invited back to the series to play the larger role of farrier Luke Mitchell.
