= John Sexton (producer) =

Australian film producer

John Sexton is an Australian film producer.

In the 1990s he produced a series of international co production TV movies with imported stars where the theme was "women under threat".

== Filmography ==
- Fatty Finn (1980) - executive producer
- Ginger Meggs (1982) - story, producer
- Phar Lap (1983) - producer
- Burke & Wills (1985) - producer
- Bodysurfer (1989) (TV) - executive producer
- Minnamurra (1989) - writer, producer
- Crimebroker (1993) - producer
- The Seventh Floor (1994) - story, producer
- Blackwater Trail (1995) - producer
- Back of Beyond (1995) - producer
- Little White Lies (1996) - producer
- The Love of Lionel's Life (2000) - executive producer
