= List of The Flying Doctors episodes =

The Flying Doctors is an Australian television medical drama series. Produced by Crawford Productions, it was first broadcast on the Nine Network on 26 May 1986. The series centres around the everyday lifesaving efforts of the Royal Flying Doctor Service of Australia. It was preceded by a three-part miniseries in 1985, and 221 episodes were produced over nine seasons.

The Flying Doctors aired until 6 October 1992. In January 1993, the series was renamed R.F.D.S. (The Royal Flying Doctor Service) and revamped with new characters and a new setting. This season has been included as season 10 on steaming services and in Crawford Productions' official DVD release.

== Series overview ==
Series	Episodes	Originally released	
Series	Episodes	First released	Last released
Miniseries	3	29 April 1985	1 May 1985
1	26	26 May 1986	17 November 1986
2	24	9 July 1987	25 February 1988
3	26	3 March 1988	1 September 1988
4	24	8 September 1988	11 May 1989
5	26	18 May 1989	16 November 1989
6	20	8 February 1990	28 June 1990
7	20	5 July 1990	21 November 1990
8	26	24 January 1991	25 July 1991
9	29	1 August 1991	6 October 1992

== The Flying Doctors (1985) ==
The show began with a three-part miniseries broadcast on the Nine Network on 29 April 1985. It starred Andrew McFarlane and Lorna Patterson as Dr Tom Callaghan and Liz Drever. The series was filmed over three months at locations in New South Wales, Victoria, and South Australia.

No.	Title	Directed by	Written by	Original release date
1	"Part One"	Pino Amenta	Terry Stapleton	29 April 1985
2	"Part Two"	Pino Amenta	Terry Stapleton and Vincent Moran	30 April 1985
3	"Part Three"	Pino Amenta	Vincent Moran	1 May 1985

== Episodes ==
=== Series 1 (1986) ===
No. overall	No. in season	Title	Directed by	Written by	Original release date
1	1	"Will to Survive"	Rob Stewart	Tony Morphett	26 May 1986
2	2	"Trial by Gossip"	Rob Stewart	Christine McCourt	2 June 1986
3	3	"Hot Enough For You"	Arch Nicholson	Vincent Moran	9 June 1986
4	4	"Dreams of Sand"	Arch Nicholson	Peter Hepworth	16 June 1986
5	5	"Public Property"	Colin Budds	Denise Morgan	23 June 1986
6	6	"Is Nothing Sacred?"	Colin Budds	Peter Schreck	30 June 1986
7	7	"Square Pegs"	Chris Langman	Howard Griffiths	7 July 1986
8	8	"Sins of the Fathers"	Chris Langman	Peter Pinne	14 July 1986
9	9	"Rally to the Cause"	Brendan Maher	Peter Herbert	21 July 1986
10	10	"Talk of the Town"	Brendan Maher	Mary Dagmar-Davies	28 July 1986
11	11	"Do You Read Me?"	Colin Budds	Galia Hardy	4 August 1986
12	12	"E.T. – New Girl In Town"	Colin Budds	Vincent Gil	11 August 1986
13	13	"A Choice Of Enemies"	Dan Burstall	Judith Colquhoun	18 August 1986
14	14	"Departures"	Dan Burstall	Graham Hartley	25 August 1986
15	15	"A Lost Generation"	Brendan Maher	Gwenda Marsh	1 September 1986
16	16	"Someone Special"	Brendan Maher	John Reeves	8 September 1986
17	17	"Return of the Hero"	Mark Callen	Tony Morphett	15 September 1986
18	18	"Eye of the Beholder"	Mark Callen	Cassandra Carter	22 September 1986
19	19	"Like a Death In The Family"	Dan Burstall	Roger Dunn	29 September 1986
20	20	"Fearless Frank"	Colin Budds	Peter Hepworth	6 October 1986
21	21	"Million-Acre Prison"	Dan Burstall	Peter Schreck	13 October 1986
22	22	"Forgiveness"	Colin Budds	Annie Beach & Graham Hartley	20 October 1986
23	23	"Acceptance"	Mark Defriest	Graham Hartley	27 October 1986
24	24	"The Show Goes On"	Mark Defriest	Vincent Moran	3 November 1986
25	25	"To The Rescue"	Colin Budds	Vincent Moran	10 November 1986
26	26	"Into The Future"	Colin Budds	Vincent Moran	17 November 1986

=== Series 2 (1987–88) ===
No. overall	No. in season	Title	Directed by	Written by	Original release date
27	1	"Good Day For It"	Mark Callen	Michael Joshua	9 July 1987
28	2	"Horses For Courses"	Mark Callen	Denise Morgan	16 July 1987
29	3	"The Unluckiest Boy In Town"	Rod Hardy	Vince Moran	23 July 1987
30	4	"It Isn't Cricket"	Rod Hardy	Peter Pinne	30 July 1987
31	5	"An Only Child"	Mark Defriest	Graham Hartley	6 August 1987
32	6	"A Love Story"	Mark Defriest	Cassandra Carter	13 August 1987
33	7	"Keeping Up Appearances"	Mark Defriest	Michael Joshua	20 August 1987
34	8	"All Things Bright And Beautiful"	Mark Defriest	Shane Brennan	27 August 1987
35	9	"My Name Is Sky"	Ian Barry	Luis Bayonas	3 September 1987
36	10	"Bachelors and Spinsters"	Ian Barry	John Alsop	10 September 1987
37	11	"Fifty-Two Hours Straight"	Mark Callan	Mary Dagmar Davies	17 September 1987
38	12	"A Friend Of A Friend"	Mark Callan	Leon Saunders	24 September 1987
39	13	"Friends and Lovers"	Mark Defriest	John Reeves	1 October 1987
40	14	"Realms Of Gold"	Mark Defriest	Peter Hepworth	8 October 1987
41	15	"The Hometown Hero"	Brendan Maher	Alison Nisselle	15 October 1987
42	16	"A Distant Echo"	Brendan Maher	Tony Morphett	22 October 1987
43	17	"No Laughing Matter"	Dan Burstall	Graham Hartley	29 October 1987
44	18	"No Quarter Asked"	Dan Burstall	Denise Morgan	5 November 1987
45	19	"Myths and Legends"	Colin Budds	Shane Brennan	12 November 1987
46	20	"The Hitch-Hiker"	Colin Budds	Luis Bayonas	19 November 1987
47	21	"Give a Dog a Bad Name"	Dan Burstall	Vince Moran	27 October 1988
Note: This episode aired out-of-order a year after the season aired, however it was produced as the show's 47th episode and current episode listings reflect that.
48	22	"Every Day a Gift"	Dan Burstall	Leon Saunders	11 February 1988
49	23	"Bearing Gifts"	Mark Defriest	Michael Joshua	18 February 1988
50	24	"Repeat Performance"	Mark Defriest	Tony Morphett	25 February 1988

=== Series 3 (1988) ===
No. overall	No. in season	Title	Directed by	Written by	Original release date
51	1	"The Noble Art"	Brendan Maher	Peter Hepworth	3 March 1988
52	2	"Sapphire"	Brendan Maher	Graham Hartley	10 March 1988
53	3	"Cries From The Heart"	Chris Langman	Shane Brennan	17 March 1988
54	4	"All in a Days Work"	Chris Langman	Luis Bayonas	24 March 1988
55	5	"Out of a Clear Blue Sky"	Colin Budds	Leon Saunders	31 March 1988
56	6	"Affirmative Action"	Colin Budds	Denise Morgan	7 April 1988
57	7	"Figures in Landscape"	Catherine Millar	Peter Kinloch	14 April 1988
58	8	"The Devil You Know"	Catherine Millar	Michael Joshua	21 April 1988
59	9	"Operating Solo"	Paul Moloney	Mary Dagmar Davies	28 April 1988
60	10	"The Path of True Love"	Paul Moloney	Andrew Kennedy	5 May 1988
61	11	"The Kid"	Colin Budds	Shane Brennan	19 May 1988
62	12	"The First Step"	Colin Budds	John Alsop	26 May 1988
63	13	"Hopscotch"	Chris Langman	Alan Hopgood	2 June 1988
64	14	"Jacks High"	Chris Langman	Denise Morgan	9 June 1988
65	15	"Clapped Out"	Brendan Maher	Tony Morphett	16 June 1988
66	16	"Private Lives, Public Faces"	Brendan Maher	Cassandra Carter	23 June 1988
67	17	"Wedlock"	Paul Moloney	David Phillips	30 June 1988
68	18	"The Wranglers Daughter"	Paul Moloney	Peter Kinloch	7 July 1988
69	19	"Borrowed Time"	Mark Defriest	Leon Saunders	14 July 1988
70	20	"The Forbidden"	Mark Defriest	Andrew Kennedy	21 July 1988
71	21	"She'll Be Right"	Brendan Maher	Shane Brennan	28 July 1988
72	22	"One Final Request"	Brendan Maher	Denise Morgan	4 August 1988
73	23	"Roxanne"	Chris Adshead	Peter Hepworth	11 August 1988
74	24	"Don't Tell Anybody"	Chris Adshead	Luis Bayonas	18 August 1988
75	25	"No Way Back"	Colin Budds	Alison Nisselle	25 August 1988
76	26	"Johnnie Come Home"	Colin Budds	Tony Morphett	1 September 1988

=== Series 4 (1988–89) ===
No. overall	No. in season	Title	Directed by	Written by	Original release date
77	1	"Look, Up In The Sky"	Mark Callan	John Alsop	8 September 1988
78	2	"Preacher Man"	Mark Callan	Alan Hopgood	15 September 1988
79	3	"The Fear – Part 1"	Brendan Maher	Andrew Kennedy	22 September 1988
80	4	"The Fear – Part 2"	Brendan Maher	David Boutland	29 September 1988
81	5	"Fair Go"	Paul Moloney	Shane Brennan	6 October 1988
82	6	"Broken Airwaves"	Paul Moloney	Denise Morgan	13 October 1988
83	7	"Bed and Board"	Brendan Maher	Luis Bayones	20 October 1988
84	8	"Breaking the Drought"	Brendan Maher	John Reeves	3 November 1988
85	9	"Family Secrets – Part 1"	Mark Defriest	Tony Morphett	10 November 1988
86	10	"Family Secrets – Part 2"	Mark Defriest	Tony Morphett	17 November 1988
87	11	"All You Need Is Luck"	Colin Budds	Annie Beach	9 February 1989
88	12	"The Silly Season"	Colin Budds	Cliff Green	16 February 1989
89	13	"Every Situation"	Arch Nicholson	Michael Joshua	23 February 1989
90	14	"The Storyteller"	Arch Nicholson	Shane Brennan	2 March 1989
91	15	"The Choice"	Mark Defriest	Denise Morgan	9 March 1989
92	16	"A Shade of Doubt"	Mark Defriest	Neil Luxmoore	16 March 1989
93	17	"Mick and Julia"	Brendan Maher	Luis Bayonas	23 March 1989
94	18	"The Deal"	Brendan Maher	Tony Morphett	30 March 1989
95	19	"A Thing of Beauty"	Marcus Cole	Brian Wright	6 April 1989
96	20	"Cadenza"	Marcus Cole	Alan Hopgood	13 April 1989
97	21	"Mates"	Mandy Smith	Shane Brennan	20 April 1989
98	22	"The Child"	Mandy Smith	David Boutland	27 April 1989
99	23	"Next To Go"	Brendan Maher	Tony Morphett	4 May 1989
100	24	"Gotta Have Friends"	Brendan Maher	Denise Morgan	11 May 1989

=== Series 5 (1989) ===
No. overall	No. in season	Title	Directed by	Written by	Original release date
101	1	"The Gift"	Brendan Maher	Chris Page	18 May 1989
102	2	"Second Chance"	Brendan Maher	Denise Morgan	25 May 1989
103	3	"Not The Malarvys"	Catherine Millar	Shane Brennan	1 June 1989
104	4	"The Adventure"	Catherine Millar	Luis Bayonas	8 June 1989
105	5	"No Man's Land"	Paul Moloney	Annie Beach	15 June 1989
106	6	"Rising Sundown"	Paul Moloney	Alan Hopgood	22 June 1989
107	7	"Man and Boy"	Brendan Maher	Shane Brennan	29 June 1989
108	8	"The Longing"	Brendan Maher	Vince Moran	6 July 1989
109	9	"Bitter Harvest"	Catherine Millar	Craig Wilkins and Anne Lucas	13 July 1989
110	10	"The Instrument"	Catherine Millar	Alan Hopgood	20 July 1989
111	11	"Word and Deed"	Mandy Smith	Mary Dagmar Davies	27 July 1989
112	12	"All That Glitters"	Mandy Smith	Luis Bayonas	3 August 1989
113	13	"Fly Past"	Bill Hughes	Shane Brennan	10 August 1989
114	14	"The Last Rodeo"	Bill Hughes	Leon Saunders	17 August 1989
115	15	"The Chips Are Down"	Colin Budds	Annie Beach	24 August 1989
116	16	"Sky Above, Earth Below"	Paul Moloney	Shane Brennan	31 August 1989
117	17	"Lucky Lady"	Paul Moloney	Shane Brennan	7 September 1989
118	18	"Guardian Angel"	Colin Budds	Leon Saunders	14 September 1989
119	19	"Battlers"	Gary Conway	Peter Hepworth and Craig Wilkins	21 September 1989
120	20	"No Tears"	Gary Conway	Terry Stapleton	28 September 1989
121	21	"A Doctor's Dreaming"	Pino Amenta	Mary Dagmar Davies	5 October 1989
122	22	"Blues For Judy"	Pino Amenta	Peter Kinloch	12 October 1989
123	23	"The Claim"	Colin Budds	Luis Bayonas	19 October 1989
124	24	"A Rhyme for Reason"	Colin Budds	Jan Sardi	26 October 1989
125	25	"Dad's Little Bloke"	Arch Nicholson	Anne Lucas	2 November 1989
126	26	"A Sporting Life"	Arch Nicholson	David Allen	16 November 1989

=== Series 6 (1990) ===
No. overall	No. in season	Title	Directed by	Written by	Original release date
127	1	"A Good Drop Of Red"	Pino Amenta	Vince Moran	8 February 1990
128	2	"The Hero"	Catherine Millar	Vince Moran	15 February 1990
129	3	"Suspicion"	Pino Amenta	Story by : Shane Brennan; Teleplay by : John Lord	22 February 1990
130	4	"Daddy's Girl"	Catherine Millar	Peter Kinloch	1 March 1990
131	5	"Two Sisters Running"	Catherine Millar	Shane Brennan	15 March 1990
132	6	"Dangerous Games"	Ian Gilmour	Terry Stapleton	22 March 1990
133	7	"Milk Run"	Catherine Millar	Tom Hegarty	29 March 1990
134	8	"Point of No Return"	Pino Amenta	Joe Kelly	5 April 1990
135	9	"Small Mercies"	Ian Gilmour	David Allen	12 April 1990
136	10	"A Painful Extraction"	Pino Amenta	Denise Morgan	19 April 1990
137	11	"The Climber"	Pino Amenta	Leonard Rosen	26 April 1990
138	12	"Dead Reckoning"	Kath Hayden	Vince Moran	3 May 1990
139	13	"A Bride To Be"	Brendan Maher	Tim Gooding	10 May 1990
140	14	"A Place for the Night"	Brendan Maher	Howard Griffiths	17 May 1990
141	15	"End of the Rainbow"	Ian Gilmour	Julie Phillips	24 May 1990
142	16	"Double Vision"	Viktors Ritelis	David Allen	31 May 1990
143	17	"The Boy in the Boot"	Pino Amenta	Vince Moran	7 June 1990
144	18	"Windows of the Soul"	Catherine Millar	Sue Hore	14 June 1990
145	19	"Rest In Peace"	Ian Gilmour	Shane Brennan	21 June 1990
146	20	"Life Line"	Viktors Ritelis	Lynn Palmer	28 June 1990

=== Series 7 (1990) ===
No. overall	No. in season	Title	Directed by	Written by	Original release date
147	1	"Fly Like A Bird"	Rob Stewart	Vince Moran	5 July 1990
148	2	"A Day To Remember"	Rob Stewart	Marie Trevor	12 July 1990
149	3	"A Place To Call Home"	Karl Zwicky	Joss Moorhouse	19 July 1990
150	4	"Divided Loyalties"	Karl Zwicky	Shane Brennan	26 July 1990
151	5	"A Rural Education"	Kath Hayden	Cliff Green	2 August 1990
152	6	"Brother's Keeper"	Kendal Flanagan	Peter Kinloch	9 August 1990
153	7	"The Ties That Bind"	Kath Hayden	Judy Colquhoun	15 August 1990
154	8	"A Little Tenderness"	Riccardo Pellizzeri	Angela Martin	22 August 1990
155	9	"Wilderness"	Kendal Flanagan	Julie Philips	29 August 1990
156	10	"Valentine's Day"	Riccardo Pellizzeri	Sam Wilde	5 September 1990
157	11	"Poet's Corner"	Graham Thorburn	Paul Hogan	12 September 1990
158	12	"The Family Farm"	Graham Thorburn	Robert Matthews	19 September 1990
159	13	"A Place To Belong"	Catherine Millar	Jutta Goetze	26 September 1990
160	14	"Break Away"	Catherine Millar	Leonard Rosen	3 October 1990
161	15	"Billie and Pete"	Mark DeFriest	Julie Phillips	10 October 1990
162	16	"Old Man Weed"	Mark DeFriest	John Reeves	17 October 1990
163	17	"David and Goliath"	Colin Budds	Vince Moran	24 October 1990
164	18	"Last Carnival"	Colin Budds	Vince Gil	31 October 1990
165	19	"Innocence Lost"	Joy Crosby	Phillip Roberts and Vicki Madden	7 November 1990
166	20	"Bush Christmas"	Karl Zwicky	Jutta Goetze	21 November 1990

=== Series 8 (1991) ===
No. overall	No. in season	Title	Directed by	Written by	Original release date
167	1	"What a Guy"	Mark DeFriest	Jutta Goetze	24 January 1991
168	2	"Bad Moon Rising"	Mark DeFriest	David Phillips	31 January 1991
169	3	"A New Life"	Ian Gilmour	Vince Moran	7 February 1991
170	4	"Through Thick And Thin"	Ian Gilmour	John Coulter	14 February 1991
171	5	"Deceptions"	Catherine Millar	Julie Phillips	21 February 1991
172	6	"None So Blind"	Catherine Millar	Denise Morgan	28 February 1991
173	7	"The Sleep of Reason"	Kendal Flanagan	Bevan Lee	7 March 1991
174	8	"My Mother's Child"	Kendal Flanagan	David Worthington	14 March 1991
175	9	"Swinging On The Rope"	Brendan Maher	Greg Haddrick	21 March 1991
176	10	"Father and Son"	Brendan Maher	Elizabeth Coleman	4 April 1991
177	11	"A Little Miracle"	Mark DeFriest	Anthony Ellis	11 April 1991
178	12	"Murphy's Law"	Mark DeFriest	Vince Moran	18 April 1991
179	13	"Breaking Down The Wall"	Kendal Flanagan	Maureen Ann Moran	25 April 1991
180	14	"Once Bitten"	Kendal Flanagan	Shane Brennan	2 May 1991
181	15	"Clipped Wings"	Ian Gilmour	Jutta Goetze	9 May 1991
182	16	"Walk Don't Run"	Ian Gilmour	Denise Morgan	16 May 1991
183	17	"Masquerade"	Brendan Maher	Sue Hore	23 May 1991
184	18	"Against The Current"	Brendan Maher	Tony Cavanaugh and Vicki Madden	30 May 1991
185	19	"Last Of The Cochranes"	Kendal Flanagan	Graham Hartley	6 June 1991
186	20	"Double Life"	Kendal Flanagan	Bevan Lee	13 June 1991
187	21	"Something, Nothing"	Catherine Millar	Elizabeth Coleman	20 June 1991
188	22	"Family"	Catherine Millar	Vince Moran	27 June 1991
189	23	"Being Positive"	Ian Gilmour	Bevan Lee	4 July 1991
190	24	"Open Day"	Ian Gilmour	Anthony Ellis	11 July 1991
191	25	"Changing Times"	Kendal Flanagan	Jutta Goetze	18 July 1991
192	26	"Freedom"	Kendal Flanagan	Graham Hartley	25 July 1991

=== Series 9 (1991–92) ===
No. overall	No. in season	Title	Directed by	Written by	Original release date
193	1	"Nymphs And Nightmares"	Rod Hardy	Vince Moran	8 August 1991
194	2	"Out of the Blue"	Rod Hardy	Jocelyn Moorhouse	15 August 1991
195	3	"The Last Dance"	Ian Gilmour	Tony Cavanaugh	22 August 1991
196	4	"Unfinished Business"	Ian Gilmour	Bevan Lee	29 August 1991
197	5	"Jacqueline"	Colin Budds	Elizabeth Coleman	5 September 1991
198	6	"Monkey"	Colin Budds	Everett DeRoche	12 September 1991
199	7	"The Stranger"	Oscar Whitbread	John Coulter	19 September 1991
200	8	"The Christening"	Oscar Whitbread	various	1 August 1991
Note: This is a clip show that aired out-of-order ahead of the season, however it was produced as the show's 200th special and current episode listings reflect that.
201	9	"The Good Book"	Oscar Whitbread	Vince Moran	26 September 1991
202	10	"My Little Patch"	Mario Andreacchio	Vince Gil	3 October 1991
203	11	"Two Splatt Shuffle"	Mario Andreacchio	Graham Hartley	10 October 1991
204	12	"Secrets"	Colin Budds	Peter Schreck	17 October 1991
205	13	"The Games We Play"	Colin Budds	Simon Hopkinson	24 October 1991
206	14	"Bone China"	Stephen Wallace	Bevan Lee	31 October 1991
207	15	"Johnno Be Good"	Stephen Wallace	Everett DeRoche	7 November 1991
208	16	"Lost Rainbows"	Mark DeFriest	Alan Hopgood and Sue Hore	14 November 1991
209	17	"Broken Promises"	Mark DeFriest	Elizabeth Coleman	21 November 1991
210	18	"Visitors Welcome"	Chris Thomson	John Coulter	28 November 1991
211	19	"Yesterday's News"	Chris Thomson	Stuart Wood	5 December 1991
212	20	"Dirty Linen"	Colin Budds	Vince Moran	19 December 1991
213	21	"Chasing Rainbows"	Colin Budds	Jutta Goetze	26 December 1991
214	22	"Uncle Cyrano"	Mike Smith	Vincent Gil	6 February 1992
215	23	"Luck Of The Draw"	Mike Smith	David Phillips and Jutta Goetze	25 August 1992
216	24	"The Accomplice"	Mark DeFriest	Sue Hore	1 September 1992
217	25	"Trouble With M.E."	Mark DeFriest	Jocelyn Moorhouse	8 September 1992
218	26	"Blind Obsession"	Michael Offer	Roger Dunn	15 September 1992
219	27	"Wimp"	Michael Offer	Everett DeRoche	22 September 1992
220	28	"Visionaries"	Ian Gilmour	Glenda Hambly	29 September 1992
221	29	"Life Lessons"	Ian Gilmour	Tony Cavanaugh	6 October 1992
