= The Seventh Floor =

The Seventh Floor may refer to:

- The Seventh Floor (1967 film), an Italian comedy film directed by and starring Ugo Tognazzi
- The Seventh Floor (1994 film), an Australian thriller film starring Brooke Shields
