= Alan David Lee =

Australian actor

- Born: 1955 (age 70–71); Kenya
- Education: National Institute of Dramatic Art
- Occupation: Actor

Alan David Lee (born 1955 or 1956) is an Australian actor.

== Early life ==
Lee grew up on a farm in Kenya before moving to Australia when he was 7.

He graduated from the National Institute of Dramatic Art (NIDA) in 1981. When he had initially applied, he was encouraged to gain practical life experience first, so he withdrew his application and moved to North Queensland where he drove road trains in Mount Isa, cut railway sleepers, and was a truck driver. Following that, he moved to Birmingham, England, where he worked in a steel factory, and with a local theatre company at night. When he eventually reapplied and was accepted at NIDA, Lee says he felt he had more clarity and was more resilient.

== Career ==
Lee's television and film credits include Prisoner, Special Squad, The Cowra Breakout, Murder Call, All Saints, Water Rats, Blue Heelers, McLeod's Daughters and H_{2}O: Just Add Water.

Lee has performed as Hamlet at the Q Theatre; as Jack and Harry Tuesday in the Queensland Theatre Company's Man from Mukinupin; as Chris in Gale Edwards's production of Arthur Miller's All My Sons for Sydney Theatre Company; and as Tom in Tennessee Williams' The Glass Menagerie.

Lee teaches Aboriginal actors at the Eora Performing Arts Centre – where he also directed his first play, Ned Manning's Not This Little Black Duck.

== Filmography ==
=== Film ===
| Year | Title | Role | Notes |
|---|---|---|---|
| 1982 | Wilde's Domain | David Wilde | TV movie |
| 1986 | Twelfth Night | Messenger | Feature film |
| 1987 | Alterations | Robert | TV movie |
| 1991 | Deadly | Constable Barry Blaney | Feature film |
| 1992 | Over the Hill | Carlton | TV movie |
| 1993 | Desperate Journey: The Allison Wilcox Story | E.R. Doctor | TV movie |
| 1994 | Police Rescue: The Movie | Simmo | TV movie |
| 1995 | Sahara | Osmond Bates | TV movie |
| 1996 | The Beast | Les | TV movie |
| 2000 | Risk | Young Auditor | Feature film |
| 2003 | Temptation | Mark | TV movie |
| 2009 | Down Under Mystery Tour | Alan | Feature film |
| 2010 | Kokoda | Brigadier Arnold Potts | TV documentary film |
| 2012 | Mabo | John Byrne | TV movie |
| 2012 | Fatal Honeymoon | Simmons | TV movie |
| 2012 | The Custodian | Bill Nelson | Feature film |
| 2014 | Parer's War | Father English | TV movie |
| 2020 | Bloody Hell | William Hudson | Feature film |
| | Dramatic Monologue | | |
| | Cracked Soles | | |
| | Bandage | | |

=== Television ===
| Year | Title | Role | Notes | Ref |
|---|---|---|---|---|
| 1982 | 1915 | Corporal | Miniseries, 1 episode | |
| 1982–1983 | Prisoner | Tony Berman | 22 episodes | |
| 1983 | Patrol Boat | Vince 'Walshy' Walsh | 6 episodes | |
| 1984 | Special Squad | Jimmy Steele | Episode 36: "Return of the Cat" | |
| 1984 | Carson's Law | Martin Barnes | 5 episodes | |
| 1984 | Bodyline | Eddie Paynter | Miniseries, 2 episodes | |
| 1984; 1991 | The Cowra Breakout | Stan Davidson | Miniseries | |
| 1985 | Possession | | | |
| 1986 | The Great Bookie Robbery | Detective Sergeant Townsend | Miniseries, 3 episodes | |
| | Losing | Ken | | |
| 1987 | Willing and Abel | Gary Conway | | |
| 1987 | Willesee's Australians | Arthur Cushing | Anthology series, episode 8: "Jack Davey" | |
| 1988 | Joe Wilson | Jack Barnes | TV miniseries, 2 episodes | |
| 1988 | A Country Practice | John Nash | 2 episodes | |
| 1992 | Frankie's House | Martin Stuart-Fox | Miniseries | |
| 1993 | G.P. | Jack Connor | Episode: "Fugue in a Minor Key" | |
| 1994 | Police Rescue | Simmo | TV movie: "Police Rescue in Action" | |
| 1996, 2000 | Water Rats | Jim Flemming / Tom McKelvey | 3 episodes | |
| 1997 | Murder Call | Robin Elbin | Episode: "Wages of Sin" | |
| 1998 | Children's Hospital | Terry Voyt | Episode: "Future Shock" | |
| 1999 | Heartbreak High | Army Recruitment Officer | 1 episode | |
| 1999; 2007 | All Saints | Christian / John Jeffries | 2 episodes | |
| 2001–2002 | BackBerner | Gary Morris / Mark Hitchens – Labor MP / Gavin Letchkey – Liberal MP | 5 episodes | |
| | Let's Vote | The President | | |
| 2001 | Corridors of Power | Kev | | |
| 2002 | Blue Heelers | Bruce Hinton | 2 episodes | |
| 2003 | McLeod's Daughters | Eric Cooper | 2 episodes | |
| 2004 | Through My Eyes | Gilroy | Miniseries | |
| 2005 | Love My Way | Father Chris | 2 episodes | |
| 2006 | Blue Water High | Ray | | |
| 2006–2010 | H_{2}O: Just Add Water | Don Sertori | | |
| 2009 | The Cut | Jimmy Bartlett | Miniseries, episode: "Picking the Seam" | |
| 2022 | Expats | Len | | |

== Stage ==
=== As actor ===
| Year | Title | Role | Notes |
|---|---|---|---|
| 1979 | Interview | | UNSW, Sydney with NIDA |
| 1983 | Submariners | Cock | Q Theatre, Penrith |
| 1983 | On the Wallaby | John | Q Theatre, Penrith |
| 1985; 1986 | Jonah Jones | Chook Fowles | Wharf Theatre, Sydney with STC, Playhouse, Adelaide with STCSA |
| 1986 | Mixed Doubles | | Wharf Theatre, Sydney with STC for Sydney Festival |
| 1987 | Hamlet | Hamlet | Q Theatre, Penrith |
| 1987 | Pericles | | Wharf Theatre, Sydney with STC |
| 1988–1990 | The Glass Menagerie | Tom | Marian St Theatre, Sydney, Playhouse, Adelaide with STCSA |
| 1989 | The Man from Mukinupin | Jack & Harry Tuesday | Suncorp Theatre, Brisbane with QTC |
| 1989 | All My Sons | Chris Keller | Wharf Theatre, Sydney with STC |
| 1991 | Rebecca | Jack Favell | Marian St Theatre, Sydney |
| 1992 | The Heidi Chronicles | Scoop | Ensemble Theatre, Sydney |
| 1997 | Milo | Toby | Q Theatre, Penrith |

=== As director ===
| Year | Title | Role | Notes |
|---|---|---|---|
| | Not This Little Black Duck | Director | Eora Performing Arts Centre |
