= Blackwater Trail =

- Written by: Andrew Russell
- Directed by: Ian Barry
- Starring: Judd Nelson; Dee Smart; Mark Lee; Peter Phelps; Rowena Wallace
- Country of origin: Australia
- Original language: English

Production
- Producers: John Sexton; Julie Foster
- Cinematography: John Stokes
- Editor: Tim Wellburn
- Running time: 90 mins
- Production companies: Rutherford Films Holdings; Australian Film Finance Corporation; Pacific Film and Television Commission

Original release
- Network: Network 10
- Release: 1995

Blackwater Trail is a 1995 Australian TV movie directed by Ian Barry and starring Judd Nelson. It was shot in Queensland.

== Cast ==
- Judd Nelson as Matt Curren
- Dee Smart as Cathy
- Mark Lee as Chris
- Peter Phelps as Frank
- Rowena Wallace as Beth
- Gabrielle Fitzpatrick as Sandra
- Brett Climo as Father Michael
- Daniel Roberts as Davies
- Jean-Marc Russ as Terry
- Elaine Maskiel as Nurse Sharon Jay
- Robert Young as Andy Green
- Peter Kent as Attendant
- Brendon Glanville as Waiter
- Peter Mensforth as Brian McCarthy
