= Offspring (disambiguation) =

Offspring is the product of biological reproduction.

Offspring may also refer to:

== Music ==
- The Offspring, an American punk rock band
  - "The Offspring" (album), their debut album

== Arts, entertainment, and media ==
=== Television ===
- Offspring (TV series), an Australian drama series
- "Offspring", a 2001 episode of the supernatural drama series Angel
- "The Offspring" (Star Trek: The Next Generation), a 1990 episode of the science fiction series Star Trek: The Next Generation

=== Films ===
- Offspring (1996 film), an Australian thriller directed by Richard Ryan
- Offspring (2009 film), also known as Jack Ketchum's Offspring, a 2009 horror film

== Other uses ==
- Offspring (character), a character from the DC Comics universe
- Offspring (radio), an early version of the BBC Radio 4 programme Home Truths
- "The Offspring", alternate name for 1987 American anthology horror film From a Whisper to a Scream (film)
- Ofspring Blackall (1655–1716), Bishop of Exeter
- Offspring, a Xenomorph-Human hybrid featured in Alien: Romulus
