= Tony Morphett =

Australian screenwriter (1938–2018)

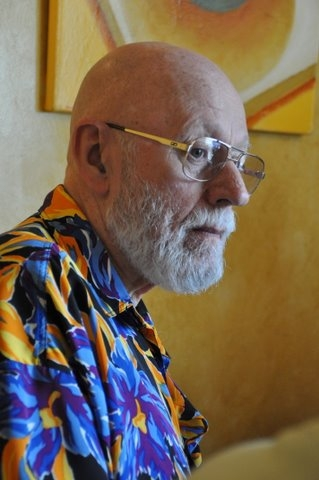
- Morphett in October 2011
- Born: Anthony David Morphett; 10 March 1938; Granville, New South Wales, Australia
- Died: 2 June 2018 (aged 80); Katoomba, New South Wales, Australia
- Occupation: Screenwriter
- Years active: 1964–2018
- Spouses: Betty Savage (m. 1961; div. 1968); Inga Hunter (m. 1969)
- Website: Tony Morphett – The Bottom Drawer

Anthony David Morphett (10 March 1938 – 2 June 2018) was an Australian screenwriter, who created or co-created many Australian television series, including Dynasty, Certain Women, Sky Trackers, Blue Heelers, Water Rats, Above the Law and Rain Shadow. Morphett wrote eight novels, and wrote or co-wrote seven feature films, ten telemovies, twelve mini-series, and hundreds of episodes of television drama, as well as devising or co-devising seven TV series. He won 14 industry awards for TV screenwriting.

== Career ==
Morphett started as a copy-boy and cadet reporter for The Daily Telegraph in 1956.

He moved to the ABC in 1957 where he worked in the ABC Talks Department for 10 years, presenting The Lively Arts and Spectrum. While at the ABC he published his first novels. The second of these, Fitzgerald, was withdrawn on publication in 1965: the reason given by publishers Jacaranda was that its protagonist, an artist, had the same name as a living artist, Paul Fitzgerald.

Morphett's first drama credit was Objector for Australian Playhouse.

He left the ABC in 1968 to become a freelance writer, writing primarily for TV and film. His third novel, Thorskald (1969) was also about an artist, though Morphett referred to them in 1969 as separate works.

Morphett was on the literature board of the Australia Council for four years from 1977–1981, and the board of the Australian Children's Television Foundation for eight years from 1985–1994. From 2003, he was a board member of the Australian Writers' Foundation, and occasionally served on the committee of the Australian Writers' Guild.

Career highlights include writing the scripts for the feature films The Shiralee, The Last Wave and Robbery Under Arms, and creating the television series Blue Heelers, Water Rats and Certain Women.

Morphett was interviewed in 1975 by Hazel de Berg about his career as a writer. The recording can be found at the National Library of Australia. In 1985 he wrote A Hole in My Ceiling about his conversion to Christianity, in which he was influenced by Phillip Jensen.

== Personal life ==
Two marriages:

- 1962: Morphett married Betty Savage, daughter of Major Percival Savage, DSO, MBE and Marjorie Savage (née Hall). They had three children: Daniel, Benjamin and Anna. They divorced in 1968.
- 1969: Morphett lived with and later married Inga Hunter, daughter of Professor T.G. Hunter and Helena Hunter (née Wright). They had two children: Emma (deceased) and Sarah.

Morphett and Inga Hunter lived together in the Blue Mountains, west of Sydney, with a number of cats.

Morphett was the younger brother of Margaret Chandler (nee Morphett). Her death at Lane Cove on 1 January 1963 whilst in the company of Dr Gilbert Bogle (also deceased) remains an unsolved mystery popularly referred to as the Bogle–Chandler case.

== Death ==
In 2007 following a bout of influenza, Morphett suffered heart failure. This left his heart in a weakened state, which eventually led to his death.

On 2 June 2018, after a brief period of hospitalisation, he died at Katoomba Hospital from heart failure. He was with family as he died.

== Credits ==
- A Place to Call Home (1 episode 2013)
- Serangoon Road (1 episode 2013)
- Packed to the Rafters (3 episodes 2009–2010)
- The Legend of Enyo (2 episodes 2010)
- Sea Patrol (6 episodes, 2007–2008)
- Rain Shadow (2 episodes, 2007)
- Blue Heelers (510 episodes, 1994–2006)
- MDA (1 episode, 2002)
- Young Lions (3 episodes, 2002)
- Balmain Boys (2002) (TV) (written by)
- Water Rats (171 episodes, 1996–2001)
- Above the Law (7 episodes, 2000)
- Don't Look Behind You (1999) (TV) (teleplay)
- Kings in Grass Castles (1998) TV mini-series (writer)
- 13 Gantry Row (1998) (TV) (written by)
- Mirror, Mirror (1995) TV series (unknown episodes)
- Heartbreak High (1 episode, 1994)
- The Seventh Floor (1994) (written by)
- Sky Trackers (1994) TV series (unknown episodes)
- Crimebroker (1993) (TV) (written by)
- Secrets (1993) TV series (unknown episodes)
- G.P. (6 episodes, 1991–1992)
- Tracks of Glory (1992) TV mini-series (writer)
- Sweet Talker (1991) (story) (written by)
- Sky Trackers (1990) (TV) (written by)
- Bangkok Hilton (1989) TV mini-series (story)
- Boys in the Island (1989) (written by)
- The Dirtwater Dynasty (1988) TV mini-series (writer)
- The Flying Doctors (10 episodes, 1986–1988)
- The Shiralee (1987) TV mini-series (writer)
- The Riddle of the Stinson (1987) (TV) (written by)
- Dark Age (1987) (screenplay)
- My Brother Tom (1986) TV mini-series (writer)
- Land of Hope (1986) TV series (writer)
- Robbery Under Arms (1985) (writer)
- Winners (1985) TV series (episode 3 "Quest Beyond Time")
- The Flying Doctors (1985) TV mini-series (writer)
- A Country Practice (5 episodes, 1982–1983)
- Under Capricorn (1983) TV mini-series (writer)
- Patrol Boat (1979) TV series (unknown episodes)
- Skyways (2 episodes)
- The Oracle (1979) TV series (unknown episodes)
- The John Sullivan Story (1979) (TV) (written by)
- Against the Wind (1978) TV mini-series (unknown episodes)
- Chopper Squad (2 episodes, 1978)
- Case for the Defence (1 episode, 1978)
- The Last Wave (1977) (screenplay)
- Glenview High (1 episode, 1977)
- The Young Doctors TV series (1976) (writer)
- The Sullivans (1976) TV series (writer)
- Luke's Kingdom (1976) TV mini-series (writer)
- The Alternative (1976) (TV) (written by)
- The Seven Ages of Man (1 episode, 1975)
- The Story of the First Christmas (1975) (TV) (script)
- Elephant Boy (1973) TV series (unknown episodes)
- Boney (5 episodes, 1972–1973)
- Certain Women (1973) TV series (creator)
- The Evil Touch (1 episode, 1973)
- Catwalk (6 episodes, 1971–1972)
- Dynasty (13 episodes, 1969–1971)
- Devlin (1971)
- Delta (2 episodes, 1969–1970)
- The Long Arm (2 episodes, 1970)
- The Link Men
- Australian Plays (1969)
- Australian Playhouse

== Stage plays ==
- I've Come about the Assassination (1966)
- The Rise and Fall of Boronia Avenue (1969)
- The Magic Apron (1969)

== Books ==
- Tony Morphett (1964). Mayor's Nest. Jacaranda Press. (novel)
- Tony Morphett (1965). Fitzgerald. Jacaranda Press. (novel) (withdrawn)
- Tony Morphett (1967). Dynasty. Jacaranda Press. (novel)
- Tony Morphett (1969). Thorskald. Lloyd O'Neil. (novel)
- Tony Morphett (1985). Quest Beyond Time. Penguin Books with Australian Children's Television Foundation. ISBN 0140084096. (science fiction)
- Tony Morphett (1993). The Distant Home. Mammoth. ISBN 1863302182. (science fiction)
- Tony Morphett (1985). A Hole in my Ceiling. Hodder & Stoughton. ISBN 0340271825. (non-fiction)
- Tony Morphett (2013). Starship Home. Amazon. (science fiction)

== Awards and nominations ==
- 1970 Awgie: Tony Morphett for Delta ep. 19 "A Touch Of DFP".
- 1970 Penguin: Tony Morphett – Scriptwriting for Dynasty play.
- 1971 Logie: Tony Morphett – Best Scriptwriter.
- 1971 Penguin: Tony Morphett – Scriptwriting for episode 12 "The Killing Ground".
- 1971 Awgie: Tony Morphett – Best Script For A TV Drama Series for episode 5 "Cry Me A River".
- 1972 Logie: Tony Morphett – Best Scriptwriter, for Dynasty.
- 1978 Sammy Award – best writer TV series.
- 1989 Awgie: Tony Morphett – for "The Damage Done".
- 2002 Awgie: Tony Morphett – for "Letting Go" (Blue Heelers).

== Notes ==
- "The Dictionary of Performing Arts in Australia — Theatre . Film . Radio . Television — Volume 1" — Ann Atkinson, Linsay Knight, Margaret McPhee — Allen & Unwin Pty. Ltd., 1996
- "The Australian Film and Television Companion" — compiled by Tony Harrison — Simon & Schuster Australia, 1994
