= Dee Smart =

Australian actress, model, singer, dancer and painter

- Born: 9 July 1966 (age 60); Adelaide, South Australia, Australia
- Education: Victorian College of the Arts; Ensemble Theatre
- Occupation: Actress
- Years active: 1991–present
- Notable work: Home and Away; Water Rats; Welcome to Woop Woop
- Height: 5 ft 7 in (170 cm)
- Spouse(s): Steve Balbi (divorced); Chris Hancock (1998–present)
- Children: 3 Charlie, Zoe and Johnny Hancock

Dierdre Claire Smart (born 9 July 1966) is an Australian actress, model, singer, dancer and painter. After giving up on being a dancer, she rose to prominence portraying Lucinda Croft in the popular soap opera Home and Away from 1991 to 1992. After leaving the show she appeared in a handful of television guest spots, plays and films, including the 1997 comedy Welcome to Woop Woop, and was known for her appearances as Lady Luck on the variety programme The Footy Show before returning to regular television in the police procedural Water Rats, where she portrayed Detective Senior Constable Alex St. Clare from 1999 to 2001. Her more recent roles include having appeared in the 2011 TV movie Panic at Rock Island and the television shows Miss Fisher's Murder Mysteries in 2013 and Winter in 2015.

She is also known in Australia for being a permanent fixture in the country's tabloids and for her close friendship with billionaire businessman James Packer, with whom she and her husband Chris Hancock lived for a year, and who introduced her to Scientology, of which she became one of the country's most high-profile members. Her eldest daughter, Charlie Hancock, is also an actress and played Verity Darling on the drama series Spirited.

== Early life and education ==
Smart was born in Adelaide, South Australia, the seventh of nine children. She grew up on a large cattle farm outside the city with her parents, four brothers and four sisters. At the age of sixteen, she joined the Victorian College of the Arts, hoping to become a classical dancer, but while she didn't experience much success, she found herself in demand as a model. She then turned to acting, studying with Hayes Gordon at Sydney's Ensemble Theatre.

== Career ==
After studying drama for three years, Smart secured her first ever professional acting role at age 25 when she signed a two-year contract to play Lucinda Croft, the tomboyish niece of old-fashioned school principal Donald Fisher, in the popular soap opera Home and Away. Smart said that she was "a wreck" before filming her first scenes but soon learned to cope with the process and would attend acting classes each weekend. As Lucinda, Smart would have many storylines involving her love interest, policeman Nick Parrish (played by Bruce Roberts), as well as her estranged brother David (played by Guy Pearce), and quickly became one of the show's most popular characters.

Despite this early success however, Smart did not enjoy her work on the show and in December 1991, a mere eight months into her contract, she gave magazine TV Week a "scathing" interview about her role, telling the publication that she felt as though she was completing a "prison sentence", adding that "It feels like I've been here for years". Smart criticised the series' fast production, claiming there was no time to develop a character and said that it was "impossible to do a good job" because of the time limits, noting that she was surprised there was time to do any acting. Smart also spoke negatively about her character Lucinda because she "goes on and on and on - it is kind of abnormal for a character to last this long", ending the interview by saying she would not sign another long-term contract.

The Seven Network, Home and Away's broadcast channel, as well as the show's producers were naturally annoyed by Smart's comments but couldn't release her from her contract since storylines were planned in advance and her character would have to remain in the series for "some time yet". However, less than a year after giving the interview, Smart was publicly sacked via an announcement in TV Week and Lucinda was written out. Unlike many former regulars, she has never returned to the show. Despite these negative experiences, Smart told Inside Soap that she had learned a "tremendous amount" from working on the series and said that she is like her character in that she is not traditional and does not care about doing "the 'done' thing".

In the following years, Smart unsuccessfully attempted to launch a singing career, posed nude in the magazine Black+White, performed on stage in a handful of plays in Australia and Christmas pantomimes in the United Kingdom alongside her Home and Away love interest Bruce Roberts and did not return to the screen until 1994 when she was cast by student director Samantha Lang in her Graduate short film Audacious, which went on to screen at a number of film festivals across the world, winning some awards along the way. She continued her stage endeavors the next year, appearing in two plays, but also went on working in front of the camera, starring in the television film Blackwater Trail and the feature Back of Beyond, which reunited her with Home and Away co-star Rebekah Elmaloglou. That same year, Smart also started appearing as Lady Luck in the variety programme The Footy Show, offering viewers betting tips until 2002. In 1996 she starred in the Australian-Canadian co-production Turning April alongside Justine Clarke, another Home and Away alum, and 1997 saw the release of director Stephan Elliott's Welcome to Woop Woop in which Smart plays a prominent role. The highly anticipated comedy, which premiered out-of-competition at the Cannes Film Festival, was a critical and commercial flop and remains Smart's last theatrical feature to date.

Between 1996 and 1998, Smart appeared in a number of guest spots on Australian TV shows such as Twisted Tales, G.P., Halifax f.p. (reuniting with her Home and Away brother Guy Pearce), Wildside and Murder Call, and starred as Columbia in a 25th Anniversary production of The Rocky Horror Show which ran for two months, but despite offers was reluctant to sign on for a regular television role due to her experience on Home and Away. This changed in 1999 when she was cast as Detective Senior Constable Alex St. Clare in the police procedural Water Rats, a role which she actively pursued, enduring five auditions over three months. Smart's casting proved controversial with tabloids relaying that she got the role thanks to her friendship with Nine Network boss James Packer, which was denied by the producers. She left the show in July 2001, being six months pregnant with her first daughter Charlie, and with other stars leaving and dwindling ratings, Water Rats was cancelled later that same month.

Smart did not work much in the ten years following the birth of her daughter and the end of Water Rats, save for two episodes of the TV show The Alice in 2005 and 2006 and a month-long stint on the play Burnt Piano in early 2008. In 2011 she started a return to the small screen with a supporting role in the disaster television film Panic at Rock Island, followed by three appearances in the second season of the period drama Miss Fisher's Murder Mysteries in 2013, a year in which she also starred in three short films, and most recently two episodes of Winter in 2015.

She was a finalist in the Archibald Prize in 2017 and 2020.

== Personal life ==
Smart married musician Steve Balbi in 1992 at her parents' house in Adelaide, following a three year relationship. The marriage ended in divorce. She was later introduced to futures trader Chris Hancock whom she married in Las Vegas in June 1998 after four years of dating, in front of an Elvis Presley impersonator singing Viva Las Vegas and a congregation of ten people, including billionaire businessman James Packer, a childhood friend of Hancock's, and her Welcome to Woop Woop co-star Rod Taylor, who walked her down the aisle. The couple have three children, including eldest daughter Charlie, born on 28 October 2001, son Johnny and daughter Zoe. Smart gave birth to their youngest child in early 2012 at age 45, an age which was deemed controversial in Australian media.

Smart and Hancock lived together with their pet Jack Russel Terrier Jessie, James Packer and later his then wife Jodhi Meares in Packer's luxury three-level apartment in Bondi Beach following Packer's split with girlfriend Kate Fischer. They all lived together for about a year, with Smart and Hancock helping to plan Packer and Meares' lavish wedding. Packer and Meares' relationship deteriorated when Smart and Hancock, who have been referred to as "the glue in the marriage", moved out in 2000, eventually leading to a divorce. The couple have remained good friends with both parties, as well as Packer's next wife Erica. Prior to living with Packer they owned a house in Rose Bay and afterwards they purchased a terraced house in Woollahra which they sold in 2003.

Smart is also an avid knitter, sewer and painter, and has been exhibited. She was a devout Scientologist starting in April 2003, after she and her husband were introduced to the religion by James Packer. Smart later abandoned the religion as she thought there were good morals to it, but also that the rules required of adherents were too strict. Her eight siblings, who range from seven years younger to thirteen years older than her, are not involved in the entertainment industry and are scattered across Australia and London.

== Filmography ==
=== Film ===
| Year | Title | Role | Notes |
|---|---|---|---|
| 1994 | Audacious | Stella | Short film Director Samantha Lang's Graduate Diploma Student Film at the Australian Film, Television and Radio School; Dendy Award for "Best Fiction Over 25'" at the 1995 Sydney Film Festival; Award for "Best Overall Film" at the 1996 Honolulu Underground Film Festival |
| 1995 | Back of Beyond | Charlie | |
| 1995 | Love Until | | |
| 1996 | Turning April | Kyra | |
| 1997 | Welcome to Woop Woop | Krystal | Premiered at the Cannes Film Festival |
| 2013 | Kite | Nadine | Short film |
| 2013 | Faerie | Natalie | Short film |
| 2013 | Embrace | Elaine | Short film Director George-Alexander Nagle's Graduate Diploma Student Film at the Australian Film, Television and Radio School |

=== Television ===
| Year | Title | Role | Notes |
|---|---|---|---|
| 1991–92 | Home and Away | Lucinda Croft | Series regular, 179 episodes |
| 1995 | Blackwater Trail | Cathy Green | TV film |
| 1995–2002 | The Footy Show | Lady Luck | Variety show |
| 1996 | Twisted Tales | Judy Raven | Episode: Cold Revenge |
| 1996 | G.P. | Becky Rooker | Episode: Will You Still Love Me Tomorrow?: Part 1 |
| 1997 | Halifax f.p. | Fiona Calwell | Episode: Déjà Vu |
| 1998 | Wildside | Kate McCoy | Episode 14 |
| 1998 | Murder Call | Mariena Soeteman | Season 2, Episode 1: Dared to Death |
| 1999–2001 | Water Rats | Detective Senior Constable Alex St. Clare | Series regular, 64 episodes |
| 2000 | Tales of the South Seas | | Episode: The Rabblerouser |
| 2005–06 | The Alice | Maxine | 2 episodes |
| 2011 | Panic at Rock Island | Denny Quinn | TV film |
| 2013 | Miss Fisher's Murder Mysteries | Rosie Sanderson | 3 episodes |
| 2015 | Winter | Penny Bartok | 2 episodes |

=== Theatre ===
| Dates | Title | Role | Locale | Ref. |
|---|---|---|---|---|
| 5 Dec 1991 | Superwoman in the Phantom Zone | Choreographer | Belvoir St Theatre | |
| 22 Dec 1992 – 15 Jan 1993 | Snow White and the Seven Dwarfs | Snow White | Cambridge Corn Exchange | |
| 16 Jun 1993 – 25 Jun 1993 | The Promise (My Poor Marat) | Lika | Marian Street Theatre | |
| 17 Dec 1993 – 22 Jan 1994 | Snow White and the Seven Dwarfs | Snow White | Hull New Theatre | |
| 8 Apr 1994 – 7 May 1994 | Desire | Kate | Crossroads Theatre | |
| 1995 | The Heartbreak Kid | | Ensemble Theatre | |
| 19 Jul 1995 – 19 Aug 1995 | Miranda | Madeline | The Wharf Theatre | |
| 29 Jul 1998 – Oct 1998 | The Rocky Horror Show | Columbia | The Star | |
| 20 Mar 2008 – 26 Apr 2008 | Burnt Piano | Karen Idlewild | Ensemble Theatre | |
