= Farewell, My Love =

2001 film by Randall Fontana

- Directed by: Randall Fontana
- Written by: Randall Fontana
- Starring: Gabrielle Fitzpatrick; Phillip Rhys; Robert Culp
- Music by: Michael Wandmacher
- Release date: 2001
- Country: United States

Farewell, My Love is a 2001 action film by Randall Fontana starring Gabrielle Fitzpatrick, Phillip Rhys, and Robert Culp.

== Movie Info ==
Fitzpatrick plays a kind avenging angel who takes revenge on a mob that killed her family. Robert Culp, Brion James, Phillip Rhys, and Mark Sheppard co-star in this action drama that contains a measure of violence and sex that would appeal to a certain audience.

== Plot ==
A mysterious assassin named Brigit (Fitzpatrick) starts killing apparently unrelated Russian criminals. She befriends an old arms dealer, Renault (James) who trains her and helps her. Brigit reveals that four of them; George (Mitchell), Natalya (Wynter), Sergei (Lauter) and Peter (Foster) invaded her home when she was a teen, killed her father by shooting him, gang-raped and killed her mother, and then molested and wounded her leaving her for dead. However she survived and swore revenge. Peter, the last of the original four to still be alive, manages to ambush her and kills Renault. She joins forces with Renault's son Luc and after some double crossing both her and Luc avenge their parents killing Peter.

== Cast ==
- Gabrielle Fitzpatrick as Brigit
  - Kimberlee Peterson as Young Brigit
- Phillip Rhys as Luc
- Robert Culp as Michael Reilly
- Ed Lauter as Sergei Karpov
- Adam Baldwin as Jimmy, The Bartender
- Brion James as Renault
- Stephen Gregory Foster as Peter
- Sarah Wynter as Natalya
- Hamilton Mitchell as George Karpov
- Constance Zimmer as Kyle
- Mark Sheppard as M.J.
- Craig Aldrich as Paddy
- Jim Landis as Doctor
- Jane Fontana as Club Singer
- Catherine McGoohan as Mrs. Fauve
- Genevieve Maylam as Julie
- Lorielle New as Dahra
- Samantha Lemole as Amy
- Chris Byrne as Chino
- Ron Althoff as Bouncer #1
- Warren A. Stevens as Bouncer #2
- Chuck Hicks as Bouncer #3
- Buckley Norris as Drunk
- Trevor Coppola as Phil Conway

== Technical ==
- Direct to Video
