= Panic at Rock Island =

- Written by: Matt Ford
- Directed by: Tony Tilse
- Starring: Grant Bowler; Dee Smart; Anna Hutchinson; Jessica Tovey; Vince Colosimo; Nathan Page; Zoe Cramond
- Countries of origin: Australia; New Zealand
- Original language: English

Production
- Producers: Rosemary Blight; Dave Gibson
- Budget: $3 million

Original release
- Release: 2011

Panic at Rock Island is a 2011 Australian-New Zealand TV movie made for the Syfy (Australia) Channel.

== Cast ==
- Zoe Cramond as Ari
- Vince Colosimo as Hirsch
- Paul Tassone as Robert Abood
- Ellen Grimshaw as Claire
- Jessica Tovey as Nina Quinn
- Dee Smart as Denny Quinn
- Grant Bowler as Jim Quinn
- Anna Hutchison as VJ Pilly
- Nathan Page as Matthew Cross
- Marshall Napier as Paul Thorpe
- Pua Magasiva as TK
- Damian Walshe-Howling as Rufus Mitchell
- Ben Winspear as Baz Gaha

== Production ==
The film was made with financial support from Channel Nine and Universal Networks International (UNI). UNI purchased the film at the development stage purely on the basis of the storyline.

The film was shot over four weeks on Goat Island and in Balmain, Sydney.

"It's our passion and drive to return to these bigger and higher concept stories which tend to be shyed away from due to budget concerns,” said director Tony Tilse. "Australian telemovies need to present something good and this is a bolder concept than what has ever been done before."

== Awards ==
- 2011: John Hinde Award for Excellence in Science Fiction Writing
