= Dasi Ruz =

Australian actress

Dasi Ruz (professionally also known as Ingrid Ruz) is an Australian actress who has been in several films and television shows.

Ruz is known for her role in the 2007 action-thriller film, The Condemned, written and directed by Scott Wiper. Ruz's character is Rosa, who was awaiting execution in Mexico with her husband, Paco. Rosa and her husband are chosen as contestants and taken to an isolated island, where the program would take place.

Ruz has also appeared on The Starter Wife, The Bill, Water Rats, Blue Heelers, and Above the Law.

== Filmography ==
=== Film ===
- The Condemned (2007) as Rosa
- Happy Feet (2006) as Live Action Cast
- The Angel Files (2002) as Prudence "Pru" Fisher
- Never Tell Me Never (1998, TV movie) as Nurse Sue

=== Television ===
- The Starter Wife (2007, miniseries) as Ana
- Play School (2001) as Presenter
- The Bill (2001) as Agent Costas
- Water Rats (2001) as Sgt. Vanessa Simmons
- Blue Heelers (2001) as Becky Jacobs
- Above the Law (2000) as Vicki Giovanelli
- Queen Kat, Carmel & St. Jude (1999, miniseries) as Jude Torres
- State Coroner (1998) as Siobhan Kearns
