= The Seventh Floor (1994 film) =

- DVD cover
- Written by: Steve Matthews; Tony Morphett; Sean Goodwyn; John Sexton; Bruce Trost
- Directed by: Ian Barry
- Starring: Brooke Shields
- Music by: Roger Mason
- Country of origin: Australia
- Original language: English

Production
- Producers: Chris Brown; Hiroyuki Ikeda; John Sexton
- Cinematography: Martin McGrath
- Editor: Tim Wellburn
- Running time: 99 minutes
- Production companies: Portman Productions; Sogovision

Original release
- Network: Network Ten
- Release: 3 May 1994

The Seventh Floor is a 1994 Australian thriller television film directed by Ian Barry and starring Brooke Shields.

== Plot ==
Kate Fletcher lives in an apartment controlled by a high-tech computer system. The conveniences of the apartment soon end up making her a prisoner, as a psychotic murderer invades her building. The killer believes his long-dead sister is instructing him to kill again.

== Main cast ==
- Brooke Shields as Kate Fletcher
- Masaya Kato as Mitsuru
- Craig Pearce as Ed
- Linda Cropper as Vivien
- Malcolm Kennard as Greg
- Russell Newman as Detective Riley
