= Outriders (TV series) =

- Country of origin: Australia
- No. of seasons: 1
- No. of episodes: 26

Production
- Running time: 30 minutes
- Production company: Southern Star Entertainment

Original release
- Network: Nine Network
- Release: 9 July – 13 August 2001

Outriders is an Australian children's television series that first screened on the Nine Network in 2001. It was a 26 part series produced by Southern Star Entertainment.

== Episodes ==
1. Eye of the Dragon: Part 1 (airdate 9 July 2001)
2. Eye of the Dragon: Part 2 (airdate 10 July 2001)
3. Eye of the Dragon: Part 3 (airdate 11 July 2001)
4. Eye of the Dragon: Part 4 (airdate 12 July 2001)
5. Eye of the Dragon: Part 5 (airdate 13 July 2001)
6. Eye of the Dragon: Part 6 (airdate 16 July 2001)
7. Ghost of the Past: Part 1 (airdate 17 July 2001)
8. Ghost of the Past: Part 2 (airdate 18 July 2001)
9. Ghost of the Past: Part 3 (airdate 19 July 2001)
10. Ghost of the Past: Part 4 (airdate 20 July 2001)
11. Dirty Business: Part 1 (airdate 23 July 2001)
12. Dirty Business: Part 2 (airdate 24 July 2001)
13. Dirty Business: Part 3 (airdate 25 July 2001)
14. Dirty Business: Part 4 (airdate 26 July 2001)
15. Paradise Lost: Part 1 (airdate 27 July 2001)
16. Paradise Lost: Part 2 (airdate 30 July 2001)
17. Paradise Lost: Part 3 (airdate 31 July 2001)
18. Paradise Lost: Part 4 (airdate 1 August 2001)
19. Aliens: Part 1 (airdate 2 August 2001)
20. Aliens: Part 2 (airdate 3 August 2001)
21. Aliens: Part 3 (airdate 6 August 2001)
22. Aliens: Part 4 (airdate 7 August 2001)
23. Web of Lies: Part 1 (airdate 8 August 2001)
24. Web of Lies: Part 2 (airdate 9 August 2001)
25. Web of Lies: Part 3 (airdate 10 August 2001)
26. Web of Lies: Part 4 (airdate 13 August 2001)

== Cast ==
=== Main cast ===
- Abbie Cornish as Regina "Reggie" McDowell
- Oliver Ackland as Vince Frasca
- Mark Furze as Jake Konrad
- Kate Raison as Tori Konrad
- Luise Helm as Julia Kurtz
- Simon Scarlett as Shane Sullivan

=== Other cast ===
- Barry Otto as Antiques Dealer
- Bob Baines as Bruce (4 episodes, 2001)
- Christopher Pitman as Glenn Miller
- Diana Glenn as Constable Taylor (2 episodes)
- Emily Calder as The Rider
- Harold Hopkins as Hayden Simpson
- Harry Pavlidis as Madigan
- John Jarratt as Stuart
- John Sheerin as Mr. Sullivan
- Kate Beahan as Rachel
- Kellie Bright as Julia's Mother (2 episodes, 2001)
- Lenore Smith as Reggie's Mother
- Melissa Ippolito as Anissa
- Miranda Hobbs as Britney Potter
- Moya O'Sullivan as Mrs. Churchill
- Peter Sumner as Bud Sattler
- Phaedra Nicolaidis as Mel
- Robert Coleby as Jansen (2 episodes, 2001)
- Robert Mammone as Fenech
- William Haydon as Lloyd

== See also ==
- Neon Rider, a similarly themed program.
- Higher Ground, a similarly themed program.
