= Toni Scanlan =

Australian actress

- Born: 2 April 1956 (age 70); Perth, Western Australia, Australia
- Occupation: Actress

Toni Scanlan (born 2 April 1956) is an Australian actress best known for her role in the Australian television police drama Water Rats as Helen Blakemore. She is one of the only three actors to appear in the series from when it started to when it ended.

She was the winner of the Best Actress in a Lead Role at the 2007 Sydney Theatre Awards for her role in King Tide, despite her late call to the role, replacing the lead originally cast.

Scanlan received Best Actress in a Leading Role at the 2013 Sydney Theatre Awards for All My Sons by Arthur Miller at the opening of The Eternity Playhouse, Sydney.

== Other activities ==
Source:

== Filmography ==
=== Television appearances ===
Year	Title	Role	Notes
2025	NCIS: Sydney	Louise Mullins	1 episode
2023	Ten Pound Poms	Maggie Thorne	3 episodes
2015	Hiding	Hazel Sanford	2 episodes
2011	Crownies	Geraldine Ramsden	1 episode
2007	All Saints	Virginia	1 episode
2006	Answered by Fire	Robyn	TV movie
2003	The Forest	Kerry	TV movie
2002	MDA	Teresa	3 episodes
1996-01	Water Rats	Helen Blakemore	177 episodes
1995	Echo Point	Rita Brennan	2 episodes
1995	Bordertown	Itinerant Woman	1 episode
1995	Blue Heelers	Jane Roper	1 episode
1992	Six Pack	Cleo	1 episode
1991	GP	Anne Philips	1 episode
1989	Homebrew	Claire Daley	TV movie
1989	Fields of Fire III	Betty Wilson	1 episode

=== Film appearances ===
Year	Title	Role	Notes
2019	Hearts and Bones	Ada Williams	
1995	Vacant Possession (film)	Joyce	
1990	Breakaway	Hilda	
1989	Kiss the NIght	Gail	
1988	Tender Hooks	Lorraine	
1987	High Tide	Mary	
1985	The Boy who had Everything	Second prostitute	

== Theatre ==
Scanlan has appeared in numerous theatre productions.

Year	Title	Role	Notes	Ref
2024	Switzerland	Highsmith	Ensemble Theatre	
2023	The Weekend	Jude	Belvoir Street	
2022	Opening Night	Sarah	Belvoir Street	
2021	Stop Girl	Mum		
2020	The Children	Rose	Queensland Theatre Co	
2016	Dreamland	Philmomena	NORPA	
2014	Richard III	Duchess of York	Ensemble Theatre	
