= Wilde's Domain =

- Based on: idea by Marcia Hatfield
- Written by: Ted Roberts
- Directed by: Charles Tingwell
- Starring: Kit Taylor; June Salter; Lenore Smith; Steven Grives; Jeanie Drynan; Henri Szeps
- Country of origin: Australia
- Original language: English

Production
- Producer: Peter Benardos
- Running time: 72 mins
- Production company: ABC

Original release
- Release: 1982

Wilde's Domain is a 1982 Australian TV movie about a circus family.

== Cast ==
- Kit Taylor as Dan Wilde
- June Salter as Hannah Wilde
- Lenore Smith as Alex Wilde
- Tim Elliott as Andrew Wilde
- Steven Grives as Yuri Danilov
- Jeanie Drynan as Liz
- Henri Szeps as Shenko
- Alan David Lee as David Wilde
- Martin Vaughan as Tom Moore
- Ivar Kants as Curtis
- Warwick Moss as Jack
