= Crimebroker =

- Based on: A story by Sean Goodwyn and Steve Matthews
- Written by: Tony Morphett
- Directed by: Ian Barry
- Starring: Jacqueline Bisset
- Music by: Roger Mason
- Countries of origin: Australia; Japan
- Original language: English

Production
- Producers: Chris Brown; Hiroyuki Ikeda; Kazuo Nakamura; John Sexton; Andrew Warren
- Cinematography: Dan Burstall
- Editor: Nicholas Beauman
- Running time: 100 minutes
- Production companies: John Sexton Productions; Portman Productions; Sogovision
- Budget: A$2.5 million

Original release
- Network: Network Ten
- Release: 14 June 1993
- Network: TV Asahi
- Release: July 1993

Crimebroker is a 1993 Australian-Japanese television film, starring Jacqueline Bisset as a judge who moonlights as a "crime broker." It was also known as Corrupt Justice.

== Plot summary ==
Jacqueline Bisset plays a respectable Sydney housewife and magistrate who leads a double life selling expertly devised crimes. In fact, she seems to have sassed it until she falls for Japanese criminologist Masaya Kato and is drawn into a partnership with him that could be dangerous for her health.
