= Gabrielle Fitzpatrick =

Australian actress

- Born: 1 February 1967 (age 59); Brisbane, Australia
- Occupations: Actress, former model
- Years active: 1987–2017
- Spouse: Shaun Sewter (m. 10 September 2008)

Gabrielle Fitzpatrick (born 1 February 1967) is an Australian film and television actress.

== Early life ==
Fitzpatrick was born in 1 February 1966, in Brisbane, Queensland, Australia. Her background is Irish, English and German. She started her career as a model. She made her first on-screen appearance in an Outback Steakhouse television advertisement.

== Career ==
While modelling in Milan, Fitzpatrick auditioned for a modeling part in Italian film Via Monte Napoleone, directed by Carlo Vanzina, but was lucky enough to score a speaking role.

She has since starred in 11 films, including superhero film Mighty Morphin Power Rangers: The Movie (1995), Australian thriller Offspring (1996), action films Mr. Nice Guy (1997) and Inferno (1999) alongside Pat Morita and Jean-Claude Van Damme respectively. Other film credits include Clover Bend (2002) and religious film The Last Sin Eater (2007) with Henry Thomas. She has also featured in the television movies Blackwater Trail (1995) and The Magicians (2000). Her most recent film project was 2017's Fatties: Take Down the House, directed by Bob Gordon.

Fitzpatrick has also appeared in numerous television series, including regular roles as Brooke Bannister in Australian soap opera Paradise Beach (1993) and Montana Hale in Australian period drama The Man from Snowy River (1995–1996). She had recurring roles as Naomi Reynolds in American police procedural series NYPD Blue (1997–1998) and Charlotte Bentley Logan in American western drama Legacy (1999).

She has also appeared in guest roles in both Australian and American television series including E Street (1991), Police Rescue (1991), G.P. (1993), Fire (1995), Roar (1997), Frasier (1998), Nash Bridges (2000), Providence (2001), Dragnet (2003), 24 (2004), North Shore (2004) and Lost (2006/2007).

== Personal life ==
Fitzpatrick has been married to Shaun Sewter, an animation director, VFX supervisor, and motion graphics artist, since 10 September 2008. She is currently based in Los Angeles, California.

She studied advertising, marketing and brand development at UCLA from 2007 to 2010. She has worked as a consultant for Self By Self Art and as a marketing and PR assistant for Moo Studios, according to her LinkedIn profile.

== Filmography ==
=== Film ===
Year	Title	Role	Notes
1986	Via Monte Napoleone		
1995	Mighty Morphin Power Rangers: The Movie	Dulcea	
1996	Offspring	Maria Cassini	
1997	Mr. Nice Guy	Diana	
1999	Inferno	Rhonda Reynolds	
2000	Farewell, My Love	Brigit	
2001	Downward Angel	Gillian	
2001	Buck Naked Arson	Audry Gantry	
2002	Clover Bend	Nancy	
2007	The Last Sin Eater	Bletsung McLeod	
2017	Fatties: Take Down the House	Cassandra	Video, post-production

=== Television ===
Year	Title	Role	Notes
1991	E Street	Fiona	3 episodes
1991	Police Rescue	The Waitress	Episode: "Mates"
1993	G.P.	Samantha	Episode: "A Thousand Flowers: Part 2"
1993	Paradise Beach	Brooke Bannister	TV series
1995	Fire	Susan	Episode: "United We Stand"
1995	Blackwater Trail	Sandra	TV movie
1995–1996	The Man from Snowy River (aka Snowy River: The MacGregor Saga)	Montana Hale	25 episodes
1997	Roar	Vorgeen	Episode: "Projector"
1997–1998	NYPD Blue	Naomi Reynolds	10 episodes
1998	Frasier	Clare	Episode: "Where Every Bloke Knows Your Name"
1999	Legacy	Charlotte Bentley Logan	Recurring role
2000	The Magicians	Kiley	TV movie
2000	Nash Bridges	Fiona Childs	Episode: "Lap Dance"
2001	Providence	Victoria Everdeen	Episode: "Magician"
2003	Dragnet	Aunt Maria	Episode: "Well Endowed"
2004	24	Diana White	Episode: "Day 3: 5:00 a.m.-6:00 a.m."
2004	North Shore	Mrs. Farrell	Episode: "Pilot"
2006–2007	Lost	Lindsey	2 episodes: "Two for the Road", "Par Avion"
