= Back of Beyond (film) =

- Directed by: Michael Robertson
- Starring: Paul Mercurio; Dee Smart; Colin Friels; Rebekah Elmaloglou; John Polson; Bob Maza
- Release date: 1995
- Country: Australia
- Language: English
- Budget: $4.5 million
- Box office: A$49,601 (Australia)

Back of Beyond is a 1995 Australian film. According to Ozmovies, "The film was released in Sydney and Melbourne on 2nd November 1995, but quickly disappeared." It was released on VHS in Australia and laserdisc in the United States but is now very difficult to find.

== Plot ==
Reclusive mechanic, Tom McGregor operates a garage in the outback. Tom's quiet existence is disturbed by the arrival of a group of thugs, led by the psychopathic Connor, when their car breaks down. The gang, who are on the run from the law are hoping to stash some stolen diamonds, but things go pear-shaped when Connor's girlfriend Charlie becomes attracted to Tom.

== Cast ==
- Paul Mercurio as Tom McGregor
- Dee Smart as Charlie
- Colin Friels as Connor
- Rebekah Elmaloglou as Susan McGregor
- John Polson as Nick
- Bob Maza as Gilbert
- Terry Serio as Lucky Dave
- Aaron Wilton as Ned
- Amy Miller-Porter as Rosie
- Glenda Linscott as Mary Margaret
