= Minnamurra (film) =

- Directed by: Ian Barry
- Written by: Ian Barry
- Produced by: John Sexton
- Starring: Jeff Fahey; Tushka Bergen; Steven Vidler; Shane Briant
- Production companies: Burrowes Film Group; John Sexton Productions; International Film Management Limited
- Distributed by: Hemdale Film Corporation; Hemdale Ginnane Australia Limited
- Release date: 1989
- Running time: 92 mins
- Country: Australia
- Language: English
- Budget: A$7.3 million
- Box office: A$72,462 (Australia)

Minnamurra is a 1989 Australian film about a feisty woman who lives on a country property. It is also known as Outback and Wrangler.

The plot appears to have been inspired by The Squatter's Daughter. David Stratton called it "almost The Man from Snowy River III in terms of plot and character".

== Plot ==
Set in the early 1900s in outback Australia, Fahey plays the handsome, athletic businessman Ben Creed, who vies for the hand of an Australian rancher's daughter, Alice (Tushka Bergen). The plot revolves around rivalry with another suitor to whom she is initially attracted, the cattleman Jack, but also with a villainous creditor Allenby who is trying to secure the large Minamurra estate left to Alice after her father died. Saving her land, which is mortgaged to the hilt until Creed secretly takes on her debts and then falls into debt himself, involves driving 100 horses to a cargo ship for sale to Lord Kitchener to support the Boer War in South Africa. Ben and Jack are forced to collaborate to get the horses to the ship before it sails.

== Cast ==
- Jeff Fahey as Ben Creed
- Tushka Bergen as Alice May Richards
- Steven Vidler as Jack Donaghue
- Richard Moir as Bill Thompson
- Shane Briant as Allenby
- Fred Parslow as James Richards
- Cornelia Frances as Caroline Richards
- Michael Winchester as Rupert Richards
- Sandy Gore as Maude Richards
- Drew Forsythe as Henry Iverson
- Owen Weingott as General Smith
- Mic Conway as Fredie
- Wallas Eaton as Grassmore
- Peter Collingwood as Banker
- Gerry Skilton as Cookie
