= Water Rats (TV series) =

Australian television series

- Genre: Police procedural; Crime drama; Action; Thriller; Mystery
- Created by: John Hugginson; Tony Morphett
- Starring: Colin Friels; Catherine McClements; Steve Bisley; Toni Scanlan; Peter Bensley; Aaron Pedersen; Dee Smart; Jay Laga'aia
- Theme music composer: Les Gock; Song Zu
- Country of origin: Australia
- No. of seasons: 6
- No. of episodes: 177 (list of episodes)

Production
- Producers: Hal McElroy; Ted Roberts
- Production locations: Sydney; The Rocks; Goat Island; Balmain
- Running time: 42-45 minutes
- Production companies: Southern Star Productions; Nine Films and Television

Original release
- Network: Nine Network
- Release: 12 February 1996 – 7 August 2001

Water Rats is an Australian police procedural crime drama television series created by John Hugginson and Tony Morphett for the Nine Network. The series was based on the work of Sydney Water Police who fight crime around Sydney Harbour and surrounding locales. The show was set on and around Goat Island in Sydney Harbour.

Water Rats premiered on 12 February 1996, and ran for six seasons and 177 episodes. Colin Friels and Catherine McClements were the original stars of the series and were instrumental in the show's early success. They both departed the show in 1999. In later seasons, Steve Bisley, Aaron Pedersen and Dee Smart became the show's main stars.

For the sixth and final season in 2001, the show concentrated more on the cops' personal lives rather than just focusing on the crimes committed. The Nine Network cancelled the show after six seasons. Executive Producer Kris Noble blamed escalating costs for the cancellation. However, the series had been suffering a ratings decline following the departure of Friels and McClements in 1999.

The final episode was broadcast in Australia on 7 August 2001.

== Production ==
The first season of the series cost $16 million.

== Cast ==
=== Main ===
- Colin Friels as Det Snr Constable Frank Holloway (1996–1999)
- Catherine McClements as Det Snr Constable Rachel Goldstein (1996–1999)
- Steve Bisley as Det Sergeant Jack Christey (1998–2001)
- Jay Laga'aia as Snr Const Tommy Tavita (1996–2000)
- Aaron Pedersen as Det Constable Michael Reilly (1999–2001)
- Dee Smart as Det Snr Constable Alex St. Clare (2000–2001)

=== Supporting ===
- Peter Bensley as Snr Sgt/Chief Insp Jeff Hawker (1996–2001)
- Bill Young as Chief Insp Clarke Webb (1996 only)
- Brett Partridge as Snr Constable Gavin Sykes (1996–2001)
- Toni Scanlan as Snr Sgt Helen Blakemore (1996–2001)
- Scott Burgess as Snr Sgt Dave McCall (1996–1999)
- Aaron Jeffery as Constable Terry Watson (1996–1998)
- Sophie Heathcote as Constable Fiona Cassidy (1996–1997)
- Raelee Hill as Constable Tayler Johnson (1997–1999)
- Allison Cratchley as Constable Emma Woods (1998–2001)
- Diarmid Heidenreich as Constable Matthew Quinn (2000–2001)
- Rebecca Smart as Constable Donna Janevski (2000–2001)

=== Recurring ===
- Peter Mochrie as Detective Snr Sergeant John 'Knocker' Harrison (22 episodes, 1996)
- Jeremy Callaghan as Detective Snr Constable Kevin Holloway (10 episodes, 1996)
- Richard Healy as Insp Tony Brady (14 episodes, 1996–1997)
- Treffyn Koreshoff as David Goldstein (17 episodes, 1996–1999)
- John Walton as Walton and other characters (26 episodes, 1997–1999)
- Anthony Martin as Colin "Chopper" Lewis (44 episodes, 1997–2001)
- Mouche Phillips as Eva Minton (8 episodes, 2000–2001)
- Brooke Satchwell as Sophie Ferguson (20 episodes, 2000–2001)
- Joss McWilliam as Sgt Lance Rorke (29 episodes, 2000–2001)
- Kelly Dale as Senior Constable Sam Bailey (season 2, 1997)
- John Adam as Michael Jefferies (season 2, 1997)
- Anne Tenney as Gail Hawker (season 2, 5 episodes, 1997)
- Betty Lucas as Sybil Graham (1, 2006)
- Rebecca Hobbs as Liz Robinson (season 3, 1998)
- Robert Mammone as Detective Agi Fatseas (5 episodes, 2001)
- Sonia Todd as Detective Sergeant Louise Bradshaw (season 3, 13 episodes, 1998)
- Ritchie Singer as Terry Madigan (season 3, 1998)
- Roxane Wilson as Suzi Abromavich (season 3-4, 1998-99)
- Liz Burch as Gillian Swain (season 4, 5 episodes, 1999)
- Josephine Byrnes as Acting Inspector Julia Goodwin (season 6, 3 episodes, 2001)
- Bill Hunter as Tom Christey (season 6, 2001)
- Ingrid Ruz as Sergeant Vanessa Simmons (season 6, 2001)
- Rodger Corser as Detective George Newhouse (season 6, 4 episodes, 2001)
- Rohan Nichol as Shane Green (season 5, episode 2: "Reunion", 2000)
- Kelly Dingwall as Sam Bailey (9 episodes)
- Marshall Napier as Joe De Silva (5 episodes)

== Season summaries ==
=== Pilot ===
The pilot of Water Rats screened in Australia at 8.30 pm on Monday, 12 February 1996. It was entitled "Dead in the Water" and was a two-part episode, concerning a divorced man, deranged over the death of his daughter, who captures a Sydney Harbour ferry and holds the city to ransom. "Dead in the Water" introduced viewers to Detective Senior Constables Frank Holloway (Colin Friels) and Rachel Goldstein (Catherine McClements).

==== Other characters ====
- Chief Inspector Clarke Webb (played by Bill Young)
- Senior Sergeant Jeff Hawker (played by Peter Bensley)
- Sergeant Helen Blakemore (played by Toni Scanlan)
- Senior Sergeant Dave McCall (played by Scott Burgess)
- Senior Constable Gavin Sykes (played by Brett Partridge)
- Senior Constable Tommy Tavita (played by Jay Laga'aia)
- Senior Constable Fiona Cassidy (played by Sophie Heathcote)
- Senior Constable Terry Watson (played by Aaron Jeffery)
- Detective Senior Sergeant John "Knocker" Harrison (played by Peter Mochrie)
- Detective Senior Constable Kevin Holloway (played by Jeremy Callaghan)
- David Goldstein (played by Treffyn Koreshoff)
- Jonathon Goldstein (played by Steven Grives)
- Inspector Tony Brady (played by Richard Healy)
- Prison Warden (played by Christopher Barry)

=== Season one ===
Season one ran for 26 episodes.

==== Major storylines included ====
- Jonathon Goldstein (Steven Grivies) trying to deny Rachel (Catherine McClements) access to their young son, David (Treffyn Koreshoff).
- Frank's (Colin Friels)' relationship with crime scene officer, Caroline Cox.
- Helen's (Toni Scanlan)'s sexuality comes out in the open, particularly to Rachel (McClements), who seemed to be the only character who did not know Helen was gay.
- The death and subsequent investigation of Frank's brother, Kevin (Jeremy Callaghan).
- Rachel's (McClements)' relationship with Knocker (Peter Mochrie), which turned out to be a deadly one.
- Clarke's (Bill Young's) affair and his subsequent resignation.
- Frank (Friels) being investigated by Internal Affairs on two occasions.

=== Season two ===
The second season of Water Rats ran, again, for 26 episodes and began airing on Monday, 10 February 1997. Season two also took the detectives to Melbourne, a change from Sydney Harbour. It also introduced a new character, Constable Tayler Johnson (Raelee Hill), as well as a few minor ones.

==== New characters ====
- Colin "Chopper" Lewis (played by Anthony Martin)
- Senior Constable Sam Bailey (played by Kelly Dale)
- Michael Jefferies (played by John Adam)
- Gail Hawker (played by Anne Tenney)

==== Major storylines included ====
- Rachel's (McClements') relationship with the well-off Michael Jefferies (John Adam).
- Jeff (Peter Bensley) becomes Chief Inspector.
- Frank (Friels) once again, is investigated by I.A, but this time for a much more serious offence, murder.
- Tayler (Raelee Hill), is Helen's niece.
- Terry (Aaron Jeffery) is stabbed and decides to leave the Water Police.
- Dave (Scott Burgess) is speared by spear gun and cannot continue diving.
- Jeff (Peter Bensley) and his wife separate.

=== Season three ===
Season three ran for 31 episodes and premiered on Monday, 9 February 1998. A couple of episodes into the season, it was moved to Tuesday nights. Steve Bisley is also added to the opening credits for a number of episodes near the end of the season.

==== New characters included ====
- Constable Emma Woods (played by Allison Cratchley)
- Liz Robinson (played by Rebecca Hobbs)
- Detective Senior Constable Jack Christey (played by Steve Bisley)
- Detective Sergeant Louise Bradshaw (played by Sonia Todd)
- Terry Madigan (played by Ritchie Singer)

==== Major storylines included ====
- Frank (Friels) getting back together (for a while) with his ex-wife Liz (Rebecca Hobbs).
- Rachel (Catherine McClements) and tough-talking detective Jack Christey (Steve Bisley) have a one-night stand.
- Tayler (Raelee Hill) is shot.
- Rachel (McClements) works with Tommy (Jay Laga'aia) on a number of occasions, while Frank is away.
- Frank's (Friels') relationship with undercover cop Louise (Sonia Todd) ends when she is shot dead.
- Helen (Toni Scanlan) is promoted to Senior Sergeant.

=== Season four ===
The fourth series began on Tuesday, 16 February 1999 and ran for 32 episodes. It was a series of change for Water Rats, which included both Colin Friels' and Catherine McClements' departures within 18 episodes of each other.

==== New characters included ====
- Detective Senior Constable Michael Reilly (Aaron Pedersen)
- Gillian Swain (played by Liz Burch)
- Suzi Abromavich (played by Roxane Wilson, who also appeared in one episode in series three)
- Detective Senior Constable Alex St Clare (played by Dee Smart)

==== Major storylines included ====
- Helen's (Toni Scanlan's) relationship with lawyer Gillian Swain (Liz Burch).
- Michael Reilly (Aaron Pedersen), from VIP security, becomes the third detective.
- Frank (Colin Friels) leaves the Water Police, sailing to Venezuela.
- Jack (Steve Bisley) replaces Frank (Friels) and his relationship with Rachel (McClements) gets off to a rocky start.
- Jack (Bisley) is promoted to Detective Sergeant.
- David is kidnapped.
- Rachel (McClements) and Jack (Bisley) start their relationship again.
- Rachel (McClements) is stabbed, and dies in Jack's (Bisley's) arms.
- Jeff (Peter Bensley) and his wife get a divorce.
- Tayler (Raelee Hill) leaves the Water Police, joining Pol-Air.
- Alex St Clare (Dee Smart) replaces Rachel (McClements).

=== Season five ===
The fifth season began airing on Tuesday, 22 February 2000, and ran for 36 episodes, the longest out of the six seasons of the show. Ratings began to fall slightly, as a result of McClements' departure the previous year. A number of regular characters also left, including Jay Laga'aia and Scott Burgess, whose character was not seen at all in series five, and his whereabouts was finally mentioned in series six.

==== New characters included ====
- Senior Constable Matthew Quinn (played Diarmid Heidenreich)
- Constable Donna Janevski (played by Rebecca Smart)
- Sergeant Lance Rorke (played by Joss McWilliam)
- Sophie Ferguson (played by Brooke Satchwell)
- Eva Minton (played by Mouche Phillips)

==== Major storylines included ====
- Tommy (Jay Laga'aia) leaves the Water Police and goes on long-service leave.
- Jack (Bisley) finds out he has an 18-year-old daughter named Sophie (Brooke Satchwell).
- Mick asks Alex (Dee Smart) out on a date.
- Gavin (Brett Partridge) meets Eva (Mouche Phillips).
- Jack (Bisley) remembers Rachel (McClements) on the one-year anniversary of her death.

=== Season six ===
The sixth and final season of Water Rats began airing on Tuesday, 6 February 2001 and ran for 26 episodes. Sometime early in the season, the timeslot was changed from 8.30 pm to 9.30 pm. The Nine Network decided to cancel the show, due to escalating costs and declining ratings, and two main stars, Steve Bisley and Dee Smart had decided to leave the show.

==== Notable new characters included ====
- Acting Inspector Julia Goodwin (played by Josephine Byrnes)
- Tom Christey (played by Bill Hunter)
- Sergeant Vanessa Simmons (played by Ingrid Ruz)
- Detective George Newhouse (played by Rodger Corser)

==== Major storylines included ====
- Jack (Bisley) has a short relationship with Julia Goodwin (Josephine Byrnes).
- Lance (Joss McWilliam) dies in a freak accident.
- Sophie (Brooke Satchwell) begins her Police training.
- The Water Police learn that Snr. Sgt. Dave McCall (Scott Burgess) has died.
- Gavin (Brett Partridge) and Eva (Mouche Phillips) get married, and at the end of the series, have a baby.
- Jack is shot in the very last episode, and though not known, probably dies, as Bisley was leaving the show if it did continue for another season.

== Awards and nominations ==
| Year | Award | Category | Nominee(s) | Result |
|---|---|---|---|---|
| 1997 | Logie Award | Most Outstanding Actor | Colin Friels | Won |
| 1997 | Logie Award | Most Outstanding Achievement in a Drama Production | Water Rats | Won |
| 1998 | Logie Award | Most Outstanding Actor | Colin Friels | Nominated |
| 1998 | Logie Award | Most Popular Actor | Colin Friels | Nominated |
| 1998 | Logie Award | Most Popular Actress | Catherine McClements | Nominated |
| 1998 | Logie Award | Most Outstanding Actress | Catherine McClements | Won |
| 1998 | Logie Award | Most Popular Program | Water Rats | Nominated |
| 1998 | Logie Award | Most Outstanding Drama Series | Water Rats | Nominated |
| 1998 | AFI Awards | Young Actor's Award | Paul Pantano (for episode Romeo is Bleeding) | Won |
| 1999 | Logie Awards | Most Popular Actor | Colin Friels | Nominated |
| 1999 | Logie Awards | Most Outstanding Actor | Colin Friels | Nominated |
| 1999 | People's Choice Award | Favourite Actor in a Drama or Serial | Colin Friels | Won |
| 1999 | People's Choice Award | Favourite Actress in a Drama or Serial | Catherine McClements | Nominated |
| 1999 | People's Choice Award | Favourite TV Star | Colin Friels | Nominated |
| 1999 | People's Choice Award | Favourite Drama or Serial | Water Rats | Nominated |
| 1999 | AFI Award | Best Actress in a Leading Role in a Television Drama | Catherine McClements (for episode I'm Home) | Nominated |
| 1999 | Awgie Award | Television - Series | Peter Gawler (for episode Six Hundred Clear a Week) | Won |
| 2000 | Logie Award | Most Outstanding Actor in a Series | Colin Friels | Nominated |
| 2000 | Logie Award | Most Outstanding Actor in a Series | Steve Bisley | Nominated |
| 2000 | Logie Award | Most Outstanding Actress in a Series | Catherine McClements | Nominated |
| 2000 | Logie Award | Most Popular Actor | Colin Friels | Nominated |
| 2000 | Logie Award | Most Outstanding Drama Series | Water Rats | Nominated |
| 2001 | Awgie Award | Television - Series | John Banas (for episode Domino) | Won |
| 2001 | Awgie Award | Television - Series | Peter Gawler (for episode Hungry Bear Blues) | Won |
| 2001 | Logie Awards | Most Outstanding Drama Series | Water Rats | Nominated |
| 2001 | Logie Awards | Most Outstanding Actor in a Series | Steve Bisley | Nominated |

== Filming locations ==
Water Rats was filmed on and around Goat Island in Sydney Harbour. Other locations used throughout the series were:

- Shark Island
- Sydney Harbour Bridge − In the season three episode Epiphany, Matt Barnes took Rachel Goldstein and climbed the famous bridge for a negotiators exercise.
- The Gap − A main storyline of season 1 was the murder of Frank's brother Kevin, who was thrown off The Gap.
- White Bay Power Station − Used a number of times, most notably, Catherine McClements' last episode A Day at the Office.
- Fort Denison
- The Rocks − Mainly used for external shots of Frank's house.
- Middle Harbour
- Long Bay Correctional Centre
- Australian Army Artillery Museum − During the season two final, Rachel and Frank search for killer Brian Atkins in the tunnels of the museum.
- North Head
- Middle Head Fortifications
- Melbourne − In season two, Rachel and Frank travelled to Melbourne to investigate a murder.

== Fictional locations ==
The real Sydney Water Police headquarters was located at Pyrmont. The TV version of the Sydney Water Police headquarters was located on Goat Island, though the fictional address was 48/50 Harbour Drive, Sydney 2000. Other fictional locations throughout the series included:

- Frank's House − The exterior was shot in The Rocks, but the interior was a set on Goat Island.
- The Cutter Bar − A fictional pub, where the members of the Water Police liked to relax after a hard day at work (introduced in season two).
- The Sydney Police Centre − Unlike some other police stations, the Water Police did not have their own holding cells, so offenders were taken to the SPC to be charged.
- The Hospital
- The Morgue − Early in the series, real morgues were used to film in. Eventually a set was built on Goat Island.
- Rachel's house − A number of different exterior locations were used for Rachel's house, including Balmain, Birchgrove and Glebe.

== Home media ==
Water Rats was first released on DVD in 2004 through Shock Entertainment. It was released as two parts called Series 1 and Series 2, though it was actually only season 1 in two parts. Warner Vision Australia then released the rest of the show, where DVDs labelled series 3 were actually season 2 and so on. It was announced on 7 August 2017 that Via Vision Entertainment would re-release all six seasons on DVD on 22 November 2017. Several episodes are out of broadcast order in the Via Vision collection and on Amazon Prime.

=== DVDs ===
| Title | Format | No. of episodes | Discs | Region 4 (Australia) | DVD special features | DVD distributors |
|---|---|---|---|---|---|---|
| Season One | DVD | Series 1, Episodes 1-13 | 3 | 8 March 2004 | Selected Episodes Commentaries | Shock Entertainment |
| Season Two | DVD | Series 1, Episodes 14-26 | 3 | 21 February 2005 | Photo Gallery | Shock Entertainment |
| Season Three Part 1 | DVD | Series 2, Episodes 1-14 | 4 | | Photo gallery | Warner Vision Australia |
| Season Three Part 2 | DVD | Series 2, Episodes 15-26 | 3 | | None | Warner Vision Australia |
| Season Four Part 1 | DVD | Series 3, Episodes 1-17 | 4 | | None | Warner Vision Australia |
| Season Four Part 2 | DVD | Series 3, Episode 18-31 | 4 | | Photo gallery | Warner Vision Australia |
| Season Five Part 1 | DVD | Series 4, Episodes 1-16 | 4 | 9 September 2006 | None | Warner Vision Australia |
| Season Five Part 2 | DVD | Series 4, Episodes 17-32 | 4 | 9 September 2006 | Photo Gallery | Warner Vision Australia |
| Season Six Part 1 | DVD | Series 5, Episodes 1-21 | 5 | 28 October 2006 | None | Warner Vision Australia |
| Season Six Part 2 | DVD | Series 5, Episodes 22-36 | 4 | 28 October 2006 | Photo Gallery | Warner Vision Australia |
| Season Seven Part 1 | DVD | Series 6, Episodes 1-12 | 3 | 28 October 2006 | Photo Gallery | Warner Vision Australia |
| Season Seven Part 2 | DVD | Series 6, Episodes 13-26 | 4 | 28 October 2006 | None | Warner Vision Australia |
| The Complete Series 1-6 | DVD | All 177 Episodes | 45 | 22 November 2017 | Commentaries On Selected Episodes. Photo Galleries | Via Vision Entertainment |
| Water Rats: Collection One | DVD | Season 01, Episodes 1-26 Season 02, Episodes 01-26 Season 03, Episodes 01-31 Season 04, Episodes 01-32 | 24 | 11 April 2018 | Commentaries On Selected Episodes. Photo Galleries | Via Vision Entertainment |
| Water Rats: Collection Two | DVD | Season 05, Episodes 01-36 Season 06, Episodes 01-26 | 21 | 5 December 2018 | Photo Galleries | Via Vision Entertainment |
| Water Rats: The Complete Collection | DVD | All 177 Episodes | 45 | 13 September 2023 | Audio commentaries on selected episodes Photo Galleries | Via Vision Entertainment |

=== Online streaming availability ===
| Title | Format | Episodes # | Year of Airing | Streaming Status | Distributors |
|---|---|---|---|---|---|
| Water Rats Season One | Streaming | Episodes 01-26 | 2019 2020 | No longer Available Currently Streaming | 9Now 7plus |
| Water Rats Season Two | Streaming | Episodes 01-26 | 2019 2020 | No longer Available Currently Streaming | 9Now 7plus |
| Water Rats Season Three | Streaming | Episodes 01-31 | 2019 2020 | No longer Available Currently Streaming | 9Now 7plus |
| Water Rats Season Four | Streaming | Episodes 01-32 | 2019 2020 | No longer Available Currently Streaming | 9Now 7plus |
| Water Rats Season Five | Streaming | Episodes 01-36 | 2019 2020 | No longer Available Currently Streaming | 9Now 7plus |
| Water Rats Season Six | Streaming | Episodes 01-26 | 2019 2020 | No longer Available Currently Streaming | 9Now 7plus |

All episodes are available on Amazon Prime in Australia.

=== Soundtrack ===
A Water Rats soundtrack was produced by Les Gock in 1999. It contained songs featured on the series, such as "Goldie's Theme" by Cathi Ogden (heard in many episodes, most notably episode 109) and "I'll Dream of You" by Hugh Wilson (heard in Frank's final episode). It also features a couple of songs sung by cast members: "Breathe" with Raelee Hill and "Let's Party" with Jay Laga'aia. The song "Breathe" was written by James Freud, who also sang in the chorus. The company Song Zu seems to want to have no affiliation with the soundtrack music and does not recognise nor acknowledge it on its current website. Secondhand copies of it can occasionally be found on auction sites and in secondhand music stores.

== International broadcasting ==
The series is currently being re-run in:

- Australia on Foxtel's Hallmark Channel
- Ireland on RTÉ One, Sunday and Monday mornings
- Denmark on Kanal9. From 10.06.2013 on DR1
- United Kingdom on FX
- United Arab Emirates on City 7
- Ukraine on ICTV
- France on France 2
- United States on Freevee

== Notes ==
- There was a 2003 National Film and Sound Archive, Canberra exhibition on Australian police dramas (1950–present) that featured some scripts from the show, as well as a plastic corpse used in one episode. See National Archives of Australia for details.
- The exterior for Frank's house was filmed near the Agar Steps in The Rocks, New South Wales; however, the interior was shot on Goat Island.
- Catherine McClements had previously worked with Colin Friels in the movie Weekend with Kate (1990), Scott Burgess in the movie Just Us (1986) and Tony Morphett (the creator of Water Rats) in the telemovie My Brother Tom (1986).
- Season three originally contained 32 episodes; however, because of Colin Friels' illness, only 31 went to air.

== See also ==
- List of Australian television series
- List of Nine Network programs
