= Liz Burch =

Australian actress

- Born: 18 October 1954 (age 71); Sydney, New South Wales, Australia
- Occupation: Actress
- Years active: 1975–2006
- Known for: Cop Shop; The Flying Doctors

Liz Burch (born 18 October 1954) is an Australian former actress.

== Career ==
Burch is best known for her lead roles as Liz Cameron in police drama series Cop Shop from 1980 to 1982 and Dr. Chris Randall in medical drama series The Flying Doctors from 1986 to 1989, returning for an episode in 1992. She is also known for playing Kate Wallace in the Disney western drama series Five Mile Creek from 1983 to 1985. She later appeared as Candice in 2003 miniseries CrashBurn and as Jilly in Blue Water High from 2005 to 2006.

She has had recurring roles in Ocean Girl, Water Rats and Mission Top Secret, and has made numerous guest appearances in other series such as Behind the Legend, Spring & Fall, A Country Practice, Chances, G.P., Paradise Beach, Home and Away, Wildside, All Saints and Above the Law.

Burch has also presented an episode of children's show Play School.

== Personal life ==
Burch's sister Rosemary unexpectedly died from scleroderma, a rare skin disease. On a break from filming The Flying Doctors, Burch flew to London to join her costar Andrew McFarlane, so he could be a comfort during her grief.

Burch has had a knee replacement operation in her later years.

== Filmography ==
=== Film ===
Title	Year	Role	Type
1995	Tunnel Vision	Mrs. Leyton	Feature film
1996	Roses	Rose	Film short

=== Television ===
Year	Title	Role	Type
1975	Behind the Legend	Mary	Season 3, episode: "Annette Kellerman"
1980–1982	Cop Shop	Liz Cameron	129 episodes
1982	Spring & Fall	Brenda	Season 2, episode 3: "Jimmy Dancer"
1983	A Country Practice	Meredith Buckley	Season 3, 2 episodes: "See Ya: Parts 1 & 2"
1983–1985	Five Mile Creek	Kate Wallace	39 episodes
1986–1989; 1992	The Flying Doctors	Dr. Chris Randall	146 episodes
1988	Play School	Guest Presenter	1 episode
1991	Chances	Sally Kirk	Episode 73: "The Root of All Evil"
1991	Celebrity Family Feud	Contestant	1 episode
1992	The Main Event	Contestant	1 episode
1992; 1995	G.P.	Sally Ricketson / Leonie Milton	2 episodes: "Strictly Confidential", "Keeping Up With Yesterday"
1993	Paradise Beach	Fiona McDermott	TV pilot / film
1995	Mission Top Secret	Mrs. Fowler	Season 2, 4 episodes
1996	Home and Away	Maureen Richards	2 episodes: "1.1914", "1.1915"
1996	Water Rats	Susan Webb / Gillian Swain	Season 1 & 4, 6 episodes
1996–1997	Ocean Girl	Dr. Dianne Bates	Season 3-4, 6 episodes
1999	Wildside	Cynthia Holbeck	2 episodes: "2.9", "2.16"
1999–2000	All Saints	Di Richards	Season 2-3, 3 episodes: "Lost and Found", "Valley of the Shadow: Parts 1 & 2"
2000	Above the Law	Claire Waterford	Episode: "The Devil You Don't Know"
2003	CrashBurn	Candice	13 episodes
2005–2006	Blue Water High	Jilly	Season 1-2, 46 episodes

== Stage ==
Title	Year	Role	Type
1977	Something’s Afoot	Hope Langdon	Twelfth Night Theatre, Brisbane
1977	The Season at Sarsaparilla	Judy Pogson	Twelfth Night Theatre, Brisbane
1981	Habeas Corpus	Felicity Rumpers	Playhouse, Adelaide, Canberra Theatre, Victorian regional tour, Theatre Royal, Hobart, Princess Theatre, Melbourne
1990; 1994	Steaming	Nancy	Comedy Theatre, Melbourne, Mercury Theatre, Auckland
1990	Lend Me a Tenor	Maggie	His Majesty's Theatre, Perth, Theatre Royal, Sydney, Lyric Theatre, Brisbane, Canberra Theatre
1992	Caravan		Regal Theatre, Perth
1993	A Bedfull of Foreigners		West End Rialto, Brisbane, Seymour Centre, Sydney, Playhouse, Adelaide
1996	Money and Friends		Ensemble Theatre, Sydney, University of Sydney
