= Above the Law (TV series) =

- Genre: Drama
- Created by: Tony Morphett; Inga Hunter
- Written by: Tony Morphett; John Banas; John O'Brien; Louise Crane; David Phillips
- Country of origin: Australia
- Original language: English
- No. of seasons: 2
- No. of episodes: 35 (5 unaired)

Production
- Executive producers: Hal McElroy; Di McElroy
- Producers: Hal McElroy; Rocky Bester

Original release
- Network: Network Ten
- Release: 1 February – 16 August 2000

Above the Law is an Australian crime drama television series broadcast on Network Ten from February to August 2000.

The show centered around The Metro, an apartment complex with a cafe and community police station on the ground floor, and a penthouse owned by the recently jailed criminal "Vegas" Pete Murray.

The show was cancelled after 30 episodes, with 5 left unaired.

== Cast ==
=== Main characters ===
- Alyssa-Jane Cook as Olivia Murray, the Amanda Woodward-esque daughter of corrupt businessman Pete Murray
- Scott Burgess as Bill Peterson, Pete Murray's right-hand man
- Bridie Carter as Debbie Curtis, senior constable at the community police station
- Jolyon James as Con Stavros, constable at the community police station
- Ingrid Ruz as Vicki Giovanelli, paramedic
- Nicholas Bishop as Matt Bridges, runs the Italian café Us2u
- Kristy Wright as Belinda Clark, aspiring model, waitress at the café
- Teo Gebert as Skeez Giovanelli, DJ, Vicki's brother

=== Guests ===
- Vic Rooney as 'Vegas' Pete Murray
- Meme Thorne as Sunny Rodriguez, Pete Murray's housekeeper
- Tim McGunn as Sean Reilly, Vicki's married co-worker and lover
- Tamsin Carroll as Narelle Reilly
- Caroline Brazier as Carla Benning
- Ditch Davey as Chris Clark, Belinda's cousin
- Helen Scott
- Imogen Annesley as Anna King, Matt's ex
- John Adam as DS John Morgan
- Lara Cox as Caitlin, Skeez's friend
- Liz Burch as Claire Waterford
- Lois Ramsay as Flo Price
- Mercia Deane-Johns as Joan Bartlett
- Scott McRae as Michael Curtis, Debbie's gay brother
- Murray Bartlett as Nathan Peters, Michael's partner
- Sarah Aubrey as Mary Stafford
- Mark Ferguson as Annie/Andie, trans character who dates Con

== Episodes ==
=== Series one ===
No. overall	No. in season	Title	Original release date
1	1	"A Princess in a Tower"	1 February 2000
2	2	"That's Bear Talk for Broken Hearted"	1 February 2000
3	3	"Zoomboom"	8 February 2000
Olivia confronts her father in jail. Belinda's stalker closes in. Vicki's love life takes a turn for the better and Con becomes the target for a ruthless assault.
4	4	"Snapshots and Cottontails"	15 February 2000
Belinda's worst nightmare is about to come true. Debbie finds an unwanted intruder in her bed and the attraction seems mutual for Matt and Olivia.
5	5	"Send in the Clown"	22 February 2000
Olivia takes charge of her father's business, but soon realises there'll be a heavy price to pay. Debbie's ex-husband has unfinished business with her and Con has strong feelings for Belinda.
6	6	"Behold a Pale Horse"	29 February 2000
Olivia's decision to sell her father's stables could be her biggest mistake yet. Belinda confronts her demons and Con's love life takes a turn for the better.
7	7	"Wiser Counsel"	7 March 2000
Olivia makes a final decision about her father's stables. Difficulties handling the aftermath continue for Belinda and Con takes matters in hand.
8	8	"Sweet Rides"	14 March 2000
Olivia's decision may put Pete's life in danger. Vicki becomes the main suspect for Sean's Murder and Belinda is rapidly reaching breaking point.
9	9	"Little Acts of Kindness"	21 March 2000
A serial killer may be at large when bodies are discovered in the park. Con pursues the unknown assailant. Belinda goes to London to recover from the traumas of the last few months. Vicki attends Sean Rielly’s funeral and Olivia and Bill are at odds with each other after a threatening visit.
10	10	"Chaos Theory"	28 March 2000
The day of reckoning is coming for Vicki as she realises she may be charged with the murder of Sean.
11	11	"Full Disclosure"	4 April 2000
Olivia overhauls Pete's business accounts; Matt is not coping with the combination of Skez and Kenworth; and Debbie and Con investigate a series of thefts.
12	12	"Special Services"	11 April 2000
Bill employs Stan the Fingers to go over Joan Bartlett's books when he realises that she has been siphoning profits into a business on the side. Vicki introduces Josip to the gang and Debbie's hangover gets worse.
13	13	"Happy Families"	18 April 2000
Con has a hot date lined up with Annie and Matt gets jealous. Vicki is worried after Skeez goes missing. She tracks him down at the rave club, where he tells her he wants nothing more to do with her. When Sunny mentions to Bill she is having problems with her twin daughters, he takes it upon himself to lecture the twins which triggers a runaway situation. Bill finally tracks Isobel down, however Teresa is still missing. Debbie's brother Michael, whose parents do not know he is gay, decides it is time to come out and Debbie worries about the repercussions.
14	14	"Backlash"	25 April 2000
Sunny's daughter Isobel recounts the horror of being kidnapped and is ashamed she was not able to rescue her twin sister Teresa. Bill guesses Forbes and Joan Bartlett kidnapped the girls in retaliation for closing down their pornography racket. Meanwhile, Debbie's life takes an interesting turn with the arrival of a handsome journalist, Jack Glover, who is writing a story about community policing for a local rag.
15	15	"Lives of the Party"	2 May 2000
16	16	"Motherlove"	2 May 2000
17	17	"Girl's Day In"	9 May 2000
18	18	"Daddy's Girl"	16 May 2000
19	19	"Redline"	23 May 2000
20	20	"Friendship First"	6 June 2000
21	21	"A Day, a Life"	13 June 2000
22	22	"Learning Curve"	27 June 2000

=== Series two ===
No. overall	No. in season	Title	Original release date
23	1	"Grave Matters"	4 July 2000
24	2	"The Devil You Don't Know"	11 July 2000
25	3	"Flatline Fever"	18 July 2000
26	4	"Moving on Up"	25 July 2000
27	5	"Guilty as Charged"	1 August 2000
28	6	"A Hard Day's Night"	8 August 2000
29	7	"Related Pressures"	15 August 2000
30	8	"By the Book"	22 August 2000
31	9	"Every Dog Has His Day"	unaired
32	10	"He's Back"	unaired
33	11	"The Heat is On"	unaired
34	12	"Tough Love"	unaired
35	13	"Lack of Trust"	unaired

== Reception ==
In 2020, Fiona Byrne of the Herald Sun included Above the Law in her feature about "long forgotten Australian TV dramas that made viewers switch off." Byrne quipped "Above The Law wanted to be Melrose Place on top of a police station, but it wasn't." She said that the network thought the show would attract the "18–39 audience" but it "missed that mark" and did not gain older viewers either. She added "It was a highly promoted misfire; a case of lots of hype but little love from viewers."

== See also ==
- List of Australian television series
