= The Flying Doctors =

Australian 1988–1996 television series

- Title card used from Season 4
- Genre: Medical drama
- Starring: Andrew McFarlane; Liz Burch; Lenore Smith; Robert Grubb
- Theme music composer: Garry McDonald and Laurie Stone
- Country of origin: Australia
- Original language: English
- No. of seasons: 9 (10 including R.F.D.S.)
- No. of episodes: 3 (miniseries); 221 (regular series, 234 including R.F.D.S.) (list of episodes)

Production
- Production location: Australia
- Running time: 45 minutes
- Production company: Crawford Productions
- Budget: $3 million (mini-series)

Original release
- Network: Nine Network
- Release: 26 May 1986 – 6 October 1992

The Flying Doctors is an Australian television medical drama first broadcast on 26 May 1986 on the Nine Network. The series was produced by Crawford Productions. Set in the fictitious outback town Coopers Crossing, the show revolves around the everyday lifesaving efforts of the Royal Flying Doctor Service, starring Andrew McFarlane as Dr. Tom Callaghan, Liz Burch as Dr. Chris Randall, Lenore Smith as Nurse Kate Wellings, and Robert Grubb as Dr. Geoff Standish. The series' episodes were mostly self-contained medical dramas, but also explored social issues, such as domestic violence, alcohol abuse, and the struggles faced by Indigenous Australians.

The series is based on a three-part miniseries that aired in April 1985. It originally ran for over seven years. Several early online episode listings split the 221 episodes into six seasons, however the National Film and Sound Archive confirms nine. Crawford Productions have released the show in DVD and on streaming in ten seasons (including the 13 episodes of the 1992 spin-off R.F.D.S.).

== History ==
The Flying Doctors started out with a three-part miniseries broadcast on the Nine Network on 29 April 1985. It starred Andrew McFarlane as Dr. Tom Callaghan and Lorna Patterson as Liz Drever. Following the success of the miniseries, Crawford Productions and the Nine Network entered into discussions about creating "an extended series". A 26-hour series was soon commissioned. It was a co-production between Nine and Regional Television Australia, a first in Australian television, because of high production costs. Production on the first series began in August 1985 and finished in September 1986. The show was filmed in studios in Port Melbourne and on location in Minyip, which stands in for the fictional town of Coopers Crossing. All the episodes were shot on film. Other filming locations included: Nulla Station, New South Wales, Cranbourne (Royal Botanic Gardens Cranbourne), Pearcedale, Broken Hill, Lancefield, Victoria, and RAAF Base Point Cook. Several cast members from the miniseries returned, including McFarlane, Lenore Smith (Nurse Kate Wellings), Maurie Fields (Vic Buckley), Val Jellay (Nancy Buckley), Max Cullen (Horace "Hurtle" Morrison), Gil Tucker (Joe Forrest), and Mark Little (Ron Miller). New cast members included Liz Burch as Dr. Chris Randall, Lewis Fitz-Gerald as pilot David Gibson, and Kylie Belling as Sharon Herbert.

In January 1986, McFarlane announced his departure from The Flying Doctors after fulfilling his six-month contract. He admitted that he did not want to tie himself to one series and six months was all he planned to do. McFarlane filmed his final episode in June and it aired in September. Producers cast Robert Grubb in his first major television role as Dr. Geoffrey Standish. Shortly after he started filming, the crew went on strike for two weeks. Grubb made his first appearance in "Return of the Hero", which was broadcast on 15 September 1986. The episode also marked the first time an Australian drama had tackled the subject of AIDS. In the first series finale, Fitz-Gerald departed The Flying Doctors with his character being killed-off.

The positive reaction to the first series and high ratings led to a further 26 episode series being commissioned. The show also prompted around 200 real life doctors to apply for positions with the Royal Flying Doctor Service. Following the departure of Fitz-Gerald, other actors not returning for the second series were Belling, Tucker, John Frawley (Dr. Frank Turner), and Carmel Millhouse (Matron Ingrid Fischer). Peter O'Brien joined the cast as pilot Sam Patterson not long after he left his role of Shane Ramsay in Neighbours. His character became a love interest for Rebecca Gibney's mechanic Emma Plimpton. Scriptwriters decided to soften the character for the second series as Gibney grew in confidence as an actor. Comedian George Kapiniaris also joined as new radio operator Demetrios "DJ" Goannides. The series continued to feature guest appearances, with John Wood, then known for his lead role in Rafferty's Rules, starring in the opening episode of the second series.

Brett Climo made his debut as Dr. David Ratcliffe during the fifth series in May 1989, while O'Brien left the cast in June. Gibney opted to stay with the show despite the departure of her on-screen husband, but she filmed a lead role in miniseries Come in Spinner during the production break. Alex Papps was introduced as mechanic Nick Cardaci shortly after leaving his regular role in Home and Away. McFarlane also reprised his role of Dr. Tom Callaghan in August. That same year, The Flying Doctors began focusing on self-contained dramas similar to A Country Practice rather than long storylines running over weeks. A major overhaul of the cast also took place ahead of the sixth series, with Bruce Barry (George Baxter), Terry Gill (Sgt Jack Carruthers) and Vikki Blanche (Paula Patterson) departing. Meanwhile, Burch was only contracted for the first six episodes, but it was confirmed that her character would not be killed-off. She later returned for a reunion episode in the ninth series, along with McFarlane, Gibney, Barry, Gill and Kapiniaris. The 200th episode also aired as part of Series 9 in July 1991.

== Cast and characters ==
Main cast members

The following characters are credited as "starring" in the opening credits:

- Andrew McFarlane as Tom Callaghan (series 1, 5–7, episodes 1–16, 113–156; guest series 9, episode 201)

A young doctor who takes over the R.F.D.S base in Coopers Crossing after proving himself to its original boss, Harry Sinclair. Tom leaves the show after 16 episodes, to volunteer for World Vision in Africa. He returns midway through series five, before leaving again early into series seven, although he remained in the opening credits for the rest of the year. Tom makes a final appearance in series nine, when there is a town celebration in Coopers Crossing.

- Liz Burch as Chris Randall (series 1–6, episodes 1–146; guest series 9, episode 201)

A doctor who accompanies Tom Callaghan to run the R.F.D.S base in Cooper Crossing. When Tom leaves for Africa, she decides to stay in Coopers Crossing, remaining until the end of series six, when she moves to Melbourne to take care of her sick father. She returns in series nine for the town celebration, and falls in love with Tom Callaghan again, deciding to join him in Africa.

- Robert Grubb as Geoff Standish (series 1–9, episodes 17–221)

The doctor who takes over the R.F.D.S base from Tom Callaghan. Geoff is one of the longest-running characters in the series, and stayed until its finale. His relationship with Nurse Kate Wellings was a key storyline, they share a daughter by the end of the series.

- Lenore Smith as Nurse Kate Wellings Standish (series 2–9, episodes 27–221; supporting series 1, episodes 1–26)

Nurse and the only medical staff who stayed through the entire show, as a supporting cast member in the miniseries and first series, before joining the main cast from series two. She eventually begins a romance with Dr. Standish.

- Peter O'Brien as Sam Patterson (series 2–5, episodes 27–118)

Pilot, he makes his first appearance in series two, as a replacement for Gibbo.

- Brett Climo as David Ratcliffe (series 5–8, episodes 101–171)

A young doctor who joins the staff in series five and stays until the first five episodes of series eight, when he decides to leave to do something else with his life. However, his final rescue mission goes terribly wrong and he dies after falling off a cliff.

- Nikki Coghill as Nurse Jackie Crane (series 8–9, episodes 167–221)
- David Reyne as Dr. Guy Reid (series 8–9, episodes 167–221)

A charming womaniser who arrives in series eight and soon begins a relationship with the nurse Jackie Crane.

- Christopher Stollery as Johnno Johnson (series 8–9, episodes 167–221; supporting series 7, episodes 147–166)
- Sarah Chadwick as Dr. Rowie Lang (series 8–9, episodes 175–221)

Supporting cast members

The following characters appear regularly and are credited in the closing credits alongside the guest actors:

- Pat Evison as Violet Carnegie (miniseries, series 1–3), local store owner and town gossip
- Max Cullen as Horace "Hurtle" Morrison (miniseries, series 1–3), local mechanic
- Gil Tucker as Joe Forrest (miniseries, series 1), radio operator
- Bruce Barry as George Baxter (miniseries, series 1–5), local property tycoon
- Maurie Fields as Vic Buckley (miniseries, series 1–9), local pub owner, later carried over to the spin-off RFDS
- Val Jellay as Nancy Buckley (miniseries, series 1–9), Vic's wife, later carried over to the spin-off RFDS
- Mark Little as Ron Miller "the Roughneck" (miniseries, series 1), works for Hurtle
- John Frawley as Dr. Frank Turner (miniseries, series 1), runs the local hospital
- Carmel Millhouse as Matron Ingrid Fischer (miniseries, series 1)
- Terry Gill as Sgt. Jack Carruthers (miniseries, series 1–6), local police officer
- Kylie Belling as Sharon Herbert (series 1), Aboriginal receptionist at the base
- Brian Mannix as Lionel (series 1), local eccentric who renames himself "Max" after Mad Max
- Rebecca Gibney as Emma Patterson (series 1–5), Hurtle's niece, later Sam's wife
- Lewis Fitz-Gerald as David "Gibbo" Gibson (series 1), pilot who dies as result of a plane crash
- Sydney Jackson as Father Cliff "Jack" Jackson (series 2; guest season 1)
- George Kapiniaris as Demetrios "DJ" Goannides (series 2–6), radio operator
- Michaela Abay as Zoe Buchannan (series 2), teenager who Chris takes under her wing
- Mark Neal as Marty Jarvis (series 3–4), DJ's friend, troublemaker, mechanic
- Anita Cerdic as Soula Polites (series 3; guest series 2), DJ's love interest
- Shane Withington as Mike Lancaster (series 3), married geophysicist, Chris' love interest
- Marie Redshaw as Maggie Hutton (series 3–4), takes over Violet's shop
- Simon Thorpe as Senior Constable Larry O'Connor (series 3)
- Vikki Blanche as Paula Patterson (series 3–5), Sam's sister, nurse
- Gerard Kennedy as Luke Mitchell (series 4–6), works at Vic's pub
- Alex Papps as Nick Cardaci (series 5–7), mechanic
- Tammy MacIntosh as Annie Rogers (series 6–7), nurse
- Justin Gaffney as Gerry O'Neill (series 6), pilot
- Beverly Dunn as Clare Bryant (series 6–9), radio operator
- Melita Jurisic as Dr. Magda Heller (series 7–8), young doctor from Germany
- Sophie Lee as Penny Willings (series 8–9), Kate's sister, later carried over to the spin-off RFDS
- Paul Kelman as Steve MacCauley (series 8–9), mechanic

=== Call signs ===
One prominent feature in the show is the communication between the aircraft and the base station in Cooper's Crossing. Their designations are spelled out using the International Civil Aviation/ICAO phonetic alphabet.

- MSF, or Mike Sierra Foxtrot, is the aircraft, a GAF Nomad carrying registration VH-MSF (This was the Registration assigned to the GAF N24B at the time of the Certificate of Airworthiness was issued by the Civil Aviation Authority, Previously Dept. of Civil Aviation/DCA, now Civil Aviation Safety Authority/CASA. The Registration was not picked because of Doctors Without Borders French Name.

Cooper’s Crossing RFDS Base’s VCC/“Victor Charlie Charlie” call sign is issued by the Communications Authority for all Citizen’s Band/CB and usually Amateur Radio/HAM & UHF radio operators licences. All properties in country/outback are equipped with these types of radios for communication.

== Episodes ==
Series	Episodes	Originally released	
Series	Episodes	First released	Last released
Miniseries	3	29 April 1985	1 May 1985
1	26	26 May 1986	17 November 1986
2	24	9 July 1987	25 February 1988
3	26	3 March 1988	1 September 1988
4	24	8 September 1988	11 May 1989
5	26	18 May 1989	16 November 1989
6	20	8 February 1990	28 June 1990
7	20	5 July 1990	21 November 1990
8	26	24 January 1991	25 July 1991
9	29	1 August 1991	6 October 1992

== R.F.D.S. ==
By 1993, the ratings were in decline, and few original characters remained in the much-changed cast. The show was then revamped under the title R.F.D.S. (working title: The New Flying Doctors), and its setting was changed to Broken Hill. The only original cast members that were retained in the show were supporting cast members Maurie Fields and Val Jellay as Vic and Nancy Buckley, along with Sophie Lee as Penny Wellings. The storyline had the Buckleys move from Cooper's Crossing pub to Broken Hill.

The spin-off aired on the Nine Network from 21 January 1993 to 4 February 1994. It lasted just one season in this new incarnation.

Australian pay-TV channel Fox Classics secured the rights to the program from 3 July 2006. Streaming services include the spin-off as the tenth season of The Flying Doctors.

The show is not to be confused with the series RFDS, which shares the same premise but was produced by Endemol Shine Australia and aired on Seven Network from 2021.

=== Cast and characters ===
==== Main characters ====
- Steve Jacobs as Dr. Jim Solomon
- Belinda Davey as Laura Regan, Jim's wife, magistrate and coroner
- Lewis Fitz-Gerald as Dr. Sebert Blitho
- Elaine Smith as Dr. Sissy Wetherall
- Peter Phelps as Sr. Dennis Taylor
- Maurie Fields as Vic Buckley
- Val Jellay as Nancy Buckley

==== Supporting characters ====
- Simone Buchanan as Rebecca Owens
- Lydia Miller as Leanne Cassidy, radio operator
- Kevin J. Wilson as Ted Eastman, pilot
- Sophie Lee as Penny Wellings
- Justin Connor as Rollerblades
- Simon Grey as Jesse Solomon, Jim's son
- Marieke Hardy as Zoe Solomon, Laura's daughter

== Broadcasting ==
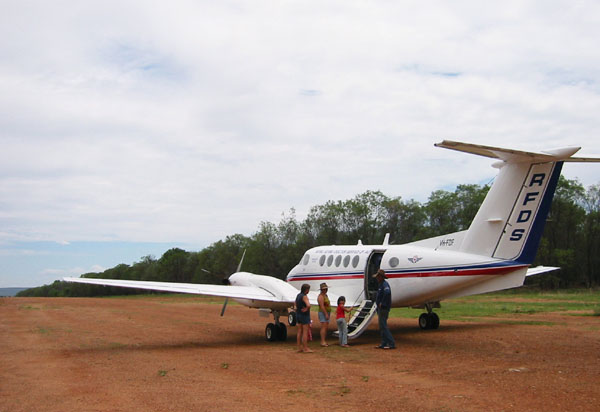
An RFDS Beechcraft Super King Air on a remote airstrip in Queensland, Australia.

In Australia, The Flying Doctors initially aired on the Nine Network and regional stations on a Monday at 7:30 pm. From the second series, the show moved to Thursdays opposite Raffety's Rules on Seven Network. In Series 7, beginning on 15 August 1990, The Flying Doctors began airing on Wednesdays, before moving back to the Thursday slot for Series 8 and 9.

In the United Kingdom, the original 1985 three-part miniseries was aired over three days on Channel 4 starting on 1 October 1985. The Flying Doctors series was broadcast on BBC One. The series initially aired on Fridays at 8:10 pm from 1 July 1988. On 20 August 1988, the series was moved to a Saturday early evening slot at 5:55 pm, where it gained a loyal audience of about 6 to 8 million viewers, until 24 August 1991. During the summer of 1992, episodes were repeated Monday to Friday at 11:05 am, around 8 weeks worth. From September 1992, the series settled into a new regular Friday afternoon slot, usually at around 2:30 pm. The BBC completed Series 8 in December 1994 before repeating series 6 and 7 in 1995. The BBC concluded the Series 9 on 18 April 1996 but then continued to air repeats in various slots until January 1997.

The Flying Doctors was also broadcast on the satellite and cable channel UK Gold. The channel repeated all 221 episodes weekdays at 15:00 from 1998.

The Flying Doctors briefly returned to free to air when WIN Television, parent company of Crawford Productions commenced reruns of the program on 17 August 2007 at midday week day afternoons.

The series was also aired in some parts of Europe and was particularly popular in the Netherlands where it aired on VARA at 8pm on Saturday nights from 1987 to 1993. The series aired in Ireland on RTÉ One from 1988 to 1996. The series aired in Germany in the early 90s on state broadcaster ZDF. The series aired originally in Sweden and has been re-broadcast on TV4 Guld in 2017 with back to back episodes on weekdays.

The show also aired in Japan and in New Zealand on TVNZ.

From 1988 to 1992, it was broadcast in Nigeria by the Nigerian Television Authority (NTA) Channel 5.

The Flying Doctors: The Inside Story was written by Australian journalist James Oram

=== Home media ===
The Flying Doctors was made available to purchase on DVD in Australia. All 221 episodes, plus the 13 spinoff-episodes are on a 51 disc set, complete with cast interviews, episode synopses and stills gallery. In region 2, Mediumrare Entertainment have released all nine seasons of The Flying Doctors including the miniseries also called The Flying Doctors.

Journalist and writer James Oram wrote a companion book to the show. Titled The Flying Doctors: The Inside Story, the book touches on the real Royal Flying Doctor Service and goes behind the scenes of the television series.

== Accolades ==
Award	Year	Category	Recipient(s)	Result	Ref(s)
Golden Televizier-Ring Gala	1992	Silver Televizier-Tulip	The Flying Doctors	Won	
Logie Award	1988	Gold Logie	Peter O'Brien	Nominated	
Logie Award	1988	Most Popular Actor	Peter O'Brien	Nominated	
Logie Award	1988	Most Popular Actress	Rebecca Gibney	Nominated	
Logie Award	1988	Most Popular Drama	The Flying Doctors	Nominated	
Logie Award	1990	Most Popular Actor	Andrew McFarlane	Nominated	
Logie Award	1990	Most Popular Series	The Flying Doctors	Nominated	
Logie Award	1991	Most Popular Actress	Lenore Smith	Nominated	
Logie Award	1992	Most Popular Series	The Flying Doctors	Nominated	
Penguin Award	1986	Sustained Performance by an Actor in a Principal/Supporting Role in a Series/Serial	Mark Little	Won	
Penguin Award	1986	Performance by an Actor in a Series	Max Cullen	Won	
Penguin Award	1987	Performance By a Male Actor in a Series/Serial	Gerard Kennedy	Won	
Penguin Award	1988	Best Actress in a Serial	Lenore Smith	Won	
Penguin Award	1989	Best Drama Series	The Flying Doctors	Won	

== See also ==
- List of The Flying Doctors episodes
- List of Australian television series
- List of Nine Network programs
- RFDS
