= Lenore Smith =

Australian actress

- Born: 25 October 1958 (age 67); Sydney, Australia
- Occupation: Actress
- Known for: The Flying Doctors

Lenore Smith (born 25 October 1958) is an Australian actress best known for her work in television. Internationally, she is best known for her role as Kate Wellings in the drama series The Flying Doctors.

== Career ==
Smith studied economics as a teenager, but after being dissuaded by a teacher, she decided to take a course at Ensemble Studios in Sydney and become an actress. After being there for just over two years, Smith landed her first role in The Restless Years as Diane Archer. Smith left Australia after The Restless Years to work in London, but received a telegram asking her to return to play a role in The Flying Doctors. Smith accepted and came back to Australia to begin work on the TV series.

Lenore embarked on higher education later in life after a long and successful career as an actor in television, stage and screen. Lenore graduated with a Bachelor of Podiatry degree, 1st Class Honours, at Central Queensland University. Lenore is a member of the Australian Podiatry Association.

== Personal life ==
Lenore dated actor Patrick Ward and the late George Negus before marrying actor Gary Sweet in 1981.

She then married actor and writer Matt Kay in 1985, but they divorced in 1992. They met while a bomb alarm was going off during the stage musical Cats.

Smith married former E Street actor Warren Jones on 19 October 1997.

== Filmography ==
=== Film ===
Year	Title	Role	Type
1982	Wilde's Domain	Alex Wilde	TV film
1999	Somewhere In The Darkness	Shamus' Mum	Feature film
2001	The Man Who Sued God	Reporter	Feature film

=== Television ===
Year	Title	Role	Type
1978–1980	The Restless Years	Diane Archer	TV series, 28 episodes
1980	Kingswood Country	Cathy	TV series, 1 episode: "Divorce Bullpitt Style"
1981	Cop Shop	Sharon Jackson	TV series, 1 episode
1982	The Sullivans	April	TV series, 2 episodes
1985	The Flying Doctors	Kate Wellings	Miniseries, 3 episodes
1986–1992	The Flying Doctors	Kate Wellings Standish	TV series, 221 episodes
1990	Driving Force '90: Down Under	Herself	TV special
1994; 1996	G.P.	Liz Browning	TV series, 2 episodes
1997	Spellbinder: Land of the Dragon Lord	Vicky	TV series, 26 episodes
2001	Outriders	Reggie's Mother	TV series, 4 episodes: "Paradise Lost: Part 2", "Aliens: Parts 2–4"
2002	Farscape	Lt. Darinta Larell	TV series, 2 episodes: "Into the Lion's Den: Parts 1 & 2"

== Theatre ==
Year	Title	Role	Type
1980	The Robin Hood Show		Kirribilli Pub Theatre
1981	Whose Life Is It Anyway?		Australian Elizabethan Theatre Trust
1982	Crimes of the Heart		Russell Street Theatre with MTC
1993	Talley's Folly	Sally Talley	Les Currie Entertainment
1995	Emerald City		Ensemble Theatre
1998	The Perfectionist	Barbara Gunn	Eureka Theatre Company
2010	Brooklyn Boy	Nina, Eric's wife	Ensemble Theatre, Sydney
2012	When Dad Married Fury	Sue	Metcalfe Theatre, Perth
2016	The Good Doctor	Various characters	Glen Street Theatre with Ensemble Theatre
