= Offspring (1996 film) =

- Directed by: Richard Ryan
- Written by: Richard Ryan
- Produced by: Phillip Emanuel executive David Hannay
- Starring: Chantal Contouri; Robert Mammone; Gabrielle Fitzpatrick
- Production company: Phillip Emanuel Productions
- Release date: 1996
- Country: Australia
- Language: English

Offspring is an Australian thriller about Rosa Cassini, a woman (Chantal Contouri), who becomes obsessed with her daughter Maria (Gabrielle Fitzpatrick), and her daughter's newfound love Ben King (Robert Mammone). For her part Maria is unwilling to rekindle her relationship with her mother following an abusive past. Rosa however holds other dark secrets, and a surprise for Maria and Ben.

== Cast ==
- Chantal Contouri as Rosa Cassini
- Gabrielle Fitzpatrick as Maria Cassini
- Robert Mammone as Ben King / Carlo
