= Ian Barry (director) =

Australian director of film and TV

- Born: 1946; Sydney, Australia
- Occupations: Film director, Television director

Ian Barry (born 1946) is an Australian director of film and TV.

== Select credits ==
- Waiting for Lucas (1973) (short)
- The Chain Reaction (1980)
- Whose Baby? (1986) (mini-series)
- Minnamurra (1989)
- Bodysurfer (1989) (mini-series)
- Ring of Scorpio (1990) (mini-series)
- Crimebroker (1993)
- Joey (1997)
- Inferno (1998) (TV movie)
- Miss Lettie and Me (2002) (TV movie)
- Not Quite Hollywood: The Wild, Untold Story of Ozploitation! (2008) (documentary)
- The Doctor Blake Mysteries (2013)
