= Claudia Karvan =

Australian actress (born 1972)

Claudia Karvan OAM
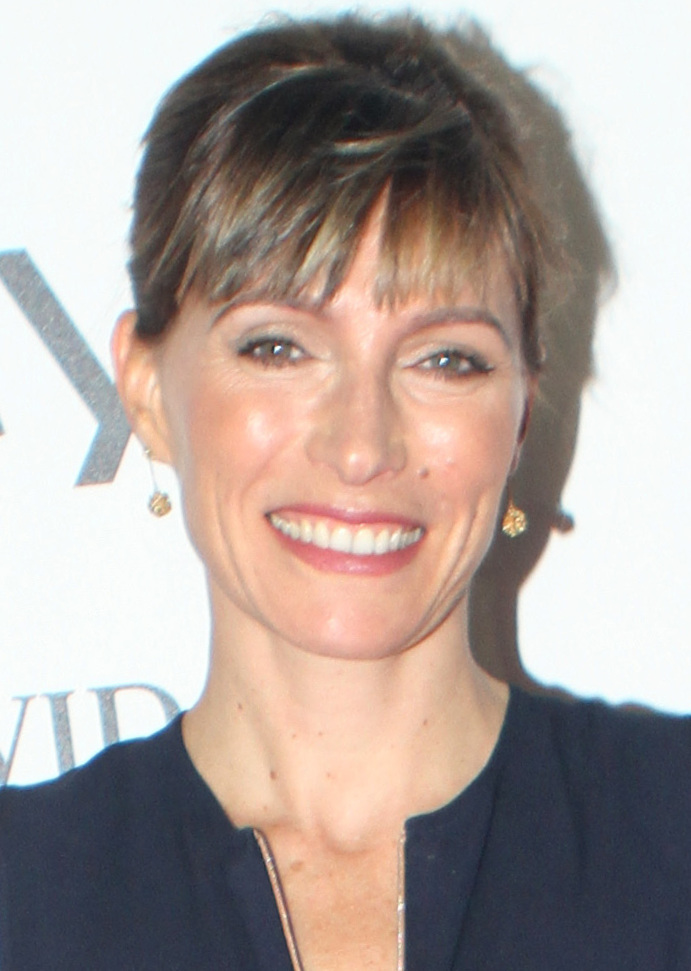
- Karvan at Woman of Style Awards, Red Carpet, May 2015
- Born: 19 May 1972 (age 54); Sydney, Australia
- Education: SCEGGS
- Occupations: Actress; producer
- Years active: 1983–present
- Known for: The Secret Life of Us (2001–2005); Love My Way (2004–2007); The Time of Our Lives (2013–2014)
- Partner: Jeremy Sparks (1995–2017)
- Children: 2

Claudia Karvan OAM (born 19 May 1972) is an Australian actress and producer. As a child actor, she first appeared in the film Molly (1983) and followed with an adolescent role in High Tide (1987). She portrayed a teacher who falls in love with her student in The Heartbreak Kid (1993). Karvan's roles in television series include The Secret Life of Us (2001–2005), Love My Way (2004–2007), Newton's Law (2017) and Halifax: Retribution (2020). She won Best Actress in a Leading Role in a Television Drama at the AFI Awards (later rebranded as the AACTA Awards) for her appearance in G.P. (1996). She won two similar AFI Awards for her role in Love My Way (2005 and 2007) and in 2014 for her work in The Time of Our Lives (2013–2014). As a co-producer and co-writer on Love My Way, she won three further AFI Awards for Best Drama Series in 2005, 2006 and 2007. Karvan was inducted into the Australian Film Walk of Fame in 2007 in acknowledgment of her contributions to the Australian film and television industry. From 2010 to 2011, she starred in the drama series Spirited, which she co-created and was executive producer. She appeared as Judy Vickers in Puberty Blues (2012, 2014). Karvan has co-produced House of Hancock (February 2015) and Doctor Doctor (2016–2021). In 2021 she co-created, co-produced and starred in the TV drama series, Bump.

== Early years and education ==
Claudia Karvan was born in Sydney on 19 May 1972. She grew up with her mother, Gabrielle Goddard, and two siblings. Her biological father, Peter Robins (died 2022) had separated from her mother when Karvan was a newborn. He was later diagnosed with schizoaffective disorder. Her surname comes from her stepfather, Arthur Karvan, the son of a Greek immigrant, George Karvouniares (1910–1972), who had Anglicised his surname to Karvan. George had emigrated to Australia on his own aged 16 from an island in Greece, speaking no English, and started selling ice-cream.

From the age of eight Karvan spent a year living in Bali with her mother and two brothers. After returning to Australia, Karvan's family moved to King's Cross, where her stepfather owned a restaurant and nightclub, Arthur's. Andrew Denton interviewed her on Enough Rope in March 2003, where she recalled, "It was great fun, drag queens everywhere and drunk adults. It was also like a home, because we lived across the road, so after school I'd come there, and it would be a hive of industry."

For primary school Karvan attended Glenmore Road Public School, Paddington. She then attended the Sydney Church of England Girls Grammar School (SCEGGS), "I went to SCEGGS, which was around the corner in Darlinghurst. And over the intercom they said, 'No girls are supposed to go beyond King's Cross Station any further down into Victoria Street.' That's where I live!... I do remember my street was out of bounds." AllMovie's Nathan Southern wrote, "Though she spent a short period dabbling in rebellious and somewhat edgy behaviour, she remained inherently intellectual and heavily gravitated to literature as a primary source of fascination."

== Career ==
=== Film ===
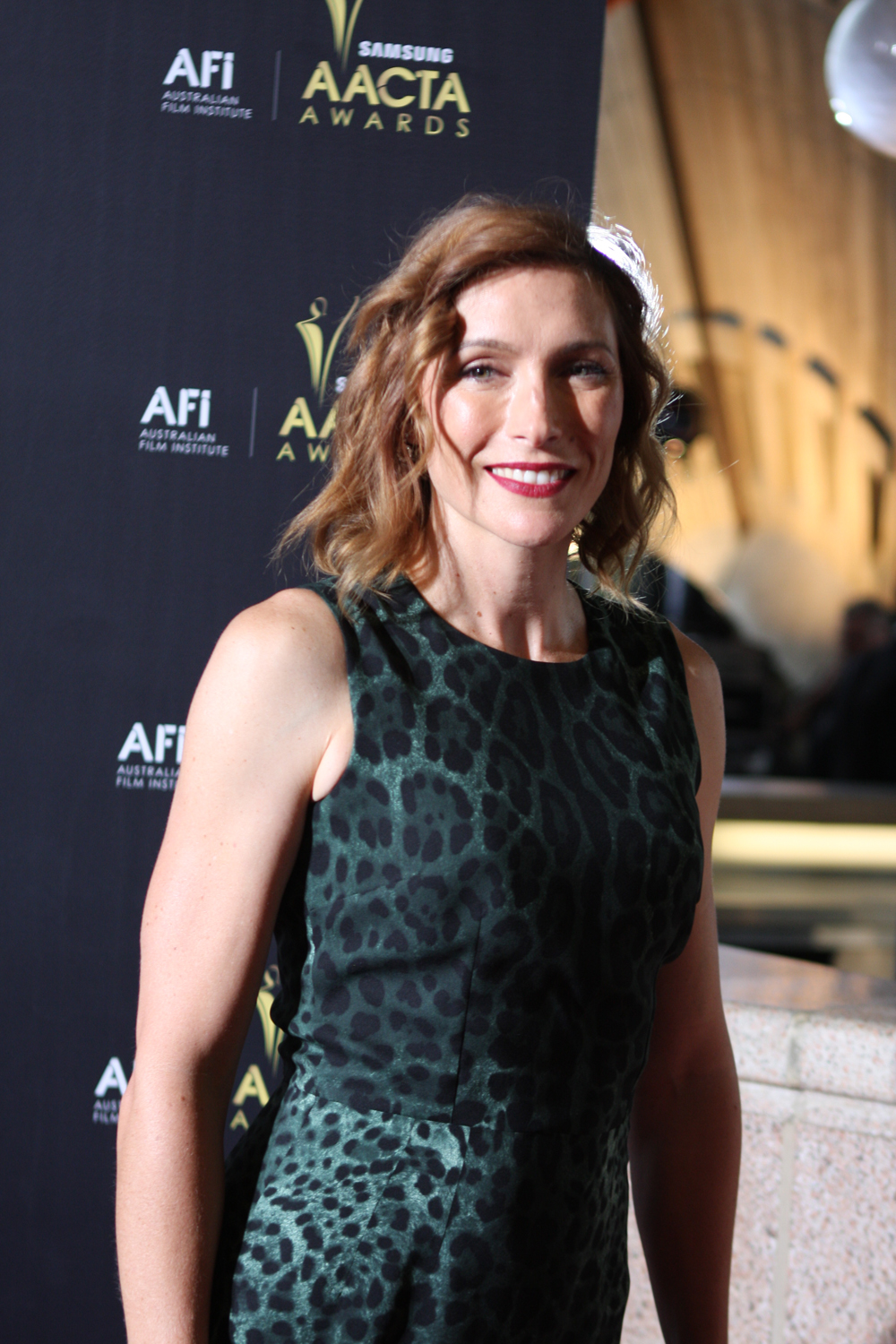
Karvan at the 2012 AACTA Awards

Karvan debuted in the children's film, Molly (1983), where she appeared as Maxie Ireland who befriends a talented dog, Molly. Eleanor Mannika of AllMovie reviewed it, "In this uneven children's story... [Molly's] new, young caretaker Maxie ([Karvan]) has her hands full because the villainous 'Old Dan'... [who] is such a sinister, psychotic type that the intended sense of adventure in the film is often no more than a sense of the macabre."

In 1987, she appeared in Phillip Noyce's Echoes of Paradise and then alongside Judy Davis in Gillian Armstrong's High Tide that same year. Paul Fischer of Tharunka described how, "virtually stealing the film is talented 14-year old, [Karvan]... she gives a vivid performance... [she] is brilliant in the demanding role, as she works beautifully with face and eyes to evoke various degrees of emotion. This young actor will do well in the future."

Karvan later reflected, "acting opposite Judy Davis, all the work's done for you. I remember her close-up was first and I was just bawling off camera... she's very powerful... I never look forward to [crying on screen]... [it] is a lot harder and a lot more, more confronting and lot more — You feel a lot more vulnerable. And I resist it." She received a nomination for AFI Award (Australian Film Institute Award) for Best Performance by an Actress in a Supporting Role (later re-titled AACTA Award for Best Actress in a Supporting Role) for her portrayal of Ally in High Tide but lost to Jan Adele, who depicted her grandmother, Bet, in the same film.

At 17-years-old Karvan secured a lead role, Joanna Johnson, in the Australian comedy, caper movie, The Big Steal (1990). Her love-interest, Danny Clarke (portrayed by Ben Mendelsohn), tries to impress her with his car, "[she] agrees to a date. But just as it seems that nirvana is to be easily attained, the motor blows up, along with the date." Mary Colbert of Filmnews observed, "It's first class entertainment; but a little more absurdity in the main characters ([Mendelsohn] and [Karvan]) would not have gone astray... [Karvan], affable and lovely, has the least developed role in the film – a waste of potential comic conflict."

In 1993 Karvan portrayed a 22-year-old secondary school teacher, Christina Papadopoulos, in The Heartbreak Kid. Her character has an affair with a 17-year-old student, Nick Polides (Alex Dimitriades). Paul Bongiorno, writing for The Canberra Times, observed, "As the lead player Karvan earns much sympathy. Watching her parents and fiancée plan her life, the audience hopes that Christina will stay with Nick." Producer, Ben Gannon, told Bongiorno, "it's such a difficult role. You don't want somebody coming across as a school teacher preying on a young student. She is intelligent. She has a complexity. And you can believe she is Greek." Gannon used the work for the related TV series, Heartbreak High (1994–1999); where Karvan's character of Christine was portrayed by Sarah Lambert. Karvan later reflected on the role in a 2024 interview, saying that she doesn't "take responsibility" for the controversial storyline: "I didn't write it. I didn't direct it. I didn't produce it... I was a 19 year old girl. And it was a tough job. I felt like I was an adult, and I was playing a very adult role... I probably wasn't that equipped to do it. I got through and I did it, but it wasn't my favourite job."

Karvan starred alongside fellow Australian actor Guy Pearce in Flynn, later retitled My Forgotten Man (1993) playing the young fiancée of Errol Flynn, and Dating the Enemy (1996) where the partners are body swapped. For Flynn shooting had started in 1989, when Karvan was 17, but due to various legal and financial disputes it had to be re-shot with some new cast members, a new director and new producers. By the time Flynn was released to video in 1996, Dating the Enemy had appeared in cinemas as "a second (much better) movie with Pearce."

Karvan had auditioned for the lead in the comedy film All Men Are Liars (1995), but did not take it up, which went to fellow actor Toni Pearen. Pearen recalled "the producer and the director telling me that [Karvan] was their first choice and she actually did a better audition than me. She was my favourite actress [sic.] and I always had in the back of my mind 'oh my God, Claudia Karvan was better than me, so I have to be really good!'" She worked opposite Hugh Jackman in the romantic comedy Paperback Hero (1999). In the same year she was nominated for an AFI Award for Best Performance by an Actress in a Supporting Role for the Percy Grainger biopic Passion (1999). She portrayed Grainger's early love interest, Alfhild de Luce, opposite Richard Roxburgh.

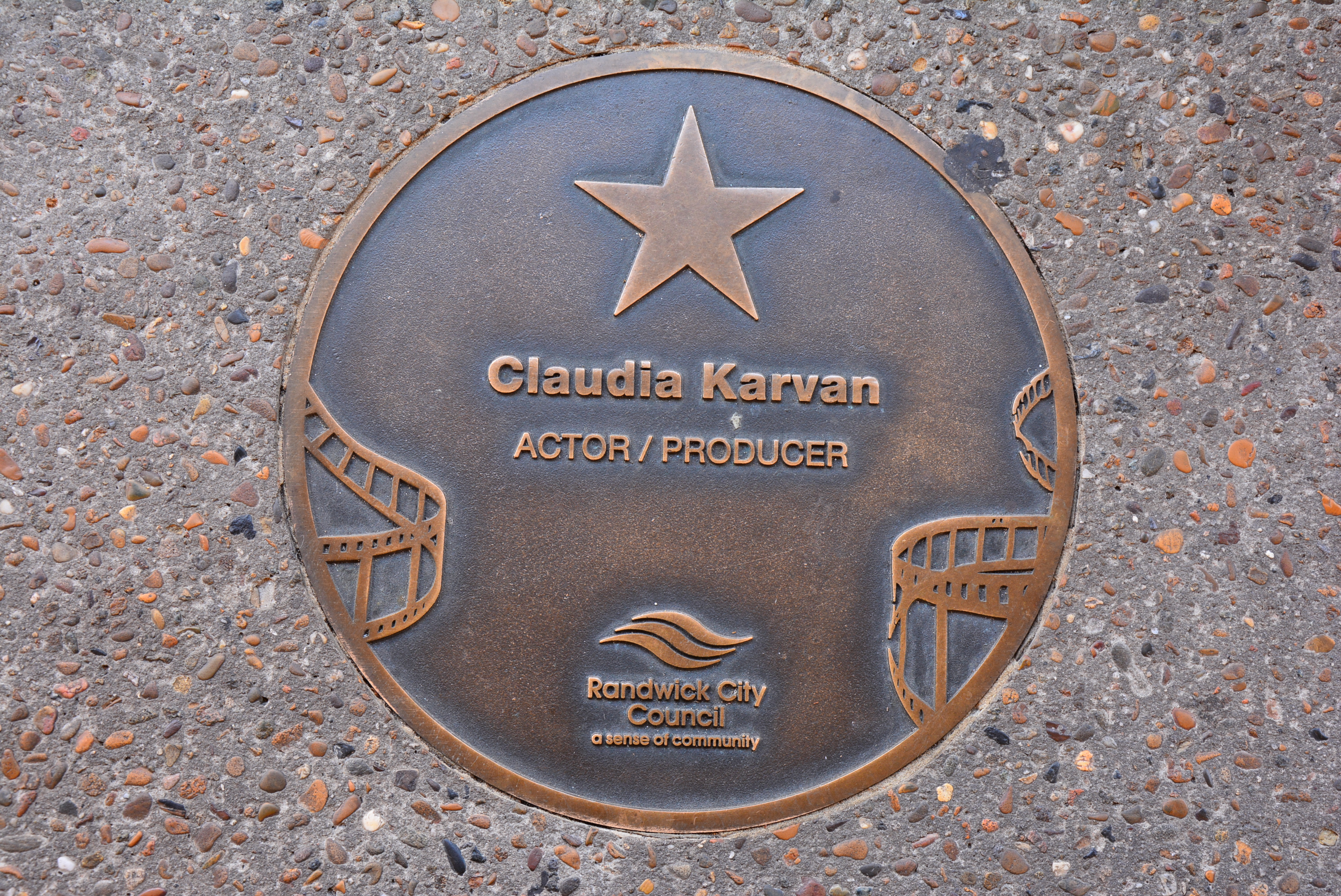
Karvan's plaque at the Australian Film Walk of Fame, Ritz Cinema, Randwick, Sydney

The actress took on the character Sola Naberrie in Star Wars: Episode III – Revenge of the Sith (2005), as the older sister of Padmé Amidala (played by Natalie Portman). As Sola she had also filmed scenes for Star Wars: Episode II – Attack of the Clones (2002), but they were cut from the theatrical release and appear only as an extra on the related two-disc DVD. She described working on the 2002 film, "It was one day's work and there was about 10 wardrobe calls for that one day. Amazing outfits. It felt a bit like — whew, this is big! But then you get on the set, and it's an all-Australian crew and it was lovely. I felt comfortable."

In 2006 she took the support role of Alison Berry, a welfare officer, in Footy Legends, a comedy sports drama about rugby league football. ABC North Queensland's Michael Clarke praised Anh Do and Lisa Saggers in the lead roles, but felt, "The rest of the cast, including [Karvan] and Peter Phelps are merely thin stereotypes, while the casting of real-life footy commentators Andrew Voss and Matthew Johns is painfully embarrassing." She played the role of Ginny Rogers, the mother of teenager, Hailey (Joanna Levesque), in the American teen fantasy, Aquamarine (2006).

In 2007 Karvan and Steve Bisley were inducted into the Australian Film Walk of Fame "for the skill, expertise and dedication to their craft which has contributed to the vitality and uniqueness of Australian Film, by the placing of plaques in the footpath" in front of the Ritz Cinema, Randwick. Senses of Cinema's Alexandra Heller-Nicholas observed, "Karvan's place as a major player across almost four decades of Australian screen culture was carved in stone." In 2008 she co-starred with Jim Caviezel in Long Weekend (retitled Nature's Grave in the United States).

In September 2008 she voiced the character of Michelle in $9.99, "a stop motion toon for grown-ups." She appeared in the 2009 film Daybreakers, a vampire thriller co-starring Ethan Hawke and Willem Dafoe and filmed on the Gold Coast. A highlight was "learning how to handle a crossbow. Her character, Audrey, is a survivor, hiding out alongside Dafoe's Elvis, while Hawke's Edward is a vampire scientist." She also appeared in 33 Postcards (2011) as Barbara, again alongside Guy Pearce.

Just weeks before shooting began on Infidel (2020), Karvan took over a role from another actress due to schedule conflicts. Once again, she starred opposite Caviezel as his on-screen wife, "[she] really dove into the part and she portrays the total exasperation a wife would feel when every avenue she pursues to get her husband out of prison is thwarted."

=== Television ===
Karvan's early television role, as Amanda, in the teen drama Princess Kate (1988), placed her supporting Justine Clarke in the title role. During that year she appeared in TV drama The Last Resort. In 2001 she was asked about working in an ongoing role and reflected, "The only television series I've ever done was at the ABC when I was about 15 – The Last Resort – so you can understand why there was some trepidation."

Karvan took the lead role of Asta Cadell, a motorcycle-riding lawyer, in the telemovie Natural Justice: Heat (1996), set in York, Western Australia. A critic for Australian Cinema described Karvan's performance, "I do not believe many other Australian actors could pull off the 'biker chick' with such style and beauty." Asta was previously portrayed by Deborra-Lee Furness in the feature film Shame (1988).

In 1996 Karvan won her first AFI award, Best Actress in a Leading Role in a Television Drama for her portrayal of Jessica Travis in medical drama G.P., season 8 episode 22, "Sing Me a Lullaby". During the filming of My Brother Jack (2001), Karvan took the role of Cressida Morley, "She's a wonderful character. She's described as having a pagan vitality, as being an authentic savage, and she reminds David (Matt Day) of his brother." She reflected on being cast in a supporting role, "Doing roles that aren't leads doesn't mean it's an inferior job. It's less time and less work but there's something about creating a character for a short period of time: when you don't have the whole telemovie to establish the character and show the arc, you've really got to utilise every second."

In 2001 Karvan starting working on The Secret Life of Us, playing the role of Alex Christensen for its telemovie and the following three of four seasons. Behind the scenes she was also a director on season 3 episodes, "Great Expectations" and "The People You Meet" (both 2003). She acknowledges that show's co-creator and producer, John Edwards, for "her shift from acting in shows to creating... He gave Karvan her first directing gig."

From 2004 she co-starred with Rebecca Gibney in a trilogy of telemovies, Small Claims, Small Claims: White Wedding (2005), and Small Claims: The Reunion (2006). They depict Jo Collins and Chrissy Hindmarsh, respectively, "a sleuthing duo of down-to-earth women. Karvan is a brisk, unbutch, 30-something policewoman; Gibney is a one-time lawyer, at the cusp of middle age." Gibney explained to Peter Craven of The Age, "when Claudia and I were approached we both insisted that we wanted to play ordinary recognisable women."

Besides acting in a lead role, Karvan was the co-creator, co-producer, and a scriptwriter of three seasons of the drama series Love My Way (2005–2007). Due to her continuing role as Frankie Paige she won her second AFI award for Best Actress in a Leading Role in a Television Drama in 2005 and her third in 2007 (rebranded as Best Lead Actress in a Television Drama). As a co-producer of Love My Way, Karvan received three further AFI awards, first in 2005 (shared with Edwards), second in 2006 (with Edwards and Jacquelin Perske), and third in 2007 (with Edwards), for Best Television Drama Series. Toby Creswell and Samantha Trenoweth listed her in their book, 1001 Australians You Should Know (2006), and described how "[she] has been exploring the highs and lows of fractured family life... She clearly has great range and for the past two years she has starred in and produced the cutting edge drama Love My Way."

The telemovie Saved (2009) had her depicting Julia, an advocate for a detainee, asylum seeker Amir (Osamah Sami). In August 2010 Karvan co-created, produced, and starred in the supernatural comedy-drama series Spirited. She plays a Sydney dentist, Suzy Darling, who has left her husband Steve (Rodger Corser) and moved into a penthouse, which she discovers is haunted by the ghost of a 1980s British rock musician, Henry (Matt King).

Karvan was cast as Judy Vickers for two seasons of Puberty Blues (2012, 2014). It is inspired by the 1981 film of the same name and the 1979 novel. She described her perspective, "It's like they're looking at the '70s with 2012 eyes. It's quite unflinching, it's quite detailed... I've never done a period piece of a time that I've lived through – it feels a bit like time travel. It's gorgeous." The actress introduced an Australian Story episode, "Life After Puberty", in September 2012, and reflected on the original film, "The two teenage girls who starred in Puberty Blues looked set for big careers on screen. Tonight's program reveals the bittersweet story of Nell Schofield and her co-star, Jad Capelja."

In the ABC miniseries The Time Of Our Lives (2013–14) she starred as Caroline Tivolli. Anna Brain of The Herald Sun described the role, "Newly separated and working to resurrect her career, the overly anxious mother of one with tiger-parent tendencies is a divisive character." Brain continued, "Having delved into the character's psyche and found an intelligent, under-utilised woman, Karvan doesn't feel that Caroline would be likely to return the compliment." Also in the show was Justine Clarke as Caroline's co-sister-in-law, Bernadette. Karvan was co-producer of House of Hancock (February 2015), a fictionalised TV drama of the relationship between Gina Rinehart and her step-mother Rose Porteous. She reflected on the work, "[it's a] story about the legacy of parenting and family (and) she's such an enigmatic and unique character."

In 2016 she starred opposite Pearce in drama series Jack Irish as his love-interest, Sarah Longmore. Also in that year she co-produced the medical drama series Doctor Doctor. Her fellow producers on the show were Tony McNamara and Ian Collie. She had acted to scripts written by McNamara on The Secret Life of Us, Love My Way, and Puberty Blues. Karvan and Collie had started collaborating after The Broken Shore, which he had produced. In 2017 she took the titular character, Josephine Newton, in legal drama series Newton's Law.

Early in 2020 she was a contestant on Dancing with the Stars alongside her professional dance partner, Aric Yegudkin. They finished in third place, despite earning a perfect score from the judges, in the finale episode, "before viewer votes were added to the mix and dropped her down." She reconnected with Gibney (as Jane Halifax) while portraying her rival, Mandy Petras, in the crime drama series Halifax: Retribution (2020). The Sydney Morning Herald's Craig Mathieson noticed, "Karvan is the show's best asset, needling Halifax with fake compassion... [her character] is a welcome seam of subtlety, a necessary antidote to the burnt-out cop clichés" of castmate Anthony LaPaglia as Tom Saracen. Karvan co-created, with Kelsey Munro, and starred in the Australian web television drama series Bump (2021). She also co-produced the series with John Edwards and his son Dan Edwards.

On 18 February 2025, Stan Australia announced a film for the series Bump, titled Bump: A Christmas Film where Karvan would reprise the role of Angie Davis from the show.

=== Stage ===
In April 1991 Karvan acted in the Shakespearean play Henry IV, Part 1 at Riverside Theatres in Parramatta. She also appeared as Kathy "Bubba" Ryan in a production of Summer of the Seventeenth Doll at the Seymour Centre, Chippendale, in August of that year. During April 1995 she performed in Poor Super Man at Wharf 2 Theatre, Sydney. The play was written by Brad Fraser, and was used as the basis for Canadian drama film Leaving Metropolis (2002). Karvan acted at Wharf 1 Theatre in December 1998 in Fred, a play written by Beatrix Christian. Mark Stoyich of Green Left described the play, "[it] begins as a brittle, fairly funny murder mystery turns into a speculation on the meaning of life, with a bit of sex-farce of the slamming door variety." Her character of Monica is a TV actress, "neurotic, dippy vegetarian ... [who] dresses sexily and throws herself at Detective Rose (John Adam)."

== Personal life ==
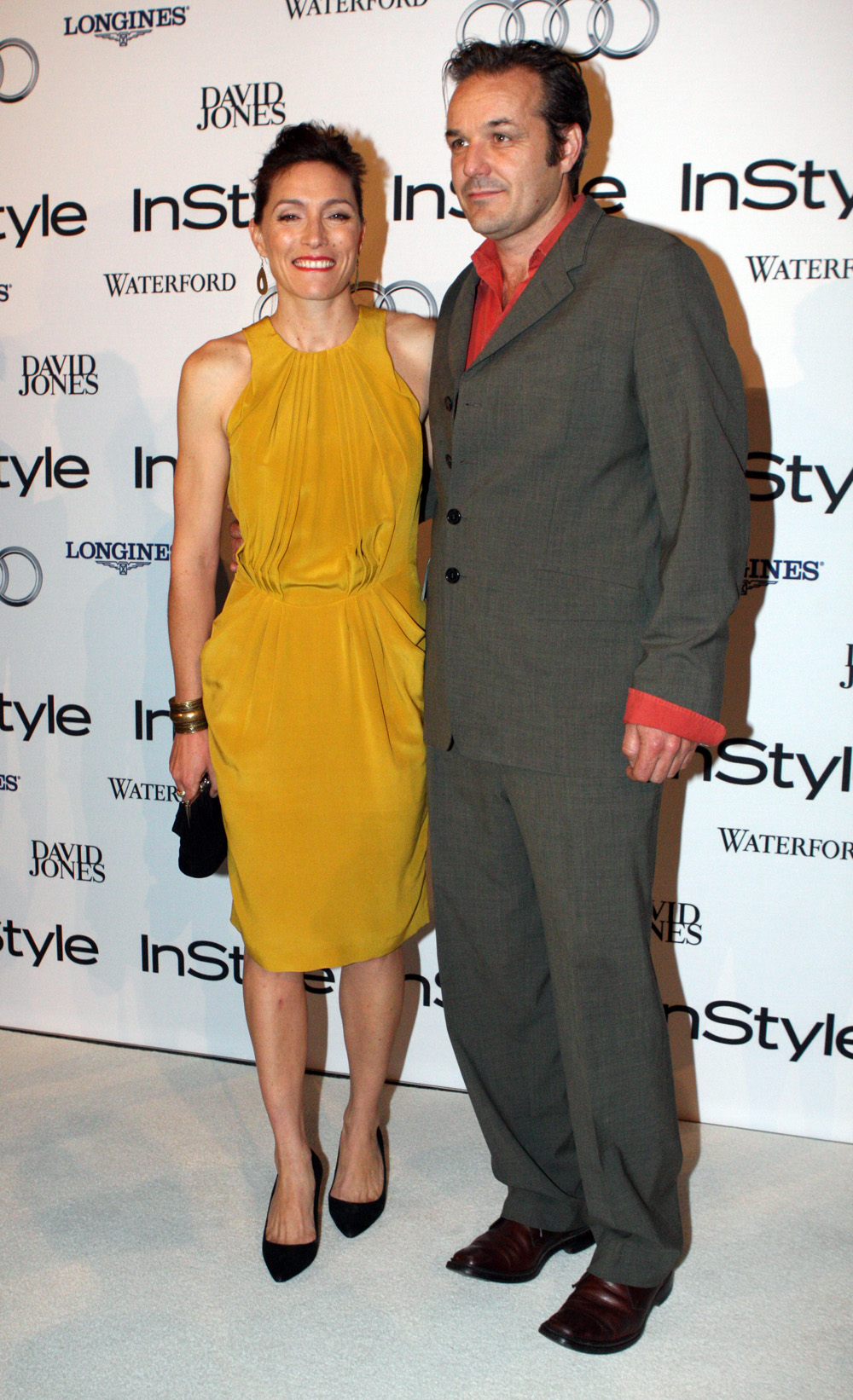
Karvan and former long-term partner, Jeremy Sparks, May 2013

While living in Bondi in the early 1990s, Karvan’s flatmate was fellow actress Justine Clarke. The pair had met when they were 8-year-olds. They first acted together on Princess Kate in 1988. Karvan recalled, "We had, like, 10 auditions. It was between Jussie and I. And we lived down the road from each other in Paddington... You can't take those decisions personally, about roles. Right after I got High Tide you got the role I went for, Princess Kate." Karvan was in a relationship with Canadian-born Australian actor, Aden Young, which began in 1993 when both were filmed in Exile (1994), and ended in 1995. They had previously acted together in Broken Highway (1993).

Karvan said in a 1995 interview that her acting, "has mostly been intuitive. But comedy and theatre have allowed [her] to... concentrate on [her] craft – breathing, movement, thought dialogue... Some picked up from acting courses and much from [Clarke]." She cited her acting heroes as, "Judy Davis, Jessica Lange, and Jennifer Jason Leigh."

Karvan first met Jeremy Sparks, an Australian film set constructor and later an engineer, in the late 1980s. They became domestic partners in 1995 and have two children, Albee and Audrey. She is also stepmother to pop singer Holiday Sidewinder, Sparks' daughter from a previous relationship with Australian actress Lo Carmen. Karvan (cameo role) and Carmen (as Meryl) had both appeared in a film, The Nostradamus Kid (1993), which was shot in late 1991 and early 1992. Both had previously acted in the TV series, The Last Resort (1988). In 2011, Karvan said of Sparks, "When we got together he was a single father, and the way he navigated that really impressed me. He was a great dad then, and now. He's physical and consistent and funny." Karvan and Sparks separated in 2017.

In October 2019, Sidewinder, residing in Los Angeles, recalled growing up with Karvan and Sparks, "My stepmother was a famous actress and the bigger breadwinner in my dad's household. Lots of strong women around. I lived on Bondi Beach with dad, surfing and swimming off the rocks at sunset." Audrey Sparks made her acting debut as Little Girl (Young Suzy) in the Spirited episode, "I Remember Nothing" (September 2010). Karvan portrays the adult Suzy Darling and is a co-producer for the series. Audrey reprised her role in season 2 episode, "Time After Time" (July 2011).

At the "What Women Want" forum in September 2002, Karvan discussed the refugee crisis and criticised the Australian policy of mandatory detention.

Karvan started salsa dancing as a hobby in 2017 to help with rehabilitation after being treated for a herniated disc. During her stint on Dancing with the Stars in 2020, Karvan dedicated her salsa dance to a childhood friend, Samantha, who had died two years previously.

As of August 2020 Karvan and her children resided in Redfern, having lived in the area for 15 years.

In 2023, Karvan was the subject of a painted portrait by Sydney-based artist Laura Jones, which was a finalist for the Archibald Prize that year.

In 2025 it was reported in Australian Women's Weekly that she had been in a romantic relationship with pop rock drummer, Dave Galafassi (ex-Gelbison), since December 2022.

== Filmography ==
=== Film ===
Year	Title	Role	Notes	Ref.
1982	Going Down	Disgruntled child	Feature film	
1983	Molly	Maxie Ireland	Feature film	
1987	High Tide	Ally	Feature film	
1987	Echoes of Paradise (aka Shadows of the Peacock)	Julie	Feature film	
1990	The Big Steal	Joanna Johnson	Feature film	
1991	Holidays on the River Yarra	Elsa	Feature film	
1992	Redheads	Lucy	Feature film	
1993	The Nostradamus Kid	Beat girl (cameo)	Feature film	
1993	Touch Me	Christine	Short film	
1993	My Forgotten Man (aka Flynn)	Penelope Watts	Feature film	
1993	Broken Highway	Catherine	Feature film	
1993	The Heartbreak Kid	Christina Papadopoulos	Feature film	
1994	Exile	Jean	Feature film	
1995	Hell, Texas and Home		Short film	
1996	Lust and Revenge	Georgina Oliphant	Feature film	
1996	Dating the Enemy	Tash/Brett	Feature film	
1998	Two Girls and a Baby	Catherine	Short film	
1999	Paperback Hero	Ruby Vale	Feature film	
1999	Passion	Alfhild de Luce	Feature film	
1999	Strange Planet	Judy	Feature film	
2000	Risk	Louise Roncoli	Feature film	
2002	Star Wars: Episode II – Attack of the Clones	Sola Naberrie	Scenes deleted (Note: Karvan's Star Wars: Episode II Attack of the Clones scenes were deleted for the theatrical release, but are available as an extra on the related two-disc DVD release.)	
2005	Star Wars: Episode III – Revenge of the Sith	Sola Naberrie	Feature film	
2006	Aquamarine	Ginny Rogers	Feature film	
2006	Footy Legends	Alison Berry	Feature film	
2008	$9.99	Michelle (voice)	Animated film	
2008	Long Weekend	Carla	Feature film	
2009	Daybreakers	Audrey Bennett	Feature film	
2011	33 Postcards	Barbara	Feature film	
2012	Scratch	Holly	Short film	
2013	The Darkside	Socialite	Feature film	
2019	True History of the Kelly Gang	Mrs. Shelton	Feature film	
2020	Infidel	Elizabeth Rawlins	Feature film	
2021	June Again	Ginny	Feature film	
2022	Moja Vesna	Miranda	Feature film	
2025	Bump: A Christmas Film	Angie Davis		

=== Television ===
Year	Title	Role	Notes	Ref.
1988	Touch the Sun: Princess Kate	Amanda	TV film	
1988	The Last Resort	Emma Parker	TV series	
1994	Review	Guest reviewer	1 episode	
1996	Natural Justice: Heat	Asta Cadell	TV film	
1996	G.P.	Jessica Travis	Season 8, episode 22, "Sing Me a Lullaby"	
1996	Twisted Tales	Cassie Blake	TV film series, episode 12: "One Way Ticket"	
1997	Fallen Angels	Yvonne Everett	Episode 9: "Baby It's You"	
1998	The Violent Earth	Jeanne	Miniseries, episode 5: "Farewell to Innocence"	
1998	Never Tell Me Never	Janine Shepherd	TV film	
2000	The Lost World	Catherine Reilly	Season 1, episode 16: "Time After Time"	
2000	Farscape	Natira	Season 2, episodes 19, 20, 21 (Note: Karvan's Farscape episodes are Series 2, episode 19: "Liars, Guns, and Money (Part I): A Not So Simple Plan"; episode 20: "Liars, Guns, and Money (Part II): With Friends Like These"; episode 21: "Liars, Guns, and Money (Part III): Plan B".)	
2001	My Brother Jack	Cressida Morley	Miniseries, 2 episodes	
2001–2003	The Secret Life of Us	Alex Christensen	Main role (series 1–3), director (2 episodes) (Note: Karvan's The Secret Life of Us episodes, which she also directed are Series 3, episode 13: "Great Expectations"; episode 14: "The People You Meet".)	
2004	Small Claims	Jo Collins	TV film	
2004–2007	Love My Way	Frankie Paige	Also co-creator, co-producer, scriptwriter	
2005	Small Claims: White Wedding	Jo Collins	TV film	
2006	Small Claims: The Reunion	Jo Collins	TV film	
2009	Saved	Julia Weston	TV film	
2009	Paper Dolls: Australian Pinups of World War 2	Narrator	Documentary	
2010	Erotic Tales		1 episode	
2010–2011	Spirited	Suzy Darling	Co-creator, co-producer	
2012	Australian Story	Herself	1 episode	
2012–2014	Puberty Blues	Judy Vickers		
2013	Better Man	Bernadette McMahon	Miniseries, episode 3: "The Last Dance", 4: "A Lost Lamb"	
2013	The Broken Shore	Helen Castleman	TV film	
2013–2014	The Time of Our Lives	Caroline Tivolli		
2014	Shaun Micallef's Mad as Hell	Rupert Murdoch	Episode "3.6"	
2014	Taking on the Chocolate Frog	Narrator	Miniseries	
2016	Jack Irish	Sarah Longmore	TV film	
2017	Newton's Law	Josephine Newton		
2017	David Stratton: A Cinematic Life	Herself	2 episodes	
2018	Orange Is the New Brown	Various roles (Note: Karvan's Orange Is the New Brown roles are Episode 1: Keepcup Fan; episode 3: Bin-driver's Girlfriend; episode 5: Restaurant Manager; episode 6: Mum Cop.)	Episodes "1.1", "1.3", "1.5", "1.6"	
2019	The Other Guy	Miranda	Season 2	
2020	Black Comedy		Episode "4.3"	
2020	Halifax: Retribution	Mandy Petras	Miniseries	
2020	Play School	Presenter	1 episode	
2020	Life Drawing Live	Herself (participant)	TV special	
2020	Dancing with the Stars	Contestant		
2021	Untold Australia	Narrator	1 episode	
2021	Books That Made Us	Presenter, narrator	1 episode	
2021–2024	Bump	Angie Davis	Web series, 48 episodes, also co-creator, co-producer	
2023	The Clearing	Mariam Herzog	1 episode	
2023	Australian Story	Herself	Episode: "Claudia Karvan: Making a Scene"	
2024	Fisk	Vicki	1 episode	
2026	Homebodies	Nora	TV series	
2026	The Airport Chaplain	Cath Barnes	TV series	

== Awards and nominations ==
Year	Nominated work	Award	Category	Result	Ref.
1987	High Tide	Australian Film Institute Award	Best Performance by an Actress in a Supporting Role	Nominated	
1990	The Big Steal	Australian Film Institute Award	Best Performance by an Actress in a Leading Role	Nominated	
1992	Redheads	Australian Film Institute Award	Best Performance by an Actress in a Leading Role	Nominated	
1993	Broken Highway	Australian Film Institute Award	Best Performance by an Actress in a Leading Role	Nominated	
1996	Dating the Enemy	Australian Film Institute Award	Best Performance by an Actress in a Leading Role	Nominated	
1996	G.P. (season 8, episode 22: "Sing Me a Lullaby"	Australian Film Institute Award	Best Performance by an Actress in a Leading Role in a Television Drama	Won	
1998	Never Tell Me Never	Australian Film Institute Award	Best Performance by an Actress in a Leading Role in a Television Drama	Nominated	
1999	Passion	Australian Film Institute Award	Best Performance by an Actress in a Supporting Role	Nominated	
1999	The Violent Earth	Logie Award	Most Outstanding Actress in a Series	Nominated	
2001	The Secret Life of Us	Australian Film Institute Award	Best Actress in a Leading Role in a Television Drama Series	Nominated	
2002	The Secret Life of Us	Australian Film Institute Award	Best Actress in a Leading Role in a Television Drama Series	Nominated	
2002	The Secret Life of Us	Logie Award	Most Outstanding Actress	Nominated	
2002	The Secret Life of Us	Logie Award	Most Popular Actress	Nominated	
2003	The Secret Life of Us	Australian Film Institute Award	Best Actress in a Leading Role in a Television Drama Series	Nominated	
2003	The Secret Life of Us	Logie Award	Most Outstanding Actress in a Drama Series	Won	
2003	The Secret Life of Us	Logie Award	Most Popular Actress	Nominated	
2004	The Secret Life of Us	Logie Award	Most Outstanding Actress in a Drama Series	Nominated	
2004	Small Claims	Australian Film Institute Award	Best Actress in a Leading Role in a Television Drama Series	Nominated	
2005	Claudia Karvan, John Edwards for Love My Way	Australian Film Institute Award	Best Television Drama Series	Won	
2005	Love My Way	Australian Film Institute Award	Best Lead Actress in a Television Drama	Won	
2005	Love My Way	Logie Award	Most Outstanding Actress in a Drama Series	Nominated	
2006	Karvan, John Edwards, Jacquelin Perske for Love My Way	Australian Film Institute Award	Best Television Drama Series	Won	
2006	Love My Way	Australian Film Institute Award	Best Lead Actress in a Television Drama	Nominated	
2006	Love My Way	Logie Award	Most Outstanding Actress in a Drama Series	Won	
2007	Karvan, Edwards for Love My Way	Australian Film Institute Award	Best Television Drama Series	Won	
2007	Love My Way	Australian Film Institute Award	Best Lead Actress in a Television Drama	Won	
2007	Love My Way	Logie Award	Most Outstanding Actress in a Drama Series	Nominated	
2008	Love My Way	Logie Award	Most Outstanding Actress in a Drama Series	Nominated	
2010	Karvan, Edwards, Perske for Spirited	Australian Film Institute Award	Best Television Drama Series	Nominated	
2010	Saved	Logie Award	Most Outstanding Actress	Won	
2011	Karvan, Perske for Spirited	AACTA Award	Best Television Drama Series	Nominated	
2013	The Time of Our Lives	AACTA Award	Best Lead Actress in a Television Drama	Nominated	
2014	The Time of Our Lives	Logie Award	Most Outstanding Actress	Nominated	
2016	Claudia Karvan	Gold Coast Film Festival	Chauvel Award	Won	
2023	Claudia Karvan	Medal of the Order of Australia (OAM) in the 2023 Australia Day Honours	Service to the film and television industry	Honoured	
2026	Claudia Karvan	Logie Award	Best Supporting Actress in a Drama	Won	

== See also ==
- List of Australian film actors
