= Puberty Blues (TV series) =

Australian television series

- Series One opening title card
- Genre: Coming-of-age; Comedy-drama; Period drama
- Created by: John Edwards, Imogen Banks
- Written by: Tony McNamara, Alice Bell, Fiona Seres, Jonathan Gavin, Shyt Henderson-Croft
- Starring: Brenna Harding; Claudia Karvan; Dan Wyllie; Jeremy Lindsay Taylor; Ashleigh Cummings; Susan Prior; Sean Keenan; Ed Oxenbould; Katie Wall; Charlotte Best; Isabelle Cornish; Reef Ireland; Dylan Goodearl; Jonathan Gavin; Christian Byers
- Theme music composer: Paul Hewson
- Opening theme: "Are You Old Enough?" by Dragon
- Composer: Stephen Rae
- Country of origin: Australia
- Original language: English
- No. of series: 2
- No. of episodes: 17

Production
- Executive producers: Rick Maier; Janeen Faithfull
- Producers: Imogen Banks; John Edwards
- Production locations: Sydney, New South Wales
- Cinematography: John Brawley
- Editors: Deborah Peart, Geoff Hitchins
- Running time: 45 minutes
- Production company: Endemol Australia (Then branded as Southern Star Entertainment)

Original release
- Network: Network Ten
- Release: 15 August 2012 – 7 May 2014

Related
- Puberty Blues

Puberty Blues is an Australian coming-of-age comedy-drama television series broadcast on Network Ten. It is based on the 1979 book by Kathy Lette and Gabrielle Carey, which was also the inspiration for the 1981 film Puberty Blues. Set during the late 1970s, the series revolves around the family and friends of Debbie and Sue, two inseparable teenage friends who are coming of age in Sydney's Sutherland Shire. The first series of eight episodes began airing from 15 August 2012. A second series was later confirmed and premiered on 5 March 2014.

== Production ==
In January 2012, it was announced an eight-part adaptation of the coming-of-age novel Puberty Blues would be made in New South Wales. The series, based on Kathy Lette and Gabrielle Carey's 1970s book, focuses on a group of teenagers from Cronulla "as they explore sex and the gender politics of the day."

Filming on the series began in April 2012, with locations mainly around the Sutherland Shire on Wanda Beach. The shoot lasted for twelve weeks and wrapped on 1 July 2012. Puberty Blues began airing from 15 August 2012.

On 16 September 2012, Debbie Schipp from The Daily Telegraph reported Southern Star producers John Edwards and Imogen Banks were planning a second series of Puberty Blues. Edwards stated "Yes, we are discussing it now. There's a strong chance, and Imogen and I have been in the plotting room and are well into development ourselves. So for those demanding more, we have high hopes we'll deliver." Edwards and Banks revealed the storyline would probably pick up from where series one ended or maybe a year later.

On 23 October 2012, the official Puberty Blues Facebook page confirmed that there would be a second series of the show premiering in 2013 on the Australian television network; Channel Ten. Filming for the second series began in May 2013, and began broadcasting in March 2014.

On 8 May 2014, Ten's production division went bankrupt. Co-producer John Edwards told TV Tonight that a third season of Puberty Blues is likely but may not come immediately.

== Cast and characters ==
Main Cast

Actor	Character	Season	
Actor	Character	1	2
Ashleigh Cummings	Debbie Vickers	Main	Main
Brenna Harding	Sue Knight	Main	Main
Claudia Karvan	Judy Vickers	Main	Main
Jeremy Lindsay Taylor	Martin Vickers	Main	Main
Ed Oxenbould	David Vickers	Main	Main
Susie Porter	Pam Parker	Main	Main
Daniel Wyllie	Roger Knight	Main	Main
Rodger Corser	Ferris Hennessey	Main	Main
Susan Prior	Yvonne Hennessey	Main	Main
Sean Keenan	Gary Hennessey	Main	Main
Isabelle Cornish	Vicki	Main	Main
Charlotte Best	Cheryl Hayes	Main	Main
Katie Wall	Lynette Hayes	Main	Recurring
Reef Ireland	Bruce Board	Main	Recurring
Dylan Goodearl	Danny Dixon	Main	Recurring
Jonathan Gavin	Graham	Recurring	Main
Christian Byers	Mark "Woody" Woods		Main

Supporting Cast

Actor	Character	Season	
Actor	Character	1	2
Jack Horsley	Straccy	Recurring	Recurring
Izzy Stevens	Tracey Smart	Recurring	Recurring
Ellie Gall	Raquel	Recurring	Recurring
Pearl Herbert	Kim	Recurring	Recurring
Lachlan Galbraith	Matty	Recurring	Recurring
Thorsten Hertog	Jonno	Recurring	Recurring
Lachlan Skene	Jacko	Recurring	Recurring
Leon Ford	Mr. Candy	Recurring	Recurring
Eleanor Munro	Freida	Recurring	Recurring
Annie Maynard	Annie	Recurring	Recurring
Luke Ledger	Broadie	Recurring	Recurring
Tyler Atkins	Darren Peters	Recurring	
Jessica Nash	Nancy		Recurring
Di Smith	Deputy Grantham	Recurring	
Oscar Redding	Nathan		Recurring
Simon Lyndon	Gumby Richards	Recurring	

== Episodes ==
=== Series overview ===
Series	Episodes	Originally released	
Series	Episodes	First released	Last released
1	8	15 August 2012	3 October 2012
2	9	5 March 2014	7 May 2014

=== Season 1 (2012) ===
No. overall	No. in series	Title	Directed by	Written by	Original release date	AUS viewers (millions)
1	1	"Episode One"	Glendyn Ivin	Tony McNamara	15 August 2012	0.925
The year is 1977 and teenagers Debbie and Sue fantasise about joining the Greenhills gang who rule the local beach.
2	2	"Episode Two"	Emma Freeman	Fiona Seres	22 August 2012	0.843
After Debbie kisses Bruce Board, ace surfer and super spunk, it could help the girls crack the Greenhills Gang.
3	3	"Episode Three"	Glendyn Ivin	Alice Bell	29 August 2012	0.751
If Debbie and Sue are to have a future with the Greenhills gang, it means that they will be forced to growing up quickly and also prove themselves with the boys.
4	4	"Episode Four"	Emma Freeman	Tony McNamara	5 September 2012	0.728
A party that turns wild changes everything for Sue and Debbie.
5	5	"Episode Five"	Glendyn Ivin	Alice Bell	12 September 2012	0.673
Cheryl stays at Debbie's house for a while and manages to prove an unwelcome guest to almost everyone except young David. Ferris' mid-life crisis gets out of control.
6	6	"Episode Six"	Glendyn Ivin	Fiona Seres	19 September 2012	0.696
A night out for Debbie and Sue and the Greenhills gang ends in disaster.
7	7	"Episode Seven"	Emma Freeman	Tony McNamara	26 September 2012	0.653
The Greenhills gang gather together for an ocean ceremony, while Pam and Roger plan a career move that could see them leave their beloved Cronulla behind forever.
8	8	"Episode Eight"	Emma Freeman	Alice Bell	3 October 2012	0.707
Debbie and Sue's growing disenchantment with the gang and their rigid rules ends in defiance when they stand up to the boys and try surfing for themselves.

=== Season 2 (2014) ===
No. overall	No. in series	Title	Directed by	Written by	Original release date	AUS viewers (millions)
9	1	"Episode Nine"	Glendyn Ivin	Tony McNamara	5 March 2014	0.538
After Debbie is threatened with boarding school, she realises her mother is a snob who doesn't like the Knight family. Yvonne begins an affair with Graham who happened to be Judy and Martin's marriage counsellor. Woody begins following Sue around every where. David begins gambling and works out a system. Pam returns from Japan. Roger gets fired from his job. Cheryl finds out she's pregnant and has an abortion, but even then, she won't reveal the baby daddy. Martin and Judy have Roger and Pam over for dinner.
10	2	"Episode Ten"	Glendyn Ivin	Alice Bell	12 March 2014	0.477
Debbie and Sue's relationship is in danger after Debbie is threatened with boarding school. Nothing can keep them apart though.
11	3	"Episode Eleven"	Sean Kruck	Tony McNamara	19 March 2014	0.529
Yvonne finds herself feeling torn between two lovers after Gary's father returns to town. Cheryl turns to Judy for help, with some surprising consequences.
12	4	"Episode Twelve"	Sean Kruck	Alice Bell	26 March 2014	0.517
Debbie is not happy to find out that Cheryl is living in her room. Ferris decides to reclaim his wife. Martin finds the past coming back to haunt him.
13	5	"Episode Thirteen"	Emma Freeman	Jonathan Gavin	2 April 2014	0.464
Worlds collide when Debbie brings her new boarding school friend back to Cronulla for Gary's birthday party. Meanwhile, Judy's world is shaken over Annie's death and what appears to be Martin's infidelity.
14	6	"Episode Fourteen"	Emma Freeman	Alice Bell	9 April 2014	0.384
Debbie's reputation at school is in tatters while Sue has a guilty secret of her own.
15	7	"Episode Fifteen"	Glendyn Ivin	Tony McNamara	16 April 2014	0.556
Gary decides to move out of home; Roger experiences a father's worst nightmare by walking in on Sue having sex; Judy's family is keeping secrets.
16	8	"Episode Sixteen"	Glendyn Ivin	Alice Bell	30 April 2014	0.529
Debbie returns from boarding school to discover everything has changed; Vicki's wedding day is surprisingly eventful as Cheryl and Debbie finally face off against each other
17	9	"Episode Seventeen"	Glendyn Ivin	Tony McNamara	7 May 2014	0.578
A tragedy spurs Debbie into drastic action. Meanwhile, an emotional Judy surprises everyone at Pam's 40th birthday.

== Promotion and reception ==
Network Ten released the first episode exclusively to Facebook users who liked the official Puberty Blues page prior to the premiere. Graeme Blundell from The Australian praised the first episodes and stated "And, like the book, the series is racy, confronting, often quite brutal, heartbreaking and coruscatingly entertaining. It sparkles even as it disturbingly illuminates a culture of adolescence that seems not so much dated as distressingly contemporary."

Craig Mathieson of The Sydney Morning Herald wrote "Puberty Blues is good. Really good. What's perhaps been most interesting about the series, set as it is about 35 years back, is just how dark it is. No, this is not Mad Men, far from it, but the folks behind Puberty Blues have cultivated a surprisingly opaque picture of late-1970s Australia." Mathieson's colleague, Melinda Houston, gave the series a mixed review, saying "That combination of anticipation and ennui is something this version of Puberty Blues has captured beautifully. Unfortunately, it doesn't always make for gripping telly, especially prime-time commercial telly. We, too, tend to sit there waiting, waiting, fidgeting, waiting – and suffocating just a bit." Houston explained that the inclusion of the parents' stories felt like a distraction, despite the good performances from the cast. However, the critic added that Puberty Blues is not "a failure by any means. It's certainly a handsome piece, from the opening credits to the pitch-perfect interiors."

=== Ratings ===
Season	No. of Episodes	Season Premiere	Season Final	Peak Audience^{a}	Average Audience^{a}
One	8	15 August 2012	3 October 2012	925,000	747,000
Two	9	5 March 2014	7 May 2014	578,000	508,000

The premiere episode debuted to 925,000 viewers and came 9th for the night in its 8:30 timeslot.

==== Season 1 ====
Episode	Title	Original airdate	Overnight Viewers	Consolidated Viewers	Nightly Rank
1-01	"Episode 1"	15 August 2012	0.925	1.043	9
1-02	"Episode 2"	22 August 2012	0.843	1.015	12
1-03	"Episode 3"	29 August 2012	0.751	0.899	12
1-04	"Episode 4"	5 September 2012	0.728	0.870	15
1-05	"Episode 5"	12 September 2012	0.673	0.834	15
1-06	"Episode 6"	19 September 2012	0.696	0.857	16
1-07	"Episode 7"	26 September 2012	0.653	0.793	16
1-08	"Episode 8"	3 October 2012	0.707	0.840	16

==== Season 2 ====
Episode	Title	Original airdate	Overnight Viewers	Consolidated Viewers	Nightly Rank
2-01	"Episode 9"	5 March 2014	0.538	0.625	17
2-02	"Episode 10"	12 March 2014	0.477	0.590	19
2-03	"Episode 11"	19 March 2014	0.529	0.670	18
2-04	"Episode 12"	26 March 2014	0.517	0.651	17
2-05	"Episode 13"	2 April 2014	0.464	0.588	17
2-06	"Episode 14"	9 April 2014	0.384	0.544	23
2-07	"Episode 15"	16 April 2014	0.556	0.682	14
2-08	"Episode 16"	30 April 2014	0.529	0.674	19
2-09	"Episode 17"	7 May 2014	0.578	0.706	19

Figures are OzTAM Data for the 5 City Metro areas. Overnight – Live broadcast and recordings viewed the same night. Consolidated – Live broadcast and recordings viewed within the following seven days.

== Notes ==
- ^{a} The Average Audience and Peak Audience ratings are based on overnight viewers
