= Australian Film Future Foundation =

Defunct Australian film preservation not-for-profit

- Formation: 2015
- Dissolved: 2023 (charity registration revoked)
- Type: Not-for-profit arts organisation
- Purpose: Film preservation and digitisation
- Location: Melbourne, Victoria, Australia
- Key people: Ron V. Brown, Alan Finney, Claudia Karvan (ambassador)
- Affiliations: OzFlix

The Australian Film Future Foundation (AFFF) was an Australian not-for-profit arts organisation established to fund the restoration and digitisation of Australian screen content.

== History and operations ==
Founded in 2015 by film and television producer Ron V. Brown and distributor Alan Finney, the foundation operated as the charitable sister organisation to the Australian-only streaming service OzFlix. Its primary mandate was to raise funds and provide grants to filmmakers and rights holders to transfer, repair, regrade, and digitise feature-length Australian films (over 60 minutes) that were otherwise inaccessible or at risk of deterioration.

In September 2016, actor Claudia Karvan was announced as the foundation's official ambassador to support public fundraising campaigns aimed at digitising classic Australian cinema. Alongside advisory support for filmmakers seeking to digitise screen content, the foundation also hosted the OzFlix Independent Film Awards to recognise independent Australian film and television production.

== Closure ==
According to filings with the Australian Charities and Not-for-profits Commission (ACNC), the foundation struggled to secure major philanthropic or government grants, recording $14,713 in total revenue and $0 in distributed grants during its 2019 reporting period. Following the closure of OzFlix, the foundation ceased operations and its charity registration was subsequently revoked by the ACNC.
