= Natural Justice: Heat =

- Written by: Beverley Blankenship; Michael Brindley; Leon Saunders
- Directed by: Scott Hartford-Davis
- Starring: Claudia Karvan; John Moore; Sonia Todd; Steve Bastoni; Jeremy Sims
- Music by: Mario Millo
- Country of origin: Australia
- Original language: English

Production
- Producers: Paul D. Barron; Jan Tyrell; Bill Hughes
- Cinematography: Russell Bacon
- Editor: Christopher Spurr
- Running time: 93 mins
- Production company: Barron Entertainment

Original release
- Release: 1996

Natural Justice: Heat (or Heat) is a 1996 Australian telemovie drama about a motorcycle-riding lawyer, Asta Cadell, who heads to the rural Western Australia town of York. The film details police corruption, racism, violence and murder. Claudia Karvan stars in the lead role, which had previously been portrayed by Deborra-Lee Furness in the feature film, Shame (1988). Also in the cast are Sonia Todd as Jennifer Harivald, who is murdered; Steve Bastoni as Paul Tancred, a police sergeant who arrests Dacey Feguson (John Moore) for the crime and Jeremy Sims as Gavin Larson, a constable who brutalizes the Aboriginal townsfolk.

It was partly financed by Film Finance Corporation Australia and Screenwest with production by Barron Entertainment's Paul Barron, Billy Hughes and Jan Tyrell. Filming had occurred from 15 January to 15 February 1996 with Scott Hartford-Davis directing. A reviewer with VPRO determined, "It is clichéd because it contains the usual racist attitude of white Australians towards their indigenous people."

The telemovie was proposed as the first instalment of a Natural Justice trilogy, featuring the character, Asta Cadell. Both Natural Justice: The Mad Hatters of Mount Manjara and Natural Justice: Devil and the Deep Blue Sea, were in production during 1997.

== Cast ==
Credits:

- Claudia Karvan as Asta Cadell
- John Moore as Dacey Ferguson
- Sonia Todd as Jennifer Harivald
- Steve Bastoni as Paul Tancred
- Jeremy Sims as Gavin Larsen
- Martin Jacobs as Clive Harivald
- Blair Venn as Detective Quinlan
- Wendy Strehlow as Council clerk
