= Freedom (1982 film) =

- Film poster
- Directed by: Scott Hicks
- Written by: John Emery
- Produced by: Matt Carroll
- Starring: Jon Blake; Jad Capelja
- Cinematography: Ron Johanson
- Edited by: Philip Reid
- Production companies: South Australian Film Corporation; Endeavour Communications Corporation
- Distributed by: Roadshow
- Release date: 1 April 1982
- Running time: 102 mins
- Country: Australia
- Language: English
- Box office: A$157,000

Freedom is a 1982 Australian feature film directed by Scott Hicks, starring Jon Blake and Jad Capelja. It features the music of Don Walker and vocals by Michael Hutchence.

== Plot ==
Ron is an Adelaide man in his early 20s struggling to find work after he is laid off from his machinist apprenticeship. Though his crass manner has been a hindrance, Ron blames others for blocking his dreams. He fantasises about driving a coastal road in a Porsche 911 with a woman in the passenger seat, following a black sedan driving erratically before driving into a ravine. Ron can sweet-talk his way into favourable situations, including joyriding in a Triumph Stag under the pretence of a test-drive.

Ron sees the Porsche from his dreams near his house. The driver is an old school friend, Annie. The two agree to meet later in the city, but when Ron overhears Annie on the phone implying she will seduce him to spite her lover, Ron steals the Porsche and leaves Adelaide.

Ron meets Sally at a service station. She asks if Ron can take her to Sedan, South Australia. She plans to retrieve her son who is in foster care there. Sally tries to snatch her son, but Ron aborts the plan when he hears police arriving, and he and Sally escape.

Ron accidentally runs down a policeman while escaping, and regrets his escapades. The following morning, Ron leaves a sleeping Sally and draws the police away from a nearby roadblock, but damages the Porsche's engine in the process. He finds himself on the same coast road from his dreams, even finding the black sedan wrecked at the bottom of the ravine. Noticing the incoming police, Ron pushes the Porsche into the ravine and escapes by hitchhiking back to retrieve Sally.

== Cast ==
- Jon Blake as Ron
- Jad Capelja as Sally
- Candy Raymond as Annie
- Bud Tingwell as Cassidy
- Max Cullen as factory clerk
- Chris Haywood as Phil
- John Clayton as CES Officer
- Reg Lye as old farmer

== Production ==
The movie was shot in May to June 1981 in the Adelaide area. Finance was provided by the South Australian Film Corporation, with additional investment from Filmco.

Scott Hicks later described making the film as:

A very mixed experience. On the one hand, it was heady and exciting and intoxicating to be making your first feature film but, on the other, there were difficulties in the way the production was organised. The writer, John Emery, and I were kept separate from each other. In retrospect this was a huge blunder because the film was never totally focused in its vision, and I think that's reflected a little in the sort of schizophrenic nature of the film.

== Reception ==
Freedom was unsuccessful at the Australian box office and failed to generate attention internationally, aside from a run at the D. W. Griffith theatre in New York City on 14 February 1985. Domestically, the film grossed $157,000 in 1982, equivalent to $456,870 in 2009 dollars.

Critical reviews were mixed to negative. Susie Eisenhuth, writing for The Sun-Herald, compared the film to Terrence Malick's Badlands (1973), another love on the run film. She wrote that Freedom spends "too much time on cars" and too little time on its characters. Neil Jillett in The Age wrote one of the few positive reviews, stating that the film is about "the fantasies and fears of the young and unemployed", and called it "whimsical and intriguing".

== Home media ==
Freedom was released on VHS in the mid 1980s by Rigby Entertainment and was classified M15+. It was released on DVD in the 2000s by Umbrella Entertainment. It has been in and out of print since then. In the US, it was released on VHS by VidAmerica.

== Soundtrack ==
The film featured music by Cold Chisel's Don Walker and vocals by the lead singer of INXS, Michael Hutchence, backed by Liz Watters and Jason Currie. A single, "Speed Kills" was released by WEA Records in April 1982. The soundtrack was released as an album and featured members of Cold Chisel and Michael Hutchence.

It was described in The Age as, "the best rock music written for an Australian movie." Roadrunner called it "an intriguing and oddly compelling mainly instrumental soundtrack album that more than stands on its own merits."

Freedom

Soundtrack album by Don Walker and various artists
- Released: 1982
- Studio: Paradise Studios
- Label: WEA
- Producer: Don Walker

Singles from Freedom
- 1. "Speed Kills" Released: April 1982

=== Track listing ===
- All tracks performed by Don Walker unless otherwise noted

Side A
No.	Title	Writer(s)	Length
1.	"Port Adelaide"	Don Walker
2.	"Speed Kills" (performed by Michael Hutchence and Don Walker)	Walker
3.	"Port Adelaide II"	Walker
4.	"Freedom Theme"	Walker
5.	"Sedan Hoot"	Walker, David Blight

Side B
No.	Title	Writer(s)	Length
1.	"Eleuptheria" (performed by Jason Currie)	Walker
2.	"Fascist Sounds" (performed by Ian Moss and Liz Waters)	Walker
3.	"Last Stretch"	Walker, Moss
4.	"Forest Theme" (performed by Michael Hutchence)	Walker
