= Alex Carey (writer) =

Australian psychologist

- Born: Alexander Edward Carey; 1 December 1922
- Died: 30 November 1987 (aged 64); Sydney, New South Wales, Australia
- Education: Hale School, Perth; University of London
- Occupations: Writer; psychologist; academic
- Years active: 1958–1987
- Children: 3, including Gabrielle

Alexander Edward Carey (1 December 1922 – 30 November 1987) was an Australian social psychologist and university lecturer who analysed corporate propaganda. Carey influenced Noam Chomsky and Edward S. Herman; he was called a "second Orwell in his prophesies" by Australian journalist John Pilger.

== Biography ==
Carey was raised in Geraldton, Western Australia, to parents Henry Carey, of Irish ancestry, and Erica Hester, of a Scottish Protestant family. His parents were first cousins. Carey had four siblings, including a twin brother, Godfrey, who died when he was seven (1922–1930). At twelve, Carey left home (White Peak) for boarding school in Perth. Following his graduation the headmaster of the school made the trip to White Peak to convince Carey's parents that he should go on to university. However, Carey stayed in White Peak until he sold the family property, before enrolling at London University in the 1950s. He had served as a gunner in the Royal Australian Artillery's 3rd Field Regiment from September 1941 to March 1943.

From 1958 until his death, he was a lecturer in psychology at the University of New South Wales. The main subjects of his lectures and research were industrial psychology, industrial relations, and the psychology of nationalism and propaganda. He was one of the founding members of the Australian Humanist Society in 1960. In the 1970s, Carey was prominent in the protest movement against Australian participation in the Vietnam War. He was the father of the Australian writer, Gabrielle Carey.

In 1988, Noam Chomsky and Edward S. Herman published their Manufacturing Consent: The Political Economy of the Mass Media in dedication to the memory of Carey. Claiming that it was Carey who had inspired their work, Chomsky has said, "The real importance of Carey's work is that it's the first effort, and until now the major effort, to bring some of [the history of corporate propaganda] to public attention. It's had a tremendous influence on the work I've done."

According to Noam Chomsky, Carey pioneered the study of corporate propaganda. Much of Carey's work in this area remained unpublished and was cut short by his death. In 1995, a collection of his essays (several of them previously unpublished) were published under the title, Taking the Risk Out of Democracy: Propaganda in the U.S. and Australia (University of New South Wales Press; reissued in 1997 by University of Illinois Press under the title Taking the Risk Out of Democracy: Corporate Propaganda versus Freedom and Liberty).

Carey collaborated with Noam Chomsky, studying with him at the Massachusetts Institute of Technology (MIT) for twelve months in 1978 and meeting with him again while on a sabbatical in the United States during the last year of his life.

Carey committed suicide in 1987. Members of his family speculated that his reasons included substantial financial losses in the stock market crash of that year and a battle with depression in his final years.

== Bibliography ==
Books

- (1995) Taking the Risk Out of Democracy: Propaganda in the U.S. and Australia – University of New South Wales Press
- (1996) Taking the Risk Out of Democracy: Corporate Propaganda vs. Freedom and Liberty – Edited by Andrew Lohrey – University of Illinois Press

Selected academic articles

- (1967) The Hawthorne Studies: A Radical Criticism – American Sociological Review – Vol. 32, No. 3, pp. 403–416
- (1977) The Lysenko Syndrome In Western Social Science – Australian Psychologist, Vol. 12, No. 1, pp. 27–38
- (1979) The Norwegian Experiments In Democracy at Work: A Critique and a Contribution to Reflexive Sociology – The Australian and New Zealand Journal of Sociology – Vol. 15, No. 1, p. 13–23
- (1980) Word-Power In Politics: "Terror," "Aggression," and "Refugees" in the Semantics of Violence and Repression – ETC: A Review of General Semantics — Vol. 37, No. 1, pp. 53–64

Selected essays

- (1965) What Is Humanism?: Humanism and Action – Outlook, Vol. 9, No. 1
- (1968) Of Professors and 'Pacification' – Kirrawee, pp. 1–7
- (1968) Australian Atrocities In Vietnam – Vietnam Action Campaign, pp. 1–20
- (1968) The Generations Gap – Meanjin Quarterly, Vol. 27, No. 3, pp. 375–381
- (1971) How To Win A People's War – Tharunka, Vol. 17, No. 3, pp. 1–3
- (1973) Clockwork Vietnam: Gaining Physical Control – Meanjin Quarterly, Vol. 32, No. 1, pp. 45–54
- (1973) Clockwork Vietnam II: The Social Engineers Take Over – Meanjin Quarterly, Vol. 32, No. 4, pp. 406–418
- (1976) Reshaping the Truth: Pragmatists and Propagandists in America – Meanjin Quarterly, Vol. 35, No. 4, pp. 370–378
- (1984) Cost Benefits of Being a Nuclear Target: Australia's Best Defence Seen In Building Up Our Own Services – The Mercury, p. 8
- (1987) The Ideological Management Industry – Communications and the Media, pp. 156–179 – Edited by E. L. Wheelwright, K. D. Buckley – Allen & Unwin
- (1987) – Conspiracy Or Groundswell? – The New Right's Australian Fantasy, pp. 3–19 – Edited by Ken Coghill – McPhee Gribble, Penguin Books

== Notes ==
Notes

Citations
