= The Last Resort (1988 TV series) =

- Genre: Drama
- Created by: Louis Nowra
- Written by: Bert Deling; Tim Gooding; Gabrielle Lord; Louis Nowra; Johanna Pigott; Leon Saunders
- Directed by: Ron Elliott; Colin Englert; Peter Fisk; Denny Lawrence; Geoffrey Nottage; Deborah Richards; Mike Smith; Kate Woods
- Starring: Kate Fitzpatrick; Kris McQuade; Nell Schofield; Paul Chubb
- Composer: Martin Armiger
- Country of origin: Australia
- Original language: English
- No. of seasons: 1
- No. of episodes: 30

Production
- Executive producer: Jan Chapman
- Producer: Wayne Barry

Original release
- Network: Australian Broadcasting Corporation
- Release: 27 April – 13 December 1988

The Last Resort was an Australian television drama series which originally screened by the Australian Broadcasting Corporation (ABC). The show premiered on 27 April 1988 and ended 13 December 1988 for a total of 30 weekly episodes of fifty minutes each. The series was created and co-written by Louis Nowra. The plot revolves around three adult sisters, Elizabeth Parker (Kate Fitzpatrick), Jennifer Shannon (Kris McQuade), and Louise Shannon (Nell Schofield), who attempt to live together and help in the management of the dilapidated seaside Hotel Isis. The series is set in Sydney's Bondi area and was "part of the initiative to increase the network's Australian drama output to 100 hours for [the year]." The series suffered scathing reviews, which contributed to its cancellation after the first season.

== Production ==
The series was created and written by Louis Nowra. It was produced by Jan Chapman and Wayne Barry with Bert Deling, Tim Gooding, Gabrielle Lord and Johanna Pigott as scriptwriters; it was directed by Geoffrey Nottage, Ron Elliott, Denny Lawrence, Colin Englert and Kate Woods. It was filmed at Langley Place Studios, the former GIO building, which The Sydney Morning Herald's Robin Oliver described as, "a building where the leaking roof is supported on a mass of internal columns – a nightmare for camera operators and set decorators – where the floor can be flooded in any decent rainstorm, where the ceiling is so low that the lighting can almost singe the hair of the actors, and where outside broadcast vans have had to be brought in."

== Cast ==
=== Main ===
- Kate Fitzpatrick as Elizabeth Parker
- Kris McQuade as Jennifer Shannon
- Nell Schofield as Louise Shannon
- Paul Chubb as Hilary Davis
- Juliet Jordan as Ama
- Wyn Roberts as Exeter Shannon
- Les Foxcroft
- Grigor Taylor as Len
- Clarissa Kaye-Mason
- Claudia Karvan as Emma Parker
- Joe Petruzzi
- Betty Lucas
- Christian Manon as Jean-Claude
- May Pusey as Betty
- Wayne Pygram
- Loene Carmen as Megan Small
- Rod Zuanic as Rod Hunter
- Yuko as Yukio
- Susan Deling
- Ivar Kants
- Charles Tingwell

=== Guests ===
- Helen Scott
- Grigor Taylor as Len
- Ken Welsh as Insurance Valuer

== Music ==
The series featured original music by Martin Armiger, with orchestrations and additional music by Derek Williams.

== Episodes ==
1. "Coming Home" (27 April 1988)
2. "The First Day" (4 May 1988)
3. "Winners & Grinners" (11 May 1988)
4. "Ghosts" (18 May 1988)
5. "An Absence of Love" (25 May 1988)
6. Episode 6 (1 June 1988)
7. "Guess Who's Coming to Dinner?" (8 June 1988)
8. "Sayonara" (15 June 1988)
9. "Noah's Ark" (29 June 1988)
10. Episode 10 (6 July 1988)
11. "Through a Crystal Darkly" (13 July 1988)
12. "Ties that Bind" (20 July 1988)
13. "Fire from the Sea" (27 July 1988)
14. "Under the Volcano" (3 August 1988)
15. Episode 15 (10 August 1988)
16. Episode 16 (17 August 1988)
17. Episode 17 (24 August 1988)
18. Episode 18 (31 August 1988)
19. "Skeletons in the Cupboard" (7 September 1988)
20. "Legal Niceties" (21 September 1988)
21. "Castles in the Air" (28 September 1988)
22. "Time of the Tiger" (11 October 1988)
23. "Rats in the Attic" (18 October 1988)
24. "Suspicions" (25 October 1988)
25. "Something Dead in the Tank" (1 November 1988)
26. "Happy Families" (8 November 1988)
27. Episode 27 (22 November 1988)
28. Episode 28 (29 November 1988)
29. "Wedding Bells" (6 December 1988)
30. "Once Upon a Time" (13 December 1988)

== Critical reception ==
In a contemporary review, David Vine of The Canberra Times summarised, "If they handed out Golden Turkey awards for television in Australia, there is little doubt The Last Resort on the ABC would be up there with the best of them. Though acclaimed almost universally as a disaster of epic proportions. I heard it promoted, rather desperately, as a 'sensuous Australian drama'. There are many things The Last Resort is not – and sensuous is one of them." Nowra's memoir, Shooting the Moon (2004), was reviewed by Brenda Niall of The Age, and she describes how "His work on The Last Resort with ABC producer Jan Chapman and writer Tim Gooding ended badly. Using cocaine and alcohol to keep up the pace of writing a 30-episode series, Nowra became aggressive and abusive. The series was a disaster."

The Canberra Times' Jeannie Zakharov reviewed ABC's shows for 1988 and concluded, "...the national broadcaster did not have much luck with bombs like the shortlived Gerry Connelly Show... and the aptly named The Last Resort, which finally ground to a halt last week..." Susan Lever of National Centre for Australian Studies at Monash University discussed the works of Nowra and addressed the criticism of The Last Resort, "I was one of the viewers who thought [it was] fascinating and found its very mix of styles led to almost obligatory viewing during its run. I remember with particular fondness the scene in which the mother was struck by lightning while playing lawn bowls – a wonderful parody of the way characters are disposed of in conventional soaps. [The series] goes down in the annals as a failure not only because it did not win audiences... but because it also attracted critical damnation... Critical damnation, final though it seems, really is as transient as television broadcasting itself."

More recent descriptions include The Age's Brenda Niall in 2004, who discussed Nowra's work "[it] ended badly ... [he] became aggressive and abusive. The series was a disaster." Also in 2004 Susan Lever of National Centre for Australian Studies, "thought [it was] fascinating and found its very mix of styles led to almost obligatory viewing during its run" and that, "Critical damnation, final though it seems, really is as transient as television broadcasting itself."
