= Brenna Harding =

Australian actor (born 1996)

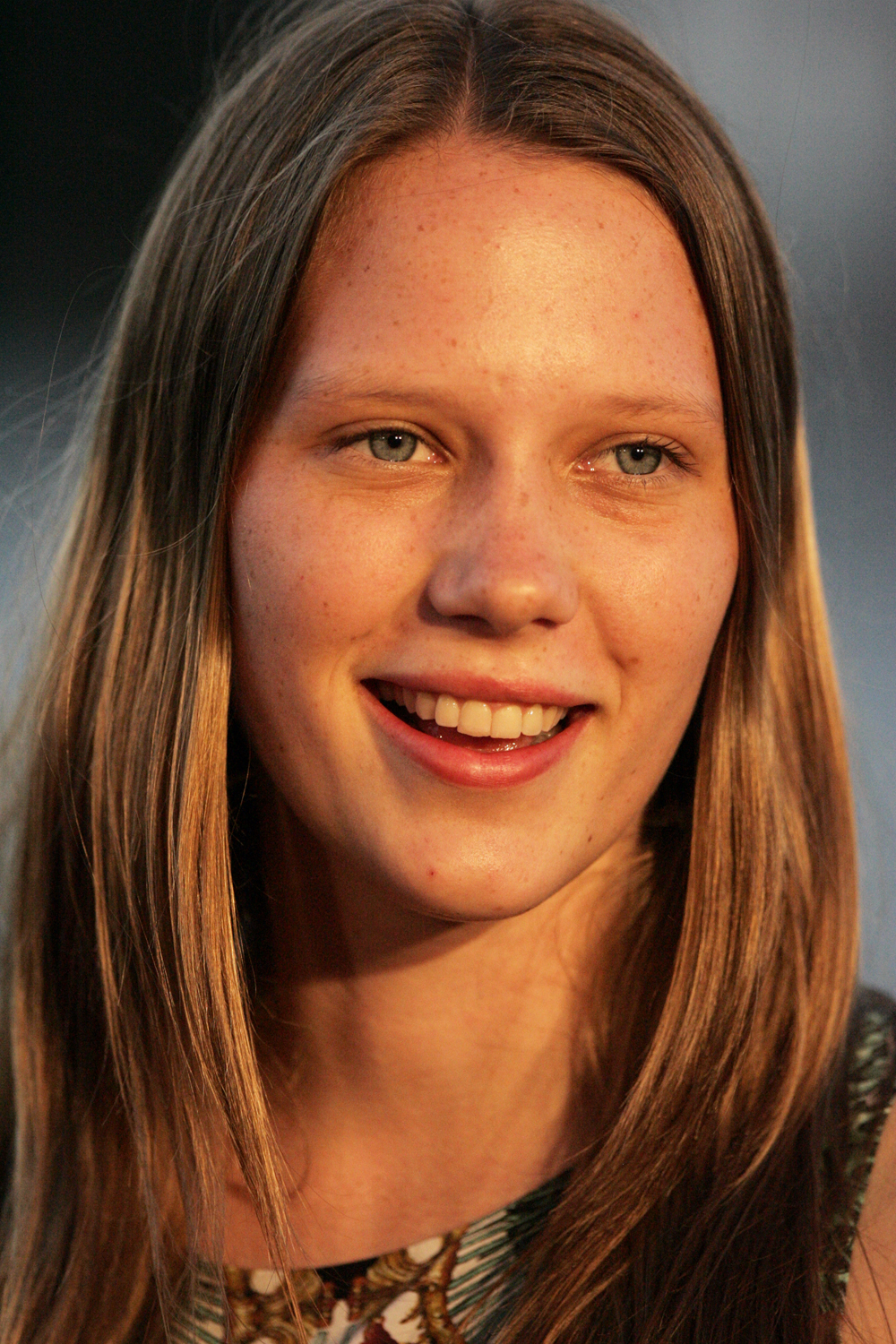
- Harding at the opening night of Anna Karenina in 2013
- Born: 19 May 1996 (age 30); Australia
- Occupation: Actor
- Years active: 2004–present

Brenna Harding (born 19 May 1996) is an Australian actor, best known for her role as Sue Knight in the television series Puberty Blues, and her role in "Arkangel", an episode in the anthology series Black Mirror.

== Career ==
Harding's first television appearance was in 2004, appearing in a clip for Play School's "Through the Window" segment. The clip showed Harding and her two mothers on a trip to an amusement park, and attracted controversy from the media and politicians for showing homosexual parents.

Harding began performing in the late 2000s through holiday drama courses, then moved on to television roles with an appearance in My Place and a three-episode run in season 3 of Packed to the Rafters. Her first major television role was as Sue Knight in Puberty Blues, one of the two teenage girls who were the main characters of the 1979 novel of the same name. Harding's role in the series led to her receiving the 2013 Logie Award for Most Popular New Female Talent, as well as being nominated for the 2013 Logie Award for Most Outstanding Newcomer, and nominated for the AACTA Award for Best Young Actor at the 2nd AACTA Awards in 2013. In 2017, she appeared in "Arkangel", an episode in the series Black Mirror.

== Philanthropy ==
Harding is a campaigner for LGBTQ rights, appearing with her mothers before the 2009 New South Wales parliamentary inquiry into same-sex adoption reform. As of 2012, she was the president of gay rights group "Wear it Purple". She is also credited as one of the authors of the children's books The Rainbow Cubby House, Koalas on Parade, Going to Fair Day and My House, along with her mother Vicki. In 2015, Brenna founded Sydney-based feminist collective Moonlight Feminists.

== Filmography ==
=== Television ===
Year	Title	Role	Notes
2004	Play School	Herself	"Through the Window" segment
2009	My Place	Kath	Episode: "1928 Bridie"
2010	Packed to the Rafters	Georgia	3 episodes
2012-2014	Puberty Blues	Sue Knight	Series regular
2015	A Place to Call Home	Rosie O'Connell	Recurring (series 3), series regular (series 4); 22 episodes
2016	Secret City	Cassie	4 episodes
2016	The Code	Alyse Baxter	4 episodes
2017	Black Mirror	Sara	Episode: "Arkangel"
2018	Talkin' 'Bout Your Generation	Herself	Episode: Season 5, Episode 1
2019	Glitch	Nia Hayes	
2020	Total Control	Officer Riley	3 episodes
2020-2022	First Day	Ms Fraser	
2022	The Twelve	Yvie	3 episodes

=== Film ===
Year	Title	Role	Notes
2011	Shelling Pass	Amy	Short
2013	The Road Home	Girl with Reindeer Ears	Short
2013	Turning	Anges	Segment: "Cockleshell"
2017	Floc	Hannah	Short
2017	Bring Me Back, Ma	Alicia	Short
