= The Rainbow Cubby House =

Book in a series by Brenna Harding

- Author: Brenna and Vicki Harding
- Illustrator: Chris Bray Cotton
- Language: English
- Genre: Children's literature, LGBT literature
- Published: 2005 (Bulldog Books)
- Publication place: Australia
- Media type: Print (Paperback)
- Pages: 12 pages (paperback)
- ISBN: 0-9581290-2-9
- OCLC: 236352923
- Preceded by: Going to Fair Day
- Followed by: Koalas on Parade

The Rainbow Cubby House is the third book in the Learn to Include series, written by Brenna Harding and her lesbian mother Vicki (who could not find any readers featuring same-sex families to donate to her daughter's school). It is for beginner readers or for reading aloud.

The book is about the narrator Brenna, her two mums, her friend Jed and his two dads building a cubby house in the backyard.

The series, and this book in particular, were at the centre of a controversy involving a day care centre using books that feature characters from same-sex parent families. New South Wales Premier Morris Iemma said of the issue: "I do not personally believe it appropriate for two-year-olds to be dragged into the gay rights debate."

== See also ==
- Heather Has Two Mommies: similar book with more controversy in the United States
- LGBTQ literature in Australia
