= Gabrielle Carey =

Australian writer (1959–2023)

- Born: 10 January 1959; Sydney, New South Wales, Australia
- Died: 2 May 2023 (aged 64); Sydney, New South Wales, Australia
- Education: University of Sydney
- Occupation: Writer
- Known for: Novelist, journalist
- Father: Alex Carey

Gabrielle Carey (10 January 1959 – 2 May 2023) was an Australian writer. She is known for co-writing the teen novel, Puberty Blues with Kathy Lette, when they were both teenagers. She also taught creative writing at University of Technology Sydney.

== Early life and education ==
Gabrielle Carey was born on 10 January 1959 in Sydney, New South Wales, and was raised in an atheist, humanist household. Her father was writer Alex Carey.

Carey met Kathy Lette at the age of 12 while still at school and they became best friends. Both left school early (Carey at 15 and Lette a year later) against the wishes of their families.

== Career ==
After leaving home while still teenagers, Carey and Lette shared a flat and wrote Puberty Blues together. The novel, based on the lives of young male surfers in Sydney and their girlfriends, was the first teenage novel published in Australia written by teenagers. The novel shocked many people by its graphic description of teenage behaviour. Once the book was published Carey and Lette separated and their lives moved in different directions. In 1981, Bruce Beresford directed a film adaptation of the novel.

Carey and Lette also wrote a column for The Sun-Herald under the name "The Salami Sisters".

A telefilm version of Carey's autobiographical book, Just Us, an account of her relationship with Parramatta Gaol prisoner, Terry Haley, was made in 1986. It was directed by Gordon Glenn from a screenplay by Ted Roberts.

Carey worked as a freelance writer, penning occasional articles for The Sydney Morning Herald and other newspapers. She also lectured at several universities throughout her life, including the University of Sydney and the University of Canberra. From around 2005 until 2020, she taught creative writing at the University of Technology Sydney. James Joyce and Randolph Stow were among her areas of research.

== Recognition ==
Moving Among Strangers won the Prime Minister's Literary Award in 2014.

Carey's 2020 book, Only Happiness Here, was shortlisted for the 2021 Nib Literary Award.

== Personal life and death ==
While in Ireland in the mid-1980s, Carey converted to Catholicism, becoming convinced of the importance of spirituality in everyday life. After a year in Ireland she left and for several years lived in a small village in Mexico, returning to Australia in the early 1990s.

She had a daughter and a son.

Carey took her own life on 2 May 2023, at the age of 64; her father had done the same at the same age.

In 2026, Carey's old school friend, writer Debra Adelaide, published a book of autofiction based on Carey, titled When I Am Sixty-Four.

== Bibliography ==
=== Novels ===
- Puberty Blues with Kathy Lette (McPhee Gribble, 1979) ISBN 0-86914-010-8
- The Borrowed Girl (Picador, 1994) ISBN 0-330-35598-8

=== Autobiography and memoir ===
- Just Us (Penguin Books, 1984) ISBN 0-14-007425-2
- In My Father's House (Pan Macmillan Publishers Australia, 1992) ISBN 0-330-27294-2
- Moving among Strangers: Randolph Stow and My Family (University of Queensland Press, 2013) ISBN 9780702249921
- Falling Out of Love with Ivan Southall (Australian Scholarly Publishing, 2018) ISBN 9781925801538

=== Other non-fiction ===
- The Penguin Book of Death with Rosemary Sorensen (Penguin Books, 1997) ISBN 0-14-025938-4
- So Many Selves (ABC Books, 2006) ISBN 978-0-7333-1982-2
- Waiting Room (Scribe Publications, 2009) ISBN 978-1-921372-62-9
- Only Happiness Here: In Search of Elizabeth von Arnim. St Lucia, Queensland: University of Queensland Press. 2020. ISBN 978-0-7022-6297-5.

=== Critical studies and reviews of Carey's work ===
- Roemhild, Juliane (January–February 2021). "[Review of Only Happiness Here] Writing Happiness: A Lively Look at Elizabeth von Arnim". Australian Book Review. 428: 50.
