= Jad Capelja =

Australian actress

- Born: Jadranka Capelja; 1965; Yugoslavia
- Died: 10 January 2010 (aged 44–45); Sydney, Australia
- Occupation: Actress
- Spouse: Richard Muecke (divorced)
- Children: 1

Jadranka Capelja (1965 – 10 January 2010) was a Yugoslavia-born Australian actress, best known for her role in the 1981 teen film Puberty Blues, based on the novel of the same name.

== Early life ==
Capjelja was born to parents, Stevan and Maria, in Yugoslavia in 1965. She emigrated with her family to Australia at the age of five. She lived with her parents in Sydney's Inner West in Annandale. Her parents became Australian citizens in 1978.

== Career ==
In 1981, she made her film debut in Bruce Beresford's coming-of-age film, Puberty Blues. She played Sue Knight, best friend of the protagonist, Debbie (played by Nell Schofield). Capelja and Schofield were chosen from among 490 young actresses that auditioned for the roles. The film was very successful in Australia, Schofield and Capelja became instant stars and were sent on a huge publicity tour around the country.

Capelja was later the female lead in Scott Hicks' 1982 road film Freedom set and filmed in South Australia. In the same year she also appeared in two episodes of TV drama series A Country Practice. These two performances and Puberty Blues are her only credited screen roles.

She was unsuccessful when applying to study at the National Institute of Dramatic Art to develop her acting. She attempted to continue her performing career by auditioning for other acting roles but struggled to get cast in new roles. She occasionally appeared in commercials and stage roles during the period. In 1987, she appeared in the play, The Pirates of Lake Burley Griffin at TAU in Canberra.

She later struggled with addiction and was diagnosed with paranoid schizophrenia.

== Personal life ==
She had a son, Miles Muecke, from her marriage to Richard Muecke. Miles became a lawyer and in recent years has worked as an MMA coach and founder of nutrition brand. Some of Capelja's relatives have settled in Vojka in Serbia.

She later struggled with addiction and was diagnosed with paranoid schizophrenia. In the time leading up to her death she was on a treatment plan and recognising her mental health difficulties.

=== Death ===
Capelja committed suicide by hanging in her Sydney apartment on 10 January 2010. Her Puberty Blues co-star Nell Schofield later observed that "it was probably very hard for her to accept that she wasn't going to have a career as an actress, that she wasn't going to be as famous or as big a star as she was when she was 16."

== Filmography ==
Year	Title	Role	Notes
1981	Puberty Blues	Sue Knight	Film; Dir. Bruce Beresford
1982	Freedom	Sally	Film; Dir. Scott Hicks
1982	A Country Practice	Nurse Cotteril	2 episodes
