= Just Us (film) =

- Based on: Just Us by Gabrielle Carey
- Written by: Ted Roberts
- Directed by: Gordon Glenn
- Starring: Scott Burgess; Catherine McClements
- Country of origin: Australia
- Original language: English

Production
- Producer: Peter Beilby
- Running time: 93 mins
- Production company: Entertainment Media

Original release
- Release: 1986

Just Us is a 1986 television film, based on a true story and the autobiography by Gabrielle Carey, of the same name. Set in Sydney, Australia, but filmed mainly in Melbourne, it starred Scott Burgess and Catherine McClements. It was written by Ted Roberts and directed by Gordon Glenn.

== Plot ==
The autobiography written by Gabrielle Carey tells her story of how she made the 'mistake' of falling in love with Terry Haley, a prison inmate at Parramatta Gaol.

The character's names were changed for the movie, in which, Jessica Taylor (McClements), a young journalist, is sent to a maximum security prison to watch a debate and gather up information for a story she is writing. It is there that she meets long-term prisoner Billy Carter (Burgess), and after a while, the pair fall in love and want to get married.

== Cast ==
- Scott Burgess as Billy Carter
- Catherine McClements as Jessica Taylor
- Gina Riley as Cathy
- Jay Mannering as Max
- Merfyn Owen as Royce
- Denis Moore as Christie
- Kym Gyngell as The Mouth
- Marie Redshaw as Mrs Carter
- Ron Pinnell as Mr Carter
- Peter Hosking as Sub-Editor

== Filming locations ==
Just Us was filmed in Melbourne, though set in Sydney and Adelaide. The locations of both Parramatta Gaol and Yatala Gaol was filmed using the exterior and interior of Old Melbourne Gaol. Other notable locations included:

- South Melbourne Rowing Club
- Kew Asylum
- Melbourne Magistrates' Court
- Brighton Junior Grammar School
