= Arkangel (Black Mirror) =

- Black Mirror episode
- Promotional poster released as part of the "13 Days of Black Mirror"
- Episode no.: Series 4 Episode 2
- Directed by: Jodie Foster
- Written by: Charlie Brooker
- Cinematography by: Ed Wild
- Editing by: Jinx Godfrey
- Original release date: 29 December 2017
- Running time: 52 minutes

Guest appearances
- Rosemarie DeWitt as Marie Sambrell; Brenna Harding as Sara Sambrell; Nicholas Campbell as Russ Sambrell; Owen Teague as Trick; Aniya Hodge as Sara (age 3); Sarah Abbott as Sara (age 9); Nicky Torchia as Trick (age 12)

Episode chronology
← Previous "USS Callister"	Next → "Crocodile"

"Arkangel" is the second episode of the fourth series of the British science fiction anthology series Black Mirror. Written by series creator and showrunner Charlie Brooker and directed by Jodie Foster, it premiered on Netflix on 29 December 2017, along with the rest of series four. In the episode, the single mother Marie (Rosemarie DeWitt) enrolls her daughter Sara in a trial of Arkangel, an implanted technology which allows Marie to track Sara's location, current vision and hearing, and automatically censors distressing material.

The main theme of the episode is helicopter parenting; as a woman raised by a single mother, Foster had many views which influenced the script, such as a more complex characterisation of Marie, and was given control of casting. For the filming in November 2016, Foster chose a location in Canada to represent working-class America. Differently aged versions of Sara are played by different actors, with Brenna Harding playing her as a teenager.

Critics saw Marie as a parent afflicted with much anxiety and guilt and compared Arkangel to existing technologies for child monitoring, such as microchip implants and smartwatches. They were mostly laudatory of Foster's directing style and DeWitt's acting but less complimentary of the storyline and moral, which were seen as simplistic, with many reviewers suggesting themes the episode could have explored in more detail. In one scene, a nurse incorrectly implies that an emergency contraception (EC) pill induces abortion, rather than preventing pregnancy. The episode was poorly received in comparison to other Black Mirror episodes.

== Plot ==
Single mother Marie Sambrell (Rosemarie DeWitt) gives birth to her daughter Sara and raises her with help from Sara's grandfather, Russ (Nicholas Campbell). Three-year-old Sara (Aniya Hodge) gets lost following a cat and a distressed Marie has to enlist help from neighbours to locate her. Afterwards, Marie signs her up for a trial of Arkangel, a child monitoring system installed via an implant. Marie can monitor Sara's vision and hearing with a tablet computer, along with viewing live medical data and past audiovisual feeds. A filter can censor stimuli when they cause Sara stress, such as an intimidating neighbourhood dog. Shortly after, Russ survives a stroke, because Marie is notified when Sara, observing Russ, experiences stress.

Six years later, Russ has died. A classmate named Ryan "Trick" Tribecky (Nicky Torchia) tries to show Sara (Sarah Abbott) sexual and violent imagery but the filter blurs it. Sara draws blood from her finger, trying to learn what it looks like, so Marie has her assessed by a psychologist who recommends that she dispose of Arkangel, which is soon to be banned. Marie deactivates the filter and stores the tablet in the attic. An anxious Sara goes to school unsupervised and Trick shows her pornography and gore videos.

Aged fifteen, Sara (Brenna Harding) lies to her mother about going to a friend's house to attend a party with Trick (Owen Teague). Marie discovers the lie and after failing to contact her, turns on Arkangel. She sees Sara having sex for the first time, with Trick. Marie starts to use the tablet again and soon sees Sara snorting cocaine that Trick—who deals drugs—gives her.

Identifying Trick with a reverse image search, Marie confronts him at work and blackmails him to stay away from Sara. After receiving an Arkangel notification that Sara is pregnant, Marie sneaks an emergency contraceptive pill into Sara's smoothie. She later vomits and is told by a nurse that the pill caused it. Sara confronts Marie and forces the tablet away from her. The stress filter is accidentally reactivated. Unable to see the damage she is causing, Sara beats Marie unconscious with the tablet, breaking it.

The filter deactivates and Sara runs away. When Marie regains consciousness, she frantically yells for Sara down the street. A hitch-hiking Sara gets into a truck.

== Production ==
Whilst series one and two of Black Mirror were shown on Channel 4 in the UK, in September 2015 Netflix commissioned the series for 12 episodes, and in March 2016 it outbid Channel 4 for the rights to distribute the series in the UK, with a bid of $40 million. The 12-episode order was divided into two series of six episodes each, with "Arkangel" in the latter group. The six episodes in series four were released on Netflix simultaneously on 29 December 2017. "Arkangel" is listed as the second episode, but as Black Mirror is an anthology series, each instalment can be watched in any order.

=== Writing ===
The episode was written by series creator Charlie Brooker. Executive producer Annabel Jones said that it was inspired by microchip implants used to identify pets that, at the time of writing, were also being considered for children. Jones said, "We wanted to think what the updated version of that [was] and find a really good idea of how that could go terribly wrong". The episode is intended to be sympathetic to helicopter parenting; Brooker took inspiration in how protective he felt following the birth of his children. Prior to having children, Brooker thought negatively of content restrictions designed for children, but he was concerned by his three-year-old son seeing a horror movie trailer after he left him alone with YouTube on autoplay. He was also concerned by thoughts of his children seeing an accident or hearing profanity in their day-to-day life.

=== Director and casting ===
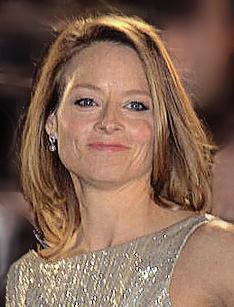
"Arkangel" was directed by Jodie Foster, making it the first episode of Black Mirror to be directed by a woman.

The actor, director and producer Jodie Foster directed Black Mirror; previous credits included episodes of the Netflix series Orange Is the New Black and House of Cards. Foster was introduced to Black Mirror by Netflix's vice president of original content after telling her that she enjoyed directing short but complete stories, in contrast to serialised television programmes. Brooker saw Foster as suited to "Arkangel" because as a former child actor, she would understand what it was like to grow up in the spotlight. Foster was raised by a single mother, and said that the script brought up "so many questions about who we are as women at this particular time in history". She was the first woman to direct a Black Mirror episode.

Foster was in control of casting the episode and also hiring much of the production crew. She cast her friend Rosemarie DeWitt as Marie. The pair had met through Foster's wife Alexandra Hedison; this was only the second time Foster had directed a friend, after Mel Gibson in the 2011 film The Beaver. The Australian actor Brenna Harding was cast as Sara, after misinterpreting part of the audition tape instructions and performing a two-minute monologue in the character of Sara, rather than as herself. The three other children cast as younger versions of Sara had to be chosen to look very similar to Harding. Foster was experienced in directing child actors and said that much of the skill lay in casting. Owen Teague's role as Trick influenced the character: though written as a character to be distrusted, Foster said that Teague has "sweetness" and Harding described Trick and Sara as "like two old souls who connected".

The original script gave Marie's father only a very minor part, but this was fleshed out by Foster. She also influenced other changes in the script, and offered many observations on the technology used and Marie's motivation for her actions after seeing her daughter have sex with Trick. In contrast to Jones and Brooker's more positive conception of Marie, Foster was informed by her life experience to show a darkness to her character. Explaining the actions of her character Marie, DeWitt said that single mothers "experience betrayal differently". Foster added that when Marie realises Sara is lying to her but does not confront her, it causes a "fissure" and Marie begins "fighting a battle to win control". By attempting to prevent her daughter from leaving her, Marie is victim to a self-fulfilling prophecy as she "engendered the exact result that she most feared".

=== Filming and editing ===
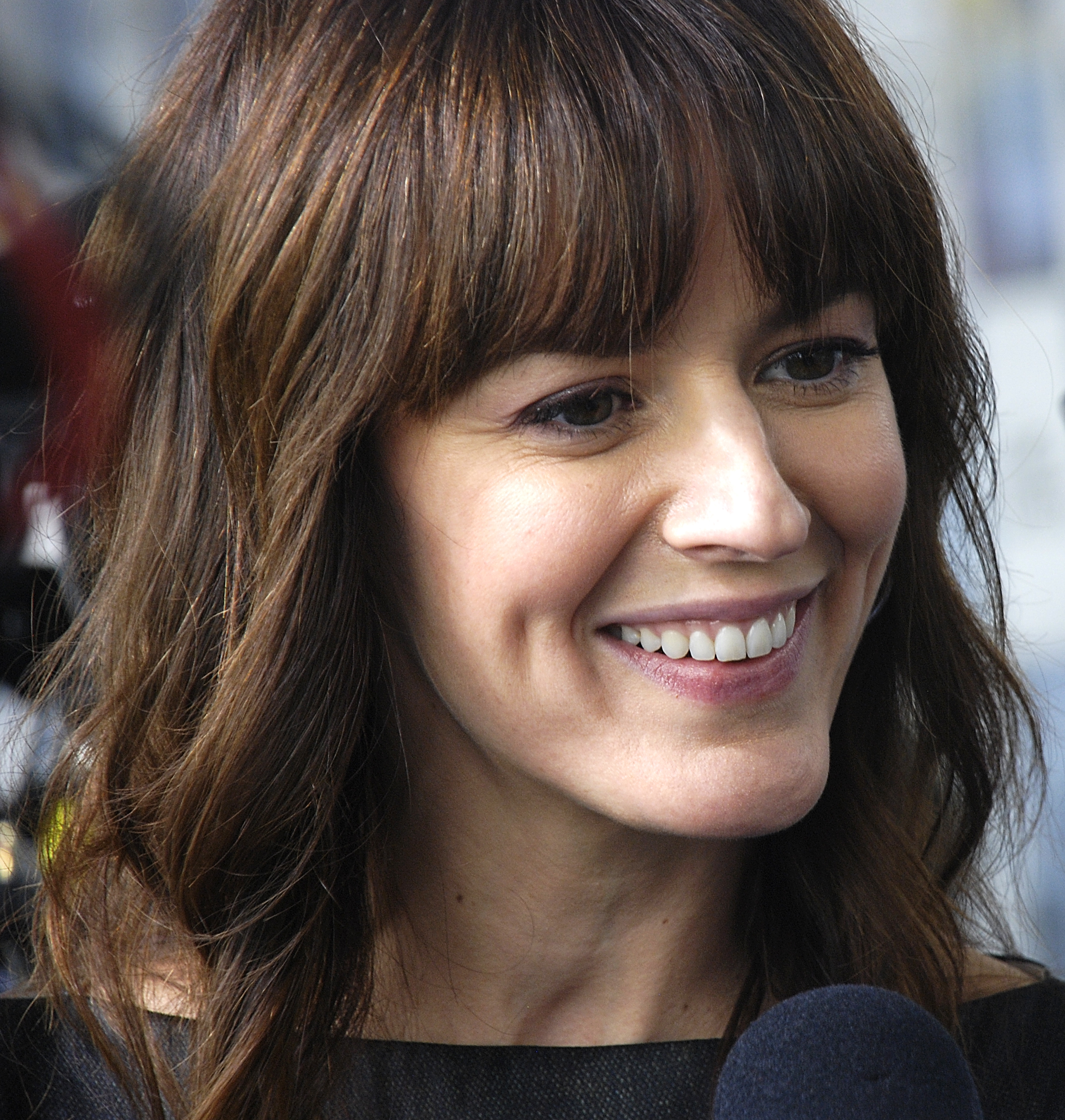
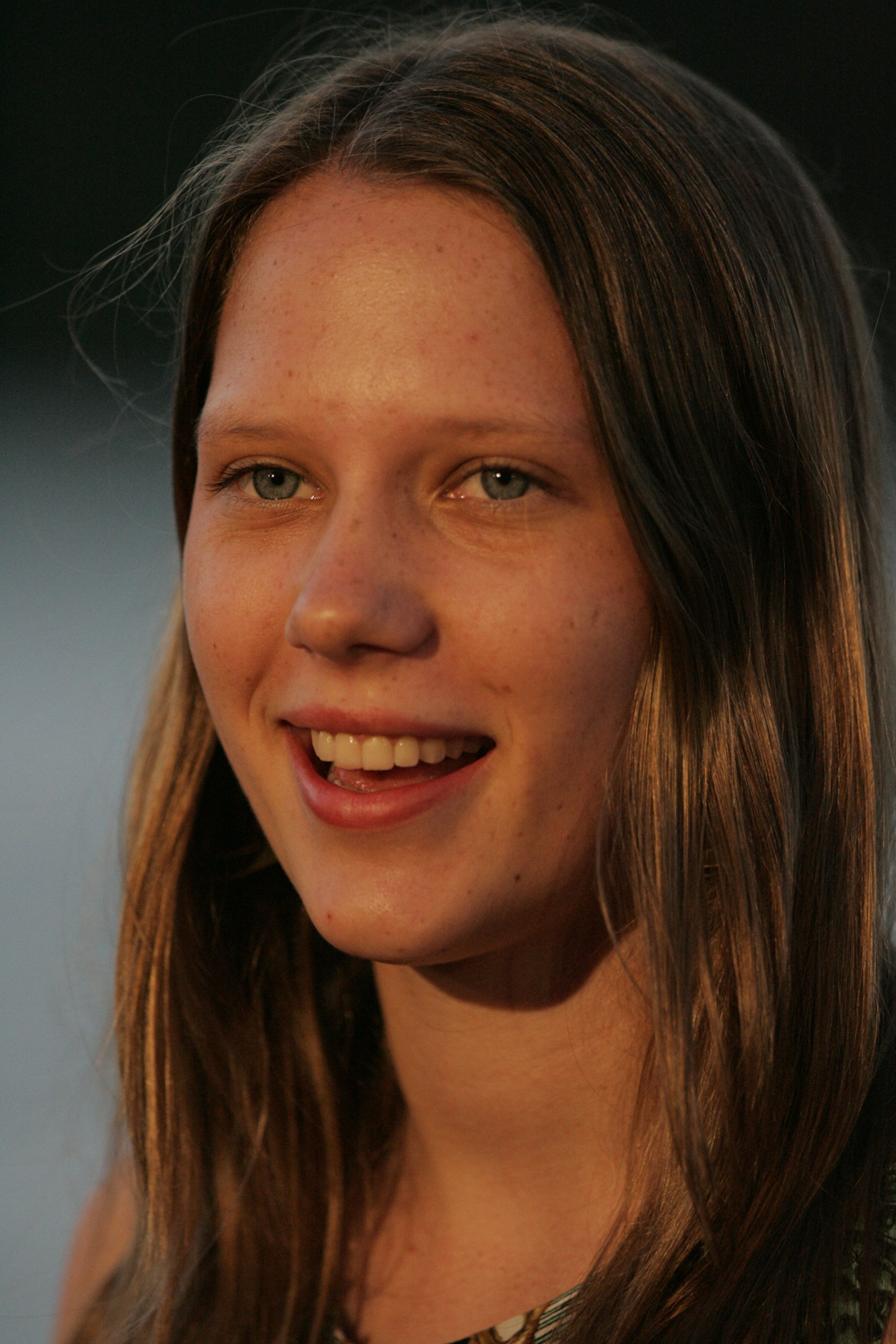
Rosemarie DeWitt (left) starred as Marie while Brenna Harding (right) starred as her daughter Sara during her teenage years.

The episode was filmed across three weeks in November 2016. A location in Hamilton, Ontario, was chosen by Foster to depict blue-collar America. Jones was present for filming but Brooker was not. Foster described the fictional setting as a "place that used to have a foundation and a glory", which reflects how Marie views herself. She stated that the filming involved "very long hours" and that the scenes starring the younger children were particularly troublesome. Graphic content was mostly avoided in the episode, with Foster believing it would "distract from what the meaning was". An exception was the scene where Sara attacks her mother. Brooker noted that in this scene, more hits were filmed than made it into the episode, though enough were needed in the final cut for the viewer to understand Sara's perspective, and for Marie to be plausibly rendered unconscious. The final shot of the episode, where Marie frantically tries to use the tablet shouting "No!" repeatedly, was filmed the day after the presidential election results were known and Donald Trump became president-elect; DeWitt injected her personal reaction at the results into the scene.

Foster described the ending as a "parable". DeWitt's first day on set was to film the scene where a bloodied Marie runs out of the house screaming for her daughter. The episode ends with Sara entering a truck, which was originally a small car in the script. The choice of a truck implies that Sara will be travelling far, and Harding felt "a mixture of nervous trepidation and excitement for Sara". Foster said: "I want her to close that door on this chapter, this town, on that relationship, and become who she is." Foster flew to London to help Brooker with the episode's editing—the first time she had met him. The song "I'm a Mother" by the Pretenders plays during the credits, chosen as a "plaintive song" which reminds viewers of "the mother's perspective", according to Foster.

== Marketing ==
External videos
- Black Mirror – Arkangel; Trailer for "Arkangel"
- Black Mirror – Featurette: Arkangel; Commentary by Charlie Brooker, Rosemarie DeWitt, Jodie Foster and Annabel Jones

In May 2017, a Reddit post unofficially announced the names and directors of the six episodes in series 4 of Black Mirror. The first trailer for the series was released by Netflix on 25 August 2017, and contained the six episode titles. In September 2017, two photos from the fourth season were released, including one from "Arkangel". Beginning on 24 November 2017, Netflix published a series of daily posters and trailers for the fourth series, referred to as the "13 Days of Black Mirror". The first poster and trailer were of "Arkangel". On 6 December, Netflix published a trailer featuring an amalgamation of scenes from the fourth series, which announced that the series would be released on 29 December.

== Analysis ==
As intended by Foster, critics saw the episode as being set in working-class America. The Atlantic's Sophie Gilbert found it "set in a nondescript EveryTown USA" and "deliberately muted". Steve O'Brien of Digital Spy saw it as more "thrillingly, authentically American" than any prior episode. Louisa Mellor of Den of Geek found that the blue-collar setting contrasts with most previous episodes' depictions of "shiny near-futures, in chic, modernist homes". She also highlighted the episode as the most female-heavy with regard to characters to that point. Paste's Jacob Oller commented that the camera shows multiple perspectives throughout the episode: first-person, third-person and first-person from another person's perspective. Oller saw this as giving the episode a horror feel, heightened by the "long-short-long editing" pattern of "tension, release, rebuild". Caroline Framke of Vox saw Foster's directing as "generally stark and matter-of-fact", though a handheld camera is used when characters are in "a particular state of panic" so that the framing shows "their confused and rapidly fracturing relationship to each other and the world around them". Christopher Hooton of The Independent compared the injured Marie yelling on the street to a similar performance by Anna Gunn as Skyler White in the crime drama Breaking Bad.

The episode has a theme of helicopter parenting. Entertainment Weekly's Darren Franich saw it as a "straightforward parable"; both Franich and Vulture's Charles Bramesco compared the episode to an after school special due to its simple moral message. In Variety, Sonia Saraiya wrote that it was "so blatant it could bludgeon you", the message being: "If you love it, let it go". Mellor found that relevant questions raised include where the "right to privacy and agency" of a child overrides the "power of a parent", and whether pain is an "instructive" or "traumatising" formative experience. Framke saw the episode as a case of the programme's "overall ethos that pretty much everything we try in the name of protecting ourselves and each other will eventually, inevitably backfire", in that Marie trying to shield Sara is only "a temporary salve". Bramesco compared the episode's storyline to that of Spring Awakening, a 1906 play later adapted into a 2000s musical: the play depicts teenagers developing sexual awareness after a lack of parental sex education. Gilbert commented on a similarity between the Arkangel's functionality and that of the Z-Eyes from the Black Mirror episode "White Christmas".

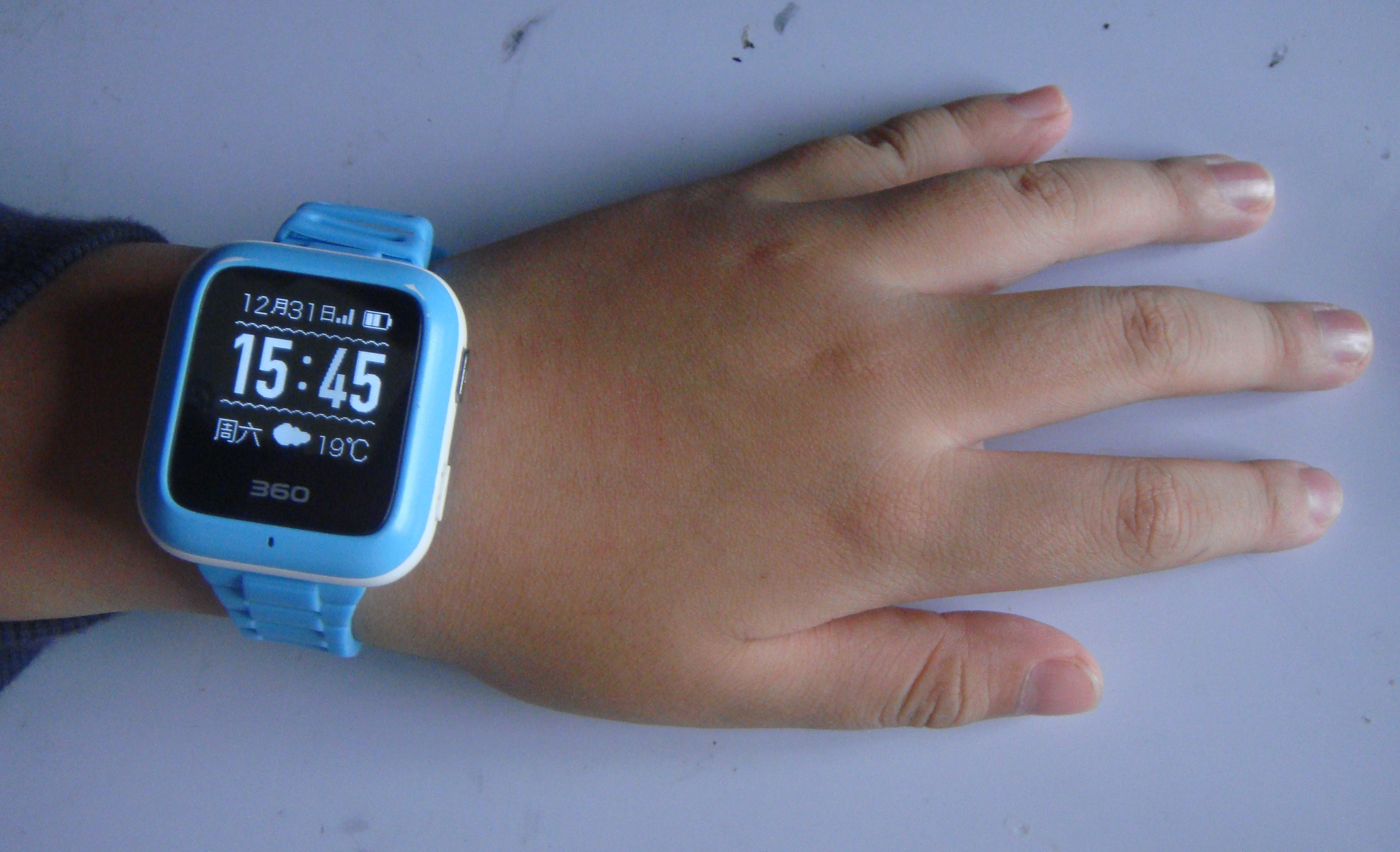
The Guardian's Zoe Williams compared Arkangel to existing smartwatches designed for children.

Critics identified various technologies in the real world as relevant to the episode's themes. Oller compared Arkangel to radio-frequency identification (RFID) implants used in animals, while Tasha Robinson of The Verge commented that such implants have been used in humans. Robinson further noted that there have been "a long-running series of debates" over the morality of using the implants in children. Zoe Williams commented in The Guardian that GPS monitoring for children is frequently marketed in the form of a smartwatch, some of which can listen into the wearer's conversations. She found the underlying principle behind the technology to be "that your perception of your child's vulnerability takes precedence over their interaction with the world". Robinson noted that clothing with trackers and third-party monitoring and control of a mobile phone are other technologies targeted at parents.

The opening scene in which Marie gives birth serves to show her anxieties as a parent. Gilbert said that she feels "frantic" and briefly thinks her baby has died, which is "every parent's worst fear". Mellor said that it shows Marie "feels anxiety and guilt over not being a good-enough mother" even before she begins parenting. Robinson analysed that the episode uses the scene "as a frame for how [Marie] projects her fears of inadequacy onto her daughter". O'Brien saw the doctor's line "cutting the umbilical cord" as reflecting symbolism that for Marie, "it never was cut". Mellor said that Marie's isolation as a single parent, ill father and long working hours are all contributing factors to her guilt. Similarly, O'Brien commented that Marie has little in her life outside of Sara and that few of her interactions with Sara "aren't finger-wagging". Bramesco saw Marie as "the one at fault" in the episode, with Trick portrayed as "a pretty decent guy" and Sara's drug usage not being seen as "scandalizing".

The reproductive healthcare organisation Planned Parenthood criticised the depiction of emergency contraceptive (EC) pills as inaccurate. A nurse tells Sara that the purpose of such a pill is "terminating your pregnancy", but this is a description of abortion rather than contraception. Contraception prevents the fertilisation of an egg before a person becomes pregnant.

== Reception ==
The episode received mixed reception. The review aggregator Rotten Tomatoes gives the episode a 78% rating based on 23 critics, with the summary: "Though a bit too on the nose, 'Arkangel' brings balance to Black Mirror's typically frenetic episodes with a calm, contemplative, and compelling installment." The Telegraph awarded it three out of five stars while Vulture gave it two. Paste rated it 8.6 out of 10 and The A.V. Club gave it a B+. Robinson found it the "weakest" episode of the fourth series.

Critics were split on the episode's storyline and message. Gilbert saw the premise as "potent" and Mellor as "solid", but Robinson saw the story as "simplistic". Bramesco saw it as "too far-fetched to accept" that the Arkangel technology could be developed and used despite "such glaring potential for calamity and/or human-rights violations". Saraiya found the story "well-done" and O'Brien found the ending "beautifully ambiguous". The A.V. Club's Zach Handlen viewed the narrative arc as unsurprising but said that "the specifics make it compelling"; he reviewed that the moral is "hard to argue with" but "not really unexpected". Gilbert found the moral "increasingly obvious" once Sara lies to her mother about where she is going out for the evening, whilst Robinson said that the episode's "sheer earnestness makes its simplicity and obviousness even more awkward". Handlen saw the conclusion as obvious in the context of past Black Mirror episodes, which "robs the episode of freshness or surprise".

Many reviewers had criticisms of the episode's execution or focus, with Gilbert finding that the execution is where it "sputters and dies". Robinson wrote that Brooker "starts a story with infinite potential, then cuts it short just as it’s spinning up". Gilbert found the topic of young children being exposed to sexual and violent material from a young age more timely than helicopter parenting. Ed Power, writing for The Telegraph, similarly found it a "pity Brooker doesn't delve further" into pornography's effects on Sara. Robinson also thought it would have been interesting to explore Marie "living through" Sara when she begins young adulthood. However, Bramesco praised that the episode is a "rare meditation on the millennial generation that rightly looks to the parents for answers instead of blaming the youth". Hooton saw the film Men, Women & Children (2014) as exploring similar themes to "Arkangel" but with stronger execution.

Foster's directing and casting was the subject of much commentary. Gilbert wrote that the "lo-fi, indie feel Foster gives the episode captures the terrible ordinariness of the situation", praising "unforgettable images" and "foreboding framing". Mellor found that Foster constructed a "sensitive and emotional US indie-movie style", while Handlen noted that she "captures the show's clinical, mournful feel, but manages a necessary level of intimacy that keeps the story from being overly schematic". In contrast, Hooton saw the episode as "visually flat" and Bramesco wrote that Foster engages in "misunderstanding the emotional timbre a scene should have".

Franich and Power praised the performances as "fine" and "compelling", respectively, with both praising Foster for her direction of the younger actors. However, Hooton saw the actors as "miscast". DeWitt's portrayal of Marie received praise for balancing positive and negative traits, by critics Oller, Handlen and Power. Mellor praised a "deft balance" in that Brooker and Foster "have taken pains not to demonise, but to create a likeable, easy-to-relate-to character" in Marie. Oller praised Marie's confrontation of Trick as "epic, expertly realized and emotionally grounded". Contrastingly, Bramesco criticised the climax as "abrupt and melodramatic", resulting in "incredulous snorts" rather than "gasps".

=== Episode rankings ===
"Arkangel" ranked poorly on critics' lists of the 23 instalments of Black Mirror, from best to worst:

- 11th – Aubrey Page, Collider
- 13th – Corey Atad, Esquire
- 16th – Matt Donnelly and Tim Molloy, TheWrap
- 16th – Ed Power, The Telegraph
- 18th – Morgan Jeffery, Digital Spy
- 20th – James Hibberd, Entertainment Weekly
- 21st – Travis Clark, Business Insider
- 22nd – Charles Bramesco, Vulture

IndieWire authors ranked the 22 Black Mirror instalments excluding Bandersnatch by quality, giving "Arkangel" a position of 20th. Eric Anthony Glover of Entertainment Tonight found the episode to be 12th-best of the 19 episodes from series one to four. Instead of by quality, Proma Khosla of Mashable ranked the episodes by tone, concluding that "Arkangel" is the 11th-most pessimistic episode of the show.

Other reviewers ranked "Arkangel" against other series four episodes:

- 3rd (grade: B+) – TVLine
- 6th – Christopher Hooton, Jacob Stolworthy, The Independent

=== Awards ===
For his work on "Arkangel", Malcolm McCulloch was nominated for a Location Managers Guild Awards in the category of Outstanding Locations in a Contemporary Television Series.
