= Puberty Blues (novel) =

Book by Gabrielle Carey and Kathy Lette

- First edition
- Author: Gabrielle Carey; Kathy Lette
- Language: English
- Genre: Novel
- Publisher: McPhee Gribble
- Publication date: 1979
- Publication place: Australia
- Media type: Print
- Pages: 144
- ISBN: 978-1-742759-28-9
- OCLC: 50270616
- Dewey Decimal: 791.4372

Puberty Blues (1979) is a novel by the Australian writers Gabrielle Carey and Kathy Lette. It is their first published book. It has long been controversial with adults but much sought out by teenagers for its depictions of adolescent sex. A film based on the novel was released in 1981. A television series based on the novel began airing in 2012.

== Plot summary ==
"novel about the real lives of teenage surfie chicks in Cronulla"

The novel is set in the Sutherland Shire, in southern Sydney, New South Wales, Australia in the 1970s. Deb and Sue are thirteen-year-old high school students whose lives are about male surfers, panel vans, straight-leg Levis, skipping school, getting wasted and fitting in. The girls strive to become "surfie chicks", the groupies that hang around the surfer-boy gangs of Sydney. Adhering to rules that prevent them from eating or going to the toilet in the surfers' presence, the girls manage to become members of a surfing gang from Sylvania and are assigned boyfriends but, to the boys, they are just sexual objects. After Deb suffers a surprise miscarriage and the introduction of heroin takes its toll on their social group, the girls finally become disillusioned with the sexism and narrow-mindedness of their crowd and leave the group.

== Themes ==
Puberty Blues addresses the sexism of surf culture and youth culture in general in Australia in the 1970s. It also deals with what would become common young adult themes such as love, sex and identity.

== Critical reception ==
The novel was the third to be published by McPhee Gribble and thus occupied a special place in the development of Australian literature. There were strong reactions to the depictions of underage sex, rape, pregnancy, drinking and drug-taking. Many were scandalised, while others defended it as a feminist work, with Germaine Greer calling it a "profoundly moral story". The book also drew attention from those whom it was based on. But Kylie Minogue spoke for many when she said, "I don't recall reading Puberty Blues so much as devouring it. I was about thirteen, alone in my bedroom with the door firmly shut. I was fascinated." It is now regarded as a classic.

The pressures of public attention caused Carey and Lette to go their separate ways.

== Adaptations ==
In 1982, the novel was adapted to the film Puberty Blues directed by Bruce Beresford from a screenplay by Margaret Kelly. The lead actors were Nell Schofield and Jad Capelja. The film has been criticised for removing or downplaying some of the more controversial content from the novel.

In 2012, the novel was adapted to the television series Puberty Blues, starring Ashleigh Cummings and Brenna Harding.
