= Puberty Blues (film) =

- Theatrical release poster
- Directed by: Bruce Beresford
- Screenplay by: Margaret Kelly
- Based on: Puberty Blues by Kathy Lette and Gabrielle Carey
- Produced by: Joan Long; Margaret Kelly
- Starring: Nell Schofield; Jad Capelja; Geoff Rhoe; Tony Hughes; Kirrily Nolan; Alan Cassell; Rowena Wallace; Charles Tingwell
- Cinematography: Don McAlpine
- Edited by: William M. Anderson
- Music by: Les Gock
- Production company: Limelight Productions
- Distributed by: Roadshow Films
- Release date: 10 December 1981 (Australia)
- Running time: 87 minutes
- Country: Australia
- Language: English
- Budget: AU $800,000
- Box office: AU$3.9 million (Australia)

Puberty Blues is a 1981 Australian coming-of-age comedy-drama film directed by Bruce Beresford, based on the 1979 novel of the same name by Kathy Lette and Gabrielle Carey. The film stars Nell Schofield and Jad Capelja as teenagers in the Sutherland Shire in Sydney. It was both a commercial and critical success in Australia. It was followed by a TV series adaptation of the same name in 2012.

== Plot ==
The story focuses on two teenage girls from the middle-class Sutherland Shire in Sydney. The girls attempt to create a popular social status by ingratiating themselves with the "Greenhill gang" of surfers, a group of boys with a careless attitude toward casual sex, drugs and alcohol, over the course of one Sydney summer.

== Cast ==
- Nell Schofield as Debbie Vickers
- Jad Capelja as Sue Knight
- Jeffrey Rhoe as Garry
- Tony Hughes as Danny
- Sandy Paul as Tracy
- Leander Brett as Cheryl
- Rowena Wallace as Mrs. Knight
- Charles 'Bud' Tingwell as The Headmaster
- Kate Sheil as Mrs Velland
- Alan Cassell as Mr Vickers

== Production ==
Television writer Margaret Kelly was working at a writing workshop at a suburban theatre where she met Kathy Lette and Gabrielle Carey, who had written a number of unpublished stories about growing up in the surfing beaches of southern Sydney. Kelly showed the stories to producer and writer Joan Long, and optioned the film rights. Carey and Lette went on to write a column in The Sun-Herald as The Salami Sisters and the stories were published under the title Puberty Blues.

Long first approached Gillian Armstrong to direct but she turned it down. Then Bruce Beresford read the book and wrote asking to direct:

I bought it [the novel] while I was waiting for a bus in North Sydney. I went to get a chocolate or something and I saw a pile of these things sitting on the counter. I thought I'd buy one and read it on the bus going home. It was remarkable, a very well-expressed book. And the girls were only fifteen. It was a sort of insight into the way of life of those kids, which was a revelation to me... Kathy Lette was a real livewire and so was the other girl, Gabrielle Carey.

The movie was made with the assistance of the Australian Film Commission, who provided $413,708. The lead roles were cast after an extensive selection process.

Nell Schofield, said that "It's a very honest and realistic movie. It touches on this and it touches on that. I really like it. It's subtle and doesn't preach: 'This is the way of life.'" Schofield felt that "Different sections of the audience will perceive different levels. The parents who go and see it will come out and either believe it or it will give them a bit of a jolt. They'll start looking at their kids a different way and try to bridge the generation gap." She added that "The film is feminist in a way. I think it is also a comment on peer group pressure, male chauvinism in teenage groups, school and parent hassles."

Schofield found the surfing scenes easy because she was an avid surfer in real life. "Like Debbie, I wanted to be a surfie chick. But once I was, I wanted out before it got too heavy. I hated the alcohol and the drug scene. I saw so many kids fall down on the ground after taking drugs." Of making the film Schofield said "We didn't expect any glitter, and we didn't get any. It was hard work."

=== Changes from book to film ===
For censorship reasons, in the film their age was increased to 16. Much of the content of the novel appears in the film, with several passages of text recounted by the film's protagonist, Debbie, in a voice-over narration. The film closely follows the story and character trajectory of the novel. Some of the novel's characters are composites in the film. The tone of the novel is generally darker than that of the film, and in the novel Debbie and Sue are shown to be much more willing participants in activities than they are in the film. The film adds a comedy beach brawl between the surfers and the lifeguards not present in the novel.

Lette complained that "the film sanitised the plot by omitting central references to miscarriage and abortion. The movie depicts a culture in which gang rape is incidental, mindless violence is amusing and hard drug use is fatal, but it was unable to address the consequences of the brutal sexual economy in which the girls must exist."

Much of the obscure surfer slang of the novel was omitted from the film. The novel features some discussion about television series Number 96. One passage of the novel that mentions the title is recounted by the film's protagonist in a voice-over narration, but because the series had ended by the time of the 1981 film the series title is replaced by the generic term "television".

== Soundtrack ==
The theme song "Puberty Blues" was written by Tim Finn. In the film it was sung by Sharon O'Neill. It was released by Jenny Morris as a single on Mushroom Records in December 1981.

"Nobody Takes Me Seriously" by New Zealand group, Split Enz is played over the final scene. The Split Enz song "I Hope I Never" is also featured in the film.

== Reception ==
=== Box office ===
The film also resonated with audiences, particularly teenagers, who found its depiction of surfing culture and adolescent rituals relatable. This connection contributed to its box office success, with “Puberty Blues” grossing approximately $A3,918,000 in Australia.

This commercial performance placed it among the top Australian films at the domestic box office during that period.

=== Critical reaction ===
The film received a positive reception upon its release. Critics praised its authentic portrayal of teenage life in Sydney’s surfing subculture. John Lapsley of The Sun-Herald described it as “a wonderfully judged film about the comedy and tragedy of growing up,” noting that few American films in the same genre matched its quality.

In an appraisal of the film, ACMI, Australia's national museum of screen culture praised the film for capturing "a unique slice of Australiana." and for its "honest and raw depiction of Australian adolescence."

In 2016, film critic Rochelle Siemienowicz wrote about the film for the Special Broadcasting Service: "the film captures the raw honesty and bold humour of the source material." Siemienowicz continued to describe the final scene, where Debbie surfs as "surely one of the finest feminist moments in Australian cinema and guaranteed to bring a surge of rebellious pride to any female heart." Rose Capp also wrote about the scene for Melbourne film journal, Senses of Cinema in 2011: "And the two short minutes Beresford takes to establish Debbie’s triumph on the surfboard equally carries a symbolic import that far exceeds its functional weight as narrative denouement."

Journalist, Helen Pitt wrote about the film for the Sydney Morning Herald when she was a teenager. She again wrote about it in 2021 for the newspaper, 40 years after its release. Pitt praised the film, asserting that it "serves as a valuable timepiece."

In 2021, Greta Parry of The Guardian wrote that the film "offered a sharp rebuttal to the idealised version of the Australian beach – that of an egalitarian paradise – that has long lived in our collective imagination."

Overall, “Puberty Blues” is regarded as a significant film in Australian cinema, capturing the nuances of teenage life and the surfing scene of its time.

== Home media ==
Puberty Blues was first released on home video in the early 1980s. It made its debut on DVD with a new print by Umbrella Entertainment in 2003. The DVD is compatible with all region codes and includes special features such as the trailer, interviews with Nell Schofield and Bruce Beresford, trivia and biographies.

In 2013, Umbrella Entertainment released the film on Blu-ray.

Umbrella Entertainment has also released a three-disc DVD set with Monkey Grip and Dimboola.

== See also ==
- Puberty Blues (TV series)
