= Ted Roberts =

Australian television screenwriter (1931–2015)

- Born: Edwin Dudley Roberts; 17 April 1931; Strathfield, New South Wales, Australia
- Died: 23 February 2015 (aged 83)
- Occupations: Television and film screenwriter, executive producer, composer
- Awards: 4 x AWGIE Awards; Henry Lawson Festival Award; Henry Lawson prize; Richard Lane Award

Edwin Dudley Roberts (17 April 1931 – 23 February 2015) was an Australian television screenwriter and supervising producer.

== Early life and education ==
Roberts was born to Lesley Roberts and Louise Kearney in Strathfield, New South Wales. After completing his education at Marist Brothers College in Randwick, Roberts worked in advertising and sales promotion before commencing his career as a freelance writer for television and film.

== Television screenwriter ==
Ted Roberts began his career in television in the 1960s, writing early episodes of Skippy the Bush Kangaroo. The series was screened in over eighty countries and its theme tune, composed by Eric Jupp, is one of the best known and most recognisable Australian tunes. The long version (the B side on the 45 rpm record) has lyrics written by Roberts.

Ted Roberts' other television credits include major Australian television series: Homicide (Seven Network, 1964–1976), Certain Women (ABC, 1973–1976), Rush (ABC 1974–1976), Patrol Boat (ABC 1979–1980), Just Us (telemovie, 1986, Seven Network), Water Rats (Nine Network, 1996–2001), A Country Practice, Blue Heelers, Mission Impossible and Star Trek.

== Film screenwriting ==
Roberts' film credits include Bush Christmas, which starred Nicole Kidman in her first film, playing "one of three children searching for a stolen racehorse... The 1983 film, directed by Henri Safran, gives us a skinny, pink-cheeked, abundantly plainted Nicole, many moments of good humour, some fine location shots filmed in Queensland's Lamington Plateau, and music from band the Bushwackers."

== Awards ==
He won four Australian Awgies and a Henry Lawson Festival Award for his writing, and received AFI and Logie nominations.

He won the 1974 Australian Writers' Guild in the Original Television Drama Category for Three Men of the City.

He was also winner of the Henry Lawson Prize (for the TV miniseries Lindsay's Boy (ABC, 1974).

In 2003 he was awarded the prestigious Richard Lane Award by the Australian Writers' Guild for Services to the Australian Writers' Guild.

== Death ==
His death on 23 February 2015 was announced two days later in a press release by the Australian Writers Guild.

== Songs ==
One of his first songs (1965) was "Bound for Hobart Town" with music by S.E. Libaek. Recorded by Leonard Teale and Andy Sundstrom on CBS records. The song celebrates the annual Sydney to Hobart yacht race for the Cruising Yacht Club of Australia.

A later commission was for the Decimal Currency Board. An advertising jingle for the introduction of decimal currency on 14 February 1966, the tune is to "Click Go the Shears".

In come the dollars and in come the cents
To replace the pounds and the shillings and the pence
Be prepared for change when the coins begin to mix
On the fourteenth of February 1966.

Chorus:

Clink go the coins, clink, clink, clink
Change over day is closer than you think
Learn the value of the coins and the way that they appear
And things will be much smoother when the decimal point is here.

In 1968, he composed My Pal Skippy to music by Eric Jupp.

== Select credits ==
- The Amorous Dentist (1983)
