= Nell Schofield =

Australian actress

- Occupation: Actress
- Years active: 1981–present
- Notable work: Puberty Blues; The Last Resort
- Parent: Leo Schofield (father)

Nell Schofield is an Australian actress and playwright. She had starred in the film Puberty Blues and the TV series The Last Resort She played a supporting role in the series 1915.

Schofield studied acting and script writing at NIDA and saw her play Cowgirls and Indians staged as part of 2 for the Road at the Parade Theatre in 1988.

On stage she appeared in No(h) Exit (The Sydney Theatre Company, 1987), Globos Shock (Kinselas, 1986), The Greeks (NIDA third year students, Parade Theatre, 1985) and American Days (Bondi Pavillon, 1982). For the latter she, along with Baz Luhrmann, Gabrielle Mason, and Julia Little (all who had been recently rejected by NIDA) formed the Bond Theatre Company to stage the production.
