= Beastmaster (TV series) =

Television series, 1999–2002

- Genre: Action/Adventure; Supernatural; Fantasy
- Inspired by: The Beast Master by Andre Norton (1959)
- Developed by: Sylvio Tabet
- Starring: Daniel Goddard; Jackson Raine; Marjean Holden; Monika Schnarre; Dylan Bierk; Grahame Bond; Steven Grives
- Theme music composer: Graeme Coleman
- Countries of origin: Australia; Canada; United States
- No. of seasons: 3
- No. of episodes: 66 (list of episodes)

Production
- Executive producers: Sylvio Tabet; Greg Coote; Allan Eastman; Steve Feke; Jeffrey M. Hayes
- Running time: 45 mins
- Production companies: Coote/Hayes Productions; Alliance Atlantis Communications; Tribune Entertainment

Original release
- Network: Syndicated; CTV
- Release: 9 October 1999 – 13 May 2002

Related
- The Beastmaster: Beastmaster 2: Through the Portal of Time; Beastmaster III: The Eye of Braxus

Beastmaster is a sword and sorcery television series inspired by the 1959 science fiction novel The Beast Master by American author Alice "Andre" Norton. The series re-imagines the adventures of the Beastmaster based upon the main protagonist character Dar from the 1982 MGM theatrical film, The Beastmaster, albeit with alternate allies and villains. The series aired 66 episodes over three complete seasons from 1999 to 2002. It was produced by Coote/Hayes Productions.

The series was nominated an Open Craft Television Award in the category of cinematography by the Australian Film Institute in 2000, and for a Saturn Award for Best Syndicated/Cable Television Series by the Academy of Science Fiction, Fantasy, and Horror Films in 2001.

== Premise ==
"In an age when nature and magic rule the world, there is an extraordinary legend: the story of a warrior who communicates with animals, who fights sorcery and the unnatural. His name is Dar, last of his tribe. He's also called... Beastmaster!"

— Opening narration

Dar, as one of only two survivors of the Sula tribe, wanders the world using his unique gift of communication with animals to protect people and animals oppressed by the Terrons, who massacred his own people.

Dar's animal companions include a black eagle named Sharak, (Note: In the first film, The Beastmaster, Dar never names his golden eagle. It's neither listed in motion picture credits, nor mentioned in dialog, nor printed on DVD packaging. However "Sharak" is listed in screen end-credits of the sequel film, Beastmaster 2: Through the Portal of Time as voiced by Frank Welker. In the television series, actor Daniel Fitzgerald is credited as Sharak when the eagle reverts to his human form.) who is older than the rocks from the Great Age of Ice, a million years ago. "A sorcerer took away his ability to die. He's gained a lot of wisdom over time." His pair of ferrets are named Kodo (the female who "stays home") and Podo (the male who "is always eating"); "they were a part of a tribe of their own race, but got thrown out for being mischievous thieves, troublemakers." Dar's Bengal tiger friend Ruh, which means "headstrong and powerful", understands who is innocent and who is guilty and helps protect Dar's companions.

Kyra, Dar, The Sorceress, & Tao

From those who Dar has helped, his gift has earned him the title "Beastmaster" and his growing fame has spread, drawing attention from the Sorceress, who would use him for her own ends to ingratiate herself to powerful leaders such as the Terron King, Zad. Dar seeks out his fellow Sula tribeswoman and lost loved Kyra. Along the way, he rescues the scholarly medicine man, Tao, whose name means "The Way." Despite Tao's fearful nature, Tao is drawn to Dar and agrees to help in his quest. The orphaned warrior Arina also joins. Despite having her own initial agenda, she eventually develops a faithful friendship.

Meanwhile, the world is changing. Civilization is advancing, technology is gaining ground slowly, the old orders of magic and sorcery are fading, and the world is threatened by the supernatural being Balcifer, the Dark One. Dar is revealed to be the son of King Eldar, who was destroyed by Balcifer. To defeat, Balcifer Dar must locate and reunite his family, who have been turned into animals to hide them from Balcifer, in "The Crystal Ark."

Balcifer's agent on Earth is King Zad, who is the first King of the Terrons, a savage tribe that enslaves and pillages at will. Later, when the tribe is destroyed by King Voden leading a group of Viking-like northerners, Zad re-emerges as the King of Xincha, the city at the center of the world, and Tao's former home. Zad has deposed Voden, who fled into the wilderness at the end of the second season. There is a contrast between the crude savage cruelty of King Zad and the refined, insane evil genius of King Voden. Zad emerges from the contest more civilized, albeit still, a cruel character.

The series is action-oriented in the beginning, but as the first season progresses, pacifistic and naturalist tones emerge.

== Episodes ==
Season	Episodes	Originally released	
Season	Episodes	First released	Last released
1	22	October 9, 1999	May 20, 2000
2	22	October 7, 2000	May 19, 2001
3	22	October 1, 2001	May 13, 2002

== Cast and characters ==
In addition to the main protagonists, the series features Monika Schnarre as the Sorceress, apprentice to the Ancient One, played by Grahame Bond, Emilie de Ravin as the Forest Demon named Curupira, and Sam Healy as Iara, the Demon of Water and Serpent (Curupira and Iara are inspired by the creatures of the same name from Brazilian mythology). The regular human enemy of Dar, King Zad, is played by Steven Grives. Marc Singer, the Beastmaster from the original film, appears in the third season as Dartanus, the Spirit Warrior who helps Dar on his quest.

=== Main ===
- Daniel Goddard as Dar
- Jackson Raine as Tao
- Monika Schnarre as the Sorceress – (seasons 1–3) (Note: Monika Schnarre's character, The Sorceress, is magically imprisoned by the Ancient One in the season two episode "Rage" and is seen again in the following episode "White Tiger" in which she tells Curupira, "The Ancient One had a snit and replaced me... Tall, blonde. He likes tall blondes." Asked why, she explains, "It was a matter of the heart...and a sorceress is not supposed to have one. And she's not supposed to fall in love." Dylan Bierk is credited as The Sorceress beginning two episodes later in "Gone" and appears for the remainder of season two. Schnarre returns to the role in season three.)
- Natalie Jackson Mendoza as Kyra – (season 1)
- Marjean Holden as Arina – (seasons 2–3)
- Dylan Bierk as the Sorceress – (season 2)
- Grahame Bond as the Ancient One – (seasons 1–2)
- Steven Grives as King Zad
- Emilie de Ravin as the demon Curupira – (seasons 1–2)
- David Paterson as King Voden – (season 2)

=== Recurring ===
- Simon Westaway as Baha
- Daniel Fitzgerald as Sharak
- Leah Purcell as the Black Apparition (Note: The first appearance of the Black Apparition character is a non-speaking role credited to Alex Coleman, whereas remaining appearances are portrayed by Leah Purcell. Later episodes either omit Purcell's role name in opening screen credits, or list her in end credits variably as "The Apparition" or "Black Apparition.")
- Tasma Walton as Caro
- Samantha Healy as the demon Iara
- Mark Lee as Hjalmar
- Jeremy Callaghan as Balcifer, the Dark One
- Ivar Kants as Slythius
- Dominic Purcell as Kelb
- Marc Singer as Dartanus
- Sue Mulcahy as Queen / Dar's Mother (Note: Dar has two mothers in the television series. Neither role has a given name or surname in screen credits or dialog. In season one, Dar's adoptive Sula mother is portrayed by Danielle Carter, who only appears in "Valhalla" in which opening screen credit omits her role name. In season three, Dar's birth mother is the Queen, wife of his real father King Eldar. She is portrayed by Sue Mulcahy, and listed in end credits variably as "Queen" in "The Legend Reborn" or "Dar's Mother" in "End Game" and "A New Dawn.")

=== Notable guest stars ===
- John Adam as Rolan
- Steve Bastoni as Maloc (2 episodes)
- Steve Bacic as Kim
- Michala Banas as Loriel
- Jon Bennett as Terron Leader
- Bianca Biasi as Elka
- Claudia Black as Huna
- Holly Brisley as Haisa / Kodo-Woman
- Brandon Burke as Castrone
- Brittany Byrnes as Muraki
- Tim Campbell as Galen
- Danielle Carter as Dar's adoptive Sula mother
- Anja Coleby as Queen Nyoka
- Keith Hamilton Cobb as Akili / Akili's Father
- Rodger Corser as Sararmago
- Lara Cox as Marika
- Louise Crawford as Lycia (2 episodes)
- Marton Csokas as Qord (3 episodes)
- Alexandra Davies as Zuraya (2 episodes)
- Jodie Dry as Radia
- Nicholas Eadie as Arkon
- Gigi Edgley as Maleena / Talia
- Jerome Ehlers as Dagan
- Isla Fisher as the demon Manaka
- Damien Garvey as Niqit / Terron 2 / Terron Guard
- Sara Groen as Alau
- David Gulpilil as Shaman
- Brooke Harman as Princess Jessica
- George Henare as Nutoa
- Raelee Hill as Sella
- Nicholas Hope as Khadro, Arkon's high priest
- Harold Hopkins as Kumon
- Inge Hornstra as Nadeea
- Ryan Johnson as Reon
- Annie Jones as The Guardian
- Grace Jones as Nokinja, an Umpatra warrior
- Ivar Kants as Ramah
- Angela Keep as Melora
- Gerard Kennedy as Nessis
- Simone Kessell as Hyppolyte
- Christopher Kirby as Orpheo (2 episodes)
- Dawn Klingburg as Crone Olana
- Paul Leyden as Chiron
- Todd MacDonald as Breon
- Andrea McEwan as Pola
- Scott McRae as Frolo
- Robert Mammone as Arnath
- Angie Milliken as High Priestess
- Kestie Morassi as Erial
- Rod Mullinar as Chiuma
- Callan Mulvey as Rikko
- Rene Naufahu as Mataffa
- Nique Needles as Bone Collector
- Ada Nicodemou as The Nymph
- Genevieve O'Reilly as Nagha
- Helen Reddy as The Seer
- Tim Robertson as Solon
- Steven Rooke as Podo-Man
- Chris Sadrinna as Jem / Paj
- Brooke Satchwell as Rhana (2 episodes)
- Kristian Schmid as Karpen
- Peta Sergant as the demon Yamira
- John Seru as Muscle Protector #2 / Sentinel #2
- Anthony Simcoe as Milos
- Bruce Spence as Annubis
- Danielle Spencer as Destine
- Jacinta Stapleton as Ilira
- James Stewart as Han
- Nic Testoni as Nord Foreman
- Melissa Tkautz as Woman in Pool
- Leeanna Walsman as Morah
- Sandy Winton as Navas
- Roxane Wilson as Queen Atlantia
- Kristy Wright as Bianna
- Petra Yared as Alima

== Releases ==
=== Syndication ===
The series was shown on the UK FTA satellite channel Zone Horror (Sky EPG No. 321).

In the United States, syndication rights are held by Lionsgate Television.

=== Home ===
ADV Films released all three seasons of Beastmaster on DVD in Region 1 (USA and Canada) as separate DVD sets for each season. Season 3 was released on 18 November 2003. Each set has six DVDs with 22 episodes per season and extras. The three seasons were also released as Beastmaster – The Complete Collection (5 August 2008). Licensing problems between ADV Films and Tribune Entertainment (owner of Beastmaster) caused these DVD sets to become rare soon after release.

Alliance Home Entertainment has released all three seasons of Beastmaster on DVD in Canada.

Season	Episodes	Release dates
Season 1	22	13 July 2010
Season 2	22	24 August 2010
Season 3	22	21 September 2010

=== Streaming ===
The series has since been made available on streaming platforms such as Amazon Prime Video and Tubi.

== Awards and nominations ==
Beastmaster awards and nominations
Year	Award	Category	Nominee(s)	Result	Ref.
2000	Open Craft Television Award	Cinematography	Mark Wareham (Episode: "The Last Unicorn")	Nominated	
2001	Saturn Award	Best Syndicated/Cable Television Series	The Beastmaster (Alliance Atlantis)	Nominated	
