= Anja Coleby =

Australian actress and television journalist

- Born: Anja Taylor; 30 September 1971 (age 54); Sydney, New South Wales, Australia
- Occupations: Model, television actress, television producer, reporter
- Notable credit: Catalyst
- Television: ABC Television
- Parent(s): Robert Coleby; Lena Coleby
- Relatives: Conrad Coleby (brother)

Anja Coleby (born Anja Taylor, 30 September 1971) is an Australian model, television actress, reporter and producer.

== Early life and education ==
Anja Coleby was born and raised in Sydney. She graduated with a journalism degree at Charles Sturt University in New South Wales before starting an acting career for about a decade. She later graduated with a science degree at Macquarie University in Sydney and then worked as a researcher for National Geographic Society and Becker Entertainment.

== Acting career ==
Anja Coleby has appeared in a number of science fiction and action series, and in Australian film and television. She was a main cast member of the television series Flipper, playing the character Holly Myers for three seasons. She played a small role as Crystal in the Australian soap opera Breakers. She also appeared as a guest role in Australian television series including the crime drama Water Rats in 1997, and the medical drama All Saints in 2002. She also appeared in one episode of each science fiction and adventure series The Lost World (2000) as Hippolita, Farscape (2002) as Ponara, and BeastMaster (2001) as Queen Lyoka. Anja had supporting roles in the television film Max Knight: Ultra Spy (2000), her only role as a villain, and in the Australian films The Year My Voice Broke (1987), Dating the Enemy (1996) and The Finder (2001).

== Television career ==
Anja changed her surname from Coleby to Taylor in 2005 when she began reading the news for Arena TV. She has continued to work in Australian television, and has been a television producer and reporter for the ABC science program Catalyst, in which she has been a member of the team since 2006. Since then, Anja has presented and narrated alone a number of small documentaries about different fields such as medicine, nature, technology and education. In addition to being a reporter, Anja has also been a producer and researcher of these episodes among many others.

Anja started working in early 2013 with fellow reporters Simon Pampena and Derek Muller, presenting many other documentaries and doing an entire trip from Western Australia to Victoria. They started in Perth with a ride in an electric car, and then went to the gold mine of Kalgoorlie. They moved to Lake Lefroy to discover the giant salt lakes and then to South Australia to discover Weebubbie Cave, the deepest cave in the Nullarbor. They discovered the Eucla sand hills, the different species of the desert in Nullarbor, the beach of Yalata and its mulloway, and went to Coonawarra wine region to discover its wine. They followed their trip in Victoria to first discover a place in Warrnambool with penguin patrols who have been threatened by predators like foxes. They then visited a national park invaded of koalas, discovered coastal waters of the state of Victoria by mapping underwater, and finally ended in Melbourne flying in a hot air balloon. After her long Australian roadtrip, Anja has narrated again other documentaries alone.

== Modelling ==
Anja has also briefly modeled for Australian sport magazine Inside Sport, in which she appeared in a number of swimming suits.

== Personal life ==
Anja is the daughter of actor Robert Coleby and sister of actor Conrad Coleby. Her father is English and her mother is Swedish.

== Filmography ==
Year	Title	Role	Notes
1979	Patrol boat	Tracey	Episode: "Rogue Mine"
1987	The Year My Voice Broke	Gail Olson	
1995	Space: Above and Beyond	Bartley	Pilot episode
1996	Dating the Enemy	Karen Zader	
1996	Water Rats	Woman jogger	Episode: "Dead in the Water" (pilot)
1997	Water Rats	Linda "Coco" Jones	Episode: "Stolen Time"
1997	Heartbreak High	Luda	Season 6, Episode: 17
1996–2000	Flipper	Holly Myers	6 episodes
1998	Breakers	Crystal	
2000	Max Knight: Ultra Spy	Tyler	Television film
2000	The Lost World	Hippolita	Episode: "Amazons"
2001	BeastMaster	Queen Nyoka	Episode: "Game of Death"
2001	The Finder	Rebecca Castaldi	Television film
2002	All Saints	Anna Johnson	Episode: "No Respite"
2002	Farscape	Ponara	Episode: "Promises"
