= Bianca Biasi =

Australian actress

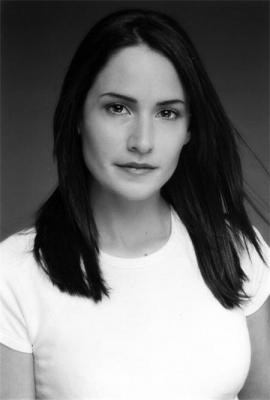
- Bianca Biasi
- Born: 13 May 1979 (age 47); Sydney, New South Wales, Australia
- Website: www.morningstarrprod.com

Bianca Biasi (born 13 May 1979) is an Australian producer, director, actress and author who has more recently specialised in projects involving supernatural or reportedly haunted locations, mostly on Sydney's northern beaches.

== Career ==
Actor

Biasi appeared in soap opera Home and Away as Constable Pia Correlli.

In 2006, she made her feature film debut in Burke & Wills (Cake Productions) in the role of Asha.

Producer

As of 1 January 2014, Biasi's studio had four films in post-production: The Quarantine Hauntings, The Parkway Hauntings, Delirium and The Q Station Experiment.

The location on Wakehurst Parkway was the subject of "countless anonymous stories online that speak of a girl in a white dress that appears on the Middle Creek Bridge as unsuspecting drivers go through her, or a nun apparition that sits in the back seat of cars," The Daily Telegraph reported. It also reported that both films, The Parkway Hauntings and The Quarantine Hauntings would be released in 2015.

== Personal life and activism ==
Bianca is also an outspoken advocate of LGBT rights in Australia and has appeared with her partner in media coverage across various outlets as a same sex mothers of twin girls, to raise awareness of the increased risk of violence against same sex parents in the lead up to divisive debate that preceded the 2017 Same-sex marriage plebiscite and subsequent legislation allowing same sex marriage.

== Filmography ==
Bianca Biasi film and television acting credits
Year	Title	Role	Notes	Ref.
Unknown	Breakers	Melanie	Episode #1.163	
Unknown	CNNNN: Chaser Non-stop News Network	Fungry's Customer		
2000	Above the Law	Sheena Clancy	1 episode	
2002	BeastMaster	Elka	Episode: "Turned to Stone" (S3.E13)	
2002	All Saints	Elly Chapman	1 episode	
2002	The Junction Boys	Nurse	Television film	
2003	White Collar Blue	Francesca Decia	1 episode	
2003	Life Support	Unknown	1 episode	
2003	Home and Away	Constable Pia Correlli	12 episodes	
2004	Soul Traces: The Introduction	Jasmine Dahlia	Television film	
2006	Burke & Wills	Asha	Theatrical film	
2006	Touched By Fellini	Waitress	Short film	
2015	The Quarantine Hauntings	Marina Santini	Theatrical film	
