= Jackson Raine =

Australian actor

- Born: 24 February 1974 (age 52); Sydney, New South Wales, Australia
- Occupation: Actor
- Years active: 1997–present

Jackson Raine (born 24 February 1974) is an Australian actor. He is best known for playing Tao in the action/fantasy series Beastmaster.

== Career ==
Raine's career began 1998 with his role in Australian TV drama All Saints. He is better known for playing Tao in the TV show Beastmaster, where he starred alongside Daniel Goddard, for the series' three seasons. He appeared in the American film The Great Raid.

== Filmography ==
Year	Title	Role	Notes
1998	All Saints	Dr. James Woo	Season 1, episodes 3 & 8
1999–2001	Beastmaster	Tao	Season 1–3 (main role, 65 episodes)
2000	Search Party	Himself – Contestant	Season 1, episode 75
2001	The Diamond of Jeru	Raj	TV movie
2003	Stingers	Barry Wilson	Season 7, episode 33
2005	The Great Raid	Truck Driver	Feature film
2008	Control	Jimmy	Short film
2009	Sea Patrol	Ana	Season 3, episode 2
2010	Neighbours	Marlon Diamond	Season 26, episode 187 (#5982)
2010	Backyard Bitz	Jack	Short film
2011	Jordana's Choice	Kif	Short film; also director & writer
2012	Soul Trader	Mr. Brunetti	Short film
2014	Last Tune	—N/a	Short film; choreographer
2015	Maximum Choppage	Henchman 1	Season 1, episodes 1, 3 & 6
2019	Harrow	Stuart Leong	Season 2, episodes 2 & 3
2025	The CEO	Mark	Short film
