= The Beastmaster =

1982 fantasy film directed by Don Coscarelli

- Theatrical release poster
- Directed by: Don Coscarelli
- Written by: Don Coscarelli; Paul Pepperman
- Based on: The Beast Master by Alice "Andre" Norton (uncredited, see § Production)
- Produced by: Paul Pepperman; Donald P. Borchers; Sylvio Tabet
- Starring: Marc Singer; Tanya Roberts; Rip Torn; John Amos
- Cinematography: John Alcott
- Edited by: Roy Watts
- Music by: Lee Holdridge
- Production companies: Beastmaster N.V.; ECTA Filmproduktion, GmbH & Co., K.G
- Distributed by: MGM/UA Entertainment Co.
- Release date: August 20, 1982
- Running time: 118 minutes
- Countries: United States; West Germany
- Language: English
- Budget: $9 million
- Box office: $14.1 million

The Beastmaster is a 1982 sword and sorcery film directed by Don Coscarelli and starring Marc Singer, Tanya Roberts, John Amos and Rip Torn. Very loosely based on the 1959 science fiction novel The Beast Master by Alice "Andre" Norton, the film is about a man who can communicate with animals, who fights an evil wizard and his army.

Commercially, The Beastmaster was not considered a box office success during its original cinematic run, but later received extensive television exposure and success on cable in the American market on channels TBS, TNT, and HBO.

The original film spawned two sequels; the 1991 theatrical film Beastmaster 2: Through the Portal of Time, and the 1996 television film Beastmaster III: The Eye of Braxus. In 1999, the syndicated Beastmaster television series "inspired by the book" re-imagined the adventures of Dar with alternate allies and villains.

== Plot ==
Maax [/ˈmeɪ.æks/ MAY-aks], the high priest of a cult in the city of Aruk, is warned by witches of a prophecy, which foretells his death at the hand of King Zed’s unborn son. Maax sends a witch to magically abduct the child from his mother. The witch brands the child and prepares to sacrifice him, but a passing traveler rescues him. The traveler names the child Dar and takes him to the nearby village of Emur to raise as an adoptive son. While growing up, Dar develops an unusual ability to telepathically communicate with animals, which his father warns him to keep secret.

Emur is destroyed by the Juns, a horde of savage barbarians, leaving an adult Dar as the only survivor. Dar sets out for Aruk with his father’s weapons to seek revenge against the Juns. Along the way, several animal companions join him: the golden eagle, Sharak; the ferrets, Kodo and Podo; and the black panther, Ruh. Dar also meets Kiri, a young woman who is a slave to the cult of Ar. One night, Dar encounters a race of sinister bird-like people. The bird-folk surround Dar, but upon realizing that he travels with Sharak, they give him a medallion and allow him to pass.

Dar reaches Aruk to find Maax and his cultists in control of the city. Dar rescues a young girl from imminent sacrifice and returns her to her father, Sacco. From Sacco, Dar learns that Maax, who is allied with the Juns, has imprisoned King Zed in the temple, and he is sacrificing their children to his god Ar. Realizing that Kiri is among those to be sacrificed, Dar leaves Aruk to find and save her. He is joined by the warrior Seth, and Zed’s younger son, Tal. The three rescue Kiri, who reveals she is Zed’s niece and recruits Dar to help rescue the king. While Seth leaves to gather rebel forces, Dar helps Kiri and Tal enter the temple and free Zed. The group flees Aruk with the help of Sacco.

At the rebel camp, Zed devises a plan to attack Aruk and defeat Maax. Dar warns Zed that the small rebel force cannot defend the city against the Juns. Zed senses Dar’s gift with animals and angrily denounces him as a freak and coward; Dar leaves the rebel camp. Seth learns that Maax has been magically spying on the group and warns Zed the plan is compromised. Zed, lusted for revenge, disregards Seth’s warning. The next morning, Dar learns the attack failed, and Zed and the others were captured and are to be sacrificed. Dar rushes to Aruk and fights his way to the top of the temple, where Maax reveals Dar’s parentage before murdering Zed. Dar defeats Maax, however Maax is healed by a witch’s magic. Kodo leaps onto Maax and causes him to fall into the sacrificial flames, killing them both.

The Juns ride to Aruk and attack at nightfall. Dar gives Sharak the medallion of the bird-folk, who flies away with it. Aruk's defenders manage to trap many Jun warriors in a flaming moat of tar, however the Junds eventually surround the defenders. The Jun chieftain, recognizing Dar from Emur, challenges him to single combat; Dar defeats him. As the remaining Junds close in, the bird-folk appear and devour the remaining Junds.

The next day, as Dar prepares to leave Aruk, Seth recognizes his branding and realizes Dar is the firstborn of Zed, and therefore the rightful king of Aruk. Dar declines the kingship, insisting that Tal will make a good king. Dar continues his travels alongside Kiri, Sharak, Ruh, and Podo, as well as two baby ferrets.

== Cast ==
- Marc Singer as Dar
  - Billy Jacoby as Young Dar
- Tanya Roberts as Kiri
- Rip Torn as Maax
- John Amos as Seth
- Josh Milrad as Tal
- Rod Loomis as King Zed
- Ben Hammer as Dar's Father
- Ralph Strait as Sacco
- Tony Epper as Jun Leader
- Vanna Bonta as Zed's Wife
- Paul Reynolds as Tils

== Production ==
Beastmaster began with a screenplay in the early 1980s written by Paul Pepperman and Don Coscarelli. The two writers based their film on Andre Norton's 1959 novel The Beast Master. The writers changed the story dramatically as the original novel had the hero named Hosteen Storm who was a veteran soldier of Navajo descent in a futuristic science fiction setting. Norton was unhappy with the liberties taken with the film's script and asked for her name to be removed from the credits. When Coscarelli signed on as a director, Pepperman became the film's producer and brought in co-producer Sylvio Tabet to the project. The producers went to raise funds for the film at the 1981 MIFED (Mercato internazionale del film e del documentario) film market in Milan and at the 1982 Cannes Film Festival. The budget of $9 million was raised, giving director Coscarelli his highest budget to work with up until that point in his career.

Coscarelli was frustrated while making the film, during which he feuded with the film's executive producer predominantly over the film's editing and casting. Coscarelli originally wanted Demi Moore for the role of Kiri, but the executive producer overrode his choice and had Tanya Roberts cast. The role of Maax was originally written for Klaus Kinski, but he was not cast over a salary dispute. The film was shot over the course of five-and-a-half months. The film was shot in California's Simi Valley and in Los Padres National Forest's Lake Piru in Ventura County, and Valley of Fire State Park in Nevada. Interior shots were done at MGM/UA lot.

The black "panther" was actually played by a tiger, which they dyed black since tigers are easier to handle for filming. During production, the tiger wasn't allowed to be on set at the same time as children or other animals, since it might harm them.

== Music ==
The score was composed and conducted by Lee Holdridge; it was recorded in Rome with members of The Orchestra of the Academy of Santa Cecilia of Rome and the Radio Symphony Orchestra of Rome. The soundtrack album was originally issued by Varèse Sarabande, and subsequently by C.A.M. In 2013 Quartet Records released a 1200-copy limited edition featuring the original album (tracks 1–13, disc 1) and most of the film's score (Holdridge wrote eighty minutes of music for the film; a few cues could not be found, but the album includes music that was not heard in the finished product).

=== Disc 1 ===
1. The Legend of Dar (Main Theme) (1:32)
2. The Horde (The Destruction of Emur) (2:43)
3. A Sword and an Eagle (The Epic Begins) (4:49)
4. Friends of Dar (Suite 1): A) The Princess Kiri B) Kodo, Podo and Reu (3:35)
5. The Pyramid (2:47)
6. Night Journey (Suite 2) A) The Eagle B) The City (3:56)
7. The Battle on the Pyramid (6:42)
8. A Hero's Theme (The Legend of Dar) (2:56)
9. Heroic Friends (4:30)
10. Escape From the Pyramid (2:40)
11. Dar's Solitude (1:28)
12. The Great Battle (Dar's Triumph) (3:37)
13. The New Kingdom (3:22)
14. The Beastmaster (Seq. 1 – Main Titles) (1:48)
15. The Beastmaster (Seq. 2 – Stealing the Child) (3:12)
16. The Beastmaster (Seq. 3 – The Ritual) (1:36)
17. The Beastmaster (Seq. 4 – A New Father) (1:35)
18. The Beastmaster (Seq. 5 – Jun Raid) (4:21)
19. The Beastmaster (Seq. 6 – Sword and Eagle) (4:41)
20. The Beastmaster (Seq. 7 – Ferret Chase/Quicksand) (2:13)
21. The Beastmaster (Seq. 8 – Captive Panther/Fighting Juns) (2:53)
22. The Beastmaster (Seq. 9 – The Bathing Scene) (1:20)
23. The Beastmaster (Seq. 10 – Dar Pursues Kiri) (5:10)

=== Disc 2 ===
1. The Beastmaster (Seq. 11 – Journey to the City) (1:31)
2. The Beastmaster (Seq. 12 – Sacrifice Thwarted) (4:16)
3. The Beastmaster (Seq. 13 – Death Sentence) (2:16)
4. The Beastmaster (Seq. 14 – Eagle Vision) (2:22)
5. The Beastmaster (Seq. 15 – The Rescue of Kiri) (2:21)
6. The Beastmaster (Seq. 16 – Raft Escape) (4:12)
7. The Beastmaster (Seq. 17 – Into the Pyramid/Corridor Ambush) (1:00)
8. The Beastmaster (Seq. 18 – Stealing the Keys/The Cell) (4:41)
9. The Beastmaster (Seq. 19 – The Escape Begins/The Escape Continues) (2:49)
10. The Beastmaster (Seq. 20 – A Little Late) (1:27)
11. The Beastmaster (Seq. 21 – Outside the Pyramid) (1:34)
12. The Beastmaster (Seq. 22 – Through the Gate/Dar the Outcast) (2:44)
13. The Beastmaster (Seq. 23 – Pyramid Battle, Part I (Alternate) (2:49)
14. The Beastmaster (Seq. 24 – Pyramid Battle, Part II (Alternate) (2:18)
15. The Beastmaster (Seq. 25 – Pyramid Battle, Part III (Alternate) (3:57)
16. The Beastmaster (Seq. 26 – Preparations) (1:48)
17. The Beastmaster (Seq. 27 – The Horde Attacks/The Moat/Dar vs. Jun Leader) (4:48)
18. The Beastmaster (Seq. 28 – The Tide Turns) (1:30)
19. The Beastmaster (Seq. 29 – A New King) (3:24)
20. The Beastmaster (Seq. 30 – Finale) (2:05)
21. The Battle on the Pyramid (Film version) (6:42)

== Release ==
The Beastmaster was originally planned to open December 25, 1982, but that July United Artists acquired domestic distribution rights and rescheduled the film for a summer release. It was rescheduled to August and had a promotional sneak peek of the film at the Comic Book and Science Fiction Convention in Los Angeles. The Beastmaster premièred in theatres on August 19, 1982. It was released in 16 cities in the United States on 165 screens and opened in eight more cities and 66 screens in its second week. The film opened in fifth place on its opening week. After six weeks, it had a total box office revenue of $3,561,475.

It subsequently received significant local TV and cable airplay, notably on HBO, TBS, and TNT. The film was shown so often on HBO that comedian Dennis Miller joked that HBO stood for "Hey, Beastmaster's On". It was also shown so often on TBS that it popularly gained a similar joke that TBS stood for "The Beastmaster Station". In 1993, a programming director for TNT claimed that it was second only to Gone with the Wind as the most popular movie to air on the network and attributed its success to its "mythological appeal—it's more serious than the Conan movies", while a programming director for Cinemax stated that "you can come into any part of it and not feel you've missed much".

The filmmakers arranged for star Tanya Roberts to appear in Playboy to help promote the film, but that issue did not come out until after the film had already been released.

== Reception ==
=== Box office ===
The Beastmaster grossed roughly $14 million on its initial theatrical release. Josh Milrad was nominated for a Young Artist Award for "Best Young Supporting Actor in a Motion Picture" for his co-starring role as Tal in the film.

=== Critical response ===
According to Variety, the film opened to mixed reviews. Gene Siskel of the Chicago Tribune gave it two stars out of four and wrote that it "isn't bad as much as it is overlong. After one of the film's major bad guys has been bumped off, the film inexplicably goes on for another 20 minutes. In this sort of brainless adventure film, one climax is enough". Vincent Canby of The New York Times thought the film was "neither better nor worse than 'Conan the Barbarian'" and "looks both big and cheap". Variety wrote: "When The Beastmaster begins, it is very hard to tell what it is all about. An hour later, it is very hard to care what it is all about. Another hour later, it is very hard to remember what it was all about". Kevin Thomas of the Los Angeles Times called it "a veritable comic book adventure come alive" that "succeeds on its own merits". Tom Milne of The Monthly Film Bulletin found the film "marginally livelier" than Conan the Barbarian but criticized the "very basic acting, the appalling post-synching, the sets which resort to disconcertingly ramshackle models, and direction of supreme stodginess which predictably uses helicopter shots to illustrate the eagle's spying missions (when all it sees as a rule is the hero prancing on the hilltops in self-conscious martial arts poses)".

The film holds a score of 50% on Rotten Tomatoes based on 14 reviews, with an average rating of 5.31 out of 10.

== Franchise ==
=== Sequels ===
The Beastmaster received a sequel in 1991, Beastmaster 2: Through the Portal of Time. The film was directed by the original film producer Sylvio Tabet. The made-for-television third film aired in 1996 on Universal Television's Action Pack and is titled Beastmaster III: The Eye of Braxus. Both sequels feature Marc Singer in the role of Dar.

=== Television series ===
The films were followed by a syndicated television series in 1999. The television series changes the backstory of Dar, who is played by Daniel Goddard.

== See also ==
- The Sword and the Sorcerer – a contemporaneous movie from the same genre
- Conan the Barbarian – a contemporaneous movie from the same genre
