= Max Knight: Ultra Spy =

- Genre: Action; Science fiction
- Written by: Paul Bales; David Michael Latt; David Rimawi; Sherri Strain
- Directed by: Colin Budds
- Starring: Michael Landes; Rachel Blakely; Brooke Harman; Christopher Morris
- Music by: Garry McDonald; Laurie Stone
- Country of origin: Australia; United States
- Original language: English

Production
- Producer: Darryl Sheen
- Editor: Geoff Lamb
- Running time: 86 minutes
- Production companies: Coote/Hayes Productions; Paramount Television

Original release
- Network: UPN
- Release: February 25, 2000

Max Knight: Ultra Spy is a 2000 American sci-fi action television film written by Paul Bales, David Michael Latt, David Rimawi, Sherri Strain, and directed by Colin Budds. The film stars Michael Landes, Rachel Blakely, Brooke Harman, and Christopher Morris. It features the use of video game related machinima as part of its production and storyline. Max Knight: Ultra Spy aired on UPN on February 25, 2000.

== Cast ==
- Michael Landes as Max Knight
- Rachel Blakely as Ricki / Claire
- Brooke Harman as Lindsay
- Christopher Morris as Zach
- Anja Coleby as Tyler

== Awards ==
The film was nominated for an Australian Screen Sound Guild Award for Best Achievement in Sound for a Tele-Feature.

== See also ==
- List of television films produced for UPN
