= Beastmaster III: The Eye of Braxus =

1996 film directed by Gabrielle Beaumont

- Promotional release poster
- Genre: Action; Adventure; Fantasy
- Based on: The Beast Master by Andre Norton and characters by Don Coscarelli and Paul Pepperman
- Written by: David Wise
- Directed by: Gabrielle Beaumont
- Starring: Marc Singer; Tony Todd; Keith Coulouris; Sandra Hess; Casper Van Dien; Patrick Kilpatrick; Lesley-Anne Down; David Warner
- Music by: Jan Hammer
- Country of origin: United States
- Original language: English

Production
- Executive producers: Stu Segall; Sylvio Tabet
- Producers: Lisa Cochran-Neilan; David Wise
- Cinematography: Michael J. Davis
- Editor: Ken Bornstein
- Running time: 92 minutes
- Production companies: Stu Segall Productions; MCA Television Limited

Original release
- Network: NBC
- Release: May 24, 1996

Beastmaster III: The Eye of Braxus is a 1996 American made-for-television sword and sorcery film and a sequel to the 1991 film Beastmaster 2: Through the Portal of Time, starring Marc Singer. The film received generally negative reviews from critics.

== Plot ==
"The legends speak of a new ruler, a young upstart named King Tal. They say he has a knowledge of The Eye, and they say he will share this knowledge with his brother, a nomad cursed to wander the deserts and the forests, a man with power over the animals, and scarred with the mark of the beast. I will command my warriors to bring the young king to me. That, in turn, will bring me his brother, The Beastmaster. When I have them both, I will regain my power and my kingdom. I must have The Eye of Braxus."

— Lord Agon, opening narration

The evil Lord Agon intones the mystical words and sacrifices a prisoner, magically regaining his own youth. Agon tells the aging warlock Maldor he needs more strength to open the tomb and that The Eye of Braxus will be found.

Meanwhile, Korum, Kala, and Pir, traveling off the main roads to avoid Agon's Crimson Warriors, are attacked instead by Jaggart and fellow bandit Bortho. Dar and his lion (Note: In the original 1982 film The Beastmaster, Ruh was a tiger dyed black to look like a panther, because tigers are easier to handle during filming. For the sequel Beastmaster 2 a Bengal tiger is used without the black dye. For the television movie Beastmaster 3 a lion was used instead of a tiger.) Ruh rescue the family, and spare the bandits. Dar offers to introduce Korum to his younger brother, King Tal of Aruk. At Tal's encampment, Korum laments that Agon conquered his homeland of Almbeth in a single day, seeking the stronghold of the ancient god Braxus. Tal deduces Agon is seeking a magical artifact to unleash evil upon the world, and orders his forces be mobilized to retake Almbeth. He gives Dar half of an heirloom amulet for safekeeping. At night, Crimson Warriors attack and abduct Tal. Dar teams with Tal's advisor Seth to rescue him.

Seeking immortality, Agon takes Tal's amulet, the Eye of Braxus, and tries to open the Tomb of Braxus, but it doesn't work; he needs the other half, and more strength. Agon orders Maldo to prepare another sacrifice.

After becoming lost in a magical fog, Seth and Dar meet mercenaries led by Shada, a Keshite warrior woman of the first rank. She tries to steal Dar's amulet but his ferrets Kodo and Podo had already taken it. Dar has Ruh wear it to "keep it safe from prying paws...and hands."

Agon subjects Tal to the Shroud of Agony to elicit the location of the other half of The Eye.

After becoming intimate, Shada shows Dar the way to Almbeth, but it's a ruse to lead them to the Mountain People, a savage Shambali tribe that captures Ruh, Dar, and Seth. Shada takes the amulet from Ruh's neck. With help from Kodo and Podo, and his eagle Sharak, Dar is cut loose and fights back. For sparing his life, Jaggart helps Dar and Seth fight the tribesmen, and informs Dar that Shada is Lord Agon's mercenary searching for the amulet. Dar finds Shada and recovers the amulet.

Agon learns from Tal's tortured mind that Dar has the other half of The Eye, and sends his Crimson Warriors to retrieve it.

Shada finally leads them to the entrance to Almbeth. Seth tells Dar that Braxus was the god of darkness, the Lord of the Pit with all the powers of Hell at his command. The amulet, therefore, must be kept from Agon. After rescuing Shada from a cobra, Dar and Seth meet Bey of the traveling troupe Madam Mystico & Company, who are to entertain Lord Agon with "feats of magical and acrobatic skills." Seth recognizes Madam Mystico as the witch Morgana, with whom he had a prior relationship. While they became reacquainted, Shada flees back to Agon. Morgana transforms Ruh into a housecat, Sharak into a dove, and Kodo and Podo into mice, then orders her charmed Crimson Warriors to capture Dar. Outraged, Seth wonders what she's up to. Morgana replies she's going to destroy The Eye once the two halves are reunited. They take the now-disguised animals and enter Almbeth.

Shada frees Dar from Agon's bonds in return for saving her from the cobra, and they meet up with Seth, Morgana, Bey, and Dar's animals which Morgana restores to their original forms. Dar and Shada free Tal, but Maldor captures Bey to make another sacrifice. Dar prevents the sacrifice but Agon uses The Key to free the Spirit of Braxus, which takes possession of Agon's body. Braxus places The Key onto his forehead as his third eye, the source of his power. Braxus opens the gate to Hell to call up his demons, but Dar and his ferrets knock Braxus' third eye free. Dar stabs the eye which blinds Braxus, allowing them to push Braxus into the hellish pit.

== Cast ==
- Marc Singer as Dar
- Tony Todd as Seth
- Keith Coulouris as Bey
- Sandra Hess as Shada
- Casper Van Dien as King Tal
- Patrick Kilpatrick as Jaggart
- Lesley-Anne Down as Morgana
- David Warner as Lord Agon
- Olaf Pooley as Maldor
- Michael S. Deak as Braxus
- David Grant Wright as Korum
- Kimberly Stanphill as Kala
- Joey Zimmerman as Pir
- Gary Simpson as Crimson Captain
- Lance Rushing as Crimson Warrior
- Dar Thompson as Guard
- J. D. Hall as Braxus (voice)

== Reception ==
On review aggregator Rotten Tomatoes, the film has an approval rating of 23% based on 8 reviews, with an average score of 2.4/5.
