= List of Beastmaster episodes =

Beastmaster is a sword and sorcery adventure television series. Inspired by the 1959 science fiction novel The Beast Master by Andre Norton, the series re-imagines the adventures of the Beastmaster based loosely upon Dar, the main character from the 1982 theatrical film, The Beastmaster.

The series aired 66 episodes over three complete seasons from 1999 to 2002.

== Series overview ==
Season	Episodes	Originally released	
Season	Episodes	First released	Last released
1	22	October 9, 1999	May 20, 2000
2	22	October 7, 2000	May 19, 2001
3	22	October 1, 2001	May 13, 2002

== Episodes ==
=== Season 1 (1999–2000) ===
No. overall	No. in season	Title	Directed by	Written by	Original release date
1	1	"The Legend Continues"	Michael Offer	Steve Feke	October 9, 1999
Prologue: Through the eyes of his black eagle, Sharak, Dar sees his beloved Kyra awaiting execution by brutal Terrons. They loose a white tiger which mauls a female prisoner. Dar races to save Kyra. While Dar infiltrates, a Bengal tiger attacks a Terron instead of the next prisoner, for Ruh knows who is innocent or not. Dar defeats the Terrons, but Kyra was taken. Freed, Tao reveals hearing of Dar; a Sula tribe warrior who communicates with animals, "The Beastmaster – Last of his tribe, blood enemy of the Terron," who massacred Dar's people. Scrying from her mountain stronghold, the Sorceress heard everything, and asks her master, the Ancient One, for advice, scheming to acquire Dar's priceless gift for herself. Kyra dances, but rebuffs King Zad's advances. For now, she remains unmolested. At the river, the Sorceress tricks Dar into an illusory shrine, summoning a fire-spewing chimera. Ruh helps Dar escape. Ruh, meaning "headstrong and powerful," protects Tao while Dar's ferrets, Kodo and Podo, spy Kyra's location in the Terron camp. But Kyra's crystal-pillared prison expels black mist, blinding Dar. Tao presents a white mist counter-agent, and an old Zambeze balm; "natural" magic that protects against fire. Returning for Krya, Dar finds the Sorceress wanting his gift. Prepared, Dar avoids the mist and slays the chimera, vowing to find Kyra.
2	2	"Obsession"	Michael Offer	Steve Feke	October 16, 1999
Sharak spots Terron horsemen chasing a Terron warrior, who Dar rescues. Zad banished Akili for desiring harem girl Shiloh, who the Sorceress enlists. Despite Tao's warning against Akili's obsession, Dar helps find Shiloh. Kyra tells Shiloh, Dar lives in the Mydlands; the Sorceress eavesdrops. A spider witch snares Dar descending a waterfall cliff. Akili attacks, saving Dar. At the lake, the Sorceress turns Shiloh into a hawk, confusing Akili, "I care only about Kyra....only one of us can have her." Akili attacks Dar, drawing Terrons who capture both, forcing a death-match. Dar wins with speed and precision a snake taught him. Confusion dispelled, they defeat the Terrons. The Sorceress draws Dar to learn how to communicate with animals, in exchange for Kyra. Dar attacks, but she disappears, "life is an illusion." Meanwhile, Ishmael's hunters capture an adolescent tiger cub. Slaver Baha buys humans and animals from the Prince, but one "owes me my son's life." The cub draws Ruh, who Baha says, "has a soul from another place." Ruh pins Baha who promises, "Kill me...or I will track you to the ends of the Earth." Ruh bites Baha's leg off, crippling him. Obsessed, Baha vows "I want its blood."
3	3	"The Island"	Ian Gilmour	Dawn Ritchie	October 23, 1999
Tao departs Dar's company to the village of Tolphet. He trades riddles for food while a dodging girl artfully steals bread from the grizzled vendor, who eyes Tao's jade ring, his tribe's badge, worn only by honoured Eiron scholars. They arrest Tao as a free-thinker, taking him with criminals to the island to die. Haisa hands Tao a comb for her beloved Nylas. Seeing through Sharak, Dar follows. Tolphets capture him to be drawn apart by oxen. Dar communicates, and the oxen release him. Haisa explains Tao's "crime of reason, making others think." Tolphets consider Eiron as "master tricksters...Wit is dangerous to the simple-minded." On the island, Elza is digested by a birdman's (Note: Neither the species nor race of the bat/bird-like humanoids – who digest by enveloping prey with their leathery "wings" – is ever mentioned in the original 1982 film The Beastmaster. However, in "The Island," screen end credits list Gabrielle Kozulin as Birdman 1, and Sean Rigby as Birdman 2.) leathery wings. Dar finds dormant birdmen hanging from branches like bats. Paj tries stealing Haisa's raft, which drifts away. Dar sinks in quicksand, attacked by Paj, who is consumed. Kodo and Podo save Dar with a vine. Tao, Nylas, and Haisa become trapped, but Ruh protects them against birdmen. Dar devises an escape plan when Sharak sees the girl-thief in another boat. With rope, Sharak and Ruh capture the boat. Dar fights guards as everyone boards. The birdmen pay homage when Sharak lands, then consume the guards.
4	4	"A Simple Truth"	Ian Gilmour	Carey Hayes & Chad Hayes	October 30, 1999
Dar stops Feno from killing a wolf, learning Terrons captured Feno's Mydlands friends during their rite of passage to find "one simple truth." Zad challenges Kyra to save their lives. Again, she warns, "If you take me, you can never win my heart." But Zad will "have her heart, or those boys will die." Kyra tells Naom she's leaving. She applies sleeping-potion lotion, incapacitating Zad. Sharak visits the Sorceress, who wonders, "Why was he here?" A wolf leads Kyra towards Dar. The Sorceress conjures a cougar to hunt Kyra for Zad, who argues, making Kyra love him against her will would be a fitting revenge. Sharak spots Kyra entering a village Feno recognizes as Cicada. The Ancient One describes consequences of human love amongst sorcerers; one "was condemned to immortality, given wings, and put into the sky," while the other's "memory of her lover and her emotions were taken away." An ogre captures Kyra; the cougar kills him. Kyra and Dar reunite. Ruh destroys the cougar. Dar and Feno defeat the Terrons. The Sorceress enchants two doves, spiriting Kyra away, "Teach me about this emotion, love." Again, the Ancient One warns against "trifling with the emotions of humans."
5	5	"Amazons"	Michael Offer	Dawn Ritchie	November 6, 1999
The Macodian governor Castrone interrupts two lovers, "I decide who marries," killing Maleena's lover. The Moon Goddess High Priestess vows to kill Castrone, tasking Shapeshifter to find Maleena. The Bone Collector's viper poisons Maleena. Sharak alerts Dar, who takes her out of Castrone's Pit of Death. Only the magical Fire Lily "bud of a water blossom" can save her. Thinking Dar and Tao are Macodian scouts, the Priestess plans to kill them. Artema volunteers, but Hyppolyte insists, believing them innocent. Dar enters the jungle alone; the Bone Collector tracks him. Dar warns Hyppolyte against attacking, convincing a white tiger to leave her alone. Tao creates a salve for Maleena's pain. Hyppolyte's report of Dar's kindness doesn't appease the Priestess, who sends the Seductress to "disarm" Dar. Tao uses leverage to haul Maleena into the trees while Ruh scares Macodians away. The Seductress fails to entice Dar. The Priestess remains resolute, "All men must be destroyed." Hyppolyte calls her "no better than Castrone." Dar finds the flower, but the pool magically freezes. Kodo and Podo tumble rocks which break the ice. Dar then battles Macodians; Hyppolyte helps defeat them. Sharak delivers the flower to Tao, saving Maleena, who joins the Amazons.
6	6	"The Demon Curupira"	Brendan Maher	Ralph L. Thomas	November 13, 1999
The boy Guariba observes the demon Curupira sucking out the lifeforce from over-zealous hunters, and breathing their energy back into boars they slew, restoring them to life. Curupira also intends to feed on Guariba's life. Hearing Guariba's story, Dar recalls his boyhood, encountering Curupira, believing her "the Protector of the Sulas." But she protects animals, not people. To save Kyra, young Dar had asked, "Give me the powers you gave my father. I'll learn from the animals." But Curupira "can't give animal powers to just anyone." Dar recalls kissing the woman in the pool, despite loving Kyra. Curupira chided, he would never pass her grueling three-day tests. After passing, he found Ruh and Sharak, who he understood. Presently: Dar convinces Curupira to spare Guariba if his tribe stops abusing the jungle. But Guariba's mother and village leader are alarmed that Dar speaks to demons. Their medicine man claims Guariba is the demon, binding him in the canopy. Escaping, Guariba and Dar intercept tribesmen heading to the hunting camp, allowing Guariba time to plead with Curupira to spare them. She finally consents, revealing the hunters' desiccated corpses so villagers will believe Guariba. He relays how they might coexist with the jungle.
7	7	"The Umpatra"	Allan Eastman	Simon Heath	November 20, 1999
Dar finds an elephant, his "wise old friend," slain, heart cut out, and marked by yellow and blue handprints from which Tao knows, "an Umpatra warrior did this." The demon Ketzwayo magically appears, warning Dar, "You are next." From jungle cover, Nokinja throws spears, which Dar deflects. Curupira berates Dar for failing to protect the animals. She leaves him for snakes to decide whether he lives or dies. Nokinja catches and binds Ruh and Sharak. Curupira tries sucking out Nokinja's life, but it's really Ketzwayo, who vows to destroy Curupira. Since neither can kill the other, they battle by proxy through Nokinja and Dar for dominance of the Mydlands. Nokinja makes camp with Tao, trying to seduce Dar. He wakes to find his ferrets gone, finally realising, she is the Umpatra. The Ancient One reminds Curupira, Ketzwayo is "protected from harm because he possesses the soul of a human. Her name is Nokinja." Nokinja wins the battle, but Dar accuses her of fighting dishonourably, having been empowered by demon magic. Nokinja confronts Ketzwayo. Dar grabs Ketzwayo's moon pendant and defeats Nokinja. Dishonoured, she throws her spear into the air to impale herself. No longer protected, Curupira sucks out Ketzwayo life.
8	8	"The Last Unicorns"	Brendan Maher	Steven Whitney	November 27, 1999
Dar and Tao explore the Downs, finding Terron horse tracks. Princess Jessica enters the forest from the maze with fruit for unicorns; the third is missing – Terrons kill it for its horn – Jessica screams. Dar finds blue blood and tracks of tigers – protectors of magical creatures. The Chancellor imprisons Dar and Tao in a pit, and delivers the horn to Zad, demonstrating its healing power. Zad wants the last two alive for breeding. Kodo and Podo lower a rope; Dar and Tao fight the cook to escape. With Kyra "under his skin," the Ancient One shows the Sorceress how he has "felt her youth, beauty, and love...growing younger." Sharak visits, "haunting" her, leaving blue blood. The Chancellor sends Jessica to the unicorns, planning to kill her, usurping her kingdom. Terrons take the unicorns. Dar saves Jessica. The Ancient One transforms Sharak into his Sorcerer form, revealing he told the Sorceress everything (in "A Simple Truth"). Sharak warns about the danger to the unicorns, before reverting to eagle form. Dar and Ruh gather six tiger-protectors to outnumber four Terron guards, while Jessica and Tao rescue the unicorn. Zad kills the Chancellor. The Sorceress, who created them, sends the unicorns to safety.
9	9	"Circle of Life"	Peter Andrikidis	Steve Feke	December 4, 1999
In the Burning Forest, where dead souls suffer when the circle of life ends, Ketzwayo declares, "I was dead...from the fire, I am reborn," aided by the evil Black Apparition. (Note: The first appearance of the Black Apparition character is a non-speaking role credited to Alex Coleman, whereas remaining appearances are portrayed by Leah Purcell. Later episodes either omit Purcell's role name in opening screen credits, or list her in end credits variably as "The Apparition" or "Black Apparition.") Curupira finds a tiger slain and tasks Dar to find its killer, revealed to be Ketzwayo, "The beginning of the end for nature and the animal kingdom." The Apparition assigns heavily muscled protectors to keep Ketzwayo safe. Animals of like-kind turn on each other; tiger killing tiger, hippopotamus attacking hippopotamus, even Dar berates Tao. Animals no longer communicate with Dar; Ruh attacks him. Dar apologizes to Tao, who believes sorcery or magic is infecting them. Tao reads writings Curupira found; "Its over for you and for the Beastmaster, too, revenge is sweet, dearie little funny feet," revealing its author, Ketzwayo. Ketzwayo captures Kodo and Podo to deliver a "special" strawberry. The Ancient One tells Curupira how Ketzwayo was reborn. Tao stops Dar from eating the strawberry, tossing it away where it explodes. They enter the Burning Forest, where Dao fights three protectors, defeating them one by one. Ketzwayo runs; Curupira kills him, "This time, it's forever." She consigns his desiccated husk to the flames, and nature returns to normal.
10	10	"Riddle of the Nymph"	Brendan Maher	Rob Baird & Kelly Senecal	January 15, 2000
Venatu warriors Sararmago and Cappo chase the children Muraki and Aron through the jungle, "Take me to the waters." Muraki runs as Sararmago kills Aron, who reverts to a man of fifty. The Ancient One warns the Sorceress, Zad will inquire why she has not yet delivered Kyra. Karstyn imprisons Muraki for betraying their community, which Dar and Tao find – all children. Sararmago finds the ensorcelled Nymph in their grotto – the source of their youth. Sararmago kills Cappo to keep her for himself. Tao drinks Nymph-enchanted waters, becoming a young boy. The Sorceress deflects Zad's inquiry, suggesting a more sophisticated lover. Young Tao infiltrates Karstyn's community as Teemu, but they recognize Muraki's male lion cub, Farah, deducing Tao's identity. Dar finds the Nymph; Sararmago knocks him unconscious. Kodo and Podo chew Sararmago's rope to prevent Dar's hanging. Zad tries wooing the Sorceress, in vain. Dar battles Sararmago, who inadvertently drinks the Nymph's water; now a child, he flees. The Nymph pleads, "solve the riddle. Free me." Dar rescues Muraki and Tao from execution. Tao solves the riddle, freeing the Nymph. Karstyn, Stokk and Banta, now adults, attack. Dar defeats them. Farah, having reverted to a fully-grown lion, scars them away.
11	11	"Valhalla"	Ian Gilmour	Grahame Bond & Maurice Murphy	January 22, 2000
Dar fails to save an animal's mother from Terrons, causing a flashback of his own mother's murder for which he blames himself; he passes out. Tao takes him to the Shaman, who shows Tao a vision of Dar's memories, which his soul is reliving in Valhalla. Dar sees his father (the former Beastmaster), his younger self, and his mother. Also present are Akili (from "Obsession") and his Terron warrior father. Curupira rebukes Dar's father for protecting his family, not her tigers, demanding his staff. "Save my tigers...find the answers in your wife's ashes." Dar relives Terrons killing his mother, and her funeral pyre. Dar helps save young Akili from an alligator. Dar's father finds his staff in his wife's ashes, now having totem sigils marking Sanctuary. Akili's father kills Dar's father; young Dar retrieves his staff. Meanwhile, Terrons slay the remainder of his Sula tribe, taking young Kyra away. Young Dar wants to save her, but Dar reminds his younger self, he must take the tigers to Sanctuary first. Akili's father follows. Curupira calls him "a pathetic thing, threatening my animals. Don't you know the rules of my forest?" Curupira drains his life. Dar takes the tigers to Sanctuary.
12	12	"The Slayer"	Chris Martin-Jones	Dawn Ritchie	January 29, 2000
Dar encounters Zuraya training her wolf, Slayer. He invites her to camp, but she urgently rides away. He tells Tao about his attraction, despite loving Kyra. Later, Zuraya trains Slayer to kill. Baha's slavers raid Zuraya's traveling circus faire. The Seer warns, "Killing the Dark One...won't free you." A wizard cursed Zuraya to loneliness, riding every night searching for a man of shadows. The Seer's vision is jumbled; Zuraya assumes the man is Dar. The Sorceress remembers her lover Sharak, and their plot to overthrow the Ancient One. She promises "to reverse this curse." Mahmood mentions seeing Ruh, who maimed Baha (in "Obsession"). Baha convinces Zuraya that Dar "is the Dark One." She traps Dar to cut his clothing, providing Slayer his scent to kill him. The Sorceress confronts the Ancient One for punishing Zuraya. The Seer insists he "remove the curse," reminding, "Love created this world." Forgetting that "will be your undoing." Zuraya orders Slayer to attack Dar. The Sorceress freezes Slayer mid-leap, wishing "to communicate with Sharak." Dar refuses. Zuraya tries again; Tao convinces her, Baha enslaved her people. Together they free Zuraya's friends, driving Baha away. She thanks Dar, "Perhaps we'll meet again one day."
13	13	"The Minotaur"	Brendan Maher	Steve Feke	February 5, 2000
Terrons warn Minoans to contribute men and women or cease to exist. They throw a village man to Zad's Minotaur, the Ancient One's gift. Baha plots with Ishmael to obtain Zad's beast. Minoans capture Tao for their tribute quota. Sharak spots Tao, who is thrown into the Minotaur's labyrinth. Kodo and Podo distract guards; Dar enters undetected. Tao observes the Minotaur dancing before Melora. The Ancient One describes its curse, "to survive, it must devour human flesh." It pins Dar, who communicates to his animal bull-head. Dar rescues Melora; going back for Tao he finds Baha. The Sorceress helps Dar, as she needs his help to get Kyra back (from the Ancient One). As a test, she tasks Dar to take the Minotaur away from King Zad. She provides a path to find Tao as good faith. They escape but Baha's man holds Melora at knife-point; they want the Minotaur, who acquiesces to protect her. Ruh leaps onto Baha. Tao attacks the knife-wielder with techniques Dar taught him. Dar defeats the rest. The Sorceress lifts the Minotaur's spell. Now human, he and Melora can be together. "Not all of my sorcery is evil," the Sorceress tells Dar.
14	14	"The Guardian"	Michael Pattinson	Tom Szollosi	February 12, 2000
Ramah leads "pilgrims" whom the Guardian attacks as a lion, killing three. Tao follows the "seekers." Dar, tracking the lion, instead finds a mystical woman in white, "They are not holy men...They must leave the mountain." Nearing the gate, Ramah declares, they "will soon see the power of the liquid rock." Manjusa explains, they seek "the gateway to life and death." Tao warns them away, but the Guardian strikes again. Ramah binds Manjusa to bait the Guardian. Dar battles his men while Ramah escapes. The Guardian kills another as Ramah takes the rock. Now in command, Ramah orders the Guardian to kill the Beastmaster. Ramah kills Manjusa with it, "He who holds the gate...is the gate." Sharak lands, his immortality a sign to the Guardian that "the Beastmaster lives." Ruh attacks Ramah, who kills Ruh with the rock. Dar knocks the rock away with his staff, allowing the Guardian to kill Ramah. Dar mourns the death of Ruh. Tao convinces the woman to restore Ruh's life. Meanwhile, the Sorceress casts a spell which the Ancient One redirects back upon her. As punishment, he restores her memory of "messy human emotions" so she will suffer over losing her beloved Sharak.
15	15	"The Chameleon"	Ian Gilmour	Steve Feke & Steven Whitney	February 19, 2000
The Sorceress reads Zad's fortune, "Death. It's coming for you...a child...it will grow fast." Sharak spots a baby boy, saving it from an alligator. Dar witnesses the boy camouflaging, chameleon-like. Tao recognizes the basket weaving from Samaria. Zad offers a ransom, but needs the Sorceress "to know the right child." She creates magical mobiles for the Shadow of Death to recognize and bring him. The Samarian Chiron abducts the boy for Zad's reward. The mother, Mara, relays Zad's fears of a great warrior-king who unites the tribes against him. The Ancient One warns the Sorceress, tampering with fate is dangerous, creating eternal enemies like the Apparition. For selling his son to Terrons, Geza attacks Chiron. Mara stops Geza from murdering Chiron, who will be punished "like the angels said, when it is his time....they gave us our son." The Sorceress thinks him more useful to her than Zad, losing the Shadow which possesses Mara, who takes him from Tao. Geza tries stopping her, in vain. Mara-Death attacks Dar with a sickle; Tao reflects sunlight with mica, casting out the Shadow, and saving Dar. The Sorceress lies to Zad that, "Death has the child." Dar rescues children that Zad kidnapped.
16	16	"A Devil's Deal"	Ian Gilmour	Steve Feke & Steven Whitney	February 26, 2000
Conquering another town, King Zad orders Prince Mah-Gah found. Instead, a strange, mute, amphibious woman is discovered. Thinking the Beastmaster can communicate with her, Zad has Tao abducted to force Dar's cooperation. As added incentive, the Sorceress poses as Kyra, but Kodo and Podo witness her vanishing. The woman wants proof Dar is a beastmaster, "not a trick of sorcery sent to gain my secrets." Dar calls for Ruh, and she reveals herself as Atlantia, who rules her people as Queen; Mah-Gah is "a false target for my enemies." Her city is neither a fortress, nor finished, but meant as a haven, a safe refuge where all tribes can live in harmony. She is not a product of sorcery, but of evolution. Tao plans an illusion for Zad. Dar sends Zad in the wrong direction after Mah-Gah and defeats his remaining Terron guards, allowing the Queen to return to Atlantis. Meanwhile, the Sorceress asks what the Ancient One meant about the Apparition; "for one of you, it would not turn out well." He replies, "A devil's deal...I should never have made." He confronts the Apparition he created, calling her "Daughter of Darkness," but for now she says nothing.
17	17	"Tears of the Sea"	Michael Pattinson	Chad Hayes & Carey Hayes	March 4, 2000
Tusi dives for valuable sea stones. A dolphin bumps a shark so Tusi can board his father Mataffa's boat. Tusi credits the Empress of the Sea, but Mataffa scoffs, the Ancestors are only a myth. Dar visits friends of Kyra's mother, who was born there. The dolphin again helps Tusi's initiation rite of passage, diving deeper than ever for pink coral. Later, Tusi witnesses Gilan clubbing Nutoa to steal his stones. Gilan chases Tusi, who falls from a cliff into the sea, dead. Dar, Tao and Mataffa find Nutoa alive, Tusi's clothing below, and a cut vine above. After Tusi's funeral, a dolphin leads Dar to an underwater cave with an atmosphere and spirits of Tusi and his dead mother Sanu. A vision shows Dar what happened. The Sorceress reunites, wanting Sanu to convince Dar to trust her, as friends, to learn to communicate with animals. To reveal Tusi's killer, Tao and Dar announce Tusi lives, and returns soon. The Sorceress tells Dar, "watch. See a myth become a reality...even...a miracle." The dolphin helps Dar catch Gilan sailing away. They struggle. Gilan is pulled under by two dolphins; the spirits of Tusi and Sanu, who visit Leilani one last time.
18	18	"The Burning Forest"	Pino Amenta	Steven Whitney	April 22, 2000
The Apparition tricks the Sorceress into captivity beneath the Burning Forest. The Ancient One tasks Sharak to free her using his human form, but concealing his true identity. Curupira finds Baha skinning animal hides, vowing to kill every last tiger, then the Beastmaster. Sharak, Dar and Tao search the Burning Forest. The Apparition tells the Sorceress they both want the Ancient One overthrown. Sentinels try to destroy Dar's party, first capturing Tao, who meets fellow Eiron, Caro. The Apparition reveals she was his student long before the Sorceress. When he betrayed her, she "embraced the darkness...real power." She claims, "I can give you the powers of the Beastmaster. I will also give you Sharak," as a man. She proposes joining forces to kill the Ancient One, who, scrying them, becomes enraged. Sensing deception, the Sorcerer refuses. The Ancient One distracts the Apparition. Mahmood digs a tiger pit. Curupira jokes, they dig their own graves. Baha, not Ruh, is impaled. Curupira drains Baha's life, "I'm vengeance." Tao unlocks their cell to freedom. Sharak rescues the Sorceress. The Ancient One removes her memories again, as Sharak flies away. His hide hanging with the others, Baha opens his eyes.
19	19	"The Golden Phoenix"	Chris Martin-Jones	Ethlie Ann Vare	April 29, 2000
The last Golden Phoenix lands and transforms into Prince Garuda "It is a good day to die." For Redemption Time, the Argon high priest's daughter Sella applies ash to her face. Her captor, Terron War Chief Qord mocks her ritual. With a trapped wombat, Garuda captures Dar, who must die for failing his duty as Sula leader to "guard one golden urn," ensuring "The Song of the Phoenix" moves the sun so Sula crops continue to grow. Regardless that Terrons massacred Sulas, the urn guarantees Garuda's immortality. He tells Dar, seek the "pretender to an evil throne...who bears the mark of the Phoenix on his face." Meanwhile, Zad's "ardour" demands high-born Sella. Qord removes her to his underground treasure trove, intending to usurp Zad's kingship. Dar surveils the Terron camp, tasking Tao and Ruh to find Garuda's altar. His ferrets spot the scarred man, Qord; Dar follows him. By scrying, the Sorceress shows Zad where Dar is confronting Qord. They fight, and eventually, Ruh scares Qord away. Sella recovers the golden urn from Qord's trove for Dar. Together they go to place it on the altar, where the Golden Phoenix is reborn from Garuda's ashes.
20	20	"Gemini"	Pino Amenta	Matt Weisman	May 6, 2000
Nye and Jem shoot a Terron and pierce entangling vines, spewing corrosive poison that dissolves his flesh. Dar and Tao find them in a stream, naked. Nye likes Tao's "beautiful eyes." They complete each other's sentences; "a creature...it exists only to destroy...it kills...and kills...until nothing is left but death...and silence." More Terrons attack; Jem kills one, Dar drives another away, "There's no need to kill." Tao discovers they are twins – who kiss. In the morning, Terrons chase Adranna. Dar fights three; the fourth chases Adranna into the woods. The vines constrict him to death, then entangle Tao, Adranna and Dar. She yells, "The heart!" Dar throws his staff and the blade pierces and kills it, releasing them. Later, Nye and Jem capture Adranna to bait Tao and Dar so they can "play" with and kill them. Observing Adranna's powerlessness, and angry that the Ancient One curses her memories, mocks her tears, takes her lover and her unicorns, the Sorceress determines to act. Tao "emotionally separates" Nye, distracting the twins. Dar attacks; Tao frees Adranna. Jem inadvertently stabs a vine, splashing Nye's neck. Jem joins her in death. The Sorceress throws them into the night sky to become the constellation Gemini.
21	21	"Rescue"	Richard Franklin	Dawn Ritchie	May 13, 2000
Dar sees Terrons taking more slaves, but Qord and Yort kill their fellow Terrons. The Sorceress disturbs the Ancient One's spell on Sharak, changing back to human form so they can be together, albeit briefly, before he reverts to an eagle. Qord lies to Zad, blaming Dar for killing his men The Ancient One releases Kyra to meet her destiny, back in Zad's camp. Zad wants to take his "Sula vixen" but hasn't forgotten her sleep potion (in "A Simple Truth"). Sharak spots Kyra with Zad. Posing as Terron, Tao brings Dar to Zad's yurt to free her, but Tao is caught and bound. Dar sends his ferrets to free him. To discover who plots against him, Zad asks the Sorceress to disguise him; she makes him an ass, literally, and Tao rides him through the camp to freedom. Dar rescues Kyra, escaping by boat, just as Zad's and Qord's forces battle each other. At their Sanctuary, Dar and Kyra reunite. Later, Qord finds Tao, "There's no need to fear me...I meant you no harm. Zad is the true enemy," but his uprising failed. He tries enlisting Dar against Zad, but Dar can never trust him.
22	22	"Revelations"	Ian Gilmour	Steve Feke	May 20, 2000
The Ancient One casts a trance upon the Sorceress to "return a favour...The Fates will it." He tells the Beastmaster, these revelations are a gift. The Sorceress tells Dar, your "world is about to change...You're going to be different...We have a future, together." Zad hunts Qord, who again fails enlisting Dar against Zad. Terrons chases Kyra, who slips off a cliff, barely hanging on. Dar swings from a vine, grabbing her. Qord throws his axe at Dar. Seeing it, Kyra turns them to shield Dar. After her funeral pyre, Tao tries convincing Dar against vengeance. The Apparition tells Dar, the Ancient One, who "took your woman," also took her own lover, so she too seeks vengeance. She claims she can give him Kyra, "All it takes is your soul -- a small price....When you kill Qord, whether you choose it or not, you will be mine." Qord's man Marak is delivered to Zad, who trades blows on horseback with Qord. Dar intercepts Qord, knocking him down. Zad arrives, "He's mine," executing Qord by snakebite. The Sorceress says to Qord's corpse, "Life is a dream, and yours has not yet ended." Dar accompanies Tao, who is going home to see Caro.

=== Season 2 (2000–01) ===
No. overall	No. in season	Title	Directed by	Written by	Original release date
23	1	"Manlinks"	Ian Gilmour	Steve Feke	October 7, 2000
Traveling to his Middle of the World home through the rainforest, Tao is captured. Dar finds a woman's tracks. Zad finds his men slain, seemingly by what the Ancient One calls a manlink, which the Sorceress describes; "part ape, part man." Terrons snare the woman's neck; Dar frees Arina. Terrons killed her people at Namib in the Great Deserts; Nords named her after "wildflower." Tao and manlink Doe write to learn about each other. Zad tries wooing Curupira, who tosses him like a ragdoll, "feel my lips another day." The Sorceress finds Zad with her "third eye" (Baha's). Tor describes glaciers destroying the Uplands; Tao, while trying to escape the canopy, is saved by Doe. Dar and Arina climb to rescue friends; Zad barks, "Bring me fire." Manlink Rafiki attacks Arina; Dar "communicates" peaceful intent. Everyone jumps down to avoid fire and battle Terrons. Curupira intercepts Zad, "Burn my forest? I should burn you...with a kiss." Instead, she scalds his face with "hot breath" and summons rain to douse fires. Rafiki claims someone framed manlinks for killing Terrons. The Sorceress confronts, "Clever, but evil," taking Arina's Nord-metal dagger. Arina remarks, making this strange world ours will take work.
24	2	"Iara"	Pino Amenta	Ralph Thomas	October 14, 2000
Tribesmen throw an old man off Mercy Hill. Dar saves a mother, who insists, "I have to die," or starve. Her son Brin and all young men went chasing "shark-women." Ruh protects her from tribesmen; Dar and Tao row to the island. Beautiful women greet them, claiming various reasons why men are absent. Iara convinces them to stay and train them to fight, but they are already capable. Tao only finds male pigs, which cannot talk to Dar. When their archer flirts with Tao, Iara bites, transforming him into a pig. Iara fails to seduce Dar, who searches up the mountain for Tao. Meanwhile, the village headman agrees to sell Ruh's "parts." Curupira catches their spears, and kiss-drains a tribesman, "There...One less mouth to feed." Bor tells Dar, the women only mate with warriors. Iara will release the men if Dar mates her. The Sorceress realises Iara scares Curupira without "real" island animals providing advantage. She enchants Dar's eyes to see the demon Iara's true form; a serpent. Iara attacks the Sorceress. After Dar is knocked out, Iara lets him leave with the men, having conspired to "get rid of that nuisance Curupira," so the Sorceress can, "get your Beastmaster's powers."
25	3	"Seer"	Brendan Maher	Ralph Thomas	October 21, 2000
To escape, Uplands seer Olwen blindly pushes Terron captors. Sharak alerts Dar, who follows Olwen, cliff-diving to waters below. An evil magician cursed Olwen for loving Matteus. Everyone exploits her thought-reading. Arina follows her. Tao pushes a Terron into a beehive. Defeating two more, Dar and Olwen become friends. Wanting Olwen, Zad enlists the Sorceress, who tasks him, discover Arina's purpose. With her third eye, Zad finds Dar, who defeats Zad single-handedly. Ruh trees Arina, freeing Dar to ask Olwen to read Arina's thoughts; "strange, undefined." Confronted directly, Arina claims good news for Olwen, who "sees" Matteus. Olwen hugs Arina. Dar has Sharak "keep watch." The Sorceress calls Zad "soft, weak...deluded and useless," for not discovering Alina's purpose. Olwen eventually sees Arina's "thoughts...they're lies." Arina uses her blade, "You're coming with me." Ruh with another tiger-friend stops Arina. The Sorceress asks Arina's intention; she wants the Seer, not the Beastmaster. Dar arrives, "let her go." Arina, "She's too important." Arina draws her Nord-metal blade, battling Dar. His strength eventually overcomes her. "Enough?" Arina, "You won't kill me." Dar, "No? I have a better idea....I can't say the same for Ruh," who trees her again. Olwen leaves alone to destinations unknown.
26	4	"Orpheo"	Ray Quint	Tom Szollosi	October 28, 2000
Prologue: Emerging from the underworld with his black panther, Orpheo has until sunset to take Alina "home." His animals disturbed, Dar hears "a new voice." Snake slain, Iara screams, "demanding revenge," or Dar's friend will die. Arina helps find "this panther." The Ancient One suggests Iara release Tao, who escapes her viper pit. Orpheo reunites with his lover Arina, who thought him dead after their "final battle." Orpheo surmises Arina has slept with Dar (in "Manlinks"), insisting, "We must go now." Meanwhile, Tao found the "Thorn of the Mountain...power to slay evil spirits." Dar felt the panther's evil, seeing hellacious visions. Tao defines "familiars...an evil servant from an evil spirit from beyond the grave." Dar determines to save Arina. Orpheo attacks, throwing Dar with inhuman strength. Arina pleads, "Spare his life...I will come." The Ancient One tells Iara, Orpheo is taking Arina to "the world beneath the world." Iara reasons, "he's dead...she's not...that's" Orpheo's only way back to the netherworld. Realising this, Arina refuses, but Orpheo spared Dar's life for her. The Ancient One explains, Opheo wants Arina's soul freely given, "A dark love is...selfish and terrible." Orpheo raises a dagger, "to be together." Arina rejects suicide, "It mocks every Namib who died with honour." Orpheo's panther attacks Dar, who accepts Tao's thorn, piercing the panther, returning it to the netherworld; Orpheo collapses but cannot share Arina, "Either way, you die." Without Orpheo's familiar, Dar triumphs.
27	5	"Xinca"	Ian Gilmour	Steve Feke	November 4, 2000
Tao arrives at the Middle of the World, finding "mirrors, jade...obsidian." Dar senses Maloc watching through huaca. In Xinca, Tao notices none wearing Eiron rings. Maloc rouses priests, "Seize him!" Outnumbered, Caro helps Dar escape. Imprisoned, Tao explains, elders sent him as emissary to the world to learn and spread philosophy. But Malo's brotherhood has "cleansed" Eiron "preachings...science...intellectual filth." Sharak locates Tao's cell. Podo finds Caro. Zad asks the Ancient One about "ships...off my coast." Dar reenters Xinca through tunnels. Maloc plans to kill him. Caro explains many Eiron were killed; only a handful escaped to the mountains. She remained as witness, informing the people. Caro and Dar take priests robes, and prevent Tao's sacrifice. Tao promises to join Caro in the mountains, soon. Meanwhile, Hjalmar's men rendezvous with Arina, "Terrons will not be missed." King Voden invades. Arina infiltrates Zad's yurt, exacting vengeance for her slain mother. Against her Nord sword, Zad's "weapons are useless...out of date." She easily defeats Zad. Voden demands Zad reveal "The Beastmaster. Tell me where he is...or you die." The Sorceress frees Zad, "with conditions....become a new person. Undergo a sea change...go to the mountains." Taking a Nord sword, he promises "hell to pay."
28	6	"Ghosts of the Forest"	Ian Gilmour	Jim Henshaw	November 11, 2000
Arina disciplines Yoken to strengthen tiger cages, Voden's lure for Dar. Tao becomes dispirited; thieving, murderous priests rule Xinca, undermining his Eiron mission. Nords trap Ruh's mother Tiala. Ruh attacks, freeing Dar and Tao to help Tiala seek "the Archway of the Spirits where tigers go to die." Zoden punishes Yoken's failure; Dar's "beasts he should command for me" – weapons to destroy. Tao worries for his family. (Note: It is revealed in "Ghosts of the Forest" that Tao has a brother named Kim (played by Steve Bacic in "Tao's Brother"), who is not an Eiron, but more like Dar, a fighter. His mother is Lana, wife of San the teacher. He does not know what has become of them after Xinca fell to corrupt Eirons, now called blood priests, who embraced the dark side thirsting for pleasure and power.) Sharak spies Arina tracking. Caro conceals Tao, but priests attack; Dar defeats them. Sneaking, Dar asks why Alina helps Voden, "it serves my purpose," and he helped defeat her Terron enemies. Dar agrees to meet after helping Tiala. Eavesdropping, Yoken gets reinforcements to kill Arina and regain Voden's favour. Dar and Tao climb from a cliff-fall, meeting Eirons Han and Alau. Wanting Tao, priests capture Caro to enlist Voden. Yoken's Nords unsuccessfully attack Dar. Bound, Alina warns Yoken, Voden comes. Tao proposes probing priests' weaknesses via infiltration; "We stop living in fear...ghosts to one another." Wanting "friendship," Voden releases Caro, allowing Dar to help Tiala – "favours" to "be repaid." A ghostly tiger leads Tiala through the Archway. Arina kills Yoken, saving Dar, "I thought you were on their side." Arina, "So did I."
29	7	"Rage"	Richard Franklin	Sharon Buckingham	November 18, 2000
Dar and Tao enter Xinca. Challenged to spar, Dar gets tossed into mud, sprinkled with feathers. Dar tells Tao how self-control allows mastery. Thrown into mud himself, Bahktiar growls animalistically, leaping impossibly high walls. Dar finds Bahktiar's jungle tracks changing into animal. The Sorceress reveals a puma as Bahktiar, who transforms when angered. Using Tao's advice, Dar talks, calming Bahktiar. Voden enlists Tao to help his mother Margret's mute "sorrow, fear, rage." They learn Voden's jealousy of his brother Bahktiar "grew into deceit and wickedness....very cruel," turning everyone against Bahktiar, whose subsequent rage poisoned him. Margret enlisted her sorcerer-lover, whose condition was sending Bahktiar away forever, cursed to change upon raging. "If Voden finds him, he will kill us both." Bahktiar determines to free Margret, as a man. The Ancient One, "So you shall...never more a puma be." He admits to loving Margret; his one error, meddling in "piddling emotions of human beings." The Sorceress retorts, "afraid of feelings....you're a coward." He casts a spell, imprisoning her forever. Bahktiar distracts Voden; Dar and Ruh free Margret. Bahktiar and Dar fight Voden's men, who holds Tao at sword-edge. Sharak swoops upon a guard, allowing Tao's escape. Mother and son reunite.
30	8	"White Tiger"	Richard Franklin	Steve Feke	November 25, 2000
Iara takes Curupira's white tiger Mohan into her "world...water and mist...kill for me," promising to make him human. Curupira warns Dar about death in the mist. Mohan chases Kodo and Podo into water. Ruh and Sharak disappear in mist. Iara loves Dar and will take him from Curupira, changing appearance; Fate only gives one death – which will kill you, Beastmaster? Dar fights Zad and the Apparition's Sentinel, alone. Curupira, seeking the Sorceress' help, learns the Ancient One replaced her. Tao disappears next. Destine declares, "Now you're alone, Beastmaster....It's your time now." Curupira tasks Dar, if she also disappears, "Save my white tiger." Iara incapacitates Curupira with mist, water, and snakes, then appears as "Destine, fate, kismet, destiny...whichever." Iara tells Dar that Mohan lies in wait and he cannot talk to him; "I have Curupira. Your powers come from her. And she's not coming back...ever." Regardless, Dar reasons with Mohan, not to fight, but tell the truth; Iara cursed and lied to Mohan about making him human. He pays respect as "a servant to you and your kingdom." Iara will not release Curupira unless Dar comes with her. She returns Dar's friends, but will not be generous next time.
31	9	"Heart Like a Lion"	Pino Amenta	Bill Searle	December 2, 2000
Reon protests, the lion Arjuna is just a cub. Kalex, "You're right...we'll kill him next year. This year, it's his mother's turn." Beautiful Layla's flashing blue eyes enchant Tao. Meeting Dar, Reon informs him animals are being sacrificed to Arkon, self-proclaimed "Lord...saviour and protector. He's a liar, a thief...evil man." Kalex captures Ruh as well. Dar discovers he cannot talk to the caged, drugged animals. Reon insists Arkon is a fraud, but deluded Padma is "honoured" to be "chosen." High Priest Khadro accepts their "magnificent offering." Arkon appears in a flash, claiming three more priestesses for his bed. Layla ensorcells Tao with "Food, drink...anything your heart desires." Trying to save Padma, Reon is hit by Kalex, who Dar fights, drawing Arkon's warriors. Arkon summons a wall of fire and a serpent bites Dar. Woozy, he calls a horse to escape. Seeing peaches disappearing/reappearing, Tao laughs, breaking Layla's ensorcellment. Waking, Dar realises an illusory snake nearly killed him. At Arkon's tournament, Tao returns Dar's staff, warning against Arkon's eyes. Dar and Kalex fight a death-match. Arkon ensorcells Dar, whom Kalex hits. Tao, "Laugh...Dar!" Dar breaks the spell, defeats Kalex, urging him "Laugh." Eventually, everyone laughs, breaking Arkon's mass illusion.
32	10	"Gone"	Karl Zwicky	Peter Lauterman	January 20, 2001
Nords take a wolf mother from her pup. Voden, "Can you hear...Beastmaster?" Dar protects a Tasmanian tiger from Neando hunter Kaleb, "that monster killed my wife and children." He will kill anyone obstructing his vengeance. Nords net the thylacine, trap Ruh defending him, and thwart Kaleb's attack. Dar determines to free them. Tao calls it suicide. Arina overhears Voden use for animals; "to enslave the world." Dar's ferrets start fire. Freeing Kaleb, Dar fights Nords, who break his bone staff. He must run. Kaleb knocks him out to go kill the thylacine. Dissuading Kaleb, Arina admits, "I knew vengeance once...against King Zad...I am now bound to a greater darkness." In Voden's arena, Kaleb and thylacine wound each other. Dar proves "Nords killed your family." "Liar!" Kaleb attacks Dar. His ferrets free Ruh, who frees the rest. Voden allows it, having lured Dar. Tao fails three sword-making attempts; the Sorceress fixes Dar's staff. Cloth Arina got from Voden to bandage Kaleb belonged to his wife. Kaleb helps Dar against Voden. Tao returns Dar's staff. Saving Kaleb from a Nord surreptitiously, Arina returns to Voden's side after their escape. The thylacine chooses to live with Kaleb – both, the last of their kind.
33	11	"Golgotha"	Ian Gilmour	Tony DiFranco	January 27, 2001
The girls think Marika is safe from attacks "because Karpen is the spirit healer." Dar rescues her from a crocodile, but bite wounds are different, and poisoned. The Head Elder mentions "phantom crocodiles" stealing their women at night. Tao's salve draws poison out; Karpen insists he leave, arguing with the Elder about "going back to the old ways," worshiping the crocodile god. Iara tells Dar he cannot help them. That night, two women disappear. Tao reports "crocodiles...teeth and claws," but "walked like men, carrying them on their backs." Karpen accuses hostilely, imprisoning Tao. Ruh scares off Karpen and three who track Dar. Iara confirms sacrifices. Men in crocodile costumes bind Dar for sacrifice. Tao escapes and finds an antidote for Marika. The one-eyed crocodile cuts Dar's binding, telling him they were starving for lack of fish, resorting to cannibalism. Dar informs the village, and Tao tells about the dam he found, which explains missing fish. Marika recalls, the elders made fishing easier. Dar leaves to tear down the dam, but Karpen takes Tao and Marika to be sacrificed. The one-eyed crocodile helps Dar, ramming the dam. Karpen attacks Dar, who flips him into the water where crocodiles eat him.
34	12	"Tao's Brother"	Colin Budds	Tony DiFranco	February 3, 2001
Tao hears a new leader plans to attack the Brotherhood. A merchant and his wife lie to save their daughter from Maloc. Kim challenges blood priests' power, rousing citizens, "Fight this evil...Now!" Dar helps Kim; Maloc flees. Investigating animal absence, Dar confronts a Nord foreman, overseen by Arina, who reveals Voden's world-conquering plans "extending to the four corners...All roads lead to Xinca." Dar learns the Sorceress fixed his staff, "The Ancient One wants me to observe human affairs...that disturb the balance of nature." Kim sabotages Nord equipment; captured for sacrifice, Dar frees him. Hearing the foreman's accusation, Arina arrests Dar, who calls her, "mercenary." Freeing Dar, Kim reunites with "little brother" Tao, revealing Maloc killed their parents. The people corner Maloc, who Kim kills on the altar. A so-called hero, Kim nevertheless sends hundreds of Xincans to finish Voden's road, needing its power to dispose of Voden as well. Dar shoves a dead deer at Kim, "This is what your road does." Kim, "keeping the peace," orders Nords to strap Dar to the altar. Tao and Arina free Dar. A Nord archer shoots at Tao; Kim dies blocking the arrow. Arina finally decides "what's worth fighting for," and standing against.
35	13	"Wild Child"	Brenton Spencer	Richard Oleksiak	February 10, 2001
Milos the Mad hunts wolves for pelts. Dar prevents Milos from shooting a snarling "wolf-boy," who bears a birthmark. Zad woos Huna, unsuccessfully, also wanting more crossbows, technology Nords lack. Taken by force, she reveals Milos "killed our chief." The wild child rejoins his wolf-mother. Khandor follows Huna sneaking away; she shoots first. Dar discovers Huna following, and being followed. The two quickly defeat three – Huna holds Milos, dagger-to-throat, unsafe "from this monster until he's dead." She wants Atticus. "The boy with the wolf...I think he's my son." She shows Dar her birthmark, revealing "He's the rightful heir to lead our tribe." Zad plots to capture Tao to engineer crossbows, and Atticus as "bargaining chip" to foil Dar. Finding the she-wolf, Huna reunites with Atticus, hiding him in the she-wolf's cave. Dar and Tao draw Milos away. Zad's warrior asks, "Shall we help them?" But Zad plans a trap. Dar picks off Milos' men in the mist. Zad negotiates, but Tao "won't do it." Zad threatens, "the boy dies." Dar allows only Milos to retrieve Atticus. The she-wolf leaps onto Milos, their cue to fight. Wolves join the fray. Huna misdirects Milos' crossbow, saving Atticus, and the she-wolf kills Milos.
36	14	"Mate for Life"	Ray Quint	Scott Kraft	February 17, 2001
Lyca and her lion Fale run from Navas, "You belong with us." Dar warns, "Let her go." Navas fights with speed and ferocity. Lyca runs, refusing to bear children and work for a husband she cannot choose. As tribal chief, Narvas' duty is to return her, or kill her. Dar agrees to accompany her beyond Narvas' territory. Zad's warriors capture Fale and Lyca. Raising Tao's crucible, Zad declares, "I need weapons....bring them!" Navas attacks, freeing Lyca. Tao tells Dar, "go after her!" Lyca describes her tribe, a pride of lion people, with one dominate male. Meanwhile, Tao forges Zad's metal sword. Zad demands a blade for everyone "who'll stand with me against Voden...Death to the Nords...open the wine!" Nearing freedom, Lyca doesn't want to lose Dar, transforming into a lion woman, which happens "when we feel passion or anger." Dar accepts, "You are what you are." With Zad and his warriors inebriated, Ruh protects Tao, who uses Dar's staff to free Fale and escape. On the cliff bridge, Navas persists "try to pass, I'll kill you both." Dar battles Navas, who slips, hanging over the gorge. "It's over...Let her go." Dar helps him up. Lyca, "I will be free."
37	15	"Centaurs"	Peter Andrikidis	Bill Gray	February 24, 2001
Suspecting horse thievery, Hjalmar attacks Dar and Tao. From horseback, Radia and Sagitto kill two Nords with arrows. Dar calms a Nord horse. Sagitto draws another arrow, "Turn him loose." Dar reads his thoughts, "Take him." Tao, "You communicated with him....but he's a man." Determining to discover more, Dar spies horses and riders blending into centaurs. Imagining a phalanx of invincible horse-borne archers, Voden sends Hjalmar to enlist them. Sagitto tells Dar and Tao, "Our land was a paradise, hidden from men's eyes." Radia, "We flourished in isolation, but..." Dar, "The ice age and the migration." Sagitto, "We were overrun." The Ancient One cautions the Sorceress, "Intervention is out of the question." Hjalmar drives their horses away. Radia and Sagitto reveal they will die without them. Voden's wrangler injures the mare's forelimb, crippling Radia. Sagitto, "We're...a single spirit in two bodies." The Sorceress, "They need our help." The Ancient One, "They need our attention. There is a difference." Infiltrating Xinca, Dar frees horses. The Nords witness Sagitto's centaur transformation. Voden, "I must have that creature." They return Radia's horse barely in time for her survival. Dar sends them away from Voden's forces, and communicates with Voden's mounts, who throw them.
38	16	"Fifth Element"	Karl Zwicky	Story by : Lars Guinard; Teleplay by : Tracy Forbes	March 3, 2001
Finding someone incased in stone, Dar advises, let him rest in peace. Tao's curiosity outweighs his wisdom. Anubis bursts outs, "I'm free," taking Dar's staff, "cringe in terror!" Tao, "Sorcery!" Anubis thrusts his magic rod at Tao, "learn obedience and respect, like my Cerberus...fear." Anubis stars a forest fire. Rescuing animals, Tao sniffs, finding a wolf; "he's changed me." Dar asks Iara, "call the waters." Fires doused, Anubis amplifies her "underwhelming" sprinkle into eroding torrents, drowning animals. Tao grows canines. The Ancient One reveals imprisoning Anubis for destroying creation. Iara offers to "shelter" Dar "beneath the waters." Dar deduces, without his rod's amenta, a symbol of his power, (Note: The "Amenta" on top of Anubis' magic rod in "Fifth Element" (season two, episode 16) is an Egyptian symbol of power.) they could stop Anubis, who calls tornadoes, mocking Dar for saving pathetic lives. Dar insists life has purpose. Anubis, "something to snuff out....The fourth and final element" – earthquakes. The Ancient One hints; Dar, "a fifth?" Tao, now Cerberus, warns Dar, who attacks Anubis. Cerberus attacks Dar, who "communicates" with Tao, learning the fifth element is "Life...made of the other four...We're the power that can defeat you....Life never cowers...it prevails." Cerberus disarms Anubis, reverting to Tao. The Ancient One takes the rod, and re-imprisons Anubis. Dar, "You're no match for the fifth element."
39	17	"A Terrible Silence"	Brenton Spencer	Tom Szollosi	April 14, 2001
Trailing a starving rogue tiger, Dar tires of Iara's "birds and bees" come-on, finally saying, "I'm not interested...leave me alone." Tao warns of women scorned. Dar saves Hjalmar from the tiger. Scorned, Iara uses Hjalmar's "deserved death" and "denying a hungry tiger" to punish Dar. "I take away your gift. You will no longer speak to those you love too little." Even the Ancient One feels balance being tipped, "You fool." Iara, "You are no longer the Beastmaster." Voden tortures a man to locate the elephants' graveyard for ivory to finance his wars. With even magic fading, threatening "the end of our world," the Ancient One concedes he must "interfere," tasking Dar, show your dedication, sacrifice, and word of honour to the animals. Dar rescues a water buffalo from quicksand, showing dedication. The tiger returns, still hunger-crazed. Dar recalls, "Curipira fed my body to the animals." Tao calls it suicide. Dar allows the tiger to maul him. The Ancient One heals Dar, "Your task of sacrifice is complete." Dar determines to "keep my promise" by feeding the tiger, leading it to a dead elephant. Dar's gift returns. "Seeking self-preservation," the Ancient One announces he is "leaving....to search for stronger magic."
40	18	"Birds"	Peter Andrikidis	Jim Henshaw	April 21, 2001
Rax raids birds' eggs. "Hungry hunter" Sinan has "fat pheasant." Rainbow lorikeets swarm, bloodying them. Sinan shoots, hitting Sharak; Dar removes his arrow. They find Bando dead, eyes pecked. Iara thinks someone wants her domain. Dar takes Sharak to bird healer Aviana, "grant me one of his feathers." Avianna fondles feathers "from almost every bird I've ever helped." Birds attack Rax and Sinan. Iara kills a hawk; the rest flee. Dar heard it apologize, it couldn't help himself. Dar declines to stay with Avianna, who tasks him, get a giant condor feather. Dozens of cassowaries hunt him. Weaving Sharak's feather into her icon, Avianna gains control, "Find the Beastmaster and kill him." Iara explains, "witches control their blackbird familiars" by entwining feathers. A condor feather controls the whole dominion. Attacking Dar, resisting Aviana, Sharak changes form, "I'm not an eagle. I'm a man." Aviana becomes enraged. Tao tells Aviana, birds "don't need an avenging angel." Aviana orders, kill all humans. Sharak reveals why the Ancient One cursed him. (Note: In "Birds," Sharak reveals to Dar that the Ancient One had taken the Sorceress into his service. Sharak tried to stop her, but the Ancient One wouldn't be denied, so he erased Sharak from her mind to keep her from "embracing emotions." She defied the Ancient One, who encased the Sorcerous in amber in the deepest cavern of his mountain, as seen in "Rage.") Sharak screeches; birds scatter. "Bird woman!" Iara attacks; Aviana escapes, struggles against Sharak, falling off the waterfall cliff. Tao tells Dar, "Pull Sharak's feather from the icon." Sharak flies away; Aviana doesn't.
41	19	"Mydoro"	Peter Andrikidis	Tony DiFranco	April 28, 2001
Waving his Eiron ring over the huaca (Xinca's obsidian mirrors), Solon enters the lost city of Mydoro, becoming trapped. Outside, students Loriel and Rikko flee poisonous lizards safeguarding "souls of the watchful dead." Nords capture Rikko and the Fire Crystal, which transforms Mydoro's healing crystal into a weapon, harnessing the power of the sun. Tao recounts the civil war to control the weapon. Dar rescues Loriel from Hjalmar. Solon is bitten, poisoned. Voden wants "the most powerful weapon," to fire the sun "like an arrow of...pure destruction." Rikko claims, "The sun crystal was destroyed on the Day of Catastrophe." The Sorceress multiplies Ruh's roars, delaying Voden. Lizards retreat at Dar's request. Tao, Loriel and Dar solve the puzzle of the Chamber of the Watchful Dead, entering the Chamber of the Sun. The Harmony of the Spheres heals Solon, who reveals it can also destroy. Tao suggests destroying Mydoro, to prevent another catastrophe. Solon finds the Mydorian library scroll describing the weapon. Dar, "If Voden finds this..." Solon, insists, that must never happen. Dar leads everyone back out. Solon stays, reversing the crystals to destroy Mydoro. Dar rescues Voden from the entrance collapsing. Solon sacrifices himself to thwart Voden's evil plans.
42	20	"Game of Death"	Pino Amenta	Bill Gray	May 5, 2001
Dagan, "The game is hard." Zad, but "just." Chalka's Queen Nyoka scoffs, "Just?" for men to die to pleasure a mob? She resists passing the death sentence. Zad wants the convicts for his army. Nyoka, "recruit elsewhere." Dagan feeds them to tigers. Nyoka's steward of the sacred tigers, Nomar, warns Ruh about Dagan's deer-bait. He orders Nomar killed. Dar removes Dagan's poisoned blow dart; Ruh recovers. Nomar tells Nyoka, "The tigers are unhappy. They wither away in despair, preferring death." Nyoka is "tired of reigning over so much death," even if Voden defeats Zad, targeting Chalka next. Dagan suggests, but Nyoka rejects, "you are my advisor, not my consort." He surreptitiously unlocks the cage, loosing a tiger on Nyoka. Dar saves her, but Dagan arrests him. Dar tells Nyoka, Dagan released the tiger, plotting for her crown. Barzo frames Tao as an assassin to gain Nyoka's trust and affection, revealing himself as Zad. Opposing Tao, Dar throws the tie-breaking stone away. Dagan demands both teams' executions. Nyoka countermands. Dagan pushes her, she calls guards, but he holds her at knife-point. Zad draws his sword. They struggle, and the tiger mauls Dagan. Zad escapes. Nyoka pronounces, "My tigers will go free."
43	21	"Regeneration"	Colin Budds	Bill Searle	May 12, 2001
The Apparition and Sentinels surround Arina and Dar, who defeat them and flee. Her power restricted outside the Burning Forest, the Apparition pleads with The Sorceress to help her "help Arina," who "carries the spawn of that evil," (after events in "Orpheo"). To "control its destiny," the Apparition threatens Dar so the Sorceress will "bend" the rules. In Xinca, Dar helps free Arina's brave Namib mare Cydia, which Voden bred "with his fastest stallion" starting his "great line of cavalry mounts." The Apparition assumes Dar's appearance, misleading Arina. The Sorceress realises, the Apparition was banished as the "harshest of evil." The Apparition explains, "Orpheo's child...sired by a dead man" will especially understand "dark ways" Learning as her apprentice, "its powers will surpass all others." But Arina would die to protect her child. They fight Sentinels to escape, but Hjalmar captures Arina. Overhearing Hjalmar's sedition, Voden plots, offering Arina's life for the mare. "No...I can never trust you." Voden pits Hjalmar against Arina, who defeats him, offering "My life for...your general's." Voden gestures, thumb down, but Arina spares Hjalmar. Dar frees Arina. Hjalmar allows their escape. The Sorceress nullifies the Apparition's flame-breath, saving Dar. Meanwhile, Tao helps deliver Cydia's foal.
44	22	"Clash of the Titans"	Pino Amenta	David Barlow	May 19, 2001
Zad's warriors capture elephants "to break down the walls of Xinca," threatening slaughter if Dar will not calm them. Distracting, Tao is captured helping Dar escape. Tracking Zad, Arina finds Hjalmar, whose men capture her for Voden, who schedules an execution to leverage Dar against Zad's elephants. Dar asks the Sorceress to help Tao, but "I've learned the cost of interference. Without my teacher here, I can't afford to create consequences I can't overturn." Dar tries the tunnels, but Voden "found that trap door." Displeased to see elephants hurt, the Sorceress warns Zad about Voden's "powerful arrows" that pierce hide. Donning Nord garb, Dar rescues Arina. The Sorceress calls fog, terrifying Voden, and hiding elephants smashing through. Voden's and Zad's forces clash. Dar and Arina search for Tao, riding the elephants to his location. Voden orders a counterattack; Hjalmar refuses, having "made a pact with Zad...an evil I can understand, and not a complete madman." Voden flees. Zad sounds the victory signal to end Tao's life. Dar, Arina and the elephants save him. Zad kills Hjalmar, ordering his Nords, "find me Voden or follow your general to your deaths." Voden escapes, cowering alone in the rainforest.

=== Season 3 (2001–02) ===
No. overall	No. in season	Title	Directed by	Written by	Original release date
45	1	"The Legend Reborn"	Richard Franklin & Ian Thorburn	George Geiger	October 1, 2001
Demanding road tax, Zad's knight Kelb stabs Erial's father Majar. Dartanus challenges Dar to "see what you have learned." Spirit warrior lightning flashes from rune-marked hands signifying "Your past and your future....you are not who you think you are." Tao translates pre-Xincan king's court temple glyphs – "Destiny" and "Deliverance." "King of Xinca only," Zad demands "dreams...auguries...prophecies...prognostications" from soothsayer Slythius. The Ancient One's ashy corpse crumbles. Zad demands payment of Balcifer's dark-side bargain – the world, eternal life, and the Sorceress – however, "Your work is not done." Zad cracks the amber-encased prison, releasing the Sorceress (after events in "Rage"). Now free to help however she pleases, she visits Dar's dream. Tao interprets four elemental symbols – "omens when the land turns to chaos." Dartanus directs them to Slythius, who saw Dar "with steel in your hand and Zad's blood on it." The Sorceress urges, fight for what you want, warning Dar about "dark mysteries...deep magic." Dartanus reveals, Dar's bone staff magically transforms into the steel sword of his real father, Eldar, King of Arakann, whom Balcifer helped Zad defeat. Dar sees his Queen birth-mother, before adoptive Sulas protected against Balcifer's "realm of darkness." (Note: In a "twist of time," the spirit warrior Dartanus reveals that he was with Eldar, King of Arakann, the day he was slain, as shown in a flashback scene from "The Legend Reborn" where King Eldar (credited to Colin Handley) lays dead, next to his Queen (credited to Sue Mulcahy), Dar's unnamed mother, holding in her arms baby Dar, who was "born a few days before Zad's armies attacked the kingdom and Zad's spear found your father's heart.") Attacking Dimor, Zad bleeds red from Dar's sword, freeing Tao.
46	2	"The Crystal Ark"	Colin Budds	Charles Lazer	October 8, 2001
Zad's knights are destroying relics of King Eldar's reign. Rhana and Breon split an ancient tablet of "eternal truth" for safekeeping. Breon hides his from Kelb, but Slythius takes Rhana's, threatening torture. She reveals its red clay indicates Eldar's eastern Red Desert Temple. Zad's knights kill Breon, who tells Dar where his half is. They fight knights to retrieve and translate it. Dar's ferret finds a clue; black ice, indicating the Red Desert. After a hidden forest path, Frolo's men escort them to the "storehouse of knowledge" where Zad's forces are destroying everything. Dar rescues Rhana and her tablet half from Zad. Tao translates, the last sun rays behind the mountain will show the way. In the rocky underground, Dar finds the Crystal Ark – "to keep those things that are beyond value," etched with wolf, goat, and other animal runes. Dartanus explains, "more than just animals." Eldar knew to hide his whole family from the evil Balcifer, changing them into animals, until Dar could find and restore them to their rightful place, bringing them to the ark where they will be safe. Their powers will be released, and they will regain their human form to help Dar defeat Balcifer.
47	3	"Chosen One"	Colin Budds	David Tynan	October 15, 2001
Avoiding a death trap, Tao discovers an underground altar with five glowing finger points representing Dar's five missing kinsmen. A book prophecies the Chosen One, "a king who returns...to dispel darkness," and a family member "beyond the Land of the Mist." Slythius discovers their destination. Dar crosses the mist, stranding Arina and Tao atop the cliff. Ruh follows Dar. While Arina fights Zad's knights, Tao follows Ruh, but drops the book which Slythius finds. Saving Morah from a boar, Dar enters her village. Morah's father Kumon, Chief of the Tosa, declares, "You are The One. Our God!" Kumon intends to test Dar, revealing "the sacred one," a tropical bird that appeared twenty years ago. His sigil flaring, Dar recognizes the bird houses his mother's spirit. Morah doses Dar with nectar for a "purifying" ritual to save them from the Gorman "demon." While preventing Morah's sacrifice, Dar's cut bleeds, disproving his "godhood." Kumon binds Dar and Tao, intending to sacrifice the bird instead. Kodo frees Dar, who battles the Gorman, now revealed as a cyclops. Freeing his mother to fly away, Dar kills the Gorman with his staff-sword. Having triggered the death trap on Slythius, Arina returns the book to Tao.
48	4	"Veil of Death"	Richard Franklin	David Barlow	October 22, 2001
Hunters collect Zad's bounty for big cats, but Slythius knows the leopard "isn't the right one." Dar prevents them hunting a white tiger; his rune flaring, he sees a woman's spirit within. From an old man's blood, Slythius divines, "the white tiger shares the Beastmaster's blood." Zad sends Kelb's men, who kill her with a poisoned crossbow bolt. Orpheo demands, "my right. I'm here to guide this one to the Realm of the Dead." Zad kills Kelb's nephew for not proving the tiger's death. Dar determines to bring her spirit back. The Sorceress helps him enter the Realm of the Dead with a potion, "Drink it and you're one breath away from death." Slythius divines Dar's intention. Zad sends men to destroy the tiger's body so "the dead stays dead." Dar finds the woman's spirit – his sister Lycia. Trying to revive Dar prematurely, Tao struggles with the Sorceress and the antidote is destroyed. He hurries to gather replacement ingredients. Zad finds the tiger's body; intending to burn it, they build a pyre. Dar battles Orpheo to escape. Zad lights the pyre. Tao completes the antidote, reviving Dar. Now restored to the tiger's body, Dar leads Lycia into the Crystal Ark.
49	5	"The Prize"	Colin Budds	Phil Bedard & Larry LaLonde	October 29, 2001
J'Sandra warns Tao, Rogan barbarians will destroy Kwaiza. The Apparition attacks them, "no longer a prisoner of the old forest." The Sorceress challenges her. Dar tells Tao's teacher, Chief Chiuma, they must learn to defend themselves. Consulted, Balcifer tells the Apparition and Sorceress, "Who will serve me best will corrupt this goodness at its source," meaning Dar. Arina helps train villagers to fight. The Sorceress entices Dar, promising help to find his family if he leaves Kwaiza. Dar rebuffs Rogan chief Gannuk, who leaves, promising to return. The Apparition duplicates Gannuk's forces to drive Dar from Kawiza. Seeing through her illusion, Dar repels them. Unable to communicate with animals, the Sorceress makes Dar's ferrets human to discover what Dar values most; "his friends." But Kodo-Woman and Podo-Man help defend Kwaiza from Rogans. The Apparition abducts Tao to lure Dar away, threatening to burn him in a tree. The Sorceress reveals their contest to Dar, "The winner will become Balcifer's emissary on earth." Sharak "says he'll make you a prisoner," but, "there's goodness in you." Convinced to help, she deceives the Apparition that Dar left Kwaiza, while Arina, Kodo and Podo rescue Tao. Having failed, Balcifer strips the Apparition's power.
50	6	"Tiger, Tiger..."	Michael Pattinson	James Thorpe	November 5, 2001
Niqit demonstrates dagger marksmanship on a bound woman. Zad tasks Niqit to bring Ruh alive to Zad's sister Callista. (Note: Mel Rogan as Callista (3 episodes)) Baiting his cub, Ruh is wounded; Dar empathises. Callista intends to sacrifice Ruh as an augury to find Dar's remaining family for Zad. Dar recalls "Zad's fighting pit...where I first met Ruh." Dartanus says, Ruh is in Xinca. Callista entices Kelb, Captain of Xinca, to reveal Zad's activities. Dar infiltrates Zad's dungeons, finding Ruh, but Callista incapacitates him. While Dartanus defeats opposing guards, Tao enters the dungeon to rescue Dar. Callista conspires with Kelb, "Balcifer won't need both brother and sister. One...will become expendable." Kelb claims allegiance, "Long live the Queen." Tao provides Ruh healing herbs and unlocks Dar's bonds. Callista interdicts Dar's escape. Zad forces Dar into his arena against five Terron knights. Kelb reveals Callista's coup d'état, but knowing Kelb's hatred, Zad preemptively kills Kelb. Dartanus interrupts Callista's sacrifice, freeing Ruh. Dar defeats the last of Zad's five knights. (Note: Brad McMurray as Knight #1 (2 episodes)) Niqit wounds Dar. Zad attacks, but Dartanus returns Dar's staff-sword, which he uses against Zad. Dartanus reveals he fought Zad previously (in "The Legend Continues"), and Dar's rescue of Ruh was "a test you needed to pass."
51	7	"Slayer's Return"	Catherine Millar	George Geiger	November 12, 2001
Nagha prays Zuraya "will join with King Rolan and become the vessel of our rebirth...an heir to the Kingdom of Tira." Zuraya's wolf Slayer snarls, and escapes. A woman screams, her throat bitten. Rolan's royal hunter wounds Slayer, which Dar feels. Tao remains in Arakann. Zuraya rides out with Dar to search. Battling hunters, they find Slayer, who houses Dar's brother's spirit. Rolan admits, "I gave the order." Dar deduces, "the arrow was poisoned." Rolan supplies beautiful women to distract Dar, and locks him away from Zuraya's "purification ritual." Nagha explains, "An ancient evil spirit stalks our village by night." Kodo and Podo scout Dar's escape. He finds Zuraya drinking Nagha's "tonic," observes Rolan's ancient monstrous reflection, and overhears Nagha's plan for Rolan's spirit to inhabit Zuraya's child, whose birth she cannot survive. Dar finds Tao to heal Slayer, but fails to convince Zuraya to leave Rolan, whose guards take him to Nagha for execution. Dar's sword fights her grasp. Sharak helps Dar escape to interrupt the wedding ceremony, while Tao cures Slayer. Zuraya resists, knocking Nagha out, while Dar battles Rolan, who flees; Slayer mauls him, revealing Rolan's true face to Zuraya. Dar leads Slayer into the Crystal Ark.
52	8	"Destiny"	Marc Singer	Tony Di Franco	November 19, 2001
At a travelling circus, trick rider Niva performs atop Simtar. Bolak steals her stallion as "breeding stock" for Zad's "new war horses." "In moonlight you fight in Xinca, for captured is your quest. But in the sun you fall, your sword pierced through your breast. My shadows never lie. In Xinca, by your own sword, you die." — Olana, the crone In ryhme, the fortune-teller crone Olana prophecies Dar's death. Dar battles Zad's knights, freeing Niva. Puppeteer Pola performs, pitting Zad against Dar, who wins. For bardic tales, Dar pairs Pola with Tao. Slythius augurs, "A natural king will ride this steed, and if he stays the course, he'll be carried to victory." Dar follows Niva to free Simtar, who Zad, having failed mounting, orders killed. Dar intervenes. Zad captures Niva to break Simtar. Sharak and Ruh herd horses; Tao and Pola replace Simtar. Slythius threatens harm to Niva's sister Pola if she cannot locate Dar, who knocks Slythius out. Pola assures Tao, makeup will fool Zad. Pola's Zad-puppet triumphs over Dar-puppet. Niva produces faux-Simtar, which Zad mounts. Slythius protests, "This is not the horse." Dar distracts Zad by swordplay "slaying" Dar-double, while Niva escapes with Simtar. Dar leads Simtar, who houses his other brother's spirit, into the Crytal Ark.
53	9	"Serpent's Kiss"	Colin Budds	Rick Drew	November 26, 2001
The succubus Nadeea allies with Zad against Dar. The ghost of Arina's grandfather appears, as "dark forces opened the graves" of her ancestors. Through a Namib ritual, Arina must "gather their souls...to their sacred resting place." Captured by Nadeea, Tao is tortured for the Crystal Ark. Slythius divines Nadeea can only steal souls when asked for help. Dar and Arina free Tao; Nadeea, still undiscovered, accompanies. Zad allows their escape. Arina gathers sacred mud protected by the swamp Rotan. Meanwhile, Nadeea seduces Tao, inhaling his lifeforce, assuming control. Separated for remaining items, and tricked into asking for help, Nadeea sucks Arina soul, enslaving her. Zad's forces enter the Namib graveyard, where Tao attacks Dar, who induces sleep via chokehold, but Arina incapacitates Dar. Nadeea gloats, revealing her phylactery containing their souls. Zad tasks Dar to gather Namib souls for Nadeea to present to Balcifer. When Dar refuses, Nadeea orders Arina to kill Tao. Dar performs the ritual, using a key phrase Arina taught him to "help me defeat those who defile your sacred resting place." The spirits attack, while Sharak snatches Nadeea's phylactery belt. The spirits force Nadeea into the netherworld. Dar restores Tao and Arina's souls.
54	10	"Dispossessed"	Michael Pattinson	Stacey Kaser	January 14, 2002
Zad offers gold for animal skins and timber, killing a mother monkey. Orla princess Alima mistakenly attacks Dar, rescuing its baby. Dar wants to stop Alima's brother Mikka, and other disillusioned greedy Orlas, performing trader Lokar's logging. Tao reminds, they search for his mother's spirit, housed in the tropical Golden Auryx bird. Alima advises, Lokar's path will destroy their nests. Reasoning with Mikka fails. With Zad's knights approaching, and Tao alerting Dar, they leave. Dar finds his mother, warning her, fly away from an archer. At Lokar's return, Mikka resumes work. Dar intervenes, but he's outnumbered; Lokar intends to ransom him to Zad, holding him, Alima and Tao prisoner. Tao's herbs induce symptoms, drawing guards to effectively escape. Mikka helps knock out a knight so he can escape. Sharak finds the Orla a new home beyond the treacherous Kunja bog. Kodo, Podo, Dar and Mikka save Alima from sinking. Lokar captures Tao. Knights hunt Dar, but "We've got the forest and bog and my friends." The bog swallows two knights. Lokar bargains – Tao for the Auryx. Dar lures Lokar into a trap for Ruh. Alima guides Dar to an Auryx nest, but Dar must wait another year for their migration.
55	11	"Turning Point"	Colin Budds	Charles Lazer	January 21, 2002
Zad's knights attack, but Dar's intent is finding his third brother's spirit within a goat. Arina senses a trap. Dar battles the lead knight. Arina falls off a waterfall cliff. Dar dives, believing her death his fault. Tao reasons chance; retrospectively, how often did they save each other? Dar recalls meeting (while encountering "Manlinks"), rescues during a "Clash of the Titans," struggling against "Orpheo" and countering darkness with the "Fifth Element." But Dar despairs, "I am ready to quit" after deaths like Kyra's (in "Revelations"). Tao admonishes, make their deaths meaningful, maintaining courage after defeating "Gemini" twins, Qord's Terrons ("The Golden Phoenix"), Akili's "Obsession," battling "demons and their warriors" ("The Umpatra"), saving the "Wild Child" and other children like "The Chameleon," and total strangers, even "Centaurs." Tao, "If you're going to walk away now, why did you bother to save my life" in "Xinca?" Dar asks, why is it "my destiny to save them all?" Tao counters, why else suffer pain to gain animal powers from "The Demon Curupira?" Dar realizes, Curupira's promise was to Eldar, not his Sula father. Tao agrees, Eldar provided the chance to defeat Balcifer. "This is your destiny, Dar." Resuming their search, they find Arina.
56	12	"The Hunter"	Mark Piper	Peter Lauterman	January 28, 2002
With the Ancient One slain, the Sorceress tries restoring Sharak's human form – "take the imprisoned one and set him free." Instead, she releases King Nolos the Terrible's evil spirit from Balmagesh, the ancient city underneath Xinca. In fog form, he chases a woman, feeding on her fear. With eleven citizens dead, Caro sends for Tao. Wanting a scapegoat, Zad orders Bolak to arrest Dar, ordering the Sorceress to determine the cause. Dar arrives too late to save a couple. Dar defeats knights, who also die. Because Dar did not run, he lives. The Sorceress informs Zad. Citizens rise up against the Sorceress. Zad lies, claiming the Beastmaster is responsible. Tao surmises they must destroy Nolos' tomb. The mob drives Dar into Zad's knights, who he battles before the fog kills them, sparing only Dar and Zad, who asks Dar for help. Tao finds a gate into Balmagesh; Caro follows. Zad and Dar track Tao into the undercity. Tao and Caro hide from the fog, finding Nolos' tomb. Dar finds Tao separated from Caro, who Zad finds and tries to feed to the fog. Still breathing, Tao revives her. The Sorceress transmutes Nolos; made corporeal, Zad flees, but Dar slays Nolos.
57	13	"Turned to Stone"	Chris Martin-Jones	Sarah Dodd	February 4, 2002
Beach tribesmen chase Arina. Ruh scares them away. Dar's rune flares, seeing his third brother, the goat. Arina leads him toward Arakann. Elka protests, "This will destroy our village." The demon Yamira gazes, turning Elka to stone. The Sorceress interrupts, revealing Yamira's jealousy over Sharak, for whom she will give her powers to Yamira if Dar fails three tasks. 1) "Bring me a pear from the tree of golden fruit," in the Forest of Secrets. Podo finds it in an invisible tree. A guardian attacks. Namira petrifies Dar's sword-arm. The Sorceress protests her cheating, healing Dar. 2) "Bring me a piece of the sky." The Sorceress hints; Dar, "falling stars." Sharak spies the meteorite. Her powers waning, the Sorceress prevents Yamira petrifying Sharak. 3) Defeat the Dengen (muscular, trident-wielding, gilled-merman). Yamira binds the Sorceress. Meanwhile, for the goat, Yamira sent tribesmen, who capture Arina via blow dart. Yamira increases the stakes. Ruh scares Arina's guards; the goat chews her bonds. Dar defeats the Dengen. Yamira reneges, petrifying Arina. The Sorceress warns Dar not to look into Yamira's eyes. Seeing through Sharak, Dar reflects Yamira's gaze back with his sword, petrifying Yamira, which frees everyone. The goat enters the Crystal Ark.
58	14	"The Choice"	Steven Grives	David Tynan	February 11, 2002
Callista's warrior women find the Crystal Ark, which Dar relinquishes to save Tao. Balcifer speaks through Kama, "Eldar's line still lives." He orders the animals released from the Ark, since he cannot break it. To restore her lover Sharak, the Sorceress implores, remove "your ex-curse." (Note: In "The Choice" it is revealed that it was Balicer who killed the Ancient One (as seen in "The Legend Reborn").) Balcifer demands, "The Beastmaster must let Sharak go." Callista traps Tao and Dar in a spider web. While Ruh distracts, Dar cuts them loose. Since the Sorceress cannot release the animals, she sends Callista inside the Ark. Dar willingly allows Sharak to choose human form. The Sorceress reveals Callista's camp, now abandoned. Dar finds the Ark, but Callista removed the animals as transmuted figurines. She restores the goat for sacrifice. Asking about the Ark, Sharak learns the Sorceress' scheme. "You've given the world to Balcifer....at what price?" He leaves her to help Dar, who deflects Callista's sacrificial dagger. Warriors fight Dar and Tao, while Sharak prevents Callista's second attempt. Callista sacrifices her warrior instead, entrapping the wolf, tiger, and horse in the cliff-face. Sharak shouts for the Sorceress, who brings the Ark. Sharak sacrifices his humanity, becoming an eagle forever, in order to return the animals to the Ark. However, the goat has wandered away.
59	15	"Sisters"	Brendan Maher	Gillian Horvath	February 18, 2002
Spying beautiful women, coveting one's bracelet, Tarbok attacks; the others feel her pain. Dar intervenes. Slythius, recognizing her bracelet, enlists Kerik, who silences Tarbok. Asking the scholarly Tao to teach them, they enter their cloister. For Ultrum's map, Slythius sends Kerik to "The Sisters of Vella. A sacred order." Ilira spots Dar; Queen Vella instructs, "I must have what he knows." Tao inquires about Ultrum, Eldar's soothsayer. Kerik attacks a sister, alerting all others. Dar arrives, but Kerik kills her and escapes. Tao finds their inner sanctum, and Ultrum's map that magically tracks locations of Dar's family. "You must teach us." A sister's fingernail stinger incapacitates Tao, who sees Ultrum's corpse, drained of knowledge by Vella. Practicing swordplay, a sister learns Kerik's techniques. Brandishing stingers, the sisters block Dar, using Kerik's combat skills. Kerik demands Ultrum's map; Sister, "We never tell our secrets." The sisters relent; Dar finds Tao catatonic, demanding Vella restore him. Dar prevents her trying to sting. "Let him go, and learn from me instead." Upon seeing his world, she restores Tao. Learning Eldar was Dar's father, she offers the map, which Kerik already took. Ruh prevents his escape. Dar defeats him. Vella wipes Kerik's memory.
60	16	"The Alliance"	Chris Martin-Jones	Edwina Follows	February 25, 2002
Ultrum's map shows the goat on an active volcano. Talia's falcon Rapdus hunts, snatching Kodo. Dar calls Sharak to follow, but Talia's men attack, binding them. Learning Dar's father is Eldar, Galen smiles, "My father King Astarte was his closest friend. Welcome, cousin." But Talia derides Dar's "pets." Galen presents an arranged marriage agreement to unite against darkness, claiming, "the greatest army in the land. Marry my sister and it's yours." Talia, "I'll never marry him." Galen tells his assassin, once "my sister is queen, I will slay Dar and wear the crown myself." Dar agrees to wed Talia after he finds his brother. Arina spares with Galen's man, who accidentally spears Galen, who remains unharmed. Endangering herself on the volcano, Dar saves Talia, bonding over the experience, and applying healing ointment. Suspecting Galen of dark magic, Arina interrupts Tao describing the Ark. Defeating his assassin, Arina confronts Galen, who admits, "Balcifer made me invincible." Tao discovers "Galen died in battle." They interrupt Dar kissing Talia, who confronts Galen. Dar defends her, and they battle. Dar destroys Galen's gauntlet, piercing his arm, which also harms Talia. Galen gains an advantage, forcing Talia to kill Galen, knowing she too will die.
61	17	"The Trial"	Ian Thorburn	Sarah Dodd	April 8, 2002
Dar battles Zad's hunters, saving Arina first, as a cornered puma fears a hurled spear, which magically reverses mid-flight, piercing Zad's knight. The forest demon Manaka accuses Dar of betrayal, "For failing to protect Curupira's animals, you will stand trial." Arina suggests Manaka's sister Curupira preside, but she was "trapped underwater by Iara," (in "White Tiger"). Manaka reminds, Dar failed before (retrospectively flashing back to "The Last Unicorns" and "The Demon Curupira"). Manaka rules "Guilty...I banish you to the eternal Darklands." Tao, "You're only telling half the story." What about those he saved (from "The Umpatra"), even without communication powers ("A Terrible Silence"), and when others would have run ("Clash of the Titans")? Arina protests only Dar can defeat Balcifer. Tao adds, "We haven't heard the animals speak." Ruh recalls Dar saving a lion cub ("Heart Like a Lion"), his own tiger cub ("Tiger, Tiger..."), and helping his mother Tiala ("Ghosts of the Forest"). Arina admits hunting, before realizing, "Dar would give his life for any of his friends, animal or human." Unmoved, Manaka rules; Sharak, Kodo, Podo, Ruh, and the puma join Dar for banishment. Manaka concedes, "Only a true Beastmaster would draw such loyalty even from the puma."
62	18	"The Devil You Know"	Brendan Maher	Tony Di Franco	April 15, 2002
Dar finds the goat, his brother Sendar, fleeing straight for Callista, whose acolytes, Kama, Zad and knights surround Dar. Callista binds Dar to Zad with Balcifer's enchanted chain, and restores Sendar's humanity. Acolytes push Dar and Zad off a cliff; a root snags their chain. Dar's ferrets maneuver hanging vines, saving them. Although Dar is Eldar's heir, Callista seduces firstborn Sendar into claiming Eldar's crown. Kama spies Zad and Dar, but Arina returns Dar's sword and they flee. Captured, Tao finds Sendar has rejected Dar. Callista asks Sendar about Tao; "Kill him." Dar's sword breaks Balcifer's chain. Zad grabs Callista, "Get away from my throne." Sendar flees; Dar follows. Arina saves Tao from execution. Zad wrests control of Xinca's forces from Callista. Dar tries reasoning, but Sendar draws a dagger, "The throne is mine." Dar, "That's Callista speaking, not you....it's not about us...it's about the fate of the world and our destiny." Fleeing again, Callista convinces Sendar to wait for her and another chance, inside the Ark. Zad threatens to kill the goat. Dar, Tao and Arina hold blades to Zad, and leave with Sendar. Zad throws Callista into boiling tar. Dar sends Sendar into the Ark.
63	19	"Double Edged"	Colin Budds	Edwina Follows	April 22, 2002
Against Arina's warning, Dar releases bound men. A masked assailant attacks, evades via treetops, and steals Dar's sword. Arina reminds, Dartanus said only Eldar's sword can defeat Balcifer. Bianna knocks out a knight to give Zad "a gift," attacking. Zad takes Dar's sword. Threatened with branding, Bianna reveals "You killed my mother," Terrons burned Skandar, where Eldar's sword was forged. Arina diverts attention. Dar offers exchanging himself. Attacking, Eldar's sword disobeys Zad. Dar frees Bianna, escaping. Zad catches Arina searching for it. Informed by Bianna, Tao reasons Zad wants one forged for evil. Zad demands the Skandar swordmaker. Nessis is "sworn to secrecy." Threatened, a villager claims, "I forged the sword," a second, "No, I did," and so on. Zad threatens to kill everyone. Arnath admits, "I am the one." Nessis tells his granddaughter Bianna, Zad took her father Arnath to "The sacred forge. The fires of Raymor." Given no choice, Arnath forges another in the crucible of Eldar's sword. Balcifer instructs, temper it "in the blood of a hero." Zad eyes Arina, "a heroine." Intervening, Arnath returns Dar's sword. Zad kills Arnath, "The Sword of Balcifer is complete." Bianna frees Arina. Zad invokes, "Balcifer!" whose earthquake allows Zad's escape.
64	20	"Rites of Passage"	Pino Amenta	Sarah Dodd	April 29, 2002
Tao and Arina divide and conquer knights, isolating Zad, who Dar defeats. Dartanus rolls a boulder. Dar saves Zad, who throws Dar down. Awaking, Eldar's sword gone, a beautiful young woman serves Dar at Zad's palace. Dartanus, "a cage" you made saving Zad. Xinca knights salute. Sharak is magically caged. Citizens love Beastmaster arena shows. Eldar rebels call Dar, "Traitor!" Arina, "Zad won." Tao spits; people suffered after Dar saved Zad. Arina attacks, breaking Sharak's cage; Dar incapacitates her. Retrieving Ultrum's map, he finds his mother. Arina captures Ruh. Zad says, choose "Auryx, tiger?" Refusing, Dar tries saving Ruh, who knights kill; Zad gets the bird. Dartanus chastises, enemies exploit weakness. War requires hard choices, sacrifice. Losing faith, Sharak leaves. Arakann is destroyed. Rhana assures, their leader will welcome him. A rebel scoffs. Tao, "Today, we storm Xinca!" But Tao is slain. Dartanus presents Tao's killer. Dar, "I don't kill." Dartanus, "destroy your enemies!" Dar, "That's what Balcifer wants." Protecting against Dartanus, Dar frees the killer. "You've passed the final test...trust your instincts. Stay true to your convictions. Would you still save Zad?" He returns Dar to the boulder; this time, Dar knocks Zad unconscious, leaving to find his mother.
65	21	"End Game"	Colin Budds	David Tynan	May 6, 2002
Dar captures the Golden Auryx. Zad's men attack, then demons. Arina kills a demon; Balcifer possesses her. Dar slays another. Dartanus warns, "Trust no one." Tao interprets runes. Balcifer-Arina conspires with Zad. Dar's mother advises, use Eldar's strength and the Ark's power against Balcifer. "Or the final challenge is lost." Zad's knights attack. Balcifer-Arina steals and teleports the Auryx. Dar cannot kill Arina, but Dartanus would. Dar holds Eldar's sword against her, exorcising Balcifer. Dar takes the Ark to Xinca. Confronting Balcifer, Dartanus is defeated and assigned a task. Balcifer-Tao incapacitates Arina. Zad trails Dar to steal the Ark. Balcifer leaves Tao, who Zad incapacitates. Dar finds the Auryx, but Balcifer makes an offer. Dartanus reminds Dar, "faith." Having both the Ark and Auryx, Balcifer claims, "Your death isn't what I'm after." Dar, "You need me to abandon my quest. Betray everything I believe in." Dartanus reminds, "faith." Dar, "I can still win." Dartanus frees Tao and Arina to help get Dar's mother into the Ark. Dar battles Balcifer. Arina battles Zad. Tao retrieves the Auryx. Dartanus saves Dar from Balcifer. Dar guides the Auryx into the Ark. The Ark empowers Eldar's sword to banish Balcifer, "Gone but not beaten."
66	22	"A New Dawn"	Pino Amenta	Charles Lazer	May 13, 2002
Zad's men keep coming for the Ark. Slythius foretells Balcifer will destroy Zad soon, if he fails. An impending permanent eclipse threatens eternal darkness, heralding Balcifer's reign on earth, unless Dar finds the key to unlock the Ark. Balcifer orders Zad, "Open the Crystal Ark," before Dar can. Dar searches Eldar's and Balcifer's battlefield in vain. In Arakann, Arina protects the Ark against Zad's forces, who cannot locate it. But Zad knows how to find it. Dartanus guides Dar to Eldar's secret burial place, hidden behind twenty-five years of jungle growth. Kodo and Podo find the door, but Zad already vandalized it. Guardians surround them. Recognizing Dar's sword, Meer-ahn bows. She presents Eldar's crown. Ferrets find Eldar's "jeweled ring with your father's symbol on it." Zad steals it. Balicfer manifests, berating Zad, who flees, falling into a fiery pit. Balicfer offers Zad's throne; Dar, "Not interested...Fighting to save the world...It's my father's legacy." With the ring, Balicfer teleports. They rush back to the Ark. Dartanus is waiting for Balicfer, who defeats him again. Dar saves Dartanus, defeats Balicfer, and opens the Ark with the ring as the eclipse completes. Series epilogue: A new dawn shines as Dar's family returns to human form. Tao and Arina remain to care for their world and guard the Ark, which now imprisons Balcifer. Sharak and Ruh accompany Dar to his kingdom, which Dartanus reveals, to reunite with his family.
