= The Finder (film) =

- Genre: mystery thriller
- Written by: Phillip Avalon
- Directed by: Frank Shields
- Starring: Paul Mercurio; Simon Westaway
- Theme music composer: Aftamine (Band). Rob Ratjens (Lead Vocals) Michelle Perram (Guitar) Matt Findlay (Guitar) Ellen Marsh (Bass) Lance Findlay (Drums)
- Composer: Ian Cameron Smith
- Country of origin: Australia
- Original language: English

Production
- Executive producers: Mikael Borglund; Gary Hamilton
- Producer: Phillip Avalon
- Cinematography: Andrew Robertson
- Editor: David Stiven
- Running time: 92 minutes
- Production companies: Avalon Films; Intertropic Films
- Budget: $650,000

Original release
- Release: 18 July 2001

The Finder is a 2001 Australian mystery-thriller film.

== Cast ==
- Paul Mercurio as Leo Natoli
- Simon Westaway as Les Kearney
- Anja Coleby as Rebecca Castaldi
- Alan Lovell as Ace Mulroney
- Allison Cratchley as Michelle Reed
- Dieter Brummer as Rick Davidson
- Rowena Wallace as Irene Davidson
- Rob Carlton as Wheels
- Gerard Maguire as Sgt Jack Matthews
- Vic Rooney as Jim Davidson
- Callan Mulvey as Sam Natoli
- Caz Lederman as Judy Wheelen
- Barry Langrishe as Bob Castaldi
- Lani Tupu as Lyle Riskin

== Plot ==
Les Kearney (Simon Westaway) is an ex-cop who specialises in finding missing persons. When he is hired to locate the kidnapped daughter (Anja Coleby) of construction tycoon Bob Castaldi (Barry Langrishe), he encounters numerous murder suspects along the way, as the deadline looms.

== Production ==
The film was an idea of producer-writer Phil Avalon's. It was shot in 2000 with privately raised finance.

== Reception ==
The film was finished by December 2000. It was sold to Israel, China, Russia and the CIR and was screened at the American Film Market in February 2001. It had a one off screening at Avalon's own bar in Sydney before being released on DVD.

The critic for Screen Daily said that:

Unable to unlock the potential of their sun/surf/sleuth concept, Avalon and veteran director Frank Shields instead deliver a compendium of overfamiliar situations, characters and dialogue, with an occasional ill-judged sequence of 'comic relief'. A committed bunch of talented actors do their best to energise an otherwise limp affair whose true home may well prove to be off-peak cable television.

== See also ==
- Cinema of Australia
