= Brooke Harman =

Australian actress

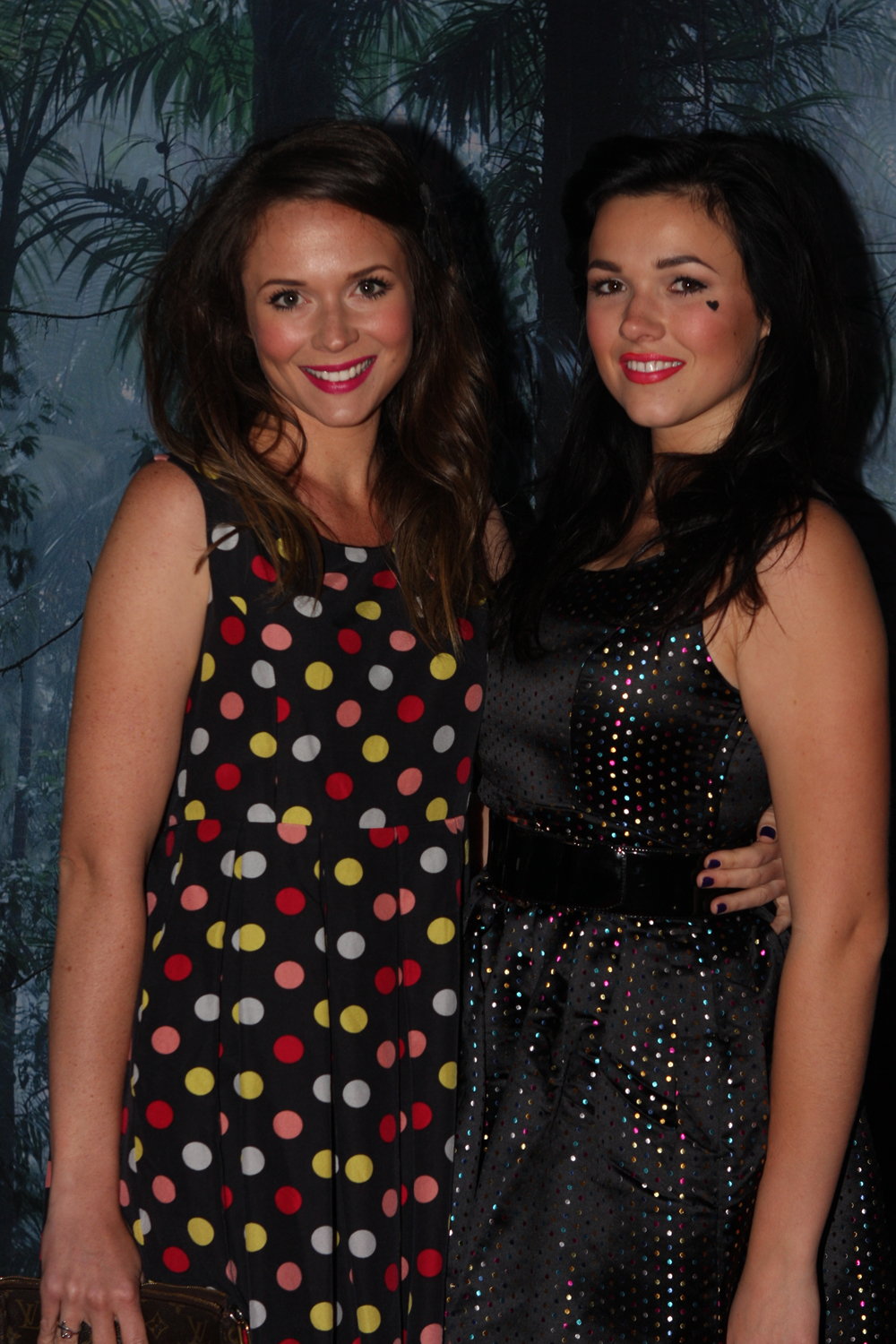
- Harman (L) and Demi Harman on a red carpet (2012)
- Born: Orange County, California, U.S.
- Occupation: Actress
- Years active: 1996–2015
- Spouse: Jeffrey Walker (2006–present)
- Relatives: Demi Harman (sister)

Brooke Harman-Walker is an American-born former Australian actress.

== Biography ==
Born in Orange County, California and moving to Brisbane, Queensland as a young child, her first television role was at age eleven on the children's television series The Wayne Manifesto. She has since guest starred on a number of television programs including Home and Away, All Saints, White Collar Blue, Beastmaster, Flipper, The Sleepover Club, and appeared in the 2003 film Ned Kelly. Harman played the feature role of Silvy Lewis in the Paramount motion picture Till Human Voices Wake Us with Guy Pearce and Helena Bonham Carter. Brooke also starred in the children's television program Pirate Islands, and became a permanent cast member of The Secret Life of Us in the year before the show's cancellation. She played the role of Kate Monk on the short-lived Australian drama headLand.

Her surname is sometimes credited as Harmon (or more rarely, Harmen).

== Personal life ==
Brooke has been married since 2006 to Australian actor and director Jeffrey Walker. Together they have three children, sons, Boston Scott Walker (b. 24 June 2013), Ace Jackson Walker (b. 24 June 2015) and Leo Walker (b. 19 October 2018). The family resides in Brisbane, Australia.

== Filmography ==
=== Film ===
Year	Title	Role	Notes
2000	Max Knight: Ultra Spy	Lindsay	TV film
2000	Stepsister from Planet Weird	Jill	TV film
2001	Finding Hope	Bonnie	TV film
2002	Till Human Voices Wake Us	Silvy Lewis	Feature film
2003	Ned Kelly	Maggie	Feature film
2003	Tempted	Jamie	TV film
2009	Crush	Clare	Feature film
2010	Cockroach	Sera	Short film
2010	Not Available	Sally Davis	TV film
2012	Jack Irish: Black Tide	Transquik Receptionist	TV film

=== Television ===
Year	Title	Role	Notes
1996-97	The Wayne Manifesto	Rosie	TV series
1997	Roar	Amalia	TV series, episode: "Tash"
1998	Misery Guts	Tracy	TV series
1999	Home and Away	Hope Benedict	TV series, 2 episodes
1999	BeastMaster	Princess Jessica	TV series, episode: "The Last Unicorns"
2000	Flipper	Emma	TV series, episode: "Prodigal Father"
2001	All Saints	Tamara Morgan	TV series, episode: "Close to Home"
2002	McLeod's Daughters	Skye Harding	TV series, episode: "Blame It on the Moonlight"
2003	Pirate Islands	Kate Redding (main role)	TV series, 26 episodes
2003	White Collar Blue	Joy Garret	TV series, episode: "2.10"
2003	The Sleepover Club	Sam	TV series, episode: "Blind Date"
2004–05	The Secret Life of Us	Bree Sanzaro (main role)	TV series, 20 episodes
2005–06	headLand	Kate Monk (main role)	TV series; 58 episodes
2007	Spy Shop	Jessica Jenkins	TV series; 3 episodes
2009	Sea Patrol	Jessica Taylor	TV series, episode: "Half Life"
2010	Spartacus: Blood and Sand	Licinia	TV series, 2 episodes
2010	Rake	Bec Chandler	TV series, episode: "R vs Chandler"
2012–13	Dance Academy	Saskia Duncan	TV series, 16 episodes
2015	Banished	Deborah	TV series, 7 episodes
