= Sylvio Tabet =

Lebanese filmmaker and producer

Sylvio Tabet (born in Beirut, Lebanon) is a Lebanese filmmaker and Producer. The only movie he directed was Beastmaster 2: Through the Portal of Time.

Some of his books that have been published include A Journey to Shanti and Repetitions.

== Selected filmography ==
- Dead Ringers, 1988 – Executive Producer
- The Cotton Club, 1984 – Co-Producer
- The Beastmaster, 1982 – Executive Producer
- Evilspeak, 1981 – Co-Producer
- Fade to Black, 1980 – Executive Producer
- Bilitis, 1977 – Executive Producer

== Resources ==
- Sylvio Tabet at IMDb
- Official website
- A Journey to Shanti website
