= Beastmaster 2: Through the Portal of Time =

1991 American fantasy adventure film

- Theatrical release poster
- Directed by: Sylvio Tabet
- Screenplay by: Jim Wynorski; R. J. Robertson; Sylvio Tabet; Ken Hauser; Doug Miles
- Story by: Jim Wynorski; R. J. Robertson
- Based on: The Beast Master by Andre Norton and Characters by Don Coscarelli; Paul Pepperman
- Produced by: Sylvio Tabet
- Starring: Marc Singer; Kari Wuhrer; Sarah Douglas; Wings Hauser
- Cinematography: Ronn Schmidt
- Edited by: Adam Bernardi
- Music by: Robert Folk
- Production companies: Republic Pictures; Les Films 21
- Distributed by: New Line Cinema
- Release date: August 30, 1991
- Running time: 107 minutes
- Country: United States
- Language: English
- Budget: $6 million
- Box office: $773,490–869,325

Beastmaster 2: Through the Portal of Time is a 1991 American sequel to the 1982 film The Beastmaster. Marc Singer reprises his role as Dar, a barbarian from another dimension who travels to 1990s Los Angeles and befriends a young woman, Jackie Trent, played by Kari Wuhrer. Dar must stop his evil brother, played by Wings Hauser, from bringing back a neutron bomb.

== Plot ==
"In the days following the death of King Zed, a darkness has fallen over the land of Arok. The evil warlord Arklon, using unholy magic, has enslaved the people. Their only hope rests with the rebel forces marshalling in the East under the leadership of Dar, the Beastmaster."

— Opening Introduction

Dar, known throughout the land as The Beastmaster, is captured and brought before Lord Arklon's tribunal, which sentences him death for rebel complicity, and for witchcraft due to his ability to communicate with animals. Dar's tiger (Note: In the original 1982 film The Beastmaster, Ruh was a tiger dyed black to look like a panther, because tigers are easier to handle during filming. For the sequel, Beastmaster 2, a Bengal tiger is used without the black dye. For the Television Movie Beastmaster 3 a lion was used instead of a tiger.) Ruh attacks the executioner before his axe can kill Dar, and his ferrets Kodo and Podo chew through the rope binding his hands. Dar battles Arklon's men, eventually confronting Arklon, but is held back by his remaining guards. Dar's eagle, Sharak, claws at Arklon's face, allowing Dar to escape.

In a desert canyon, the rebel leader calls for the witch Lyranna to find Arklon's army, but he is killed by one of Arklon's archers. Arklon wields the magical Key of Magog to kill the rebel forces with earth and fire. Lyranna warns Arklon that the power of the Key is not eternal and offers to show him how to become the most powerful man on Earth, equal to the gods.

In the swamp, a beast attacks Arklon's men, but ceases when it sees Dar's brand, recognizing him as King Zed's son. The beast reveals that she is Zed's sister, transformed into her current form by forbidden rituals. She then explains how the evil high priest Maax ordered King Zed's unborn child transplanted from the womb into a beast of burden, which granted Dar mastery over animals (as portrayed in The Beastmaster). But Dar is Zed's second-born son. Zed's firstborn, Arklon, was stolen by Zhun priests and raised cruelly. She warns Dar to find and kill the evil Lord Arklon before the autumn equinox, else all life in his world will perish.

Lyranna shows Arklon a dimensional doorway to a parallel plane leading to modern-day Los Angeles and the ultimate power; a neutron detonator powerful enough to decimate an entire continent.

Meanwhile in L.A., Senator Herbert Trent's daughter Jackie is chased by policemen while speeding to her sister's wedding. She crashes through the portal, escapes capture by Arklon's men, and is found by Ruh and Dar. Jackie is eventually captured by Arklon's men, and must trade information for her return to L.A.. She reveals her father's friend Admiral Binns is Chief of Pacific Operations. Dar catches up and follows them through the portal into L.A., but must first deal with Police Lieutenant Coberly who has Dar arrested, and Ruh sent to the zoo.

Jackie escapes Arklon at a clothing store and returns home. Bendowski tells Lt. Coberly what Arklon's "laser" (the Key of Magog) did to the store. Coberly questions Dar, who escapes and is picked up by Jackie who drives them away, passing Hollywood Pantages Theatre where "Beastmaster II: Through the Portal of Time" is on the marquee.

Arklon magically "feeds" on the memories of an Army Lieutenant Colonel to gain entrance to the U.S. Army Strategic Research and Development Center, where Arklon and Lyranna take the neutron detonator, which has been armed. Arklon double-crosses Lyranna by feeding on her memories to open the portal without her help. While the detonator counts down, Dar blocks Arklon from returning through the portal. Arklon flees when police arrive, and ends up at Adventure Island where Dar fights him while zoo animals observe.

General (Note: While credited as "Admiral Binns" and referred to as an Admiral in dialog by Jackie, other characters call him General Binns in dialog. General is an equivalent Army rank for a Navy Admiral.) Binns disarms the detonator. Dar leaves Kodo and Podo with Jackie and takes the Key of Magog back through the portal to use it for the good of the people. Pilgrims gather "to worship the sacred object left by the gods," Jackie's Porsche, which blares out rock music.

== Cast ==
- Marc Singer as Dar
- Kari Wuhrer as Jackie Trent
- Sarah Douglas as Lyranna
- Wings Hauser as Arklon
- James Avery as Lieutenant Coberly
- Robert Fieldsteel as Bendowski
- Arthur Malet as Wendel
- Robert Z'Dar as Zavic
- Michael Berryman as Pilgrim #1
- Carl Ciarfalio as Policeman #2
- Larry Dobkin as Admiral Binns
- Arthur Malet as Wendel
- Wayne Pére as Punker #2
- Dick Warlock as Scientist #1
- Dan Woren as Policeman #1
- Frank Welker as The Voices of Sharak, Kodo, Podo & Ruh

== Production ==
Jim Wynorski was originally meant to direct and wrote a screenplay with R. J. Robertson for producer Sylvio Tabet. Wynorski later said:

We wrote him a helluva good screenplay. Then at the last moment, he pulls the rug out from under me and says he's directing it himself. And then tops it off by threatening to take our writing credits off the picture. I took the bastard straight to court. He hired big time attorneys to stall paying out the final script installments. I hated his guts. But I got the last laugh when Republic Pictures picked up the show. They wanted a picture totally clean of legal entanglements. So they came to me to make a deal and I held them up but good. Cleaned up. I still remember Tabet's pained face when I told him what it would take to get me to sign off. Even my own lawyer whined!

Shooting locations include Glen Canyon and Antelope Canyon. Parts of the film were also shot in Los Angeles and Canoga Park, California as well as the Grand Canyon in Arizona. Director and co-writer Sylvio Tabet was a producer on the original film. Opening screen credits read "Adapted from the Book The Beast Master by Andre Norton." After reading the first film's screenplay, Norton had her credit removed, but her agent talked her into allowing it for the sequel.

== Release ==
Beastmaster 2 was given a limited release in the United States, where it grossed between $773,490 and $869,325.

== Reception ==
Rotten Tomatoes, a review aggregator, reports that 17% of six surveyed critics gave the film a positive review; the average rating is 3/10. Kevin Thomas of the Los Angeles Times called it "a silly, ill-advised sequel" that is not funny despite Singer's "likable presence". Roger Hurlburt of the Sun-Sentinel wrote that the film is tongue-in-cheek enough to make audiences forgive its frivolity. Hurlburt also complimented Douglas' acting. Chris Hicks of the Deseret News wrote that the film is not clever or funny enough to overcome its silliness. TV Guide, in rating it 2/4 stars, wrote: "The satire in Beastmaster 2 hardly breaks new ground, but it's a tonic that makes the minutes pass more or less agreeably". Like Beastmaster, it was broadcast regularly on American cable television stations TBS and TNT.

== Sequel ==
A sequel titled Beastmaster III: The Eye of Braxus was released in 1996.
