= The Beast Master =

1959 novel by Andre Norton

- Cover of the first edition
- Author: Alice "Andre" Norton
- Cover artist: Richard M. Powers
- Language: English
- Series: Beast Master; Hosteen Storm
- Genre: Science fiction
- Publisher: Harcourt, Brace
- Publication date: August 1959
- Publication place: United States
- Media type: Print (hardcover; abridged paperback)
- Pages: 192 (first edition)
- ISBN: 0-15-206049-9 (edition?)
- OCLC: 586722
- LC Class: PS3527.O632 B4
- Followed by: Lord of Thunder

The Beast Master is a science fiction novel by American writer Alice "Andre" Norton, published by Harcourt in 1959. It inaugurated the Beast Master series, or Hosteen Storm series after the main character. In German-language translation it was published as Der Letzte der Navajos (de: Arthur Moewig Verlag, 1963) —literally, The Last of the Navajo.

Norton wrote one sequel published in 1962 and three by Andre Norton and Lyn McConchie of New Zealand were published forty years later, one of them after Norton's death in 2005. According to McConchie, they were "written solely by Lyn from a brief collaborated outline". The first two latter-day sequels were named the year's best novel by New Zealand science fiction fans (Sir Julius Vogel Award).

== Plot summary ==
The Beast Master tells of Hosteen Storm, a Navajo and former soldier who has empathic and telepathic connections with a group of genetically altered animals. The team emigrates from Earth to the distant planet Arzor where it is hired to herd livestock. Storm still harbors wrath at his former enemies, the Xik, and has sworn revenge on a man named Quade for his father's murder. According to Kirkus, he finds "life and hope" instead.

In this novel and its sequels, Norton explores aspects of Native American culture, specifically the Navajo, through metaphors in Storm's life and in the culture he adopts on his adoptive planet.

== Reception ==
Galaxy reviewer Floyd C. Gale rated the novel four stars out of five "for youngsters", saying that they "are sure to enjoy complete enthrallment".

Kirkus Reviews concluded that the "fantasy is made convincing by the author's boldness of imagination and by his ability to yield totally to the atmosphere which he creates." This was one of several reviews by Kirkus from 1958 to 1963 that reveal that the reviewer presumed Andre Norton to be a man. Some others were The Time Traders and its three sequels.

In Norton's sequel Lord of Thunder (1962), Hosteen Storm discovers and resolves a problem with stakes on a world scale. Kirkus concluded that that story "is secondary to the fascinating description, the imaginative ideas, and the general quality of prose and dialogue. For the experienced science-fiction reader."

Kirkus welcomed the continuation of the series by Norton and Lyn McConchie in Beast Master's Ark (Tor, 2002), including the promise of a fourth installment: "[T]hat's good, since this is one of the better SF series going, with Norton using stripped prose to put her stereotypes through their foredestined rounds. ... Neat, swift, and strongly detailed. Old fans will dance and howl for more". McConchie claims to be sole author of the prose.

== Adaptations ==
The novel was loosely adapted into the 1982 sword and sorcery film The Beastmaster, starring Marc Singer. Norton was unhappy with the liberties taken with the film's script and asked for her name to be removed from the credits. It was followed by two sequels and a TV series.

== Series ==
- The Beast Master (Harcourt, Brace, 1959)
- Lord of Thunder (Harcourt, 1962)
- Beast Master's Ark (Tor Books, 2002), by Norton and Lyn McConchie
- Beast Master's Circus (Tor, 2004), Norton and McConchie
- Beast Master's Quest (Tor, 2006), Norton (deceased) and McConchie

Omnibus editions

The Doubleday Science Fiction Book Club (SFBC) released an omnibus edition of the 2002 and 2004 collaborations, contemporary to Tor's first edition of the latter. One year later, a few months after Norton's death, Tor published an omnibus edition of the first two books, which was also carried by SFBC.

- Beast Master Team (SFBC, 2004) contains Beast Master's Ark and Beast Master's Circus
- Beast Master's Planet (Tor, 2005; SFBC, 2005) contains Beast Master and Lord of Thunder — subtitled on the front cover, "The Two Original Hosteen Storm Adventure Novels"

== Sources ==
- Tuck, Donald H. (1978). The Encyclopedia of Science Fiction and Fantasy. Chicago: Advent. p. 331. ISBN 0-911682-22-8.
