= Lana Crawford =

Fictional character in Neighbours

- Neighbours character
- Portrayed by: Bridget Neval
- Duration: 2004–2005, 2020
- First appearance: 30 August 2004
- Last appearance: 25 March 2020
- Introduced by: Ric Pellizzeri (2004); Jason Herbison (2020)
In-universe information
- Occupation: Student; Waitress; Cartoon writer
- Mother: Joan Crawford
- Wife: Sky Mangel (2020–)
- Stepdaughters: Kerry Mangel
- First cousins: Penny Watts; Sindi Watts

Lana Crawford is a fictional character from the Australian soap opera Neighbours, played by Bridget Neval. The actress's casting was announced in June 2004, and she stated that she was excited to take on the role of Lana, a schoolgirl and the serial's first lesbian character. Neval explained that Lana's sexuality did not bother her, but she hoped her story would not be told in a sensationalist or distasteful way. Neval made her first screen appearance as Lana during the episode broadcast on 30 August 2004 and departed on 13 January 2005. Despite being retired from acting, Neval agreed to reprise the role for the show's 35th anniversary celebrations, which saw Lana marry Sky.

Lana was introduced as a high school student, who has been closeted due to homophobic bullying at her previous school. Upon moving to Erinsborough, Lana befriends Serena Bishop (Lara Sacher) and Serena's cousin Sky Mangel (Stephanie McIntosh), whom she develops a crush on. The storyline between Lana and Sky was billed as a relationship story between two close female friends, "made compelling by the complexity of the feelings involved." Lana and Sky's friendship eventually culminated in Neighbours' first lesbian kiss.

The episode featuring the kiss was broadcast in the serial's regular G-rated timeslot and gave Neighbours a small increase in ratings. However, it led talkback callers and conservative groups to attack the storyline and the characters. Writers for AfterEllen and the Sydney Star Observer branded the storyline "a real television advance" and praised Lana and her journey. The show's executive producer, Ric Pellizzeri, believed the storyline reflected reality and some viewers said that it had had a "profound effect" on them.

== Casting ==
In June 2004, Pete Timbs of TV Week reported Wicked Science actress Bridget Neval had joined the cast of Neighbours as Lana Crawford. Timbs revealed that Lana was a schoolgirl set to "liven things up among the Ramsay Street teenagers as she comes to terms with her sexuality." Neval told Timbs' colleague Helen Vnuk that she was initially taken aback when she learned of the character she might be asked to play. However, she was very excited to take on the role of Lana, calling her "a fantastic character".

Neval later explained "My initial reaction to the part was surprise as Neighbours have never had a gay character. But the nature of the character never really bothered me. My only real concern was that the story would not be told in a sensationalist or distasteful way. She's not a stereotypical character and being gay is certainly not the only interesting thing about her." Neval made her first screen appearance as Lana during the episode broadcast on 30 August 2004. In April 2005, Eliza Taylor-Cotter said that she had originally auditioned for the role of Lana, before joining the cast as Janae Timmins.

== Development ==
"The first gay character on the long-running Australian soap, teenage newcomer Lana discovered a soulmate in straight series regular Sky. Their friendship survived Lana's early crush, Sky's sexual confusion, and homophobic pressures from outsiders, and they emerged as platonic BFFs who took each other to the prom."

— An AfterEllen writer on Lana and Sky

Lana was introduced as Neighbours' first lesbian character. Neval revealed that while Lana would fuel a storyline for established character Sky Mangel (Stephanie McIntosh), she would also go through her own journey. A representative from Grundy Television explained that the storyline would be "a relationship story of a close female friendship, made compelling by the complexity of the feelings involved." The representative believed the storyline would "strike a chord" with teenage viewers, who could relate to Sky and Lana's feelings. Scriptwriter Helen MacWhirter also stated that Lana's story is "multi-faceted", saying, "On one level it's about a young girl coming to terms with her sexuality, which on its own might have been a bit boring and gratuitous, but it also brought into play other story strands which added depth and dimension."

Lana was a "pretty" Canadian high school student. She left her old high school due to homophobic bullying, and as a result she became "very closeted". Describing the character, Natasha Norton from AfterEllen stated "She comes across at first as a touch flighty, as if she can't quite make up her mind as to who she wants to be, but it soon becomes abundantly clear that Lana's carefully constructed façade has a purpose." Following her arrival in Erinsborough, Lana befriended Serena Bishop (Lara Sacher). They both learned that they had been taken advantage of by "sleazy" photographer Chris Cousens (Simon Mallory). Serena's cousin, Sky, took an instant dislike to Lana. Sky had learned that Lana had flirted with her boyfriend, leaving her "less than impressed". During a game of basketball, Sky began feuding with Lana, and they started a brawl on the court. Of filming the fight, Neval stated, "We wanted to make it look spontaneous, and really gritty and brawly. It was a lot of fun learning how to choreograph a fight and how to be aware of the other actor and not actually hurt them."

After being placed in detention together, Lana and Sky came to know each other better. They gradually formed a bond, and Lana developed feelings for Sky. Lana's crush on Sky eventually culminated in Neighbours' first lesbian kiss. The episode featuring the kiss was broadcast in its usual 6.30pm G-rated timeslot. The executive producer of Neighbours, Ric Pellizzeri, said the storyline reflected reality and continued the show's move toward more contemporary issues. Pellizzeri explained that Neighbours was simply telling "a story about tolerance." The producer added that the kiss was as far as they would go, but the writers would not be discouraged from telling other stories about homosexuality in the future. On-screen, Sky told Lana that she was only interested in her boyfriend, but they remained friends. With her main storyline completed, Lana was seen attending the prom with a female admirer, before moving to Canada with her family. Script producer Luke Devenish told a reporter for the Sydney Star Observer, "There is that great tradition that the lesbian is always dead in the final scene, and we were very aware of that as we were writing her out. We wanted to avoid that at all costs."

On 13 December 2019, it was announced that Neval had reprised the role for the serial's 35th anniversary celebrations in March 2020. In a post to her Instagram account, Neval explained that she had retired from acting, but she could not refuse a request from series producer Jason Herbison to return, after learning that Lana would be reunited with Sky. The characters will marry upon their return to Erinsborough, having reconnected off-screen.

== Storylines ==
Lana is Sindi (Marisa Warrington) and Penny Watts' (Andrea McEwan) cousin. She was born in Australia, but her family moved to Canada when she was young. They returned to Australia a few years later, and Lana began attending Wattle Heights High School, where she was bullied over her sexuality. This led her to transfer to Erinsborough High. Lana finds employment at the Coffee Shop alongside Serena Bishop, whom she befriends. Lana is convinced that she had seen Serena before, and she realises that Serena had been in some photos taken by dodgy photographer Chris Cousens. Lana admits to Serena that she had also been taken in by Chris and that she was not over it. Lana did not get on with Serena's cousin, Sky, and one day they fight at school. Susan Kennedy (Jackie Woodburne) places them in detention and urges them to work things out.

Sky and Lana start to trust each other a little, and during a sleepover organised by Serena, they discover that they both like black and white films. They bond, and Lana later watches Sky fall asleep. Sky realises that Lana has hidden depths and tells her. Lana gets upset and tells Sky that she is not hiding anything. Sky calls a friend who attended Wattle Heights High with Lana and finds out about the bullying that caused Lana to change schools. During a playfight at a sleepover, Lana suddenly kisses Sky. She runs out of the house and goes to the Coffee Shop, where she finds Sindi. Lana reveals to Sindi that she is gay. Lana admits that she does not want to lose Sky as a friend and tries to pass the kiss off as a joke. Sky tells Boyd Hoyland (Kyal Marsh) about the kiss, and Lana is later outed at school.

Lana attempts to convince everyone that it is just a rumour by dating Brendan Bond (Michael Wahr). When Sky finds out that Lana is planning to have sex with Brendan during a party, Sky tries to stop her. Lana tells Sky to leave, but then decides to tell Brendan that she cannot have sex with him because she likes girls. Lana receives anonymous notes in her locker praising her for being brave. However, she is also targeted by a gang of girls who threaten to cut her hair off. Susan decides to get the school involved in a tolerance campaign, but many of the parents protest about it. Sky and Lana begin drawing a cartoon strip together called Freak Girl and The Enigma and Buffy Only (Laura Gordon), the editor of a gay magazine, becomes interested in publishing it. Buffy later asks Lana out on a date, but comes to realise that they are not right for each other.

Sky and Lana decide to plant lavender outside Lassiter's Hotel, and they stay to watch everyone's reactions. During her excitement, Sky kisses Lana, who is delighted as she believes Sky has fallen for her. Sky explains to Lana that they can only be friends, and Lana accuses Sky of using her. Lana avoids Sky for several days, but they eventually make up. Lana finds a note in her locker from someone named George, asking her to the end-of-year formal dance. During the formal, "George" introduces herself as Georgina Harris (Adrienne Smith), and she and Lana spend the rest of the night together. Lana decides to return to Canada, and her friends throw her a farewell party. Sky tells Lana that she will miss her and gives her a pen, so she can start writing her own novel. Lana says goodbye to George, and Lana's friends watch as Lana leaves Ramsay Street in a taxi.

Lana returns to Erinsborough fifteen years later to join Sky. They reveal to Sky's family that they reconnected about six months ago and are getting married at the Lassiters Wedding Expo, but only after Sky informs her former partner Dylan Timmins (Damien Bodie). Dylan arrives the following day and eventually gives his blessing, but Sky wants to cancel the wedding after their venue is ruined. Terese Willis (Rebekah Elmaloglou) arranges for them to marry at The 82, a former tram turned restaurant. Sky and Lana are married by Jack Callahan (Andrew Morley). Sky stays in Erinsborough for work, while Lana leaves for a book tour.

== Reception ==
Shortly after the episode featuring the kiss was aired, the characters were attacked by talkback callers and conservative groups who thought that they had been "glamorising a high-risk culture" and "making homosexuality look cool". Chief executive of the Christian group Salt Shakers, Peter Stokes, told The Age's Kenneth Nguyen, "It just saddens me that we give our young people the message that these relationships are OK." However, Ray Misson, the head of Melbourne University's arts education department, described the serial's depiction of a lesbian as "a real advance." Neval believed that gay teenagers, who were already feeling insecure about how their sexuality would be accepted, would be devastated by the negative reaction surrounding the storyline.

On the reaction the kiss between Lana and Sky received, Natasha Norton from AfterEllen stated, "From the amount of backlash this kiss generated in Australia, you'd think that they'd shown a full blown love scene; newspapers have been full of angry letters to the editor decrying the gay storyline. The negative reaction by many in the Australia press mirrors Lana's current storyline on Neighbours, which explores the backlash Lana experiences when her sexuality becomes public knowledge at her high school." Norton's colleague, Malinda Lo, later said that many of the website's readers said Lana's storyline had a "profound effect" on them when they were teenagers. A writer from GayNZ.com noted that the episode featuring the kiss was broadcast unedited and provided Neighbours with a modest ratings increase.

Bill Muehlenberg from the Australian Family Association believed Lana's introduction and storyline was just an attempt to increase ratings. A Sydney Star Observer reporter praised Lana's cousin, Sindi, for being sympathetic and reacting in a positive way when Lana came out to her. The reporter also praised Sky's reaction for being "more let's talk about it than get away from me, you lezzo freak", while adding that it seemed Neighbours had wanted Lana to be a "sympathetic gay character", which must have upset the Christian groups. Of Lana's storyline, a writer for AfterEllen stated, "The significance of this depiction was that it occurred in a relatively conservative, family-oriented show with a large child viewership, and all the major sympathetic characters were presented as supportive of Lana's sexuality, with the bullies being depicted as villains."

In his book Neighbours: 20 years of Ramsay Street, Tony Johnston wrote, "Vilified by ultra-conservative groups and celebrated by the gay press, the kiss helped to redefine Neighbours as it entered its third decade." In July 2007, the Herald Sun asked readers to vote for their top ten Neighbours moments. Lana and Sky's kiss came in at number nine, and a reporter for the paper said "It's rare that Neighbours attracts the attention of the shock jocks around the country, but that's what happened when Sky Bishop, played by Stephanie McIntosh, gave Lana, played by Bridget Neval, a kiss. Sky was exploring her sexuality and the scene was one of the most talked about ever in the press. Lana left Erinsborough and Sky has gone on to be an unmarried mum".
