= Hercules (miniseries) =

- Genre: Adventure; Drama; Fantasy
- Written by: Charles Edward Pogue
- Directed by: Roger Young
- Starring: Paul Telfer; Elizabeth Perkins; Sean Astin; Tyler Mane; Timothy Dalton; Leelee Sobieski
- Narrated by: Robert Clotworthy
- Music by: Patrick Williams
- Country of origin: United States
- No. of episodes: 2

Production
- Executive producer: Robert Halmi
- Producer: Jeffrey M. Hayes
- Cinematography: Donald M. Morgan
- Editor: Benjamin A. Weissman
- Running time: 178 minutes
- Production company: Hallmark Entertainment

Original release
- Network: NBC
- Release: May 16, 2005 – 2005

Hercules is a 2005 American television miniseries chronicling the life of the legendary Greek hero, Heracles, called Hercules in this series. It is most often aired on television as a two-part miniseries: the first part documents his early life in Tiryns and his desire and marriage to the lady Megara; the second part follows the more widely recognised part of his life, in seeking redemption for the madness-induced murder of his family.

The series incorporates Hercules's murder of his family—usually not included in modern interpretations of the character—and includes five of his twelve labors from Greek mythology. The series alters some of the elements of the myths including placing the giant Antaeus (Although seemingly possessed by Zeus) as his father while in Greek myths his father was the king of the gods, Zeus.

== Plot ==
=== Part 1 ===
Amphitryon and his men are transporting the Cretan criminal Antaeus by ship. Amphitryon worships Zeus, and mocks his prisoner for worshiping Hera by scarring his arm with a lightning bolt symbol. Antaeus breaks free and jumps overboard.

Alcmene, Amphitryon's wife, is High Priestess of the Harvest Festival, a yearly ritual devoted to Hera, which involves the human sacrifice of a male. After it is discovered that the intended victim, Tiresias, is intersex, the priestesses release him, but gouge out his eyes.

On her way home, Alcmene is assaulted and raped by a large man, his face hidden in the darkness. The crime is witnessed by a lyre player, Linus, who declares the culprit to be Zeus, due to the lightning symbol on his arm. Amphitryon arrives home, comforts his wife, and makes love to her. Alcmene becomes pregnant.

Alcmene gives birth to fraternal twin sons. She believes this will make her heir to the House of Perseus in Thebes, but is informed that her uncle already had a son, Eurystheus, who will be the heir. She visits the Harpies, to determine which child belongs to Amphitryon and which belongs to Zeus. One Harpy attempts to nurse one baby, who bites her breast. The Harpies declare him Son of Zeus, name him "Hercules -- glory to Hera", and order Alcmene to kill him, departing afterward.

Alcmene names the other son, Iphicles, and begs Amphitryon to kill Hercules. He cannot bring himself to do it, so she sends two snakes into Hercules' crib. The baby picks them up and squeezes them to death.

As a teenager, Hercules is headstrong, foolish, and prideful. He is constantly ridiculed and disdained by his mother, brother, and King Eurystheus. He develops an unrequited crush on Alcmene's protégé, Megara, who refuses to associate with him because she worships Hera. While being tutored by Linus, Hercules loses his temper and strikes Linus in the head, knocking him out. Everyone mistakes him for dead, so they exile Hercules to the mountains. Before he leaves, Amphitryon tells him he is Son of Zeus.

Hercules lets this news go to his head, but Chiron chides him, saying that our choices define us, not our blood. One day, Hercules is invited to join his father and King Theseus in a hunt for a wild boar, Ragged-Tusk. During the hunt, he encounters a bathing wood nymph, Deianeira, and steals her clothes. Linus, who had been her guest at this time, poses as his own ghost and frightens him into returning the clothing to her. After getting dressed, Deianeira joins the hunt alongside Hercules. Ragged-Tusk gores Hercules in the thigh before Deianeira can kill the boar with her arrows.

The wood nymph brings the boy into her home and treats his injuries. He clumsily tries to kiss her, but she teaches him to apply tenderness and affection instead of force and lust. Hercules confides that he had never experienced these things before. Deianeira confides that the human sacrifices and other barbaric spectacles are not Hera's will, but corruptions brought on by the people in charge of the rituals. She gives him an archery lesson. He proposes to her, but she tells him he is still in love with Megara.

He meets Megara, unaware that she is drunk and/or drugged, and has sex with her. The next day, Megara hates him more than ever, declaring that he had violated her, then declares him the father of her children. Later, when he and Chiron are training, they are attacked by Antaeus. The two are overwhelmed by the man's superhuman strength and are nearly killed, until he is driven off by passing soldiers. Hercules, realizing how deficient his talents are, finally takes his training seriously.

Years later, Hercules has grown into a disciplined warrior with superhuman strength. He teams up with Linus and Amphitryon to battle the Hydra, which is attacking the countryside. The monster initially has two heads, but they discover it regrows them doubling their number every time they cut them off. They learn to overcome this ability by setting its neck stumps on fire, killing it. Unfortunately, Amphitryon is killed, but not before telling his son how proud he is.

As a reward for saving the town, Hercules is given Megara to marry, but neither she nor their three sons from their earlier encounter love him. Megara, King Eurystheus (her lover), and Alcmene plot his destruction, for being Son of Zeus and technically, Hera's enemy. They drug him, then send his sons to kill him. Hercules defends himself and kills them, realizing too late who they were. In despair, he throws himself into a fire and attempts to stab himself. A lightning bolt knocks him unconscious and rain extinguishes the flames.

=== Part 2 ===
Deianeira treats his injuries, and makes love to him while he is still in a drugged and feverish state. They visit Tiresias, now a prophet, who declares that to atone for his sins, he must perform six labors for King Eurystheus and the now Queen Megara.

For the first labor, he must kill the Stymphalian Birds. He and Linus find them, discovering they are the same Harpies from earlier, and kill them, taking back their heads as proof. Alcmene secretly pours blood on one head to revive it, and ask it for advice on how to kill Hercules. It suggests the Nemean Lion.

Megara gives birth to a daughter, Iole, but Tiresias prophesizes that Iole's husband will kill Eurystheus, putting him on edge.

For the second labor, he must kill the lion. Hercules and Linus journey to its cave. Alone, Hercules finds a seductive, beautiful woman hiding nude in the cave, but she is revealed to be a sphinx turned into human in order to deceive him, and she transforms into her true form to attack him. Hercules kills the monster with its own claws and puts on its nigh-indestructible skin as a cape.

For the third labor, he must capture the Cretan Bull. The Cretan Bull is really the leader of a gang of marauders. Hercules, Linus, Chiron, and an army led by Nestor stand against the gang. As the gang is defeated, The Bull kills Chiron. Hercules unmasks him as Antaeus. They battle, evenly matched, but when Antaeus boasts that his strength comes from the earth itself, Hercules knocks him into a river, rendering him helpless. Hercules brings him back to Thebes, and suggests locking him in a tower, cutting him off from the earth and keeping him too weak to break free.

Hercules and Linus return to Deianeira's home to rest. She is caring for a boy named Hyllus, and claims that he is adopted. Hercules and the boy quickly bond, and Linus deduces that he is Hercules and Deianeira's son from their earlier encounter.

Megara walks in on Iphicles and Eurystheus having a sexual encounter. Eurystheus names Iphicles his heir. In despair, she bribes Antaeus with a handful of dirt for advice on how to kill Hercules. He suggests the man-eating mares.

For the fourth labor, he must tame the man-eating mares, and give Iole the necklace belonging to their leader. He and Linus sail with Jason and the Argonauts to the island where they live. They discover Hyllus stowed away, wanting to join them. When they arrive, they find King Theseus had been shipwrecked on the island and is now the lover of Queen Hippolyta of the Amazons, who live on the island too. She tells them the mares are due to arrive that night, and they must leave if they are to survive. At nightfall, the Amazons transform into the man-eating mares and attack. Jason stabs a mare with his spear; she turns back into a human and cries out in pain as she falls. Hercules pulls Hippolyta's necklace off, turning them back to normal. The Amazons apologize, saying they had no choice, that it was Hera's bidding, but Hercules picks up the girl who was killed by Jason asking if they really believe that bloodshed and suffering are what the goddess wants. He says this was not Hera's will, but was human-doing. Remembering Deianeira's words, he proclaims they have a choice in following such superstitions.

Alcmene and Megara conduct another Harvest Festival, but Alcmene discovers too late that the sacrifice is Iphicles. As Iphicles is stabbed to death as part of the ritual, Megara pulls the distraught Alcmene aside, saying that slow revenge is sweet. After the ritual, Megara approaches Alcmene, who is attempting to move Iphicles' body. Megara acknowledges that after so many years of adoration, Alcmene had turned on Megara and plotted against her with Eurytheus. Megara goes on to say that Alcmene had shaped her to be who she is, and that Alcmene is to blame for Megara's treacherous ways.

Hercules returns with the Amazons. Deianeira works up the courage to tell Hercules that Hyllus is his son, and that she loves him. He is shocked and immediately thinks back to the night Deianeira first had sex with him, which until now he had thought to be a dream. She tells him he has a home with Hyllus and herself now, if he wants it. He accepts, and they have sex.

Hercules gives Iole the necklace for a second, then destroys it to prevent its curse from ever affecting anyone again. Hercules, Theseus, and the Amazons convince Thebes to abolish the Harvest Festival and other barbaric rites, but Hercules is informed of his brother's death and is saddened.

For the fifth labor, Hercules must defeat Eurystheus in contest of archery skill, the challenge being to 'bring down' the Ceryneian Hind. If Hercules loses he must perform an extra labor, but if he wins, he gets one favor. Hercules declares the favor will be the betrothal of Hyllus to Iole, securing a union of the warring families and ending the conflict between them. Deianeira warns that the Hind is sacred and to spill a drop of its blood is an offense punishable by the gods, but Hercules tells her to trust him. As the contest begins, the Hind appears with Hyllus on its back. Eurystheus shoots first, uncaring of the danger to Hyllus. Hercules deflects the shot by firing an arrow through Eurystheus', and a second through two of the Hinds legs without hitting any of its blood vessels. In his haste to win the contest, Eurystheus approaches the Hind with intent to kill it, but is stopped by Hercules. Hercules leaves judgment to Creon, who announces Hercules the winner given the task was only to bring the hind down, not kill it. Despite Hercules' victory, Eurystheus dishonorably recants his public acceptance of Hercules' requested favor, wary of the prophecy.

Megara secretly releases Antaeus, plotting to kill both Hercules and Eurystheus, then take over.

For the sixth labor, Hercules must defeat Cerberus. Hercules and Linus row down a river into a cave, where they meet Antaeus. He boasts that his strength is at its maximum, since they are underground. Hercules nevertheless gains the upper hand and nearly drowns his opponent, but Linus finally realizes that he was the one who raped Alcmene, not Zeus. Shocked, Hercules nearly loses, but decides it doesn't matter. No matter who his father is, he will continue to be a hero. A section of the cave collapses on Antaeus, killing him. Hercules takes a medallion that Megara had given the brute.

Hercules meets with Alcmene and Tiresias at a clifftop. Tiresias grants that Hercules has completed his last labor and is no longer indebted to Eurystheus, but cautions that the conflict between the two is not resolved. After telling him that she is proud of what he is accomplishing, Alcmene hugs and kisses Hercules for the first time in his life. She says she cannot live in his new world, and then intentionally falls off the cliff to her death.

Hercules comes before Eurystheus, the gathered crowd questioning his victory in the absence of evidence of Cerberus' demise. There is no Cerberus, but since Antaeus stood in its place, he has completed the last labor. Hercules states that he never had any intention of taking the throne, all he wants is for Eurystheus to keep his word and grant the betrothal of Hyllus and Iole. The King refuses and orders his army to attack. The crowd sides with Hercules, as it is composed of many Hercules has helped personally and many others who view him as a hero. At the climax of the battle, Eurystheus and Hercules stand with bows aimed at each other. A guard holds a knife to Hyllus' throat. Eurystheus orders Hercules to lower his bow, but Hercules counters that Eurystheus would then kill them both. As tension mounts, Hercules fires an arrow into the guard holding Hyllus and deflects an arrow from Eurystheus. Immediately after the guard falls dead, Hyllus throws a knife into Eurystheus, fulfilling the prophecy. Iole runs to Hyllus, and with his dying breath Eurystheus fires an arrow at Hyllus and Iole, intent that their union never happen. Simultaneously, Megara rushes forward to pull Iole from Hyllus, but she is struck in the back with Eurystheus' arrow. As she dies, Hercules tells her the union of Hyllus and Iole could heal the rift between the warring clans and possibly the rift between Zeus and Hera themselves. Megara responds that their union cannot heal her wounds, which is why she opposed it.

In the final scene, Hercules and Deianeira get married. They kiss, then Iole and Hyllus kiss as well.

== Cast ==
- Paul Telfer as Hercules
- Leelee Sobieski as Deianeira
- Sean Astin as Linus
- Timothy Dalton as Amphitryon
- Elizabeth Perkins as Alcmene
- Leeanna Walsman as Megara
- Kristian Schmid as King Eurystheus
- John Bach as King Creon, father of Megara
- Luke Ford as Iphicles
- Jamie Croft as Young Hercules
- André de Vanny as Young Iphicles
- Trent Sullivan as Hyllus, son of Hercules and Deianeira
- Susan Lay as Iole, daughter of Eurystheus and Megara
- Robert Taylor as Chiron
- Tyler Mane as Antaeus
- Kim Coates as Tiresias
- Rachael Taylor as Nemean lion / Sphinx
- William Snow as King Theseus
- Peter McCauley as Nestor
- Madeleine West as Hippolyta

== Production ==
Production on Hercules began on August 23, 2004, with shooting taking place in New Zealand a budget exceeding $20 million. Paul Telfer, Timothy Dalton, Leelee Sobieski, and Sean Astin among the first to be cast.

== Release ==
Hercules premiered on NBC on May 16, 2005.

== See also ==
- List of films featuring Hercules
- List of historical drama films
- Greek mythology in popular culture
