= Dawn Klingberg =

Australian actress

- Born: 1937
- Died: 2023 (aged 85–86)
- Other names: Dawn Klingburg; Dawn Clinberg
- Occupation: Actress
- Years active: 1959–2023

Dawn Klingberg (1937 – 2023) was an Australian actress known for her roles in Prisoner: Cell Block H, the Crone in BeastMaster, and her final screen role as the Corpse Minder in Furiosa: A Mad Max Saga.

== Career ==
Before landing her first screen role, Klingberg was a fashion designer of the Clementine label and active in Australian theatre in Adelaide portraying Angela in Barry Pree's A Fox in the Night (1959), and in Melbourne in 1963, portraying Maggie in Cat on a Hot Tin Roof with Terence Donovan as Brick.

Early screen appearances include roles on the Australian series Homicide (1964) and Prisoner (1979–85), and the theatrical film Kostas (1979).

In the 1980s Kingberg appears in the theatrical films Lonely Hearts (1982), Man of Flowers (1983), and Cactus (1986), and a role on the television series Special Squad (1984).

During the 1990s her television appearances include Neighbours (1990–2013), Phoenix (1993), Halifax F.P. (1995), Blue Heelers (1997–2004), Sir Arthur Conan Doyle's The Lost World (1999, 2000), the miniseries Snowy (1993) and the made-for-television film The Ripper (1997). She also appeared in the 1991 feature film A Woman's Tale.

Klingberg remained active into the 2000s. In 2001, she is credited as Dawn Klingburg in BeastMaster, portraying a fortune telling crone named Olana, who predicts Dar's death in the season three episode, "Destiny." Other television series guest roles include City Homicide (2007), Bed of Roses (2010), and Outland (2012), the television film Dogwoman: A Grrrl's Best Friend (2000), and the miniseries Childhood's End (2015). Feature films include Innocence (2000), Till Human Voices Wake Us (2002), One Perfect Day (2004), the horror films Damned by Dawn and Prey (both in 2009), Force of Destiny (2015), and in 2020 she appeared in both The Very Excellent Mr. Dundee and The Dry.

Her final screen appearance was the role of Corpse Minder in Furiosa: A Mad Max Saga, released posthumously in 2024.

== Filmography ==
=== Film ===
- 1979: Kostas – Landlady
- 1982: Lonely Hearts – Flower Seller
- 1983: Man of Flowers – Cleaning Lady
- 1986: Cactus – Pedestrian
- 1991: A Woman's Tale – Don's Wife
- 2000: Innocence – Restaurant Owner
- 2002: Till Human Voices Wake Us – Mrs. Sarks
- 2004: One Perfect Day – Bag Lady
- 2009: Damned by Dawn – Nana O'Neill
- 2009: Prey – Kora
- 2015: Force of Destiny – Visitor
- 2017: Deep Storage (short) – Millie
- 2020: The Very Excellent Mr. Dundee – Old Lady Trolley
- 2020: The Dry – Gran
- 2024: Furiosa: A Mad Max Saga – Corpse Minder (final screen role)

=== Television ===
Dawn Klingberg television credits
Year	Title	Role	Notes	Ref.
1964–1966	Homicide	Edna Malone / Dawn Kirby / Beryl Dunn	3 episodes	
1979–1985	Prisoner: Cell Block H	Woman / Officer Edwards (uncredited) / Ellen / Jen / Mrs. Graham	20 episodes	
1984	Special Squad	Unknown	Episode: "Until Death"	
1990–2013	Neighbours	Vera Carmichael / Nell Woodrow / Ingrid Farah	4 episodes	
1993	Snowy	Old Woman (as Dawn Clinberg)	TV miniseries	
1993	Phoenix	Yvonne	1 episode	
1995	Halifax F.P.	Homeless Woman	Episode: "The Feeding"	
1997	The Ripper	Old woman	TV movie	
1997–2004	Blue Heelers	Mrs. Mundy / Gwen Kinnear / Grandma Kenny	3 episodes	
1998	SeaChange	Mrs. Cynthia Fitzwalter	1 episode	
1998	State Coroner	Gwen Smith	1 episode	
1998	Stingers	Pearl Gallagher	1 episode	
1999, 2000	The Lost World	Old Woman / Woman	2 episodes	
2000	Dogwoman: A Grrrl's Best Friend	Pearl	TV movie	
2001	BeastMaster	Crone (as Dawn Klingburg)	Episode: "Destiny" (S3.E8)	
2007	City Homicide	Sharon Finnegan	Episode: "The Ripe Fruits In The Garden"	
2010	Bed of Roses	Evelyn Longbottom	1 episode	
2012	Outland	Mrs. Reynolds	1 episode	
2015	Childhood's End	Elderly Nun	TV miniseries	
