= André de Vanny =

Australian actor (born 1984)

André De Vanny
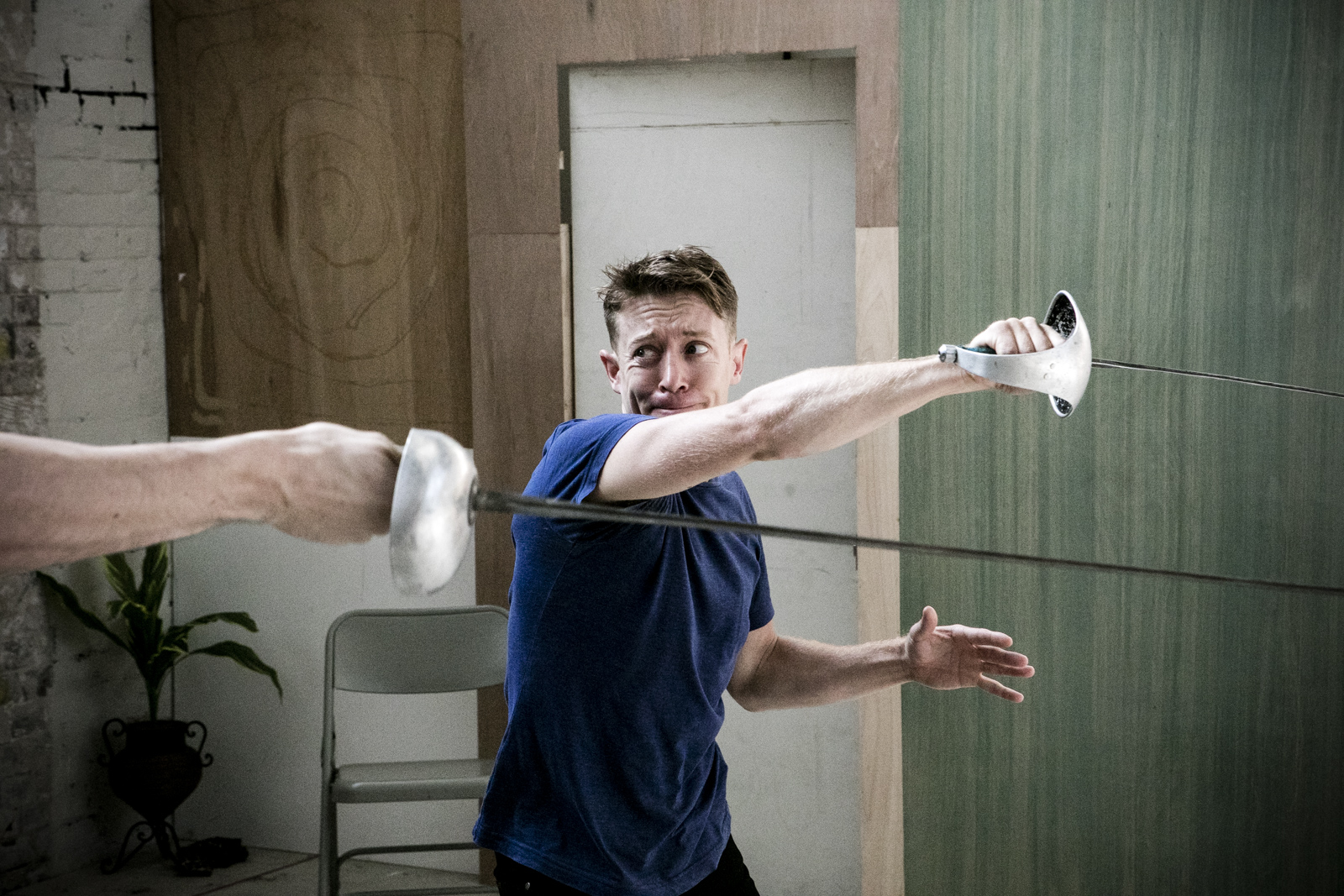
- De Vanny in 2017
- Born: 14 September 1984 (age 41); Melbourne, Australia
- Years active: 2003–present
- Known for: Toby Johnson in Wicked Science

André Guy Foreman de Vanny (born 14 September 1984) is an Australian actor, who starred in the television series Wicked Science and theatre production Swansong.

== Filmography ==
=== Film ===
Year	Title	Role	Type
2003	A Closer Walk	Joshua Tranter	TV movie
2005	Hating Alison Ashley	Tom	Feature film
2008	Nice Shootin' Cowboy	Will	Short film

=== Television ===
Year	Title	Role	Type
2003	Wicked Science	Toby Johnson	TV series, 52 episodes
2003	Blue Heelers	Marky Emmett	TV series, 1 episode: "Losing the Road"
2003	MDA	Joshua Tranter	TV series, 1 episode
2004	Salem's Lot	Danny Glick	TV miniseries
2005	Swing	Noah	
2005	Hercules	Young Iphicles	TV miniseries
2006	Nightmares and Dreamscapes: From the Stories of Stephen King	Skater Boy	TV miniseries, episode: "You Know They Got a Hell of a Band"
2008	Under a Red Moon	Zach	
2008	Canal Road	Danny Havesco	TV series
2009	Rush	Terry 'Flea' Hartigan	TV series
2010	The Pacific	Crazy Marine	TV miniseries
2014	The Flamin' Thongs	Jevin (voice)	Animated TV series
2023	Bay of Fires	Jason	TV series

== Theatre ==
Year	Title	Role	Type
2013	War Horse	Private David Taylor	Australian tour with National Theatre of London
2015	Of Mice and Men	Curley	Seymour Centre
2015	Glory Dazed	Ray	Melbourne with Red Stitch Theatre Company; Won Green Room Award for Best Male Actor in a main stage play
2018	Swansong	Austin 'Occi' Byrne	Theatre Row with Wolf Productions
	Red	Ken	Melbourne Theatre Company
2019	33 Variations	Anton Schindler	Comedy Theatre, Melbourne
