= List of The Lost World episodes =

This is a list of episodes for the television series Sir Arthur Conan Doyle's The Lost World.

== Series overview ==
Season	Episodes	Originally released	
Season	Episodes	First released	Last released
1	22	April 3, 1999	May 20, 2000
2	22	October 7, 2000	May 26, 2001
3	22	October 20, 2001	May 13, 2002

== Episodes ==
=== Season 1 (1999–2000) ===
No. overall	No. in season	Title	Directed by	Written by	Original release date
1	1	"The Journey Begins"	Richard Franklin	Jim Henshaw & Peter Mohan	April 3, 1999
Professor George Challenger and a group of adventurers embark on an expedition to the Amazon, hoping to prove the existence of dinosaurs on an isolated plateau, located in the dense Amazon jungle. When their hot air balloon leaves them stranded atop the plateau, they must put their trust in a jungle girl to save them from the dangerous predators that inhabit it. Note: Part 1 of the Pilot Movie
2	2	"Stranded"	Richard Franklin	Jim Henshaw & Peter Mohan	April 3, 1999
As a way to get off the plateau, Marguerite tries to make a deal with the chief of a local tribe, in which Veronica will marry the chief, something she wants no part of. Things do not go as planned, and the explorers must now face a variety of threats to save their own lives. Note: Part 2 of the Pilot Movie
3	3	"More Than Human"	Colin Budds	James Thorpe	October 2, 1999
After being forced into a whirlpool by a Tyrannosaurus, the explorers end up in the midst of a new culture, where humanoid lizards rule and humans are their slaves. The group must find a way to escape the cold-blooded captors and their evil leader Tribune.
4	4	"Nectar"	Colin Budds	Durnford King	October 9, 1999
After Summerlee is stung by a giant bee, the explorers search for an antidote, which can only be found in the bee's gigantic hive.
5	5	"Cave of Fear"	Catherine Millar	Alison Lea Bingeman	October 16, 1999
As Roxton and Marguerite venture into a cave to rescue Challenger, they discover that this is no ordinary cave. Hallucinogenic gases in the cave cause memories of their past mistakes to haunt them. As Summerlee searches for them, both come nearer and nearer to ending their lives.
6	6	"Salvation"	Richard Franklin	Catherine Porciuncula	October 23, 1999
When Challenger, Veronica, and Summerlee save a girl from drowning using CPR, Tolmac, part of the Christec people, declares Summerlee a witch for bringing the girl back from the dead. The Christecs have combined Catholicism and Aztec religions, with a Conquistador Inquisition feel, to form their own theocracy. As Veronica escapes to summon help from the others, Challenger takes on the role of Summerlee's lawyer ~ if found guilty, both men will be burned at the stake.
7	7	"Blood Lust"	Richard Franklin	James Thorpe	October 30, 1999
The explorers race against time to save Roxton's life after a series of events cause him to become a vampire.
8	8	"Out of Time"	Catherine Millar	Guy Mullally	November 6, 1999
Roxton, Marguerite and Malone are mapping a series of caves, trying to find one that leads off the plateau, when a fog begins to fill the air around them. Once the fog clears they find themselves surrounded by Druids who swarm over Marguerite. The Druids reveal to Marguerite that her fate is to fulfill an ancient prophecy. What it means, she must discover for herself, but it involves retrieving a sacred gemstone. She, along with Roxton and Malone, must go through several obstacles like headhunters and a leap of faith to accomplish Marguerite's task. Meanwhile, Veronica discovers an abandoned baby in the jungle, whom she looks after, much to the dismay of Challenger.
9	9	"Paradise Found"	Michael Pattinson	Morrie Ruvinsky	November 13, 1999
An aged guide who brought Veronica's parents to the Lost World years ago, dies in Veronica's arms, singing "Ode to Joy," leading Veronica and the explorers to seek out a hidden paradise, where Veronica suspects her parents might be.
10	10	"The Beast Within"	Catherine Millar	Scott Kraft	November 20, 1999
Out in the jungle, Malone is hit in the neck with a poisoned dart and is killed. A shaman named Lento, heals him and Malone is brought back to life, but due to this, Lento has been driven mad. He is sentenced to death by his village, but Malone rescues him. Summerlee is kept captive in Lento's place and will die unless Roxton, Malone, and Challenger can capture Lento. Lento leads them on a chase, having booby-trapped the jungle. Meanwhile, back at the treehouse, Veronica and Marguerite have had a huge fight, and wind up down an old well.
11	11	"Creatures of the Dark"	Colin Budds	Gilbert Shilton	November 27, 1999
Challenger, Veronica, Malone and Marguerite are out tracking a stream, when they run into a group of Vantu headhunters. Fearing for their lives, the run into an overgrown cave opening. Once inside, they discover it is man-made mine shaft. There is a cave in, in which Veronica escapes, but the others are trapped inside. They are saved by Garza, part of a tribe banished to the mine by a plague, and led by a blind little boy known as The Oracle, who declares the explorers shall remain underground forever. On the outside, Veronica manages to get Roxton and Summerlee from the treehouse, but they meet up with the Vantu again, who are not easily persuaded to let them rescue the others from their mountain prison.
12	12	"Tribute"	Colin Budds	Michael Teversham	January 15, 2000
When Roxton saves Tayra of the Tinta people from a Hikari warrior who is chasing her, he learns that Tayra was part of a tribute that the Tinta pay the Hikari to ensure they can live in peace. Roxton, Veronica, and Challenger convince the Tinta they can stop the tribute and begin teaching them to fight. The Tinta must now fight the Hikari for their freedom, with the help of the explorers. Back at the treehouse, Malone, Marguerite, and Summerlee are taken prisoner by a World War I pilot, Hans Dressler, who still thinks WWI is going on, and who shares a mysterious past with Marguerite.
13	13	"Absolute Power"	Ian Gilmour	Frank Encarnacao	January 22, 2000
Our adventurers find the ruins of an ancient temple and at its center, Challenger is amazed to find the crude etching of an atom. Curious to unlock the mystery, Challenger places a nearby crystal sphere into the "keyhole" of the atom. Suddenly a blinding white light engulfs Challenger, leaving him near death. As Challenger's friends fight to save his life, we see an alternate reality, where Challenger emerges from the light unscathed and with extraordinary powers. When the vicious Dirkon and his band of Slavers kidnap Veronica, Challenger easily defeats them. Unfortunately, after this Challenger's arrogance increases tenfold with his powers with murderous results. With Challenger near death in one world, and his friends dying in the other, the two worlds begin a collision course with destiny.
14	14	"Camelot"	Colin Budds	James Thorpe	January 29, 2000
When Marguerite catches the eye of fourteen-year-old boy-king Gawain, he decides that she should be his bride and she is left with the choice to either marry him or die. Veronica fetches Malone and Roxton to try to free Marguerite and before long, they become embroiled in a power struggle between Gawain and Vordred, Gawain's Grand Vizier who wants to kill the boy-king and seize the throne for himself. While Marguerite tries to protect Gawain from Vordred, Roxton and Malone are sent on a quest to slay a T-Rex and events culminate with Roxton engaging in joust with Vordred to decide the fate of the Kingdom.
15	15	"Unnatural Selection"	Catherine Millar	Kris Dobkin	February 5, 2000
The discovery that one of Challenger's old friends from London is living on the plateau with his daughter causes Challenger some concern considering he was at the girl's funeral fifteen years ago. Furthermore, Veronica's disappearance coupled with encounters with armed, intelligent ape men, lead Roxton and Challenger to uncover the secret genetic experimentation being carried out by Dr. Hargrove. Meanwhile, a faint image in a photograph helps Summerlee, Marguerite and Malone locate an elderly woman, who claims to be an exiled fairy queen, who may have access to a radio transmitter, however she is only willing to divulge its location in exchange for help in breaking her curse, all she requires is a few drops of blood from a virgin.
16	16	"Time After Time"	Michael Offer	Joseph Mallozzi & Paul Mullie	February 12, 2000
While out hunting with Veronica, Roxton accidentally shoots a young woman who appears suddenly in a flash of light. Returning to the treehouse, Summerlee helps Roxton nurse her back to health. Meanwhile, Marguerite, Malone, and Challenger discover a tablet that points to a possible way off the plateau. After making their way to some ancient ruins, the trio are attacked by armed warriors but a stranger arrives to help fend off the attackers. As events play out for the two groups, the two mysterious new arrivals tell separate tales of what they are doing on the plateau. They both purport to be from the future and Marguerite is the focus for each of them, one wants her dead to stop her unleashing a deadly plague, while the other wants to ensure she returns to London.
17	17	"Prodigal Father"	Colin Budds	David Tynan	February 19, 2000
Roxton, Malone, and Marguerite rescue a man from certain death, and soon make the startling realization that the man is Tom Layton, Veronica's long-lost father, who has escaped his life as a slave working in the mines and is now on running from Kartas, a merciless bounty hunter who is stalking him. The group return to the tree house where Veronica is reunited with her father, but is this man really who he appears to be?
18	18	"Birthright"	Catherine Millar	Frank Encarnacao	February 26, 2000
Deep in the jungle, Marguerite, Challenger and Malone come upon a mummified corpse. Surprised when it shows signs of life, they learn the would-be corpse, Ramses, is Egyptian royalty. He tells a story about how his throne has been stolen from him by his sister, Nefertiti. After agreeing to help him regain the throne, the three discover there is more to the dispute than Ramses is revealing. He blinds his sister, and leaves her to die. Marguerite, Challenger and Malone help her escape. The explorers must now come up with a plan to dethrone Ramses and give Nefertiti control again. Meanwhile, Summerlee is pursued by a T-Rex after she mistakenly believes him responsible for the death of her babies. Roxton and Veronica must help their friend or die with him as a T-Rex meal.
19	19	"Resurrection"	Colin Budds	James Thorpe	March 4, 2000
After days of searching the mountains for a pass off the plateau, Roxton and Marguerite are camped for the night when they are taken by surprise by Norse warriors. Roxton is run through with a sword by the leader, Ursula. As he sinks to his knees, Marguerite is hauled off by the raiders. Near death, Roxton is visited by a mystical young boy named Osric, who offers a deal. Osric will restore Roxton's life so he can save Marguerite. However, as a deal, Roxton must murder Bergen, an old man with a long-standing hold over the boy's manipulative intentions. Roxton refuses to kill the old man, but Osric has many deadly ways to get what he wants. Meanwhile, Malone and Veronica must defend their Treehouse from a band of cutthroats who will stop at nothing to take it from them.
20	20	"The Chosen One"	Michael Offer	Jon Cowan	April 22, 2000
Roxton is bestowed with the honor of safely ensuring the delivery of a young leader and a slain man's quarterstaff to their final destination. Along the way, the group must battle the evil Goths who seek destroy the boy's tribe, and Roxton finds himself taking a personal interest in seeing that the boy fulfill his destiny as the Saviour of his people. Meanwhile, back at the Treehouse, Malone finds himself falling for Kaya, a beautiful young woman whose sudden appearance has Veronica struggling with more than her own jealousy.
21	21	"Prophecy"	Catherine Millar	Scott Kraft	May 13, 2000
When the explorers rescue a fortune teller from her runaway horses, she tells them their future, which begins to come true little by little, but in a different way than they expect. Meanwhile Challenger and Summerlee collect some prehistoric plants, however, they are being hunted by pack of smart raptors waiting for them to run out of ammo as they dodge and hide while they try to get to the balloon.
22	22	"Barbarians At The Gate"	Catherine Millar	James Thorpe	May 20, 2000
The explorers are caught in the middle of a raging war between Tribune, who now holds gunpowder, and Drakul, the leader of a barbaric tribe. One of the explorers will be lost, possibly forever, when this battle reaches its peak.

=== Season 2 (2000–2001) ===
No. overall	No. in season	Title	Directed by	Written by	Original release date
23	1	"All or Nothing"	Colin Budds	Charles Lazer	October 7, 2000
On a bridge spanning a deep gorge, a fierce battle unfolds with Drakul's raiders. Marguerite and Veronica watch as Summerlee is hit. Tribune, betrayed by Drakul, hurls a bomb that destroys the bridge...throwing the men into the river far below. Veronica clings to the hope that her friends have survived and searches for them with Marguerite. Once reunited, they discover that Tribune has saved Roxton's life and demands a favor in return. Since they need a boat to return home, they follow Tribune to a run-down fishing village – where he disappears. A beautiful prostitute named Raina informs them that Nemak has enslaved the town. When our gang clashes with Nemak and his goons, they are thrown into jail.
24	2	"Amazons"	Michael Offer	David Barlow	October 14, 2000
While looking for a way off the plateau, Roxton, Malone, and Challenger save an Amazon woman from an attacking Deinonychus. Challenger is injured in the melee and the three are invited back to the Amazon's camp where they are welcomed with open arms. While the Amazons celebrate by the light of a full moon, the men happily learn that it is breeding time, and they have been chosen as studs. By the time they realize they will die as soon as they have served their purpose, it may be too late to save themselves.
25	3	"Tourist Season"	Richard Franklin & Darryl Sheen	Guy Mullally	October 21, 2000
Challenger is trying to harness the energy of the wind to generate electric power for the tree house when a storm erupts and a gigantic ball of lightning strikes Challenger's windmill. In the ensuing silence, the sputtering sound of a small engine is heard, and a helicopter appears in the distant sky. It draws nearer and lands in the clearing - all on board, a family of 20th century tourists and their pilot, survive. As Challenger and the others marvel at the new arrivals, Marguerite tries to come up with a way to escape the plateau in the helicopter, at the expense of the others if need be. Meanwhile, a hostile tribe has also seen the smoking helicopter land and want to make it theirs, resorting to a kidnapping as a means of achieving that goal.
26	4	"Stone Cold"	Michael Offer	Judith Reeves-Stevens & Garfield Reeves-Stevens	October 28, 2000
While mapping an unexplored valley, Roxton is surprised by a terrified young woman, who after uttering an enigmatic warning, dies in Marguerite's arms. Roxton, Marguerite, and Malone head toward an ominous castle when a sudden rainstorm forces them to seek shelter. There, under a mysterious influence, the three are led to separate rooms where they each find opulent evening wear of the same vintage as that worn by the young woman. Marguerite and the two men begin to take on new personalities, eerily re-enacting a romantic triangle of intrigue, with Marguerite playing Roxton against Malone as both men compete for her attention. Meanwhile Challenger and Veronica similarly find themselves at the castle, where they are welcomed by Roxton, Marguerite, and Malone, all strangely possessed by the spirit-wearers.
27	5	"Divine Right"	Colin Budds	Tony Di Franco	November 4, 2000
A riderless horse approaches our explorers, as if on a mission. When Roxton saddles up, the horse carries him to a mountain tribe, who welcome him as their king. Roxton tries to decline, but when the royal advisor, Balar, tells him that if he's an imposter; he shall die, Roxton reconsiders. Using the horse, Roxton tries to warn his friends. Balar has the horse followed and they are captured. One of the customs of the tribe is to sacrifice a virgin to appease a monstrous dragon, but Roxton saves the young woman and steps right into Balar's trap. The only way to stop the dragon now is for the rightful king to hunt it down and kill it.
28	6	"Skin Deep"	Colin Budds	Story by : Will Dixon & Damian Kindler; Teleplay by : David Wolkove	November 11, 2000
When Marguerite starts being nice to everyone, they wonder what she is up to. Even when pushed to find out why she is acting this way, she maintains her uncharacteristic serenity. In the jungle, Roxton and Veronica are attacked by a dinosaur that after giving them a huge scare, starts to move very clumsily, giving them a chance to escape. We learn that an alien invader, who could not control the dinosaur's huge body, occupied it. We also learn that Marguerite's body has been possessed when she drops her spoon into a vat of boiling water and plunges her arm in to retrieve it – with no ill effect. We discover that the Alien Invaders are skeletons that our heroes have to fight.
29	7	"London Calling"	Michael Offer	Judith Reeves-Stevens & Garfield Reeves-Stevens	November 18, 2000
Our adventurers recover an ancient map showing the escape route from the Lost World. Knowing they will face sceptics in the scientific world to which they shall return, Challenger and Malone capture a T-Rex egg to take with them. Veronica cannot share their joy, however, for she must continue her search for her long lost parents. Malone's dreams of successfully returning to his beautiful fiancée in London appear to come true. But is this what he really wants?
30	8	"The Prisoner"	Richard Franklin	Guy Mullally	November 25, 2000
A mysterious old woman, a shape-shifter, appears to Veronica, convincing her that her lost parents are safe in El Dorado. The woman gives her the directions to its entrance in a rock wall, and warns that she must tell no one and can never return. When Veronica unwittingly releases a savage giant from captivity, Marguerite and the others must use all their talents to subdue him again.
31	9	"The Games"	Michael Offer	Charles Lazer	January 20, 2001
Empress Centuria has ordered her Lizardmen to hunt and kill Tribune, who flees to the treehouse for help. They track him there and overwhelm our heroes. Malone, Marguerite and Roxton are taken prisoner along with Tribune and brought back to Centuria's city. Malone, posing as Professor Challenger, is ordered to make gunpowder, while Roxton and Tribune are sent to the gladiators' dungeon.
32	10	"The Source"	Michael Pattinson	Scott Kraft	January 27, 2001
The Lost World is in the grip of a crippling drought. Our adventurers are saved from a pack of hungry Deinonychus by a magnificent young woman who begs them to escort her to her pueblo. She confesses that she is a survivor of the original colony, which had discovered the Fountain of Youth. Her supply is diminishing, however, and she must return to the Fountain cave, or die. Marguerite, with visions of eternal youth and wealth, leads the others after Ana.
33	11	"Trophies"	Pino Amenta	Richard Oleksiak	February 3, 2001
The Lost World is shattered by gunfire as trophy hunters try to capture a Troglodyte child. Veronica swings through the jungle to save him, and becomes the hunters' new target. She escapes to the Treehouse to warn her friends just ahead of the hunters. One of the hunters declares that he has been commissioned to locate the Challenger expedition and help them return to England. Despite Veronica's warnings, and Marguerite's suspicions, the hunters are welcomed and set up camp nearby.
34	12	"Voodoo Queen"	Colin Budds	Guy Mullally	February 10, 2001
As mysterious drums sound through the jungle, Roxton is stalked and seduced by a beautiful woman, Danielle, who tells a harrowing tale of Trogs attacking and taking over her village. Seeking refuge at the Treehouse, she manages to charm the men but arouses the women's suspicions. Their mistrust is justified when Danielle makes a voodoo doll in Roxton's image and lures him back to her village, where it turns out, she is the one who controls the Trogs and an army of zombies. When the others discover that Roxton has been enslaved, they quickly devise a plan to infiltrate the village and rescue him.
35	13	"The Guardian"	Michael Pattinson	Stacey Kaser	February 17, 2001
Challenger is knocked unconscious by a falling pig trap while searching for medicinal herbs. The three young hunters who set the trap drag him back to their hidden village. Veronica and Marguerite follow the hunters' tracks and make their way past the jungle defense into the village, populated by a group of young orphans. They learn that the village is protected by an enormous plant that emits a deadly gas when disturbed and must be fed fresh meat daily. While the trio attempt to find a way out of the village, the tribe seizes Challenger and pushes him toward the plant's jaws. Will Challenger be the plant's next meal?
36	14	"Under Pressure"	Pino Amenta	Judith Reeves-Stevens & Garfield Reeves-Stevens	February 24, 2001
The explorers have a strange guest at the Treehouse who impresses Challenger with his knowledge of geology. Meanwhile something attacks Challenger's electrostatic accumulator. The explorers chase after a group of underground dwellers whom they believe to be the culprits. Their guest turns out to be one of them, and the explorers are soon taken hostage. It turns out that the underground dwellers need Challenger's scientific expertise to help them evolve above ground.
37	15	"The Outlaw"	Michael Offer	Guy Mullally	March 3, 2001
Roxton and Marguerite are out looking for a way off the plateau when they discover a promising looking crevice. Once through, they discover an old English village where they meet a masked woman who has just robbed the local pub. She drops her bag of spoils in front of the two explorers and vanishes. Roxton and Marguerite enter the pub in an effort to find the rightful owners of the loot, when they are promptly arrested by the local prosecutor. When Roxton tries to escape, he is shot!
38	16	"Quality of Mercy"	Ian Gilmour	John Sheppard	March 10, 2001
Veronica and Malone are captured by an angry mob who need slaves to mine their quarry. They soon discover that their fellow prisoners are not human; they are machines who are helping aliens repair their spaceship. Will the aliens discover that our heroes are human?!
39	17	"Mark of the Beast"	Michael Pattinson	Scott Kraft	April 21, 2001
Roxton and Marguerite return to the treehouse to find it raided by a monkey. They follow the monkey to a cave where they find an amulet that leaves a mark of a dinosaur skull on their hands. Those infected with the mark soon begin to morph into their "animal" selves.
40	18	"Survivors"	Ian Gilmour	Judith Reeves-Stevens & Garfield Reeves-Stevens	April 28, 2001
Challenger and Marguerite discover an ancient Temple whose entrance is guarded by a carving of three armed warriors. When Marguerite falls into a pit of spikes, Challenger must leave her, to get help. As he leaves, the Guardians come to life. While Marguerite lies bleeding, she hallucinates. As Challenger is returning with the others, the Guardians attack them with invincible strength, but stop suddenly when they see Malone bleeding from a chest wound. While Veronica takes Malone home, the others hurry to the temple. When Roxton and Challenger reach her, Marguerite is baffled when they can see her hallucination, Adrienne. Following Adrienne's claims there is an exit from the plateau via the Temple, Challenger follows her map to the Temple's altar where he is confronted by William Maple White, a dead colleague whose journals had led him to the Lost World.
41	19	"The Pirate's Curse"	Catherine Millar	Guy Mullally	May 5, 2001
Marguerite and Roxton are enjoying an intimate moment, when suddenly the earth moves! They find themselves sprawled in the bottom of a pit, with a pirate's skeleton and his cursed treasure chest filled with a fortune in booty. Unimpressed by a little curse, Marguerite takes it to the Treehouse. Challenger and Malone find the pirate's journal, and decide to unravel his story. Traveling to the described inland sea, they are ambushed by pirate descendant Pappin, who seizes the journal. He sends his men to find the treasure, then shackles Malone in a tidal cave, leaving Challenger tied up in his shack.
42	20	"The Visitor"	Colin Budds	Guy Mullally	May 12, 2001
When Malone is slashed by a beast in the jungle, he shoots wildly. While looking for the animal, he and Veronica come across Danu, her childhood sweetheart, wounded, and warning them of the danger from this beast. Later that night, the team is disturbed by a howling animal, and discovers Danu gone and Malone feverish. Marguerite stays to nurse Malone, the others search for Danu, hoping to learn more about Malone's condition. Veronica leads them to his village, where only a witchdoctor and a few warriors armed with silver-tipped weapons, remain. The witchdoctor tells them that Danu has become a werewolf and must be killed by silver or fire, as there is no cure. She gives Veronica a potion to delay the onset of Malone's transformation, then sends Challenger and Roxton to the Valley of Shadows where the werewolves live. Danu, wanting to transform Veronica to a werewolf like him, drives her towards the Valley of Shadows.
43	21	"A Man of Vision"	Pino Amenta	Guy Mullally	May 19, 2001
During a powerful thunderstorm on the plateau, all five of our heroes experience dreams and visions of their "lost" colleague, Summerlee, who had disappeared into a raging waterfall and presumed dead. Malone sets off after this ghost, and Challenger Marguerite and Roxton follow Ned. The three are ambushed by cannibals who fancy Marguerite's arm for an aperitif. Roxton and Challenger break free and save her, and then the three resume their hunt for Malone, only to be trapped by a hungry T-Rex. Ned, meanwhile, has fallen and knocked himself out. He regains consciousness, concussed and thirsty, and follows Summerlee's ghost along a dry riverbed. He stumbles and twists his ankle, but still hobbles on. Summerlee appears to be leading him to the now dry waterfall where he was last seen.
44	22	"Into the Fire"	Michael Pattinson	Judith Reeves-Stevens & Garfield Reeves-Stevens	May 26, 2001
Our heroes are astonished to see a British Navy dirigible flying low over their plateau. Malone, working away from the rest, is close enough to catch the last rung of its boarding ladder and clambers aboard. He finds the airship damaged and without crew, but as he opens a logbook, Capt. Askwith appears, and knocks Malone unconscious. As the airship flies beyond view, the others hear screams from a T-Rex nest. Luring the dinosaur away, they rescue, not Malone, as they expected, but Askwith! He claims not to have seen Malone. Marguerite is quite taken by him, and offers to bring him back to the Treehouse to recover. Roxton, a little jealous, and very suspicious, accompanies them, as Challenger and Veronica follow the airship. They locate it in foothills nearby, and discover that the damage is not too serious, and enough fuel for three days flight off the plateau.

=== Season 3 (2001–2002) ===
No. overall	No. in season	Title	Directed by	Written by	Original release date
45	1	"Out of the Blue"	Michael Pattinson	Judith Reeves-Stevens & Garfield Reeves-Stevens	October 20, 2001
There's no escape for the Challenger Expedition when Captain Askwith's mysterious airship explodes in a fiery crash. But moments later, when Challenger, Roxton, and Marguerite appear on a British air station in 1915 – on the same day the airship was launched on its final mission – they realize they truly have taken the place of the captain's original crew. After two years of struggling to escape the Plateau, Challenger and his friends must now fight to return to it by once again taking flight on the doomed dirigible. At the same time, Veronica appears on the Plateau, and in a shocking confrontation with Captain Askwith, realizes she has her own mission to complete: pursue Askwith and somehow return him to his ship.
46	2	"The Travelers"	Michael Offer	Guy Mullally	October 27, 2001
While searching for the missing Malone, Marguerite is saved from a cannibal attack by a dashing trio of bandits. Their leader, the elegant Francois Locke, invites her to join his band of thieves. Marguerite declines his offer, only to be presented with proof that Locke can give her what she desires most – a way off the Plateau. Meanwhile, as Challenger, Roxton, and Veronica search for Marguerite, they discover evidence that the bandits are something other than human. Even worse, they receive a ransom note from them, demanding Marguerite's jewels in exchange for her release. But when they deliver the ransom, they're shocked to see that Marguerite isn't a prisoner at all – she appears to have joined Locke's group!
47	3	"Eye for an Eye"	Geoffrey Nottage	Richard Oleksiak & Guy Mullally	November 3, 2001
While exploring a mysterious dinosaur bone yard, Roxton is attacked by a charging Triceratops and kills it, not out of necessity but in anger. However, the bone yard is actually a sacred animal burial ground, protected by a beautiful, half-human, half-dinosaur guardian named Oseena. To punish Roxton for his crime, Oseena curses him to become the prey in a hunt that will end only with his death.
48	4	"True Spirit"	Esben Storm	Judith Reeves-Stevens & Garfield Reeves-Stevens	November 10, 2001
An unsettling dream and a ghostly encounter convince Veronica that Malone is trapped in the spirit realm and needs her help to escape. At the same time, Assai and Challenger investigate a mysterious symbol burned into a field of grass, which Assai identifies as the mark of Saros, a bloodthirsty warlord who was overthrown by the Zanga and died swearing to return from the grave to wreak vengeance on the living.
49	5	"The Knife"	Michael Offer	Guy Mullally	November 17, 2001
When Malone finds a knife, he is transported back to the East End of London in 1888, the scene of Jack the Ripper's brutal murders. In the nightmare of his visions, Malone sees his friends playing key roles in the crimes, both as conspirators and victims.
50	6	"Fire In The Sky"	Michael Pattinson	Richard Oleksiak & Guy Mullally	November 24, 2001
Challenger, Malone and Veronica are exploring ruins on a riverbank, when a man stumbles out of the jungle in a hail of deadly arrows. Malone drags the wounded man to safety, who dies in their arms issuing a cryptic message to find a man named Pierson Rice. Challenger recognizes the name as that of a vain glorious hunter whom Roxton once held in high regard. The trio send a message to Roxton and Marguerite, then hurry on in search of Rice. Roxton is disgusted to learn that his one-time hero may be alive and well.
51	7	"Dead Man's Hill"	Catherine Millar	Nick Jacobs, Judith Reeves-Stevens & Garfield Reeves-Stevens	December 1, 2001
When Roxton happens upon a hangman's noose dangling from a lonely tree in the jungle, he's suddenly transported back to the American West where he finds himself at the end of the rope. Facing him is Challenger, but in this world he's known as Sheriff Jack Challenger, a cruel lawman who neither recognizes Roxton nor listens to his plea of innocence. Saved by a rancher's widow, Roxton begins a strange journey to clear his name and find his way back to the Lost World. Along the way he runs into all of his friends but none of them recognize him – Malone is a cold-hearted gunslinger, Veronica runs the local saloon and trading post, and Marguerite is the beautiful widow who saved Roxton's life. As Roxton struggles to make sense of it all, he is drawn to a final showdown in the saloon, where he must face his friends in a deadly shootout.
52	8	"Hollow Victory"	Michael Offer	Judith Reeves-Stevens & Garfield Reeves-Stevens	December 8, 2001
Challenger develops a new way to create lift in the balloon. All go along for a test flight, but the balloon is drawn into violent turbulence then crash-lands inside the vast caldera of an extinct volcano where our heroes find themselves trapped in a world beneath the earth's surface. With the balloon damaged and the supply of iron lost, our heroes can only survive for a matter of days in this hot and hostile environment.
53	9	"A Witch's Calling"	Michael Pattinson	Guy Mullally	January 12, 2002
When a powerful witch named Dame Alice feels threatened by Challenger's science, she calls upon her two beautiful acolytes to help undo his power. In order to earn full witchhood, the two must lure Challenger's "guards" – Roxton and Malone – to the witch's castle while she goes head to head with the "wizard" – Challenger – herself. While the two young witches distract Roxton and Malone, Dame Alice visits the Treehouse for a visit. In spite of Marguerite's protests and warnings, Challenger is intrigued by the witch's power and too easily lowers his guard. When Dame Alice sabotages Challenger's newest invention and almost kills him, it is only Marguerite's quick thinking that saves the scientist from his own folly. But in the end it is not Challenger's life that is in danger, but the lives of Roxton and Malone….
54	10	"Brothers In Arms"	Michael Offer	Judith Reeves-Stevens & Garfield Reeves-Stevens	January 19, 2002
When Keeran Raiders attack, a deadly poison dart forces Malone to relive a long-suppressed memory-his baptism of fire as a battlefield correspondent in World War I. Caught up in this nightmarish hallucination, Malone is once again an untried reporter cut off from Allied lines when an enemy advance pushes deep into No Man's Land. When the three battle-weary British soldiers who've been assigned to escort him are picked off by enemy action, the young reporter who's never fired a gun must take up arms to save his own life and the life of a wounded sergeant.
55	11	"Ice Age"	Michael Carson	Shane Brennan & Guy Mullally	January 26, 2002
When a blindingly bright meteor strikes the Plateau, Challenger, Roxton, and Marguerite set out to investigate the impact site. But the closer they get, the colder the temperature becomes. As the explorers turn back, they discover what appears to be a victim of the intense cold – a beautiful, blue-skinned woman, unconscious and nearly frozen. To save her life, the explorers take her back with them.
56	12	"The End Game"	Karl Zwicky	Nick Jacobs & Guy Mullally	February 2, 2002
Ambushed in the jungle, Roxton narrowly escapes with his life only to learn that he has apparently cheated death once too often. The Grim Reaper, in the guise of a dark seductress – is determined to add his soul to her collection. Transported to her domain – a bleak and desolate wasteland – Roxton must face a series of challenges if he hopes to get out alive. And to make the game more interesting, Death raises the stakes by putting the lives of his friends on the line as well. Confronted by shifting rules and deception, Roxton cannot hope to win. At every turn, Death torments and goads him, encouraging him to abandon his friends to save himself. Round one goes to Death, rounds two and three as well, and with growing horror, Roxton loses Challenger, Veronica, and finally his beloved Marguerite to Death's netherworld inferno.
57	13	"Phantoms"	Michael Carson	Guy Mullally	February 9, 2002
Alone in the jungle, Veronica hears piano music and follows it to its source – a 19th-century German village that has suddenly appeared in a fog choked valley. To her surprise, the handsome musician, Thomas Ducart, announces that he wrote the beautiful melody for her. Flattered by the musician's attention, Veronica takes him to the Treehouse, but Challenger is concerned. He fears that Ducart's village may be unstable, and Veronica could disappear into another dimension if she returns to the village with Ducart. Even more disturbing are Challenger's ill feelings about Ducart's designs on Veronica, but Challenger's warnings only drive the beguiled Veronica further into Ducart's passionate embrace.
58	14	"The Secret"	Michael Pattinson	Judith Reeves-Stevens & Garfield Reeves-Stevens	February 16, 2002
A mysterious visitor attacks Veronica, leaving an enigmatic ivory tile as his calling card. But when Marguerite finds the tile, she hides it from the others because only she knows what it means… one of the deepest secrets of her past has finally caught up with her, and now endangers her life and those of her friends.
59	15	"Finn"	Geoffrey Nottage	Guy Mullally	February 23, 2002
Using the Plateau's mysterious energy lines as a source of power, Challenger constructs a machine to send the explorers back to London. But when he, Roxton, and Marguerite find themselves in the same place they started from, they conclude the machine is a failure and head back to the Treehouse-only to discover the Treehouse is gone! While investigating what else has changed, Roxton is captured by slavers with automatic weapons and stripped-down cars, and learns the shocking truth-he and his friends are in the year 2033, eighteen years after an apocalyptic war devastated every place on Earth except for the Plateau. After returning back to the past they must warn the whole world and stop the future war when they get off the plateau.
60	16	"Suspicion"	Ian Gilmour	Judith Reeves-Stevens & Garfield Reeves-Stevens	March 2, 2002
When a lost archaeological expedition discovers a mysterious burial urn, the young student who opens it suddenly collapses in convulsions. Though she quickly recovers, Professor Hamilton, the expedition's leader, suspects she's contracted a disease from the urn's skeletal remains. He believes that's the only rational explanation for the inscription on the urn, warning that an evil demon is imprisoned within. But the next day, Roxton and Marguerite discover the expedition's camp has been torn apart, and that of all the archaeologists only two survive-Hamilton and his rival, Professor Campbell. In a tense standoff, the two men claim the other is possessed by the demon. Roxton's and Marguerite's intervention only succeeds in making the archaeologists suspect the demon has jumped into one of the two explorers.
61	17	"The Imposters"	Catherine Millar	Guy Mullally	April 8, 2002
Challenger, Roxton, and Marguerite take Finn to a cave where one year earlier a blinding light opened a doorway to another reality. Once inside, the explorers witness an eerie apparition of a man Finn recognizes and fears. But when Finn races from the cave, the three figures who follow are not her friends-they're Kayle, Una, and Rixxel, three demons who have taken the place of Challenger, Roxton, and Marguerite. If the demons can remain on the Plateau for two days, they will permanently replace the explorers, and Kayle will be free to bring chaos and destruction to the world. In the final deadly showdown between Finn and the demons, Finn must make the decision of her life-save the future or save her friends. Until an unexpected sacrifice changes everything…
62	18	"The Elixir"	Colin Budds	Nick Jacobs & Guy Mullally	April 15, 2002
Hoping to end starvation, Challenger becomes the first human subject to test his new experimental substitute for food. But his nutritional beverage is not as successful for him as it was for his lab mice, and he quickly becomes obsessed with discovering the reason why. Then obsession leads to madness as Challenger is confronted by two opposing hallucinations. Unconscious and near death, Challenger is finally discovered by his friends. But will their limited medical knowledge be enough to reverse the ravages of his experiment, without placing him in even greater peril?
63	19	"Tapestry"	Geoffrey Nottage	Judith Reeves-Stevens & Garfield Reeves-Stevens	April 22, 2002
After Challenger discovers the wreckage of a World War I transport plane, he's captured by its pilot, Lieutenant Drummond. Drummond has been stranded for five years since the crash, protecting the plane's cargo – a crate of iridium ingots stolen from the Royal Navy. Challenger is astounded to see the iridium because it had been intended for his secret wartime research. The sight of it prompts him to remember the night five years earlier, when he was questioned about the theft by two British intelligence agents working for MI5. Marguerite recognizes the iridium, too—she also was a suspect in its theft, and she recalls her own MI5 interrogation, the same night Challenger was questioned. Throughout the twists and turns, we find out that there may be more than just coincidence that has brought our small group to the plateau.
64	20	"Legacy"	Michael Carson	Judith Reeves-Stevens & Garfield Reeves-Stevens	April 29, 2002
Led by a dream, Veronica touches her mother's pendant to a stone monolith. A flash of mysterious energy knocks her unconscious, causing her to relive her last days with her long-lost parents as a young girl. When she awakes, she's shocked to realize her new memories don't match what she's always remembered of that time.
65	21	"Trapped"	Catherine Millar	Guy Mullally	May 6, 2002
A peaceful day of exploration turns deadly when a sudden explosion traps Marguerite and Roxton in an underground chamber. Their only hope for escape is Challenger, but the same explosion has left him with no memory of who he is, or what has happened to his friends. Meanwhile, a contest of friendly rivalry between Veronica and Finn leads to an enigmatic discovery at the Treehouse, as another memory from Veronica's childhood is literally uncovered. Faced with certain death, Roxton and Marguerite reveal emotions best left buried, so that even if they do survive their ordeal, there's a chance their relationship will not.
66	22	"Heart of the Storm"	Colin Budds	Guy Mullally, Judith Reeves-Stevens & Garfield Reeves-Stevens	May 13, 2002
Two days before Challenger's latest attempt to leave the Plateau by balloon, Veronica and Finn encounter a strange phenomenon and are briefly transported into the post-apocalyptic future of New Amazonia. Soon after, Roxton finds himself being chased by 17th-century Conquistadors while Marguerite is captured by Druids determined to sacrifice her in order to avert a mysterious storm which is fast approaching. Challenger encounters a time-shifted William Maple White before his death, before Challenger himself is displaced to a technologically advanced future centuries later, where unknown beings intend to remove him as a threat in the past to win their war in the future. As different planes of reality continue to collide, Veronica at last realizes the time has come for her to fulfill her destiny as Protector and wield her mother's pendant-the Trion. But even as she prepares to sacrifice her life to save her friends, she does not know if she's made the right decision – for once the power of the Trion is unleashed, will it save the Plateau or destroy it?
