= Benjamin Schmideg =

Australian actor

- Born: Benjamin Schmideg; 12 June 1986 (age 39); Victoria, Australia
- Other names: Jemima, Benchick, Benny
- Occupation: Actor
- Years active: 1999–present

Benjamin Schmideg (born 12 June 1986) is an Australian actor and architect born in Victoria.

== Filmography ==
=== Films ===
- Take Away – as Kynan (2002)

=== TV series ===
- Wicked Science – as Russell Skinner (First season: 2004; Second season: 2005–2006)
- Blue Heelers (appeared in one episode only; Of Middle Eastern Appearance – as Rufus Sedgwick – 2002)
- Short Cuts (appeared in one episode only; Wonder Twins Activate – as Mickey – 2002)
- Stingers (appeared in two episodes; The Whisper Room – as Redhead Skater – 2001; Blow Off – as Daniel – 2002)
- Neighbours (appeared in one episode only; Episode 3555 – as Martin – 2000)
- High Flyers – as JJ (1999)

== Other works ==
Schmideg appeared in some productions of: Bugsy Malone, A Midsummer Night's Dream, Friends Forever and Marat/Sade.
