= Brook Sykes =

Australian actor

- Born: Brook Sykes; 20 September 1983 (age 42); Melbourne
- Other name: Brook Rowan
- Occupation: Actor
- Known for: Round the Twist (TV series), Wicked Science
- Height: 1.80 m (5 ft 11 in)

Brook Sykes, also known as Brook Rowan (born 20 September 1983 in Melbourne), is an Australian actor, who started his career in TV as a child actor. He played James Gribble in the TV series, Round the Twist and Garth King in Wicked Science.

== Filmography ==
- Fags in the Fast Lane (2007 film)
- Dirt Game (appeared in two episodes – as Luke – 2009)
- Wicked Science – as Garth King (First season: 2004; Second season: 2005–2006)
- Blue Heelers (appeared in one episode only; "Good Times" – as Jeff Radley – 2005)
- You and Your Stupid Mate – as Sparks (2005)
- Stingers (appeared in one episode only; "Break and Enter" – as Mayvo – 2004)
- Round the Twist – as James "Gribbs" Gribble (2000–2001)
