= Guinevere Jones =

- The cover of the first book
- Genre: Drama; Family; Fantasy
- Created by: Elizabeth Stewart
- Based on: Arthurian legend
- Written by: Elizabeth Stewart (creator); Jesse McKeown; John Meadows; Annie Beach; Thérèse Beaupré; Ysabelle Dean; Rick Drew; Jutta Goetze; Piers Hobson; Cathy Moss; Susin Nielsen; Deborah Peraya
- Directed by: Peter Sharp; Arnie Custo; Bill Hughes; Pino Amenta
- Starring: Tamara Hope; Greta Larkins; Damien Bodie; Yani Gellman; Aljin Abella; Bridget Neval; Ted Hamilton; Don Halbert; Ian Dixon
- Composer: Jack Lenz
- Countries of origin: Canada; Australia
- Original language: English
- No. of seasons: 2
- No. of episodes: 26

Production
- Executive producers: Bruce Gordon; Tom Parkinson; Elizabeth Stewart; Kim Todd
- Producers: Sarah Cronin-Stanley; Lynn Bayonas; Tim Williams
- Production locations: Melbourne, Victoria, Australia
- Cinematography: Gary Moore
- Editors: Charlotte Disher; George Roulston; Robert K. Sprogis
- Camera setup: Gavin Head; Bruce Phillips; Peter White
- Production companies: Crawford Productions; Original Pictures; Ibis Entertainment

Original release
- Network: YTV
- Release: 4 May – 7 December 2002

Guinevere Jones is a fantasy television series and a series of four novels created by Elizabeth Stewart. It revolves around the adventures of the title character as she uses magic to fight evil, while at the same time dealing with problems and difficulties of high school. The show debuted in Canada on May 4, 2002, on YTV and ten days later in Australia. It ran for 26 episodes over two seasons.

== Cast ==
=== Main ===
- Tamara Hope as Gwen Jones:
  The main protagonist. 14 year old Gwen is an independent, passionate and temperamental fourteen-year-old living in a strange world, using magic to fight evil. She is the reincarnation of Guinevere, the 6th century Queen of Britain and King Arthur's wife. She and her mother moved from Canada to Australia. But Gwen was placed into the care of the Rosens, after her mother became ill and was sent to the mental hospital. Reluctantly, she takes on the role of the hero, fighting dark magic, mentored by Merlin. She is determined to prove to Merlin that she is not the flighty queen he knew in Camelot. Unfortunately, things don't always go as planned. (Note: Tamara Hope also portrays Queen Guinevere in flashbacks)
- Greta Larkins as Tasha Myers:
  Tasha is Gwen's intelligent and wacky best friend, and Josh's sister. She is into magic and new age stuff, but she is not an old soul like Gwen. She doesn't care about fitting in and shops at thrift stores, not always by choice, but that's how it is when money's a little tight. She works at a cafe called the Arc which is frequented by students at the school. She's a loyal sidekick to Gwen and with her knowledge of magic, she helps Gwen battle evil. She is excited that Gwen is the reincarnation of Guinevere and knows more about the legends of Camelot than Gwen does.
- Damien Bodie as Josh Myers:
  Josh is Tasha's older brother and Gwen's 'on and off' boyfriend. He is the utter opposite of his younger sister, Tasha. He is very much a foil to his sister. He's clean cut, responsible, and a hopeless romantic who's smitten with Gwen. Josh is jealous of Michael because he thinks Gwen is attracted to him. He's suspicious of the magic world, but when faced with competition for Gwen's attention, he decides to support Gwen and protect her, even though she doesn't want protection.
- Yani Gellman as Michael Medina:
  Dark, intense, mysterious - Michael is the bad risk that most girls find irresistible. He's a loner who spends as little time around school as he can get away with. Like Gwen, he's a misfit and an outsider, and he confides in her about the miseries of his home life. Gwen agrees to help Tasha win Michael's heart, while secretly harbouring her own feelings. Merlin warns Gwen away from him, but Gwen is attracted to him. He was unwillingly protected by the fairy Gadowain, until he used a magical gauntlet to repel against him.

=== Recurring ===
- Ted Hamilton as Merlin:
  The legendary 6th century wizard, and King Arthur's advisor and mentor. He acts as Gwen's stubborn and temperamental teacher. Merlin guides her in the crusade to shine light into the darkness of human affairs. He opposes Morgana La Faye and is trying to protect his crystal from her. He magically projects himself from his own time in the 6th century into Gwen's time, so that he can teach her how to use her magic to defeat Morgana. Merlin doesn't have much faith in Gwen because he always compares her to the Guinevere he knew, who caused the downfall of Camelot. But in spite of him and Gwen butting heads frequently, he always has affection and pride in Gwen.
- Aljin Abella as Spencer Huang:
  Spencer is one of Gwen's friends and is in on her secret. He's a genius with computers and a pretty good chess player.
- Bridget Neval as Reine Davidson:
  The primary antagonist of Gwen and her friends. Reine is Gwen's classmate and rival in love and magic. She is the reincarnation of Morgana La Faye, but she is unaware of this fact. She resents the fact that Josh likes Gwen, because she has a crush on Josh. Reine later on has a crush on Michael. She has some magic and uses it for her own selfish gain.
- Mercia Deane-Johns as Morgana La Faye:
  Morgana is King Arthur's evil half-sister. She is the greatest practitioner of black magic the world has ever known. She is the evil witch who opposes Gwen and Merlin, and is trying to steal Merlin's Stone. She wants to use its power to make herself immortal and rule the world. Her dark purpose is to steer mankind towards the ignorance and conflict that feeds evil and her power. She rivals Merlin in magical skills; however, she is still mortal and will one day die. It is revealed that Morgana was really the one responsible for Camelot's destruction, by casting a spell on Guinevere to cheat on Arthur with Lancelot. Saying she needed to destroy Arthur, in order to destroy Merlin.
- Don Halbert as Patrick O'Leary:
  Patrick is Gwen's teacher at school, but she soon learns that he is much more than that. He just seemed to show up one day after a teacher mysteriously falls ill. He's up to something and whenever Gwen turns around, he's there. He is revealed to be the reincarnation of Morgana's son Mordred, but he has other more personal reasons for being involved in Morgana and Merlin's battle. It is later revealed that he is actually Gwen's father.
- Ian Dixon as Gadowain:
  Gad is Michael's Faerie protector. He hangs around the Arc a lot and bums food off Tasha. Faeries have a dislike for iron and the iron bracelet that Gwen made for Michael is the only thing that will keep Gad from doing his job.

=== Guest ===
- Chris Hemsworth as King Arthur:
  The legendary 6th century King of Britain, and Guinevere's husband. He was betrayed by Guinevere when she cheated on him with Lancelot, and Camelot was brought to ruin as a result. Unbeknownst to Arthur, it was actually his evil half-sister Morgana who caused Camelot's downfall, by casting a spell on Guinevere and Lancelot. Legend says, Arthur was killed in battle by Mordred. (Note: He only appears in flashbacks of the series)
- Alex Tsitsopoulos as Lancelot:
  The legendary Knight of the Round Table in Camelot, whom Guinevere cheated on King Arthur with. Unbeknownst to Lancelot, he and Guinevere were enchanted to fall in love by Morgana to bring about Camelot's destruction. (Note: He only appeared in one flashback of the series. In episode "Love Hurts".)
- Vanessa Elliott as Fire Bromsky:
  She is a member of Reine's gang. Her real name is Frances.
- Katie Campbell as Wind Winters:
  Her real name is Winifred Winters, is a member of Reine's gang.
- Pepe Trevor as Mrs. Blatt:
  She is the Socials teacher.
- Dennis Coard as Harve Rosen:
  He is Gwen's foster father. He and his family live in a thrift store called New Sage which sells magical stuff, which comes in handy when Gwen is looking for ingredients for her spells.
- Briony Behets as Louise Rosen:
  She is Gwen's foster mother.
- Madeline Page as Katie Dawson:
  Katie is Gwen's younger foster sister. She has a habit of lying so people usually don't believe her when she's telling the truth. She loves having a big sister.
- Trudy Hellier as Karen Jones:
  Karen is Gwen's mother. Her body was inhabited by a demon, which was what caused her illness, and she spent her days in the mental hospital. She has a little magic.

== Episodes ==
=== Season 1 ===
No. overall	No. in season	Title	Directed by	Written by	Original release date
1	1	"Hard Rain"	Arnie Custo	Elizabeth Stewart	4 May 2002
In her first week at Griffin Secondary, Gwen realises there's something fishy about Ms. Blatt, the Socials teacher. Tasha suspects that Ms. Blatt is a witch, working a spell to steal youth and beauty from her students. Intuiting that Gwen has a sensitivity to magic, Tasha tries to enlist her to defeat the ever more youthful teacher—but meets with resistance and denial from Gwen. Meanwhile, Gwen meets Josh—and has her first encounter with Merlin.
2	2	"Psyched"	Arnie Custo	Elizabeth Stewart	11 May 2002
While a demon terrorizes Karen Jones’ hospital ward by making the patients’ nightmares come to life, Karen makes a sudden and remarkable recovery from psychosis. But Gwen's delight at regaining her mother is dashed when Karen refuses to leave the hospital—for reasons Karen will only confess when she learns to her dismay that Gwen has met Merlin, and has started on the path to discovering her magical powers. Magic is just one of things Gwen's mother has hidden from her: Gwen learns too late that Karen has enlisted Tasha to help her reclaim the demon of the psych ward, and return her to madness.
3	3	"That Old Black Magic"	Arnie Custo	Elizabeth Stewart	18 May 2002
Gwen has her first encounter with Morgana when Merlin's nemesis kidnaps Tasha in an effort to force Gwen to help her secure the ultimate prize: Merlin's Stone, an ancient crystal that holds the key to immortality. The rift between Gwen and Josh begins to mend as the two unite to save Tasha—and defeat Morgana. Merlin endows Gwen with a special gift: a talisman that belonged to Guinevere, and which will help Gwen to focus her power.
4	4	"Ordinary Evil"	Peter Sharp	Elizabeth Stewart	25 May 2002
Gwen learns more about the nature of evil when she thinks her temper is responsible for unleashing black magic that has caused Katie's caseworker to remove her from Harve and Louise's care. While Harve and Louise go through channels to get Katie back, Gwen and Tasha try to “undo” the spell, only making things worse for Katie—and putting Gwen at risk for being removed, too.
5	5	"Weird Sisters"	Peter Sharp	Elizabeth Stewart	1 June 2002
As the high school prepares a production of MacBeth, Gwen runs afoul of Wind, Reine and Fire when queen bee Reine realizes Gwen is her chief competition for Josh's affections. Meanwhile, Katie follows Gwen to the forest glade and discovers the secret of Gwen's magic—only to become the object of derision when she tries to impress the disbelieving kids at school with the knowledge. Patrick O’Leary takes up a teaching position at Griffin High.
6	6	"Dybbukkin"	Peter Sharp	Elizabeth Stewart	8 June 2002
While painting graffiti, Spencer Huang inadvertently becomes possessed by a Dybbuk, a Jewish demon that forces the possessee to commit mischief and evil deeds. But this Dybbuk has a purpose: to find a suitable host for his girlfriend, an even meaner Dybbuk. When he finds the perfect candidate in Reine, Gwen's new worst enemy learns all about Gwen's secret.
7	7	"First Date"	Arnie Custo	Elizabeth Stewart	15 June 2002
As Gwen and Josh look forward to their first date, Patrick O’Leary does his best to break them up—on orders from Morgana, for whom, we learn, O’Leary is working. Ultimately, though, O’Leary's meddling only brings Gwen and Josh closer together, leading O’Leary to stand up to Morgana: from now on they'll do things his way as he gradually wins Gwen's trust, in their ongoing pursuit of Merlin's Stone.
8	8	"Warwe and Mineer"	Arnie Custo	Piers Hobson	22 June 2002
A geology experiment goes awry for Spencer when he is magically sucked into an ancient rock painting. Problem is, the rock was also home to Warwe and Mineer, a star-crossed Aborigine couple, one half of whom has been projected out of the rock into present day. Gwen learns quickly that if she plans on saving Spencer, she must ensure a safe reunion of Warwe and Mineer.
9	9	"Love Hurts"	Arnie Custo	Elizabeth Stewart	29 June 2002
Just when Gwen and Josh are becoming a steady item, Tasha asks Gwen for a little magical assistance getting the attention of Michael Medina, a new boy at Griffin High. Gwen encounters a strange new force: the world of Faerie. She also makes the disturbing discovery that she herself is attracted to Michael, endangering her friendship with Tasha—and forcing her to face the legacy of Guinevere's fickle nature.
10	10	"The Dryad"	Peter Sharp	Jutta Goetze	6 July 2002
Merlin's tree is on the chopping block when Gwen and Tasha discover that a construction company has big plans for the forest glade. This spells certain doom for Fern, a faerie being known as a Dryad, and an inhabitant of Merlin's tree. Realizing that the head of construction also happens to be Reine's father, Gwen, Tasha and Josh conspire to halt the construction.
11	11	"Solo Act"	Peter Sharp	Jesse McKeown	13 July 2002
Michael makes the basketball team thanks to his jock father's generous charity to Griffin's sport's department. Problem is, Michael wants nothing to do with sports and wants his father to butt out of his life. Gwen's growing attraction leads to a discovery that there is something magical about Michael: a force from another world, who will do anything to protect him.
12	12	"Shadows"	Peter Sharp	Ysabelle Dean	20 July 2002
Michael's protector, a boorish faerie known as Gadowain, wreaks havoc in the arcade as Gwen, Tasha, Josh and Spencer try to hatch a plan to rid Michael of his burden. A riddle posed by Gadowain plagues Spencer, but the answer eventually comes clear: Iron is the faerie's weakness. Gadowain warns Gwen that there are stronger forces at work and that Michael needs his protection. They strike a truce: Gwen allows Gadowain to stay with Michael, but he must lay low, keeping Michael in the dark. But Gwen is forced to face a more troubling question: who is Michael, and what is his connection to faerie?
13	13	"Choices"	Pino Amenta	Annie Beach	27 July 2002
A woman claiming to be Karen's long-lost sister shows up unexpectedly on Gwen's doorstep. Amanda and Gwen quickly hit it off, but Harve and Louise harbor growing suspicions about their mysterious guest. Also a practitioner of magic, Amanda offers Gwen a free-spirited and fun-loving alternative to Merlin's strict regimen. Faced with an opportunity to move in with Amanda, Gwen must make a difficult decision about her future. Meanwhile, Josh's increasing suspicions about Gwen and Michael's relationship lead him to set up a double-date: he and Gwen, along with Tasha and Michael. But his jealousy compels Gwen to reach an inevitable conclusion: she has to do the right thing and break up with Josh. Meanwhile, Tasha—who has learned the truth about Michael's lack of feelings for her—blames Gwen, and breaks off all contact.

=== Season 2 ===
No. overall	No. in season	Title	Directed by	Written by	Original release date
14	1	"Lost and Found"	Unknown	Unknown	7 September 2002
Gwen finds herself isolated as she has broken up with Josh and Tasha is no longer speaking to her. But this is a stronger, more focused Gwen who is now determined to learn magic and save her mom. Meanwhile, Michael—without Gadowain's protection as long as he wears an iron bracelet—finds himself manipulated into a fight at school. Gadowain offers Gwen a deal: get Michael to remove the bracelet, and Gad will tell Gwen how to rid Karen of the demon.
15	2	"Time Cuts"	Pino Amenta	Rick Drew	14 September 2002
When a faerie dog known as Black Angus crosses Tasha's path, legend dictates that she has only a day to live. Gwen, still on non-speaking terms with Tasha, must exercise her greatest magical feat to date: turn back time to save Tasha. Time travel turns out to be more complicated than she expects, and she must find a way to thwart the forces of destiny if she plans on saving Tasha. In the end, Gwen succeeds, but—because time has replayed—Tasha doesn't realize Gwen has saved her life, and still refuses Gwen's friendship.
16	3	"Detention"	Peter Sharp	Jesse McKeown	21 September 2002
Gwen and Tasha are forced to work together when the spirit of a past Griffin teacher is unleashed in the school. A discipline freak, this Latin teacher with a penchant for black magic has unleashed a spell that turns all disagreeable students into models of conformity—and a determination to punish the student responsible for imprisoning him fifty years ago, Reine's grandmother. Gwen and Tasha join forces to defeat Mr. Bluton, and in the process mend their friendship. But Gwen doesn't realize that Reine has been awakened to magic.
17	4	"Wishes"	Peter Sharp	Susin Nielsen	28 September 2002
When Josh makes a half-serious wish to get Gwen back on an ancient amulet, he discovers to his initial joy that his wish has come true: Gwen is suddenly so devoted to him that she's even willing to give up the magic that has come between them in the past. Ultimately, though, Josh can find no happiness in a love that isn't real—but finds to his dismay that, in her determination to hold onto their relationship, Gwen has destroyed the amulet. It seems there is no way to take back the wish, and Gwen's personality will be altered forever.
18	5	"Tribes"	Peter Sharp	Thérèse Beaupré	5 October 2002
Gwen finds her friendship with Michael tested as, under Reine's influence, he falls more and more into the role of de facto leader of a gang of bad boys who are terrorizing the school with extortion and threats of violence. To make matters worse, Gwen discovers that her magical powers are defunct. Without magic, Gwen must rely on persuasion to help Michael stand up to Reine. Meanwhile, unbeknownst to Gwen Reine has been experimenting with magic.
19	6	"Easy Money"	Bill Hughes	Cathy Moss	12 October 2002
When money disappears first from the New Sage Shop and then from The Arc, circumstantial evidence points to Gwen as the culprit. Gwen must solve the mystery of what really happened to the money, while staving off the suspicions of an over-enthusiastic police detective.
20	7	"No Place Like Home"	Arnie Custo	Elizabeth Stewart	19 October 2002
When Gwen discovers that someone has worked a magical spell to prevent her from leaving the shop, she tries to figure out who is responsible through a series of flashbacks recalling her magical enemies: Reine, Morgana, Ms. Blatt. Meanwhile, Gadowain makes a nuisance of himself at The Arc when he decides to ingratiate himself to Michael's friends, hoping to persuade Michael to remove the iron bracelet and allow Gad to resume his job of protecting him.
21	8	"Bloodlines"	Bill Hughes	John Meadows	26 October 2002
When O’Leary arranges a car accident for Michael's parents and Mrs. Medina requires a blood transfusion, Michael is tested—and learns that through the blood results that there is an unusual component in his blood. Michael is sent reeling as Gwen reveals the truth: that, like Lancelot, he is half human—and half faerie. Michael decides to go to Faerie with Gadowain.
22	9	"Fifi"	Bill Hughes	Deborah Peraya	9 November 2002
Spencer is caught in an Internet scam when he inadvertently sells his emotions in exchange for the secrets of the universe. Meanwhile, Gwen is alarmed to discover that nobody remembers who Michael is. Gwen must find a way to break Spencer's contract and regain his emotions, while at the same time figure out a way to rescue Michael from Faerie. Gwen makes the startling realization that O’Leary is working for Morgana.
23	10	"Spellbound"	Peter Sharp	Elizabeth Stewart	16 November 2002
Gwen has succeeded in rescuing Michael from Faerie, but Michael is still under a spell that has caused everyone but Gwen to forget who he is. As Gwen works to undo the spell, she also pursues O’Leary—whom she discovers has been hiding right under her nose. O’Leary tells Gwen that Merlin's Stone is the key to saving her mother. Meanwhile, Merlin is attacked by Morgana.
24	11	"What Guinevere Knew"	Peter Sharp	Elizabeth Stewart	23 November 2002
Intent on saving Merlin, Gwen enters Faerie and succeeds in going back to Merlin's time. Tapping into her former life as Guinevere, she remembers the secret of how to find Merlin's Stone. Gwen manages to rescue Merlin and, thwarting Morgana's attempt to capture the crystal, returns to the 21st century with the crystal to save Karen—with O’Leary in hot pursuit.
25	12	"Darkness Falls"	Peter Sharp	Jesse McKeown	30 November 2002
Having used Merlin's Stone to save Karen, Gwen attempts to return the crystal to Merlin's time through Faerie, but O’Leary intervenes and gives the crystal to Morgana. But in a turn of events that surprises even O’Leary, O’Leary helps Gwen escape when Morgana attacks her. Gwen and O’Leary return to the 21st century to find that Morgana has ruled as an immortal for 1500 years. The world, including all of Gwen's friends, suffer under Morgana's tyranny—and Gwen herself has been declared an outlaw for practicing magic, which in this reality is preserved for Morgana alone.
26	13	"Rebellion"	Arnie Custo	John Meadows	7 December 2002
As humanity wallows under Morgana's tyranny, Gwen organizes Tasha, Josh, Spencer, Harve, Louise and Katie—all of whom are unaware that the world was ever different—into a resistance. Reluctantly accepting O’Leary's help, Gwen infiltrates Morgana's dungeons to retrieve Merlin's Stone and discovers her way blocked by Reine, Morgana's chief henchman. In a final showdown, Gwen makes the startling revelation that Reine is, in fact, Morgana, who has used the crystal to rejuvenate herself. Gwen leads her friends to victory over Morgana and returns the crystal to Merlin, thereby restoring reality. As Gwen and Karen prepare to move out of Rosen's and find their own apartment, there's one more surprise left for Gwen: the realization that Patrick O’Leary is her father.

== Magic ==
Based on the discussions in the series, people whose souls have been around for many lifetimes have magical ability. There appears to be a direct relationship between the age of the soul and a character's magic. Gwen, who has had many lifetimes, has powerful magic. Her Mom has some magic but not as much as Gwen. This is specifically discussed in the second episode.

It is specifically mentioned in the fifth episode (Weird Sisters) that objects do not have any magical ability. They just assist the bearer. This does not mean that objects cannot have spells cast on them. For example, the stone from Warwe and Mineer has magic on it.

The glade where Gwen talks to Merlin is near two Ley lines. This allows Gwen to focus her magic better.

=== Magical artifacts ===
There are several magical items. The most important is a large fluorescent blue gemstone called Merlin's Stone. It is so powerful that it could allow the bearer to become immortal and break away from the endless cycle of death and rebirth. That is the reason Morgana seeks it.

Formed from a tiny piece of the stone is Gwen's pendant. Assists her in using magic. She has used it for some of these purposes: erasing memories, influencing the actions of other people, and moving objects through telekinesis, as well as other purposes. The pendant lights up when it's near Merlin's stone.

In the first episode, Gwen receives a book from an unknown person. In the third episode, the book gets destroyed because evil magic is in it.

Eventually, in Rebellion, it is revealed that Merlin's Stone is actually relatively unimportant; Gwen's Pendant is actually more powerful.

== Settings ==
The majority of the action takes place in several places. The fictional Griffin High School is where most of the scenes involving school take place. It is casually mentioned in the thirteenth episode that the setting is near Melbourne, Australia.

Near the school is a small forest glade where Gwen can talk to Merlin. Merlin mentions that the glade is near where two ley lines intersect. That is also where Gwen learns much of her magic.

The Arc is the cafe and arcade where Tasha works. It is frequented by other students. The store Gwen's foster parents run is called The New Sage. It sells herbs. Gwen and her foster family live on the second floor of that same building. The hospital is called St. James's Hospital.

== Production ==
The series was a co-production between Canada and Australia. The Canadian production companies were Original Pictures Inc and Ibis Entertainment. They are based in Winnipeg. The Australian production company was Crawford Productions. The show was filmed at St. Hellier's Convent, a 120-year-old building and heritage site in Melbourne, Australia.

== Airings ==
Guinevere Jones is or was aired on: YTV and several other networks for its initial run. On March 1, 2005, YTV announced that it would be airing reruns of the show during the last half of March through May. In 2005, it appeared on Disney Channel Italy, Nickelodeon's UK and Middle East channels, and France 2. In Australia it was aired on Network Ten. The show also aired in the UK on Film 24 (Sky 157) on 7 November 2009.

== Books ==
- The four novels are a direct novelization of the television series.
- The first book is called A River Through Time and covers the events from the first fourth of the series. It was written by Sophie Masson.
- Book 2 covers the events of the remainder of the first season. It was written by Felicity Pulman. Its title is Love and Other Magic.
- The third book, titled The Dark Side of Magic covers the first part of the second season. It was also written by Pulman.
- Book 4, also by Masson, is called No Place Like Home. It covers the events from the last part of the second season.
- All four books are published by Random House Australia.

== Selected quotes ==
- "I told you, my name is Gwen." - Said by Gwen in every opening credit sequence.
- "We all have many lifetimes. We first met when you were King Arthur's queen. Your destiny is magic, Guinevere. Your task is to fight evil." - Said by Merlin in the opening credits.

== See also ==
- List of works based on Arthurian legends
