= Peter McCauley =

New Zealand actor

- Born: 8 March 1950 (age 76); New Zealand
- Occupation: Actor
- Years active: 1974 – present
- Spouse: Catherine Wilkin
- Website: petermccauley.com

Peter McCauley is an actor from New Zealand who has appeared in many television series and movies, mainly in his home country.

== Career ==
McCauley graduated from Toi Whakaari: New Zealand Drama School in 1973 with a Certificate in Acting. He has worked in television dramas such as Star Runner and Sir Arthur Conan Doyle's The Lost World in which he played Professor George Challenger. His character on The Lost World was a scientist with a thirst to prove the existence of dinosaurs on a plateau in the jungle. When the expedition is stranded he and other characters come upon various societies and creatures. The show lasted for three seasons before cancellation due to financial issues. He also appeared in several episodes of the Starz hit series Spartacus.

He has since worked for the BBC editing movies and television series.

== Filmography ==
=== Film ===
Year	Title	Role	Notes
1974	A State of Siege		Short film
1979	Middle Age Spread	Man in Pub	
1984	Pallet on the Floor	Sam Jamieson	
1985	Kingpin	Paul Jeffries	
1985	Hot Target	Det. Inspector Nolan	
1986	Aces Go Places IV	Digger	
1986	Bridge to Nowhere	Tanya's Father	
1987	Young Detectives on Wheels	Brian Mitchell	
1987	Starlight Hotel	Repo Man	
1998	The Interview	Det. Hudson	
2003	The Locals	Bill	
2006	Perfect Creature	Prof. Liepsky	
2010	After the Waterfall	George	
2011	Netherwood	Duncan	
2012	Existence	Robert	
2016	The Couple	Husband	Short
2016	The Light Between Oceans	Sergeant Spragg	

=== Television ===
Year	Title	Role	Notes
1979	Children of Fire Mountain	Capt. Bloom	TV miniseries
1980	High Country	James Cameron	TV film
1984	Heroes	Tony	"1.5"
1986	Open House	Ray Frazer	"Happy Birthday"
1987	Steel Riders	Brian Mitchell	"Bloodstones", "Cops"
1991	Shark in the Park	Dean Solomon	Recurring role
1992	The Ray Bradbury Theater	Sheriff	"The Dead Man"
1993	Phoenix	Inspector Lew Murdoch	Main role
1993	Snowy	Kendall	"Dams, Schemes & Damn Schemes", "High Claim, Higher Title"
1993	The Feds: Seduction	Chad	TV film
1995	Fire	Commissioner	"Hellfire"
1995	Mysterious Island	Mr. Spilett	"First Impressions Are Skin Deep", "Gideon's Tale"
1995–97	Shortland Street	Dr. Finlay Keats	TV series
1996	The Man from Snowy River	Higgins / Capt. Ezra King	"Code of Ethics", "Black Sheep"
1996	Xena: Warrior Princess	Talmadeus	"The Greater Good"
1997	20,000 Leagues Under the Sea	Admiral McCutcheon	TV film
1997	Roar	Culann / Brach	"Banshee", "The Spear of Destiny"
1998	Good Guys, Bad Guys	Henry Doak	"Zen Go the Strings of My Heart"
1998	Blue Heelers	Lionel Hughes	"Spinning the Yarn"
1998	The Violent Earth	Theroux	TV miniseries
1998	State Coroner	Sgt. Ted Harris	"Body of Evidence"
1998	Hercules: The Legendary Journeys	Various	Recurring role
1998	The Chosen	Det. Graham	TV film
1999	Stingers	Charlie Pearce	"Faking It"
1999–02	The Lost World	Prof. George Challenger	Main role; 66 episodes
2000	Tales of the South Seas		"Isabelle's Brother"
2002	The Outsider	Isaiah Miller	TV film
2004–05	The Secret Life of Us	Calum McKlintock	"Stretching the Friendship", "The Heart of Friday Night", "The Treadmill"
2005	Hercules	Nestor	TV miniseries
2010	Legend of the Seeker	Sorcerer	"Resurrection"
2011	Longing for Paradise Island	Gary	TV film
2011	Tangiwai: A Love Story	Bill Blair	TV film
2012	Spartacus: War of the Damned	Lucius Caelius	Recurring role
2012–13	Nothing Trivial	Rock Wedgewood	Recurring role
2020	The Letter for the King	General	2 episodes

=== Theatre ===
Year	Title	Role	Notes
1994	Falling from Grace	Michael Brazinski	Playbox Theatre
2003	Ghosts		The Court Theatre
2004	Goldie	Louis Steele	Auckland Theatre Company
2006	Twelfth Night		Auckland Theatre Company
2009	The Pohutukawa Tree		Auckland Theatre Company
