= David Orth =

Canadian actor (born 1965)

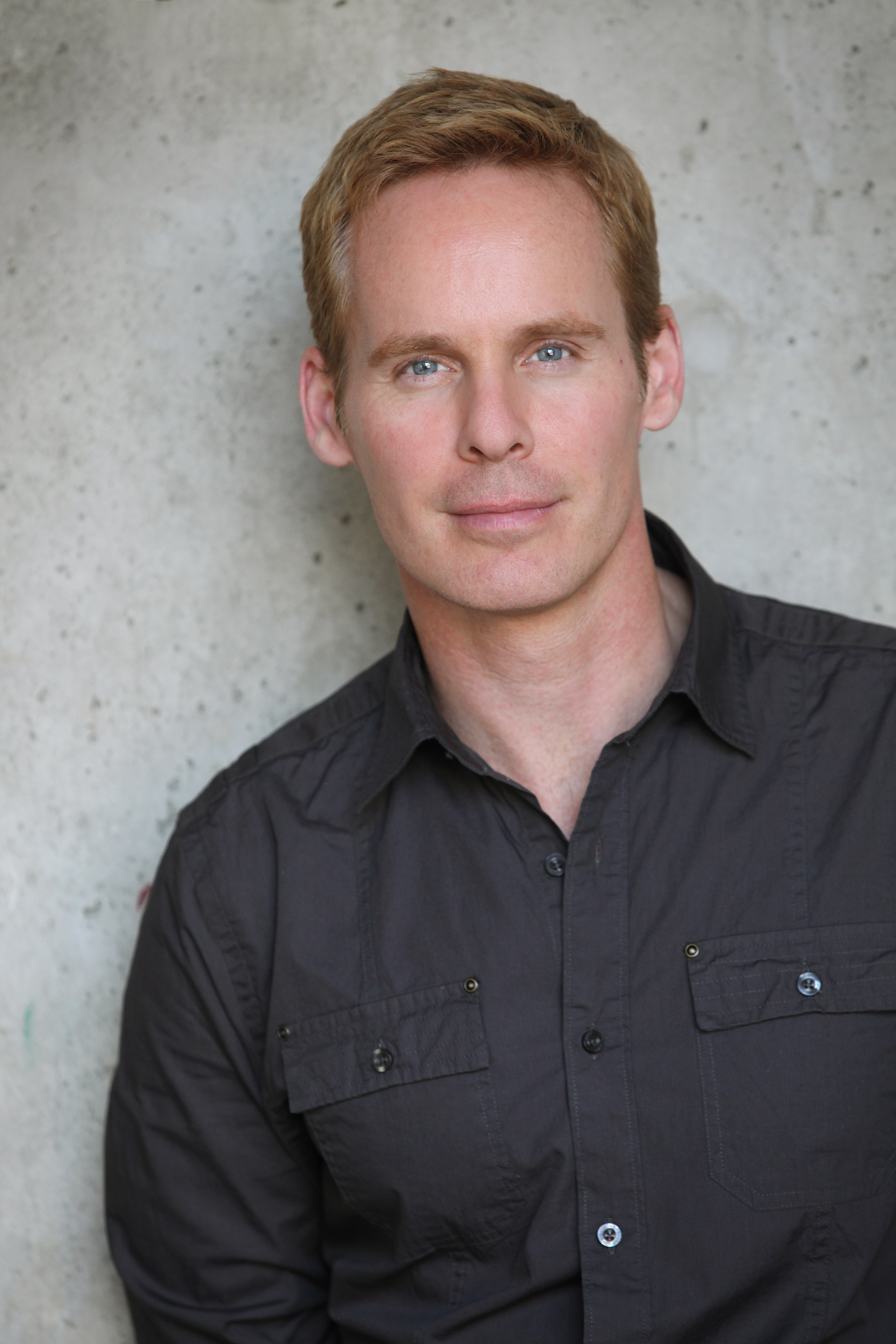
- David Orth in 2010
- Born: Kitchener, Ontario, Canada
- Occupation: Actor
- Years active: 1986–present

David Orth is a Canadian actor.

== Life and career ==
Orth was born and raised in Kitchener, Ontario. His most notable role was as Edward 'Ned' Malone in the TV series Sir Arthur Conan Doyle's The Lost World, which was shot in Australia, which he played from 1999 until 2002, although his appearances in the final season were curtailed due to Australian tax laws. During the shooting of The Lost World, he purchased a home in Australia and met his wife there. Orth voiced Blizzard in Iron Man: Armored Adventures. He has also starred in Beyond Reality, The Ray Bradbury Theatre, the episode "Scarecrow" on the CW's horror/drama series Supernatural, and the two-part premiere of R. L. Stine's The Haunting Hour: The Series.

He has also appeared on stage, including in Colin Thomas's Flesh and Blood in 1991.

== Filmography ==
=== Film ===
Year	Title	Role	Notes
2006	Boom Boom Sabotage	Todd / Carnie (voice)	Video
2007	White Noise: The Light	Dr. Serling	
2008	On the Other Hand, Death	Peter Garritty	
2009	Messages Deleted	Jeremy Potter	
2009	2012	AF1 Lieutenant	
2013	Midnight Stallion	Brad Chaney	
2014	If I Stay	Surgeon for Driver	
2015	Fifty Shades of Grey	Savannah Hotel Waiter	

=== Television ===
Year	Title	Role	Notes
1986	The Lawrenceville Stories	Beefsteak	"The Beginning of the Firm"
1986	The Campbells	Daniel O'Connor	"The Shiners"
1987	American Playhouse	The Uncooked Beefsteak	"The Prodigious Hickey"
1987	Night Heat		"Tell Me a Story"
1988	Double Standard	Mike	TV film
1988	Friday the 13th: The Series	Scott Thomas	"Vanity's Mirror"
1989	Friday the 13th: The Series	Vance Cassidy	"Demon Hunter"
1989	The Hitchhiker	Brian	"The Dying Generation"
1990	Friday the 13th: The Series	Tommy Betz	"Midnight Riders"
1990	The Last Best Year	Arthur Jr	TV film
1991	Le peloton d'exécution	Mazur	TV film
1991	My Secret Identity		"Trial by Peers"
1992	Beyond Reality	Young Nolan Randolph	"The Dying of the Light"
1992	The Ray Bradbury Theater	Benjy	"Great Wide World Over There"
1993	Class of '96	Prep School Friend	"Midterm Madness"
1993	The Hidden Room	Chuckie	"While She Was Out"
1994	RoboCop: The Series	Billy Sullvan	"Midnight Minus One"
1996	In the Fold	Mailman	TV film
1997	F/X: The Series	Chris	"Medea"
1997	Melanie Darrow	Rick	TV film
1998	Labor of Love	Tim	TV film
1998	Traders	MBA Student Fred	"Blood on the Floor", "Little Monsters"
1998	Mythic Warriors	Jason (voice)	"Jason and the Argonauts"
1999	Mythic Warriors	Jason (voice)	"Jason and Medea", "Castor and Pollux"
1999	Total Recall 2070	Air Safety	"Astral Projections"
1999–2002	The Lost World	Edward 'Ned' Malone	Main role; 50 episodes
2004	Sue Thomas: F.B.Eye	Tom Bell / Togo / Buddy's Owner	"Bad Hair Day"
2004	Mutant X	William Dennett	"No Exit"
2004	Blue Murder	Darren Carlyle	"Upstairs Downstairs"
2004	Degrassi: The Next Generation	Christopher	"Anywhere I Lay My Head", "Voices Carry: Parts 1 & 2"
2005	Stargate Atlantis	Captain Radner	"The Siege: Part 2"
2005	Devil Kings	Talon (voice)	Video game
2005	Smallville	Soldier with Megaphone	"Commencement"
2006	Supernatural	Sheriff	"Scarecrow"
2006	Falcon Beach	Uncle Steve Tanner	"Papa Was a Rolling Stone"
2006	The Collector	Ian Park	"The Media Baron"
2006	The Stranger Game	Charlie King	TV film
2006	The Evidence	Mr. Tanner	"And the Envelope Please"
2006	Fallen	Gym Teacher	TV film
2006	In Her Mother's Footsteps	Bobby Nolan AKA Robert Ellis	TV film
2007	The L Word	Mr. Wincorn	"Lesson Number One"
2007	Blood Ties	Jonah	"Post Partum"
2008	Death Note	Aiber (Voice)	"Ally", "Performance", "Renewal"
2008	Past Lies	Marcia	TV film
2008	Smallville	Doctor	"Fracture"
2008	NYC: Tornado Terror	Pilot	TV film
2009	Iron Man: Armored Adventures	Donnie Gill / Blizzard (voice)	"Cold War", "Best Served Cold"
2010	Fringe	Trooper Pekarski	"Johari Window"
2010	R.L. Stine's The Haunting Hour	Henry	"Really You: Parts 1 & 2"
2010	Shattered	Kirk Mitchell	"In the Dark"
2010	Human Target	Severenson Kleman	"The Other Side of the Mall"
2011	Fairly Legal	Ben Collins	"Priceless"
2011	Iron Man: Armored Adventures	Donnie Gill / Blizzard (voice)	"The Invincible Iron Man Part 2: Reborn"
2011	Exposed	Warren Morrow	TV film
2011	Chaos	Harris	"Proof of Life"
2012	Inuyasha: The Final Act	Shishinki	"A Complete Meido"
2012	Iron Man: Armored Adventures	Donnie Gill / Blizzard (voice)	"Hostile Takeover"
2013	Dangerous Intuition	Frank Fellows	TV film
2014	Once Upon a Time	NY Cop #1	"New York City Serenade"
2014	Cedar Cove	Judge Andrews	"Starting Over"
2016	Homeworld: Deserts of Kharak	Intel (voice)	Video game
2018	Llama Llama	Grandpa Llama (voice)	"Zoom Zoom Zoom"
