= Danny Alder =

Australian actor

- Born: London, England, UK
- Other name: Danny Allder
- Occupation: Actor
- Website: Danny Alder Website

Danny Alder, sometimes credited as Danny Allder, is a UK-based Australian film, television and theatre actor.

== Education ==
He attended the Western Australian Academy of Performing Arts at the Edith Cowan University in Mount Lawley, Western Australia, and the Aboriginal Centre for the Performing Arts (http://www.acpa.net.au) in Brisbane.

== Career ==
Alder worked consistently in Australia on both stage and screen in Brisbane, Queensland and Melbourne and decided to move to the UK in 2007.

Within a few weeks of arriving in the UK, he accepted the role of Fin on EastEnders (one episode; credited as Danny Allder).

Alder has since worked in France, Israel, Portugal and Italy appearing in a new comedy Ikea commercial set in a prison.

He has also appeared in several films including Blurred written by Stephen Davies and the Melbourne made horror film Damned by Dawn.

=== A Fistful of Snow ===
In 2009 Alder performed in his second one-man show, A Fistful of Snow, as part of the Brighton Festival Fringe in Brighton, England, for which he received an award for 2009 Best Male Performer from Latest 7, a weekly magazine covering the Brighton area.

A Fistful of Snow was then performed at the 2009 Edinburgh Festival Fringe in Edinburgh, Scotland, at C Venues. whilst Danny was also performing in "The Hotel" a concept theatre piece, written and directed by UK comedian and writer, Mark Watson.
