= Tales of the South Seas =

1998 Australian TV series

- Directed by: Donald Crombie; Ian Barry; Ian Gilmour; Scott Hartford-Davis; Brendan Maher
- Starring: William Snow; Rene Naufahu; Rachel Blakely; Rowena King; Mark Lee; Kimberley Joseph; Adrian Wright
- Composers: Garry McDonald; Lawrence Stone
- Country of origin: Australia
- Original language: English
- No. of seasons: 1
- No. of episodes: 22

Production
- Executive producers: Marla Ginsburg; Jeffrey M. Hayes
- Producer: Darryl Sheen
- Cinematography: Mark Wareham
- Editors: Suzanne Flannery; Tim Wellburn; Michael J Hagan
- Running time: 45 minutes
- Production companies: CLT-UFA; Gaumont Télévision; South Pacific Pictures; Village Roadshow Pictures

Original release
- Network: Network Ten
- Release: February 3 – June 30, 1998

Tales of the South Seas is a 1998 Australian TV series loosely based on Jack London's 1912 novel A Son of the Sun.

== Plot ==
Set at the turn of the 20th century, Tales of the South Seas follows David Grief, captain of The Rattler, and his Polynesian friend and partner, Mauriri Lepau, on their adventures in the Pacific South Sea Islands. After helping to prove her innocence after she was falsely accused of murder, they are often joined by Isabelle Reed, a stable owner on the island.

== Main Cast ==
- William Snow as David Grief
- Rene Naufahu as Mauriri Lepau
- Rachel Blakely as Isabelle Reed
- Rowena King as Lavinia Timoto
- Mark Lee as Rev. Colin Trent
- Kimberley Joseph as Claire Devon
- Adrian Wright as Lt. Jean Morlais

== Episodes ==
No.	Title	Directed by	Written by	Original release date	Prod. code
1	"Paradise Regained"	Ian Barry	Peter McCabe	February 3, 1998	9701
Guest cast: Gottfried John as Gunter; Anthony Hawkins as the bishop
2	"The Devil's Pearl"	Donald Crombie	Peter McCabe	February 10, 1998	9702
Guest cast: Bruce Spence as Naari Herring
3	"The Locket"	Donald Crombie	Peter McCabe	February 17, 1998	9703
4	"Lessons for a Warrior"	Scott Hartford-Davis	Teleplay by : Michael Norell & Cynthia A. Cherbak; Story by : Peter McCabe	February 24, 1998	9704
Guest cast: Jerome Ehlers as villain
5	"Trent in Love"	Ian Barry	Teleplay by : Jennifer Cecil; Story by : Peter McCabe	March 3, 1998	9705
Guest cast: John Noble as Christian Ambrose
6	"The Fiery Messiah"	Scott Hartford-Davis	Teleplay by : Lynn Mamet; Story by : Peter McCabe	March 10, 1998	9706
7	"Blackbirding"	Ian Gilmour	Teleplay by : Sean Clark; Story by : Peter McCabe	March 17, 1998	9707
Guest cast: Anthony Hawkins as the bishop; Ian Bliss
8	"The Rabblerouser"	Donald Crombie	Karen Harris	March 24, 1998	9708
Guest cast: John Bach as Miller
9	"Isabelle's Brother"	Ian Gilmour	Teleplay by : Jeffrey Bloom	March 31, 1998	9709
Guest cast: Peter McCauley as William Reed
10	"The Boxer Rebellion"	Not credited	Jennifer Cecil	April 7, 1998	9710
11	"The Statue"	Donald Crombie	Peter McCabe	April 14, 1998	9711
Guest cast: Imogen Annesley
12	"Fool's Gold"	Scott Hartford-Davis	Mike Sussman	April 21, 1998	9712
13	"The Assassin"	Colin Budds	Teleplay by : Lynn Mamet; Story by : Peter McCabe	April 28, 1998	9713
14	"The Outlaws"	Ian Gilmour	Tim Davis & Elinor Jewett	May 5, 1998	9714
15	"Fatal Shore"	Donald Crombie	Peter McCabe	May 12, 1998	9715
16	"Fast Company"	Brendan Maher	Phyllis Strong	May 19, 1998	9716
Guest cast: Manu Bennett as David Legeure; Mark Hembrow
17	"The Eye of Tangaroa"	Brendan Maher	Shane Brennan	May 26, 1998	9717
18	"Rock of Ages"	Karl Zwicky	Yuki Asano	June 2, 1998	9718
19	"Grief and the Lepers"	Karl Zwicky	Story by : Peter McCabe; Teleplay by : Hannah Louise Shearer	June 9, 1998	9719
20	"The Compass and the Killer"	Brendan Maher	Jennifer Cecil	June 16, 1998	9720
21	"The Tender Trap"	Ian Gilmour	Mike Sussman	June 23, 1998	9721
22	"The End of Jenny"	Brendan Maher	Jennifer Cecil	June 30, 1998	9722
