= Greta Larkins =

Australian actress

- Born: 1985 or 1986 (age 40–41); Melbourne, Victoria
- Occupation: Child actress
- Years active: 2002–2006; 2011–present
- Website: fashgif.cargo.site

Greta Larkins (born 1985–1986) is an Australian former television child actress and influencer. She played lead roles in Guinevere Jones and Holly's Heroes.

She later worked in advertising, trend forecasting and product development, before she established fashion GIF making service FashGIF in 2011, through her Tumblr blog based in her hometown of Melbourne.

== Television work ==
Year	Title	Genre	Role	Notes
2002	Guinevere Jones	Fantasy series	Tasha	
2002	Blue Heelers	Police procedural series	Gretel Wagner	One episode: "Deep Water"
2004	Fergus McPhail	Comedy series	Reinga	One episode: "The Act"
2005	Scooter: Secret Agent	Comedy series	Karla	One episode: "Operation Kidnap"
2005	Holly's Heroes	Drama series	Jacinta Peterson	Six episodes: "A Whole New Ball Game", "Making the Grade", "Home Court Advantage", "Taking the Charge", "Buzzer Beater" and "Double Team"
2005–2006	Wicked Science	Fantasy Comedy drama series	Sasha Johnson	Second season
