= Damned by Dawn =

- Directed by: Brett Anstey
- Written by: Brett Anstey; Russell Friedrich; Rob Townshend
- Produced by: Brett Anstey; Luke Gibson; Dave Redman
- Starring: Renee Willner; Bridget Neval; Dawn Klingberg; Danny Alder; Taryn Eva; Peter Stratford; Mark Taylor
- Cinematography: Reg Spoon
- Edited by: Dave Redman
- Music by: Phil Lambert (composer); Scott McIntyre
- Production company: The Amazing Krypto Bros. Productions
- Distributed by: Image Entertainment
- Release dates: 19 October 2009 (Screamfest Film Festival); 9 November 2010 (United States)
- Running time: 81 minutes
- Country: Australia
- Language: English

Damned by Dawn is a 2009 Australian independent horror film written and directed by Brett Anstey, starring Renee Willner, Bridget Neval, Dawn Klingberg, Danny Alder, Peter Stratford, Taryn Eva and Mark Taylor. It was released in United States on Blu-ray and DVD by Image Entertainment on 9 November 2010.

== Plot ==
Claire (Renee Willner) goes to see her family living in a squalid farm after 18 months with her boyfriend Paul (Danny Alder). When Claire arrives, she brings with her a mysterious vase containing specific instructions. Living on the farm are her father Bill (Peter Stratford), her younger sister Jen (Taryn Eva) and her old grandmother Nana (Dawn Klingberg) who is about to die after a long illness. She starts speaking to Claire about a strange woman known as "The Banshee" (Bridget Neval) that will take care of her after the death. At first, Claire thinks that her grandmother is raving, but afterwards she starts hearing piercing screams and a female figure enters in their house, walking towards Nana's room. Claire learns that the Banshee actually exists, and has to fight against this female ghost and her spirits wanting to damn the entire family.

== Cast ==
- Renee Willner as Claire, a young woman involved in the fight against the Banshee in order to save her family.
- Bridget Neval as the Banshee, an evil female spirit wanting to damn Claire's family.
- Danny Alder as Paul, Claire's boyfriend.
- Peter Stratford as Bill, Claire's father.
- Dawn Klingberg as Nana, Claire's dying grandmother.
- Taryn Eva as Jen, Claire's younger sister.
- Mark Taylor as Simmo.
- Nina Nicols as a ghost.
- Trent Schwarz as a ghost.
