= William Snow (actor) =

Australian actor

Will Snow
- Born: William Snow; 15 June 1960 (age 65); Sydney, Australia
- Occupation: Actor
- Years active: 1997–2007
- Spouse: Kim Kilbey (m. 2002; div. 2008)

William Snow (born 15 June 1960) is an Australian actor born in Sydney. He is most famous for his role as Lord John Roxton on the TV series Sir Arthur Conan Doyle's The Lost World. He is also known for his voice-over work on the Outback Steakhouse commercials.

== Filmography ==
Film and television
Year	Title	Role	Notes
1997	One Way Ticket		TV film
1998–2000	Tales of the South Seas	David Grief	Main role
1999	Dead End	Todd Russell	
1999–2002	The Lost World	Lord John Roxton	Main role; 66 episodes
2004	The Young and the Restless	Ian Gardner	2 episodes
2004	Ty the Tasmanian Tiger 2: Bush Rescue	Various (voice)	Video game
2005	Hercules	King Theseus	TV miniseries
2005	The Closer	Donnie Holt	"About Face"
2005	Charmed	Vaklav	"The Lost Picture Show"
2007	Brotherhood of Blood	Tom Clayton	
2007	Aztec Rex	Mendoza	
