= Bridget Neval =

Australian actress (born 1985)

- Born: Bridget Neval; 13 February 1985 (age 41); New Delhi, India
- Occupation: Actress
- Years active: 1998–2012; 2020
- Known for: Neighbours
- Height: 1.70 m (5 ft 7 in)
- Spouse: Amos Phillips (m. 2011)
- Children: 2

Bridget Phillips (nee Neval) (born 13 February 1985) is an Australian former actress. She has been in various television programs including Wicked Science and is most famous for her portrayal of Lana Crawford in Neighbours.

== Early life ==
Neval was born in India, to a Canadian father and Australian mother, and lived there for a few months before moving to Canada. She then moved to Australia at the age of 13. This has resulted in her having a unique accent which is a mixture of Australian and Canadian.

Neval acted in school plays and secured an agent with the idea of working as an extra, but after going for auditions, she began landing speaking roles. After playing roles in children's series and short films, she secured a role on Neighbours while studying her final year in high school.

== Career ==
Neval's first main role was on 2002 Canadian television series Guinevere Jones in which she played Reine Davidson, the nemesis of protagonist Guinevere Jones and her friends.

From 2003 to 2005, Neval then portrayed the lead of teenage genius Elizabeth Hawke in Australian-produced children's series Wicked Science. In the series Elizabeth Hawke and Toby Johnson became geniuses after a science experiment went wrong. Elizabeth had previously been a quiet nerd but she uses her new-found intelligence for evil, making her the villain of the program. Only fellow genius Toby can stop her from hurting innocent people.

From 2004 to 2005, Neval secured a part in long-running Australian soap opera Neighbours, playing Lana Crawford, the series' first lesbian character. She later returned for Neighbours 35th Anniversary on 18 March 2020.

Neval then played sixteen-year-old Amelia in stage production Chasing Pegasus from 3 October 2006, as part of the Melbourne Fringe Festival.

In 2006, Neval appeared in Australian horror film Damned by Dawn playing the role of The Banshee, a ghostly spirit whose eerie cries awaken the dead. The film was released in America on Blu-ray and DVD on 9 November 2010. She appeared in yet another Australian horror movie Crawlspace in 2012, as 'Echo Unit'.

== Personal life ==
In March 2011, Neval married voice actor Amos Phillips in Byron Bay, Australia. She has legally changed her name to Bridget Phillips. Together they have two children.

In December 2011, she began contributing articles to Bon Vivant, an Australian comedy website.

On her personal blog and elsewhere, Neval has spoken about her history of depression and eating disorders. She cites this as her main reason for leaving the acting industry. After her initial stint on Neighbours, she obtained some minor qualifications in social sciences/counselling and worked in office jobs.

== Acting credits ==
=== Film ===
Year	Title	Role	Notes
2008	Ken's Bad Day		Award-winning short film
2010	Damned by Dawn	The Banshee	Direct to video film
2012	Crawlspace	Echo Unit	

=== Television ===
Year	Title	Role	Notes
2002	Guinevere Jones	Reine Davidson	Lead role, 23 episodes
2004	Kath & Kim	Amber	1 episode
2004–2006	Wicked Science	Elizabeth Hawke	Lead role, 52 episodes
2006	Wicked Science – The Movie	Elizabeth Hawke	TV movie
2004–2005; 2020	Neighbours	Lana Crawford	19 episodes

=== Theatre ===
Year	Title	Role	Notes
2006	Chasing Pegasus	Amelia	Gasworks Main Theatre with Incognita Enterprises for Melbourne Fringe Festival
