= Rachel Blakely =

Australian actress

- Born: Rachel Leigh Blakely; 28 July 1968 (age 58); Brunei
- Occupations: Model, actress
- Years active: 1991–2013, 2025–present
- Spouse: Peter Craig (m. 1990, divorced)
- Partner: Sean Rigby (1997–present)
- Children: 2

Rachel Leigh Blakely (born 28 July 1968) is an Australian actress. Her works include films such as Love Until, Young Hercules and Counterstrike, as well as guest appearances on television shows such as Xena: Warrior Princess, State Coroner and Flipper. She is best known for her role as Gaby Willis in Neighbours, Marguerite Krux on Sir Arthur Conan Doyle's The Lost World, and as Glenda Fry in the Australian series Mortified.

== Personal life ==
Rachel Leigh Blakely was born on 28 July 1968 in Brunei, Borneo. Her father, Harold Blakely, is an American, and her mother was Australian. Due to her father's oil business, the family, including younger sister Ruth, moved to several countries over the years until settling on an Australian farm when Blakely was twelve.

Before she became an actress, Blakely worked as a nightclub bouncer, a model and a short order cook; it was her ex-husband's suggestion that she audition for a role on Neighbours.

In her spare time, Blakely enjoys camping, sewing, painting, cooking and sleeping. Her favourite authors are Margaret Atwood and Tracy Chevalier, and her favourite movies are Queen Margot and Breaking the Waves.

Blakely married fellow actor Peter Craig in 1990, but they divorced some years later. She met her current partner, stuntman Sean Rigby, on the set of Tales of the South Seas. Their first child, Cooper Lee Rigby, was born in September 2003, and their second child, Nash Rigby, was born in early 2009.

== Career ==
Blakely was a successful model, before she was spotted by the Neighbours casting director and asked to audition for the role of Gaby Willis. Blakely was introduced to the show as Gaby in August 1991. In October 1993, David Brown of TV Week reported Blakely would be leaving Neighbours. She filmed her final scenes the following month. Blakely later reprised her role of Gaby for Neighbours' 20th anniversary episode, which was originally broadcast on 27 July 2005.

Blakely then moved into films - mostly made for television - and guest appearances on well-known television shows. The actress has also been part of the leading cast on several programs, including Blue Heelers, City Life and The Lost World. She also joined the cast of Mortified, playing Glenda Fry. In 2000, Blakely appeared in four episodes of Search Party and five episodes of Hollywood Squares, as herself.

== Filmography ==
=== Film ===
| Year | Title | Role | Notes |
|---|---|---|---|
| 1995 | Love Until | Madeline | |
| 1997 | Mr. Nice Guy | Sandy | |
| 1998 | Young Hercules | Alcmene | Video |
| 2010 | The Chronicles of Narnia: The Voyage of the Dawn Treader | Gael's Mother | |

=== Television ===
| Year | Title | Role | Notes |
|---|---|---|---|
| 1991–1994 | Neighbours | Gaby Willis | Main role |
| 1993 | The Feds: Deception | Victoria Payne | TV film |
| 1995–1997 | Blue Heelers | Gina Belfanti | Recurring role |
| 1996–1997 | City Life | Siobhan O'Halloran | Recurring role |
| 1997 | One Way Ticket | Deborah Carter | TV film |
| 1997 | Xena: Warrior Princess | Penelope | "Ulysses" |
| 1997 | State Coroner | Lisbeth Christi | "Blood Sport" |
| 1997 | Flipper | Melisand | "Mermaid Island" |
| 1998 | Tales of the South Seas | Isabelle Reed | Main role |
| 1999 | Tribe | Lucille Fournier | TV miniseries |
| 1999–2002 | The Lost World | Marguerite Krux | Main role; 66 episodes |
| 2000 | Max Knight: Ultra Spy | Ricki / Claire | TV film |
| 2002 | Counterstrike | Brittany Cooper | TV film |
| 2003 | The Turner Affair | Natalie Turner | TV film |
| 2005 | Neighbours | Gaby Willis | "Friends for Twenty Years" |
| 2006–2007 | Mortified | Glenda Fry | Recurring role |
| 2010 | Sea Patrol | Fiona Douglas | "Ransom" |
| 2010 | Accord'n to Jordyn | Jordyn's Mum | Unsold TV pilot |
| 2013 | Reef Doctors | Megan | "1.9" |
| 2025 | Darby and Joan | Lorene Tait | "2.5" |
