= Susan Lay =

British actress

Susan Lay (born March 13, 1985) is an English actress, musician, TV presenter and radio DJ. She has worked in many countries across different entertainment media.

After moving to Los Angeles at age 16 Lay appeared in several American TV shows, TV movies and independent films. However, her biggest achievements came as the host of radio shows "Susan Lay Rocks" and "The British Invasion", both of which achieved critical acclaim and ratings success.

After completing her studies in the United States Lay moved around Italy, France and Canada, largely working on stage and in independent film. While in France she also worked with the band Dahlia, writing songs, touring and performing on several tracks. In 2007 Lay moved to Brazil, taking the role of Ana in the successful telenovela Paginas da Vida.

As of 2008 Lay is working in Singapore as a sports presenter on ESPN Star Sports.
