= Swansong (play) =

Play by Anton Chekhov

Swansong (Russian: Лебединая песня, romanized: Lebedinaya pesnya) is an 1887 play by Anton Chekhov, based on his own story "Calchas", concerning an elderly actor.
