= Wicked Science =

- Genre: Speculative fiction Teen drama Comedy thriller
- Created by: Jonathan M. Shiff
- Directed by: Grant Brown; Richard Jasek; David Cameron; Roger Hodgman; Colin Budds; Sally-Anne Kerr; Jeffrey Walker
- Starring: Andre de Vanny; Bridget Neval; Benjamin Schmideg; Emma Leonard; Brook Sykes; Saskia Burmeister; Robert van Mackelenberg; Geneviéve Picot; Greta Larkins
- Composers: Ric Formosa; Danny Beckermann
- Country of origin: Australia
- Original language: English
- No. of series: 2
- No. of episodes: 52 (list of episodes)

Production
- Executive producers: Jonathan M. Shiff; Kay Ben M'Rad
- Producers: Jonathan M. Shiff; Daniel Scharf
- Running time: 25 minutes
- Production companies: Jonathan M. Shiff Productions; ZDF; ZDF Enterprises; Network Ten Australia

Original release
- Network: Network Ten
- Release: 2 July 2004 – 6 April 2006

Wicked Science is an Australian television series, which debuted on 24 February 2004. The series focuses on Toby (played by André de Vanny) and Elizabeth (played by Bridget Neval), two teenagers who are mysteriously turned into wizards of science. The series was originally run on Network Ten from 2004 to 2006 of which it then moved to Disney Channel, Wicked Science has also screened on ABC1 and ABC2 on 7:00am, Thursday. On Disney Channel Asia, it was fully aired until 2007.

Toby and Elizabeth are two students in the same grade. Toby is a regular student and Elizabeth is really mean so nobody likes her. One day, a ray hits Toby and Elizabeth and they both acquire some scientific superpowers becoming geniuses. Toby is not really happy with his new gift, but Elizabeth wants to reveal using his powers to control the high school and Toby is the only one capable to stop her. The boring Sandy Bay school is now turned into a chaos with continuous unexplained events.

== Cast ==
=== Main ===
- André de Vanny as Toby Johnson, a normal teenager and the main protagonist who studies in Sandy Bay High School. He was one of two students involved in an accident following an experiment on a prehistoric rock, which caused him to become a genius. His best friends are Russell Skinner and Dina Demeris. He is also in love with Bianca, a pretty girl in his class.
- Bridget Neval as Elizabeth Hawke, the main antagonist) was also involved in the accident that turned Toby into a genius. Unlike Toby, she wants to use her newfound genius to take over the school. She dislikes everybody except Toby, whom she is secretly in love with. She is jealous and demonstrates that she will go to any length to get what she wants.
- Benjamin Schmideg as Russell "Russ" Skinner, Toby's best friend. He likes to skateboard and eat pizza. While not being too clever, he is a loyal and brave friend.
- Saskia Burmeister as Dina Demiris, a good friend to Toby and Russ. She is smart, good looking, boys get on her nerves sometimes and she hates Elizabeth. She goes to Hong Kong in Series 2 and is replaced by Sasha.
- Emma Leonard as Verity McGuire, Elizabeth's best friend since Primary School who often assists Elizabeth in her schemes. While she knows Elizabeth goes too far, she does not have the confidence to speak up.
- Brook Sykes as Garth King, the dimwitted school bully. He is often in cahoots with Elizabeth and acts as her spy. He is always up for a fight, especially if it involves Russ.
- Robert van Mackelenberg as Professor Carl Tesslar, the physics professor at Sandy Bay High School.
- Geneviève Picot as Principal Alexa Vyner, Sandy Bay High School's principal.
- Greta Larkins as Sacha Johnson, Toby's cousin, who moves to Sandy Bay in Series 2, the last Series of Wicked Science, before it was finished after the last episode.

=== Recurring ===
- Cleopatra Coleman as Emma Hellman (8 episodes)

=== Guests ===
- Alexander Cappelli as Shannon
- Benjamin McNair as Earl Hanley
- Bernard Curry as The Director
- Jeremy Stanford as Max
- Jessica Tovey as Nadine Sterling
- Louise Siversen as Elsa Bailey
- Michelle Vergara Moore as Miss Buckingham
- Nicholas Bell as Virgil

== Episodes ==
Series	Episodes	Premiere	Finale
1	26	2 July 2004	24 December 2004
2	26	19 August 2005	6 April 2006
