= The Lost World (TV series) =

American action/adventure television series

- Season one title card
- Genre: Action; Adventure; Science fantasy
- Based on: The Lost World by Arthur Conan Doyle
- Starring: Peter McCauley; Rachel Blakely; William Snow; David Orth; Jennifer O'Dell; Michael Sinelnikoff
- Countries of origin: Australia; United States; Canada (S1–S2)
- Original language: English
- No. of seasons: 3
- No. of episodes: 66 (list of episodes)

Production
- Executive producers: Greg Coote; Jeffrey Hayes; Guy Mullally; John Landis; Leslie Belzberg
- Producer: Darryl Sheen
- Running time: 40–44 minutes
- Production companies: Coote-Hayes Productions; Telescene (S1–S2); Action Adventure Network (S1–S2); St. Clare Entertainment (S1–S2); The Over the Hill Gang Productions (S3)

Original release
- Network: TNT (1999) (pilot); PPV/DirecTV (S1); Syndication (S2–S3)
- Release: 2 October 1999 – 13 May 2002

The Lost World (officially Sir Arthur Conan Doyle's The Lost World) is a syndicated television series loosely based on the 1912 novel by Sir Arthur Conan Doyle, The Lost World. The show premiered in the United States in autumn of 1999 (after the TV-movie/pilot aired in February on DirecTV and then on the cable television channel TNT in April). It ran for three seasons, the final two of which aired in syndication in the United States, before it was cancelled in 2002 after funding for a fourth season fell through. The final episode ended with an unresolved cliffhanger. All three seasons were released in DVD box sets in 2004.

== Plot ==
"At the dawn of the 20th century" a band of British adventurers, led by visionary scholar Professor George Challenger, embarks on an expedition to prove the existence of an isolated lost world. The group, some mismatched enthusiasts with less than selfless reasons for making the journey, consists of Challenger, his academic rival Professor Arthur Summerlee, financier Marguerite Krux, famed big-game hunter Major Lord John Richard Roxton, and journalist Edward T. Malone.

Their hot-air balloon crashes in the Amazon rainforest on an uncharted plateau where prehistoric creatures including dinosaurs and pterosaurs survive. The group is assisted by a virtuous jungle-savvy woman named Veronica Layton, whose parents disappeared eleven years before. Her family was part of a research group known to have vanished under mysterious circumstances. Together, the group fights to survive against carnivorous dinosaurs, sabre-toothed cats, fierce ape-people, savage cannibals, mad barbarians, brutal lizard people, dark magicians, vicious poachers and other perils as they search for a way to escape. Each episode detailed two separate, simultaneous adventures.

The later series established that the party became stranded in 1919.

== Episodes ==
Season	Episodes	Originally released	
Season	Episodes	First released	Last released
1	22	April 3, 1999	May 20, 2000
2	22	October 7, 2000	May 26, 2001
3	22	October 20, 2001	May 13, 2002

=== Proposed season 4 ===
The final episode of the third season ended with an unresolved cliffhanger.

The producers of the show have revealed some details of the proposed fourth and even fifth seasons from 2002. If the subsequent season had been produced, fans would have learned that Professor Arthur Summerlee was indeed alive, residing in Avalon. Avalon, near the border of the Plateau, is where Veronica's surviving mother Abigail Layton had become the Plateau's protector soon after her disappearance. She became the ruler of Avalon and had left behind a triangle artifact – the Trion, the Eye of Heaven – for her daughter Veronica to find. Veronica was to become the new Protector of the Plateau, standing in opposition to the line of Mordren, whose descendants intend to use the Plateau's power for evil. Her tree-house dwelling was apparently the epicenter of the entire Plateau.

The new season would have also revealed that Marguerite and Roxton were always meant to be together from the beginning. As Veronica is the new Protector of the Plateau, Marguerite is a descendant of Morrighan, a druid priestess who once served as "third power" within the Trion forces between the Protectors and the line of Mordren. As with her ancestor, Marguerite would have been a free will agent allowed to choose good or evil in the battle against power over the Plateau. Roxton, Marguerite's knight, protector, and future groom, would have been her personal guide so that Marguerite would ultimately choose "good". Because Morrighan's line descends from a child born to a Protector and the line of Mordren and Veronica's bloodline is of the Protectors, Veronica and Marguerite are cousins genetically, but spiritually are sisters. Roxton's role as Marguerite's modern day knight originates with his childhood and ancestral home having close proximity to Avebury, nearly twenty miles from Stonehenge. Finn would have been revealed to be Malone's great-great-granddaughter, her grandmother being the Amazon Phoebe (also played by Lara Cox) whom Malone had sex with in the episode "Amazons". The series would have been resolved with Malone and Veronica together as a couple and staying in Avalon, while Challenger uses his teleportation invention from the episode "Finn" to send himself, Roxton, Marguerite, and Summerlee to London, but travels forward in time to the year 2005 where they are warmly greeted by the Zoological Society of London due to Malone having sent them a letter explaining when they would arrive.

The fourth season would have featured guest appearances of two other Arthur Conan Doyle characters, Sherlock Holmes and Professor James Moriarty.

== Characters ==
=== Overview ===
Actor	Character	Seasons			
Actor	Character	Pilot	1	2	3
Peter McCauley	Professor George Edward Challenger	Main	Main	Main	Main
Rachel Blakely	Marguerite Krux	Main	Main	Main	Main
William Snow	Lord John Richard Roxton	Main	Main	Main	Main
David Orth	Edward 'Ned' T. Malone		Main (Note: Orth did not appear in the original two-hour pilot television film, but he does appear in the television series, starting with the first two episodes.)	Main	Special guest star (Note: While Orth appears with the other main cast in the show's opening title sequence in season 3, he is listed as a "Special guest star". Orth is last credited in the tenth episode of season 3, "Brothers In Arms". His third-season appearances were curtailed due to Australian tax laws.)
Jennifer O'Dell	Veronica Layton	Main	Main	Main	Main
Michael Sinelnikoff	Professor Arthur Summerlee	Main	Main	Guest	
William deVry	Ned Malone	Main (Note: William deVry and his character only appear in the original two-hour pilot television film. He does not appear in the television series.)			
Lara Cox	Finn				Special guest star (Note: Cox does not appear with the main cast in the show's opening, but is credited as a "Special guest star" after the show's opening title sequence. Cox's first crediting on the show is for the fifteenth episode of season 3, "Finn".)

=== Main ===
- Professor George Edward Challenger (portrayed by Peter McCauley) — A scholar, visionary, and adventurer who is the leader of the expedition. He hopes to prove his claims to the skeptical London Zoological Society.
- Marguerite Krux (portrayed by Rachel Blakely) — The selfish financier of the expedition and heiress to a fortune who goes along for her own reasons.
- Lord John Richard Roxton (portrayed by William Snow) — A nobleman with vast hunting experience, who accidentally killed his brother while trying to save him from an ape. He serves as protector of the group.
- Edward "Ned" T. Malone (portrayed by David Orth) — An American newspaper reporter, who joins the expedition hoping to make a name for himself.
- Veronica Layton (portrayed by Jennifer O'Dell) – A jungle girl whose parents disappeared eleven years prior to the series.
- Professor Arthur Summerlee (portrayed by Michael Sinelnikoff) — A scientist, and a colleague to George Challenger, who initially does not believe Challenger's claims about a lost world.
- Finn (portrayed by Lara Cox) – A young woman from the year 2033 who debuted in season 3. She joins the explorers in the past in hopes of preventing the post-apocalyptic future she lived in.

=== Supporting ===
- Assai (portrayed by Laura Vasquez) – The daughter of Jacoba, the leader of the Zanga Indian tribe. She is a childhood friend of Veronica.
- Tribune (portrayed by Jerome Ehlers) – The leader of a tribe of lizard men. He had different encounters with Challenger's group and has developed some respect for them, bordering on friendship.
- William Maple White (portrayed by Robert Coleby) – A scientist whose initial exploration of the plateau instigates Challenger to launch his own expedition of the plateau to obtain proof of the prehistoric creatures.

=== Plateau animals ===
There are various prehistoric animals and other species that live on the plateau, including:

- Tyrannosaurus
- Deinonychus
- Ankylosaurus – Ankylosaurus appears in "Cave of Fear", "Blood Lust" and "Paradise Found".
- Brontosaurus
- Giant Bee
- Dilophosaurus – Dilophosaurus appears in 'Blood Lust', 'Out of Time', 'The Beast Within', 'Absolute Power', 'Time After Time', 'Prodigal Father' and 'The Chosen One'.
- Parasaurolophus
- Plesiosaurus
- Pteranodon
- Smilodon – Smilodon would have originally appeared as a recurring animal, but was cut from the completed program. A dead Smilodon appeared in the episode "Blood Lust".
- Triceratops

== Broadcast ==
The first part of the series originally aired on Pay-per-view via DirecTV in the summer of 1999 before it aired in syndication. The original airing was uncensored, containing nudity and extended scenes. The syndicated version on TV and DVD releases are edited.

Following the limited run on PPV, the first broadcast TV run of the series ran weekly in syndication on hundreds of stations in the United States, including the WB 100+ group stations, a joint Time Warner and Tribune Broadcasting entity. Because of syndex rules each episode aired one week later on WGN America, and on the Space TV network in Canada. The series continued to be rerun in daily strip form in the United States on the Time Warner owned TNT in the early morning hours Monday through Friday.

=== International ===
In addition to the English language broadcasts in North America and Europe, the series has aired around the globe in other languages. The series aired in Europe on the SciFi Channel Europe. The series was also dubbed in Bengali in Bangladesh and was subsequently aired on ATN Bangla in 2009.

During the original run the weekly syndicated primary and backup satellite wildfeed for the series used the Galaxy 26 satellite located at 93° West longitude. As of 2022 the series is airing on South African channel SABC 3 on weekdays at around 01:00 in the early hours of the morning.

== DVD releases ==
The series was removed from the schedule after the DVD release in the United States after a third Time Warner company, New Line Television, sold the DVD region 1 distribution rights to Image Entertainment. The DVD region 2 distribution rights were sold to Liberation Entertainment.

Image Entertainment released all three seasons of The Lost World on DVD in Region 1 in NTSC. Liberation Entertainment released all three seasons on DVD in Region 2 in PAL.

The original 93-minute version pilot movie was released on DVD in 4:3 PAL under the title, The Lost World The Beginning by ILC Prime licensed by Fremantle Corporation.

Note: The pilot television movie was edited down into episodes 1 "The Journey Begins" & episode 2 "Stranded" for the TV series.

Season	Ep #	Aspect Ratio	R1 Release Date	R2 Release Date
Pilot	1–2	4:3		29 July 2002
1	22	4:3	27 January 2004	15 October 2007
2	22	4:3	20 April 2004	19 November 2007
3	22	16:9	16 November 2004	3 March 2008
