= List of science fiction television programs, C =

This is an inclusive list of science fiction television programs whose names begin with the letter C.

== C ==
Live-action

- Caminhos do Coração a.k.a. Paths of the Heart (franchise):
  - Caminhos do Coração a.k.a. Paths of the Heart (2007–2008, Brazil)
  - Os Mutantes: Caminhos do Coração a.k.a. The Mutants: Pathways of the Heart (2008–2009, Brazil, spin-off)
- Cape, The (1996–1997)
- Cape, The (2011) (elements of science fiction)
- Caprica (2010)
- Captain Midnight (1954–1958)
- Captain Scarlet (franchise):
  - Captain Scarlet and the Mysterons (1967–1968, UK, puppetry)
  - Captain Scarlet vs the Mysterons (1980, Captain Scarlet and the Mysterons compilation, puppetry, film)
  - Revenge of the Mysterons from Mars (1981, Captain Scarlet and the Mysterons compilation, puppetry, film)
- Captain Video and His Video Rangers (1949–1955)
- Captain Vyom – The Sky Warrior (1998–1999, India)
- Captain Z-Ro (1951–1956)
- Captain Zep – Space Detective (1983–1984, UK)
- Cavemen (2007) (elements of science fiction)
- Century City (2004–2005)
- Century Falls (1993, UK)
- Chameleon (franchise):
  - Chameleon (1998, film)
  - Chameleon II: Death Match (1999, film)
  - Chameleon 3: Dark Angel (2000, film)
- Chameleons (1989, pilot) IMDb
- Champions, The (1968–1969, UK)
- Changes, The (1975, UK)
- Charlie Jade (2005, Canada/South Africa)
- Children of the Dog Star (1984, New Zealand, miniseries)
- Children of the Stones (1977, UK, elements of science fiction)
- Chocky (1984–1985, UK)
- Chronicle, The (2001–2002) (elements of science fiction in some episodes)
- City Beneath the Sea (franchise):
  - Plateau of Fear (1961, UK) IMDb
  - City Beneath the Sea (1962, UK, Plateau of Fear sequel) IMDb
  - Secret Beneath the Sea (1963, UK, 1962 City Beneath the Sea sequel) IMDb
  - City Beneath the Sea (1971, film, pilot)
- City Cat (1993, Yugoslavia, film)
- Clangers (1969–1974, UK)
- Cleopatra 2525 (2000–2001)
- Cliffhangers (1979)
- Clifton House Mystery, The (1978)
- Clone (2008, UK)
- Code 404 (2020–2022, UK)
- Code Name: Eternity (1999–2000, Canada)
- Codename Icarus (1981)
- Collector, The a.k.a. Sakupljac (2005–2006, Serbia, anthology)
- Colony (2015-2018)
- Come Back Mrs. Noah (1977–1978, UK)
- Commando Cody: Sky Marshall of the Universe (1955)
- Continuum (2012–2015, Canada)
- Counterpart (2017-2019)
- Counterstrike (1969, UK)
- Cowboy Bebop (2021)
- Crash – Truslen fra det sorte hul a.k.a. Crash – The Menace from the Black Hole (1984, Denmark)
- Crime Traveller (1997, UK)
- Crossing, The (2018)
- Cybergirl (2001–2002, Australia)
- Cybersix (1995, Argentina)

Animated

- C.O.P.S. (1988, animated)
- Cadillacs and Dinosaurs (1993–1994, animated)
- Captain Earth (2014, Japan, animated)
- Captain Future a.k.a. Capitaine Flam (France), a.k.a. Capitan Futuro (Italy), a.k.a. Capitán Futuro (Spain/Latin America), a.k.a. Knight of Space, The (Arabic) (1978–1979, Japan, animated)
- Captain Harlock (franchise):
  - Space Pirate Captain Harlock (1978–1979, Japan, animated)
  - Galaxy Express 999 (1978–1981, Japan, animated)
  - Space Symphony Maetel (2004–2005, Japan, Galaxy Express 999 sequel, animated)
  - Space Pirate Captain Herlock: The Endless Odyssey (2002, Japan, animated)
  - Harlock Saga (1998–1999, Japan, animated)
  - Arcadia of My Youth: Endless Orbit SSX (1982–1983, Japan, animated)
  - Queen Emeraldas (1998–1999, Japan, animated)
  - Captain Harlock and the Queen of a Thousand Years (1985–1986, US/Japan, animated)
  - Queen Millennia (1981–1982, Japan, animated)
- Captain Planet and the Planeteers (1993–1996, animated)
- Captain Power and the Soldiers of the Future (1987–1988, Canada/US, partly animated)
- Captain Scarlet (franchise):
  - New Captain Scarlet (2005, UK, animated)
- Captain Simian & the Space Monkeys (1996–1997, animated)
- Captain Star (1997–1998, UK/Canada/Spain, animated)
- Cars Toons: Mater's Tall Tales (2008–2012, animated) (elements of science fiction in the Unidentified Flying Mater episode)
- Casshern (franchise):
  - Casshern Sins (2008–2009, Japan, animated, Neo-Human Casshern reboot)
  - Neo-Human Casshern (1973–1974, Japan, animated)
- Centurions, The (1985–1987, animated)
- Chargeman Ken! (1973, Japan, animated)
- Chō Kōsoku Galvion (1984, Japan, animated)
- Chobits (2002, Japan, animated)
- Chōdenji Machine Voltes V (1977–1978, Japan, animated)
- Chōdenji Robo Combattler V (1976–1977, Japan, animated)
- Chojin Sentai Barattack (1977–1978, Japan, animated)
- Chrome Shelled Regios (2009, Japan, animated)
- Cleopatra in Space (2019-current, animated)
- Cobra (franchise):
  - Space Cobra (1982–1983, Japan, animated)
  - Cobra the Animation: Rokunin no Yushi (2010, Japan, animated)
- Code-E (franchise):
  - Code-E (2007, Japan, animated)
  - Mission-E (2008, Japan, animated)
- Code Geass (franchise):
  - Code Geass: Lelouch of the Rebellion a.k.a. Code Geass (2006–2007, Japan, animated)
  - Code Geass: Lelouch of the Rebellion R2 (2008, Japan, animated)
- Code Lyoko (franchise):
  - Garage Kids (2001, France/US, Code Lyoko pilot, animated)
  - Code Lyoko (2003–2007, France, animated)
  - Code Lyoko: Evolution (2012–2013, France, partly animated)
- Colonel Bleep (1957–1960, United States, animated)
- Combat Mecha Xabungle (1982–1983, Japan, animated)
- Coppelion (2013, Japan, animated)
- Cosmic Quantum Ray (2009, Germany, animated)
- Cosmo Warrior Zero (2001, Japan, animated)
- Courage the Cowardly Dog (1999–2002, animated) (elements of science fiction in some episodes)
- Cowboy Bebop (1998–1999, Japan, animated)
- Coyote Ragtime Show (2006, Japan, animated)
- Crest of the Stars Trilogy (franchise):
  - Crest of the Stars (1999, Japan, animated)
  - Banner of the Stars (2001, Japan, animated)
  - Banner of the Stars II (2001, Japan, animated)
- Cubix (2001–2003, South Korea, animated) a.k.a. Cubix: Robots for Everyone (US)
- Cybersix (1999, Canada/Argentina, animated)
- Cyborg 009 (franchise):
  - Cyborg 009 (1968, Japan, animated)
  - Cyborg 009 (1979–1980, Japan, animated)
  - Cyborg 009 (2001–2002, Japan, animated)
