= Jerome Ehlers =

Australian actor

- Born: Jerome Francis Ehlers; 20 December 1958; Perth, Western Australia, Australia
- Died: 9 August 2014 (aged 55); Sydney, New South Wales, Australia
- Education: University of Western Australia
- Occupations: Actor, writer
- Years active: 1987–2014
- Spouse(s): Emily Simpson (1988–1993) (divorced) (1 child); Elly Bradbury (2001–2014) (his death) (1 child)
- Children: 2

Jerome Ehlers (20 December 1958 – 9 August 2014) was an Australian actor and writer.

== Early life ==
Ehlers was born in Perth, Western Australia to Francis Charles Ehlers and his wife Berenice Margaret Franklyn Ehlers. He went to school in Perth and then lived in Floreat, Curtin, Western Australia, from 1977. He was a resident of St. Thomas More College in Perth, during the mid-1970s. He graduated from University of Western Australia in 1987. He then graduated from the National Institute of Dramatic Art (NIDA) alongside his future wife, actress Emily Simpson in 1987.

== Career ==
Ehlers made his acting debut as Captain Watkin Tench in 1987 miniseries Frontier, alongside Max Cullen, Ruth Cracknell, and Robert Coleby.

Early television credits include the miniseries True Believers (1988), Body Surfer (1989), Darlings of the Gods (1989) and Bangkok Hilton (1989) – the latter alongside Nicole Kidman in her breakout role.

He made further television appearances in Shadows of the Heart (1990), A Country Practice (1992), New Zealand series Marlin Bay (1992), Time Trax (1993), Fire (1996), Flipper (1995-1996), Heartbreak High (1996), Water Rats (1998), Stingers (1999) and Sir Arthur Conan Doyle’s The Lost World (1999-2002).

Various roles followed in the 2000s with Tales of the South Seas (2000), British drama series Ballykissangel (2001), fantasy series BeastMaster (2001), Jeopardy (2002), miniseries Through My Eyes (2004), long-running medical drama All Saints (2006), Monarch Cove (2006), US miniseries The Starter Wife (2007), Packed to the Rafters (2008-2009), East of Everything (2009) and Sea Patrol (2010). He played the role of Rhys Kowalski in 2011 legal series Crownies for 22 episodes. He made his later appearances in House Husbands (2012-2013) and Rake (2014).

Ehlers also appeared in numerous films including western film Quigley Down Under (1990) alongside Tom Selleck, Weekend with Kate (1990), erotic thriller Fatal Bond (1991), US thriller Irresistible Force (1993) and cult crime drama Two Hands (1999) alongside Heath Ledger, Bryan Brown and Rose Byrne.

Further film credits include adventure drama The Old Man Who Read Love Stories (2001), horror film Cubbyhouse (2001), bushranger drama Ned Kelly (2003) alongside Heath Ledger and Orlando Bloom, war film The Great Raid (2005) opposite James Franco and Benjamin Bratt, and US action film The Marine (2006). He also appears in many made-for-television films. Ehlers' final film before his death was Drive Hard (2014).

== Death ==
Ehlers died in Sydney on 9 August 2014, at age 55, ten months after being diagnosed with colorectal cancer.

== Filmography ==
=== Film ===
Year	Title	Role	Notes
1990	Quigley Down Under	Coogan	Feature film
1990	Weekend with Kate	Jon Thorne	Feature film
1991	Deadly	Sergeant Tony Bourke	Feature film
1993	Fatal Bond	Joe Martinez	Feature film
1995	Swinger	Macmillan	Short film
1999	Two Hands	Busker	Feature film
1999	Change of Heart	Harvey Tate	
2000	After the Rain	Michael Silvagni	Feature film
2001	The Old Man Who Read Love Stories	Gringo	Feature film
2001	Cubbyhouse	Harrison / Harlow	Feature film
2003	Ned Kelly	Sherritt Trooper	Feature film
2005	The Great Raid	Colonel H. White	Feature film
2006	The Marine	Detective Van Buren	Feature film
2012	My Mind's Own Melody	Doctor	Short film
2014	Drive Hard	Bank Chairman	Feature film (final film role)

=== Television ===
Year	Title	Role	Notes
1988	True Believers		TV miniseries
1989	Bodysurfer	Mooney Mooney Youth	TV miniseries
1989	Darlings of the Gods	Peter Finch	TV movie
1989	Bangkok Hilton	Arkie Ragan	TV miniseries
1990	Shadows of the Heart	Father Michael Hanlon	TV movie
1992	A Country Practice	Grant Williams	TV series, episodes: "Nothing But the Truth: Part 1" "Nothing But the Truth: Part 2"
1993	The Feds: Obsession	Cal Woods	TV movie
1993	Time Trax	Nigel Felsham	TV series, episode: "The Price of Honor"
1993	Irresistible Force	Kurt	TV movie
1993	The Flood: Who Will Save Our Children?	Ray Masterman	TV movie
1994	Marlin Bay	Christian Beckett	TV series
1995	Sahara	Capt. Halliday	TV movie
1995	Glad Rags	Graeme Marsden	TV series, 13 episodes
1995	Flipper	Poacher	TV series, episode: "With Brothers Like This"
1996	Fire	Vulture	TV series, episode: "Vendetta II"
1996	Heartbreak High	Max Harrison	TV series, episode: "4.23"
1997	Frontier	Captain Watkin Tench	TV miniseries
1997	Kangaroo Palace	Simon Seymour	TV movie
1998	Water Rats	Peter Klein	TV series, episode: "Switchback"
1998	Chameleon	'Maddy' Madison	TV movie
1999	Chameleon II: Death Match	Erickson	TV movie
1999	Witch Hunt	Detective Jack Maitland	TV movie
1999	Stingers	Frank Manscuro	TV series, episode: "House Rules"
1999–2001	The Lost World	Tribune, François Locke / Olmec	TV series, 5 episodes
2000	Tales of the South Seas	Villain	TV series, episode: "Lessons for a Warrior"
2000	Virtual Nightmare		TV movie
2001	Ballykissangel	Barry	TV series, episode: "Getting Better All the Time"
2001	BeastMaster	Dagan	TV series, episode: "Game of Death"
2001	Child Star: The Shirley Temple Story	John Ford	TV movie
2001	The Wilde Girls	Toby	TV movie
2002	Jeopardy	Joe (diamond thief)	TV series, 3 episodes
2002	Seconds to Spare	Emmett Larkin	TV movie
2002	Counterstrike	Captain Kevin Blake	TV movie
2004	Through My Eyes	Odontologist Ken Brown	TV movie
2006	Fatal Contact: Bird Flu in America	Chad Sinclair	TV movie
2006	All Saints	Richard Reinheart	TV series, episode: "Drawing the Line"
2006	Monarch Cove	Sam Lee	TV series, episode: "1.6"
2007	The Starter Wife	Director	TV miniseries
2008–2009	Packed to the Rafters	Tony Westaway	TV series, 3 episodes
2010	Sea Patrol	Peter	TV series, episode: "Paradise Lost"
2011	Crownies	Rhys Kowalski	TV series, 22 episodes
2012	House Husbands	David	TV series, episode: "1.9"
2014	Rake	Maitre d'	TV series
