= Season Hubley =

American actress (born 1951)

- Hubley in 1978
- Born: March 14, 1951 (age 75)
- Occupation: Actress
- Years active: 1972–1999
- Spouse: Kurt Russell (m. 1979; div. 1983)
- Children: 1

Season Hubley (born March 14, 1951) is an American retired actress, best known as Nikki in Hardcore (1979), Priscilla Presley in Elvis (1979), and Angelique in All My Children (1992–1994).

== Career ==
Hubley was steadily active, in film, and on television, from her first 1972 appearance in the eponymous lead role in the television film Bobby Jo and the Good Time Band, through to her final 1999 appearance in a guest-starring role on the episode "Wreck of the Zephyr" of the television series Flipper.

In television, she made an appearance on The Partridge Family in 1972 playing the part of a princess. In 1977, she appeared in an episode of Kojak as a nun whose sister was murdered. She had a continuing role in the evening TV drama Family, guest-starring in several episodes in 1976 and 1977 as Salina Magee, the love interest of teenage dropout Willie Lawrence. She also co-starred in an episode of Starsky & Hutch, "Starsky's Lady", in which she was Starsky's fiancée. From 1991 to 1994, she portrayed Angelique Marick on the daytime drama All My Children. She appeared in Stepfather III and Child in the Night, both in 1990.

Hubley appeared in a mix of supporting and lead roles through the 1970s. In 1973, she played the title character in Lolly-Madonna XXX, also known as The Lolly Madonna War, around whom the story revolved. She co-starred in the 1979 film Hardcore. She appeared briefly in Escape from New York (1981), with her husband Kurt Russell. Her other major film role is in the 1982 cult film Vice Squad, in which she played a prostitute named Princess. A notable role for Hubley was her lead performance as Priscilla Presley in the 1979 made-for-television film Elvis.

== Personal life ==
Hubley was married to actor Kurt Russell from 1979 to 1983. They have a son named Boston (b. February 16, 1980).

== Filmography ==
Film
Year	Title	Role	Notes
1973	Lolly-Madonna XXX	Lolly Madonna	
1974	Catch My Soul	Desdemona	
1979	Hardcore	Niki	
1981	Escape from New York	Girl in Chock full o'Nuts	
1982	Vice Squad	"Princess"/Carla	
1985	The Key to Rebecca	Alaney Fontana	
1987	Prettykill	Heather Todd	
1989	Caddie Woodlawn	Harriet Woodlawn	
1991	Total Exposure	Andi Robinson	
1992	Stepfather III	Jennifer Ashley	
1998	Children of the Corn V: Fields of Terror	Lily's Mother	
1998	Kiss the Sky	Beth	

Television
Year	Title	Role	Notes
1972	Bobby Jo and the Good Time Band	Bobby Jo	TV movie (unsold pilot)
1972	The Partridge Family	The Princess Jennie	Episode: "Princess and the Partridge"
1973	She Lives!	Pam Rainey	ABC Movie of the Week
1974	The Healers	Ann Kilmer	TV film
1974	Kung Fu	Margit Kingsley McLean	2 episodes
1975	The Rookies	Kim Owens	Episode: "A Time to Mourn"
1976–1977	Family	Salina Magee	4 episodes
1977	Starsky & Hutch	Terry Roberts	Episode: "Starsky's Lady"
1977	SST: Death Flight	Anne Redding	TV movie
1977	Westside Medical	Nan Cousins	Episode: "The Sound of Sunlight"
1977	Kojak	Sister Maria	Episode: "Sister Maria"
1977	Visions	Sara Blakemore	Episode: "All I Could See from Where I Stood"
1978	Loose Change	Tanya Berenson	TV miniseries
1979	Elvis	Priscilla Presley	TV movie
1979	Mrs. R's Daughter	Ellie Pruitt	TV movie
1983	A Caribbean Mystery	Molly Kendall	TV movie
1984	The Three Wishes of Billy Grier	Phyllis	TV movie
1985	The Key to Rebecca	Elene Fontana	TV movie
1985	The Twilight Zone	Carol Shelton	Episode: "Little Boy Lost"
1985	Alfred Hitchcock Presents	Lena Trent	Episode: "Final Escape"
1986	Hammer House of Mystery and Suspense	Cora Berlaine	Episode: "Black Carrion"
1986	Under the Influence	Ann Talbot Simpson	TV movie
1986	Christmas Dove	Melissa	TV movie
1987	The Hitchhiker	Miranda	Episode: "Cabin Fever"
1988	Shakedown on the Sunset Strip	Officer Audre Davis	TV movie
1988	Blue Skies	Annie Pfeiffer Cobb	TV series
1990	Unspeakable Acts	Jackie Harrison	TV movie
1990	Murder, She Wrote	Marla Bryce	Episode: "If the Shoe Fits"
1990	Child in the Night	Valerie Winfield	TV movie
1990	Vestige of Honor	Marilyn	TV movie
1991	CBS Schoolbreak Special	Barbara McBride	Episode: "But He Loves Me"
1992	Steel Justice	Gina Morelli	TV movie
1992–1994	All My Children	Angelique Voynitzheva Marick	150 episodes
1993	South of Sunset	Janice Redding	Episode: "Satyricon"
1996	No One Would Tell	Rita Thompson	TV movie
1996	Humanoids from the Deep	Timmy's Mother	TV movie
1998	Beverly Hills, 90210	Ms. Evans	Episode: "Law and Disorder"
1999	Flipper	Sarah Gorban	Episode: "Wreck of the Zephyr"
