= Monarch Cove =

Television series

- Directed by: Ian Barry; Peter Andrikidis; Di Drew; Ian Gilmour; Andrew Prowse; Marcus Cole
- Starring: Virginia Williams; Kieren Hutchison; Samantha Shelton; Robert Coleby; Rachel Ward
- Composer: Martin Davich
- Country of origin: United States
- Original language: English
- No. of seasons: 1
- No. of episodes: 14

Production
- Running time: 60 minutes
- Production company: Fremantle

Original release
- Network: Lifetime
- Release: November 4 – November 16, 2006

Monarch Cove is a prime time telenovela that premiered on Lifetime on November 4, 2006. It ran for a single season of 14 episodes ending on December 16, 2006.

== Premise ==
After serving six years in jail for the murder of her father, wrongfully accused Bianca Foster (Virginia Williams) returns to her hometown, Monarch Cove, only to discover new family problems brewing. In a quest to help, she takes a job at a resort, and inadvertently becomes romantically involved with the heir to the business, Jake Preston (Kieren Hutchison), who is engaged to be married.

== Cast ==
=== Main / regular ===
- Virginia Williams as Bianca Foster
- Samantha Shelton as Kathy Foster
- Shirley Jones as Grace Foster
- Matt Funke as Ben Foster
- Kieren Hutchison as Jake Preston
- Robert Coleby as Alexander Preston
- Rachel Ward as Arianna Preston
- Vanessa Lengies as Sophia Preston
- Simon Rex as Eddie Lucas
- Samantha Healy as Elizabeth DeBrett
- Stephen Martines as Parker Elian
- Craig Horner as Caleb Demanser

=== Guests ===
- James Stewart as Davey Monroe
- Jerome Ehlers as Sam Lee
- Kodi Smit-McPhee as Young Jake
- Lani Tupu as Joe
- Maeve Dermody as Charlotte Lee
- Matt Okine as Carlos
- Renai Caruso as Megan
- Sarah Chadwick as Vanessa Reade
- Tiffany Lamb as Dr Martuccio

== Episodes ==
No.	Title	Directed by	Written by	Original release date
1	"Episode #1.1"	Unknown	Unknown	4 November 2006
Bianca Foster returns to her home town after she is cleared of committing her father's murder, but plenty has changed in the time she's been gone.
2	"Episode #1.2"	Unknown	Unknown	4 November 2006
Bianca is questioned in relation to another murder. Jake neglects fiance Elizabeth to help Bianca, Kathy vows revenge against Eddie, and Ben learns of a lie told to protect him.
3	"Episode #1.3"	Unknown	Unknown	11 November 2006
Jake realises he must break his news to Bianca, Kathy's schemes could turn deadly, a mysterious woman comes to stay at the resort, and Sophia regrets her actions.
4	"Episode #1.4"	Unknown	Unknown	11 November 2006
Jake seeks comfort with Bianca on the eve of his wedding, a stranger with a shocking secret arrives at the resort, Sophia sets someone up, and Kathy enters into a deal.
5	"Episode #1.5"	Unknown	Unknown	18 November 2006
Bianca is faced with a bombshell, Eddie investigates Parker, and Jake deals with constant interruptions while on his honeymoon.
6	"Episode #1.6"	Unknown	Unknown	18 November 2006
Jake arrives home early from his honeymoon, the gaming license is in jeopardy, Bianca and Eddie begin a romantic relationship, and Parker is revealed.
7	"Episode #1.7"	Unknown	Unknown	24 November 2006
The casino opens amidst much drama, and Kathy's past comes back to haunt her.
8	"Episode #1.8"	Unknown	Unknown	25 November 2006
Grace visits the doctor and the news leaves her reeling, Kathy must interact with Victor for business, and Arianna leaves in lieu of her health.
9	"Episode #1.9"	Unknown	Unknown	1 December 2006
Kathy engages in a dangerous game with Parker and Victor, Eddie develops strong feelings, Ben makes plans, and Elizabeth feels neglected.
10	"Episode #1.10"	Unknown	Unknown	2 December 2006
Elizabeth feels neglected, Kathy makes a move, new evidence is uncovered in the murder investigation, and Sophia travels to Palm Springs.
11	"Episode #1.11"	Unknown	Unknown	8 December 2006
Kathy's honesty puts Elizabeth in danger, Bianca searches for Straker's widow, and Kathy's dishonesty helps Parker.
12	"Episode #1.12"	Unknown	Unknown	9 December 2006
Further secrets are revealed, Ben regrets letting Sophia get away, and Kathy is put in danger.
13	"Episode #1.13"	Unknown	Unknown	15 December 2006
Parker gives Kathy a deadline, Alexander is arrested, and Bianca investigates a clue.
14	"Episode #1.14"	Unknown	Unknown	16 December 2006
Mysteries are solved and hearts are broken.

== Production ==
The series is based on the German serial Bianca – Wege zum Glück (Bianca: Paths to Happiness). It was produced by FremantleMedia North America, a sister company of UFA, which produced the original.

It was shot on the Gold Coast in Queensland, Australia.

The Lifetime network initially ordered 20 episodes of the series, but ultimately reduced it to 14, after ratings for the show dropped significantly from the premiere.
