= List of television films produced for UPN =

During the late 1990s, United Paramount Network produced a number of television films branded "Blockbuster Shockwave Cinema," in conjunction with sponsor (and sister company) Blockbuster Video. Almost all were science fiction films, and likewise, their after-airing availability on home video was exclusive to Blockbuster stores. From UPN's inception until 2000, the network also offered a hosted movie series called the UPN Movie Trailer to their stations. The show featured mostly older Hollywood action and comedy films, often those made by Paramount Pictures. Movie Trailer was discontinued in 2000 to give stations that opted for them room for a second weekend run of Star Trek: Enterprise and America's Next Top Model (and later, Veronica Mars). There were also three Paramount-branded blocks on the company's owned-and-operated stations ("O&Os") only: Paramount Teleplex as the main brand for movies at any given timeslot, Paramount Prime Movie for primetime features, and the Paramount Late Movie on late nights.

This is a brief list of television films produced for UPN, an American broadcast television network:

Year	Film	Notes
1995	The Shamrock Conspiracy	
1996	Harrison: Cry of the City	
1996	Star Command	Alternatively titled In the Fold.
1998	30 Years to Life	
1998	Alien Abduction: Incident in Lake County	
1998	Chameleon	
1998	Dream House	
1998	I Married a Monster	
1998	Inferno	
1998	Lost In the Bermuda Triangle	
1998	Lost Souls	
1998	Riddler's Moon	
1998	The Warlord: Battle for the Galaxy	
1999	Airtight	
1999	Avalon: Beyond the Abyss	
1999	Chameleon II: Death Match	
1999	The Cyber-stalking	Alternatively titled The Cyberstalking.
1999	The Darwin Conspiracy	
1999	Dying to Live	
1999	Escape from Mars	
1999	Killer Deal	
1999	The Last Man on Planet Earth	
1999	Monster!	
1999	Roswell: The Aliens Attack	
1999	Survivor	
2000	Alien Fury: Countdown to Invasion	
2000	Code Name Phoenix	
2000	Chameleon 3: Dark Angel	
2000	Code Red: The Rubicon Conspiracy	
2000	Max Knight: Ultra Spy	
2000	Virtual Nightmare	
2001	Abazi Avni: The Life of a Land	
2001	Curse of the Talisman	
2002	What About Your Friends: Weekend Getaway	
2004	The Mania of WrestleMania	
