= Tiffany Lamb =

Australian model, actress and TV presenter

- Born: 22 September 1966 (age 59)
- Occupations: Actress; model; tv presenter
- Known for: Perfect Match; Flipper – The New Adventures; Paradise Beach

Tiffany Lamb (born 22 September 1966) is an Australian model, actress, and TV presenter. She is best known for co-hosting Perfect Match, and starring in Flipper – The New Adventures and Paradise Beach.

== Career ==
Lamb was a co-host on Perfect Match alongside Greg Evans in 1986. She guested in various television serials, including Rafferty's Rules, The Flying Doctors, and Home and Away. She also appeared in the late 1980s reboot of the Mission: Impossible television series. In 1990, she starred in the American action adventure series E.A.R.T.H. Force, which was cancelled after six episodes.

In 1992, Lamb had a recurring role in long-running soap opera Neighbours as Jacqueline Summers. From 1993 until 1994, she played Lisa Whitman in the Nine Network soap opera Paradise Beach. In 1994, she presented TVTV on the ABC, a series that explored television trends. From 1997, Lamb starred in the American series Flipper, which was filmed in Queensland.

== Filmography ==
=== Film ===
Year	Title	Role	Notes
1990	Breakaway	Tanya	also known as Escape from Madness
1993	Body Melt	Secretary	
2006	See No Evil	Hannah	US/Australia
2009	Daybreakers	News Reader	US/Australia
2011	A Heartbeat Away	Tracy	

=== Television ===
Year	Title	Role	Notes
1985–1987	It's a Knockout	Referee	
1986–1988	Perfect Match	Co-host	
1988	Aaron's Way	CeeJay	Episode: "The Harvest Pilot Part 2"
1988	Home and Away	Stacey	Guest role
1988	Tender Loving Care		TV pilot
1989	Rafferty's Rules	Liz	Episode: "The Book of Love"
1989	The Flying Doctors	Louise	Episode: "The Adventure"
1989	Mission: Impossible	Lucy	Episode: "The Devils"
1990	Mission: Impossible	Girl	Episode: "The Sands of Seth"
1990	E.A.R.T.H. Force	Catherine Romano	
1991	Chances	Brandy	Episode: "Flesh for Fantasy"
1992	Lift Off		
1992	Neighbours	Jacqueline Summers	Recurring role
1993	Time Trax	Megan Edwards	Episode: "Darien Comes Home"
1993	The Elite		
1993–1994	Paradise Beach	Lisa Whitman	Series regular
1994	TVTV	Host	
1997–1998	The New Adventures of Flipper	Lt. Cmdr. Alexandra Parker-Hampton	Series regular
2000	The Lost World	Barb Dillon	Episode: "Tourist Season"
2006	Monarch Cove	Dr. Martuccio	Episode 1.1
2007	The Starter Wife	Barbara	Episode: "Hour 1"
2007–2008	H2O: Just Add Water	Annette	Recurring role
2008	Farmkids	MooLoo	Voice role
