= Virtual Nightmare =

- Written by: Dan Mazur; David Tausik
- Directed by: Michael Pattinson
- Starring: Michael Muhney; Tasma Walton; Todd MacDonald
- Country of origin: United States
- Original language: English

Production
- Production companies: Coote/Hayes Productions; Paramount Television

Original release
- Network: UPN
- Release: April 14, 2000

Virtual Nightmare is a 2000 made-for-TV horror film directed by Michael Pattinson and starring Michael Muhney, Tasma Walton, and Todd MacDonald. The film premiered on UPN on April 14, 2000. The story was conceived in 1995 when writer David Tausik read the Philip K. Dick novel Time Out of Joint.

== Cast ==
- Michael Muhney as Dale Hunter
- Tasma Walton as Wendy
- Bob Hornery as Stan
- Mitchell Butel as Miller
- Todd MacDonald as Bob
- Jerome Ehlers
- Peter Curtin as Andrew
- John Noble as Dad
- Zoe Naylor as

== Plot ==
In the future the world has seemingly reached perfection. Dale Hunter, a junior advertising executive, begins to question the nature of his reality when he is in a car accident and glitches start to appear in his vision. Seeking help from the local librarian, Wendy, the two discover that there are many things about their world, and indeed their lives, that do not hold up to close scrutiny. Dale makes repeated attempts to escape from the confines of the world he has known, with varying results.

== Reception ==
John Ferguson of the Radio Times remarked "There are shades of The Matrix in this modest but rewarding sci-fi thriller."

== See also ==
- List of television films produced for UPN
