= Hail Caesar (1994 film) =

1994 film by Anthony Michael Hall

- Directed by: Anthony Michael Hall
- Written by: Robert Mittenthal
- Produced by: Barry L. Collier; Steven Paul
- Starring: Anthony Michael Hall; Robert Downey Jr. Frank Gorshin; Samuel L. Jackson; Judd Nelson; Nicholas Pryor; Leslie Danon; Bobbie Phillips; Kane Picoy
- Cinematography: Adam Kane
- Edited by: Jack Tucker
- Music by: Roger Tallman
- Distributed by: Prism Entertainment Corporation
- Release date: May 11, 1994
- Running time: 97 minutes
- Country: United States
- Language: English

Hail Caesar is a 1994 comedy film directed by Anthony Michael Hall in his directorial debut. The film stars Hall, Samuel L. Jackson, Robert Downey Jr., Bobbie Phillips, and Judd Nelson. The film follows Julius Caesar McGruder, a would-be rock star who makes a bet with his girlfriend's father to be able to continue dating her. The film is based on an original story by Mark Twain.

== Plot ==
Julius Caesar McGruder is practicing with his band, “Hail Caesar'', with his friends Annie and Wlad. They stop after Julius’s dog attacks the mailman. In the mail, Julius learns that he is being kicked out of California University after not being able to meet their academic eligibility requirements. Julius then decides to focus on his band full time and leaves to pick up his girlfriend, Buffer.

On their date, Julius tells Buffer that he can’t make it to her party due to practice with his band but is persuaded by her to go. At the party, Buffer’s father, Mr. Bidwell, clearly explains to Julius how much he doesn’t like him and offers him money to stay away from his daughter. Julius rejects the offer and expresses his love for Buffer and that he’ll do anything to stay with her. Mr. Bidwell then proposes a bet to Julius: if he can make $100,000 in six months, then he can continue dating his daughter. If he doesn’t, he will have to stay away from her forever. He will even give Julius a job at his pencil eraser factory as part of the bet. Julius accepts.

On the first day of his job, Julius meets the factory’s manager, Pete Dewitt, and is automatically disliked by his coworkers. Dewitt discovers a file on one of the computers named “Big Pink” and demands to know what’s in the file from Bidwell’s assistant, Remora, who then kills him. During a call between Remora and Mr. Bidwell, they decide to make Julius the new factory manager because they believe the clueless Julius won’t find out what “Big Pink” is. Julius and his band decide to make a demo and find a record label that will offer them a contract. Julius meets Jerry, a record executive, only to find out that Jerry is actually just a mailroom clerk.

After learning that Julius has found out about “Big Pink”, Bidwell and Remora decide to blow up the factory and blame it on Julius. He gets arrested, but is bailed out by Annie. When Julius returns to his home, he learns that the Venus de Milo statue he owns is real and worth a fortune. Buffer and her father learn of this and try to reconcile with Julius, but he gets Bidwell and Remora arrested and rejects Buffer for Annie. Jerry finds Julius and tells him he has become a music agent and offers the band a recording contract.

== Cast ==
- Anthony Michael Hall as Julius Caesar McGruder
- Bobbie Phillips as Buffer
- Leslie Danon as Annie
- Nicholas Pryor as Bidwell
- Kane Picoy as Remora
- Samuel L. Jackson as Mailman
- Ilia Volok as Wlad
- Robert Downey Jr. as Jerry
- Frank Gorshin as Pete Dewitt
- Judd Nelson as Prisoner One
- Robert Downey Sr. as Butler

== Production ==
The film was shot in Los Angeles, California, USA.
