= Hardcore (1979 film) =

1979 American crime drama film by Paul Schrader

- Theatrical release poster
- Directed by: Paul Schrader
- Written by: Paul Schrader
- Produced by: Buzz Feitshans
- Starring: George C. Scott; Peter Boyle; Season Hubley
- Cinematography: Michael Chapman
- Edited by: Tom Rolf
- Music by: Jack Nitzsche
- Production company: A-Team Productions
- Distributed by: Columbia Pictures
- Release date: February 9, 1979
- Running time: 108 minutes
- Country: United States
- Language: English

Hardcore (released in the UK as The Hardcore Life) is a 1979 American neo-noir thriller crime drama film written and directed by Paul Schrader, and starring George C. Scott, Peter Boyle, Season Hubley, and Dick Sargent. The plot follows a conservative Midwestern businessman whose teenage daughter goes missing in California. With the help of a prostitute, his search leads him into the illicit subculture of pornography, including snuff films.

Schrader, who had previously written the screenplay for Martin Scorsese's Taxi Driver (1976), began developing Hardcore with executive producer John Milius the same year for Warner Bros. After Warner Bros. bought out Schrader's contract and took control of the project, Warren Beatty became attached as the star and producer. However, creative clashes between Beatty and Schrader led to Beatty's departure from the production. Following this, Scott was cast in the lead role. The film was shot on location in several California cities, including Los Angeles, San Diego, and San Francisco, as well as in Schrader's hometown of Grand Rapids, Michigan.

Hardcore was released on February 9, 1979 by Columbia Pictures. It was nominated for the Golden Bear at the 29th Berlin International Film Festival. Upon its initial release, the film received somewhat mixed reviews, but retrospective assessments have been more positive.

== Plot ==
In December 1977, Jake Van Dorn, a devout Calvinist businessman and single father from Grand Rapids, Michigan, faces a parent's worst nightmare when his teenage daughter, Kristen, vanishes during a church-sponsored trip to Bellflower, California. Months pass with no leads until May 1978, when Andy Mast, a brash private investigator from Los Angeles, presents Van Dorn with shocking evidence: an 8 mm stag film purchased in a Los Angeles sex shop, depicting Kristen engaged in a sexual act with two men. Horrified, Van Dorn becomes convinced his daughter has been kidnapped and forced into pornography.

Flying to Los Angeles, Van Dorn confronts Mast, only to find him distracted by a porn star he was meant to investigate. Disgusted, Van Dorn fires him and takes matters into his own hands. He plunges into the city's seedy underbelly, visiting peep shows, brothels, and adult stores, but his rigid morals clash with the exploitative world he encounters. Frustrated by the LAPD's indifference, he poses as a pornography producer, placing an ad in the Los Angeles Free Press to lure potential informants.

Respondents flood his motel room, including "Jism Jim," a disheveled actor from the stag film. After a violent interrogation, Jim directs Van Dorn to Niki, a streetwise prostitute who claims to know Kristen's whereabouts. Though wary, Van Dorn pays Niki to guide him through California's porn circuit. Unbeknownst to him, his brother-in-law Wes rehires Mast, who tails the pair as their search intensifies.

Their uneasy partnership leads them from Los Angeles to San Diego and eventually San Francisco, with Van Dorn and Niki slowly bridging their ideological divide. Niki, accustomed to being objectified, finds unexpected respect in Van Dorn's company, while he confides in her about his failed marriage and emotional detachment as a father. Their discussions reveal stark contrasts in their views on religion and sexuality, yet mutual dependence grows.

In San Francisco, Niki connects Van Dorn to Tod, a dealer linked to Ratan, a sadistic sadomasochistic pornographer rumored to produce snuff films. In a dimly lit sex shop, Van Dorn endures a screening of Ratan's latest film—a gruesome murder of a Mexican sex worker in Tijuana—traumatized, yet relieved to see the victim isn't Kristen.

Pressure mounts as Van Dorn demands Tod's address from Niki, who fears abandonment once Kristen is found. A heated confrontation culminates in Van Dorn striking her, forcing her compliance. Tracking Tod to a bondage dungeon, Van Dorn brutalizes him into revealing Ratan's hideout: a nightclub hosting live sex shows. There, Van Dorn discovers Ratan and Kristen in the small audience watching two performers on stage.

A brawl erupts as Van Dorn confronts Ratan, who slashes him with a knife before escaping from the nightclub into the street. Mast, who has yet to enter the club, attempts to apprehend Ratan. After struggling to draw his weapon, Mast shoots Ratan who dies in the entrance of a porn theater. While onlookers watch in horror as the police arrive. In the aftermath, Van Dorn finds Kristen cowering in the club's basement. To his devastation, she reveals in anger she fled voluntarily, rejecting his stifling upbringing for a world where she felt seen. Tearfully, Van Dorn admits his emotional failings, rooted in his austere faith, and pleads for reconciliation. Reluctantly, Kristen agrees to return home.

As they depart, Van Dorn spots Niki in the crowd. He attempts a hollow gesture of gratitude, but both understand their bond is severed. Niki disappears into the shadows, resigned to her bleak reality, while Van Dorn and Kristen retreat to Grand Rapids—their futures uncertain, their wounds far deeper than flesh.

== Cast ==
- George C. Scott as Jake Van Dorn
- Peter Boyle as Andy Mast
- Season Hubley as Niki
- Dick Sargent as Wes DeJong
- Leonard Gaines as Bill Ramada
- Dave Nichols as Kurt
- Gary Graham as Tod
- Larry Block as Detective Burrows
- Marc Alaimo as Ratan
- Leslie Ackerman as Felice
- Charlotte McGinnis as Beatrice (credited as Charlotte McGinnes)
- Ilah Davis as Kristen Van Dorn
- Paul Marin as Joe Van Dorn
- Bobby Kosser as Film Director
- Will Walker as Jim "Jism Jim" Sloan
- Hal Williams as "Big Dick Blaque"
- James Helder as John Van Dorn
- Reb Brown as Manager / Bouncer
- Tracey Walter as Adult Bookstore Clerk
- Ed Begley Jr. as Soldier
- W. K. Stratton as Porn Actor (uncredited)

== Production ==
=== Development ===
Paul Schrader partly based the screenplay for Hardcore on his own experience growing up in the Calvinist church in Grand Rapids, Michigan, where he studied theology at Calvin College. Having recently written the screenplay for Martin Scorsese's Taxi Driver (1976), Schrader began preparing Hardcore alongside executive producer John Milius at Warner Bros. and was scheduled to direct. After a shift in the studio's management, Schrader was paid $575,000 to terminate his contract to direct the film, after which Warren Beatty was attached as both the star and producer. However, in August 1976, Beatty withdrew from the project and it reverted to Schrader with the deal to terminate his contract cancelled. In April 1977, Schrader signed a multi-picutre deal with Columbia Pictures, with Hardcore the first film to be made under the deal with Schrader directing and Milius producing.

Milius later commented on the project, stating it was "a wonderful script that turned out to be a lousy movie. I blame Paul's direction for that." In the original version of the screenplay, the film ended with Jake never locating his daughter, and later learning of her death in a car accident.

=== Casting ===
Beatty clashed with Schrader in the pre-production stages of the film, resulting in Beatty leaving the project in August 1976. Beatty had wanted Schrader to reshape the script so that his character was searching for his missing girlfriend rather than his daughter, as Beatty felt he was too young at the time to portray the father of a teenager. According to director Schrader, "He wouldn't take me as a director... No good. I held out. I turned down a very large sum of money. I went after [George C.] Scott and I got him. One of the greatest actors in the world."

Schrader originally cast Diana Scarwid in the role of Niki, but the studio rejected her for the role, deeming her not attractive enough, after which Season Hubley was cast. Real-life adult film actress Marilyn Chambers also auditioned for the role, but was turned down by a casting director who thought she did not fit the image of a porn star. Years later, Chambers said "The Hardcore people wanted a woman with orange hair who chews gum, swings a big purse, and wears stiletto heels. That's such a cliche."

Ilah Davis, a first-time actress, was cast as Kristen Van Dorn, as Schrader felt "she was not conventionally beautiful, and was the sort of person who could be lured by flattery," mirroring her character's story. Hardcore was her first role in a motion picture. At the time, she was working as an exotic dancer in New York City while a member of the Yippies, and later joined the Rainbow Family under the married name 'Ilah Rogers'.

=== Filming ===
Principal photography of Hardcore began on February 6, 1978, largely in Los Angeles, San Francisco, and San Diego, with additional photography occurring in Schrader's hometown of Grand Rapids, Michigan, where part of the film is set. Schrader featured his own childhood church and a factory where he was employed as filming locations, and also cast his parents in uncredited bit parts. By Schrader's account, the shoot in Grand Rapids was unpleasant, as locals expressed disapproval for the film and its depiction of the community as highly provincial and socially antiquated.

By Schrader's account, Scott was in low spirits while shooting the film, which Schrader attributed to his recent commercial failures directing Rage (1972) and The Savage Is Loose (1974). "George, at this time, was not a terribly happy man," said Schrader. In his contract, Scott stipulated that the production include five break days for the actor due to his drinking problem at the time. Scott and Schrader often clashed on set, with Scott once proclaiming that, while a great writer, Schrader was a terrible director and that the film "was a piece of shit."

== Release ==
=== Critical response ===
Despite arguing that the climax lapses into action film cliches, Roger Ebert nonetheless gave the movie a four-out-of-four-star review for its "moments of pure revelation", particularly in the scenes between Scott and Hubley. Gene Siskel gave the film three-and-a-half stars out of four and called it "both a rich film of ideas and of strikingly real characters". He thought George C. Scott gave "one of his finest performances" in the film. Variety called it "a very good film" and predicted that no matter what each individual audience member's attitudes toward pornography and religion were, "nobody's going to be bored". Vincent Canby of The New York Times wrote in a mixed review that Schrader "demonstrates an extraordinary sensitivity to the realities of the American heritage that are seldom even thought about on screen, much less dramatized. His characters are complex. Unfortunately the melodrama seldom matches their complexity. It is blunt, clumsy—melodrama that seems not to reflect life but the ways lives are led in the movies."

Pauline Kael of The New Yorker was negative, explaining that Taxi Driver worked because "the protagonist, Travis Bickle, had a fear and hatred of sex so feverishly sensual that we experienced his tensions, his explosiveness. But in Hardcore, Jake feels no lust, so there's no enticement—and no contest. The Dutch Reformation Church has won the battle for his soul before the film's first frame." She added, "there something a little batty about the way Jake strides through hell swinging his fists, like a Calvinist John Wayne." Charles Champlin of the Los Angeles Times called the film "strong but finally disappointing stuff", explaining, "Quite apart from the plot concoctions that leave reality so far behind, the exasperation of Hardcore is that the confrontation has never quite come off. The daughter, whose feelings are presumably crucial to an understanding of the story, is never more than a cipher and a symbol." Gary Arnold of The Washington Post called it "absorbing but unsatisfying", finding that the reconciliation at the end "violates too much of what we've been led to believe".

The film was condemned by the United States Catholic Conference for its profanity, nudity, and depiction of Christianity.

Outside of the United States, Alexander Walker of the London Evening Standard stated that "the film is flawed in parts. Scott's foray into blue filmmaking, interviewing male studs and bits of female jailbait, is awkwardly inserted. But Hardcore remains a movie that arouses thought, never mind anything else, by confronting what many will find the unacceptable face of current cinema." John Lapsley of The Sun-Herald in Sydney gave it four stars, but noted that "it is a tour that is so thorough that it becomes documentary, and the plot loses steam for a section mid-film." Meaghan Morris of The Sydney Morning Herald, however, gave it a mostly negative review, praising Scott's performance but saying that "once the situation is set up in [the] absolute terms [of the plot], there is no way out except indulgence in guilt and misery about how insoluble it is. The unpleasant result is that instead of exploiting sex, Hardcore wallows in moral masochism."

On Rotten Tomatoes, the film has an approval rating of 80% based on 30 reviews, with an average rating of 6.9/10. The site's consensus states: "Director Paul Schrader's preoccupations with alienation and faith are given a compelling avatar in George C. Scott's superb performance, although some audiences may find Hardcore too soft to live up to its provocative promise." Metacritic, which uses a weighted average, assigned the film a score of 63 out of 100, based on 9 critics, indicating "generally favorable" reviews.

=== Accolades ===
Award	Date	Category	Recipient(s)	Result	Ref.
Berlin International Film Festival	1979	Golden Bear	Hardcore	Nominated	
Stinkers Bad Movie Awards	1979	Worst Film	Hardcore	Nominated	
Stinkers Bad Movie Awards	1979	Worst Performance by an Actor in a Leading Role	George C. Scott	Nominated	
Stinkers Bad Movie Awards	1979	Worst Performance by an Actress in a Supporting Role	Ilah Davis	Nominated	

=== Home media ===
Hardcore was available on VHS during the 1980s from Columbia Pictures Home Entertainment and later RCA/Columbia Pictures Home Video. In the 1990s, it was reissued on Columbia TriStar Home Video. In 2004, the film received a DVD release from Sony Pictures Home Entertainment.

In August 2016, the film received a U.S. release on Blu-ray from Twilight Time in a limited edition of 3,000 copies. The disc has a commentary track from Schrader and critics Eddy Friedfeld, Lee Pfeiffer, and Paul Scrabo. Jack Nitzsche's soundtrack for Hardcore has never been officially released, but Twilight Time's Blu-ray re-issue features an isolated score audio track. The British distributor Indicator Films released a limited edition region-free Blu-ray and DVD combination set in 2017, which was followed by a standard Blu-ray-only release in 2018. In June 2023, Kino Lorber announced a forthcoming special edition Blu-ray scheduled for release on August 22, 2023.

The film has also been available for streaming and digital download through Amazon.com, Apple's iTunes Store, Vudu, and other online media.
