= Paradise Beach =

- Series one opening (1993).
- Genre: Soap opera Drama
- Created by: Rick Maier; Wayne Doyle; Bevan Lee
- Directed by: Stephen Mann; Brian McDuffie; Sean Nash; Viktors Ritelis; Leigh Spence; Graham Thorburn
- Opening theme: "Under The Sun" by Russell Morris
- Country of origin: Australia
- Original language: English
- No. of series: 2
- No. of episodes: 260

Production
- Executive producers: Graham Burke; Greg Coote; Nick McMahon; Kris Noble
- Running time: 60 minutes
- Production companies: Village Roadshow Pictures; Genesis Entertainment

Original release
- Network: Nine Network
- Release: 31 May 1993 – 8 July 1994

Paradise Beach is an Australian television series created by Rick Maier, Wayne Doyle and Bevan Lee and made by Village Roadshow Pictures. It was made in association with America's Genesis Entertainment which later merged with New World Television for the Nine Network, and aired between 1993 and 1994. The series was created by Wayne Doyle and is set around characters living and working on Queensland's Gold Coast and was filmed largely on location, offering views of crashing waves, golden beaches and scantily clad young women and men. Paradise Beach was intended not only as a rival to Australian soaps Neighbours and Home and Away, but also to be the first breakthrough Australian soap to air in the American market.

== History ==
=== Production ===
Veteran Australian producer Jock Blair was the driving force behind Paradise Beach, with Nick McMahon as Executive Producer, and the first episodes of the soap were aimed at the American audience. Australian actress Tiffany Lamb used an American accent in her role as Lisa Whitman, and her opening storyline revolved around her childhood sweetheart Cooper Hart (played by Olivia Newton-John's then-husband Matt Lattanzi). Also appearing from the start were Robert Coleby (Chopper Squad, The Young Doctors) as Tom Barsby, and another familiar face was Andrew McKaige (Sons and Daughters, Prisoner) as Tom's younger brother Nick.

The rest of the original cast consisted of unknown actors all in their first acting roles. These included Ingo Rademacher, now famous for his separate roles in American series Titans and General Hospital. Here, he played Sean Hayden. His on-screen sister Tori, was played by Megan Connolly. The actress died on 6 September 2001 of a drug overdose, following short stints in Breakers and Home and Away. Finally, Raelee Hill was cast as scheming Loretta Taylor, Jaason Simmons was cast as bronzed lifeguard Harry Tait, Manu Bennett (credited as Jon Bennett) was cast as Kirk Barsby, son of Tom and his sister Cassie was played by Kimberley Joseph.

=== Retooling ===
When Paradise Beach was taken off the air in America, all traces of Americanism were removed and the producers concentrated on making the series work in its homeland and Europe. Matt Lattanzi departed, but not before Olivia Newton-John made a brief cameo, beaming down from the entrance of an aeroplane. Further additions to the cast included more experienced actors from other soaps including Melissa Bell from Neighbours as Emily Harris, and former-E Street regular Melissa Tkautz arrived as Vanessa Campbell. However, after two seasons, Nine Network eventually cancelled Paradise Beach after just 260 episodes.

After the series ended, Jaason Simmons joined the cast of Baywatch the following year. Kimberley Joseph featured in a recurring role in the cult-TV hit Lost as air hostess Cindy Chandler.

=== Reception ===
The series was largely savaged by the critics. With negative comparisons to the American shows Baywatch and Beverly Hills, 90210, the soap failed to make an impression in America in the Spring and Summer of 1993, as somewhat of a replacement for the similar style show Swans Crossing. In the UK, the soap was launched in a blaze of publicity on Sky Television in late October 1993 in the 6.30pm time slot with a 12.30pm repeat the following afternoon. Sky moved the more popular, but recently axed Australian soap opera, E Street to a weekend slot, but when Paradise Beach flopped in Britain as well as Australia, Sky moved E Street back to weekdays and Paradise Beach was screened at 6pm and mid day, creating an 'Aussie Soap Hour' for a few months until August 1994. Grampian Television broadcast the full series, every Monday to Wednesday at 17.10 slot from September 1995 and until July 1997. Many other countries around the world did broadcast the series. The show has never been released on VHS or DVD or digitally.

== Parody ==
Paradise Beach was parodied extensively on the ABC's Late Show, where it was mocked for its poor acting, formulaic plots and characterizations, characters dancing every time rock-and-roll music was played, and that it was effectively an infomercial for the various properties of Village Roadshow and Warner Bros. Movie World, which the skit characters would point out in a fourth wall break mentioning its shooting location.

== Cast ==
=== Original cast members ===
- Robert Coleby as Tom Barsby, local business tyrant
- Matt Lattanzi as Cooper Hart, American photographer (credited as 'special guest star')
- Jon Bennett as Kirk Barsby, Tom's son, ironman
- Megan Connolly as Tori Hayden, Sean's sister
- Deborah Coulls as Anna Ritchie, runs Anna's Beach Café
- Anthony Hayes as William 'Grommet' Ritchie, Anna's son
- Raelee Hill as Loretta Taylor, Cassie's best friend
- John Holding as Roy McDermott, Sean's best friend
- Kimberley Joseph as Cassie Barsby, Tom's daughter
- Tiffany Lamb as Lisa Whitman Barsby, Cooper's long lost love
- Andrew McKaige as Nick Barsby, Tom's brother who runs a surf shop
- Ingo Rademacher as Sean Hayden

=== Later additions ===
- Michael Caton as Ken Hayden, Sean and Tori's father
- Paula Duncan as Joan Hayden, Sean and Tori's mother
- Isla Fisher as Robyn Devereaux, Tom's secret daughter
- Gabrielle Fitzpatrick as Brooke Bannister

=== Guest actors ===
- Andrew McFarlane as Gordon
- Doug Penty as Patrick Worthing
- Emma Skinner as Alex Harding
- Eric Oldfield as Craig Ritchie
- Gerry Sont as Peter
- Jaason Simmons as Harry Tait
- Liz Burch as Fiona McDermott
- Lochie Daddo as Angel Bannister
- Mark Mitchell as Shirley Barnett
- Melissa Bell as Emily Harris
- Melissa Tkautz as Vanessa Campbell, Sean's ex-girlfriend
- Rebekah Elmaloglou as Karen Wolfe
- Richard Huggett as Sam Dexter
- Scott Michaelson as Chris Quinn
- Shane Ammann as Andrew
- Tayler Kane as David Finn
- Theresa Wong as Pam So Oy, Kirk's Chinese girlfriend
- Zoe Bertram as Paula Taylor
