= Darlings of the Gods =

- Based on: Darlings of the Gods by Garry O'Connor
- Written by: Roger Simpson; Graeme Farmer
- Directed by: Catherine Millar
- Starring: Anthony Higgins; Mel Martin; Jerome Ehlers
- Countries of origin: Australia; United Kingdom
- Original language: English
- No. of episodes: 2 x 2 hours

Production
- Producer: Roger Le Mesurier
- Running time: 120 min (2 episodes)
- Production companies: Australian Broadcasting Corporation; Film Victoria; Simpson Le Mesurier Films; Thames Television

Original release
- Network: ABC
- Release: 27 September 1989

Darlings of the Gods is a 1989 Australian mini series about the 1948 trip to Australia by Laurence Olivier and Vivien Leigh and the Old Vic Company, where Olivier and Leigh met Peter Finch.

== Cast ==
- Anthony Higgins as Laurence Olivier
- Mel Martin as Vivien Leigh
- Jerome Ehlers as Peter Finch
- Rhys McConnochie as Ralph Richardson
- Anthony Hawkins as Cecil Tennant
- Barry Quin as Dan Cunningham
- Jackie Kelleher as Elsie Beyer
- Lindy Davies as Antonia Vaughan
- Nicki Paull as June Kelly
- Shane Briant as Cecil Beaton
- Jon Finlayson as Tyrone Guthrie
- Kevin Miles as Lord Esher
- Jacek Koman as Company Member

== Home media ==
It is not currently available on DVD.
