= Farmkids =

2008 Australian kids TV series

- Promotional poster
- Genre: Children's television series Comedy
- Directed by: Sorin Oancea
- Voices of: Louise Brehmer; Liz Buchanan; Tiffany Lamb; Todd Levi; Danny Murphy; Andrew Buchanan; Bill McDonald; Bryan Probets; John Harmon; Warren Humphreys; Scott Strachan
- Opening theme: "FARMkids!"
- Composer: Cliff Bradley
- Countries of origin: Australia; France
- Original language: English
- No. of series: 2
- No. of episodes: 26

Production
- Executive producers: Ian Jones; Scott Strachan
- Producers: Jill Pattinson; Ian Jones; Andrew Gibson
- Running time: 12 minutes

Original release
- Release: 2008

Farmkids (styled as FARMkids) is an Australian-French animated children's comedy television series about pampered zoo animals accidentally being shipped to a dude ranch. Thirteen episodes were broadcast in Series 1 and another thirteen in Series 2, both of which aired in 2008.

== Premise ==
The series follows a group of animals who know nothing about living in the countryside. Having previously lived a pampered, star studded life in a popular nursery petting zoo, their lives take a unexpected turn when they are suddenly relocated.

== Voice cast ==
- Louise Brehmer as Bean, Poppit and Punky
- Liz Buchanan as Frizz and Splat
- Tiffany Lamb as MooLoo
- Todd Levi as Gilly
- Danny Murphy as Buster
- Andrew Buchanan as Doogie, Rodd and Russ
- Bill McDonald as Dumpster
- Bryan Probets as Drumstick
- John Harmon as Phill
- Warren Humphreys as Carlos
- Scott Strachan as Stretch

== Episodes ==
=== Series 1 (2008) ===
No. overall	No. in season	Title	Directed by	Written by	Original release date
1	1	"Fresh Country Air"	Sorin Oancea	Sorin Oancea & Jill Willis	2008
Dumpster's body odour is escalating out of control, except no-one has the heart to tell him. The FARMkids try to trick him into improving his personal hygiene. After a series of comical salon treatments, car washes and finally catapulting him into the ozone layer we discover it's his toxic cologne that is causing the nasty side effects.
2	2	"The K9 Factor"	Sorin Oancea	Robert Adams	2008
Doogie wants to be called "Wolverine", after his favourite comic book canine hero, but Dumpster thinks he would be a better canine hero than Doogie - the challenge is made. Who will win and will Doogie's ego be able to cope if he's beaten by his best buddy Dumpster?
3	3	"Face Off"	Sorin Oancea	Phil Lloyd	2008
The age old chestnut - "traditional versus modern" clash head on and Buster and Drumstick debate methods of farming. Buster orders some farm technology over the internet to "improve" their lifestyle and prove his point to Drumstick, only to find that the FARMkids come face to face with robotic versions of themselves. At first things seem better, until the robots' hidden agenda is revealed.
4	4	"Law and Disorder"	Sorin Oancea	Helen Wentland	2008
MooLoo's make-up bag has been stolen and Doogie and Buster are eager to play detective. Rod is brought to trial as the prime suspect and Splat as the witness. That is until Splat is cross-examined revealing a new twist to the case.
5	5	"The Giant Alien Tomato Attack"	Sorin Oancea	Stu Connolly & Sorin Oancea	2008
The FARMkids tune into the radio to hear that giant alien tomatoes are attacking Earth - chaos and panic breaks out. As the FARMkids hole up in the barn to protect themselves, panic turns to paranoia. Will sanity prevail and who will save them from the giant alien tomato attack?
6	6	"Small Gaseous Planet"	Sorin Oancea	Nick McGee & Sorin Oancea	2008
Always hungry Dumpster eats some of the radioactive ooze from a crashed NASA satellite. Much to the dismay of the FARMkids, this gives Dumpster gas of super bovine strength - but too much for him to handle. Poppit makes him a butt reactor to control himself which allows him to become a super hero... or so he thinks.
7	7	"MooLoo's Big Day"	Sorin Oancea	Jill Willis	2008
MooLoo wakes up on her birthday expecting everyone to think that today is as important to them as it is to her. Slowly she realises this just isn't so. Why are the FARMkids so unkind? Or are they?
8	8	"Bad TV"	Sorin Oancea	Robert Adams & Sorin Oancea	2008
Poppit finds an old TV at the rubbish tip which turns all the FARMkids into couch potato TV zombies. The FARMkids become addicted to television - what will they watch? Why has the remote got so much power? And more importantly whoever controls the remote control controls what's on television and everything else. The battle for the remote begins.
9	9	"Bean and Gone"	Sorin Oancea	Jill Willis	2008
Bean, the youngest FARMkid always seems to be in the way. One day Bean just disappears and wonders how long it will take everyone to notice? Will the other FARMkids really care? Will the FARMkids look at Bean differently after this adventure?
10	10	"Little Farm of Horrors"	Sorin Oancea	Stu Connolly & Sorin Oancea	2008
Poppit's entry into the Pumpkin Contest is ridiculed and rejected. She invents a machine to create her new winning pumpkin to show all the FARMkids. How big does the pumpkin grow and will it swallow up Dude Ranch?
11	11	"Splat is Back"	Sorin Oancea	Helen Wentland	2008
12	12	"The Old Rooster and the Sea"	Sorin Oancea	Helen Wentland	2008
13	13	"The Legend of One Eyed Jack"	Sorin Oancea	Phil Lloyd	2008

=== Series 2 (2008) ===
No. overall	No. in season	Title	Directed by	Written by	Original release date
14	1	"Who's Fooling Who?"	Sorin Oancea	Sorin Oancea	2008
15	2	"A Fuss Over Russ"	Sorin Oancea	Sorin Oancea	2008
16	3	"Blinded by the Light"	Sorin Oancea	Sorin Oancea	2008
17	4	"The Long Road to China"	Sorin Oancea	Sorin Oancea	2008
18	5	"Mobile Madness"	Sorin Oancea	Sorin Oancea	2008
19	6	"Dude Ranch Boot Camp"	Sorin Oancea	Sorin Oancea	2008
20	7	"The Biz"	Sorin Oancea	Steve Pratt (2)	2008
21	8	"PapaRatzi"	Sorin Oancea	Sorin Oancea	2008
22	9	"Barn 54"	Sorin Oancea	Sorin Oancea	2008
23	10	"Beautiful Wild Thing"	Sorin Oancea	Sorin Oancea	2008
24	11	"The Unlucky Charm"	Sorin Oancea	Sorin Oancea	2008
25	12	"Festival and Festivities"	Sorin Oancea	Sorin Oancea	2008
26	13	"The Classroom"	Sorin Oancea	Sorin Oancea	2008

== DVD release ==
In 2008, 3 DVDs were released entitled Chaos in the Country, Dude Ranch Boot Camp, and Hair, Wool, Feathers, and Fur.

== Awards and nominations ==
As of November 2008, Farmkids and finalists in the Atom Awards for Best Children's Television Series.
