= She Lives! =

- Genre: Drama
- Written by: Elizabeth Gill; Paul Neimark
- Directed by: Stuart Hagmann
- Starring: Desi Arnaz Jr. Season Hubley
- Country of origin: United States
- Original language: English

Production
- Executive producer: Lawrence Turman
- Producer: Stan Margulies
- Production location: Los Angeles
- Cinematography: Ronald W. Browne
- Editor: Rita Roland
- Running time: 74 min.
- Production company: ABC Circle Films

Original release
- Network: ABC
- Release: September 12, 1973

She Lives! is a 1973 made-for-television movie about a young couple, Andy and Pam (played by Desi Arnaz Jr. and Season Hubley).

She Lives! is the title of a novel by Paul G. Neimark, published in 1972, on which the television drama is based.

Some of the locations that were used for shooting included the steps and the exterior of the Architecture Building at UCLA, and the Bridge over the Avenue of the Stars in Century City. The final scene when Andy shouts out in the streets "She Lives!" was filmed in San Francisco at the corner of Divisadero St. and Vallejo St.

== Plot ==
Andy is unsatisfied in a class which involved the dissection of a rat, after its death, that he wanted to find a new person through an ad. Andy and Pam meet after Andy places a singles ad in his college newspaper. Pam sees his ad and sends Andy a letter. In that letter she advises him to put a response to her letter in the album Tommy by The Who at a local record store. He does and they meet. They are instantly attracted to each other and in the next scene they are living together. Andy has to overcome the objections of his father and brother (his mother having died a year earlier) and he and Pam get jobs and live in her studio apartment.

They are happy until Andy discovers a lump in Pam's neck. They go for tests and find out Pam has Hodgkin's Disease. They are devastated and Pam goes to a therapist to help cope with the sad news. Pam considers suicide, but Andy talks her out of it by convincing her that they will fight. They find a doctor who gives Pam experimental treatments that almost kill her. They travel to San Francisco to meet with another doctor. At first, he won't take Pam's case but eventually he is swayed by Andy's tearful appeal. He turns out to be the doctor who gets Pam's disease into remission.

As the young lovers run throughout the streets of San Francisco celebrating the news they come upon a group of girls playing hopscotch. Andy borrows the chalk from one of them and the girl tells him, "Okay, but don't break it." He responds, "I will never break anything as long as I live." He writes She Lives! in chalk and runs through the streets shouting it. He turns and there is Pam, the girl he loves. As the movie ends, Jim Croce's "Time in a Bottle" plays over the credits.

== Cast ==
- Desi Arnaz Jr. as Andy Reed
- Season Hubley as Pam Rainey
- Anthony Zerbe as Dr. Wellman
- Michael Margotta as Al Reed
- Jack Soo as Dr. Osikawa
- Jay Robinson as Dr. Mayhill
- Jennifer Kulik as Sue Stern
- Clay Tanner as Policeman

== Reception ==
Reviews were mixed.
