= Payton Haas =

American actor (born 1979)

- Born: June 9, 1979 (age 45); Jacksonville, Florida, US
- Occupation: Actor
- Spouse: Lauren Blumberg Haas

Payton Haas (born June 9, 1979) is an American actor who is most known for starring as Mike Blondel in the first season of Flipper, alongside Jessica Alba, Brian Wimmer, and Colleen Flynn.

Haas is a 2004 graduate in Computer and Information Sciences from the University of Florida.

== Career ==
In 1995, he played Mike Blondel in the television series Flipper.

In 1996, he played Jeremy in the television seriesThe Mystery Files of Shelby Woo.
