= The Last Man on Planet Earth =

1999 American television film

- VHS cover
- Written by: Kenneth Biller
- Directed by: Les Landau
- Starring: Julie Bowen; Paul Francis; Tamlyn Tomita; L. Scott Caldwell; Cliff DeYoung
- Music by: Mark Boccaccio
- Country of origin: United States
- Original language: English

Production
- Executive producer: Kenneth Biller
- Producers: Scott McAboy; Gilbert Alexander Wadsworth III
- Cinematography: Jacques Haitkin
- Editor: Sean Albertson
- Running time: 89 minutes
- Production companies: Sterling Pacific Films; Paramount Television

Original release
- Network: UPN
- Release: February 18, 1999

The Last Man on Planet Earth is a 1999 American television film directed by Les Landau and starring Julie Bowen, Paul Francis, Tamlyn Tomita, L. Scott Caldwell, and Cliff DeYoung. The plot concerns a female-dominated society following the death of the majority of the world's men. The film premiered on UPN on February 18, 1999.

== Plot ==
Sometime in a dystopian future, World War III with a war in Afghanistan breaks out. An incurable biological weapon called the "Y-bomb", which targets the male Y-chromosome, is used and results in the eventual deaths of 97% of the world's men. Feeling that they are better off without men, the planet's women decide to outlaw men because they were too violent. As a result, cloning has become the principal meaning of reproduction, with lesbianism becoming the state ideal.

Years later, scientist Hope Chayse, fearing for the future of the species, conducts a cloning experiment to produce a new male, Adam, genetically enhanced to mature from baby to adult in weeks and to refrain from violence. When Adam reaches maturity, he soon finds himself on the run from the FBI, and hiding out with small rebel bands of the last surviving men on Earth.

=== End ===
The house Adam and Hope are hiding in is burnt to the ground. Kara gives Hope her car and tells her to run away. She makes up a story about the bodies in the house being Hope and Adam's, while Doe escaped in her car. Three months later, Esther visits Hope, now working as a waitress in Virginia. Esther tells her that the test was positive—-Hope is pregnant with a son, since she and Adam had sex the night before he died.

== Main characters ==
- Hope Chayse (Julie Bowen) - A CTU graduate student in Genetic Engineering who invented Adam, initially hoping to satisfy her heterosexual desire. She used genetic engineering, eliminating the genes connected to violence and aggression. Her product, Adam, is a "new type of man" that has no tendency of violence.
- Adam (Paul Francis) - A man created by genetic engineering who reaches full maturity in 33 days and stops aging. He escapes from Hope to explore "the city" by himself only to find out that he is in a world that abhors men. He meets a teenage girl, who takes him to her sister Lilah, a cross-dressed pimp. Lilah tricks him by taking him to Mother May, owner of a high class brothel where she employs a number of older surviving men.
- Agent Kara Hastings (Tamlyn Tomita) - An FBI agent who is determined to capture Adam and restore a violence- and man-free society. She is under the supervision of Director Elizabeth Riggs played by (Veronica Cartwright), who is running for President. Once, during a raid of Mother May's brothel, Hastings finds Riggs is a customer there. She is persuaded to make a deal with Hope to bring Adam back safe, so he can be presented at a scientific conference.
- Esther (L. Scott Caldwell) - Hope's professor, who opposes the idea of engineering a man. She eventually helps Hope to cure Adam of the Y-chromosome plague, injected into him by Riggs.
- John Doe (Cliff De Young) - Leader of the Reclaimers, a small group of old men living in a deserted football field who hope to reclaim the government one day. He blames women for the Y-bomb, made to annihilate men. Doe holds Adam hostage in exchange for women (inmates from the Federal Prison), hoping that they will let his men reproduce. However, when Hope, Kara and Esther try to use Doe's blood to cure Adam (due to his immunity), Doe takes Hope hostage and tries to rape her. Adam, although sick, picks up a gun and points it at him. Doe claims Adam isn't "man enough" to shoot, but he does so since he can't let anyone hurt Hope.

== Reception ==
- The Last Man on Planet Earth was parodied in "Operation: F.U.T.U.R.E.", an episode of Codename: Kids Next Door.

== See also ==
- List of television films produced for UPN
