= Michael Pattinson =

Australian film director

- Born: 1957 (age 68–69); Melbourne, Australia
- Occupation: Film director
- Years active: 1980–present

Michael Pattinson (born 1957) is an Australian film director. He has directed over 40 films and television shows since 1980. In 1987, along with Bruce Myles, he co-directed the film Ground Zero. It was entered into the 38th Berlin International Film Festival.

== Selected filmography ==
- The Young Doctors (1980)
- Prisoner (1980)
- Moving Out (1983)
- Street Hero (1984)
- Ground Zero (1987)
- Wendy Cracked a Walnut (1990)
- The Last Bullet (1995)
- The Limbic Region (1996)
- Virtual Nightmare (2000)
