= Evil Breed: The Legend of Samhain =

- Movie poster for the film
- Directed by: Christian Viel
- Written by: Christian Viel; William R. Mariani
- Produced by: Carmelo Caruana; Dawne Everett; William R. Mariani
- Starring: Bobbie Phillips; Howard Rosenstein; Ginger Lynn Allen; Chasey Lain; Taylor Hayes; Jenna Jameson; Richard Grieco; Brandi-Ann Milbradt
- Release date: March 1, 2003
- Country: Canada

Samhain, or Evil Breed: The Legend of Samhain, is a 2003 Canadian horror film, starring Bobbie Phillips, Richard Grieco, and pornographic actors Ginger Lynn Allen, Chasey Lain, Taylor Hayes, and Jenna Jameson.

The plot concerns a group of American students camping in Ireland, and studying the legends of the Druids, who are attacked by deformed mutant cannibals from the backwoods.

The film was originally produced in 2002–2003, in a longer version with more blood humor and nudity, titled simply Samhain, but languished until 2005–2006, when it was shortened, retitled Evil Breed: The Legend of Samhain, and released on DVD by Lions Gate Entertainment. It has also played on cable television on the Showtime network.

== Cast ==
- Bobbie Phillips as Karen Douglas
- HoJo Rose as Paul (credited as Howard Rosenstein)
- Ginger Lynn as Pandora (credited as Ginger Lynn Allen)
- Chasey Lain as Amy
- Taylor Hayes as The Breeder
- Jenna Jameson as Jenny
- Richard Grieco as Mark
- Brandon Milbrant as Shae (credited as Brandi-Ann Milbrant)
- Lael Stellick as The Shape

== See also ==
- List of films set around Halloween
