= Bobbie Phillips =

American actress

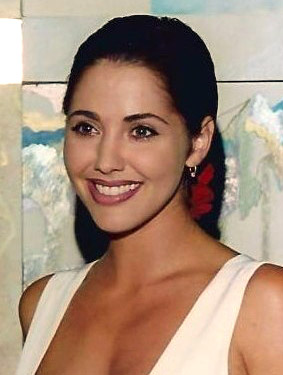
- Phillips in 2011
- Born: January 29, 1968 (age 58); Charleston, South Carolina, U.S.
- Occupation: Actress
- Years active: 1990–2004, 2014–2019
- Spouse: Anthony Filipetto (m. 2000)
- Children: 1

Bobbie Phillips (born January 29, 1968) is an American actress.

== Career ==
Born in Charleston, South Carolina, Phillips moved to Hollywood in 1990 and began working in television soon after. Her first acting job was guest-starring with Halle Berry on the science-fiction Fox comedy They Came from Outer Space. Phillips was also a sought-after fitness and swimsuit model. Canadian bodybuilder and entrepreneur Joe Weider placed her under contract.

She landed her first regular television series for Paramount Pictures alongside Sir Mix-a-Lot in The Watcher. Phillips continued to land roles in television and independent films from comedies to martial arts films; Phillips is a trained martial artist and performed most of her fighting and stunts in these films. On the television series The Crow: Stairway to Heaven (1998), Phillips played the dual role of Talon/Hannah Foster. Phillips was the first female to play the character of The Crow on screen. In between The Crow: Stairway to Heaven filming, Phillips also showed off her martial arts abilities in a series of tele-films for Paramount Pictures.

Paramount Pictures offered Phillips a studio contract after high ratings for Chameleon. It was followed by two sequels: Chameleon II: Death Match and Chameleon 3: Dark Angel.

Phillips appeared on numerous popular television shows such as The Hitchhiker, Stargate SG-1, The X-Files (Winner: Best Guest Actress in a Genre TV Series), Married... with Children, Two Guys and a Girl and Baywatch.

Phillips won a 22nd People's Choice Awards for "Favorite New TV Dramatic Series" for Murder One. Phillips received praise from Variety for her role as Julie Costello.

She had a small role in the film Showgirls. She has also starred in several small independent films and has appeared on stage as well. Prior to acting professionally, Phillips starred in several musicals. She performed as a child at the Dock Street Theater in her hometown of Charleston, South Carolina. Phillips and Thomas Gibson later worked together, acting in the television series Dharma & Greg.

Phillips continued to perform in television sitcoms, dramas, and independent feature films up until her early retirement in 2003. Phillips' last film prior to retiring was Last Flight Out, in which she starred as a missionary doctor. Phillips returned to acting in 2014 with several independent feature films released in 2015 and 2016.

== Personal life ==
Phillips is married to Anthony Filipetto, who was her hairstylist on several films and television shows, after meeting on the set of the film Hustle in 1999. Phillips retired and left Hollywood in 2003. Bobbie and her husband travelled to Costa Rica to rescue animals and begin Anthony's surfing career. The couple travelled extensively between Canada, Fiji, Australia and Mexico before Bobbie moved to Anthony's home country of Canada. She appeared on the April 17, 2010 episode of the HGTV home design show Divine Design, where it was disclosed that she had recently moved to her husband Anthony's home country of Canada with their three dogs.

She has one son named Mark from her previous marriage.

Phillips is involved in animal rescue work around the world. Beginning in 2016, she expanded that role by becoming involved with several elephant rescue organizations. In the same year she visited Sri Lanka and learned about the inner workings of the organization Embark, whose main focus is street dogs in the island nation.

In November 2018, The New York Times published an article in which Phillips alleged that Les Moonves sexually assaulted her during the mid-1990s and was attempting to bury the allegations.

== Filmography ==
Film
Year	Title	Role	Notes
1993	Body of Influence	First Woman	Video
1993	TC 2000	Zoey Kinsella / TC 2000 X	
1994	Animal Instincts II	Waitress	Video
1994	Back in Action	Helen Lewinsky	
1994	Hail Caesar	Buffer Bidwell	
1995	Guns and Lipstick	Felicia	
1995	Lion Strike	Kelly	
1995	Showgirls	Dee	
1996	Cheyenne	Cheyenne	Bo Svenson, Gary Hudson, M.C. Hammer and Robert Bell co-stars
1998	Carnival of Souls	Alex Grant	
1999	American Virgin	Raquel	
2003	Weed Man	Unknown	
2003	Evil Breed: The Legend of Samhain	Karen Douglas	
2004	Last Flight Out	Dr. Anne Williams	
2014	Doomsday	Mable	Short
2015	Chasing Valentine	Beth	
2015	Save Yourself	Elizabeth	
2016	Renaissance	Dr. Babette Winter	
2016	The Apostle Peter: Redemption	Poppaea Sabina	
2019	The Gandhi Murder	Elizabeth	
2019	Beast Within	Melanie	

Television
Year	Title	Role	Notes
1991	They Came from Outer Space	Mrs. Morley	Episode: "Hair Today, Gone Tomorrow"
1991	Parker Lewis Can't Lose	Melinda	Episode: "Love Handles"
1991–1992	Married... with Children	Jill / Kara	"If Al Had a Hammer" "The Mystery of Skull Island"
1992	Matlock	Lisa Loomis	Episode: "The Big Payoff"
1992	Silk Stalkings	Tessa Shaver	Episode: "Goodtime Charlie"
1992	Dark Justice	Lucy	Episode: "A Better Mousetrap"
1992	Baywatch	Lifeguard	Episode: "War of Nerves"
1993	The Cover Girl Murders	Hetty Barnett	TV Movie
1994	Red Shoe Diaries	Luscious Lola	Episode: "Luscious Lola"
1994	Honor Thy Father and Mother: The True Story of the Menendez Murders	Jamie Pisarcik	TV Movie
1994	Fortune Hunter	Kelly Owen	Episode: "Stowaway"
1994	Baywatch	Kim	Episode: "Red Wind"
1994	The Bold and the Beautiful	Rhonda	1 episode
1995	Pointman	Brenner	Episode: "Models"
1995	The Watcher	Lori Danforth	8 episodes
1995–1996	Murder One	Julie Costello	15 episodes
1996	The X-Files	Dr. Bambi Berenbaum	Episode: "War of the Coprophages"
1996	Boy Meets World	Louanne	Episode: "I Never Sang for My Legal Guardian"
1996–1997	The Cape	Lieutenant Commander Barbara De Santos	17 episodes
1997	Stargate SG-1	Kynthia	Episode: "Brief Candle"
1998	House Rules	Dr. Chris Cavanaugh	Episode: "Riley's New Job"
1998	Chameleon	Kam	TV Movie
1998–2000	Two Guys and a Girl	Shawn	3 episodes, including "Another Moving Script"
1999	Chameleon II: Death Match	Kam	TV Movie
1999	The Magnificent Seven	Alice	Episode: "Wagon Train": Parts 1 and 2
1999	The Crow: Stairway to Heaven	Hannah Foster / Talon	2 episodes
1999	The Strip	Lilly Briscoe	Episode: "Winner Takes It All"
2000	The Hustle	Maya / Corinna	TV Movie
2000	Chameleon 3: Dark Angel	Kam	TV Movie
2001	Seven Days	Raven	Episode: "Raven"
2001	Dharma & Greg	Anna	Episode: "Dream a Little Dream of Her"
2014	The Good Sister	Mrs. Nelles	TV Movie
2017	Love Blossoms	Olivia Caine	TV Movie
