= E.A.R.T.H. Force =

- Genre: Action adventure
- Written by: Bill Dial
- Starring: Gil Gerard; Joanna Pacuła; Clayton Rohner; Robert Knepper; Stewart Finlay-McLennan; Tiffany Lamb
- Theme music composer: Bill Conti (pilot); Cory Lerios (series); John D'Andrea (series)
- Country of origin: United States
- Original language: English
- No. of seasons: 1
- No. of episodes: 6 (3 unaired)

Production
- Executive producers: Richard Chapman; Bill Dial
- Production locations: Queensland, Australia
- Running time: 45 minutes
- Production companies: Chapman/Dial; Paramount Network Television

Original release
- Network: CBS
- Release: September 16 – September 29, 1990

E.A.R.T.H. Force is an American action adventure television series starring Gil Gerard. The series aired 3 episodes on CBS from September 16 to September 29, 1990, before being canceled due to low ratings, as part of CBS' programming realignment that also involves the switch of The Flash, the delay of Sons and Daughters, and the hiatus of the sitcom Lenny. However all episodes (including the ones skipped by CBS) were aired by some non-English TV stations (e.g., TVP in Poland).

== Premise ==
The series is about an elite group, the Earth Alert Research Tactical Headquarters (E.A.R.T.H.), that was brought together by a dying millionaire to prevent environmental disasters around the world.

== Cast ==
- Gil Gerard as Dr. John Harding M.D.
- Joanna Pacuła as mission coordinator Diana Randall
- Clayton Rohner as nuclear physicist Dr. Carl Dana
- Tiffany Lamb as oceanographer Dr. Catherine Romano
- Robert Knepper as zoologist Dr. Peter Roland
- Stewart Finlay-McLennan as mercenary soldier Charles Dillon
- Robert Coleby as business magnate Frederick Winter
- Steve Bisley as Wooster
- Lewis Fitz-Gerald as Halloran

== Production ==
E.A.R.T.H. Force was filmed in Queensland, Australia. Working titles for the series include The Elite (the title under which it aired internationally) and The Green Machine. According to the show's producer Richard Chapman, he described the show as "an adventure show focusing on a group of environmental experts who unite to serve as local troubleshooters, combating environmental crime and dealing with natural disasters."

== Episodes ==
No.	Title	Directed by	Written by	Original release date
1	"E.A.R.T.H. Force"	Bill Corcoran	Richard Chapman & Bill Dial	September 16, 1990
2	"E.A.R.T.H. Force"	Bill Corcoran	Richard Chapman & Bill Dial	September 16, 1990
2-hour pilot: When sabotage at a nuclear power plant triggers an alert, industrialist Frederick Mayer assembles a team to combat the crisis.
3	"Not So Wild Kingdom"	Bill Corcoran	Richard Chapman & Bill Dial	September 22, 1990
Animals from a refuge/preserve are being sold.
4	"Not in My Back Yard"	Rod Hardy	Richard Chapman & Bill Dial	September 29, 1990
A widow whose son is dying of toxicity asks the team to a Kansas town that's possibly being poisoned by a big developer's landfill.
5	"Oil Spill Story"	TBA	TBA	TBA
6	"They Shoot Trees, Don't They?"	TBA	TBA	TBA
7	"Club Dead"	TBA	TBA	TBA

== Reception ==
Howard Rosenberg of the Los Angeles Times gave the "forgettable" series the "Big Greenback Award", "for foisting formulaic cretinous TV on viewers under the guise of environmentalist drama". Scott D. Pierce of the Deseret News called the show an "absolute stinker". "Bad writing. Bad acting. Bad directing. E.A.R.T.H. Force has it all." Ray Richmond of the Orange County Register said the series is "painfully banal" and that it "resemble a kind of socially conscious knockoff of The A-Team. The acting is stiff, the plot contrived". Richmond also speculated that CBS was never confident in the series to begin with since they only ordered six episodes, rather than the usual 13, and they scheduled the premiere against the 42nd Primetime Emmy Awards. CBS also scheduled the series on Saturday nights, a near certain death sentence. John Martin of The Providence Journal called the series "pretentious" while noting the obvious conflict between the message and its medium. Martin said "saving the environment can only be accomplished by changing the habits of consumption". "In television, encouraging consumption is Job One". "Don't look for a TV series to point the finger at its advertisers".
