= Rita Roland =

American film editor

- Born: Rita Victoria Rosenstein; October 5, 1914; Berlin, Germany
- Died: August 17, 1998 (aged 83); Los Angeles, California, USA
- Occupation: Film editor
- Spouse: Henry Martin

Rita Roland (born Rita Rosenstein) was a prolific German-born film editor known for her work on German and American films like Six Pack, The New Kids, and Good Luck, Miss Wyckoff.

== Biography ==
Rita Rosenstein was born in Germany to Ernst Rosenstein and Elsa Landsberger. She began her career as a film editor in her native country before World War II. She fled Germany during the Holocaust, moving to Hollywood, where she edited dozens of films for MGM before she died in 1998. She was survived by her husband, Dutch writer-director Henry Martin.

== Selected filmography ==
Editor
Year	Film	Director	Notes	Ref.
1938	I Want to Live with Letizia	Camillo Mastrocinque		
1939	Wilton's Zoo	Douglas Sirk		
1940	Somewhere in the Netherlands	Ludwig Berger		
1956	Crowded Paradise	Fred Pressburger		
1964	Honeymoon Hotel	Henry Levin		
1965	Girl Happy	Boris Sagal		
1965	A Patch of Blue	Guy Green	First collaboration with Guy Green	
1966	The Singing Nun	Henry Koster		
1966	Spinout	Norman Taurog		
1966	Penelope	Arthur Hiller		
1967	Don't Make Waves	Alexander Mackendrick		
1968	Where Were You When the Lights Went Out?	Hy Averback		
1968	The Split	Gordon Flemyng		
1969	More	Barbet Schroeder		
1969	Justine	George Cukor		
1970	Move	Stuart Rosenberg		
1972	To Find a Man	Buzz Kulik		
1975	Once Is Not Enough	Guy Green	Second collaboration with Guy Green	
1978	The Betsy	Daniel Petrie	First collaboration with Daniel Petrie	
1979	Good Luck, Miss Wyckoff	Marvin J. Chomsky		
1980	Resurrection	Daniel Petrie	Second collaboration with Daniel Petrie	
1981	Fort Apache, The Bronx	Daniel Petrie	Third collaboration with Daniel Petrie	
1982	Six Pack	Daniel Petrie	Fourth collaboration with Daniel Petrie	
1985	The New Kids	Sean S. Cunningham		

Editorial department
Year	Film	Director	Role	Notes	Ref.
1961	Ada	Daniel Mann	Assistant editor	Uncredited	

Documentaries

Editor
Year	Film	Director
1947	Walvis in zicht!	Hannes de Boer
1948	Dutch in Seven Lessons	Charles Huguenot van der Linden; Heinz Josephson

TV movies

Editor
Year	Film	Director
1972	The Weekend Nun	Jeannot Szwarc
1973	The Devil's Daughter	Jeannot Szwarc
1973	Incident on a Dark Street	Buzz Kulik
1973	She Lives!	Stuart Hagmann
1973	Pioneer Woman	Buzz Kulik
1974	Remember When	Buzz Kulik
1976	The Lindbergh Kidnapping Case	Buzz Kulik
1976	Sybil	Daniel Petrie
1977	Eleanor and Franklin: The White House Years	Daniel Petrie
1977	Corey: For the People	Buzz Kulik
1982	A Piano for Mrs. Cimino	George Schaefer
1984	The Dollmaker	Daniel Petrie

TV series

Editor
Year	Title	Notes
1965	A Man Called Shenandoah	1 episode
1973	Police Story	1 episode
1976	Sybil	2 episodes

Editorial department
Year	Title	Role	Notes
1953−54	Johnny Jupiter	Supervising editor	63 episodes
