= Chameleon II: Death Match =

Australian-American science fiction TV film (1999)

- Film Poster
- Genre: Science Fiction; Action
- Written by: Bennett Cohen
- Directed by: Craig R. Baxley; Russell King
- Starring: Bobbie Phillips; Casey Siemaszko; Tasha Smith; Kara Zediker; Jerome Ehlers; John Waters; Simon Westaway; Mark Lee; Nique Needles; Robert Coleby; Damian De Montemas
- Music by: Roger Neill
- Country of origin: United States/Australia
- Original language: English

Production
- Producer: Brian Burgess
- Production location: Gold Coast, Queensland
- Cinematography: David Connell
- Editor: Sonny Baskin
- Running time: 82 minutes
- Production companies: Village Roadshow Pictures; Wilshire Court Productions

Original release
- Network: UPN
- Release: October 15, 1999

Chameleon II: Death Match is a 1999 American-Australian science fiction action television movie, starring Bobbie Phillips. It was written by Bennett Cohen and directed by Craig R. Baxley and Russell King. The film is second installment of the Chameleon film series. It is a sequel to the 1998 film Chameleon and was followed by a second sequel, Chameleon 3: Dark Angel. Chameleon II was first aired on October 15, 1999 on UPN.

== Plot ==
Kam (Bobbie Phillips), a genetically altered agent, is called back to action when the clientele of a luxury casino is taken hostage by an audacious criminal.

== Cast ==
- Bobbie Phillips as Kam
- Casey Siemaszko as Jake Booker
- Tasha Smith as Webster, IBI Director
- Kara Zediker as Nicky Quade
- Jerome Ehlers as Erickson
- John Waters as Henry Kubica
- Simon Westaway as Reynard Lulac
- Mark Lee as Steven Myers
- Rhondda Findleton as Eva
- Nique Needles as Oscar
- Robert Coleby as Brandford
- Damian De Montemas as Lenz
- Josh Quong Tart as Connor
- Ben Lawson as Tyler Kubica
- Julian Garner as Dekker
- Scott McLean as Bennet, Nicky’s Partner
- Donald Battee as Hugh

== Reception ==
Robert Pardi from TV Guide gave the film two out of four stars and wrote: "Why doesn't someone cast B-movie icon Bobbie Phillips in a top-of-the-line movie? She's this Die Hard rip-off's most attractive selling point, and a fine advertisement for genetic reconfiguring". Jim McLennan from "Girls with Guns" compared it unfavorably to Die Hard and wrote: "Overall, this is a poor follow-up. You shouldn’t try to remake classics, unless you can bring something new to the party, and while Phillips is certainly no worse an actor than Bruce Willis, it’s not enough to stop this seeming a lame copy".

== Sequel ==
A sequel titled Chameleon 3: Dark Angel was released in 2000.

== See also ==
- List of television films produced for UPN
