= Chameleon 3: Dark Angel =

2000 science fiction TV film

- Film Poster
- Genre: Science Fiction; Action
- Written by: Bennett Cohen (Characters); Ronnie Christensen (Written by)
- Directed by: John Lafia
- Starring: Bobbie Phillips; Teal Redmann; Alex Kuzelicki; Doug Penty; Suzi Dougherty; Jonathan Stuart
- Music by: Joel Goldsmith
- Country of origin: United States/Australia
- Original language: English

Production
- Producer: Brian Burgess
- Production location: Queensland
- Cinematography: David Foreman
- Editor: Joel Goodman
- Running time: 87 minutes
- Production companies: Village Roadshow Pictures; Wilshire Court Productions

Original release
- Network: UPN
- Release: May 19, 2000

Chameleon 3: Dark Angel is a 2000 American-Australian television-science fiction film. It was directed by John Lafia and starred Bobbie Phillips as Kam. The film is a sequel to Chameleon and Chameleon II: Death Match. The film premiered on UPN on May 19, 2000.

== Plot ==
In the third and last film of the trilogy, Kam, a genetically engineered agent, attempts to thwart the plans of her evil twin brother.

== Cast ==
- Bobbie Phillips as Kam
- Teal Redmann as Dr. Tess Adkins
- Alex Kuzelicki as Kane
- Doug Penty as Ben Merrit, Kam's Handler for IBI
- Suzi Dougherty as Victoria, IBI Shrink
- Jonathan Stuart as Jeremy Callow, IBI Med Tech
- John Atkinson as Grim the Rottweiler Dealer

== Reception ==
Robert Pardi from TV Guide gave film five out of five stars: "Fans of the CHAMELEON franchise won't be disappointed by this second sequel, which chronicles the further adventures of a DNA-improved policewoman of the future who's part falcon, part chameleon, part coyote and all fox!".

== See also ==
- List of television films produced for UPN
