= Robert Coleby =

British actor (born 1947)

- Born: Robert Taylor; 1947 (age 78–79); Ipswich, Suffolk, England
- Occupation: Actor
- Spouse: Lena Coleby
- Children: Anja Coleby; Conrad Coleby

Robert Coleby (born 1947) is a British actor who has spent most of his career in Australia. Active since the 1970s, he has over 70 film and television credits to his name. Coleby has acted on stage in numerous productions for the Queensland Theatre Company in Brisbane.

== Early life ==
In his late teens, Robert lived in Edington, Somerset and went to Dr Morgan's School in Bridgwater. At that time he was influenced by the Beat Generation, novelist Jack Kerouac and singer/songwriter Bob Dylan and performed with acoustic guitar at folk music clubs in Bridgwater and Taunton. He enjoyed hitch-hiking in Europe during the school holidays, and worked in the peat fields near Shapwick to fund his travels.

== Early career ==
Coleby's real name is Robert Taylor. Since there was already a famous actor of that name, Equity rules required that he choose another.

Coleby's earliest screen role was in 1970, playing the role of Fortinbras in a TV version of Hamlet in the long-running US series Hallmark Hall of Fame, followed by a role as a hitchhiker in the 1971 US motion picture The Last Run which starred George C. Scott. During the next several years, he appeared in a number of TV productions in the UK, including five episodes of the 1973 children's series Pollyanna. Moving to Sydney, Australia in 1975, he made his debut on Australian TV appearing in an episode of the TV period drama Rush in 1976. Over the next two decades, Coleby became a regular face on Australian TV; he was a cast regular on several TV series including the roles; Dr Barrett in The Young Doctors in 1977; pilot Barry Drummond on Chopper Squad (1977–79); RAN officer Lt Fisher in Patrol Boat (1979–83); Reverend Lonsdale in the mini-series Anzacs (1985); and, businessman Tom Barsby in the short-lived soap opera, Paradise Beach (1993–94).

== Later career ==
Coleby played Richard Craig in several episodes of the Australian medical drama All Saints between 1998 and 2004, and appeared as William Maplewhite in two episodes of The Lost World in 2001 and 2002. In 2005 he portrayed Rock Hudson in the fictionalised American television movie/docudrama Dynasty: The Making of a Guilty Pleasure, based on the creation and behind the scenes production of the 1980s prime time soap opera Dynasty. Coleby played Alexander Preston in the 2006 American telenovela Monarch Cove, and Howard Webb in a 2006 episode of the Australian drama McLeod's Daughters. He later played Paul Devers in the 2007 American miniseries The Starter Wife.

In 2009 Coleby appeared as "Urquart" in two episodes of the British television series Heartbeat ("Thursday's Children" and "The Middle of Somewhere") both of which were set in Australia.

More recent theatre work includes the title role in the Queensland Theatre Company's 2007 production of the Henrik Ibsen play John Gabriel Borkman. In 2011, Coleby appeared in an episode of Terra Nova, titled "Proof", as Professor Ken Horton. He also appeared in WWE Studios The Marine 2, which was inspired by the 2001 Dos Palmas kidnappings.

== Personal life ==
Coleby is married to Lena Coleby; their children are Australian actors Anja Coleby and Conrad Coleby.

== Filmography ==
=== Film ===
Year	Title	Role	Notes
1970	Hallmark Hall of Fame: Hamlet	Fortinbras	TV movie
1971	A Lizard in a Woman's Skin	Harry Smith	Feature film
1971	The Last Run	Hitch Hiker	Feature film
1979	The Plumber	Brian Cowper	TV movie
1980	Coralie Landsdowne Says No	Paul	TV movie
1983	Now and Forever	Ian Clarke	Feature film
1985	The Adventures of Robin Hood	George Lonsdale (voice)	Animated TV movie
1985	Archer	Etienne	TV movie
1986	The Blue Lightning	Ninian	TV movie
1986	Ivanhoe	Robin Hood (voice)	Animated TV movie
1986	Hector's Bunyip	George Bailey	TV movie
1987	Great Expectations: The Untold Story	Roger	TV movie
1988	Prisoner of Zenda	Voice role	Animated film
1988	Sebastian and the Sparrow	Peter Thornbury	Feature film
1995	In Pursuit of Honor	James Shattuck	TV movie
1996	Little White Lies	Kuhl	TV movie
1996	The Phantom	Captain Phillip Horton	Feature film
1998	The Real Macaw	Mr. St. John	Feature film
1999	The Lost World	William Maple-White	TV movie
1999	Chameleon II: Death Match	Branford	TV movie
2001	Curse of the Talisman	Museum Curator	TV movie
2001	Walk the Talk	Pastor Bob	Feature film
2002	The Crocodile Hunter: Collision Course	Dr. Weinberger	Feature film
2003	Tempted	Lawyer	TV movie
2003	Mermaids	Director	TV movie
2005	Dynasty: The Making of a Guilty Pleasure	Rock Hudson	TV movie
2006	The Marine	Braun	Feature film
2009	The Marine 2	Darren Conner	Feature film
2010	Bad Behaviour	Clive	Feature film
2013	Tracks	Pop	Feature film
2013	Cough	George	Short film
2015	StalkHer	Dr. Jacob Weeks	Feature film
2017	Don't Tell	John Bowers	Feature film

=== Television ===
Year	Title	Role	Notes	Ref
1970	Saturday Night Theatre	Fortinbras	1 episode	
1971	Take Three Girls	Dennis	TV series, 1 episode	
1973	The Adventures of Black Beauty	Harry	TV series, 1 episode	
1973	New Scotland Yard	Geoff Grant	TV series, 1 episode	
1973	Pollyanna	Timothy	5 episodes	
1974	John Halifax	John Halifax	TV series, 5 episodes	
1974	The Protectors	Anton	TV series, 1 episode	
1974	Death or Glory Boy	Sergeant Potter	1 episode	
1974	Skiboy	Jean Noel	TV series, 6 episodes	
1974	King Lear	Edgar	6 episodes	
1975	Quiller	Hilberg	TV series, 1 episode	
1976	Rush	Andy Curran	TV series, 1 episode	
1976–77	The Young Doctors	Paul Barrett	TV series, 101 episodes	
1978	Case for the Defence	John	TV series, 1 episode	
1977–79	Chopper Squad	Barry Drummond	TV series, 27 episodes	
1980	Timelapse	Douglas Hardy	TV series	
1981	Punishment	Christopher Lang	TV series	
1981	Levkas Man	Paul Gerrard	TV miniseries, 6 episodes	
1981	Cop Shop	Harry Wilson	TV series, 2 episodes	
1981	Bellamy	Peter Kelso	TV series, 1 episode	
1981	Sporting Chance		1 episode	
1983	For the Term of His Natural Life	John Rex	TV miniseries, 3 episodes	
1979–83	Patrol Boat	Lieutenant Charles Fisher	TV series, 27 episodes	
1983	Carson's Law	Richard Kruger	TV series, 8 episodes	
1984	Five Mile Creek	Oliver Hamilton	TV series, 1 episode	
1984	Singles	Jack Howard	1 episode	
1985	Special Squad		TV series, 1 episode	
1985	Anzacs	Rev. George Lonsdale	TV miniseries, 5 episodes	
1984-85	A Country Practice	Paul / Tony	TV series, 4 episodes	
1986	The Fast Lane	Dwyer	TV series, 1 episode	
1987	Frontier	Major Nunn	3 episodes	
1987	Rafferty's Rules	David Andrews	TV series, 1 episode	
1988	Australians	Raymond Longford	TV series, 1 episode	
1989	This Man... This Woman	Neil Clarke	TV miniseries, 2 episodes	
1989	The Flying Doctors	Alex Potter	TV series, 1 episode	
1989	Mission Impossible	Grigor Caron	TV series, 1 episode	
1989	Inside Running		TV series, 6 episodes	
1990	E.A.R.T.H. Force	Frederick Winter	TV series, 1 episode	
1989-92	Tanamera - Lion of Singapore	Bonnard	TV series, 7 episodes	
1992	The Adventures of Skippy	Uncle Jerry	TV series, 1 episode	
1993	E Street	Conrad Vargas	TV series, 2 episodes	
	Marlin Bay		TV series	
1993–94	Paradise Beach	Tom Barsby	TV series, 254 episodes	
1995	Fire	Larry Dempsey	TV series, 1 episode	
1995	Space: Above and Beyond	Jonathan Overmeyer	TV series, 1 episode	
1997	Medivac	Bruce	TV series, 1 episode	
1997-98	Flipper	Steve / Andrew	TV series, 2 episodes	
1998	The Day of the Roses	Station Officer	TV miniseries, 2 episodes	
1999	Stingers	Terry Darzinger	TV series, 1 episode	
1999-02	The Lost World	Dr William Maple White	TV series, 4 episodes	
2000	Tales of the South Seas		TV series, 1 episode	
2001	Outriders	Jansen	TV series, 3 episodes	
2003	Fat Cow Motel	Elridge	TV series, 1 episode	
2001–04	All Saints	Professor Richard Craig	TV series, 5 episodes	
2004	Through My Eyes		TV miniseries, 2 episodes	
2006	McLeod's Daughters	Howard Webb	TV series, 1 episode	
2006	Monarch Cove	Alexander Preston	Telenovela, 14 episodes	
2007	The Starter Wife	Paul Devers	TV miniseries, 1 episode	
2008	City Homicide	Alistair	TV series, 1 episode	
2009	Sea Patrol	Lang Calwell	TV series, 1 episode	
2009	Heartbeat	Urquart	TV series, 2 episodes: "Thursday's Children" & "The Middle of Somewhere"	
2011	Terra Nova	Ken Horton	TV series, 1 episode: "Proof"	
2015	House of Hancock	Frank Rinehart	TV miniseries, episode #1.1	
2015–17	A Place to Call Home	Douglas Goddard	TV series, 22 episodes	
2020	The End	Richard	TV series, 1 episode	
2022	Darby and Joan	Ascher	TV miniseries, 1 episode	
2023	Queen of Oz	Bernard	TV series, 6 episodes	

== Theatre ==
Year	Title	Role	Notes
1985	Arms and the Man		Nimrod Theatre Company
1987	Tartuffe		Nimrod Theatre Company
1987	The Winter's Tale		Nimrod Theatre Company
2006	John Gabriel Borkman	Borkman	Queensland Theatre Company
