= The Cape (1996 TV series) =

American television series

- Created by: Kary Antholis; George Zaloom
- Developed by: Paris Qualles
- Starring: Corbin Bernsen; Adam Baldwin; Cameron Bancroft; Tyra Ferrell; Bobby Hosea; Katie Mitchell; Bobbie Phillips; Chad Willett; David Kelsey; Whitman Mayo
- Theme music composer: John Debney
- Opening theme: "The Cape Theme"
- Country of origin: United States
- Original language: English
- No. of series: 1
- No. of episodes: 22

Production
- Executive producer: Gil Grant
- Production location: Cape Canaveral, Florida
- Running time: 42 minutes
- Production companies: Zaloom-Mayfield Productions; MTM Enterprises

Original release
- Network: Syndicated
- Release: September 9, 1996 – May 19, 1997

The Cape is an American dramatic TV series, with elements of science fiction, action/adventure, and drama, that was produced for syndication during the 1996–97 television season. The Cape told the story of select members of the NASA Astronaut Corps at the Kennedy Space Center in Florida with a focus on their personal lives as they train for, and execute, Space Shuttle missions. The series stars Corbin Bernsen as USAF Colonel Henry J. "Bull" Eckert, an experienced astronaut who, early in the series, was the Director of Astronaut Training but later in the series was also tasked with the responsibility of Chief of the Astronaut Office.

The series focused on authenticity and was filmed in and around Cape Canaveral, Florida. Former astronaut Buzz Aldrin also served as technical consultant.

== Cast ==
- Corbin Bernsen as Col. Henry J. "Bull" Eckert
- Adam Baldwin as Col. Jack Riles
- Cameron Bancroft as Capt. Zeke Beaumont
- Tyra Ferrell as Tamara St. James
- Bobby Hosea as Maj. Reggie Warren
- Katie Mitchell as Chief PAO Andrea Miller (called Andrea Wyler in the pilot episode)
- Bobbie Phillips as Lt. Commander Barbara DeSantos
- Chad Willett as Peter Engel
- David Kelsey as D.B. Woods

== Episodes ==
No.	Title	Directed by	Written by	Original release date
1	"Pilot"	Ian Toynton	Paris Qualles	September 9, 1996
2	"Pilot"	Ian Toynton	Paris Qualles	September 9, 1996
3	"In Friends We Trust"	Thomas J. Wright	Gil Grant & Charles Heit	September 16, 1996
4	"No Fear"	Harry Harris	Paris Qualles	September 23, 1996
5	"Just a Rumor"	Thomas J. Wright	Marjorie David	September 30, 1996
6	"Play Astronaut for Me"	Jon Cassar	Jennifer Cecil	October 7, 1996
7	"Lost in Space"	Jon Cassar	John Scheinfeld	October 14, 1996
8	"Family Values"	Johnny Jensen	Marjorie David	October 21, 1996
9	"Buried in Peace"	Reza Badiyi	Todd Ellis Kessler	October 28, 1996
10	"The Need to Know"	Anson Williams	David Wilkes	November 4, 1996
11	"Reggie's Wild Ride"	Anson Williams	Story by : Winston Gieseke & Scott Carter; Teleplay by : Paris Qualles	November 11, 1996
12	"Burning Fuse"	John Behring	Todd Ellis Kessler	November 18, 1996
13	"Judgment Call"	Reza Badiyi	Paul Robert Coyle	November 25, 1996
14	"The Accusation"	James Chressanthis	Marcel Montecino	December 30, 1996
15	"Interpretations"	Steve Stafford	Julie Friedgen	January 27, 1997
16	"Hurricane"	Ian Toynton	Todd Ellis Kessler	February 3, 1997
17	"The Last to Know"	Steve Stafford	Tyler Bensinger	February 10, 1997
18	"The Astronaut Formerly Known as Prince"	Jon Cassar	Charles Heit	February 17, 1997
19	"Enemy Within"	Harry Harris	David Erhman	February 24, 1997
20	"Just Like Old Times"	Steve Stafford	Colleen O'Dwyer	May 5, 1997
21	"Mir, Mir, Off the Wall: Part 1"	Reza Badiyi	Story by : Paris Qualles; Teleplay by : Paul Robert Coyle	May 12, 1997
22	"Mir, Mir, Off the Wall: Part 2"	Reza Badiyi	Paris Qualles	May 19, 1997

== Awards ==
Composers John Debney and Louis Febre won Emmy Awards for their music on The Cape in 1997. The series was also nominated in the Outstanding Sound Editing For A Series and Outstanding Main Title Music for a series in 1997.
