= List of Flipper (1995 TV series) episodes =

The following is a list of episodes for the 1995 TV series, Flipper. The series premiered on October 2, 1995 and concluded on July 1, 2000.

== Series overview ==
Season	Episodes	Originally released	
Season	Episodes	First released	Last released
1	22	October 2, 1995	May 13, 1996
2	22	October 5, 1996	May 18, 1997
3	17	September 5, 1998	February 27, 1999
4	27	August 28, 1999	July 1, 2000

== Episode list ==
=== Season 1 (1995–96) ===
No. overall	No. in season	Title	Directed by	Written by	Original release date	Prod. code
1	1	"Pilot"	Tommy Lee Wallace	Story by : E.F. Wallengren & Michael Nankin & Herbert Wright; Teleplay by : E.F. Wallengren & Michael Nankin	October 2, 1995	9401
Dr. Keith Ricks returns to Bal Harbor in the Florida Keys to lead a dolphin research team at the Bal Harbor Research Institute. Dr. Pam Blondel, a naval officer, joins Ricks’ team at the institute to perform echolocation and dolphin research but her son Mike isn’t happy with his new living situation.
2	2	"Treasure Hunt"	Donald Crombie	Story by : Joe Viola; Teleplay by : E.F. Wallengren & William Schwartz	October 9, 1995	9503
A band of pirates attacks the yacht of Andre Slater, a wealthy lawyer. The crooks destroy it with an explosion that scares off a local dolphin pod. Keith grows suspicious when a salvage boat arrives in the wake of the blast and later learns the yacht was carrying mysterious cargo.
3	3	"Green Freak"	Donald Crombie	Terry Erwin	October 16, 1995	9505
After blowing up a shrimp trawler, a psychotic environmental activist known as the “Green Freak”, sets his sights on the institute and plants a bomb in one of its computers. At the institute, Keith and Pam decide to go to a seminar on bat sonar.
4	4	"True Believer"	Ian Barry	Story by : Scott Frost; Teleplay by : Tracy Friedman & Scott Frost	October 23, 1995	9504
Keith and his friend Alan, a tuna fisherman, spend the day diving. A doctored videotape is broadcast showing Alan brutalizing a dolphin caught in his net. Keith later discovers that his friend was unjustly framed by his wife and her scheming lover.
5	5	"Kidnapped: Part 1"	Brian Trenchard-Smith	William Schwartz	October 30, 1995	9501
A shady hotel owner offers Keith $10,000 to buy one of his institutes dolphins to star in an aquatic show at his new Cuban resort. When Keith refuses, Flipper is captured. Keith attempts to sneak into Cuba to rescue Flipper, but is soon caught and arrested.
6	6	"Kidnapped: Part 2"	Brian Trenchard-Smith	William Schwartz	November 6, 1995	9502
In part two, Flipper refuses to perform for the grand opening of the Cuban hotel resort. With the help of a beautiful local woman, Keith breaks out of jail and plots to rescue Flipper before the vengeful resort owner can hurt the reluctant dolphin.
7	7	"With Brothers Like This"	Rob Stewart	Greg Strangis	November 13, 1995	9507
When Flipper helps Keith, Pam and Alex discover an illegal shark-finning line, the team find several sharks hooked and finless. They immediately file a report with the marine patrol, which sends older brother Sandy to investigate.
8	8	"Submersible"	Peter Fisk	William Schwartz	November 20, 1995	9506
Mike and Maya take the institute’s new submersible out to sea to try to photograph a mermaid they think they saw. Mike’s inexperience piloting the sub places them in a deadly peril when they get trapped hundreds of feet below the ocean surface.
9	9	"F. Scott"	Brendan Maher	William Schwartz	November 27, 1995	9508
Pam’s ex-husband Scott, unexpectedly shows up at the institute. Mike sees it as a chance to reunite his parents with the help of Maya’s magic charm. But tensions rise when it becomes clear the former couple does not seem to be made for each other.
10	10	"That's a Moray!"	Rob Stewart	Lee Goldberg & William Rabkin	December 4, 1995	9509
Keith and Mike are on a diving exercise with Flipper when they inadvertently disrupt a photographer during an underwater photo shoot. Eager to show there are no hard feelings, the photographer invites Keith and Mike to her exhibition.
11	11	"Fish Out of Water"	Rob Stewart	Shelly Zellman & Jeff Stepakoff	January 8, 1996	9511
A young teenager is rescued from a raft at sea and is oblivious to her surroundings and the attentions of Flipper. Her condition is monitored by Dr. Hanson and Commander Tolliver who soon become concerned at their patient’s lack of progress.
12	12	"Pearl Maker"	Chris Thomson	E.F. Wallengren	January 15, 1996	9512
Keith brings Pam to an exotic, secluded coral reef after being brought to his attention from Flipper, only to be captured by two thugs. A shadowy figure interrogates them, pressing them as to what they are doing there. Not believing they are scientists, the thugs dump Keith and Pam overboard.
13	13	"Missile Crisis"	Chris Thomson	Ali Adler & Terence Winter	January 22, 1996	9510
Maya gets annoyed with Mike for procrastinating on the work they’ve been doing on a school project. Meanwhile, international criminals force Keith and his friend Garcia to help them locate a Cuban nuclear missile submerged in Florida coastal waters.
14	14	"Hurricane"	Darryl Sheen	Tracy Friedman	January 29, 1996	9513
A hurricane rips into the coastline just as Aphrodite, one of the institute’s dolphins, is about to give birth. Mike leaves the shelter and braves the storm when he can’t reach Pam on the phone, who has decided to stay at the institute with Keith to help Aphrodite.
15	15	"Surf Gang"	Greg Prange	William Schwartz	February 5, 1996	9514
While Keith and Pam try to persuade a wealthy patron to donate to the institute, Mike and Maya meet a local surfer, Jinx, who promises to teach them to surf but, in the process, gets them mixed up with a gang of hip, young hoodlums.
16	16	"Monkey Island"	Brian Wimmer	Eric Estrin & Michael Berlin	February 12, 1996	9516
Monkey Island is a forbidden place, marked with warning signs prohibiting entry. Naturally, Mike and Maya pay the island a visit with Flipper and unknowingly bring home a stowaway monkey infected with a deadly virus. They agree to keep their little adventure a secret.
17	17	"Menace to Seaciety"	Donald Crombie	Tracy Friedman	February 19, 1996	9517
After being rammed during a swim, a spoiled teen wakes up in the hospital with injuries and points to Flipper as his attacker. Things look worse for the dolphin when Keith’s satellite tracking device confirms that Flipper was in the area of the time of the attack.
18	18	"The Girl Who Came to Dinner"	Donald Crombie	E.F. Wallengren & William Schwartz	April 15, 1996	9615
Maya entrusts Mike with a family secret, but a surprise visitor from her past threatens to reveal it all. Meanwhile, the institute is turned upside down when a self-important benefactor moves in and attempts to reorganize its operations.
19	19	"Muddy Waters"	Tommy Lee Wallace	Greg Strangis	April 22, 1996	9403
Flipper’s new pal falls sick after coming in contact with a toxic substance and beaches herself near the institute. While Keith and Pam desperately seek to locate the pollution’s source, more dolphins wash up with the same life-threatening symptoms.
20	20	"Past Tense"	Brendan Maher	Lee Goldberg & William Rabkin	April 29, 1996	9519
Dangerous mishaps start occurring after Bal Harbor University gets a new student, an ex-con whose brother Keith helped put in jail. The psychopath is seeking vengeance not just on Keith alone, he’s determined to hurt Keith’s friends as well.
21	21	"Sharks!"	Tommy Lee Wallace	Story by : E.F. Wallengren & Herbert Wright; Teleplay by : E.F. Wallengren	May 6, 1996	9402
Reports of shark attacks crop up at a beach property that is slated for a new hotel resort. Further complications arise as a hotelier plans to sabotage the building of his competitor’s resort by transferring endangered species of fish to its waters.
22	22	"Flipper Speaks!"	Darryl Sheen	William Schwartz	May 13, 1996	9518
Keith invents an echo-location device to emit clicks and whistles to Aphrodite, and then translates her responses into audible speech. A rival scientist, Dr. Albert Vanhoff, dismisses Keith’s invention as an absurd fairy tale.

=== Season 2 (1996–97) ===
No. overall	No. in season	Title	Directed by	Written by	Original release date	Prod. code
23	1	"The White Dolphin"	Brian Trenchard-Smith	Reuben Leder	October 5, 1996	9625
The Bal Harbor Institute gets a new director after Kieth and Pam are transferred, Maya becomes an intern at the institute accompanied by two new interns. Next door a new search and rescue station opens up ready to respond to any emergency that comes their way. Elsewhere Flipper becomes friends with a rare albino dolphin which gets the attention of an animal collector who plans to capture the majestic dolphin.
24	2	"Sea Horse"	Donald Crombie	Phil Combest	October 12, 1996	9624
Cap helps a friend save a racehorse from her estranged husband who is involved in a deadly insurance scheme.
25	3	"Ghost Ship"	Brendan Maher	Phil Combest	October 19, 1996	9626
A 17th-century pirate ship fires on the Maria D which puts Cap in the hospital and has nightmares about pirates. The same ship raids an art auction yacht which becomes suspicious to Tom and Quinn.
26	4	"The Sword of Carlos de Cabral"	Donald Crombie	Tracy Friedman	October 25, 1996	9627
Maya is captivated by a young man who sailed from Portugal to the Keys to find proof that his ancestors discovered America prior to Columbus.
27	5	"Radio Free Flipper"	Brian Trenchard-Smith	Reuben Leder	November 2, 1996	9628
In trouble with the FCC and his girlfriend, an offshore radio station operator gets some much needed help from Flipper and a local dolphin pod. It also draws attention from the institute thinking the dj’s loud music would affect the dolphins’ hearing and echolocation.
28	6	"A Day At The Boat Races"	Colin Budds	Stephen A. Miller	November 9, 1996	9629
Craig's pal has a fuel-injection system that will revolutionize power-boat racing; a saboteur who happens to be his competitor has other plans to stop him from winning the boat race.
29	7	"Maternity Test"	Donald Crombie	Stephen A. Miller	November 16, 1996	9630
A baby whom Flipper finds in a raft becomes a pawn in an international intrigue. Flipper brings the baby to Maya where she hides from Jennifer and Tom fearing the baby would be taken away to child protective services.
30	8	"Best Of The Beach"	Mark DeFriest	Reuben Leder	November 23, 1996	9631
Eager for ratings, Tom’s former sweetheart, a beach volleyball professional, is abducted by her coach so a younger player can take her place in a tournament.
31	9	"Wedding Bell Blues"	Brian Trenchard-Smith	Stephen A. Miller	January 4, 1997	9623
Quinn’s wedding at sea hits rough sailing when a revenge-minded drug dealer hijacks the yacht where everyone is on.
32	10	"Ebb Tide"	Donald Crombie	Tracy Friedman	January 12, 1997	9633
Jennifer’s new attraction to a lifeguard who was once Tom’s mentor causes friction. His performance is slipping to a serious matter that requires medical attention.
33	11	"Long Weekend"	Colin Budds	Reuben Leder	January 19, 1997	9635
What should be a recreational holiday weekend turns into life-threatening situations. Flipper is attacked by a great white when he tried to fend off the shark from Cap and Quinn who were out fishing and Tom and Jennifer are stranded on an island when the search and rescue chopper has electrical problems.
34	12	"Paradise Found"	Colin Budds	Stephen A. Miller	January 26, 1997	9632
While collecting samples for a project at the institute, Holly and Dean are shipwrecked on an island inhabited for 12 years by lost children led by aggressive teenage males.
35	13	"Flipper Goes To Miami"	Mark DeFriest	Phil Combest	February 2, 1997	9634
A couple of steady crooks capture Aphrodite in hopes of using her to murder a prominent public official. Flipper follows the crooks closely behind.
36	14	"Beach Music"	Donald Crombie	Stephen A. Miller	February 9, 1997	9636
A supercomputer prototype on loan to Jennifer helps unravel the mystery of an itinerant blues musician who is being followed by a man wanting to end his life.
37	15	"Help Me, Rhonda"	Ian Gilmour	Phil Combest	February 16, 1997	9637
Jennifer and the interns become suspicious of a young woman who seems to be enjoying Cap’s company a little too much.
38	16	"La Sirene Maya"	Darryl Sheen	Reuben Leder	February 23, 1997	9638
Maya inherits a charm from her grandmother that gives her clairvoyant powers after a biking accident renders her unconscious.
39	17	"Mermaid Island"	Donald Crombie	Tracy Friedman	March 2, 1997	9639
A mysterious woman emerges from the waters of an island in dispute, and her fingerprints match those of a girl who drowned 12 years earlier.
40	18	"The Package"	Donald Crombie	Phil Combest	April 20, 1997	9642
Maya and Flipper’s telepathic communication is needed when Tom is threatened by a man who hid incriminating computer disks in Jennifer’s luggage.
41	19	"Retribution Beach"	Ian Gilmour	Reuben Leder	April 27, 1997	9641
Tom pleads self-defense when he shoots his former commander who came to Bal Harbor seeking revenge.
42	20	"On The Ropes"	Scott Hartford-Davis	Gregory S. Dinallo	May 4, 1997	9640
Tom and Quinn organize a charity boxing match that attracts Dean and a young man who has a lot to lose if he enters the ring.
43	21	"Target Practice"	Scott Hartford-Davis	Stephen A. Miller	May 11, 1997	9634
While on a little getaway cruise, Tom, Jennifer, Dean and Holly get shipwrecked and find land on a nearby island, unaware that the island is being used for target practice from the Navy.
44	22	"Reflections"	Brendan Maher	Stephen A. Miller & Reuben Leder	May 18, 1997	9644
As a hurricane approaches the Bal Harbor coast, Maya reminisces her life and friends when she becomes trapped in a storm drainage ditch after breaking her leg.

=== Season 3 (1998–99) ===
No. overall	No. in season	Title	Directed by	Written by	Original release date	Prod. code
45	1	"A Fine Romance"	Donald Crombie	Shane Brennan	September 5, 1998	9801
Chris tries everything to stop his mother from marrying Tom.
46	2	"The Mayday Kid"	Donald Crombie	Christopher Lee	September 12, 1998	9802
When mayday calls seem like a hoax, Tom starts to think Chris might have something to do with it...
47	3	"Swimming With Sharks"	Brendan Maher	Deborah Parsons	September 19, 1998	9803
When an environmental disaster hits, it turns out to be political.
48	4	"U-Boat"	Gregory Nottage	Everett DeRoche	September 26, 1998	9804
When Alex and Holly finds a submarine while diving, it turns out to be an old German war-sub.
49	5	"Sea Demons"	Brendan Maher	Annie Fox	October 3, 1998	9805
When Jackie and Chris go out to look for sea monsters they end up stranded on Albino Island and make a new friend.
50	6	"Missing"	Gregory Nottage	Graham Hartley	October 10, 1998	9807
An old friend of Holly goes diving with Cap & Alex and ends up missing.
51	7	"The Outsiders"	Donald Crombie	Anne Brooksbank	October 17, 1998	9806
Chris tries to fit in with the wrong kids and ends up in trouble.
52	8	"Splashdown"	Brendan Maher	Everett DeRoche & Shane Brennan	October 24, 1998	9808
When a Chinese satellite crashes in Bal Harbor, Cap's in for a surprise!
53	9	"Big Fish, Little Fish"	Donald Crombie	Susan MacGillicuddy	November 7, 1998	9809
When the Maria D breaks down, Cap has to stay with the Hamptons until he can get her repaired.
54	10	"Thanksgiving"	Colin Budds	Max Dann	November 21, 1998	9811
When the kids' grandma comes to visit, she can't stop comparing Tom to Jack, Alex’s late husband.
55	11	"Silent Night"	Donald Crombie	Susan MacGillicuddy	December 12, 1998	9813
Tom's niece Courtney comes to spends Christmas with them. Then she falls in love with a young teen who appears to be on the run.
56	12	"Storm Island"	Gregory Nottage	Shane Brennan	January 2, 1999	9810
A family vacation turns horribly wrong, and endangers Alex's life.
57	13	"Lost and Found"	Mark DeFriest	Elizabeth Coleman	January 9, 1999	9812
Chris helps to re-unite a father and son.
58	14	"The Challenge"	Colin Budds	Greg Millin & Yuki Asano	January 23, 1999	9814
An old friend of Mark shows up in town and turns his world upside down.
59	15	"Fallen Hero"	Mark DeFriest	Shane Brennan	January 30, 1999	9815
When Jackie's hero shows up in town she's very excited to meet her, only to find out that hero's aren't always what they seem like.
60	16	"Predator"	Donald Crombie	Philip Dalkin	February 20, 1999	9816
Alex faces a shark head-on to save someone's life.
61	17	"Stars & Stripes"	Colin Budds	Everett DeRoche	February 27, 1999	9817
A woman's search for the truth about her father's death, unveils a secret the Navy's been keeping for a long time.

=== Season 4 (1999–2000) ===
No. overall	No. in season	Title	Directed by	Written by	Original release date	Prod. code
62	1	"Wreck of the Zephyr"	Mark DeFriest	Shane Brennan	August 28, 1999	9818
When Courtney's mom comes to visit, they end up fighting about everything and Sara ends up in a dangerous situation.
63	2	"One Perfect Day"	Ian Gilmour	Philip Dalkin	September 4, 1999	9819
Mark takes Chris and three other kids on a boating trip. Chris, Brad and Eugene end up working together to save Mark and Joey's lives.
64	3	"A Helping Hand"	Michael Pattinson	Greg Millin	September 11, 1999	9820
While diving, Holly's life is put in danger by her friend's panic attack.
65	4	"The Wish"	Mark DeFriest	Yuki Asano, Philip Dalkin, & Greg Millin	September 18, 1999	9821
A dying girl's one wish is to swim with a dolphin, so Courtney and Jackie try to arrange for her to swim with Flipper.
66	5	"Saving Tom"	Robert Florio	Anne Brooksbank	September 25, 1999	9822
An emergency call comes through while Tom and Chris are diving and he ends up in hospital.
67	6	"Spring Break"	Catherine Millar	Philip Dalkin	October 2, 1999	9923
Courtney learns about the perils of drinking.
68	7	"Blind Faith"	Ian Gilmour	Sue Hore	October 16, 1999	9924
Tom loses confidence after a rescue attempt fails.
69	8	"Nickels & Dimes"	Michael Pattinson	Yuki Asano, Philip Dalkin, Leon Saunders, & Shane Brennan	November 6, 1999	9925
Chris befriends an elderly man who mourns the son that drowned at sea.
70	9	"Hurricane"	Catherine Millar	Peter Kinlock	November 13, 1999	9926
Courtney receives a letter from her mom about attending school back in DC. Elsewhere a hurricane heads toward Bal Harbor forcing everyone to take shelter from the storm.
71	10	"Free-Diving"	Ian Gilmour	Yuki Asano, Greg Millin, & Philip Dalkin	December 4, 1999	9927
Holly and Courtney help a diver try for a world record.
72	11	"A Night to Remember"	Michael Pattinson	Shane Brennan & Philip Dalkin	December 25, 1999	9928
Tom and Alex mark their anniversary.
73	12	"Princess Weekend"	Gregory Nottage	Max Dann	January 1, 2000	9929
Jackie’s friend Susy runs away from Princess Weekend after hearing her parents argue before setting out on their trip.
74	13	"Waterworld"	Ian Gilmour	Yuki Asano, Philip Dalkin, & Greg Millin	January 15, 2000	9930
A diver looking for Atlantis saves Courtney.
75	14	"Black Dolphin"	Michael Pattinson	Morgan Fahey	January 22, 2000	9931
Flipper is blamed for attacks in a cove near Bal Harbor when a Navy-Trained dolphin is responsible. Elsewhere Chris gets picked on by a kid at school.
76	15	"Class"	Gregory Nottage	Yuki Asano, Philip Dalkin, & Greg Millin	January 29, 2000	9932
A wealthy thrill-seeker tries to corrupt the Hamptons.
77	16	"The Inquiry"	Robert Florio	Philip Dalkin	February 19, 2000	9933
Delaney is accused of negligence after a rescue.
78	17	"Cap in Love"	Arnie Custo	Susan MacGillicuddy	March 18, 2000	9934
Audrey helps Cap reunite with an old flame.
79	18	"Message in a Bottle"	Gregory Nottage	Yuki Asano	March 25, 2000	9935
Jackie and Audrey trace a message in a bottle.
80	19	"Going Solo"	Scott Feeney	Shane Brennan, Yuki Asano, Sam Carroll, & Philip Dalkin	April 1, 2000	9936
A solo yachtswoman learns an important lesson about human nature.
81	20	"Kidd's Treasure"	Arnie Custo	Shane Brennan, Yuki Asano, Sam Carroll, & Philip Dalkin	April 8, 2000	9937
Chris attempts to find buried treasure.
82	21	"Mr. Mom"	Michael Pattinson	Stuart Wood	April 15, 2000	9938
Alex is called to do some Naval training away from home. But who will look after the everyday chores? It all falls on the shoulders of Tom to pay Mr Mom.
83	22	"Mystery Ship"	Scott Feeney	Greg Millin	May 20, 2000	9939
Holly and Delaney discover a haunted yacht.
84	23	"Re-Educating Rita"	Arnie Custo	Richard Redlin, Sam Carroll, Yuki Asano, & Philip Dalkin	May 27, 2000	9940
Flipper brings a sick dolphin to the Institute, placing the other dolphins at risk.
85	24	"The Survivor"	Whip Hubley	Shane Brennan	June 3, 2000	9941
Alex and Holly find a raft adrift with a woman aboard.
86	25	"Destiny"	Scott Feeney	Jason Herbison	June 10, 2000	9942
Courtney and Jackie meet a young princess who’s running away from an arranged marriage, then she learns what it’s like to live free from her royal duties until someone she knows comes looking for her.
87	26	"Prodigal Father"	Donald Crombie	Philip Dalkin	June 17, 2000	9943
Courtney's father is missing and feared dead, so Tom and Mark go investigate his disappearance.
88	27	"The Dreaming"	Geoff Cox	Shane Brennan	July 1, 2000	9944
Flipper gets caught in a fishing net and then becomes stranded in a tidal lagoon. As the tide recedes, Jackie falls ill, and Flipper's situation is revealed to her in a nightmare.
