= Flipper (1995 TV series) =

American television series (1995–2000)

- Based on: Flipper by Ricou Browning; Jack Cowden
- Developed by: E.F. Wallengren; Michael Nankin; Reuben Leder
- Starring: Brian Wimmer; Colleen Flynn; Payton Haas; Jessica Alba; Whip Hubley; Elizabeth Morehead; Wren T. Brown; Scott Michaelson; Anja Coleby; Gus Mercurio; Tiffany Lamb; Darrin Klimek; Craig Marriott; Laura Donaldson; Skye Patch
- Countries of origin: United States; Australia
- Original language: English
- No. of seasons: 4
- No. of episodes: 87 (including one two-part episode) (list of episodes)

Production
- Executive producers: Jeffrey M. Hayes; E.F. Wallengren; Reyben Leder; Samuel Goldwyn, Jr.
- Producers: Gregory Prange; Darryl Sheen; Robert Florio
- Running time: 43–44 minutes
- Production companies: Samuel Goldwyn Television; Village Roadshow Pictures Television; MGM Television; Coote-Hayes Productions

Original release
- Network: Syndication; PAX
- Release: October 2, 1995 – July 1, 2000

Related
- Flipper

Flipper (also known as Flipper – The New Adventures) is an American revival television series of the original 1964 Flipper television series. The first two seasons aired in first-run syndication; seasons three and four aired on the PAX network.

The series was set in a town named Bal Harbor that was supposed to be in the Florida Keys region (an actual town in Florida has a similar name, Bal Harbour, Florida just north of the City of Miami Beach). It was largely filmed, though, in Gold Coast, Queensland, Australia. The show's first three episodes were filmed in Pigeon Key, Florida, and at the Dolphin Research Center in Grassy Key, Florida, however two of the three episodes aired toward the end of the first season.

The series is unrelated to the 1996 film of the same title, which was also a remake of the 1960s TV series and films.

== Plot ==
Season 1 opens with the character Keith "Bud" Ricks (Brian Wimmer), shown as a child in the original 1964 Flipper series but now grown to an adult working as a scientist performing dolphin research at the Bal Harbour Research Institute in the Florida Keys. Pam Blondell (Colleen Flynn) a naval officer, relocated to the Florida Keys to join Ricks at the institute to perform dolphin research. Blondell is accompanied by her son Mike (Payton Haas), a rebellious teen. Mike is unhappy about the move until he meets Maya Graham (Jessica Alba), a free-spirited 14-year-old girl who has a special connection with dolphin Flipper and the ocean. On a few occasions, Mike and Maya would get into some trouble forcing a rescue from Flipper, Keith, and Pam.

At the beginning of season Ricks, Blondell, and Mike are written out of the series by leaving Bal Harbour. Jennifer Daulton takes over as the institute's director. Maya becomes an intern at the institute, while two new interns, Dean Gregson (Scott Michaelson) and Holly Myers (Anja Coleby), are introduced. Next door to the institute, a new substation for Air Sea Rescue opens, introducing Deputies Tom Hampton (Whip Hubley) and Quinn Garnett (Wren T. Brown). The deputies are responsible for rescuing people in trouble at sea, and perform numerous rescues through the season, and also identify those causing harm to the public and environment. Hampton and Daulton have an on-and-off romance during the season. Edward "Cap" Daulton (Gus Mercurio), Daulton's estranged father, also moves to Bal Harbour to try to re-establish a relationship with his daughter. Cap is a charter-boat captain and owns his own boat, the Maria D, named after his late wife.

In season 3, Daulton and Maya are written out of the series by leaving Bal Harbour to perform research in the Red Sea and San Diego. Lt. Alex Parker (Tiffany Lamb), a lieutenant commander in the US Navy, becomes the institute's director, and marries Tom Hampton. Hampton and Parker, along with her two kids, Chris (Craig Marriott) and Jackie (Laura Donaldson), set up housekeeping, and the series begins to focus more on their family. Deputy Mark Delaney (Darrin Klimek) also replaces Garnett as Hampton's partner at the substation. At the marine institute, Holly remains an intern, but Dean leaves. Cap still appears throughout seasons three and four, but is noticeably absent from many episodes. Chris was unhappy about the move to the Florida Keys at first but slowly became accustomed to his new home and Jackie forms an unbreakable bond with Flipper.

In season 4, Tom's niece Courtney Gordon (Skye Patch), moves in with the Hampton/Parker family after being unhappy living with her mother in Washington, DC. Season 4 is essentially a continuation of season 3 with no major changes. Most episodes are self-contained, with very little in the way of serialized storylines between episodes.

The series ends on an initially tragic note as Flipper accidentally becomes beached on a sand dune and is unable to free himself. Upon learning what has happened, the entire cast rushes to the scene, but arrives too late; Flipper's heart stops as they are trying to save him. The final scene of the series shows Jackie mourning Flipper's loss, then he is shown to be alive and the show ends with them playing in the water and she says, "Everything's gonna be just fine".

== Cast and characters ==
=== Main ===
- Brian Wimmer as Dr. Keith Ricks (season 1)
- Colleen Flynn as Dr. Pamela Blondell (season 1)
- Payton Haas as Mike Blondell (season 1)
- Jessica Alba as Maya Graham (seasons 1–2)
- Whip Hubley as Tom Hampton (seasons 2–4)
- Elizabeth Morehead as Dr. Jennifer Daulton (season 2)
- Wren T. Brown as Quinn Garnett (season 2)
- Scott Michaelson as Dean Gregson (season 2)
- Anja Coleby as Holly (seasons 2–4)
- Gus Mercurio as Edward Walter "Cap" Daulton (seasons 2–4)
- Tiffany Lamb as Lt. Cmdr. Alexandra "Alex" Parker–Hampton (seasons 3–4)
- Craig Marriott as Christopher "Chris" Parker (seasons 3–4)
- Laura Donaldson as Jacqueline "Jackie" Parker (seasons 3–4)
- Darrin Klimek as Deputy Mark Delaney (seasons 3–4)
- Skye Patch as Courtney Gordon (season 4; guest season 3)

=== Recurring ===
- Elizabeth Lackey as Alexis (season 1)
- Christopher Kirby as Captain John Dyer (season 1)
- Shé D'Montford as Various (seasons 2–4)
- Regis Broadway as Brad (guest season 3; recurring season 4)
- Gabriella Florio as Suzy (guest season 3; recurring season 4)

Since Flipper was filmed in Australia, producers had to rely heavily on Australian talent. Several regular cast members and most guest stars spoke their dialogue using non-native American accents. During seasons three and four, Whip Hubley and Gus Mercurio were the only American actors in the main cast. All other main characters were portrayed by Australian or Canadian actors.

Flipper had many notable guest stars, including Alan Dale, Dwight Schultz, Nicholas Hammond, Jane Badler, Robert Coleby (father of Anja Coleby), and Season Hubley (real-life sister of Whip Hubley). In fact, many of these guest stars made more than one appearance, portraying different characters each time. Seasons three and four regular cast member Darrin Klimek also appeared briefly as a different character in the season-one episode "Treasure Hunt".

== Episodes ==
Season	Episodes	Originally released	
Season	Episodes	First released	Last released
1	22	October 2, 1995	May 13, 1996
2	22	October 5, 1996	May 18, 1997
3	17	September 5, 1998	February 27, 1999
4	27	August 28, 1999	July 1, 2000

== DVD releases ==
MGM Home Entertainment released the first season of on DVD on June 3, 2010, as a manufacture-on-demand (MOD) DVD-R.

On April 2, 2013, TGG Direct released seasons 2–4 on Region 1 DVD.

== Locations ==
The primary setting for Flipper was the Bal Harbor Research Institute, a fictional dolphin research facility funded by fictional Bal Harbor University.

Between seasons one and two, the Air Sea Rescue Substation was built next door to the research institute when the series began focusing less on ocean- and dolphin research-based plots. The Air Sea Rescue was located directly on the beach and had access to its own helicopter and hovercraft for rescues. A speedboat was also added in season three.

The Shipwreck was a restaurant located between the marine institute and the substation. The restaurant opened in season two and was featured until the end of the series. During season one, the Shipwreck's building was the residence of Dr. Keith Ricks.

At the start of season three, Tom Hampton married Alex Parker and they moved into a house with Alex's children, Chris and Jackie. The house contained an in-ground swimming pool and large dock.

=== Filming locations ===
Initial production on Flipper began in the Florida Keys, with the pilot and two other episodes filmed there in season one. Three locations were used for the Bal Harbor Research Institute, including Pigeon Key and the Dolphin Research Center on Grassy Key, with a third location used for the beach where Maya first meets Mike. A fourth location, just east of Conch Key adjacent to Overseas Highway 1, was used when Maya meets Keith in a Jeep to inform him Mike is in trouble. This is the same location used in the movie True Lies.

Three different filming locations were used to portray the research institute. The pool area of the institute was filmed at Sea World, Gold Coast. The two-story building was notable for being the only set used for the entire run of the series, although it did not appear in every episode. The same set was reused with little modification for other film and television productions such as Sabrina Down Under. After filming on Flipper wrapped, the building was demolished to accommodate Sea World's Imagine Dolphin Show attraction located nearby. Although the area is unrecognizable today, an aerial shot in the season-one episode "F. Scott" shows the original configuration of the building at Sea World.

During the first two seasons only, indoor office space for the institute also appears. It is believed that this was filmed on a soundstage at either Sea World or Warner Bros. Movie World.

The exterior façade of the institute's building along the waterfront were filmed in park space abutting the Gold Coast Broadwater located in Southport, Queensland (a suburb of Gold Coast) near Ephraim Island. The Ephraim Island road bridge is visible in many waterfront shots in the latter half of the series. The same location was used for the Air Sea Rescue Substation and The Shipwreck. All three buildings along the beachfront and park space were demolished in the early 2000s to make way for apartment buildings and a small harbour.

The Hampton/Parker family home was filmed at an actual house (now known as McKinnon House) located at 1 Howard St. in the Gold Coast suburb of Runaway Bay. The house was located just south of the research institute, substation, and shipwreck filming locations. The exterior of the house today is relatively unchanged since filming of Flipper wrapped in 2000.

Numerous scenes were filmed in and under the water. Many scenes above water were filmed in the channels and islands of the Gold Coast Broadwater, while some diving scenes were filmed in giant water tanks located at Warner Bros. Movie World.

== Awards and nominations ==
Daytime Emmy Awards

- 1996 – Outstanding Sound Mixing – Paul Brincat, Kevin Patrick Burns, Jon Taylor, and Christian P. Minkler (won)
- 1997 – Outstanding Sound Mixing – Jon Taylor, Kevin Patrick Burns, Todd Orr, and Craig Walmsley (won)

== International broadcasters ==
- Australia - Seven Network
- United States - Light TV, Showtime Family Zone (2003)
- India - Pogo - 2004-05
- Indonesia - ANteve - 1997-03
- Latin America - Boomerang
- United Kingdom - Disney Channel - the 1990s.
