= Chameleon (1998 film) =

1998 science fiction TV film

- Film poster
- Genre: Action; Sci-Fi; Thriller
- Written by: Bennett Cohen
- Directed by: Stuart Cooper
- Starring: Bobbie Phillips; Eric Lloyd; John Adam; Jerome Ehlers; Nicholas Bell; Mark Lee
- Music by: Wendy Blackstone
- Country of origin: United States/Australia
- Original language: English

Production
- Producer: Michael Lake
- Production locations: Queensland, Australia
- Cinematography: John Stokes
- Editor: Bill Butler
- Running time: 90 minutes
- Production companies: Village Roadshow Pictures; Wilshire Court Productions

Original release
- Network: UPN
- Release: October 22, 1998

Chameleon is a 1998 American-Australian science fiction action film television movie, written by Bennett Cohen and directed by Stuart Cooper. This is the first installment of the Chameleon film series and was followed by Chameleon II: Death Match and Chameleon 3: Dark Angel. Chameleon was originally aired on October 22, 1998 on UPN.

== Plot ==
Kam (Bobbie Phillips) is a genetic creation, made to be a super killer. She, however, discovers her maternal instincts while trying to protect a child from the government.

== Cast ==
- Bobbie Phillips as Kam
- Eric Lloyd as Ghen, Aede's Son
- John Adam as Madison 'Maddy'
- Jerome Ehlers as Quinn, Former IBI Agent
- Nicholas Bell as Mozser, Cam's Controller
- Mark Lee as Milo
- Nicholas Bell as Kam's Controller
- Laurie Foell as Nana
- Inge Hornstra as Agent Hudson

== Reception ==
Jim McLennan from "Girls with Guns" wrote: "The action here seems restrained; a little gunplay and some minor martial arts, but nothing particularly memorable. The sexual scenes make the made-for-TV origins painfully clear, with sheets that appear to be velcro'd to Phillips’ breasts, when she doesn't have her elbows elegantly positioned in front of them. Still, there's enough here in the central character to make me want to see more...and lo, what's this coming along?" Charles Tatum from "Tatum Reviews Archive" gave the film two out of five stars and wrote: "The story has been done to death, and the film makers cannot decide which audience they want to go for- switching sex scenes with cutesy scenes between the killer cyborg and the adorable kid that are lifted right out of Terminator 2. Space Maggot applauds Phillips, and shoots a vote of 3". Nathan Rabin from The A.V. Club said: "For better or worse, but mainly for worse, Chameleon pounces upon virtually every futuristic-android cliché known to humanity. But what's even more damaging than the film's lack of originality is its moribund pace, which robs it of what little energy it possesses. Even as leering masturbation fodder, Chameleon is a dud, as Cooper's main contribution as a director seems to be his incredible ability to film sex scenes in a way that titillates no one and covers more flesh than a convent in Alaska". Robert Pardi from TV Guide, gave the film two out four stars.

Chameleon was nominated for two awards. One "OFTA Television Award" for "Best Makeup/Hairstyling in a Motion Picture or Miniseries" and one Young Artist Award for "Best Performance in a TV Movie/Pilot/Mini-Series or Series - Supporting Young Actor" for Eric Lloyd.

== Sequel ==
A sequel titled Chameleon II: Death Match was released in 1999.

== See also ==
- List of television films produced for UPN
