= New Zealand National Science Fiction Convention =

The New Zealand National Science Fiction Convention is a volunteer-run science fiction convention that is scheduled annually, and usually takes place either at Easter or at King's Birthday weekend (end of May/early June). It is usually abbreviated as NatCon.

New Zealand's premier science fiction award, the Sir Julius Vogel Award, is presented each year at the national convention.

Unlike the case with many other countries' national conventions, each convention is run by a different committee, unaffiliated with any national fannish body. Bids for running the NatCons are voted on by attendees at the NatCon two years ahead. These votes are organised by the current NatCon committee in liaison with the Science Fiction and Fantasy Association of New Zealand.

In the early years of the national convention, the four main cities (Auckland, Wellington, Christchurch, and Dunedin) all held the NatCon, but in recent years, the conventions have mostly been held in one of the two largest cities, Wellington and Auckland, both in the North Island. In 2020 the 41st NatCon was incorporated into ConNZealand 78th World Science Fiction Convention in Wellington.

== List of New Zealand National Science Fiction Conventions ==
Note: in this list, websites whose addresses end in sf.org.nz are, in most cases, mirrors of the original websites, some of which have been removed.

NatCon no.	year	name	location	guests of honour (GoH)	fan guests of honour (FGoH)
1	1979	Wellcon	Wellington		
2	1980	Wellcon B	Wellington	Merv Binns	
3	1981	Norcon	Auckland	A. Bertram Chandler	
4	1982	Octacon	Dunedin	David Harvey	Frank Macskasy
5	1983	Windycon	Wellington	Harlan Ellison	
6	1984	Norcon II	Auckland	Sandi Hall, David Harvey	
7	1986	Halleycon	Dunedin	Craig Harrison	Frank Macskasy
8	1987	Windycon II '87	Wellington	Joe Haldeman	Alan Robson
9	1988	Confusion	Christchurch	Bjo Trimble, Margaret Mahy	Lana Brown
10	1989	Satyricon	Dunedin	David Brin	Alex Heatley
11	1990	ConVerge 2	Wellington	Tracy Tormé, Richard Arnold	James Benson
12	1991	ForryCon	Wellington	Forrest Ackerman	Tim Jones
13	1992	ShakyCon	Wellington	Joe Haldeman	Rex Thompson
14	1993	DefCon	Wellington	D. C. Fontana, Julian May, Larry Niven, Dennis Skotak, Gail Adams	Mark Harris
15	1994	SiliCon	Dunedin	Barbara Hambly	Tom Cardy
16	1995	Conquest	Auckland	Roger Zelazny, Vonda McIntyre, Richard Taylor, Jane Lindskold	Keith Smith
17	1996	Constellation	Christchurch	Robert Sheckley, Wes Takahashi, Wayne Stables, Margaret Mahy, Ged Maybury	James Dignan
18	1997	Conspiracy	Wellington	Danny John-Jules, Pat Cadigan, Chris Chitty	Dan McCarthy
19	1998	Construction	Wellington	Neil Gaiman, Michael Hurst	Norman Cates
20	1999	Conquest 2	Auckland	Richard Hatch, Alan Dean Foster, John Howe	Mike Hansen
21	2000	Con d'Or	Wellington	Tad Williams, Sean McMullen	Maree Sole
22	2001	Odyssey Con	Auckland	Mercedes Lackey, Larry Dixon, Lyn McConchie, Sean McMullen	Brian Howell
23	2002	Con with the Wind	Wellington	Joe and Gay Haldeman, Dan Hennah, Lucy Sussex, Dale Elvy, Charles N. Brown, Stephen Dedman	Yvonne Harrison, Alan Robson, Renaldo
24	2003	EmotiCon	Auckland	Lois McMaster Bujold, J. G. Hertzler	Mary Maclachlan
25	2004	ConTour	Rotorua	Gregory Benford	Ross Temple
26	2005	iCon	Wellington	Orson Scott Card	Bill Geradts
27	2006	Conclave	Auckland	Steve Jackson, Joan Vinge, Jim Frenkel	Kevin Maclean
28	2007	Conspiracy 2	Wellington	Eric Flint, Dylan Horrocks, Marianne de Pierres, Isobelle Carmody, Fred Gallagher,	Barbara Clendon
29	2008	Conjunction	Wellington	Elizabeth Moon, Kate Orman, Jon Blum, Philippa Ballantine,	Andrew Ivamy
30	2009	Conscription	Auckland	Julie E. Czerneda, Nalini Singh, Russell Kirkpatrick	Robbie Matthews
31	2010	Au Contraire	Wellington	Sean Williams, Elizabeth Knox	Paul Mannering
32	2011	ConText	Auckland	Catherine Asaro	Lynelle Howell
33	2012	UnCONventional	Auckland	Trudi Canavan	Lorain Clark
34	2013	Au Contraire 2013	Wellington	Jennifer Fallon	Anna Klein
35	2014	Conclave II	Auckland	Dave Freer, Lyn McConchie, Paul Scoones	Paul Scoones was upgraded from Fan GoH to full GoH and was not replaced.
36	2015	Reconnaissance	Rotorua	Gail Carriger, Philippa Ballantine, Tee Morris	Alan Parker & Norman Cates
37	2016	Au Contraire 2016	Wellington	Martin Wallace, Stephanie Paul, AJ Fitzwater	
38	2017	LexiCon	Taupō	Seanan McGuire	John Toon, Orville (Ghost of Honour)
39	2018	Conclave 3	Auckland	Karen Miller, Steve Wheeler	Daphne Lawless
40	2019	GeyserCon	Rotorua	Jonathan Maberry, Kaaron Warren	
42	2024	Continuity 2024	Wellington	Allyson Bird	Bill Geradts

=== The issue of 1985 ===
In the late 1970s and early 1980s, some convention bids were made only a year in advance. At Norcon II in 1984 there was no bid by any group to hold a national convention in 1985. One reason for this was an assumption that many New Zealanders would instead attend Aussiecon II, the 1985 Worldcon, in Melbourne, Australia. However, a group from Dunedin at Norcon II announced that it was willing to stage a national convention in 1986, and won the bid for that year's convention. It was then taken for granted that Halleycon in 1986 would be the next national convention - New Zealand's seventh.

A few months after Norcon II, a group of Auckland fans decided to stage Orcon at Easter in 1985 and their publicity called it the seventh national convention. A few weeks before Easter 1985 the Halleycon committee contacted the Orcon committee and made it clear to them that they had no right to call it a national convention. The Orcon committee accepted this - however, by that point, the convention programme booklet had already been printed which stated it was the seventh national convention. All of Halleycon's progress reports and publicity stated that it was the seventh national convention, and the numbering of national conventions has continued from this, with the 1987 convention being officially the eighth New Zealand national convention.

== Other New Zealand science fiction conventions ==
There are occasionally other science fiction conventions held in New Zealand between national conventions. They were particularly common during the 1980s, when they were used by national convention organising committees for fundraising and as a means for testing their convention organisation. As such, they often took place in the same centres as the following year's national convention.

year	name	location	guests of honour (GoH)	fan guests of honour (FGoH)
1985	Dunnycon	Dunedin		
1985	Orcon	Auckland		
1985	Windycon I	Wellington		
1985	Microcon	Dunedin		
1985	Unicon (Microcon II)	Dunedin		
1986	Concerto	Wellington?		
1986	Norcon III	Auckland		
1987	Contiki	Christchurch	Michael Billington	John Knight
1987	Decepticon	Dunedin		Tom Cardy
1987	Concordance	Christchurch	Bjo Trimble	Evan McCarthy
1988	Confederation	Christchurch	Paul Darrow, Michael Keating, Janet Lees-Price	
1988	Converge	Wanganui	David Gerrold, Brent Spiner - last minute cancellation	
1989	Invercon	Invercargill		
1989	Conscience	Auckland	Phillip Mann	
1989	Trakon	Christchurch		Jon Preddle, Paul Scoones
1990	Conterbury	Christchurch		Richard Scheib
1990	WhoCon	Christchurch	Jon Pertwee, Mark Strickson	Dallas Jones, Paul Scoones
1990	Confederation II	Christchurch	Jacqueline Pearce	Sheila Willis
1990	KiwiCon	Auckland	Harry Harrison	
1990	Conflagration	Auckland	Mark Strickson, Phillip Mann, The Wizard of Christchurch	
1991	AbbyCon	Auckland	Phillip Mann	
1991	Relax-a-con	Waitakere		
1991	Fantasy V	Christchurch		
1992	Discontinuity	Auckland	Terry Pratchett	Nicholas Smeaton, Maureen Thomas
1992	Conjecture	Christchurch		
1992	DayCon	Wellington		
1992	Doctorcon 1992	Wellington		
1993	Cybercon 1993	Christchurch		
1994	Ikon	Christchurch	Terry Pratchett	
1994	Continuum	Wellington	Gary Russell	
1995	Fantasy 5	Christchurch		
2012	Octacon 30th anniversary reunion	Dunedin		Frank Macskasy

== Other New Zealand events related to science fiction ==
The Armageddon Expo, an event held annually in several New Zealand cities, is a more commercially orientated event. It is mostly made up of comic, toy, video game and DVD stalls, run by local businesses.
