= National Association for Science Fiction =

The National Association for Science Fiction (NASF), New Zealand's first national science fiction club, was formed in December 1975 by Wellington resident Frank Macskasy. The club expanded over several years and by the early 1980s had branches in Wellington, Auckland, Christchurch and Dunedin, and was for nearly 15 years New Zealand's only nationwide science fiction fan organisation.

The logo of NASF - a kiwi, representing New Zealand, superimposed on a stylised rocket

== History ==
Members in Auckland, Wellington and Dunedin were involved in running national conventions, although none were officially run by NASF, and in many of the fanzines that sprouted up in the late '70s and early '80s, as well as amateur press association Aotearapa. NASF was also a motivating force behind the inauguration of a New Zealand Science Fiction fan awards in the late 1980s (these later reappeared as the Sir Julius Vogel Awards), and was also the umbrella organisation responsible for the appointing of host sites for national conventions.

At its height in the mid-1980s, NASF had a membership of about 150 and a bimonthly club magazine called Warp. By the mid-1990s, the Auckland and Christchurch branches had folded, although there were still club members in those areas. The Dunedin branch and the Wellington branch continued until the late 1990s.

Debate continues on why NASF died, as well as whether it was officially wound up, but it was largely inactive by the mid 1990s and went into indefinite recess in late 1997. The rise of science fiction as a popular genre in the cinema and television, coupled with easier access to science fiction books, magazines, movie and television series on video, and later DVD, possibly contributed to NASF's demise. Considerable infighting within the Wellington and Christchurch branches may also have contributed, along with an unwieldy National Committee. The Phoenix Science Fiction Society was founded in Wellington specifically as an alternative to what was seen as a moribund branch of NASF, draining many active fans away from NASF. Other factors included the growth of the internet, which made an organised club less relevant. In contrast to when Macskasy formed NASF in 1976, by the late 1990s, New Zealanders could soak themselves in science fiction without any need to meet other people with the same interest.

Many of the national functions of NASF were later taken up by the Science Fiction and Fantasy Association of New Zealand (SFFANZ), which was founded in 2002.

== Branches ==
=== Dunedin branch ===
The Dunedin branch of the National Association for Science Fiction (NASF) existed from 1978 until the late 1990s. The branch was the first science fiction club formed in Dunedin and for many years was the southernmost science fiction club in the world. It held fortnightly meetings (later monthly), initially at the children's library in Stuart Street, then at various other venues, the last of which was the W.E.A. building in Crawford Street. The branch organised social events and outings and ran a small lending library. About a dozen people attended the first meetings, but it took till the middle of the year for the official formation of the branch. Membership began to increase as a side effect of Dunedin winning the rights to hold the New Zealand National Science Fiction Convention, Octacon, in 1982. There was also a jump in social gatherings with members meeting every weekend and on some week days.

By 1983, the Dunedin branch was the most socially active within NASF and second in size only to the Wellington branch. Branch members were instrumental in staging other national conventions in Dunedin in 1986, 1989 and 1994. Dunedin branch members contributed to the NASF club fanzine Warp which was edited from Dunedin for several years, but the branch itself did not have a regular branch fanzine or newsletter other than the short-lived Larque's Lament, which ran for five issues in the late 1980s, and a one-off fanzine called Can’t Think of a Name So We Called it This! in 1982. Several branch members were also members of Aotearapa, or published their own fanzines, notably Tom Cardy's Worlds Beyond, which ran for 11 issues.

== See also ==
- Literature in New Zealand
