= Warp (magazine) =

- Cover of issue 81, from late 1991
- Frequency: Bi-monthly
- Publisher: National Association for Science Fiction
- First issue: November 1977
- Country: New Zealand
- ISSN: 0110-7577

Warp was a New Zealand magazine and official organ of the National Association for Science Fiction (NASF), the country's first national science fiction fan organisation.

== History ==
First published in November 1977, Warp continued on a usually two-monthly schedule until the late 1990s, surviving for a short period independently after NASF went into recess. Excluding the APA Aotearapa, Warp was the first New Zealand science fiction publication to reach 100 issues, which it did in June 1995. In all, some 115 editions of Warp were produced. Its largest issues were 44 pages in length.

The location of Warp's publishing varied according to the home city of its editor, although during much of the later 1980s it was based in Christchurch, and during the early and mid 1990s it was based in Dunedin. At times the magazine's schedule was erratic, especially during the late 1980s and shortly before its demise in the late 1990s.

Originally published in A4 format, for much of its run it was A5 in size, returning to A4 shortly before its demise.

== See also ==
- Literature in New Zealand
- List of print media in New Zealand
