= Peter Friend =

Peter Friend may refer to:

- Peter Friend (author), New Zealand science fiction author
- Peter Friend (geologist) (1934–2025), British geologist
- Peter Friend (surgeon), director of the Oxford Transplant Centre

== See also ==
- Peter's Friends
