= Vogel Award =

Vogel Award may refer to:

- The Australian/Vogel Literary Award, for Australian writers under the age of 35
- The Sir Julius Vogel Award, for New Zealand science fiction, fantasy, and horror
