= Lee Murray (writer) =

New Zealand science fiction, fantasy, and horror writer and editor

Lee Murray ONZM
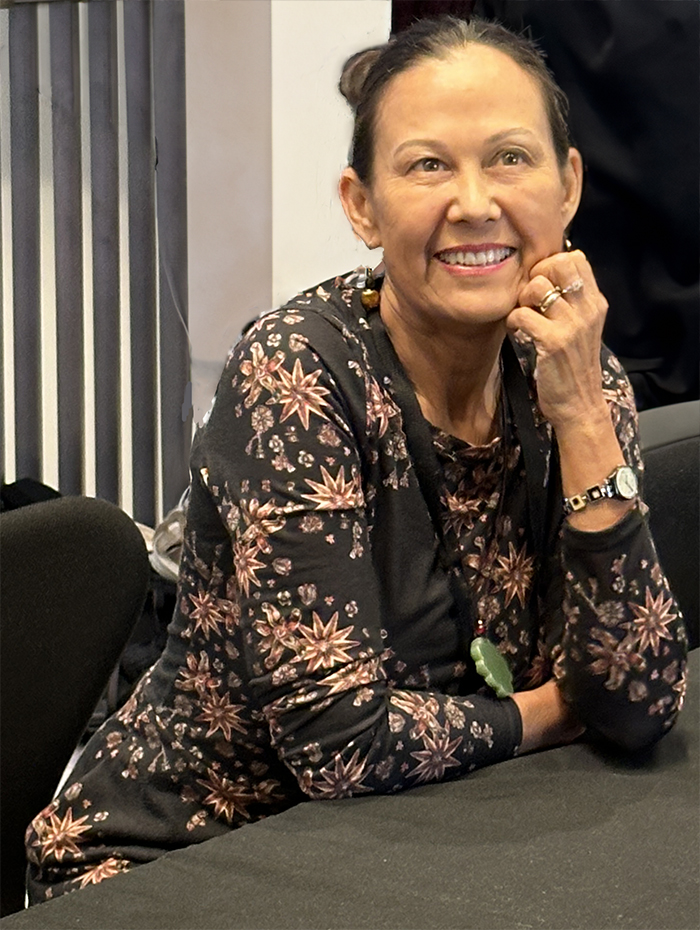
- Born: 1965 (age 60–61); Putāruru, New Zealand
- Occupations: Author; editor
- Notable work: Taine McKenna Adventures Series
- Awards: Bram Stoker Award for Anthology; Sir Julius Vogel Award

Lee Wei-Hahn Murray ONZM (born 1965) is a New Zealand science fiction, fantasy, and horror writer and editor. She is a third generation Chinese New Zealander who has written over forty works. She is a five-time winner of the Bram Stoker Award and a twelve-time winner of the Sir Julius Vogel Award. She is most noted for her Taine McKenna military thrillers, and supernatural crime-noir series The Path of Ra. In December 2024, Murray was appointed an Officer of the New Zealand Order of Merit, for services to literature, particularly speculative literature.

== Biography ==
Murray was born in Putāruru. She previously worked as a scientist and an advisor for the OECD. She is the co-founder of Young New Zealand Writers with Piper Mejia, an organization which has provided development and publishing opportunities for New Zealand school students. She has anxiety and depression. She currently lives in Tauranga.

== Honours and awards ==
Murray's anthologies Hellhole: An Anthology of Subterranean Terror and Black Cranes: Tales of Unquiet Women won the Bram Stoker Award for Anthology in 2018 and 2020 respectively, while her collection Grotesque: Monster Stories won the Fiction Collection category in 2020. Other works have won the Australian Shadows and Sir Julius Vogel awards. She was the winner of the 2019 Bram Stoker Mentor of the year award. She is a professional member of the Horror Writers Association, Australian Horror Writers Association, and the New Zealand Society of Authors. In 2020 she was awarded the New Zealand Society of Authors Honorary Literary Fellowship. In 2021 she was awarded the Grimshaw Sargeson 2021 Fellowship. She won the NZSA Laura Solomon Cuba Press Prize 2023 with her manuscript Fox Spirit on a Distant Cloud.

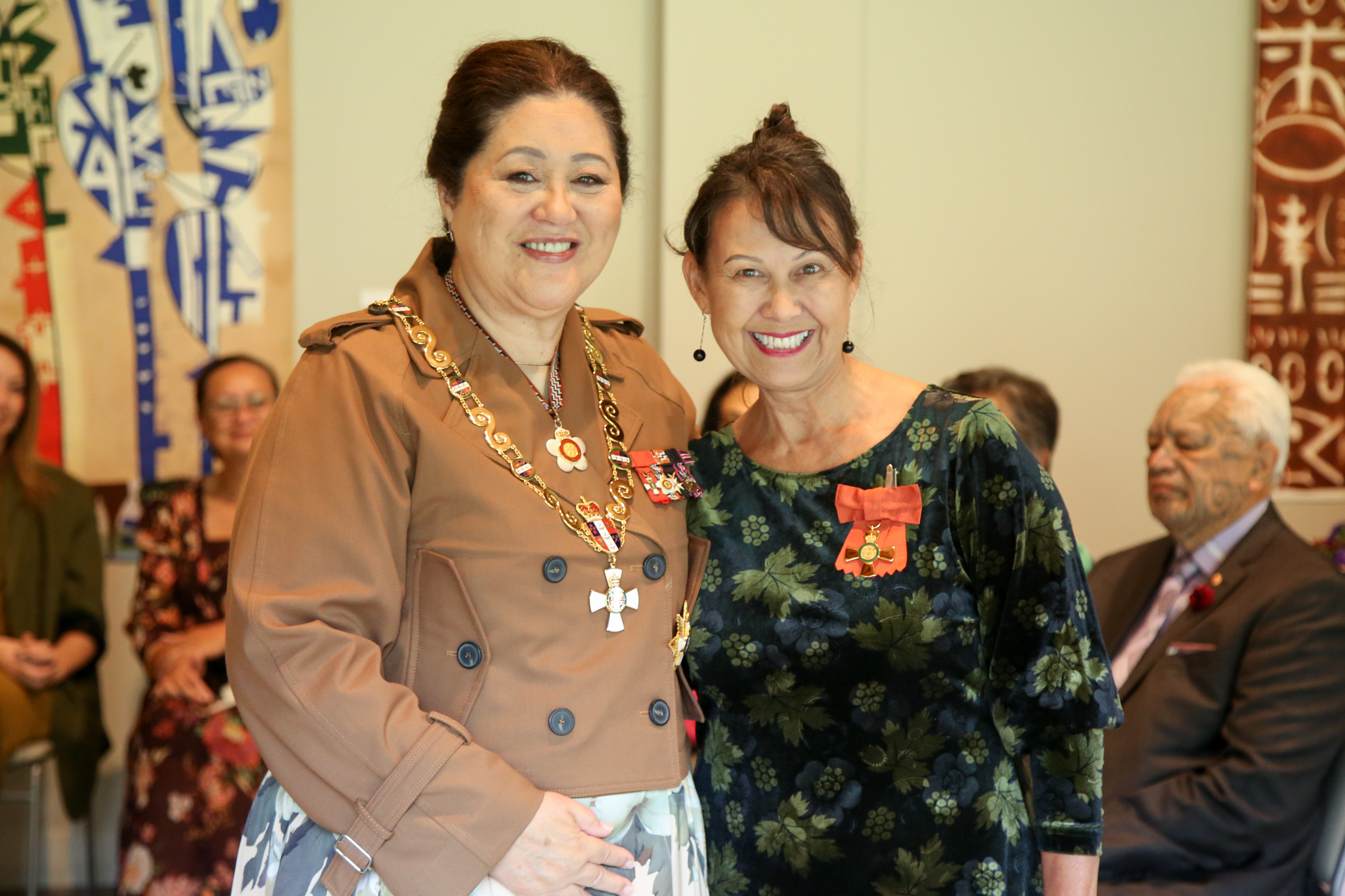
Murray (right), after her investiture as an Officer of the New Zealand Order of Merit by the governor-general, Dame Cindy Kiro, at Government House, Auckland, on 23 May 2025

In the 2025 New Year Honours, Murray was appointed an Officer of the New Zealand Order of Merit, for services to literature, particularly speculative literature.

=== Works as author ===
Year	Title	Award	Category	Result	Ref.
2012	Battle of the Birds	Sir Julius Vogel Award	Youth Novel	Winner	
2013	"Hope is the thing with feathers"	Sir Julius Vogel Award	Short Story	Winner	
2014	Cave Fever	Sir Julius Vogel Award	Novella	Winner	
2015	"Inside Ferndale"	Sir Julius Vogel Award	Short Story	Winner	
2016	"The Thief's Tale"	Sir Julius Vogel Award	Short Story	Winner	
2017	Into the Mist	Sir Julius Vogel Award	Novel	Winner	
2017	—	Sir Julius Vogel Award	Services to Science Fiction, Fantasy and Horror	Winner	
2018	"Dead End Town"	Bram Stoker Award	Short Fiction	Nominee	
2018	Hounds of the Underworld	Sir Julius Vogel Award	Novel	Winner	
2019	Into the Ashes	Bram Stoker Award	Novel	Nominee	
2019	Into the Sounds	Sir Julius Vogel Award	Novel	Winner	
2020	Grotesque: Monster Stories	Bram Stoker Award	Fiction Collection	Winner	
2021	Permanent Damage	Bram Stoker Award	Short Fiction	Winner	
2021	Tortured Willows	Bram Stoker Award	Poetry Collection	Winner	
2022	I Don't Read Horror (& Other Weird Tales)	Bram Stoker Award	Short Non-Fiction	Winner	
2023	Despatches	Bram Stoker Award	Long Fiction	Nominee	

=== Works as editor ===
Year	Title	Award	Category	Result	Ref.
2014	Baby Teeth: Bite-sized Tales of Terror	Sir Julius Vogel Award	Collected Work	Winner	
2017	At the Edge	Sir Julius Vogel Award	Collected Work	Winner	
2018	Hellhole: An Anthology of Subterranean Terror	Australian Shadow	Edited Work	Winner	
2018	Hellhole: An Anthology of Subterranean Terror	Bram Stoker Award	Anthology	Nominee	
2020	Black Cranes: Tales of Unquiet Women	Aurealis	Anthology	Nominee	
2020	Black Cranes: Tales of Unquiet Women	Bram Stoker Award	Anthology	Winner	
2020	Midnight Echo #15	Australian Shadow	Edited Work	Winner	

== Bibliography ==
=== Taine McKenna Adventures ===
1. Into the Mist (2017)
2. Into the Sounds (2018)
3. Into the Ashes (2019)

=== Standalone novels ===
- Misplaced (2013)

=== Collections ===
- Beyond This Story (2014)
- Grotesque: Monster Stories (2020)

=== Edited works ===
- At the Edge (2017)
- Hellhole: An Anthology of Subterranean Terror (2017)
- Black Cranes: Tales of Unquiet Women (2
- Midnight Echo #15 (2020)
- Asian Ghost Short Stories (2022)
- Unquiet Spirits: Essays by Asian Women in Horror (2023)

=== Contributions to anthologies ===
Selected Stories
Year	Title	Anthology
2016		The Refuge Collection Book 1: Heaven to Some
2018		Beneath the Waves: Tales from the Deep (4)
2019		HWA Poetry Showcase Volume VI
