= Nick D. Kim =

New Zealand chemist and cartoonist

Nicholas D. Kim is a New Zealand analytical environmental chemist and cartoonist who currently works as a senior lecturer in applied environmental chemistry, School of Public health, College of Health for Massey University in Wellington, New Zealand. As a cartoonist he is known under his pseudonym Nick. He specializes in environmental chemistry and contamination issues and is certified to practice as an independent hearings commissioner under New Zealand's Resource Management Act. Previously he has acted as a science advisor for the Waikato Regional Council and as a senior lecturer in chemistry at the University of Waikato.

== Biography ==
Kim completed a BSc(Hons) in 1987 and PhD in 1990 at the University of Canterbury in New Zealand, followed by postdoctoral research at the Australian National University. From 1991 to 2001, Kim worked as a lecturer and senior lecturer in at the University of Waikato in Hamilton, New Zealand, where he developed teaching and research interests in environmental chemistry, analytical chemistry and forensic science. It was during this period that Kim started creating science cartoons, which were initially published on Usenet and subsequently developed to an online archive hosted at Ohio State University, and (in print form) New Zealand Science Monthly.

In the subsequent decade from 2002 to 2011 Kim worked as a scientist at the Waikato Regional Council, specialising in scientific and regulatory aspects of environmental contamination issues, including development of local and national policy documents. In 2012 he returned to an academic position as a senior lecturer in applied environmental chemistry at Massey University in Wellington, where he has remained since. Kim teaches chemistry, toxicology, and environmental monitoring, and coordinates Massey University's undergraduate teaching programme in Environmental Health. Kim is contributing editor of the Annals of Improbable Research.

In 2016, Kim said Housing New Zealand had incorrectly followed Ministry of Health guideline, and called the decision to evict tenants, due to forensic traces of methamphetamine, "overkill". The guidelines, which Kim had peer-reviewed in 2010, was for the presence of chemicals used in the manufacture – not consumption – of meth.

In 2018, he co-authored Mountains to Sea: Solving New Zealand’s Freshwater Crisis, published by Bridget Williams Books.

== Cartoonography ==
Kim's cartoons have appeared on the internet since 1994, and in a wide range of science and other publications, including:

- Annals of Improbable Research
- Waikato Times
- The New Zealand Skeptic (journal of the NZ Skeptics)
- The Analytical Scientist
- Phoenixine
- The Conversation (website) and Conversation (Cartoon)

His cartoons are freely available on his website Science and Ink for any non-profit or educational as well as for some commercial uses.

Over the years Kim has been awarded three (1996, 2002, and 2012) Sir Julius Vogel Awards for ‘best fan artwork’ from the Science Fiction and Fantasy Association of New Zealand.
