= Master of Paxwax =

1986 novel

- Author: Phillip Mann
- Cover artist: Fred Gambino
- Language: English
- Series: Gardener
- Subject: Space opera
- Genre: science-fiction novel
- Publisher: Gollancz, Denoël
- Publication date: 1986-06
- Publication place: United Kingdom
- Pages: 280
- ISBN: 0-575-03807-1
- Followed by: The Fall of the Families

Master of Paxwax is a novel by Phillip Mann published in 1986. Master of Paxwax is a novel in which human empires oppress aliens who plan to take their vengeance using the unwitting assistance of Pawl Paxwax of the galactic Families. The book ran as a serial on Radio New Zealand in the early 2000s

== Plot summary ==
The story of Master of Paxwax, Mann's second book, centers around the life of Pawl Paxwax. Pawl – and his name is significant – is the second son of the Fifth Family in a galaxy-wide empire ruled by Eleven Great Families. These Families have for centuries enslaved non-human life forms by a policy of alien genocide. Now things are changing. Beneath the surface of the seemingly dead world of Sanctum, surviving intelligent aliens are gathering, united in their desire to strike back at the barbarous society that had laid waste their civilisations.

When Pawl's father and brother die in quick succession, Pawl finds himself thrust into a position of supreme power, unaware that the alien races have decided to revolt and intend to use him and his lover, Laurel Beltane, as pawns to defeat the other ruling families. Pawl is a poet, and non-political in nature, but his enmity, once roused, is to be feared. "Wonderfully imaginative" said Locus. "High-class space opera with a welter of convincing aliens," sang White Dwarf.

The sequel, The Fall of the Families, brings this saga to its conclusion.

== Reception ==
Dave Langford reviewed Master of Paxwax for White Dwarf #82, and stated that "high-class space opera with a welter of convincing aliens."

== Reviews ==
- Review by Dan Chow (1986) in Locus, #308 September 1986
- Review by Barbara Davies (1986) in Vector, #134
- Review by Chris Amies (1993) in Vector, #175
