= The Refuge Collection =

'The Refuge Collection, Heaven to Some...' and 'The Refuge Collection, ...Hell to Others!'
- First editions
- The Refuge Collection, Heaven to Some - Hell to Others. Two Printed books. Six volumes of six stories in each volume.
- Edited by: Steve Dillon
- Illustrator: Eric Gross, Chris Roberts, Shane K Ryan, Will Jacques, Simon Sayce, Matty Taylor, Edward Miller, Steve Dillon, Greg Chapman, Brian Craddock
- Country: Australia
- Language: English
- Discipline: Horror, Supernatural Thriller, Dystopian Future, Psychological horror
- Publisher: Oz Horror Con
- Published: 2016 and 2017
- Media type: Hardcover and Softback print, eBook
- Website: http://www.refugecollection.com/

The Refuge Collection is an anthology of inter-related stories by various authors published online from 2015–2016 and in print. The first book, The Refuge Collection, Heaven to Some... (2016) contained the first 18 tales and a poem, and was printed in full colour as both hardback and softcover editions. The second book, The Refuge Collection... Hell to Others! contains the next 18 tales from Refuge and brings the series to a conclusion, it seems.

All these tales are set in a shared-universe environment in the fictional (dystopian) town of Refuge, as conceived in 2015 by British-Australian writer Steve Dillon. Although published in Australia, with a contingent of Australian horror writers and artists, there are contributors from America, Australia, New Zealand, the UK and Europe. Renowned British horror author Ramsey Campbell's short story Again was specially adapted for Refuge and is included in the collection. Campbell is an ardent supporter of the project and the back cover includes a plea from Campbell to support the project.

The Refuge Collection project has raised funds for charities in support of refugees, with all profits going to Sanctuary Australia Foundation and Refugee Action UK.

The stories in the collection are primarily horror/thriller in orientation, with various styles and sub-genres of writing represented. Paul Kane's The PI's Tale is written in a noir-detective thriller style. The stories can mostly be read as standalone, especially the earlier tales, with the notable exception of Dillon's own six-part The Empath's Tale and The Priest's Tale (co-written with David Allen). As a shared world, the characters, events and places are re-used by several of the authors to reveal an overarching plot.

The Refuge Collection explores themes such as corruption, ambition, survival and loss. More importantly, the authors are encouraged to highlight themes central to the plight of refugees: isolation, displacement, confusion, family trauma, upheaval, bigotry, racism, end exclusion.

Dillon has said of the project: "As with any diverse society, our Refugeans have not only brought their beliefs with them, but also their gods, and their demons".

== Main characters ==
- Joe Dolan (empath)
- Frank Dolan (Joe Dolan's brother)
- Mayor Eduardo Emeritas
- Father Millar (aka Vasagnatius, son of Vassago)
- Father Mandy (priest)
- DC Roger Dickson
- DC Dick Garrett
- Sarah van Houden (aka the Angel of Refuge)
- Martin "Bruiser" Hayseed (aka Big Marty)
- Eddie Little (aka Mahmoud El-Amin)
- Edmund DeLaq (attorney)
- Harry (Senior worker in the Refuge Cannery, one of the Marsh-folk)
- Sophia (prostitute and transvestite)
- Darren Marsh (Appears in several stories, it would spoil it to say more)
- Whitney (a thief)
- Shauna Clarke (in hiding from an abusive boyfriend)
- Juniper B. Kalahari (The cruciverbalist and crossword creator at the Refuge Reporter)
- Walter Kadinsky (newspaper photographer at The Refuge Reporter)
- Tolani Adadeyu (Overseas fight manager and slave trader)
- Barbara Anniston ('Just' a housewife...?)
- Albert Anniston (Barbara's abusive husband)
- Tori Orchard (Sarah van Houden's cousin)
- O'Donnelly (owner of The Blue Frog Tavern)
- Pyotr Vasilyev (bodyguard; aka The Vigil)
- Tanner
- Eyob Debela (chief mortician)
- Salty Donnchad (sailor)
- Tino Chatara (warrior)
- Hamilton Utseya (general)
- Tendai (warrior)
- Erik Laframboise
- Skeeter Abacus
- Morris Ash (an assassin)
- Ezriel (a gargoyle)
- Vassago (a demon)
- Tally (a phoenix)
- Klahan (a fighter, keen swimmer and a survivor)
- Fiona (aka Fee Fee L'Amour, Charles's ex-wife)
- Perry Johanssen (A walker)
- Charles (Perry's partner)
- Elspet (Joe Dolan's wife, already kidnapped when the first story opens)
- Amy (Joe Dolan and Elspet's baby)
- Samuel Spencer (street artist)
- Frederick (Roberto's partner)
- Roberto (Frederick's partner)
- Alicia (Roberto and Frederick's neighbour)
- Bryant May (Part-time worker at The Blue Frog Tavern, and a keen walker)
- Daniel Dodd/Mitch Straddler (Two personalities in one head)
- A strange boy, who seems to appear at pivotal moments in Dillon's stories, taking notes, providing advice and, reminiscent of the ghosts in Dickens's 'A Christmas Carol', reveals to Joe Dolan something of Refuge's past, present, and future.

== Settings ==
The stories are primarily set in the fictional town of Refuge, whose street layout and geography somewhat reflects the capital city of Australia, Canberra. Other places that are mentioned or featured are Causeway (a recreational township set atop a tor), the sea of Phantasos, and a stretch of road called The Razorback.

Within the borders of Refuge are notable features such as the woods and the cemetery (where Lover's Grotto is), the Dock areas, where a cruise terminal is based, and the fishing boats that supply the town's largest industry, the Refuge Cannery (owned by an indigenous people who are loosely based on Lovecraft's Deep Ones), the Town Square, the Marsh just outside of the town's borders, the Maze (a tangle of slums), and the Catawampas River. There is also a railway that runs east, through the marshlands, to the Refuge Asylum. Beyond that, the Westward Way (an abandoned stretch of railway) leads out through the countryside to a place called 'The Pool', which is a spa town that was abandoned, according to some, because of fracking. Between Refuge's walls and the tangle of slums known as The Maze, Frank Dolan's canal boat is moored on the Neptune Canal. This, and the fact that Refuge is a coastal town, are clear indicators that Refuge is not based in any Canberra that we might know, but perhaps foreshadows a future Canberra, following rising sea levels and other apocalyptic disasters - earthquakes and tsunamis are hinted at throughout the tales, and the final volume reveals a lot more of Refuge's past, present and potentially doomed future.

Notable streets and roads of Refuge include Redwood Avenue, Juniper Avenue, Acacia Avenue, First Street, Second Street, Third Street and Marsh Street.

Local businesses include the markets and the beast markets, the shopping centre, the Blue Frog Tavern, the Herring Cannery, the Kraken Hotel, the Temple of Bes, the Pool Hall, the Refuge Reporter (the local newspaper) and the Church of St Barnabas. There are of course other businesses and more service-oriented establishments referenced in one or more of the tales, including a police station. a mortuary, the hospital, the undertaker's, the 'Tiny tots' kindergarten, a school, and more.

== Inspiration and themes ==
The stories draw on mythological characters as well as spiritual entities. For example, the sea-goddess Dagon is borrowed from HP Lovecraft’s Cthulhu mythos, and there are subtle references to Clive Barker's universe of the Hellraiser movies, with direct references to the Cenobites, which, it seems, may have been partially responsible for whatever apocalypse has befallen Refuge. The Refuge Collection has rather cleverly adopted (both for its emblem and with explicit references in the stories) a rendition of the Lament Configuration from the Hellraiser movie franchise. This has been adapted by Dillon to incorporate a Cthulhu-like octopus head and eye, and Dillon refers to this as 'The Hellbreed Configuration' puzzle-box. The Hellraiser box's original designer, Simon Sayce, along with Mark Miller (from Clive Barker's Seraphim Films), have both approved the use of the design.

== Contributing writers and artists ==
Artists:

- Will Jacques, Matty Taylor, Steve Dillon, Edward Miller, Brian Craddock, Shane K Ryan, Greg Chapman, Eric Gross, Chris Roberts, Simon Sayce (original design for the Lament Configuration) and Mark Buckle.

Writers:

- ‘The Death of a Cruciverbalist’ - Martin Livings
- ‘The Thief’s Tale’ - Lee Murray (This story won the Sir Julius Vogel award for best short story in 2015)
- ‘The PI’s Tale’ - Paul Kane
- ‘The Ghost in the Water’ and 'The Undertaker's Tale' - Noel Osualdini
- ‘Plato’s Cave’, 'The Black Shuck' and 'Blue Frog Falls' - Brian Craddock
- ‘Again’ - Ramsey Campbell, specially adapted by Dillon (with Campbell's permission) to 'fit in' with Refuge, relocating the story form what was 'The Wirral Way' to Refuge's 'The Westward Way'.
- ‘The Public Menace of Blight’ - Kaaron Warren
- ‘The Lizard & the Maiden’ - Tracie McBride
- ‘Forever Autumn’ - EJ McLaughlin
- ‘The Empath’s Tale, Parts 1-6’, ‘The Wrong Path’, ‘The Fighter’s Tale’, ‘The Housewife’s Tale’, ‘Next Door’s Noisy’, 'Lambskin', 'The Strange Old Man', 'No Refuge for Cat', and ‘The Shiraz Train’ - Steve Dillon
- ‘The Priest’s Tale, Part One’ and 'The Priest's Tale, Part Two' - Steve Dillon and David Allen
- ‘Mother Luna’ - A Poem - Chris McCorkindale
- 'The Watcher's Tale' - Amdi Silvestri
- 'When we Were the Spiders' - Marty Young
- 'The Heart of the Mission' - Matthew R Davis. Nominated for the Australian Shadows Award for the 'Best Long Fiction' category of 2016.
- 'The Refugees' - Mark Allan Gunnells
- The Detective's Tale' - Pete Sutton
- Gerald's Memory House' and 'Old Bones, Young Bones' - Gerry Huntman
- Speak No Evil - Matty Taylor

== Other media ==
The Refuge Collection project uses video content created by contributor Brian Craddock, as well as promotional audio and video by Nexus Concept Studios.

Dillon and contributors Kaaron Warren and Lee Murray were interviewed for the online radio show Chatting With Sherri, which aired on 6 April 2016.

Audio adaptations of some of the stories have been released.

== Reception ==
The response to The Refuge Collection has been favorable, with reviewers stating that by reading the series their love for the short story format is renewed.

The financial aid that the book series has generated for charity has also proven in its favour, with recipient Sanctuary Australia Foundation formally announcing their appreciation for the support that the book series has demonstrated in relocating a refugee family. More than a thousand dollars was raised and donated to Sanctuary Australia by The Refuge Collection, through online sales and auctions.

== Awards ==
Lee Murray's story The Thief's Tale won the Sir Julius Vogel Award for Best Short Story 2015.
