= The Fall of the Families =

1987 novel

The Fall of the Families is a novel by Phillip Mann published in 1987, a sequel of Master of Paxwax from 1986.

== Plot summary ==
The Fall of the Families is a novel in which aliens free themselves from oppressive rule by humans.

== Reception ==
Dave Langford reviewed The Fall of the Families for White Dwarf #92, and stated that "The conclusion is oddly satisfying, but I was dubious about some the psychological manipulations en route."

== Reviews ==
- Review by Dan Chow (1987) in Locus, #316 May 1987
- Review by Barbara Davies (1987) in Vector, #139
- Review by John Clute (1987) in Interzone, #22 Winter 1987
