= Octavia Cade =

New Zealand writer

- Education: University of Otago (PhD, 2015)
- Occupation: Writer
- Writing career
- Genre: Climate fiction
- Notable awards: Robert Burns Fellowship (2025)

Academic background
- Thesis: Communicating Science Through Poetry from 1780 to the Present (2015)
- Doctoral advisor: Lloyd Spencer Davis

Octavia Jane Cade is a New Zealand writer of short climate fiction novels. She held the 2025 Robert Burns Fellowship.

== Life and career ==
Cade holds a master's degree in biology and a PhD in science communication from the University of Otago (completed in 2015).

Cade published two novellas The Ghost of Matter (2016) and The Convergence of Fairy Tales (2017), both of which received the Sir Julius Vogel Award for best novella/novellette.

In 2020 she published the novel The Stone Wētā, a thriller about twelve scientists engaged in the smuggling of climate data. It received the Sir Julius Vogel Award for best novel in 2021.

In 2021 she published the novella The Impossible Resurrection of Grief, about a marine biologist in the future dealing with a dying climate and ecological devastation. It received the 2022 Sir Julius Vogel Award for best novella/novellette. Shana Chandra in Landfall Tauraka described it as a "non-traditional ghost story, one that truly haunts as it is set in a future not so distant from ours, where the destruction of our seas and wildlife has left familiar land- and seascapes drained of life".

Cade has held several writers' residencies. In 2020 she had residencies at the Christchurch Arts Centre and Massey University/Square Edge. In 2021 she held a residency at the Michael King Writers Centre. She was the Ursula Bethell writer-in-residence at the University of Canterbury in 2023, and held the 2025 Robert Burns Fellowship at the University of Otago.

== Selected works ==
- The Ghost of Matter (Paper Road Press, 2016)
- The Convergence of Fairy Tales (The Book Smugglers, 2017)
- The Stone Wētā (Paper Road Press, 2020)
- The Impossible Resurrection of Grief (Stelliform Press, 2021)
