= Russell Kirkpatrick =

New Zealand geography lecturer and writer

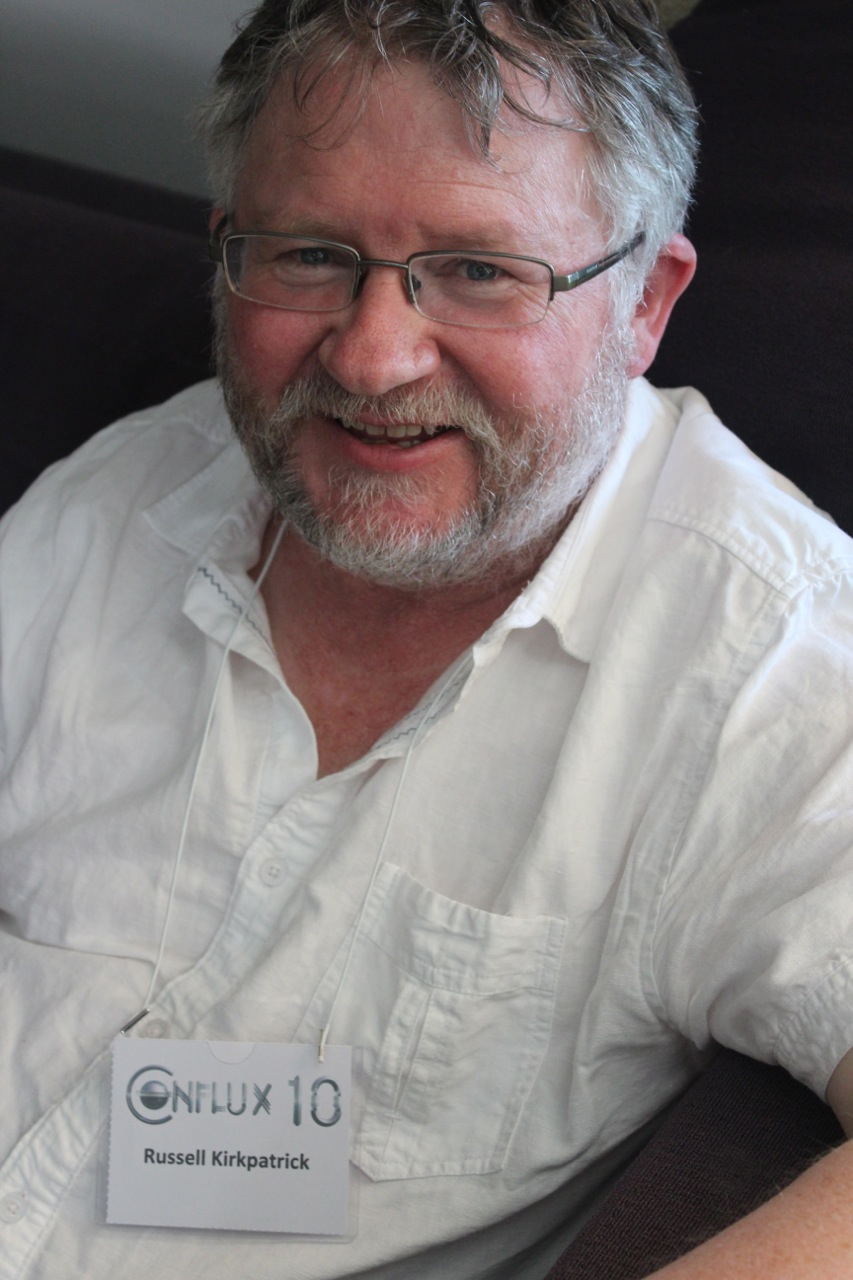
- Kirkpatrick, 2014
- Born: 1961 (age 64–65); Christchurch, New Zealand
- Education: University of Canterbury (PhD)
- Occupations: Novelist; geography lecturer; mapmaker; photographer
- Children: 2
- Writing career
- Genre: Fantasy
- Notable works: Fire of Heaven trilogy; Husk (or Broken Man) trilogy
- Notable awards: Sir Julius Vogel Award (3-time winner)

Russell Kirkpatrick (1961 - 26 June 2026) was a New Zealand novelist, geography lecturer, cartographer and photographer. He contributed to a number of notable atlases, and completed two fantasy trilogies. He was a three-time winner of the award for best novel (adult category) at New Zealand's Sir Julius Vogel Awards. His books were first published in Australia and in the mid-2010s he moved to Canberra, where from 2022 to 2026 he lectured at the University of Canberra.

== Life and career ==
Kirkpatrick was born in Christchurch in 1961, and lived there until 1999, when he and his family moved to Hamilton.

He became interested in maps and mapmaking at primary school, and in the 1990s was noted as having New Zealand's largest collection of Lego. He held a PhD in geography from the University of Canterbury, obtained in 1991, and lectured at the University of Waikato in Hamilton from 2000 until 2014.

Of his passion for maps, Kirkpatrick said:

I'm probably a little more obsessive than most. I have this pet theory that there's a common link between my love of maps and the fact that I'm an obsessive Lego collector, a computer programmer, and a science-fiction fantasy lover.

He worked on a number of atlases, including as deputy editor of the New Zealand Historical Atlas (1998), which won the readers' choice award at the 1998 Montana Book Awards, and as author of the Contemporary Atlas of New Zealand (1999), which had sold more than 20,000 copies as of 2009. His 2000 work Degrees of Deprivation in New Zealand: An Atlas of Socioeconomic Difference was described by Annette King, then the New Zealand Minister of Health, as an "exciting tool" that could be used by the government to ensure health spending was better-targeted. He wrote and provided photographs for a book about New Zealand waterfalls, Walk to Waterfalls (2011). He had said his favourite waterfall in New Zealand is Marokopa Falls.

Kirkpatrick's first novel, Across the Face of the World, was published in Australia in 2004, and was the best-selling fantasy novel in Australia in that year, as well as topping the Dymocks bestseller list for over four weeks. It was followed by two further novels in the Fire of Heaven series. A 2004 review by The New Zealand Herald of Across the Face of the World noted that Kirkpatrick had spent 16 years writing the book, an "investment [which] seems to have paid off" in terms of world-building and the creation of a detailed atlas. The reviewer felt however that despite having "all the key fantasy elements" the book was lacking "enough creative spark to ignite [the reviewer's] imagination". Gerard Campbell for The Press described it as "a solid fantasy world that is worth a look for fans of the genre". In 2008, Across the Face of the World was published in the USA and was the best-selling science fiction or fantasy debut in that year.

Each of the three novels of Kirkpatrick's Husk trilogy won the award for best novel (adult category) at the Sir Julius Vogel Awards: Path of Revenge in 2008, Dark Heart in 2009, and Beyond the Wall of Time in 2010. Jason Nahrung, reviewing Path of Revenge for The Courier-Mail, noted the praise Kirkpatrick has received for his mapmaking, and said he "has managed to not only paint a working, believable world in this, the first of a new series, but inhabit it with real people as well". Kirkpatrick described his second trilogy as darker than the first, noting that at the time of writing the first he was training to be a pastor.

Silent Sorrow (2020), the first novel in his planned The Book of Remezov trilogy, was shortlisted for the best novel award at the 2022 Sir Julius Vogel Awards.

As of 2020 he was based in Canberra, Australia, and working as a sessional lecturer at the University of Canberra.

Russell Kirkpatrick died of complications from melanoma on 26 June 2026. A memorial service was held at the Margaret Whitlam Pavilion, National Arboretum Canberra, on 2 August 2026.

== Selected works ==
=== Fire of Heaven trilogy ===
- Across the Face of the World (2004)
- In the Earth Abides the Flame (2005)
- The Right Hand of God (2006)

=== Husk or Broken Man trilogy ===
The Husk trilogy was published as the Broken Man trilogy in the United States and United Kingdom.

- Path of Revenge (2006)
- Dark Heart (2008)
- Beyond the Wall of Time (2009)

=== The Book of Remezov trilogy ===
- Silent Sorrow (2020)

=== Non-fiction ===
- New Zealand Historical Atlas (1998, deputy editor, with editor Malcolm McKinnon)
- Degrees of Deprivation in New Zealand: An Atlas of Socioeconomic Difference (2000)
- Contemporary Atlas of New Zealand (1999, 2nd edition 2004, author)
- Rural Canterbury, Celebrating its History (2001, co-editor with Garth Cant)
- Walk to Waterfalls (2011, author and photographer)
