= Peter Friend (author) =

New Zealand born science fictionwriter

Peter Friend is a New Zealand born science fiction writer who won the Sir Julius Vogel Award for fiction three times. His stories have been published in Asimov's Science Fiction, Aurealis, Andromeda Spaceways Inflight Magazine and elsewhere.

The stories he has won awards for are:

- "The Good Earth" (2002 Sir Julius Vogel Award)
- "The Alchemist" - Andromeda Spaceways Inflight Magazine #8 which tied for first with “A Plea for Help” - by Kevin G Maclean (2004 Sir Julius Vogel Award)
- "The Real Deal" published in Asimov's Science Fiction Magazine, July 2005 (2006 Sir Julius Vogel Award)
- He also had a story shortlisted for the 2005 Sir Julius Vogel Award: "The Christmas Tree" - published in Asimov’s Science Fiction Magazine

== Short films ==
Peter has also won both the Hobbyist Category and Overall prizes at the 2007 Moviefest short film competition, for a 5-minute animated film entitled 'Monocular'.
