= Science Fiction and Fantasy Association of New Zealand =

New Zealand organisation for fan activities

The Science Fiction and Fantasy Association of New Zealand is a non-profit organisation founded in 2002 which aims to coordinate and facilitate science fiction and fantasy-related fan activities within New Zealand. Being an umbrella organisation rather than being affiliated to any club or clubs, it hopes to remain free of the factional problems which beset its predecessor, the National Association for Science Fiction.

The organisation runs the national science fiction awards (the Sir Julius Vogel Awards) in coordination with the organising committees of the annual national conventions. As national conventions in New Zealand are run on a year-by-year basis by different organising groups, SFFANZ provides continuity between these committees and is also able to provide legal and financial assistance that would be unavailable to a short-term committee organisation.
