= Aotearapa =

New Zealand-based press association

- Founded: 1979
- Founder: Greg Hills
- Type: Amateur press association
- Legal status: Inactive
- Purpose: Science fiction fandom
- Region served: New Zealand

Aotearapa was a New Zealand-based amateur press association, run in association with New Zealand science fiction fandom. It caters primarily - but not exclusively - to science fiction fans. Founded by Greg Hills in 1979, it is New Zealand's only apa, and that country's longest-running science fiction-related publication. Members have mostly been from New Zealand, although there have been members in the United States, Australia, and the United Kingdom.

Published bi-monthly, Aotearapa had its heyday in the early 1990s, at which time it would often exceed 180 pages. In decline in recent years, Aotearapa ran for 167 issues before going into hiatus in July 2007.

In January 2008 Aotearapa mailing 168 re-emerged in different format, with bi-monthly electronic mailings of pdf and text files replacing the traditional paper and postage format. This format lasted only a few months.

== Editors ==
- 1979-1980: Greg Hills
- 1980-1983: Tom Cardy
- 1984-1985: Julie Stigter
- 1986-1987: Dan McCarthy
- 1988-1990: Keith Smith
- 1990-1993: James Dignan
- 1993-1995: Murray MacLachlan
- 1995-1997: Tim Jones
- 1997-2001: Simon Greenfield
- 2001-2003: Dan McCarthy
- 2003-2007: Nicholas Smeaton
- 2008- : Rex Thompson
