= Phillip Mann =

British science fiction writer in New Zealand (1942–2022)

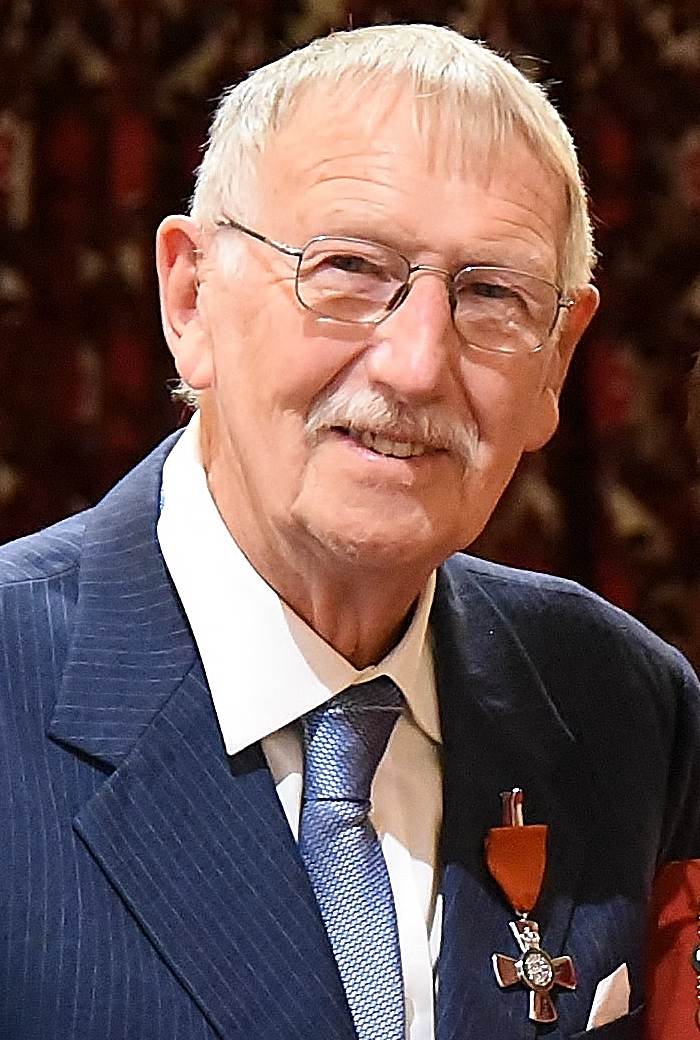
Mann in 2017

Anthony Phillip Mann MNZM (August 1942 – 1 September 2022) was a British-born New Zealand science fiction author. He studied English and drama at Manchester University and later in California before moving to New Zealand where he established the first drama studies position at a New Zealand university in 1970; at the Victoria University of Wellington in Wellington. He retired from the position of professor of drama at Victoria in 1998 to concentrate on other projects.

== Biography ==
Mann worked extensively in theatre, as a professional director and drama tutor, both in New Zealand, the United States and Europe.

Between 1968 and 1970, he worked as a 'polisher of English' (i.e. sub-editor) with the New China News Agency in Beijing. This being the period shortly after the conclusion of the Cultural Revolution, he was able to witness the re-emergence of Classical Chinese theatre as well as the emergence of new forms of drama. It was during this period that he wrote his first science fiction novel, The Eye of the Queen. For further details concerning this book and the circumstances surrounding its composition, visit Phillip Mann's website; see external links below.

The Eye of the Queen details the life of Marius Thorndyke, Earth's leading contact linguist and founder of the CLI (Contact Linguistics Institute) after he departs to the world called Pe-Ellia at the invitation of the species for whom that is their home world. This species, long suspected but hitherto unknown, have been responsible for restricting Earth's space exploration to just a few inhabited planets none of which have attained space travel. In the course of his visit, Thorndyke comes to identify emotionally with one of the Pe-Ellian inhabitants and seeks to 'meld' with that being. This has extraordinary consequences for both Earth and Pe-Ellia.

The Eye of the Queen established Phillip Mann's reputation as a creator of 'credible aliens' – a feature which remained prominent in his later works. He commented, "Thinking about alien consciousness helps clarify my thinking about Earth and the way we conduct ourselves. Thus I think of my books as being about us, no matter how outlandish the scenario." The novel met with such critical success that some felt he would not be able to equal it. However, Master of Paxwax and its sequel, Fall of the Families, have become classics of New Zealand literature. Both books have been recorded in 15-minute episodes read by Dick Weir. They are regularly broadcast on Radio New Zealand. CDs of these recordings are available from Radio New Zealand.

The story of Master of Paxwax, Mann's second book, centers around the life of Pawl Paxwax. Pawl – and his name is significant – is the second son of the Fifth Family in a galaxy-wide empire ruled by Eleven Great Families. These Families have for centuries enslaved non-human life forms by a policy of alien genocide. Now things are changing. Beneath the surface of the seemingly dead world of Sanctum, surviving intelligent aliens are gathering, united in their desire to strike back at the barbarous society that had laid waste their civilisations.

When Pawl's father and brother die in quick succession, Pawl finds himself thrust into a position of supreme power, unaware that the alien races have decided to revolt and intend to use him and his lover, Laurel Beltane, as pawns to defeat the other ruling families. Pawl is a poet, and non-political in nature, but his enmity, once roused, is to be feared. "Wonderfully imaginative" said Locus. "High-class space opera with a welter of convincing aliens," sang White Dwarf.

The sequel, fittingly titled The Fall of the Families, brings this saga to its conclusion.

The Encyclopedia of Science Fiction describes Phillip Mann's fiction as possessing "a strong visual and structural sense". In 2010 he was awarded a Sir Julius Vogel Award (New Zealand's top science fiction and fantasy award) for "Services to Science Fiction, Fantasy and Horror".

After a decade concentrating on theatre direction, travelling, living in France and writing some plays and children's literature, in 2013 he published his first novel since 1996, The Disestablishment of Paradise. This is about the corruption by mankind of a pristine Earth-like planet called Paradise and subsequent banishment.

In the 2017 New Year Honours, Mann was appointed a Member of the New Zealand Order of Merit, for services to literature and drama.

Mann divided his time between his home in Brooklyn, Wellington and a converted barn in the small town of Choussy in France's Loire Valley. He was working on a new novel The Headman (a "darkly comic novel"), an anthology of short stories, and a work on theatre production.

Mann died in Wellington on September 1, 2022, at the age of 80.

== Bibliography ==
=== Novels ===
- The Eye of the Queen. London: Gollancz, 1982. ISBN 0-575-03106-9
- The Story of the Gardener
  - Master of Paxwax. London: Gollancz, 1986. ISBN 0-575-03807-1
  - The Fall of the Families. London: Gollancz, 1987. ISBN 0-575-03808-X
- Pioneers. London: Gollancz, 1986. ISBN 0-575-04281-8
- Wulfsyarn – A Mosaic. London: Gollancz, 1988. ISBN 0-575-05162-0
- A Land Fit for Heroes
  - Escape to the Wild Wood. London: Gollancz, 1993. ISBN 0-575-05515-4
  - Stand Alone Stan. London: Gollancz, 1994. ISBN 0-575-05516-2
  - The Dragon Wakes. London: Gollancz, 1995. ISBN 0-575-06009-3
  - The Burning Forest. London: Gollancz, 1996. ISBN 0-575-06152-9
- The Disestablishment of Paradise. London: Gollancz, 2013. ISBN 978-0-575-13263-4
- The Paradise Mission. This is a version of The Disestablishment of Paradise edited for younger readers 10 – 15. It is due to be released as an E book on SF Gateway in 2014.
- Chevalier & Gawayn: The Ballad of the Dreamer, Quentin Wilson Publishing, 2022. ISBN 9781991103086

=== Collections ===
- A collection of short stories for adult readers is also in preparation for release on SF Gateway in 2014.
- Tales from the Borderland. 10 linked stories for children with text, music and CD of readings. (In preparation.)
- Three Plays by the New Zealand playwright Robert Lord. Published with extensive notes and introduction, by Playmarket NZ October 2013. This volume makes available for the first time full texts of Lord's first play, It Isn't Cricket; Well Hung, a popular comedy concerning the New Zealand Police force; and hitherto unpublished, The Travelling Squirrel, completed shortly before Lord's death in 1992.

CD copies of readings of The Master of Paxwax and The Fall of the Families have been issued by Radio New Zealand in 2010. 2012, Radio New Zealand broadcast a serialised version of Wulfsyarn – A Mosaic.
