= Nalini Singh (author) =

New Zealand writer (born 1977)

Nalini Raadhika Singh
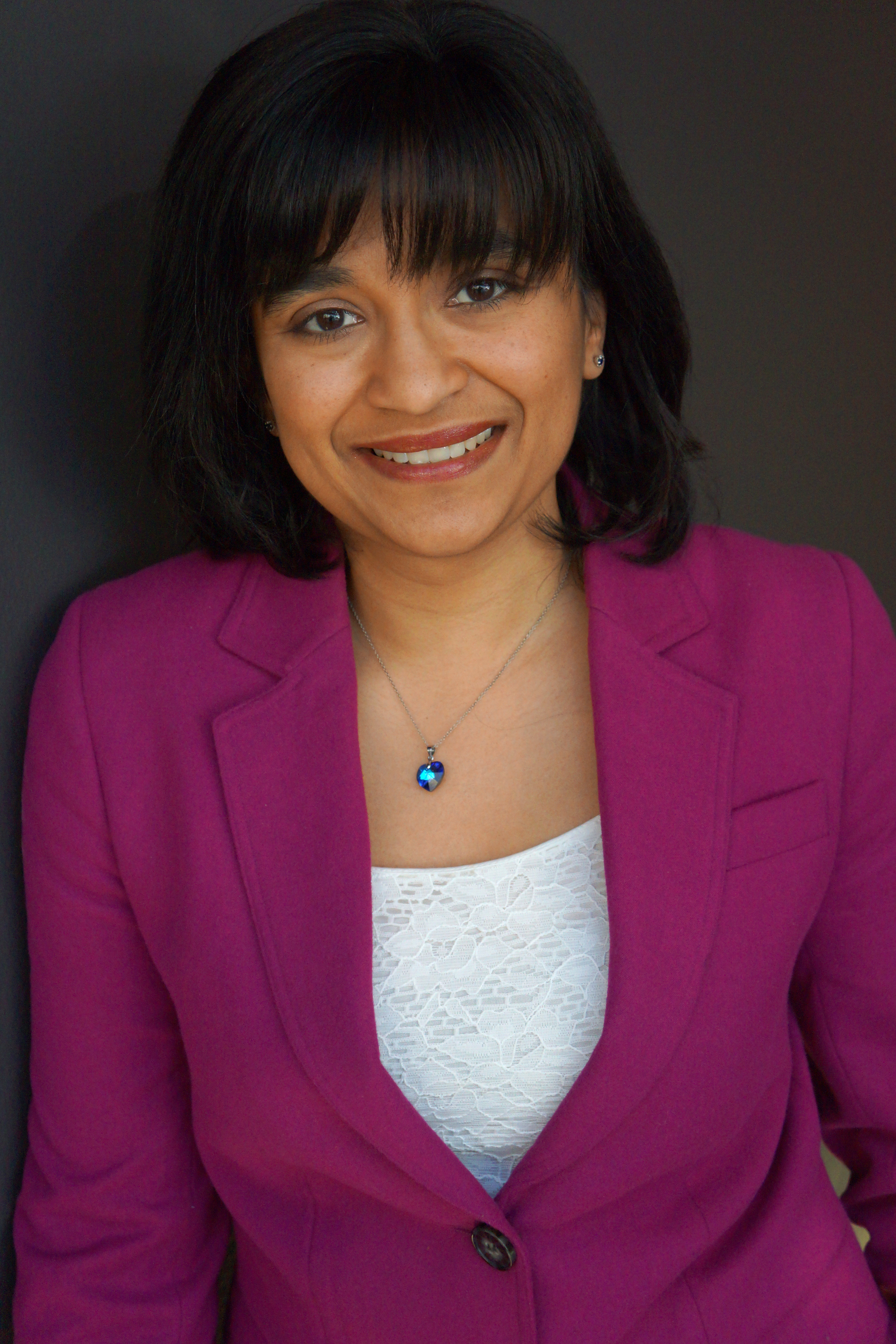
- At the 2012 Frankfurt Book Fair
- Born: 7 September 1977 (age 49); Suva, Fiji
- Citizenship: New Zealand
- Education: Bachelor of Laws (hons) (conj) 2001
- Alma mater: University of Auckland
- Occupation: Author
- Writing career
- Language: English
- Years active: 1999–
- Genres: Paranormal romance Science fiction Fantasy; Romance; Thriller
- Notable awards: Clendon Award (readers' choice), 2001; Sir Julius Vogel Award (best novella/novelette), 2008 & 2009; Australian Romance Readers Awards (favourite paranormal romance), 2020
- Website: nalinisingh.com

Nalini Singh (born 1977) is a New Zealand author of Indo-Fijian descent. She has authored numerous paranormal romance novels.

== Early life ==
Of Indian descent, Nalini Singh was born in 1977 in Suva, Fiji, and moved to Auckland, New Zealand when she was 10. She attended Mount Roskill Grammar School, then studied Law and English Literature at the University of Auckland, and worked as a law clerk after graduating LLB (conjoint) with honours in 2001.

== Writing ==
In 1999, Singh placed third in the Romance Writers of New Zealand's Clendon Award competition. In 2001 her manuscript "Coaxing the Sheik" won the Jane Porter Award for highest-placed Mills and Boon, as well as the Clendon Award's Readers' Choice Award. "Coaxing the Sheik" went on to be her first published work, published under the title Desert Warrior through the imprint Silhouette Desire in 2003.

Her books have appeared on the New York Times best-sellers list, the USA Today best-sellers list, and the Publishers Weekly best-sellers list.

She has won the Sir Julius Vogel Award for best novella/novelette (twice, in 2008 and 2009). Alpha Night won the Favourite Paranormal Romance at the 2020 Australian Romance Readers Awards. Her 2021 crime novel, Quiet in Her Bones, was a finalist for the Best Crime Novel at the 2022 Ngaio Marsh Awards.

The Guild Hunter series, which began with Angels' Blood in 2005, will conclude with Archangel's Eternity, set to be published May 2026.

Despite living in Auckland, New Zealand, Singh has been described as "the most famous author that New Zealanders had never heard of."

== Bibliography ==
Singh has had over three dozen novels published. She has also self-published several short stories.

=== Psy-Changeling series ===
==== Initial series ====
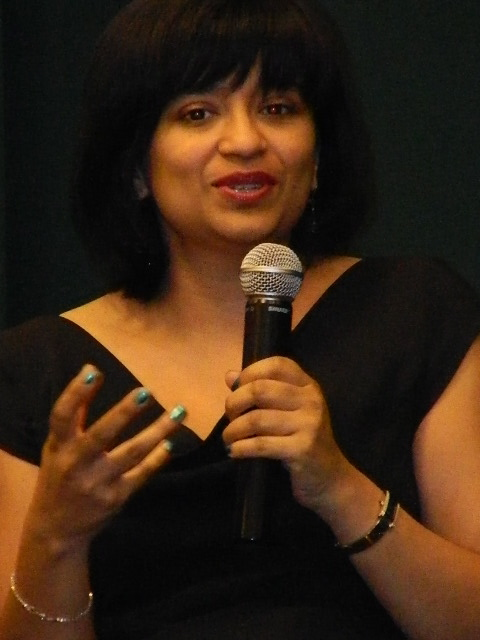
Nalini Singh discusses Heart of Obsidian in New York.

- Slave to Sensation (Sept 2006) ISBN 978-0-425-21286-8
- Visions of Heat (March 2007) ISBN 978-0-425-21575-3
- Caressed by Ice (Sept 2007) ISBN 978-0-425-21842-6
- Mine to Possess (Feb 2008) ISBN 978-0-425-22016-0
- Hostage to Pleasure (Sept 2008) ISBN 978-0-425-22325-3
- Branded by Fire (July 2009) ISBN 978-0-425-22673-5
- Blaze of Memory (Nov 2009) ISBN 978-0-425-23544-7
- Bonds of Justice (July 2010) ISBN 978-0-425-23544-7
- Play of Passion (Nov 2010) ISBN 978-0-425-23779-3
- Kiss of Snow (May 2011) ISBN 978-0-425-24209-4, ISBN 978-0-425-24489-0
- Tangle of Need (May 2012) ISBN 978-0-425-24756-3, ISBN 978-0-425-25109-6
- Heart of Obsidian (June 2013) ISBN 978-0-425-26399-0, ISBN 978-0-425-26400-3
- Shield of Winter (June 2014) ISBN 978-0-425-26401-0, ISBN 978-0-425-26402-7
- Shards of Hope (June 2015) ISBN 978-0-425-26403-4, ISBN 978-0-425-26404-1
- Allegiance of Honor (June 2016) ISBN 978-0-425-26403-4, ISBN 978-0-425-26404-1

==== Trinity series ====
- Silver Silence (June 2017) ISBN 978-1-101-98779-7, ISBN 978-1-101-98780-3
- Ocean Light (June 2018) ISBN 978-1-101-98782-7
- Wolf Rain (June 2019) ISBN 978-1-9848-0359-7
- Alpha Night (June 2020) ISBN 978-1-9848-0364-1
- Last Guard (July 2021) ISBN 978-1-9848-0365-8
- Storm Echo (Aug 2022) ISBN 978-0-593-44067-4
- Resonance Surge (July 2023) ISBN 978-0-593-44071-1
- Primal Mirror (July 2024) ISBN 978-0-593-44073-5
- Atonement Sky (July 2025) ISBN 978-0-593-81952-4

=== Guild Hunter series ===
==== Novels ====
- Angel's Blood (May 2009) ISBN 978-0-425-22692-6
- Archangel's Kiss (Feb 2010) ISBN 978-0-425-23336-8
- Archangel's Consort (Jan 2011) ISBN 978-0-425-24013-7
- Archangel's Blade (Sept 2011) ISBN 978-0-425-24391-6
- Archangel's Storm (Sept 2012) ISBN 978-0-425-24658-0
- Archangel's Legion (Oct 2013) ISBN 978-0-425-25124-9
- Archangel's Shadows (Oct 2014) ISBN 978-0-425-25117-1
- Archangel's Enigma (Sept 2015) ISBN 978-0-425-25126-3
- Archangel's Heart (Nov 2016) ISBN 978-0-451-48800-8
- Archangel's Viper (Sept 2017) ISBN 978-0-451-48824-4
- Archangel's Prophecy (Oct 2018) ISBN 978-0-451-49164-0
- Archangel's War (Sept 2019) ISBN 978-0-451-49166-4
- Archangel's Sun (Nov 2020) ISBN 978-0-593-19813-1
- Archangel's Light (Oct 2021) ISBN 978-0-593-19814-8
- Archangel's Resurrection (Oct 2022) ISBN 978-1-4732-3149-8
- Archangel's Lineage (April 2024) ISBN 978-0-593-55001-4
- Archangel's Ascension (May 2025) ISBN 978-0-593-55003-8

=== Rock Kiss series ===
==== Novels ====
- Rock Addiction (Sept 2014)
- Rock Courtship (June 2015)
- Rock Hard (March 2015)
- Rock Redemption (Oct 2015)
- Rock Wedding (July 2016)

=== Hard Play series ===
- Cherish Hard (2017)
- Rebel Hard (2018)
- Love Hard (2021)
- Kiss Hard (2022)

=== Other books ===
- Lord of the Abyss (2011) (part of Royal House of Shadows series) ISBN 978-0-373-61872-9

==== Standalone ====
- A Madness of Sunshine (December 2019) ISBN 978-0-593-09913-1
- Quiet in Her Bones (Feb 2021) ISBN 147322957X, 978-1473229570
- There Should Have Been Eight (Nov 2023) ISBN 9780593549766
- Such a Perfect Family (Jan 2026) ISBN 9780593549797

==== Silhouette Desire ====
- Desert Warrior (Aug 2003) ISBN 978-0-373-76529-4
- Awaken to Pleasure (Aug 2004) ISBN 978-0-373-76602-4
- Awaken the Senses (May 2005) ISBN 978-0-373-76651-2, ISBN 978-0-373-76651-2
- Craving Beauty (July 2005) ISBN 978-0-373-76667-3 (formerly: Marriage at First Sight)
- Marriage Bed Secrets (March 2006) ISBN 978-0-373-76716-8 (formerly: Secrets in the Marriage Bed)
- To Have and to Hold (Feb 2007) ISBN 978-0-373-76781-6 (formerly: Bound by Marriage)

=== Anthologies and collections ===
Anthology or Collection	Contents	Publication Date	Publisher	ISBN	Comments
An Enchanted Season	Beat of Temptation	2007		ISBN 9780425217856	Psy-Changeling Series
The Magical Christmas Cat	Stroke of Enticement	2008		ISBN 9781440656835 ISBN 9781440656873	Psy-Changeling Series
Must Love Hellhounds	Angels' Judgment	2009		ISBN 9781101139165 ISBN 9781101140079	Guild Hunter Series
Burning Up	Whisper of Sin	2010	Berkley		Psy-Changeling Series e-book
Paranormal Holiday Anthology Trio	Beat of Temptation Stroke of Enticement	2010	Berkley	ISBN 9781101497005	Psy-Changeling Series e-book
Angel of Darkness	Angel's Wolf	2011		ISBN 9781101542026 ISBN 9781101544907 ISBN 978-0-425-24312-1	Guild Hunter Series
Guild Hunter Novels 1-4	Angel's Blood Archangel's Kiss Archangel's Consort Archangel's Blade	2012		ISBN 9781101579053	Guild Hunter Series
Angels' Flight	Angels' Wolf Angels' Judgement Angels' Pawn Angels' Dance	Feb 2012		ISBN 1101560398, 9781101560396	Guild Hunter Novellas
Wild Invitation	Beat of Temptation Stroke of Enticement Declaration of Courtship Texture of Intimacy	Mar 2013		ISBN 978-0-425-25513-1	Psy-Changeling Novellas
Wide Awake	Awaken To Pleasure Awaken The Senses Craving Beauty	Feb 2014	Mills & Boon	ISBN 9781488704628	Silhouette Desire
Night Shift	Secrets at Midnight	2014		ISBN 9780698154049	Psy-Changeling Series e-book
Wild Embrace	Echo of Silence Dorian Partners in Persuasion Flirtation of Fate	Aug 2016			Psy-Changeling Novellas
Newsletter Exclusives: Volume 1	Dancing with Cooper Poker Night Song of the Wolf Rowan Knives and Sheaths An Unexpected Guest Music Awards (Molly, Fox, others) David's Memo to Thea (Thea, David) Thea's Reply (David, Thea) With This Memo (the main characters) Sunshine (the main characters)	Dec 2017	Self-Published		Psy-Changeling Series Guild Hunter Series Rock Kiss Series

== Other work ==
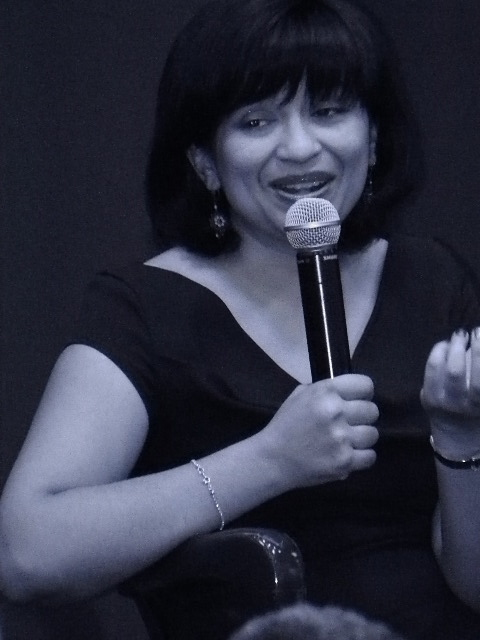
Singh engaging audience at book signing in New York.

Singh spent three years working in Japan as an English teacher and touring other parts of Asia. At other times she has also worked as a lawyer, a librarian, a candy factory general hand, and a bank temp, but "not necessarily in that order".
