= Lyn McConchie =

New Zealand speculative fiction writer (born 1946)

Lyn McConchie (born 1946) is a New Zealand writer of speculative fiction (science fiction, fantasy, and horror fiction), picture books for children, a nonfiction humour series, a number of standalone books and many short stories, articles, poems, opinion pieces, and reviews.

== Biography ==
McConchie was born in Auckland, New Zealand, and attended Freyberg High School in Roslyn. She was crippled in a motorcycle accident in 1977. McConchie has worked in the Justice Department and the Office of Agriculture and Fisheries in Wellington before she began writing professionally in 1990. Since that time she has sold on average one book every eight months. Her first book to appear was Farming Daze, containing humorous true-life stories about her farm and animals. That first book is still in print, with six more since published in that series. In addition to three Vogel Award-winning collaborations, McConchie wrote three sequels in the Beast Master series that Andre Norton inaugurated in 1959 and four novels in the Witch World universe that Norton created in 1963. McConchie's work has appeared in nine countries to date, and in four languages. Her list of published books stands at 43; she has also published novellas; and her short story list recently passed 300. McConchie also writes consumer/recycling articles for her local newspaper, and speciality articles for magazines in New Zealand and the UK. She has written under the pseudonyms of Jan Bishop and Elizabeth Underwood. She writes from her home, Farside Farm, on the north island of New Zealand.

== Awards ==
McConchie has won the Best Novel category in the Sir Julius Vogel Awards for New Zealand science fiction and fantasy six times, including three for novels set in Andre Norton's worlds (by Norton and McConchie): in 2003, 2005, and 2006 for Beastmaster's Ark, Beastmaster's Circus, and The Duke's Ballad. At the 2011 Vogels, McConchie won both the Best Novel category with The Questing Road and the Best Young Adult Novel category with Summer of Dreaming. In 2013 she won Best Novel again for her collaborated book 'Queen of Iron Years (with Sharman Horwood) Lyn's SF novel, Vestiges of Flames, was a Sir Julius Vogel award nominee in 2016. Most recently her Ancient Egypt alternate history fantasy, Bastet's Daughters, received the International Cat Writers Assn. Certificate of Excellence in March 2018.

She also won an award for editing in the Vogels' former incarnation as the New Zealand science fiction fan awards in 1990. Her short stories have won The Australian SF Foundation award (for The Third Storey) in 1992, and Muse Medallions (Best Short Story) from the international Cat Writers Association in 1996, 1997, 1998, 1999, and 2002. In 2011 her short story, Opener of Doors won a 6th Certificate of Excellence and Muse Medallion. Her short story, Waiting Tables and Time, was a finalist in the Sir Julius Vogel awards (Best Short Story) in 2009, and a Gaylactic Awards shortlister for 2011. In October 2012 her short story, The Domen, (Penumbra eZine May issue) won the international Cat Writers' Association (CWA) Certificate of Excellence, and continued on to win their 2012 Muse Medallion for this work.

== Recent works ==
=== Nonfiction works ===
- The book Where There's Smoke: The Fire That Changed the Law, co-written with her long-time friend Linnette Horne, appeared in March 2012 from Heritage Press (NZ). It is a non-fiction study of four fires that took place between 1967 and 1971 in Wellington, the investigations of which resulted in a major improvement in national fire safety regulations. The work controversially suggests that one of the fires—which resulted in seven deaths—may have been arson.
- Rustic (And Rusted) Daze, from Avalook Publications, (Australia) is the 7th in a humorous non-fiction series about the author's farm, friends, and animals.

=== Works involving Sherlock Holmes ===
- McConchie's collection of fourteen new Sherlock Holmes short stories, Sherlock Holmes: Repeat Business appeared from Wildside Press, in January 2014.
- McConchie's first double volume contained two short new Sherlock Holmes books, Mystery at Foxhunt Hall, and The Case of the Mummified Penguins, this work was published by Wildside Press April 2015. The duo appear under the combined title of Sherlock Holmes: Beastly Mysteries.
- McConchie's Holmes/Watson short story, A Mistress-Missing, appeared in the MX Books triple-volume hardcover anthology of all new Sherlock Holmes/John Watson short stories edited by David Marcum. The anthology, whose sales benefit the preservation of Conan Doyle's old home Undershaw, is the largest collection of Sherlock pastiches. McConchie's story was recommended for the Edgar Wallace (Short Story) Award.
- McConchie's Holmes/Watson book, out in 2016, Sherlock Holmes: Poisonous People comprises two shorter books (A Dreadful Diary, and A Poisoning At The Publisher.)The book is available for purchase from Wildside, Amazon and other venues.-->
- Meanwhile, the double volume Sherlock Holmes: Familiar Crimes (comprising This Awful Fire and Too Many Accidents) was published in April 2017.
- After discussion with the publisher the author began writing several novellas, also Holmes/Watson works, but which feature two on-going characters, a freelance secretary, Miss Emily Jackson, and her cat, a brown Burmese named Mandalay. Mandalay has a habit of bringing home strange items for his owner, some of which require investigation. In April (2016) the first appeared from Wildside – Sherlock Holmes (in) Something the Cat Dragged In. while the second appeared in June – Sherlock Holmes (in) Cat With a Vested Interest, with September seeing the third, Sherlock Holmes (in) Cat With Enough Rope. They are available from Wildside as e-works, and as a collected book (titled Catalyst) in print and electronic editions, and containing as well a long short story, Pinned to a Crime.
- Sherlock Holmes: Strange Events, comprising The Case of the Vanishing Omnibus, and The Mystery of the Misplaced Mother. appeared March 2018.
- also completed have been the next three "Mandalay" novellas. Cat's Paw, Cat and Mouse and Belling the Cat, along with short story, Kitty.
- the author has completed the next Holmes double – Found Dead – comprising, Dead in a Kitchen Chair, and To Whom It May Concern, this has sold to Wildside and is scheduled for publication in 2018.
- she has also completed and turned in for consideration the newest Mandalay compilation (Intended for 2018) Catastrophe, containing novellas, Dead Fell, Medium Dead, and Dead Loss, with short story, Dead and Gone.
- Her most recent book, Sherlock Holmes – Deadly Districts, comprising Death in the Mountains, and Death at The Plains, has also been turned into Wildside for consideration.

=== Other works of fiction ===
- Queen of Iron Years, appeared in May 2012 from Kite Kill Publishing (UK), a collaboration with long-time friend Sharman Horwood, an artist who also did the book's cover art. In this novel, Sean, transgender and obsessed with Boudicea, oppressed in his time and place for the possibility he may carry "Tenson's Virus", successfully goes back to prevent the Queen's original mistakes in battling the Romans. This results in an alternate world/history. This book won the Sir Julius Vogel Award for Best SF/F Book by a New Zealand author published the previous Year. (Queen of Iron Years has now been withdrawn from Kite Hill and has now been published by Wildside in the American edition, with a new cover, and re-edited. Wildside are also bringing it out in kindle.)
- Flying Free, from Sky Warrior Books (USA) is a Young Adult book published in 2013, with cover art by Sharman Horwood. Tina lives in an inner city penthouse. When she finds a giant baby bird in a nest on the roof she discovers that the baby is a New Zealand Haasts Eagle, long believed to be extinct. Tina gathers her friends to save him while evading the sinister scientist who threatens Icarus's existence.
- Katalagein – a collection of feline fantasy and sci/fi stories by Lyn McConchie was published in July 2013 from Sky Warrior Books (USA.) Five stories unpublished, several stories winners of Certificate of Excellence/Muse Medalion awarded by International Cat Writers Association.
- Her disaster novel, Vestiges of Flames appeared from Lethe Press (USA). This is an sf/disaster novel set in New Zealand. The book is currently under publisher preparation as an audio edition.
- Due to the publisher, Cyberwizerd Productions, folding at the end of May 2015, her young adult Four Season's Quartet books were transferred to Avalook Publications. Summer of Dreaming, and Autumn of the Wild Pony, appeared from there as reprints in 2015, with Winter of Waiting, and Spring of Decisions, as first publication at the same time.
- In April 2016 Wildside contracted McConchie's fantasy, 'Bastet's Daughters', set in an alternate ancient Egypt and from there into the alternate world of 'Aradia.' Some of her short stories were set in the same universe as this book, of which a number have appeared since the 1990s, including two in Marion Zimmer Bradley's Fantasy Magazine, and three in Andre Norton's Catfantastic anthologies. The book is now available on Amazon, from Wildside and other venues. This book was recently awarded the International Cat Writers Certificate of Excellence.
- The next in the series – Daughter of a City – has been turned in for consideration as of mid-June 2017.
- The author's second in a loose set of four SF/Disaster novels, COALS & ASH, was contracted in December to Altair Press in Australia and is scheduled for publication in August 2018. (The first in this series, Vestiges of Flames, appeared in America from Lethe Press, in 2015.)
