= Philippa Ballantine =

New Zealand writer

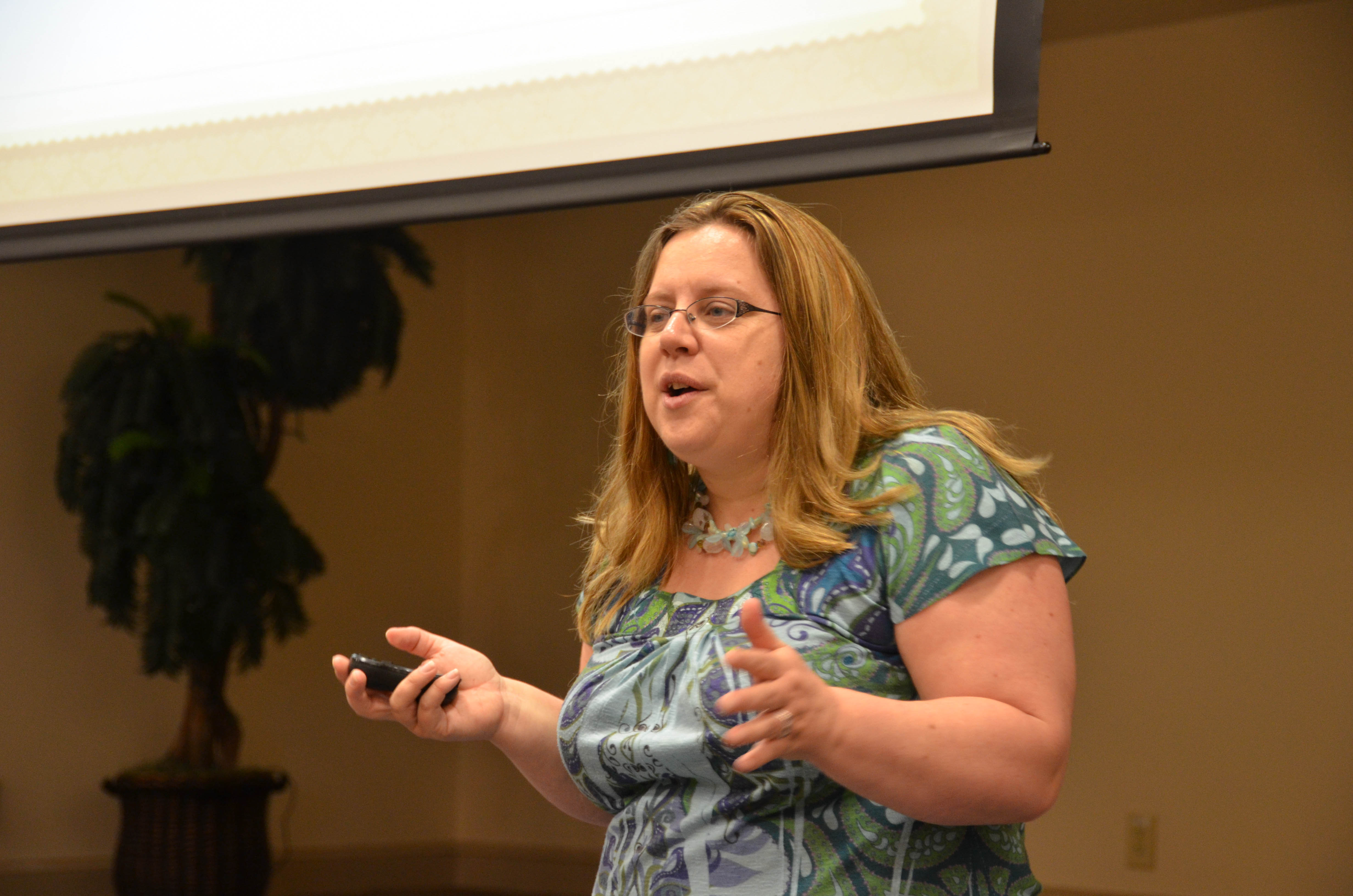
- Ballantine in 2012
- Born: 8 August 1971 (age 55); Wellington, New Zealand
- Occupation: author
- Writing career
- Pen name: Pip Ballantine
- Genre: Science fiction/Fantasy/Steampunk
- Movement: The Podiobook (Podcast Novel)
- Website: pjballantine.com

Philippa Ballantine (born 8 August 1971), who also used the pen name Pip Ballantine, is a contemporary New Zealand author of speculative fiction and an avid podcaster. She now lives in Manassas, Virginia, with her husband and collaborator Tee Morris.

== History ==
Philippa Jane Ballantine was born in Wellington, New Zealand. She attended Samuel Marsden Collegiate School and went on to graduate from Victoria University of Wellington with a BA in English and Political Science. She also holds a Bachelor of Applied Science in Library Studies from The Open Polytechnic of New Zealand.

In 2006 Ballantine became the first New Zealand author to podcast her novel.

Ballantine's first Book of the Order, Geist, was published by Ace Books in 2010, followed by Spectyr, Wrayth, and the final in the series Harbinger.

She is also the co-author with her husband Tee Morris of the "Ministry of Peculiar Occurrences" novels. The first, Phoenix Rising, came out in 2011 and won an Airship Award for best written work.

Phoenix Rising was also rated in the top 10 science fiction books of 2011 on goodreads.com. The sequel The Janus Affair was a Locus Bestseller and won the Steampunk Chronicle Readers Choice award for Best Fiction.

In 2011 she also signed a book deal with Pyr books for a two-book series, the first of which is Hunter and Fox. The second, Kindred and Wings, came out in 2013.

== Written material / podcasts ==
=== Books of the Order ===
- Philippa Ballantine, Geist (2010) Ace Books ISBN 0-441-01961-7
- Philippa Ballantine, Spectyr (2011) Ace Books ISBN 0-441-02051-8
- Philippa Ballantine, Wrayth (2012), Ace Books ISBN 1-937007-75-8
- Philippa Ballantine, Harbinger (2012), Ace Books ISBN 0-425-25655-3

=== The Ministry of Peculiar Occurrences novels ===
- Philippa Ballantine, Tee Morris, Phoenix Rising: A Ministry of Peculiar Occurrences Novel (2011), HarperVoyager ISBN 0-06-204976-3
- Philippa Ballantine, Tee Morris, The Janus Affair: A Ministry of Peculiar Occurrences Novel (2012), HarperVoyager ISBN 0-06-204978-X
- Philippa Ballantine, Tee Morris, Dawn's Early Light: A Ministry of Peculiar Occurrences Novel (2014), Ace Books ISBN 0-425-26731-8
- Philippa Ballantine, Tee Morris, The Diamond Conspiracy: A Ministry of Peculiar Occurrences Novel (2015), Ace Books ISBN 0-425-26732-6
- Philippa Ballantine, Tee Morris, The Ghost Rebellion: A Ministry of Peculiar Occurrences Novel (2016), CreateSpace Independent Publishing Platform ISBN 1-5328-8890-2

=== The Shifted World series ===
- Philippa Ballantine, Hunter and Fox (2012), Pyr Books ISBN 1-61614-623-0
- Philippa Ballantine, Kindred and Wings (2013), Pyr Books ISBN 1-61614-779-2

=== Verity Fitzroy and the Ministry Seven series ===
YA novella

- Philippa Ballantine, Tee Morris, The Curse of the Silver Pharaoh (2016), Imagine That! Studios ASIN B01IPJC0YG

=== Collections ===
- Philippa Ballantine, Tee Morris, Magical Mechanications (2016) Contains four steampunk novelettes: Little Red Flying Hood, Aladdin and His Wonderfully Infernal Device, Little Clockwork Mermaid, and Mechanical Wings, Imagine That! Studios ASIN B01EZJTNRW

=== Podcast novels ===
- Philippa Ballantine, Weaver's Web (2006) Podiobooks.com
- Philippa Ballantine, Chasing the Bard (2008) Podiobooks.com
- Philippa Ballantine, Weather Child (2009) Podiobooks.com
- Philippa Ballantine, Digital Magic (2010) Podiobooks.com

=== Collaborations ===
- Philippa Ballantine, contributor, "Pieces" (2008) Podiobooks.com

=== Podcasts ===
- Whispers at the Edge (2006–2008)
- The Shared Desk (2011–present)

=== Podcast anthology ===
- Tales from the Archives (2011–2016)
- Chronicles of the Order (2010–2011)
- Erotica à la Carte (2008–2010)

== Awards and recognition ==
- 2013 Steampunk Chronicle Readers Choice Award winner for Best Fiction
- 2012 Parsec Award winner for Best Speculative Fiction: Small Cast (Short Form)
- 2011 Airship Award winner for best written work (with Tee Morris)
- 2011 Sir Julius Vogel Award nominee for Best Novel- Adult
- 2010 Parsec Award finalist for Best Speculative Fiction Magazine or Anthology Podcast
- 2010 Sir Julius Vogel Award finalist for Best fan production
- 2009 Parsec Award finalist for Best Speculative Fiction Magazine or Anthology Podcast
- 2009 Sir Julius Vogel Award winner for Best fan production
- 2009 Sir Julius Vogel Award nominee for Best Novel- Adult
- 2007 Parsec Award finalist for Best Writing Podcast
- 2006 Sir Julius Vogel Award nominee for Best Novel
