= Sir Julius Vogel Award =

NZ literary awards for sci-fi, fantasy and horror

The Sir Julius Vogel Awards are awarded each year at the New Zealand National Science Fiction Convention to recognise achievement in New Zealand science fiction, fantasy, horror, and science fiction fandom. They are commonly referred to as the Vogels.

== Name ==
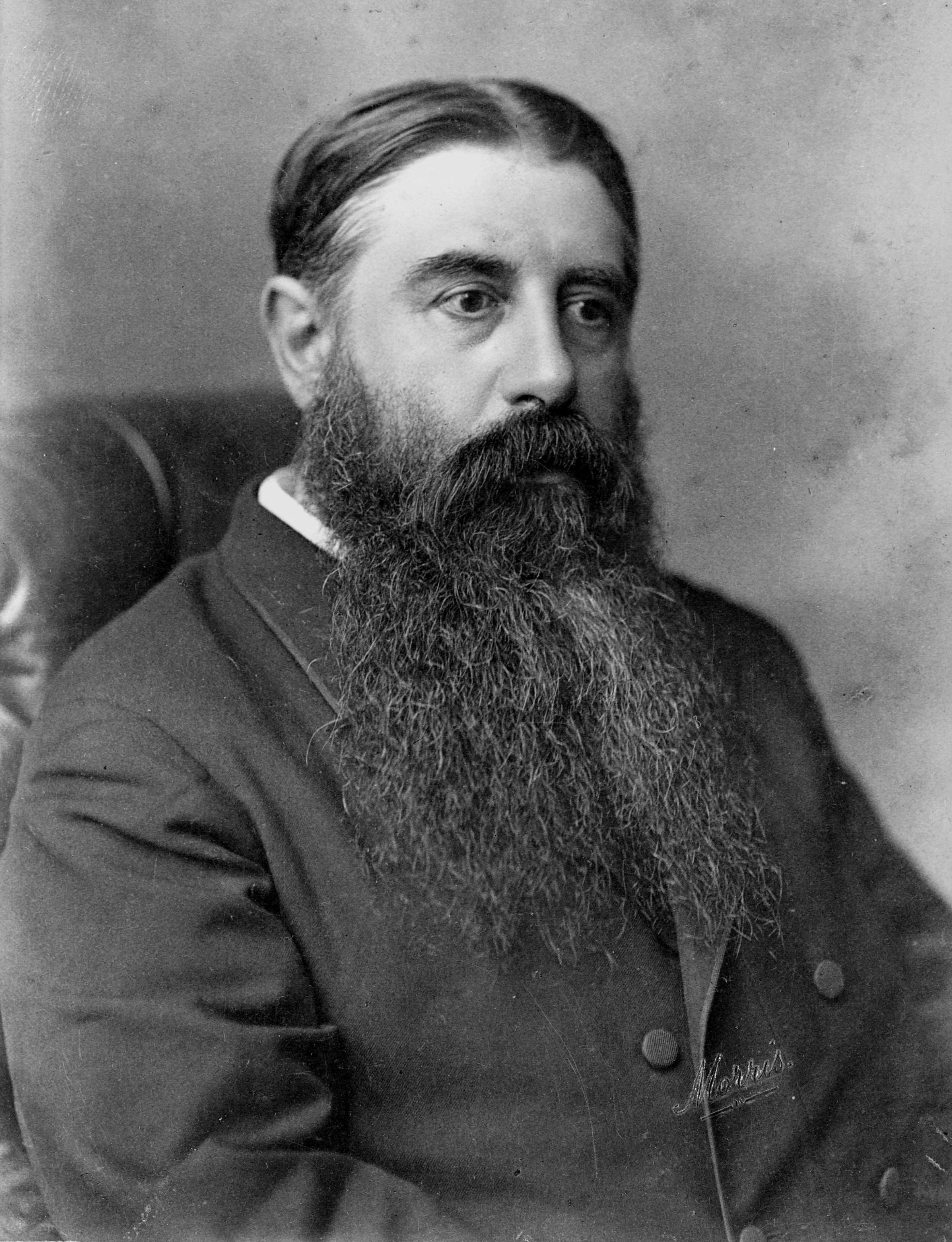
Sir Julius Vogel, 8th Prime Minister of New Zealand.

The awards are named for Sir Julius Vogel, a prominent New Zealand journalist and politician, who was Premier of New Zealand twice during the 1870s. He also, in 1889, wrote what is widely regarded as New Zealand's first science fiction novel, Anno Domini 2000, or, Woman's Destiny. The book, written and published in Great Britain after Vogel had moved from New Zealand, pictured a New Zealand in the year 2000 where most positions of authority were held by women—at the time of writing, a radical proposition. In 2000, New Zealand's Head of State, Governor General, Prime Minister, Chief Justice and Attorney General were all women, as was the CEO of one of the country's largest companies, Telecom.

== History ==
National awards have been presented annually since 1989, but were initially simply known as the New Zealand Science Fiction Fan Awards, and were originally aimed primarily at fandom rather than at professional science fiction. In these early years the awards were organised on an ad-hoc basis by the organising committees of the national conventions, though with the support of the former national fan organisation, the National Association for Science Fiction which nominally ran the awards from 1993. In the early 1990s the awards were briefly known as the Edmund Bayne Awards, after a well-known Wellington fan who had been killed in a road accident, but this name was never formalised.

In 2002 the awards were revamped and reorganised, and since that time have been aimed more at the professional science fiction and fantasy community. The current name also dates to 2002. These changes accompanied a change in the organisation of the awards, which are now formally run by national organisation SFFANZ (the Science Fiction and Fantasy Association of New Zealand).

Categories change to some extent on an annual basis, but generally include professional awards for best novel, short story, dramatic presentation, and services to science fiction, as well as equivalent fan awards. Due to the size of New Zealand's science fiction, fantasy, and horror fiction communities, the awards cover all three of these frequently intertwined genres and attempt to treat each equally.

== New Zealand science fiction fan award winners 1989-2001 ==
1989

- Best fan writing: Alan Robson
- Best fanzine: Phlogiston
- Best fan art: Dan McCarthy
- Best fan editor: Alex Heatley

Numerous other one-off awards were made in these debut awards

1990

- Best fan writing (general): Alan Robson
- Best fan writing (media): Lana Brown
- Best fanzine: Cry Havoc
- Best media fanzine: Katra
- Best fan art: Peter Gainsford
- Best fan editor: Lyn McConchie

1991

- Best fan writing: Alan Robson
- Best fanzine: Phlogiston
- Best fan art: Dan McCarthy
- Best fan editor: Alex Heatley

1992

- Best fan writing: Alan Robson
- Best fanzine: Phlogiston
- Best fan art (tie): James Benson and Mike Hanson
- Best fan editor (tie): James Dignan and Alex Heatley

1993

- Best fan writing: Jon Preddle
- Best general fanzine: Timestreams
- Best club fanzine: Time Space Visualiser
- Best fan art: Warwick Gray
- Special achievement: Lana Brown

1994

- Best fan writing: Anne Marie Lloyd
- Best fanzine: Chunder
- Best fan art: Mark Roach
- Best other publication: Trimmings from the Triffid's Beard

1995

- Best fan writing: Peter Friend and Li Cross (co-authors)
- Best fanzine: Time Space Visualiser
- Best fan art: Warwick Gray
- Best other publication: The Best of Time Space Visualiser 21-26
- Special achievement: Continuum convention committee

1996

- Best fan writing: Peter Friend
- Best fanzine: Phoenixine
- Best fan art: Nick Kim

1997-2000 (details unknown)

2001

- Best fan writing: Jon Preddle
- Best fanzine: Phoenixine
- Best fan art: Richard Manx
- Services to fandom: Paul Scoones

== Professional award winners since 2002 ==
2002

- Best Novel: First Hunter by Dale Elvy
- Best Short Story: "The Good Earth" by Peter Friend
- Dramatic Presentation - Long Form: The Lord of the Rings: The Fellowship of the Ring
- Best New Talent: Dale Elvy
- Services to Science Fiction and Fantasy: Peter Jackson, Fran Walsh, and Phillipa Boyens

2003

- Best Novel: Beast Master’s Ark by Andre Norton and Lyn McConchie
- Best Art Work: John Baster, Mary Maclachlan
- Services to Science Fiction and Fantasy: Weta Workshop, Weta Digital

2004

- Best Novel: Dark Shinto by Dale Elvy
- Best Short Story (tie): "A Plea for Help" by Kevin G Maclean and "The Alchemist" by Peter Friend
- Best New Talent: Glynne Maclean
- Special Award: Peter Jackson and the team responsible for The Lord of the Rings film trilogy

2005

- Best Novel: Beastmaster’s Circus by Lyn McConchie and Andre Norton
- Best Short Story: "When Dragons Dream” by Kevin G Maclean
- Services to Science Fiction and Fantasy: Ken Catran

2006

- Best Novel: The Duke's Ballad by Andre Norton and Lyn McConchie
- Best Short Story: "The Real Deal” by Peter Friend
- Services to Science Fiction and Fantasy: Margaret Mahy

2007

- Best Novel: The Assassin of Gleam by James Norcliffe
- Best Short Story: "Western Front, 1914” by Peter Friend
- Best Dramatic Presentation - Long Form: Maddigan's Quest
- Best New Talent: Douglas A. Van Belle

2008

- Best Novel - Adult: Path of Revenge by Russell Kirkpatrick
- Best Novel - Young Adult (tie): The Sea-wreck Stranger by Anna Mackenzie and Cybele's Secret by Juliet Marillier
- Best Short Story (tie): "Fendraaken" by Kevin G. Maclean and "Mist and Murder" by Lucy Sussex
- Best Novella/Novelette: Beat of Temptation by Nalini Singh
- Best Anthology: Doorways for the Dispossessed by Paul Haines
- Best Dramatic Presentation - Long Form: Black Sheep
- Best Dramatic Presentation - Short Form: "Buy Kiwi Made" advertising campaign
- Best New Talent: Tracie McBride
- Services to Science Fiction: Andromeda Spaceways Inflight Magazine Publishing Co-operative

2009

- Best Novel - Adult: Dark Heart by Russell Kirkpatrick
- Best Novel - Young Adult: Thornspell by Helen Lowe
- Best Short Story: "Under Waves and Over" by Grant Stone
- Best Novella/Novelette: "Stroke of Enticement" by Nalini Singh
- Best Collected Work: "The Invisible Road" by Elizabeth Knox
- Best Professional Artwork: Cover for Newtons Sleep by Emma Weakley
- Best Dramatic Presentation - Short Form: "Skankenstein" (music video)
- Best Professional Publication: "Deputy Dan and The Mysterious Midnight Marauder" by Sally McLennan and Joel Liochon
- Best New Talent: Helen Lowe

2010

- Best Novel: Beyond The Wall Of Time by Russell Kirkpatrick
- Best Young Adult Novel: Brainjack by Brian Falkner
- Best Novella/Novelette: "Wives" by Paul Haines
- Best Short Story (tie): "Corrigan's Exchange" by Ripley Patton and "The Living Dead Boy" by Grant Stone
- Best Collected Work: "Voyagers: Science Fiction Poetry From New Zealand" by Mark Pirie and Tim Jones (editors)
- Best Artwork: "The Test" by Serena Kearns
- Best Dramatic Presentation - Long Form: "Under the Mountain" (dir. Jonathan King)
- Best Production/Publication: "Semaphore Magazine" by Marie Hodgkinson
- Best New Talent: Simon Petrie
- Services to Science Fiction, Fantasy and Horror: Phillip Mann

2011

- Best Novel (tie): The Heir Of Night by Helen Lowe and The Questing Road by Lyn McConchie
- Best Young Adult Novel: Summer Of Dreaming by Lyn McConchie
- Best Novella/Novelette: "A Tale Of The Interferers - Hunger For Forbidden Flesh" by Paul Haines
- Best Short Story: High Tide At Hot Water Beach by Paul Haines
- Best Collected Work: "A Foreign Country - New Zealand Speculative Fiction" by Anna Caro and Juliet Buchanan (editors)
- Best Artwork: Cover for Tymon's Flight by Frank Victoria
- Best Dramatic Presentation (tie): "This Is Not My Life" - Pilot Episode (Executive Producers: Gavin Strawhan, Rachel Lang, Steven O'Meagher, Tim White. Producer: Tim Sanders. Directors: Robert Sarkies, Peter Salmon. Associate Producer: Polly Fryer) and "Kaitangata Twitch" - Pilot Episode by Yvonne Mackay
- Best Production/Publication: "White Cloud Worlds Anthology" by Paul Tobin (editor)
- Best New Talent: Karen Healey
- Services to Science Fiction, Fantasy and Horror: Simon Litten

2012

- Best Novel: Samiha's Song by Mary Victoria
- Best Youth Novel: Battle of the Birds by Lee Murray
- Best Novella/Novelette: "Steam Girl" by Dylan Horrocks
- Best Short Story: Frankie and the Netball Clone by Alicia Ponder
- Best Collected Work: "Tales for Canterbury" by Cassie Hart and Anna Caro (editors)
- Best Professional Artwork: Cover for Oracle's Fire by Frank Victoria
- Best Dramatic Presentation: "The Almighty Johnsons" (Producer: Simon Bennett. Writers: Rachel Lang and James Griffin)
- Best New Talent: K. D. Berry
- Services to Science Fiction, Fantasy and Horror: Ripley Patton

2013

- Best Novel: Queen of Iron Years by Lyn McConchie and Sharman Horwood
- Best Youth Novel: The Prince of Soul and the Lighthouse by Frederik Brounéus
- Best Novella/Novelette: "Flight 404" by Simon Petrie
- Best Short Story: Hope is the thing with feathers by Lee Murray
- Best Collected Work: "Mansfield with Monsters" by Matt and Debbie Cowens
- Best Professional Artwork: Cover for Light Touch Paper, Stand Clear by Les Petersen
- Best Professional Production/Publication: "The Hobbit: An Unexpected Journey: Chronicles" (Art and Design by Daniel Falconer (WetaNZ)
- Best Dramatic Presentation: The Hobbit: An Unexpected Journey (Peter Jackson, Philippa Boyens, Fran Walsh, Guillermo del Toro)
- Best New Talent: Matt and Debbie Cowens
- Services to Science Fiction, Fantasy And Horror: Stephen Minchin

2014

- Best Novel: Heartwood by Freya Robertson
- Best Youth Novel: Raven Flight by Juliet Marillier
- Best Novella: Cave Fever by Lee Murray
- Best Short Story: By Bone-Light by Juliet Marillier
- Best Collected Work: Baby Teeth by Lee Murray and Dan Rabarts (editors)
- Best Professional Artwork: Cover for Regeneration: Best New Zealand Speculative Fiction by Emma Weakley
- Best Professional Publication/Production: WearableArt by Craig Potton
- Best Dramatic Presentation: The Almighty Johnsons (Season Three), South Pacific Films

=== 2015 ===
- Best Novel: Engines of Empathy by Paul Mannering
- Best Youth Novel: The Caller: Shadowfell by Juliet Marillier
- Best Novella: Peach and Araxi by Celine Murray
- Best Short Story: Inside Ferndale by Lee Murray
- Best Collected Work: Lost in the Museum, Phoenix Writer's Group
- Best Professional Artwork: Cover for Lost in the Museum by Geoff Popham
- Best Professional Production/Publication: Weta: 20 Years of Imagination on Screen, Clare Burgess with Brian Stubley
- Best Dramatic Presentation: What We Do In The Shadows, dir Jemaine Clement and Taika Waititi

=== 2016 ===
- Best Novel: Ardus by Jean Gilbert
- Best Youth Novel: Dragons Realm (You Say Which Way)] by Eileen Mueller
- Best Novella/Novelette: The Ghost of Matter by Octavia Cade
- Best Short Story: The Thief's Tale by Lee Murray
- Best Collected Work: Work Off Line 2015: The Earth We Knew, Jean Gilbert and Chad Dick (editors)
- Best Professional Artwork: Cover for Shortcuts - Track 1 by Casey Bailey
- Best Professional Production/Publication: White Clouds World Anthology 3, Weta Workshops, Paul Tobin (editor)
- Best New Talent: Jean Gilbert
- Services to Science Fiction, Fantasy, and Horror: Marie Hodgkinson

=== 2017 ===
- Best Novel: Into the Mist by Lee Murray
- Best Youth Novel: Light in My Dark by Jean Gilbert and William Dresden
- Best Novella/Novelette: The Convergence of Fairy Tales by Octavia Cade
- Best Short Story: Splintr by A.J. Fitzwater
- Best Collected Work: At the Edge, Dan Rabarts and Lee Murray (editors)
- Best Professional Artwork: Cover for At the Edge by Emma Weakley
- Best Professional Production/Publication: That Kind of Planet by Emma Weakley
- Best Dramatic Presentation: This Giant Papier Mache Boulder is Actually Really Heavy, dir Christian Nicholson
- Best New Talent: Eileen Mueller
- Services To Science Fiction, Fantasy And Horror: Lee Murray

=== 2018 ===
- Best Novel: Hounds of the Underworld by Dan Rabarts and Lee Murray
- Best Youth Novel: The Traitor and the Thief by Gareth Ward
- Best Novella/Novelette: Matters Arising from the Identification of the Body by Simon Petrie
- Best Short Story: Crimson Birds of Small Miracles by Sean Monaghan
- Best Collected Work: Mariah's Prologues by Grace Bridges
- Best Professional Artwork: Cover for Teleport by Kate Strawbridge
- Best Professional Production/Publication: Mistlands by Layla Rose
- Best Dramatic Presentation: The Changeover, directed by Stuart McKenzie and Miranda Harcourt

=== 2019 ===
- Best Novel: Into the Sounds by Lee Murray
- Best Youth Novel: Lutapolii – White Dragon of the South by Deryn Pittar
- Best Novella/Novelette: The Martian Job by M. Darusha Wehm
- Best Short Story: Girls Who do not Drown by A.C. Buchanan
- Best Collected Work: Te Korero Ahi Kā, edited by Grace Bridges, Lee Murray and Aaron Compton
- Best Professional Artwork: Cover for The Baker Thief by Laya Rose
- Best Professional Production/Publication: The Black Archive #15: Full Circle by John Toon
- Best Dramatic Presentation: Wellington Paranormal, directed by Jemaine Clement and Jackie van Beek

=== 2020 ===
- Best Novel: The Dawnhounds by Sascha Stronach
- Best Youth Novel: The Clockill and the Thief by Gareth Ward
- Best Novella/Novelette: From A Shadow Grave by Andi C. Buchanan
- Best Short Story: A Shriek Across The Sky by Casey Lucas
- Best Collected Work: Year’s Best Aotearoa New Zealand Science Fiction and Fantasy, Vol 1, edited by Marie Hodgkinson
- Best Professional Artwork: Cover for Dragon Pearl by Vivienne To
- Best Professional Production/Publication: Swords: The Webcomic by Matthew Wills
- Best Dramatic Presentation: Dr Who: The Elysian Blade, David Bishop

=== 2021 ===
- Best Novel: The Stone Wētā by Octavia Cade
- Best Youth Novel: These Violent Delights by Chloe Gong
- Best Novella/Novelette: No Man’s Land by A. J. Fitzwater
- Best Short Story: For Want of Parts by Casey Lucas
- Best Collected Work: The Voyages of Cinrak the Dapper by A. J. Fitzwater
- Best Professional Artwork: Laya Rose, for the cover art for No Man’s Land by A. J. Fitzwater
- Best Professional Production/Publication: How New Zealand's Best Fantasy and Science Fiction Authors got Shafted on a Global Stage by Casey Lucas

=== 2022 ===
- Best Novel: Butcherbird, Cassie Hart
- Best Youth Novel: Fire’s Caress, Lani Wendt Young
- Best Novella/Novelette: The Impossible Resurrection of Grief, Octavia Cade
- Best Short Story: "Data Migration", Melanie Harding-Shaw
- Best Collected Work: Year's Best Aotearoa New Zealand Science Fiction & Fantasy Vol 3, edited by Marie Hodgkinson
- Best Professional Artwork: Laya Rose, for the cover art of Foxhunt
- Best Professional Production/Publication: What You Need Right Now is a Nice Soothing Horror Story, Tabatha Wood

=== 2023 ===
- Best Novel: A Rake of His Own, A. J. Lancaster
- Best Youth Novel: The Rarkyn's Familiar, Nikky Lee
- Best Novella: How to Get a Girlfriend (When You're a Terrifying Monster), Marie Cardno
- Best Novelette: "How to Marry a Winged King", A. J. Lancaster
- Best Short Story: "My Nascent Garden", Melanie Harding-Shaw
- Best Collected Work: Year's Best Aotearoa New Zealand Science Fiction & Fantasy Volume 4, Emily Brill-Holland
- Best Professional Artwork: Rebecca Hawkes for the cover of Year's Best Aotearoa New Zealand Science Fiction & Fantasy Volume 4
- Best Professional Production/Publication: The Black Archive #61 – Paradise Towers, John Toon

=== 2024 ===
- Best Novel: A New Eden by Menilik Henry Dyer
- Best Youth Novel: Maggie and the Mountain of Light by Mark Snoad (joint winner)
- Best Youth Novel: A Spring of Magic by Janna Ruth (joint winner)
- Best Novella: Hamlet, Prince of Robots by M. Darusha Wehm
- Best Novelette: "Happiness" by Octavia Cade
- Best Short Story: "What Bones These Tides Bring" by Nikky Lee
- Best Collected Work: You Are My Sunshine and Other Stories by Octavia Cade (joint winner)
- Best Collected Work: Remains To Be Told: Dark Tales of Aotearoa by Lee Murray (joint winner)
- Best Artwork: Bex Blackwood for Tarquin the Honest; Occian's Elven
- Best Production/Publication: Creamerie – Season 2 written by Kirsty Fisher, Roseanne Liang, Dan Musgrove & Shoshona McCallum
- Best Dramatic Presentation: Sidetrack by Andi C. Buchanan
- Best New Talent: Menilik Henry Dyer

=== 2025 ===
- Best Novel: Echoes of Earthshine by Mel Harding-Shaw
- Best Youth Novel: The Moonlight Bridge by Mike Gwyther
- Best Novella or Novelette: We Who Remain by Nikky Lee
- Best Short Story: "N-spired Learning" by B. T. Keaton
- Best Collected Work: Artificial Sweetener: Tales of AI: 100% Written by Humans edited by Cerid Jones, Gary Nelson, Linda Bennett & Melissa Gunn
- Best Artwork: Melissa Gunn for Artificial Sweetener: Tales of AI: 100% Written by Humans
- Best Production/Publication: "Fact, Fiction, and Feeling: Ecological Grief in a Changing World" by Octavia Cade
- Best Dramatic Presentation: The Bostrom Scenario written and directed by Ricky Townsend

=== 2026 ===
- Best Novel: Dancing in the Purple Rain, Judy L. Mohr
- Best Youth Novel: Wyld Witch Weather, Janna Ruth
- Best Novella or Novelette: Grimoires and Green Tea, Melissa Gunn
- Best Short Story: "Have a Nice Death", Brandon Keaton
- Best Collected Work: Omens, Aaron Dick
- Best Artwork: Kura Jane Carpenter for Pride and Prejudice and Mice
- Best Production/Publication: “Toroa: Skycall”
- Best Dramatic Presentation: Warren’s Vortex

== Fan award winners since 2002 ==
2002

- Best Fan Writing: Alan Robson
- Best Fanzine: Phoenixine
- Best Fan Art: Nick Kim
- Services to Fandom: Norman Cates and the SFFANZ discussion group

2003

- Best Fan Writing: Alan Robson
- Best Fanzine: Phoenixine
- Best Fan Art: Grant Preston
- Services to Fandom: William Geradts and Adele Geradts

2004

- Best Fanzine: Phoenixine
- Services to Fandom: Laurie Fleming

2005

- Best Fan Writing: Alan Robson
- Best Fanzine (tied): Phoenixine and Time Space Visualiser
- Services to Fandom: Martin Kealey

2006

- Best Fan Writing: Alan Robson
- Best Fanzine: Phoenixine
- Best Fan Production: King (short film)
- Services to Fandom: Norman Cates

2007

- Best Fan Writing: Alan Robson
- Services to Fandom: John and Lynelle Howell

2008

- Best Fan Writing: Ross Temple
- Best Fanzine: Phoenixine
- Best Fan Production: Renaldo, First Sheep on the Moon?
- Services to Fandom: Simon Litten

2009

- Best Fan Writing: "Disappointment" (article by Alex Lindsay)
- Best Fan Production: Chasing the Bard (podcast by Philippa Ballantine)
- Best Fan Publication: The Girl Who Asked for Wisdom and Other Stories by Catherine and Stephanie Pegg
- Services to Fandom: Maree Pavletich

2010

- Best Fan Writing: "SJV Watch" and "SFFANZ Reviews" (articles by Simon Litten)
- Best Fan Production: Coals To Newcastle (short film by Yvonne Harrison)
- Best Fan Publication (tie): Phoenixine by John and Lynelle Howell (editors) and Time Space Visualiser by Adam McGechen (editor)
- Services to Fandom: David Lee-Smith

2011

- Best Fan Writing: "Musings From Under The Mountain" and Novazine contributions by Jacqui Smith
- Best Fan Production: Doctor Who (podcast by Paul Mannering)
- Best Fan Publication: Novazine by Jacqui Smith (editor)
- Best Fan Artwork: Cover for StarshipSofa 150 by Gino Moretto
- Services to Fandom: Ross Temple

2012

- Best Fan Writing: Various articles for Phoenixine and Novazine by Simon Litten
- Best Fan Publication: Phoenixine
- Best Fan Artwork: Various artwork in Phoenixine by Nick Kim
- Services to Fandom: Jacqui and Keith Smith

2013

- Best Fan Writing: "Strange Matter" and occasional essays within Phoenixine by John Toon
- Best Fan Production: AetherCon
- Best Fan Publication: Phoenixine
- Best Fan Artwork: Contributions to Novazine by Keith Smith
- Services to Fandom: Annette Bergner

2014

- Best Fan Writing (tie): Alan Parker "Presidential Address", Novazine; Lynnelle Howell "Presidential Sweet/DuhVice", Phoenixine
- Best Fan Production/Publication: Phoenixine, John and Lynelle Howell
- Best New Talent: Dan Rabarts
- Services to Fandom: The League of Victorian Imagineers
- Services to Science Fiction, Fantasy, and Horror: Helen Lowe

2015

- Best Fan Writing: Rebecca Fisher
- Best Fan Production/Publication: Phoenixine, John and Lynelle Howell
- Best Fan Artwork: Keith Smith, Novazine
- Best New Talent: A.J. Fitzwater
- Services to Science Fiction, Fantasy, and Horror: Hugh Cook

2016

- Best Fan Writing: John Toon, Phoenixine
- Best Fan Production/Publication: Phoenixine, John and Lynelle Howell
- Best Fan Artist: Keith Smith
- Services to Fandom: Glenn Young

2017

- Best Fan Writing: Octavia Cade
- Best Fan Production/ Publication: Summer Star Trek: Mirror, Mirror, Enterprise Entertainment
- Best Fan Artist: Keith Smith
- Services to Fandom: Lynelle Howell

2022

- Best Fan Writing: Andi C. Buchanan
- Best Fan Production/ Publication: Phoenixine, John & Jo Toon
- Best Fan Artist: Michelle Kan and Jules (joint winners)
- Services to Fandom: Michelle Kan

2023

- Best Fan Writing: Rem Wigmore
- Best Fan Production/ Publication: Phoenixine, John & Jo Toon
- Best Fan Artist: Leadambeck
- Services to Fandom: Matthew Pavletich

2024

- Best Fan Writing: Jo Toon
- Best Fan Production/Publication: Phoenix Science Fiction Society Inc., John & Jo Toon

2025

- Best Fan Writing: John Toon
- Best Fan Artwork: Martyn Buyck
- Best Fan Production/Publication: Phoenixine, John & Jo Toon

2026

- Services to Fandom: The Fantasizers Festival, Carl Yates
- Services to Science Fiction, Fantasy or Horror: Lee Murray
- Best New Talent: Judy L. Mohr
