= Warsaw Shore series 19 =

Warsaw Shore
- Season 19
- No. of episodes: 13

Release
- Original network: MTV; Player international
- Original release: 17 September – 10 December 2023

Series chronology
- ← Previous; Series 18 Next → Series 20

The nineteenth series of Warsaw Shore, a Polish television programme based in Warsaw, Poland was announced on 21 June 2023 and began airing on 17 September 2023. The series was filmed in Mielno, making this the third series to be filmed there following the sixth series in 2016 and twelfth series in 2019. This is the first series to include two new cast members, Iryna "Renatka" Maltseva and Ronaldo „Czarny Polak” Miranda. This is also the first series not to include Wiktoria "Jaszczur" Robert, Piotr Nowakowski, Eliasz Zdzitowiecki and Oliwia Dziatkiewicz after their departures the previous season.

== Cast ==
- Aleksandra "Ola" Okrzesik
- Angelika Kramer
- Iryna "Renatka" Maltseva
- Lena Majewska
- Marcin "Mały" Pastuszka
- Milena Łaszek
- Patryk Spiker
- Ronaldo „Czarny Polak” Miranda
- Michał "Sarna" Sarnowski
- Przemysław "Sequento" Skulski

=== Duration of cast ===
Cast members	Series 19												
Cast members	1	2	3	4	5	6	7	8	9	10	11	12	13
Aleksandra													
Angelika													
Iryna													
Lena													
Marcin													
Milena													
Patryk													
Przemysław													
Ronaldo													
Sarna													

=== Notes ===
Key: = "Cast member" is featured in this episode.
Key: = "Cast member" arrives in the house.
Key: = "Cast member" voluntarily leaves the house.
Key: = "Cast member" returns to the house.
Key: = "Cast member" leaves the series.
Key: = "Cast member" does not feature in this episode.

== Episodes ==
No. overall	No. in season	Title	Original release date	Viewers (millions)
229	1	"Episode 1"	17 September 2023	TBA
230	2	"Episode 2"	24 September 2023	TBA
231	3	"Episode 3"	1 October 2023	TBA
232	4	"Episode 4"	8 October 2023	TBA
233	5	"Episode 5"	15 October 2023	TBA
234	6	"Episode 6"	22 October 2023	TBA
235	7	"Episode 7"	29 October 2023	TBA
236	8	"Episode 8"	5 November 2023	TBA
237	9	"Episode 9"	12 November 2023	TBA
238	10	"Episode 10"	19 November 2023	TBA
239	11	"Episode 11"	26 November 2023	TBA
240	12	"Episode 12"	3 December 2023	TBA
241	13	"Episode 13"	10 December 2023	TBA
