= Warsaw Shore series 16 =

Warsaw Shore
- Season 16
- No. of episodes: 12 + 1 Special

Release
- Original network: MTV; Player international
- Original release: 19 September – 12 December 2021

Series chronology
- ← Previous; Series 15 Next → Series 17

The sixteenth series of Warsaw Shore, a Polish television programme based in Warsaw, Poland was announced in May 2021 and began airing on 19 September 2021. The series was filmed in the Polish seaside town Łeba. This is the first series since the thirteen season to be filmed in public places, this due to the situation in Poland during the COVID-19 pandemic. This is also the first series not to include Ewa Piekut, Damian "Dzik" Graf, Kinga Gondorowicz, and Maciek Szczukiewicz after their departures the previous season. Ewelina Kubiak and Daniel Jabłoński returned as main cast members. It was also the first series to include only one new cast member, Michał "Sarna" Sarnowski. The series also featured the show's 200th episode. This was the final series to feature Kasjusz "Don Kasjo" Życiński following his decision to quit the show. This was the final series to include cast members Daniel "Arnold" Jabłoński, Patrycja Morkowska, Radosław "Diva" Majchrowski, and the original member Ewelina Kubiak.

== Cast ==
- Damian "Dzik" Graf (Episode 10–11)
- Daniel "Arnold" Jabłoński
- Radosław "Diva" Majchrowski
- Ewelina Kubiak
- Jeremiasz "Jez" Szmigiel
- Kamil Jagielski
- Kasjusz "Don Kasjo" Życiński
- Lena Majewska
- Milena Łaszek
- Oliwia Dziatkiewicz
- Patrycja Morkowska
- Patryk Spiker
- Piotr "Pedro" Polak (Episode 5–6)
- Michał "Sarna" Sarnowski

=== Duration of cast ===
Cast members	Series 16											
Cast members	1	2	3	4	5	6	7	8	9	10	11	12
Damian G												
Daniel												
Diva												
Ewelina												
Jeremiasz												
Kamil												
Kasjusz												
Lena												
Milena												
Oliwia												
Patrycja												
Patryk												
Piotr												
Sarna												

=== Notes ===
Key: = "Cast member" is featured in this episode.
Key: = "Cast member" arrives in the house.
Key: = "Cast member" voluntarily leaves the house.
Key: = "Cast member" returns to the house.
Key: = "Cast member" leaves the series.
Key: = "Cast member" returns to the series.

== Episodes ==
No. overall	No. in season	Title	Original release date	Viewers (millions)
192	1	"Episode 1"	19 September 2021	TBA
The team arrives in Łeba. Don Kasjo's special entrance does not impress Patrycja. New member Sarna immediately gets the girls' attention. Ewelina and Arnold reunite with their friends. Ptyś stops by and tells stories of series 4. The party continues at the beach.
193	2	"Episode 2"	26 September 2021	TBA
Diva arrives right in time for the first club event. Lena is devastated when she hears Kamil may have a bet involving her. Sarna expects to have a successful night. However, it is Jez who connects with many women. Kamil and Patrycja go to the sleep room, causing an argument.
194	3	"Episode 3"	3 October 2021	TBA
The team's first activity is horseback riding. Oliwia, Patrycja, and Sarna come up with a plan while working at the stables. Before the "Panty Conquerors" enter battle, the team conquers a colourful event. Kamil notices a threat in Sarna, who is Lena's target at the club.
195	4	"Episode 4"	10 October 2021	TBA
There is a conflict between Kamil and Jez. Don Kasjo helps resolve their differences and becomes the reigning "Panty Conqueror". Milena is too tired to go to work. Diva and Spiker prepare surprises for the weddings of summer camp.
196	5	"Episode 5"	17 October 2021	TBA
Pedro and his friend Mikołaj join the team for the weddings. A grand celebration takes place at the villa. During the after party, Mikołaj's behaviour annoys the team. Thanks to the help of a wingman, Kamil has a very successful night.
197	6	"Episode 6"	24 October 2021	TBA
Arnold breaks up a fight between Milena and Kamil. Diva impresses while working at the fish market. Back at the house, the "pot team" makes a loud return. The group goes to an amusement park. As punishment for her laziness, Milena has to clean the whole house.
198	7	"Episode 7"	31 October 2021	TBA
Sarna, Jez, and Kamil form an alliance. In a sparkling clean house, the "Three Musketeers" do their best to impress their goddesses. Spiker's guest tries to impress Milena. The team takes a trip to Charbrowo. They discover that farm life is not only idyllic, but also an exciting race.
199	8	"Episode 8"	7 November 2021	TBA
The team creates a movie. Don Kasjo gives advice to Sarna before a night out. At the club, Milena fights with an aggressive guest while Lena is jealous of Sarna's success. An intimate moment between Spiker and Kamil creates a big drama.
200	9	"Episode 9"	21 November 2021	TBA
The level of adrenaline rises when the team goes parachuting. Afterwards, they relax on a luxury catamaran cruise. Patrycja meets a faithful admirer at the club in Gdańsk. Jez and Kamil have a successful night after resolving their latest quarrel.
201	10	"Episode 10"	28 November 2021	TBA
Kayaks awaken the spirit of competition. Dzik's unexpected visit sends the team to a double party! Sarna is better at picking up than apologizing, while Kamil struggles to resist Lena.
202	11	"Episode 11"	5 December 2021	TBA
A quick morning training starts a new day! The flyboard is not an easy challenge, but it is harder for the crew to understand Don Kasjo's disappearance.
203	12	"Episode 12"	12 December 2021	TBA
Self defense secrets can be useful, but not everyone sees the point in cleaning a cutter. Memorial tattoos turn out to be a cure for pain. The Four Aces take the reins during the last night!
–	–	"Extra"	12 December 2021	TBA
