= Warsaw Shore series 10 =

Warsaw Shore
- Season 10
- No. of episodes: 12

Release
- Original network: MTV; Player international
- Original release: 21 October 2018 – 20 January 2019

Series chronology
- ← Previous; Series 9 Next → Series 11

The tenth series of Warsaw Shore (Stylized as the Warsaw Shore X), a Polish television programme based in Warsaw, Poland was filmed in July 2018, and began airing on 21 October 2018. The series was filmed in Polish seaside town Łeba rather than Warsaw, making this the second series to be filmed here following the fourth series in 2015. Ahead of the series it was announced that former cast member Klaudia Stec would be making a return to the show. It was also confirmed that four new cast members had joined the series, including Filip Ćwiek who had previously appeared on second series of Ex on the Beach Poland as main cast member, Julia Kruzer, Patryk Spiker and Klaudia "Czaja" Czajkowska.

This is the first series not to include original cast member Wojtek Gola after he quit the show for personal reasons. The series also featured the brief return of nine former cast members Wiktoria Sypucińska, Jakub Henke, Alan Kwieciński, Ewelina "Młoda" Bańkowska, Aleksandra Smoleń, Wojtek Gola, Bartek Barański, Kamila Widz and Piotr Kluk. Paweł "Trybson" Trybała also returned to the show as the boss. On 13 January 2019 it was announced that Marcin "Brzydal" Maruszak had quit the show and this is his last season.

== Cast ==
- Alan Kwieciński (Episodes 5–12)
- Aleksandra Smoleń (Episodes 7–9)
- Bartek Barański (Episode 11)
- Klaudia "Czaja" Czajkowska (Episodes 10–12)
- Damian Zduńczyk
- Ewelina Kubiak
- Filip Ćwiek
- Jakub Henke (Episodes 2–4)
- Julia Kruzer (Episodes 1–10)
- Kamila Widz (Episodes 11–12)
- Ewelina "Młoda" Bańkowska (Episode 7)
- Klaudia Stec
- Anna "Mała" Aleksandrzak
- Marcin "Brzydal" Maruszak (Episodes 1–11)
- Patryk Spiker
- Piotr Kluk (Episode 12)
- Piotr Polak
- Wiktoria Sypucińska (Episodes 2–5)
- Wojciech Gola (Episodes 9–10)

=== Duration of cast ===
Cast members	Series 10											
Cast members	1	2	3	4	5	6	7	8	9	10	11	12
Alan												
Aleksandra												
Bartek												
Czaja												
Damian												
Ewelina												
Filip												
Jakub												
Julia												
Kamila												
Klaudia												
Mała												
Marcin												
Młoda												
Patryk												
Piotr K												
Piotr P												
Wiktoria												
Wojciech												

=== Notes ===
Key: = "Cast member" is featured in this episode.
Key: = "Cast member" arrives in the house.
Key: = "Cast member" voluntarily leaves the house.
Key: = "Cast member" returns to the house.
Key: = "Cast member" leaves the series.
Key: = "Cast member" returns to the series.
Key: = "Cast member" returns and leaves the series in the same episode.
Key: = "Cast member" is removed from the series.
Key: = "Cast member" is not a cast member in this episode.

== Episodes ==
No. overall	No. in season	Title	Duration	Original release date	Polish viewers (thousands)
117	1	"Episode 1"	60 minutes	21 October 2018	N/A
The team arrives at the house in Łeba. Brzydal and Mała have broken up, but remain close friends. To celebrate the tenth season, there are murals featuring past and present cast members. Three new members join them: Julia, Patryk "Spiker", and Filip. From the very beginning Julia does not get along with the other girls. On the way to a club, a fight breaks out in their car. As a result, Spiker switches vehicles with Julia when they stop.
118	2	"Episode 2"	60 minutes	28 October 2018	N/A
Pedro and Brzydal make every effort to reconcile Julia with the rest of the girls. Klaudia approaches Filip, who does not remember her. The next morning the team meets their new boss, who will be... Trybson. The team will be working at their own bar. Meanwhile, Ptyś and Wiktoria visit the house.
119	3	"Episode 3"	60 minutes	4 November 2018	N/A
On the way to a club, Pedro tells his friends the details of his relationship with Laura. During the party, Ewelina, Wiktoria and Stifler organize a competition to check who has the deepest throat. Ewelina and Spiker deepen their friendship. Klaudia lands in bed with Filip while Jakub triggers a "ham" scandal.
120	4	"Episode 4"	60 minutes	11 November 2018	N/A
The big flamingo pulls the team out to the lake. However, a catamaran cruise on the sea is more conductive to fun. Spiker as a stylist agrees with Ewelina's taste. The elections of Miss Łeba arouse euphoria, which falls only in the bed.
121	5	"Episode 5"	60 minutes	18 November 2018	N/A
Alan arrives at the house. He reconnects with Mała during an evening at the club. Klaudia is annoyed when Filip takes a girl to the toilets. Meanwhile, Spiker gets closer with the girls and Ewelina fights with an anti fan.
122	6	"Episode 6"	60 minutes	25 November 2018	N/A
Pedro is worried about Stifler and decides to take him to the fortune-teller. The visit puts Stifler in a good mood, but fails to change his attitude toward a healthy lifestyle. The team decides to spend the evening together at home. Meanwhile, another joke of Brzydal unleashes the true male war between him and Alan.
123	7	"Episode 7"	60 minutes	2 December 2018	N/A
Młoda and Ola visit the house. The men are very fascinated with Ola's new appearance. At the bar, the team prepares a birthday surprise for Alan. Młoda gets into a fight with the group. She decides it is best for everyone if she leaves for good.
124	8	"Episode 8"	60 minutes	9 December 2018	N/A
After Alan’s birthday party, a hard morning comes. Trybson decides to arrange a talk with the group. The team arrives at the medieval village. They learn how the Slavs played well before the invention of the Internet. In the evening, the crew goes camping. Stifler learns that baking a chicken over a fire is not a simple task. Julia and Brzydal, who join the others after work, decide to play a prank. They dress up as bloody clowns.
125	9	"Episode 9"	60 minutes	16 December 2018	N/A
Wojtek visits the house and decides to play a prank on Stifler. For this purpose, he puts alcohol in a watermelon. Afterwards, the team takes part in a maze race. In the evening they go to a party. At the club, they are greeted by the girlfriends of Pedro and Brzydal. Wojtek loses his companions to alcohol.
126	10	"Episode 10"	60 minutes	6 January 2019	N/A
Julia receives devastating news from home and leaves right away. Later on Klaudia "Czaja" arrives at the house. Brzydal is sad when his girlfriend Angela has to go home. Stifler decides it's time to let loose during a night out. However, drinking a lot does not make him feel better. He gets into a fight with Ewelina, who is disappointed when Mała sides with Stifler.
127	11	"Episode 11"	60 minutes	13 January 2019	N/A
Brzydal misses Angela and feels lonely. He decides to leave the team. Kamila and Bartek visit the house. The group takes a trip on a fishing boat in Gdynia. At the club there is a lot of alcohol. During a fight with Klaudia, Alan's behaviour shocks the rest of the group.
128	12	"Episode 12"	60 minutes	20 January 2019	N/A
Trybson comes to the house to discuss the events of the previous night. While he is disappointed in Alan, it's up to the team whether they give him another chance or ask him to leave. They unanimously decide that he should be kicked out. The decision was based not only on recent events, but also his actions during previous seasons. Kamila, who has gotten close to Alan, decides to leave with him. Piotr Kluk visits the house. Before everyone goes home, there is a final party at the house.
