= Warsaw Shore series 20 =

Warsaw Shore
- Season 20
- No. of episodes: 13

Release
- Original network: MTV; Player international
- Original release: 17 March – 16 June 2024

Series chronology
- ← Previous; Series 19 Next → Series 21

The twentieth series of Warsaw Shore, a Polish television programme based in Warsaw, Poland was announced on September 29, 2023, and began airing on 17 March 2024. The series was filmed in between November and December 2023 mainly in Warsaw and also in Łódź. This is also the first series not to include Milena Łaszek, Michał Sarnowski and Przemysław "Sequento" Skulski after their departures the previous season. The series also featured the return of Jeremiasz "Jez" Szmigiel. It will be also the first series to include four new cast members Diana Mościcka, Grzesiek Tomaszewski, Magda Pawińska and Olaf Majewski. The series will feature the brief returns of former cast members Damian "Stifler" Zduńczyk, Kasjusz "Don Kasjo" Życiński, Radosław "Diva" Majchrowski, Kamil Jagielski, and original cast member Anna "Mała" Aleksandrzak. Nathan Henry of Geordie Shore made a guest appearance for the second time, after the thirteenth series.

== Cast ==
- Aleksandra "Ola" Okrzesik
- Angelika Kramer
- Anna "Mała" Aleksandrzak (Episode 11)
- Damian "Stifler" Zduńczyk (Episode 11)
- Diana Mościcka
- Radosław "Diva" Majchrowski (Episode 10)
- Grzesiek Tomaszewski
- Jeremiasz "Jez" Szmigiel
- Julia Kruzer (Episode 6-9)
- Kamil Jagielski (Episode 5-6)
- Kasjusz "Don Kasjo" Życiński (Episode 4-5, 12-13)
- Lena Majewska (Episode 1-8)
- Magda Pawińska
- Marcin "Mały" Pastuszka
- Mariusz "Śmietana" Śmietanowski (Episode 2-3)
- Olaf Majewski
- Patrycja Morkowska (Episode 5-9)
- Patryk Spiker
- Piotr "Piotrek" Nowakowski (Episode 5-6)
- Piotr "Pedro" Polak (Episode 5-7)
- Ronaldo "Czarny Polak" Miranda (Episode 5-6, 11-12)

=== Special guest ===
- Nathan Henry (Episodes 9–11)

=== Duration of cast ===
| Cast members | Series 20 | | | | | | | | | | | | |
| Cast members | 1 | 2 | 3 | 4 | 5 | 6 | 7 | 8 | 9 | 10 | 11 | 12 | 13 |
| Aleksandra | | | | | | | | | | | | | |
| Angelika | | | | | | | | | | | | | |
| Damian | | | | | | | | | | | | | |
| Diana | | | | | | | | | | | | | |
| Diva | | | | | | | | | | | | | |
| Grzesiek | | | | | | | | | | | | | |
| Jeremiasz | | | | | | | | | | | | | |
| Julia | | | | | | | | | | | | | |
| Kamil | | | | | | | | | | | | | |
| Kasjusz | | | | | | | | | | | | | |
| Lena | | | | | | | | | | | | | |
| Magda | | | | | | | | | | | | | |
| Mała | | | | | | | | | | | | | |
| Marcin | | | | | | | | | | | | | |
| Mariusz | | | | | | | | | | | | | |
| Olaf | | | | | | | | | | | | | |
| Patrycja | | | | | | | | | | | | | |
| Patryk | | | | | | | | | | | | | |
| Piotr N | | | | | | | | | | | | | |
| Piotr P | | | | | | | | | | | | | |
| Ronaldo | | | | | | | | | | | | | |

=== Notes ===
Key: = "Cast member" is featured in this episode.
Key: = "Cast member" arrives in the house.
Key: = "Cast member" voluntarily leaves the house.
Key: = "Cast member" leaves and returns to the house in the same episode.
Key: = "Cast member" returns to the house.
Key: = "Cast member" leaves the series.
Key: = "Cast member" returns to the series.
Key: = "Cast member" returns and leaves the series in the same episode.
Key: = "Cast member" does not feature in this episode.

== Episodes ==
| No. overall | No. in season | Title | Original release date | Viewers (millions) |
|---|---|---|---|---|
| 242 | 1 | "Episode 1" | 17 March 2024 | TBA |
Ready to celebrate the anniversary edition, the team reaches the colorful villa. The partygoers include new people and Jez and his snow-white smile.
| 243 | 2 | "Episode 2" | 24 March 2024 | TBA |
The club's dance floor is full of people dancing, the girls hug Jez and Mały hugs Magda. The team gets serious seeing the guests and the extreme attraction.
| 244 | 3 | "Episode 3" | 7 April 2024 | TBA |
In Ostrołęka the band will warm up the audience!. Spiker is horny for the honey cheese and Angelika is horny for Jez, who finally falls asleep in Grzesiek's arms.
| 245 | 4 | "Episode 4" | 14 April 2024 | TBA |
Don Kasjo joins the fun with the gang! The night is full of wild parties and scenes of jealousy. Mały guy is chased by a "kitten", and Jez's snow-white smile attracts not only Diana.
| 246 | 5 | "Episode 5" | 21 April 2024 | TBA |
Fun housewives will encourage the team to spend an unforgettable night and prepare a night party at home. Pedro arrives at the event directly from the playing field, expanding the group of veterans among the numerous guests.
| 247 | 6 | "Episode 6" | 28 April 2024 | TBA |
| 248 | 7 | "Episode 7" | 5 May 2024 | TBA |
A strong hangover and the announcement of punishments are echoes of an epic house party, and now it's time to perform real stunts. The wine tasting prepares the group for the upcoming party, but Jez suffers some painful karma. Lena spends the day in the arms of her new boyfriend.
| 249 | 8 | "Episode 8" | 12 May 2024 | TBA |
| 250 | 9 | "Episode 9" | 19 May 2024 | TBA |
While Olaf is thinking about a date, Nathan shows up at the house!. Some people feel their legs shaking, others are speechless: the BDSM night show works in a similar way and prepares the team for the party.
| 251 | 10 | "Episode 10" | 26 May 2024 | TBA |
A quiet morning in the company of alpacas turns into euphoria when seeing Diva, who takes the team to a colorful world of happiness and excitement. A friendship develops between Ola and Nathan.
| 252 | 11 | "Episode 11" | 2 June 2024 | TBA |
Grzegorz takes over the sex shop and Olaf puts a stormy end to his adventure. The team receives more Legends and says goodbye to Nathan.
| 253 | 12 | "Episode 12" | 9 June 2024 | TBA |
Working with a hangover can be a nightmare, but becoming a mermaid is a dream come true! From the underwater depths we jump onto the dance floor and Kasjo joins the party. Kasia's presence contributes to divisions and arguments.
| 254 | 13 | "Episode 13" | 16 June 2024 | TBA |
