= Warsaw Shore series 17 =

Warsaw Shore
- Season 17
- No. of episodes: 12 + 1 Special

Release
- Original network: MTV; Player international
- Original release: 18 September – 11 December 2022

Series chronology
- ← Previous; Series 16 Next → Series 18

The seventeenth series of Warsaw Shore, a Polish television programme based in Warsaw, Poland was announced in April 2022 and began airing on 18 September 2022. The series was filmed in Wrocław, making this the second series to be filmed there following the fifth series in 2016. The team took a trip to the Czech Republic and then returned to Wrocław, finally settling in Warsaw.This is also the first series not to include Daniel "Arnold" Jabłoński, Patrycja Morkowska, Radosław "Diva" Majchrowski, and the original member Ewelina Kubiak after their departures the previous season. It was also the first series to include five new cast members, Aleksandra Okrzesik, Przemysław "Sequento" Skulski, Wiktoria "Jaszczur" Robert, Dominik Gul and Małgorzata "Gosia" Jeziorowska. The series also featured the brief return of two former cast members Alan Kwieciński and Ewa Piekut. This was the final series to include cast members Jeremiasz "Jez" Szmigiel y Kamil Jagielsk.

== Cast ==
- Alan Kwieciński (Episodes 7–8)
- Aleksandra "Ola" Okrzesik
- Radosław "Diva" Majchrowski (Episodes 1–2, 7)
- Dominik Gul (Episode 1–2)
- Małgorzata "Gosia" Jeziorowska (Episodes 1–2)
- Jeremiasz "Jez" Szmigiel
- Kamil Jagielski
- Lena Majewska
- Milena Łaszek
- Oliwia Dziatkiewicz
- Patryk Spiker
- Michał "Sarna" Sarnowski
- Przemysław "Sequento" Skulski
- Wiktoria "Jaszczur" Robert

=== Duration of cast ===
Cast members	Series 17											
Cast members	1	2	3	4	5	6	7	8	9	10	11	12
Alan												
Aleksandra												
Diva												
Dominik												
Gosia												
Jeremiasz												
Kamil												
Lena												
Milena												
Oliwia												
Patryk												
Przemysław												
Sarna												
Wiktoria												

=== Notes ===
Key: = "Cast member" is featured in this episode.
Key: = "Cast member" arrives in the house.
Key: = "Cast member" voluntarily leaves the house.
Key: = "Cast member" returns to the house.
Key: = "Cast member" leaves the series.
Key: = "Cast member" returns to the series.
Key: = "Cast member" is removed from the series.
Key: = "Cast member" does not feature in this episode.

=== Off screen exits ===
- During the second episode, Jakub Henke the Boss announced that Dominik and Gosia had been removed from the house for breaking the rules, and would not be returning for the remainder of the series. This led to the eventual departure of Dominik and Gosia from the show.

== Episodes ==
No. overall	No. in season	Title	Original release date	Viewers (millions)
204	1	"Episode 1"	18 September 2022	TBA
On the way to the villa, emotions run high. The crew has a good feeling. There are five freshmen waiting at the venue! The roe deer finally joins the large group. A house near Wrocław has barely survived.
205	2	"Episode 2"	25 September 2022	TBA
The team is in a bubbly mood at their first party. The start of the season is not the only cause for celebration. The day after the melange is full of activity.
206	3	"Episode 3"	2 October 2022	TBA
Some are lazing around, others are cleaning. The dance cleaning service doesn't just have a good nose: as soon as Kamil shows up, the team takes an interest in Ola. Did Lena get discouraged? It's time to find out.
207	4	"Episode 4"	9 October 2022	TBA
Kamil's pranks lead to team tensions and yellow cards. A true lumberjack is not afraid of the axe. A shower for two is much more enjoyable than a dip in the pool, which results in testicular injuries.
208	5	"Episode 5"	16 October 2022	TBA
Jealousy can be dealt with at a distance, but in the fight for the sake of a friend, Jez prefers to spice it up with a worthy "dill". Serious talks are waiting for the team.
209	6	"Episode 6"	23 October 2022	TBA
A successful event brings new acquaintances. Kamil and Sarna fight for the favors of beautiful women, and Lena faces a love dilemma.
210	7	"Episode 7"	30 October 2022	TBA
When it's time for a house party, the villa comes to life. Alan will work with Olivia as an imam and Wictoria will face a test of loyalty. The announcer begins his own choreography, Lena experiences her drama, and Jez suddenly disappears.
211	8	"Episode 8"	6 November 2022	TBA
The male cats are loaded with rifles and ready for action! The ropes course will prove to be a challenge, and a test of knowledge and royal magic awaits the crew at the beach bar.
212	9	"Episode 9"	20 November 2022	TBA
Only a few can overcome fear and jump for dreams, but the whole team in crazy costumes is going to the party! It pays to be nice: Sequento wins Milena's heart.
213	10	"Episode 10"	27 November 2022	TBA
The team makes it all the way to the Czech Republic, where daydreaming takes on literal meaning. Dense environment and more yellow cards.
214	11	"Episode 11"	4 December 2022	TBA
215	12	"Episode 12"	11 December 2022	TBA
–	–	"Extra"	18 December 2022	TBA
