= Warsaw Shore series 14 =

Warsaw Shore
- Season 14
- No. of episodes: 12 + 1 Special

Release
- Original network: MTV; Player international
- Original release: 15 November 2020 – 7 February 2021

Series chronology
- ← Previous; Series 13 Next → Series 15

The fourteenth series of Warsaw Shore, a Polish television programme based in Warsaw, Poland was announced in July 2020 and will begin on 15 November 2020. The photos were taken in Warsaw, in compliance with all safety rules related to the COVID-19 pandemic. This was the first series not to include Anastasiya Yandaltsava, Gábor "Gabo" Szabó, and Marceli Szklanny after their departures the previous season. It was also the first series to include five new cast members Kinga Gondorowicz, Maciek Szczukiewicz, Daniel "Arnold" Jabłoński, Michał Eliszer and Paulina Karbowiak. Jakub "Ptyś" Henke returned to the show as the boss.

== Cast ==
- Damian "Dzik" Graf
- Daniel "Arnold" Jabłoński
- Radosław "Diva" Majchrowski
- Ewa Piekut
- Ewelina "Ewelona" Kubiak
- Joanna Bałdys
- Kasjusz "Don Kasjo" Życiński
- Kinga Gondorowicz
- Maciek Szczukiewicz
- Michał Eliszer
- Milena Łaszek
- Patryk Spiker
- Paulina Karbowiak
- Piotr "Pedro" Polak (Episodes 1–5)

=== Duration of cast ===
Cast members	Series 14											
Cast members	1	2	3	4	5	6	7	8	9	10	11	12
Damian												
Daniel												
Diva												
Ewa												
Ewelina												
Joanna												
Kasjusz												
Kinga												
Maciek												
Michał												
Milena												
Patryk												
Paulina												
Piotr												

=== Notes ===
Key: = "Cast member" is featured in this episode.
Key: = "Cast member" arrives in the house.
Key: = "Cast member" leaves the series.
Key: = "Cast member" is not a cast member in this episode.

== Episodes ==
No. overall	No. in season	Title	Original release date	Viewers (millions)
168	1	"Episode 1"	15 November 2020	TBA
The team arrives at the house, which looks very different. After the previous season, Ewelina left Marceli and reconciled with Dzik. New members Kinga and Maciek make a big impression on the entire team. Ptyś visits and announces that he is their new boss. Milena and Kinga have a fight after drinking too much.
169	2	"Episode 2"	22 November 2020	TBA
On the way to the club, Kinga flirts with Dzik. Ewa is jealous when she sees Ewelina talking to Maciek. Tensions come to a boil between the two girls. Pedro sleepwalks at night, causing a funny situation with Ewa and Diva. The next day Paulina arrives at the house. However, everyone is still recovering from the events of the previous night.
170	3	"Episode 3"	29 November 2020	TBA
As punishment, Milena and Kinga have to clean while the rest of the team has fun at the beach. Ptyś comes to give warnings and tell them about an upcoming attraction. Arnold arrives at the house. At the club Ewa and Maciek get closer, while Pedro misses his girlfriend.
171	4	"Episode 4"	6 December 2020	TBA
After a long night, Dzik wakes up outside. Ewa stays home with him while the rest of the team goes skydiving. Spiker and Paulina have the best luck while wake boarding. Ewelina and Arnold disappear together during a night out, leading to speculation among their friends. Pedro's girlfriend Laura surprises him.
172	5	"Episode 5"	13 December 2020	TBA
Pedro informs his friends that he will be leaving the team. Maciek considers leaving as well after a fight with Asia. However, he decides to stay. Ewa and Ewelina reconcile. After working at a barber shop with Spiker and Diva, Don Kasjo returns with a new hair style. Paulina leaves the show after seriously injuring her leg.
173	6	"Episode 6"	20 December 2020	TBA
Dzik's jealousy leads to another disagreement with Ewa. Don Kasjo and Maciek also have a fight. In the morning, Ptyś has a serious talk with the team. Ewelina and Arnold continue getting closer when they go to work together. The team goes on a camping trip.
174	7	"Episode 7"	27 December 2020	TBA
Love is in the air by the campfire. Kinga and Dzik end up in a tent together. Ewelina and Arnold share a kiss, while Ewa and Maciek finally get a chance to bond. Everybody is in a good mood until Ewa goes too far during a game. In the morning, Asia confides in Ewelina about what happened the previous night.
175	8	"Episode 8"	3 January 2021	TBA
A snake shows up at the house. While most of the team is scared, Kinga befriends their surprise guest. Ewelina confronts Spiker and Diva about their gossiping. Things get heated at the club. Maciek defends Diva when a fan offends him.
176	9	"Episode 9"	10 January 2021	TBA
Maciek gets very drunk during a party. Dzik gets very upset when Ewa refuses to rekindle their romance. Most of the team is amused, but Kinga feels sorry for him. The next morning new team member Michał arrives at the house.
177	10	"Episode 10"	17 January 2021	TBA
The team goes for a ride on electric bicycles. The fun ends when Milena and Asia have a collision. Michał unintentionally offends Diva and Milena. However, all is forgiven during a night at the club. Spiker and Ewa show off their talents while working at the car wash.
178	11	"Episode 11"	24 January 2021	TBA
Kinga is very jealous when Dzik flirts with another woman. Ewa and Ewelina resolve their feud. Don Kasjo arranges a romantic night in the sleep room for Ewa and Maciek. The team has a day of fun and pranks at the water park.
179	12	"Episode 12"	31 January 2021	TBA
The team hosts a large outdoor party to end the season. Maciek and Ewa decide to end their relationship. In the morning Arnold plays a prank on his sleeping roommates. Dzik apologizes to Kinga and they decide to be friends.
–	–	"Extra"	7 February 2021 (Player.pl)	TBA
The team reminisces about the season and shares some unaired moments.
