= Warsaw Shore series 15 =

Warsaw Shore
- Season 15
- No. of episodes: 12 + 1 Special

Release
- Original network: MTV; Player international
- Original release: 28 March – 27 June 2021

Series chronology
- ← Previous; Series 14 Next → Series 16

The fifteenth series of Warsaw Shore, a Polish television programme based in Warsaw, Poland was announced in February 2021 and began airing on 28 March 2021. The photos were taken in Warsaw, in compliance with all safety rules related to the COVID-19 pandemic. This is the first series not to include Ewelina Kubiak, Piotr Polak, Joanna Bałdys, Daniel "Arnold" Jabłoński, Paulina Karbowiak and Michał Eliszer after their departures the previous season. It will also be the first series to include six new cast members Oliwia Dziatkiewicz, Jeremiasz "Jez" Szmigiel, Lena Majewska, Dominik Raczkowski, Patrycja Morkowska and Kamil Jagielski. The series also featured the brief return of three former cast members Piotr Polak, Alan Kwieciński and Michał Eliszer. This was the final series to include cast members Damian "Dzik" Graf, Ewa Piekut, Kinga Gondorowicz, and Maciek Szczukiewicz.

== Cast ==
- Alan Kwieciński (Episode 8–12)
- Damian "Dzik" Graf (Episode 1–8)
- Radosław "Diva" Majchrowski
- Dominik Raczkowski (Episode 1–8)
- Ewa Piekut
- Jeremiasz "Jez" Szmigiel
- Kamil Jagielski
- Kasjusz "Don Kasjo" Życiński
- Kinga Gondorowicz
- Lena Majewska
- Maciek Szczukiewicz
- Michał Eliszer (Episode 10–12)
- Milena Łaszek
- Oliwia Dziatkiewicz
- Patrycja Morkowska
- Patryk Spiker
- Piotr Polak (Episode 7–8)

=== Duration of cast ===
Cast members	Series 15											
Cast members	1	2	3	4	5	6	7	8	9	10	11	12
Alan												
Damian												
Diva												
Dominik												
Ewa												
Jeremiasz												
Kamil												
Kasjusz												
Kinga												
Lena												
Maciek												
Michał												
Milena												
Oliwia												
Patrycja												
Patryk												
Piotr												

=== Notes ===
Key: = "Cast member" is featured in this episode.
Key: = "Cast member" arrives in the house.
Key: = "Cast member" returns to the house.
Key: = "Cast member" leaves the series.
Key: = "Cast member" returns to the series.
Key: = "Cast member" is removed from the series.
Key: = "Cast member" does not feature in this episode.

== Episodes ==
No. overall	No. in season	Title	Original release date	Viewers (millions)
180	1	"Episode 1"	28 March 2021	TBA
Six new team members arrive at the house. The party starts right away. Lena gets very drunk and tries to kiss Kamil. However, he is more interested in Oliwia. The current team is surprised by their new houseguests. Maciek is happy to reunite with his friend Dominik.
181	2	"Episode 2"	4 April 2021	TBA
The team receives a video call from Ewelina and Arnold. Ptyś reminds everybody that clubs are closed due to the pandemic. Therefore, all parties will take place at the house. Don Kasjo flirts with Patrycja. Dominik helps Milena and Diva when they find Kamil sleeping in their bed.
182	3	"Episode 3"	11 April 2021	TBA
Everyone is happy when Spiker arrives at the house. Kamil and Dominik impress during an art lesson. The team's cook participates at their party that evening. Jez and Lena have a disagreement. After another argument, Lena questions if she should go home.
183	4	"Episode 4"	18 April 2021	TBA
Diva convinces Lena to stay. Later she reconciles with Maciek. In the morning, Ptyś informs the team that their cook needs a day off. Therefore, Patrycja and Don Kasjo are in charge of the kitchen. The team receives a visit from the fortune teller.
184	5	"Episode 5"	25 April 2021	TBA
Oliwia flirts with a handsome singer. Jez gets very drunk and makes a mess in the bedroom. Diva and Maciek celebrate their birthdays. Ewa, Milena, Spiker, and Patrycja prepare a special cake for them. Dominik helps the girls with their presents.
185	6	"Episode 6"	9 May 2021	TBA
The birthday party for Diva and Maciek is a huge success. Oliwia and Dominik have a disagreement about Maciek's present. Kamil and Kinga get closer. Patrycja helps Don Kasjo after he drinks too much. The next day the team rides in monster trucks.
186	7	"Episode 7"	16 May 2021	TBA
Pole dancing stimulates the senses and creates new acquaintances. Pedro comes to visit, longing for team events. Dzik makes an important decision - his longing for his beloved is stronger than the will to play. Dominik goes too far when arguing with a guest. When confronted, he refuses to listen to the team. A distraught Kinga decides to contact Ptyś.
187	8	"Episode 8"	23 May 2021	TBA
It turns out that Dzik's departure is not the end of goodbyes. Ptyś asks Dominik to leave the team. There are also returns, but not everyone is happy to see Alan. This day shows who is really in shape. Kamil excels during the football game. In the evening, Oliwia flirts with Alan.
188	9	"Episode 9"	30 May 2021	TBA
The gossip turns into a conspiracy when Ewa reconciles with Alan. As the emotions subside, the boys form a "pot team". Horseback riding is only a warm-up. Jez helps the cook prepare a special drink for the crew's sleigh ride. A ceramics lesson reveals hidden talents.
189	10	"Episode 10"	6 June 2021	TBA
Buongiorno! Michał wakes up the crew after an all-night party. While everyone else takes part in the total demolition, Alan and Oliwia enjoy a romantic afternoon. In the evening, Spiker and Patrycja have a disagreement during a singing lesson. Sequins reign supreme when Sławomir comes to visit.
190	11	"Episode 11"	13 June 2021	TBA
Michał and Lena have a friendly competition during training. That evening the team visits a casino. Ewelona and Arnold pay a visit to check on their friends. Eventually Kasjo and Patrycja come to an agreement in the bedroom. Alan and Oliwia also strengthen their friendship.
191	12	"Episode 12"	20 June 2021	TBA
It's time for the last house party. There are guests including Julia and Don Kasjo's brother. While Don Kasjo hosts an unusual competition, Patrycja bonds with Lena. A cold swim cures the crew's morning hangover. That evening a farewell dinner takes place in the atmosphere of memories of the winter season.
–	–	"Extra"	27 June 2021	TBA
Cast members look back at Series 15.

== Controversy ==
On the second episode that aired April 4, 2021, cast member Maciek was shown as he masturbated next to Oliwia when she slept. This happened after she refused to have sex earlier. After being accused of sexual violence on social media, ViacomCBS Poland removed the scene shown. In addition, the episode was edited on the streaming platform Player where it had previously been published.
