= Warsaw Shore series 21 =

Warsaw Shore
- Season 21
- No. of episodes: 13

Release
- Original network: MTV; Player international
- Original release: 22 September – 22 December 2024

Series chronology
- ← Previous; Series 20

The twenty-first series of Warsaw Shore, a Polish television programme based in Warsaw, Poland was announced in July 2024, and began airing on 22 September 2024. The series was filmed in Szczecin and Berlin, Germany. This is also the first series not to include Lena Majewska, Magda Pawińska and Olaf Majewski after their departures the previous season. The series also featured the return of Oliwia Dziatkiewicz. It will be also the first series to include four new cast members Adam Mikołajczyk, Julita Izdebska, Łukasz Budyń and Michał Sewera. Original cast member Ewelina Kubiak returned to the show as the boss replacing Jakub "Ptyś" Henke. This was the final series to feature Patryk Spiker following his decision to quit the show. Bellydah Victoria and Fabio de Pasquale from Germany Shore appeared as special guests.

== Cast ==
- Adam Mikołajczyk
- Aleksandra "Ola" Okrzesik
- Angelika Kramer
- Diana Mościcka
- Grzesiek Tomaszewski
- Jeremiasz "Jez" Szmigiel
- Julia Kruzer (Episodes 5–6)
- Julita Izdebska
- Łukasz Budyń
- Marcin "Mały" Pastuszka
- Michał Sewera
- Oliwia Dziatkiewicz
- Patryk Spiker

=== Special guest ===
- Bellydah Victoria Badgal (Episodes 3–9)
- Fabio Pasquale (Episodes 3–9, 11)

=== Duration of cast ===
Cast members	Series 21												
Cast members	1	2	3	4	5	6	7	8	9	10	11	12	13
Adam													
Aleksandra													
Angelika													
Diana													
Grzesiek													
Jeremiasz													
Julia													
Julita													
Łukasz													
Marcin													
Michał													
Oliwia													
Patryk													

=== Notes ===
Key: = "Cast member" is featured in this episode.
Key: = "Cast member" arrives in the house.
Key: = "Cast member" voluntarily leaves the house.
Key: = "Cast member" returns to the house.
Key: = "Cast member" leaves the series.
Key: = "Cast member" returns to the series.
Key: = "Cast member" does not feature in this episode.

== Episodes ==
No. overall	No. in season	Title	Original release date	Viewers (millions)
255	1	"Episode 1"	22 September 2024	TBA
Szczecin welcomes the team of Warsaw Shore. It's time for crazy beach parties!. Emotions rise every time the doors of the fabulous villa open.
256	2	"Episode 2"	29 September 2024	TBA
The team started the season brilliantly: with a big party!
257	3	"Episode 3"	6 October 2024	TBA
The team recharge their batteries by the sea before the party, where the boys bravely put their plan into practice.
258	4	"Episode 4"	13 October 2024	TBA
In Berlin, a daring and high-profile trip awaits the team. Belly and Fabio join the adventure.
259	5	"Episode 5"	20 October 2024	TBA
Adam's courtship turns into a drama and Juliet's into a fruitful romance.
260	6	"Episode 6"	27 October 2024	TBA
This house party is a real fire! Luckily, Ola has her own firefighter and Belly has her own Bobson - you never know when you'll have to run to get water, which is literally boiling in the hot tub. Adam will definitely not forget this night, the rest will remember it thanks to their tattoos. Total freestyle!
261	7	"Episode 7"	3 November 2024	TBA
The team is resting after the house party, but Ewelona is not sleeping: it's time to clean up and fly through the sky! Grzegorz is close to love, and Michał and Angelika are in conflict again. Belly and Fabio's farewell is a mixture of sadness and joy, but unfortunately Bobson ruined it. It's going to be a difficult journey!
262	8	"Episode 8"	17 November 2024	TBA
It's not just the salt water that's cheering the team up: Adam's return is another cause for celebration, and the breaking of the female code is another cause for scandal. Painting male nudes and knocking them down helps to ease some emotions, but in Mielno another surprise awaits us.
263	9	"Episode 9"	24 November 2024	TBA
After a crazy fun in Mielno, it was time to say goodbye to Belly and Fabio.
264	10	"Episode 10"	1 December 2024	TBA
The Boss is putting things in order, but some details come to light that cause chaos. While the boys are staying together in the chill-out area at home, drama breaks out in the pub. After an intense night, yoga relaxes the atmosphere a bit and a special date awaits Oliwia.
265	11	"Episode 11"	8 December 2024	TBA
The Boss announces a big attraction and the survey is just an introduction to other emotions. Julita searches for Adam, Angelika tests Bobson and drama awaits the new relationship. A fashion show in Berlin full of music, dance and colors ends in heartbreak for Ola.
266	12	"Episode 12"	15 December 2024	TBA
Excitement, drama and goodbyes in Mielno! The penultimate event of the season, the last for Spiker. Angelika and Bobson have adventures, but love between Jez and Oliwia blossoms. The boys will enjoy a walk through the mud, while the girls will enjoy a prank and bad vibes.
267	13	"Episode 13"	22 December 2024	TBA
The final event was a real journey without limits. Sparks fly between Ola and Michał and Angela's jealousy takes its toll. Fortunately, Bobson keeps his fiery temper in check. Christmas morning and the last cruise put an end to an unforgettable and "divine" holiday!
