= Warsaw Shore: Summer Camp 3 series 8 =

Warsaw Shore: Summer Camp 3
- Season 8
- No. of episodes: 12

Release
- Original network: MTV; Player international
- Original release: 3 September – 19 November 2017

Series chronology
- ← Previous; Series 7: Winter Camp Next → Series 9

The eighth series of Warsaw Shore, a Polish television programme based in Warsaw, Poland was announced on 14 July 2017. The eighth season began airing on 3 September 2017. This was the first series not to include five former cast members Jakub Henke, Alan Kwieciński, Magda Pyznar, Klaudia Stec and Ewelina "Młoda" Bańkowska, and was the first to feature nine new cast members Jola Mróz, who had previously appeared during the first series of Ex on the Beach Poland as main cast member and second series as an ex-girlfriend of current cast member Piotr Polak, Anna "Andzia" Papierz, Bartek Barański, Ilona Borowska, Jacek Bystry, Kamila Widz, Marcin "Brzydal" Maruszak, Mariusz "Ryjek" Adam and Wiktoria Sypucińska. It also features the return of former original cast member Anna "Mała" Aleksandrzak who previously made exit during the previous series. The series also feature the show's 100th episode. Ahead of the series it was confirmed that the series would be filmed in Władysławowo.

== Cast ==
- Anna "Andzia" Papierz (Episodes 1–10)
- Bartek Barański
- Damian Zduńczyk
- Ewelina Kubiak
- Ilona Borowska (Episodes 1–3)
- Jacek Bystry
- Jola Mróz
- Kamila Widz (Episodes 1–4)
- Anna "Mała" Aleksandrzak (Episodes 8–12)
- Marcin "Brzydal" Maruszak
- Mariusz "Ryjek" Adam (Episodes 1–2)
- Piotr Polak
- Wiktoria Sypucińska
- Wojciech Gola

=== Duration of cast ===
Cast members	Series 8: Summer Camp 3											
Cast members	1	2	3	4	5	6	7	8	9	10	11	12
Andzia												
Bartek												
Damian												
Ewelina												
Ilona												
Jacek												
Jola												
Kamila												
Mała												
Marcin												
Ryjek												
Piotr												
Wiktoria												
Wojciech												

=== Notes ===
Key: = "Cast member" is featured in this episode.
Key: = "Cast member" arrives in the house.
Key: = "Cast member" voluntarily leaves the house.
Key: = "Cast member" returns to the house.
Key: = "Cast member" leaves the series.
Key: = "Cast member" returns to the series.
Key: = "Cast member" is not a cast member in this episode.

== Episodes ==
No. overall	No. in season	Title	Duration	Original release date	Polish viewers (thousands)
93	1	"Episode 1"	60 minutes	3 September 2017	N/A
The team arrives in Władysławowo for the third summer camp. Stifler, Piotr, and Ewelina know that there will be new faces. Piotr's ex-girlfriend Jola surprises them at the beach. Eight new members arrive at the house, followed by Wojtek. Jacek the boss tells them that only a few of the new members will become permanent.
94	2	"Episode 2"	60 minutes	10 September 2017	N/A
Ryjek's party tricks fail to impress the rest of the team. Jacek and Jola get into a big fight. The team has their first night out. Several of them get sick after drinking too much. Jola and Brzydal spend a lot of time in the sleep room. Ryjek feels unappreciated and leaves the house in the middle of the night. Jacek the boss visits for a serious talk.
95	3	"Episode 3"	60 minutes	17 September 2017	N/A
Jacek and Jola receive a punishment for their aggressive behaviour. The veterans decide that Ilona will be the next to leave. Jacek tells the other boys about his special talent. Kamila tries to get Stifler's attention. Bartek and Ewelina have fun in the car, to Jacek's annoyance. Wojtek and Wiktoria go to the sleep room.
96	4	"Episode 4"	60 minutes	24 September 2017	N/A
Kamila learns that she will be leaving. The team goes to a club in Łeba. Wojtek stays home to take care of Wiktoria, who is not feeling well. Ewelina takes Bartek to the toilets, where they are interrupted by Brzydal. Jola is very upset when Andzia kisses Piotr. The next day Andzia, Jola, Piotr, Brzydal and Ewelina go to work at a kebab stand.
97	5	"Episode 5"	60 minutes	1 October 2017	N/A
The team is relieved to learn there won't be more eliminations. They go to a club in Sopot where Piotr and Jola rekindle their romance. Ewelina gives Brzydal some love advice. Wojtek is jealous when Wiktoria dances with Stifler. On the way home Jola is annoyed when Piotr falls asleep while Wojtek and Wiktoria have fun in the backseat. Jacek and Stifler deepen their friendship, leading to speculation among the rest of the team.
98	6	"Episode 6"	60 minutes	8 October 2017	N/A
In the morning Jola regrets sleeping with Piotr. The team goes to a farm where they learn about ostrich eggs. Emotions run high at the club. Jola and Piotr get into a big fight after she kisses Stifler. Later she argues with Brzydal. Wojtek is furious after Jacek kisses a drunk Stifler. Jola decides to leave the house.
99	7	"Episode 7"	60 minutes	15 October 2017	N/A
A difficult morning comes after the eventful night. Piotr learns about Jola's departure. Wojtek, Stifler, Ewelina, and Bartek go to work on the beach. On the way they discuss Stifler's sexuality. Wojtek apologizes to Jacek for his aggression. Jola returns to the house.
100	8	"Episode 8"	60 minutes	22 October 2017	N/A
Mała returns to the team. While the veterans are all happy, there are mixed reactions from the new members. Jola, Jacek, Bartek, and Brzydal are excited, while Wiktoria and Andzia are not pleased. The team goes to a water park where Jacek and Stifler continue bonding. Jola is jealous when Mała befriends Brzydal. Stifler prepares a smelly prank for his friends.
101	9	"Episode 9"	60 minutes	29 October 2017	N/A
Ewelina gets up close and personal with a few parrots. The team gets a lesson from their DJ friend. The boys put a horse statue in the girls' bedroom when they are not home. Bartek is annoyed when girls want to talk to Ewelina instead of him. Later he injures his leg on the dance floor.
102	10	"Episode 10"	60 minutes	5 November 2017	N/A
Bartek learns that he fractured his leg. The team goes sightseeing in Gdańsk where they visit the famous Neptune fountain. Piotr faces his fear of snakes. Andzia decides to leave the team. The rest of the team finds her parting letter when they return from the club.
103	11	"Episode 11"	60 minutes	12 November 2017	N/A
Mała and Ewelina decide to reconcile. The team comes home to a surprise: customized suitcases. Later they have a barbecue where Brzydal has trouble opening the champagne bottle. During a night out in Gdynia Stifler and Wojtek end up in a fountain.
104	12	"Episode 12"	60 minutes	19 November 2017	N/A
Ptyś visits the house. The team prepares for the house party. Brzydal runs into a problem when Piotr kicks him out of the sleep room. Ewelina is jealous of Bartek's friend. Wiktoria and Wojtek decide to end their relationship. Ptyś realizes that his partying days are over.
