= Warsaw Shore series 12 =

Polish television programme

Warsaw Shore
- Season 12
- No. of episodes: 13

Release
- Original network: MTV; Player international
- Original release: 22 September – 22 December 2019

Series chronology
- ← Previous; Series 11 Next → Series 13

The twelfth series of Warsaw Shore, a Polish television programme based in Warsaw, Poland was announced in July 2019 and began airing on 22 September 2019. The series was filmed in Mielno, making this the second series to be filmed there following the sixth series in 2016. This is the first series not to include two former cast members Klaudia "Czaja" Czajkowska and Klaudia Stec who had quit the show after the previous series and the first to include six new cast members Hungarian celebrity Gábor "Gabo" Szabó, Joanna Bałdys, Paweł Hałabuda, Anna Tokarska, Radosław "Diva" Majchrowski and Sasha Muzheiko, who had previously appeared on the sixth series of Top Model. The series also featured the brief return of Jakub Henke and Wojciech Gola. This was the final series to include cast member Damian "Stifler" Zduńczyk following his decision to quit. It was also later announced that this would be Anna "Mała" Aleksandrzak's last series.

== Cast ==
- Aleksandr "Sasha" Muzheiko (Episodes 8–13)
- Anastasiya Yandaltsava
- Anna "Mała" Aleksandrzak
- Anna Tokarska (Episodes 4–12)
- Damian "Dzik" Graf
- Damian "Stifler" Zduńczyk
- Ewa Piekut
- Ewelina Kubiak
- Gábor "Gabo" Szabó
- Jakub Henke
- Joanna Bałdys
- Kasjusz "Don Kasjo" Życiński
- Patryk Spiker
- Paweł Hałabuda
- Piotr Polak
- Radosław "Diva" Majchrowski (Episodes 4–13)
- Wojciech Gola (Episodes 11–12)

=== Duration of cast ===
Cast members	Series 12												
Cast members	1	2	3	4	5	6	7	8	9	10	11	12	13
Aleksandr													
Anastasiya													
Anna													
Damian G													
Damian Z													
Diva													
Ewa													
Ewelina													
Gabo													
Jakub													
Joanna													
Kasjusz													
Mała													
Patryk													
Paweł													
Piotr													
Wojciech													

=== Notes ===
Key: = "Cast member" is featured in this episode.
Key: = "Cast member" arrives in the house.
Key: = "Cast member" voluntarily leaves the house.
Key: = "Cast member" returns to the house.
Key: = "Cast member" leaves the series.
Key: = "Cast member" returns to the series.
Key: = "Cast member" is not a cast member in this episode.
Key: = "Cast member" features in this episode as a guest.

== Episodes ==
No. overall	No. in season	Title	Original release date	Viewers (millions)
142	1	"Episode 1"	22 September 2019	TBA
The team arrives in Mielno. Newly single Anastasiya has an awkward reunion with Stifler, who leaves for a body building competition. Ewelina's friends approve of her new figure. Jacek says they will be visited by potential new members. Asia and Paweł come soon after. That evening Hungarian celebrity Gabo arrives and makes a big impression on the girls.
143	2	"Episode 2"	29 September 2019	TBA
The team has an eventful first night out. Anastasiya and Asia become good friends. Paweł gets very sick after drinking too much. Ewa is annoyed when Dzik dances with another woman right after kissing her. Ewelina is conflicted about her attraction to Gabo. Stifler returns to the team.
144	3	"Episode 3"	6 October 2019	TBA
During a night out, Gabo is in a bad mood until Mała and Spiker save the day. Stifler is too tired to party after his travels. Don Kasjo is the victor of a competition held by the girls. The team goes paint balling. Jacek tells the team that Asia and Paweł will be leaving.
145	4	"Episode 4"	20 October 2019	TBA
Ewelina has an accident. Two newcomers arrive at the house. Diva quickly befriends the entire team. Pedro bonds with Anna at the club. Dzik's jealousy goes too far, leaving Ewa in tears. Mała's attempt to resolve their quarrel backfires. Gabo tries to figure out who stole his food.
146	5	"Episode 5"	27 October 2019	TBA
The team goes to a western fair in Kołobrzeg, where Anna impresses the team while horseback riding. Gabo invites Mała on a friendly date. Don Kasjo and Diva have an argument at the club, while Gabo has trouble communicating. Back at the house, the girls catch Dzik and Pedro with women. Anastasiya loses her temper when she learns the sleep room is occupied.
147	6	"Episode 6"	3 November 2019	TBA
Diva and Ewelina receive a difficult and smelly punishment for their laziness. Spiker and Mała awake to a chicken in their bedroom. Dzik impresses the other boys at the gym. Don Kasjo and Pedro decide to play a prank. The team receives a visit from singer Miły Pan. Anastasiya and Anna bond during a night out.
148	7	"Episode 7"	10 November 2019	TBA
The girls argue on the way home. The conflict escalates at the house where Ewelina violently confronts Anna. Mała and Ewa side with Ewelina, while Anna finds support from Anastasiya. Don Kasjo has a successful night. He celebrates by teaming up with Pedro to play a prank. Spiker tries to educate Gabo about Polish food.
149	8	"Episode 8"	17 November 2019	TBA
Jacek informs the group that Anna and Diva will stay. He also says there will be a new visitor. Don Kasjo's friend Sasha arrives at the house. Ptyś visits the house and notices that Stifler has changed. They have a serious conversation about his future with the team.
150	9	"Episode 9"	24 November 2019	TBA
Stifler invites the team to dinner, where he tells them he is leaving. They are shocked, but accept his decision. Gabo and Sasha have a great night at the club, while Anastasiya is sad about Stifler's departure. Diva and Don Kasjo bond on the dance floor. Pedro invites a girl to the team's amusement park trip.
151	10	"Episode 10"	1 December 2019	TBA
At a party Dzik only has eyes for Ewa. She makes it clear that their romance is over. Mała and Ewelina drink too many kamikazes. Don Kasjo defends Diva from anti-fans. Ewelina is not pleased to find Anastasiya sleeping in her bed. The team rides race cars in Koszalin. Dzik and Don Kasjo host a silly contest, complete with a unique trophy.
152	11	"Episode 11"	8 December 2019	TBA
Emotions run high during a night out. Gabo flirts with Ewa and Dzik insults her. Don Kasjo tries to give him advice. Dzik decides it is best to leave the team. Mała finds the situation amusing, which causes a fight with Ewa and Ewelina. In the morning, everybody resolves their quarrels. However, Mała decides it is time for her to leave. She has an emotional farewell with her friends. The team's spirits are lifted when Wojtek visits them.
153	12	"Episode 12"	15 December 2019	TBA
At the club, Anna's talents impress Wojtek. Don Kasjo is still sad about Dzik leaving. After Ewa rejects Gabo, he rekindles a romance from the gym. Asia and Paweł come to the house party. One guest insults Asia, which leads to a big fight. Sasha argues with Anastasiya. Spiker and Diva go to bed early. Pedro and Anna have accidents and go to the hospital.
154	13	"Episode 13"	22 December 2019 (Player.pl)	TBA
The team reunites in Warsaw. Gabo gives them a special welcome. Jacek informs them that he chose which of their visitors will become permanent. Asia and Diva are the lucky ones. The team goes to a party, where Ewa and Gabo deepen their friendship. The next day Ewelina invites the team to watch her take part in a wrestling match.
