= Warsaw Shore series 2 =

Warsaw Shore
- Season 2
- No. of episodes: 13

Release
- Original network: MTV
- Original release: 20 April – 13 July 2014

Series chronology
- ← Previous; Series 1 Next → Series 3

The second series of Warsaw Shore, a Polish television programme based in Warsaw, began airing on 20 April 2014 on MTV at Easter. The series concluded on 13 July 2014 after 13 episodes. The series was confirmed on 10 February 2014. This was the first series to feature new cast members Jakub Henke, Alan Kwieciński, Alicja Herodzińska and Malwina Pycka. This was the final series featuring Paweł Trybała and Eliza Wesołowska, who appeared only on the first episode of Series 2 due to Eliza's pregnancy.

== Cast ==
- Alan Kwieciński (Episodes 2–13)
- Alicja Herodzińska (Episodes 2–6)
- Anna Ryśnik
- Eliza Wesołowska (Episode 1)
- Ewelina Kubiak
- Jakub Henke
- Malwina Pycka (Episodes 7–13)
- Anna "Mała" Aleksandrzak
- Paweł Cattaneo
- Paweł "Trybson" Trybała (Episode 1)
- Wojciech Gola

=== Duration of cast ===
Cast members	Series 2												
Cast members	1	2	3	4	5	6	7	8	9	10	11	12	13
Alan													
Alicja													
Anna													
Eliza													
Ewelina													
Jakub													
Malwina													
Mała													
Paweł													
Trybson													
Wojciech													

=== Notes ===
Key: = "Cast member" is featured in this episode.
Key: = "Cast member" arrives in the house.
Key: = "Cast member" voluntarily leaves the house.
Key: = "Cast member" returns to the house.
Key: = "Cast member" features in this episode, but is outside of the house.
Key: = "Cast member" leaves the series.
Key: = "Cast member" is not a cast member in this episode.

== Episodes ==
No. overall	No. in season	Title	Duration	Original release date	Polish viewers (thousands)
12	1	"Episode 1"	60 minutes	20 April 2014	69,130
The group reunites at their new house. Jakub "Ptyś" joins the team. Eliza and Trybson have big news: they are together and she is pregnant. Therefore, they will not be staying at the house and leave the next day.
13	2	"Episode 2"	60 minutes	27 April 2014	88,906
Following the departure of Eliza and Trybson, new members Alicja and Alan arrive. The group has their first night out. Ewelina acts out when Paweł wants to take a girl home. Later she is injured and goes to the hospital. In the morning, Ptyś is surprised to wake up next to Mała.
14	3	"Episode 3"	60 minutes	4 May 2014	213,912
The group goes to a gym. At the pool, the boys run around naked. Wojtek runs into a friend at the club. She and Paweł have a mutual attraction. Ewelina resorts to desperate measures to ensure Paweł will not go to bed with another woman.
15	4	"Episode 4"	60 minutes	11 May 2014	205,843
Ewelina and Mała want to get along with the guys. The group goes spray tanning, with mixed results. Wojtek becomes the victim of another joke that requires him to keep cold blood. Anna's feelings for Alan are getting stronger.
16	5	"Episode 5"	60 minutes	18 May 2014	N/A
Ptyś decides to take revenge on a prankster. Alicja gradually loses her temper. Working together at the car wash brings Alan and Anna even closer together. Later on Alan leaves to take part a wrestling event in Croatia.
17	6	"Episode 6"	60 minutes	25 May 2014	N/A
Surprise guests come to the house. The team is asked to prepare dinner for somebody important. It's Mariusz Pudzianowski who gives them some life advice. Alicja's boyfriend visits and convinces her to go home with him.
18	7	"Episode 7"	60 minutes	1 June 2014	N/A
Malwina arrives at the house. The group travels to Poznań for a fun night at the club. Anna's loyalty is tested when she is tempted by attractive people. Meanwhile in Croatia Alan's competition takes place. Despite an intimidating opponent, he is victorious.
19	8	"Episode 8"	60 minutes	8 June 2014	N/A
Ewelina chooses Paweł to accompany her on the helicopter ride. Wojtek tries to play a prank on Ptyś, but is caught in the act. Alan returns to the group. He is immediately caught in a love triangle with Mała and Anna. Żaneta tells the group they will be taking a bartending class.
20	9	"Episode 9"	60 minutes	15 June 2014	224,777
Anna is more and more jealous of Alan. The men are fascinated by exotic dancers at a club. Malwina and Mała decide they should have their own fun and invite strippers to the home. Mała explains the case of "pathology" in connection with boys.
21	10	"Episode 10"	60 minutes	22 June 2014	N/A
The first house party takes place. Tensions come to a boil and Anna and Alan have an argument about his connection with Mała. The next day everyone shops for costumes to wear to a party. Anna is not feeling well and stays home. Everyone enjoys their new job at a burger restaurant.
22	11	"Episode 11"	60 minutes	29 June 2014	N/A
Things get heated at the costume party. Ptyś injures his foot and goes to the hospital. Mała gets into a fight when somebody insults her. Paweł reunites with Wojtek's attractive friend. At home there is another argument between the two men. Paweł and Ewelina rekindle their romance.
23	12	"Episode 12"	60 minutes	6 July 2014	N/A
The team travels to a club in Wrocław. After a long night of partying, everyone falls asleep in the bus. When they wake up, they are surprised to realize they are in another country. They arrive at a hotel then visit a sex museum.
24	13	"Episode 13"	60 minutes	13 July 2014	N/A
After a day of site-seeing in Prague it's time to eat. Language barriers cause confusion at the restaurant. When the team returns to Warsaw, they visit the burger restaurant for the last time. In the morning it is time to pack, say goodbye, and go home.
