= Warsaw Shore: Winter Camp series 7 =

Season of television series

Warsaw Shore: Winter Camp
- Season 7
- No. of episodes: 12

Release
- Original network: MTV; Player international
- Original release: 26 February – 21 May 2017

Series chronology
- ← Previous; Series 6: Summer Camp Next → Series 8: Summer Camp

The seventh series of Warsaw Shore, a Polish television programme based in Warsaw, Poland was announced on 20 January 2017. The seventh season began airing on 26 February 2017. This was the first series not to include Aleksandra Smoleń, who left the show at the end of the previous series. On 14 February 2017 it was announced that three former cast members Alan Kwieciński, Ewelina Kubiak and Klaudia Stec returned to the show. Ahead of the series it was confirmed that the series would be filmed in Zakopane.

== Cast ==
- Alan Kwieciński
- Damian Zduńczyk
- Ewelina Kubiak
- Jakub Henke
- Klaudia Stec
- Magda Pyznar
- Anna "Mała" Aleksandrzak (Episodes 1–10)
- Ewelina "Młoda" Bańkowska
- Piotr Polak
- Wojciech Gola

=== Duration of cast ===
Cast members	Series 7: Winter Camp											
Cast members	1	2	3	4	5	6	7	8	9	10	11	12
Alan												
Damian												
Ewelina												
Jakub												
Klaudia												
Magda												
Mała												
Młoda												
Piotr												
Wojciech												

=== Notes ===
Key: = "Cast member" is featured in this episode.
Key: = "Cast member" arrives in the house.
Key: = "Cast member" voluntarily leaves the house.
Key: = "Cast member" leaves and returns to the house in the same episode.
Key: = "Cast member" returns to the house.
Key: = "Cast member" leaves the series.
Key: = "Cast member" returns to the series.
Key: = "Cast member" does not feature in this episode.
Key: = "Cast member" is not officially a cast member in this episode.

== Episodes ==
No. overall	No. in season	Title	Duration	Original release date	Polish viewers (thousands)
81	1	"Episode 1"	60 minutes	26 February 2017	122 363
The team boards a train headed to Zakopane. After Stifler's relationship ended, he became Piotr's roommate. Ptyś reveals that he has a girlfriend. Everybody loves the luxurious house. They also notice there is space for three more people. Klaudia, Alan, and Ewelina return to the show.
82	2	"Episode 2"	60 minutes	5 March 2017	120 072
The team receives a visit from their new boss Michał. He teaches them about Goral culture and asks them to form two groups. The team with the most points will get a reward. Alan and Ptyś are chosen as leaders. During a ski trip, Ewelina injures her finger. Młoda and Klaudia go to work at a restaurant. The team goes to a club. Ewelina gets very drunk and fights with most of the team. Eventually Stifler calms her down.
83	3	"Episode 3"	60 minutes	12 March 2017	114 752
The hungover team members don't remember much of the previous night. Michał has a serious talk with the group about their aggression. As punishment, Ewelina, Młoda, and Piotr have to clean a restaurant. At a club Magda runs into her ex-boyfriend.
84	4	"Episode 4"	60 minutes	19 March 2017	133 300
Wojtek is still annoyed with Damian over his prank. The team goes snow tubing then receives skiing lessons. At the club Młoda fights with the other girls. Piotr acknowledges his feelings for Magda when they are in bed. Ewelina has to get creative to avoid an admirer. Młoda starts packing her bags.
85	5	"Episode 5"	60 minutes	26 March 2017	132 777
Młoda tells the team she misses her boyfriend Jarek and will leave right away. Mała supports her while everyone else tries to change her mind. Eventually they accept her decision. Ewelina apologizes for their earlier fight. The next day, Ptyś's team decides to choose a new leader. Stifler wins the vote and leads his team to victory in a snow labyrinth competition.
86	6	"Episode 6"	60 minutes	2 April 2017	125 119
Ptyś and Wojtek play a prank on the girls with Piotr's ice sculpture. Mała tries to get revenge with a bucket of snow. Alan's team wins in a difficult outdoor obstacle challenge. Wojtek and Alan find eggs in their beds. The team learns a Goral dance. Everyone has fun until Stifler is injured.
87	7	"Episode 7"	60 minutes	9 April 2017	70 665
At the hospital Stifler is diagnosed with a sprained ankle and must wear a cast. The entire team comes together to care for him and lift his spirits. Somebody insults Klaudia at the club. Magda and Mała come to her defence. Piotr switches teams, to Alan's annoyance. The group goes to Kraków.
88	8	"Episode 8"	60 minutes	16 April 2017	74 215
During a night out, Piotr accidentally spills juice on the entire team. Magda decides to break up with him. Meanwhile Stifler wants to sleep with his friend Marzena. Unfortunately, she disappoints him when he takes her to the house. Klaudia saves the day when the Maluch catches fire.
89	9	"Episode 9"	60 minutes	23 April 2017	111 406
Klaudia learns that she will get a reward for her bravery. Stifler takes Marzena to a restaurant for a romantic dinner. The team visits a mine in Katowice, where they take part in a difficult challenge. Stifler and Ewelina stay behind at the bar. Ptyś reunites with his girlfriend Oliwia.
90	10	"Episode 10"	60 minutes	7 May 2017	43 617
Ptyś does not want to be separated from Oliwia any longer. He decides to leave the team and tells them at the club. The other members are sad but supportive. Meanwhile Piotr has his last adventure in a club toilet. Back in Zakopane, Mała is unusually quiet and serious. She admits that she is in love and really misses her boyfriend. She has an emotional farewell with the team.
91	11	"Episode 11"	60 minutes	14 May 2017	78 438
Piotr is annoyed when he fails a sobriety test and can't go skiing. Klaudia and Ewelina draw on Stifler's cast. A stand-up comedian visits the house. Klaudia gives her reward to Magda and Piotr. They rekindle their romance during the spa date.
92	12	"Episode 12"	60 minutes	21 May 2017	77 943
Wojtek wakes up next to Marzena. Stifler politely tells her that their romance is over. The team hosts the last house party. Młoda and Ptyś come with Jarek and Oliwia. Alan wants to beat up Stifler after he threw a water balloon. Ptyś protects him, but becomes Alan's new target. Klaudia and Młoda prevent Stifler from getting involved. Magda and Piotr make a difficult decision about their relationship. The next morning the team reminisces about Winter Camp.
