= Warsaw Shore series 3 =

Warsaw Shore
- Season 3
- No. of episodes: 16 + 2 Specials

Release
- Original network: MTV
- Original release: 29 March – 4 October 2015

Series chronology
- ← Previous; Series 2 Next → Series 4: Summer Camp

The third series of Warsaw Shore, a Polish television programme based in Warsaw, began airing on 29 March 2015 on MTV. The series concluded on 4 October 2015 after 16 episodes and two special episodes The Trybson's. The series was confirmed on 23 January 2015. This was the first series to feature new cast members Magda Pyznar and Damian Zduńczyk. The series featured a former cast members Paweł Trybała and Eliza Wesołowska, who returned of the show as guests. During the third series, on 9 June 2015, it was confirmed there will be a new show with Eliza and Trybson, former cast members from Series 1 of Warsaw Shore called Warsaw Shore: Watch with Trybsons. The series premiere of the show aired on June 21, 2015 replacing Warsaw Shore after 12 episodes. The rest of season 3 episodes aired on 30 August 2015. This was the last series to feature Paweł Cattaneo, who has been axed from the show after party at a house. Ewelina Kubiak also left the show. On 6 September 2015, it was confirmed that new cast member Klaudia Stec had joined the cast in episode 14 of the series 3.

== Cast ==
- Alan Kwieciński
- Anna Ryśnik
- Damian Zduńczyk
- Eliza Wesołowska (Episodes 12–14)
- Ewelina Kubiak
- Klaudia Stec (Episodes 14–16)
- Magda Pyznar
- Anna "Mała" Aleksandrzak
- Paweł Cattaneo
- Paweł "Trybson" Trybała (Episodes 12–14)
- Wojciech Gola

=== Duration of cast ===
Cast members	Series 3															
Cast members	1	2	3	4	5	6	7	8	9	10	11	12	13	14	15	16
Alan																
Anna																
Damian																
Eliza																
Ewelina																
Klaudia																
Magda																
Mała																
Paweł																
Trybson																
Wojciech																

=== Notes ===
Key: = Cast member is featured in this episode.
Key: = Cast member arrives in the house.
Key: = Cast member leaves the series.
Key: = Cast member returns to the series.
Key: = Cast member is removed from the series.
Key: = Cast member is not a cast member in this episode.

== Episodes ==
No. overall	No. in season	Title	Duration	Original release date	Polish viewers (thousands)
25	1	"Episode 1"	60 minutes	29 March 2015	85,615
The team has two new members. Magda immediately gets close with Alan. She also becomes friends with a grateful Mała, who had a falling out with Ewelina. Damian is handsome but naive. He makes an ambitious bet with Paweł.
26	2	"Episode 2"	60 minutes	5 April 2015	92,260
A heavy morning comes after a crazy night. Damian wakes up in the sleeping room next to a girl. The group meet their serious new boss Jacek. Magda is in her element, using her dancing skills to lead the team during a salsa course.
27	3	"Episode 3"	60 minutes	12 April 2015	129,511
Anna decides to pack her suitcases, but changes her mind about leaving. Ewelina and Mała are forced to go to work together at a hair salon. After a night out Damian uses his meter again. The group are also witnesses of a fight.
28	4	"Episode 4"	60 minutes	19 April 2015	N/A
The group takes part in a volleyball match. During an evening at home, mysterious phone calls and flickering lights frighten the girls. Paweł and Wojtek fill two whips. Meanwhile, Mała teaches Damian how to be beautiful.
29	5	"Episode 5"	60 minutes	26 April 2015	N/A
Anna hears a surprising declaration of love from Damian. Magda is stressed out when she discovers that she is starting to have feelings for Alan. Ptyś surprises the group at a club event, to the delight of his former housemates.
30	6	"Episode 6"	60 minutes	3 May 2015	N/A
The team has a wild night out. Damian uses the clicker again. Meanwhile Paweł and Ewelina end up together on the couch. Anna feels the consequences of not going to work. She disagrees with the boss about his decision, but accepts that she will not change his mind.
31	7	"Episode 7"	60 minutes	10 May 2015	N/A
The boys team up to play the biggest prank yet. When the girls come home, they realize that all of their things are not where they are supposed to be. A fight breaks out and the boys lock themselves in the girls' room. In the end Anna breaks the door down.
32	8	"Episode 8"	60 minutes	17 May 2015	N/A
Magda ends up in the refrigerator after a night of drinking. Damian's alter ego "Stifler" emerges when he is partying at the club. A beautiful artist visits the house. The team learns that they will be making a painting with their bodies. They get very creative and messy.
33	9	"Episode 9"	60 minutes	24 May 2015	N/A
The team goes to an amusement park. Everyone has fun until Magda and Damian get sick. Later they go to the fortune-teller. Some do not believe in it, while others are completely convinced. Ewelina asks about her romance with Paweł. The next day Wojtek, Alan, and Ewelina go to work at a sushi restaurant.
34	10	"Episode 10"	60 minutes	31 May 2015	N/A
There is a party at the house with friends and fans. Alan upsets both Anna and Magda. The latter decides to get revenge by pouring water on his bed. Alan is very angry when he finds out. His rage wakes up Wojtek and his girlfriend. The next day everyone participates in a military themed competition, with surprising results.
35	11	"Episode 11"	60 minutes	7 June 2015	148,901
The group goes to the spa, where Paweł pulls a prank during the massages. Alan is remorseful and tries to reconcile with the rest of the group. At a club, Damian is attracted to a woman with a strong personality. Unfortunately things do not go as planned when he brings her to the house.
36	12	"Episode 12"	60 minutes	14 June 2015	121,755
Eliza visits and tells the group she is engaged to Trybson. Everyone is excited to see her except for Ewelina and Paweł. Mała, Magda, Anna, and Wojtek help Eliza choose a wedding dress. Somebody accidentally starts a fire in the yard, resulting in a chaotic night. The next day the group goes to Toruń to watch Trybson take part in a wrestling event.
37	13	"Episode 13"	60 minutes	30 August 2015	N/A
There is a party at a club to celebrate Trybson's victory. Alan is interested in a female friend of Paweł's, leading to tension between the two men. Back at the house, a photo collage of beautiful women fascinates the group. They take another trip to an event in Sopot where they are greeted by Malwina.
38	14	"Episode 14"	60 minutes	6 September 2015	224,777
Jacek says that there will be a change in the group. Everybody starts worrying that somebody will leave. Wojtek is the victim of a mysterious prankster. The group comes home to find a new member in the house. Klaudia joins the team.
39	15	"Episode 15"	60 minutes	13 September 2015	N/A
Alan and Damian are smitten with the mysterious Klaudia. Paweł tells the group that he is the one who will be going home. Later he says that it was a joke and nobody's leaving. The girls find smelly fish in the toilet. The group hosts the final house party.
40	16	"Episode 16"	60 minutes	20 September 2015	N/A
During the party Ewelina and Paweł question their relationship. They have a painful fight which leads to Paweł being kicked out. Everyone tries to support and help Ewelina. Meanwhile, Damian finds out that he beat the record. The group reflects on the most eventful season so far.
–	–	"The Trybsons, Part I"	60 minutes	27 September 2015	N/A
Eliza and Trybson discuss getting to know each other and falling in love during series 1. They get even closer after they go home. Eliza's pregnancy is a complete surprise. Trybson moves to Tuliszów so they can start a life together. Eliza gives birth to a baby girl.
–	–	"The Trybsons, Part II"	60 minutes	4 October 2015	N/A
The new parents adjust to life with Victoria. Trybson plans his proposal to Eliza. He surprises her during a romantic evening. The lovebirds travel to a fancy hotel. Trybson trains hard for an upcoming wrestling match while Eliza releases her first single.
