= Nathan Henry (TV personality) =

British reality television personality

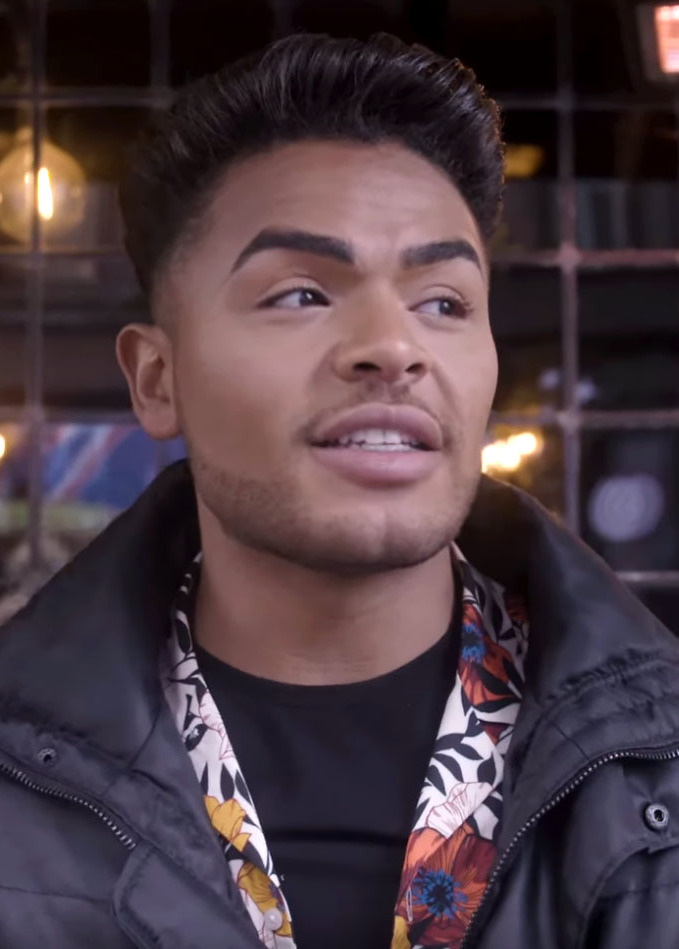
- Henry in 2018
- Born: England
- Occupation: Television personality
- Years active: 2015–present
- Television: Geordie Shore

Nathan Henry is an English television personality best known for appearing as a main cast member in the reality series Geordie Shore. He has also appeared on many other reality television series since rising to fame on Geordie Shore in 2015.

== Career ==
In 2015, Henry joined the British reality series Geordie Shore as a main cast member for the show's tenth season. He appeared alongside fellow new cast member Chloe Ferry as well as returning cast members from previous seasons. As of 2023, he holds up as one of the longest-serving cast members of the show's current bunch.

In 2018, Henry appeared on the celebrity show All Star Driving. Also in 2018, Henry appeared on episode 5 of the second series of CelebAbility. He was also a regular on Big Brother's Bit on the Side and was a presenter on the British version of Just Tattoo of Us. In 2019, Henry appeared on the seventh season of the British dating reality series Celebs Go Dating. Henry only appeared on one season of the show. Since 2021, Henry has guest co-hosted several episodes of Catfish UK through all three of its seasons.

In 2023, Henry appeared as a contestant on the British adaption of the reality-competition series The Challenge. Henry ended up placing second on the show. He later went on to appear on The Challenge: World Championship. However, he was medically removed on the first episode.

Also in 2023, Henry was announced as one of the contestants set to take part in the ninth season of I'm a Celebrity...Get Me Out of Here! Australia for his charity The Breast Cancer Foundation Australia. Henry was eliminated on 27 April 2023 and placed fourth overall, being the last celebrity eliminated before the grand finale.

== Personal life ==
Henry is gay. He initially came out as bisexual to Geordie Shore producers and his co-stars.

== Television ==
=== Appearances ===
Year	Title	Role	Notes
2015–present	Geordie Shore	Main Cast Member	Season 10 onwards; 155 Episodes
2018	All Star Driving	Himself	Contestant
2018	CelebAbility	Himself	Season 2; Episode 5
2018	Just Tattoo of Us	Guest presenter	Season 4; Episode 11
2019	Celebs Go Dating	Himself	Contestant; Season 7
2020, 2024	Warsaw Shore	Himself	Guest; Season 13 & 20; 5 Episodes
2021–present	Geordie React	Himself	Cast member (series 1–3)
2021–present	Catfish UK	Himself	Guest Co-Host
2023	The Challenge UK	Himself	Contestant; Runner-Up
2023	The Challenge: World Championship	Himself	Contestant; 1 Episode
2023	I'm a Celebrity...Get Me Out of Here! Australia	Himself	Contestant; 20 Episodes
2023	Germany Shore	Himself	Guest; Season 3; 2 Episodes
2025	Geordie Stories: Nathan and Dad	Himself	Documentary; 4 episodes
