= Warsaw Shore series 9 =

Warsaw Shore
- Season 9
- No. of episodes: 12

Release
- Original network: MTV; Player international
- Original release: 18 March – 17 June 2018

Series chronology
- ← Previous; Series 8: Summer Camp Next → Series 10

The ninth series of Warsaw Shore, a Polish television programme based in Warsaw, Poland was announced on 13 November 2017. The ninth season began airing on 18 March 2018. This will be the first series not to include Bartek Barański since he made his exit during the previous series. This was the final series to include original cast member Wojtek Gola following his decision to quit, as well Jacek Bystry and Jola Mróz after they were both axed from the show. The series also featured the brief return of three former cast members Jakub Henke, Alan Kwieciński and Mariusz "Ryjek" Adam.

== Cast ==
- Alan Kwieciński (Episodes 7–11)
- Damian Zduńczyk
- Ewelina Kubiak
- Jacek Bystry (Episodes 1–2, 4–6)
- Jakub Henke (Episodes 7–9)
- Jola Mróz (Episodes 1–6)
- Anna "Mała" Aleksandrzak
- Marcin "Brzydal" Maruszak
- Piotr Polak
- Mariusz "Ryjek" Adam (Episodes 11–12)
- Wiktoria Sypucińska (Episodes 1–11)
- Wojciech Gola (Episodes 1–5)

=== Duration of cast ===
Cast members	Series 9											
Cast members	1	2	3	4	5	6	7	8	9	10	11	12
Alan												
Damian												
Ewelina												
Jacek												
Jakub												
Jola												
Mała												
Marcin												
Piotr												
Ryjek												
Wiktoria												
Wojciech												

=== Notes ===
Key: = "Cast member" is featured in this episode.
Key: = "Cast member" voluntarily leaves the house.
Key: = "Cast member" returns to the house.
Key: = "Cast member" leaves the series.
Key: = "Cast member" returns to the series.
Key: = "Cast member" is removed from the series.
Key: = "Cast member" does not feature in this episode.
Key: = "Cast member" is not a cast member in this episode.

=== Off screen exits ===
- During the sixth episode, Jacek the Boss announced that Jola and Jacek had been removed from the house, and would not be returning for the remainder of the series. This led to the eventual departure of Jola and Jacek from the show.

== Episodes ==
No. overall	No. in season	Title	Duration	Original release date	Polish viewers (thousands)
105	1	"Episode 1"	60 minutes	18 March 2018	105 923
The team attends the MTV EMA pre-party. Jacek the boss greets them with important news: the next day they will start a new season. Stifler meets Jacek and Wojtek, along with another guest: his dog Sherman. Everybody is excited to be returning to Warsaw. Stifler, Ewelina, Mała, and Wojtek reminisce about the first three seasons. During the first night out, Stifler and Jola get sick while Pedro occupies the sleep room.
106	2	"Episode 2"	60 minutes	25 March 2018	57 728
Stifler asks the girls to look after Sherman. They decide to play a prank. The boys ride monster trucks. Mała and Brzydal get closer. At the club Jacek and Ewelina have a big fight. Jacek decides to leave the house, despite Jola's pleas for him to stay.
107	3	"Episode 3"	60 minutes	8 April 2018	132 331
Mała kicks out a rude guest. Sherman's barking keeps the team up at night. Jola and Wojtek go to work at a clothing shop. Stifler and Sherman spend time with a dog trainer. During a night out Jola tries to make Piotr jealous while Mała and Brzydal have their first kiss.
108	4	"Episode 4"	60 minutes	15 April 2018	90 870
Brzydal sets off firecrackers to wake up the other boys. Jacek returns to the house. The team goes to a club to celebrate Stifler's birthday. He requests a special present from his friends. Ewelina and Jacek reconcile when they go to work together. After a conversation with the boss, Stifler reluctantly agrees to take Sherman to a dog hotel.
109	5	"Episode 5"	60 minutes	22 April 2018	123 102
Jacek's boyfriend surprises him at a club. Jola loses her temper. Mała is devastated after Ewelina insults her. She finds comfort in Brzydal's arms. The next day the boys meet Trybson for a workout session. Wojtek decides it is time for him to leave. He tells the team during an emotional dinner.
110	6	"Episode 6"	60 minutes	6 May 2018	101 311
Tensions continue between Mała and the other girls. Jacek gets very drunk at the club. During a fight he pushes Wiktoria out of the car. Luckily the security guards catch her, preventing serious injury. Brzydal is less fortunate when Jola attacks him with her shoe. Mała takes him to the hospital with a bloody face. In the morning Jacek the boss announces that Jola and Jacek have been kicked out. Ewelina and Mała reconcile at work.
111	7	"Episode 7"	60 minutes	13 May 2018	86 923
The team decides to cleanse the house of negative energy. Stifler and Piotr get an idea to lighten the mood. However, Brzydal is the one who impresses the girls. The team wakes up to find Ptyś making breakfast. He is shocked when they tell him about the recent events. Later on Alan also visits.
112	8	"Episode 8"	60 minutes	20 May 2018	88 898
Wiktoria starts having feelings for Alan. Ptyś wakes up to a smelly surprise from the other boys. At the club Ewelina is smitten with a Spanish man. Alan ends up in the sleep room with Piotr's friend. In the morning he regrets it.
113	9	"Episode 9"	60 minutes	27 May 2018	114 472
Ptyś and Stifler visit Sherman, who is very happy at the dog hotel. Wiktoria and Alan bond during a game of pool. Brzydal prepares a romantic surprise for Mała. Ewelina has a big argument with Stifler. She decides to leave the house.
114	10	"Episode 10"	60 minutes	3 June 2018	110 899
In the morning Stifler is remorseful about what he said. Wiktoria is in her element when the team goes rollerskating. Stifler apologizes to Ewelina. She accepts and agrees to return to the house. At the club Wiktoria gets very drunk and comes onto Alan. He gently turns her down, which really upsets her.
115	11	"Episode 11"	60 minutes	10 June 2018	77 860
Ryjek visits the house. He enjoys himself until he accidentally gets stuck in a table. Stifler and Alan come to his rescue. Wiktoria leaves the house. During the house party Mała and Brzydal sleep together. Ewelina gets a surprise visitor.
116	12	"Episode 12"	60 minutes	17 June 2018	81 324
Pedro sets a new record. Stifler is delighted when Sherman returns to the house. The veterans congratulate Brzydal on staying and being a great team member. Jacek the boss reminds Ewelina and Stifler about their punishment. He also has one more surprise: instead of going home, the team will have a vacation in Tenerife.
