= Warsaw Shore series 11 =

Warsaw Shore
- Season 11
- No. of episodes: 13

Release
- Original network: MTV; Player international
- Original release: 24 March – 24 June 2019

Season chronology
- ← Previous; Series 10 Next → Series 12

The eleventh series of Warsaw Shore, a Polish television programme based in Warsaw, Poland was announced on 14 January 2019., and began airing on 24 March 2019. Ahead of the series it was announced that four new cast members had joined the series, including Anastasiya Yandaltsava, Damian Graf, Ewa Piekut and Kasjusz "Don Kasjo" Życiński. Damian Graf previously appeared on the second series of Ex on the Beach Poland. However, Anastasiya, Ewa and Kasjusz "Don Kasjo" previously appeared on the fourth series of the show. It will also be the first series not to include Marcin "Brzydal" Maruszak after he quit the show. The series also featured the brief return of Aleksandra Smoleń.

== Cast ==
- Aleksandra Smoleń (Episodes 8–9)
- Anastasiya Yandaltsava
- Klaudia "Czaja" Czajkowska (Episodes 2–13)
- Damian "Dzik" Graf
- Damian "Stifler" Zduńczyk
- Ewa Piekut
- Ewelina Kubiak
- Kasjusz "Don Kasjo" Życiński
- Klaudia Stec
- Anna "Mała" Aleksandrzak
- Patryk Spiker
- Piotr Polak

=== Duration of cast ===
| Cast members | Series 11 | | | | | | | | | | | | |
| Cast members | 1 | 2 | 3 | 4 | 5 | 6 | 7 | 8 | 9 | 10 | 11 | 12 | 13 |
| Aleksandra | | | | | | | | | | | | | |
| Anastasiya | | | | | | | | | | | | | |
| Czaja | | | | | | | | | | | | | |
| Damian G | | | | | | | | | | | | | |
| Damian Z | | | | | | | | | | | | | |
| Ewa | | | | | | | | | | | | | |
| Ewelina | | | | | | | | | | | | | |
| Kasjusz | | | | | | | | | | | | | |
| Klaudia | | | | | | | | | | | | | |
| Mała | | | | | | | | | | | | | |
| Patryk | | | | | | | | | | | | | |
| Piotr | | | | | | | | | | | | | |

=== Notes ===
Key: = "Cast member" is featured in this episode.
Key: = "Cast member" arrives in the house.
Key: = "Cast member" returns to the house.
Key: = "Cast member" leaves the series.
Key: = "Cast member" returns to the series.
Key: = "Cast member" does not feature in this episode.
Key: = "Cast member" is not a cast member in this episode.

== Episodes ==
| No. overall | No. in season | Title | Duration | Original release date | Polish viewers (thousands) |
|---|---|---|---|---|---|
| 129 | 1 | "Episode 1" | 60 minutes | 24 March 2019 | 65 839 |
The cast members return to Warsaw. Stifler has a new appearance and promises to enjoy himself. Ewa, Don Kasjo, and Damian "Dzik" join the team. The final new member is Anastasiya, who immediately connects with Stifler. Later on she offends the other girls. Klaudia has enough and spills her drink on Anastasiya.
| 130 | 2 | "Episode 2" | 60 minutes | 31 March 2019 | 125 084 |
Don Kasjo and Ewa share an intimate moment. Mała takes care of Stifler while he is drunk, making Anastasiya very jealous. Tensions come to a boil between her and Ewelina. In the morning a remorseful Anastasiya reconciles with the group. Jacek welcomes the new members and reminds everybody of the rules. Czaja returns to the team and immediately catches Dzik's eye.
| 131 | 3 | "Episode 3" | 60 minutes | 7 April 2019 | 118 713 |
On the way home, Dzik's behaviour shocks the girls. He is ashamed when he sobers up. However, the situation greatly improves Anastasiya and Ewelina's relationship. Klaudia and Don Kasjo team up to play a prank. Jacek says that Anastasiya will choose Dzik's punishment. Spiker helps execute her entertaining plan.
| 132 | 4 | "Episode 4" | 60 minutes | 14 April 2019 | 80 220 |
Love is in the air at the house. Mała and Pedro end up in bed after a wild night. Stifler takes Anastasiya on a romantic date. Dzik and Czaja continue getting closer while working in a restaurant. Meanwhile, the team has an underwater photo shoot.
| 133 | 5 | "Episode 5" | 60 minutes | 21 April 2019 | 51 212 |
Don Kasjo and Dzik put Klaudia's mattress in the pool while she is half asleep. In the morning Dzik and Don Kasjo are too drunk to go to work, while Pedro and Klaudia are too sleepy to replace them. The team goes to a trampoline park. That night Anastasiya and Stifler take the next step in their relationship.
| 134 | 6 | "Episode 6" | 60 minutes | 5 May 2019 | 87 537 |
Czaja flirts with a Turkish man at the club. The team continues the party back at the house. Ewa and Klaudia come to Czaja's defence when her guest becomes aggressive. Things get heated in the pool. Spiker bonds with Don Kasjo during a skating competition.
| 135 | 7 | "Episode 7" | 60 minutes | 12 May 2019 | 52 145 |
Don Kasjo is annoyed after Dzik accidentally breaks his teeth. At the club the team meets up with their Norwegian friends. Ewelina's search for romance does not go as planned. Mała and Ewa have a hard day of work at a car wash. A remorseful Dzik arranges a dentist visit for Don Kasjo.
| 136 | 8 | "Episode 8" | 60 minutes | 19 May 2019 | 63 440 |
The group has a wild night at a club. Ewa gets into a fight when she overhears somebody insulting her. Don Kasjo has an unexpected admirer. While working a hair salon, Spiker gets a makeover. The girls learn about the time of the dinosaurs. Czaja and Anastasiya have an argument. A surprise guest comes to the house. Ola visits the team.
| 137 | 9 | "Episode 9" | 60 minutes | 26 May 2019 | 68 261 |
The team has a wild house party. Klaudia gets revenge on an aggressive guest. Ewa argues with an ex-boyfriend. In the morning Don Kasjo plays a prank on Dzik. The group goes bungee jumping. Stifler and Anastasiya have fun in the pool.
| 138 | 10 | "Episode 10" | 60 minutes | 2 June 2019 | 76 765 |
At the costume party, Stifler talks with a female fan. This causes his first disagreement with Anastasiya. Ewelina and Spiker misbehave after having too many drinks. The next day the team takes a trip to Zegrze. They witness a rescue on the frozen lake before taking a swim themselves. Back in Warsaw, the boys get dressed up for a special performance.
| 139 | 11 | "Episode 11" | 60 minutes | 9 June 2019 | 159 112 |
Ewa, Ewelina, and Czaja play a prank. The boys come home to find the door blocked and their bags packed. The group goes to a bowling alley where Spiker and Czaja have the best luck. Anastasiya shares some tricks with Stifler. Don Kasjo starts to become jealous of their relationship and acts out. He ends up having a big fight with most of the team. Klaudia manages to calm him down.
| 140 | 12 | "Episode 12" | 60 minutes | 16 June 2019 | 80 183 |
Emotions run high during the team's final night out. Don Kasjo defends the girls from an anti-fan. Piotr tries to seduce Ewa without success. Stifler breaks up a fight on the way home. Ewelina comforts Ewa when Piotr's behaviour upsets her. Dzik and Spiker get sick from drinking too much. The next day Stifler and Anastasiya get tattoos together. Jacek has one more surprise: before everyone goes home, they will attend two parties.
| 141 | 13 | "Episode 13" | 60 minutes | 24 June 2019 (Player.pl) | N/A |
The team travels to Poznań for their club events. At the first party, Mała and Klaudia are interested in the same man. Ptyś and his girlfriend Oliwia have dinner with Stifler and Anastasiya. Wojtek surprises the group at their second party.
