= Warsaw Shore series 1 =

Warsaw Shore
- Season 1
- No. of episodes: 11 + 2 Specials

Release
- Original network: MTV
- Original release: 10 November 2013 – 2 February 2014

Series chronology
- Next → Series 2

The first series of Warsaw Shore, a Polish television programme based in Warsaw, began airing on 10 November 2013 on MTV, after transmission from 2013 MTV Europe Music Awards in Amsterdam, Nederlands. The series concluded on 2 February 2014 after 11 episodes and 2 specials including an episode counting down the best bits of the series and reunion show hosted by Katarzyna Kępka. This was the only series to feature Mariusz Śmietanowski. Holly Hagan and Scott Timlin from Geordie Shore made a guest appearance during the last episode of the season.

== Cast ==
- Anna Ryśnik
- Eliza Wesołowska
- Ewelina Kubiak
- Anna "Mała" Aleksandrzak
- Mariusz Śmietanowski
- Paweł Cattaneo
- Paweł "Trybson" Trybała
- Wojciech Gola

=== Duration of cast ===
| Cast members | Series 1 | | | | | | | | | | |
| Cast members | 1 | 2 | 3 | 4 | 5 | 6 | 7 | 8 | 9 | 10 | 11 |
| Anna | | | | | | | | | | | |
| Eliza | | | | | | | | | | | |
| Ewelina | | | | | | | | | | | |
| Mała | | | | | | | | | | | |
| Mariusz | | | | | | | | | | | |
| Paweł | | | | | | | | | | | |
| Trybson | | | | | | | | | | | |
| Wojciech | | | | | | | | | | | |

=== Notes ===
Key: = "Cast member" is featured in this episode.
Key: = "Cast member" arrives in the house.
Key: = "Cast member" voluntarily leaves the house.
Key: = "Cast member" returns to the house.
Key: = "Cast member" leaves the series.

== Episodes ==
| No. overall | No. in season | Title | Duration | Original release date | Polish viewers (thousands) |
|---|---|---|---|---|---|
| 1 | 1 | "Episode 1" | 60 minutes | 10 November 2013 | 230,000 |
Eight people arrive in the new home: a villa with a swimming pool, a gym and a big garden. Paweł arrives first, followed by Eliza. She immediately catches his eye, so the whole evening is devoted to trying to seduce her. When all the residents arrive, the party moves to the swimming pool. At the very beginning, conflict erupts between the girls. Anna and Ewelina do not like the behaviour of the other tenants. Wojtek and Trybson arrange a show of force.
| 2 | 2 | "Episode 2" | 60 minutes | 17 November 2013 | 140,116 |
The group meets their boss Żaneta. They will be working at a gym. Everyone gets a lesson about taking responsibility. Emotional dilemmas are accompanied by a question - who will land in the "sleep room" first. All residents of the house take part in the first event at a club.
| 3 | 3 | "Episode 3" | 60 minutes | 24 November 2013 | 149,994 |
The first misunderstanding happens in the group. The boys get into a fight, Eliza loses control, and Ewelina goes to the hospital. The girls also investigate how the alcohol went missing. Is it a punishment or somebody playing a prank?
| 4 | 4 | "Episode 4" | 60 minutes | 1 December 2013 | 210,827 |
Radosław Majdan, a Polish former football goalkeeper, visits the house. This creates a stir among members of the group. Anna cooks dinner for him. Eliza wonders how to prepare to meet her idol. After a conversation with Radosław, they appreciate his wisdom. In addition, the gang carefully prepares for another photo session. At one point, a brawl breaks out between Paweł and Anna. Both do not mince words. Mała and Wojtek continue to get closer. In the evening, the team goes to a party.
| 5 | 5 | "Episode 5" | 60 minutes | 8 December 2013 | 159,827 |
A meeting on the set, a visit to Mariusz's parents' farm, and a party in an international company. In addition, Paweł invites Anna to dinner at a Greek restaurant. Eliza has too much alcohol. Trybson tries to pick up a Portuguese girl and take her home. In the house there is a brawl between him and Paweł.
| 6 | 6 | "Episode 6" | 60 minutes | 15 December 2013 | N/A |
The team watches the football match between Poland and England. Beautiful Brazilian girls are at the bar and four men are in their element. Another member catches Eliza's eye. Others ride go-karts and bungee jump. Anna leaves the house.
| 7 | 7 | "Episode 7" | 60 minutes | 22 December 2013 | 184,698 |
A well-known person comes to the house. Paweł ends up in a love triangle. Ewelina starts a fight in one of clubs in Katowice. Trybson loses self-control and decides to go all the way. Żaneta is horrified by the state of the house. She gives them an ultimatum: if the house is not cleaned, the party will be cancelled.
| 8 | 8 | "Episode 8" | 60 minutes | 29 December 2013 | 277,288 |
With help from friends and fans, the team organizes a Hawaiian party to celebrate Paweł's birthday. They make a big mess, leading to a massive clean up in the morning. The boys try to persuade Anna to reconcile with the other girls.
| 9 | 9 | "Episode 9" | 60 minutes | 5 January 2014 | N/A |
Paweł and Mariusz go to the florist. While left to themselves, the girls wage fierce quarrels. Getting away from duties upsets Anna, while Eliza has an accident. At night the girls suspect the house is haunted. Wojtek plays a prank on his gullible roommates. Trybson tries to share his love for martial arts. Mariusz is injured, while Wojtek and Paweł fight. While most of the group goes to a party, Anna and Ewelina stay at home. The time spent together changes the relationship between the two girls.
| 10 | 10 | "Episode 10" | 60 minutes | 12 January 2014 | 217,195 |
The gang arrives in Kraków. They wander beneath Wawel to take a pic of the famous dragon living there. Later, an evening event turns out to be much more important than the legendary reptile. Paweł invites a girl he just met to the limousine, but Anna gets the best bird. After returning to Warsaw, the group takes part in salsa lessons. Wojtek tries to pick up the instructor with the help of Mała. Back at the house, cast members from the program In & Out pay a visit.
| 11 | 11 | "Episode 11" | 60 minutes | 19 January 2014 | 265,796 |
Holly and Scott from Geordie Shore come to the house. The two British guests discover Polish hospitality. After dinner, the hosts and guests go to a party. Mała and Eliza compete for attention from the British hunk. In the club, Paweł picks up a new girl. Mariusz disappears with one to the toilets. There is an international conflict between Ewelina and Scott. After the party, the crew prepares for the MTV EMA Pre-Party. The next day everyone says goodbye to each other before heading home.
| – | – | "Best Bits" | 60 minutes | 26 January 2014 | N/A |
A look back at the most memorable moments from the first series.
| – | – | "Reunion" | 60 minutes | 2 February 2014 | N/A |
Katarzyna Kępka hosts as the cast reunite to discuss the events of the first series.
