= Warsaw Shore =

Polish reality TV show

- Genre: Reality
- Created by: MTV Poland
- Starring: Cast
- Country of origin: Poland
- Original language: Polish
- No. of series: 21
- No. of episodes: 267 (list of episodes)

Production
- Executive producers: Maria Czech; Jerzy Kisała; Wojciech Waśkiewicz
- Running time: 42 minutes (excluding adverts)
- Production companies: Golden Media Polska (series 1–3); Dragon Media (series 4); Dragon Head (series 5–21)

Original release
- Network: MTV Poland; Player International 2016–2024
- Release: November 10, 2013 – December 22, 2024

Related
- Ex on the Beach Poland; Geordie Shore; All Star Shore; Polska Shore

Warsaw Shore or Warsaw Shore: Ekipa z Warszawy is a Polish reality television series broadcast on MTV Poland. Based in Warsaw, it was first broadcast on 10 November 2013, and is the Polish spin-off of the American show Jersey Shore.

On June 11, 2025, MTV confirmed that the show has ended after twenty-one seasons and will not be continued. The series’ final episode aired on December 22, 2024. 267 episodes were produced.

In June 2026, Polska Shore premiered on Canal+; a show with the same format, but with no connection whatsoever to MTV.

== Series ==
Year	Series	Predominant Location	Number of Episodes	Average MTV viewers
2013–14	Series 1	Warsaw	11	189 823
2014	Series 2	Warsaw	13	158 450
2015	Series 3	Warsaw	16	100 935
2015	Series 4	Łeba	12	115 936
2016	Series 5	Wrocław	16	84 223
2016	Series 6	Mielno	12	97 000
2017	Series 7	Zakopane	12	100 462
2017	Series 8	Władysławowo	12	114 807
2018	Series 9	Warsaw	12	97 637
2018	Series 10	Łeba	12	62 020
2019	Series 11	Warsaw	13	79 664
2019	Series 12	Mielno	13	N/A
2020	Series 13	Warsaw	13	N/A
2020	Series 14	Warsaw	12	N/A
2021	Series 15	Warsaw	12	N/A
2021	Series 16	Łeba	12	N/A
2022	Series 17	Wrocław	12	N/A
2023	Series 18	Warsaw	13	N/A
2023	Series 19	Mielno	13	N/A
2024	Series 20	Warsaw	13	N/A
2024	Series 21	Szczecin	13	N/A
2025	Series 22	Warsaw	Canceled	

=== Series 1 (2013–2014) ===
Warsaw Shore was commissioned on August 23, 2013. Series 1 of Warsaw Shore premiered on 10 November 2013 on MTV Poland after 2013 MTV Europe Music Awards in Amsterdam, Netherlands and concluded 19 January 2014, consisting of 11 episodes. It was then followed by a Best Bits special on January 26, 2014, which counted down the best moments from the first series. On February 2, 2014, there was a reunion show hosted by Katarzyna Kępka where the cast discussed the series in front of an audience. This was the only series to feature Mariusz Śmietanowski. As of January 2014, the show is also broadcast in Denmark, Sweden, Germany, Switzerland, Finland, Belgium, Netherlands, Norway, and the Flanders region.

=== Series 2 (2014) ===
The second series of the show began airing on 20 April 2014 and concluded on 13 July 2014, consisting of 13 episodes. The show's renewal was announced on 10 February 2014. The second series began on 20 April, during Easter. After Series 1 Mariusz Śmietanowski announced he was leaving the show and would not appear in the second series. This was the first series to feature new cast members Jakub Henke, Alan Kwieciński, Alicja Herodzińska and Malwina Pycka. The premiere episode of second series was the last episode for Paweł "Trybson" Trybała and Eliza Wesołowska as full-time cast members because of Eliza's pregnancy. This was the only series to feature Alicja Herodzińska and Malwina Pycka. Jakub Henke, who left the show after this season returned as a full-time cast member in Warsaw Shore: Summer Camp.

=== Series 3 (2015) ===
The third series of the show began airing on 29 March 2015 and concluded on 20 September 2015, consisting of 16 episodes. The renewal was announced on 23 January 2015. The third series began airing on March 29, 2015. In February 2015 it was confirmed that the third series would begin with two new cast members: Magda Pyznar and Damian Zduńczyk. The series featured former cast members Paweł Trybała and Eliza Wesołowska, who returned to the show as guests. During the third series, on June 9, 2015, MTV Poland confirmed a new show with Eliza and Trybson called "Warsaw Shore: Watch with the Trybsons" would air during summer. The series premiere of the show aired on June 21, 2015, replacing Warsaw Shore after 12 episodes. The rest of season 3 started airing on 30 August 2015. On 14 July 2015, it was confirmed that Paweł Cattaneo has been axed from the show. In addition it was announced that Ewelina Kubiak also leaves the show because of Paweł and would not appear in the next series. On 6 September 2015, it was confirmed that new cast member Klaudia Stec had joined the cast in episode 14 of series 3. The series was then followed by two special episodes called The Trybsons which tells the story of Paweł "Trybson" and Eliza's life. Two special episodes were created by Trybson and Eliza and MTV aired them to see if viewers were interested in lives of the two. The episodes aired on September 27 and October 4, 2015.

=== Series 4: Summer Camp (2015–2016) ===
The fourth series of the show was announced on 13 July 2015. The series began on 11 October 2015. This is the first series not to include original cast members Paweł Cattaneo and Ewelina Kubiak, who left at the end of the previous series. In September 2015 when the series premiere was announced, it was confirmed this season will consist of 12 episodes. This series marks the return of Jakub Henke as main cast member. Ahead of the premiere it was confirmed that the series would be filmed in a Polish seaside town Łeba. On 29 December 2015, MTV Poland confirmed a new show with Anna "Mała", Klaudia, Magda and Ewelina called "Warsaw Shore – Summer Camp: Watching with the Girls", which girls will jointly view and comment on the summer adventures of Warsaw Shore cast members. The series began airing on 10 January 2016, replacing the summer series of Warsaw Shore after 12 episodes.

=== Series 5 (2016) ===
The fifth series of the show was announced on 13 November 2015. The series began airing on 28 February 2016. This series would not include Alan Kwieciński, who left the show after the fourth series Warsaw Shore: Summer Camp. In his place twin brothers – Paweł and Piotr Kluk joined the series. This series marks the return of Ewelina Kubiak as a main cast member. Ahead of the premiere it was confirmed that the series would be filmed in Wrocław. On 18 April 2016 it was announced that original cast member Anna Ryśnik had quit the show and this is her last season.

=== Series 6: Summer Camp 2 (2016) ===
The sixth series of the show was announced on 16 June 2016. The series start filming on July 1 in Mielno. The series began airing on 28 August 2016. This was the first series not to include Anna Ryśnik since she made her exit during the previous series. Twin brothers – Pauly and Pietro Kluk and Ewelina Kubiak also left the show. On 12 August 2016 it was confirmed that the sixth series would begin with two new cast members Aleksandra Smoleń and Piotr Polak. On 20 October 2016 it was announced that Klaudia Stec had quit the show mid-series and in her place will come a new cast member Ewelina "Młoda" Bańkowska.

=== Series 7: Winter Camp (2017) ===
The seventh series of the show was announced on 20 January 2017. The series began airing on 26 February 2017. It was confirmed that cast member Aleksandra Smoleń had quit the show after the sixth series Warsaw Shore: Summer Camp 2. On 14 February 2017 it was announced that three former cast members Alan Kwieciński, Ewelina Kubiak and Klaudia Stec, who performed in a previous series, returned to the show. Ahead of the premiere it was confirmed that the series would be filmed in Zakopane.

=== Series 8: Summer Camp 3 (2017) ===
The eighth series of the show was announced on 14 July 2017. The series began airing on 3 September 2017. Five former cast members Jakub Henke, Alan Kwieciński, Magda Pyznar, Klaudia Stec and Ewelina "Młoda" Bańkowska had quit the show after seventh series of Warsaw Shore: Winter Camp. This was the first series to include nine new cast members Jola Mróz, who had previously appeared on the first series of Ex on the Beach Poland as a main cast member and second series as an ex-girlfriend of current cast member Piotr (before he joined Warsaw Shore), Anna "Andzia" Papierz, Bartek Barański, Ilona Borowska, Jacek Bystry, Kamila Widz, Marcin "Brzydal" Maruszak, Mariusz "Ryjek" Adam and Wiktoria Sypucińska. It also features the return of original cast member Anna "Mała" Aleksandrzak, who made her exit during the previous series. The series also featured the show's 100th episode. Ahead of the premiere it was confirmed that the series would be filmed in Władysławowo.

=== Series 9 (2018) ===
The ninth series of the show was announced on 13 November 2017. The series began airing on 18 March 2018. Bartek Barański, who made his first appearance in series eight, did not return. This was the final series to include original cast member Wojtek Gola following his decision to quit, as well Jacek Bystry and Jola Mróz after they were both axed from the show. Wiktoria Sypucińska also left in episode 11. This series also featured the brief return of three former cast members Jakub Henke, Alan Kwieciński and Mariusz "Ryjek" Adam.

=== Series 10 (2018–2019) ===
The tenth series of the show was filmed in July 2018 and began airing on 21 October 2018, under the name Warsaw Shore X. The series was filmed in Polish seaside town Łeba, making this the second series to be filmed there following the fourth series in 2015. This will be the first series to include four new cast members Filip Ćwiek who had previously appeared on the second series of Ex on the Beach Poland, Julia Kruzer, Patryk Spiker and Klaudia "Czaja" Czajkowska. It was also the first series not to include original cast member Wojtek Gola after he quit the show for personal reasons. Former cast member Klaudia Stec returned to the show in this series. The series also featured the brief return of nine former cast members Wiktoria Sypucińska, Jakub Henke, Alan Kwieciński, Ewelina "Młoda" Bańkowska, Aleksandra Smoleń, Wojtek Gola, Bartek Barański, Kamila Widz and Piotr Kluk. Paweł "Trybson" Trybała also returned to the show as the boss. On 13 January 2019 it was announced that Marcin "Brzydal" Maruszak had quit the show and this is his last season.

=== Series 11 (2019) ===
The eleventh series of the show was confirmed on 14 January 2019 and began airing on 24 March 2019. Filip Ćwiek and Julia Kruzer did not return after Series 10. This was the first series to include four new cast members Anastasiya Yandaltsava, Ewa Piekut, Damian Graf and Kasjusz "Don Kasjo" Życiński. Damian Graf previously appeared on the second series of Ex on the Beach Poland as main cast member. However, Anastasiya, Ewa and Kasjusz "Don Kasjo" previously appeared on the fourth series of the show as main cast members. It was also the first series not to include Marcin "Brzydal" Maruszak after he quit the show. The series also featured the brief return of Aleksandra Smoleń.

=== Series 12 (2019) ===
The twelfth series of the show was confirmed in July 2019 and began airing on 22 September 2019. The series was filmed in Mielno, making this the second series to be filmed there following the sixth series in 2016. This is the first series not to include two former cast members Klaudia "Czaja" Czajkowska and Klaudia Stec who had quit the show after the previous series. It was also the first series to include six new cast members Hungarian celebrity Gábor "Gabo" Szabó, Joanna Bałdys, Paweł Hałabuda, Anna Tokarska, Radosław "Diva" Majchrowski and Sasha Muzheiko, who had previously appeared on the sixth series of Top Model. The series also featured the brief return of Jakub Henke and Wojciech Gola. This was the final series to include cast member Damian "Stifler" Zduńczyk following his decision to quit. It was also later announced that this would be Anna "Mała" Aleksandrzak's last series.

=== Series 13 (2020) ===
The thirteenth series of the show was confirmed in January 2020. The series was scheduled on 29 March 2020, but was cancelled due to the COVID-19 pandemic and postponed to another date. The new start date is 6 September 2020 and episodes began airing on Sunday and Wednesday. This is the first series not to include original cast members Anna "Mała" Aleksandrzak and Damian "Stifler" Zduńczyk who had quit the show after the previous series. It was also the first series to include two new cast members Milena Łaszek and Marceli Szklanny.

=== Series 14 (2020–2021) ===
The fourteenth series of the show was confirmed on 27 July 2020 and began filming at the beginning of August. The photos were taken in Warsaw, in compliance with all safety rules related to the COVID-19 pandemic. The series began airing on 15 November 2020. This was the first series not to include Anastasiya Yandaltsava, Gábor "Gabo" Szabó, and Marceli Szklanny after their departures the previous season. It was also the first series to include five new cast members Kinga Gondorowicz, Maciek Szczukiewicz, Daniel "Arnold" Jabłoński, Michał Eliszer and Paulina Karbowiak. Jakub "Ptyś" Henke returned to the show as the boss.

=== Series 15 (2021) ===
The fifteenth series of the show was confirmed in February 2021. The photos were taken in Warsaw, in compliance with all safety rules related to the COVID-19 pandemic. The series began airing on 28 March 2021. This is the first series not to include Ewelina Kubiak, Piotr Polak, Joanna Bałdys, Daniel "Arnold" Jabłoński, Paulina Karbowiak and Michał Eliszer after their departures the previous season. It will also be the first series to include six new cast members Oliwia Dziatkiewicz, Jeremiasz "Jez" Szmigiel, Lena Majewska, Dominik Raczkowski, Patrycja Morkowska and Kamil Jagielski. Dominik Raczkowski was removed in episode 8. This was the final series to feature Damian "Dzik" Graf following his decision to quit the show. The series also featured the brief return of three former cast members Piotr Polak, Alan Kwieciński, and Michał Eliszer.

=== Series 16 (2021) ===
The sixteenth season of the show was confirmed in May 2021. The series was filmed in July and August 2021 in the Polish coastal city of Łeba, it is the first series since the thirteen season to be filmed in public places, this due to the situation in Poland during the COVID-19 pandemic. The series began airing on 19 September 2021. This is the first series to not include Ewa Piekut, Damian "Dzik" Graf, Kinga Gondorowicz, and Maciek Szczukiewicz after their departures the previous season. Ewelina Kubiak and Daniel Jabłoński returned as main cast members. It was also the first series to include only one new cast member, Michał "Sarna" Sarnowski. The series also featured the show's 200th episode. The series also featured the brief return of three former cast members Piotr Polak, Damian "Dzik" Graf, and Damian "Stifler" Zduńczyk. This was the final series to feature Kasjusz "Don Kasjo" Życiński following his decision to quit the show.

=== Series 17 (2022) ===
The seventeenth series of the show was confirmed in April 2022 and began airing on 18 September 2022. Dragon Head confirmed that the series would be filmed in July in the city of Wrocław, it is the first series to be filmed there since the fifth season. This is also the first series not to include Daniel "Arnold" Jabłoński, Radosław "Diva" Majchrowski, Patrycja Morkowska, and the original member Ewelina Kubiak after their departures the previous season. It will be also the first series to include five new cast members, Aleksandra Okrzesik, Przemysław "Sequento" Skulski, Wiktoria "Jaszczur" Robert, Dominik Gul and Małgorzata "Gosia" Jeziorowska. The series also featured the brief return of two former cast members Alan Kwieciński and Ewa Piekut.

During the second episode, it was announced that Dominik and Małgorzata had been kicked out of the house for breaking the rules and were eventually kicked out of the season.

=== Series 18 (2023) ===
The eighteenth series of the show was confirmed in January 2023 and began airing on March 19, 2023. Dragon Head confirmed that the series would be filmed in Radom, Warsaw and Łódź. This is also the first series not to include Jeremiasz "Jez" Szmigiel and Kamil Jagielski after their departures the previous season. It will be also the first series to include four new cast members, Angelika Kramer, who had previously appeared on the fourth series of Love Island Polska, Eliasz Zdzitowiecki, Marcin Pastuszka and Piotr Nowakowski. The series also featured the brief return of two former cast members Damian "Dzik" Graf and Kasjusz "Don Kasjo" Życiński, and the original cast member Ewelina "Ewelona" Kubiak.

=== Series 19 (2023) ===
The nineteenth series of the show was confirmed on June 21, 2023, and began airing on 17 September 2023. The series was filmed in Mielno, making this the third series to be filmed there following the sixth series in 2016 and twelfth series in 2019. This is the first series to include two new cast members, Iryna "Renatka" Maltseva and Ronaldo „Czarny Polak” Miranda. This is also the first series not to include Wiktoria "Jaszczur" Robert, Piotr Nowakowski, Eliasz Zdzitowiecki and Oliwia Dziatkiewicz after their departures the previous season.

=== Series 20 (2024) ===
The twentieth series of the show was confirmed on September 29, 2023, and began airing on March 17, 2024. It was filmed between November and December 2023 mainly in Warsaw and also in Łódź. This is also the first series not to include Milena Łaszek, Michał Sarnowski and Przemysław "Sequento" Skulski after their departures the previous season. The series also featured the return of Jeremiasz "Jez" Szmigiel. It will be also the first series to include four new cast members Diana Mościcka, Grzesiek Tomaszewski, Magda Pawińska and Olaf Majewski. The series will feature the brief returns of former cast members Damian "Stifler" Zduńczyk, Kasjusz "Don Kasjo" Życiński, Radosław "Diva" Majchrowski, Kamil Jagielski, and original cast member Anna "Mała" Aleksandrzak.

=== Series 21 (2024) ===
The twenty-first series of the show was confirmed in July 2024 and began airing on September 22, 2024. The series was filmed in Szczecin. This is also the first series not to include Lena Majewska, Magda Pawińska and Olaf Majewski after their departures the previous season. The series also featured the return of Oliwia Dziatkiewicz. It will be also the first series to include four new cast members Adam Mikołajczyk, Julita Izdebska, Łukasz Budyń and Michał Sewera. Original cast member Ewelina Kubiak returned to the show as the boss replacing Jakub "Ptyś" Henke. This was the final series to feature Patryk Spiker following his decision to quit the show.

=== Series 22 (Unaired) ===
The twenty-second season was filmed in Warsaw in February 2025 and was scheduled to premiere in March of that year, but was canceled following the death of Jeremiasz "Jez" Szmigiel, who had been a cast member since 2021. Paramount commissioned a new season in October 2024. The cast list was released by MTV in January 2025: Adam Mikołajczyk, Grzesiek Tomaszewski, and Michał Sewera did not return after the previous season; Milena Łaszek's return was confirmed, as well as the addition of three new male members, including Dawid, Kamil Sowa, and Love Island Poland star Daniel Kowalski. Special appearances by Italia Shore stars Francesco Russo and Swamy Prinno were also announced.

== Cast ==
Cast members	Seasons																				
Cast members	1	2	3	4	5	6	7	8	9	10	11	12	13	14	15	16	17	18	19	20	21
Anna "Mała" Aleksandrzak																					
Paweł Cattaneo																					
Wojciech "WG" Gola																					
Ewelina "Ewelona" Kubiak																					
Anna Ryśnik																					
Mariusz "Śmietana" Śmietanowski																					
Paweł "Trybson" Trybała																					
Eliza Wesołowska																					
Jakub "Ptyś" Henke																					
Alicja Herodzińska																					
Alan Kwieciński																					
Malwina Pycka																					
Magda Pyznar																					
Klaudia Stec																					
Damian "Stifler" Zduńczyk																					
Paweł Kluk																					
Piotr Kluk																					
Ewelina "Młoda" Bańkowska																					
Piotr "Pedro" Polak																					
Aleksandra Smoleń																					
Mariusz "Ryjek" Adam †																					
Bartek Barański																					
Ilona Borowska																					
Jacek Bystry																					
Marcin "Brzydal" Maruszak																					
Jola Mróz																					
Anna "Andzia" Papierz																					
Wiktoria Sypucińska																					
Kamila Widz																					
Filip Ćwiek																					
Klaudia "Czaja" Czajkowska																					
Julia Kruzer																					
Patryk Spiker																					
Damian "Dzik" Graf																					
Ewa Piekut																					
Anastasiya Yandaltsava																					
Kasjusz "Don Kasjo" Życiński																					
Joanna "Asia" Bałdys																					
Paweł Hałabuda																					
Radosław "Diva" Majchrowski																					
Aleksandr "Sasha" Muzheiko																					
Gábor "Gabo" Szabó																					
Anna Tokarska																					
Milena Łaszek																					
Marceli Szklanny																					
Michał Eliszer																					
Kinga Gondorowicz																					
Daniel "Arnold" Jabłoński																					
Paulina Karbowiak																					
Maciek Szczukiewicz																					
Oliwia Dziatkiewicz																					
Kamil Jagielski																					
Lena Majewska																					
Patrycja Morkowska																					
Dominik Raczkowski																					
Jeremiasz "Jez" Szmigiel †																					
Michał "Sarna" Sarnowski																					
Dominik Gul																					
Małgorzata "Gosia" Jeziorowska																					
Aleksandra "Ola" Okrzesik																					
Wiktoria "Jaszczur" Robert																					
Przemysław "Sequento" Skulski																					
Angelika Kramer																					
Piotr "Piotrek" Nowakowski																					
Marcin "Mały" Pastuszka																					
Eliasz Zdzitowiecki																					
Iryna "Renatka" Maltseva																					
Ronaldo "Czarny Polak" Miranda																					
Olaf Majewski																					
Diana Mościcka																					
Magda Pawińska																					
Grzesiek Tomaszewski																					
Łukasz Budyń																					
Julita Izdebska																					
Adam Mikołajczyk																					
Michał Sewera																					

= Cast member features in this series
= Cast member features as a guest in this series
= Cast member features as a boss in this series
= Cast member does not feature in this series

=== Other appearances ===
As well as appearing in Warsaw Shore, some of the cast members have appeared on other reality-shows:

Top Model

- Anastasiya Yandaltsava – Series 3 (2013) – Not selected
- Aleksandr "Sasha" Muzheiko – Series 6 (2016) – Twelfth
- Kasjusz "Don Kasjo" Życiński – Series 6 (2016) - Bootcamp

Hell's Kitchen. Piekielna kuchnia

- Mariusz "Ryjek" Adam – Series 2 (2014) – Fifteenth
- Anna "Mała" Aleksandrzak – Series 5 (2016) – Twelfth (withdrew)

Ex on the Beach Poland

- Wojciech "WG" Gola – Series 1 (2016)
- Jola Mróz – Series 1 (2016), series 2 (2017)
- Filip Ćwiek – Series 2 (2017)
- Damian "Dzik" Graf – Series 2 (2017)
- Piotr "Pedro" Polak – Series 2 (2017)
- Magda Pyznar – Series 2 (2017)
- Alan Kwieciński – Series 3 (2017)
- Damian "Stifler" Zduńczyk – Series 3 (2017)
- Anna Ryśnik – Series 4 (2018)
- Bartek Barański – Series 4 (2018)
- Anastasiya Yandaltsava – Series 4 (2018)
- Ewa Piekut – Series 4 (2018)
- Kasjusz "Don Kasjo" Życiński – Series 4 (2018)

Celeb vagyok, ments ki innen!

- Gábor "Gabo" Szabó – Series 5 (2017) – Third

Dom-2

- Anastasiya Yandaltsava

One Night Squad (2021)

- Piotr "Pedro" Polak
- Anastasiya Yandaltsava
- Damian "Stifler" Zduńczyk

The Challenge

- Gábor "Gabo" Szabó - The Challenge: Spies, Lies & Allies (2021)

Love Island. Wyspa miłości

- Angelika Kramer – Series 4 (2021) – Sixth eliminated
- Aleksandr "Sasha" Muzheiko – Series 6 (2022) – Winner
- Kamil Jagielski – Series 7 (2023) – Runner-up
- Daniel Kowalski – Series 9 (2024) – Tenth eliminated

All Star Shore

- Patryk Spiker – Series 1 (2022)

Love Me or Leave Me. Kochaj albo rzuć.

- Magda Pawińska (2023)

Królowa przetrwania

- Ewelina "Ewelona" Kubiak – Series 1 (2023–2024)
- Ewa Piekut – Series 1 (2023–2024)
- Eliza Wesołowska – Series 2 (2025)

== Music ==
In July 2014, Ewelina released her debut single "Lato Moja Miłość" (eng. Summer of my Love). As of August 2016 her single reached over 1 million views on YouTube. Paweł Cattaneo appears in the music video.

In January 2015, Eliza released her debut single "Jesteś dla mnie moją kokainą" (eng. You're my cocaine). As of August 2016 her single reached over 2 million views on YouTube. Paweł "Trybson" Trybała appears in the music video.

=== Singles ===
Year	Artist	Single	Album
2014	EwelONA	"Lato Moja Miłość"	Non-album singles
2015	PawL & Ptyś	"Kukuryny"	Non-album singles
2015	PawL & Ptyś	"Łap Bit"	Non-album singles
2015	Elizka	"Jesteś dla mnie moją kokainą"	Non-album singles
2015	Elizka	"Tajemnica"	Non-album singles
2015	WG x DIEGO	"Ponad Horyzont"	Ponad Horyzont
2015	WG x DIEGO	"To Nie Jest Koniec"	Ponad Horyzont
2016	PawL & Ptyś (feat. Toby J)	"Wanna live"	Non-album singles
2016	PawL & Ptyś (feat. KaRRamBa)	"Życie jest piękne"	Non-album singles
2016	WG x DIEGO	"Pasja"	W Drodze Mixtape
2016	WG x DIEGO	"Promienie Słońca"	Ponad Horyzont

== Internet distribution ==
The uncensored episodes are available to watch on the MTV Play app the day after episodes are aired. Since 28 February 2016 the show is streaming on Polish streaming website - Player.pl.
