= Warsaw Shore series 5 =

Warsaw Shore
- Season 5
- No. of episodes: 16

Release
- Original network: MTV; Player international
- Original release: 28 February – 26 June 2016

Series chronology
- ← Previous; Series 4: Summer Camp Next → Series 6: Summer Camp 2

The fifth series of Warsaw Shore, a Polish television programme based in Warsaw, Poland was announced on 13 November 2015. The fifth season began airing on 28 February 2016. This was the first series not to include Alan Kwieciński, who left the show at the end of the previous series and was the first to feature twin brothers – Pauly and Pietro Kluk in his place. This series marks the return of Ewelina Kubiak as a main cast member. Ahead of the series it was confirmed that the series would be filmed in Wrocław. On 18 April 2016 it was announced that original cast member Anna Ryśnik had quit the show and that this would be her last series.

== Cast ==
- Anna Ryśnik (Episodes 1–8)
- Damian Zduńczyk
- Ewelina Kubiak (Episodes 5–16)
- Jakub Henke
- Klaudia Stec
- Magda Pyznar
- Anna "Mała" Aleksandrzak
- Paweł Kluk
- Piotr Kluk
- Wojciech Gola

=== Duration of cast ===
Cast members	Series 5															
Cast members	1	2	3	4	5	6	7	8	9	10	11	12	13	14	15	16
Anna																
Damian																
Ewelina																
Jakub																
Klaudia																
Magda																
Mała																
Paweł																
Piotr																
Wojciech																

=== Notes ===
Key: = "Cast member" is featured in this episode.
Key: = "Cast member" arrives in the house.
Key: = "Cast member" leaves the series.
Key: = "Cast member" returns to the series.
Key: = "Cast member" is not a cast member in this episode.

== Episodes ==
No. overall	No. in season	Title	Duration	Original release date	Polish viewers (thousands)
53	1	"Episode 1"	60 minutes	28 February 2016	108 038
The team arrives in Wrocław. They are curious about the new members. It turns out to be twins Pauly and Piotr. They immediately become friends with Damian, who is single again after his breakup with Marta. Meanwhile Magda and Mała convince Anna to let loose.
54	2	"Episode 2"	60 minutes	6 March 2016	130 592
Mała, Wojtek, and Piotr play a prank on Pauly when he is asleep. The team goes to their workplace, which will be a bar. The boys try to get the attention of the beautiful bar owner. The group goes to their first club event this season.
55	3	"Episode 3"	60 minutes	13 March 2016	141 390
After a wild night, the team wakes up to a big mess. Klaudia and Magda start a prank war with the twins. Later everybody takes part in an Escape Room challenge. Ptyś is injured at the club and goes to the hospital.
56	4	"Episode 4"	60 minutes	20 March 2016	N/A
Jacek has a serious talk with the team about Ptyś's accident and the behaviour of Damian and the twins at work. The group watches the previous season together. Wojtek is embarrassed during scenes of his romance with Mała. Magda comforts Mała when Wojtek's behaviour upsets her.
57	5	"Episode 5"	60 minutes	27 March 2016	N/A
After a long night everybody sleeps in. As a result Wojtek, Magda, and Mała don't go to work. The girls decide to get revenge on Wojtek. Ewelina arrives at the house. Everybody is happy about her return, except for Anna.
58	6	"Episode 6"	60 minutes	3 April 2016	N/A
Anna, Magda, and Klaudia have a fun night at home. Meanwhile everyone else goes to the club to celebrate Ewelina rejoining the team. They return to the house with several women. Wojtek decides to reconcile with Magda and Mała.
59	7	"Episode 7"	60 minutes	10 April 2016	N/A
The team goes to a pub to watch a football match between Poland and the Czech Republic. Damian and Pauly get into a fight, leaving Piotr caught in the middle. The next day the group starts their new job at a beauty salon. Anna gives Ptyś a lesson in painting nails.
60	8	"Episode 8"	60 minutes	17 April 2016	N/A
The team organizes a surprise birthday party for Damian. After the celebration they go to a club where Anna has a big fight with the twins. Ptyś comforts her on the way home. The next day Mała, Wojtek, and Ewelina give each other spa treatments at work. Klaudia and Magda are very sick. Anna decides to leave the show.
61	9	"Episode 9"	60 minutes	24 April 2016	N/A
The boys all have a great time at the club. Back at the house, the girls decide to play a prank. They hide the boys' mattresses. The plan backfires for Klaudia when Ptyś takes her to his bed. Mała believes there is a ghost in the house. The next day the team goes to a winery in Zielona Góra
62	10	"Episode 10"	60 minutes	8 May 2016	N/A
The team travels to Berlin. They spend the day learning about German culture. In the hotel room the boys prank the girls by locking them in the washroom. At night it's time to attend a party. With Wojtek's help, Magda has a great evening with somebody she met at the club.
63	11	"Episode 11"	60 minutes	15 May 2016	N/A
The group takes a boat tour then drinks a lot of beer at a restaurant. After Piotr upsets her at a club, Mała breaks down. Wojtek tries to help, but she asks him to leave her alone. The next day the team returns to Wrocław.
64	12	"Episode 12"	60 minutes	22 May 2016	N/A
Everybody gets new tattoos when an artist visits the house. As punishment for missing work, Mała, Magda, Klaudia, and Wojtek work on a horse farm. Damian finds a smelly surprise under his bed. The team visits Szklarska Poręba.
65	13	"Episode 13"	60 minutes	29 May 2016	N/A
The team learns about old traditions in the mountains. Later on there is a wild pool party. After returning home, they clean up the house. Mała and Piotr bond during a night out. Damian and Pauly worry that they are losing their friend to love.
66	14	"Episode 14"	60 minutes	5 June 2016	N/A
During a girls' night out, Mała advises Ewelina to let go of the past and enjoy life. The next day they go skating with Damian and the twins. Ewelina and Pauly get closer. After a fight with the girls, Wojtek and Ptyś destroy the door to the sleep room. Jacek comes to the house and says he is concerned about the recent aggressions between the team members. He sends the boys to work at a candy shop to make treats for the girls.
67	15	"Episode 15"	60 minutes	19 June 2016	N/A
There is a wild party at a club with fans. The twins drink too much and have trouble waking up the next morning. The team rides in race cars. Wojtek and Ptyś help Damian dye his hair red. The girls have a contest with the lollipops the boys made.
68	16	"Episode 16"	60 minutes	26 June 2016	N/A
The team hosts a costume party at the house. Damian has a lot of fun with a female guest. Ewelina's cat woman outfit makes a big impression on Wojtek. Ptyś destroys the wall of the sleep room. The next morning the team is shocked by the mess they made. Before going home there is a big clean up.
