= Warsaw Shore: Summer Camp =

- No. of episodes: 12

Release
- Original network: MTV
- Original release: 11 October 2015 – 3 January 2016

Season chronology
- ← Previous; Series 3 Next → Series 5

The fourth series of Warsaw Shore, a Polish television programme based in Warsaw was confirmed on 13 July 2015. The show began on 11 October 2015. This is the first series not to include original cast members Paweł Cattaneo and Ewelina Kubiak, who leaves at the end of the previous series. This series marks the return of Jakub Henke as main cast member. Ahead of the series it was confirmed that the series would be filmed in a Polish seaside town Łeba. This was the final series to include cast member Alan Kwieciński.

== Cast ==
- Alan Kwieciński
- Anna Ryśnik
- Damian Zduńczyk
- Jakub Henke
- Klaudia Stec
- Magda Pyznar
- Anna "Mała" Aleksandrzak
- Wojciech Gola

=== Duration of cast ===
Cast members	Series 4: Summer Camp											
Cast members	1	2	3	4	5	6	7	8	9	10	11	12
Alan												
Anna												
Damian												
Jakub												
Klaudia												
Magda												
Mała												
Wojciech												

=== Notes ===
Key: = "Cast member" is featured in this episode.
Key: = "Cast member" voluntarily leaves the house.
Key: = "Cast member" leaves and returns to the house in the same episode.
Key: = "Cast member" returns to the house.
Key: = "Cast member" leaves the series.
Key: = "Cast member" returns to the series.

== Episodes ==
No. overall	No. in season	Title	Duration	Original release date	Polish viewers (thousands)
41	1	"Episode 1"	60 minutes	11 October 2015	90 105
Jacek sends everyone a message that they have to immediately go to Łeba. Some of them have complications, but everyone eventually gets to the house. Ptyś returns to the team. Klaudia brings her Yorkshire Terrier named Gangster. Anna and Mała share an intimate moment while Magda and Alan end up in the sleep room. Damian unsuccessfully tries to impress the girls. The team takes part in a parade.
42	2	"Episode 2"	60 minutes	18 October 2015	121 596
Damian loses his meter during a wild night out. Klaudia and Ptyś get closer. The team starts their new job at a beach bar. Later on they go horseback riding. At the club Alan has enough of Damian's behaviour and hits him. Anna comforts Damian on the way home.
43	3	"Episode 3"	60 minutes	1 November 2015	118 022
Alan gets into an argument with Magda and Mała. He packs up his bags and leaves. In the morning the boys are exhausted and skip work. Alan returns to the house with gifts for Magda and Mała. Jacek gives the group a lecture on responsibility.
44	4	"Episode 4"	60 minutes	8 November 2015	N/A
Mała and Wojtek sleep together as do Klaudia and Ptyś. The same night Alan and Damian bring several women home. The next day Klaudia has an accident involving the infamous elephant sculpture. The boys face a difficult punishment for not going to work while the girls go to the beautician.
45	5	"Episode 5"	60 minutes	15 November 2015	144 918
Magda and Anna try to convince Damian to get dressed. Mała and Wojtek spend more time in the sleep room. Anna's mother calls and asks her to come home. She leaves the house. The team has a fun night at the beach until an argument ruins the mood.
46	6	"Episode 6"	60 minutes	22 November 2015	N/A
The team accidentally floods the kitchen when trying to add water to the pool. Mała is jealous when Wojtek dances with another woman. Magda and Wojtek are the winners of a go-kart race. Anna returns to the house.
47	7	"Episode 7"	60 minutes	29 November 2015	N/A
Jacek is upset because of the mess in the house. He sends the group on a camping trip in the forest. The boys want to go sleep early. Unfortunately, the girls are very drunk and loud. Wojtek has enough and takes down the tents.
48	8	"Episode 8"	60 minutes	6 December 2015	144 300
Jacek finds out that Ptyś and Klaudia were drunk at work. Wojtek opens up about his recent health problems. He won't be leaving, but cannot drink alcohol. Everybody supports him, saying it is most important that he stays.
49	9	"Episode 9"	60 minutes	13 December 2015	129 463
Emotions run high during a night at the club. Ptyś is devastated after a fight with Klaudia. Damian and Alan also argue. The next day Damian surprises his friend Marta with flowers. The team takes part in a labyrinth race.
50	10	"Episode 10"	60 minutes	20 December 2015	N/A
The team organizes a romantic evening for Damian and Marta. Klaudia helps a garbage collector as punishment for getting drunk at work. Ptyś was supposed to join her, but is still very drunk from the previous night.
51	11	"Episode 11"	60 minutes	27 December 2015	N/A
Jacek is happy that Ptyś cleaned the house and believes he learned his lesson. The team goes windsurfing. Anna is annoyed when her boyfriend shows up while the team is at the club. Ptyś celebrates his birthday.
52	12	"Episode 12"	60 minutes	3 January 2016	N/A
The team is asked to prepare lunch for surprise guests. Trybson and Eliza visit the house. There is a beach party to celebrate Summer Camp. One guest throws a glass at Magda. Anna comes to her rescue. In the morning the team reluctantly leaves the house.
