= Warsaw Shore series 13 =

Polish television programme

Warsaw Shore
- Season 13
- No. of episodes: 13

Release
- Original network: MTV; Player international
- Original release: 6 September – 14 October 2020

Series chronology
- ← Previous; Series 12 Next → Series 14

The thirteenth series of Warsaw Shore, a Polish television programme based in Warsaw, Poland was announced in January 2020. The series was scheduled to premiere on 29 March 2020, but was postponed due to the COVID-19 pandemic and rescheduled to another date. The new start date was 6 September 2020 and episodes began airing on Sunday and Wednesday. Ahead of the series it was announced that new cast members Milena Łaszek and Marceli Szklanny had joined the series. This is the first series not to include original cast members Anna "Mała" Aleksandrzak and Damian "Stifler" Zduńczyk, who had quit the show after the previous series. The series also featured the return of Damian "Dzik" Graf. Nathan Henry participant of Geordie Shore had a special participation during episodes eleven and twelve, it is the first time that a participant of said program is part of Warsaw Shore after the first season.

== Cast ==
- Anastasiya Yandaltsava
- Damian "Dzik" Graf
- Radosław "Diva" Majchrowski
- Ewa Piekut
- Ewelina Kubiak
- Gábor "Gabo" Szabó
- Joanna Bałdys
- Kasjusz "Don Kasjo" Życiński
- Marceli Szklanny
- Milena Łaszek
- Patryk Spiker
- Piotr Polak

=== Special guest ===
- Nathan Henry (Episodes 11–12)

=== Duration of cast ===
Cast members	Series 13												
Cast members	1	2	3	4	5	6	7	8	9	10	11	12	13
Anastasiya													
Damian G													
Diva													
Ewa													
Ewelina													
Gabo													
Joanna													
Kasjusz													
Marceli													
Milena													
Patryk													
Piotr													

=== Notes ===
Key: = "Cast member" is featured in this episode.
Key: = "Cast member" arrives in the house.
Key: = "Cast member" leaves and returns to the house in the same episode.
Key: = "Cast member" returns to the series.
Key: = "Cast member" leaves the series.

== Episodes ==
No. overall	No. in season	Title	Original release date	Viewers (millions)
155	1	"Episode 1"	6 September 2020	TBA
The team reunites in Warsaw. Dzik returns to the show, to the delight of his friends. New members Marceli and Milena meet them at the house. The partying starts right away. Asia and Gabo look after Milena when she drinks too much. Don Kasjo and Asia share a kiss.
156	2	"Episode 2"	9 September 2020	TBA
At the club Spiker gets very drunk and starts an "ice fight." Anastasiya tries to get Don Kasjo's attention. However, he only has eyes for Asia. She is sad until Gabo comes to the rescue. The next morning, Jacek sends the team to their first attraction: a unique Escape Room.
157	3	"Episode 3"	13 September 2020	TBA
Ewelina and Marceli bond during a night out. Asia and Don Kasjo have a fight after he flirts with another woman. The argument continues at the house, leaving Asia in tears. Milena comforts her and gives advice. The next day Ewelina, Diva, and Spiker go to work for a dog groomer.
158	4	"Episode 4"	16 September 2020	TBA
Marceli's moonshine receives a mixed reception from the team. Anastasiya gets into a fight during a night out. Back at the house, Dzik and Don Kasjo have an argument. The party continues in the pool. Anastasiya, Ewa, and Ewelina team up to play a prank on the boys. One guest stays the night.
159	5	"Episode 5"	20 September 2020	TBA
A bungee jumping attraction comes to the Warsaw Shore house. Asia and Don Kasjo are forced to go to work together at a restaurant. During a night out, Ewa and Dzik reconcile while Milena and Gabo deepen their friendship. Marceli dances with Anastasiya, which causes a disagreement between him and Diva.
160	6	"Episode 6"	23 September 2020	TBA
After a long night, the team is waken up early for aqua-fit training. Ewa, Gabo, and Marceli have a hard work day at the hardware store. During a zoo visit, Don Kasjo is afraid of the small animals. Anastasiya is in her element on a group date at a fancy restaurant. Ewa and Ewelina host a spontaneous house party.
161	7	"Episode 7"	27 September 2020	TBA
Milena runs into trouble while zip lining. Gabo's appetite makes a big impression on the team. Anastasiya celebrates her birthday at a club in Kielce. Meanwhile, Ewelina is very jealous when Marceli kisses another woman. She decides to have fun with Gabo. Asia and Ewa have a fight.
162	8	"Episode 8"	30 September 2020	TBA
Dzik shows off his fighting skills in a Sumo match. The girls have a serious conversation about what happened the previous night. Jacek is disappointed about the team's recent aggression. Anastasiya and Gabo spend an evening at home. They decide to play a prank. Milena is too drunk to go to the party. Later she wakes up in a pile of mattresses. A romantic gesture from Don Kasjo rekindles his romance with Asia.
163	9	"Episode 9"	4 October 2020	TBA
Anastasiya receives a helicopter ride as a birthday present. She asks Diva to accompany her. Marceli takes Ewelina out on a romantic date. The team gets creative during a night out. Milena meets up with her friends and introduces them to Asia. Back at the house, Ewelina and Marceli spend the night in the sleep room.
164	10	"Episode 10"	7 October 2020	TBA
The team goes roller skating. Asia and Pedro play a prank on Don Kasjo while he is sleeping. The boys attend a ballet class. At a costume party, Milena gets closer with Don Kasjo. Gabo's night out goes wrong and he ends up in the hospital.
165	11	"Episode 11"	11 October 2020	TBA
The team receives a special visitor: Nathan from Geordie Shore. Diva and Anastasiya are very interested in their English guest. Later, Ewa catches Spiker in bed with Nathan. Marceli and Ewelina spend a night at the house while the rest of the team goes to a party.
166	12	"Episode 12"	14 October 2020	TBA
After a fight with Nathan, Anastasiya avoids the team. However, everybody reconciles before a big house party. Several guests from past seasons come. Ptyś brings several friends. Bartek and Anna Tokarska have fallen in love and gotten engaged. Alan immediately befriends Nathan. Anastasiya and Ewelina have a fight. Ewa defends Ewelina.
167	13	"Episode 13"	14 October 2020 (Player.pl)	TBA
The team reunites in Poznań to support Dzik in a competition. Marceli and Ewelina have moved in together. However, she believes Dzik is trying to ruin their relationship. At the event, former members Ptyś, Trybson, Eliza, Julia, Filip, Wojtek, and Stifler join them. Ewelina supports Dzik's opponent. After losing, he publicly insults her. Most of the team is disappointed in Dzik. However, Don Kasjo stays loyal to his best friend. Ewelina leaves the hotel the team is staying at. Before leaving Poznań, she meets Marceli for a serious discussion.
