= Warsaw Shore: Summer Camp 2 series 6 =

Warsaw Shore: Summer Camp 2
- Season 6
- No. of episodes: 12

Release
- Original network: MTV; Player international
- Original release: 28 August – 13 November 2016

Series chronology
- ← Previous; Series 5 Next → Series 7: Winter Camp

The sixth series of Warsaw Shore, a Polish television programme based in Warsaw, Poland was announced on 16 June 2016. The sixth season began airing on 28 August 2016. This was the first series not to include Anna Ryśnik since she made her exit during the previous series. Ewelina Kubiak and twin brothers Pauly and Pietro Kluk also left the show and was the first to feature new cast members Aleksandra Smoleń and Piotr Polak. Ahead of the series it was confirmed that the series would be filmed in Mielno. On 20 October 2016 it was announced that Klaudia Stec had quit the show mid-series and was replaced by new cast member Ewelina "Młoda" Bańkowska.

== Cast ==
- Aleksandra Smoleń
- Damian Zduńczyk
- Jakub Henke
- Klaudia Stec (Episodes 1–6)
- Magda Pyznar
- Anna "Mała" Aleksandrzak
- Ewelina "Młoda" Bańkowska (Episodes 9–12)
- Piotr Polak
- Wojciech Gola

=== Duration of cast ===
Cast members	Series 6: Summer Camp											
Cast members	1	2	3	4	5	6	7	8	9	10	11	12
Aleksandra												
Damian												
Jakub												
Klaudia												
Magda												
Mała												
Młoda												
Piotr												
Wojciech												

=== Notes ===
Key: = "Cast member" is featured in this episode.
Key: = "Cast member" arrives in the house.
Key: = "Cast member" voluntarily leaves the house.
Key: = "Cast member" returns to the house.
Key: = "Cast member" leaves the series.
Key: = "Cast member" is not a cast member in this episode.

== Episodes ==
No. overall	No. in season	Title	Duration	Original release date	Polish viewers (thousands)
69	1	"Episode 1"	60 minutes	28 August 2016	90 000
The team goes to Mielno for an unforgettable summer. On the way Damian tells his friends about his girlfriend Paulina. New members Ola and Piotr meet the rest of the group at the house. Jacek invites the team to his birthday party.
70	2	"Episode 2"	60 minutes	4 September 2016	N/A
Everybody gets very drunk at the party. Ptyś tries to break up a fight between Ola and Mała on the way home. In the morning Piotr, Ola, Ptyś, and Klaudia start their job at a boating company. After work the rest of the team joins them on the beach. They take the inflatable banana for a ride in the sea.
71	3	"Episode 3"	60 minutes	11 September 2016	N/A
The team goes to a Disco Polo night at the club. Piotr has a wardrobe malfunction. Damian is tempted by a beautiful woman, but decides to remain loyal to Paulina. The next day Wojtek and Damian beat Magda and Mała in a friendly competition at work.
72	4	"Episode 4"	60 minutes	18 September 2016	N/A
Ola and Piotr take part in an initiation prepared by the rest of the group. Damian receives a surprise visit from Paulina. The team goes to a Western Fair where Magda lasts the longest on the mechanical bull. Later on the girls go to a very fancy restaurant while the boys work at a kebab stand.
73	5	"Episode 5"	60 minutes	25 September 2016	N/A
Ola and Ptyś get closer during a night at the club. Klaudia reunites with an old friend. Damian has a fight with Paulina. Mała convinces him to apologize. He manages to stop Paulina from leaving the house. The team goes zip lining. With Piotr's help, Magda and Klaudia play a prank on Damian.
74	6	"Episode 6"	60 minutes	2 October 2016	N/A
At the club Piotr takes a girl to the toilets. An argument between Klaudia and Damian turns into a big fight involving the entire group. Ola and Magda switch vehicles with Wojtek on the way home. Ptyś destroys the door to the boys' bedroom. Mała unsuccessfully tries to defuse tensions. Paulina leaves the house in tears. Damian decides to go with her to save their relationship. In the morning everyone feels remorseful about their behaviour. Klaudia decides to leave the show.
75	7	"Episode 7"	60 minutes	9 October 2016	135 000
Wojtek runs into an ex-girlfriend at the club. Ptyś brings several fans back to the house. He wants to take them to the sleep room. Unfortunately, they are more interested in talking to Mała. Damian returns to the house with Paulina.
76	8	"Episode 8"	60 minutes	16 October 2016	N/A
Piotr and Ptyś have a successful night. Magda is upset when she comes home to a wet bed. She has a fight with Piotr and the bedroom door suffers further damage. In the morning Jacek visits the house and orders Magda and Piotr to clean up. The rest of the team goes on a trip to a houseboat.
77	9	"Episode 9"	60 minutes	23 October 2016	N/A
Młoda joins the team. Ola quickly bonds with the new girl. On the way home from a club, Magda and Młoda argue with Piotr. Wojtek and Ola try to calm them down. Damian invites Ptyś to a burger place. During lunch Ptyś gives Damian some relationship advice. Ola and Młoda spray paint the walls.
78	10	"Episode 10"	60 minutes	30 October 2016	N/A
At the club Damian performs his signature dance move for the last time. Magda and Piotr spend the night in the sleep room. Ola and Młoda get into a fight, which entertains the other team members. Jacek is not pleased and tells them to sort out their differences politely.
79	11	"Episode 11"	60 minutes	6 November 2016	N/A
Ptyś and Młoda get closer. The team works in pairs in a fun competition at a fast food place. At night buzzing insects disrupt everybody's sleep. The next day they take a trip to Gdynia. After exercising at a trampoline gym, they take a relaxing boat trip.
80	12	"Episode 12"	60 minutes	13 November 2016	N/A
Ola and Mała are the winners of the fast food competition. Their reward is a helicopter ride. Magda and Piotr take a ride on a hang glider. The Kluk twins visit the house right in time for a party. Młoda is jealous when Ptyś's female friends talk to him. During the last night at the house, several members of the team get into fights. In the morning everybody reconciles before leaving.
