= MTV Polska =

Polish-language general entertainment channel

MTV Poland
- Country: Poland

Programming
- Picture format: 1080i HDTV (downscaled to 16:9 576i for the SDTV feed)

Ownership
- Owner: Skydance Europe

History
- Launched: 7 July 2000; 26 years ago
- Replaced: Atomic TV

Links
- Website: mtv.pl

MTV Poland is the Polish version of the general entertainment channel MTV. It was launched on July 7, 2000, replacing local music channel Atomic TV. The channel is operated by Paramount Networks EMEAA from its headquarters in Warsaw.

== History ==
The channel broadcasts a number of programming in Polish with either subtitled or dubbed programming from the American and British versions of MTV. The channel is complemented by the local Polish channel MTV Music.

The television broadcasts its programming 24 hours a day, reaching over four million homes across Poland via cable networks and the Cyfrowy Polsat, nc+, and Orange TV platforms. VH1 also operated in Poland, airing older music videos from the 1980s and 1990s, though it also featured songs by artists from the new millennium.

On July 17, 2012, the channel started to broadcast in 16:9 picture format.

On 22 March 2017, the channel began broadcasting in high definition (HD). Two months later, on May 22, the SD version was switched off from the Eutelsat Hot Bird 13E satellite. Since then, only MTV Poland HD has been broadcast from this position.

On September 4, 2018, MTV Poland unified its schedule with the pan-European version, leaving the Polish window between 22:00 CET and 2:00 CET.

The channel was till 17 February 2021 under the jurisdiction of Dutch broadcasting regulator Commissariaat Voor De Media. Since February 2021, MTV Polska has used a broadcasting license from the Czech Republic of RRTV. The channel became a kind of hybrid and has since been available in Hungary, for example, where it shares its time with the local MTV Hungary channel, and commercial breaks are replaced to suit local needs.

As of 31 December 2025, MTV Poland broadcast the "M is for Music" music video series for the last time, the last music video broadcast was "Where Are U Now" Skrillex and Diplo Present Jack U ft. Justin Bieber.

Since January 1, 2026, the channel stopped broadcasting ads.
