= Lists of actors by television series =

This is a list of lists of cast members of television series.

== A ==
- List of All That cast members
- List of The Andy Griffith Show guest stars
- List of Ang Probinsyano guest stars
- List of Are You Afraid of the Dark? cast members
- List of Arrested Development cast members
- List of Arrowverse cast members
- List of Arrowverse cast members
- List of Awake cast members

== B ==
- List of Batman television series cast members
- List of previous The Bold and the Beautiful cast members
- List of Brooklyn Nine-Nine cast members

== C ==
- List of Chuck cast members
- List of CID (Indian TV series) cast members
- List of cast members from The City (2008 TV series)
- List of comedy and variety television programs with LGBT cast members
- List of Curb Your Enthusiasm guest stars

== D ==
- List of Dallas (1978 TV series) cast members
- List of Dalziel and Pascoe cast members
- List of DC Extended Universe cast members
- List of The Den cast members
- List of Desperate Housewives cast members
- List of Doctor Who cast members

== E ==
- List of El Señor de los Cielos cast members
- List of En otra piel cast members
- List of Ex on the Beach cast members

== F ==
- List of Family Affairs cast members
- List of Family Guy guest stars
- List of Fawlty Towers cast members

== G ==
- List of Gargoyles cast members
- List of Geordie Shore cast members
- List of Gimme Gimme Gimme cast members
- List of previous General Hospital cast members
- List of Gogglebox cast members
- List of Goin' Bulilit cast members
- List of Grey's Anatomy cast members
- List of Gunsmoke cast members

== H ==
- List of Hellraiser cast members
- List of Heroes cast members
- List of The Hills cast members

== I ==
- List of In Living Color cast members
- List of In Plain Sight cast members

== J ==
- List of Jackass cast members
- List of Journeyman cast members

== K ==
- List of guest stars on King of the Hill

== L ==
- List of Laguna Beach: The Real Orange County cast members
- List of The Larry Sanders Show guest stars
- List of Leave It to Beaver cast members
- List of Les Rois maudits cast members and episodes
- List of Lost cast members

== M ==
- List of Mad TV cast members
- List of Made in Chelsea cast members
- List of Malhação cast members
- List of Marido en alquiler cast members
- List of M*A*S*H cast members
- List of Monk cast members
- List of Morangos com Açúcar cast members
- List of My Love from the Star (2017 TV series) guest stars
- List of MythBusters cast members

== N ==
- List of Nashville cast members
- List of Non-Summit cast members

== O ==
- List of The Office (American TV series) characters
- List of Once Upon a Time cast members

== P ==
- List of Pari 'Koy guest stars
- List of Passions characters and cast
- List of Percy Jackson & the Olympians cast members
- List of Police Academy cast members
- List of Prison Break cast members
- List of Prisoner cast members

== R ==
- List of The Real Housewives cast members
- List of Real World cast members
- List of reality television programs with LGBT cast members

== S ==
- List of Saturday Night Live cast members
- List of School series cast members
- List of Scream (TV series) cast members
- List of Señora Acero cast members
- List of Sliders cast members
- List of South Park cast members
- List of SpongeBob SquarePants cast members
- List of Star Trek: Deep Space Nine cast members
- List of Star Trek: Discovery cast members
- List of Star Trek: Enterprise cast members
- List of Star Trek: The Next Generation cast members
- List of Star Trek: The Original Series cast members
- List of The Sullivans cast members
- List of Sunset Beach cast members

== T ==
- List of Texas cast members
- List of That '70s Show cast members
- List of Tierra de reyes cast members
- List of Tinker Bell cast members
- List of Toda Max guest stars
- List of The Twilight Zone (1959 TV series) guest stars

== V ==
- List of cast members of Verbotene Liebe

== W ==
- List of Warsaw Shore cast members
- List of WWE Raw guest stars

== See also ==
- Lists of actors
