= List of Warsaw Shore cast members =

This article contains a full list of cast members that appear on Warsaw Shore.

== Cast members ==
Cast member	Quote	Translation	Series	Episodes	Year
Ewelina Kubiak	"Ja robię rozpierduchę, ja!" (1–3, 5, 7–14) "Królewska para..." (16)	"I am making a mess, me! (1–3, 5, 7–14) "The royal couple..." (16)	1–3, 5, 7–14, 16	164	2013–21
Anna "Mała" Aleksandrzak	"Jestem mała, ale jak ci przywalę to się zdziwisz."	"I may be small, but you'll be surprised after I hit you."	1–12, 20	145	2013–19, 2024
Wojciech Gola	"Liczy się mega pompa."	"What matters is the mega pump."	1–10, 12	113	2013–2019
Anna Ryśnik	"Męża szukam, miłości szukam."	"I'm looking for a husband, I'm looking for love."	1–5	60	2013–16
Paweł Cattaneo	"Jestem nie tylko przystojny, ale i świetnie wyposażony."	"I am not only handsome, but very well equipped."	1–3	40	2013–15
Paweł "Trybson" Trybała	"Jestem największym pogromcą wszystkich gąsek."	"I am the greatest conqueror of all birds."	1, 2, 3	15	2013–15
Eliza Wesołowska	"Jestem naturalną pięknością."	"I am a natural beauty."	1, 2, 3	15	2013–15
Mariusz Śmietanowski	"Wszystkie dziewczyny i parkiety są moje i tylko moje."	"All girls and dance floors are mine and only mine."	1, 20	13	2013, 2024
Alan Kwieciński	"Będą cycki, będzie ostro."	"If there are boobs, it will be hardcore."	2–4, 7, 9, 10, 15, 17, 18	75	2014–15, 2017–18, 2021–23
Jakub "Ptyś" Henke	"Jedyne czego ja odmawiam to pacierza."	"The only thing I say no to is prayers."	2, 4–7, 9, 10, 12	73	2014–2019
Malwina Pycka	"Wszystko się może zdarzyć."	"Anything can happen."	2	7	2014
Alicja Herodzińska	"W tym domu są zasady, ale mnie one nie obowiązują."	"In this house there are rules, but they do not apply to me."	2	5	2014
Damian "Stifler" Zduńczyk	"Żadna się nie oprze moim tatuażom."	"No one can resist my tattoos."	3–12, 20	128	2015–19, 2024
Klaudia Stec	"Jestem skandalistką z ostrym temperamentem."	"I'm a scandalous girl with a hot temper."	3–7, 10–11	74	2015–19
Magdalena Pyznar	"Ze mną przeżyjesz najlepszą imprezę w swoim życiu."	"With me you will experience the best party of your life."	3–7	68	2015–17
Piotr Kluk	"Uwiedź, przeleć, porzuć."	"Seduce, hook up, give up."	5, 10	17	2016, 2018
Paweł Kluk	"Uwiedź, przeleć, porzuć."	"Seduce, hook up, give up."	5	16	2016
Piotr "Pedro" Polak	"Strzelałem gole na boisku, strzelam też na baletach."	"I shot goals on court, I shoot also at ballets."	6–14, 15, 16, 20	111	2016–21, 2024
Aleksandra Smoleń	"Nikt nie będzie mi mówił co ja mam robić."	"No one will tell me what to do."	6, 10, 11	17	2016, 2018–19
Ewelina "Młoda" Bańkowska	"Młoda rządzi się swoimi prawami."	"The young one has her own rules."	6–7, 10	11	2016–18
Marcin "Brzydal" Maruszak	"Mówią na mnie „Brzydal”, bo lubię się brzydko zabawić."	"They call me „Ugly”, because I like to play ugly."	8–10	35	2017–18
Wiktoria Sypucińska	"Lepiej być spóźnioną niż nieumalowaną."	"It's better to be late than not made-up."	8–9, 10	27	2017–18
Jola Mróz	"Odpalam się jak petarda."	"I'm burning like a firecracker."	8–9	18	2017–18
Jacek Bystry	"Halo! Hop, hop!"	"Hello! Hop, hop!"	8–9	17	2017–18
Bartlomej "Bartek" Barański	"Dbam o formę nie tylko na siłowni."	"I take care of my form not only in the gym."	8, 10	13	2017–2018
Anna "Andzia" Papierz	"Jestem miłą dziewczyną z wrednym charakterkiem."	"I'm a nice girl with a nasty character."	8	10	2017
Kamila Widz	—N/a	—N/a	8, 10	6	2017–2018
Mariusz "Ryjek" Adam †	—N/a	—N/a	8–9	4	2017–18
Ilona Borowska	—N/a	—N/a	8	3	2017
Patryk Spiker	"Jeśli wkurza cię to, co mówię, to nie chcesz wiedzieć, co myślę."	"If you are annoyed by what I say, you do not want to know what I think."	10–21	147	2018–24
Julia Kruzer	"Na trzeźwo robię to czego wy nie robicie nawet po pijaku."	"I do sober what you won't even do while drunk."	10, 20, 21	16	2018, 2024
Klaudia "Czaja" Czajkowska	"Ja tutaj rozdaję karty."	"I'm dealing the cards here."	10–11	15	2018–19
Filip Ćwiek	"Diabeł mówi baw się śmiało."	"The devil says have fun."	10	12	2018
Kasjusz "Don Kasjo" Życiński	"Pokażę Ci sto jeden twarzy Don Kasjo."	"I'll show you the one hundred and one faces of Don Kasjo."	11–16, 18, 20	81	2019–21, 2023–24
Ewa Piekut	"Za dnia zakonnica, a w nocy rozpustnica."	"A nun during the day, a wanton at night."	11–15	63	2019–21
Damian "Dzik" Graf	"Vixa Gaz Mielonka."	"Party, gas, luncheon meat."	11–15, 16, 18	63	2019–21, 2023
Anastasiya Yandaltsava	"Żadna dziewczyna nie może się ze mną równać."	"No girl can compare to me."	11–13	38	2019–20
Radosław "Diva" Majchrowski	"Wszystkie dziwy i dziwa, wasza matka - Diva."	"All wild ones, your mother - Diva."	12–16, 17, 20	62	2019–22, 2024
Joanna "Asia" Bałdys	"Ciężko o hamulec, kiedy mam ochotę ulec."	"It's hard to stop, when I want to give in."	12–14	30	2019–20
Gábor "Gabo" Szabó	—N/a	"It's Pumped Gabo in the house, bro."	12–13	26	2019–20
Anna Tokarska	—N/a	—N/a	12	9	2019
Aleksandr "Sasha" Muzheiko	—N/a	—N/a	12	6	2019
Paweł Hałabuda	—N/a	—N/a	12	4	2019
Milena Łaszek	"Wolę być sama, niż w objęciach chama." (13–17) "Już nie jestem sama, tylko w objęciach chama." (18) "W końcu jestem sama, a nie w objęciach chama." (19)	"I would rather be alone, than with uncultured people."	13–19	86	2020–23
Marceli Szklanny	"Odpalony!"	"Fired up!"	13	13	2020
Kinga Gondorowicz	"Dla jednych baby girl, dla drugich bad bitch."	"Baby girl for some people, bad bitch for others."	14–15	24	2020–21
Maciek Szczukiewicz	"W tych dziwnych czasach, dobrze być pojebanym."	"In these strange times, it's good to be unusual."	14–15	24	2020–21
Daniel "Arnold" Jabłoński	"Czy te oczy mogą kłamać?" (14) "...jest tylko jedna" (16)	"Can these eyes lie?" (14) "...there is only one" (16)	14, 16	22	2020–21
Michał Eliszer	—N/a	—N/a	14, 15	7	2020–21
Paulina Karbowiak	—N/a	—N/a	14	4	2020
Lena Majewska	"Lena w klubie - driny w dzióbie."	"Lena in the club - drinks in the mouth."	15–20	69	2021–24
Jeremiasz "Jez" Szmigiel †	"Jak kupuje buty, to zawsze na rozmiar."	"When I buy shoes, it's always the right size."	15–17, 20–21	62	2021–22, 2024
Oliwia Dziatkiewicz	'"Zawsze w formie i na dobrej bombie."	"Always fit and on a good bomb."	15–18, 21	59	2021–24
Kamil Jagielski	"Za mundurem panny sznurem."	"Women love a man in uniform."	15–17, 20	36	2021–22, 2024
Patrycja Morkowska	"Seksowna i zjawiskowa, to ja - Twoja Królowa."	"Sexy and phenomenal, it's me - your Queen."	15–16, 20	29	2021, 2024
Dominik Raczkowski	"W tygodniu praca i biznesy, na weekend balety i ekscesy."	"Work and business during the week, ballets and excesses during the weekend."	15	8	2021
Michał "Sarna" Sarnowski	"Jak odpalić, to na pełnej petardzie!"	"When you light it up, use the whole firecracker!"	16–19	50	2021–23
Aleksandra "Ola" Okrzesik	"Lubię podkręcać nie tylko urodę."	"I like to enhance not only my beauty."	17–21	64	2022–24
Przemysław "Sequento" Skulski	"Sequento w gazie, jak nie to na razie!"	"Sequento has gas, if not then goodbye."	17–19	37	2022–23
Wiktoria "Jaszczur" Robert	"Albo mnie pokochasz, albo znienawidzisz."	"Either you love me or you hate me."	17–18	21	2022–23
Dominik Gul	—N/a	—N/a	17	2	2022
Małgorzata "Gosia" Jeziorowska	—N/a	—N/a	17	2	2022
Angelika Kramer	"Robię dramy, więc nie pogadamy."	"I create dramas, so we will not talk."	18–21	52	2023–24
Marcin "Mały" Pastuszka	"Jestem mały, ale mam w sobie dużo miłości."	"I am small, but I have a lot of love in me."	18–21	52	2023–24
Piotr "Piotrek" Nowakowski	"Górnik zawsze wchodzi najgłębiej."	"A miner always goes deepest"	18, 20	15	2023–24
Eliasz Zdzitowiecki	"Jestem szczery, nie dla mnie koperkowe afery."	"I'm honest, minor scandals are not for me."	18	13	2023
Ronaldo "Czarny Polak" Miranda	"Polska - Angola, Ronaldo strzela gola"	"Poland - Angola, Ronaldo scores a goal"	19, 20	17	2023–24
Iryna "Renatka" Maltseva	"Pokażę Ci moje kocie ruchy."	"I will show you my catty moves."	19	13	2023
Diana Mościcka	"Gdzie mój limit? Nie ma!"	"What is my limit? There is none!"	20–21	26	2024
Grzesiek Tomaszewski	"Barber wlatuje - życia kosztuje." (20) "Grzegorz wlatuje - życia kosztuje." (21)	"Barber arrives - life costs." (20) "Grzegorz arrives - life costs." (21)	20–21	26	2024
Olaf Majewski	"Robię żarty i to ja rozdaje karty."	"I make jokes and deal cards."	20	13	2024
Magda Pawińska	"Jest i ona - Madzia odklejona."	"It is her - Madzia undone."	20	13	2024
Julita Izdebska	"Niech się wstydzi ten, kto widzi."	—N/a	21	13	2024
Łukasz Budyń	"Turbodoładowanie - życie to wyzwanie."	—N/a	21	13	2024
Adam Mikołajczyk	—N/a	—N/a	21	12	2024
Michał Sewera	—N/a	—N/a	21	13	2024

== Duration of cast ==
Current cast members
Cast member	Series 1											Series 2													Series 3																Series 4												Series 5																Series 6												Series 7												Series 8												Series 9												Series 10												Series 11													Series 12													Series 13													Series 14												Series 15												Series 16												Series 17												Series 18													Series 19													Series 20													Series 21												
Cast member	1	2	3	4	5	6	7	8	9	10	11	1	2	3	4	5	6	7	8	9	10	11	12	13	1	2	3	4	5	6	7	8	9	10	11	12	13	14	15	16	1	2	3	4	5	6	7	8	9	10	11	12	1	2	3	4	5	6	7	8	9	10	11	12	13	14	15	16	1	2	3	4	5	6	7	8	9	10	11	12	1	2	3	4	5	6	7	8	9	10	11	12	1	2	3	4	5	6	7	8	9	10	11	12	1	2	3	4	5	6	7	8	9	10	11	12	1	2	3	4	5	6	7	8	9	10	11	12	1	2	3	4	5	6	7	8	9	10	11	12	13	1	2	3	4	5	6	7	8	9	10	11	12	13	1	2	3	4	5	6	7	8	9	10	11	12	13	1	2	3	4	5	6	7	8	9	10	11	12	1	2	3	4	5	6	7	8	9	10	11	12	1	2	3	4	5	6	7	8	9	10	11	12	1	2	3	4	5	6	7	8	9	10	11	12	1	2	3	4	5	6	7	8	9	10	11	12	13	1	2	3	4	5	6	7	8	9	10	11	12	13	1	2	3	4	5	6	7	8	9	10	11	12	13	1	2	3	4	5	6	7	8	9	10	11	12	13
Ewelina																																																																																																																																																																																																																																																																											
Anna A																																																																																																																																																																																																																																																																											
Wojciech																																																																																																																																																																																																																																																																											
Anna R																																																																																																																																																																																																																																																																											
Paweł C																																																																																																																																																																																																																																																																											
Trybson																																																																																																																																																																																																																																																																											
Eliza																																																																																																																																																																																																																																																																											
Mariusz																																																																																																																																																																																																																																																																											
Jakub																																																																																																																																																																																																																																																																											
Alan																																																																																																																																																																																																																																																																											
Alicja																																																																																																																																																																																																																																																																											
Malwina																																																																																																																																																																																																																																																																											
Damian Z																																																																																																																																																																																																																																																																											
Magdalena																																																																																																																																																																																																																																																																											
Klaudia S																																																																																																																																																																																																																																																																											
Piotr K																																																																																																																																																																																																																																																																											
Paweł K																																																																																																																																																																																																																																																																											
Piotr P																																																																																																																																																																																																																																																																											
Aleksandra S																																																																																																																																																																																																																																																																											
Młoda																																																																																																																																																																																																																																																																											
Marcin M																																																																																																																																																																																																																																																																											
Wiktoria S																																																																																																																																																																																																																																																																											
Jola																																																																																																																																																																																																																																																																											
Jacek																																																																																																																																																																																																																																																																											
Bartłomiej																																																																																																																																																																																																																																																																											
Andzia																																																																																																																																																																																																																																																																											
Kamila																																																																																																																																																																																																																																																																											
Ryjek																																																																																																																																																																																																																																																																											
Ilona																																																																																																																																																																																																																																																																											
Patryk																																																																																																																																																																																																																																																																											
Julia																																																																																																																																																																																																																																																																											
Filip																																																																																																																																																																																																																																																																											
Klaudia C																																																																																																																																																																																																																																																																											
Kasjusz																																																																																																																																																																																																																																																																											
Damian G																																																																																																																																																																																																																																																																											
Ewa																																																																																																																																																																																																																																																																											
Anastasiya																																																																																																																																																																																																																																																																											
Joanna																																																																																																																																																																																																																																																																											
Gabor																																																																																																																																																																																																																																																																											
Paweł H																																																																																																																																																																																																																																																																											
Radosław																																																																																																																																																																																																																																																																											
Anna T																																																																																																																																																																																																																																																																											
Sasha																																																																																																																																																																																																																																																																											
Milena																																																																																																																																																																																																																																																																											
Marceli																																																																																																																																																																																																																																																																											
Kinga																																																																																																																																																																																																																																																																											
Maciek																																																																																																																																																																																																																																																																											
Paulina																																																																																																																																																																																																																																																																											
Daniel																																																																																																																																																																																																																																																																											
Michał E																																																																																																																																																																																																																																																																											
Lena																																																																																																																																																																																																																																																																											
Jeremiasz																																																																																																																																																																																																																																																																											
Oliwia																																																																																																																																																																																																																																																																											
Kamil																																																																																																																																																																																																																																																																											
Patrycja																																																																																																																																																																																																																																																																											
Dominik R																																																																																																																																																																																																																																																																											
Sarna																																																																																																																																																																																																																																																																											
Aleksandra O																																																																																																																																																																																																																																																																											
Przemysław																																																																																																																																																																																																																																																																											
Wiktoria R																																																																																																																																																																																																																																																																											
Dominik G																																																																																																																																																																																																																																																																											
Małgorzata																																																																																																																																																																																																																																																																											
Angelika																																																																																																																																																																																																																																																																											
Marcin P																																																																																																																																																																																																																																																																											
Piotr N																																																																																																																																																																																																																																																																											
Eliasz																																																																																																																																																																																																																																																																											
Ronaldo																																																																																																																																																																																																																																																																											
Iryna																																																																																																																																																																																																																																																																											
Diana																																																																																																																																																																																																																																																																											
Grzesiek																																																																																																																																																																																																																																																																											
Olaf																																																																																																																																																																																																																																																																											
Magda P																																																																																																																																																																																																																																																																											
Julita																																																																																																																																																																																																																																																																											
Łukasz																																																																																																																																																																																																																																																																											
Adam																																																																																																																																																																																																																																																																											
Michał S																																																																																																																																																																																																																																																																											

=== Notes ===
Key: = Cast member is featured in this episode.
Key: = Cast member arrives in the house.
Key: = Cast member voluntarily leaves the house.
Key: = Cast member leaves and returns to the house in the same episode.
Key: = Cast member joins the series, but leaves the same episode.
Key: = Cast member returns to the house.
Key: = Cast member features in this episode, but outside of the house.
Key: = Cast member does not feature in this episode.
Key: = Cast member leaves the series.
Key: = Cast member returns to the series.
Key: = Cast member is removed from the series.
Key: = Cast member features in this episode despite not being an official cast member at the time.
Key: = Cast member returns to the series, but leaves same episode.

=== Other appearances ===
As well as appearing in Warsaw Shore, some of the cast members have appeared on other reality-shows:

- Hell's Kitchen
  - Mariusz "Ryjek" Adam – Series 2 (2014) – Fifteenth
  - Anna "Mała" Aleksandrzak – Series 5 (2016) – Twelfth (withdrew)
- Ex on the Beach Poland
  - Wojciech Gola – Series 1 (2016)
  - Jola Mróz – Series 1 (2016), Series 2 (2017)
  - Filip Ćwiek – Series 2 (2017)
  - Damian Graf – Series 2 (2017)
  - Piotr Polak – Series 2 (2017)
  - Magda Pyznar – Series 2 (2017)
  - Alan Kwieciński – Series 3 (2017)
  - Damian Zduńczyk – Series 3 (2017)
  - Anna Ryśnik – Series 4 (2018)
  - Bartek Barański – Series 4 (2018)
  - Anastasiya Yandaltsava – Series 4 (2018)
  - Ewa Piekut – Series 4 (2018)
  - Kasjusz "Don Kasjo" Życiński – Series 4 (2018)
- Top Model
  - Aleksandr "Sasha" Muzheiko – Series 6 (2016) – Twelfth
  - Kasjusz "Don Kasjo" Życiński – Series 6 (2016) – Bootcamp
- I'm a Celebrity...Get Me Out of Here! Hungary.
  - Gábor Szabó – Series 5 (2017) – Third
- Dom-2
  - Anastasiya Yandaltsava
- Love Island. Wyspa miłości^{(pl)}
  - Angelika Kramer– Series 4 (2021) – Sixth OUT
  - Aleksandr Muzheiko – Series 6 (2022) – Winner
  - Kamil Jagielski – Series 7 (2023) – Runner-Up
- The Challenge

Cast Member	The Challenges	Challenges Won	Total Money Earned
Gábor Szabó	Spies, Lies and Allies	None	$0

== Cast changes ==
The official cast members were revealed on 4 October 2013. They are Mariusz Śmietanowski, Anna Ryśnik, Wojciech Gola, Anna "Mała" Aleksandrzak, Paweł "Trybson" Trybała, Ewelina Kubiak, Paweł Cattaneo and Eliza Wesołowska.

On 12 March 2014, MTV announced that Mariusz Śmietanowski had left Warsaw Shore and would not be returning for the second series. Jakub Henke had joined the cast for Series 2. On 20 March 2014, it was confirmed that Eliza Wesołowska and Paweł Trybała would have no further participation in Warsaw Shore. The reason for the participants decision to leave the show is that Eliza is pregnant and she and Trybson are expecting their first child together. They were replaced by Alicja Herodzińska and Alan Kwieciński. In May 2014, it was confirmed that new cast member Malwina Pycka had joined the cast in the middle of the Series 2 and has replaced Alicja. Alicja Herodzińska would have no further participation in Warsaw Shore after five episodes.

In February 2015, it was confirmed that Jakub Henke and Malwina Pycka would not be returning for the third series. They were replaced by Damian "Stifler" Zduńczyk and Magda Pyznar. On 9 June 2015, it was confirmed that former cast members Eliza Wesołowska and Paweł Trybała, who performed from series 1 and one episode of series 2, will be returning for this series. On 14 July 2015, it was confirmed that Paweł Cattaneo had been axed from the show. In addition it was announced that Ewelina Kubiak leaves the show because of Paweł and will not appear in the next series. On 6 September 2015, it was confirmed that new cast member Klaudia Stec had joined the cast in episode 14 of series 3. In October 2015, it was confirmed that Jakub Henke returned to series 4 Warsaw Shore: Summer Camp as a main cast member. On 13 November 2015, it was confirmed that Alan Kwieciński left the show after the fourth series Warsaw Shore: Summer Camp. He was replaced by twin brothers – Pauly and Pietro Kluk. It was also confirmed that Ewelina Kubiak returned to the show as a main cast member.

On 18 April 2016, Anna Ryśnik announced that she had quit Warsaw Shore and series 5 would be her last series. In July 2016 it was announced that Ewelina Kubiak and twins Pauly and Pietro Kluk also left the show and would not appear in the sixth series. On 12 August 2016 it was confirmed that new cast members Aleksandra Smoleń and Piotr Polak joined the cast for the sixth series. On 20 October 2016 it was announced that Klaudia Stec had quit the show mid-series and would be replaced by new cast member Ewelina "Młoda" Bańkowska.

On 14 February 2017, three former cast members Alan Kwieciński, Ewelina Kubiak, and Klaudia Stec made a comeback since Winter Camp. Aleksandra Smoleń did not return after series six. After the seventh series it was announced that Jakub Henke, Alan Kwieciński, Magda Pyznar, Klaudia Stec, and Ewelina "Młoda" Bańkowska would be leaving Warsaw Shore. Anna "Mała" Aleksandrzak had quit the show during episode 10.

On 24 August 2017, it was revealed that the eighth series would feature nine potential new cast members. They were Jola Mróz, who had previously appeared on the first series of Ex on the Beach Poland as a main cast member and second series as an ex-girlfriend of current cast member Piotr, Anna "Andzia" Papierz, Bartek Barański, Ilona Borowska, Jacek Bystry, Kamila Widz, Marcin "Brzydal" Maruszak, Mariusz "Ryjek" Adam and Wiktoria Sypucińska. It was later confirmed that Anna "Mała" Aleksandrzak, who left during the previous series, returned for the eighth series. Jola Mróz, Jacek Bystry, Marcin "Brzydal" Maruszak, and Wiktoria Sypucińska were selected to become permanent. Bartek Barański quit the show and did not return in the ninth series.

Series nine was the final series to include original cast member Wojtek Gola following his decision to quit, as well as Jacek Bystry and Jola Mróz after they were both axed from the show. Wiktoria Sypucińska also left the show. The tenth series included new cast members Filip Ćwiek, who had previously appeared on the second series of Ex on the Beach Poland, Julia Kruzer, and Patryk Spiker. Former cast member Klaudia Stec returned to the show. Paweł "Trybson" Trybała also returned to the show as the boss. It featured numerous returns as it was the show's first anniversary season. Julia Kruzer left in episode ten and was replaced by Klaudia "Czaja" Czajkowska. On 13 January 2019 it was announced that Marcin "Brzydal" Maruszak had quit the show and this is his last season. Filip Ćwiek did not appear in the next series.

Series eleven introduced four new cast members: Anastasiya Yandaltsava, Ewa Piekut, Damian "Dzik" Graf, and Kasjusz "Don Kasjo" Życiński. Damian previously appeared on the second series of Ex on the Beach Poland as a main cast member. Anastasiya, Ewa, and Don Kasjo previously appeared on the fourth series of the show as main cast members. After series 11 Klaudia Stec and Klaudia "Czaja" Czajkowska quit the show. Hungarian celebrity Gábor "Gabo" Szabó joined the team in series 12. There were also brief visits from potential new members: Joanna Bałdys, Paweł Hałabuda, Anna Tokarska, Radosław "Diva" Majchrowski, and Aleksandr "Sasha" Muzheiko. Joanna Bałdys and Radosław "Diva" Majchrowski were selected to become permanent. This was the final series to include cast member Damian "Stifler" Zduńczyk following his decision to quit. It was also later announced that this would be Anna "Mała" Aleksandrzak's last series. Damian "Dzik" Graf also left in episode 11.

Series thirteen introduced new cast members Milena Łaszek and Marceli Szklanny. Damian "Dzik" Graf returned to the show after his exit the previous season. Anastasiya Yandaltsava, Gábor "Gabo" Szabó, and Marceli Szklanny left the show after series thirteen. Series fourteen introduced new cast members Kinga Gondorowicz, Maciek Szczukiewicz, Daniel "Arnold" Jabłoński, Michał Eliszer, and Paulina Karbowiak. Jakub "Ptyś" Henke returned to the show as the boss. Long time cast member Piotr "Pedro" Polak left the series in episode 5 of season 14. Ewelina Kubiak, Joanna Bałdys, Daniel "Arnold" Jabłoński, Paulina Karbowiak and Michał Eliszer also left after series 14. Series 15 introduced six new cast members: Oliwia Dziatkiewicz, Jeremiasz "Jez" Szmigiel, Lena Majewska, Dominik Raczkowski, Patrycja Morkowska and Kamil Jagielski. Damian "Dzik" Graf left the show while Dominik Raczkowski was removed, both in episode 8 of season 15. Additionally, Piotr Polak, Alan Kwieciński and Michał Eliszer made brief returns. Ewa Piekut, Kinga Gondorowicz and Maciek Szczukiewicz quit after series 15, while Ewelina Kubiak and Daniel "Arnold" Jabłoński returned in series 16. New cast member Michał "Sarna" Sarnowski joined in this series. Piotr Polak, Damian "Dzik" Graf, and Damian "Stifler" Zduńczyk also made a brief return. Kasjusz "Don Kasjo" Życiński quit the show during this series.

For the seventeenth season, Daniel "Arnold" Jabłoński, Patrycja Morkowska, Radosław "Diva" Majchrowski, and original member Ewelina Kubiak did not return after the previous season. It also includes five new cast members, Aleksandra Okrzesik, Przemysław "Sequento" Skulski oraz Wiktoria "Jaszczur" Robert, and the Dominik Gul and Małgorzata "Gosia" Jeziorowska, who were eliminated at the beginning of the series. Radosław "Diva" Majchrowski was with the cast at the beginning of the season despite not being part of the official cast. Jeremiasz "Jez" Szmigiel and Kamil Jagielski did not return for the eighteenth series. The eighteenth season includes Angelika Kramer, Eliasz Zdzitowiecki, Marcin "Mały" Pastuszka and Piotr "Pioterk" Nowakowski for the first time. Alan Kwieciński, Damian "Dzik" Graf and Kasjusz "Don Kasjo" Życiński made a brief return. Wiktoria "Jaszczur" Robert and Oliwia Dziatkiewicz left voluntarily mid-season. This is also the only series to feature Piotr Nowakowski and Eliasz Zdzitowiecki after not returning for another season.

The nineteenth season included Iryna "Renatka" Maltseva and Ronaldo "Czarny Polak" Miranda. This is the last series to feature Milena Łaszek, Michał Sarnowski and Przemysław "Sequento" Skulski as main members. The twentieth season saw the return of Jeremiasz "Jez" Szmigiel, as well as the entry of Diana Mościcka, Grzesiek Tomaszewski, Magda Pawińska and Olaf Majewski. It featured numerous returns as it was the show's second anniversary season. Geordie Shore's star Nathan Henry made a guest appearance for the second time, following the thirteenth series. Lena Majewska left the show mid-season. It was the last season in which Jakub "Ptyś" Henke was the boss and also the only one in which Magda and Olaf appeared.

The twenty-first season introduced original cast member Ewelina Kubiak as the new head of the team. It included the return of Oliwia Dziatkiewicz and saw the first appearances of Adam Mikołajczyk, Julita Izdebska, Łukasz Budyń and Michał Sewera. Germany Shore stars Fabio Pasquale and Bellydah Victoria joined the cast for several episodes, becoming the first guest stars to have a longer tenure with the team. Julia Kruzer from season ten made a brief appearance, while Patryk Spiker announced his retirement from the show.

A twenty-second season was filmed but never aired. Adam Mikołajczyk, Grzesiek Tomaszewski, and Michał Sewera did not participate in this season and were replaced by three new cast members. It also marked the return of Milena Łaszek after a two-season absence. Additionally, Francesco Russo and Swamy Prinno, stars of Italia Shore, stayed in Warsaw with the cast as guests.
