= Maureen Sullivan =

Maureen Sullivan may refer to:

- Maureen Sullivan (librarian), American librarian
- Maureen Sullivan (The Sullivans)

== See also ==
- Maureen O'Sullivan (disambiguation)
