= Maureen O'Sullivan (disambiguation) =

Maureen O'Sullivan was an Irish actress.

Maureen O'Sullivan may also refer to:

- Maureen O'Sullivan (politician) (born 1951), Irish independent politician
- Maureen O'Sullivan (spy) (1918–1994), member of the Special Operations Executive
- Maureen Donovan O'Sullivan (1886–1966), historian
- Maureen O'Sullivan (psychologist), see Wizards Project

== See also ==
- Maureen Sullivan (disambiguation)
