= Ex on the Beach Poland series 4 =

Ex on the Beach Poland
- Season 4
- No. of episodes: 8

Release
- Original network: MTV
- Original release: 17 September – 5 November 2018

Series chronology
- ← Previous; Series 3

The fourth series of Ex on the Beach Poland, a Polish television programme, began airing on 17 September 2018 on MTV. The show was announced in 21 August 2018. Cast member for this series include two Warsaw Shore stars Anna "Duża" Ryśnik and Bartek Barański. The series was filmed in Cyprus.

== Cast ==
The official list of cast members was released on 31 August and includes four single boys: Warsaw Shore cast member Bartek Barański, Bartek "Gimi" Gimiński, Kasjusz "Don Kasjo" Życiński and Maciej Rataj; as well as four single girls: Warsaw Shore cast member Anna "Duża" Ryśnik, Anastasiya Yandaltseva, Ewa Piekut and Ismena Stelmaszczyk. With the announcement of the line-up it was confirmed that Ex on the Beach Poland cast member and star of the first series, Dawid Ambro, would be making his return as an ex alongside star Ismena Stelmaszczyk.

- **Bold** indicates original cast member; all other cast were brought into the series as an ex.

Episodes	Name	Age (at start of series)	Hometown	Exes
8	**Anastasiya Yandaltseva**	24	Russia	—N/a
8	**Anna "Duża" Ryśnik**	26	Żmigród	—N/a
8	**Bartek Barański**	26	Kraków	Maja Kukiełka
8	**Bartek "Gimi" Gimiński**	21	Radzyń Chełmiński	Karolina Sagermann
8	**Ewa Piekut**			—N/a
8	**Ismena Stelmaszczyk**	21	Warsaw	Dawid Ambro
8	**Kasjusz "Don Kasjo" Życiński**	26	Gdańsk	Karina Pniewska
8	**Maciej Rataj**			—N/a
7	Maja Kukiełka		Kraków	Bartek Barański, Kamil
6	Karolina Sagermann	21	Sopot	Bartek "Gimi" Gimiński
5	Kamil	24		Maja Kukiełka
4	Dawid Ambro	28	Szczecin	Ismena Stelmaszczyk, Kornelia Dubrownik
3	Karina Pniewska			Kasjusz "Don Kasjo" Życiński
1	Kornelia Dubrownik			Dawid Ambro

=== Duration of cast ===
Cast members	Episodes							
Cast members	1	2	3	4	5	6	7	8
Anastasiya								
Anna								
Bartek B								
Bartek G								
Ewa								
Ismena								
Kasjusz								
Maciej								
Maja								
Karolina								
Kamil								
Dawid								
Karina								
Kornelia								

==== Notes ====
Key: = "Cast member" is featured in this episode.
Key: = "Cast member" arrives on the beach.
Key: = "Cast member" has an ex arrive on the beach.
Key: = "Cast member" does not feature in this episode.

== Episodes ==
No. overall	No. in season	Title	Duration	Polish viewers	Original release date
25	1	"Episode 1"	60 minutes	108 699	17 September 2018
26	2	"Episode 2"	60 minutes	54 646	24 September 2018
27	3	"Episode 3"	60 minutes	65 618	1 October 2018
28	4	"Episode 4"	60 minutes	44 922	8 October 2018
29	5	"Episode 5"	60 minutes	42 095	15 October 2018
30	6	"Episode 6"	60 minutes	55 298	22 October 2018
31	7	"Episode 7"	60 minutes	100 263	29 October 2018
32	8	"Episode 8"	60 minutes	47 331	5 November 2018
