= Ex on the Beach Poland series 3 =

Ex on the Beach Poland
- Season 3
- No. of episodes: 8

Release
- Original network: MTV
- Original release: 30 October – 18 December 2017

Series chronology
- ← Previous; Series 2 Next → Series 4

The third series of Ex on the Beach Poland, a Polish television programme, began airing on 30 October 2017 on MTV. The show was announced in 12 October 2017. Cast member for this series include Warsaw Shore star Alan Kwieciński and Marta Hrycyk. The series was filmed in Cyprus.

== Cast ==
The official list of cast members was released on 25 October 2017 and includes four single boys: Warsaw Shore cast member Alan Kwieciński, Denis Ilbeyli, Hubert Korczak and Norbert Hawryluk; as well as four single girls: Alicja Nikola "Nicki Queen" Kolasińska, Joanna Kasprzyk, Marta Hrycyk and Monika "Esmeralda" Godlewska. Ahead of the launch of the new series, it was confirmed that Series 2 cast member Hubert Korczak would be returning for the third series as main cast. Warsaw Shore cast member Damian Zduńczyk was also confirmed to be taking part in the series featuring as an ex.

- **Bold** indicates original cast member; all other cast were brought into the series as an ex.

Episodes	Name	Age (at start of series)	Hometown	Exes
8	**Alan Kwieciński**	25	Olsztyn	Magda "Loris" Serdyńska, Marika Wojtkowiak
8	**Alicja Nikola "Nicki Queen" Kolasińska**	23	Białystok	—N/a
8	**Denis Ilbeyli**	23		—N/a
6	**Hubert Korczak**	23	Warsaw	—N/a
8	**Joanna Kasprzyk**	26	Poznań	—N/a
8	**Marta Hrycyk**	20	Lębork	Damian "Stifler" Zduńczyk
5	**Monika "Esmeralda" Godlewska**	24	Warsaw	Tytus Maksymczak
8	**Norbert Hawryluk**	22	Szczecin	—N/a
7	Tytus Maksymczak	21	Torzym	Monika "Esmeralda" Godlewska, Natalia Jagiełło
6	Magda "Loris" Serdyńska		Katowice	Alan Kwieciński, Bartek "Ruby" Brzeziński
5	Bartek "Ruby" Brzeziński		Katowice	Magda "Loris" Serdyńska
4	Marika Wojtkowiak	24	Wałbrzych	Alan Kwieciński
2	Damian "Stifler" Zduńczyk	30	Police	Marta Hrycyk
2	Natalia Jagiełło	23	Łódź	Tytus Maksymczak

=== Duration of cast ===
Cast members	Episodes							
Cast members	1	2	3	4	5	6	7	8
Alan								
Alicja								
Denis								
Hubert								
Joanna								
Marta								
Monika								
Norbert								
Tytus								
Magda								
Bartek								
Marika								
Damian								
Natalia								

==== Notes ====
Key: = "Cast member" is featured in this episode.
Key: = "Cast member" arrives on the beach.
Key: = "Cast member" has an ex arrive on the beach.
Key: = "Cast member" leaves the beach.
Key: = "Cast member" does not feature in this episode.

== Episodes ==
No. overall	No. in season	Title	Duration	Polish viewers	Original release date
17	1	"Episode 1"	60 minutes	TBA	30 October 2017
18	2	"Episode 2"	60 minutes	TBA	6 November 2017
19	3	"Episode 3"	60 minutes	TBA	13 November 2017
20	4	"Episode 4"	60 minutes	TBA	20 November 2017
21	5	"Episode 5"	60 minutes	TBA	27 November 2017
22	6	"Episode 6"	60 minutes	TBA	4 December 2017
23	7	"Episode 7"	60 minutes	TBA	11 December 2017
24	8	"Episode 8"	60 minutes	TBA	18 December 2017
