= Ex on the Beach Poland series 2 =

Ex on the Beach Poland
- Season 2
- No. of episodes: 8

Release
- Original network: MTV
- Original release: 10 April – 5 June 2017

Series chronology
- ← Previous; Series 1 Next → Series 3

The second series of Ex on the Beach Poland, a Polish television programme, began airing on 10 April 2017 on MTV. The show was announced on 6 March 2017. Cast member for this series include Warsaw Shore star Piotr Polak. The series was filmed in Croatia.

== Cast ==
The official list of cast members was released on 27 March 2017 and includes four single boys: Damian Graf, Filip Ćwiek, Jacob Urbanowicz and Warsaw Shore cast member Piotr Polak; as well as four single girls; Kornelia Anna, Lena Bator, Martyna Chmielewska and Patrycja Dillinger. With the announcement of the line-up it was confirmed that Ex on the Beach Poland cast member and star of the first series, Jola Mróz, would be making her return as an ex alongside star Piotr Polak. Warsaw Shore cast member Magda Pyznar was also confirmed to be taking part in the series featuring as an ex.

- **Bold** indicates original cast member; all other cast were brought into the series as an ex.

Episodes	Name	Age (at start of series)	Hometown	Exes
8	**Damian Graf**	21	Leszno	Daria Jarzyna
8	**Filip Ćwiek**	20	Gdańsk	—N/a
8	**Jacob Urbanowicz**	23	Warsaw	Martyna "Mała" Chmielewska
8	**Kornelia Anna**	23	Gdańsk	Piotr Polak
8	**Lena Bator**	25	Warsaw	—N/a
8	**Martyna "Mała" Chmielewska**	23	Poznań	Jacob Urbanowicz
6	**Patrycja Dillinger**		Wrocław	Michał Schneider
8	**Piotr Polak**		Kraków	Kinga Garnys, Kornelia Anna, Jola Mróz, Magda Pyznar
7	Kinga Garnys	24	Warsaw	Piotr Polak
6	Daria Jarzyna	21	Nowy Tomyśl	Damian Graf
5	Michał Schneider	29	Wrocław	Patrycja Dillinger
4	Jola Mróz		Rybnik	Piotr Polak
3	Hubert Korczak	22	Warsaw	—N/a
2	Magda Pyznar	25	Knurów	Piotr Polak

=== Duration of cast ===
Cast members	Episodes							
Cast members	1	2	3	4	5	6	7	8
Damian								
Filip								
Jacob								
Kornelia								
Lena								
Martyna								
Patrycja								
Piotr								
Kinga								
Daria								
Michał								
Jola								
Hubert								
Magda								

==== Notes ====
Key: = "Cast member" is featured in this episode.
Key: = "Cast member" arrives on the beach.
Key: = "Cast member" has an ex arrive on the beach.
Key: = "Cast member" leaves the beach.
Key: = "Cast member" does not feature in this episode.

== Episodes ==
No. overall	No. in season	Title	Duration	Polish viewers	Original release date
9	1	"Episode 1"	60 minutes	29 557	10 April 2017
10	2	"Episode 2"	60 minutes	56 142	17 April 2017
11	3	"Episode 3"	60 minutes	25 319	24 April 2017
12	4	"Episode 4"	60 minutes	54 879	8 May 2017
13	5	"Episode 5"	60 minutes	39 834	15 May 2017
14	6	"Episode 6"	60 minutes	98 937	22 May 2017
15	7	"Episode 7"	60 minutes	89 726	29 May 2017
16	8	"Episode 8"	60 minutes	75 564	5 June 2017
