= Ex on the Beach Poland =

Polish reality television series

- Genre: Reality
- Created by: MTV Poland
- Country of origin: Poland
- Original language: Polish
- No. of series: 4
- No. of episodes: 32

Production
- Running time: 42 minutes (excluding adverts)
- Production company: Dragon Head

Original release
- Network: MTV
- Release: 7 November 2016 – 5 November 2018

Related
- Ex on the Beach; Warsaw Shore

Ex on the Beach Poland is a Polish reality television series that broadcast on MTV Poland. The series' premiere date was announced on 17 October 2016 and the show premiered on 7 November 2016. It features eight single men and women enjoying a summer holiday in paradise whilst looking for love. However, they were joined by their exes to shake things up. Each ex was there either for painful revenge or to rekindle their love. This is another Polish adaptation of a foreign series by MTV Poland after Warsaw Shore.

== Series ==
Year	Series	Predominant Location	Number of Episodes	Average MTV viewers
2016	Series 1	Hvar, Croatia	8	TBA
2017	Series 2	Hvar, Croatia	8	58 739
2017	Series 3	Ayia Napa, Cyprus	8	TBA
2018	Series 4	Ayia Napa, Cyprus	8	64 556

=== Series 1 (2016) ===
The first series of Ex on the Beach Poland was announced by MTV Poland on 17 October 2016. The show was confirmed to take place on the island of Hvar, Croatia. The first contestant whose identity was announced was Wojtek Gola, Warsaw Shore cast member. The official list of cast members was released on 24 October 2016 and includes four single boys: Wojtek Gola, Adam Zając, Michał Spała and Dawid Ambro; as well as four single girls: Jola Mróz, Marta Różańska, Sandra Sarapata and Joanna Kościak. The show premiered on 7 November 2016.

=== Series 2 (2017) ===
The second series of the show was announced on 6 March 2017. The series began airing on 10 April 2017. Ahead of the premiere it was confirmed that the series would be filmed on the island of Hvar, Croatia. The first contestant whose identity was announced was Warsaw Shore star Piotr Polak. The official list of cast members was released on 27 March 2017 and includes four single boys: Piotr Polak, Damian Graf, Jacob Urbanowicz and Filip Ćwiek; as well as four single girls: Lena Bator, Martyna "Mała" Chmielewska, Kornelia Anna and Patrycja Dillinger. With the announcement of the line-up it was confirmed that Ex on the Beach Poland cast member and star of the first series, Jola Mróz, would be making her return as an ex alongside star Piotr Polak. Warsaw Shore cast member Magda Pyznar was also confirmed to be taking part in the series featuring as an ex.

=== Series 3 (2017) ===
The third series of the show was announced on 12 October 2017. The series began airing on 30 October 2017. Ahead of the premiere it was confirmed that the series would be filmed on Cyprus. The first contestant whose identity was announced was Warsaw Shore star Alan Kwieciński and Marta Hrycyk, who appeared on the fourth series of Warsaw Shore: Summer Camp as a guest and close friend of Warsaw Shore cast member Damian Zduńczyk. The official list of cast members was released on 25 October 2017 and includes four single boys: Alan Kwieciński, Denis Ilbeyli, Hubert Korczak and Norbert Hawryluk; as well as four single girls: Alicja Nikola "Nicki Queen" Kolasińska, Joanna Kasprzyk, Marta Hrycyk and Monika "Esmeralda" Godlewska. Ahead of the launch of the new series, it was confirmed that Series 2 cast member Hubert Korczak would be returning for the third series as main cast. Warsaw Shore cast member Damian Zduńczyk was also confirmed to be taking part in the series featuring as an ex.

=== Series 4 (2018) ===
The fourth series of the show was announced on 21 August 2018. The series began airing 17 September 2018. Ahead of the premiere it was confirmed that the series would be filmed once again on Cyprus. The first contestant whose identity was announced was two Warsaw Shore stars Anna "Duża" Ryśnik and Bartek Barański. The official list of cast members was released on 31 August 2018 and includes four boys: Bartek Barański, Bartek "Gimi" Gimiński, Kasjusz "Don Kasjo" Życiński and Maciej Rataj; as well as four girls: Anastasiya Yandaltseva, Anna "Duża" Ryśnik, Ewa Piekut and Ismena Stelmaszczyk. With the announcement of the line-up it was confirmed that Ex on the Beach Poland cast member and star of the first series, Dawid Ambro, would be making his return as an ex alongside star Ismena Stelmaszczyk.
