= List of Tinker Bell cast members =

The following is the list of Tinker Bell cast members. It features various actors who voice characters that have appeared in the Tinker Bell film series.

== Cast ==
Character	Feature films						Television special	Short film
Character	Tinker Bell	Tinker Bell and the Lost Treasure	Tinker Bell and the Great Fairy Rescue	Secret of the Wings	The Pirate Fairy	Tinker Bell and the Legend of the NeverBeast	Pixie Hollow Games	Pixie Hollow Bake Off
Character	2008	2009	2010	2012	2014	2015	2011	2013
=== Main characters ===
Tinker Bell	Mae Whitman	Mae Whitman	Mae Whitman	Mae Whitman	Mae Whitman	Mae Whitman	Mae Whitman	Mae Whitman
Silvermist	Lucy Liu	Lucy Liu	Lucy Liu	Lucy Liu	Lucy Liu	Lucy Liu	Lucy Liu	Lucy Liu
Iridessa	Raven-Symoné	Raven-Symoné	Raven-Symoné	Raven-Symoné	Raven-Symoné	Raven-Symoné	Raven-Symoné	Raven-Symoné
Rosetta	Kristin Chenoweth	Kristin Chenoweth	Kristin Chenoweth	Megan Hilty	Megan Hilty	Megan Hilty	Megan Hilty	Megan Hilty
Fawn	America Ferrera	Angela Bartys	Angela Bartys	Angela Bartys	Angela Bartys	Ginnifer Goodwin	Angela Bartys	Angela Bartys
Vidia	Pamela Adlon	Silent cameo	Pamela Adlon	Pamela Adlon	Pamela Adlon	Pamela Adlon	Pamela Adlon	Pamela Adlon
Bobble	Rob Paulsen	Rob Paulsen	Rob Paulsen	Rob Paulsen	Rob Paulsen		Rob Paulsen	Rob Paulsen
Clank	Jeff Bennett	Jeff Bennett	Jeff Bennett	Jeff Bennett	Jeff Bennett		Jeff Bennett	Jeff Bennett
Terence	Jesse McCartney	Jesse McCartney	Jesse McCartney	Jesse McCartney	Jesse McCartney		Jesse McCartney	
Elizabeth “Lizzy” Griffiths			Lauren Mote					
Periwinkle				Lucy Hale	Silent cameo			
Zarina					Christina Hendricks			
Nyx						Rosario Dawson		
=== Fairy Royalty and Nobility ===
Queen Clarion	Anjelica Huston	Anjelica Huston		Anjelica Huston	Anjelica Huston	Anjelica Huston	Anjelica Huston	Anjelica Huston
Lord Milori				Timothy Dalton	Silent cameo			
Minister of Spring (Hyacinth)	Steve Valentine			Steve Valentine	Silent cameo			
Minister of Summer (Sunflower)	Kathy Najimy			Kathy Najimy	Silent cameo			
Minister of Autumn (Redleaf)	Richard Portnow	John DiMaggio		John DiMaggio	Silent cameo			
Minister of Winter (Snowflake)	Gail Borges							
=== Tinker Fairies ===
Fairy Mary	Jane Horrocks	Jane Horrocks		Jane Horrocks	Jane Horrocks		Jane Horrocks	Jane Horrocks
=== Garden Fairies ===
Chloe							Brenda Song	
Fern					Silent cameo	—N/a	Zendaya	
Ivy		Silent cameo	Silent cameo		Silent cameo	Melissa Goodwin Shepherd	Kari Wahlgren	
Lilac					Silent cameo	Silent cameo	Jessica DiCicco	
Sweetpea					Kari Wahlgren	Silent cameo		Silent cameo
=== Animal Fairies ===
Buck					Silent cameo	Jeff Corwin	Rob Paulsen	Silent cameo
Morgan						Olivia Holt		
Robin						Kari Wahlgren		
=== Dustkeeper Fairies ===
Bolt		Roger Craig Smith			Silent cameo			
Stone		Roger Craig Smith			Silent cameo			
Flint		Thom Adcox-Hernandez	Silent cameo		Silent cameo			Silent cameo
Sydney					Kari Wahlgren			Silent cameo
Fairy Gary		Jeff Bennett			Jeff Bennett		Jeff Bennett	Jeff Bennett
=== Fast-Flying Fairies ===
Zephyr					Silent cameo	Silent cameo	Alicyn Packard	
=== Winter Fairies ===
Dewey				Jeff Bennett	Silent cameo			
Sled				Matt Lanter	Silent cameo			
Spike				Debby Ryan	Silent cameo			
Gliss				Grey DeLisle	Grey DeLisle			
Slush				Ben Diskin				
=== Scout Fairies ===
Fury						Danai Gurira		
Chase						Chloe Bennet		
=== Storm Fairies ===
Rumble							Jason Dolley	
Glimmer					Silent cameo		Tiffany Thornton	
=== Other Fairies ===
Viola		Grey DeLisle						
Lyria		Grey DeLisle			Silent cameo		Silent cameo	Silent cameo
Scribble				Thomas Lennon		Thomas Lennon		Silent cameo
Lumina					Silent cameo	Silent cameo	Jessica DiCicco	Silent cameo
Gelata								Giada De Laurentiis
Healing Fairy				Jodi Benson		—N/a		
Receptionist				Kari Wahlgren				Silent cameo
=== Animals ===
Blaze		Eliza Pollack Zebert	Bob Bergen					
Cheese	Bob Bergen	Bob Bergen	Bob Bergen	Dee Bradley Baker			Bob Bergen	
Fiona				Dee Bradley Baker				
Mr. Owl		Rob Paulsen						
Mr. Twitches			Bob Bergen					
Tick-Tock the Crocodile					Dee Bradley Baker			
=== Humans ===
Wendy Darling	America Young							
Mrs. Darling	Kathryn Cressida							
Dr. Griffiths			Michael Sheen					
Mrs. Perkins			Faith Prince					
James					Tom Hiddleston			
Oppenheimer					Jim Cummings			
Port					Jim Cummings			
Bonito					Carlos Ponce			
Starboard					Mick Wingert			
Yang					Kevin Michael Richardson			
Smee					Jeff Bennett			
=== Trolls ===
Grimsley		Rob Paulsen						
Leech		Jeff Bennett						

Note: A gray cell indicates character did not appear in that medium.
