= List of Marido en alquiler cast members =

It is a list of actors who have participated in the telenovela Marido en alquiler.

== Cast ==
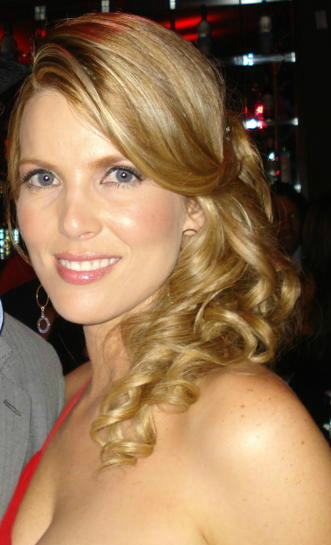
Maritza Rodríguez plays Teresa Cristina Palmer

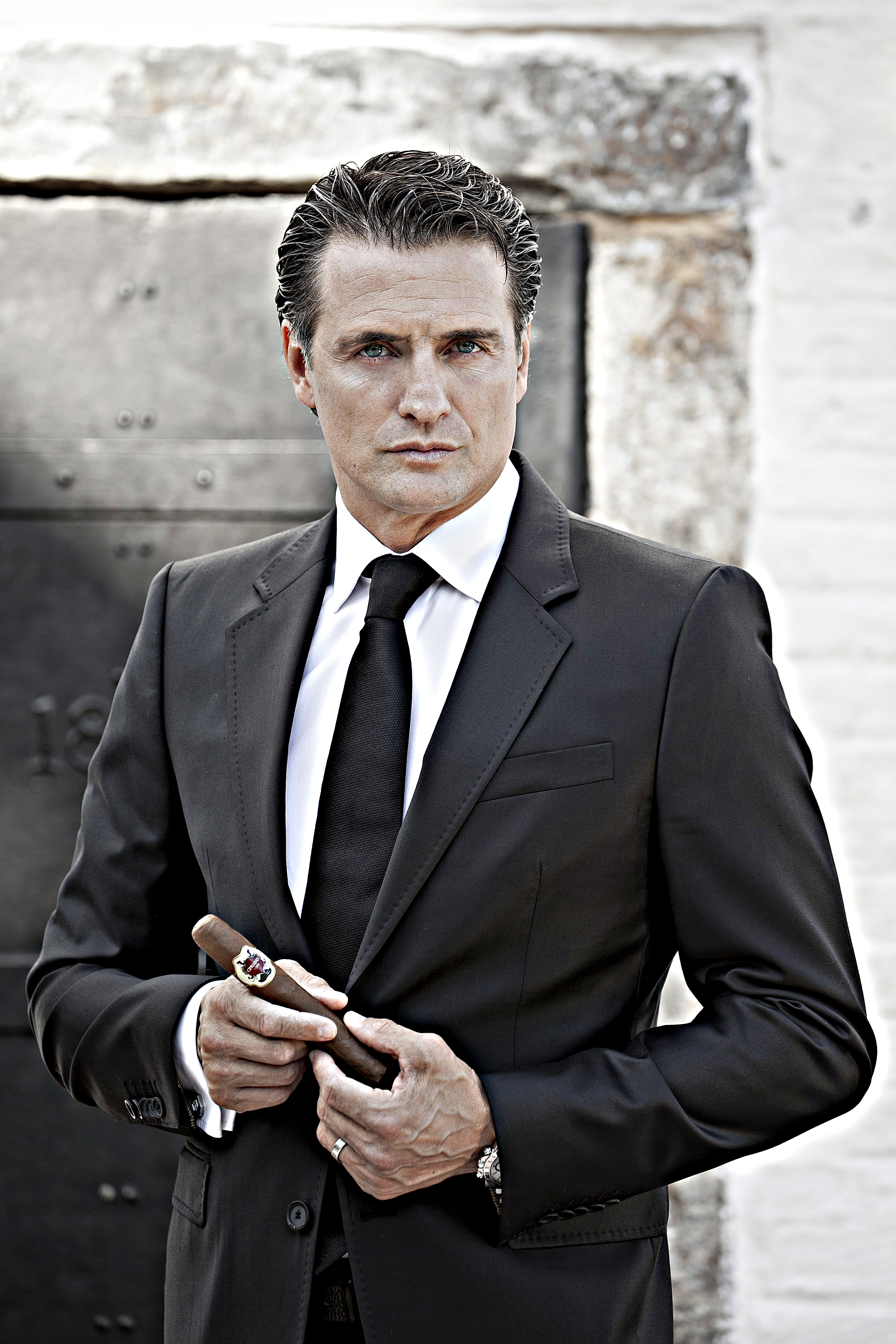
Juan Soler plays Reinaldo Ibarra

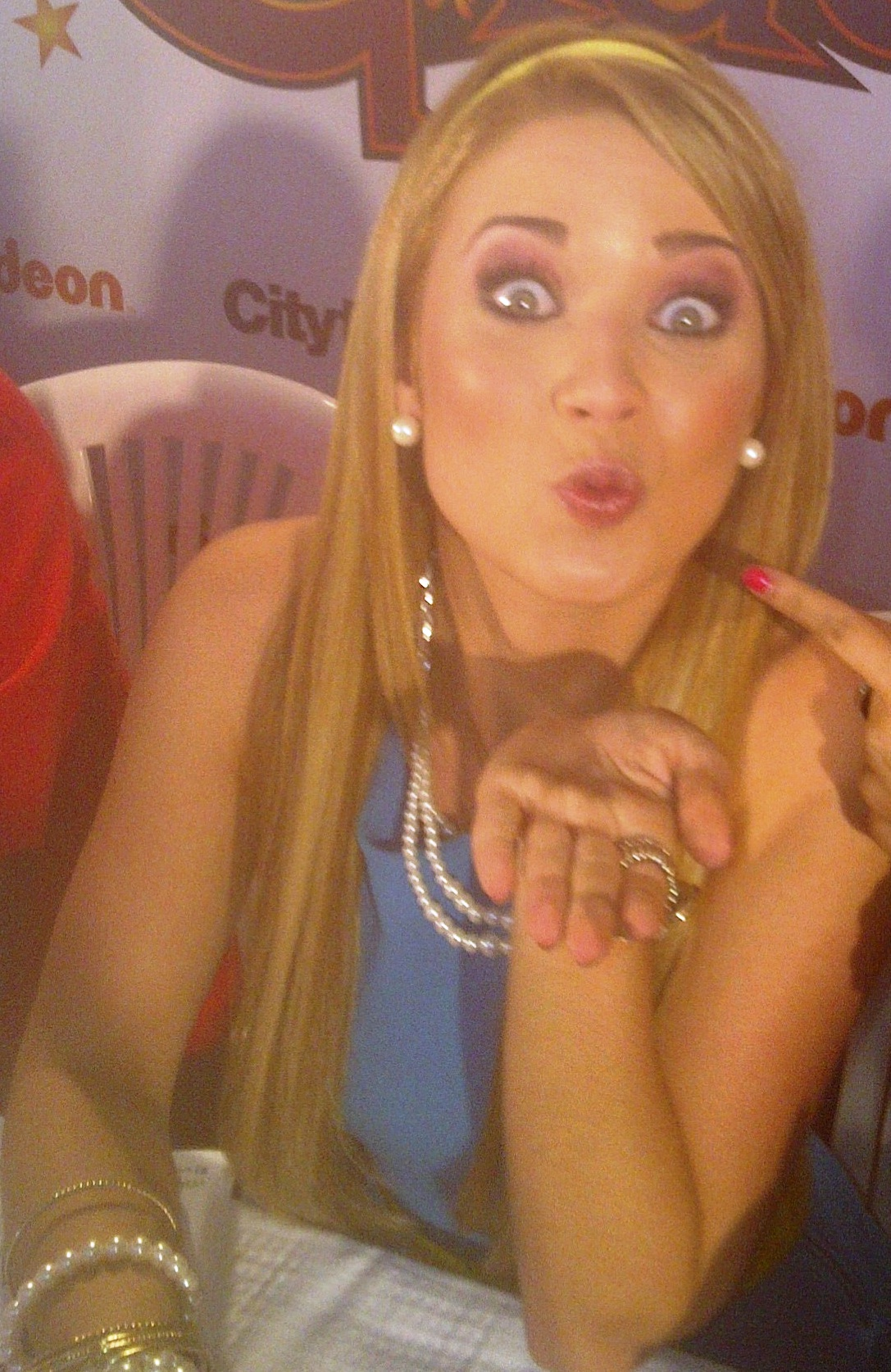
Kimberly Dos Ramos plays Patricia Ibarra Palmer

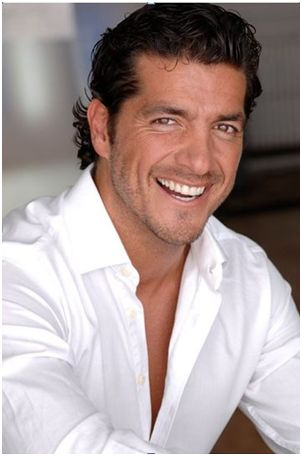
Paulo Quevedo plays Juan Pablo Palmer

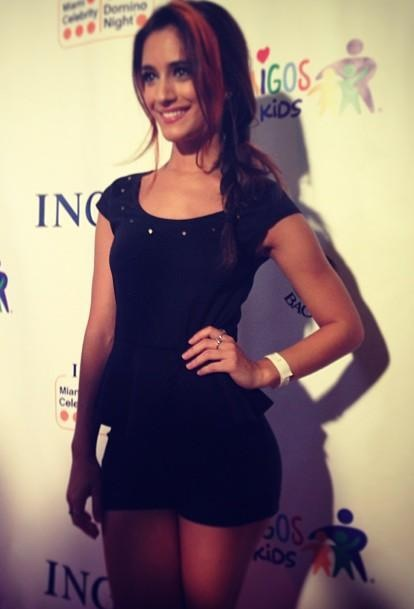
Sol Rodríguez plays Sol Porras

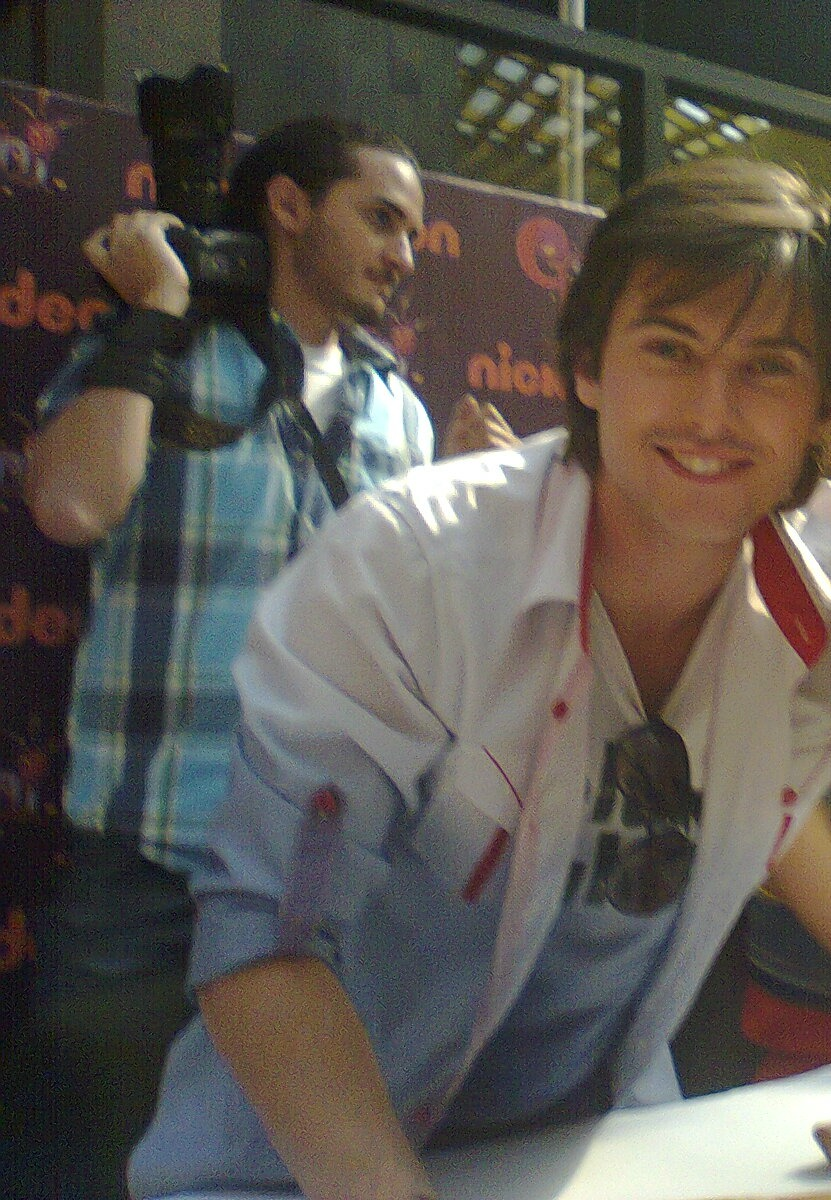
Lance Dos Ramos plays Víctor

=== Main ===
Actor(s)	Character	Based on
Sonya Smith	Griselda Carrasco / Marido en alquiler	Griselda da Silva Pereira ("Pereirão")
Maritza Rodríguez	Teresa Cristina Palmer	Tereza Cristina Buarque Siqueira de Velmont
Juan Soler	Reinaldo Ibarra	Renê Velmont
Miguel Varoni	José Salinas	José Pereira
Roberto Manrique	José Enrique "Kike" Salinas Carrasco	Joaquim José da Silva Pereira
Gabriel Coronel	José Antonio Salinas Carrasco	José Antenor da Silva Pereira
Kimberly Dos Ramos	Patricia Ibarra Palmer	Patrícia Siqueira de Velmont
Ricardo Chávez	Gabriel Rodríguez	Guaracy Martins

=== Supporting cast ===
Actor(s)	Character	Based on
Ana Carolina Grajales	María Amalia Salinas Carrasco	Maria Amália da Silva Pereira
Pablo Azar	Rafael Álamo	Rafael Fernandes
Paulo Quevedo	Juan Pablo Palmer	Paulo Buarque Siqueira
Sandra Destenave	Esther Salas	Esther Wolkoff Siqueira
Ariel Texido	Rosario "Ro" Valerio Flores	Crodoaldo "Crô" Valério Ribas
Daniela Navarro	Bárbara González de Salinas	Teodora Bastos Pereira
Alba Roversi	María Iris de Silva	Maria Íris de Siqueira Maciel
José Guillermo Cortines	Máximo Durán	Wallace Mu
Ismael La Rosa	Simón	Severino
Maite Embil	Celeste Porras	Celeste de Sousa Fonseca
Víctor Corona	Manuel Porras	Baltazar Fonseca
Dad Dáger	Paloma Ramos	Álvaro Siqueira
Adrián Carvajal	Daniel	Danielle Fraser
Gabriel Valenzuela	Fernando Sosa	Ferdinand
Lino Martone	Elio Salinas	Enzo Pereira
Jalymar Salomón	Clara Martínez	Dagmar dos Anjos
Adriana Lavat	Marcela Cortés	Marcela Coutinho
Anthony López	Iván Rouge	Juan Guilherme Passarelli
Sandra Eichler	Alba Perkins	Danielle Fraser
María del Pilar Pérez	Vanessa Flores	Vanessa Tavares Ribas
Sol Rodríguez	Sol Porras	Solange "Sol" de Sousa Fonseca
Ahrid Hannaley	Beatriz Lobo	Beatriz Lobo
Emmanuel Pérez	José Enrique "Kikito" Salinas González	Joaquim José Bastos Pereira Júnior (Quinzinho)

=== Minor role ===
Actor(s)	Character
Gustavo Pedraza	Mario López
Luis Álvarez Lozano	Leonardo Martínez
Nadia Escobar	Elsa
Carlos Arreaza	Honorio Freitas "El Gigante"
María Corina Ramírez	Penny
Natasha Domínguez	Diosa
Viviane Ligarde	Susana
Lance Dos Ramos	Víctor
Arancha Solís	Mónica Ramos
Iván Hernández	Richard Mendoza
Elluz Peraza	Mirna Bello / Giselle Salinas
Rodrigo Aragón	Fred
Cristian Adrian	Joe
William Amundaray	Cook Tomás
Hilary Benjumea	Trabajadora 'Maridas en alquiler'
Juan Cepero	Dr. Jack Silverstain
Frank Guzmán	Jorge Muralla
Martha Mijares	Doña Olga
Andres Mistage	Guillermo Perkins
Francisco Porras	Detective Francisco Vargas
Yamil Sesin	El Mafioso
Riczabeth Sobalvarro	Deborah
Arancha Solís	Licenciada Mónica Ramos
Mía Soler	Juliana
