= List of The Larry Sanders Show guest stars =

The Larry Sanders Show is an American sitcom set in the office and studio of a fictional late-night talk-show. The series was created by Garry Shandling and Dennis Klein and aired from August 1992 to May 1998 on the HBO cable television network. Throughout its run, numerous celebrities have made guest appearances, usually playing fictionalized versions of themselves.

== Season 1 ==
- Episode 1: "The Garden Weasel"
  - Robert Hays as himself
  - James Karen as Sheldon Davidoff
  - Deborah May as Melanie Parrish
  - Kathy Kinney as dog trainer
- Episode 2: "The Promise"
  - David Spade as himself
  - Dana Delany as herself
  - William Shatner as himself
  - Cindy Morgan as Karen Jackson
- Episode 3: "The Spider Episode"
  - Carol Burnett as herself
  - Jon Lovitz as himself
  - Steve Duchesne as himself
  - Steven R. Kutcher as himself
- Episode 4: "Guest Host"
  - Dana Carvey as himself
  - Anne-Marie Johnson as Barbara Kirsh
  - James Karen as Sheldon Davidoff
  - Hervé Villechaize as himself
- Episode 5: "The New Producer"
  - Robert Morton as himself
  - Jeff Cesario as himself
  - Ian Buchanan as Jonathan Litman
  - Evelina Fernandez as Nina
- Episode 6: "The Flirt Episode"
  - Mimi Rogers as herself
  - Michael Richards as himself
  - Carmen Filpi as Bert Crawley
  - Sam Whipple as Makeup artist
  - Mindy Sterling as Writer
- Episode 7: "Hank's Contract"
  - Robin Williams as himself
  - George Foreman as himself
  - James Karen as Sheldon Davidoff
- Episode 8: "Out of the Loop"
  - Peter Falk as himself
  - Kimberley Kates as Sally
  - Sam Whipple as Makeup artist
- Episode 9: "The Talk Show Episode"
  - Billy Crystal as himself
  - Catherine O'Hara as herself
- Episode 10: "Party"
  - Martin Mull as himself
- Episode 11: "The Warmth Episode"
  - Richard Simmons as himself
  - Mindy Sterling as Writer
  - John Riggi as Photographer
  - Sam Whipple as Makeup artist
- Episode 12: "A Brush With (the Elbow of) Greatness"
  - David Paymer as Norman Litkey
  - Tom Dahlgren as Ben Smalley
  - John Riggi as Reporter
  - Jeanne Basone as Cindy Remington
  - Bella Shaw as herself
- Episode 13: "The Hey Now Episode"
  - Bob Saget as himself
  - Earl Holliman as himself
  - T Bone Burnett as himself
  - Sam Whipple as Makeup artist
  - Ray Combs as himself
  - Mindy Sterling as Writer
  - Patrick Thomas O'Brien as Carl Henckel

== Season 2 ==
- Episode 1: "The Breakdown: Part 1""
  - Deborah May as Melanie Parrish
  - Kathy Ireland as herself
  - Los Lobos as themselves
  - Victor Raider-Wexler as Doctor
  - John Riggi as Steve
- Episode 2: The Breakdown: Part 2"
  - Dana Delany as herself
  - Helen Hunt as herself
  - Teri Garr as herself
  - Susan Anton as herself
  - John Riggi as Steve
  - Kristin Davis as Bri
- Episode 3: "The List"
  - Alec Baldwin as himself
  - Ed Begley Jr. as himself
  - Daniel Baldwin as himself
- Episode 4: "The Stalker"
  - Phil Hartman as himself
  - Corbin Bernsen as himself
  - Nelson Ascencio as Xavier The Burglar
- Episode 5: "Larry's Agent"
  - Barry Levinson as himself
  - Doc Severinsen as himself
  - Tommy Newsom as himself
  - John Pleshette as Leo
  - James Karen as Sheldon Davidoff
  - Bob Odenkirk as Stevie Grant
- Episode 7: "Life Behind Larry"
  - David Letterman as himself
  - Steven Wright as himself
  - Kevin Nealon as himself
  - Bobcat Goldthwait as himself
  - Tom Snyder as himself
  - Deborah May as Melanie Parrish
  - Richard Lewis as himself
- Episode 8: "Artie's Gone"
  - Bruno Kirby as himself
  - Porno for Pyros as themselves
  - Steven Wright as himself
  - Les Lannom as Tech Guy
- Episode 9: "Larry Loses Interest"
  - Suzanne Somers as herself
  - Joan Embery as herself
  - Anita Barone as Michelle
  - Richard Frank as Thomas
  - Les Lannom as Stagehand
- Episode 10: "Larry's Partner"
  - Eric Bogosian as Stan Paxton
- Episode 11: "Broadcast Nudes"
  - Hugh Hefner as himself
- Episode 12: Larry's Birthday"
  - Sugar Ray Leonard as himself
  - John Riggi as Mike Patterson
  - Miguel Perez as Camera #1
  - Julio Oscar Mechoso as Camera #2
- Episode 13: "Being There"
  - Gary Kemp as Jake Woodward
  - Talia Balsam as Dora
- Episode 14: "The Performance Artist"
  - Roseanne Barr as herself
  - Tom Arnold as himself
  - Jay Leno as himself
  - Tim Miller as himself
  - George Segal as himself
  - John Riggi as Mike Patterson
- Episode 15: "Hank's Wedding"
  - Ed McMahon as himself
  - Adam Sandler as himself
  - Alex Trebek as himself
  - Leah Lail as Margaret Dolan
- Episode 16: "Off Camera"
  - Elizabeth Ashley as herself
  - John Ritter as himself
  - Gene Siskel as himself
  - Warren Zevon as himself
  - Joshua Malina as Robert Brody
  - Peter Tolan as Adam Loderman
- Episode 17: "The Grand Opening"
  - Martin Mull as himself
  - Burt Reynolds as himself
  - Jerry Seinfeld as himself
  - John Riggi as Mike Patterson
- Episode 18: "New York or L.A."
  - Chris Farley as himself
  - Howard Stern as himself
  - Bob Odenkirk as Stevie Grant
  - David Warner as Richard Germain
  - Robin Quivers as herself

== Season 3 ==
- Episode 1: "Montana"
  - Bernadette Peters as herself
  - Robin Williams as himself
  - David Warner as Richard Germain
- Episode 2: "You're Having My Baby"
  - Mimi Rogers as herself
  - Ray Wise as Lloyd Simon
  - Tracey Ellis as Mary Beth Nagler
- Episode 3: "Would You Do Me a Favor?"
  - Jason Alexander as himself
  - Warren Frost as Jerry Sanders
  - French Stewart as Intern
- Episode 4: "The Gift Episode"
  - Danny DeVito as himself
  - Jimmie Walker as himself
  - Paul Willson as Bob Minkoff
- Episode 5: "People's Choice"
  - Elvis Costello as himself
  - Rita Moreno as herself
  - Bob Odenkirk as Stevie Grant
  - Deborah May as Melanie Parrish
- Episode 6: "Hank's Night in the Sun"
  - George Wendt as himself
  - Shadoe Stevens as himself
- Episode 7: "Office Romance"
  - Bob Saget as himself
- Episode 8: "The Mr. Sharon Stone Show"
  - Sharon Stone as herself
  - David Paymer as Norman Litkey
  - Julianne Phillips as herself
  - Lisa Edelstein as Diane French
- Episode 9: "Headwriter"
  - Dave Thomas as himself
  - John Riggi as Mike Patterson
  - Jim Turner as Greg
- Episode 10: "Like No Business I Know"
  - Bobcat Goldthwait as himself
  - Regis Philbin as himself
  - Phil Leeds as Sid Bessel
- Episode 11: "Larry Loses a Friend"
  - Jon Lovitz as himself
  - Mark Roberts as Leo Metcalf
  - Elsa Raven as Jarina Venvenich
- Episode 12: "Doubt of the Benefit"
  - Rob Reiner as himself
  - Richard Belzer as himself
  - Pauly Shore as himself
- Episode 13: "Hank's Divorce"
  - Leah Lail as Margaret Dolan
  - Wayne Rogers as himself
- Episode 14: "The Fourteenth Floor"
  - John Ritter as himself
  - Deborah May as Melanie Parrish
  - Matt Letscher as Daniel Pryor
  - Haley Joel Osment as Little Boy
- Episode 15: "Next Stop...Bottom"
  - Sarah Jessica Parker as herself
  - Mary Gross as herself
  - Wendy Liebman as herself
  - David Viscott as himself
  - Phil Leeds as Sid Bessel
  - Patrick Bristow as Raoul
  - Angelle Brooks as Felicia
  - Gloria LeRoy as Helen
- Episode 16: "Arthur's Crises"
  - Clint Black as himself
  - Kris Kristofferson as himself
- Episode 17: "End of the Season"
  - Roseanne Barr as herself
  - Pat Sajak as himself
  - Jeff Cesario as himself
  - Mark Sweet as himself
  - Michel Richard as himself
  - Bob Odenkirk as Stevie Grant

== Season 4 ==
- Episode 1: "Roseanne's Return"
  - Roseanne Barr as herself
  - Chevy Chase as himself
  - Charles Cioffi as Dr. Reisman
- Episode 2: "Hank's New Assistant"
  - Dana Carvey as himself
  - Peter Dante as Delivery Man
- Episode 3: "Arthur After Hours"
  - Ryan O'Neal as himself
  - Sandra Bernhard as herself
  - Elya Baskin as Nicolae
- Episode 4: "The Bump"
  - Jeff Cesario as himself
  - David Duchovny as himself
  - Rob Lowe as himself
  - Vendela Kirsebom as herself
  - Barry Nolan as Newscaster
- Episode 5: "Jeannie's Visit"
  - Tatjana Patitz as herself
- Episode 6: "The P.A."
  - Colin Quinn as Cully
  - Chris Isaak as himself
  - Larry King as himself
- Episode 7: "Hank's Sex Tape"
  - Henry Winkler as himself
  - Norm Macdonald as himself
  - Phil Leeds as Sid Bessel
  - Jennifer Rhodes as Irene Goodman
  - Athena Massey as Woman #1
  - Jon Favreau as Jon
- Episode 8: "Nothing Personal"
  - Jeff Goldblum as himself
  - Marg Helgenberger as Susan Elliott
- Episode 9: "Brother, Can You Spare 1.2 Million?"
  - Paul Willson as Frank
  - Molly Hagan as Ad Executive
- Episode 10: "Conflict of Interest"
  - Bob Odenkirk as Stevie Grant
  - Jennifer Aniston as herself
  - Beck as himself
  - Deborah May as Melanie Parrish
  - Andy Kindler as himself
- Episode 11: "I Was a Teenage Lesbian"
  - Brett Butler as herself
  - Susan Gibney as Kia
  - Michael Boatman as Greg
- Episode 12: "Larry's Sitcom"
  - Chris Elliott as himself
  - Jennie Garth as herself
  - Kevin Nealon as himself
  - Bob Odenkirk as Stevie Grant
  - Christine Healy as Kim
  - Peter Dante as Steve
  - Harvey Vernon as Harlan Wilcox
- Episode 13: "Larry's Big Idea"
  - Courteney Cox as herself
  - David Letterman as himself
- Episode 14: "Beverly and the Prop Job"
  - Paul Mooney as Clyde
  - Victoria Principal as herself
  - Dick Anthony Williams as Beverly's Father
- Episode 15: "0.409"
  - Shawn Colvin as herself
  - John Stamos as himself
  - Sam Rubin as himself
  - Gerrit Graham as Kevin
- Episode 16: "Eight"
  - Fred de Cordova as himself
  - Farrah Fawcett as herself
  - k.d. lang as herself
  - Mandy Patinkin as himself
  - Pat O'Brien as himself
  - Rosie O'Donnell as herself
  - Ryan O'Neal as himself
  - George Segal as himself
  - Noah Wyle as himself
- Episode 17: "Larry's on Vacation"
  - Sandra Bernhard as herself
  - Julianna Margulies as herself
  - Gloria Steinem as herself
  - Deborah May as Melanie Parrish
  - Lois Foraker as Ellen Boyd

== Season 5 ==
- Episode 1: "Everybody Loves Larry"
  - Jon Stewart as himself
  - David Duchovny as himself
  - Elvis Costello as himself
  - Charles Nelson Reilly as himself
  - Deborah May as Melanie Parrish
  - Laura Cayouette as Carol
  - Peter Dante as Steve
- Episode 2: "My Name is Asher Kingsley"
  - Amy Aquino as Rabbi Marcy Klein
  - Tom Poston as himself
  - They Might Be Giants as themselves
  - Deborah May as Melanie Parrish
  - Jon Korkes as Stu
  - Ned Bellamy as Carl
- Episode 3: "Where is the Love?"
  - Tom Shales as himself
  - Sally Field as herself
  - Sting as himself
  - Jake Johannsen as himself
  - John Robert Hoffman as David
- Episode 4: "Ellen, Or Isn't She?"
  - Ellen DeGeneres as herself
  - Bob Odenkirk as Stevie Grant
  - Scott Jaeck as Jake
- Episode 5: "The New Writer"
  - Kevin Nealon as himself
  - Sarah Silverman as Wendy Traston
  - Shawn Colvin as herself
  - Todd Barry as Keith
  - Bil Dwyer as Ed
- Episode 6: "Matchmaker"
  - Tim Conway as himself
  - Harvey Fierstein as himself
  - Nicollette Sheridan as herself
  - Tim DeKay as Gordon
  - Tim Maculan as Allen
- Episode 7: "Make a Wish"
  - Ben Stiller as himself
  - Jim Belushi as himself
  - David Paymer as Norman Litkey
  - Chauncey Leopardi as Charlie
  - Brooke Smith as Tonya Bailey
  - Robin Bain as Model
- Episode 8: "Artie, Angie, Hank and Hercules"
  - Angie Dickinson as herself
  - Don Rickles as himself
  - Laura Leighton as herself
  - Taylor Nichols as Robbie
- Episode 9: "The Prank"
  - Lori Loughlin as herself
  - John Stamos as himself
  - Cecil Hoffman as Michelle Hollaway
  - Butthole Surfers as themselves
  - Todd Barry as Keith
  - Robert Mailhouse as Gary Rindels
- Episode 10: "The Book"
  - Dana Delany as herself
  - Bruno Kirby as himself
  - Marlee Matlin as herself
  - Brooke Shields as herself
  - Joyce Brothers as herself
  - Bob Odenkirk as Stevie Grant
  - Joseph C. Phillips as James
- Episode 11: "Pain Equals Funny"
  - Kirk Baily as Ed
  - Suli McCullough as Jack
- Episode 12: "The Roast"
  - Kip Addotta as himself
  - Dana Carvey as himself
  - Norm Crosby as himself
  - Al Franken as himself
  - Bruno Kirby as himself
  - Bill Maher as himself
  - Carl Reiner as himself
  - Jon Stewart as himself
  - Carrot Top as himself
  - Bob Odenkirk as Stevie Grant
  - David Paymer as Norman Litkey
- Episode 13: "Larry's New Love"
  - Melinda McGraw as Alex
  - Bruce Greenwood as Roger Bingham
  - Jeff Foxworthy as himself
  - Daisy Fuentes as herself
  - Warren Littlefield as himself
  - Paul Westerberg as himself

== Season 6 ==
- Episode 1: "Another List"
  - Jon Stewart as himself
  - Winona Ryder as herself
  - Smash Mouth as themselves
  - Bruce Greenwood as Roger Bingham
  - Joshua Malina as Kenny Mitchell
  - George Wyner as Paul Fisher
- Episode 2: "The Beginning of the End"
  - Jon Stewart as himself
  - Colin Hay as himself
  - Bruce Greenwood as Roger Bingham
  - Joshua Malina as Kenny Mitchell
  - Bob Odenkirk as Stevie Grant
  - Charles Cioffi as Dr. Reisman
- Episode 3: "As My Career Lay Dying"
  - Lea Thompson as herself
  - Bob Costas as himself
  - Jim Gray as himself
  - Fred de Cordova as himself
  - Pat Sajak as himself
  - Andy Williams as himself
  - Donny Osmond as himself
  - Jeff Kahn as Jeff
  - Jim Brooks as Vern the Intern
- Episode 4: "Pilots and Pens Lost"
  - Dave Chappelle as himself
  - Bridget Fonda as herself
  - Jonathan Katz as himself
  - Carlos Jacott as Bill
  - Jenna Stern as Lisa
- Episode 5: "The Interview"
  - Jim Belushi as himself
  - Ben Folds Five as themselves
  - Maureen O'Boyle as herself
  - Vince Vaughn as himself
  - David Spade as himself
  - David Paymer as Norman Litkey
- Episode 6: "Adolf Hankler"
  - Jon Stewart as himself
  - Wayne Federman as Stan Sanders
  - Jason Alexander as himself
  - Kristen Johnston as herself
  - Wu-Tang Clan as themselves
  - Joshua Malina as Kenny Mitchell
  - Deborah May as Melanie Parrish
  - Richard Penn as Dr. Reisman
- Episode 7: "Beverly's Secret"
  - Michael Bolton as himself
  - Drew Carey as himself
  - Eriq La Salle as himself
  - Tom Amandes as Russ Schmitt
  - Ashley Gardner as Fran Schmitt
  - Wade Williams as Mike
  - Steven Wright as himself
- Episode 8: "I Buried Sid"
  - Laura Dern as herself
  - Jerry Stiller as himself
  - Larry Miller as himself
  - Paul Willson as Fred
  - Rosey Grier as himself
  - Char Margolis as herself
  - Heidi Klum as herself
- Episode 9: "Just the Perfect Blendship"
  - Gina Gershon as herself
  - Jeff Goldblum as himself
  - Illeana Douglas as herself
  - Terry Bradshaw as himself
  - Sarah Silverman as Wendy Traston
  - Polly Draper as Dr. Monica Gordon
- Episode 10: "Putting the "Gay" Back in Litigation"
  - Illeana Douglas as herself
  - Bruno Kirby as himself
  - Ed Begley Jr. as himself
  - Drew Barrymore as herself
  - Sarah Silverman as Wendy Traston
- Episode 11: "Flip"
  - Jim Carrey as himself
  - Jerry Seinfeld as himself
  - Tim Allen as himself
  - Ellen DeGeneres as herself
  - Carol Burnett as herself
  - Sean Penn as himself
  - Clint Black as himself
  - Warren Beatty as himself
  - David Duchovny as himself
  - Greg Kinnear as himself
  - Bruno Kirby as himself
  - Tom Petty as himself
  - Jon Stewart as himself
  - Marshall Bell as Sound Guy
  - David Bowe as Jimmy Franks
  - Bob Odenkirk as Stevie Grant
  - David Paymer as Norman Litkey
  - Paul Willson as Fred
