= List of The Sullivans cast members =

This is a list of actors who appeared in the Australian television program The Sullivans.

== A ==
- Peter Aanensen as Personnel Manager
- Christine Amor as Stella Burke
- Andy Anderson as Jim Sullivan
- Chris Anderson as Lone Digger
- Kerry Armstrong as Winni
- John Arnold as Ralph
- Richard Askew as Man in Pub
- Bruce Atkins

== B ==
- Vincent Ball as Admiral Spencer / Major Greenwell
- Arthur Barradell-Smith as Dean / Minister
- Tony Barry as Ginger
- Lorraine Bayly as Grace Sullivan
- Francis Bell as Billy Brinkley
- Jessica Bell as Roula
- Vanessa Belletty as Nurse
- Bill Bennett as Postman
- Dianne Berryman as Agency Girl
- Clive Birchnore as Recruiting Officer
- Steve Bisley as Richard Granger
- Jeffrey Booth as Mr Robinson
- Tom Booth as Karl / Yank Officer
- Ernie Bourne as University Lecturer
- Sally Bourne
- John Bowman as Constable Smith
- Ivor Bowyer as Recruiting Officer
- Dorothy Bradley as Mrs Kendall
- David Bradshaw as Man in Pub / Salvation Army Officer / Andrew Rankin / Jimmy
- Don Bridges as 'Nervous' Nev Hollyoak / Lucas
- Bobby Bright as Pete
- Alistair Browning as Ray Kirk
- Max Bruch as Italian Captain
- Robert Bruning
- Miles Buchanan as Samuel
- Dieter Buntrock as German Soldier
- Ray Burgess as Albert
- Marcella Burgoyne as Lotte Kaufmann
- Simon Burke as Peter Robinson
- Tom Burlinson as Otto Werner
- Annie Byron as Lou Sullivan

== C ==
- David Cameron as Russell Hardwick
- Michael Carman as Italian Prisoner / Mucj the Toff
- Albert Caton as The Mate / Dog
- Michael Caton as Harry Sullivan
- Anne Charleston
- Liddy Clark as Marge
- Andrew Clarke as Detective King
- Stephen Clark as Jacko / Charlie
- David Clencie as Steve Sullivan
- Geoffrey Clingin as Sergeant Talbot / Soldier
- Geoff Collins as Reporter
- Benita Collings as Lucette
- Chantal Contouri as Melina Baker
- Burt Cooper as Helmut Bruchner / Bill / German Officer
- Campbell Copelin as Mr Peterson
- Janine Campbell-Cowie as Airman's Gin real life friend
- Diane Craig as Pamela Somers
- Murray Crawford as Soldier
- Lisa Crittenden as Sally Meredith
- Paul Cronin as Dave Sullivan
- Marcel Cugola as Big Ali / Farmer
- Arron Wayne Cull
- Peter Cummins as ColoMel Walker
- Lloyd Cunnington as Detective / Policeman
- Peter Curtin as Detective

== D ==
- John Dale as Young Soldier
- Kerry Daniel as Receptionist
- Mercia Deane-Johns as Timna
- Myra De Groot as Laura Watkins
- Paula deBurgh as Amy / Matron
- Maggie Dence as Rose Sullivan
- Stefan Dennis as Soldier
- Rod Densley as Airman
- Sue Devine as Vonnie Collins
- Lisa Dewhurst as Gracie Sullivan
- John Dibbs as Milkman
- John Dommett
- Penny Downie as Patty Spencer Sullivan
- Barry Doyle as Taxi Driver
- Douglas Drury as Padre
- Michael Duffield as Arthur Johnson
- Gerry Duggan as Patrick Sullivan
- Dennis Dunnell as Soldier
- Joy Dunstan as Waitress
- Patrick Dylan as Man in Cinema
- Tommy Dysart as Fergus McCullough

== E ==
- Wallas Eaton as Arthur Pike
- Keith Eden as Dr Donovan / Grandpa Donovan
- Maureen Edwards as A.W.A.S. Captain
- John Egan as Lieutenant
- Cliff Ellen as Des Butler / Desk Sergeant / Joe / Pete / Simmo
- Brent Emery as John Albert
- Brian Evis as Lieutenant Joe Murphy
- Howard Eynon as Corporal Hall

== F ==
- Max Fairchild as Max
- Kaarin Fairfax as Mona
- Peter Felmingham as Sgt Major Harris
- Charlene Fenn
- Gary Files as Keith Bridges
- Lewis Fitz-Gerald as Burke
- Jill Forster as Isabelle
- Cenarth Fox as Syd
- Earl Francis as Instructor

== G ==
- Carrillo Gantner as Captain Fitzsimmons
- Nic Gazzana as Greek Train Driver
- Belinda Giblin as Sue Marriot
- Mel Gibson as Ray Henderson
- Vincent Gil as Peter
- Terry Gill as Ted
- Andrew Gilmour as Vicar
- Ian Gilmour as Young German
- Kevin Golby as Saxby Lauder
- Nanette Goode as Mrs Ryder
- Vic Gordon as Mr Brookman / Henry Dumpleton
- Jacqui Gordon as Margery Fulton
- John Gould as Mr Mac
- Reg Gorman as Jack Fletcher
- Robert Graham as Ned
- Brian Granrott as Wilson
- Chris Gray as Rob / Student
- Ernie Gray as Private Owen
- Vivean Gray as Ida Jessup
- Dennis Grosvenor as The Major
- Chris Groutas as Poppo
- Ralph Guthrie as Postman
- Chris Guyler as Officer
- Kym Gyngell as Reporter

== H ==
- Penne Hackforth-Jones
- Vicki Hammond as Maggie Baker / Maggie Hayward
- Olivia Hamnett as Meg Fulton
- Norman Hancock as Tom Edmunds
- Susan Hannaford as Kitty Sullivan
- Alan Hardy as Journalist / Andy
- Jonathan Hardy as Captain
- Isobel Harley as Mrs Jones
- Brian Harrison as Dr Harris
- Graham Harvey as Robbie McDuggan
- Peter Harvey-Wright as Ernest 'Urger' O'Keefe
- Brian Hatfield as Chops
- Anthony Hawkins as Sergeant
- Leila Hayes as Anne Watson
- Nancye Hayes
- Noni Hazlehurst as Lil Duggan
- Clive Hearne as Captain Dyer / Inspectir / Sergeant
- Peter Hehir as Bert Duggan
- Peter Hernfield as Danny Downer
- Damon Herriman as Frank Errol
- Syd Heylen as Gabby
- Jamie Higgins as Geoff Johnson Sullivan
- Barry Hill as Krull
- Jeffrey Hodgson as Summons Officer
- Nick Holland as Peter Robinson
- Denzil Howson as Mr Hardwicke
- Anna Hruby as Hilda Phipson
- Hamish Hughes as Jim Cook / Max
- Gwyneth Hughes as Ruby Hardwicke
- Robert Hughes

== J ==
- Charmain Jacka as Mrs Cashmore
- Lee James
- Wayne Jarratt as Lieutenant Commander Larry Hartley
- David John as Clifton
- Laurie Jordon as Man in Pub

== K ==
- Lakis Kantzipas as Manoli
- Paul Karo as Reverend Roland
- Keith Kaye as Old Digger / Rabbito
- Carlos Keena as Tony Taylor
- Bill Keller as Manos
- Gerard Kennedy as Sgt Nelson
- Patricia Kennedy as Mother Bernadette
- Trevor Kent as Alister McConnell
- Steven Kenyon as German Soldier
- Jeff Kevin
- Jeremy Kewley as Alan Cochrane
- Steve Kidd as Neil Parkinson
- Bruce Kilpatrick as 'Georgeous' Williams
- Patsy King as Beryl Fletcher
- Margot Knight as Prostitute

== L ==
- Tom Lake as Doctor
- Debra Lawrance as Prue Waterman
- Serge Lazareff
- Joan Letch as Grandma Sullivan
- John Ley as Nino
- Leon Lissek as Hans Kaufman
- Mark Little as Danny Wilson
- Kurt Ludescher as Carl van Druen

== M ==
- Bon Maguire as Postman
- Des Mangan as George Baglin
- Tracy Mann as Angelique
- Jenny Martel as Belly Dancer
- Ingrid Mason as Anna Kaufman
- Terry McDermott as Mr Logan
- Andrew McFarlane as John Sullivan
- Judith McCarthy as Miss Harvey
- Scott McGregor as Jerry Halpern
- John McMahon as Radio Announcer
- Kris McQuade as Lt. Phillipa Heath
- Esme Melville as Mrs Spence
- Neil Melville as Sergeant Pauling / Lecherous Seaman
- Gus Mercurio as George
- Gerhard Metz as Ludemann
- Amber Lyn Mifsud as Young Alice
- Maggie Millar as Elizabeth Bradley
- Carmel Millhouse as Matron
- Steve Millichamp as Littke Ali
- Chris Milne as Billy
- Kylie Minogue as Carla #1
- Dannii Minogue as Carla #2
- Clayton Mitchell as Lance Corporal / Blue
- Richard Moir as Mr Harris
- Douglas Morgan as Taxi Driver
- Richard Morgan as Terry Sullivan
- Rod Mullinar as Alf Donovan
- John Murphy as Alf / Rev Hardy / Vicar
- Dave Murray as Welshman

== N ==
- Sam Neill as Ben Dawson
- Robyn Nevin as Rachael Dawson
- Gerda Nicolson as Mrs Turnbull
- Julie Nihill as Sue Matthews
- Charles Norman as Grandpa Sullivan

== O ==
- Robert Oakley as Whitey
- Roger Oakley as Major Barrington
- John O'May as Yank Sergeant
- John Orcsik as Father Mulcahy

== P ==
- Nick Paidoussis as Vassily
- Apollo Papps as Mohammed / Miklos
- Paul Parker as Changi Prisoner
- Fred Parslow as Mr Jarvis
- Fiona Paul as Maureen Sullivan
- Herbert Payne as Les Jones
- Darius Perkins
- Jack Perry as Mr Jenkins
- Geneviève Picot as Caroline Sullivan
- Ron Pinnell as Toby
- Vera Plevnik as Nadia
- Alex Porteous as McTaggart
- Shane Porteous as Saul
- Saskia Post as Julianna Sleven
- David Price as Sentry
- John Proper as Light Horse President
- Allen Puttock as Corporal / German Sergeant

== R ==
- Lois Ramsey as Mrs Patterson
- Greg Randall as Reg / Soldier
- Warwick Randall as Fireman
- Candy Raymond as Rachele
- Marie Redshaw as Sister Cusack
- Tony Rickards as Bloke chasing a beer / Dance Announcer
- Gina Riley as Elsie
- Colwyn Roberts as Soldier / Recruitikg Officer
- Danny Roberts
- Judith Roberts as Mary Downer
- Tim Robertson as Slicker
- David Robson as Squizzy
- Ilona Rodgers as Kate Meredith
- Tristan Rogers as Jenkins
- Alex Rowe as RSL President / Doctor / Ted Hardwicke
- Peter Rudder as Soldier
- Danny Rukavina as Nicko

== S ==
- Joanne Samuel as Cynthia Cavanaugh
- Peter Sardi as Kev
- Christopher Saunders as Reg Saunders
- Roger Scott as Adjutant Lieutenant
- Sean Scully as Sam Kendall
- Dion Segan
- Dinah Shearing as Mary Sullivan
- Nicholas Skiadopoulis as Priest
- Alister Smart as Paul Hayward
- Damien Smith as Simmo
- Ian Smith as Major
- Lenore Smith as April
- Suzanne Steele as Katherine
- Roger Stephen as Caneraman / Doug
- Penelope Stewart as Edith
- Bryn Lee Stokes as Prince Albert in school play
- Charlie Strachan
- Gary Sweet as Leslie 'Magpie' Maddern

== T ==
- Alex Taifer as Dimitri
- Steven Tandy as Tom Sullivan
- Ron Thomas as Gordy
- Neil Thompson as Captain Green
- Ross Thompson as Max
- Russell Thompson as Turkish Soldier
- Sigrid Thornton as Buffy Turnbull
- Bud Tingwell as Dr Hammond / Doctor / Wuiz Host / Voice of Priest
- Noel Trevarthen as Det. Sgt. Shearer
- Pepe Trevor as Patricia
- Terry Trimble as Frank

== V ==
- Toni Vernon as Caroline Sullivan

== W ==
- Gary Waddell as 'Spook'Skerritt
- Mark Wallace as Kenny Taylor
- John Walton as Michael Watkins
- John Waters as Chris Merchant
- Nick Waters as Horace ' Horrible' Brown / Herb Burns
- Ken Wayne as Army Sergeamy
- Vernon Weaver as Lofty
- Joy Westmore as Madame Florence
- Babs Wheelton as Mrs Duggan
- Megan Williams as Alice Watkins Sullivan / Alice Morgan
- Ross Williams as Robert Edward McCreedy
- Peter Williamson as Fred
- John Wood as Army Sergeant

== Y ==
- Norman Yemm as Norm Baker
- Jodie Yemm as Maisey
- Lesley Yeomans as Nurse

== Z ==
- William Zappa as Antony
