= Norman Hancock =

British naval architect (1916-2003)

Norman Hancock, CB, RCNC (6 March 1916 – 5 August 2003), was a naval architect for the Royal Navy. He was the principal designer the Swiftsure-class submarines, and Director Warship Design responsible for the 1970–2000 surface fleet, including the Type 22 Broadsword-class frigate and Invincible-class aircraft carriers.

== Early life ==
Norman Hancock
- Born: 1916-03-06
- Died: 2003-08-05
- Education: Royal Naval College, Greenwich
- Honours: CB (Companion of the Bath)

Hancock attended Plymouth Grammar School. He joined Devonport Dockyard as a shipwright apprentice in 1932. After fierce competition, he won a cadetship to join the Royal Corps of Naval Constructors. He trained at Royal Naval College, Greenwich. He obtained a first class certificate in early 1940.

== Career ==
In 1940, Hancock started his working life with a brief period in the Director of Naval Construction (DNC) department on cruiser calculations, as an Assistant Constructor 2nd Class. Hancock then moved to Haslar Admiralty Experiment Works, where he worked on hydrodynamics in the testing tank. Hydrodynamics was his specialism, and during his career he developed design methods for fast boat propellers that remained in use until the late 1950s.

In 1943, Hancock was tasked with reviewing anchor design, as Admiral Fraser had complained about wartime destroyers regularly dragging their anchors. He went to Scapa Flow to carry out trials on HMS Anson. At Haslar, he created the first anchor test tank. As a result, the very successful AC14 anchor, stabilised with dihedral surfaces instead of a stock, was developed for surface ships and became the universal design for the Royal Navy.

In 1945, Hancock was in charge of the headquarters (DNC) damage section, as an Acting Constructor. He was dispatched in uniform as Constructor Commander to Bremen, Hamburg, and Kiel to inspect the ships and their designs from the perspective of damage protection. Information was obtained from the Kriegsmarine designers and survivors of the Bismarck, Scharnhorst, and Tirpitz actions.

After VJ day, Hancock travelled to Japan to investigate damage and design issues in the Japanese fleet. Much useful information about aircraft carrier vulnerability, construction of the vast battleships and carriers, and loss of the battleship Yamato following torpedo attack was obtained.

Hancock served an appointment in Singapore dockyard for three years (date unknown). Hancock then returned to DNC and worked on Frigate Design as a Chief Constructor.

In 1957, Hancock was appointed as the Professor of Naval Architecture at Royal Naval College, Greenwich, training the next generation of Constructors for five years, He set about rewriting the syllabus, which he described "dreadfully old-fashioned". (Note: Not 1954 as in Times obituary).

In 1963, Hancock was appointed as Assistant Director Construction for Submarines, excluding Polaris. He led on the design of the Swiftsure and Trafalgar-class submarines.

In 1969, Hancock was appointed Director Warship Design, with a department responsible for warship design separate from submarines (Director Project Teams Submarines) and building (Director of Ship Production). He was responsible for the development of the Bristol, Sheffield, Broadsword and Invincible classes.

Hancock was appointed CB (Companion of the Bath) on his retirement in 1976.

His obituary describes Hancock's approach as:

"Hancock's strength lay in his high intelligence and mastery of technical detail. His management style was often described as overbearing and obtained results more by driving than leading. But from the point of view of the taxpayer, his close personal supervision of work of contracted shipbuilders was beneficial, hover prickly the relationship sometimes became."

== Submarine design - Swiftsure class ==
Hancock led the design of the radically new Swiftsure-class submarine, developed under the designation SSN0X. Hancock described his overall approach to the design as:

"Our aims were to simplify wherever possible by cleaning up and removing all unnecessary duplication and to introduce the necessary improvements which would produce a faster, stealthier, safer, deeper diving and more easily maintainable weapons platform."

The pressure hull was fixed at the same diameter throughout, simplifying the structure design and the construction from the Valiant class. The main sonar and torpedo tubes were reposition. The design focused on reducing the radiated noise signature of the submarines, reducing the chances of detection distance materially. Hancock set up a Noise Reduction Panel focused on the practical and detailed measures to be adopted. The machinery raft was designed to avoid "noise shorts" (direct contact to the hull resulting in direct transmission of noise into the sea). Whilst Swiftsure used a propellor, pump-jet propulsors were adopted for the rest of the class, reducing propellor noise. Later in their lives, submarines were also covered with acoustic tiles. Overall, Swiftsure set a new standard for quiet submarines for NATO and USSR.

The Swiftsure class (and the follow on enhanced quieter Trafalgar class) proved to be highly adaptable. Towed array sonars were fitted, substantially increasing detection ranges. Acoustic tiles were applied to the hulls. Sub-Harpoon anti-ship missiles, Spearfish torpedo, and Tomahawk cruise missiles were fitted to the class.

== Surface ship designs ==
As Director Warship Design from 1969, Hancock was responsible for new surface ship designs.

The Type 42 Sheffield class was designed as and air-defence destroyer in the early 1960s. There was pressure from the Admiralty Board to restrict the size and cost below that of the Bristol and County classes. This was linked to a desire to restrict the length of the ship with negative consequences. MK Purvis as Project Leader identified limitations that were necessary to achieve the price: Leander class standard (except for main machinery), No margin for future modernisation was included. Examples of cost cutting decisions were: single anchor, combined workshop, single galley for all crew. HMS Sheffield was commissioned in February 1975, and sank in the Falklands conflict in May 1982.

These limitations proved significant. Type 42 Batch 3 designs were increased in length from 125 metres (410 ft 1 in) to 141 m (462 ft 7 in). This provided additional capacity for modernisation (including the addition of Phalanx close-in weapon systems). The longer length also had the consequence that the ships maximum speed increased from 28.5 knots (52.8 km/h; 32.8 mph) to 30 knots (56 km/h; 35 mph). HMS Manchester was commissioned in December 1982, half-crewed by survivors of the Sheffield and Coventry sinkings in the Falklands earlier that year.

The Type 22 Broadsword class was designed as an anti-submarine frigate to replace the Leander class. Initial designs were produced by RJ Daniel and his Forward Design Group in 1968. It was initially intended to be an Anglo-Dutch collaboration, but agreement on weapons fit could not be achieved. The final class was designed by A Bull and AJ Creighton. As an ant-submarine warfare frigate, a large hangar was adopted to house two Westland Lynx helicopters. Noise reduction was a priority. A complete gas turbine propulsion was select (COGOG). The new Seawolf missile system was adopted. The design provided spacious accommodation for a crew of 215 (with a substantial margin to carry 250). Overall, the Type 22 is faster and more seaworthy than the Type 42. Broadsword was commissioned in May 1979.

The Invincible class was subject to material political uncertainty. The class had been designed as a Helicopter carrier during 1966–1967, by Constructors JC Lawrence and AA Austin. The ships as command and control centres for anti-submarine warfare. The options were between a 12,500-and-17,500-tonne (12,300-and-17,200-long-ton) ship. The larger 17,500-tonne ship was selected with unobstructed flight deck and a large through-deck hangar. Gas turbine propulsion was selected. Late in the build of HMS Invincible, the innovative 'ski-jump' had been developed. Hancock was initially not in favour of incorporating the ski-jump into the Invincible design because of the potential cost and time over-runs. However, a version was incorporated into HMS Invincible and HMS Illustrious, with a steeper version built into HMS Ark Royal. In 1980, the Invincible class became for the first ships with 'ski-jumps' and the largest with gas turbine propulsions.

== Class designs ==
- Swiftsure-class submarine Naval architect/Chief Constructor: Norman Hancock.
- Type 42 Sheffield class Naval Architect/Chief Constructor: MK Purvis.
- Type 22 Broadsword class Naval architect/Chief Constructor: Roland John Daniel, A Bull, AJ Creighton.
- Invincible class Naval architect/Chief Constructor: JC Lawrence and AA Austin.
