= Ex on the Beach Poland series 1 =

Ex on the Beach Poland
- Season 1
- No. of episodes: 8

Release
- Original network: MTV
- Original release: 7 November – 26 December 2016

Series chronology
- Next → Series 2

The first series of Ex on the Beach Poland, a Polish television programme, began airing on 7 November 2016 on MTV. The show was announced in 17 October 2016. Cast member for this series include Warsaw Shore star Wojtek Gola. The series was filmed in Croatia.

== Cast ==
The official list of cast members was released on 24 October 2016 and includes four single boys: Adam Zając, Dawid Ambro, Michał Spała and Warsaw Shore cast member Wojtek Gola; as well as four single girls; Joanna Kościak, Jola Mróz, Marta Różańska and Sandra Sarapata.

- **Bold** indicates original cast member; all other cast were brought into the series as an ex.

Episodes	Name	Age (at start of series)	Hometown	Exes
8	**Adam Zając**	25	Sosnowiec	—N/a
8	**Dawid Ambro**	26	Szczecin	Ewelina Polak
8	**Joanna Kościak**	25	Warsaw	—N/a
8	**Jola Mróz**		Rybnik	Łukasz Lupa
4	**Marta Różańska**		Pleszew	Wojtek Gola
8	**Michał Spała**	22	Porajów	—N/a
8	**Sandra Sarapata**	18	Wadowice	Olaf Bober
7	**Wojtek Gola**	28	Poznań	Patrycja Strzałkowska, Marta Różańska, Karina Pietruszyńska
8	Patrycja Strzałkowska	23	Warsaw	Wojtek Gola
6	Łukasz Lupa	22	Rawicz	Jola Mróz, Ewelina Skorczyk
6	Ewelina Polak	25	Stockholm	Dawid Ambro
5	Karina Pietruszyńska	23	Radomin	Wojtek Gola, Krystian Wilczak
4	Olaf Bober	19	Wadowice	Sandra Sarapata
3	Krystian Wilczak	23	Bydgoszcz	Karina Pietruszyńska
2	Ewelina Skorczyk		Śmigiel	Łukasz Lupa

=== Duration of cast ===
Cast members	Episodes							
Cast members	1	2	3	4	5	6	7	8
Adam								
Dawid								
Joanna								
Jola								
Marta								
Michał								
Sandra								
Wojtek								
Patrycja								
Łukasz								
Ewelina P								
Karina								
Olaf								
Krystian								
Ewelina S								

==== Notes ====
Key: = "Cast member" is featured in this episode.
Key: = "Cast member" arrives on the beach.
Key: = "Cast member" has an ex arrive on the beach.
Key: = "Cast member" arrives on the beach and has an ex arrive during the same episode.
Key: = "Cast member" leaves the beach.
Key: = "Cast member" does not feature in this episode.

== Episodes ==
No. overall	No. in season	Title	Duration	Polish viewers	Original release date
1	1	"Episode 1"	60 minutes	TBA	7 November 2016
2	2	"Episode 2"	60 minutes	TBA	14 November 2016
3	3	"Episode 3"	60 minutes	TBA	21 November 2016
4	4	"Episode 4"	60 minutes	TBA	28 November 2016
5	5	"Episode 5"	60 minutes	TBA	5 December 2016
6	6	"Episode 6"	60 minutes	TBA	12 December 2016
7	7	"Episode 7"	60 minutes	TBA	19 December 2016
8	8	"Episode 8"	60 minutes	TBA	26 December 2016
