= List of The Andy Griffith Show guest stars =

In addition to the regular and recurring cast members of The Andy Griffith Show (1960–1968), the show had many guest stars. Some were known prior to their appearance, while others became well-known later.

Note: Episode titles are followed by the season and episode no., e.g. 2.24 means the 24th episode of the second season.

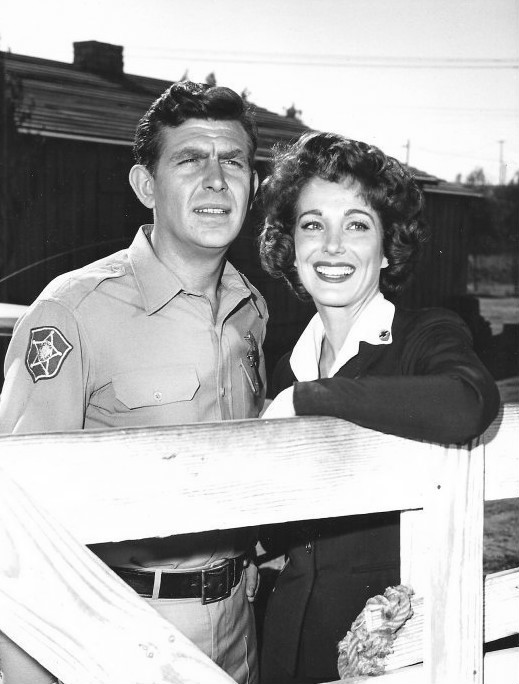
Andy Griffith and Julie Adams

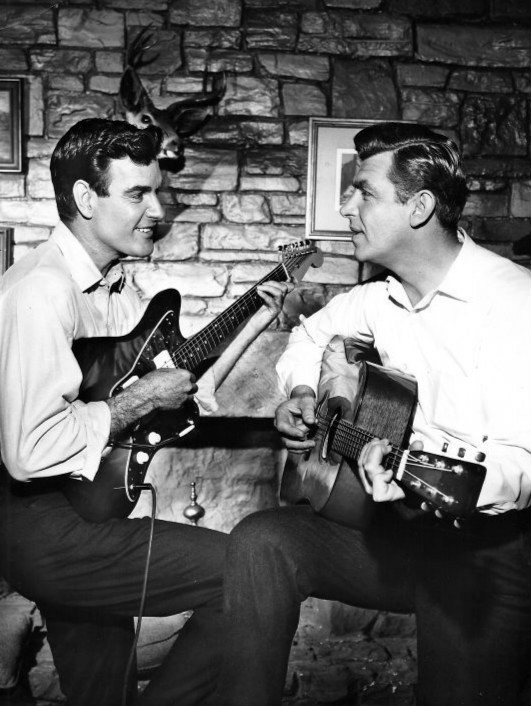
James Best and Griffith

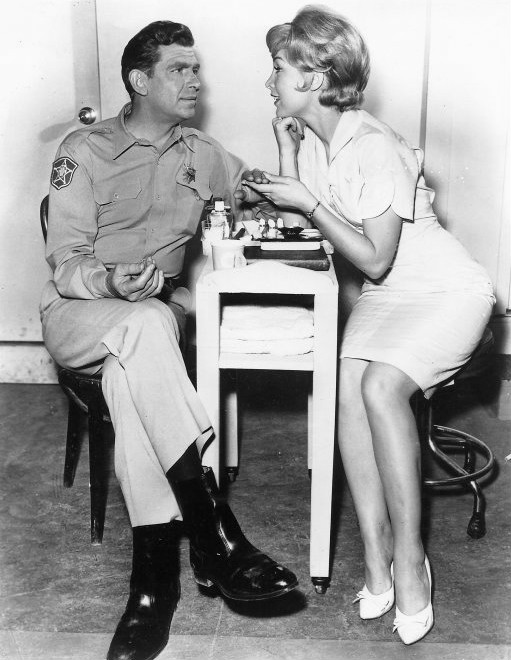
Griffith and Barbara Eden

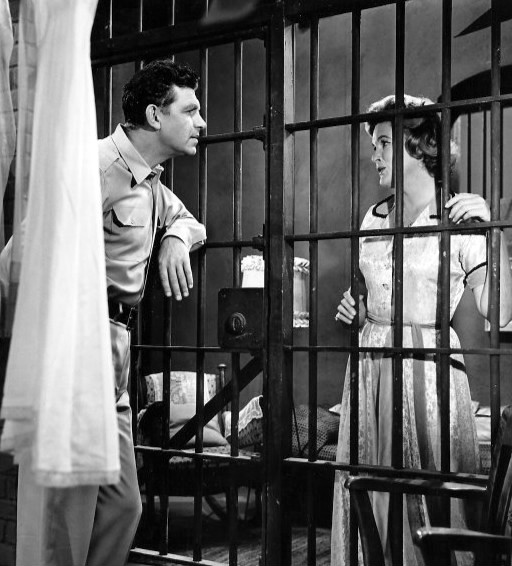
Griffith and Jean Hagen

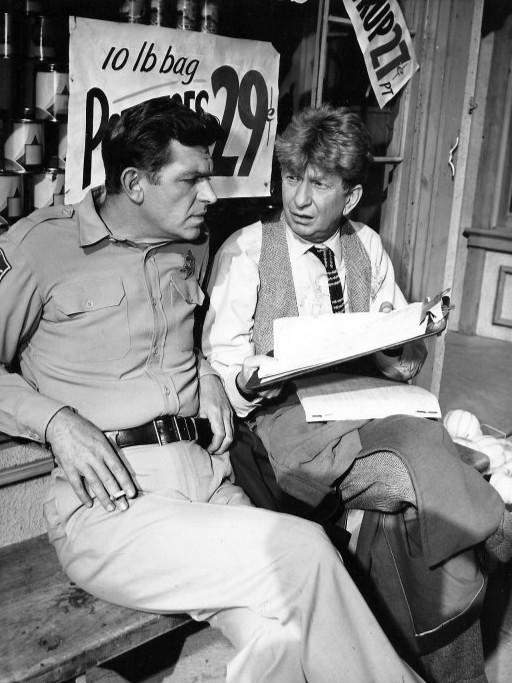
Griffith and Sterling Holloway

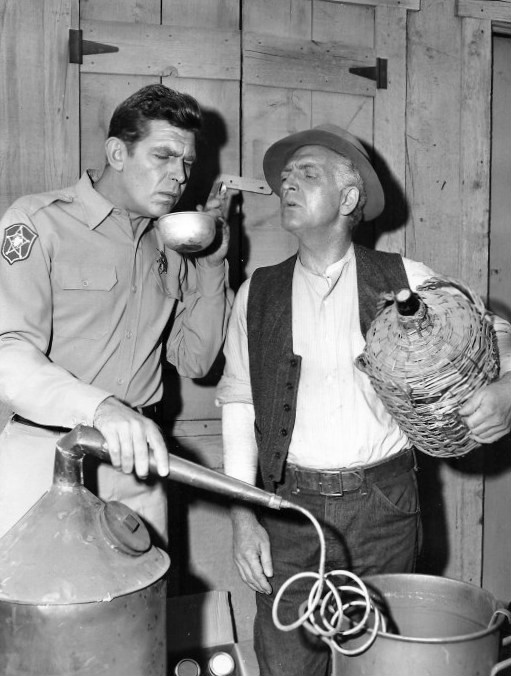
Griffith and Everett Sloane

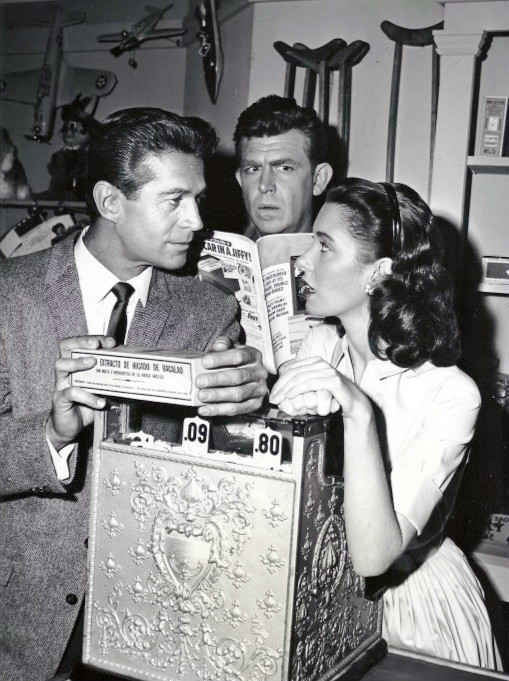
George Nader, Griffith, and Elinor Donahue (1961)

Guest star	Role(s)	Episode(s)	Notes
Julie Adams	Nurse Mary Simpson	"The County Nurse" (2.24)	
Jack Albertson	Bradford J. Taylor	"Aunt Bee's Cousin" (8.13)	Later known for Chico and the Man, Willy Wonka & the Chocolate Factory, and The Fox and the Hound
Norman Alden	Tom Strongbow; Hank	"The Battle of Mayberry" (6.29) "Howard, the Bowler" (8.02)	Known for voice work including as Aquaman in Super Friends and The All-New Super Friends Hour
Leon Ames	Mr. Hampton	"The Senior Play" (7.09)	Known for the role of Col. Gordon Kirkwood on Mister Ed
Jack Bannon	Announcer	"The Mayberry Chef" (8.17)	Later known for portraying Art Donovan on Lou Grant
James Best	Jim Lindsey	"The Guitar Player" (1.03) "The Guitar Player Returns" (1.31)	Best known for playing Sheriff Rosco P. Coltrane on The Dukes of Hazzard
Bill Bixby	Ronald Bailey	"Bailey's Bad Boy" (2.15)	Later starred in My Favorite Martian, The Courtship of Eddie's Father and The Incredible Hulk
Whitney Blake	Lee Drake	"Andy's Trip to Raleigh" (8.04)	Known for playing Dorothy Baxter on Hazel (1961–65)
Morgan Brittany	Mary Alice Carter	"Opie's First Love" (8.01)	Known for playing Katherine Wentworth on Dallas
Edgar Buchanan	Henry Wheeler	"Aunt Bee's Brief Encounter" (2.09)	Known for playing Joseph "Uncle Joe" Carson on Petticoat Junction
Richard Bull	Bill Lindsay; Mr. Jackson	"Goober Makes History" (7.14) "Opie's Piano Lesson" (7.26)	Known for playing Nels Oleson on Little House on the Prairie. Bull was not in "Goober Makes History", although he is listed in the end credits. Sandy Kenyon played Bill Lindsay.
Frank Cady	Luke; Farley Upchurch	"The Rehabilitation of Otis" (5.18) "The Legend of Barney Fife" (6.18)	Known for playing Sam Drucker on Green Acres (1963–70)
Mary Grace Canfield	Mary Grace Gossage	"A Date for Gomer" (4.09)	Known for portraying Ralph Monroe on Green Acres (1965–1971)
William Christopher	Dr. Peterson; Mr. Heathcoat	"A New Doctor in Town" (7.15) "Aunt Bee on TV" (6.18)	Known for portraying Father Mulcahy on M*A*S*H
Andy Clyde	Frank Myers	"Mayberry Goes Bankrupt" (2.04)	Longtime comedic character actor in Westerns and numerous television family series
Jackie Coogan	George Stevens	"Barney on the Rebound" (2.05)	Known for The Kid and for playing Uncle Fester on The Addams Family
Ellen Corby	Myrt 'Hubcaps' Lesh	"Barney's First Car" (3.27)	Known for playing Grandma Esther Walton on The Waltons
Gail Davis	Karen Moore	"The Perfect Female" (2.08)	Played the title role in Annie Oakley television series
John Dehner	Colonel Harvey	"Aunt Bee's Medicine Man" (3.24)	Before becoming an actor, he worked as an animator at Walt Disney Studios. He played the part of veteran magazine editor Cy Bennett for two seasons (1971–1973) on the weekly sitcom The Doris Day Show
Bob Denver	Dudley "Dud" Wash	"Divorce, Mountain Style" (4.25)	Known for playing Gilligan on Gilligan's Island
Buddy Ebsen	Dave Browne	"Opie's Hobo Friend" (2.06)	Known for his role as Jed Clampett on The Beverly Hillbillies
Barbara Eden	Ellen Brown	"The Manicurist" (2.16)	Eden starred in I Dream of Jeannie (1965–70)
Robert Emhardt	Malcolm Tucker; Willard Foster	"Man in a Hurry" (3.06) "The Foster Lady" (6.26)	Frequent type-A personality character actor in movies and television. Was the psychiatrist opposite Andy Griffith in the 1955 United States Steel Hour version of No Time for Sergeants
Jamie Farr	Sylvio	"The Gypsies" (6.23)	Known for the role of Max Klinger on M*A*S*H
Teri Garr	Girl in Red Convertible	"The Wedding" (8.26)	Until then she was an uncredited dancer in Elvis Presley movies
Dabbs Greer	Mr. Sims, Naylor, Sales Clerk, Councilman Dobbs	4 episodes	Portrayed Reverend Robert Alden on Little House on the Prairie
Ann Morgan Guilbert	Ella	"Aunt Bee's Cousin" (8.13)	Known for playing Millie Helper on The Dick Van Dyke Show and Yetta on The Nanny
Jean Hagen	Elizabeth Crowley	"Andy and the Woman Speeder" (2.3)	Played the ditzy Lina Lamont in Singin' in the Rain and Marjorie Williams on The Danny Thomas Show
Alan Hale, Jr.	"Big Jeff" Pruitt	"The Farmer Takes a Wife" (2.13)	Known for playing the Skipper on Gilligan's Island and had his own earlier series playing famed railroad engineer Casey Jones
Howard Hesseman	Counterboy; Harry	"Goober Goes to an Auto Show" (8.22) "Sam for Town Council" (8.27)	Credited as Don Sturdy. Best known roles are Dr. Johnny Fever on WKRP in Cincinnati and Charles P. Moore on Head of the Class
Bob Hastings	Governor's Aide	"Barney and the Governor" (3.15)	Best known for portraying Lt. Elroy Carpenter, a bumbling yes-man on the 1960s sitcom McHale's Navy
Pat Hingle	Fred Gibson	"Wyatt Earp Rides Again" (6.20)	Played Commissioner James Gordon in Batman, Batman Returns, Batman Forever, and Batman & Robin
Sterling Holloway	Burt Miller	"The Merchant of Mayberry" (2.22)	A veteran of numerous films, Holloway was also the voice of Winnie the Pooh
Bo Hopkins	George	"Goober the Executive" (8.16)	Played "Little Joe Young" in both American Graffiti (1973) and More American Graffiti (1979); His final role was as "Papaw Vance" in Hillbilly Elegy (2020)
Larry Hovis	Gilly Walker	"Goober Takes a Car Apart" (5.17) "The Case of the Punch in the Nose" (3.14)	Played Pvt. Larry Gotschalk on Gomer Pyle, U.S.M.C. as well as Sgt. Andrew Carter on Hogan's Heroes
Rance Howard	Bus driver Governor's chauffeur Treasury agent Party guest	"Cousin Virgil" (2.30) "Barney and the Governor" (3.15) "A Black Day for Mayberry" (4.07) "The Rumor" (4.29)	Howard is the father of Ron Howard and Clint Howard
George Kennedy	George	"The Big House" (3.32)	Among his movie credits are Cool Hand Luke, Airport '77 and The Naked Gun
Charles Lane	Mr. Frisby	"Aunt Bee the Crusader" (4.15)	Lane portrayed J. Homer Bedloe on Petticoat Junction
Sue Ane Langdon	Nurse Mary	"Three's A Crowd" (2.27)	
Gavin MacLeod	Gilbert Jamel; Bryan Bender	"TV or Not TV (5.23) "The Taylors in Hollywood" (6.08)	Portrayed Murray Slaughter on The Mary Tyler Moore Show and Capt. Merrill Stubing in The Love Boat
Florence MacMichael	Hilda Mae	"Ellie for Council" (1.10) "Andy Saves Barney's Morale" (1.20)	
Laurie Main	Robling Flask	"Helen, the Authoress" (7.24)	Known for hosting and narrating for Welcome to Pooh Corner, as well as narrating for many "Disney Read-Along" records and cassettes
Sid Melton	Pat Michaels	"The Hollywood Party" (6.09)	Melton was "Uncle Charley" Halper on The Danny Thomas Show and Alf Monroe on Green Acres
Allan Melvin	Clarence 'Doc' Malloy; Hotel Detective Bardoli; Neal; Jake (Myrt's Accomplice); Recruiting Sergeant; Escaped Prisoner; Fred Plummer; Clyde Plaunt	"Jailbreak" (2.18) "Andy and Barney in the Big City" (2.25) "Lawman Barney" (3.7) "Barney's First Car" (3.27) "Ernest T. Bass Joins the Army" (4.3) "Andy's Vacation" (4.22) "Barney's Uniform" (5.8) "Howard's Main Event" (8.6)	On Gomer Pyle, U.S.M.C., he was Sgt. Carter's rival, Sgt. Hacker, the mess cook; also noted for his roles as Sam Franklin on The Brady Bunch and Barney Hefner on All in the Family
Alvy Moore	Kitchenware salesman	"A Baby in the House" (6.25)	Played Hank Kimball on Green Acres
Burt Mustin	Jud Fletcher, Jubal, Sam Benson and Mr. Crowley	14 episodes	Played Gus the fireman on Leave It to Beaver
George Nader	Dr. Robert Benson	"The New Doctor" (1.24)	Played a handsome new doctor in Mayberry, he was starred in the movie Robot Monster
Jack Nicholson	Baby's father Defendant	"Opie Finds a Baby" (7.10) "Aunt Bee the Juror" (8.07)	
Hank Patterson	Hobo	"If I Had a Quarter-Million" (5.22)	Known for playing farmer Fred Ziffel on Green Acres
Roger Perry	George Jones	"Don't Miss a Good Bet" (7.16)	Known for playing Mr. Parker on The Facts of Life
Barney Phillips	Eddie Brooke	"Barney Gets His Man" (1.30)	Known for playing "Haley the Bartender" in The Twilight Zone
Michael J. Pollard	Virgil	"Cousin Virgil" (2.30)	Played C.W. Moss in Bonnie and Clyde
Rob Reiner	Joe	"Goober's Contest" (7.30)	Played Michael Stivic on All in the Family
Don Rickles	Newton Munroe	"The Luck of Newton Munroe" (5.29)	
Hayden Rorke	A.J. Considine	"The Taylors in Hollywood" (6.08)	Known for his portrayal of Col. Alfred E. Bellows, M.D. on I Dream of Jeannie
Bing Russell	Mr. Burton	"The Loaded Goat" (3.18)	Portrayed Deputy Clem Foster on Bonanza
William Schallert	Quiet Sam Becker	"Quiet Sam" (1.29)	Portrayed Martin Lane (Patty's father) on The Patty Duke Show
Fred Sherman	H. Fred Goss (dry cleaner/tailor)	"Jailbreak" (2.18) "Wedding Bells for Aunt Bee" (2.26)	Suffered a stroke following his 2nd appearance as Mr. Goss, forcing his retirement from the show.
Karl Swenson	Mr. McBeevee	"Mr. McBeevee" (3.01)	Played Lars Hanson on Little House on the Prairie (1974–78)
Mary Treen	Rose Pine; Clara Lindsey	"The New Housekeeper" (1.01); "Ellie for Council" (1.10); "Those Gossipin' Men" (1.15)	
Lee Van Cleef	Skip	"Banjo-Playing Deputy" (5.32)	Played the villain Angel Eyes in The Good, the Bad and the Ugly
Jerry Van Dyke	Jerry Miller	"Banjo-Playing Deputy" (5.32)	He later portrayed Luther Van Dam on Coach
Joyce Van Patten	Laura Hollander	"Opie Steps Up in Class" (8.05)	Van Patten is the sister of actor Dick Van Patten
Doodles Weaver	George Bricker; Regis	"Aunt Bee's Brief Encounter" (2.09) "A Black Day for Mayberry" (4.07)	Weaver was the brother of former NBC president Pat Weaver and the uncle of actress Sigourney Weaver
Clarence White	The Country Boys member	"Mayberry on Record" (1.19)	White was lead guitarist for The Kentucky Colonels, and later, The Byrds.
