= Battle of Ostrołęka (1831) =

November Uprising battle

Coordinates: 53°05′00″N 21°35′00″E

- Part of Polish–Russian War 1830–1831
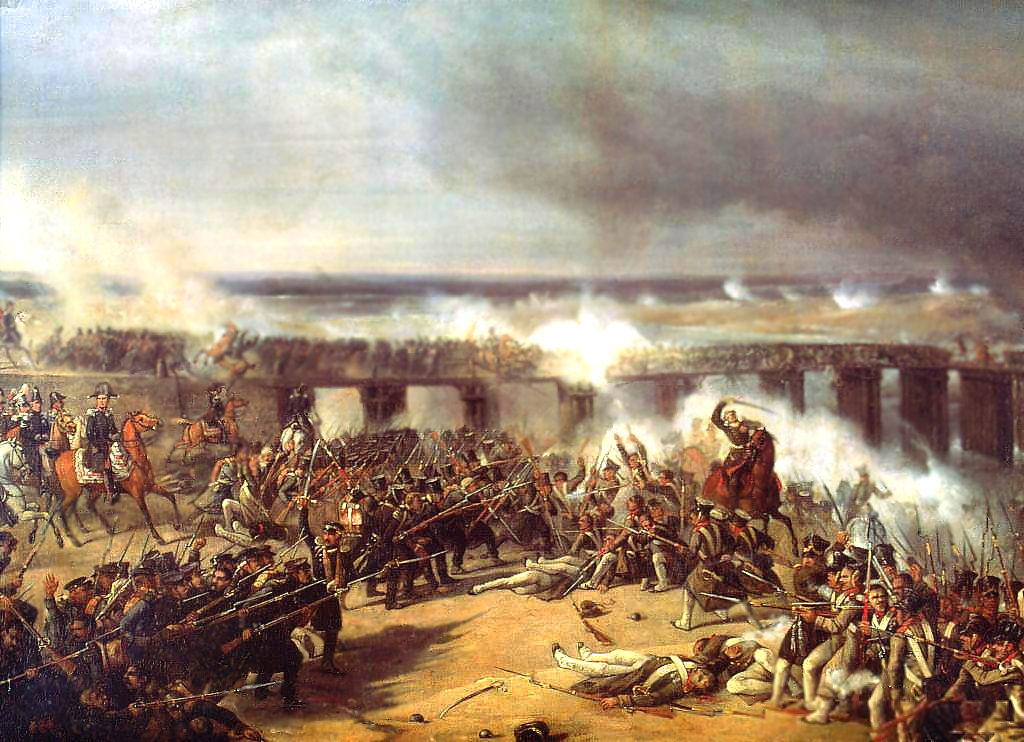
- "Battle of Ostrołęka of 1831", an 1838 painting by Karol Malankiewicz
Date	26 May 1831
Location	Ostrołęka, Poland
Result	Russian victory

Belligerents
Congress Poland	Russian Empire

Commanders and leaders
Jan Skrzynecki; Józef Bem; Tomasz Łubieński; Władysław Zamoyski; Ludwik Bogusławski; Ignacy Prądzyński; Henryk Dembinski; Ambroży Skarżyński; Maciej Rybiński; Henryk Kamieński †; Ludwik Pac; Jerzy Langermann; Karol Turno	Hans von Diebitsch; Pavel Lopukhin; Ivan Nabokov; Friedrich von Berg; Georg von Nostitz; Karl von Toll; Karl von Bistram (WIA); Nikolay Martynov; Mikhail Gorchakov; Peter von der Pahlen; Carl Manderstierna; Ivan Shakhovskoy

Strength
48,467, 138 cannons: 32,000 engaged	53,262, 245 cannons: 38,000 engaged

Casualties and losses
6,400 or 8,000 dead or 9,000 casualties 3 cannons	5,000 to 5,700

The Battle of Ostrołęka (Note: Polish: Bitwa pod Ostrołęką; Russian: Битва при Остроленке, lit. 'Battle of Ostrolenka') took place on 26 May 1831, and was one of the largest engagements of Poland's November Uprising. Throughout the day, Polish forces under Jan Skrzynecki fought for the control over the town of Ostrołęka against the assaulting Russian forces of Hans Karl von Diebitsch. Although by the end of the day the town was still in Polish hands and the two sides suffered comparable losses, the battle is usually considered a Polish defeat because of the Russian army's almost unlimited strategic reinforcement capability. The Polish Army could not similarly replenish its casualties. It had been seriously depleted by the battle and was in a state of exhaustion, resulting in the Poles abandoning Ostrołęka that night. Diebitsch had the opportunity to end the uprising at that moment with one decisive blow, but due to fresh Polish forces nearby and lack of information on the state of Skrzynecki's army, he did not do so.

In the event, surviving Polish forces were saved by its 4th Line Infantry Regiment (known by its nickname of "Czwartacy" – lit. "those of the Fourth") who repelled several waves of enemy infantry and cavalry charges, holding the burning town during heavy fighting in close quarters. By late evening the Poles were again saved by a self-sacrificing charge of the 4th Mounted Artillery Battery under Lt.Col. Józef Bem.

== The battle ==
On the morning of 26 May, most of the Polish army was west of the Narew River except for General Tomasz Łubieński's 5th Infantry Division (part of the II Corps), and General Ludwik Bogusławski's 4th Line Infantry Regiment, which were still east of Ostrołęka. Łubieński's orders from Ignacy Prądzyński was to "defend yourself through the day to come", despite facing Russian forces four times his size. The danger, according to the commanding officer of the Polish Cavalry Brigade, General Karol Turno, was in being trapped and pushed into the river as occurred in the Battle of Berezina. The Russian army made contact at 06:00 with the arrival of forces under General Georg von Nostitz, and the battle began at 09:00 when Friedrich von Berg arrived. The Polish resistance forced Nostitz to wait for the arrival of the rest of Field Marshal Diebitsch's forces, which included Generals Nabokov, Lopukhin, Manderstierna and Shakhovskoy. By 10:00, Łubieński was forced back to Ostrołęka on the Narew, with some protection from Prądzyński's guns and veterans located on the sandy hills to the west. The Polish headquarters were moved to Kruki, further to the west, on the Omulew River, a tributary of the Narew

Skrzynecki ordered Bogusławski to "defend the town to the death" with mainly the 4th Infantry Regiment and two batteries of four cannons each. The 1st and 2nd Battalions of the 4th Infantry Regiment were deployed south of Ostrołęka, opposite the road to Rzekuń, the 3rd Battalion on the road to Goworki and the 4th Battalion protecting the bridges. The 3rd Battalion took up defence inside the St. Anthony's Bernardine Monastery near the market, the only brick building in Ostrołęka.

By 11:00 Diebitsch had arrived and ordered the 1st Cuirasseur Guard Division to attack from the northern highway while the Astrakhan Grenadier Regiment attacked from Rzekuń to the south, forcing the 1st and 4th Battalions to retreat in disarray, exposing the bridges, and forcing the "Czwartacy" in to help as the fighting moved in the direction of the market, almost trapping the Poles. The constant cannonade caught buildings on fire, forcing the inhabitants to flee into the streets and market where the battle was raging and "Ostrołęka would begin more and more to resemble hell". Finally, Bogusławski ordered a retreat to the bridges, only to find they were in the process of being dismantled, forcing some of his soldiers to cross the river by swimming. His defence had lasted only an hour and was disastrous for the 4th Infantry Regiment, with 16 officers lost and 782 soldiers killed, wounded or captured. Diebitsch now had the opportunity of using the bridges the Poles did not have time to dismantle, to cross the Narew.

By now, Karl Wilhelm von Toll had 62 guns sweeping the Poles and Diebitsch ordered the Astrakhan Regiment to cross the river using boards from the Ostrołęka homes to repair the damaged bridges. General Karl von Bistram was at the head of the Astrakhanians and captured one of the bridges by storm, but was shell-shocked; he was awarded the Order of St. George. Ludwik Michał Pac then gathered remnants of the 3rd and 4th Battalions of the 4th Infantry Regiment, at 12:00, along with the 3rd Infantry Division to fight for the bridges. General Nikolay Martynov brought forward Suvorovites to help Astrakhanians. At 13:00, Maciej Rybiński's 1st Infantry Division was called in to help defend the bridges. At 15:00, Skrzynecki called for an ill-fated cavalry attack, the remnants of which were withdrawn by 17:00. By 18:00, the remnants of the 5th Infantry Division retreated in disorder to the rear, by which time two both Ludwik Kicki and Henryk Ignacy Kamieński were dead.

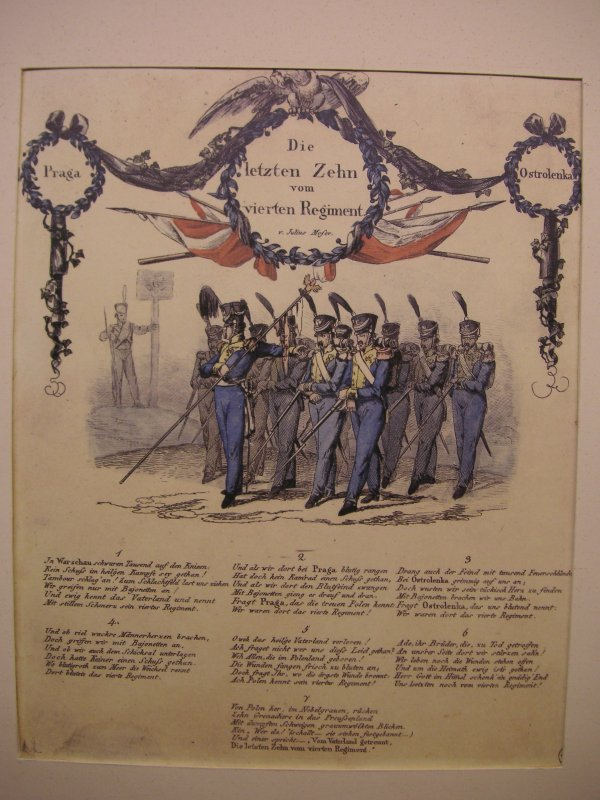
A German poem glorifying the 4th Regiment's actions at Ostrołęka

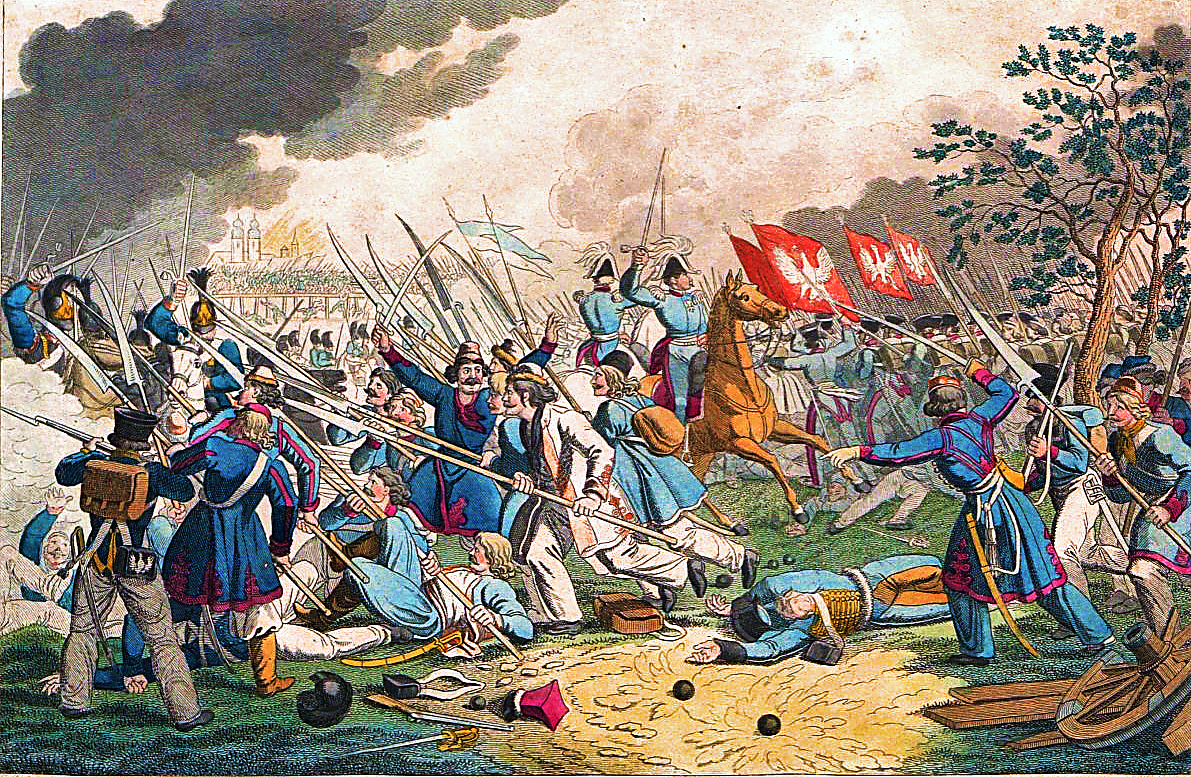
The battle on a 19th-century gravure by Georg Benedikt Wunder

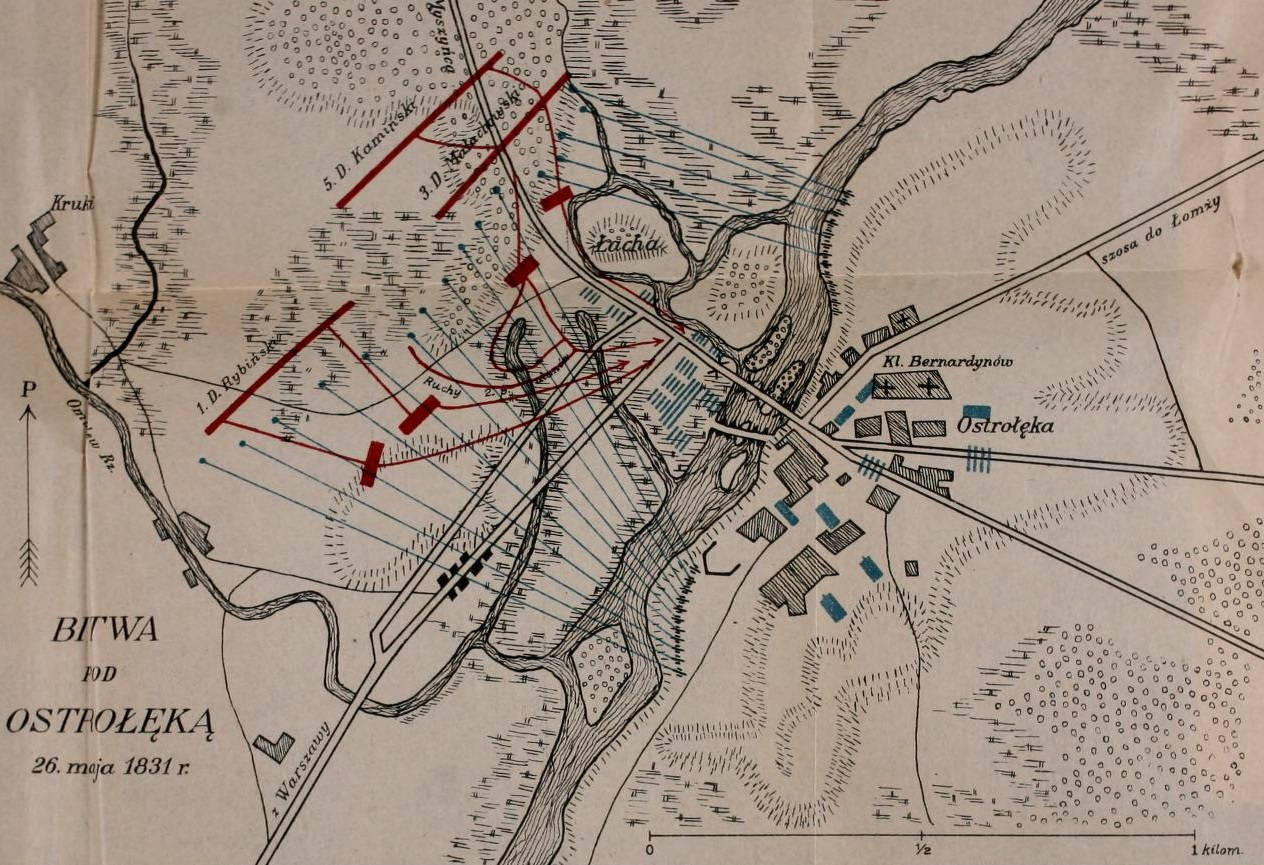
Map of Ostrołęka

At 19:00, Lt. Col. Józef Bem and Henryk Dembiński manoeuvred to make the Russians think the Poles still had reserve forces hidden behind the hills which would cost Diebitsch dearly if he continued to advance. Bem's 4th Mounted Artillery Battery was so close to the Russian lines when they dismounted that Bem had three Platoons use grenades and bullets and the last two used grapeshot. Silence prevailed until Bem ordered his cannons to fire, at which time the entire Russian line of artillery responded. This lasted for about half an hour during which time Bem fired two hundred and fifty times. The effect of Bem's "terrible shots" was to cut out the ranks of grenadiers in the streets, and the impression on Diebitsch was enough that he withdrew most of his troops from the bank of the Narew under cover of darkness.

Between 20:00 and 22:00, Skrzynecki held a war council with his generals: Łubieński, Prądzyński, Skarżyński, Rybiński, Dembiński, Turno and Langermann in which they agreed to march towards Różan and then towards Warsaw, with Dembiński in command of the rearguard.

General Mikhail Gorchakov distinguished himself during the battle.

== In popular culture ==
The battle became one of the symbols of the failed uprising. Julius Mosen, a German poet and writer, commemorated the 4th Regiment in his poem Die letzten Zehn vom vierten Regiment (The last 10 of the 4th Regiment), later widely translated onto several languages. The battle also inspired Johan Sebastian Welhaven's Republikanerne. The Hungarian national poet Sándor Petőfi, who fought in the Hungarian War of Independence under the Polish general Józef Bem against the Austrians and the Russians, praised Bem as the hero of the battle of Ostrołęka in his poem Az erdélyi hadsereg (The Army of Transylvania) from 1849:

"Why should we not win? We're led by Bem,
The old champion of freedom!
The bloody star of Ostrolenka
Leads us with its avenging brightness."

== See also ==
- Mausoleum of the Battle of Ostrolenka 26 May 1831
