= Energa =

Polish power company

Energa SA
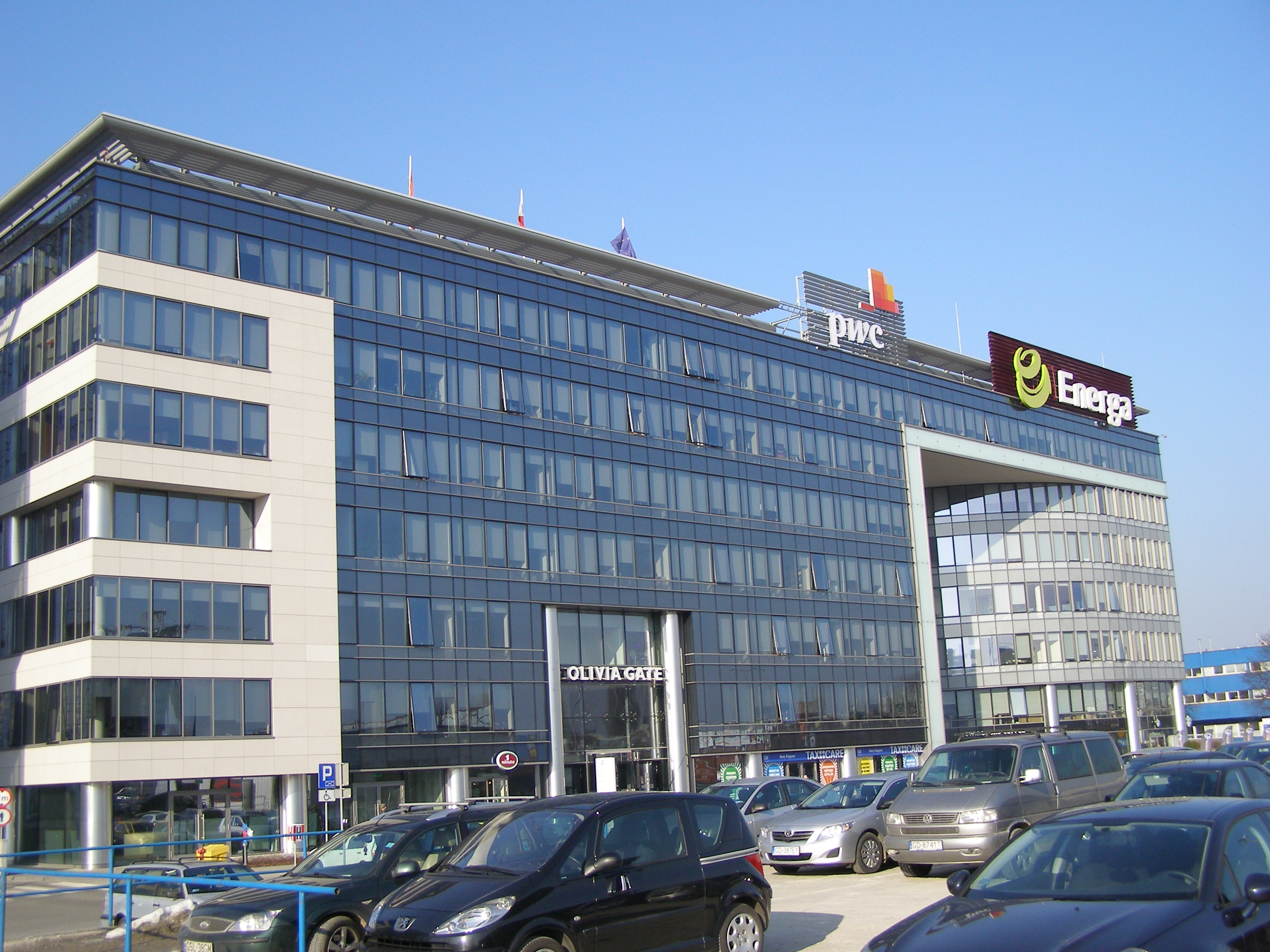
- Company headquarters at Olivia Gate in Gdańsk
- Company type: Spółka Akcyjna
- ISIN: PLENERG00022
- Industry: Distribution network operator
- Founded: 2006; 20 years ago
- Headquarters: al. Grunwaldzka 472 80-309 Gdańsk
- Key people: Magdalena Kamińska (President of the Management Board); Renata Rosiak (Chairman of the supervisory board)
- Revenue: PLN 10.5 billion (2017)
- Net income: 173,000,000 euro (2018)
- Owner: PKN Orlen (2020–present)
- Number of employees: 9,144 (2014)
- Website: grupa.energa.pl/en

Energa SA is a Polish corporate group which deals in the generation, distribution, and supplies electricity to approximately 2.7 million people in Northern Poland. Energa is Poland's third largest distribution network operator serving North and Central Poland, with the other major distributors being; The Tauron Group, Enea SA, and PGE Polska Grupa Energetyczna.

Energa's area of operation - Light Green

== History ==
The Energa Group was created in 2006 following a merger of Koncern Energetyczny ENERGA SA and Zespół Elektrownia Ostrołęka.

In March 2020, PKN Orlen's plan to take over Energa was approved by the European Union's executive body. In April 2020, it was announced that the Polish company was acquired by PKN Orlen.

== Board ==
- Alicja Barbara Klimiuk - Vice President, Acting President
- Grzegorz Ksepko - Vice President
- Jacek Kościelniak - Vice President

== Capitol Group ==
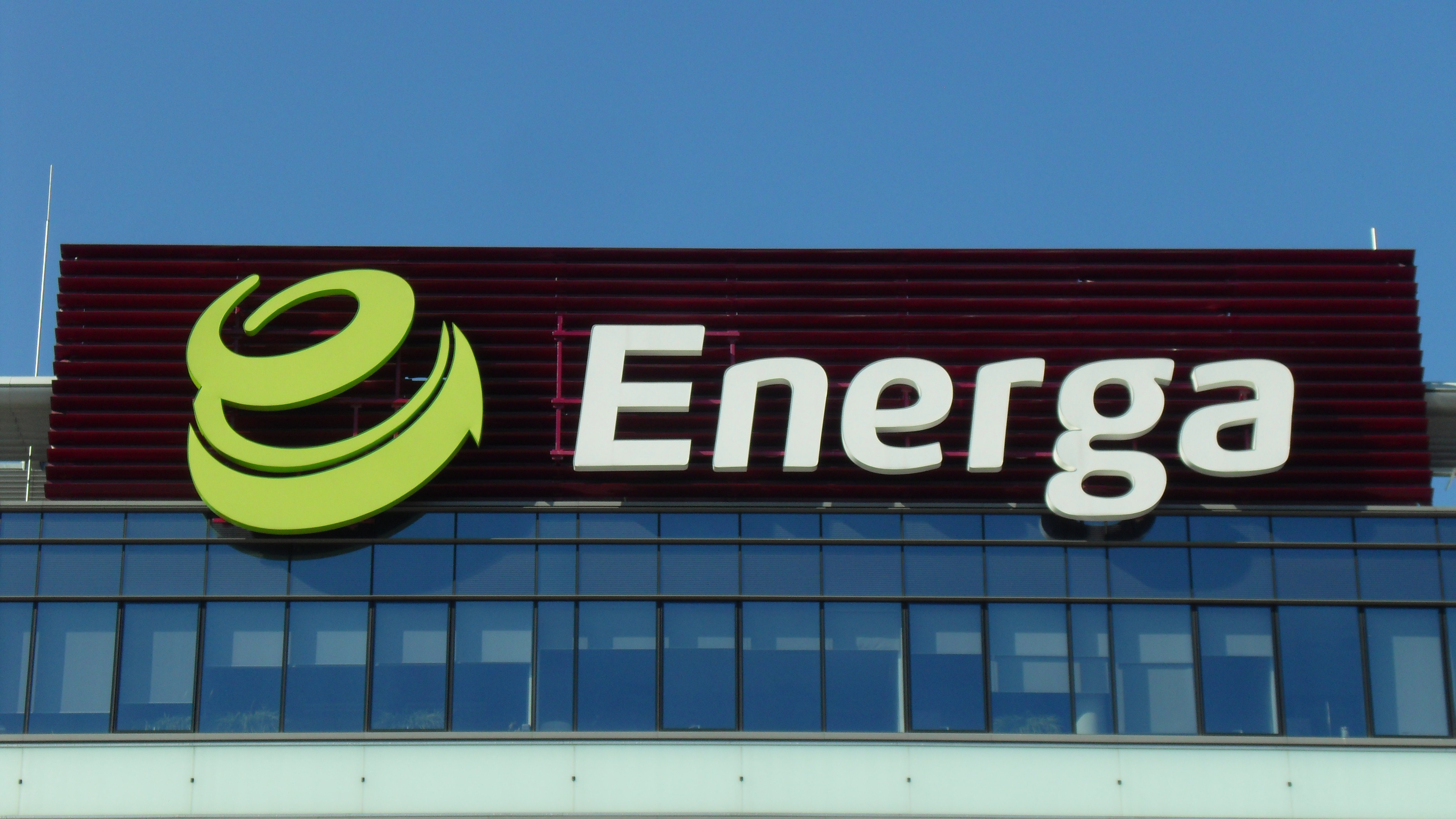
Oliwa business center, Gdańsk

Energa SA Subsidiary Groups

- Energa-Operator SA (Distribution of Electricity)
- Energa-Obrót SA (Trade on the domestic and wholesale electricity market, and sales of electricity to individual customers and businesses)
- Energa Elektrownie Ostrołęka SA (The largest producer of electricity and heat in northern Poland. The company is one of the pioneers in the Polish power industry in the development of bioenergy.
- Elektrownia Ostrołęka SA
- Energa Bio Sp. z. o. o. (Construction of a biogas plant)
- Energa Hydro Sp. z o.o. (Hydroelectricity)
- Energa Invest SA
- Energa Kogeneracja Sp. z o.o.
- Energa-lighting
- Energa Informatyka i Technologie Sp. z. o. o.
- Międzynarodowe Centrum Szkolenia Energetyki Sp. z. o. o.
- Energa Centrum Usług Wspólnych Sp. z. o.o.
- ZEP - MOT Sp. z. o.o.
- Kongres Sp. z. o.o.
- Elektrownia Wodna we Włocławku Sp. z. o. o. w likwidacji
- Energa Finance AB
- Elektrownia CCGT Gdańsk Sp. z. o. o. w organizacji
- Elektrownia CCGT Grudziądz Sp. z. o. o. w organizacji
- Breva Sp. z. o. o.
- Ekologiczne Materiały Grzewcze Sp. z. o. o.
- RGK Sp. z. o. o.

The Energa company has bases of operation in Gdańsk, Kalisz, Olsztyn, Płock, Koszalin and Toruń.

== Sport ==
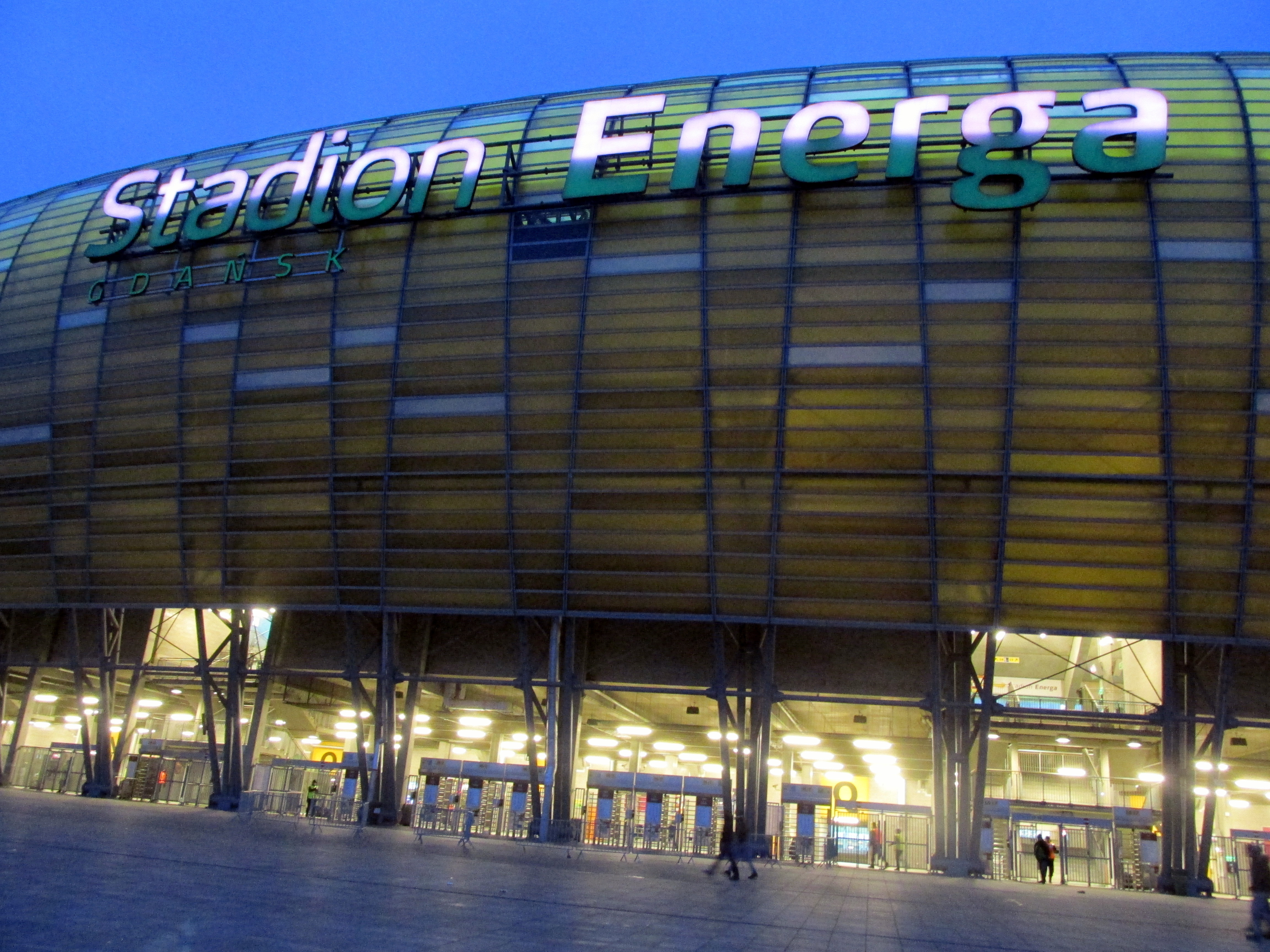
Stadion Energa Gdańsk - Energa had stadium naming rights from 2015 to 2020

Energa is involved in sponsorship with many sports teams in northern Poland.

- Lechia Gdańsk - Men's football team (main club sponsor since 2016. Also appeared on the Lechia shirts from 2007–10).
- Energa Gedania Gdańsk - Woman's volleyball team (team title sponsor since 2007).
- Energa MKS Kalisz - Men's handball team (team title sponsor since 2017).
- Energa Wybrzeże Gdańsk - Men's handball team (team title sponsor since 2018).
- Energa Toruń - Woman's basketball team
- Stoczniowiec Gdańsk - Men's ice hockey team

Energa have also been involved with sponsoring;

- Polska Liga Koszykówki - The top division of men's basketball in Poland.

Energa have been formally involved with sponsoring;

- AZS Koszalin - Women's handball team. Team title sponsor (team known as Energa AZS Koszalin) from 2013 until 2019.
- Stadion Energa Gdańsk - 43,000 capacity football stadium. Naming rights on the stadium from 2015 until 2020.
