= Warsaw Shore series 18 =

Warsaw Shore
- Season 18
- No. of episodes: 13

Release
- Original network: MTV; Player international
- Original release: 19 March – 25 June 2023

Series chronology
- ← Previous; Series 17 Next → Series 19

The eighteenth series of Warsaw Shore, a Polish television programme based in Warsaw, Poland was announced in January 2023 and began airing on 19 March 2023. The series was filmed in Radom, Warsaw and Łódź. This is also the first series not to include Jeremiasz "Jez" Szmigiel and Kamil Jagielski after their departures the previous season. It was also the first series to include four new cast members, Angelika Kramer, who had previously appeared on the fourth series of Love Island. Wyspa miłości, Eliasz Zdzitowiecki, Marcin Pastuszka and Piotr Nowakowski.

== Cast ==
- Alan Kwieciński (Episode 6–7, 9)
- Aleksandra "Ola" Okrzesik
- Angelika Kramer
- Damian "Dzik" Graf (Episode 10–12)
- Eliasz Zdzitowiecki
- Kasjusz "Don Kasjo" Życiński (Episode 10–12)
- Lena Majewska
- Marcin "Mały" Pastuszka
- Milena Łaszek
- Oliwia Dziatkiewicz (Episode 1–11)
- Patryk Spiker
- Piotr "Piotrek" Nowakowski
- Michał "Sarna" Sarnowski
- Przemysław "Sequento" Skulski
- Wiktoria "Jaszczur" Robert (Episode 1–9)

=== Duration of cast ===
Cast members	Series 18												
Cast members	1	2	3	4	5	6	7	8	9	10	11	12	13
Alan													
Aleksandra													
Angelika													
Damian													
Eliasz													
Kasjusz													
Lena													
Marcin													
Milena													
Oliwia													
Patryk													
Piotr													
Przemysław													
Sarna													
Wiktoria													

=== Notes ===
Key: = "Cast member" is featured in this episode.
Key: = "Cast member" arrives in the house.
Key: = "Cast member" voluntarily leaves the house.
Key: = "Cast member" returns to the house.
Key: = "Cast member" leaves the series.
Key: = "Cast member" returns to the series.
Key: = "Cast member" does not feature in this episode.

== Episodes ==
No. overall	No. in season	Title	Original release date	Viewers (millions)
216	1	"Episode 1"	19 March 2023	TBA
Celebrating their 18th season in Warsaw, the team arrives in style at a luxurious villa! We will meet new faces, and debutants will not miss the baptism.
217	2	"Episode 2"	26 March 2023	TBA
At the first party, kissing and arguing warm up the atmosphere even more. Humor leaves Sarna with the arrival of the Boss and the announcement of the punishments. In a Bodypainting activity, the bodies acquire color.
218	3	"Episode 3"	2 April 2023	TBA
Sarna bravely bears the punishment, and the team will go to Radom!. The group seized Spiker's body and several hearts. Piotr circulates between Ola and Angelika, and Eliasz becomes an easy target for the girls.
219	4	"Episode 4"	16 April 2023	TBA
Sarna manages to redeem himself with Angelika. Oliwia feels sorry. Compulsive buying! Lena is the greatest "gem" of the second hand. Enchanted by the illusions, the team also succumbs to the magic of a pink limousine.
220	5	"Episode 5"	23 April 2023	TBA
The night is filled with friendship and scenes of jealousy. Sarna deepens with the new acquaintance. Lena's mysterious relationship with her ex-boyfriend: doesn't old love rust?.
221	6	"Episode 6"	7 May 2023	TBA
It's house party time! And there are familiar faces in the crowd. Performances, dances and... proposals on stage! Ewelona enchants with her voice, Alan flirts with Angelika. Although jealousy in itself says a lot, the party is conducive to confessions.
222	7	"Episode 7"	14 May 2023	TBA
The house party is coming to an end, but it's still not enough for some. Oliwia's attention turns to a handsome friend. More fights! Drinks, sausages, cucumbers and helicopters fly in front of your eyes.
223	8	"Episode 8"	21 May 2023	TBA
Warmed up by a burlesque performance, the team spends a hot afternoon in the sauna. Sarna finds himself in the role of a father, with a child crawling under his care. It was relaxing, time to get fit!
224	9	"Episode 9"	28 May 2023	TBA
Wiktoria says goodbye to the team. Jealousy is in my head! Alan's presence annoys Piotrek and Ola distances himself from Eliasz. The little boy conquers the fan's heart, but the night ends in drama: Milena and Sequento leave the house.
225	10	"Episode 10"	4 June 2023	TBA
Dzik and Kasjusz are back in action! Milena and Sequento also return. Oliwia seduces Kasjusz and makes him jealous. Ángelika, the queen of dramas: her rejection and torn pants cause scandals. Eliasz follows Ola like a shadow.
226	11	"Episode 11"	11 June 2023	TBA
227	12	"Episode 12"	18 June 2023	TBA
It's going to be a tough ride!. After the adrenaline rush behind the wheel of a monster truck, the team goes to Ostrołęka to start a fat ballet. Eliasz tries his luck among the fans and Angelika, offended by Piotrek, looks for a handsome man.
228	13	"Episode 13"	25 June 2023	TBA
The tactics don't matter, it's the podium that counts! The last party is a real mix of lots of fun, lots of kissing and loud scandals. Jealousy reaches its limit, boys against Maly. The Śląska gang won't let the team sleep!.
