= Georg von Nostitz =

Georg Karl von Nostitz-Jänkendorf (1781–1838) was a German military officer in Imperial Russian service.

== Biography ==
A member of the Lusatian branch of an old noble House of Nostitz, Georg Karl was the son of Johann August Gottlob von Nostitz und Jänkendorf (b. 1730). He married Anastasia Ivanovna Morozova (1800–1885), the daughter of a Russian landowner Ivan Morozov, court counselor and regional noble landlord who co-founded the village and estate of Vasilievka on the Samara River. Together, they had two children: Count Ivan Goergievich Nostitz and Countess Olga Bezobrazova.

== Military career ==
=== Prussian Service ===
During the Napoleonic Wars he began his military career in the Prussian service. Before the War of the Fourth Coalition, he became an adjutant to the Prussian Prince Louis Ferdinand, who died on October 10, 1806.

=== Russian Service ===
in 1807 he joined the Russian Army and in a couple of years rose to the rank of major of the Russian–German Legion. For his service he received the Order of St. George (4th class) and was allowed to stay in the Russian army after the war had ended. Rising through the ranks, during the November Uprising he served as a Lieutenant-General and commanding officer of the 1st Light Horse Brigade of the Guards Cavalry Division. Distinguished during the Battle of Warsaw (1831), he received Order of St. George 3rd Class.

As a result of his distinguished service to the Russian Empire, his legitimate descendants were elevated to the hereditary title of Count by an imperial decree in 1849.
