= Henryk Ignacy Kamieński =

Polish brigadier general

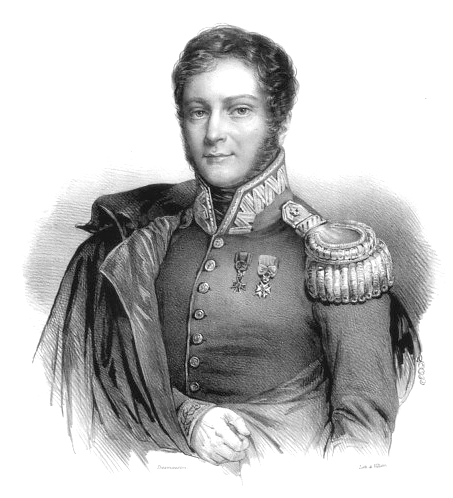
Henryk Ignacy Kamieński

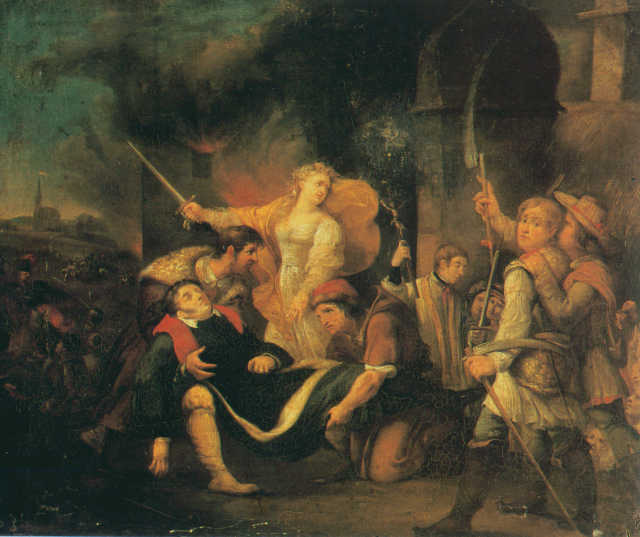
Death of Kamieński

Henryk Ignacy Kamieński (31 July 1777 in Hruszwica – 26 May 1831 at Ostrołęka) was a Polish brigadier general. He fought on the French side in the Napoleonic Wars and then on the Polish side in the November Uprising.

== Life ==
After graduating from French military academies, in 1806 he became a captain of grenadiers and adjutant to Marshal Nicolas Oudinot. For his participation in the 1806–07 campaign he received the Virtuti Militari order and the Légion d'honneur. On 30 January 1808 he became captain of the 1st Infantry Regiment of the Duchy of Warsaw. He was then appointed one of the four squadron commanders of the Polish 1st Light Cavalry Regiment of the Imperial Guard and deployed with that unit from Germany to Madrid. He fought in the anti-guerrilla force commanded by Jean-Baptiste Bessières, including at Somosierra, and escorted Napoleon on his return from Spain to France.

After his unit divided, Kamieński went to a regiment commanded by Colonel Vincent Krasinski but after a duel with his commanding officer he resigned on 1 August 1809 and joined the Vistula Legion instead. On 27 December 1811 he took command of the 10th Infantry Regiment, becoming a colonel. In 1812 his regiment took part in the personal review by the emperor himself in Königsberg and he then joined 7th Division of the 10th Corps of the Grande Armée under Jacques MacDonald, being assigned to general Rappa's corps. After winning a series of clashes with Russian troops, he retired to Gdańsk where he led numerous assaults, defensive actions and nighttime sallies beyond the town walls. From these he received the Officer's Cross of the Legion of Honour.

He resigned on 26 December 1815 and settled in Ruda. He took part in the November Uprising despite ill health, including time commanding 5th Infantry Division. He was killed at Ostrołęka when a cannonball broke both his legs while he was leading the last Polish counterattack against the Russian beachhead. His grave is currently on a private estate on the outskirts of Ostrołęka.
