= St. Anthony's Church, Ostrołęka =

Church building in Ostrołęka, Poland

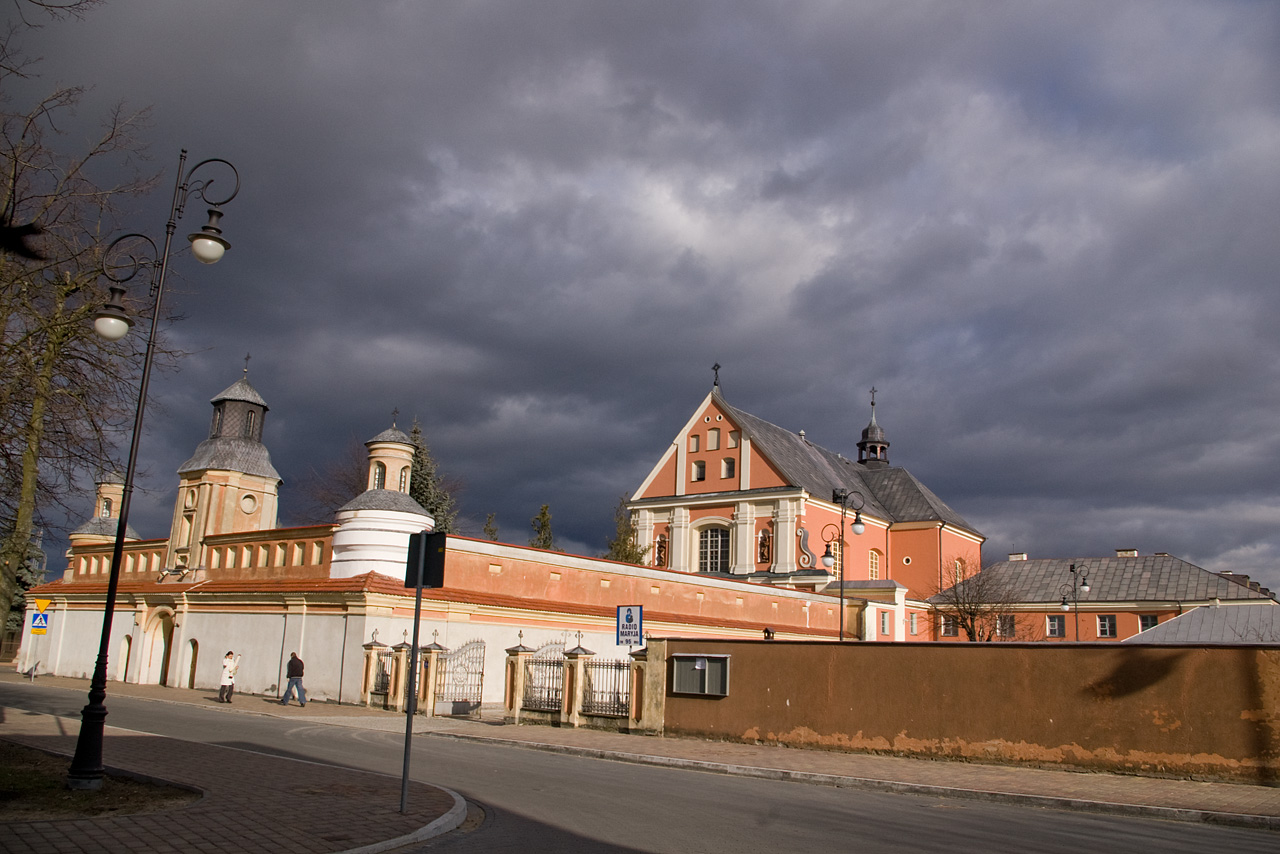
Modern view of the former convent

St. Anthony of Padua Church (Polish: kościół pw. św. Antoniego Padewskiego) is a Roman Catholic parish church located in Ostrołęka, Poland. Built between 1666 and 1696 the church is part of a former Bernardine monastery complex. It is one of the oldest and most valuable historical monuments in Ostrołęka.

== History ==
The initiator and benefactor of the construction of the monastery and church was Tomasz Gocłowski, judge of the Nur land, who announced his intention to found the complex at the Bernardine convent in Przasnysz on January 14, 1664. The motivation for the foundation was a desire to gain prestige, as well as to prevent the possible spread of Protestantism from neighboring Prussia. In 1665, Bishop Jan Gembicki of Płock and King Jan Kazimierz, whose consent was necessary due to royal status of the city of Ostrołęka, approved the foundation of the monastery. The monastery was established outside the city itself, in the Łomża Suburb, initially as a wooden structure. The introduction of monks to their new residence took place on June 13, 1666, on the feast day of Saint Anthony of Padua. In 1668, the congregation was elevated to the rank of a convent, with Father Jerzy Lipski as the guardian in charge.

During the November Uprising it was one of crucial points of Polish defence during the battle of Ostrołęka in 1831. Secularised in the aftermath of the January Uprising in 1864, it was taken over by the tsarist authorities of partitioned Poland and a school was moved to the former convent. It was returned to a local Catholic parish in 1927. In 1989, the building was heavily damaged by fire, but it was since restored.

== Bibliography ==
- Kalinowska, Barbara (2005). "Bernardyni w Ostrołęce. Proces fundacyjny" (PDF). Zeszyty Naukowe Ostrołęckiego Towarzystwa Naukowego. 19.
