= 11th Fanagoriysky Grenadier Regiment =

Russian military unit

Generalissimo Prince Suvorov's 11th Grenadier Fanagoriysky, currently His Imperial Highness Grand Duke Dimitri Pavlovich's Regiment
- 11-й Гренадерский Фанагорийский Генералиссимуса Князя Суворова, ныне Его Императорского Высочества Великого Князя Димитрия Павловича полк
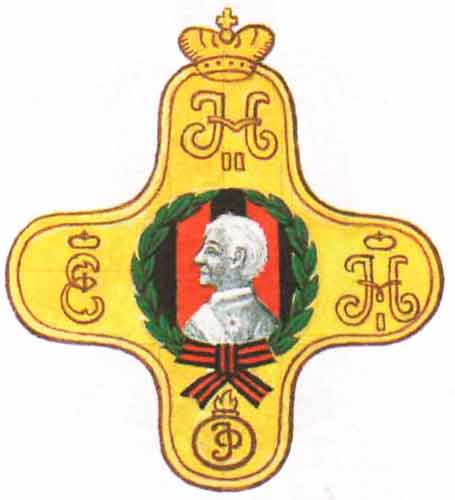
- Regimental badge
- Active: 25 May 1790 – 1918
- Country: Russia
- Allegiance: 3rd Grenadier Division
- Type: Infantry
- Patron: Alexander Suvorov-Rymniksky; Dmitri Pavlovich
- Anniversaries: Regimental holiday – 30 August
- Engagements: § Military engagements
- Battle honours: Ribbon of Saint George

The 11th Fanagoriysky (Note: 'Phanagorian') Grenadier Regiment was an infantry unit of the Russian Imperial Army.

- Precedence — May 25, 1790.
- Regimental holiday — August 30.
- Headquarters — Moscow.

Фанагория, Fanagoriya, 'Phanagoria', – whence the regiment's name (Fanagoriysky) – is an island and town at mouth of the Kuban River.

In 1790 the Russian Empire, in alliance with Austria, was fighting the Russo-Turkish War (1787–1792) against the Ottoman Empire. Russia's troops were near the Danube River and in the Caucasus. The commander-in-chief was Prince Potemkin, and Suvorov stood with his detached corps in Birlad (Bârlad in present-day Romania) near the Austrians. Suvorov's command included, among other troops, detached grenadier battalions which had taken part in September 1789 in the Battle of Rymnik, the great victory of Suvorov and of the Austrian General Coburg over Cenaze Hasan Pasha on the river Rymnik, where Russo-Austrian forces defeated enemy troops four times their own strength, and for which Suvorov received the dignity of a Count (Russian: Граф, romanized: Graf) and the victory title Rymniksky. — Here from these battalions Suvorov himself formed his personal, 11th Fanagoriysky Grenadier Regiment.

The Russian Empress Catherine II (r. 1762–1796) at the beginning of her reign, among other transformations, had ordered some grenadier battalions to form a regiment called the 4th Grenadier Regiment; then in 1785 the 4th Grenadier Regiment was ordered to be called the Fanagoriysky, and on 2 April 1790 (N.S. 13 Apr.) Potemkin ordered Suvorov to form and command a Fanagoriysky Regiment. This name and the appointment of Suvorov as the regiment's chief was due to the fact that from 1777 to 1779 Suvorov had commanded a detachment on the Kuban River,—by force and negotiation he had conquered many tribes in the Phanagorian region and joined their lands to Russia.

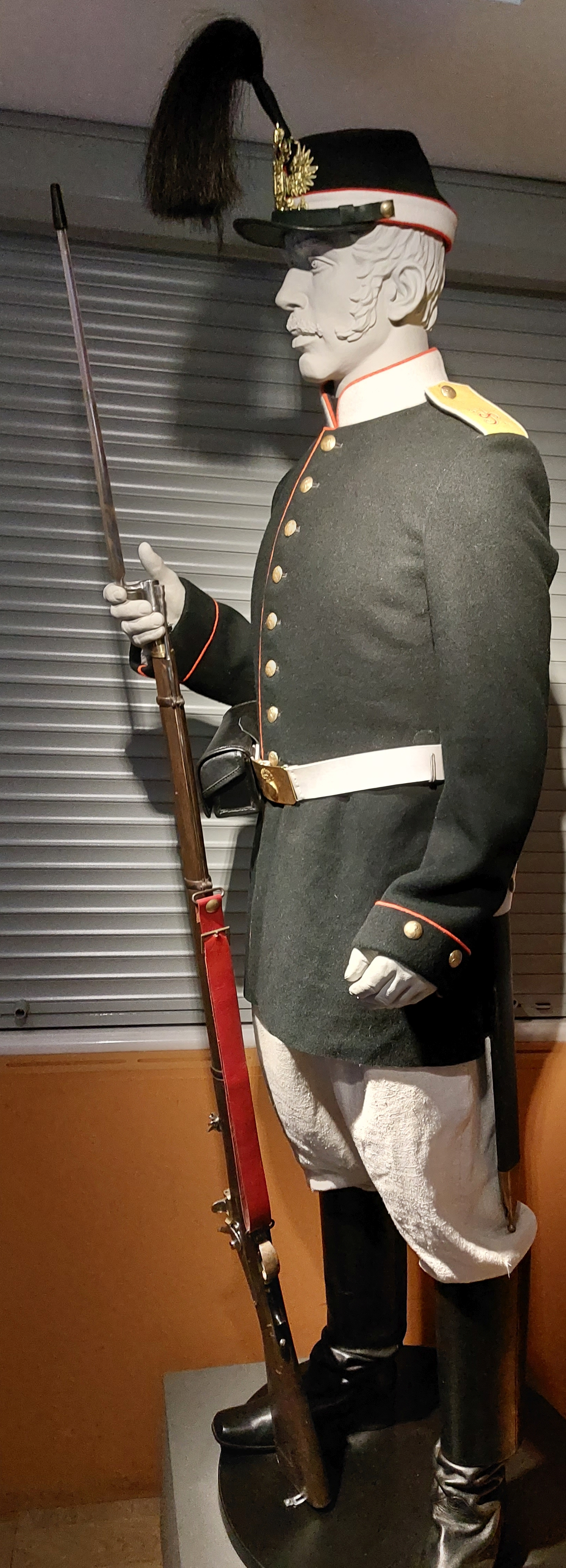
Private of the 11th Fanagoriysky Grenadier Regiment, 1877–1878

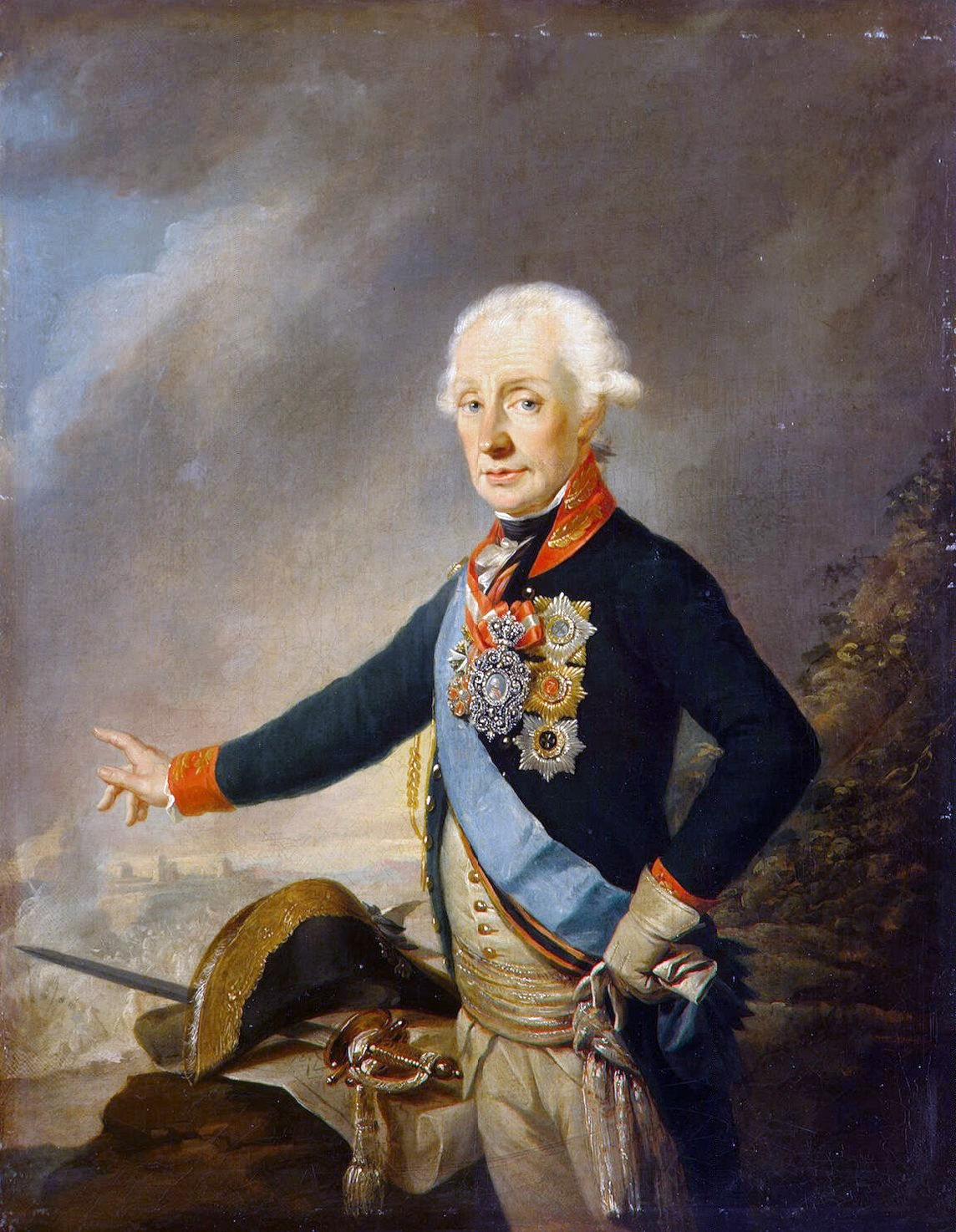
Alexander Suvorov-Rymniksky, portrait by Joseph Kreutzinger (1799)

== Military engagements ==
- Russo-Turkish War (1787–1792)
  - Siege of Izmail (1790)
- Kościuszko Uprising (1794)
  - Battle of Praga
- Dutch expedition (1799)
- War of the Third Coalition (1805–1806)
  - Battle of Austerlitz (1805)
- Russo-Turkish War (1806–1812)
  - Battle of Bazargic (1810) – Ribbons of St. George
- Patriotic War of 1812
  - Battle of Borodino
- War of the Sixth Coalition (1813–1814)
  - Battle of Lützen (1813)
  - Battle of Leipzig (1813)
  - Storming of Paris (1814)
- Polish–Russian War 1830–1831
  - Battle of Ostrołęka (1831)
  - Battle and Storming of Warsaw (1831)
- Russo-Turkish War (1877–1878)
  - Siege of Plevna (1877) – Silver trumpets of Saint George
- First World War (1914–1918)
  - Great Retreat (1915)

== Notes and references ==
=== Sources ===
- Shavrov, Kassiyan; Fyodorov, Semyon (1890). Краткая история 11-го Гренадерского Фанагорийского Генералиссимуса князя Суворова полка [A Brief History of the Generalissimo Prince Suvorov's 11th Grenadier Fanagoriysky Regiment] (in Russian). Moscow: Типография Т. И. Гаген.
