= Ostrołęka Power Station =

Power plant in Ostroleka, Poland

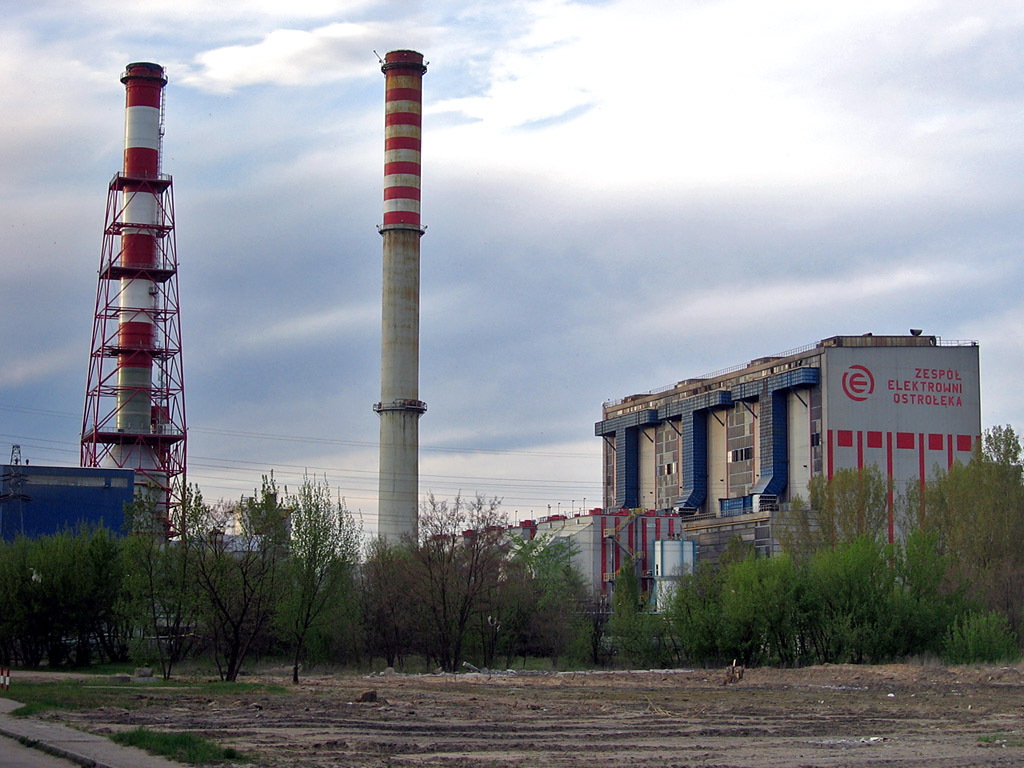
- Official name: Elektrownia Ostrołęka
- Country: Poland
- Location: Ostrołęka
- Coordinates: 53°6′13″N 21°36′45″E
- Status: Operational
- Commission date: 1956
- Owner: Energa SA
- Operator: Energa Elektrownie Ostrołęka SA

Thermal power station
- Primary fuel: Hard coal
- Secondary fuel: Biomass
- Cogeneration?: Yes

Power generation
- Units operational: 4
- Nameplate capacity: 740 MW

External links
- Website: www.energaostroleka.pl
- Commons: Related media on Commons

The Ostrołęka Power Station (Polish: Elektrownia Ostrołęka) is a coal-fired thermal power station in Ostrołęka, Poland. It is owned by Energa SA.

The power station consists of two parts. The Ostrołęka A combined heat and power plant with installed capacity of 93 MW electricity and 456 MW heat was built in 1956. The Ostrołęka B power station was built in 1972. It consists of three units with combined installed capacity of 647 MW.

There were plans to build an additional unit of 1,000 MW capacity called Ostrołęka C by 2015, with coal supplied by the Bogdanka Coal Mine. The project struggled with financing and delays, and low electricity and natural gas prices made it seem ever more uneconomical. Early 2020, the special purpose vehicle created for the project, Elektrownia Ostrołęka, announced a 90-days hiatus on the building activity to research the possibility to switch the fuel source to natural gas. In May 2020 the indefinite suspension of the partly constructed project was announced, with participating partners writing down PLN1 billion (around $250 million) of investments on the now stranded asset.

== History ==
- 1917 - Electrification of the city of Ostrołęka in connection with the development of the sawmill industry
- 1928 - Completion of the diesel power plant at Mazowiecka street
- 1929 - Extension of the power plant - 300 hp engine and 250 kW generator
- 1930-1933 - Construction of a small hydro power plant on the Omulew River in Grabów
- 1953 - The start of the construction of a heat and power plant planned for the operation of the pulp and paper industry
- 21 July 1956 - The first OP-100 boiler and a 14 MW turbine set were put into operation
- 1956-1958 - Extension of the heat and power plant with further boilers and turbine sets
- 1967 - Extension of the heat and power plant with the OPP-230 boiler and the 34.1 MW turbine set
- 1968 - The start of the construction of a thermal power station with a target capacity of 600 MW
- 1 January 1972 - Power plants were merged into Elektrownia Ostrołęka Complex
- 20 December 1972 - Opening of Ostrołęka B power plant
- 1 January 1989 - Creation of state enterprise - Zespół Elektrowni Ostrołęka
- 1997 - A biomass-fired fluidized bed combustor (bark and wood chips) converted from an OP-100 coal boiler started its work
- 31 August 1998 - Zespół Elektrowni Ostrołęka S.A. were registered
- 2000-2003 - Modernization of units 1 and 3 in the Ostrołęka B power plant
- 2007 - Commissioning of a new chimney with a flue gas desulfurization system.
- 10 December 2008 - The name changed

The name Zespół Elektrowni Ostrołęka SA was replaced by the new name: ENERGA Elektrownie Ostrołęka Spółka Akcyjna.

== See also ==
- List of power stations in Poland
