= Karol Turno =

Polish general

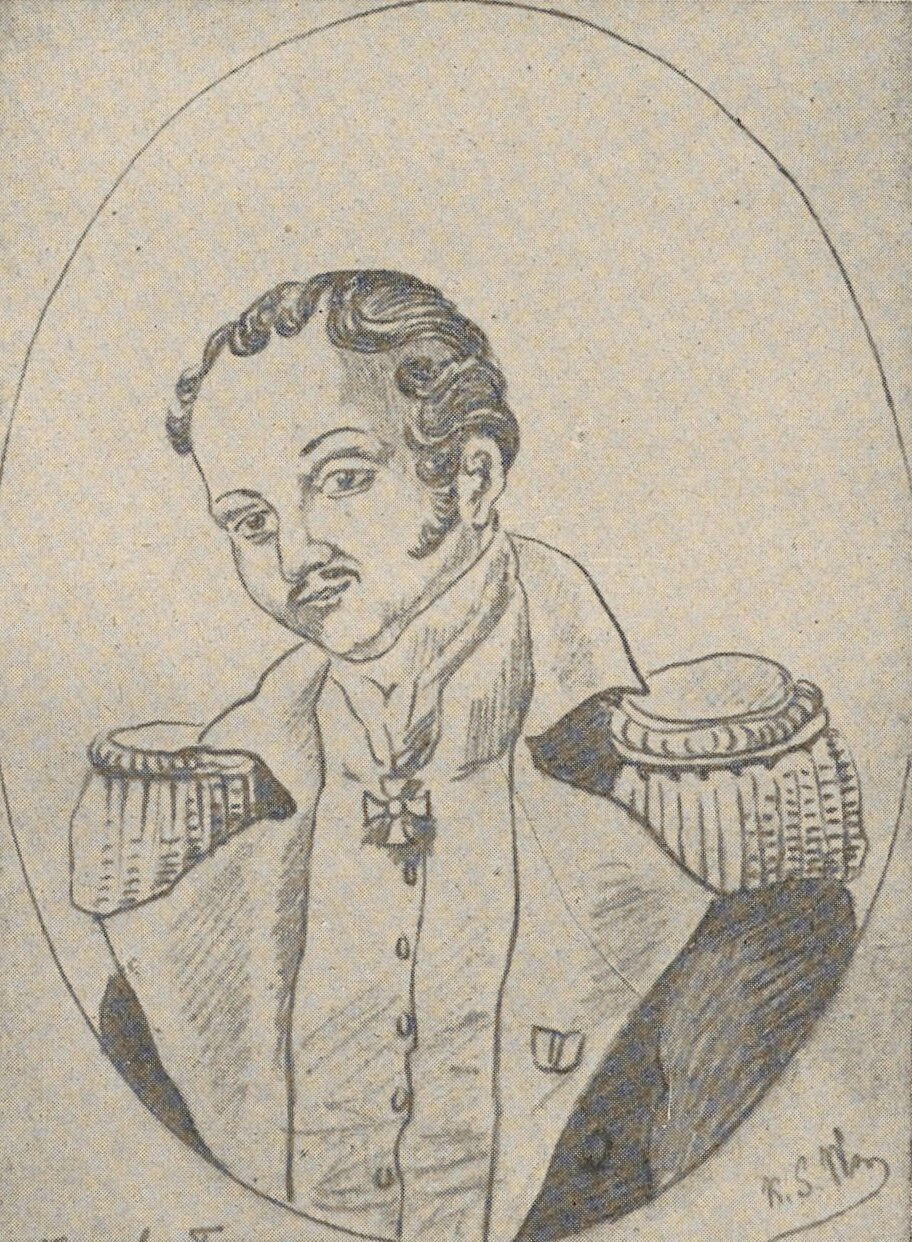
Drawing of Karol Turno

Karol Turno (1788–1860) was a Polish military officer and a Brigadier General of the Army of Congress Poland. Born 7 May 1788 in Warkowicze in Volhynia, he joined the Imperial and Royal Austrian Army in 1807. However, in 1809 he switched sides and joined the army of Duchy of Warsaw to take part in the short Polish–Austrian War as an adjutant to his uncle, General Kazimierz Turno. Promoted to the rank of captain in 1811, he took part in all campaigns of the Napoleonic Wars between 1812 and 1814.

After the war he returned to Warsaw, was promoted to colonel and became a cavalry instructor and an adjutant to Grand Duke Constantine Pavlovich of Russia. Following the outbreak of the November Uprising he personally escorted the Grand Duke to the Russian border, and then returned to Warsaw to join the ranks of the Polish Army. A chief of staff of the Polish cavalry forces, in May 1831 he was promoted to the rank of brigadier general and became the commanding officer of the Cavalry Brigade, and then the Cavalry Division.

After the Battle of Warsaw he remained in the city, was arrested by the Russians and sentenced to forcible resettlement to Perm. Pardoned in 1833, he returned to Russian-held Poland and bought a small manor near Grodno. Later in his life he moved to the manor of Objezierze near Poznań, where he died 10 March 1860.
