= Samara River =

Samara River may refer to:

== Geography ==
- Samara (Dnieper), a tributary in Ukraine
- Samara (Volga), a tributary in Russia
- Samara, an ancient name for Somme river in France

== See also ==
- Samara (disambiguation)
