= Jacek Kościelniak =

Polish politician (born 1963)

member of Sejm 2005-2007
- In office 25 September 2005 – ?

Personal details
- Born: 9 October 1963 (age 62)
- Party: Law and Justice

Jacek Zygmunt Kościelniak (born 9 October 1963 in Dąbrowa Górnicza) is a Polish politician. He was elected to the Sejm on 25 September 2005, getting 3,765 votes in 32 Sosnowiec district as a candidate from the Law and Justice list.

== See also ==
- Members of Polish Sejm 2005-2007
