= Ostrołęka =

- City county
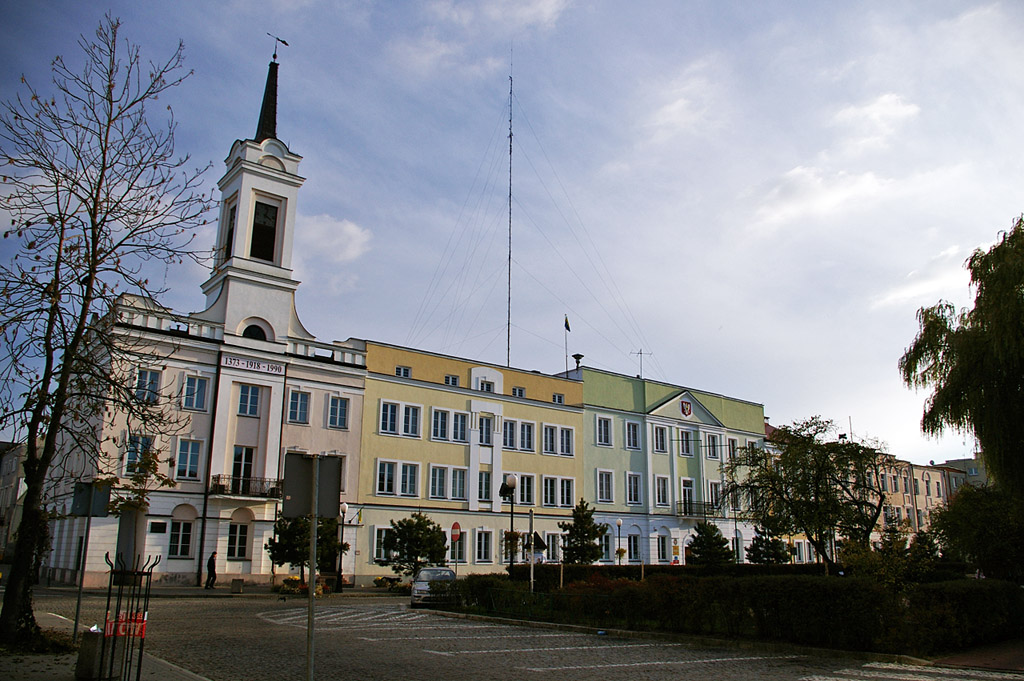
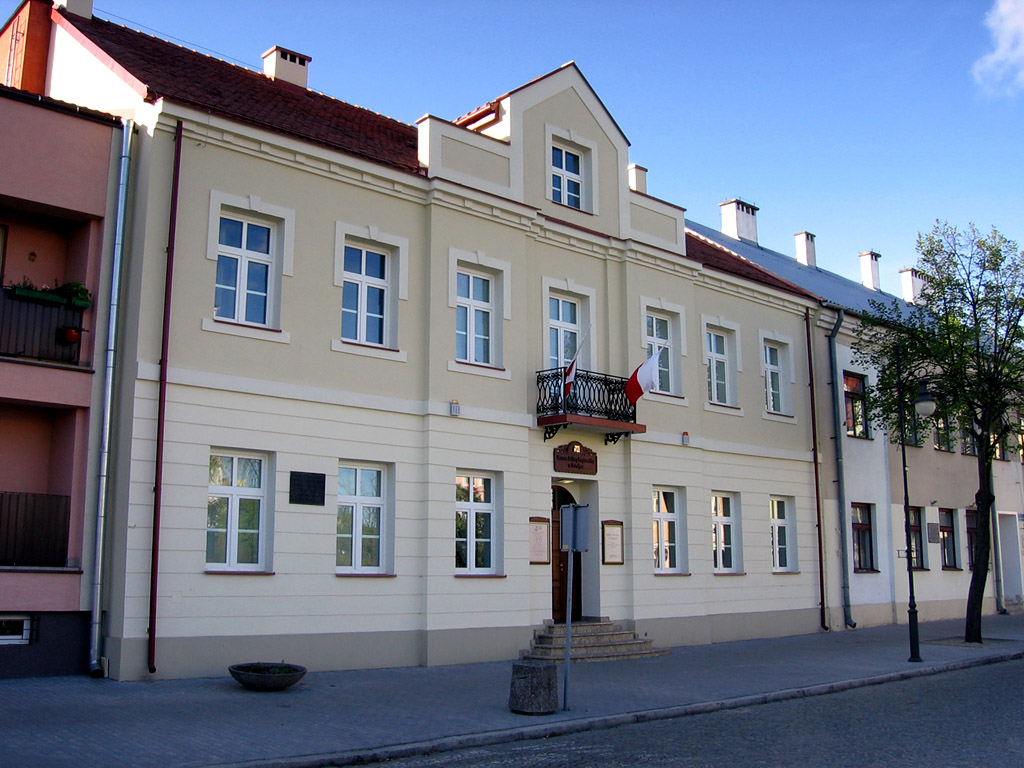
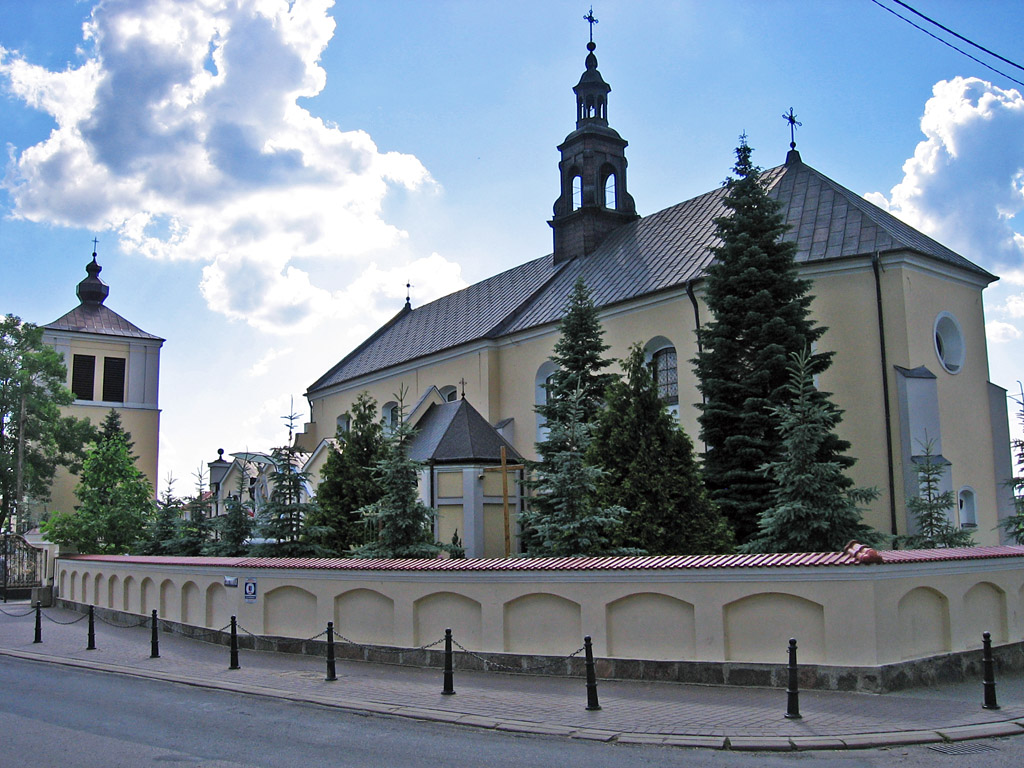
- Józef Bem Square (Polish: Plac Bema) and the town hall City Museum Visitation Church

- Flag Coat of arms

- Location within Poland
- Coordinates: 53°4′N 21°34′E
- Country: Poland
- Voivodeship: Masovian
- County: city county
- Established: 11th century
- Town rights: 1373

Government
  - Mayor: Paweł Niewiadomski

Area
  - Total: 33.46 km^{2} (12.92 sq mi)
- Elevation: 92 m (302 ft)

Population (31 December 2021)
  - Total: 51,012 ▼
  - Density: 1,525/km^{2} (3,949/sq mi)
- Time zone: UTC+1 (CET)
  - Summer (DST): UTC+2 (CEST)
- Postal code: 07-400 to 07-417
- Area code: +48 029
- Vehicle registration: WO
- Website: http://www.ostroleka.pl

Ostrołęka (Polish: [ɔstrɔˈwɛŋka]) (Note: Yiddish: אסטראלענקע, romanized: Ostrolenka) is a city in northeastern Poland on the Narew river, about 120 km (75 mi) northeast of Warsaw, with a population of 51,012 (2021) and an area of 33.46 square kilometres (12.92 sq mi). It is the capital of both Ostrołęka County and Ostrołęka City County in the Masovian Voivodeship.

Ostrołęka was founded as a medieval stronghold that grew into an important royal city in northern Mazovia, which prospered from crafts and trade. The city was the site of several battles and skirmishes throughout history. Ostrołęka is a local railroad junction with four lines stemming from Ostrołęka railway station: eastwards to Łapy and Białystok, southwestwards to Tłuszcz and Warsaw, northwards to Wielbark and Olsztyn, and southwards to Małkinia Górna. Ostrołęka is a local centre of culture and light industry. The Ostrołęka Power Station is located in Ostrołęka.

== History ==
=== Founding ===
The territory became part of the emerging Polish state under its first historic ruler Mieszko I in the 10th century, and following the 12th-century fragmentation of the realm, it was part of the provincial Polish Duchy of Masovia.

The city's name refers to a sand-mud plain located on the left side of the Narew River which regularly flooded in the springtime throughout the centuries. A small fort was built on an island in the 11th or 12th century, currently located just one kilometer west of the modern city center. The fort was one of few sparsely built fortifications along the Narew River at the time. A village developed surrounding the fort over time, and is associated today as the initial settlement of Ostrołęka. Despite the lack of an exact date for Ostrołęka's founding, it was first mentioned as a town in the Province Act of 1373 by Duke Siemowit III of Masovia, and therefore, the year 1373 has become the most commonly associated date of the acquisition of town rights.

=== The 15th and 16th centuries ===
By the beginning of the 15th Century, Ostrołęka grew into an important economic center in the Duchy of Masovia for trade with the neighboring Teutonic Order. Wood, amber, and honey were the most commonly traded items. In 1526, the Duchy was incorporated directly into the Polish Kingdom. This resulted in an economic boom, most commonly associated to today as Ostrołęka's Golden Age. At this time, Queen Bona Sforza founded a folwark in Pomian – a neighboring settlement at the time, which currently finds itself situated well within the modern city's borders. The Golden Age lasted for approximately 40 years, whose conclusion is marked by three major catastrophes which struck in 1564 and 1571. In 1564, an epidemic seriously depopulated the town and surrounding regions. The same year, a fire tore through the town burning most of it down to the ground. In 1571, before the town had time to recuperate from the two previous catastrophes, another epidemic struck, further depopulating the region, officially marking the end of the town's Golden Age. Within 20 years, however, the town was rebuilt, including with the construction of Ostrołęka's first school. By the late 1590s, the town became the center of a big administrative district, approximately 1,980.5 km^{2} (764.7 sq mi) in size. It was a Polish royal city, administratively located in the Masovian Voivodeship in the Greater Poland Province.

=== The 17th and 18th centuries ===
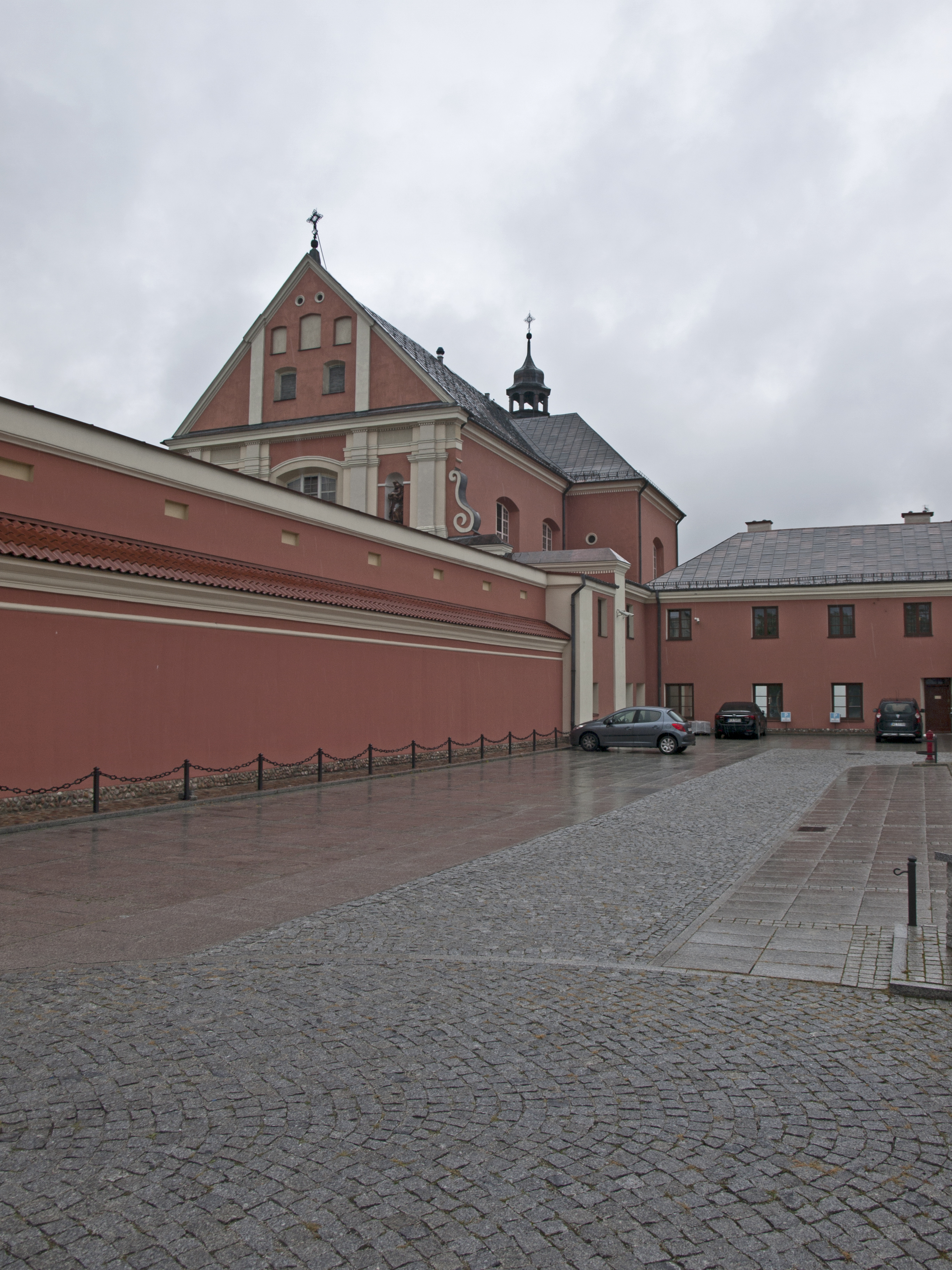
Baroque Bernardine monastery and St. Anthony's Church

Despite quickly recuperating in the early 17th century, the city passed through a period of impoverishment and stagnation in the middle and late 17th century. On 25 July 1656, in the midst of the Deluge, the town was laid waste by Swedish forces after having resisted them. In 1665, Bernardine monks settled in the town after a monastery was founded by Tomasz Gocłowski. The Bernardine monastery of St. Anthony of Padua was built in a late-Baroque style.

Despite being inhabited by only 400 people in 1676, the town was still considered to be the most populous of towns in the Łomża region. In the following century, the town was destroyed numerous times by Swedish, Russian, and Saxon armies. As a result, further economic development was hindered and the town remained in a state of stagnation for several decades. In the second half of the 18th century the city's economy revived and local merchants renewed trade with the major cities of Gdańsk, Warsaw and Königsberg.

During the Kościuszko Uprising, the First Wielkopolska National Cavalry Brigade was stationed in Ostrołęka. With the aim of aiding the Kościuszko Uprising, the First Brigade, led by Antoni Madaliński, started to march towards Kraków on 12 March 1794. Prussian troops reacted quickly by heading as far south as the Narew River, and reached the town's northern outskirts on the right bank of the Narew River, yet had never marched directly into, nor fully occupied, the town. The Uprising had failed and as a consequence of the Third Partition of Poland two years later, Ostrołęka found itself within Prussia's borders for ten years. At the turn of the century, the first German and Jewish families began to settle in the town and surrounding areas.

=== The Warsaw Duchy ===
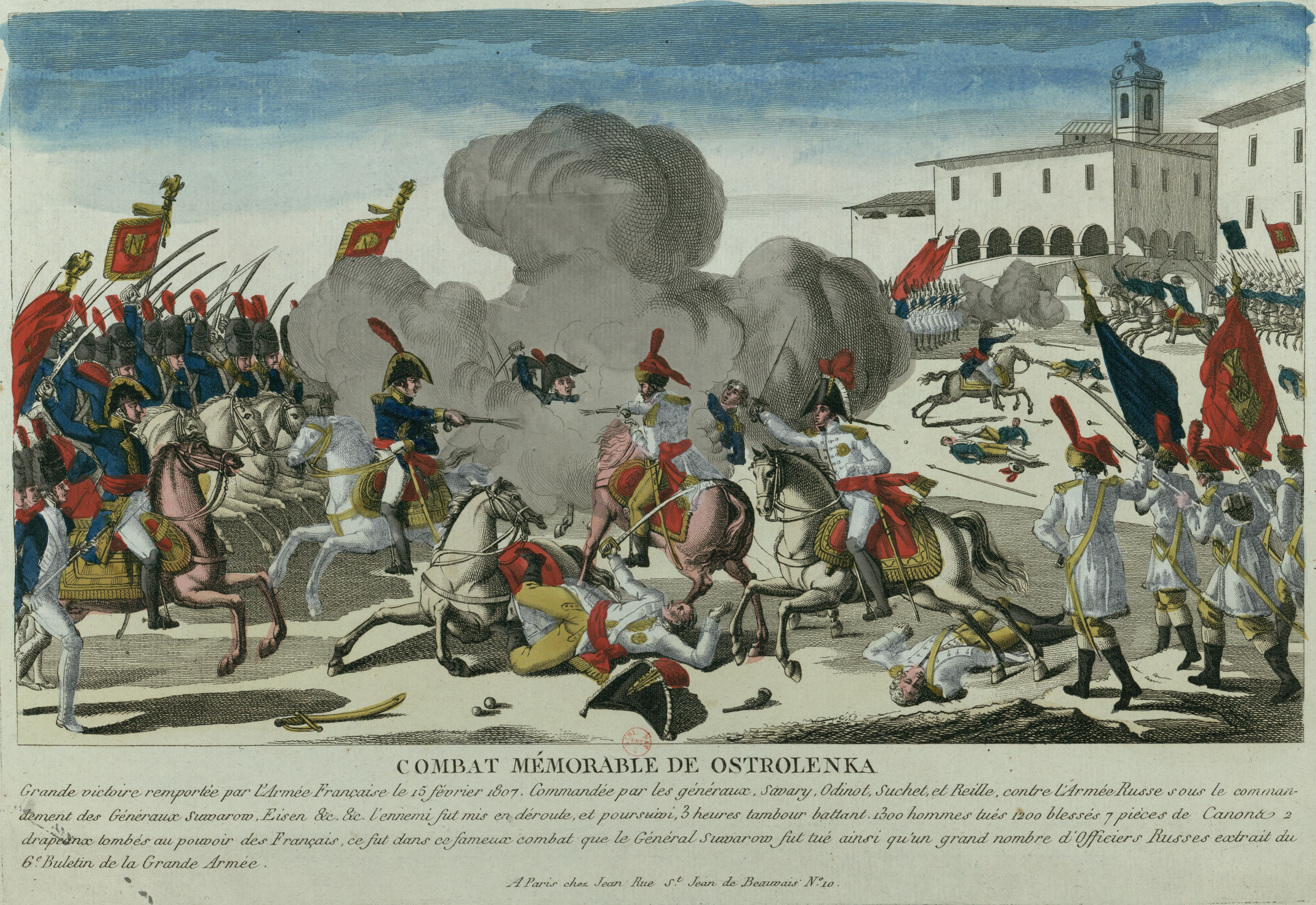
Battle of Ostrołęka (1807)

From the end of 1806 through June 1807, Ostrołęka was occupied by French troops. On 16 February 1807 occurred the Battle of Ostrołęka (1807). Taking place on the banks of the Narew outside of Ostrołęka where the French, under the General Anne Jean Marie René Savary, prevailed. Due to this success of the French Army, Ostrołęka appears on the Arc de Triomphe in Paris. In May 1807 the first map of Ostrołęka was made (now located in Bibliothéque du Génie in Paris). From 1807 to 1815 the city was part of the short-lived Polish Duchy of Warsaw.

=== Congress Poland ===
As part of a comprehensive plan of industrializing Poland, an extensive settlement for linen and cotton craftsmen was built on the right bank of Narew in 1826. The number of craftsmen increased and workers were trained in new crafts. The town also built two bridges, one permanent. The new route connecting Warsaw and St. Petersburg ran through Ostrołęka. Although the town's citizens were eager and proud to take part in the November Uprising of 1830-1831, they worried that their city, as in every previous war, would be destroyed. However they did not expect that the heaviest fighting would take place on near Ostrołęka.

Rebel plans envisaged the Polish Army attacking the Russian Infantry Corps of the Tsar's Guard, which made camp between Augustów and Ostrołęka. On 18 May 1831 General Henryk Dembiński claimed Ostrołęka. But General Jan Zygmunt Skrzynecki didn't make a use of his temporary superiority and he couldn't make up his mind whether to attack the Russians situated near Łomża. As a result, Łomża was destroyed.

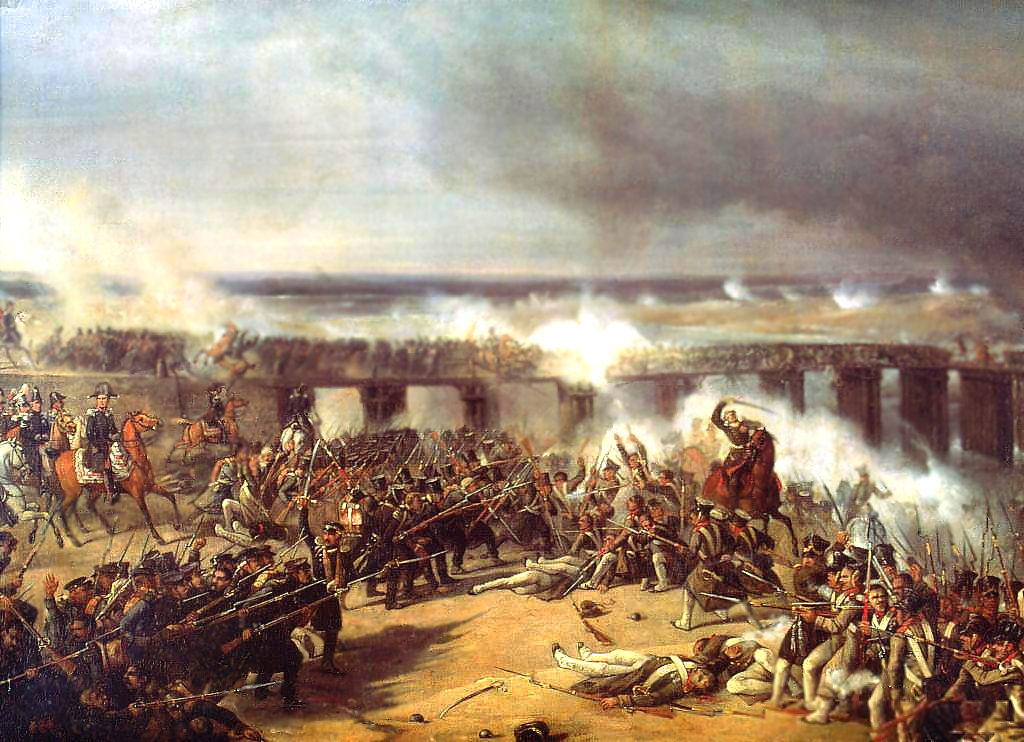
Battle of Ostrołęka (1831)

On 26 May 1831 the Battle of Ostrołęka (1831) took place. As a cannonade was heard, Jan Zygmunt Skrzynecki couldn't believe that Hans Karl von Diebitsch (a Russian general) had already reached the suburbs of the city. He ordered the Fourth Infantry Regiment to defend the city. The main defending forces fortified themselves in the Bernardine Monastery. Unfortunately the Russians had brought cannons with them; they quickly overpowered the Polish units and forced their surrender.

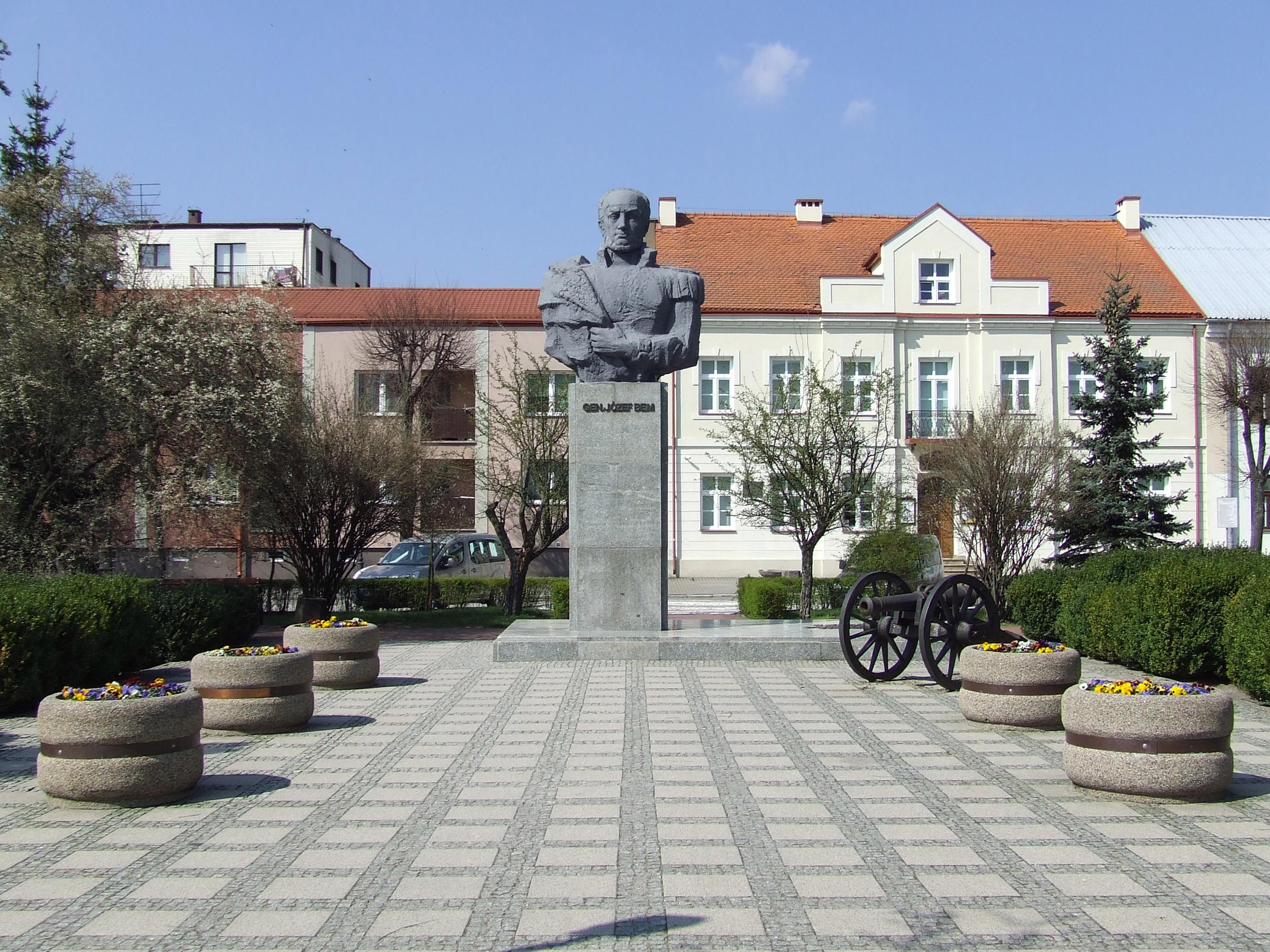
Monument of General Józef Bem, national hero of Poland

Von Diebitsch took over the city center, but the battle continued on the right side of the Narew. Skrzynecki and his troops valiantly defended the bridge, wanting to hold back the Russian forces from crossing over to the other side of the river. Lieutenant-Colonel Józef Bem and his Fourth Battery were called in to help defend the bridge. Bem was able to hold back the Russians, but the battle is often referred to as a Polish defeat. The defeat marked the end of the Uprising. As a result of the battle, 6000 Polish soldiers died including many Kurpie. Bem, for his bravery, was nominated as Commander-in-Chief of Artillery and was honoured with a Virtuti Militari Cross. The battle was the greatest and the bloodiest in the November Uprising.

=== 1831–1918 ===
After the Polish-Russian War, Ostrołęka became one of the most destroyed cities. Although it suffered great losses, Ostrołęka stayed a district city of Płock's Province. Ostrołęka's economy greatly declined. Nearly all the city's craftsmen became bankrupt. Only products of Ostrołęka's amber works were still supplied all over Europe. Ostrołęka got refunds from the Tsar's Treasury. However, it took a long time before it rose from its downfall. In 1847 a monument commemorating Russian Army's victory in the battle of Ostrołęka was raised on 26 May 1831. At the time of January's insurrection, no battles took place nearby Ostrołęka, as the Tsar placed a quite large Russian detachment in the city worrying of another Kurp Uprising. In 1864, after the Russian government's order, the Benedictines left Ostrołęka and the monastery buildings were placed under the parish-priest authority.

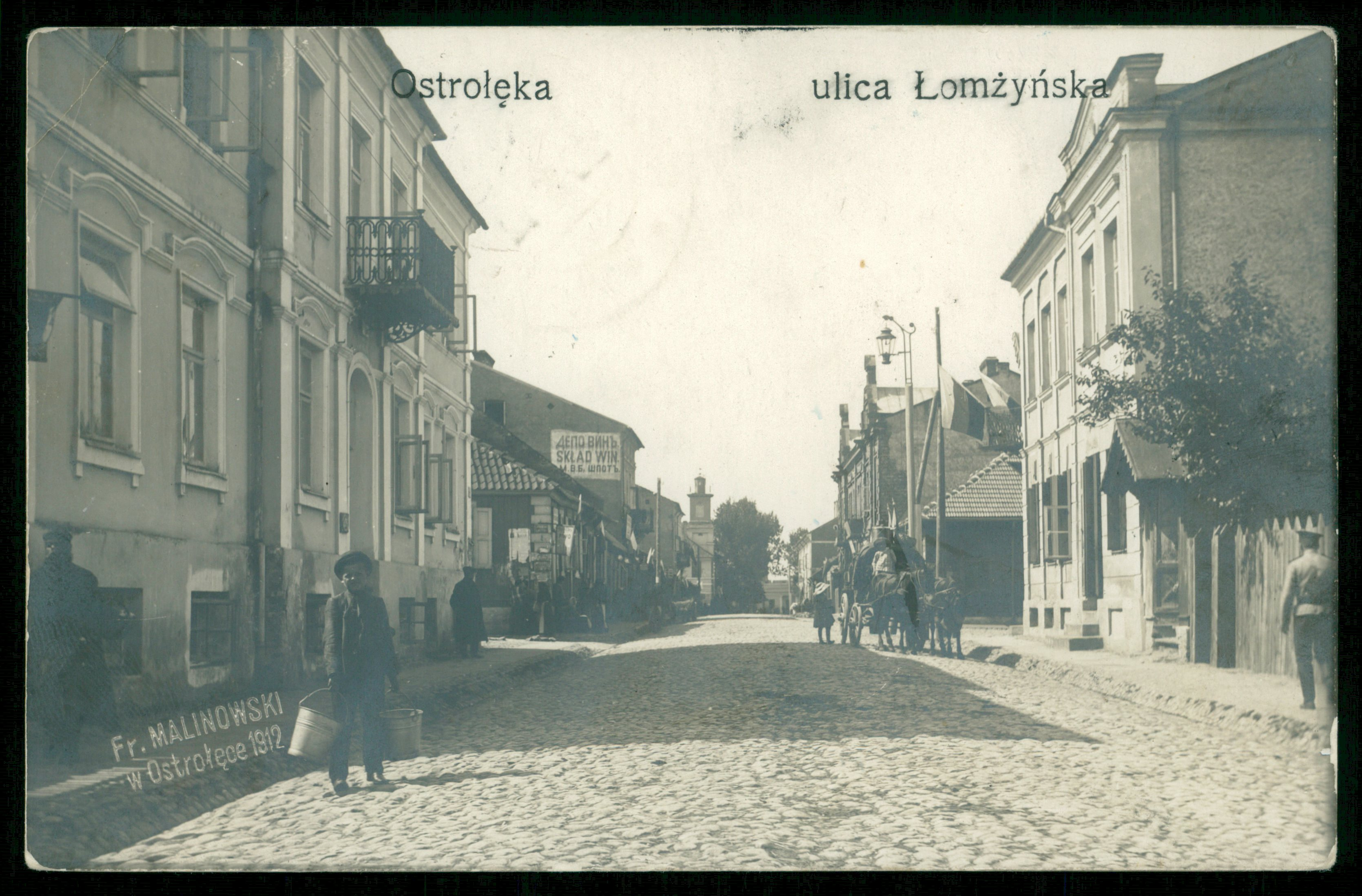
Ostrołęka in 1912

Until the First World War, the city managed to develop, but it was still a relatively unremarkable small town. The First World War destroyed its peaceful and monotonous character. Confiscation and forced labor devastated the economy caused rising prices for essential products, and generally caused the city to decline. In 1915, military operations in the territory of Polish Kingdom intensified. By July, the city was situated on the front line during the Russian Great Retreat, and in August 1915, Germans crossed the river Narew and entered the ruined city. At the time of the German occupation, life in Ostrołęka was as hard as in the time of Russian occupation. Between the years of 1916 and 1918, the Germans greatly exploited the forests for timber. To make transporting the wood easier, they built 40 km (25 mi) of road from Ostrołęka to Myszyniec and a narrow-gauge railway line.

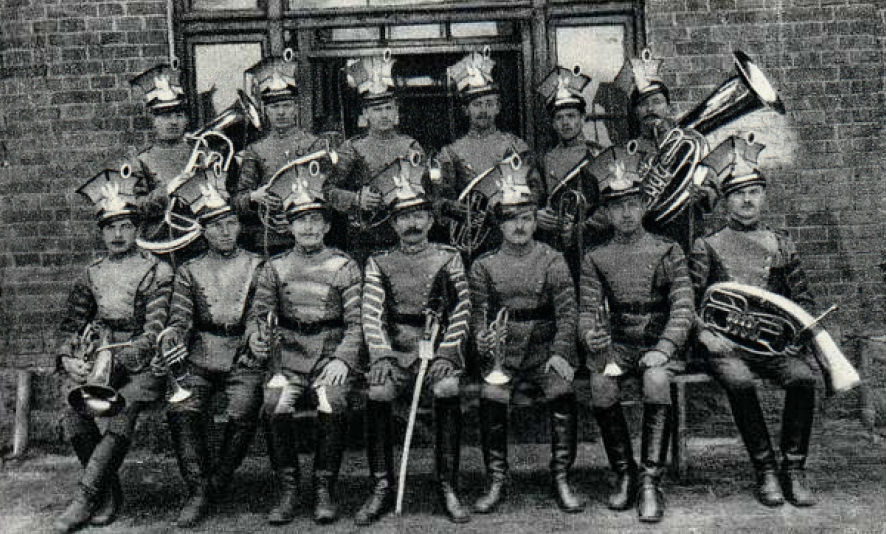
Military band of the 1st Uhlans Regiment of Polish Legions in Ostrołęka, c. 1917

=== Interbellum ===
After the First World War and re-establishment of independent Poland in 1918, the city became a part of the Białystok Voivodeship. 75% of the city and population was devastated. New schools and departments were opened as the city was rebuilt.

During the Polish-Soviet War, Ostrołęka once again became a center for military operations. On 4 August 1920, Soviet forces under the command of Hayk Bzhishkyan took the fort and "butchered the newly assembled cavalry group" of General Bolesław Roja. Local Jewish communists organized a rally in the city, tore Polish emblems and flags from buildings, and the newly appointed revolutionary committee leader, member of Poale Zion, announced to local wealthy Poles and Jews that their property will be taken from them. The local Polish intelligentsia and prominent religious Jews, along with the rabbi, were subjected to forced labour in the city. However, the Soviet occupation was short lived as the Soviet XV Army retreated on 20 August, with Polish forces thundering east towards the former Polish-Soviet border after the Battle of Warsaw (1920).

After the Polish-Soviet War, Ostrołęka began to industrialize. A cinema was opened in 1923, and a power plant in 1928. During the summer of 1939, both sides of the Narew beachhead were fortified.

=== Second World War ===
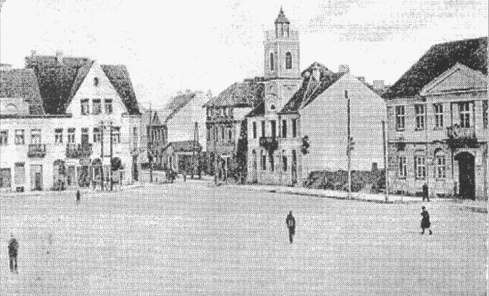
Market square during World War II

During the invasion of Poland, which started World War II, on 10 September 1939 German forces reached Ostrołęka. The Germans immediately carried out searches of Polish offices and organizations. Under German occupation the town was annexed directly to Germany and in 1940 it was renamed Scharfenwiese to remove traces of Polish origin. The Germans expelled its Jewish minority, which was later mostly murdered in the Treblinka extermination camp. Ostrołęka became a border town, today's easternmost areas belonged to USSR.

Quickly, a Polish resistance movement was established with a substantial presence of local Kurpes. Churches and schools were changed into workshops and factories controlled by the Underground. Underground partisans started attacking and destroying German fortifications in and around Ostrołęka.

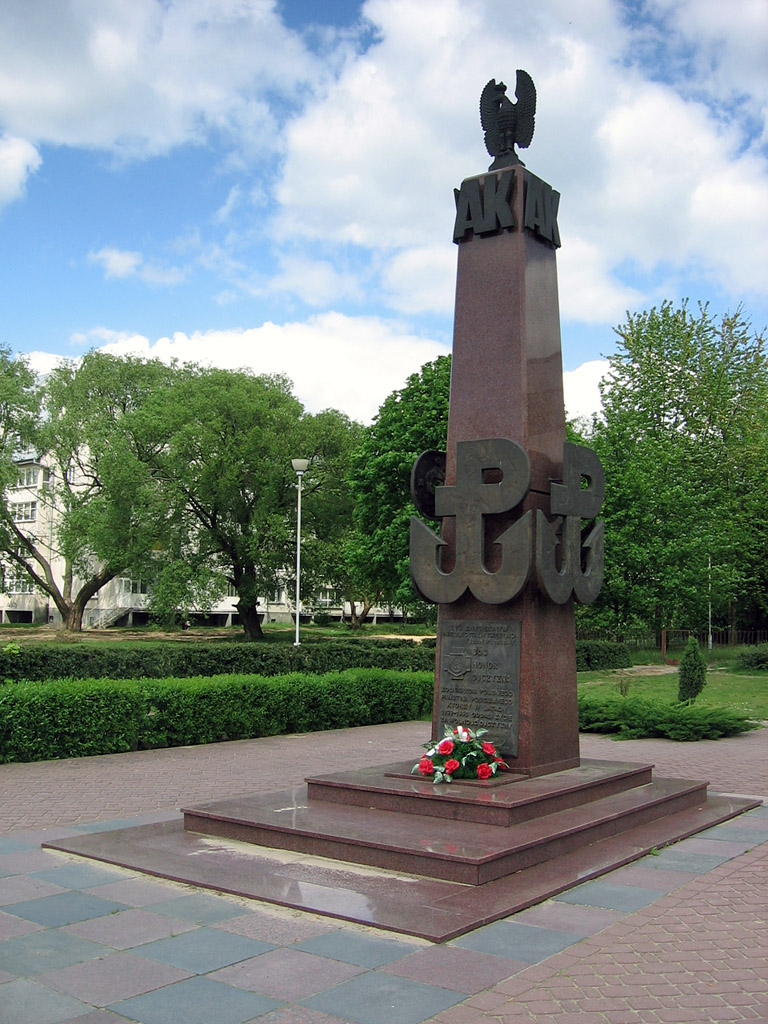
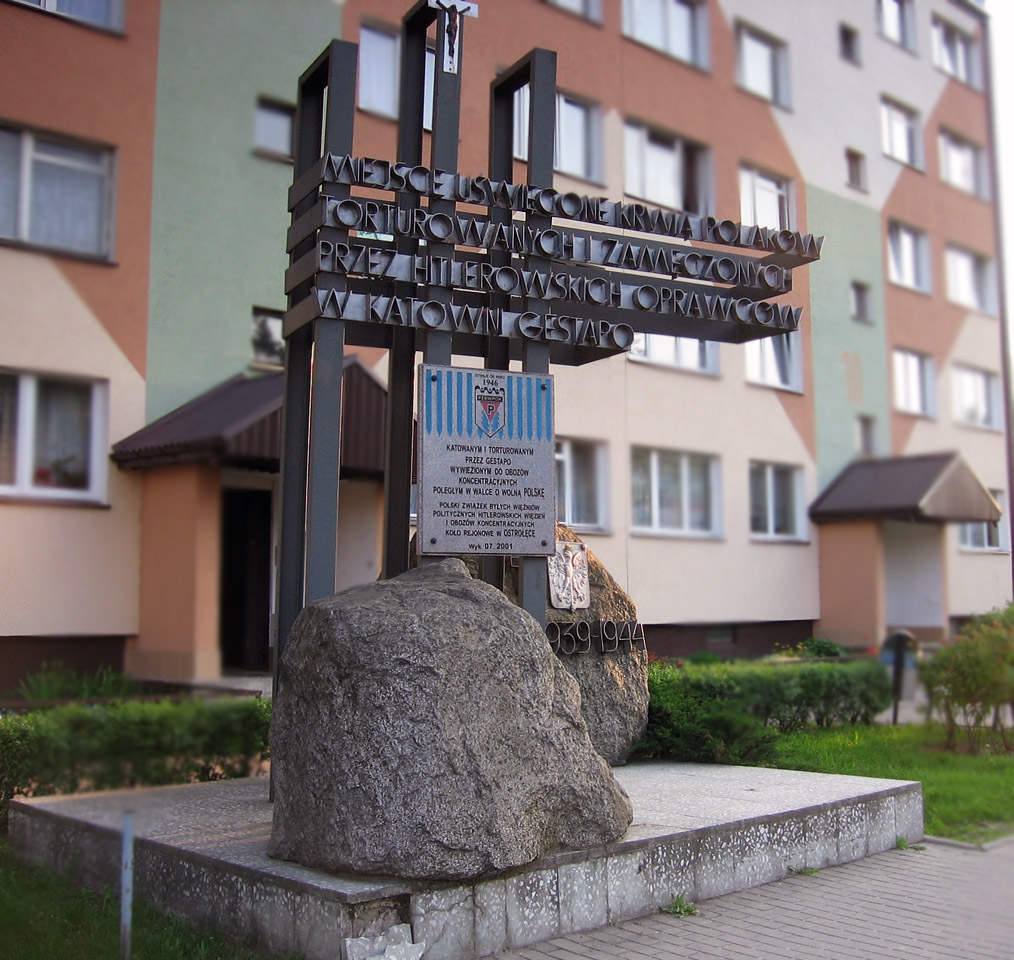
Memorials to the Home Army and local victims of the Gestapo

The Germans established and operated a court prison, in which they held Poles arrested in the city and county during the Intelligenzaktion. Around 500 Poles were then massacred in the nearby forest in January–March 1940. On 5–6 April 1940, the Germans carried out further mass arrests of around 200 Poles in Ostrołęka and nearby villages. The Germans also operated a forced labour camp in the city from 1940 to 1944. In December 1940, German police expelled around 1,150 Poles from Ostrołęka and Wojciechowice (present-day district of Ostrołęka), who were transported in trucks to a camp in Działdowo and then deported to the Krakow and Radom districts of to the General Government, while their houses were handed over to German colonists as part of the Lebensraum policy. A minority of citizens of Ostrołęka declared themselves as Volksdeutsche and signed the Volksliste. Jews that survived the Holocaust emigrated to Israel. Several local Jews were rescued by Poles, who hid them from the Germans in nearby villages. The German occupation ended in September 1944, and the city was restored to Poland, although with a Soviet-installed communist regime, which then stayed in power until the Fall of Communism in the 1980s.

=== People's Republic of Poland ===
On 18 May 1945, the Polish anti-communist resistance took control of the city. On 24 July 1945, there was another skirmish between Polish partisans and the communist NKVD and UB. In the following years, the resistance remained active in the city and area, including several regional and local organizations.

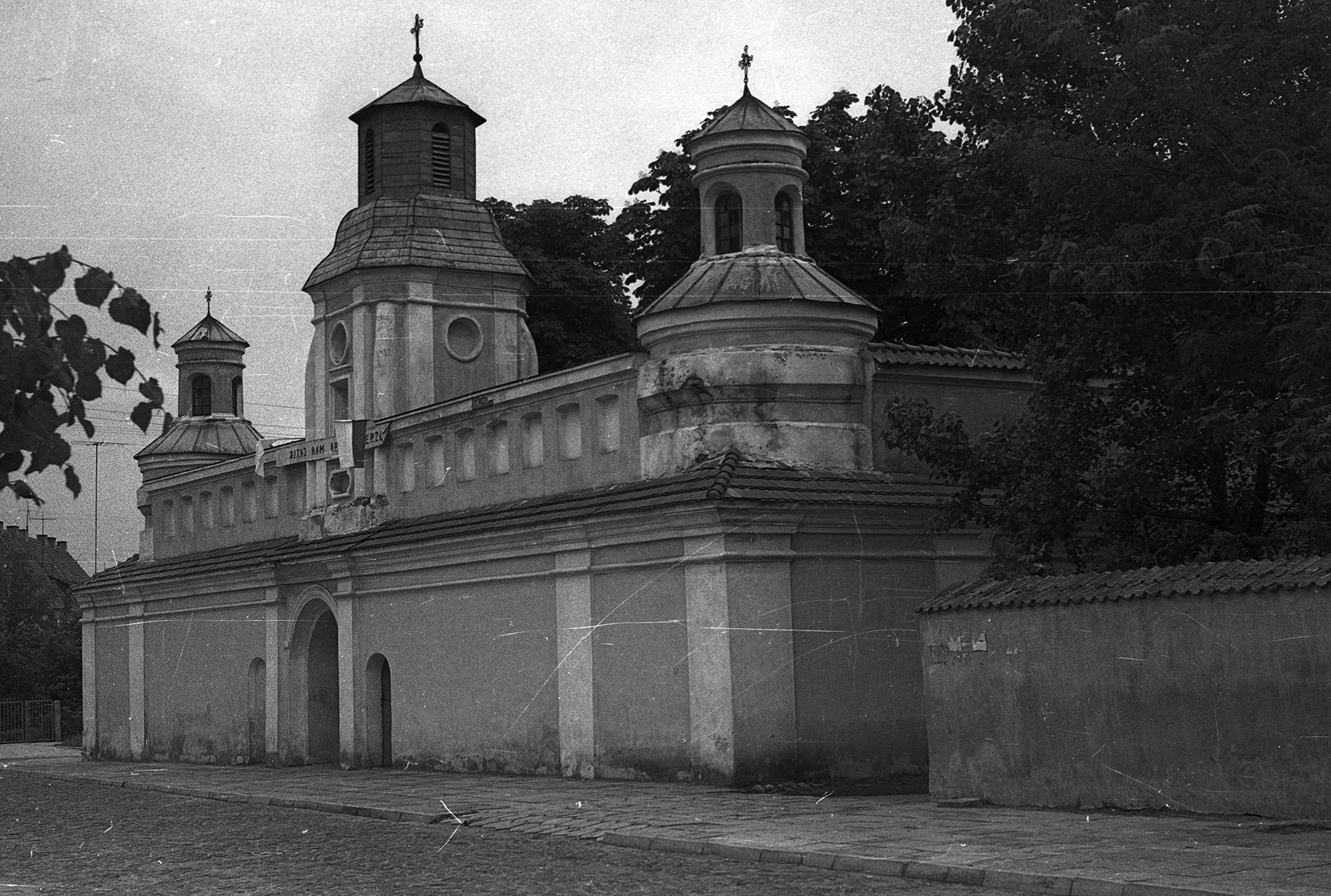
Gate of the Bernardine monastery in 1972

Ostrołęka recovered very slowly from the war. A plan created by communist authorities, which allowed for an improvement of the economic situation in Poland, gave Ostrołęka a chance for redevelopment. Ostrołęka became a central city of Warsaw's region. In 1959, a cellulose and paper factory was built. Next, a sewage refinery was built along the banks of the Narew, which was supposed to keep water in the Narew clean without destroying its biological life. In 1973 a cellular concrete factory was built in the district of Wojciechowice. New jobs brought people to the city and caused a development of alimentary industry. During the 1970s a new factory, "Future", producing wooden articles was opened. A new swimming pool, a stadium for 5000 people, and a holiday resort were built. A new hospital was built. From 1975 to 1998, it was the capital of the Ostrołęka Voivodeship.

=== Ostrołęka since 1989 ===
In 1989 the city entered a new era of capitalism, which has lasted until the present day. The same year Ostrołęka was granted provincial rights. The paper factory Cellulose downsized en masse after privatisation. The factory Future went bankrupt but small service establishments were opened for average people to invest their money. A new hospital was built in the new century. The economy also developed. Three new trade pavilions were built. "Cellulose" changed its name to "Intercell" (later purcharsed by Finnish company Stora Enso) and the cellular concrete factory was bought by the Ytong company. The centre of the city began to fulfill trade functions.

In 1996, a second permanent bridge, "Most im. Antoniego Madalińskiego", was built. In 1999 the city became a district city. A new aquapark was opened in September 2010. A modernisation of the city stadium or even a completely new stadium is planned to be built in this decade, while two new modern training grounds for football are currently being built.

A new power plant was originally planned to open by 2015 with a capacity of 1,000 MW; however, construction was halted in 2012. Following a change in government and the takeover of power by PiS, work resumed in 2018, but the project was suspended again in 2020 due to projected permanent unprofitability.

Currently, the Central Anti-Corruption Bureau is conducting an ongoing investigation into the circumstances surrounding the termination of the project. Furthermore, the Supreme Audit Office has estimated the resulting financial losses to be approximately PLN 1.35 billion.

In June 2026, PKP Intercity launched the city's first-ever direct, long-distance railway connection on the Olsztyn–Białystok route. The new service offering travel times of just 1 hour and 40 minutes to Olsztyn, and approximately 1 hour and 57 minutes to Białystok. Crucially, this route also marks the restoration of passenger rail connections to nearby Łomża for the first time since 1993, with a travel time of approximately 28 minutes.

On 7 October 2026, a stabbing took place in school no. 4 in Ostrołęka. Ten people including the perpetrator sustained injuries.

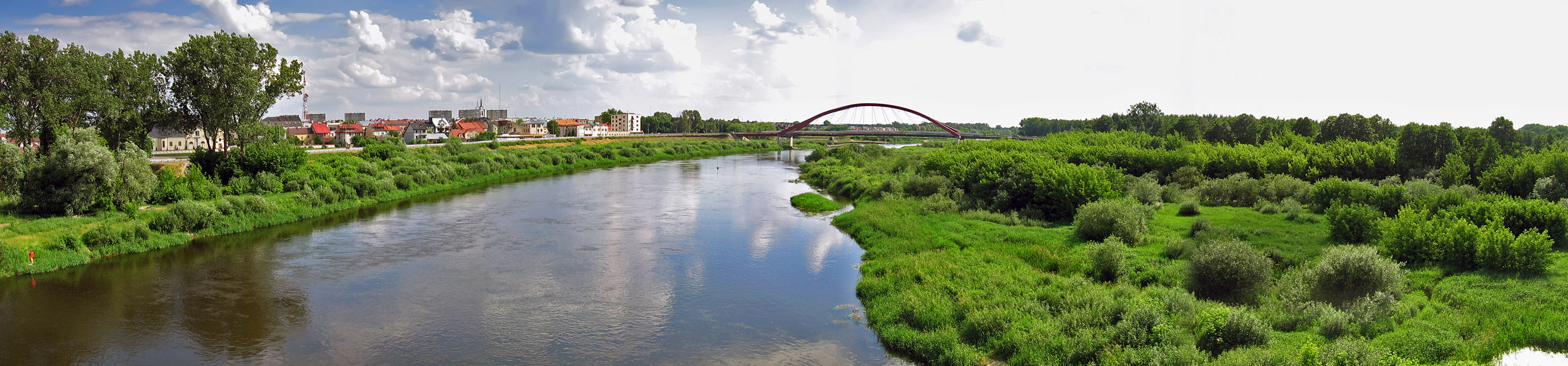

== Demographics ==
Historical population

Year	Pop.	±%
1560	2,000	—
1616	1,400	−30.0%
1676	415	−70.4%
1777	1,674	+303.4%
1807	2,036	+21.6%
1826	2,562	+25.8%
1829	2,883	+12.5%

Year	Pop.	±%
1847	2,042	−29.2%
1897	7,965	+290.1%
1913	13,500	+69.5%
1916	4,907	−63.7%
1921	9,145	+86.4%
1931	13,341	+45.9%
1939	15,000	+12.4%

Year	Pop.	±%
1945	7,950	−47.0%
1950	10,409	+30.9%
1960	15,216	+46.2%
1970	22,160	+45.6%
1985	44,097	+99.0%
2000	55,658	+26.2%
2010	53,710	−3.5%

== Education ==
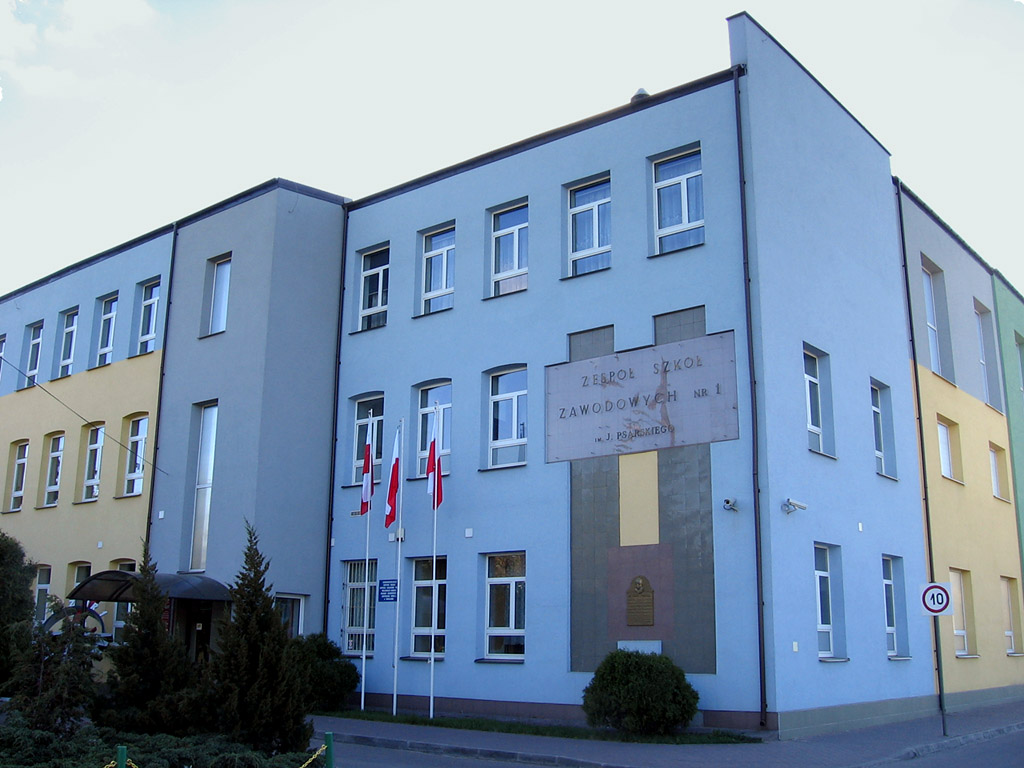
ZSZ nr. 1 in Ostroleka

- Wyższa Szkoła Administracji Publicznej
- Wyższa Szkoła Ekonomiczno-Społeczna

== Transport ==
Ostrołęka lies on national roads 61 and 53.

Furthermore, Ostrołęka has railway station and train connections to various major cities in Poland, including Warsaw, Olsztyn and Białystok, and various towns in the region, including Chorzele, Łomża, Szczytno, Tłuszcz, Wielbark and Wyszków. It is planned to launch a long-distance service served by PKP Intercity to Gdynia via Ostrołęka in the future.

== Sport ==
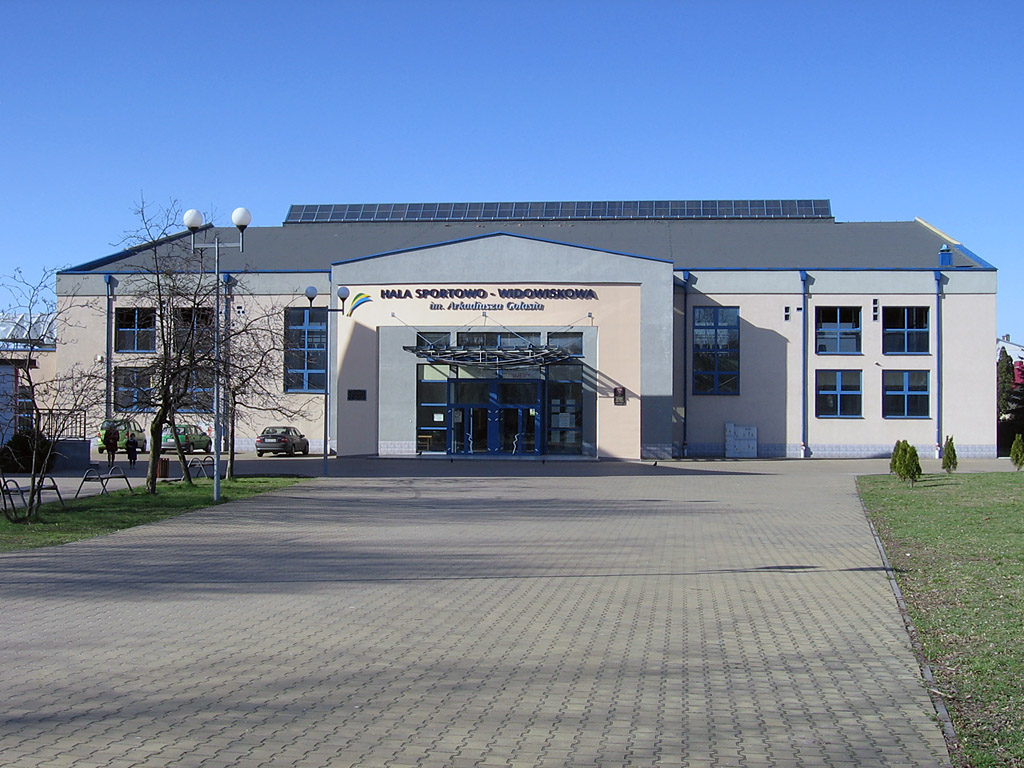
Indoor sports arena

=== Football ===
- Narew Ostrołęka – football team established in 1962. Currently playing in 5th league, Mazovia group I;
- Korona Ostrołęka – football team established in 1998, dissolved in 2020 (main team). Last played in the 4th league, Mazovia northern group;
- KS Jantar Ostrołęka – female football team established in 2010. Currently playing in 3rd women's football league, group I.

=== Volleyball ===
- Energa Omis Ostrołęka – Male volleyball team established in 2000, dissolved in 2018. Last played in the 2nd Polish league;
- OTPS Nike Ostrołęka – Female volleyball team currently playing in the 3rd Polish league.

=== Handball ===
- Trójka Ostrołęka – Male handball team currently playing in the 3nd league.

=== Basketball ===
- OTK Ostrołęka – Male basketball team.
- OKK Ostrołęka – Male basketball team.
- MUKS Unia Basket Ostrołęka – Female basketball team.

== See also ==
- Kurpie
