= Fashion photography =

Genre of photography

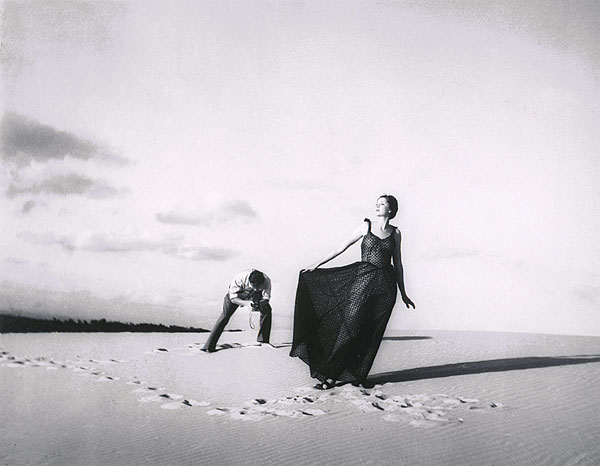
- Fashion Shot at Cronulla, 1937
- Genre of: Photography
- Type of: Product photography
- related fields: Digital photography, Photojournalism, Food photography, Fashion illustration
- Media related to Fashion photography at Wikimedia Commons

Fashion photography is a genre of photography that portrays clothing and other fashion items. This sometimes includes haute couture garments. It typically consists of a fashion photographer taking pictures of a dressed model in a photographic studio or an outside setting. It originated from the clothing and fashion industries, and while some fashion photography has been elevated as art, it is still primarily used commercially for clothing, perfumes and beauty products.

Fashion photography is most often conducted for advertisements or fashion magazines such as Vogue, Vanity Fair, and Elle. It has become a necessary way for fashion designers to promote their work. Fashion photography has developed its own aesthetic in which the clothes and fashions are enhanced by the presence of exotic locations or accessories.

The history of this type of photography was intertwined for its first decades with the fashion magazines in which the photographs appeared, replacing the fashion illustrations that initially dominated the magazines. It gained prominence as its photographers, such as Irving Penn or Richard Avedon, gained recognition. While the beginning of modern fashion photography is symbolically attributed to 1911, it was not until the mid-1930s that its popularity spread, with its heyday beginning after the Second World War.

This photographic genre has spread from fashion magazines and is featured in coffee table books, art galleries and museums.

== History ==
=== Origins of fashion photography ===
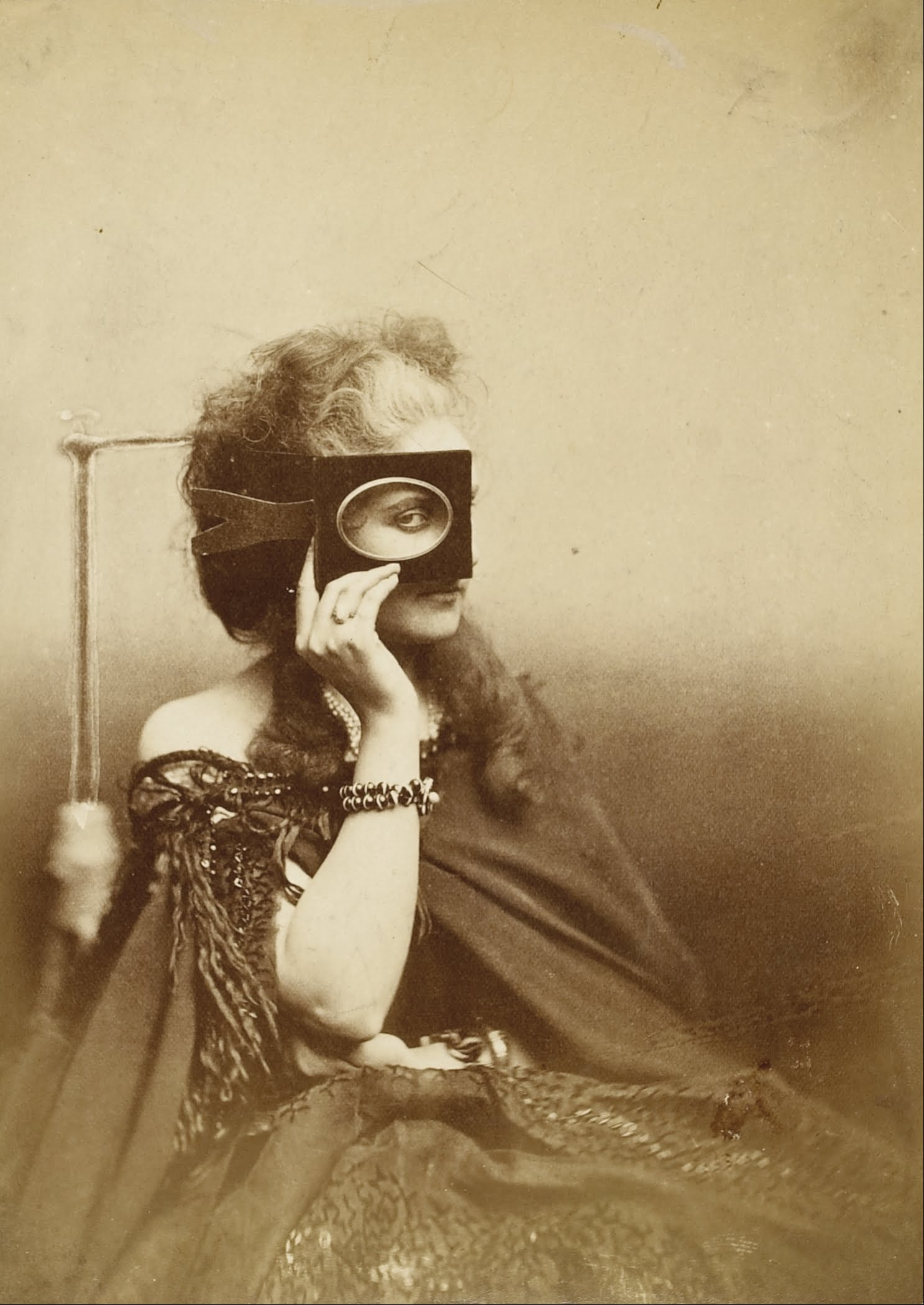
The Countess in a photo by Pierre-Louise Pierson (c. 1863/66)

Fashion photography has been in existence since the earliest days of photography. The oldest surviving photograph taken on camera was made by Nicéphore Niépce in 1826, but people would soon use photography to present costumes and garb. Beginning in 1856, Virginia Oldoini, Countess di Castiglione, a Tuscan noblewoman at the court of Napoleon III directed imperial court photographer, Pierre-Louis Pierson to help her create 700 different photographs in which she re-created the signature moments of her life for the camera. Many of the photographs depict her in official court attire while other outfits ranged from the theatrical to the absurd, making her arguably the first fashion model.

In 1881, fashion photographs started to be included with French textile sample books. Ten years later, Mme. Caroline de Broutelles founded French fashion magazine La Mode Pratique which became the first to feature fashion photographs in print in 1892. American magazine Harper's Bazaar would soon follow.

=== The 1900s and 1910s ===
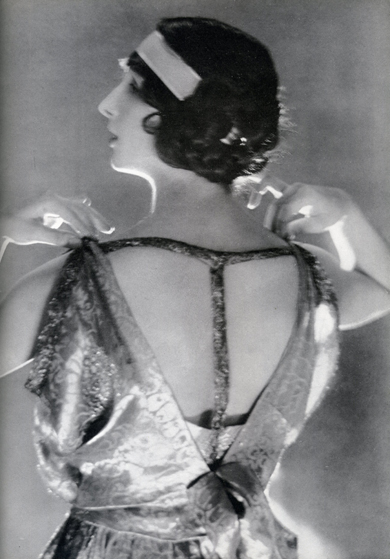
Actress Helen Lee Worthing, by Baron Adolph de Meyer, Vogue (US), December 1919

In the first decade of the 20th century, advances in halftone printing allowed fashion photographs to be used in magazines, which caused fashion magazines to become popular subscriptions in the United States. In 1909, Condé Nast took over Vogue magazine and also contributed to the beginnings of fashion photography. In 1911, photographer Edward Steichen was "dared" by Lucien Vogel, the publisher of Jardin des Modes and La Gazette du Bon Ton, to promote fashion as a fine art by the use of photography. Steichen then took photos of gowns designed by couturier Paul Poiret. These photographs were published in the April 1911 issue of the magazine Art et Décoration. According to Jesse Alexander, This is "...now considered to be the first ever modern fashion photography shoot. That is, photographing the garments in such a way as to convey a sense of their physical quality as well as their formal appearance, as opposed to simply illustrating the object."

Steichen's 1911 shoot, however, was, at the time, a one-off as Steichen left the fashion scene, opening the way for Baron Adolph de Meyer to become the prominent name in the industry. De Meyer would be hired by the multimedia company, Condé Nast, and become the first full-time photographer for Vogue in 1913. De Meyer's photograph style creating a delicate ambiance, which used a combination of romantic lighting and floral decorations while softening the focus, became imitated by so many other photographers that it soon became outmoded by 1923 when he left Condé Nast.

=== The 1920s and 1930s ===
Baron de Meyer's replacement as staff photographer would be Edward Steichen, himself, who brought in a crisp, modernist style focusing on the model rather than the settings and surroundings. His novel approach would increase his reputational standing. Steichen's high esteem as a photographer led him not only to Vogue as the chief photographer, but Vanity Fair as well, for fourteen years.

Vogue was followed by its rival, Harper's Bazaar, and the two companies were leaders in the field of fashion photography throughout the 1920s and 1930s. House photographers such as Steichen, George Hoyningen-Huene, Horst P. Horst and Cecil Beaton transformed the genre into an outstanding art form.

In the mid-1930s as World War II approached, the focus shifted to the United States, where Vogue and Harper's continued their old rivalry. The fashion model was first discovered in 1853.

In 1936, Martin Munkacsi made the first photographs of models in sporty poses at the beach. Under the artistic direction of Alexey Brodovitch, Harper's Bazaar quickly introduced this new style into its magazine.

During 1928 to 1940, a French photographic journal Vu was issued by Lucien Vogel, who had started working in fashion publications, and his wife Cosette de Brunhoff, the first editor of French Vogue in 1920. They made innovative fashion photography using montage techniques and experimented with new lightweight cameras. The covers they produced included celebrities as well as students; their work centered on haute couture and investigative journalism. Compared to the works of Vogue at that time, their work seemed to have more edge.

=== World War II ===
From 1939 and onward, what had previously been the flourishing and sizeable industry of fashion photography all but stopped due to the beginnings of World War II. The United States and Europe quickly diverged from one another. What had previously been a togetherness and inspired working relationship diverged with Paris occupied and London under siege. Paris, the main fashion power house of the time quickly became isolated from the United States—especially with Vogue Paris shutting down for a brief hiatus in 1940. With these changes, the photography based out of the USA gained a distinct Americana vibe—models often posed with flags, American brand cars, and generally just fulfilling the American ideal. What did remain of the French and British fashion photography on the other hand often had a wartime overlay to the content. Cecil Beaton's 'Fashion is Indestructible' from 1941 displays a well-dressed woman viewing the rubble that once was Middle Temple in London. Similarly, Lee Miller began taking photos of women in Paris and London, modeling the latest designs for gas masks and bicycling with pin curlers in their hair, as they did not have electricity with which to curl their hair. Images such as these remain scarred into the face of fashion photography of the time and display a common sentiment among the fashionable world and the public. Even fashion photographers worked to document the issues surrounding and work towards a documentation of the time—even if within the frame of fashion. These photos are an especially good indication of the fashionable emotions of the time. Many felt that fashion photography, during wartime especially, was frivolous and unnecessary. Yet, the few who worked to preserve the industry did so in new and inventive ways throughout the duration of the war.

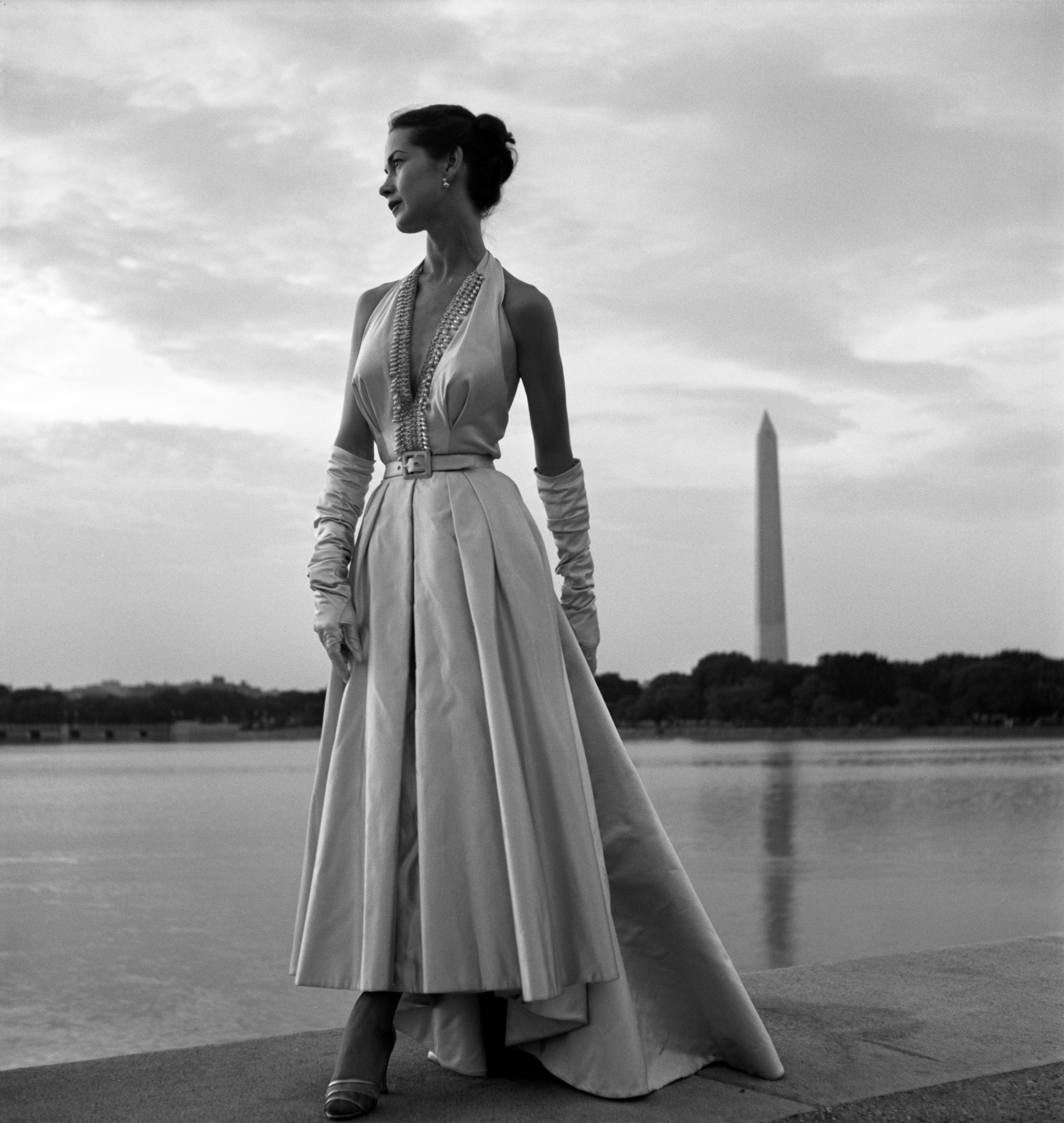
Fashion photograph by Toni Frissell, 1949

=== Postwar developments ===
In postwar London, John French pioneered a new form of fashion photography suited to reproduction in newsprint, involving natural light and low contrast.

After the Second World War style went through dramatic changes. A range of new designers appeared during the 1950s and 1960s, and they produced more diverse styles of clothing. In 1983, Vanity Fair hired Annie Leibovitz as its first chief photographer to continue Steichen's legacy in modern photography through celebrity portraits.

Two Germans revolutionized fashion photography at the end of the 20th century. Helmut Newton and his wife settled in Paris in 1961 and his mages appeared in magazines including the French edition of Vogue and Harper's Bazaar. Newton established a particular style, marked by erotic, stylised images, often with sado-masochistic and fetishistic subtexts. Karl Lagerfeld was a couturier for many years before turning to photography in 1987 after being frustrated with images taken for Chanel press kits. From then on, he began to photograph advertising campaigns and arranging store displays. In 2012 he even released a photo-book — The Little Black Jacket — which featured entertainers, models, and friends of his.

=== The 1990s ===
In the early 1990s, experimental fashion photography gained a following through independent London magazines such as The Face and Dazed & Confused. Photographers, stylists, and art directors in the United Kingdom all drew inspiration from popular music, street style, and digital technology.

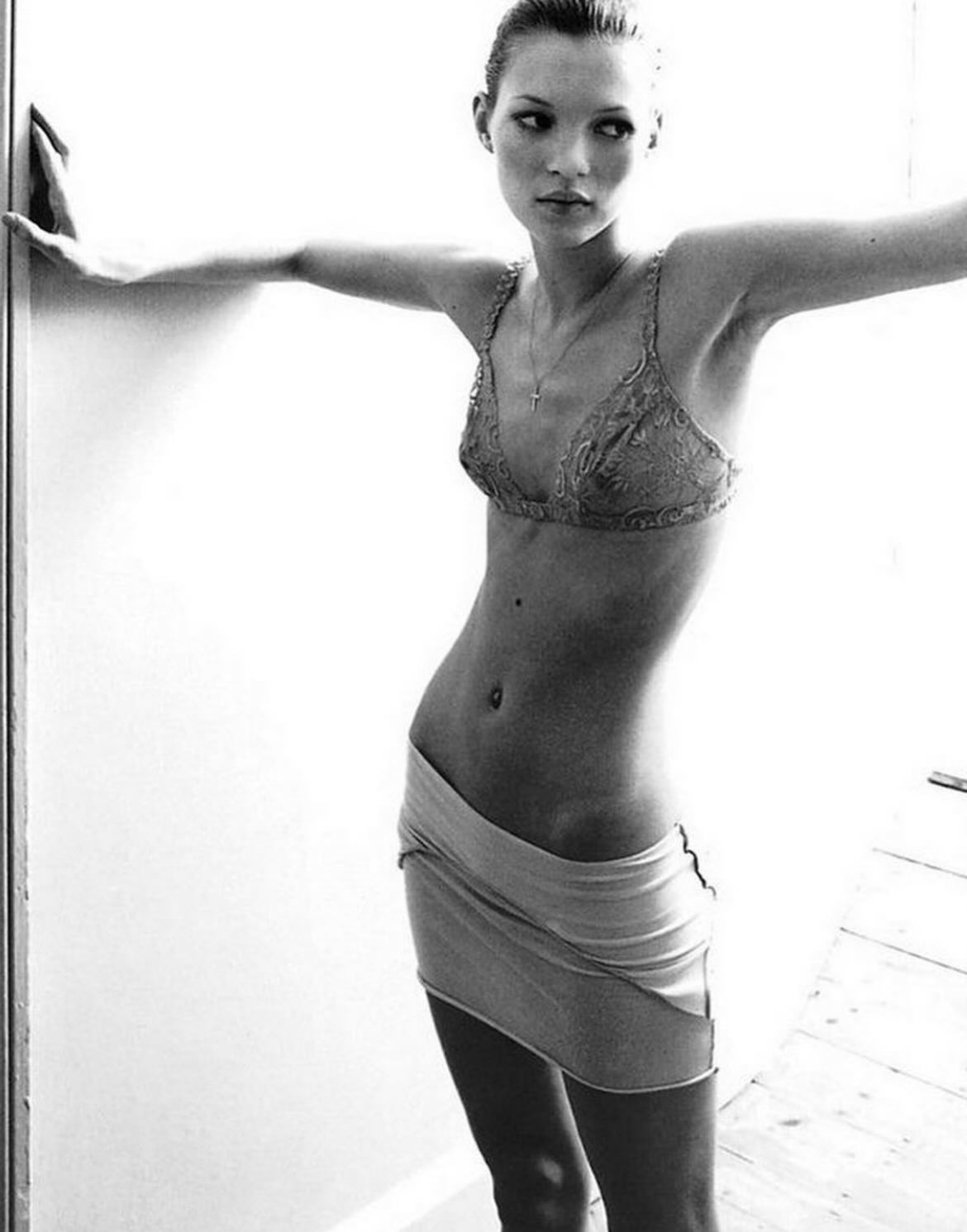
Kate Moss by Corinne Day for British Vogue, June 1993

Corinne Day, a self-taught photographer, introduced a "grunge" aesthetic that contrasted with the glamorous images typical of the 1980s. Her work for The Face in the 1990s helped launch the career of a young model, Kate Moss. Day's raw documentary-style photographs helped bring grunge, a subculture that originated in Seattle in the 1980s, into luxury fashion. During this period, the line between art and fashion became less distinct. In 2004, the Tate made its first acquisition of fashion photography, a set of Day's prints.

== Street style photography ==
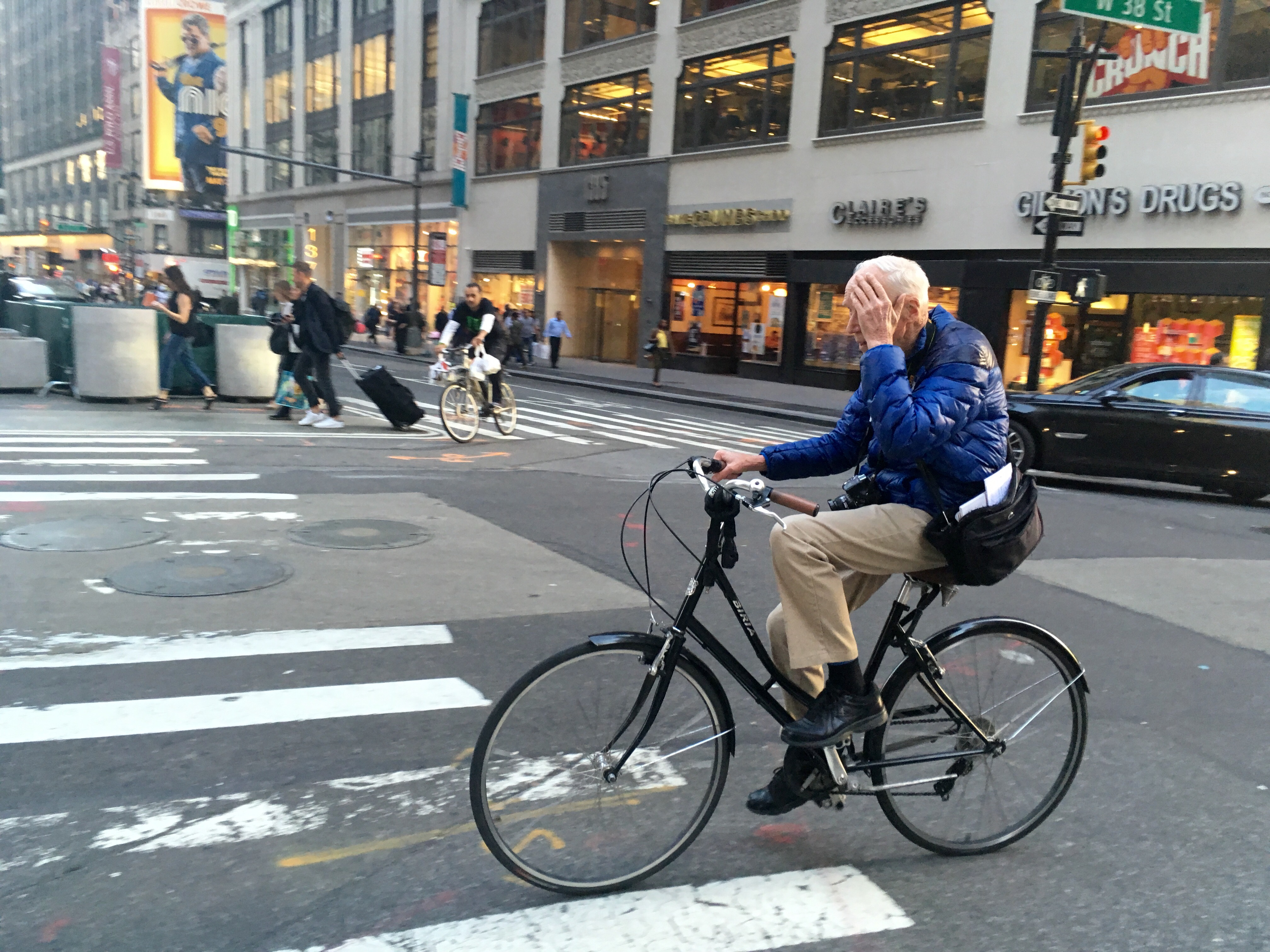
Bill Cunningham riding a bike in Midtown Manhattan, May 2016

Street style photography documents how ordinary people dress, rather than professional models posing for a shoot. Bill Cunningham is often credited with pioneering this concept. In 1966, while covering fashion in London for the Chicago Tribune, Cunningham met photographer David Montgomery. A few months later, Montgomery gave him an Olympus Pen-D camera and told him to use it as a notebook. The New York Times first published his street photographs in December 1978, and he later photographed the paper's regular column "On the Street" until his death in 2016.

In the second half of the 2000s, blogs such as Scott Schuman's The Sartorialist and Tommy Ton's Jak & Jil expanded the reach of street style fashion with their large online audiences, which helped draw the fashion industry into digital media. Some street photographers began working directly with fashion brands. Schuman, for example, appeared in a Gap campaign and later photographed one for DKNY Jeans.

== Digital era ==
Blogs and Instagram have let people outside the fashion industry take and share their own fashion photographs. This shift changed both the appearance of fashion photography and who produces it. In the 2000s fashion blogging allowed newcomers to photograph and publish street style. Brent Luvaas, an anthropologist, studied street style blogs around the world and ran his own blog as part of his research. He found that most of these bloggers had no formal training in photography or fashion, yet they were largely well-educated, middle-class people, and many used expensive professional cameras to produce fashion images. In the 2010s, Instagram, a photo- and video-sharing platform, became a major space for fashion imagery. The informal style of Instagram images, such as mirror selfies, contrasted with the look of traditional formal fashion photography. Brands began designing advertising campaigns for the platform, including pictures and short video clips. Influencer photography also drew inspiration from the visual aspects of street style photography, such as busy city streets and natural light. On social media, influencers often act as photographers, models, and product promoters at the same time, working without professional photographers or production teams.

== Gallery ==
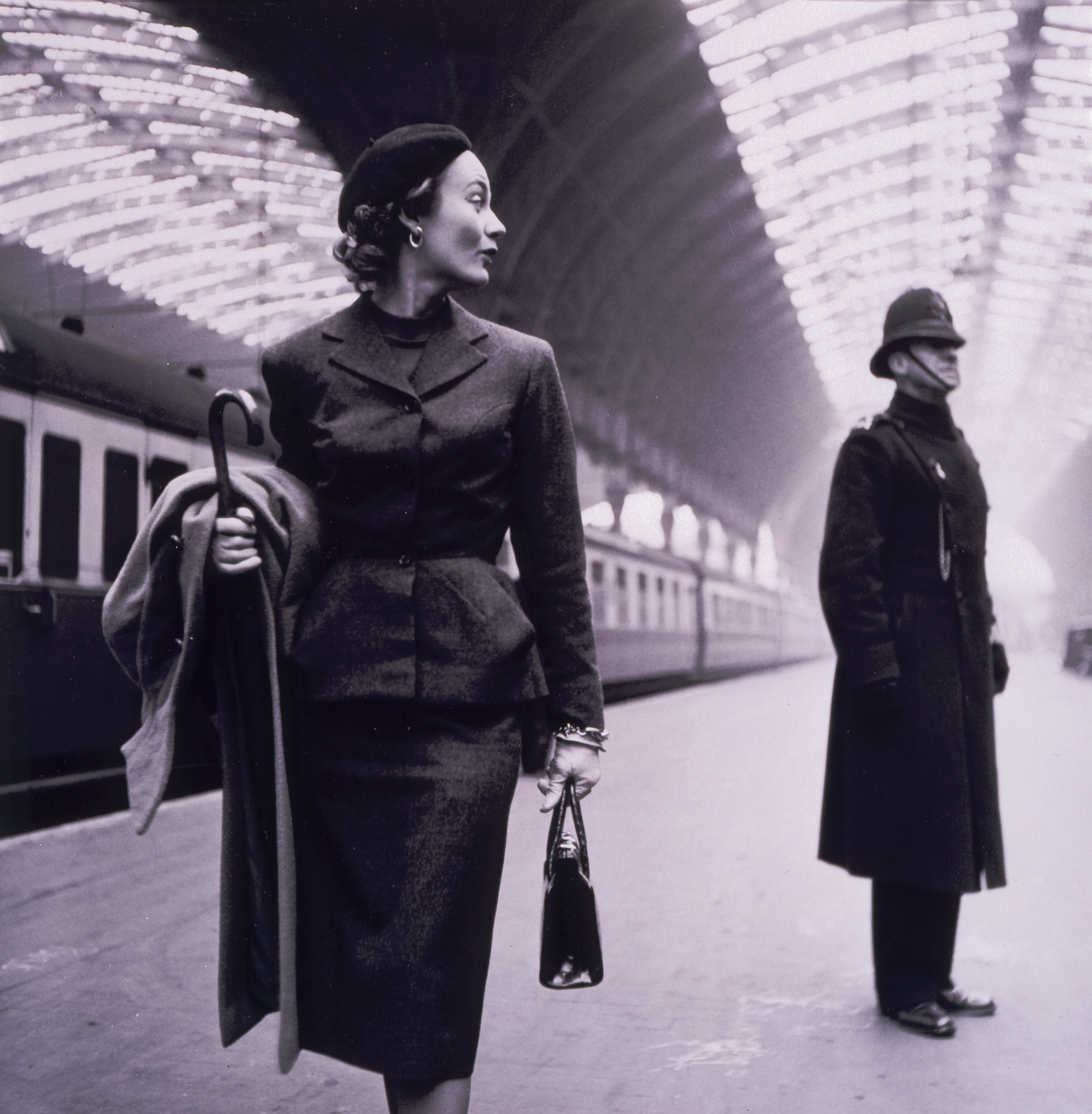
Paddington Station by Toni Frissell, 1951

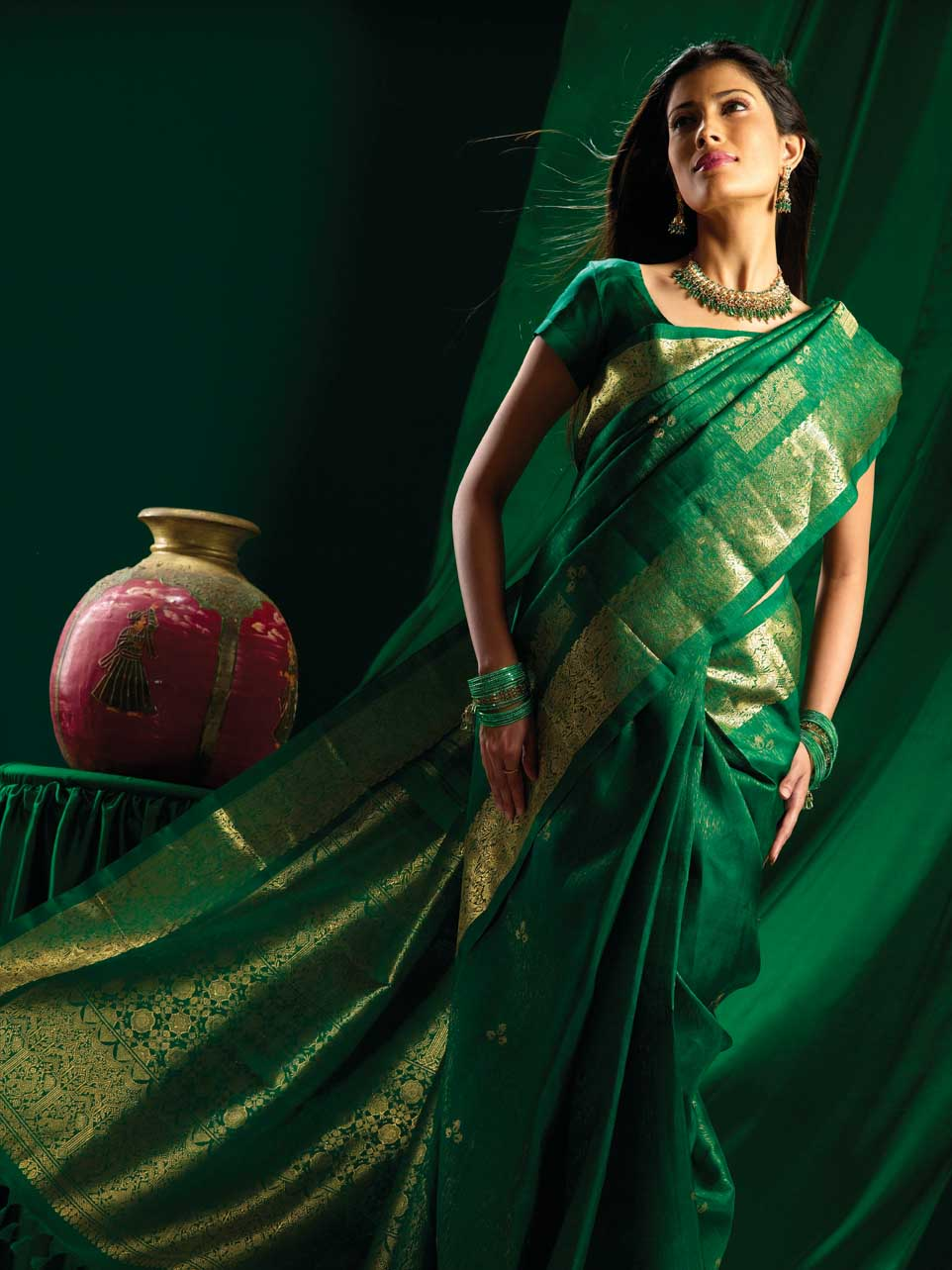
Photograph of a green brocade silk saree

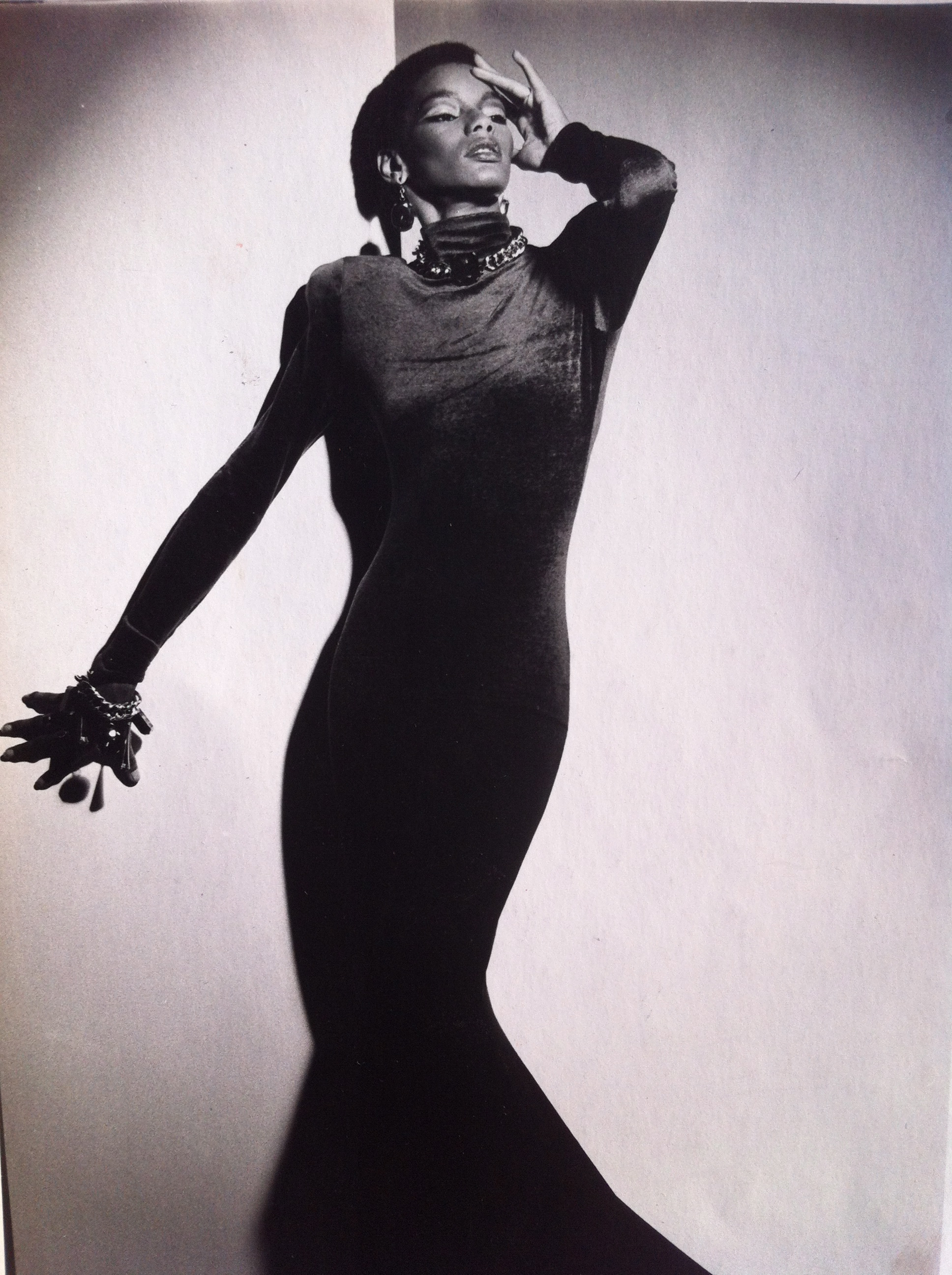
Renée Gunter modeling haute couture

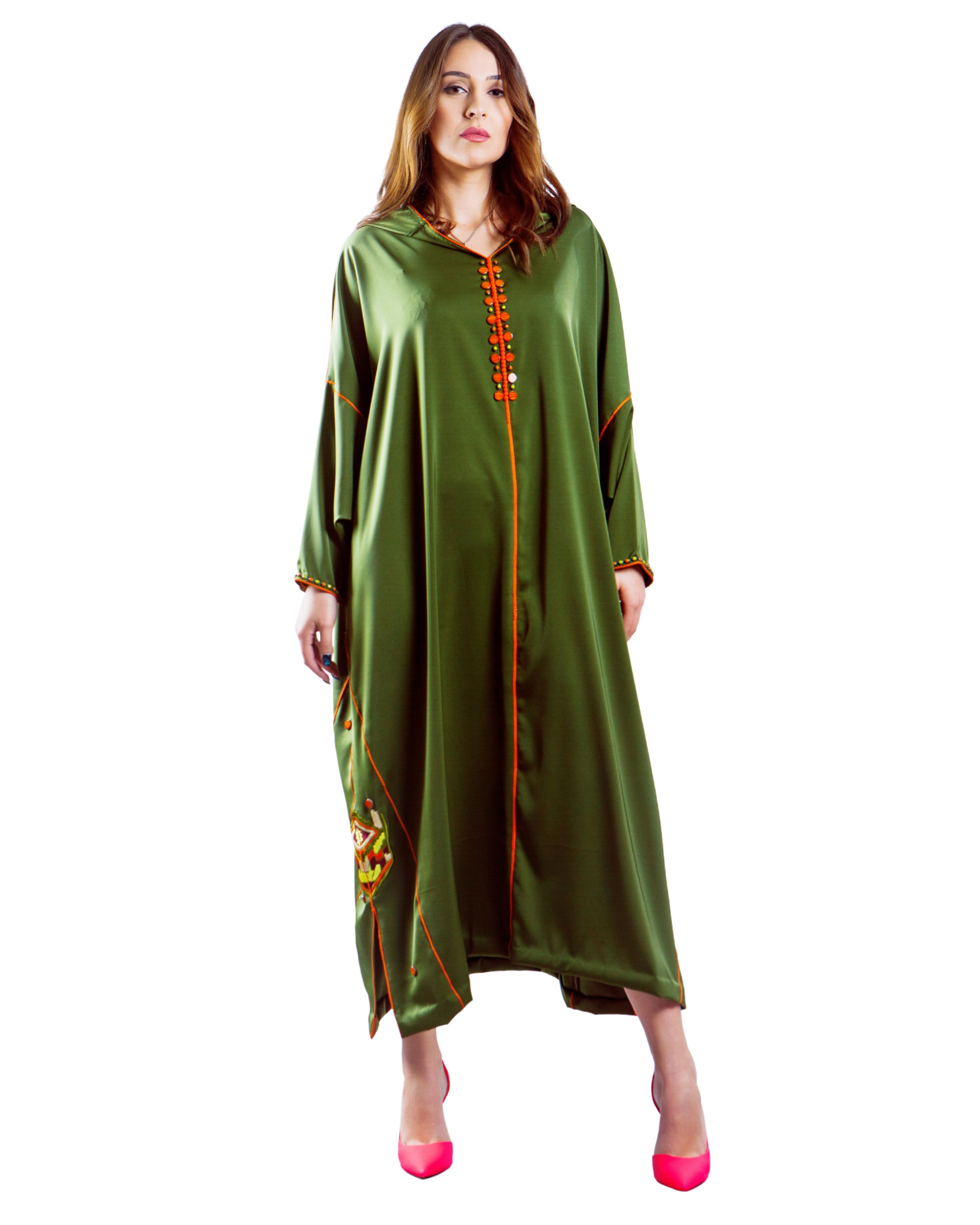
Model in green Moroccan djellaba edited for online product display

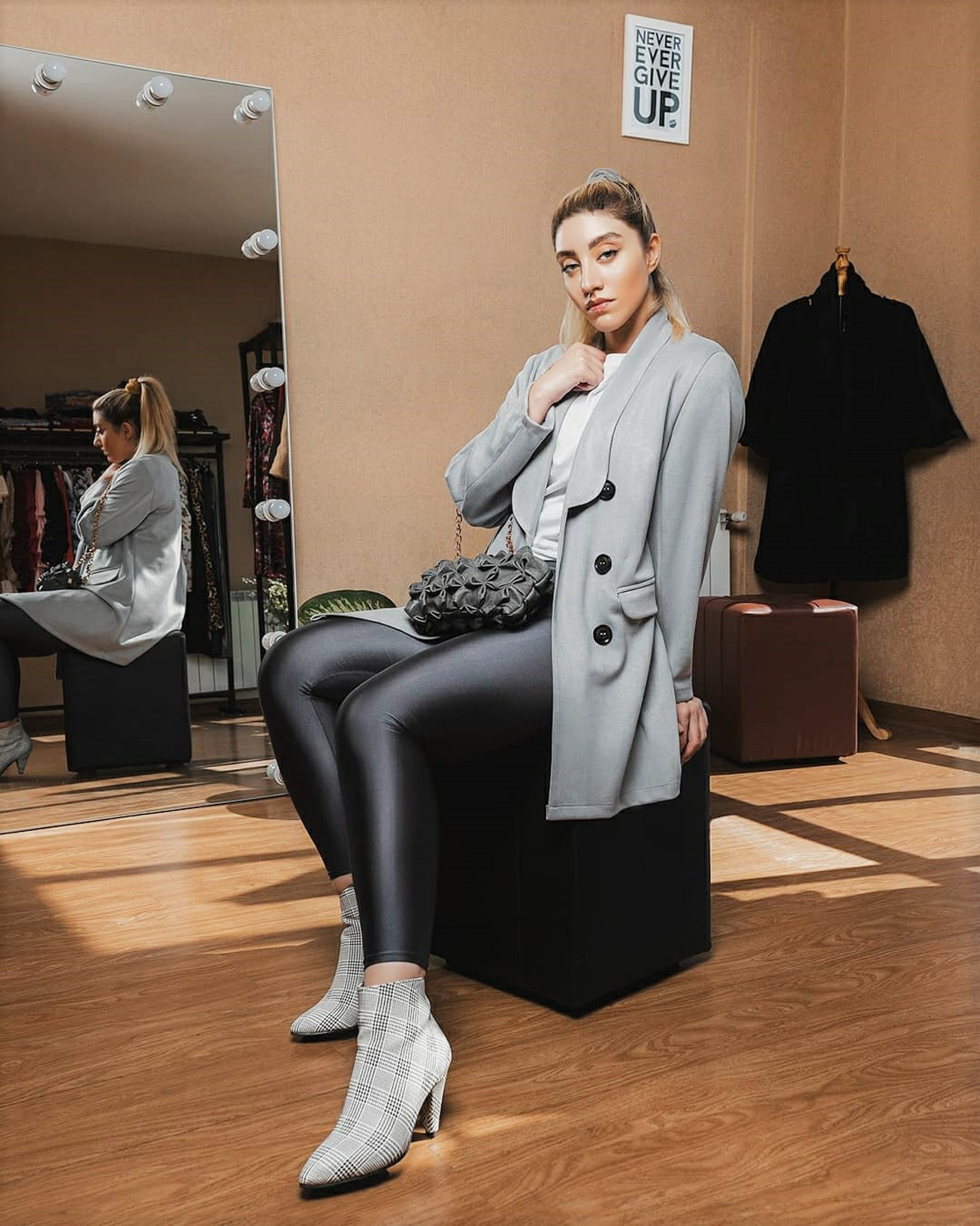
Photoshoot in Tehran, Iran
