= Greener =

Greener is a surname. Notable people with the surname include:

- Bob Greener (1899–1970), English professional footballer
- Christopher Greener (1943–2015), United Kingdom's tallest human
- Dorothy Greener (1917–1971) English-born American actress and comedian
- Leaf Greener, Chinese fashion journalist
- Matthew Greener, British musician
- Richard Theodore Greener (1844–1922), American diplomat
- William Greener (1806–1869), English inventor and gunsmith

== See also ==
- "Greener", rock song by the American rock band Tally Hall featured on the 2005 album Marvin's Marvelous Mechanical Museum.
- Greener, 1994 stop-motion film directed by Mark Osborne.
- W.W. Greener, English arms-making firm
