= Maurice Reymond de Broutelles =

Swiss artist (1862–1936)

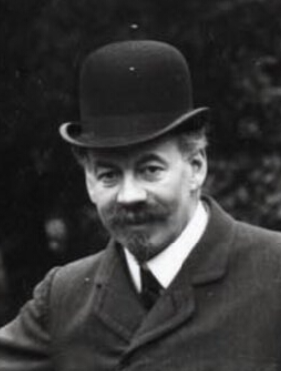
Reymond in 1909

J. Maurice Reymond de Broutelles (born Maurice Reymond, de Broutelles being his spouse's name, and sometimes also given as "de Brouteilles", 26 April 1862 – 17 November 1936) was a Swiss sculptor, painter, and engraver who worked in Paris, France.

Born in Geneva, Reymond studied in Paris at the Ecole des Beaux-Arts under Henri Chapu and Félix Joseph Barrias. In 1889, he married Caroline de Broutelles, the soon-to-be founder and editor of fashion magazine La Mode Pratique., taking her name as his own.

Reymond had his atelier in Paris, where he frequently presented his works at expositions. At the Expositions Universelles in Paris in 1889 and in 1900 he was awarded a bronze and a silver medal for his works, respectively. He died in Paris at the age of 74.

== Selected works ==
Sculptures:

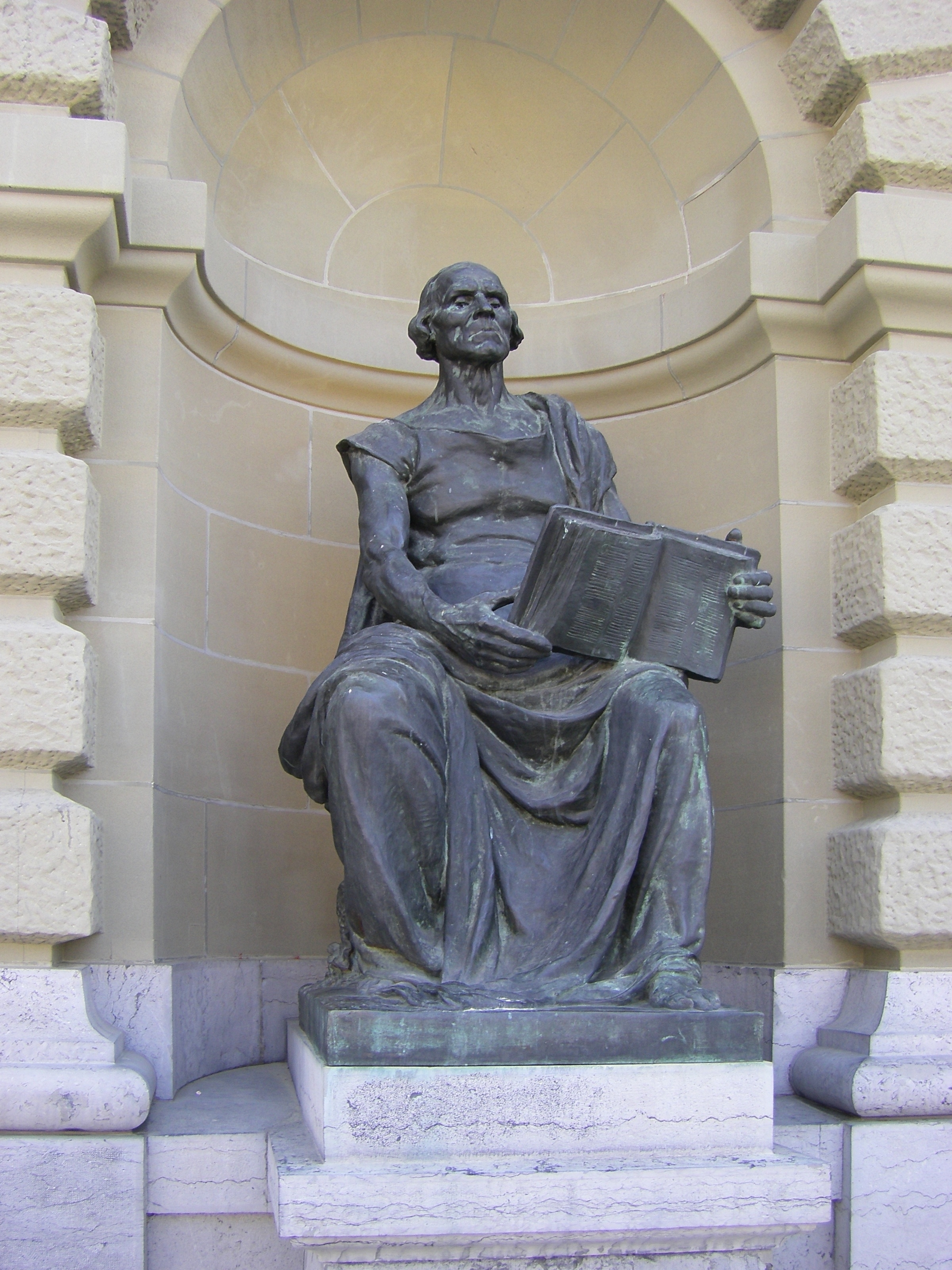
Statue Geschichtsschreiber der Vergangenheit (Chronicler of the past) at the Federal Palace in Bern, Switzerland.

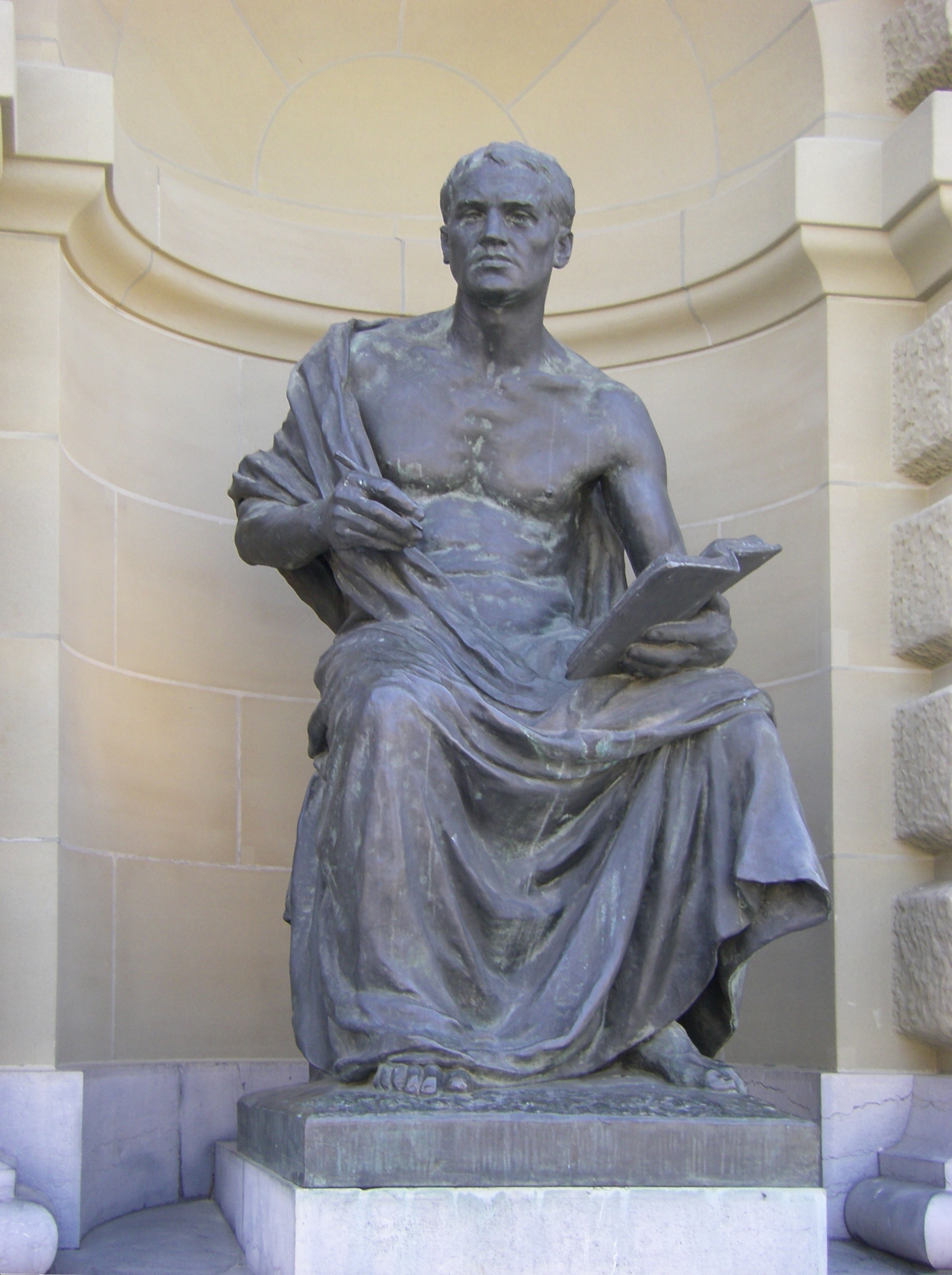
Statue Geschichtsschreiber der Gegenwart (Chronicler of the present) at the Federal Palace in Bern, Switzerland.
- The calm (plaster statue) and Bust of a child (bronze), both at the Musée Rath in Geneva, Switzerland.
- Statues of Polynesia and South America on the main post office of Geneva.
- Bronze bust of Henri-Frédéric Amiel, University of Geneva.
- Expression study, bronze bust at the Museum of Winterthur, Switzerland.
- Bronze statue of Major Davel in Lausanne, Switzerland (1891).
- The rage, bas-relief.
- A damned (after Dante), marble.
- Bronze busts of Mathias Morhardt and of Félix Vallotton.
- Bronze statues Chronicler of the past and Chronicler of the present besides the main entrance of the Federal Palace in Bern, Switzerland (1901).
- The heads of "Wisdom", "Strength", and "Courage", also at the Federal Palace in Bern; decorations in stone.
- Statue of Alexandre Vinet in Lausanne.

Paintings:

- Nue assise dans les fleurs, nude painting, 1922.
