= Leaf Greener =

Chinese fashion journalist

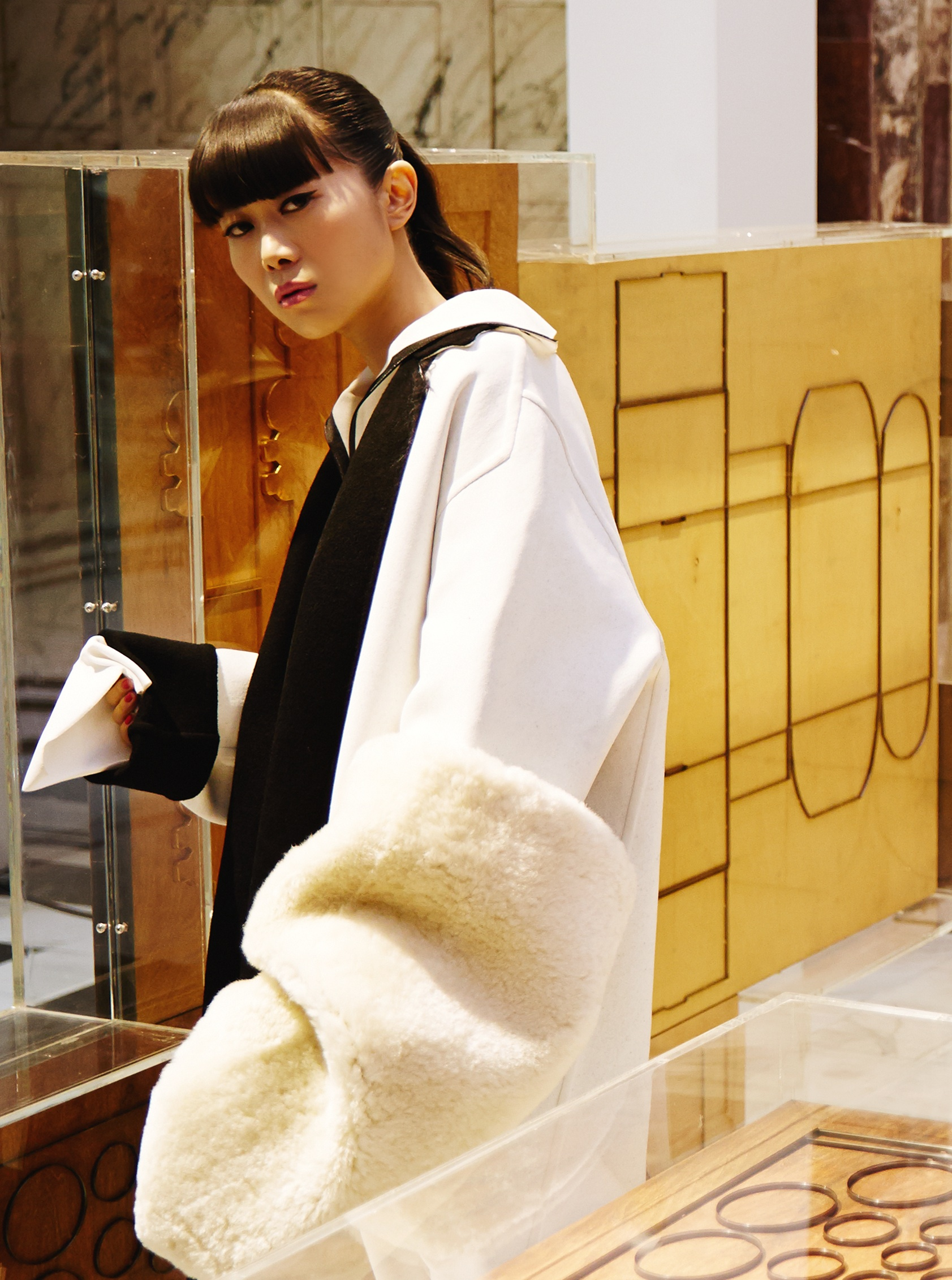
Leaf Greener

Leaf Greener is a fashion stylist, fashion reporter, creative consultant and founder of LEAF WeChat magazine. Leaf was born in Beijing and currently lives in Shanghai.

== Career ==
Leaf was hired to work as Senior Fashion Editor for Condé Nast China's Self Magazine. In 2008, she was appointed to take on the role of Senior Fashion Editor for China‘s highly regarded and most widely read fashion publication Elle magazine. She then moved on to work as a guest editor for Vogue China magazine. In 2015, she founded LEAF WeChat magazine, which is a self-published mobile magazine. She calls it "the small and artistic" — and it is published exclusively on mobile phones, through the popular app WeChat. She often helps bring Chinese designers to a broader audience, whether on Facebook and Instagram or on Chinese social media platforms Weibo and WeChat. In 2020, she collaborated with Puerto Rican artist, Edwin Antonio on his book titled “Runway Dreams”.

== Digital fashion star ==
Leaf is one of China's leading arbiters of style and one of the early digital fashion stars. She is often featured in popular fashion blogs like Garance Doré and Tommy Ton and has also been featured in international publications such as New York magazine, Vogue Japan, ELLE US, Vogue Australia, New York Times and the Daily Telegraph. She collaborates with brands such as Lane Crawford, H&M, MO&Co. Paris, Yoox to produce fashion videos and advertising campaigns. Leaf received The LYCRA awards "Mover of Style" award in 2014.

== Education ==
Leaf studied art in Beijing at the Central Academy of Fine Arts and received her BA in fashion design from Raffles Design Institute.
