= Joanna Horodyńska =

Polish television presenter and fashion personality (born 1970)

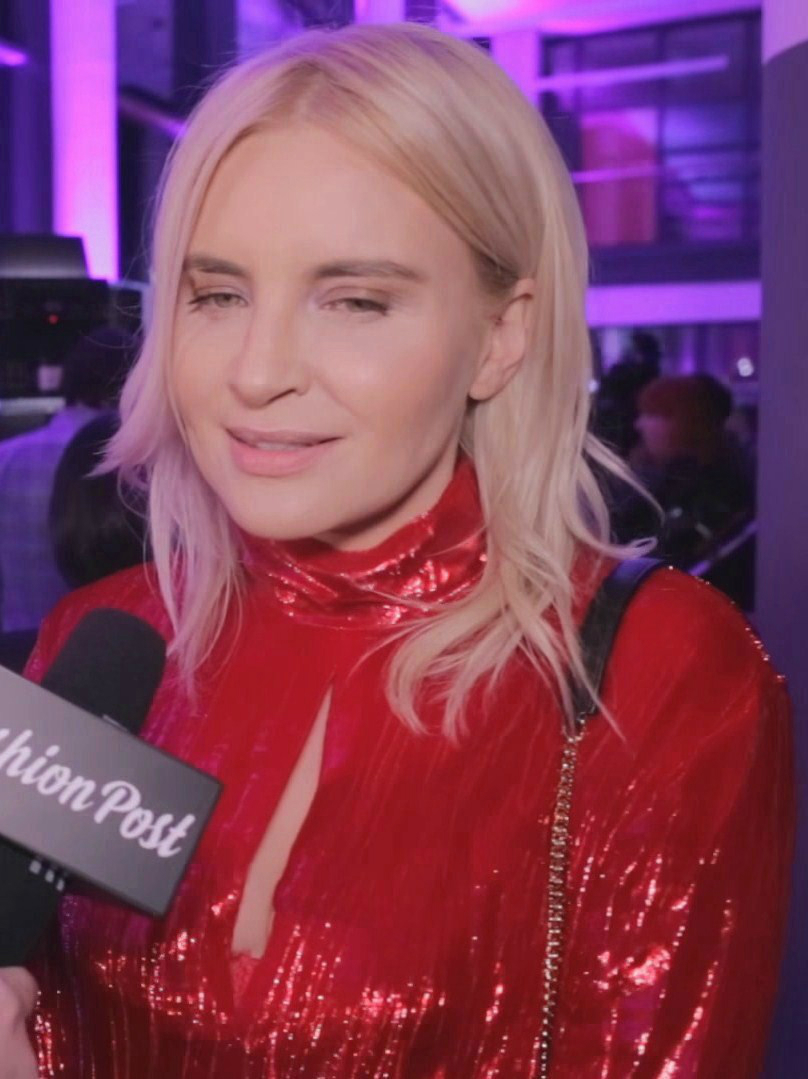
- Born: Joanna Horodyńska; November 30, 1975 (age 49); Tychy, Poland
- Modeling information
- Height: 176 cm (5 ft 9 in)
- Hair color: Brown (now Blond)
- Eye color: Hazel

Joanna Horodyńska (born 30 November 1975, Tychy) is a Polish model and television stylist. she started her career as a model, and is now active on television as a stylist and presenter. She is also the designer of a clothing collection.

== Career ==
When Horodyńska was eighteen she left the city of Tychy for Warsaw, where she worked as a model, posing three times for the Polish version of Playboy magazine. In January 2000 she posed for CKM, and in the same year she ended her career on the runway. Horodyńska then began to appear as a television presenter. She hosted (while lying in a foam-filled bath tub) a program called Pieprz ("Pepper") on Atomic TV and co-hosted a talk show called Miasto Kobiet ("City of Women") on TVN Style. In 2008 she appeared in a mobile phone advertisement for Sony Ericsson and hosted New Look on VH1 Polska.

Since March 2009, Horodyńska has hosted other TV programs, such as Gwiazdy na dywaniku ("Celebrities on the Rug"), on Polsat Café. In addition to appearing on TV, Horodyńska edits a column in Party magazine. In 2010 she was chosen as a stylist on the program You Can Dance: Po prostu tańcz! on TVN. In October 2010 she hosted Warsaw Fashion Weekend, an event featuring Polish fashion bloggers Glamourina and fashion designers such as Michael Michalsky.

In 2010 Horodyńska designed a clothing collection called Joannahorodyńskagatta for the "GATTA" brand.

== Advertisements ==
- 2011: advertising tights branded Gatta
- 2011: advertising liquid detergent branded Dreft
- 2009: advertising Rexona Women deodorant

== Private life ==
Her eight-year relationship with Marek Sowa, former chairman of Atomic TV (now MTV Polska), ended in 2009.

In 2015, she revealed she could not get pregnant due to a medical condition and was looking into adoption.
