= Tommy Ton =

Canadian photographer

- Born: Thomas Ton; 9 March 1984 (age 42); Oakville, Ontario, Canada
- Occupation: Photographer
- Years active: 2005–present
- Notable work: Jak & Jil, Style.com, Tommyton.com
- Website: tommyton.com

Tommy Ton (born 9 March 1984) is a Canadian photographer known for his fashion blog Jak & Jil, and his street style coverage of fashion weeks on Style.com and GQ.com. His favorite subjects are fashion editors, the likes of Carine Roitfeld, and Anna Dello Russo.

== Early life and education ==
Tommy Ton was born in Oakville, Ontario to Vietnamese Canadian parents. When Ton was 13 years old, he was asked by his sister to record FashionTelevision. Tom Ford appeared in the segment that Ton was recording, where Ford began expressing his views on women and sexuality. Impressed by Ford's ability to speak eloquently with carefully chosen words about his collection, Ton's interest in fashion began.

Although Ton did not receive formal training in photography, he educated himself by attending digital photography classes and met with friends who did graphic design to pursue a career in fashion and photography.

== Professional career ==
=== Early career ===
Following his new-found passion, he began pursuing various positions in the fashion industry. Despite his young age, at age 15, he interned with a local fashion designer, Wayne Clark, which led to his first job at the women's accessory department of an upscale Canadian department store Holt Renfrew. During his stint working at the women's accessory department, he was spotted by Barbara Atkin, a Vice President of Fashion Direction, of Holt Refrew, which subsequently landed him a job in the department store's buying office furthering his career in fashion industry.

=== Jak and Jil ===
In 2005, encouraged by the rise of online magazines, Ton conceived Jak & Jil. The site was originally intended to be a lifestyle website featuring products and people in Toronto. Although different from the current iteration of Jak & Jil, it attracted the attention of local business owner Lynda Latner. Latner runs a website and a showroom that sells high-end vintage garments. Ton was hired to help Latner to expand her business. In 2007, Latner offered to send Ton to London and Paris to attend fashion week, which became the first opportunity to expand his practice internationally. Ton was tired of taking head-to-toe photographs, which became the convention of documenting street style popularized by Scott Schuman of The Sartorialist, and Asian street-style websites and blogs. To aesthetically and conceptually differentiate his photographs from those of other style bloggers, Ton started taking candid photographs. He favored landscape oriented rather than portrait oriented photographs and focused on the details of the outfit (such as contrasting patterns of the lining of the coat, or intricate details of the heels) rather than the whole ensemble. To accommodate and give more weight to his fashion week photographs, he renovated his website to its current blog format. Ton's new approach to street style photography, coupled with a redesigned website, received attention from other bloggers like Susanna Lau of Style Bubble, and helped him to attract wider audience for his photography.

=== Breakthrough ===
Hong Kong-based high-end retail chain Lane Crawford, who asked Ton to shoot their Spring/Summer 2009 campaign. In Fall/Winter 2009 Ton was invited to sit on the front-row of a Dolce and Gabbana fashion show, along with fellow fashion bloggers Bryanboy, Garance Doré and Scott Schuman. This moment signaled a paradigm shift in fashion journalism. Following the Dolce and Gabbana show, Ton was hired by other fashion houses to shoot their fashion shows. In addition, publications such as The New York Times and The Boston Globe began requesting and running his photographs, thereby increasing his public profile in fashion media.

=== Style.com ===
Style.com editor-in-chief Dirk Standen asked Ton to cover fashion week for Style.com and GQ. Scott Schuman of The Sartorialist, who had previously held the position, was preparing to leave to focus on his personal projects. Since then, Ton remained the main contributor of fashion week street style coverage for both Style.com, and GQ, effectively making him the de facto photographer of record for fashion week street style.

=== TommyTon.com ===
On 2 September 2015, Ton launched his website, Tommyton.com and announced that he would not be joining Vogue Runway, which launched 1 September 2015. Instead, Ton will cover shows independently. Ton's site includes images from the past, including those previously featured on Style.com, GQ.com and the photographer's former blog, Jak & Jil, as well as previously unpublished photographs.
