= Bob Greener =

English footballer

Personal information
- Full name: Robert Greener
- Date of birth: 17 July 1899
- Place of birth: Birtley, County Durham, England
- Date of death: February 1970 (aged 70)
- Place of death: Croydon, London, England
- Height: 5 ft 10 in (1.78 m)
- Positions: Half-back; inside forward

Senior career*
Years	Team	Apps	(Gls)
–1921	Birtley Colliery		
1921–1932	Crystal Palace	293	(5)
1932–1933	York City	24	(0)
Total		317	(5)
- * Club domestic league appearances and goals

Robert Greener (17 July 1899 – February 1970) was an English professional footballer who played as a half-back or an inside forward in the Football League for Crystal Palace and York City and in non-League football for Birtley Colliery. After retiring, he worked at Crystal Palace as assistant trainer and later trainer.
