= La Mode Pratique =

French fashion magazine

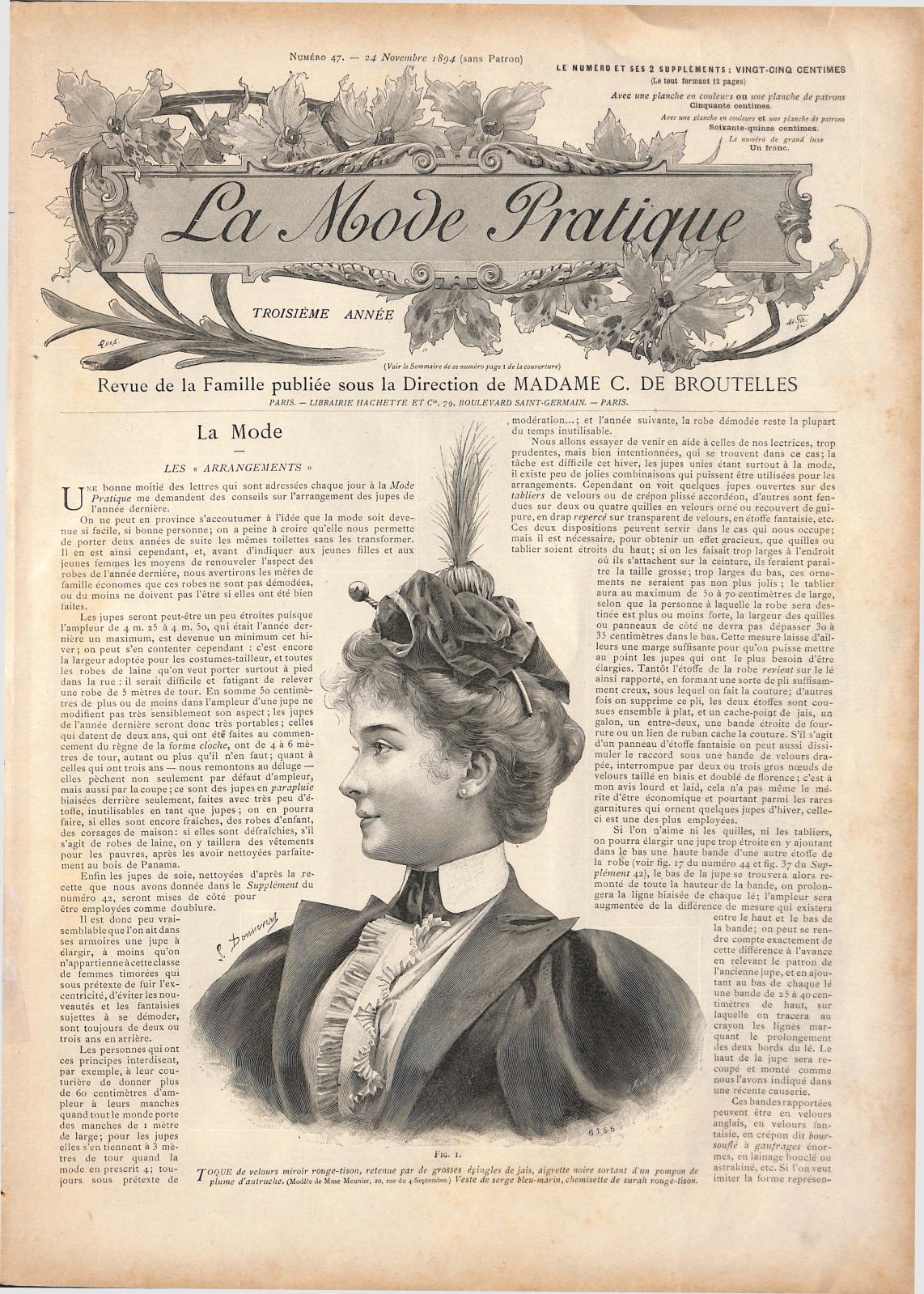
- La Mode Pratique, Vol 3, Number 47, 24 November 1894
- Categories: Fashion
- Frequency: weekly
- Publisher: Librairie Hachette et Cie
- Founder: Caroline de Broutelles
- Founded: 1891
- First issue: 1892
- Final issue: 1951
- Country: France
- Based in: Paris
- Language: French

La Mode Pratique was a weekly French fashion magazine founded by Caroline de Broutelles in 1891, and published until 1951 by Paris publisher Librairie Hachette et Cie. In 1892, it became the first magazine worldwide to feature fashion photography.

It was subsequently translated and published in English in London by under the name Fashions of To-day by Sampson Low, Marston & Company
