= Glamourina =

Polish fashion blogger

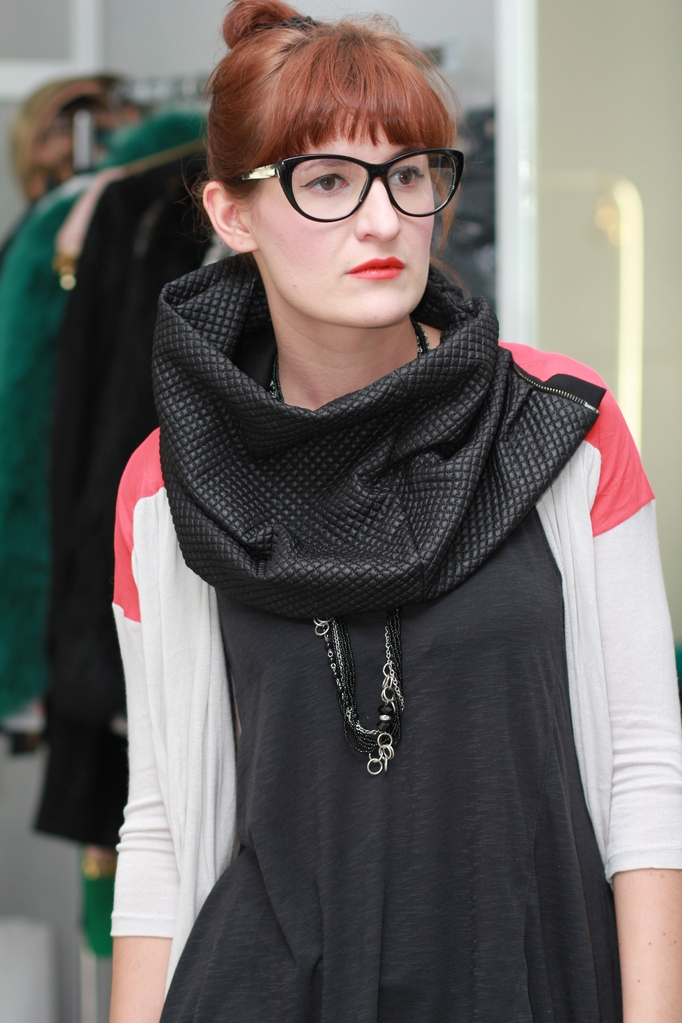
- Born: Natalia Grytsuk; 15 May 1988 (age 38); Ukraine
- Other name: Nataliia
- Occupations: Fashion blogger and stylist

Glamourina, shortened to Glam (born Natalia Grytsuk; 15 May 1988), is a Ukraine-born Polish fashion blogger who creates fashion outfits. She holds a master's degree in international relations (specializing in strategic studies) from Warsaw University, Poland. Her blog depicts fashion creations she wears herself instead of using a hired model. Some of her outfits are created on assignment or for sponsored events. Outside of fashion, Glamourina is the primary author of a course on the Ukrainian language for Polish speakers. Her areas of interest are eco-friendly fashion, natural lifestyle, yoga, singing, psychology, and personal development.

== Blog history ==
Glamourina started blogging in early 2011. Her blog soon became popular and attracted the attention of sponsors. She initially worked mainly with Polish online clothing stores which wanted to publicize their brands to her readers. After a few months she started to be invited at many events by Polish and international brands.

== Fashion ==
In July 2011, the Australian jewelry company, Diva, invited a few Polish bloggers to a professional street fashion photo session, where Glamourina and other fashion bloggers had to create a look using Diva jewelry.

In September 2011, Gatta invited some fashion bloggers to an event where they had to create a look with clothes wearing the Gatta label collection Joannahorodyńskagatta designed by Joanna Horodyńska.

In October 2011, Glamourina took part in the Warsaw Fashion Weekend, an event sponsored by BlackBerry, Play, and presented by renowned stylist, Jola Czaja. This time, instead of having the bloggers wear the clothes themselves, they were presented by models in a catwalk.

Aside from taking part in such events, Glamourina works with other brands — Atlantic among the others, creating looks with their clothes or accessories and showing them on her blog.

== See also ==
- Karla Deras
