= Pierre-Louis Pierson =

French photographer (1822–1913)

Pierre-Louis Pierson (Hinckange, 13 December 1822 – Paris, 22 March 1913) was a French portrait photographer.

His studio was located at 5 Boulevard des Capucines in central Paris.

== Early life ==
Pierson became interested in photography while the medium was in its infancy in the early 1840s. He had a photography studio in Paris as early as 1844, and enjoyed a solid reputation. For many years, he located his studio at 5, boulevard des Capucines, where he was associated with the Mayer brothers (Léopold-Ernest Mayer and Louis-Frédéric Mayer). At that address, their company grew into a formidable enterprise.

== Photographer of His Majesty the Emperor Napoléon III ==
Initially using the daguerreotype, the Pierson-Mayer studio became one of the first to specialise in portrait photography retouched with watercolour or oils. The French Emperor Napoléon III came to prefer their studio, particularly once he established the Second French Empire in 1852.

Pierson created numerous portraits of the French Imperial family during the apex of the Second Empire.

Between 1855 and 1862, at the peak of the Pierson-Mayer studio's prominence, people of all types came to have their pictures taken there, including the imperial court, the aristocracy, powerful businessmen, actresses and musicians. Pierson and the Mayer brothers photographed the kings of Württemberg, Portugal, and Sweden. Starting in 1862, their clientele became more varied, and by 1866, included people of all socioeconomic backgrounds.

== Photographer of the Countess of Castiglione ==
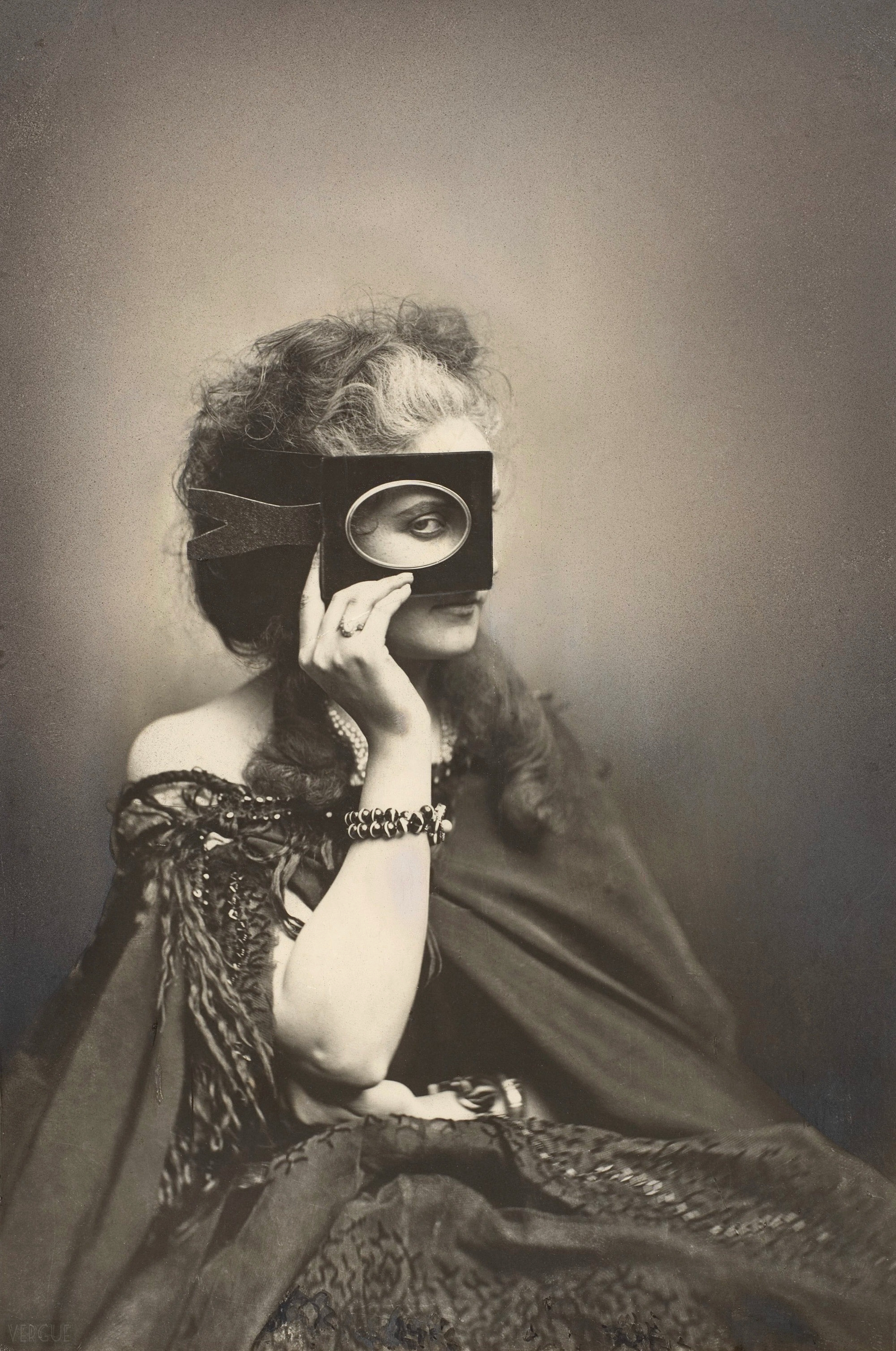
Photograph of the Countess of Castiglione by Pierre-Louis Pierson in the 1860s.

Pierson first met the Countess of Castiglione in 1856, and he would remain her official photographer for forty years. In 1867, Pierson exhibited his portrait of the countess posed as the Queen of Hearts in the French section of photography at that year's Exposition Universelle in Paris.

Pierson and the countess began an intense photographer–model collaboration between 1861 and 1867, wherein she became a master of the art of mise-en-scène and developed roles of a madonna, battered woman, mother, and the high-styled woman dressed in extravagant outfits. In a playful atmosphere which was left largely to improvisation, the countess, with Pierson's help, created many different personalities. Dresses, hairstyles, and attitudes were all studied to dramatic effect. Thanks to the effects of mirrors, she could present different conceptions of the self at the same time. Certain studies show her hair extended; others, cropped. Always at her disposal, Pierson photographed her exposed legs and feet, which were considered erotic imagery, very daring for the time.

Nonetheless, during the countess's lifetime these photos were hers and Pierson's secret. Between 1856 and 1895, the countess posed for more than 450 portraits. This frenetic series of photos, quite rare for the time, was one of the first examples of the photographic self-portrait.

== The Braun Company, 1878–1913 ==
In 1878, Pierson went into partnership with his son-in-law Gaston Braun, the heir to the Braun Company and the brother-in-law of Léon Clément. They managed to resurrect the Société Adolphe Braun et Compagnie from the brink of collapse. From then on, Pierson's photographic collection belonged to Braun.

In 1883, the Braun Company signed an exclusive thirty-year contract with the Louvre with the goal of reproducing photographically some 7,000 works of art. The photographs deposited into the inventory of the museum became the property of the French state, and in exchange, the Braun company became the official photographers for the Louvre.

In 1889, the company became Braun, Clément & Compagnie. Their working studio was rebuilt and completely electrified between 1897 and 1899. In 1910, the company was renamed Braun et Compagnie. By this time, the company had opened already a branch studio in New York City and would open one in London the following year.

== Gallery ==
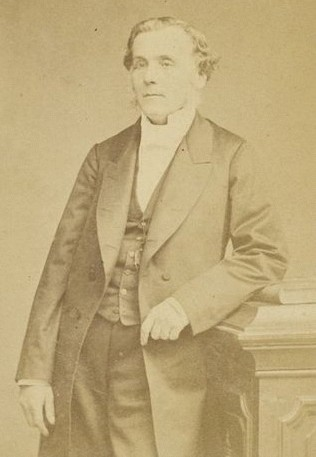
Victor Lefranc

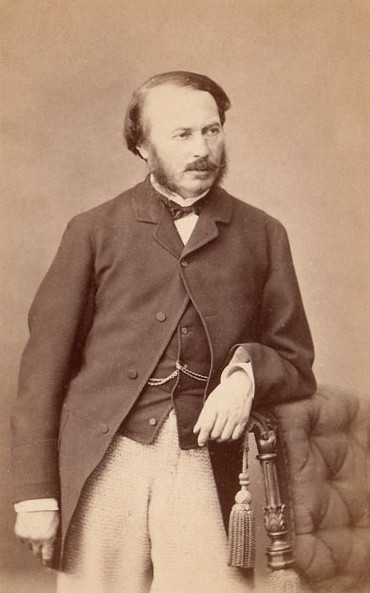
Victor de Persigny

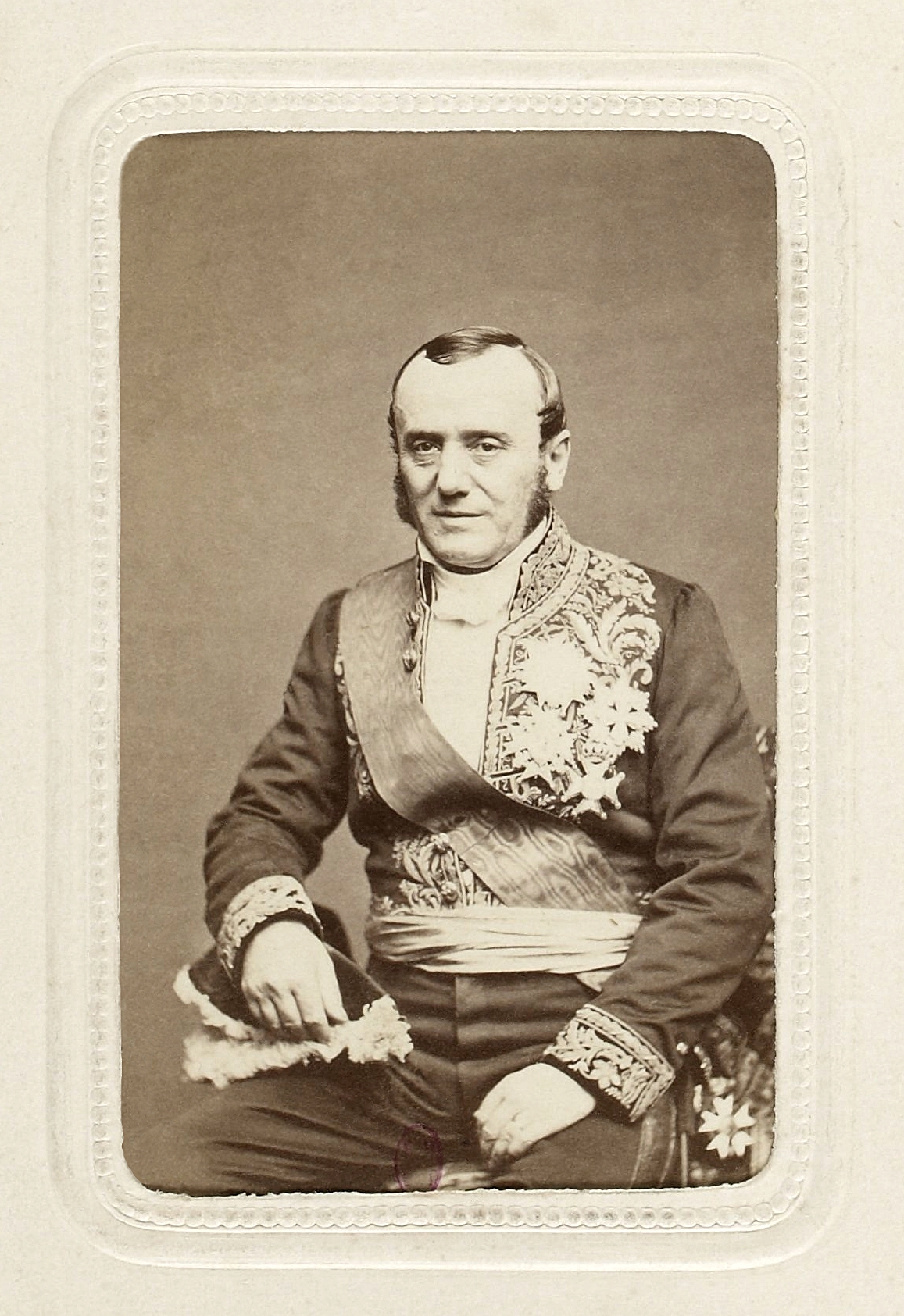
Adolphe Billault

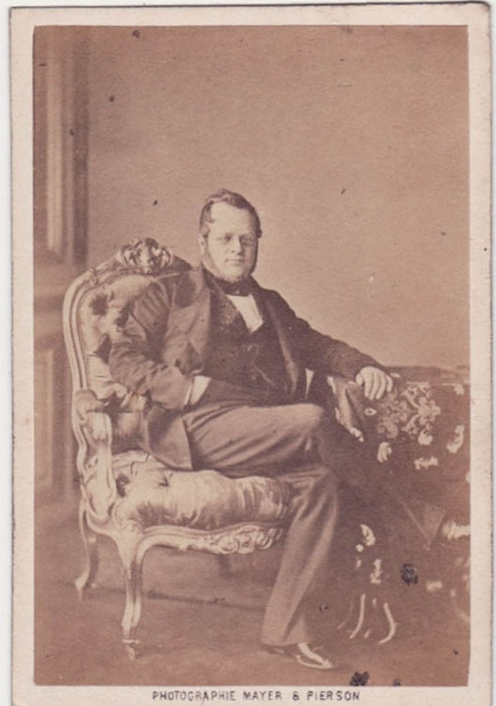
Camillo Cavour

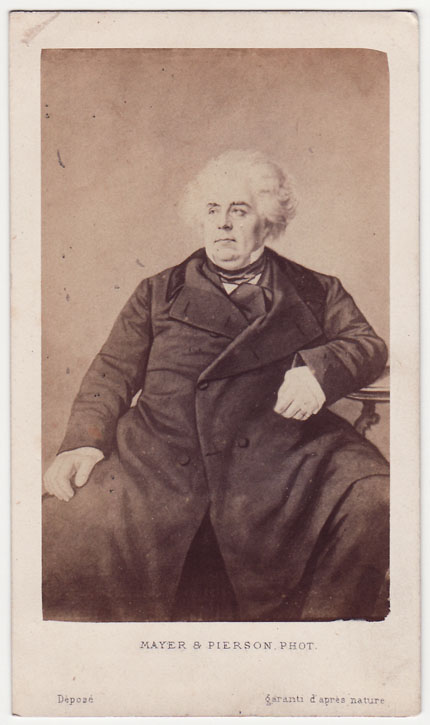
Luigi Lablache

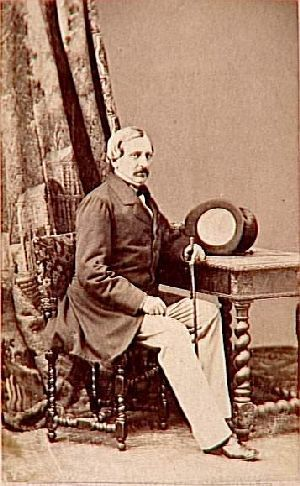
Eugène Chevandier de Valdrôme

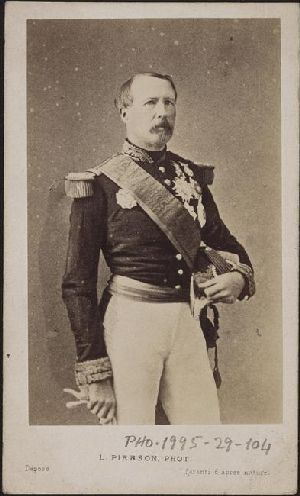
Patrice de Mac Mahon

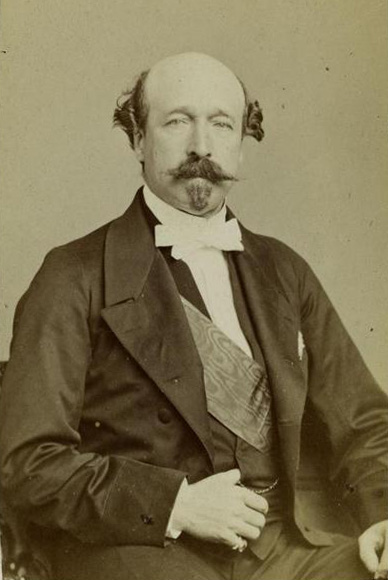
Duc de Morny

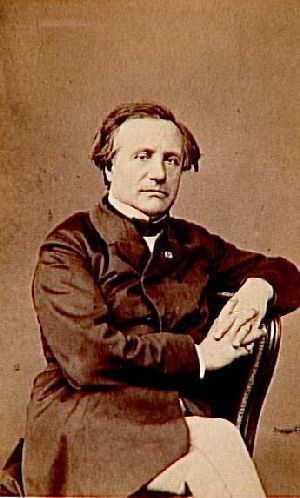
Victor Duruy

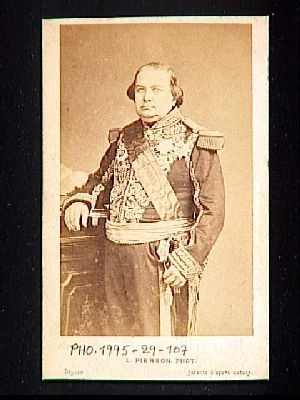
Charles Rigault de Genouilly

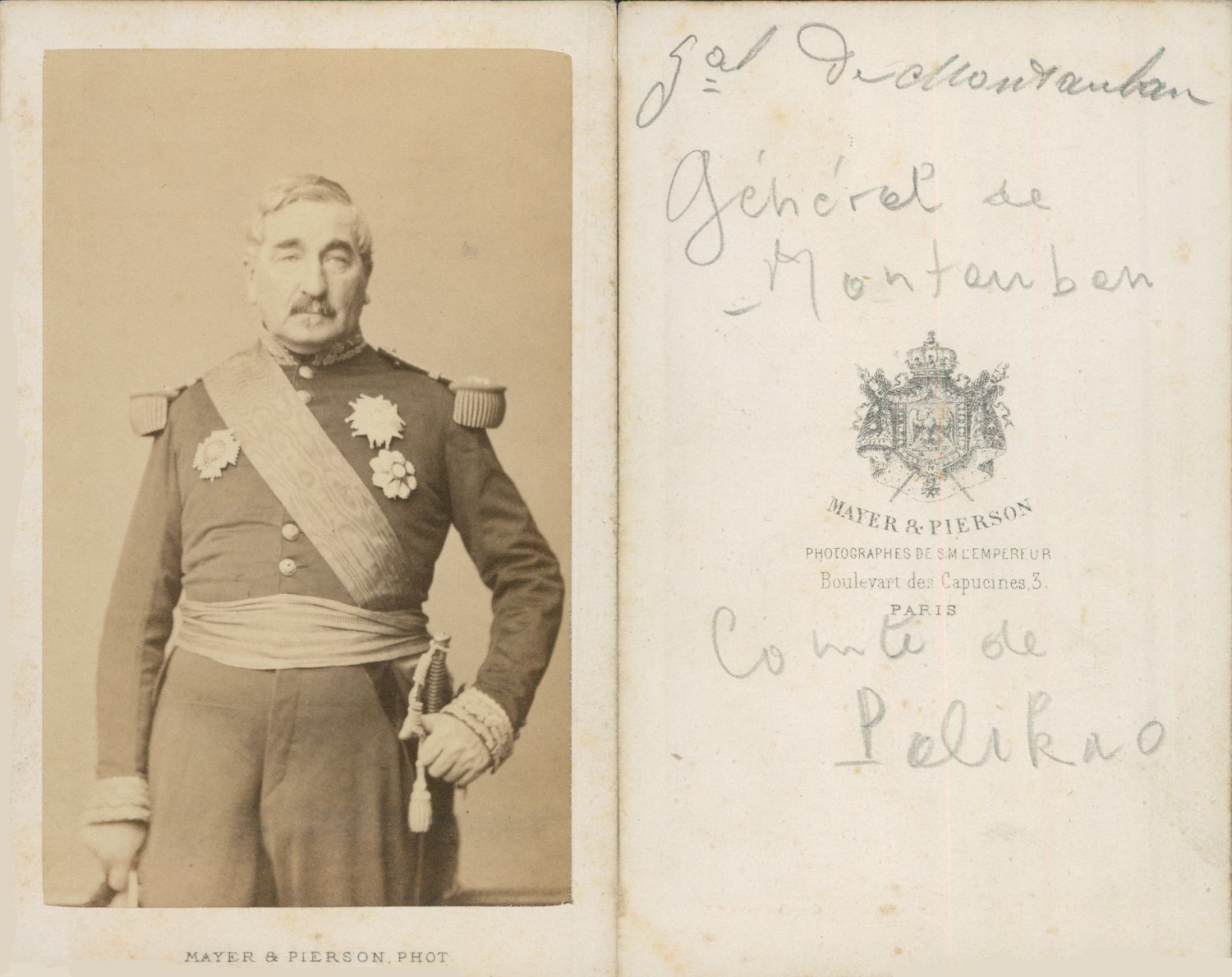
Charles Cousin-Montauban

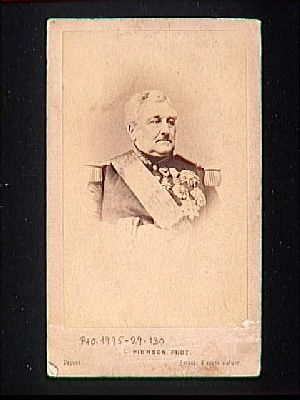
Jean-Baptiste Philibert Vaillant

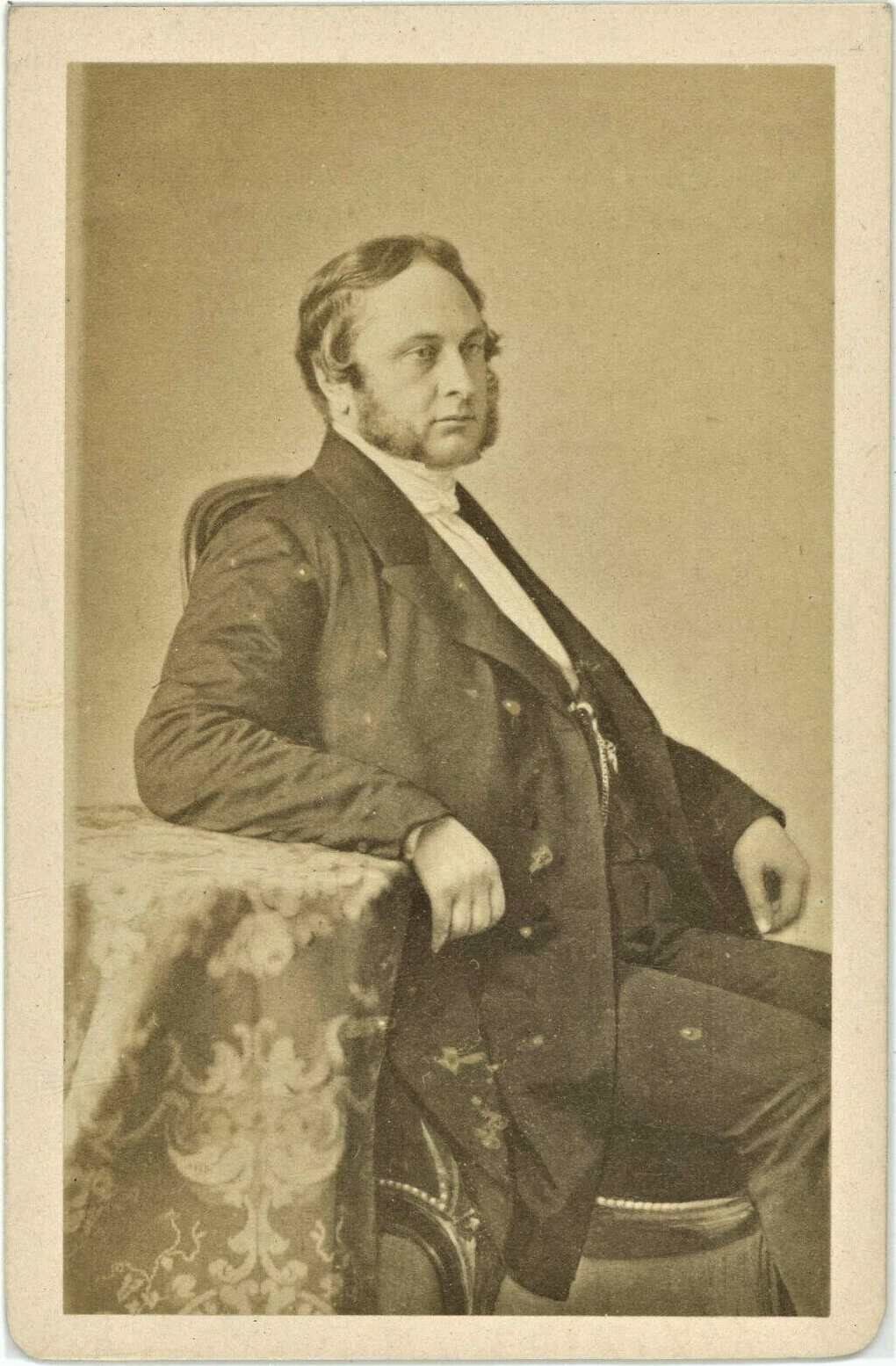
Eugene Rouher

== Expositions ==
- 2000: Metropolitan Museum of Art, New York
- 2000: Palazzo Cavour, Turin

== Films ==
- La Séance, 2015, short film by Edouard de La Poëze, starring Fanny Ardant and Paul Hamy

== See also ==
- Adolphe Braun
- List of French photographers
