= Scott Schuman =

American blogger and fashion photographer

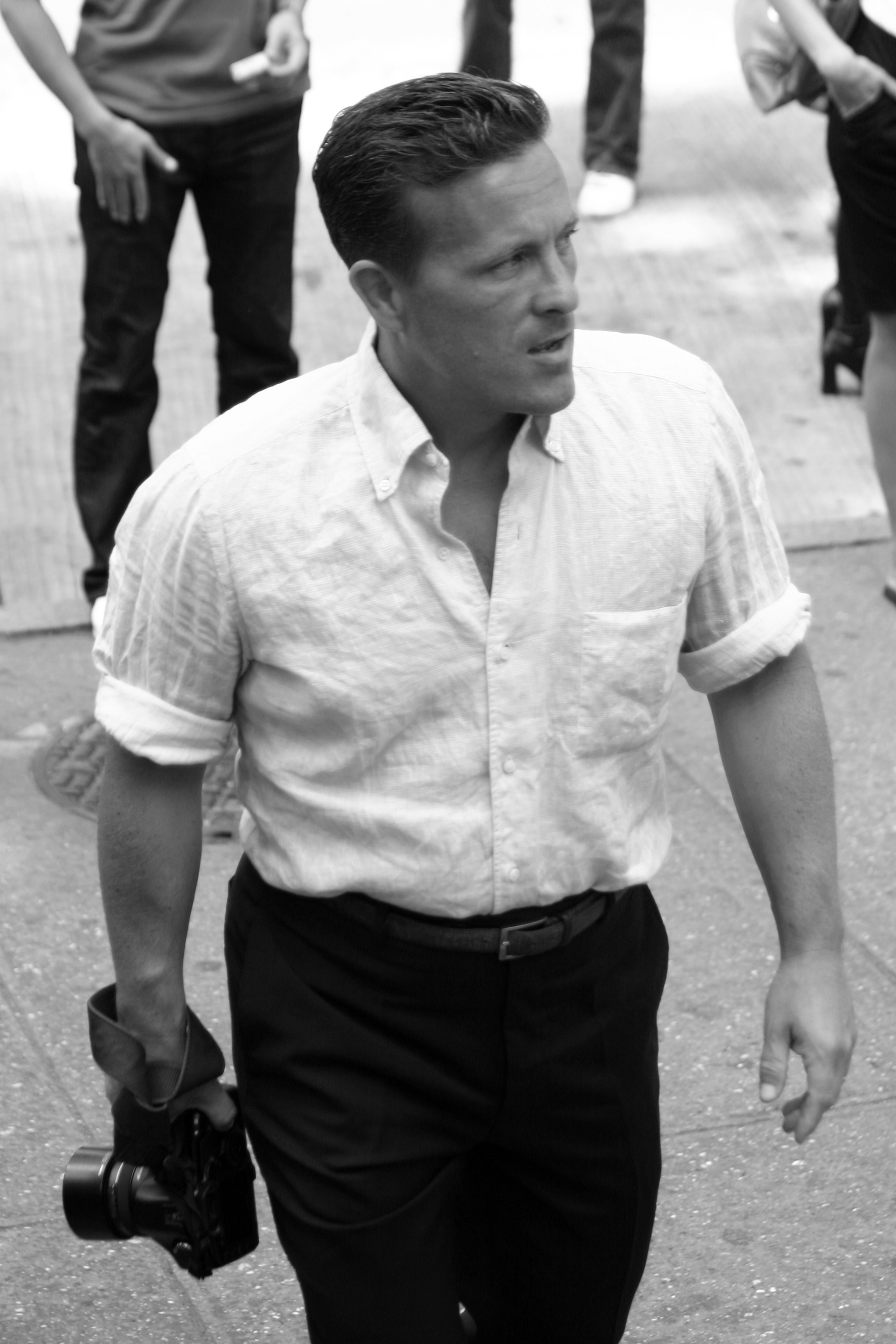
- Schuman in 2007.
- Born: November 2, 1968 (age 58)
- Education: Indiana University
- Occupations: Blogger and journalist
- Website: www.thesartorialist.com

Scott Schuman (born November 2, 1968) is an American blogger and fashion photographer who created The Sartorialist fashion blog.

== Early life ==
A native of Indiana, Schuman once worked as a sales associate at the 1980s chain Chess King. Later he attended Indiana University, graduating with a degree in apparel merchandising and a minor in costume construction.

== The Sartorialist ==
After leaving his position as director of men's fashion at his showroom to take care of his daughter in September 2005, he began carrying a digital camera around and photographing people he saw on the street whose style he found striking. He posted these to his blog, sometimes with short comments, always either favorable or open-minded. He is known for photographing what have been described as 'real people.'

Schuman began his site with the hopes of connecting fashion and everyday street life. He was hired to do similar coverage for Condé Nast's style.com (since been replaced by Tommy Ton of the blog Jak and Jil). He has covered shows during New York Fashion Week for Saks Fifth Avenue. In 2007, he was named one of AskMen's Top 49 Men of the year. In 2008, Schuman appeared as a model in Gap's fall campaign. Schuman contributed portraits to Burberry's "Art of the Trench" marketing campaign.

Schuman has been featured in GQ magazine where he was given his own page in every issue for nearly four years, as well as his work appearing in Vogue Italia, Vogue Paris and Interview magazine. Schuman has also been commissioned to work on advertisements for Gant by Michael Bastian, DKNY Jeans and Nespresso. An anthology of his images were published in 2009 by Penguin and has been translated into Korean.

== Personal life ==
Schuman dated the French street-fashion photographer and illustrator Garance Doré from 2008 to 2014. Shortly after they met in 2007, Schuman left his wife of 20 years. He and Doré began dating within months, and she eventually left her home in France and moved to New York to be with him. He has two daughters. In April 2016 he was confirmed to be dating Jenny Walton, the fashion director at The Sartorialist. In March 2017, he became engaged to Walton. Scott and Jenny announced their breakup on May 13, 2022.

== See also ==
- Bill Cunningham (American photographer)
