= Garance Doré =

French photographer and illustrator

- Born: Mariline Fiori; May 1, 1975 (age 50); Corsica, France
- Occupations: Blogger, Illustrator, Photographer, Author
- Spouse: Graham McTavish (m. 2023)
- Partner(s): Scott Schuman (2008–2014); Chris Norton (2016–2018)
- Website: garancedore.fr

Garance Doré (born Mariline Fiori; May 1, 1975) is a French photographer, illustrator and author, best known for her fashion blog.

== Early life ==
Doré was born Mariline Fiori in Corsica, France.

== Career ==
She worked as a freelance illustrator in France before beginning her blog in 2006. Her original illustrations have been featured by Louis Vuitton, Dior, Kate Spade, and Gap. Shortly after beginning her blog, Doré began incorporating writing into her posts.

In 2007, Doré began to feature photography of people around Paris on her blog, a format now known as "streetstyle". Since this time, she has worked with Chloé, Chopard, David Yurman, Tiffany & Co., and J. Crew on photography collaborations. She was named in a New York Times article as the "guardian of all style".

In 2009, Doré began creating video content for her blog. Within a few months she was collaborating on video content with major brands, such as Dior, Chopard, Tiffany & Co., Petit Bateau, J. Crew, Max Mara and Kering, and, in 2012, had developed her own YouTube series "Pardon My French". Previous "Pardon My French" episodes have focused on Fashion Week and interviews with Stella McCartney, Jenna Lyons, Dries van Noten and Anna Dello Russo. In 2012, Doré and then-boyfriend Scott Schuman, of The Sartorialist, won the Council of Fashion Designers of America Media Award.

Garance's first book Love Style Life was published by Spiegel & Grau in October 2015. Poised as a visual memoir, the book layered personal stories about subjects from style to love along with original photos and illustrations.

Doré's work has been featured in Harper’s Bazaar, GQ, Vogue, Self Service and French Elle (magazine). Her work as a photographer, illustrator and author has appeared in a variety of publications, including The New York Times, T: The New York Times Style Magazine, New York Magazine, Vogue, British Vogue, The Guardian, and Elle (magazine).

In 2015 Doré retired from the fashion industry though she continues to maintain her blog as a lifestyle blog called Atelier Doré.

== Awards ==
- French Elle (magazine) 30 Most Powerful Women in Fashion
- 2009 Men. Style Top 25 Women in Fashion
- 2010 Forbes Magazine 20 Best Fashion Blogs for Professional Women
- 2011 Turkish Elle (magazine) Style Award for Fashion Blogger of the Year
- 2012 Council of Fashion Designers of America Eugenia Sheppard Media Award
- 2012: Doré and Schuman won the CFDA's Eugenia Sheppard Media Award, and were the first bloggers to receive this award.

== Personal life ==
From 2008 to 2014 Doré was in a relationship with photographer Scott Schuman In 2016, Doré became engaged to jazz musician Chris Norton. They separated in 2018.

In 2020 she relocated to Wellington, New Zealand and launched L'Ile, a subscription-based newsletter and online community. In 2023, she married actor Graham McTavish at Borthwick Castle in Scotland.
