= Caroline de Broutelles =

French journalist and magazine founder (1865–1940)

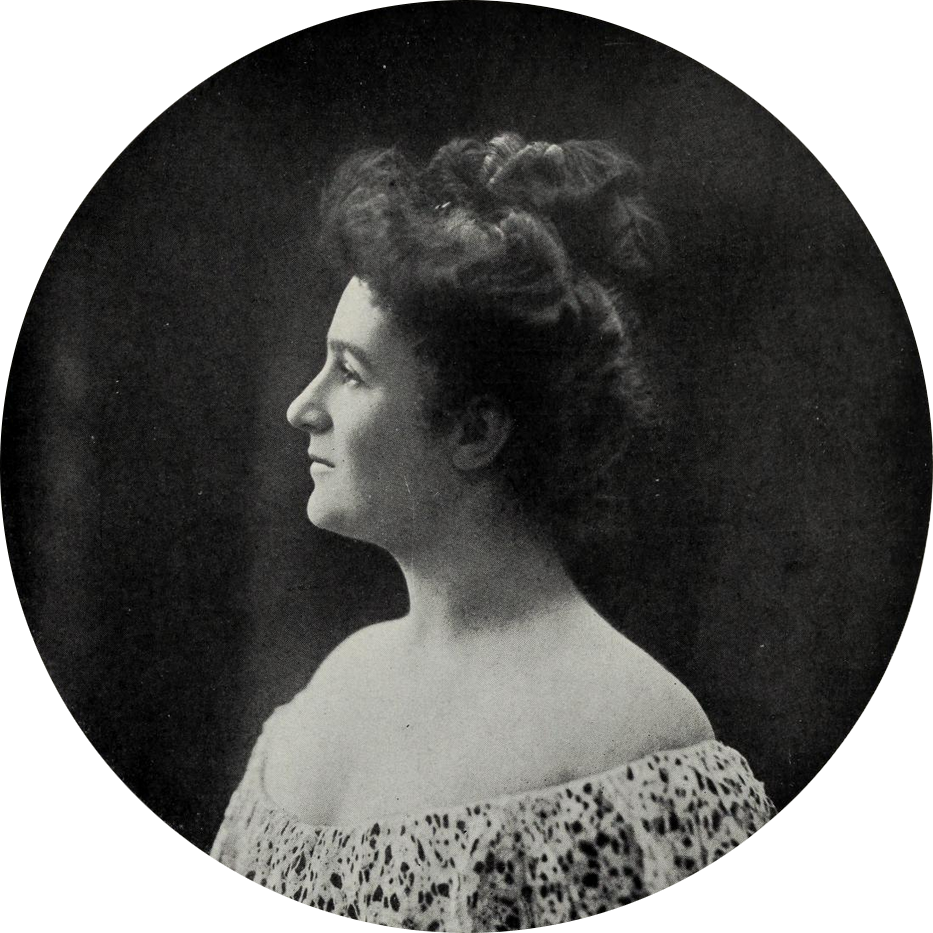
- De Broutelles in 1907
- Born: Caroline Mathilde Elisa de Broutelles; 19 April 1865; El Biar, Algiers, French Algeria
- Died: 14 June 1940 (aged 75); Hauts-de-Seine, France
- Occupation: Journalist
- Spouse: Maurice Reymond de Broutelles (m. 1889; died 1936)
- Children: 2
- Writing career
- Pen name: C. de Broutelles; Comtesse de Broutelles
- Notable awards: Legion of Honour, 1925

Signature
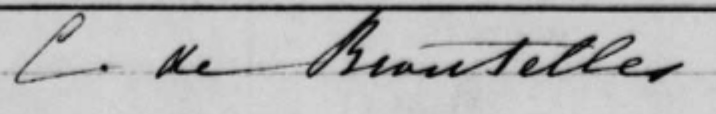

Caroline de Broutelles (married name Reymond; 19 April 1865 – 14 June 1940), also known as C. de Broutelles and Comtesse de Broutelles, was a French journalist and founder of the women's magazines La Mode Pratique, La Vie Hereuse, and Le Conseil des Femmes.

== Early life ==
De Broutelles was born Caroline Mathilde Elisa de Broutelles on 19 April 1865 in El Biar, French Algeria (present-day Algeria) to Ernest de Broutelles, a Lieutenant commander, and Marie Louise Saunier.

== Career ==
Caroline de Broutelles founded La Mode Pratique in 1891. La Mode Pratique was a women's magazine, publishing content such as fashion plates, patterns, and recipes.

In 1902, she founded La Vie Heureuse with La Mode Pratique's publisher Hachette, likely in an attempt to compete with the newly established Femina. While at the magazine, she jointly founded the women's literary prize Prix Vie Heureuse in 1904. The prize was founded by de Broutelles and 21 other female writers, including Julia Daudet, Jeanne Mette, Juliette Adam, and Séverine in response to their frustration with the Goncourt Prize, which they thought was unfairly biased against women with its all-male jury, undemocratic, and excluded poetry.

The prize later became Prix Femina following the magazine Femina's sale to Hachette and merger with La Vie Heureuse in 1917. The prize continues to be awarded annually and decided by an all-female jury.

In 1925, De Broutelles was awarded the Legion of Honour.

== Personal life ==
On 15 May 1889, De Broutelles married the Swiss artist Maurice Reymond, who took her last name, becoming Maurice Reymond de Broutelles. Together they had two sons.

On 14 June 1940, De Broutelles died in Hauts-de-Seine aged 75.
