= Atomic TV =

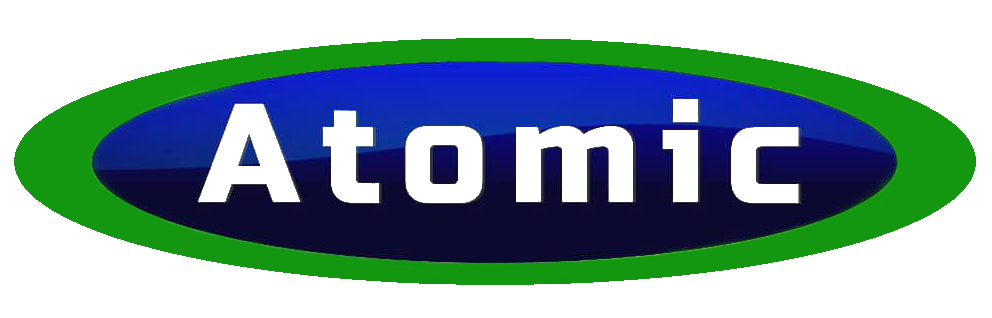
- Type: music television channel
- Country: Romania
- Broadcast area: Romania; Moldova
- Headquarters: Bucharest, Romania

Programming
- Language: Romanian
- Picture format: HDTV (1080i)

Ownership
- Owner: Dacia RTV Bucharest (1999–2004, Atomic Entertainment license); Atomic Media Advertising (2021–present)

History
- Launched: 3 February 1999 (first launch); 20 November 2021 (relaunch)
- Closed: 26 June 2004 (original)
- Replaced by: TV K Lumea (Romania) (2004)

Links
- Website: https://atomictv.ro

Atomic TV (stylized as Atomic. and simply known as Atomic) is a Romanian television network launched on 20 November 2021 as an online livestreaming channel, and on 23 November 2021 as a television channel. The channel primarily airs music made in Romania from the 90s and 2000s, but also music from 2010s.

The channel is a revival of the original Atomic TV channel launched on 3 February 1999, rebranded as TV K Lumea on 26 June 2004, sold to SBS Broadcasting Group and rebranded as Kiss TV in 2006.
