= The Sartorialist =

American fashion blog

- Screenshot of The Sartorialist.
- Website type: Fashion blog, photoblog
- Available in: English
- Dissolved: February 2026; 7 months ago
- Creator: Scott Schuman
- Website: thesartorialist.com
- Launched: September 2005; 21 years ago
- Current status: Defunct

The Sartorialist was a fashion blog by Scott Schuman in New York City. The Sartorialist name is also used for social media publications by Schuman, including the Substack publication The SartoriaLIST and Schuman's personal Instagram account.

The Sartorialist website experienced a period of inactivity in early 2026 but was active as of June 2026.

== Details ==
After leaving a fashion sales position to take care of his daughter in 2005, Scott Schuman began carrying a digital camera around on the streets of New York City, taking pictures of people who had dressed in a way that caught his eye, and then posting them to his blog, sometimes with comments about what he'd found. He was the first street photography fashion blogger to receive widespread attention.

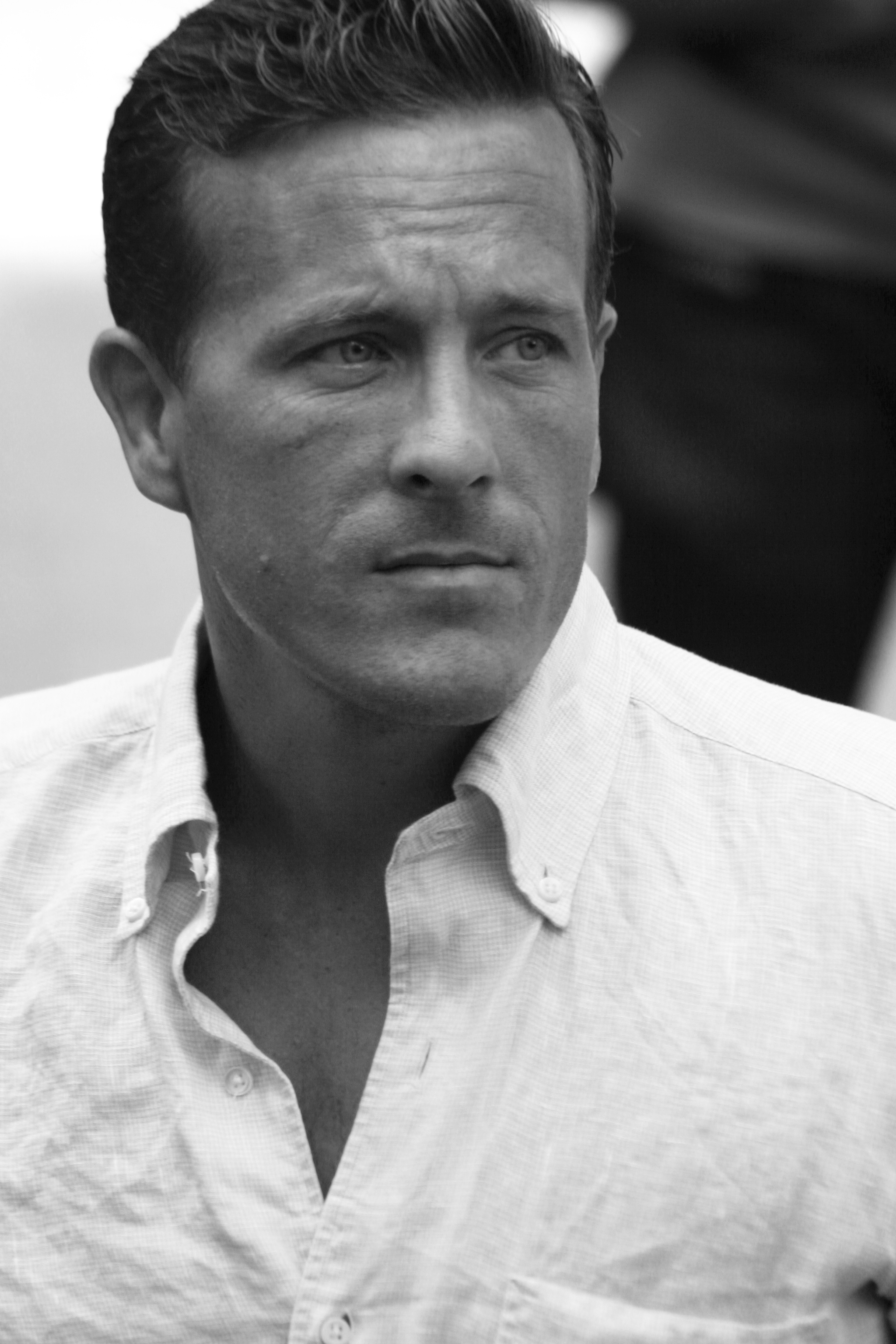
Scott Schuman

Schuman began The Sartorialist with the idea of creating a two-way dialogue about the world of fashion and its relationship to daily life.

He describes his philosophy as trying to echo how fashion designers looked at what they saw on the street:

I thought I could shoot people on the street the way designers looked at people, and get and give inspiration to lots of people in the process. My only strategy when I began The Sartorialist was to try and shoot style in a way that I knew most designers hunted for inspiration.

Schuman's creative and professional partnerships included a variety of large corporate entities: The Gap, Verizon, Kiehl's, Nespresso, DKNY Jeans, Gant, OVS, and Crate & Barrel. Burberry hired Schuman as a photographer for the “Art of the Trench” project.

Schuman also worked with fashion publications. For Condé Nast's style.com website, Schuman covered Paris Fashion Week. He regularly works events for Saks Fifth Avenue.

In 2009, an anthology of Schuman's favourite shots from around the world was published as a book entitled The Sartorialist.

== See also ==
- Glamourina
- Karla Deras
